= Outline of Cape Town =

Legislative capital of South Africa

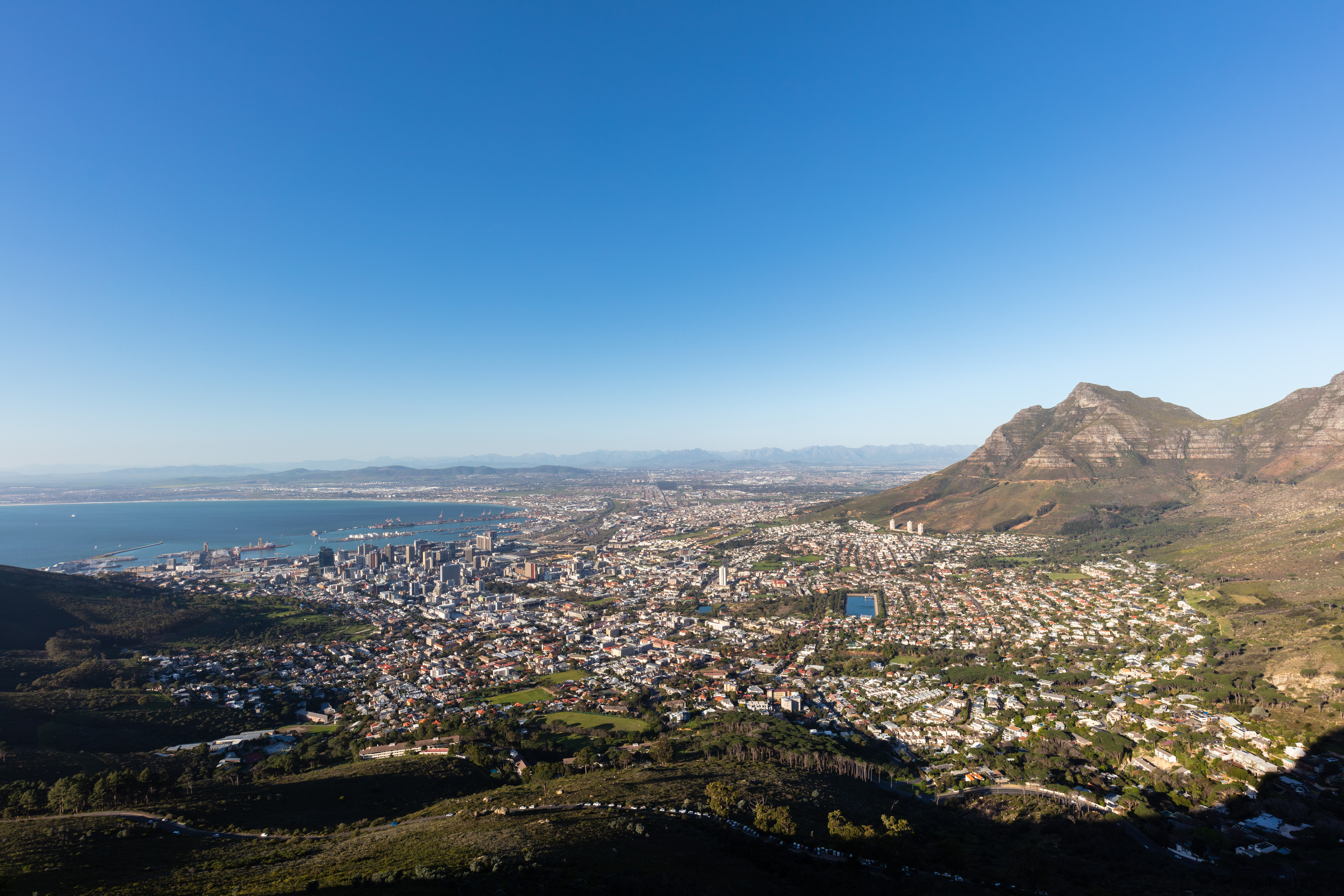
View north-eastwards across the city bowl of Cape Town from Lion's Head

The following outline is provided as an overview of and topical guide to Cape Town:

Cape Town – capital city of the Western Cape province and legislative capital of South Africa.

== General reference ==
- Pronunciation: Afrikaans: Kaapstad [ˈkɑːpstat]; Xhosa: iKapa [ikáːpa]; Khoekhoe: ǁHui!gaeb
- Common English name(s): Cape Town
- Official English name(s): Cape Town
- Adjectival(s): Capetonian
- Demonym(s): Capetonian

== Geography of Cape Town ==
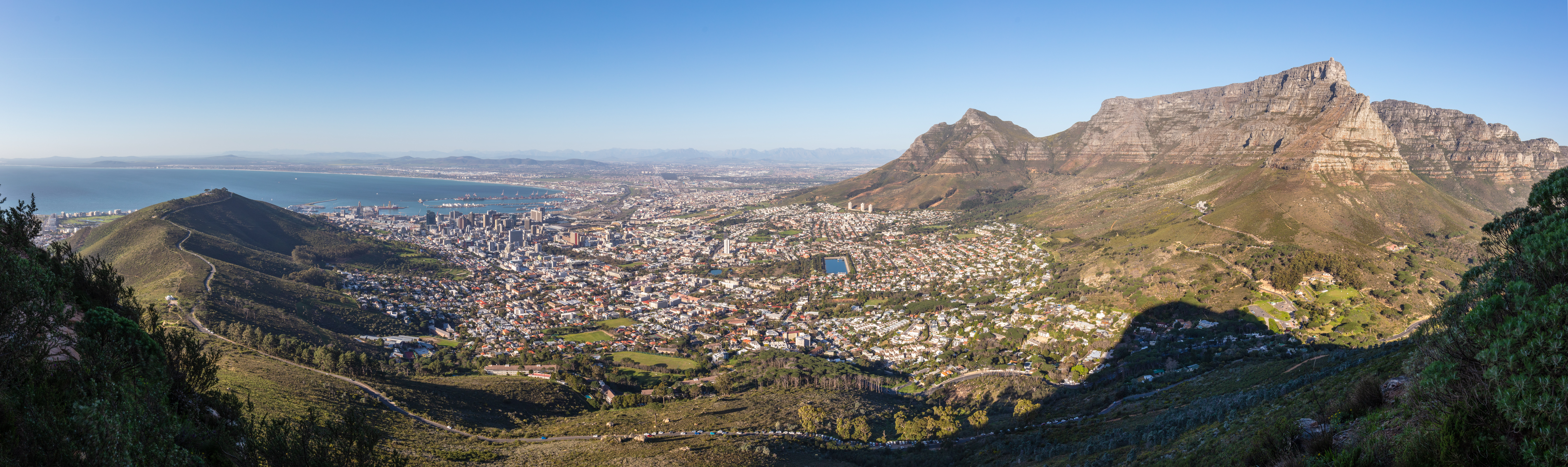
Cape Town viewed from Lion's Head

Geography of Cape Town

- Cape Town is:
  - a city
    - capital of Western Cape
- Population of Cape Town: 4772, 846
- Area of Cape Town: of 2 461 km2 (950 sq mi)

Cape Town Kaapstad
- Location within South Africa
- Coordinates: 33°55′31″S 18°25′26″E

=== Location of Cape Town ===
- Cape Town is situated within the following regions:
  - Southern Hemisphere and Eastern Hemisphere
    - Afro-Eurasia
      - Africa (outline)
        - Southern Africa
          - South Africa (outline)
            - Western Cape
              - City of Cape Town
- Time zone(s):
  - South African Standard Time (UTC+02)

=== Environment of Cape Town ===
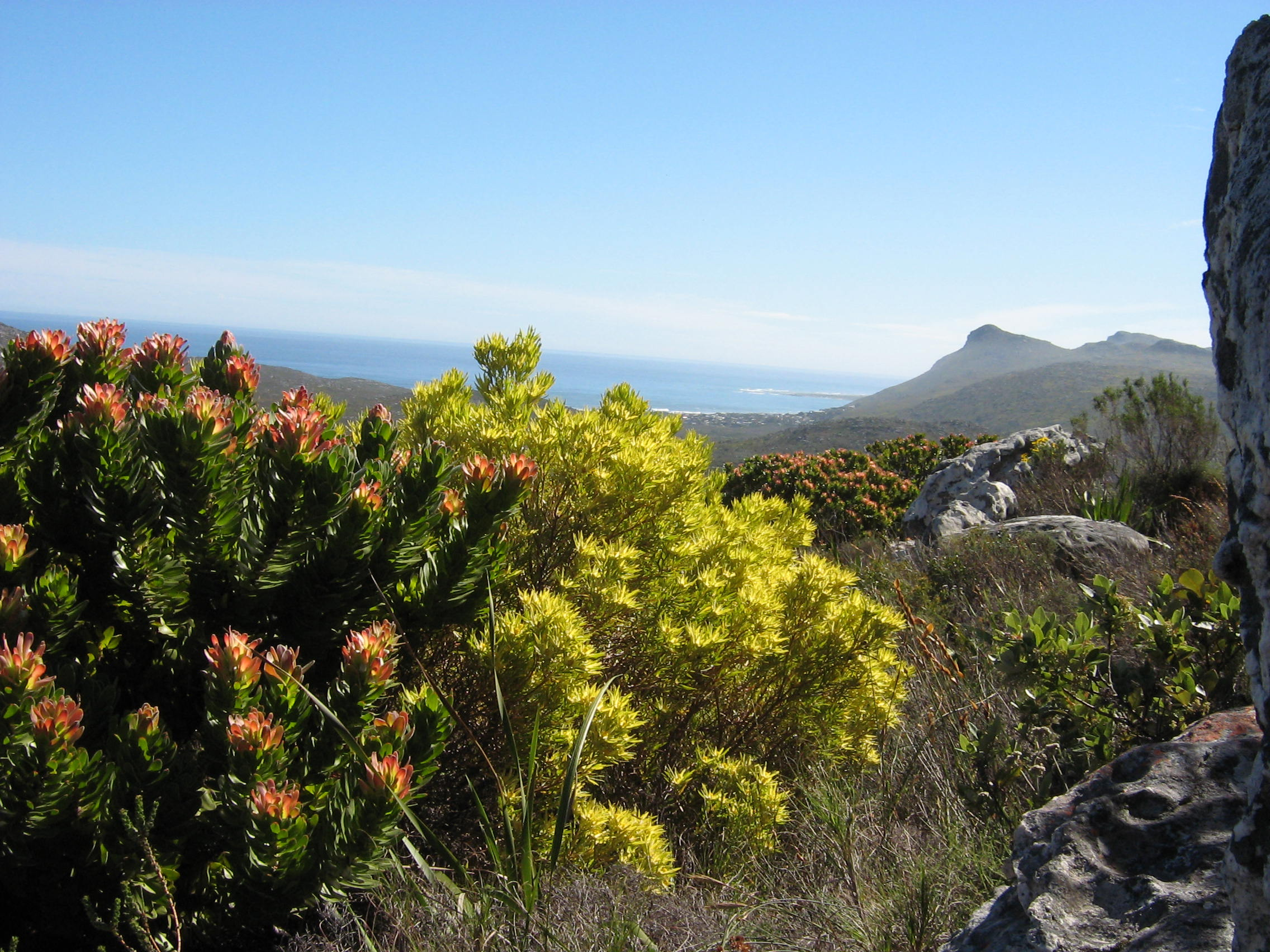
Peninsula Sandstone Fynbos growing in Table Mountain National Park

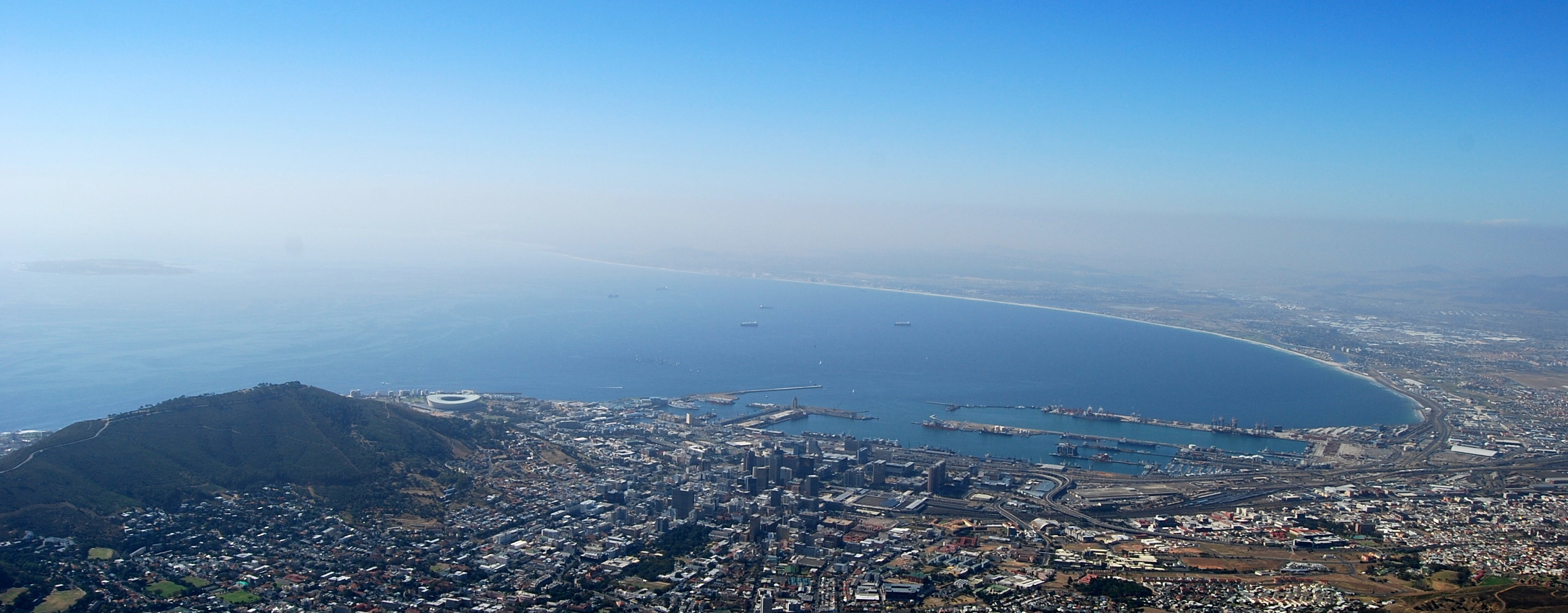
Table Bay

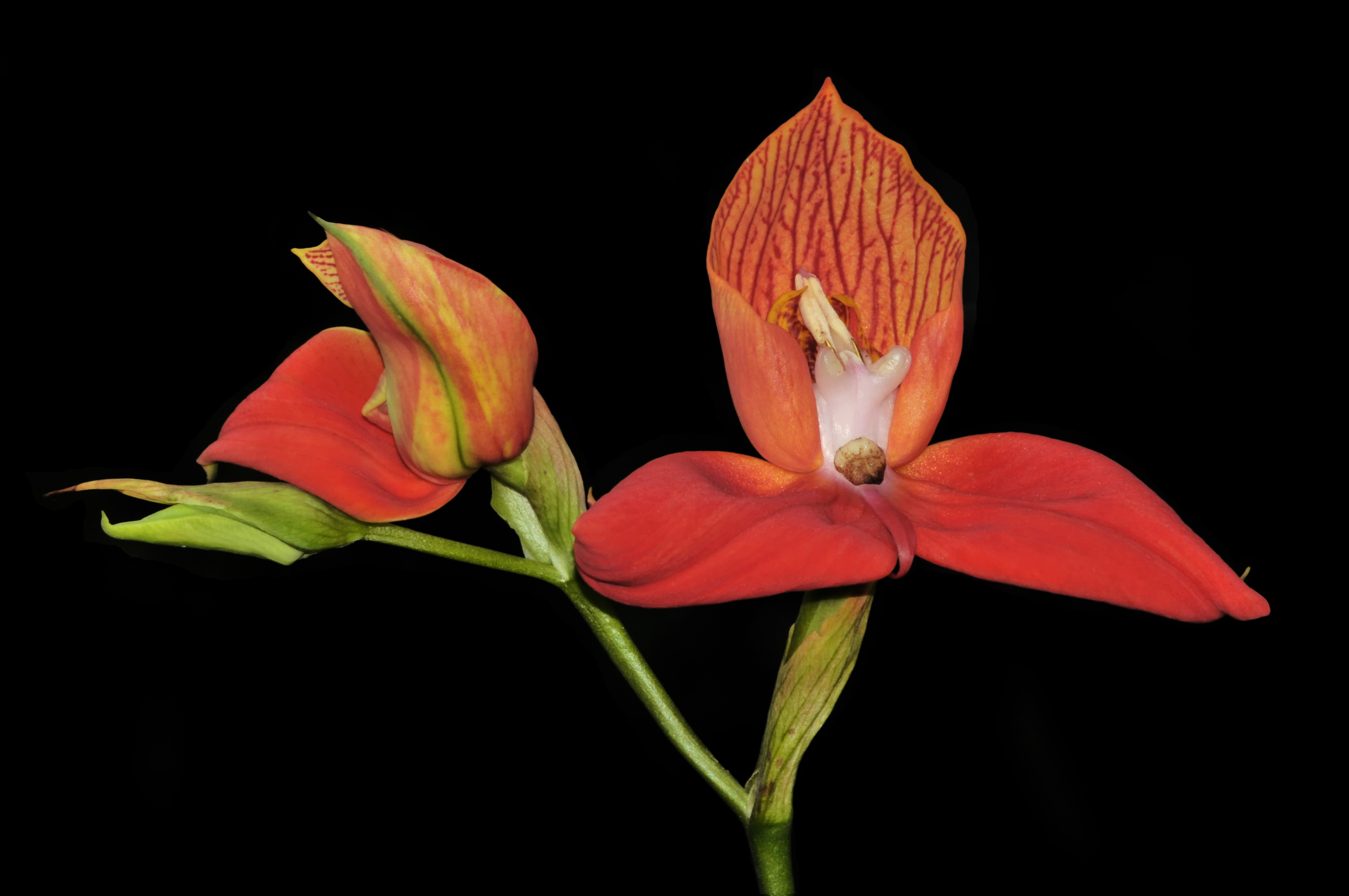
Pride of Table Mountain (Disa uniflora), an orchid common on Table Mountain

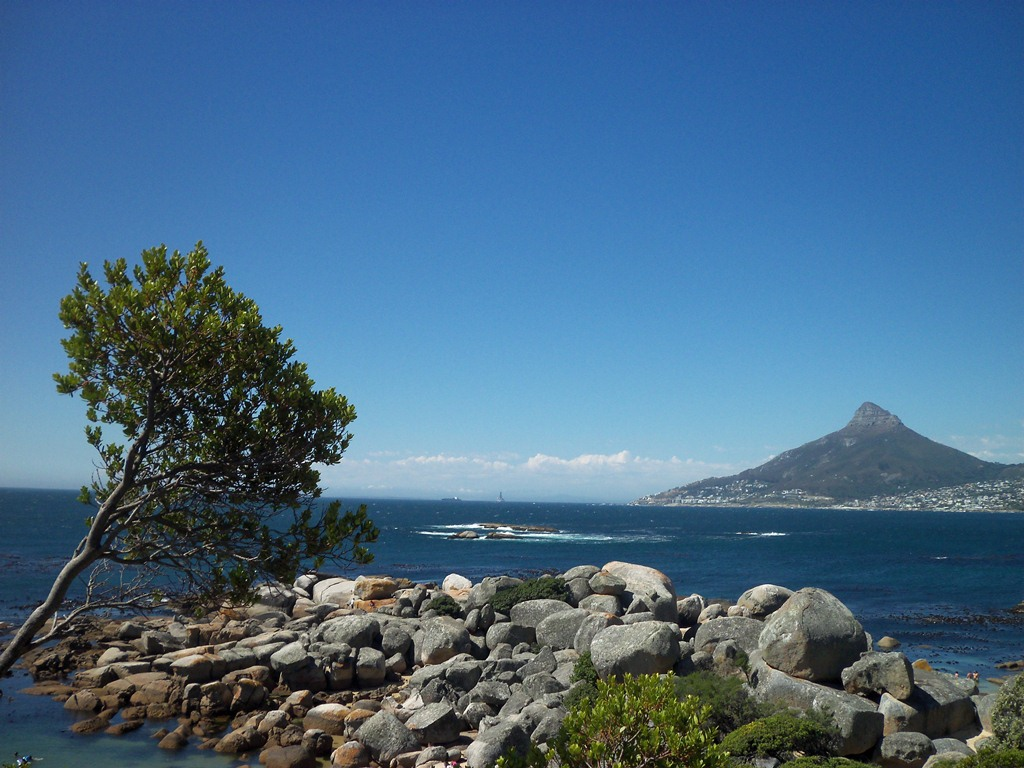
View of Lion's Head

- Biodiversity of Cape Town
- Climate of Cape Town
- Nature reserves in Cape Town
  - Table Mountain National Park
- Water crisis in Cape Town

==== Natural geographic features of Cape Town ====
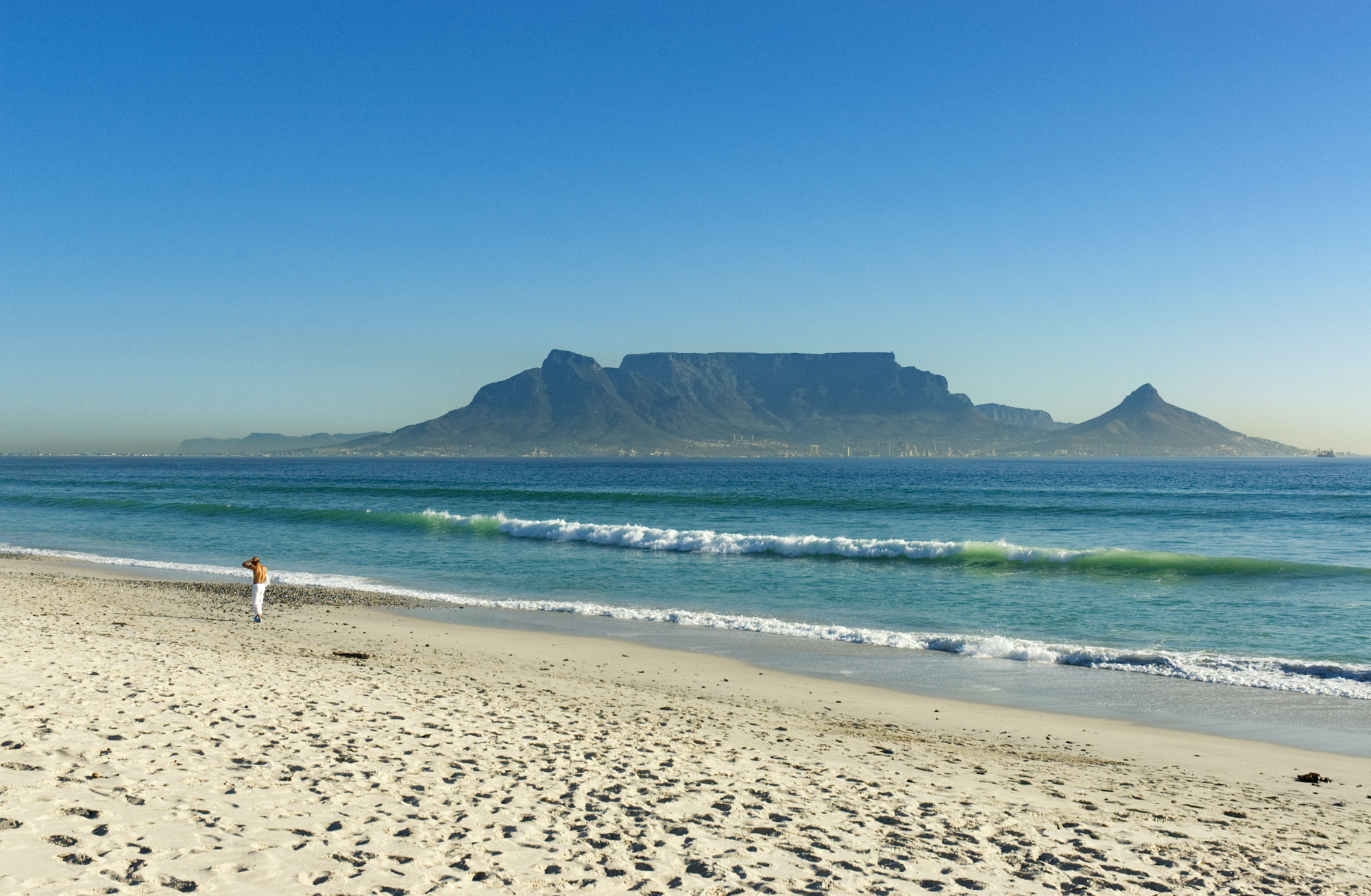
View of Table Mountain seen from Bloubergstrand, flanked by Devil's Peak on the left and Lion's Head on the right

- Bays
  - Camps Bay
  - False Bay
  - Gordon's Bay
  - Hout Bay
  - Simon's Bay
  - Table Bay
- Beaches of Cape Town
- Hills
  - Signal Hill
- Mountains
  - Devil's Peak
  - Lion's Head
  - Table Mountain
- Islands
  - Robben Island
- Rivers
  - Eerste River
  - Salt River
    - Black River
    - Elsieskraal River
    - Liesbeek River

=== Regions of Cape Town ===
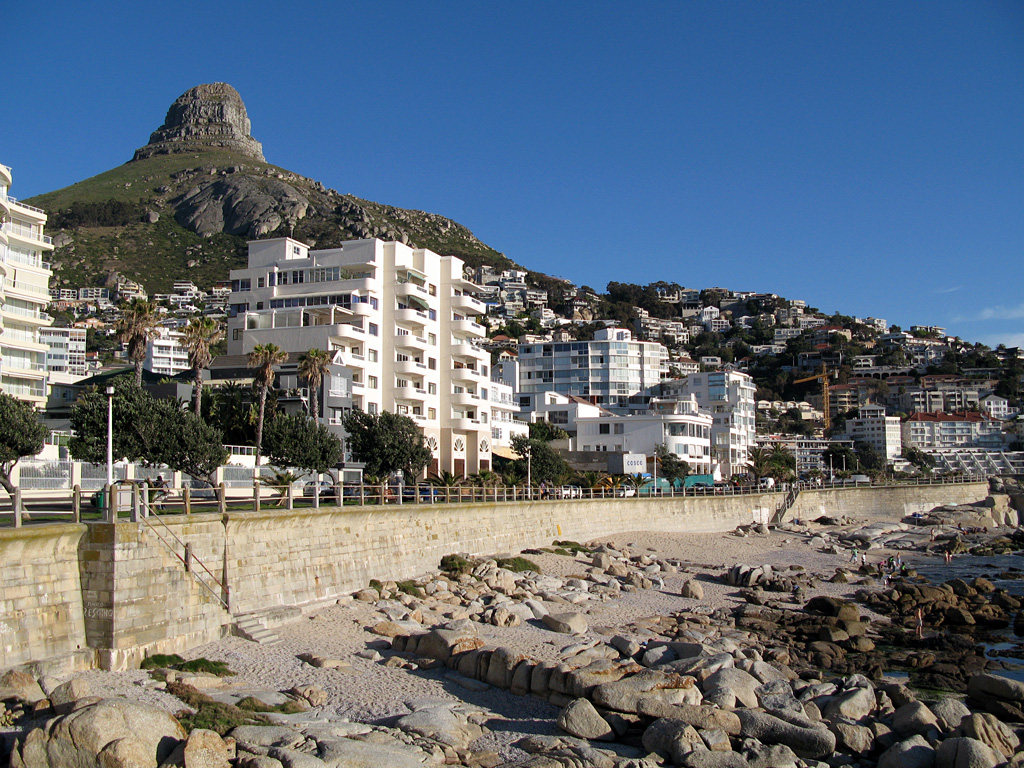
Bantry Bay

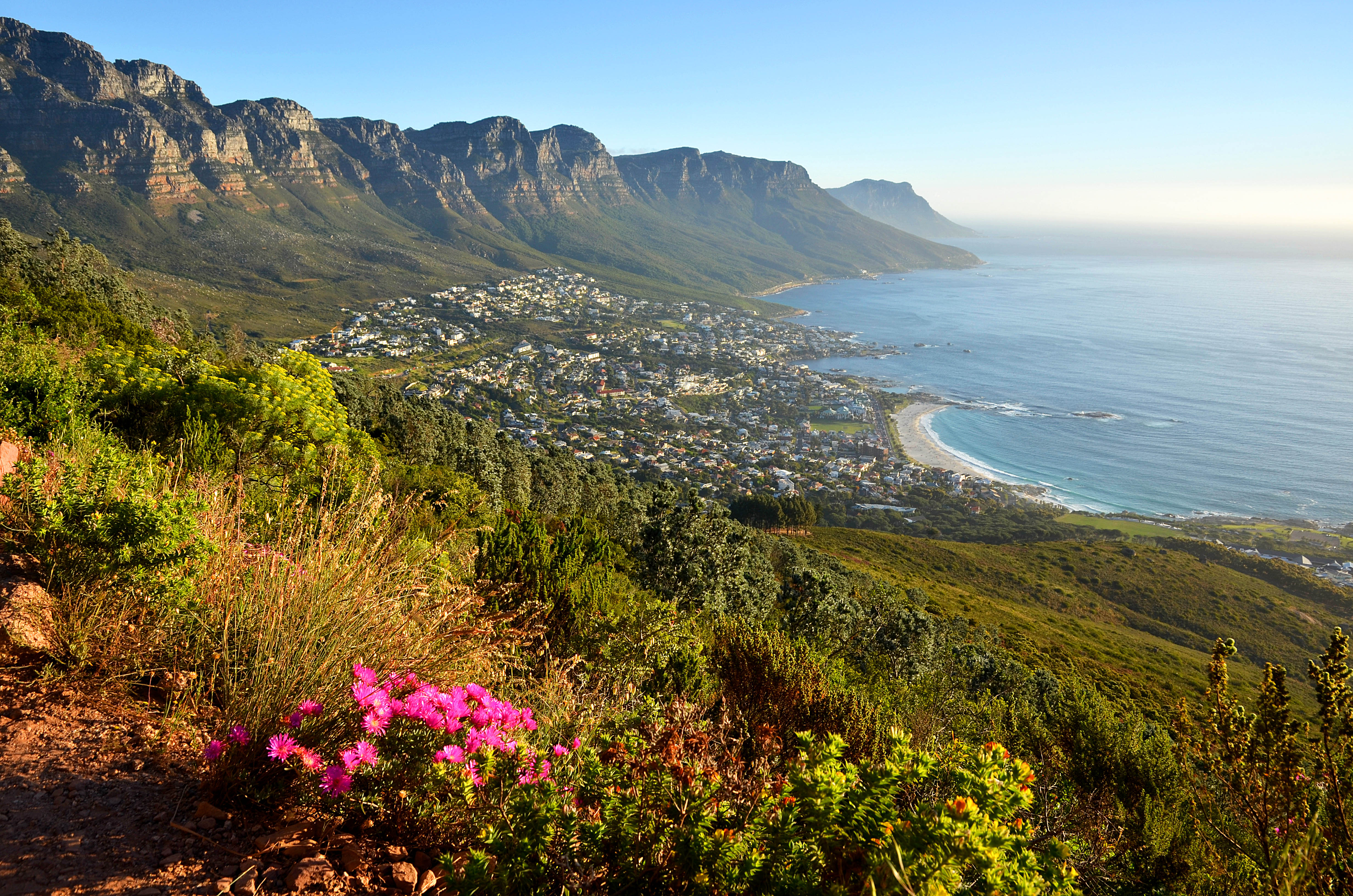
Camps Bay, an affluent suburb of Cape Town

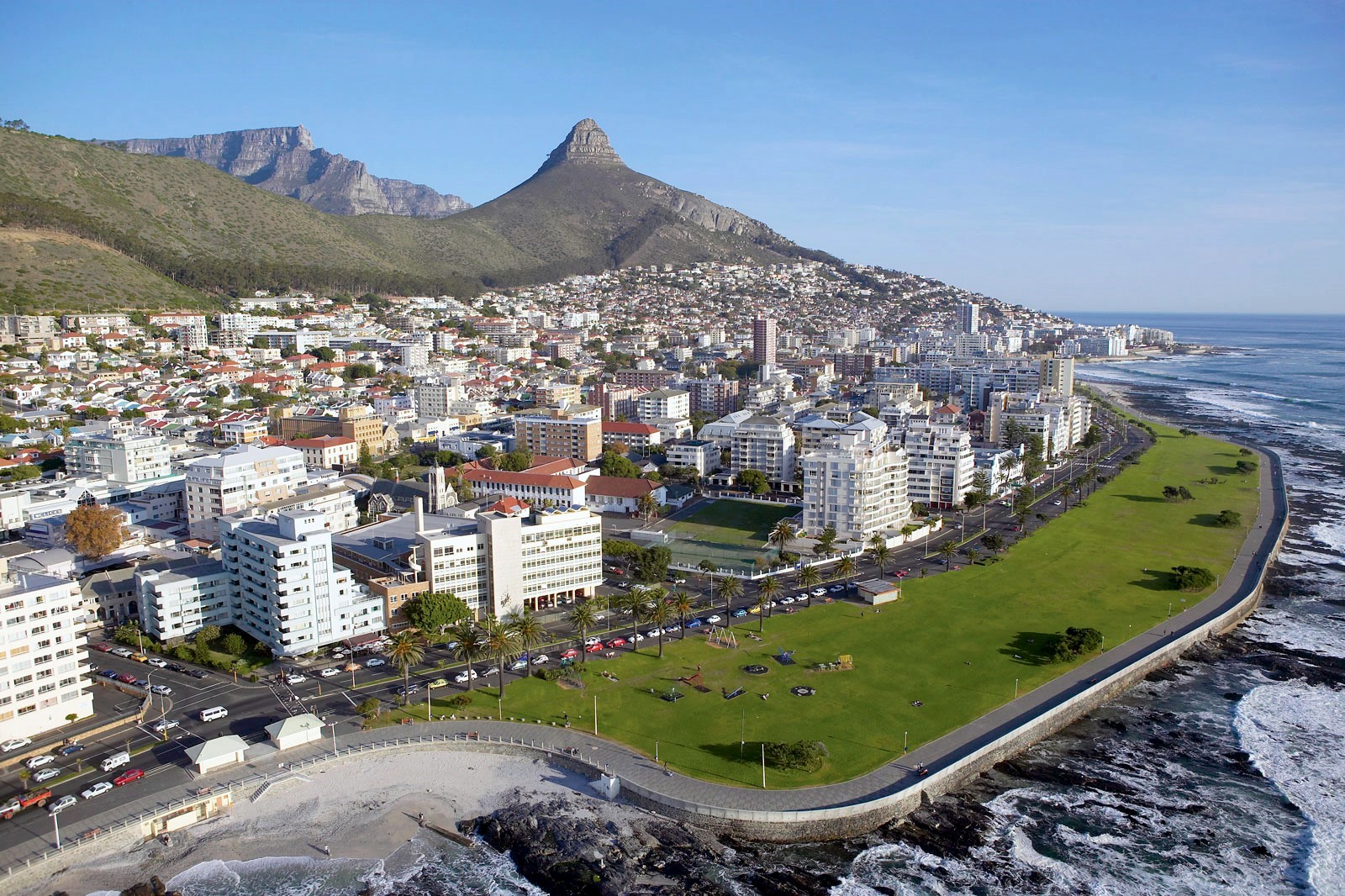
Sea Point, one of Cape Town's most affluent and densely populated suburbs

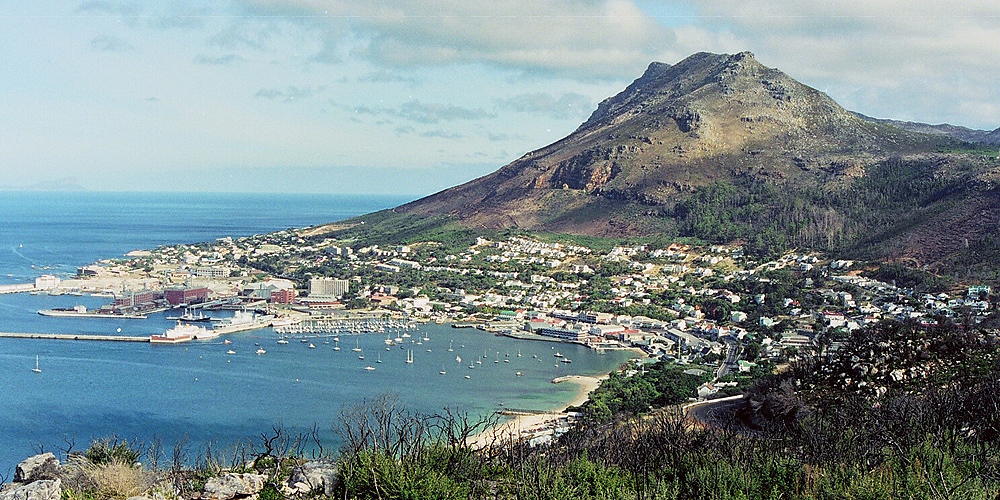
View of Simon's Town

- Atlantic Seaboard
- Cape Flats
- City Bowl
- Helderberg
- Northern Suburbs
- Southern Suburbs
- South Peninsula

==== Suburbs of Cape Town ====
Suburbs of Cape Town

- Athlone
- Bakoven
- Bantry Bay
- Belhar
- Bellville
- Bergvliet
- Bishop Lavis
- Bishopscourt
- Bloubergstrand
- Blue Downs
- Bo-Kaap
- Bonteheuwel
- Bothasig
- Brackenfell
- Brooklyn
- Camps Bay
- Capri Village
- Century City
- Claremont
- Clifton
- Clovelly
- Constantia
- Crawford
- Da Gama Park
- Delft
- Devil's Peak Estate
- Diep River
- Durbanville
- Edgemead
- Eerste River
- Elsie's River
- Epping
- Faure
- Fish Hoek
- Fresnaye
- Gardens
- Glencairn
- Goodwood
- Grassy Park
- Green Point
- Gugulethu
- Hanover Park
- Harfield Village
- Heathfield
- Higgovale
- Hout Bay
- Imizamo Yethu
- Kalk Bay
- Kenilworth
- Kensington
- Kenwyn
- Khayelitsha
- Kommetjie
- Kraaifontein
- Kuils River
- Langa
- Lansdowne
- Lavender Hill
- Llandudno
- Lotus River
- Lwandle
- Macassar
- Maitland
- Manenberg
- Masiphumelele
- Meadowridge
- Melkbosstrand
- Milnerton
- Mitchells Plain
- Monte Vista
- Mouille Point
- Mowbray
- Muizenberg
- Ndabeni
- Newlands
- Noordhoek
- Nyanga
- Observatory
- Ocean View
- Ottery
- Oranjezicht
- Panorama
- Parklands
- Parow
- Philippi
- Pinelands
- Plumstead
- Retreat
- Richwood
- Rondebosch
- Rondebosch East
- Rosebank
- Salt River
- Scarborough
- Schotsche Kloof
- Sea Point
- Simon's Town
- St James
- Steenberg
- Strandfontein
- Table View
- Tamboerskloof
- Thornton
- Three Anchor Bay
- Tokai
- University Estate
- Vredehoek
- Walmer Estate
- Wetton
- Woodstock
- Wynberg
- Zonnebloem

==== Neighbourhoods of Cape Town ====
- De Waterkant
- Victoria & Alfred Waterfront

== Places of interest in Cape Town ==
The Cape Town International Convention Centre

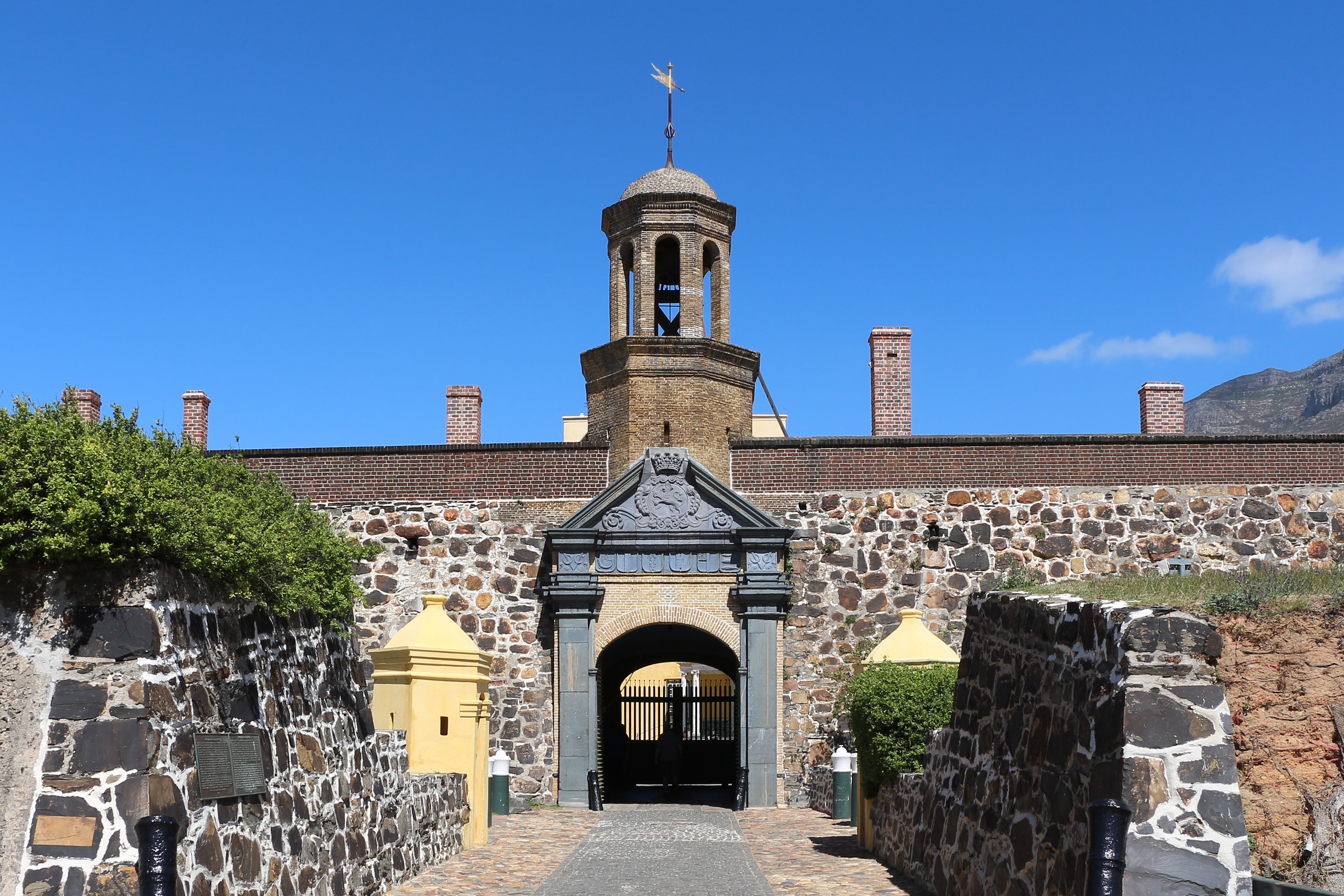
The Castle of Good Hope

=== Bridges of Cape Town ===
- Foreshore Freeway Bridge

=== Cultural and exhibition centres of Cape Town ===
- Cape Town International Convention Centre
- Good Hope Centre

=== Fortifications of Cape Town ===
Fortifications of the Cape Peninsula

- Castle of Good Hope
- Chavonnes Battery
- Fort de Goede Hoop

=== Monuments and memorials of Cape Town ===
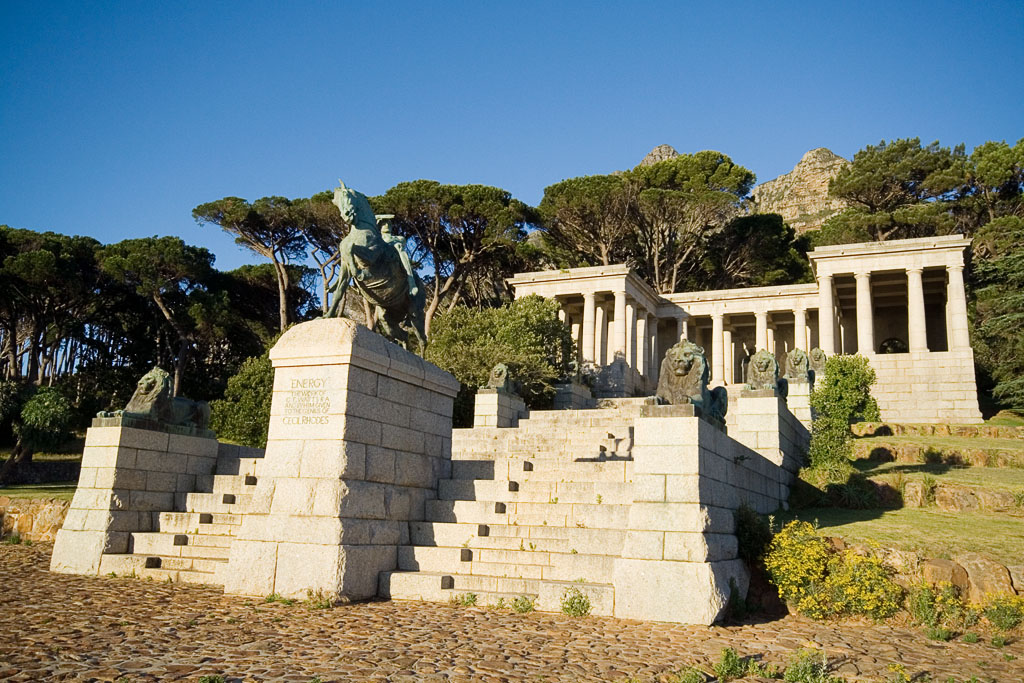
The Rhodes Memorial

- Artillery Memorial, Cape Town
- Japanese Lantern Monument
- Rhodes Memorial
- The Cenotaph
- Treaty Tree

=== Museums and art galleries of Cape Town ===
Iziko South African National Gallery

Museums in Cape Town

- Cape Town Science Centre
- District Six Museum
- Groot Constantia
- Groote Schuur
- Heart of Cape Town Museum
- Iziko South African Museum
- Iziko South African National Gallery
- Koopmans-de Wet House
- Slave Lodge
- South African Sendinggestig Museum
- Waterworks Museum
- Zeitz Museum of Contemporary Art Africa

=== Parks and gardens of Cape Town ===
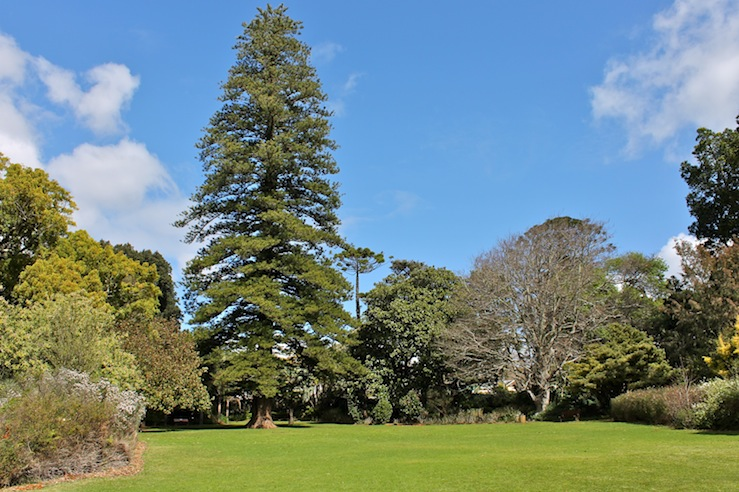
Arderne Gardens

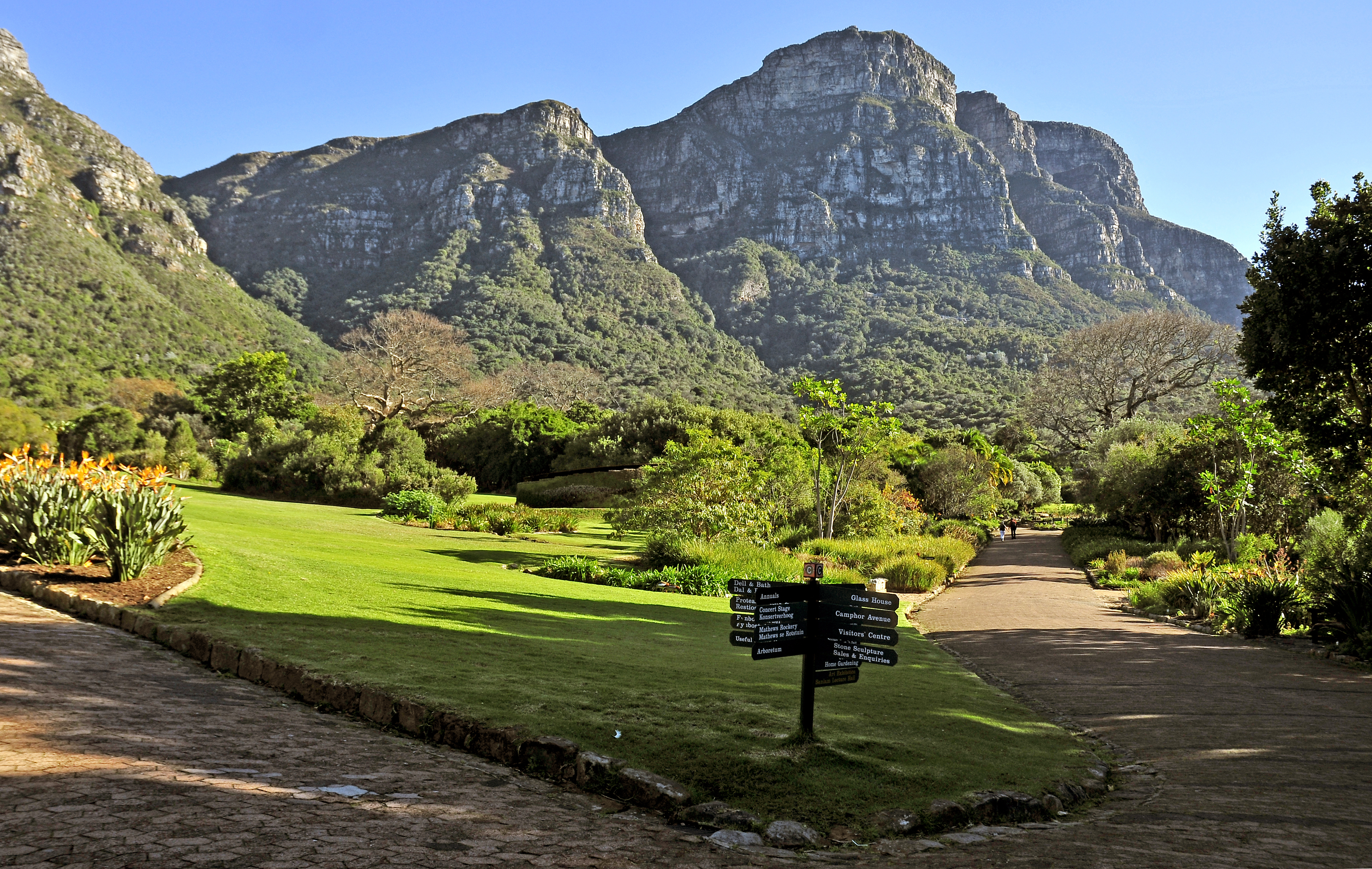
Kirstenbosch National Botanical Garden

- Arderne Gardens
- Company's Garden
- De Waal Park
- Green Point Common
- Helderberg Nature Reserve
- Keurboom Park
- Kirstenbosch National Botanical Garden
- Rondebosch Common
- Rondebosch Park
- Tokai Arboretum
- Tokai Park
- Wynberg Park

=== Public squares of Cape Town ===
- Grand Parade
- Greenmarket Square

=== Religious buildings of Cape Town ===
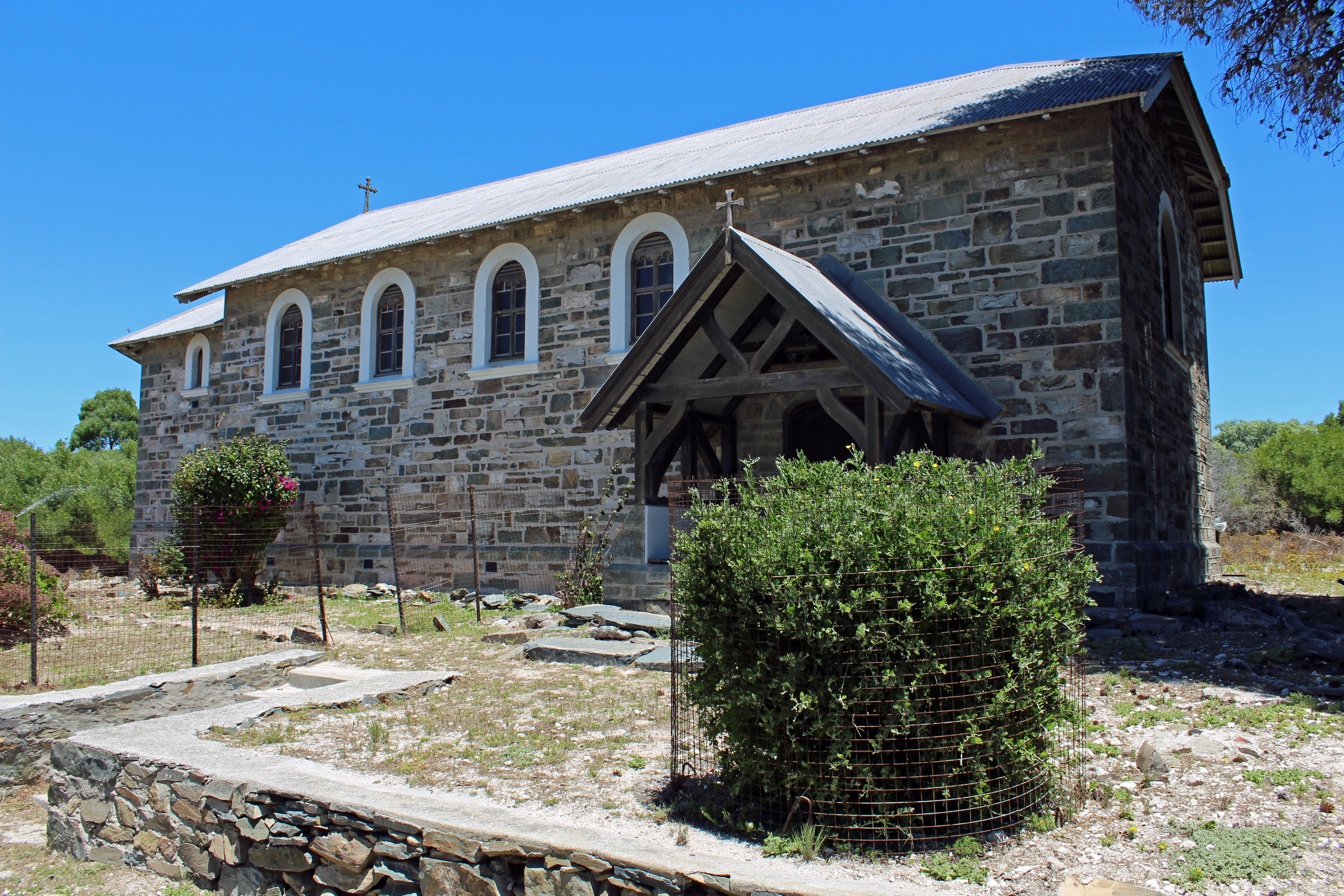
Church of the Good Shepherd on Robben Island

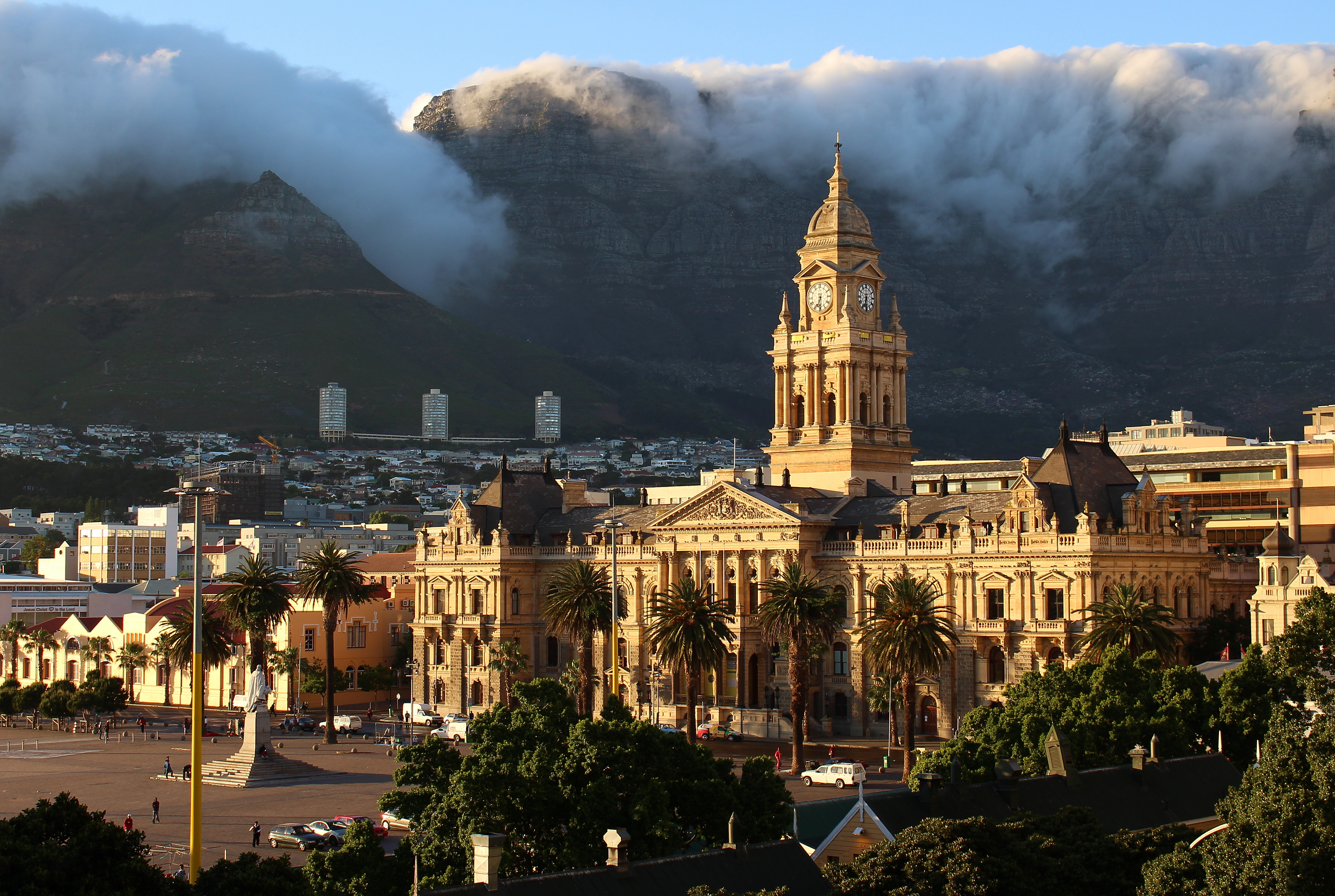
The Cape Town City Hall, with Table Mountain in the background

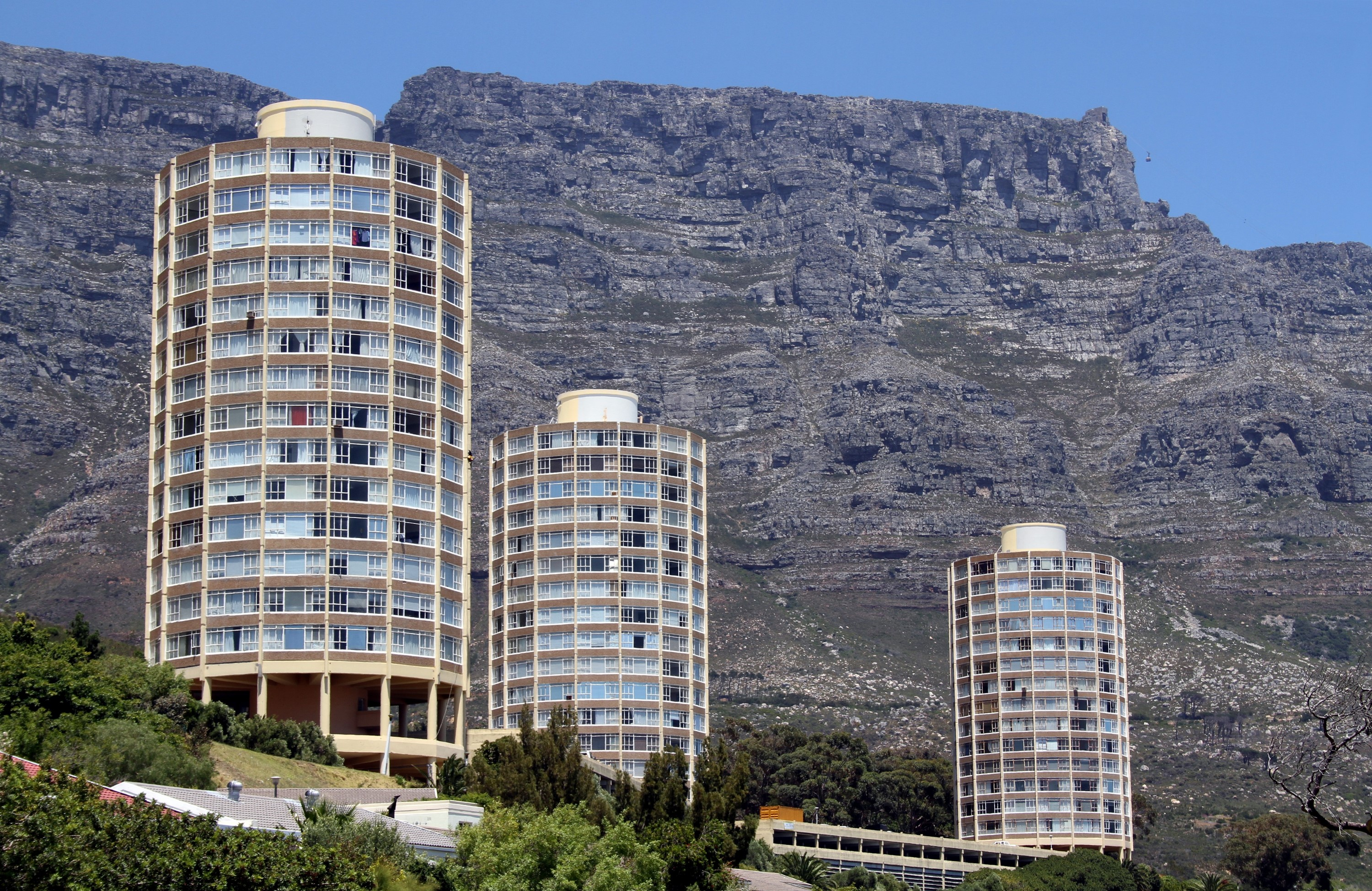
Disa Park

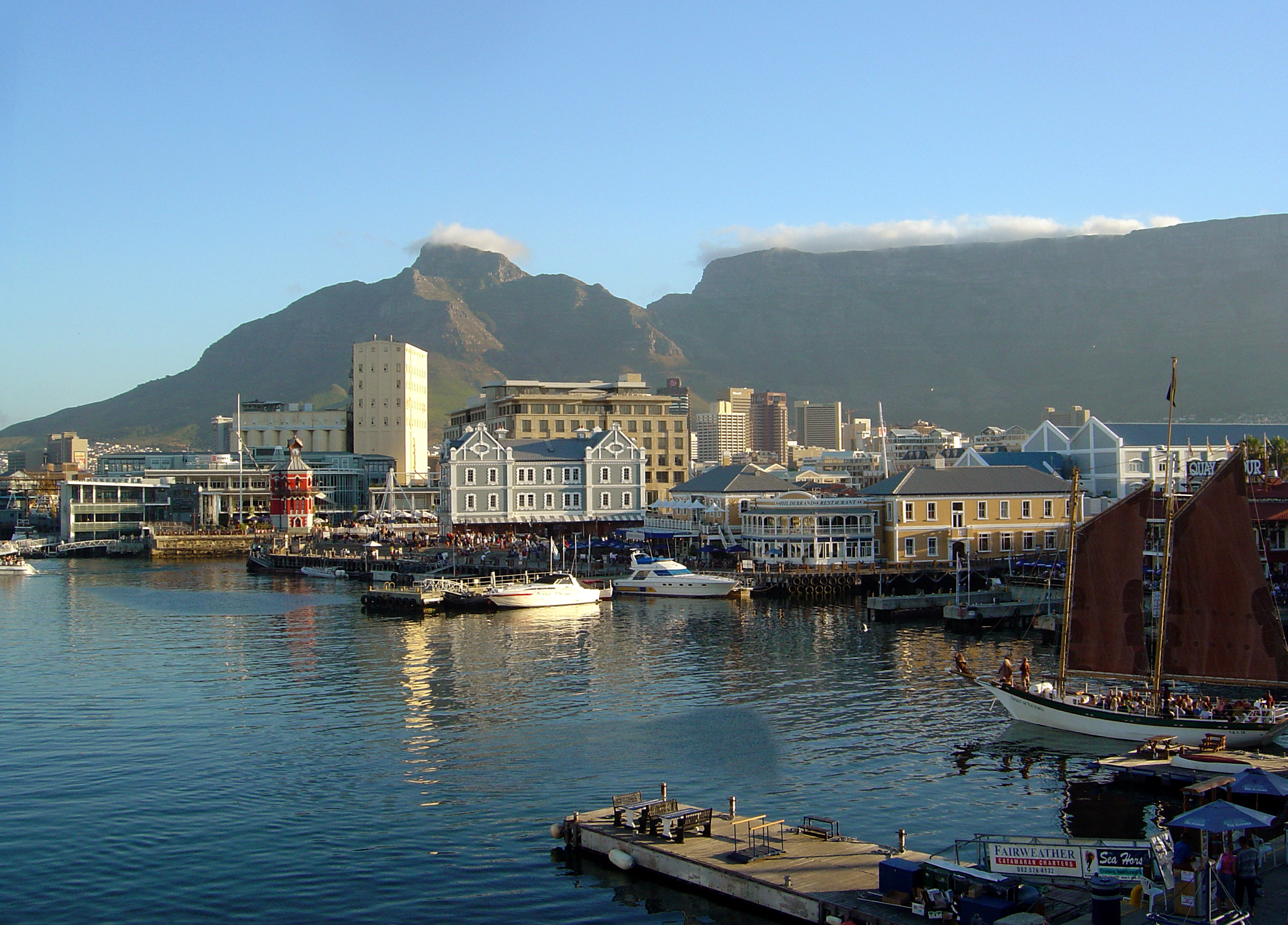
Victoria & Alfred Waterfront

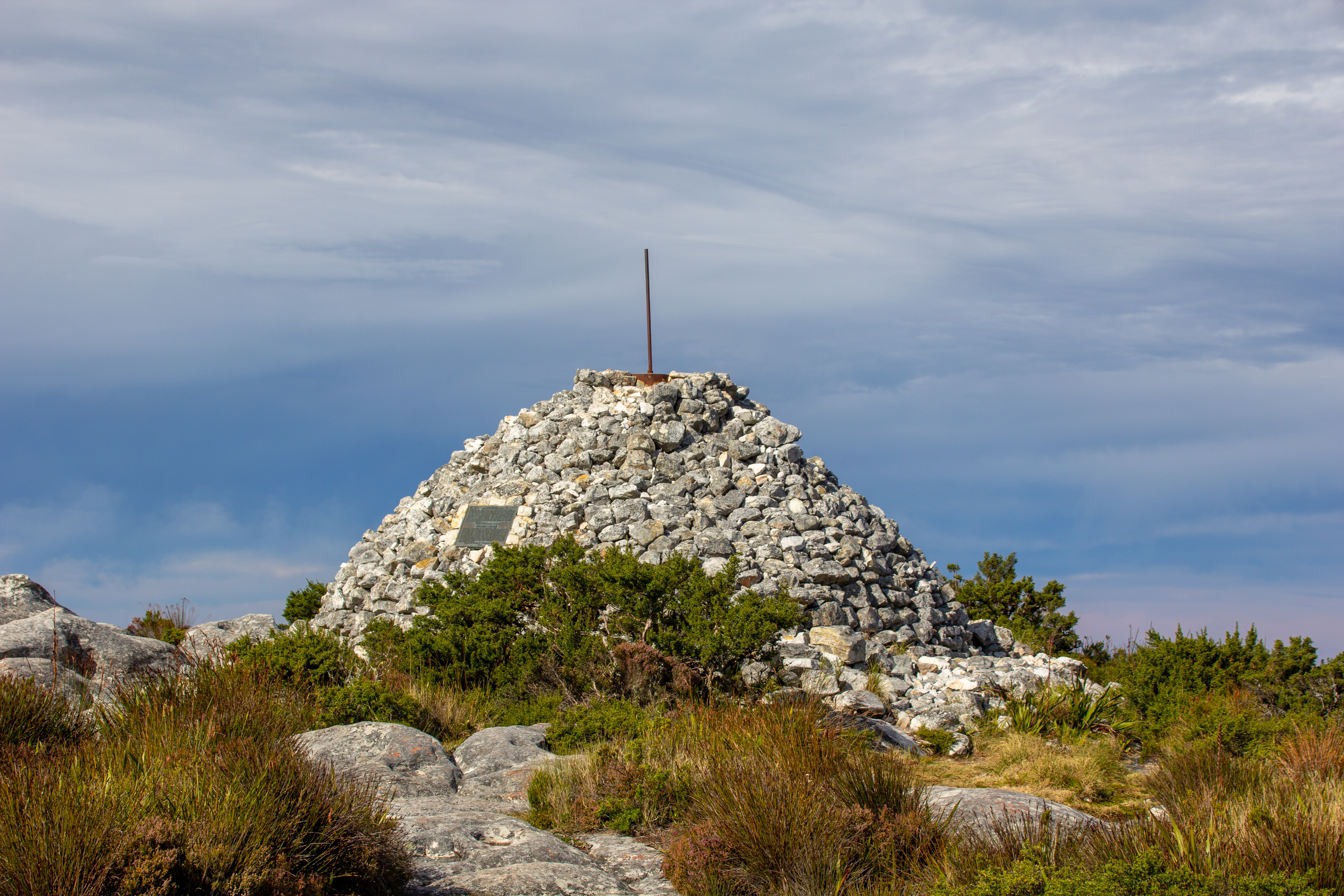
Maclear's Beacon, a triangulation station used in the calculation of the curvature of the Earth

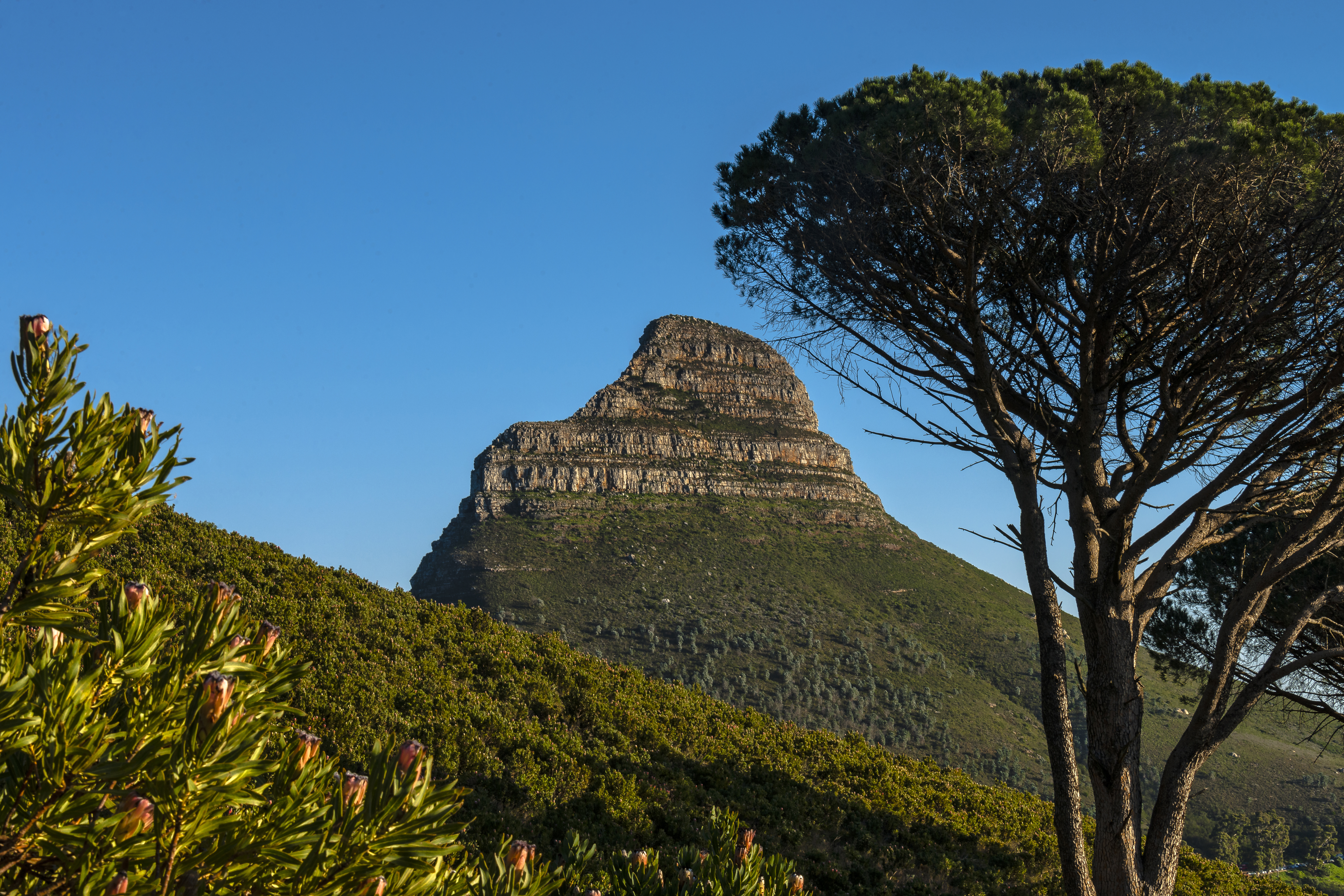
Lion's Head, part of the Table Mountain National Park

- Auwal Mosque
- Gardens Shul
- Groote Kerk
- Lutheran Church in Strand Street
- Palm Tree Mosque
- Queen Victoria mosque
- St. George's Cathedral
- St. James Church
- St. Mary's Cathedral

=== Secular buildings of Cape Town ===
- Atterbury House
- Cape Town City Hall
- Cape Town Civic Centre
- Centre for the Book
- Coornhoop
- Disa Park
- Genadendal Residence
- Hawthorndon House
- Houses of Parliament
- Huguenot Memorial Building
- Leeuwenhof
- Metlife Centre
- Mutual Building
- Naspers Centre
- Portside Tower
- Royal Observatory, Cape of Good Hope
- Triangle House

=== Shopping areas, malls and markets of Cape Town ===
- Canal Walk
- Somerset Mall
- Victoria & Alfred Waterfront

=== Streets of Cape Town ===
- Adderley Street
- Long Street
- Strand Street

=== Theatres of Cape Town ===
- Baxter Theatre Centre
- Labia Theatre
- Space Theatre
- The Independent Armchair Theatre

=== Triangulation station ===
- Maclear's Beacon

=== World Heritage Sites of Cape Town ===
- Cape Floristic Region
  - Table Mountain National Park
- Robben Island

=== Demographics of Cape Town ===
Demographics of Cape Town

== Government and politics of Cape Town ==
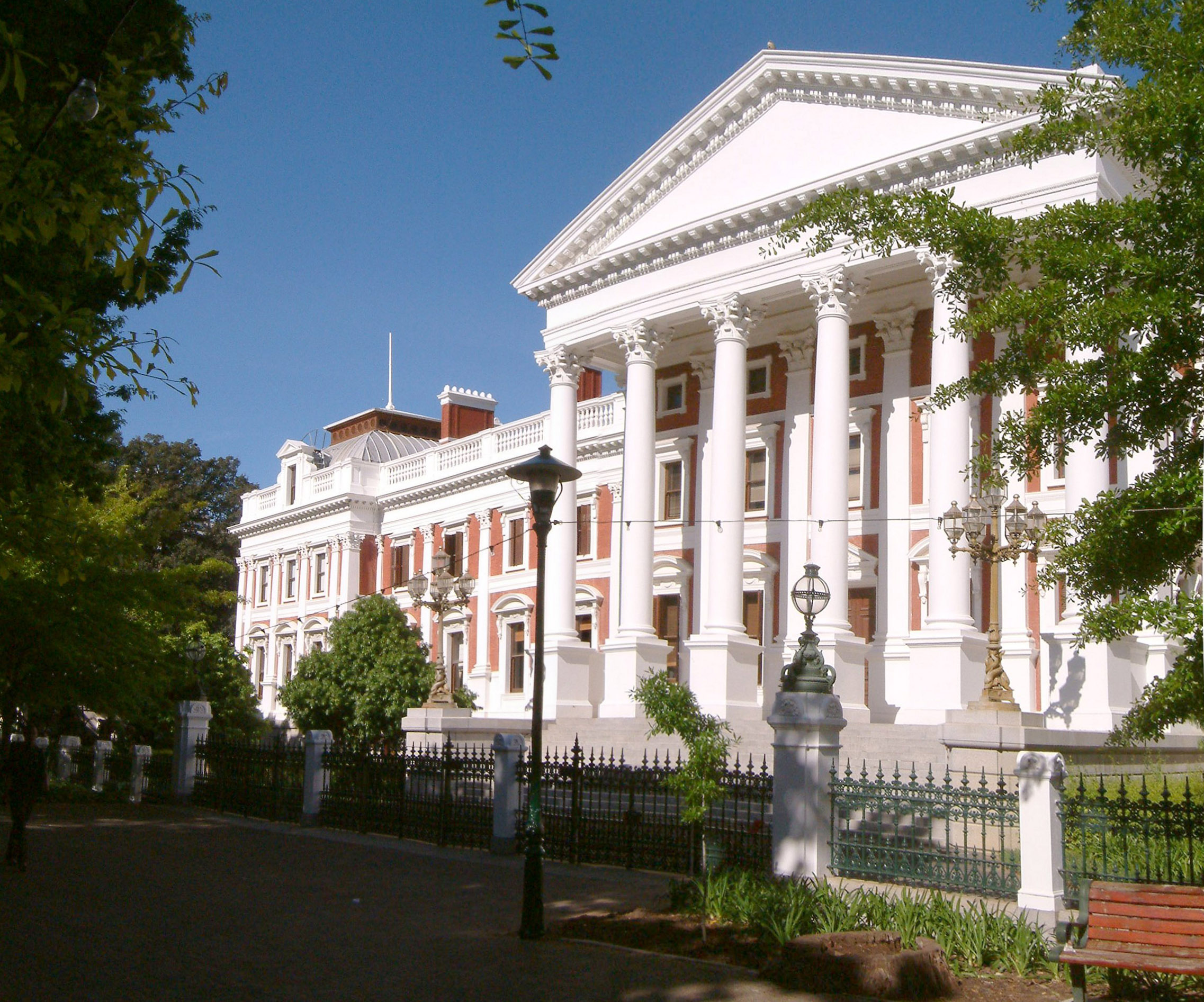
Houses of Parliament, the old assembly building

Politics of Cape Town

- Parliament of South Africa
  - Houses of Parliament
- Mayor of Cape Town
  - Deputy Mayor of Cape Town
- International relations of Cape Town
  - Twin towns and sister cities of Cape Town

=== Law and justice of Cape Town ===
- Law enforcement in Cape Town
  - Municipal Police

== History of Cape Town ==
- History of Cape Town
  - Invasion of the Cape Colony
  - Battle of Blaauwberg
  - Anglo-Dutch Treaty of 1814
  - Noon Gun
- Timeline of Cape Town

== Culture of Cape Town ==
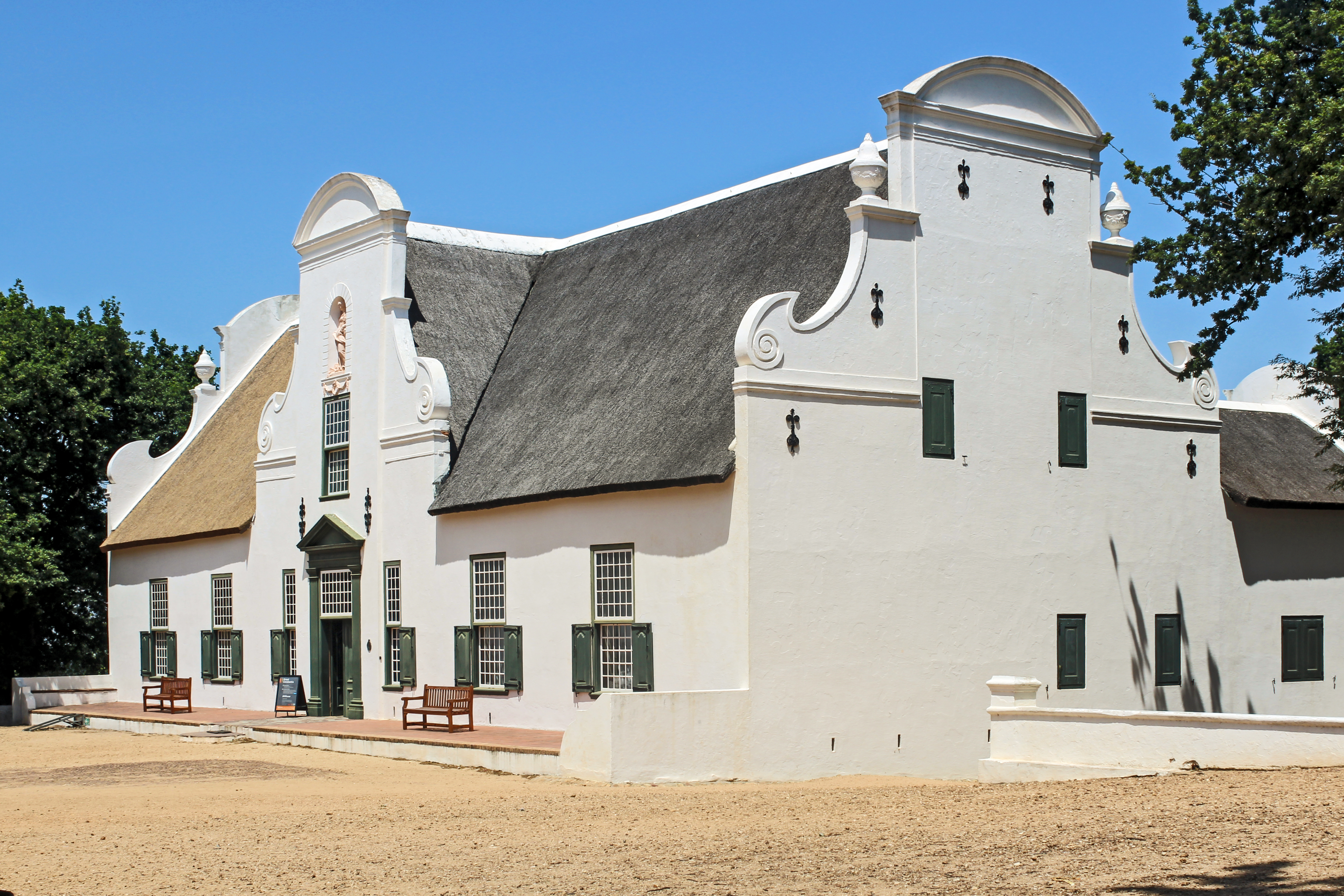
Cape Dutch architecture, a traditional Afrikaner architectural style found mostly in the Western Cape

=== Arts of Cape Town ===
==== Architecture of Cape Town ====
Architecture of Cape Town

- Cape Dutch architecture
- Buildings in Cape Town
  - Tallest buildings in Cape Town

==== Music and dance of Cape Town ====
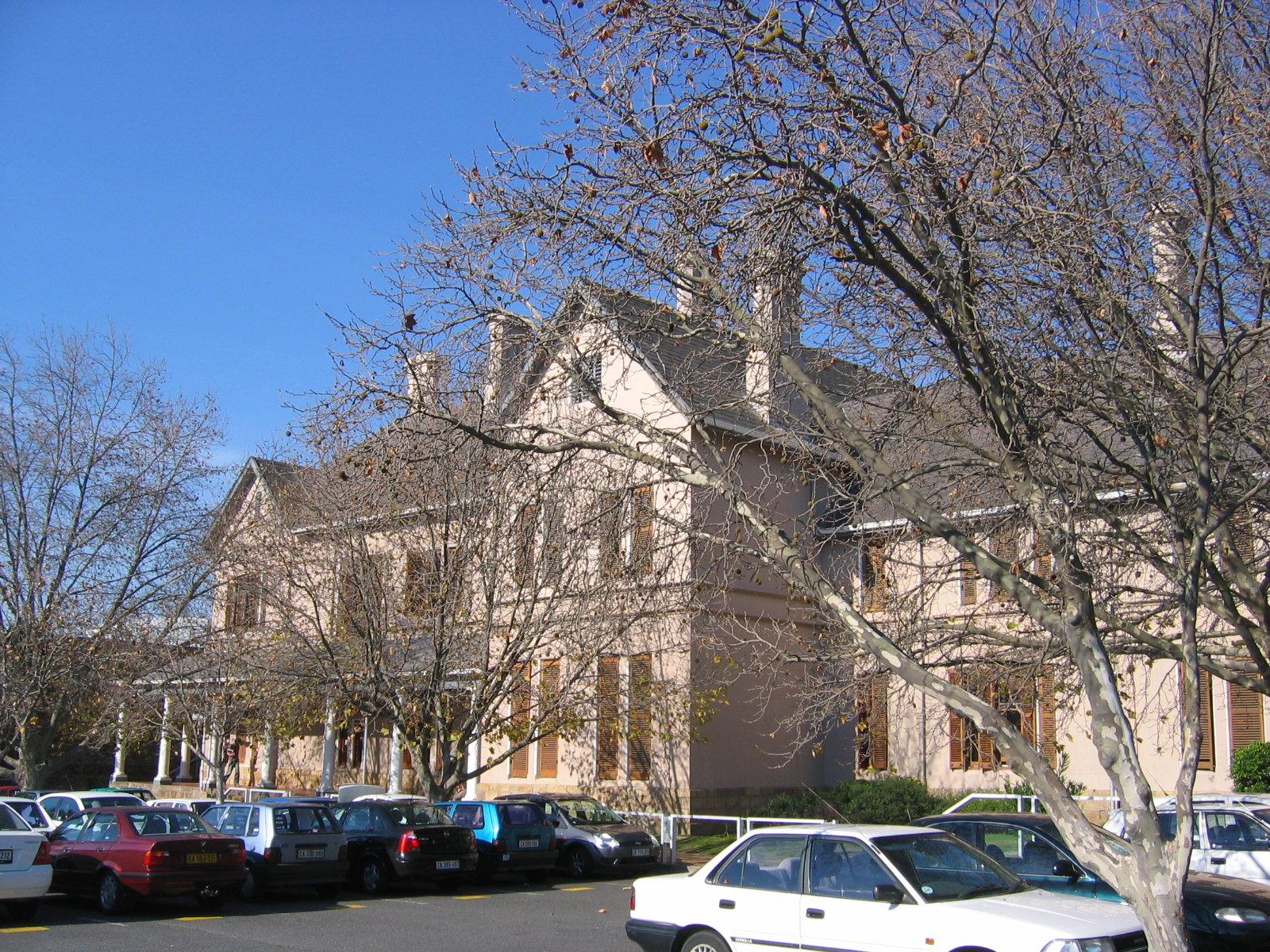
Strubenholm, the home of the South African College of Music

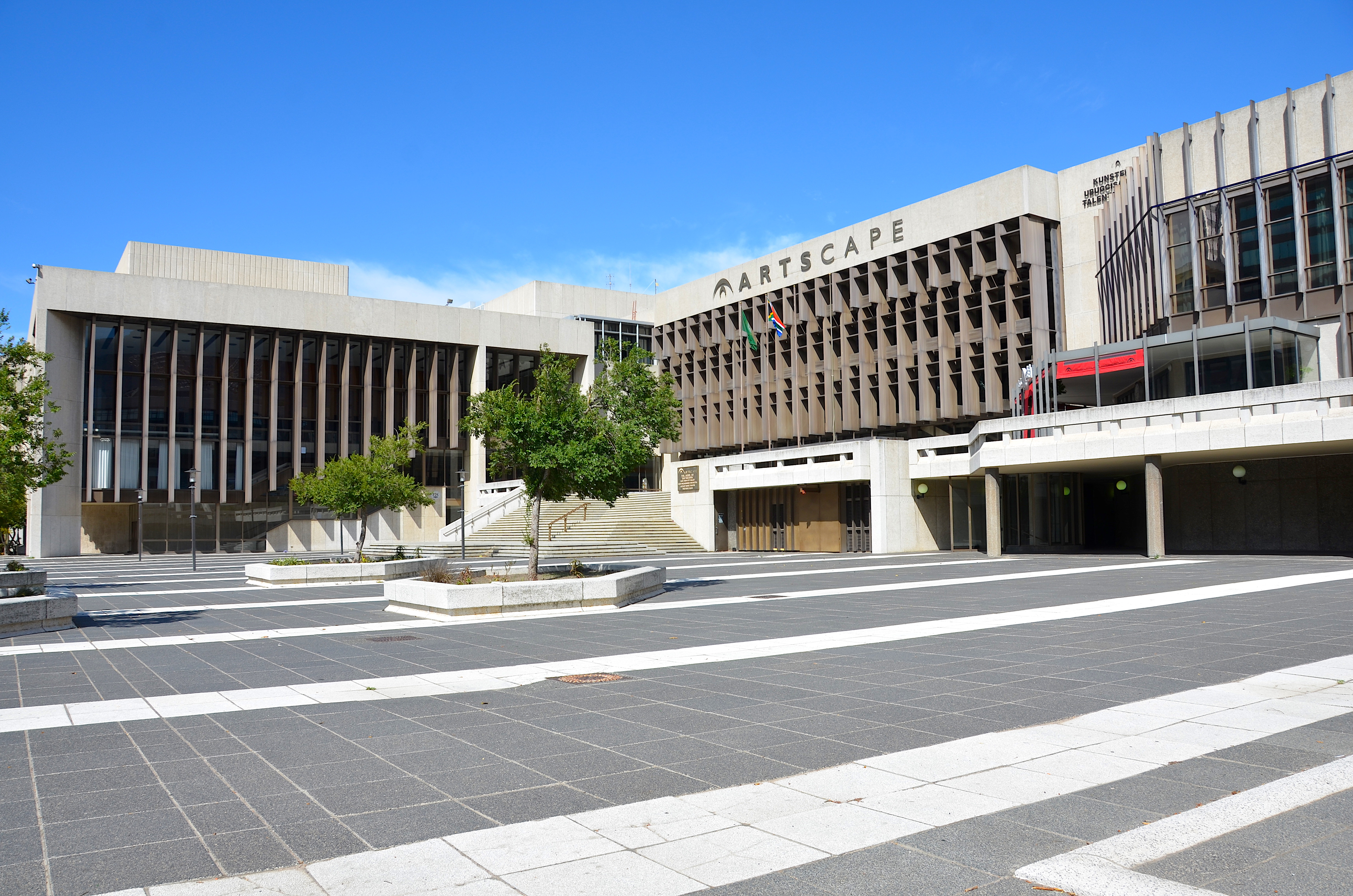
Artscape Theatre Centre, the main performing arts centre in Cape Town

- Ballet of Cape Town
  - Cape Town City Ballet
- Music festivals and competitions in Cairo
  - Cape Town International Jazz Festival
- Music schools in Cape Town
  - Hugo Lambrechts Music Centre
  - South African College of Music
- Music venues in Cape Town
  - Artscape Theatre Centre
- Musical ensembles in Cape Town
  - Cape Town Opera
  - Cape Town Philharmonia Choir
  - Cape Town Philharmonic Orchestra
- Musicians from Cape Town
  - Michael Blake
  - Victor Hely-Hutchinson
  - John Joubert

==== Theatre of Cape Town ====
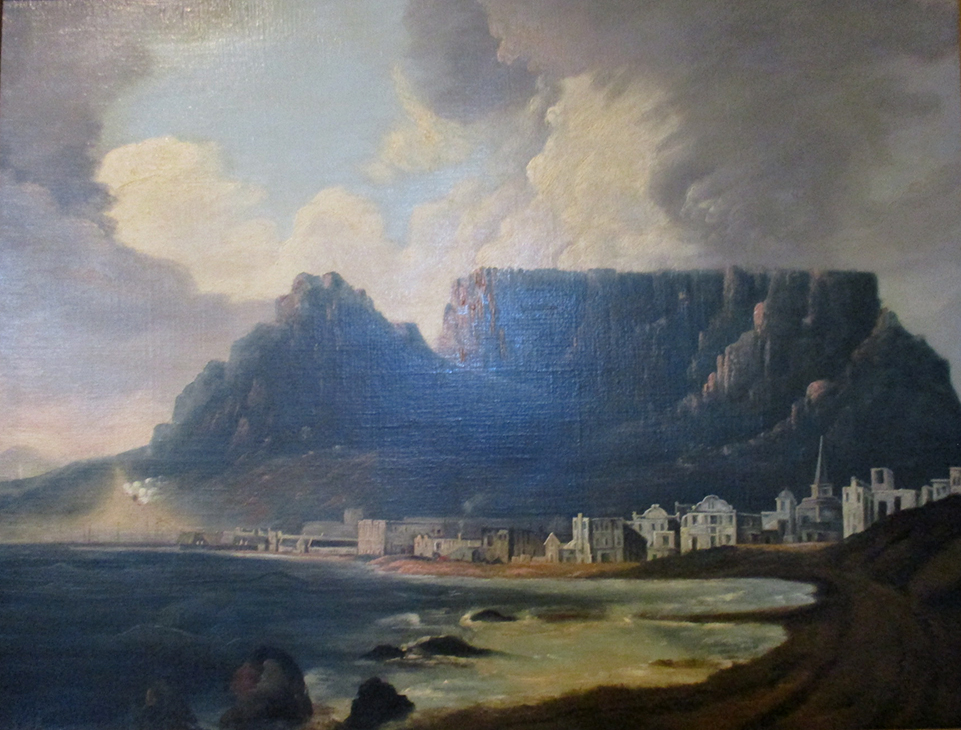
Cape Town in art: Table Mountain and Cape Town by William Hodges, Iziko William Fehr Collection

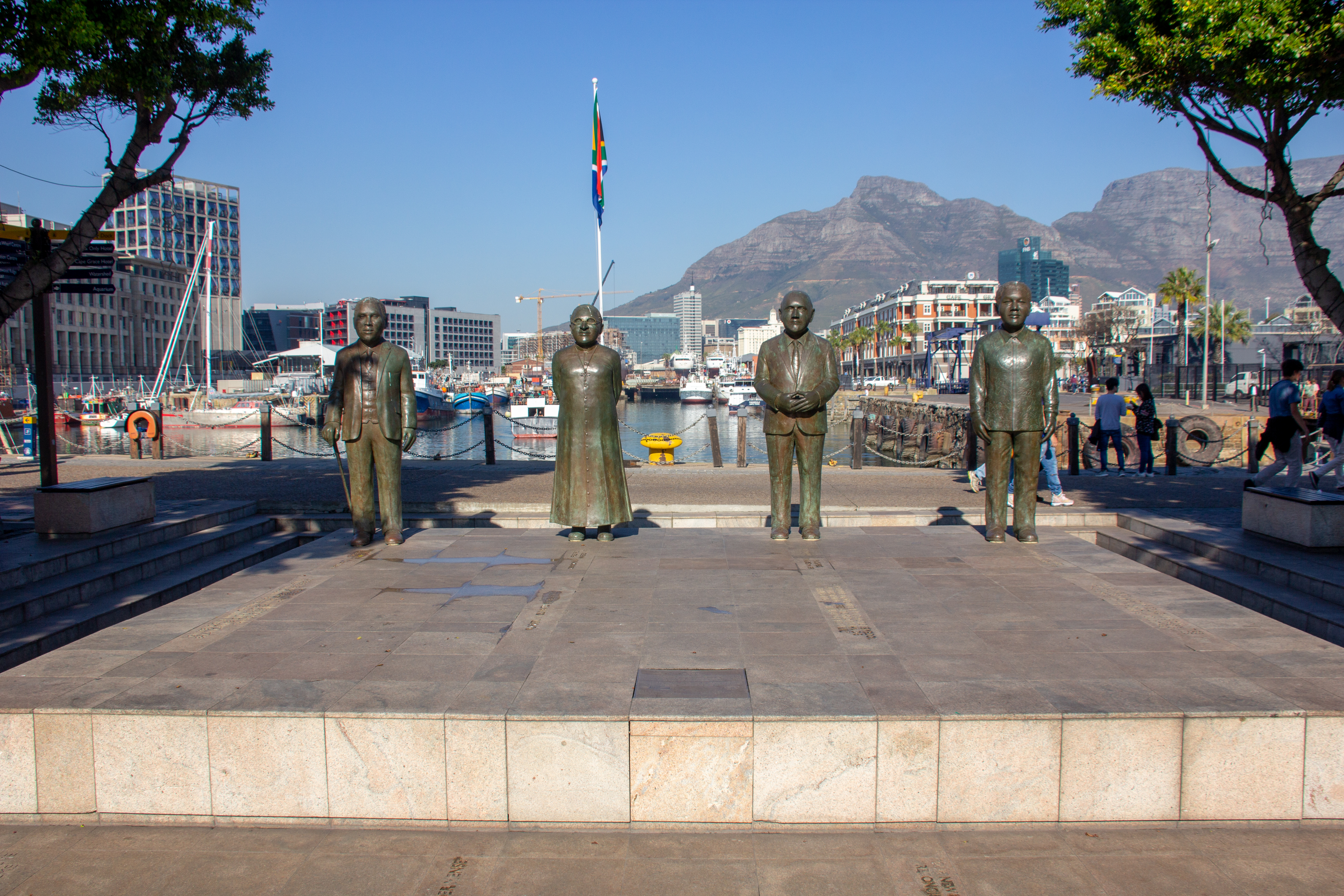
Public art in Cape Town: Statues of Nobel Prize winners at Nobel Square

- Magnet Theatre

==== Visual arts of Cape Town ====
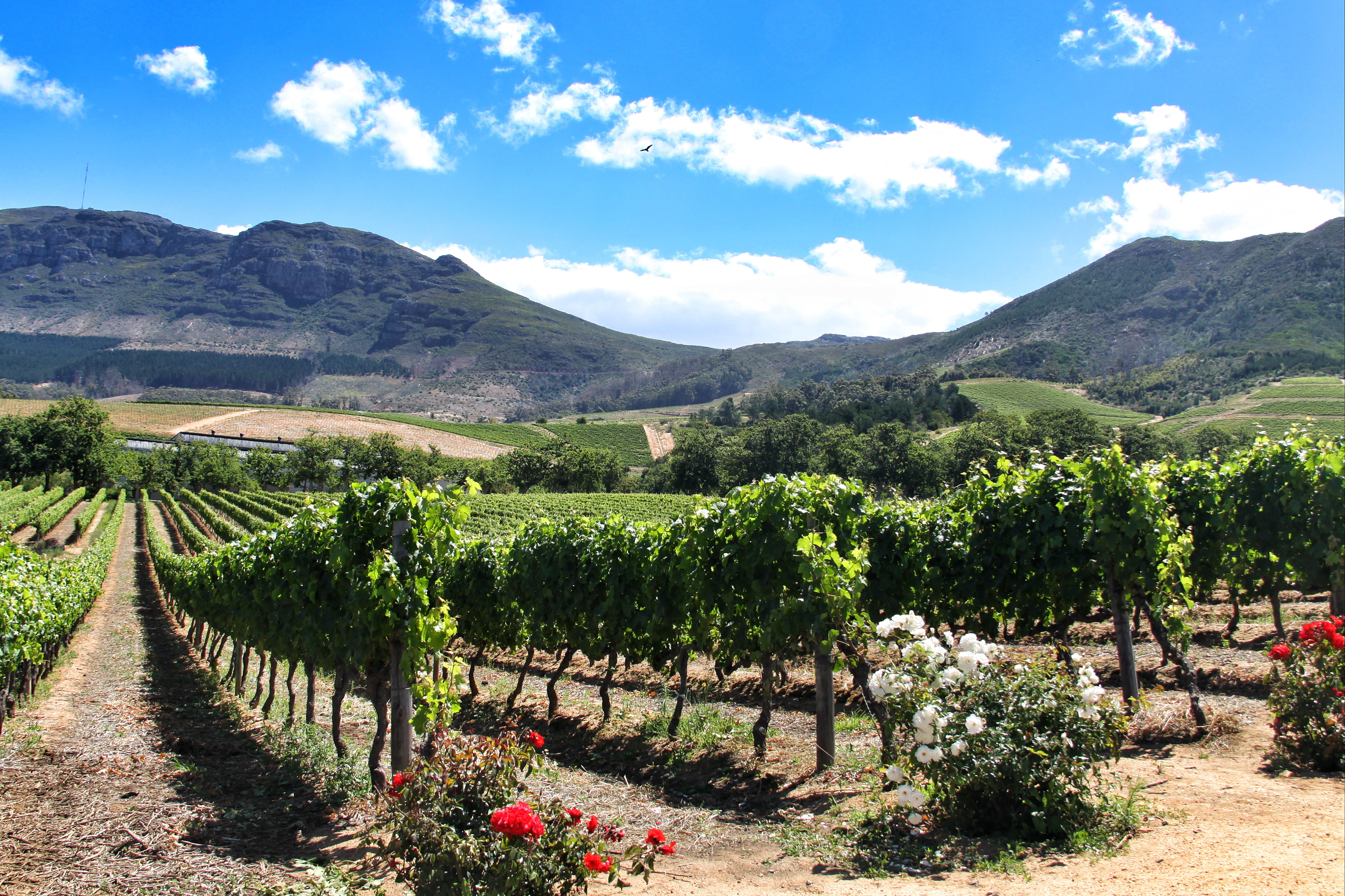
Groot Constantia, the oldest wine estate in South Africa

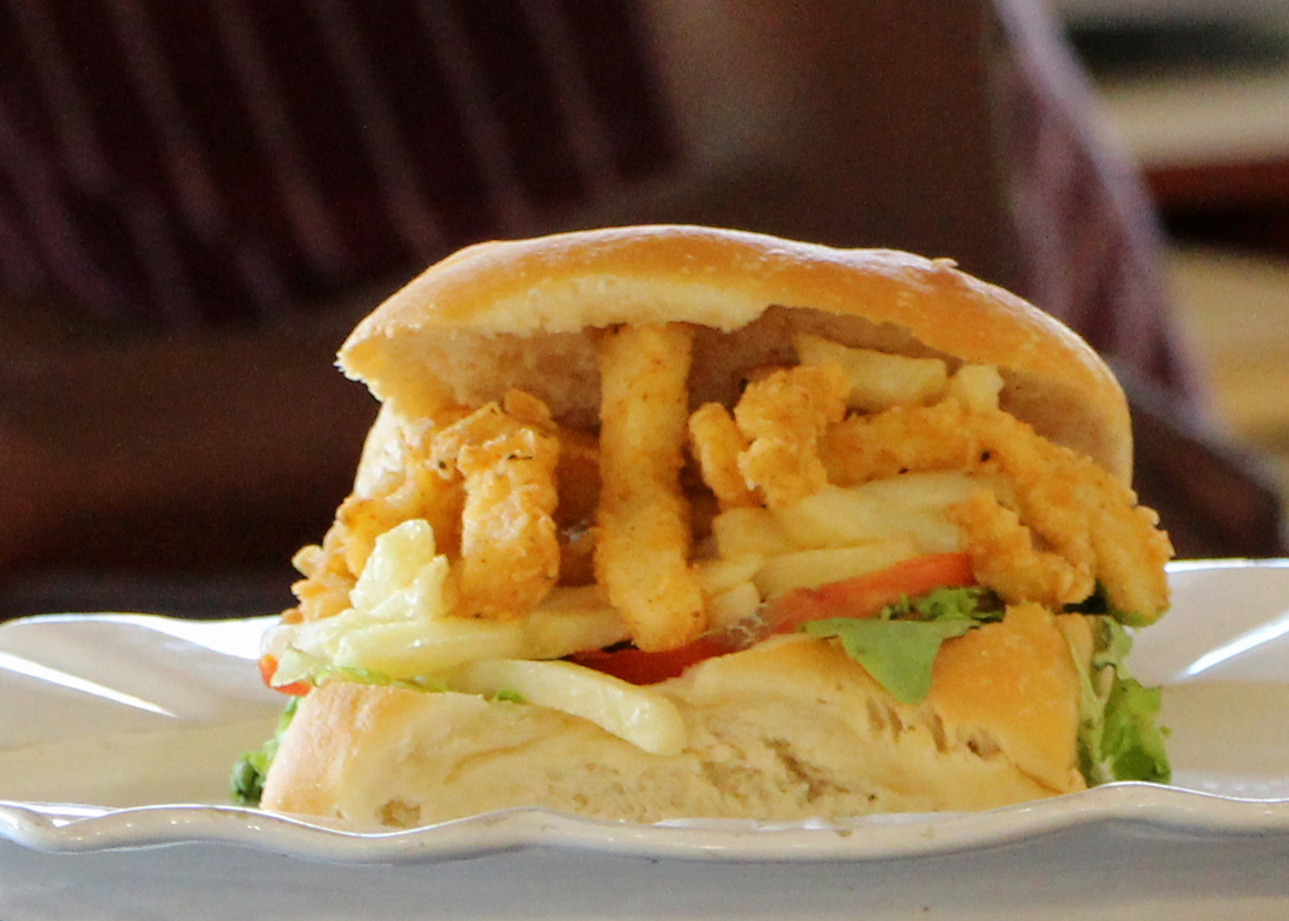
The Gatsby, a sandwich originated in the Cape Flats area of Cape Town

- Cape Town in art
- Public art in Cape Town
  - Statue of Nelson Mandela, Cape Town City Hall

=== Cuisine of Cape Town ===
- Cape Town wine
  - Constantia (wine)
- Gatsby (sandwich)

=== Events of Cape Town ===
- Cape Town Book Fair
- South African International Exhibition

Festivals

- Kaapse Klopse

=== Languages of Cape Town ===
- Afrikaans
- South African English
- Xhosa

=== Media of Cape Town ===
- Newspapers
  - Cape Times
  - The Cape Messenger
- Radio and television
  - CapeTalk
  - Cape Town TV
  - Fine Music Radio

=== People from Cape Town ===
- Zach de Beer
- J. M. Coetzee
- Derek Hanekom

=== Religion in Cape Town ===
- Anglican Diocese of Cape Town
- Roman Catholic Archdiocese of Cape Town

=== Sports in Cape Town ===
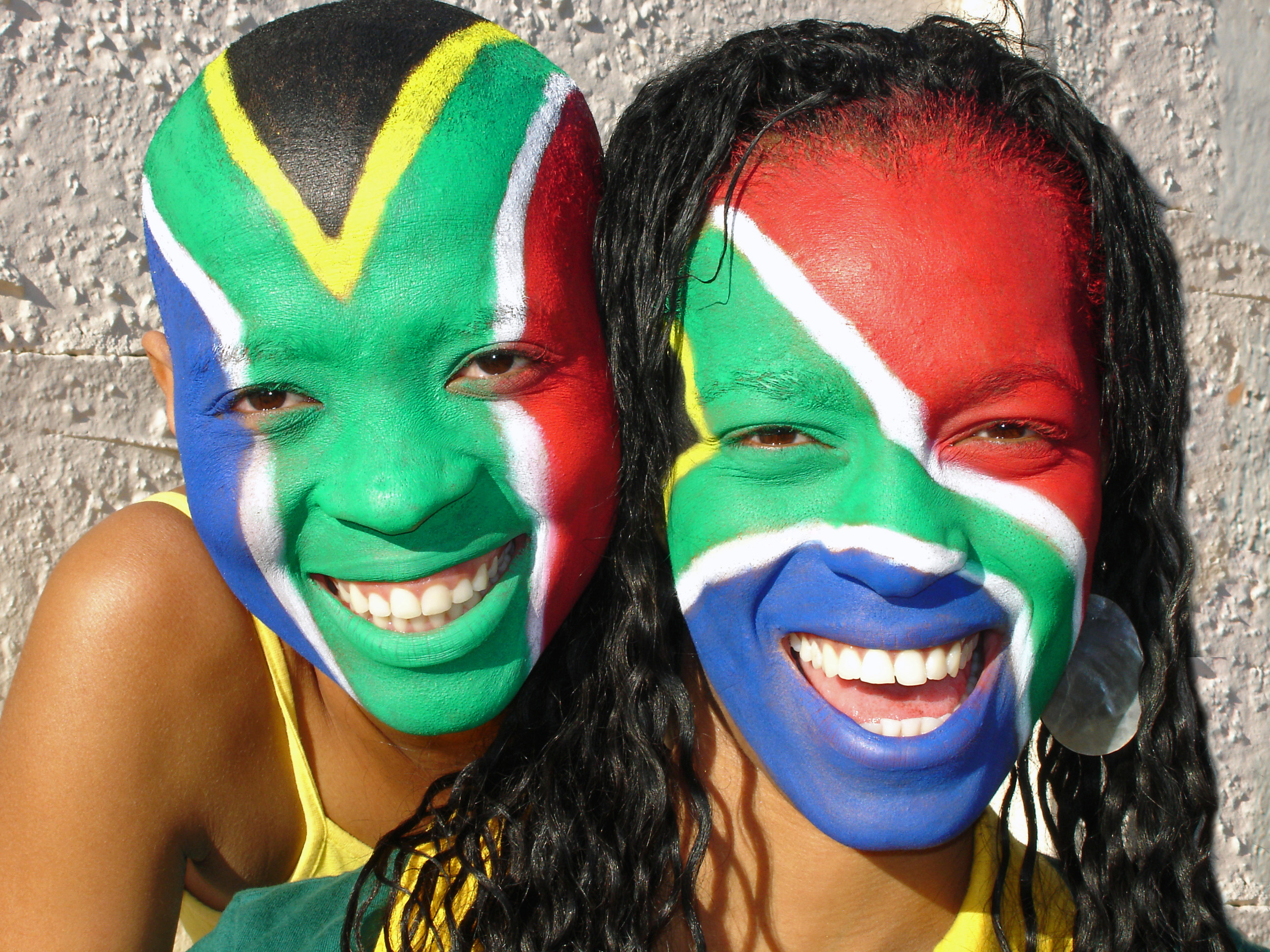
2010 FIFA World Cup fans

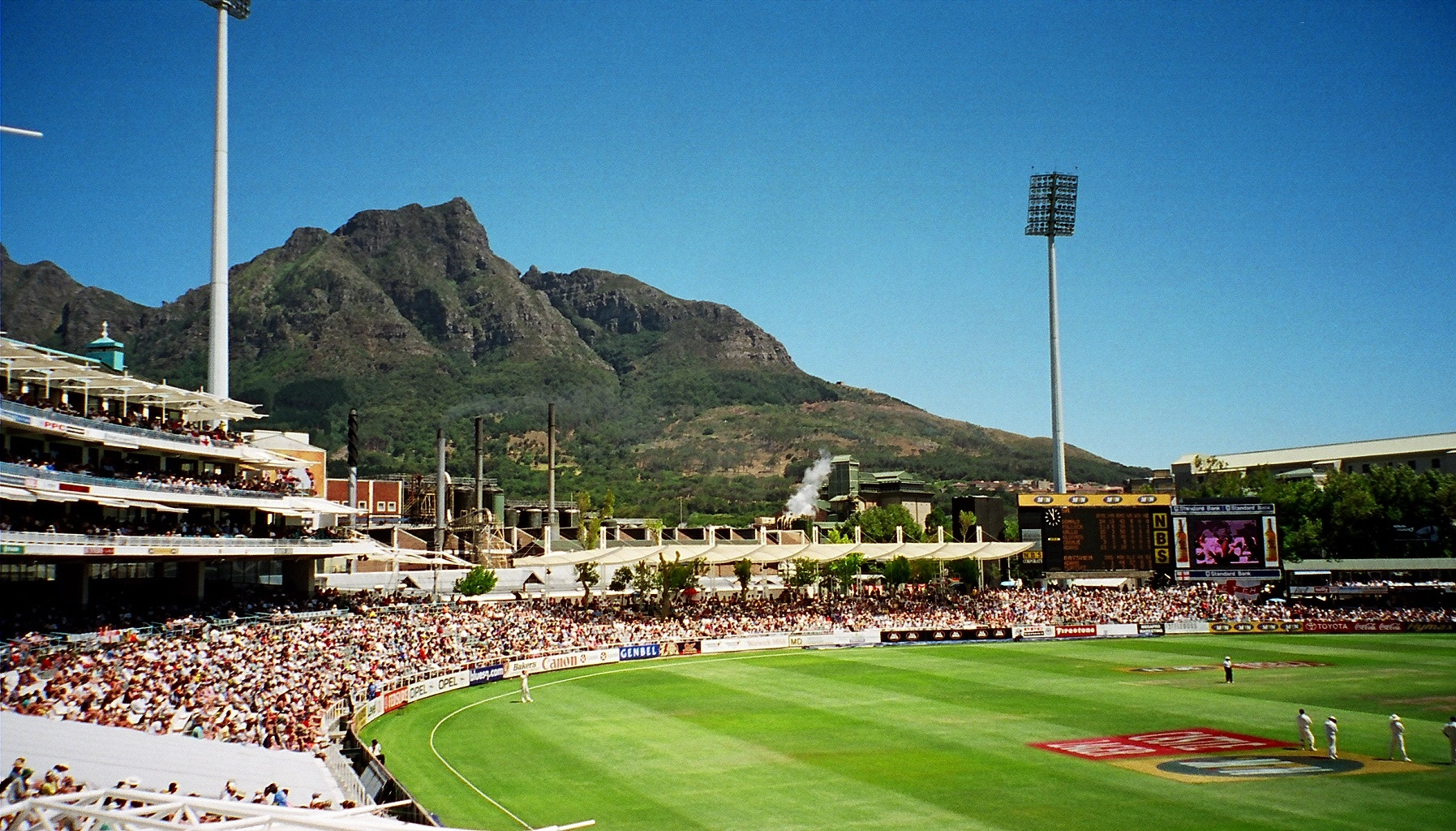
The Newlands Cricket Ground

Cape Town Stadium

Sports in Cape Town

- Football
  - Association football
    - Ajax Cape Town F.C.
    - Cape Town City F.C.)
    - Cape Town All Stars
  - Rugby football
    - Western Province
- Cricket in Cape Town
  - Cape Cobras
- Sports events in Cape Town
  - 2010 FIFA World Cup
  - Cape Town Cycle Tour
  - Cape Town Open
  - Cape Town Marathon
  - Two Oceans Marathon
- Sports venues in Cape Town
  - Cape Town Stadium
  - Green Point Stadium
  - Killarney Motor Racing Complex
  - Milnerton Racecourse
  - Newlands Cricket Ground
  - Newlands Stadium

== Economy and infrastructure of Cape Town ==
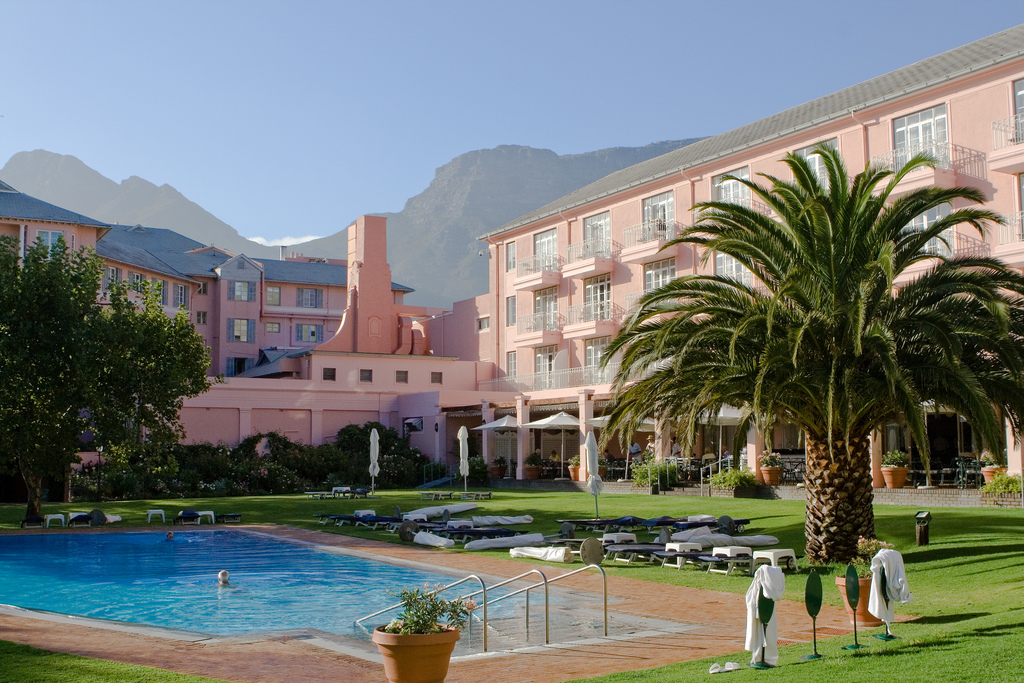
The Belmond Mount Nelson Hotel

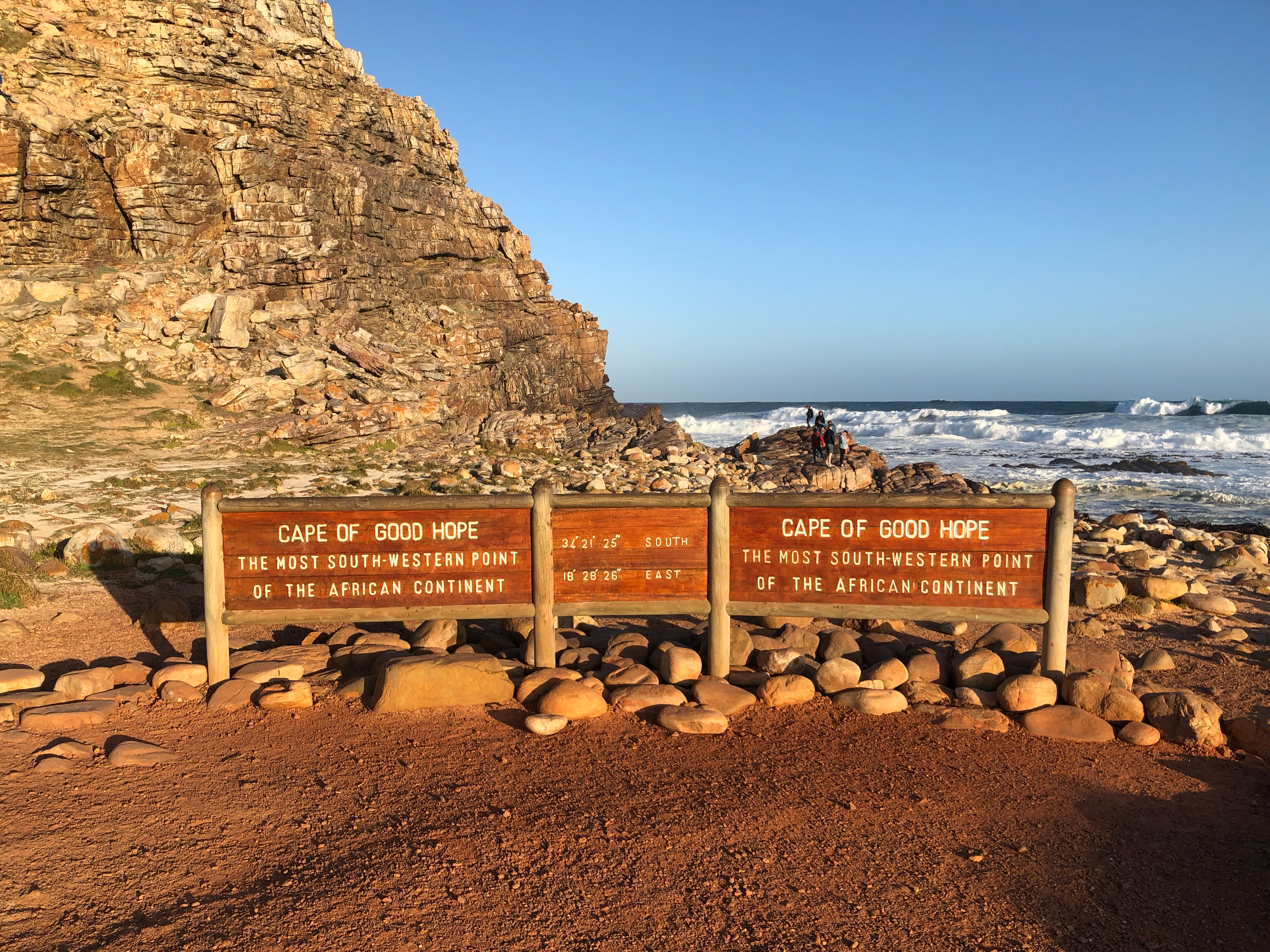
The Cape of Good Hope

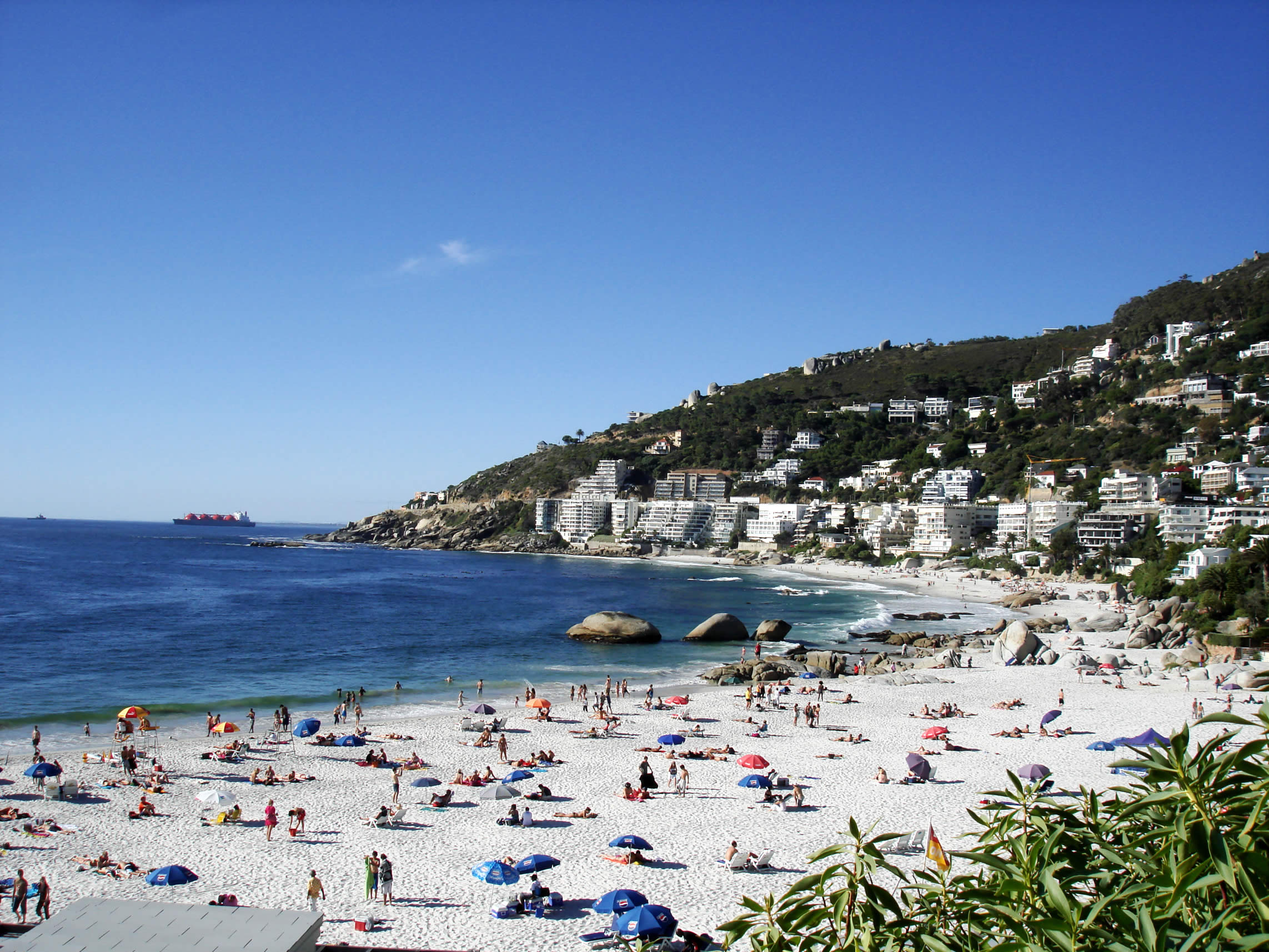
Tourism, an important sector in the Cape Town's economy

Economy of Cape Town

- Companies in Cape Town
  - Naspers
  - Travelstart
- Communications in Cape Town
  - MWEB
- Entrepreneurship and innovation
  - Silicon Cape Initiative
- Financial services in Cape Town
  - Sanlam
- Hotels and resorts in Cape Town
  - Belmond Mount Nelson Hotel
  - Protea Hotels by Marriott
- Restaurants and cafés in Cape Town
  - Café Caprice
  - Top of the Ritz (revolving restaurant)
- Shopping malls and markets in Cape Town
  - Canal Walk
  - Somerset Mall
- Tourism in Cape Town
  - Tourist attractions in Cape Town
    - Beaches of Cape Town
    - Cape of Good Hope
    - Groot Constantia
    - Nature reserves in Cape Town

=== Transportation in Cape Town ===
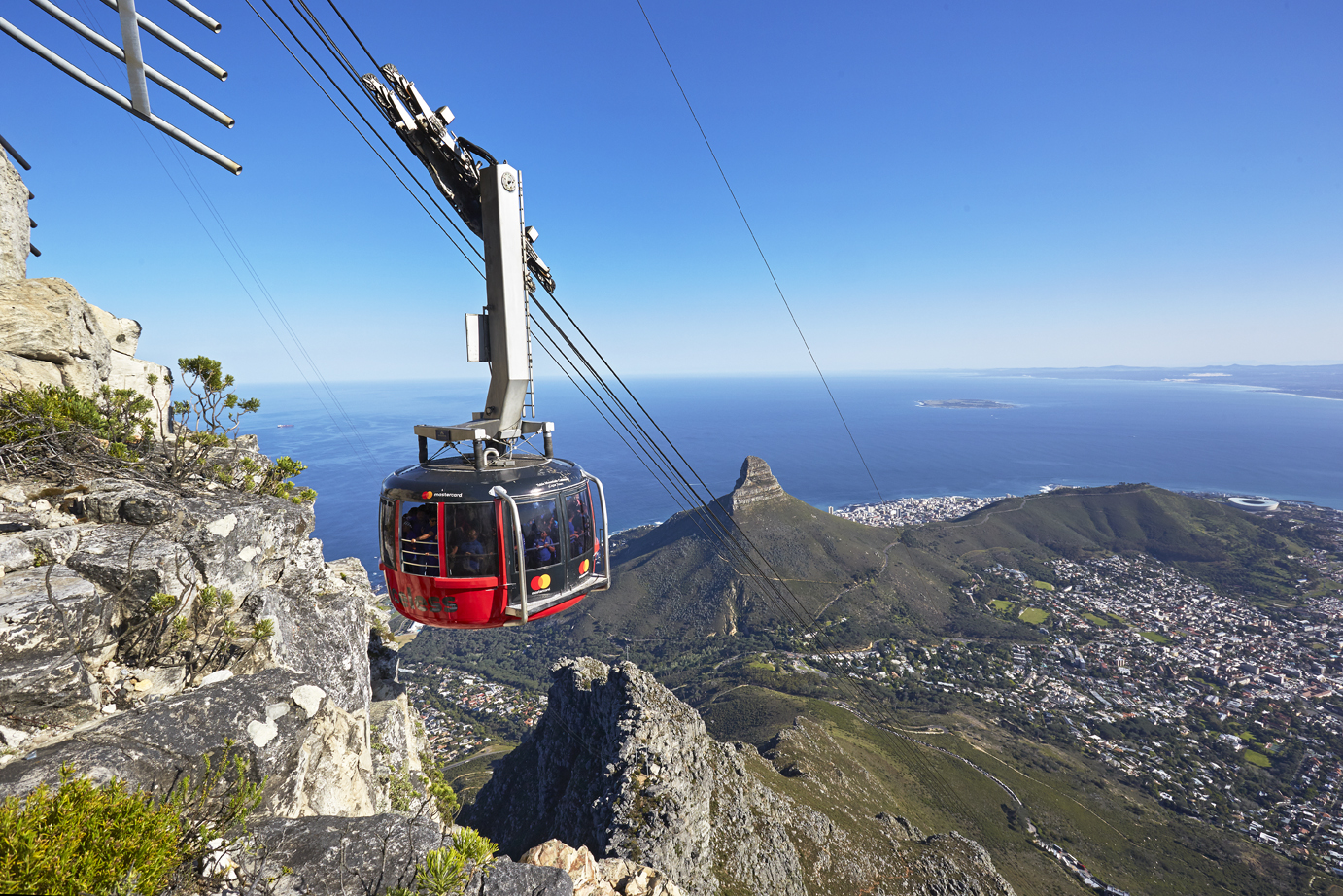
Table Mountain Aerial Cableway

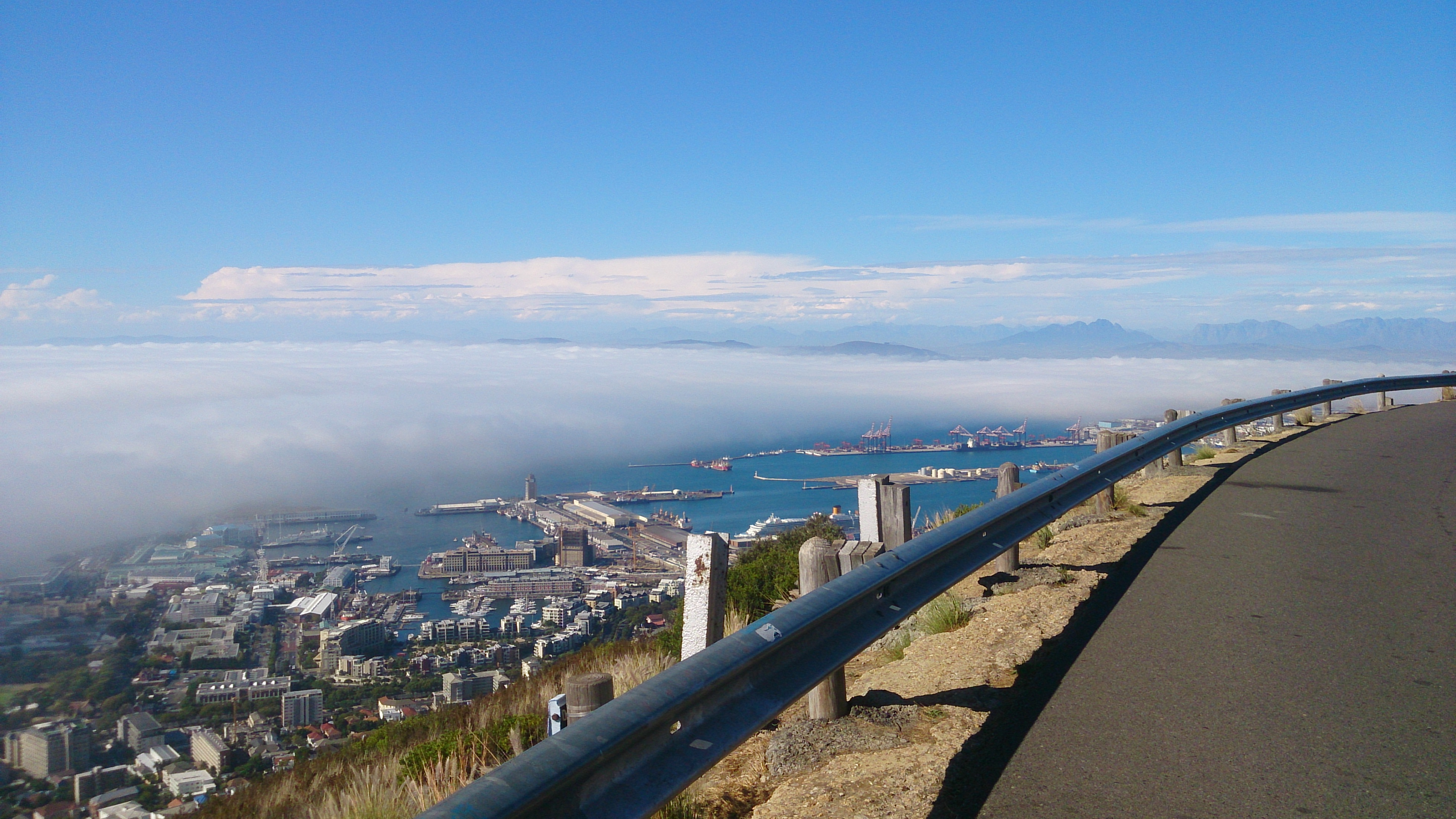
Port of Cape Town, as seen from Signal Hill

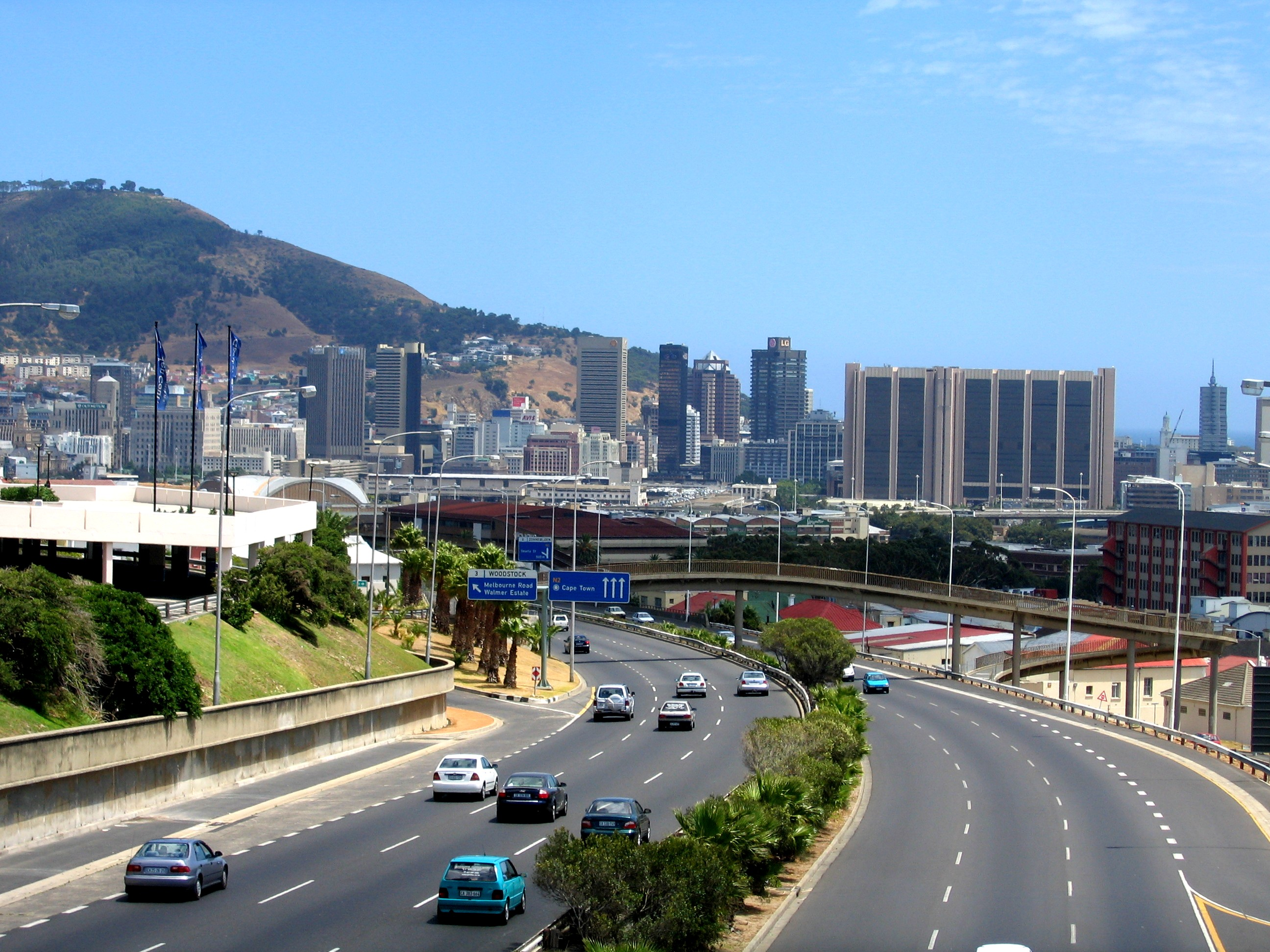
N2 highway, entering the City Bowl

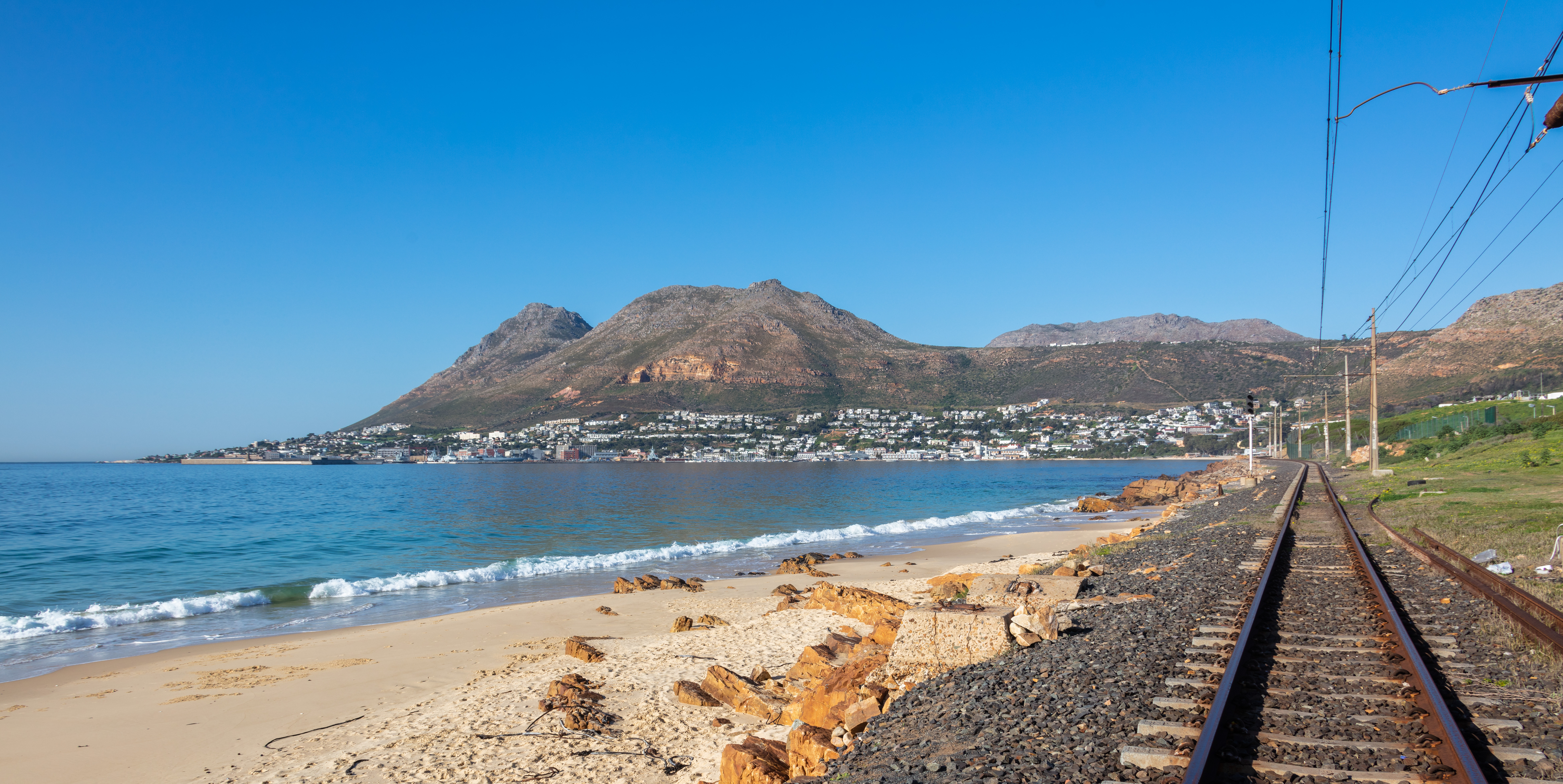
Southern Line railway as it approaches Simon's Town

Transport in Cape Town

- Air transport in Cape Town
  - Airports in Cape Town
    - Cape Town International Airport
- Cable transport in Cape Town
  - Table Mountain Aerial Cableway
- Maritime transport in Cape Town
  - Port of Cape Town
- Road transport in Cape Town
  - Buses in Cape Town
    - Golden Arrow Bus Services
    - MyCiTi
  - Roads in Cape Town
    - Peninsula Expressway
    - R300
  - Trolleybuses in Cape Town
    - Trolleybuses in Cape Town

==== Rail transport in Cape Town ====
Rail transport in Cape Town

- Blue Train
- Commuter rail lines
  - Metrorail Western Cape
    - Cape Flats Line
    - Central Line
    - Northern Line
    - Southern Line
- Railway stations in Cape Town
  - Cape Town railway station
- Trams in Cape Town

== Education in Cape Town ==
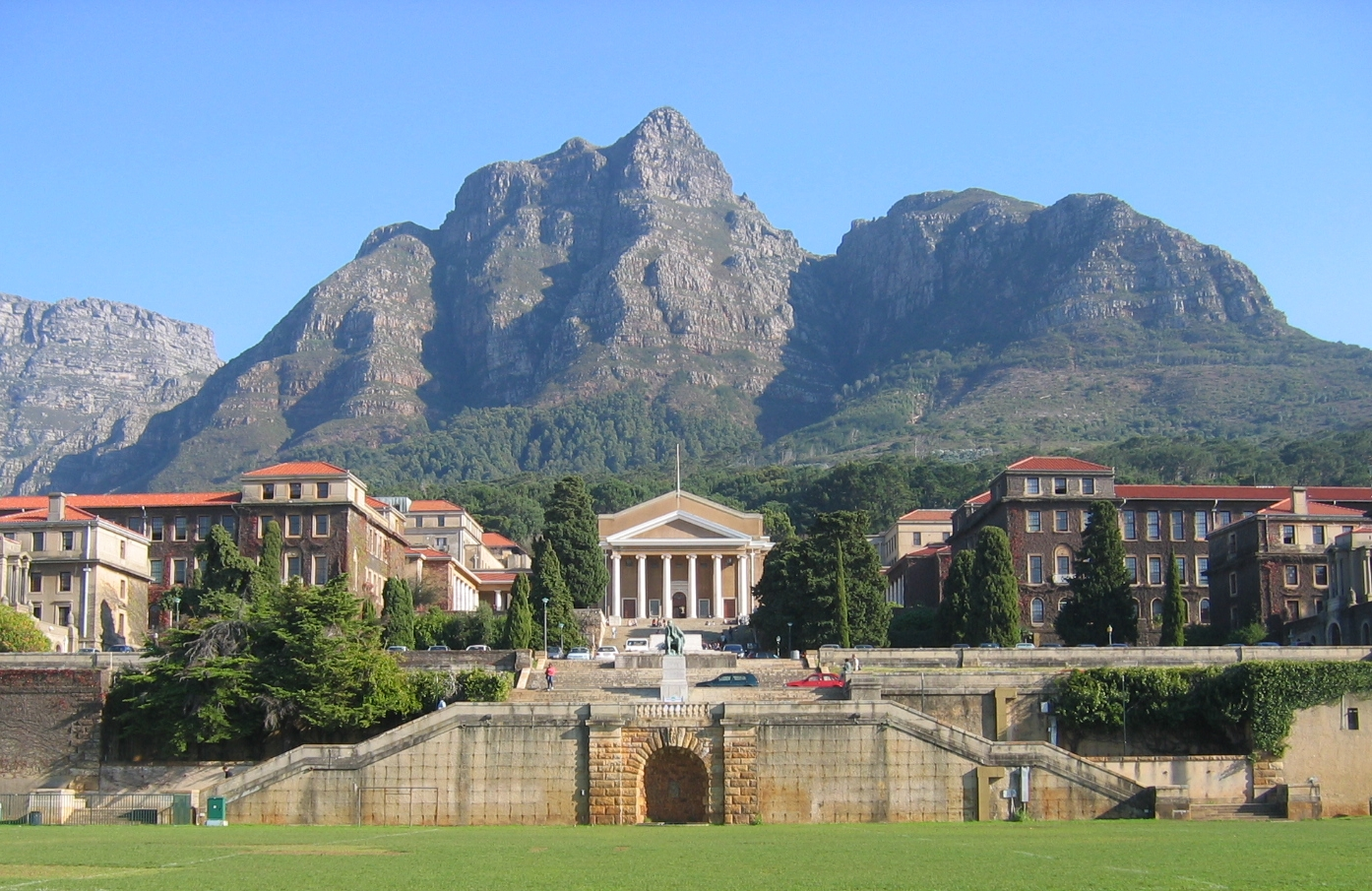
University of Cape Town's main campus

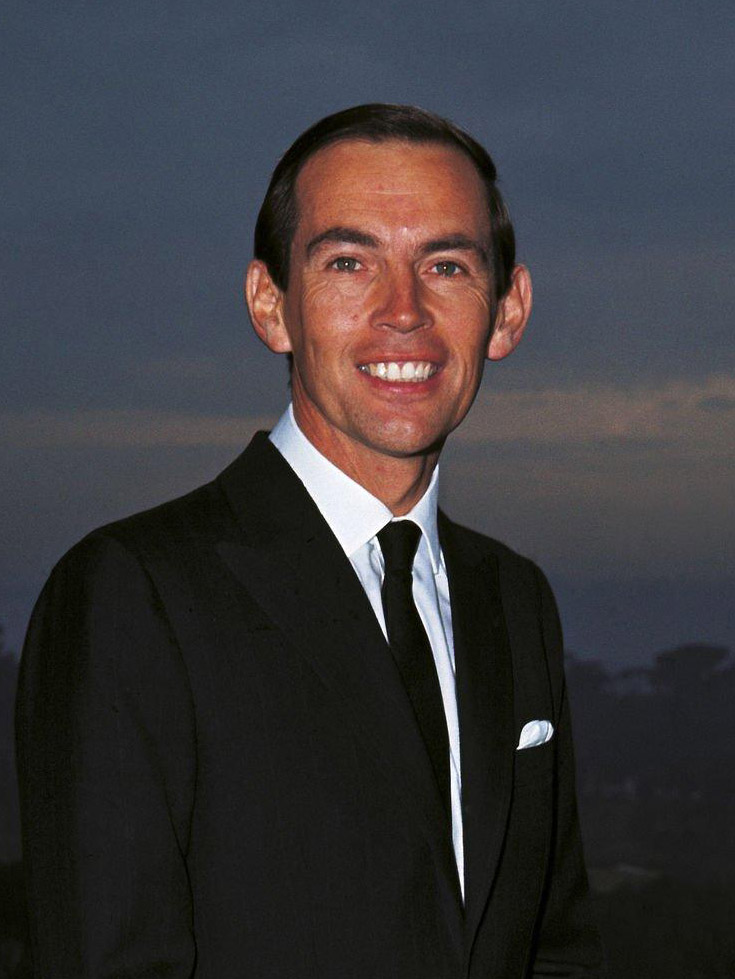
Christiaan Barnard, who performed the world's first human-to-human heart transplant on 3 December 1967 at Groote Schuur Hospital

Education in Cape Town

- Libraries in Cape Town
  - Central Library Cape Town
  - University of Cape Town Libraries
- Universities and colleges in Cape Town
  - Cape Peninsula University of Technology
  - University of Cape Town
  - University of the Western Cape
- Schools in Cape Town
  - Cape Town High School

== Healthcare in Cape Town ==
Healthcare in Cape Town

- Hospitals in Cape Town
  - Alexandra Hospital
  - Groote Schuur Hospital
  - Karl Bremer Hospital
  - Red Cross War Memorial Children's Hospital
  - Somerset Hospital
  - Tygerberg Hospital
  - Valkenberg Hospital

== See also ==
- Outline of geography
