= St. James Church, Cape Town =

St James Church
- St James Church
- 34°07′11″S 18°27′24″E
- Location: Main Rd, St James, Cape Town, 7946
- Country: South Africa
- Denomination: Catholic Church
- Website: saintjames.co.za

History
- Status: Church

Architecture
- Functional status: Active
- Completed: c. 1900

Administration
- Archdiocese: Cape Town

Clergy
- Archbishop: Stephen Brislin

The St. James Church is a Roman Catholic parish and church, located in St James, Cape Town, South Africa. The large church building was built in c. 1900.
