= List of sports events in Cape Town =

Cape Town in South Africa has had a long history of hosting major sporting events.

Year	Event	Venue
Annual (since 1960)	Berg River Canoe Marathon	Berg River, Paarl
Annual (since 1970)	Two Oceans Marathon	Start: Newlands, Finish: University of Cape Town
Annual (since 1978)	Cape Argus Pick 'n Pay Cycle Tour	Start: City Centre, Finish: Green Point Stadium
Annual (since 2004)	Absa Cape Epic	Various routes around Cape Town and the Western Cape
1995	IRB Rugby World Cup	Newlands Stadium (50,000), Danie Craven Stadium (20,000)
1996	24th IAAF World Cross Country Championships	Stellenbosch
1996	Atlanta 1996 Olympic Hockey qualifying tournament	Hartleyvale Hockey Stadium (3,000)
1996	Modern Pentathlon World Cup Final	Stellenbosch
1997	FIE World Championships in Fencing	Culemborg exhibition centre(6,000)
1997	UCI Mountain Bike World Cup	Stellenbosch
1997	World Junior Weightlifting Championships	Good Hope Centre (6,000)
1998	ISAF World Junior Sailing Championships	Simon's Town Harbour
2001	World Junior Weightlifting Championships	N/A
2002	2002 IIHF World Championship Division II Grp A (Ice Hockey)	The Ice Station - Grand West Casino
2003	ICC Cricket World Cup	Newlands Cricket Ground (25,000)
2003	UCI Track Cycling World Cup Classics Round 3	Bellville Velodrome
2003	World Road Championships	Various
2003	World Marathon Canoeing Championships	Berg River
2003	World Mountain Bike Championships	N/A
2004-2006	Swatch FIVB World Tour	Camps Bay Beach
2004-2010	Volvo Ocean Race	Cape Town Harbour, V&A Waterfront and Royal Cape Yacht Club
2006	8th African Gymnastics Championships	Bellville Velodrome
2007	UCI B World Cycling Championships	Bellville Velodrome (track)
2007	ICC World Twenty20 Championship	Newlands Cricket Ground (25,000)
2007	ITTF World Cadet Challenge and World Junior Circuit Finals	Good Hope Centre
2008	UCI World Junior Cycling Championships	Bellville Velodrome
2008	World Rope Skipping Championships	Good Hope Centre (6,000)
2008	2008 Biathle World Championships	Run: N/A Swim: N/A
2009	2009 Women's Hockey Champions Challenge	Hartleyvale Hockey Stadium (3,000)
2009	2009 Indian Premier League	Newlands Cricket Ground (25,000)
2010	2010 FIFA World Cup	Cape Town Stadium (68,000)
2010	African Karate Championships	Bellville Velodrome
2011	9th World Junior Women's Softball Championships	Turfhall Softball Stadium (2,500)
2011	Heineken Cape to Rio (Sailing)	Table Bay Harbour
2011	World Junior Judo Championships	CTICC
2011	2011 IIHF World Championship Division III (Ice Hockey)	The Ice Station - Grand West Casino
2012	ITTF World Junior Table Tennis Championships	Grand Arena (6,000)
	2012 World University Netball Championship	Good Hope Centre
2013	World Gym for Life	CTICC
	2013 IIHF World Championship Division III (Ice Hockey)	The Ice Station - Grand West Casino
	2013 Women's Hockey Investec Cup (Field hockey)	Hartleyvale Hockey Stadium (3,000)
