= Vredehoek Shul =

Former Orthodox synagogue in Cape Town, South Africa

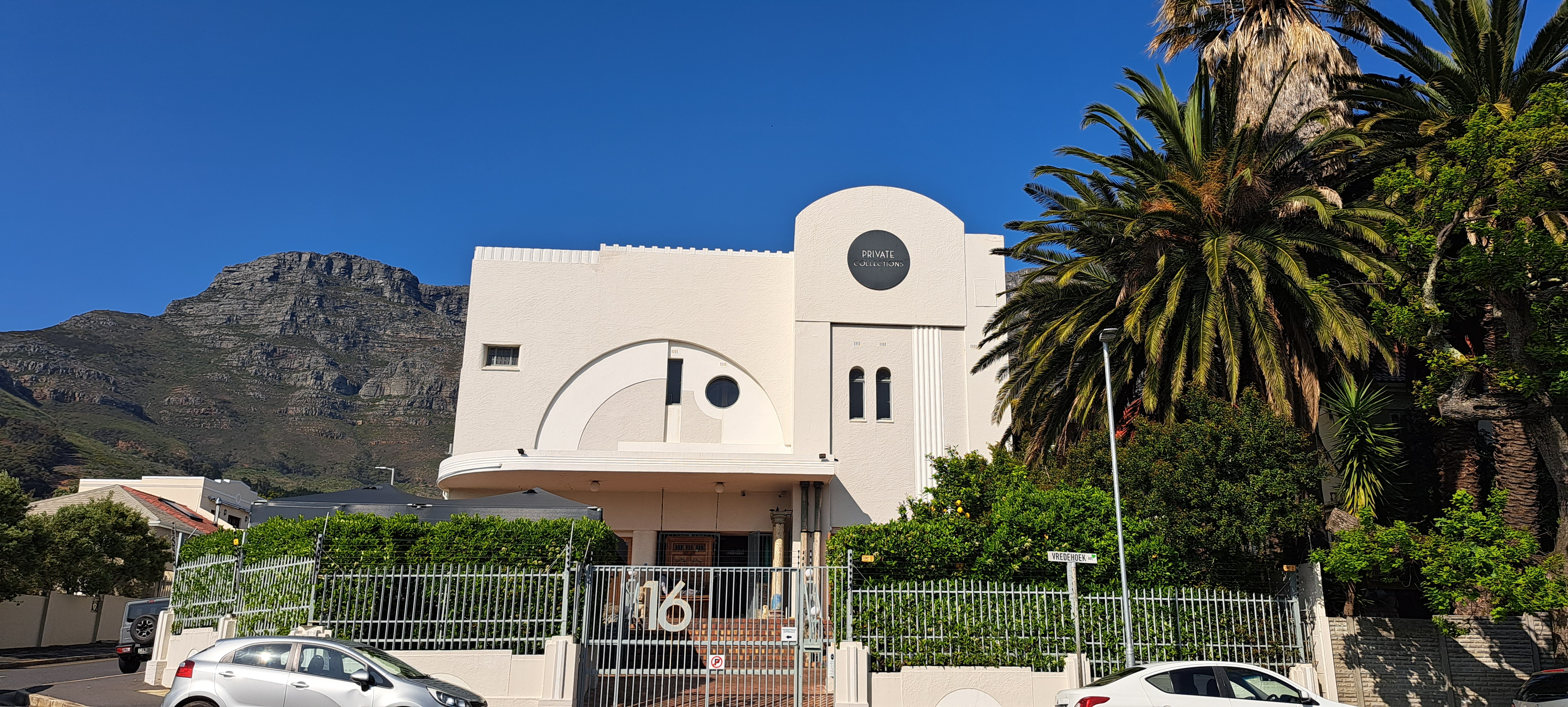
- The former synagogue in 2023

- Location of the former synagogue in Greater Cape Town

Religion
- Affiliation: Modern Orthodox Judaism (former)
- Rite: Nusach Ashkenaz
- Ecclesiastical or organisational status: Synagogue (1939–1993); Profane use (since c. 1993)
- Ownership: Cape Town Hebrew Congregation
- Status: Closed

Location
- Location: 16 Vredehoek Ave, Vredehoek, Cape Town
- Country: South Africa
- Coordinates: 33°56′13″S 18°25′09″E

Architecture
- Architect: John Joseph Ingber
- Type: Synagogue architecture
- Style: Art Deco
- Completed: 1939

The Vredehoek Shul, formally the Cape Town Hebrew Congregation, was a Modern Orthodox Jewish congregation and synagogue, located in Vredehoek in Cape Town, South Africa. The synagogue was completed in 1939 and closed in 1993. The Art Deco-style building is a protected South African Heritage Resources Agency site and currently operates as Private Collection, an antique furniture showroom.

The Vredehoek Shul was one of a number of synagogues in the City Bowl, along with the country's oldest synagogue, the Gardens Shul in Gardens.

== History ==
During the first half of the twentieth century, many Jewish immigrants from Europe, especially Lithuania settled in Cape Town. Rabbi Moses Chaim Mirvish came from Lithuania in 1908 and was the first fully qualified rabbi in the Cape Colony, becoming minister of the Cape Town Orthodox Hebrew Congregation (Beth Hamedrach HaChodesh) on Constitution Street in District Six. A number of Jewish immigrants living in District Six began to buy and build homes in Vredehoek. As Mirvish' congregation moved, a decision was made to relocate and build a new Art Deco-style building designed by John Joseph Ingber in 1939. Mirvish also founded the Cape Beth Din. Mirvish died on the steps of the synagogue on 17 August 1946 after officiating at a wedding. Following his death, the Cape Town City Council renamed the street alongside the shul Rabbi Mirvish Avenue.

In 1951, its cantor, Jacob Lichterman assisted with a historic court hearing in Cape Town's Supreme Court. Jack Ryback requested an order declaring his wife and son dead. His family were last known to have been living in the Warsaw Ghetto in 1942.

"The description of the end of the ghetto was presented by Jacob Lichterman, who had himself lived in Warsaw until 1943 and who had witnessed the destruction by fire of the ghetto. In an affidavit presented by Mr. Ryback, Mr. Lichterman, cantor of the Vredehoek Synagogue, stated that during 1945 and 1946 he had assisted the Central Committee of Jews in Poland with the compilation of a list of the few survivors of the holocaust and that the name of Ryback had not appeared among the survivors. He added that he believed that the Rybacks had either died in the ghetto or had been removed earlier to be exterminated in a death camp."

— Jewish Telegraphic Agency, 1951.

The City Bowl was the hub of Jewish life, but in the second half of the twentieth century, many Jewish residents began to move to the Southern Suburbs and Sea Point.

== Other synagogue in Vredehoek ==
The other synagogue in Vredehoek was the Tifereth Israel Synagogue (Schoonder Street Shul), also known as the “round shul”. It was designed by architect Max Policansky and opened in 1952 and was demolished in 2001.

== Gallery ==
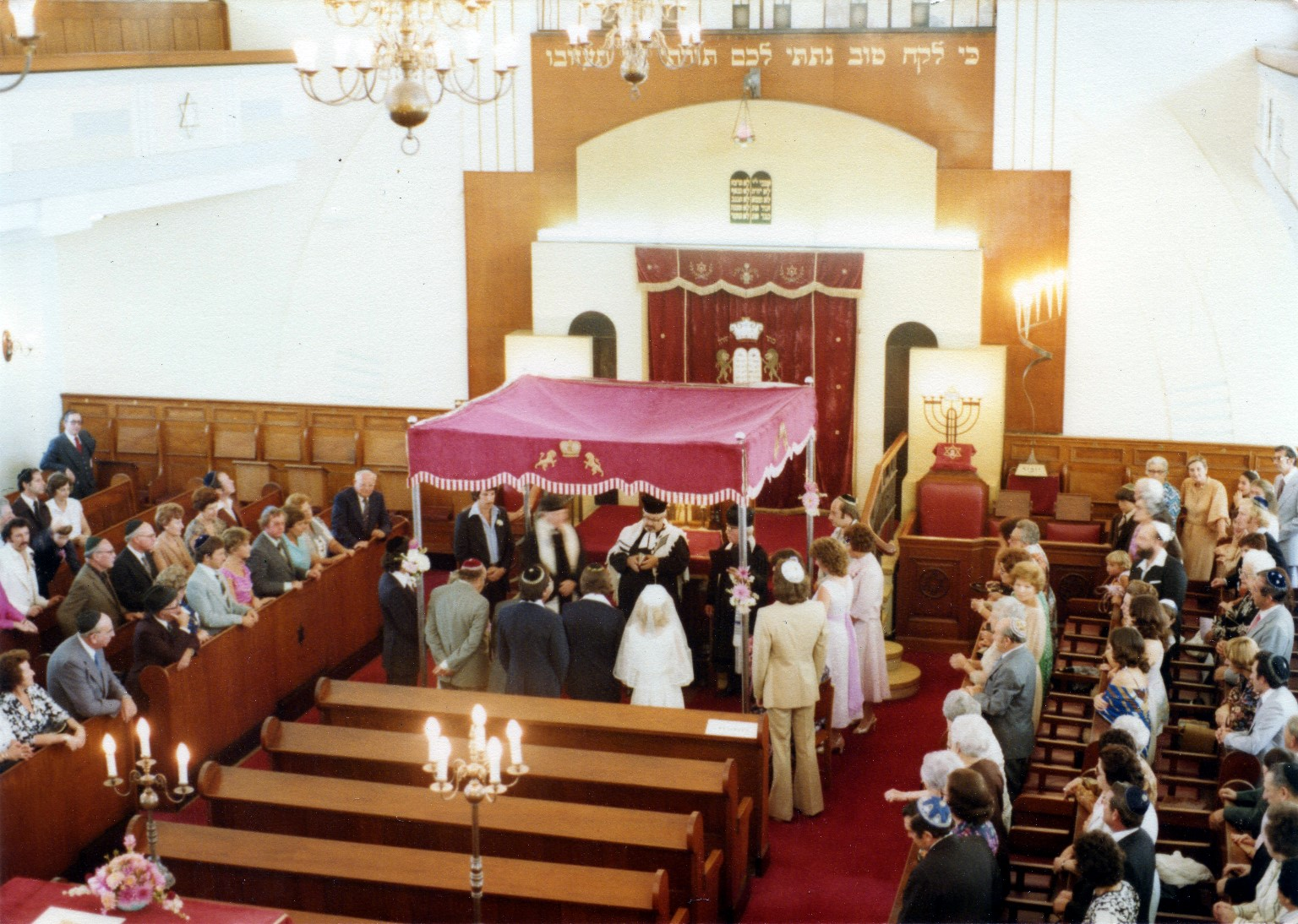
Wedding Chuppah at Vredehoek Shul, 1979

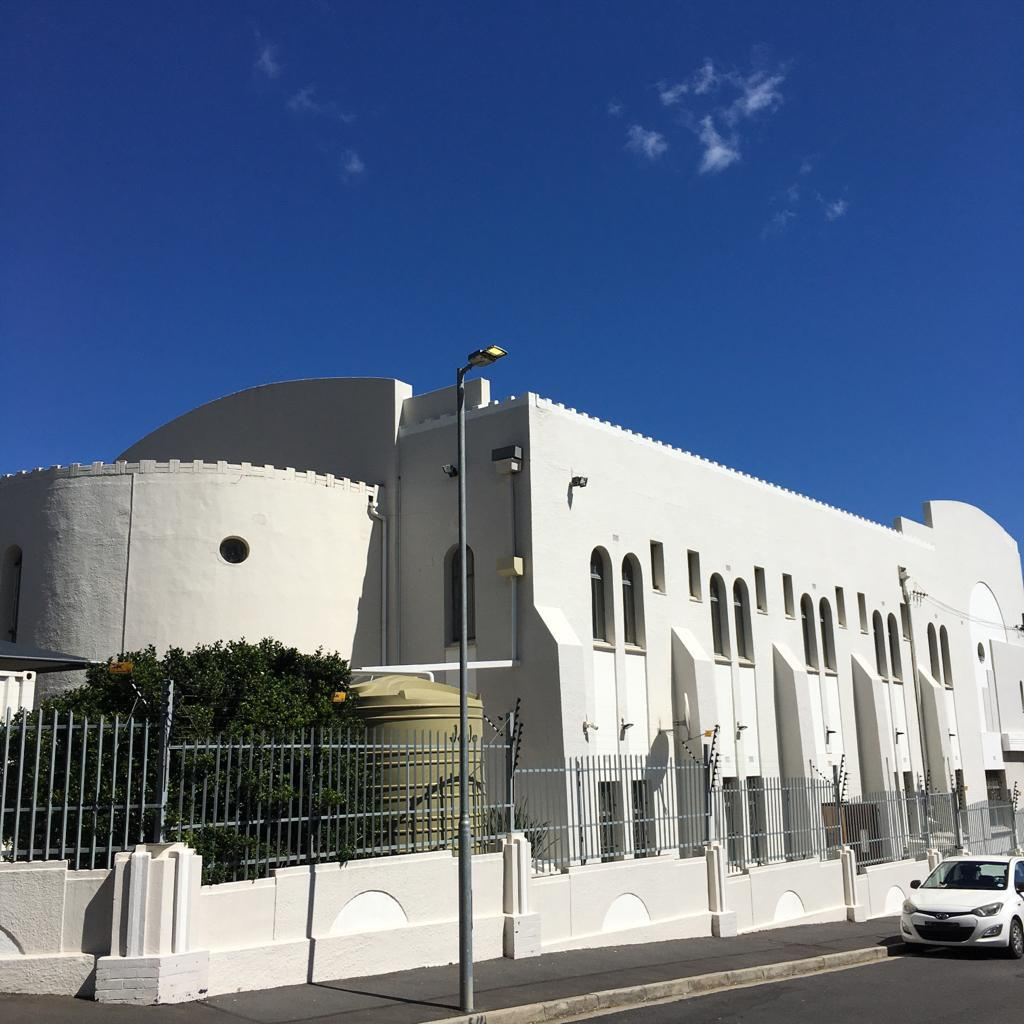
Rear view of former Vredehoek Shul, 2024

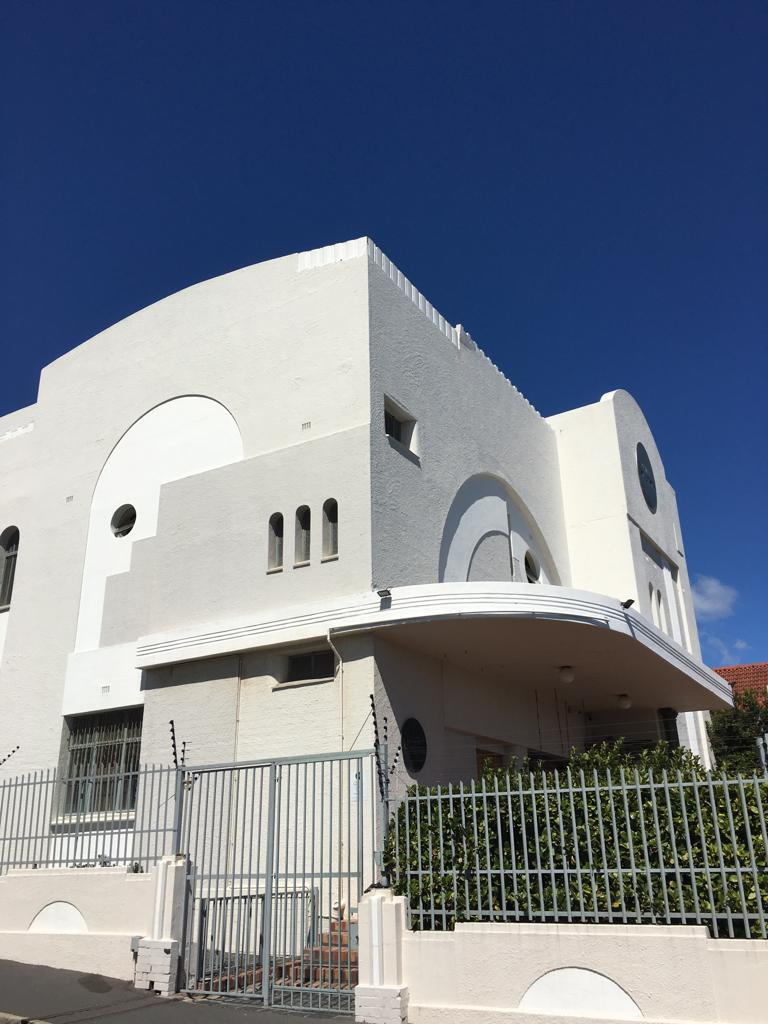
Front and side view of former vredehoek Shul, 2024

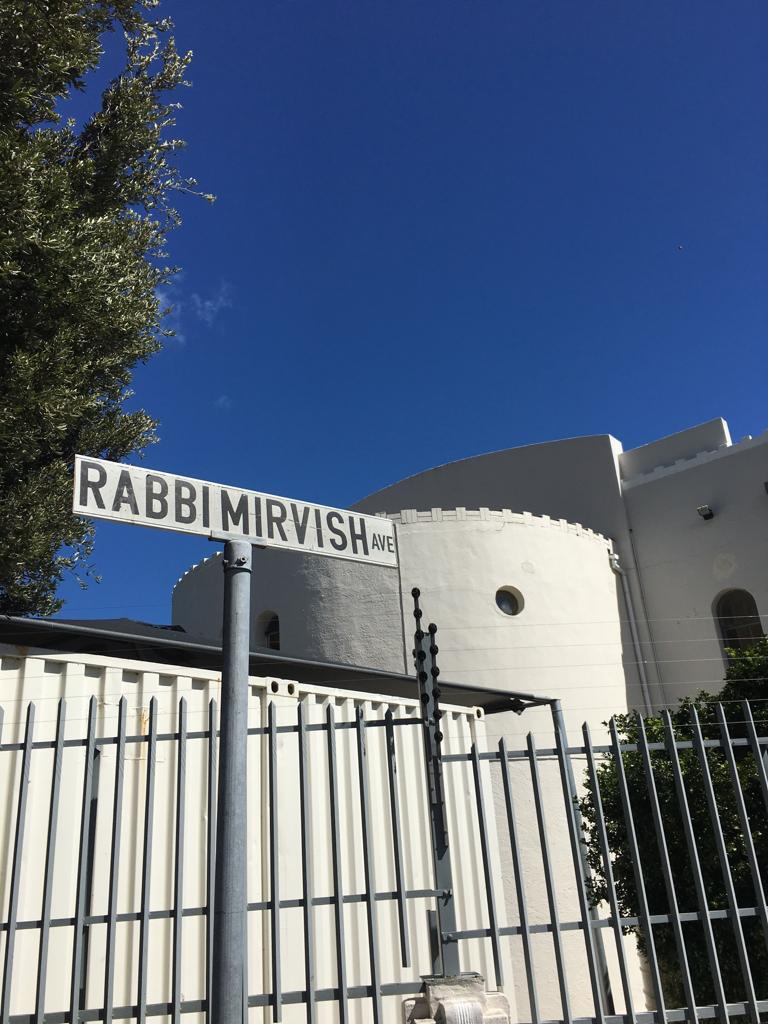
Rabbi Mirvish Avenue beside the synagogue, 2024

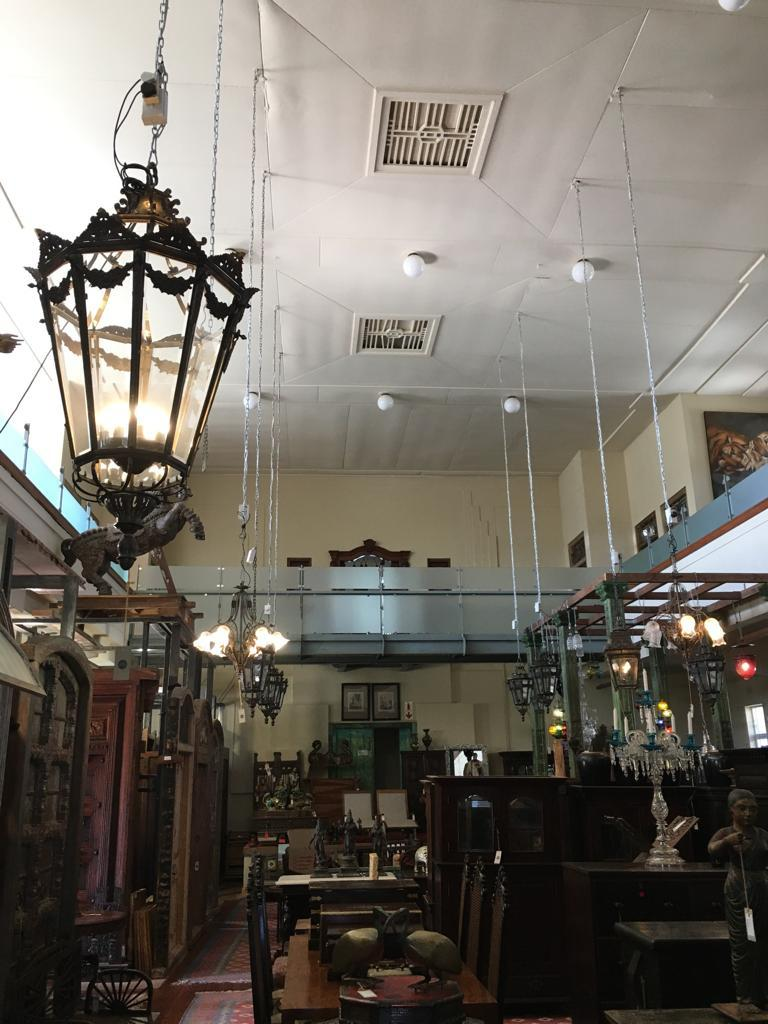
Interior, 2024

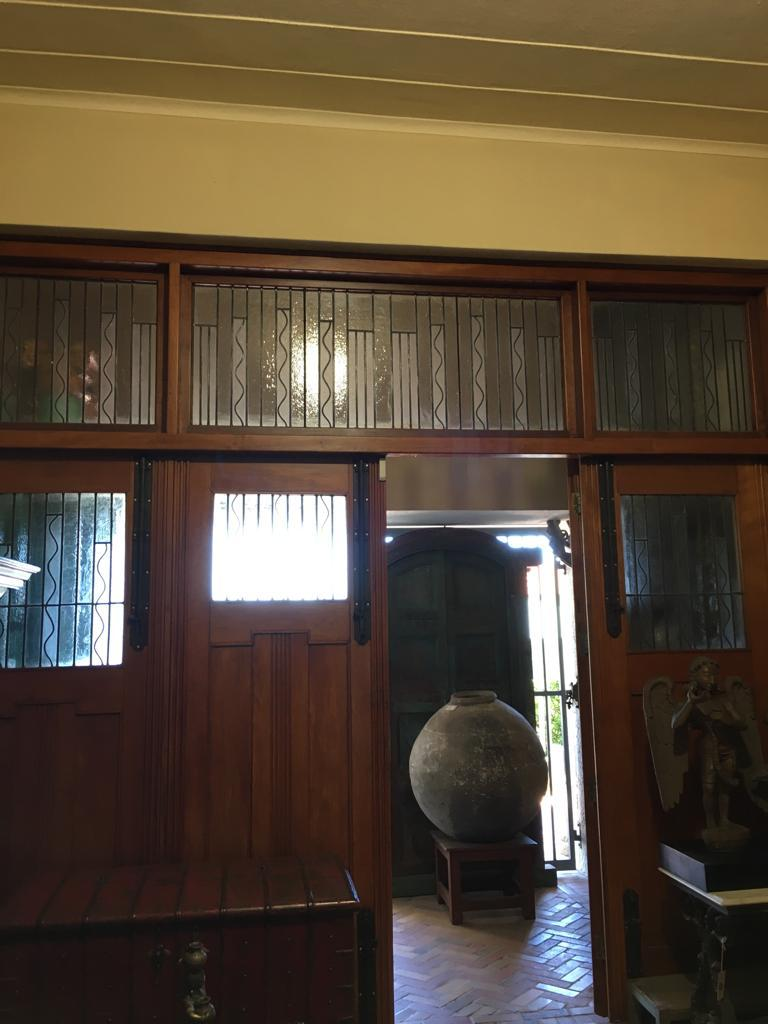
Vredehoek Shul doors, 2024

== See also ==
- History of the Jews in South Africa
- List of synagogues in South Africa
