= Jacob Landau =

Jacob Landau may refer to:

- Jacob Landau (1892-1952), Austrian-American publisher and mass media founder
- Jacob Landau (1917–2001), American artist
- Jacob Landau (1924-2020), Israeli academic
- Jacob Landau (1934–2008), American journalist
- Jacob ben Judah Landau (died 1493), German-Italian rabbi

== See also ==
- Jack Landau (disambiguation)
