= Jack Landau =

Jack Landau may refer to:

- Jack Landau (director) (1924–1966), American theatre director and designer
- Jack Landau (judge) (born 1953), justice of the Oregon Supreme Court
- Jacob Landau (journalist) (1934–2008), a.k.a. Jack Landau, American journalist

== See also ==
- Jacob Landau (disambiguation)
