= Mandela Rhodes Building =

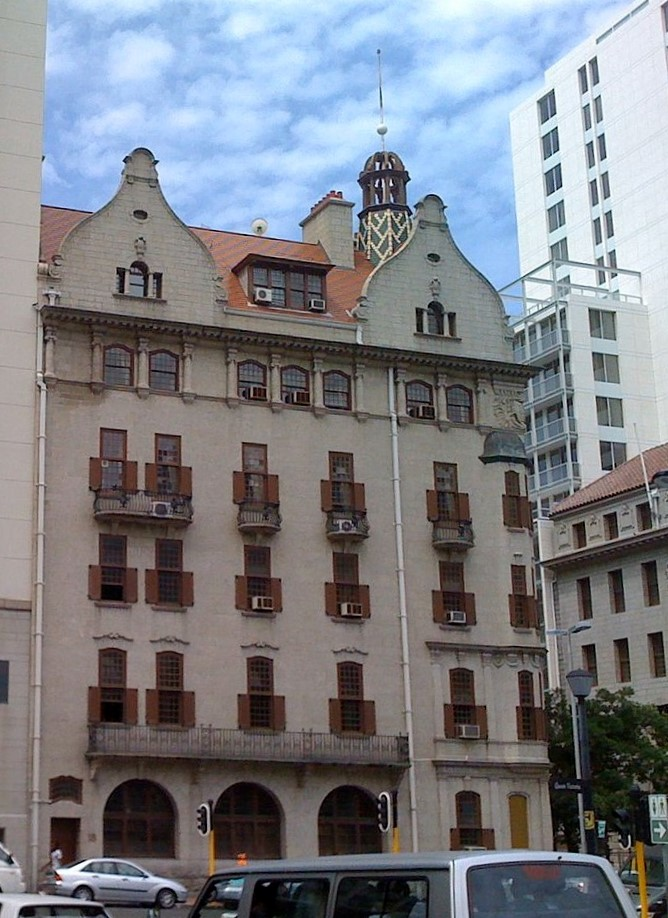
- Mandela Rhodes Building in Cape Town
- Click on the map for a fullscreen view

General information
- Location: Cape Town, South Africa
- Coordinates: 33°55′27.09″S 18°25′09.64″E

Design and construction
- Architect: Herbert Baker

The Mandela Rhodes Building is a Cape Dutch revival building situated in Cape Town, South Africa.

== History ==
The building, built in 1903, was designed by famous architect Herbert Baker to house the newly founded De Beers mining corporation. At this time, it was known as the Rhodes House after Cecil John Rhodes.

In 2003, it was gifted by Nicky Oppenheimer, De Beers chairperson, to the Mandela Rhodes Foundation, becoming the seat of its headquarters.

== Description ==
The building is located at the corner of St George's Mall and Wale Street in Cape Town's City Bowl.
