= Devil's Peak Estate =

Suburb of Cape Town, in Western Cape, South Africa

- Interactive map of Devil's Peak Estate
- Coordinates: 33.9368°S 18.4302°E
- Country: South Africa
- Province: Western Cape
- Municipality: City of Cape Town
- Main Place: Cape Town

Area
  - Total: 0.46 km^{2} (0.18 sq mi)

Population (2011)
  - Total: 1,859
  - Density: 4,000/km^{2} (10,000/sq mi)

Racial makeup (2011)
  - Black African: 8.5%
  - Coloured: 8.2%
  - Indian/Asian: 2.7%
  - White: 77.8%
  - Other: 2.7%

First languages (2011)
  - English: 72.2%
  - Afrikaans: 18.9%
  - Other: 8.9%
- Time zone: UTC+2 (SAST)
- Postal code (street): 8001

Devil's Peak Estate is a suburb of Cape Town, South Africa in the area known as the City Bowl. It is sandwiched between Vredehoek and Zonnebloem on the slopes of Devil's Peak. According to the 2011 census it has a population of 1,859 residents in an area of 0.46 square kilometres (0.18 sq mi).

Devil's Peak is situated adjacent to the M3 expressway (De Waal Drive changed to Philip Kgosana Drive). The name Devil's Peak is descriptive of its location as this is the closes suburb to the mountain peak of the same name. It is derived from a folklore story about a pipe smoking competition between a pirate named Jan van Hunks and the Devil. To this day when a cloud forms around the mountain people will say that "the Devil and van Hunks are at it again". Devil's Peak is known as one of the windiest places in the city bowl, often buffeted by the south-easterly Cape Doctor winds.

It is served by route 101 of the MyCiTi bus service.

Devil's Peak is a quiet neighbourhood often considered a sub-suburb of Vredehoek. It also falls under the neighbourhood watch community called DPV which stands for Devil's Peak & Vredehoek.

The area has access to the Table Mountain Reserve where the public has access to mountain trails. These are frequented by hikers and mountain bikers.

Every few years the area comes under threat of wildfires in which properties have been damaged. However a strong community program ensures that evacuation processes and destructive fires are kept under control.
