= Disa Park =

Housing development in Cape Town

Coordinates: 33°56′32″S 18°25′35″E

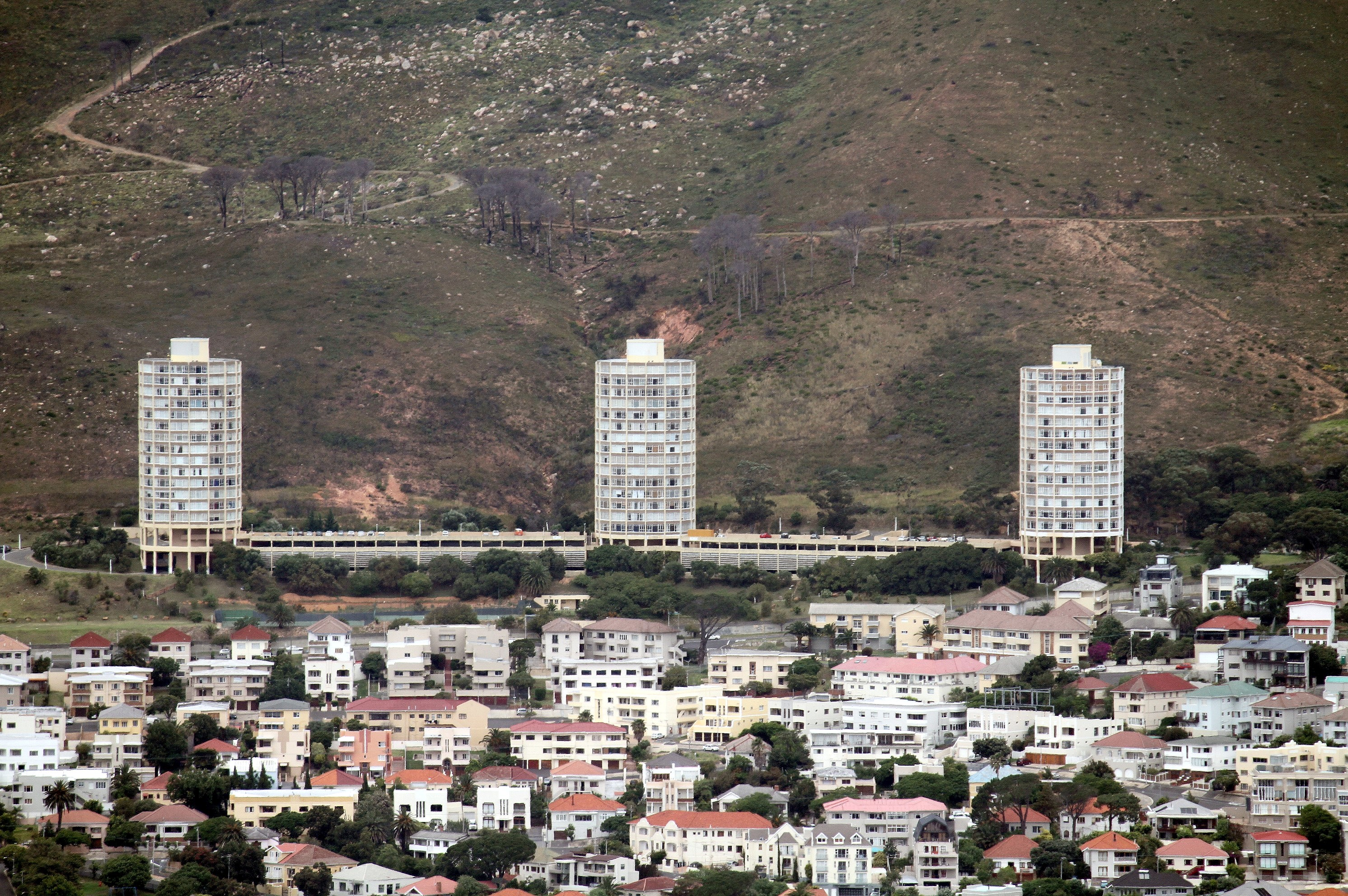
- The three towers of Disa Park viewed from Signal Hill
- Interactive map of the Disa Park area

General information
- Type: Apartment block
- Architectural style: Brutalist
- Location: , Vredehoek, Cape Town, South Africa
- Completed: 1969
- Cost: R3,000,000

Height
- Height: 54.8 m (180 ft)

Dimensions
- Diameter: 24.3 m (80 ft)

Design and construction
- Architecture firm: Bergamasco, Duncan & James
- Main contractor: Murray & Roberts

Disa Park is a series of towers in the Vredehoek area of Cape Town, South Africa. The towers were built in response to a "white housing crisis" in the city and completed in 1969. The buildings were designed by architectural firm Bergamasco, Duncan & James, which also designed most of the contemporary Catholic churches in Cape Town.

== Overview ==
Built by the construction company Murray & Roberts in the 1960s, these three 17 story, cylindrical towers, called Blinkwater, Platteklip and Silverstroom, are nestled on the slopes of Table Mountain. The three towers are disparagingly known to Capetonians as "The Pepper Pots", "Toilet Rolls" and "Tampon Towers". It has 259 residential units, providing enough housing for roughly 1,000 residents.

Murray & Roberts found a loophole in the building restrictions on the mountainside, and built the base below the allowable development line, then built upward, above the line.

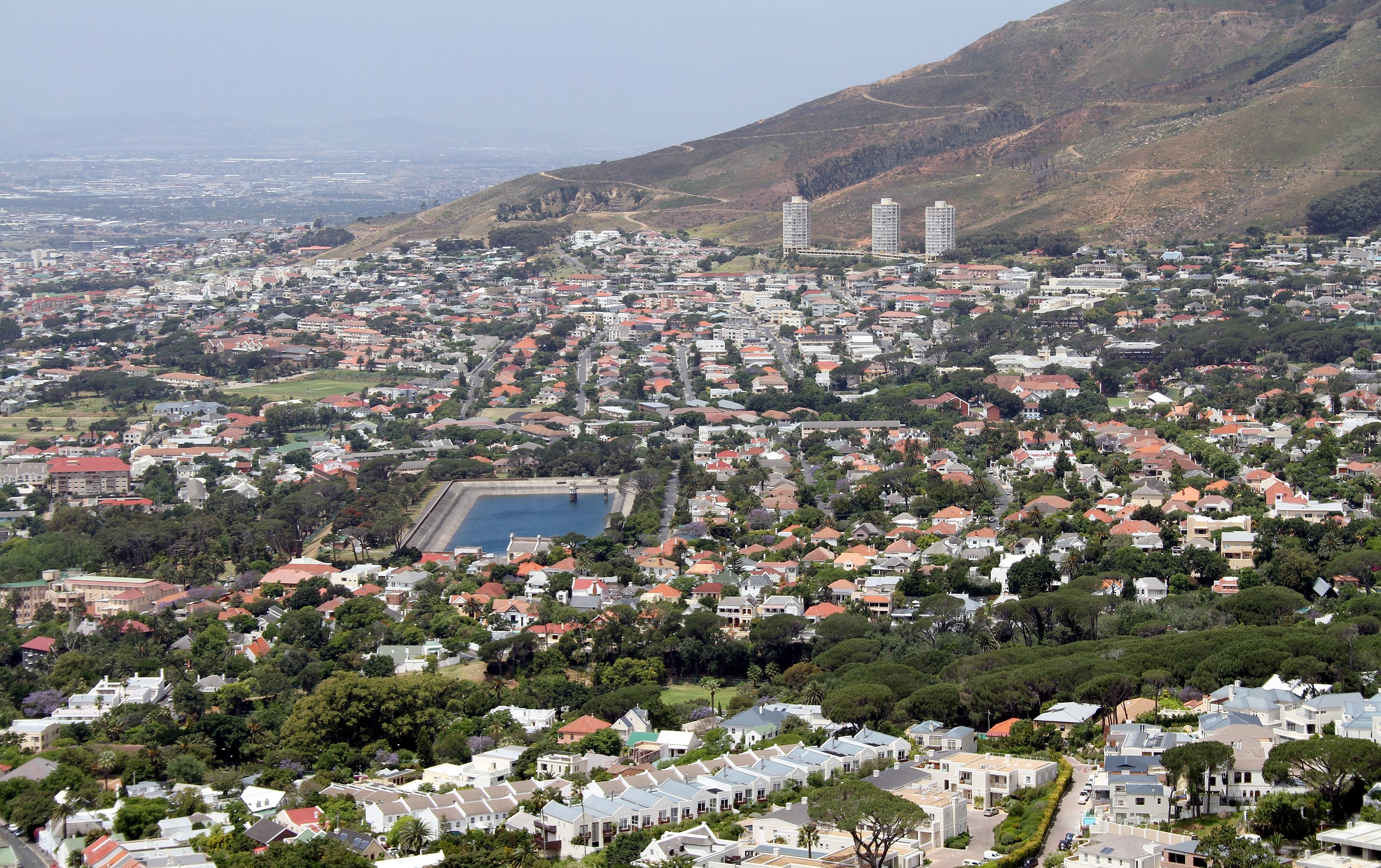
With the suburbs of Devil's Peak, Vredehoek, Oranjezicht and Higgovale in the foreground, the unrestricted view enjoyed by residents of Disa Park can be appreciated

The residents tend to disagree with the critics; their homes have access to dozens of trails and hikes on their doorstep as well as a tennis court, squash courts, a braai area and a swimming pool. The towers also provide an excellent vantage point for scenic views over the region, but they dominate views of Table Mountain from below.

== Gallery ==
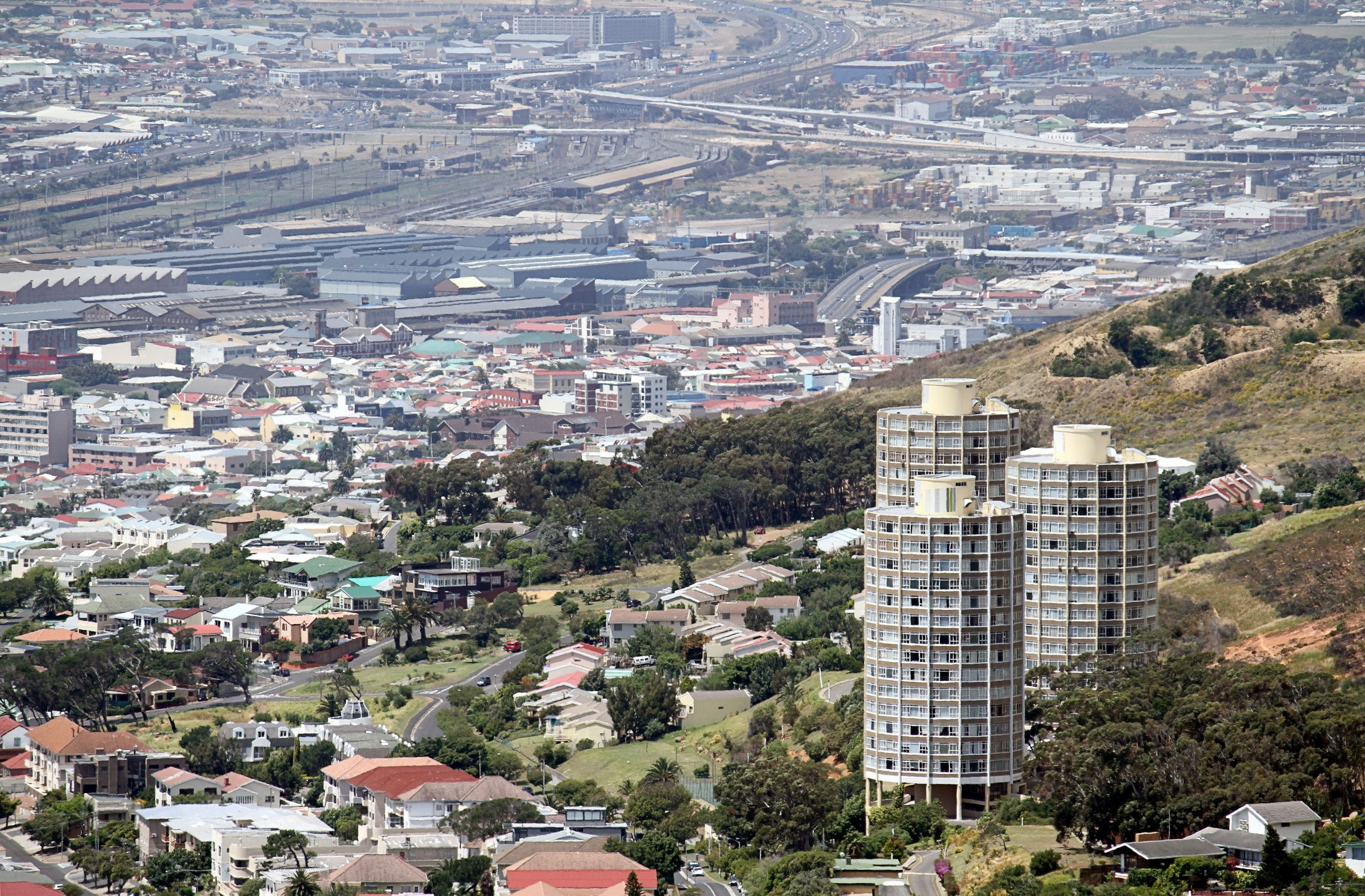
Disa Park with Salt River and Woodstock in the background.

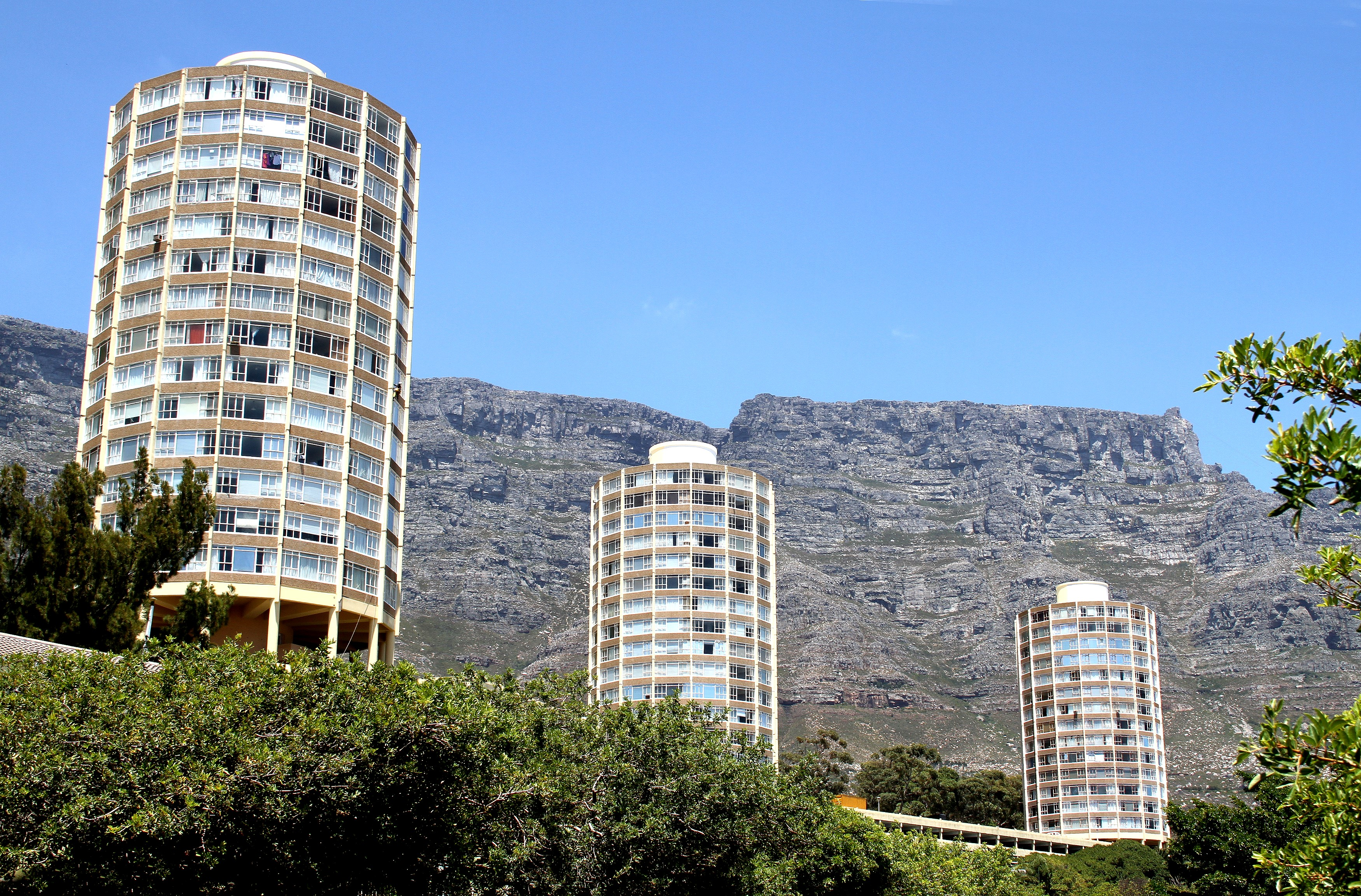
Disa Park viewed from Chelmsford Avenue, Vredehoek.

== See also ==
- Lion's Head
- Signal Hill
- Disa uniflora
