= Kveller =

Jewish parenting website

- Available in: English
- Headquarters: {{{location_country}}}
- Owner: 70 Faces Media
- Creator: Deborah Kolben
- Editor: Molly Tolsky
- Website: kveller.com
- Launched: September 28, 2010; 15 years ago
- Current status: Active

Kveller is a Jewish parenting website, founded in 2010 as a project of the Jewish education website, MyJewishLearning. The site's parent company is 70 Faces Media, the result of a 2015 merger between the Jewish Telegraphic Agency and MyJewishLearning. It is the largest on-line community of Jewish parents in the United States.

== History ==
The idea for the website, catering to Jewish parents, came from the Jewish learning website, MyJewishLearning as early as 2007.

A naming contest was held for the site, with thousands of submissions. Kveller, suggested by the writer, Sam Apple was chosen. The name derives from the Yiddish word, Kvell, meaning to express great pleasure combined with pride. The site received seed funding from UJA-Federation of New York.

The site's first editor was Deborah Kolben. Kolben was a new parent herself when the site was founded and saw its potential to pass on "solid core Jewish values".

The actress Mayim Bialik and Rabbi Danya Ruttenberg are among contributors to the site.

== Awards ==
In 2015, the site was awarded the Simon Rockower Award for Excellence in Jewish Journalism.

== See also ==
- Institute for Nonprofit News (member)
