= New York City Central Labor Council =

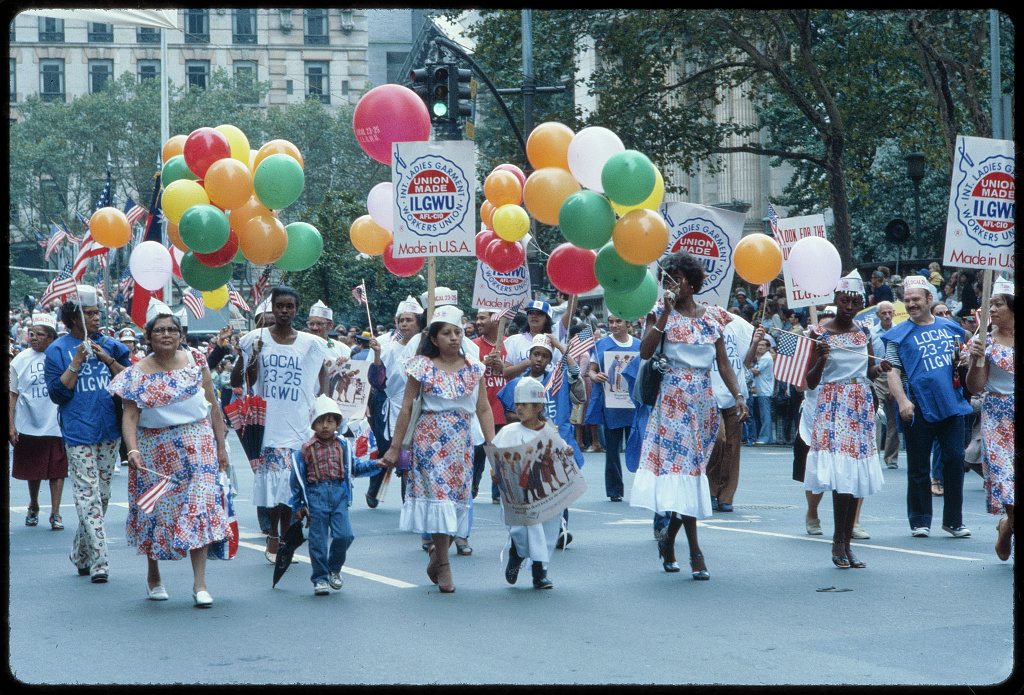
- 1981 Labor Day Parade
- Abbreviation: NYC CLC
- Founded: 1959
- Headquarters: 350 West 31st Street, New York, NY
- Location: New York City Metro
- Members: 1 million + (2025)
- President: Brendan Griffith
- Key people: Janella T. Hinds, Secretary-Treasurer
- Affiliations: AFL–CIO
- Website: nycclc.org

New York City Central Labor Council (NYCCLC) is the largest regional labor federation under the direction of the national AFL–CIO. Founded in 1959, the NYCCLC represents over 300 local New York City unions in both the public and private sectors of the New York economy. The organization represents over one million New York City workers, including teachers and municipal employees, truck drivers, healthcare workers, construction workers, first responders, retail workers, building service workers, transportation workers, hospitality workers, legal, academic, and cultural workers, etc. The New York Central Labor Council is a labor membership organization devoted to supporting, advancing and advocating for its affiliate organizations and the working people of New York City.

The New York City Central Labor Council plays a major role in New York City affairs and politics. The Council sponsors many protests, and throws its weight behind many New York City organizing drives. It also hosts the oldest and largest Labor Day Parade in the United States.

== Purpose ==
The NYCCLC's purpose is to improve the lives of its workers, their families, the communities of all five New York City boroughs, and to bring economic and social justice to New York City. The NYCCLC works with government leaders and various community groups to further worker empowerment in New York City. The council works to pass legislation and worker friendly policies through the New York City Council and New York State Legislature. The New York City Central Labor Council wields considerable influence with both local NYC and national policy makers.

The NYCCLC also builds worker power through political education and action, supporting economic development in New York City, being an active partner with business and government leaders, organizing workers who choose to be in a union, providing community service and job training, and conducting educational programs for its affiliate unions.

The Labor Council today reigns as "the largest municipal labor council in the country" a federation with 300 union locals and over 1 million members.

== Governance ==
The NYCCLC is governed by a President, a Secretary-Treasurer, and Executive Council, made up of representatives from its affiliated unions. Prominent national labor leader Harry Van Arsdale was the first President of the New York City Central Labor Council. He held this post from its formation in 1959 until his death in 1986. Another early leader was Morris Iushewitz. Vincent Alvarez served as the Council's first full-time President from 2011 until 2025.

Brendan Griffith has served as President since July 2025. Janella T. Hinds serves as the Secretary-Treasurer.

The NYCCLC is the local New York City affiliate of the national trade union center American Federation of Labor – Congress of Industrial Organizations (AFL–CIO). The New York City Central Labor Council is also the organization's largest local affiliate. The AFL–CIO's current national president is Liz Shuler.

== See also ==
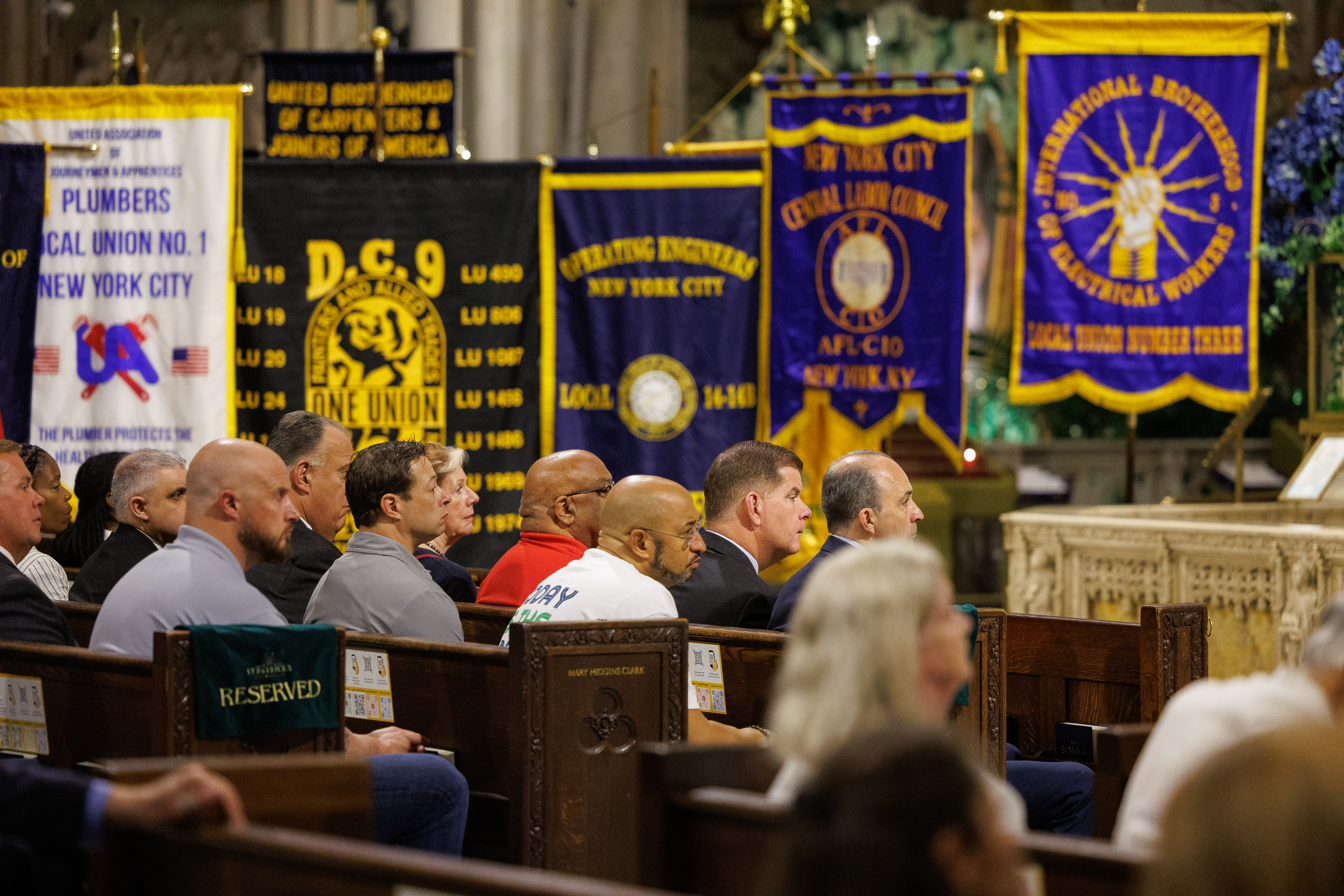
Mass prior to the 2022 Labor Day parade

- Harry Van Arsdale
- Morris Iushewitz
- Brian M. McLaughlin
