= Higgovale, Cape Town =

Suburb of Cape Town, in Western Cape, South Africa

Higgovale
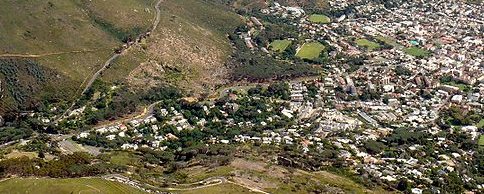
- Higgovale as seen from the summit of Table Mountain.

- Location within Western Cape Location within South Africa
- Coordinates: 33°56′22″S 18°24′09″E
- Country: South Africa
- Province: Western Cape
- Municipality: City of Cape Town
- Time zone: UTC+2 (SAST)
- Postal code (street): 8001

Higgovale is a suburb in the City Bowl region of Cape Town, South Africa. It is situated close to the Cape Town CBD, V&A Waterfront, and the beaches along the Atlantic Ocean coastline.

== Geography ==
Higgovale is located to the south of Camps Bay Drive and is bordered by the suburb of Camps Bay to the west and Oranjezicht to the east with Lions Head to its immediate north west.

Higgovale is named after the Higgo family who owned the land and the local quarry in the latter part of the 19th Century, and early part of the 20th century. The Higgo family emigrated from Cornwall in 1850. Higgo Vale also contains Higgo Road and Higgo Crescent.
