= Brooksley Born =

American lawyer

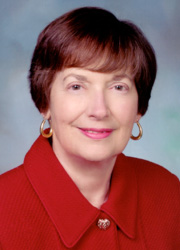

7th Chair of Commodity Futures Trading Commission
- In office August 26, 1996 – June 1, 1999
- President: Bill Clinton
- Preceded by: Mary Schapiro
- Succeeded by: David D Spears

Personal details
- Born: Brooksley Elizabeth Born; August 27, 1940 (age 86) San Francisco, California, U.S.
- Party: Democratic
- Spouse(s): Jack Landau (Divorced); Alexander Bennett
- Children: 5
- Education: Stanford University (BA, JD)

Brooksley Elizabeth Born (born August 27, 1940) is an American attorney and former public official who, from August 26, 1996, to June 1, 1999, was chair of the Commodity Futures Trading Commission (CFTC), the federal agency which oversees the U.S. futures and commodity options markets. During her tenure on the CFTC, Born lobbied Congress and the President to give the CFTC oversight of off-exchange markets for derivatives, in addition to its role with respect to exchange-traded derivatives, but her warnings were ignored or dismissed, and her calls for reform resisted by other regulators. Born resigned as chairperson on June 1, 1999, shortly after Congress passed legislation prohibiting her agency from regulating derivatives.

In 2009, Born received the John F. Kennedy Profiles in Courage Award, along with Sheila Bair of the Federal Deposit Insurance Corporation, in recognition of the "political courage she demonstrated in sounding early warnings about conditions that contributed" to the 2008 financial crisis.

== Early life and education ==
Born graduated from Abraham Lincoln High School (San Francisco, California) at the age of 16. She then attended Stanford University, where she majored in English and was graduated with the class of 1961. She initially wanted to become a doctor, but a guidance counsellor at Stanford advised her against medicine, so she majored in English literature instead.

She then attended Stanford Law School, one of only seven women in her class. She was the first female student ever to be named president of the Stanford Law Review. She received the "Outstanding Senior" award and graduated as valedictorian of the class of 1964.

=== Legal career ===
Immediately after law school Born was selected as a law clerk to judge Henry Edgerton of the U.S. Court of Appeals for the District of Columbia Circuit. It was during this time that she met her first husband, Jacob C. Landau, who was a journalist covering the Federal courts at the time. Following her clerkship, she became an associate at the Washington, D.C.-based international law firm of Arnold & Porter. Born was attracted to Arnold & Porter because it was one of the few major law firms to have a woman partner at that time, Carolyn Agger, who was the head of the tax practice. Born took a two-year leave of absence from Arnold & Porter to accompany her first husband to Boston, where he had received a fellowship. During that time she worked as a research assistant to law professor Alan Dershowitz.

Born's early career at Arnold & Porter focused on international trade law, in which she represented a number of Swiss industries and the government of Switzerland. She developed a practice representing clients in numerous complex litigation and arbitration cases involving financial market transactions. Among her high-profile cases was the matter of the Hunt Brothers attempt to corner the market in silver in the 1970s. She made partner at Arnold & Porter, after moving to a three-day schedule to help raise her second child, and eventually rose to be the head of the firm's derivatives practice.

Born was among the first female attorneys to systematically address inequities regarding how the laws treated women. Born and another female lawyer, Marna Tucker, taught what is considered to have been the first "Women and the Law" course at Catholic University’s Columbus School of Law. The class exclusively concerned prejudicial treatment of women under the laws of the United States, past and present. Born and Tucker were surprised to discover that there was no textbook on the issue at the time. Born is also one of the co-founders of the National Women's Law Center. Born also helped rewrite the American Bar Association rules to make it possible for more women and minorities to sit on federal bench.

During her long legal career, and into her retirement, Born did much pro bono and other types of volunteer work. She was active in the American Bar Association, the largest professional organization of lawyers in the United States. Initially Born was named a member of the governing council of the ABA's Individual Rights Section, eventually becoming chairperson. Born and Tucker founded the ABA Women's Caucus, the first organization of female lawyers in the ABA. She held several other senior positions in the ABA, including being named the first woman member of the ABA's Standing Committee on the Federal Judiciary. As a member of the Judiciary Committee, Born provided testimony and opinion on persons nominated for federal judgeships. In 1980 she was named chair of the committee. As chair of the committee, Born was invited to address the U.S. Congress regarding the nomination of Judge Sandra Day O'Connor to the U.S. Supreme Court.

In 1993, Born's name was floated as a possible candidate for Attorney General of the United States, but Janet Reno was nominated.

In July 2009, Nancy Pelosi appointed Brooksley Born as a commissioner to the Financial Crisis Inquiry Commission (FCIC).

== Born and the OTC derivatives market ==
Born was appointed to the CFTC on April 15, 1994, by President Bill Clinton. Due to litigation against Bankers Trust Company by Procter and Gamble and other corporate clients, Born and her team at the CFTC sought comments on the regulation of over-the-counter (OTC) derivatives, a first step in the process of writing CFTC regulations to supplement the existing regulations of the Federal Reserve System, the Options Clearing Corporation, and the National Association of Insurance Commissioners. Born was particularly concerned about swaps, financial instruments that are traded over the counter between banks, insurance companies or other funds or companies, and thus have no transparency except to the two counterparties and the counterparties' regulators, if any. CFTC regulation was strenuously opposed by Federal Reserve chairman Alan Greenspan, and by Treasury Secretaries Robert Rubin and Lawrence Summers. On May 7, 1998, former SEC Chairman Arthur Levitt joined Rubin and Greenspan in objecting to the issuance of the CFTC's concept release. Their response dismissed Born's analysis and focused on the hypothetical possibility that CFTC regulation of swaps and other OTC derivative instruments could create a "legal uncertainty" regarding such financial instruments, hypothetically reducing the value of the instruments. They argued that the imposition of regulatory costs would "stifle financial innovation" and encourage financial capital to transfer its transactions offshore. The disagreement between Born and the Executive Office's top economic policy advisors has been described not only as a classic Washington turf war, but also a war of ideologies, insofar as it is possible to argue that Born's actions were consistent with Keynesian and neoclassical economics while Greenspan, Rubin, Levitt, and Summers consistently espoused neoliberal, and neoconservative policies.

In 1998, a trillion-dollar hedge fund called Long Term Capital Management (LTCM) was near collapse. Using mathematical models to calculate debt risk, LTCM used derivatives to leverage $5 billion into more than $1 trillion, doing business with fifteen of Wall Street's largest financial institutions. The derivative transactions were not regulated, nor were investors able to evaluate LTCM's exposures. Born stated, "I thought that LTCM was exactly what I had been worried about". In the last weekend of September 1998, the President's working group was told that the entire American economy hung in the balance. After intervention by the Federal Reserve, the crisis was averted. In congressional hearings into the crisis, Greenspan acknowledged that language had been introduced into an agriculture bill that would prevent CFTC from regulating the derivatives which were at the center of the crisis that threatened the US economy. U.S. Representative Maurice Hinchey (D-NY) asked "How many more failures do you think we'd have to have before some regulation in this area might be appropriate?" In response, Greenspan brushed aside the substance of Born's warnings with the simple assertion that "the degree of supervision of regulation of the over-the-counter derivatives market is quite adequate to maintain a degree of stability in the system". Born's warning was that there wasn't any regulation of them. Born's chief of staff, Michael Greenberger summed up Greenspan's position this way: "Greenspan didn't believe that fraud was something that needed to be enforced, and he assumed she probably did. And of course, she did." Under heavy pressure from the financial lobby, legislation prohibiting regulation of derivatives by Born's agency was passed by the Congress. Born resigned on June 1, 1999.

The derivatives market continued to grow yearly throughout both terms of George W. Bush's administration. On September 15, 2008, the bankruptcy of Lehman Brothers forced a broad recognition of the 2008 financial crisis. As Lehman Brothers' failure temporarily reduced financial capital's confidence, a number of newspaper articles and television programs suggested that the failure's possible causes included the conflict between the CFTC and the other regulators.

Born declined to publicly comment on the unfolding 2008 crisis until March 2009, when she said: "The market grew so enormously, with so little oversight and regulation, that it made the financial crisis much deeper and more pervasive than it otherwise would have been." She also lamented the influence of Wall Street lobbyists on the process and the refusal of regulators to discuss even modest reforms.

An October 2009 Frontline documentary titled "The Warning" described Born's thwarted efforts to regulate and bring transparency to the derivatives market, and the continuing opposition thereto. The program concluded with an excerpted interview with Born sounding another warning: "I think we will have continuing danger from these markets and that we will have repeats of the financial crisis -- may differ in details but there will be significant financial downturns and disasters attributed to this regulatory gap, over and over, until we learn from experience."

In 2009 Born, along with Sheila Bair of the FDIC, was awarded the John F. Kennedy Profiles in Courage Award in recognition of the "political courage she demonstrated in sounding early warnings about conditions that contributed" to the 2008 financial crisis. According to Caroline Kennedy, "Brooksley Born recognized that the financial security of all Americans was being put at risk by the greed, negligence and opposition of powerful and well connected interests.... The catastrophic financial events of recent months have proved them [Born and Sheila Bair] right." One member of the President's working group had a change of heart about Brooksley Born. SEC Chairman Arthur Levitt stated "I've come to know her as one of the most capable, dedicated, intelligent and committed public servants that I have ever come to know", adding that "I could have done much better. I could have made a difference" in response to her warnings.

In 2010, a documentary film Inside Job further alleged that derivatives regulation was ineffective from the Clinton administration on. Along with fellow whistleblower, former IMF Chief Economist Raghuram Rajan, who was also scorned by the economic establishment, Brooksley Born was cited as one of the authorities arguing that financial derivatives increase economic risk.

== Personal life ==
Born is married to Alexander E. Bennett (also retired from Arnold & Porter). She has five adult children - two from a previous marriage to Jacob Landau and three stepchildren. Notably, Born was named a partner at Arnold & Porter while working part-time so she could raise her two young children. When both of her children were school-age, Born returned to practice full-time.
