= Morris Iushewitz =

American labor union leader in the Newspaper Guild, CIO, AFL-CIO

Morris Iushewits or Iushewitz (November 7, 1901 – September 18, 1981) was a union activist and leader of the Newspaper Guild, the Congress of Industrial Organizations (CIO), and the American Federation of Labor and Congress of Industrial Organizations (AFL–CIO).

== Background ==
Morris Iushewitz was born in 1901 in Ukraine and emigrated age one with his family to the United States. In 1916 during World War I, he served in the Canadian Army in France, Italy, and Palestine. Returning, he held various jobs including farming in the Midwest while finishing high school and then studied at the University of Wisconsin.

== Career ==
In the 1920s, Iushewitz worked for newspapers in Milwaukee and Chicago. In 1930, he moved to New York City, where he rose from freelance report to cable editor of the Jewish Telegraph Agency.

=== Newspaper Guild ===
In 1933, Iushewitz was a founding member of the Newspaper Guild (today, the NewsGuild-CWA).

=== CIO ===
Iushewitz served on the New York City Council of the Congress of Industrial Organizations, where duties included research director (1943) and secretary-treasurer (1949).

On September 9, 1948, Dubow and Joseph Forer (the best known pro-Communist lawyer in Washington and prominent member of the local chapter of the National Lawyers Guild) served as legal counsel to Maurice Braverman before HUAC.

During a 1952 hearing of the U.S. Senate's Committee on the Judiciary, Benjamin Mandel, director of research, read into the record a letter from Iushewitz concerning the Teachers Union (as member of the United Public Works Union):

EXHIBIT No. 21
NEW YORK CITY CIO COUNCIL
New York 1, N.Y., March 1, 1950
Hon. WILLIAM O'DWYER
Mayor of the City of New York
City Hall, New York, N.Y.
Dear Mr. Mayor: I am taking: this means of informing you that the United Public Workers of America has been expelled from the Congress of Industrial Organizations effective today. By an overwhelming vote, the Executive Board of the national Congress of Industrial Organizations concluded that "The policies and activities of the United Public Workers of America are consistently directed towards the achievement of the program and the purposes of the Communist Party rather than the objectives and policies set forth In the CIO constitution."
As a result of this expulsion, the United Public Workers of America is to day outside the ranks of organized labor In our country and has been exposed as an instrument of the Communist Party.
On behalf of the New York City CIO Council, I respectfully request you to please Inform the City Departments of the change in the status of the United Public Workers. I would further ask you instead to recognize the Government and Civic Employes Organizing Committee—CIO which has been set up by the CIO to represent CIO in this field. There are already functioning locals of civil service employees in a number of City Departments which have affiliated with the Government and Civic Employes Organizing Committee—CIO.
It is our sincere hope that you and the Administration which you head will extend cooperation to the duly recognized CIO group of civil service employees.
Sincerely yours,
Morris Iushewitz, Secretary-Treasurer

=== AFL-CIO ===
In 1955, when the AFL and CIO merged, Iushewitz carried on as secretary-treasurer of New York City Central Labor Council for the AFL-CIO.

== Personal life and death ==
Iushewitz married Clara Weiner and had three children.

During his union years, Iushewitz devoted much time to education matters. He served as the first union official on the New York City Board of Education. He also served as a trustee of the State University of New York.

Iushewitz died age 79 in New York City after a long illness.

== See also ==
- Newspaper Guild
- Congress of Industrial Organizations (CIO)
- New York City Central Labor Council
- AFL–CIO

== External sources ==
- Library of Congress: Rev. Martin Luther King receiving check for Alabama voter registration drive from Albert Shanker, president of the United Federation of Teachers, and Morris Iushewitz (1965)
- Cornell University Library: Morris Iuschewitz Interview Audiorecording and Transcript (1972)
