= 70 Faces Media =

American non-profit media organization

- Founded: 2015; 11 years ago
- Headquarters: New York City, New York, United States
- Key people: Ami Eden (CEO); Danielle Elkins (COO)
- Website: 70facesmedia.org

70 Faces Media is an American non-profit media organization focusing on the Jewish community. The name is a reference to the idea of the Torah having "70 faces," or multiple methods of espousal. The idea comes from the religious text Numbers Rabbah.

== History ==
70 Faces Media formed in 2015 as a merger of the Jewish Telegraphic Agency news agency and wire service, Jewish motherhood-focused website Kveller and Jewish education website MyJewishLearning. Together the 3 platforms generated 3.4 million pageviews per month.

In 2017, 70 Faces Media launched Hey Alma, an online magazine aimed at Jewish millennial women.

In December 2020, 70 Faces Media acquired New York Jewish Week, a community newspaper for the Jewish community of the metropolitan New York City area. The paper had suffered prior to purchase due to the COVID-19 pandemic.

== Publications ==
70 Faces Media publishes the following publications:

- JTA
- Kveller
- Alma
- Nosher
- MyJewishLearning
- New York Jewish Week

== Funding ==
The organization is supported by 25 philanthropic foundations, 45 Jewish federations, and 2,000 individual donors. Among its major funders are the Samuel and Saidye Bronfman Family Foundation, the Maimonides Fund, and the Jim Joseph Foundation.
