= Vredehoek =

Suburb of Cape Town, in Western Cape, South Africa

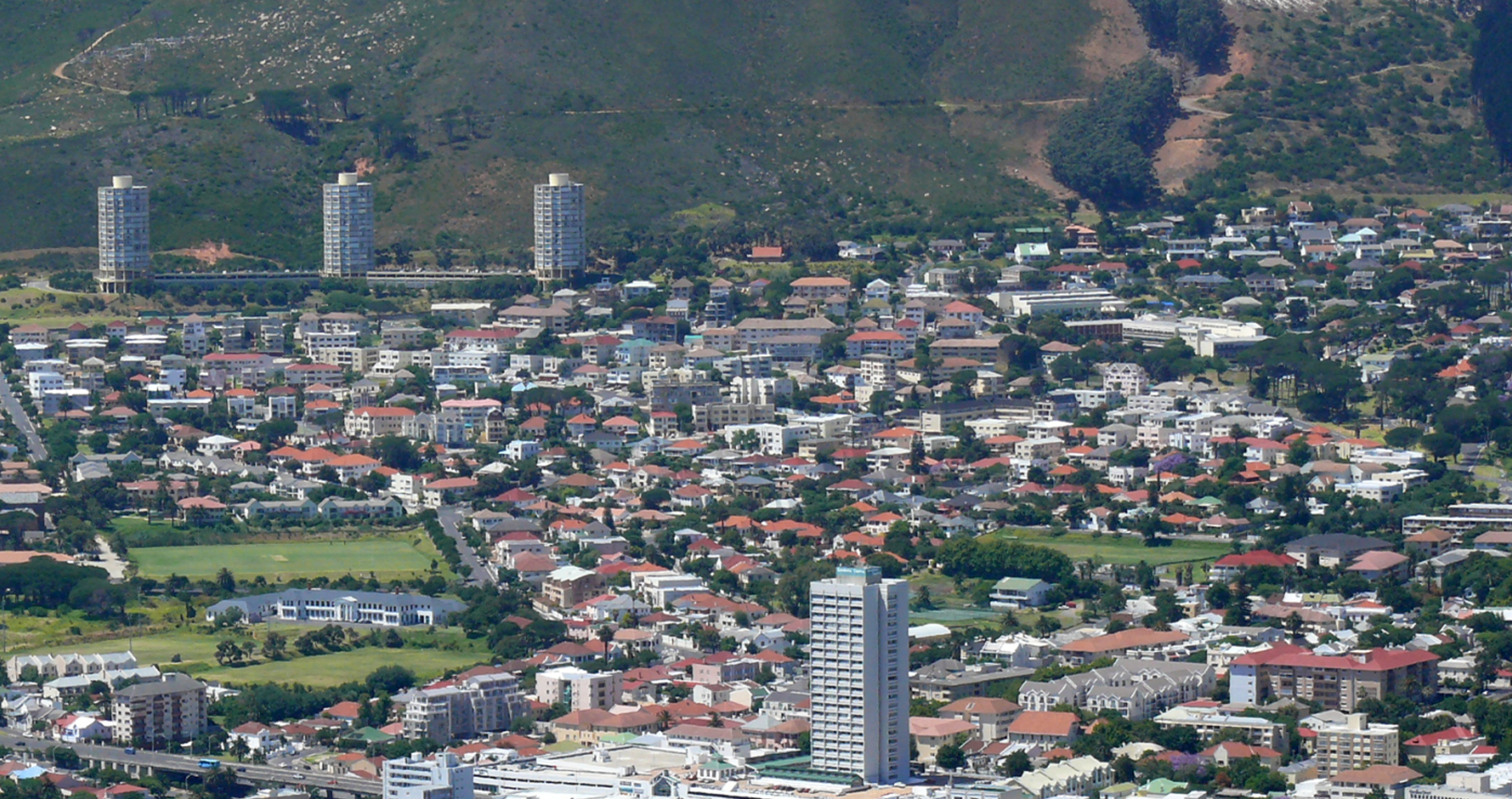
- Vredehoek seen from Signal Hill
- Interactive map of Vredehoek
- Coordinates: 33°56′15″S 18°25′30″E
- Country: South Africa
- Province: Western Cape
- Municipality: City of Cape Town
- Main Place: Cape Town

Area
  - Total: 0.94 km^{2} (0.36 sq mi)

Population (2011)
  - Total: 3,556
  - Density: 3,800/km^{2} (9,800/sq mi)

Racial makeup (2011)
  - Black African: 8.8%
  - Coloured: 5.6%
  - Indian/Asian: 2.0%
  - White: 80.4%
  - Other: 3.2%

First languages (2011)
  - English: 71.1%
  - Afrikaans: 18.3%
  - Other: 10.6%
- Time zone: UTC+2 (SAST)
- Postal code (street): 8001

Vredehoek (Afrikaans: [ˈfriədəɦuk], lit. 'peace corner') is a residential suburb of Cape Town, South Africa, located at the foot of Table Mountain and Devil's Peak. It is sandwiched between the two neighbouring suburbs of Oranjezicht and Devil's Peak Estate, the latter of which is often considered a sub-suburb of Vredehoek as they both fall under the neighbourhood watch community called DPV - Devil's Peak & Vredehoek.

The suburb is recognised by the three cylindrical Disa Park towers, many Art Deco-style buildings, and the area's public green spaces and parks. In 2011, the City of Cape Town census counted 5,415 people living in the area.

It is served by route 111 and 101 of the MyCiTi bus service.

== History ==
The suburb was proclaimed after the first world war, where immigrants from many European countries settled after peace was declared, hence the name of "peace corner". Vredehoek Farm and Elba Farm were among the earliest settlements in the eighteenth and nineteenth centuries. The Jurgens family were the original owners of Vredehoek farm in this period and where they built Vredehoek homstead, c1800. They sold the farm to Edward H. F. Mellish in 1883, “a man of means, energy, ability and high standards” and he transformed the farm into Cape Town's first dairy farm. Coupled with Mellish' death in 1905 and the mismanagement of the property by his son, all farming on the property ceased in 1916. Over the following decades, portions of the original farm were subdivided into residential lots. The homestead and part of the farm was sold to the University of Cape Town in 1924 and the homestead was used as a hostel by South African College Schools. Cape Town municipality purchased the property from the university in 1930. They demolished the homestead and created public recreational fields on the land. Some remaining part of the original estate were transferred to the Poor Sisters of Nazareth in 1926 and 1929. Elba Farm (later Prospect Hill Farm) was developed as Devil's Peak Estate, a residential suburb for Europeans.

=== Washerwomen at the Platteklip Wash House ===
On 1 April 1888, Cape Town's mayor commemorated the opening of wash houses near the Platteklip (Dutch: "flat stone") Stream. An estimated 200 washerwomen were expected to stop washing laundry in the stream and instead use new indoor facilities. This change was made as downstream small-holdings owners wanted clean water for crops and new sanitation laws were outlawing washing laundry in public streams.

The new wash houses required the washerwomen to pay a fee and this led to an initial boycott, after which the fee was dropped. Once the women began using the facility's standing basins, perhaps because of the comfort over bending to wash, the fee was re-introduced.

Before slavery was abolished at the South Africa in 1834, the washerwomen would have been primarily enslaved women. They used corn husks to scour lathered cloth and used nearby bushes, trees and rocks for places to hang wet laundry for drying.

The Platteklip Stream's fresh water comes off Table Mountain. It has historically been used by indigenous pastoralists to water their animals and for wild animals like buck to drink. The Khoekhoen people called the stream Camissa "The Place of Sweet Water" and European settlers who used it for refreshment after being at sea called it Varsche Rivier.

Buitenkant Street was previously known as Slaves' Walk, used by enslaved people to take laundry to the washerwomen.

Today, the site of the wash houses forms part of a roughly 3 km Washerwomen Trail and has been turned into an overnight cottage through SANParks.

=== Vredehoek Tin Mine ===
The public-access quarry above Vredehoek is a remnant of past tin mining in the area. Officially called the "Murray and Stewart Quarry" and more commonly, the Vredehoek Quarry, it is now used as a recreational amenity.

Mining started in 1911 and in 1912 The Cape Argus reported that cassiterite was being fetched out of a 180-foot deep shaft via an adit.

Mining was being carried out by an estimated 100 men employed by the Vredehoek Tin Company. Mining was discontinued after it was realised that it would be cheaper to mine tin in the Durbanville area and operations stopped completely during World War 1. It was reported that the mine had successfully produced roughly four tons (roughly 3600 kilograms) of ore concentrates.

=== Apartheid ===
During apartheid, Vredehoek was designated as a “whites-only” area as part of the Group Areas Act. Disa Park residential towers were built in the suburb in the late 1960s in response to a "white housing crisis" in racially segregated Cape Town.

== Architecture ==
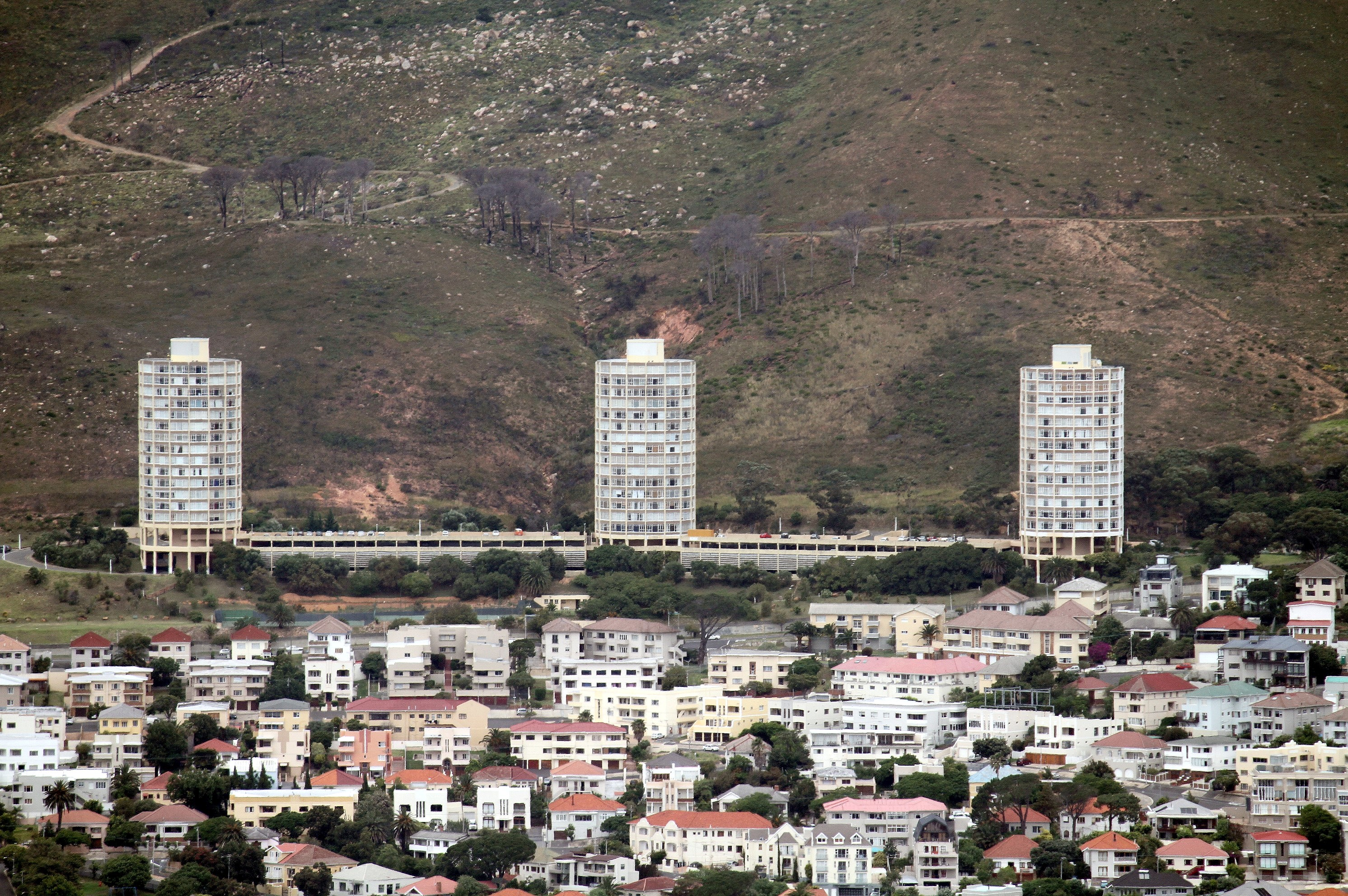
The Disa Park towers or "Tampon Towers"

=== Disa Park Towers ===
Vredehoek is easily recognised by the iconic architectural triptych on the City Bowl skyline, a series of three of 55-metre, cylindrical high-rise brutalist towers collectively making up Disa Park, known colloquially as "The Tampon Towers".

The National Party response to the white housing crisis resulted in several planning interventions, including the suspension of the city's zoning rules with regards to building height for developers willing to build housing in white Group Areas. Other developments include the nearby Gardens Centre, Sea Point's Twin Towers and Blouberg Heights.

The circular shape was intended to minimise the impact of the unrelenting Southeaster wind that blows from October to March each year, and to give affordable housing to over a thousand residents with panoramic views of the mountain, city and sea.

In 2004, Wallpaper listed Disa Park as one of the best buildings in Cape Town, however, the local response to the towers was almost instantly negative when they were completed in late 1969. The concrete facade, the political and social circumstance, and rumours of corruption were all criticised but the imposing height was considered particularly controversial. Though the base of the towers begins below the Table Mountain National Park, the 18 storeys stretch well beyond that, reaching 209 metres above sea level.

The towers are colloquially named "The Tampon Towers" amongst other names, however the developers' official names for the individual towers are Blinkwater, Platteklip and Silverstroom. The unrealised vision for the tower project would have seen up to 17 identical towers along the city skyline.

=== Kramats above Deer Park ===
Multiple Kramats can be found just above Deer Park in Vredehoek, including the Kramat of Sayed Abdul Haq al-Qadiri. Local Kramats or "Mazaars" are Islamic shrines marking the graves of muslim saints or notable religious leaders who died at the Cape, often after being banished by the Dutch from countries like India, Ceylon and Java. The local Deer Park forest and stream in Vredehoek provided sanctuary to runaway enslaved or imprisoned people. There are thousands of Kramats in the Western Cape, with 10 declared official heritage sites in 2021.

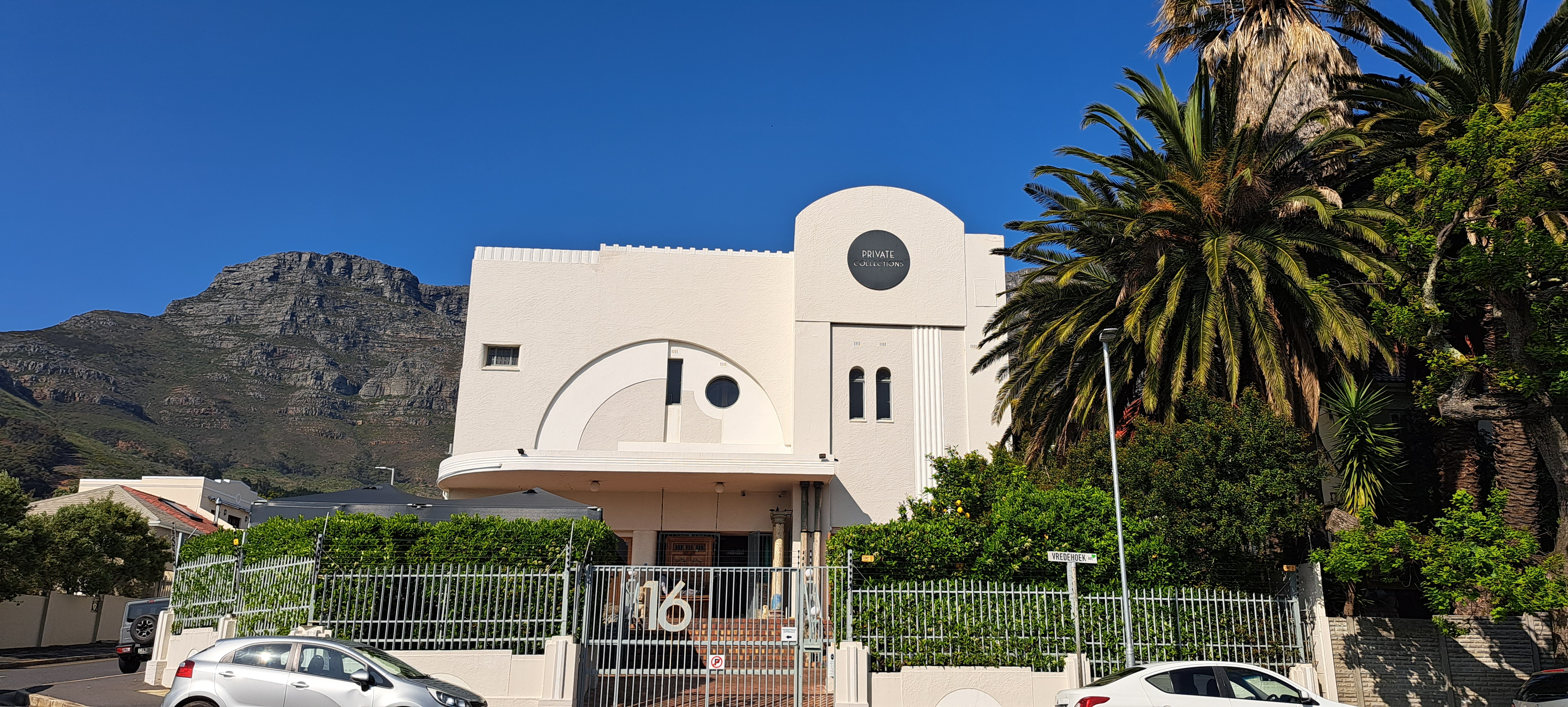
The old Vredehoek Shul built in the Art Deco style.

=== Art Deco buildings ===
Several apartment buildings in the Vredehoek area share a distinctive Art Deco style. The large concentration of the similar buildings give the area a unique character that a 2017 campaign by The Greater Vredehoek Heritage Action Group attempted to protect from threats of gentrification. Daventry Court, Sherwood Court and Victory Court are three examples of the style, which seldom goes over three storeys.

== Local flora, fauna and environment ==
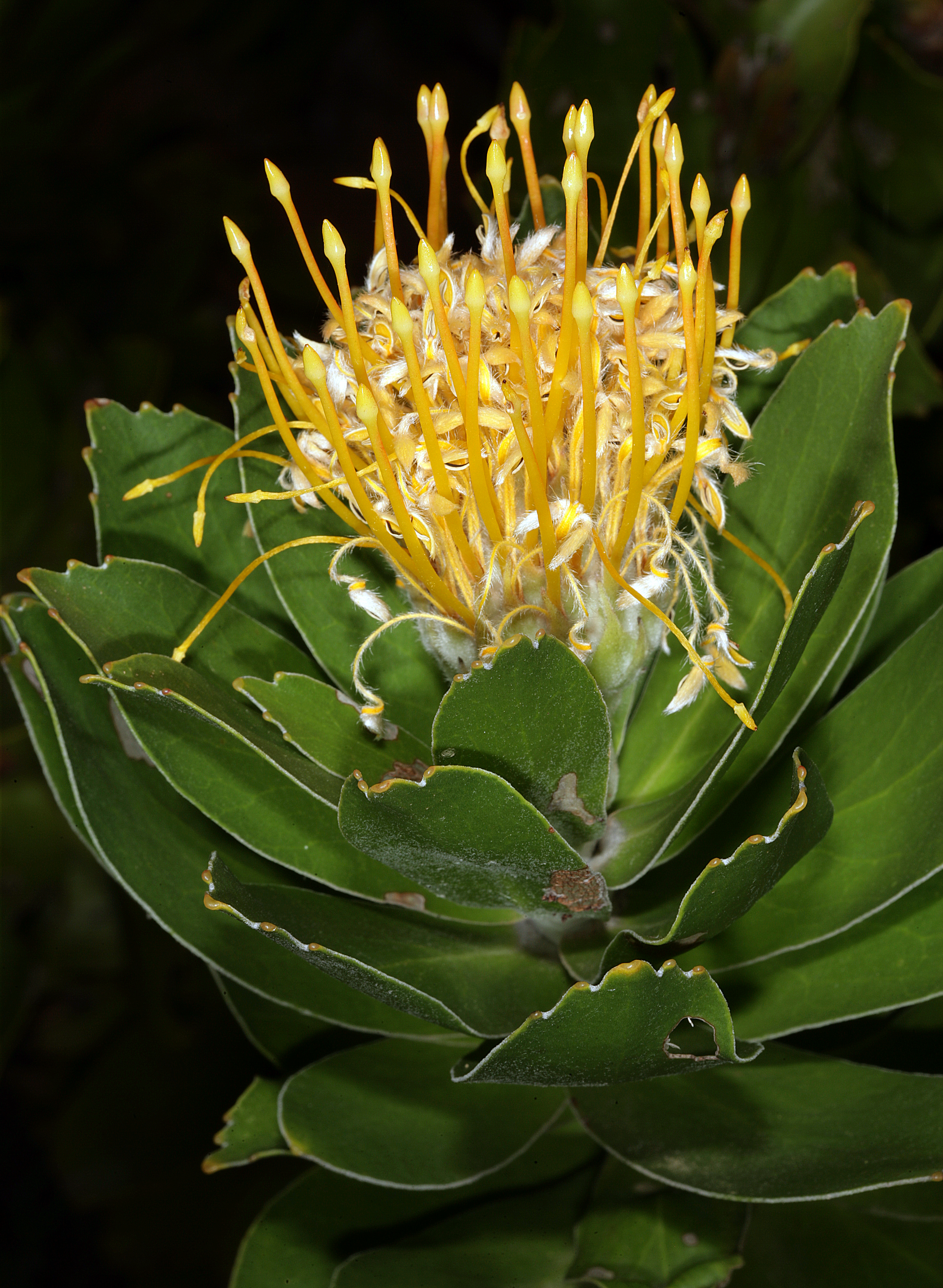
An example of Vredehoek's local flora, a Pincushion Tree with yellow colouring.

Because of its proximity to Table Mountain National Park, Vredehoek has an abundance of indigenous plants and fynbos including:

- Protea: large shrubs with broad leaves
- Erica: heath-like, low growing shrubs
- Restio: reed-like plants
- Geophyte: bulbs; these include watsonias and disas both of which occur mainly in wetland areas and are prominent after fires.

Some of the mature alien invasive trees that pose a threat to Vredehoek's indigenous plants are Port Jackson, Rooikrans, Hakea, Pine and blue gum.

In April 2021, a large fire on Table Mountain, which had started at UCT and had already caused damage to the UCT Library, Mosert's Mill and Rhodes Memorial, moved over Devil's Peak towards Vredehoek, causing residents to evacuate as a precautionary measure. Part of the reason for the spread were the winds reaching 45 kilometres per hour (28 mph). Cape Town high fire alert season traditionally ends at the end of April. While fire on Table Mountain can be beneficial to local fynbos plants, the threat to human settlement is also considered when deciding whether to extinguish.

During Winter 2023, high rainfall caused damage to the surrounding Table Mountain area and caused a sink hole and fallen tree in Deer Park.

== Residents ==
In 2011, the City of Cape Town census counted 5,415 people living in the area.

Vredehoek is popular among dual income households yet to have children, and the suburb has been going through an urban revival as older blocks of flats are being replaced with apartments.

== Jewish community ==
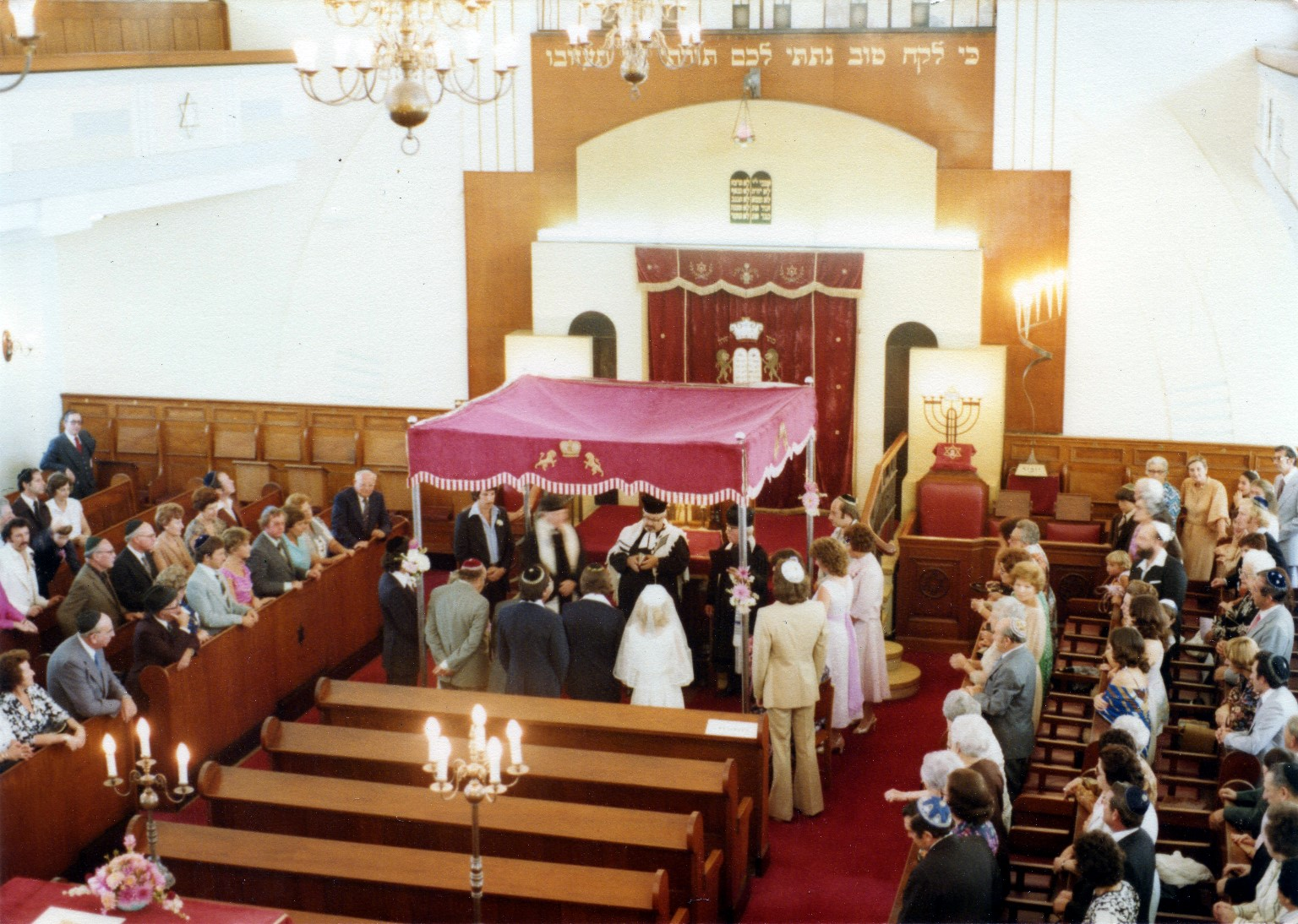
Wedding Chuppah at Vredehoek Shul, 1979

Vredehoek, Gardens and Sea Point have traditionally attracted Jewish communities. During the first half of the twentieth century, many Jewish immigrants from Europe, especially Lithuania settled in Cape Town. A number of Jewish immigrants living in the District Six area began to buy and build homes in Vredehoek. Many of the flats in Vredehoek were first owned by Jewish immigrants and have names such as Mont Sholem, Tel Hai Court and Herzlia. The Jewish community also established three synagogues in the suburb. The Vredehoek Shul opened in 1939 and was housed in an Art Deco building designed by John Joseph Ingber. The synagogue closed and was deconsecrated in 1993, eventually becoming an antiques store. The former synagogue is situated on Rabbi Mirvish Avenue, named after Moses Chaim Mirvish, the first Rabbi with Semikhah in the Cape Colony. The Schoonder Street Shul (also known as the “round shul”) designed by architect Max Policansky was opened in 1952 and was demolished in 2001. The Beit Midrash Morasha synagogue (then known as Beth Hamedrash), relocated to 22 Virginia Ave in 1945 from its previous home in District Six. The congregation left Vredehoek in 1954 to move to its present location in Sea Point.

Although many of Vredehoek's Jewish families have resettled in Sea Point, several Jewish institutions remain in the suburb. They include Highlands House, Cape Jewish Aged Home (1920-present) and a Jewish pre-primary, primary and High School under United Herzlia Schools. Meyer Hirsch Goldschmidt assisted in the founding of Herzlia School (originally United Hebrew Schools in Hope Street, Gardens) before moving to its present location in Vredehoek to accommodate a larger student intake. Therefore, M.H. Goldschmidt Avenue which leads up to the Herzlia Schools was named in his memory. Rabbi Barry Marcus MBE , a Rabbi of the Central Synagogue, Great Portland Street in London, was raised in Vredehoek, attended Herzlia School and taught Hebrew there.

== Gallery ==
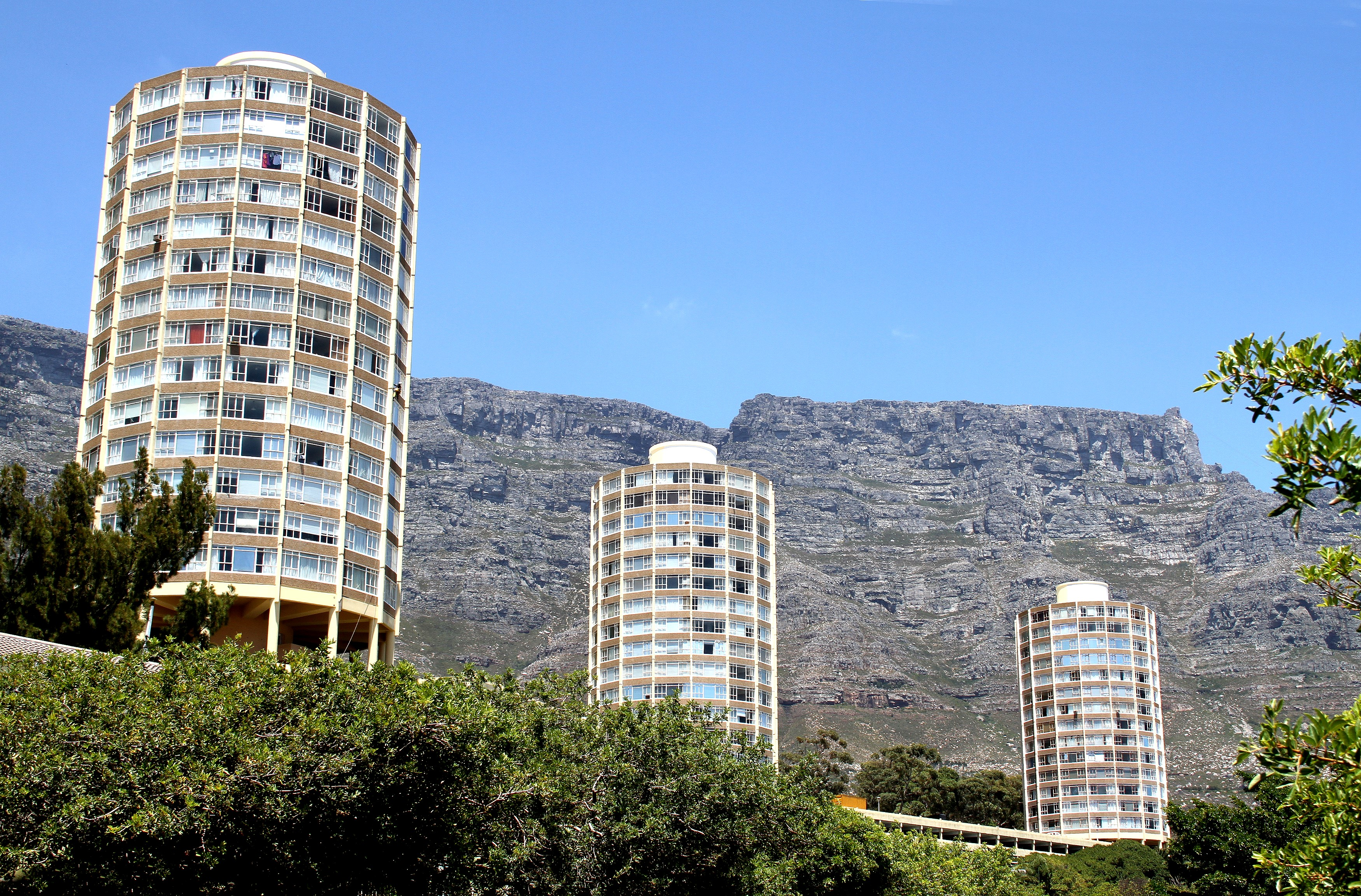
Disa Park viewed from Chelmsford Avenue, Vredehoek

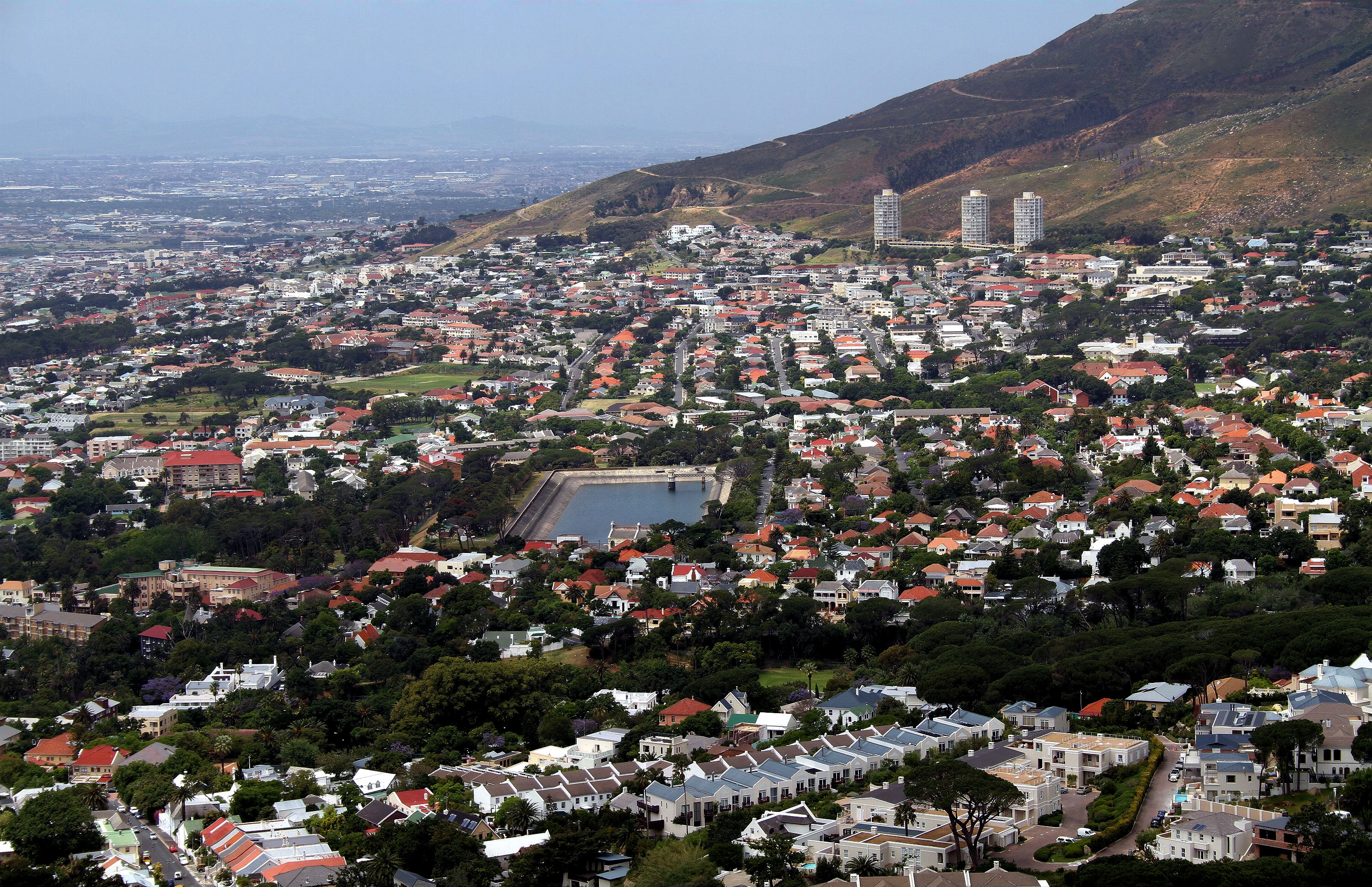
The City Bowl with the suburbs of Devil's Peak Estate, Vredehoek (and the three Disa Park towers in the background), Oranjezicht and Gardens, with Molteno Dam in the foreground.

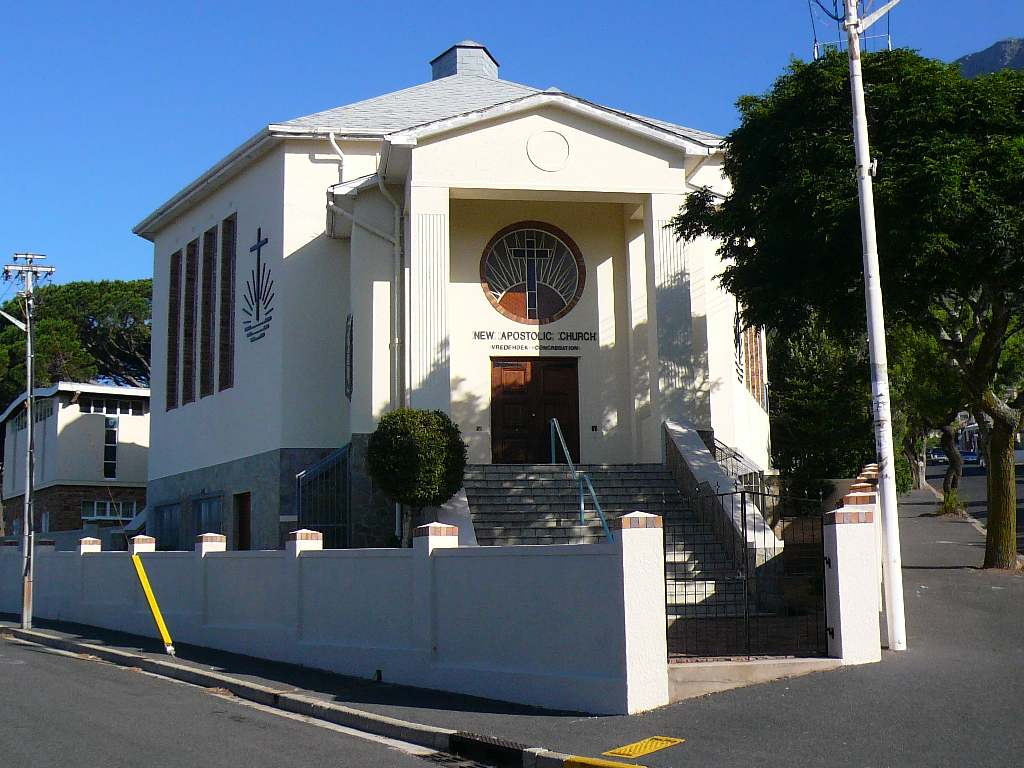
New Apostolic Church on Derry Street in Vredehoek.
