= Danya Ruttenberg =

American rabbi, editor, and author (born 1975)

Rabbi Danya Ruttenberg
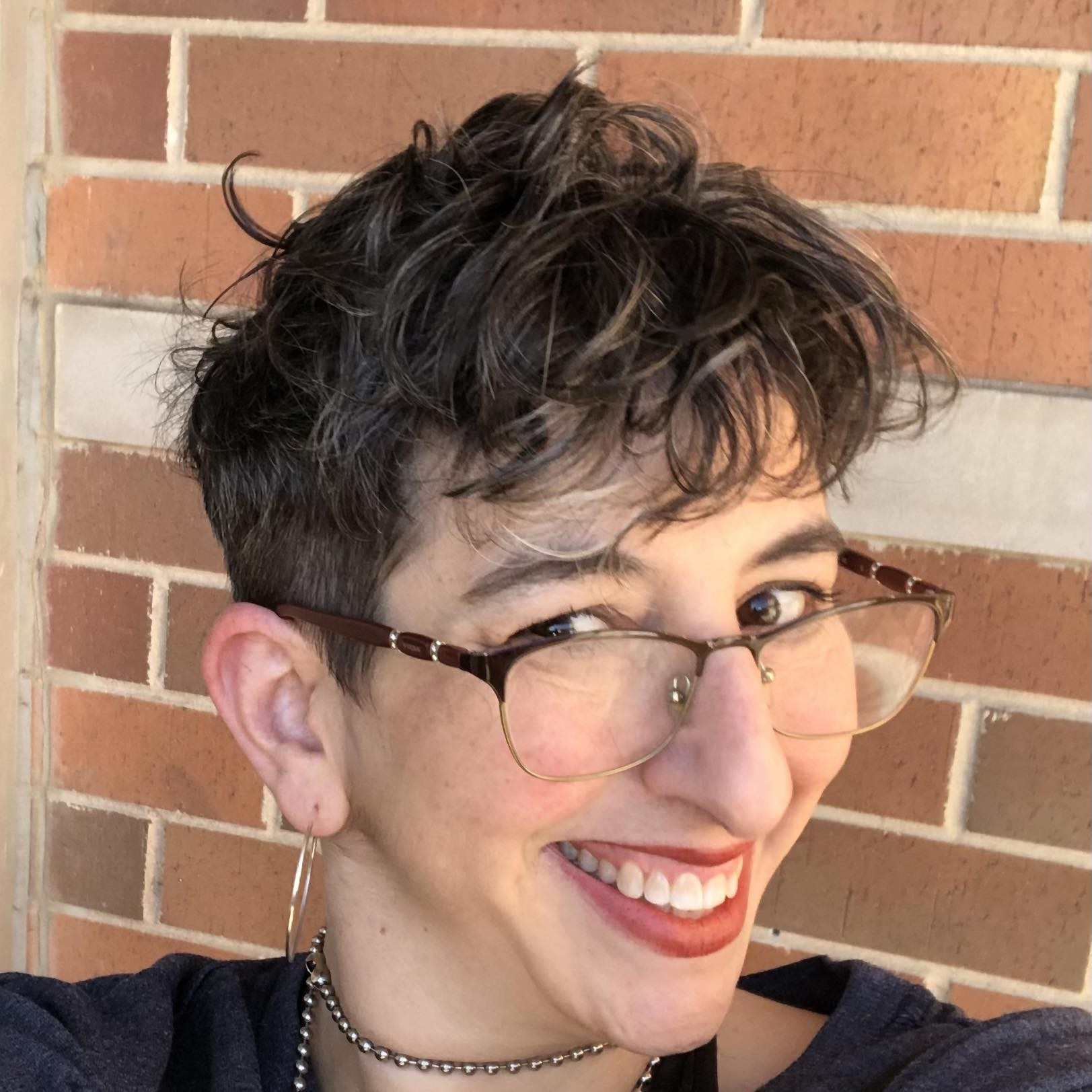
- Ruttenberg in 2024

Personal life
- Born: February 6, 1975 (age 51)
- Education: Brown University, BA Religious Studies
- Website: danyaruttenberg.net

Religious life
- Religion: Judaism
- Denomination: Conservative Judaism (formerly)

Jewish leader
- Semikhah: Ziegler School of Rabbinic Studies

Danya Ruttenberg (born February 6, 1975) is an American rabbi, editor, and author. She has been called "the Twitter rabbi" for her social media presence. She lives in Chicago.

== Biography ==
Ruttenberg's family attended a synagogue affiliated with Reform Judaism in Chicago growing up, and she describes herself as having been an atheist around that time. Ruttenberg later affiliated with Conservative Judaism.

When Ruttenberg was in college, her mother died of breast cancer. Her mother's death prompted Ruttenberg to rethink her relationship with religion and practice Jewish mourning rituals (e.g., sitting Shiva and reciting Kaddish Yatom daily), which she said helped her "make friends with Judaism, to be open to it". In 2008, she published a memoir about her spiritual awakening entitled Surprised by God: How I Learned To Stop Worrying and Love Religion.

She was ordained as a rabbi in 2008 by the Ziegler School of Rabbinic Studies, American Jewish University's rabbinical seminary, in Los Angeles, California.

She served as the senior Jewish educator at Tufts University Hillel beginning in May 2009, and went on to be the campus rabbi at Northwestern University Hillel and director of education for the campus dialogue program Ask Big Questions. She was Rabbi-in-Residence for the community service group Avodah in 2019.

On the evening of February 6, 2017, Ruttenberg and 18 other rabbis associated with Jewish human rights organization T'ruah were arrested while protesting the Trump travel ban outside of Trump Tower. She described her arrest as a "profoundly holy experience" and compared it to the sacrifices offered at the Temple in Jerusalem.

In 2020, she became Scholar-in-Residence for the National Council of Jewish Women (NCJW). While at the NCJW, she launched Rabbis for Repro, a Jewish reproductive rights group.

In 2021, she wrote an open letter condemning attempts to rehabilitate the reputation of Steven M. Cohen after his 2018 departure from Stanford University over sexual harassment. The letter was signed by 500 rabbis. In 2023, she and several other former students of the Ziegler School sent a letter to the Rabbinical Assembly regarding sexism, homophobia, and sexual harassment at the school. The letter asked for an investigation and a change in leadership.

In July 2024, she announced that she had disaffiliated from Conservative Judaism and was in the process of joining a different rabbinical association.

== Awards and honors ==
- Finalist for Surprised by God – Sami Rohr Prize for Jewish Literature, 2010
- "36 Under 36" (Note: 36 most influential leaders under age 36) – The Jewish Week, 2010
- Top 50 most influential women rabbis – The Jewish Daily Forward, 2010
- Finalist for Nurture the Wow – National Jewish Book Award 2016
- Parents' Choice selection for Nurture the Wow – PJ Library, 2016
- 21 Faith Leaders to Watch – Center for American Progress, 2021
- Contemporary Jewish Life and Practice Award for On Repentance and Repair – 72nd National Jewish Book Awards, 2023.

== Bibliography ==
=== Writer ===
- On Repentance And Repair: Making Amends in an Unapologetic World (2022)
- Nurture the Wow (2016)
- Surprised by God (2008)

=== Editor ===
- Jewish Choices, Jewish Voices: War and National Security with Elliot Dorff (2010)
- Jewish Choices, Jewish Voices: Sex and Intimacy with Elliot Dorff (2010)
- Jewish Choices, Jewish Voices: Social Justice with Elliot Dorff (2010)
- The Passionate Torah: Sex and Judaism (2009)
- Yentl's Revenge: The Next Wave of Jewish Feminism (2001)
- Lilith, contributing editor
- Women in Judaism, contributing editor

=== Contributor ===
Book chapters Ruttenberg has written include:

- "Priority Lists: A Dialogue on Judaism, Feminism, and Activism", with Rebecca Alpert in Righteous Indignation: A Jewish Call for Justice (2013)
- "The Hermenuetics of Curiosity: On Reclamation", in New Jewish Feminism (2008)
- "Fringe Me Up, Fringe Me Down: On Getting Dressed in Jerusalem", in Bitchfest: 10 Years of Writing From the Pages of Bitch Magazine (2006)
- "Towards a New Tzniut", in Yentl's Revenge (2001)

Ruttenberg has also published pieces in The Atlantic, The Forward, The Huffington Post, The Jewish Journal of Greater Los Angeles, Kveller, The New York Times, Newsweek, Time Magazine, Salon, The San Francisco Chronicle, Sojourners, Tablet Magazine, and The Washington Post, and other publications.
