= Beit Midrash Morasha =

Modern Orthodox synagogue in Cape Town, South Africa

- Location of the synagogue in Greater Cape Town

Religion
- Affiliation: Modern Orthodox Judaism
- Rite: Nusach Ashkenaz
- Ecclesiastical or organizational status: Synagogue
- Leadership: Rabbi Sam Thurgood
- Status: Active

Location
- Location: 31 Arthur's Road, Sea Point, Cape Town
- Country: South Africa
- Interactive map of Beit Midrash Morasha
- Coordinates: 33°55′04″S 18°23′22″E

Architecture
- Architect: Francois Hesse
- Type: Church
- Established: 1897 (as a congregation)
- Completed: 1925 (as a church); 1954 (as a synagogue)

Website
- morasha.co.za

The Beit Midrash Morasha is a Modern Orthodox Jewish congregation and synagogue, located on Arthur's Road, in Sea Point, a seaside suburb of Cape Town, South Africa. The congregation was first established in 1897 in District Six, before relocating to Vredehoek in 1945. It moved to its present location in Sea Point in 1954.

== History ==
The congregation, then known as Beth Hamedrash was established in 1897 on Buitenkant St in District Six as a Chabad congregation. The building was built and paid for by Mr Israel Roytowski. The congregation was founded by Russian-Jewish immigrants as they felt unfamiliar with the religious traditions of the Anglo-Jewish Gardens Shul. The building was consecrated and opened by Rev A. P. Bender of the Gardens Shul. The area at the time had a high population of Yiddish-speaking Jewish immigrants from Eastern Europe. As the Jewish community increased their economic standing and left the area, the congregation moved briefly to 22 Virginia Avenue in Vredehoek in 1945, where much of the Jewish population had resettled. As the congregation was growing it moved again to a larger building in 1954 on Arthur's Road in Sea Point, where there was an established Jewish community.

The 1925 building had been a Dutch Reformed Church, and was converted into a synagogue. In 1957, Rabbi Gourarie was appointed to lead the congregation and he gave his sermons in Yiddish. The Chabad form of Orthodox Judaism failed to connect with Jewish residents in Sea Point, and in response it became a Modern Orthodox synagogue. The newly reformed congregation was led by Rabbi Mendel Popack.

In 2018, the synagogue was severely damaged in a fire, and seven Torah scrolls were destroyed. It has since been redesigned and fully restored.

== See also ==
- History of the Jews in South Africa
- List of synagogues in South Africa
