= Jacob Landau (publisher) =

American journalist (1892-1952)

- Born: 1892
- Died: 1952
- Education: University of Vienna
- Occupation: Journalist
- Employer: Jewish Telegraphic Agency
- Organizations: Zionist Movement
- Known for: Founder of the Jewish Telegraphic Agency (JTA), Co-founder of The Jerusalem Post (formerly The Palestine Bulletin)

Jacob Landau (1892-1952) was an Austrian-born American journalist who founded the Jewish Telegraphic Agency, the first Jewish news agency and wire service.

== Early life ==
Landau was born in Austria in 1892. As a student at the University of Vienna, he was active in the Zionist movement.

== Career ==
In 1917, at the age of 25, Landau co-founded the Jewish Telegraphic Agency (JTA), then known as the Jewish Correspondence Bureau, based in The Hague, the first Jewish news agency and wire service. After World War I, Landau moved the organization's offices to London. In the early 1920s, Landau established New York City as the global headquarters of JTA.

In January 1925, Landau founded The Palestine Bulletin, an English-language broadsheet published in Mandatory Palestine. The Palestine Bulletin would eventually become The Jerusalem Post.
