= Jewish Telegraphic Agency =

American Jewish news agency and wire service

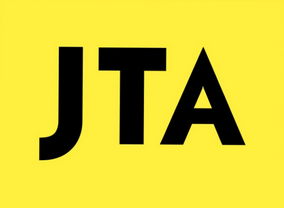
- Type: Subsidiary
- Industry: News media
- Founded: February 6, 1917; 109 years ago
- Founder: Jacob Landau
- Headquarters: New York City, United States
- Area served: Worldwide
- Key people: Ami Eden, CEO and executive editor Philissa Cramer, editor-in-chief
- Products: Wire service
- Parent: 70 Faces Media
- Website: www.jta.org

The Jewish Telegraphic Agency (JTA) is an international news agency and wire service that primarily covers Judaism- and Jewish-related topics and news. Described as the "Associated Press of the Jewish media", JTA serves Jewish and non-Jewish newspapers and press around the world as a syndication partner. Founded in 1917, it is the world Jewry's oldest and most widely-read wire service. JTA's parent company is 70 Faces Media.

== History ==
The Jewish Telegraphic Agency was founded in The Hague, Netherlands, as the first Jewish news agency and wire service, then known as the Jewish Correspondence Bureau on February 6, 1917, by 25-year-old Jacob Landau. Its mandate was to collect and disseminate news affecting the Jewish communities around the world, especially from the fronts of the European theatre of World War I. In 1919, it moved to London, under its current name. In 1922, the JTA moved its global headquarters to New York City. By 1925, over 400 newspapers, both Jewish and non-Jewish, subscribed to the JTA.

In November 1937, the Gestapo (the secret police of Nazi Germany) closed JTA's Berlin bureau, charging it with "endangering public safety and order." In 1940, the JTA spawned the Overseas News Agency (ONA). Although designed to appear like a normal news agency, it was in fact secretly funded by the British intelligence service, MI6. ONA provided press credentials to British spies and planted fake news stories in US newspapers. Meyer Levin was a war correspondent in Europe during World War II, representing the Overseas News Agency and the JTA.

Its cable service improved the quality and range of Jewish periodicals. Today, it has correspondents in Washington, DC, Jerusalem, Moscow, and 30 other cities in North and South America, Israel, Europe, Africa, and Australia. The JTA is committed to covering news of interest to the Jewish community with journalistic objectivity. As of 2014, JTA had a budget of US$2 million.

In 2015, the news service merged with Jewish education website MyJewishLearning to create 70 Faces Media, the largest Jewish media group in North America. MyJewishLearning was founded in 2003 and hosted more than 5,000 articles about Jewish life history, culture, and education. Other sister publications are Kveller, Alma, Nosher, and New York Jewish Week.

== Staff ==
Landau, JTA's original publisher, later founded The Palestine Bulletin, an English-language broadsheet published in Mandatory Palestine in 1925. The Palestine Bulletin became The Palestine Post and eventually The Jerusalem Post.

Journalist Daniel Schorr began his career as an assistant news editor for the JTA from 1934 to 1941.

Haskell Cohen was the sports editor for the JTA for 17 years; he is best known for later as the NBA director of public relations creating the NBA All Star Game in 1951. Harold U. Ribalow was later the sports editor of the JTA. In the 1960s, novelist and lawyer Eleazar Lipsky was the JTA's president.

Lillie Shultz, later a journalist and the chief administrative officer of the American Jewish Congress, was a staff member of the JTA in the early 1930s.

=== Editors-in-Chief ===
Boris Smolar joined the JTA in 1924, and retired as its editor-in chief in 1967.

In January 2020, Philissa Cramer, co-founder and editor-at-large of nonprofit news organization Chalkbeat was named JTA's editor-in-chief. Cramer replaced Andy Silow-Carroll, who took the same post at New York Jewish Week in mid-2019 after three years at the helm.

== Editorial policy and reputation ==
The JTA is a not-for-profit corporation governed by an independent board of directors. It is apolitical and non-denominational in its coverage of Judaism and Jewish-related topics. According to editor-in-chief and CEO and publisher Ami Eden, JTA "respects the many Jewish and Israel advocacy organizations out there, but JTA has a different mission: to provide readers and clients with balanced and dependable reporting". He cited JTA's coverage of the Mavi Marmara activist ship. JTA is an affiliate of 70 Faces Media, a not-for-profit American media company.

JTA is considered the "Associated Press of Jewish media". JTA's main competitor is the more conservative Jewish News Syndicate, launched in 2011. JTA is still world Jewry's oldest and most widely-read wire service. According to journalist and author Stephen Schwartz, JTA is "a news service respected for its professionalism and independence.

In 1933, Nobel Prize winner Albert Einstein said in a speech at a dinner in his honor that the JTA was "very close to my heart", and that the JTA was keeping the public informed about the lot of the Jews in all countries: "in a graphic and objective manner, and in so doing it has performed an important service ..."

In March 1942, in connection with its 25th anniversary the JTA received congratulatory messages from U.S. President Franklin D. Roosevelt ("I trust through long decades to come that this medium of information will serve the world with fidelity and courage by the widest possible dissemination of the truth") as well as U.S. Secretary of War Henry Stimson, British Ambassador Lord Halifax, Director of the U.S. Office of War Department of Facts and Figures Archibald MacLeish, Director of the U.S. Office of Government Reports Lowell Mellett, and Benjamin V. Cohen of the U.S. National Power Policy Committee.

== Notable interviews ==
- Julia Haart
- Melissa Rosenberg
- Idina Menzel
- Ezra Furman
- Jimmy Carter

== Awards ==
In 2021, JTA received ten Simon Rockower Awards, and 16 Rockower Awards in 2022, including eight first places. In 2023, the magazine won 20 Rockower Awards.

== See also ==
- Institute for Nonprofit News (member)
- Morris Iushewitz
- Jewish Insider
- The Jewish Week
