= Jacob Landau (journalist) =

American journalist (1934–2008)

Jacob C. Landau
- Born: April 10, 1934; Englewood, New Jersey, USA
- Died: August 9, 2008 (aged 74); Arlington, Virginia, USA
- Other name: Jack Landau
- Education: Harvard University; New York University School of Law
- Occupations: Journalist and Lawyer

Jacob Charles "Jack" Landau (April 10, 1934 – August 9, 2008) was an American journalist, attorney, government official, and free-speech activist. He was the founding first executive director of the Reporters Committee for Freedom of the Press.

== Biography ==
Jack Landau was born to Jacob and Florence Landau (formerly Florence Binaghi). He spent his elementary school years in Englewood, New Jersey, but the family moved to New Rochelle, New York, when he was 12 years old. Landau attended New Rochelle High School, where he was a varsity swimmer and voted "most talkative boy." He then attended Harvard College, where he majored in history. After graduating from Harvard, Landau lived briefly in San Francisco, working retail jobs and trying to write fiction.

Prior to the establishment of the Reporters Committee, Landau worked as a journalist for several national news organizations including the Bergen Record, Associated Press and The Washington Post. His stories covered numerous topics, but his specialty was reporting on the American courts. Landau was a Harvard College graduate and legally trained reporter in an era when this was an oddity, having received a law degree from New York University. His reports of inequities in the American military justice system are credited with having prompted the reform of that system into its current modern shape. He also covered the Cuban Revolution for the Associated Press, stationed in Havana (Landau spoke conversational Spanish).

Landau also served as the press secretary to United States Attorney General John Mitchell, who served under President Richard Nixon. As the spokesman for Mitchell, Landau addressed the public concerning many of the difficult legal issues facing the U.S. Government during the late 1960s. During one incident, he addressed a hostile and abusive crowd of activists opposed to the Vietnam War who were demanding an audience with the Attorney General during a large-scale protest. Their leader was American Beat poet Allen Ginsberg, who purportedly dismissed Landau as a tool of the establishment.

Ironically, it was Landau's organization, the Reporters Committee for Freedom of the Press, that would rock the establishment by preventing Richard Nixon from destroying his records in the wake of the Watergate scandal. Under Landau's leadership, the Reporters Committee would become America's foremost activist organization in furtherance of the rights of journalists and reporters. This work won Landau numerous awards and accolades. He had a falling-out with the Reporters Committee during the late 1980s, after which he left to write a popular column in the Newhouse News syndicate of daily newspapers.

Landau was retired at the time of his death. He was divorced and had two children with former spouse, attorney Brooksley E. Born.

== Honours and awards ==
- Nieman Fellow, Harvard University
- Lovejoy Award, Colby College
- Honorary LLD, Colby College
- National Freedom of Information Act Hall of Fame (Charter Member), First Amendment Center
- Silver Gavel Award, American Bar Association
- Fellows of the Society Award, Sigma Delta Chi Foundation, Society of Professional Journalists
- Hugh M. Hefner First Amendment Award, 1985.
