= City Bowl =

Region of Cape Town, South Africa

City Bowl The City Bowl
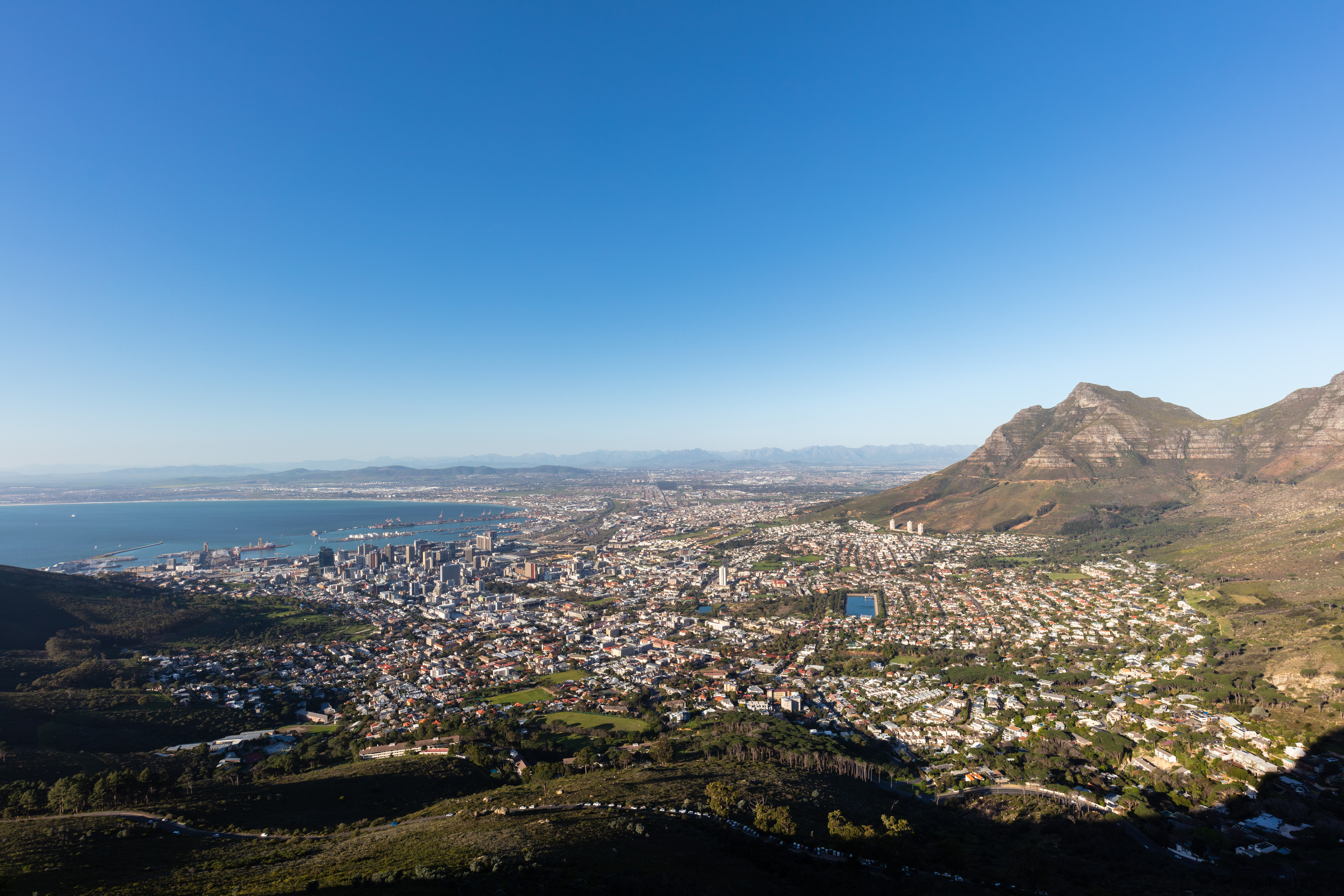
- The City Bowl viewed from Table Mountain
- Interactive map of City Bowl
- Coordinates: 33°55′37.956″S 18°24′49.397″E
- Country: South Africa
- Province: Western Cape
- Municipality: City of Cape Town
- City: Cape Town

Area
  - Total: 32.6 km^{2} (12.6 sq mi)

Population (2011 census)
  - Total: 117,900
  - Density: 3,620/km^{2} (9,370/sq mi)
- Area code: 021

The City Bowl is a region of Cape Town, South Africa. Bordered by Table Bay, and defined by the mountains of Signal Hill, Lion's Head, Table Mountain, and Devil's Peak, the area has a natural bowl-like shape. It is home to numerous suburbs, including Cape Town CBD, the city's main economic hub.

== Suburbs ==
The suburbs that comprise the City Bowl region are as follows:

- Bo-Kaap
- Cape Town CBD
- Devil's Peak Estate
- De Waterkant
- The Foreshore
- Gardens
- Higgovale
- Oranjezicht
- Salt River
- Tamboerskloof
- University Estate
- Vredehoek
- Walmer Estate (District Six)
- Woodstock
- Zonnebloem (District Six)

== Gallery ==
Map of the City Bowl

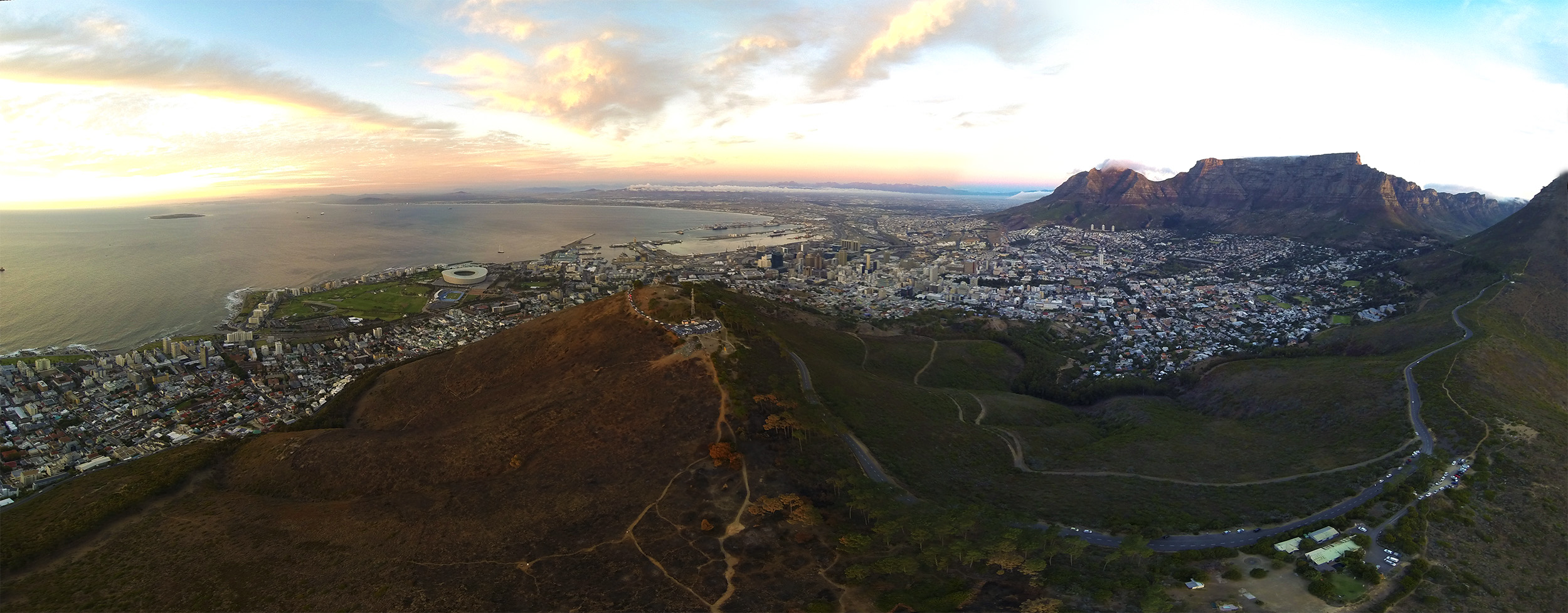
An aerial panoramic of Cape Town's City Bowl taken from above Signal Hill looking north

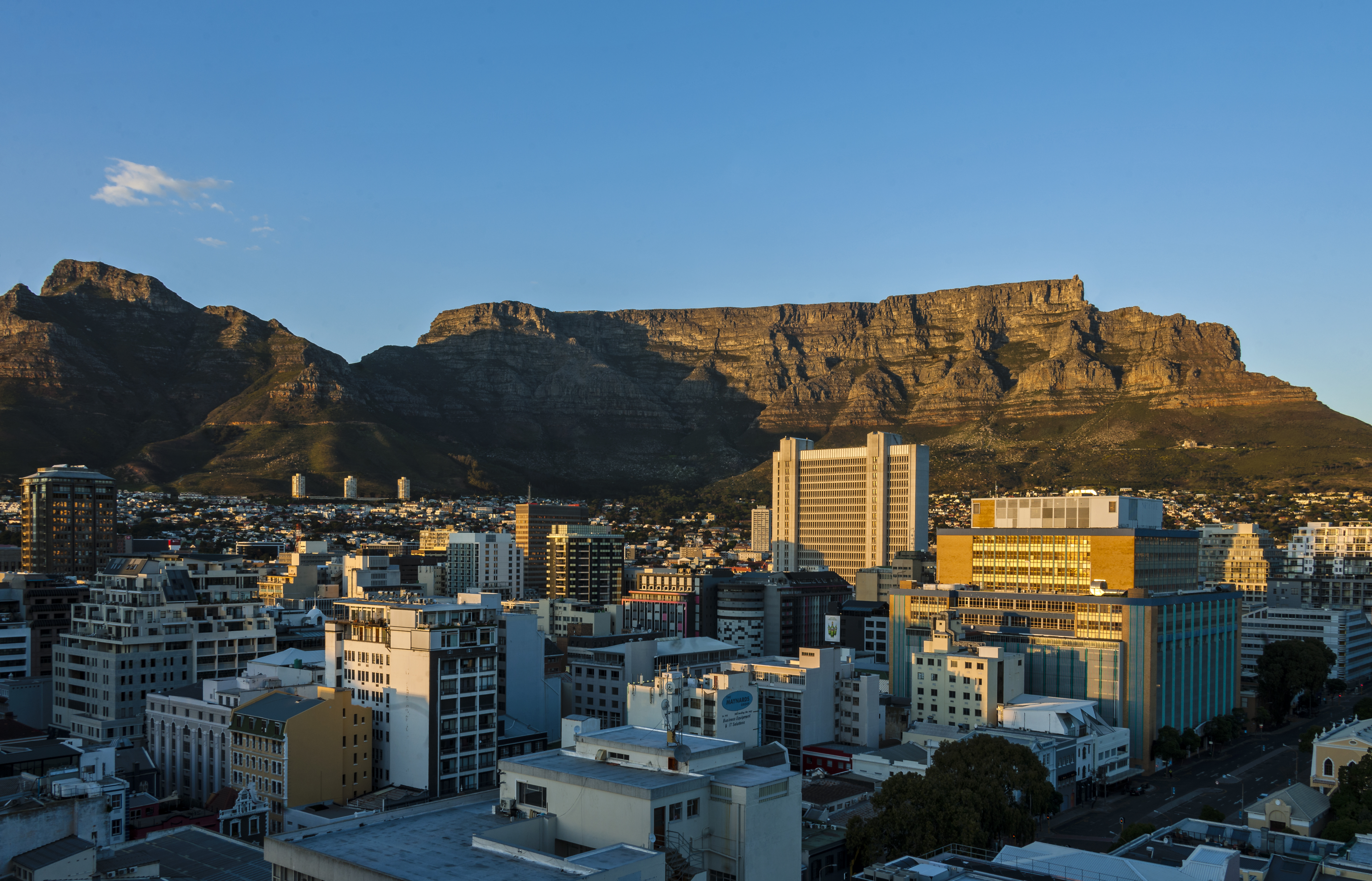
Cape Town CBD and Table Mountain at dawn

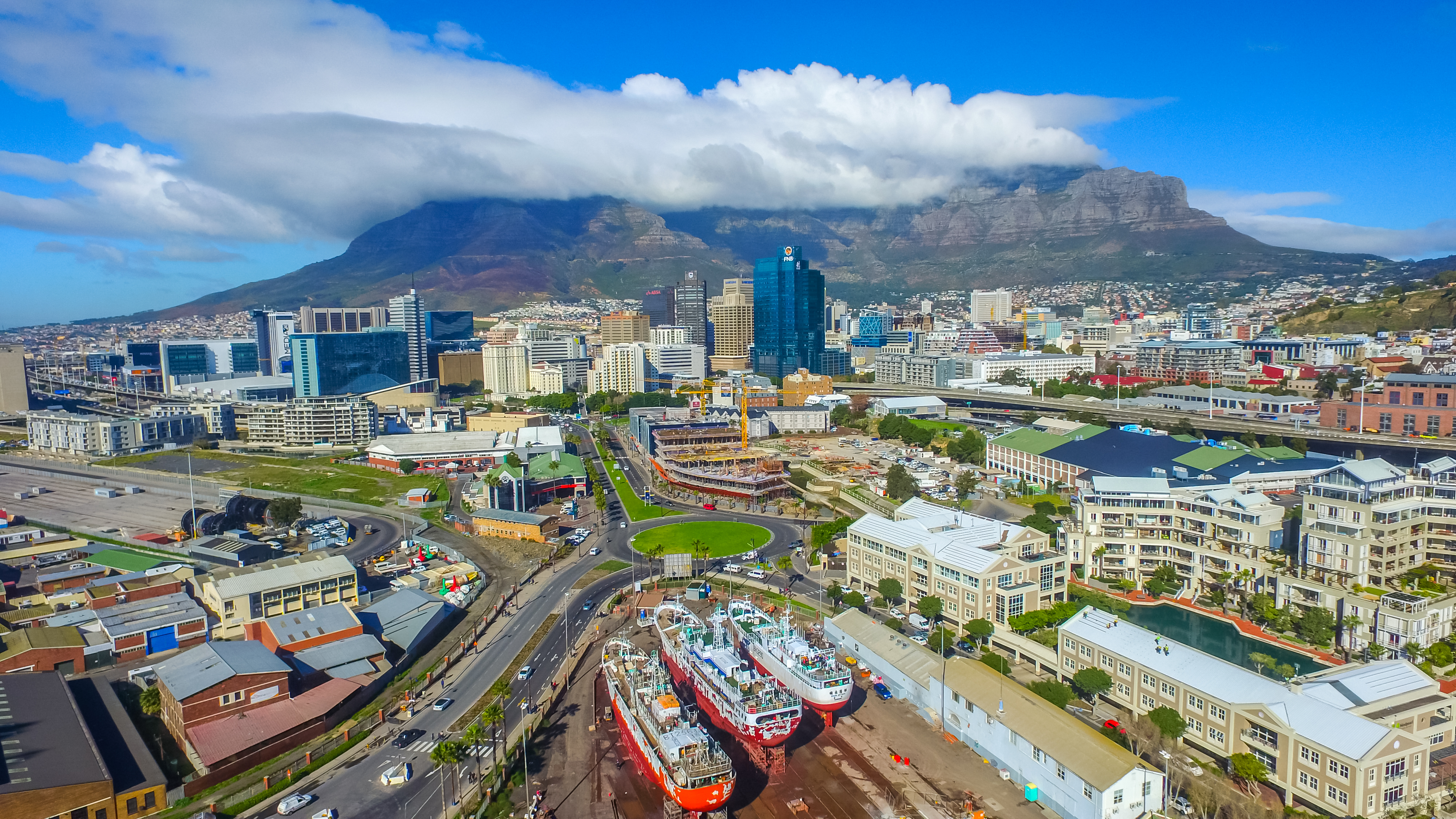
An aerial view of the city bowl from the harbour with Table Mountain in the background

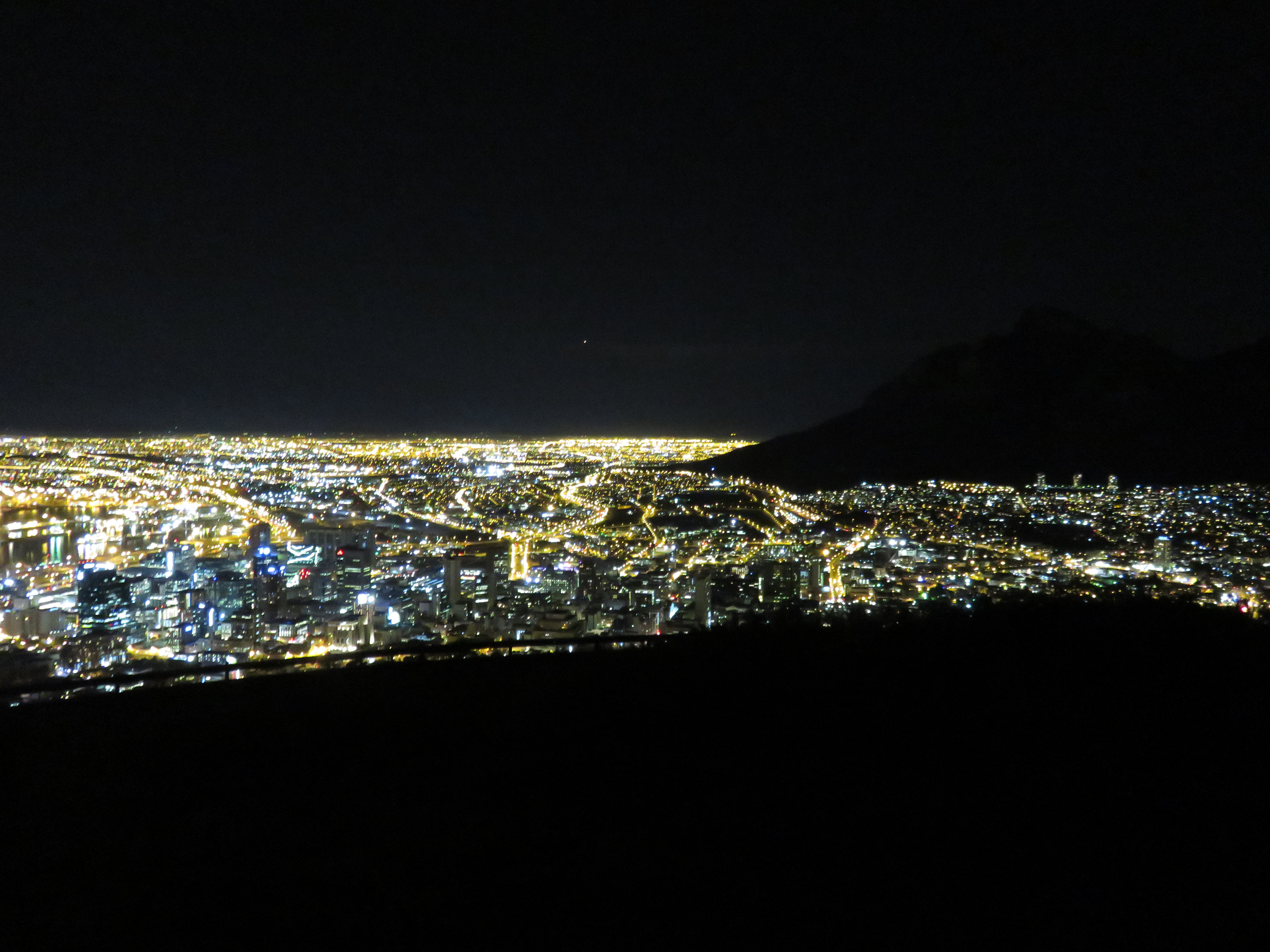
City Bowl from Signal Hill at night

City Bowl from the M3 freeway
