= Cape Town CBD =

Suburb of Cape Town, South Africa

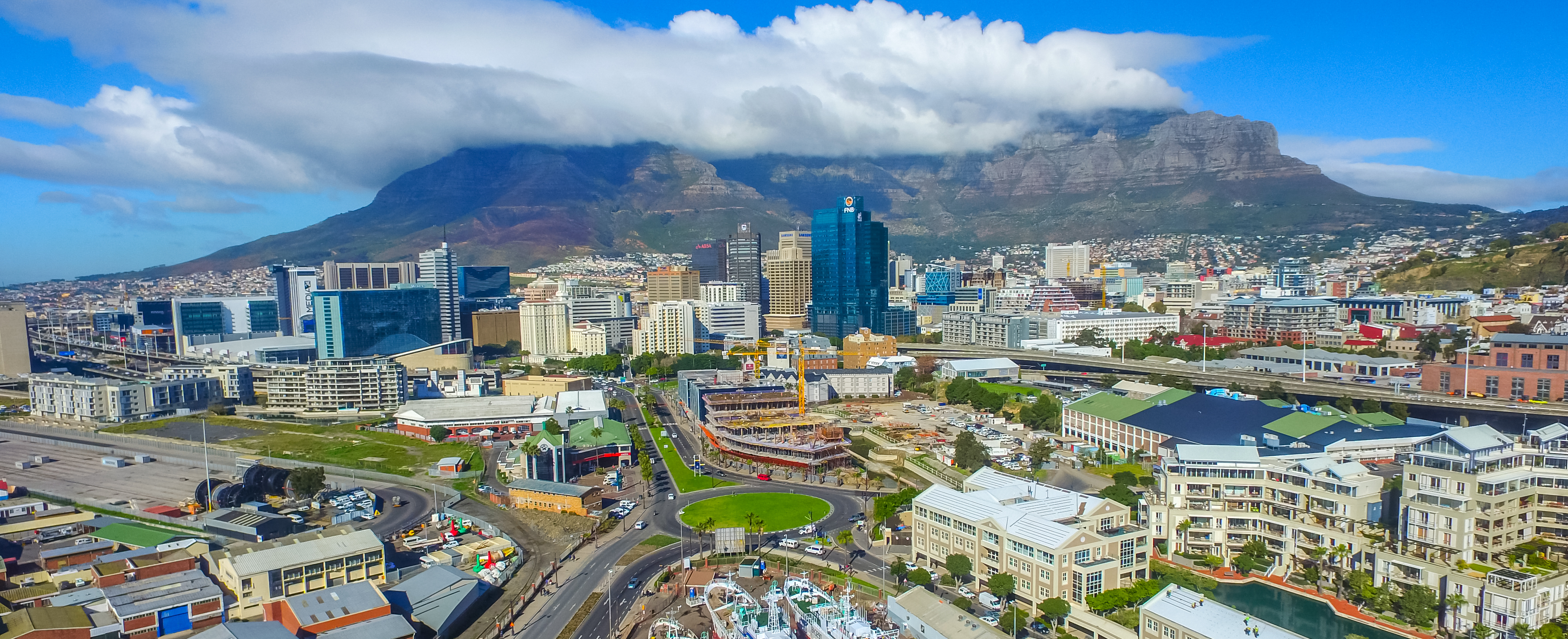
- Cape Town CBD in the background, with the blue Portside Tower in the center - the city's tallest building

- Location within Western Cape Location within South Africa
- Coordinates: 33°55′17″S 18°25′13″E
- Country: South Africa
- Province: Western Cape
- Municipality: City of Cape Town

Area
  - Total: 2.58 km^{2} (1.00 sq mi)

Population (2011)
  - Total: 5,286
  - Density: 2,050/km^{2} (5,310/sq mi)

Racial makeup (2011)
  - Black African: 49.5%
  - White: 28%
  - Coloured: 12.6%
  - Indian/Asian: 4%
  - Other: 5.9%

First languages (2011)
  - English: 58.5%
  - Afrikaans: 16.4%
  - Xhosa: 4.6%
  - Zulu: 1.7%
  - Other: 18.8%
- Time zone: UTC+2 (SAST)
- Postal code (street): 8001
- Area code: 021

Cape Town CBD (sometimes referred to as Cape Town Central City or City Centre) is the central business district of Cape Town, and the economic centre of the city.

The CBD sits beneath Table Mountain, and alongside the Port of Cape Town. The N1 freeway connects the CBD with communities to the east and north-east (the Northern Suburbs) (via the M5 and N7) while the N2 and M3 freeways link the CBD with communities to the south-east (the Southern Suburbs).

Being the economic centre of the city, the CBD houses the headquarters of many large South African and multinational corporations.

The CBD is home to numerous tourist attractions and local amenities. The area is also traveled through in order to get from the freeways into the V&A Waterfront, and to approach Table Mountain from the front.

Unlike many other CBDs in South African metropolitan areas, Cape Town CBD is considered clean and safe, and has been well-maintained in terms of infrastructure. Numerous public-private partnerships exist to keep the CBD a desirable place to be, including the Cape Town Partnership and Cape Town Central City Improvement District (CCID).

In recent years, billions of rands of foreign investment has flowed into Cape Town CBD, and numerous businesses have moved employees, and their headquarters, from other South African CBDs into Cape Town's. The CBD is also a major destination for tourists, and it had its busiest year for tourism to date in 2024.

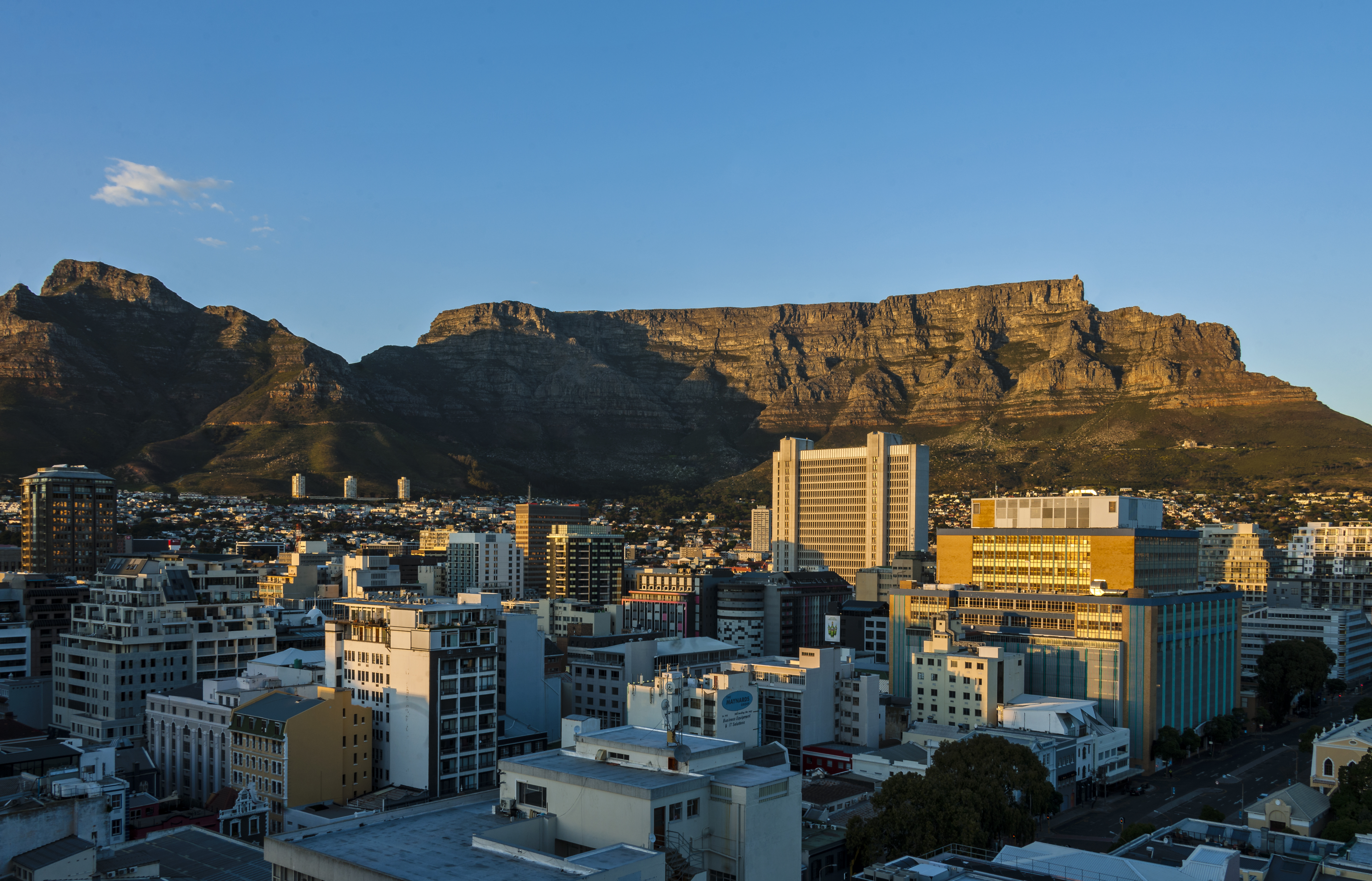
Cape Town CBD and Table Mountain at dawn

== Geography ==
Cape Town CBD is in the City Bowl region of the city, positioned between the Port of Cape Town and Table Mountain to the east and west, and between De Waterkant and Bo-Kaap in the north, and District Six to the south.

The CBD sits roughly between Buitengracht Street on its northern border, and Buitenkant Street on its southern end. Orange Street runs along the CBD's western side, forming a border between it and Gardens. To the CBD's east is Nelson Mandela Boulevard.

Cape Town CBD is approximately 2 km away from the V&A Waterfront, 20 km from the Cape Town International Airport, 10 km from the Century City commercial node, and 8 km from the popular beaches along the coastline of Camps Bay.

== Transit ==
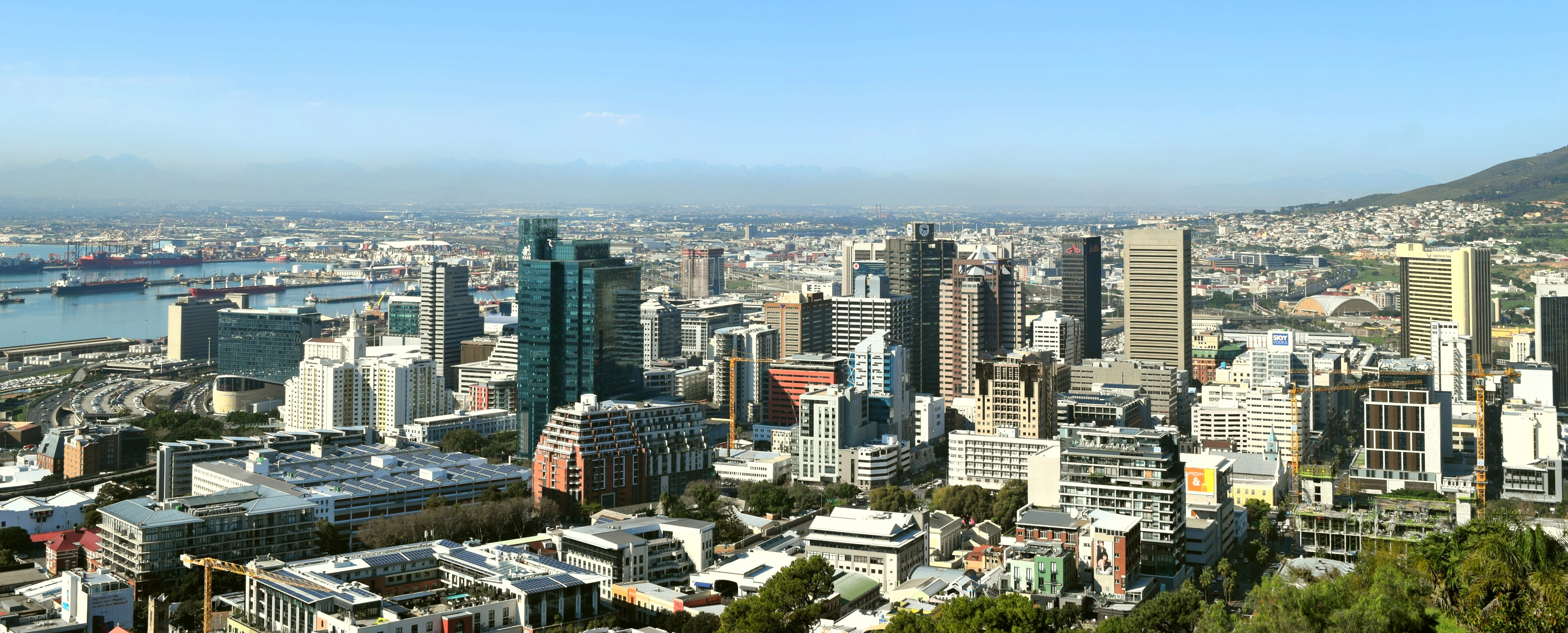
Cape Town CBD, with its feeder freeways to the left, and the Port of Cape Town behind them

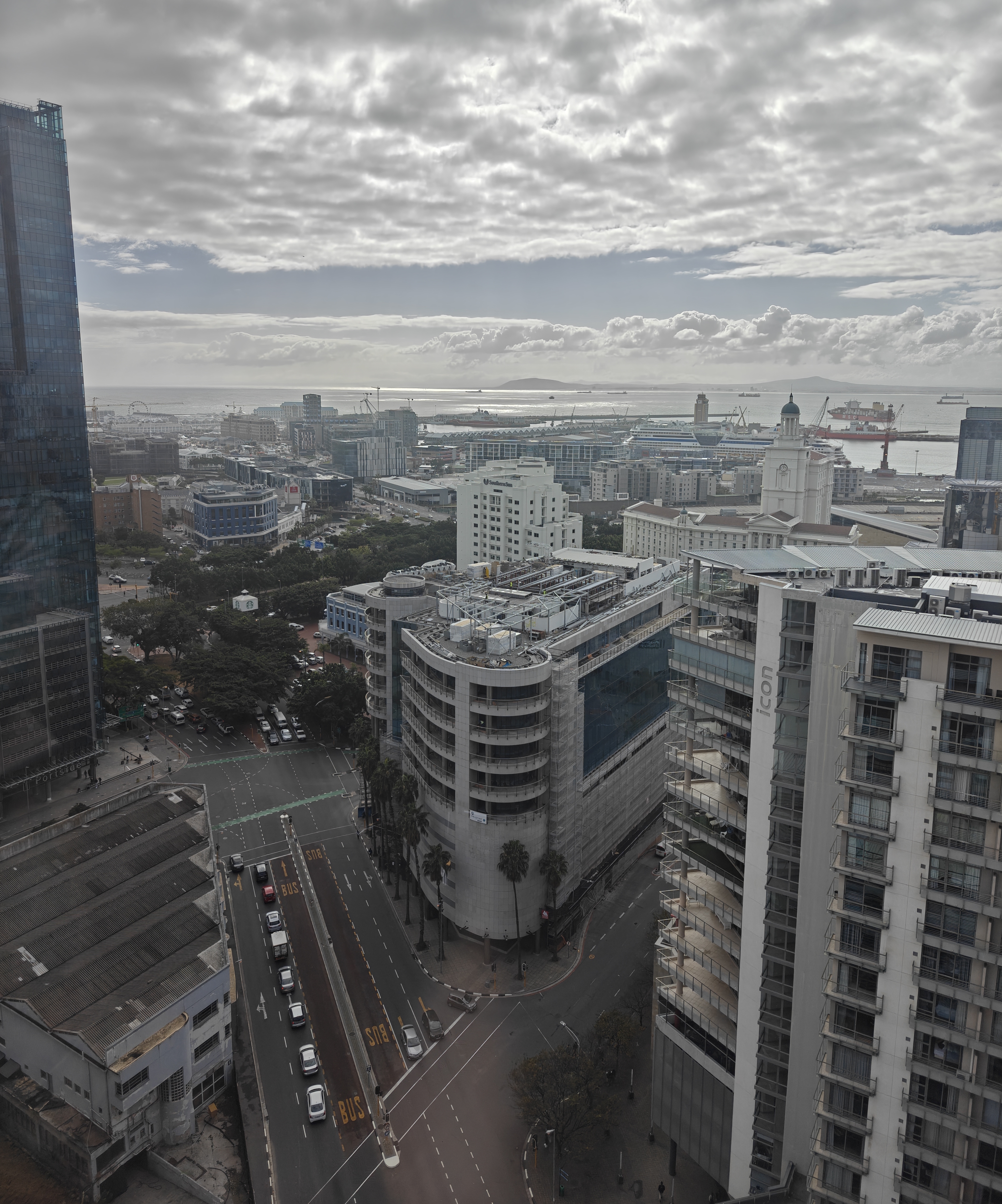
Part of the eastern side of Cape Town CBD, showing roads, green cycle lanes, and red bus lanes

The CBD is served by the MyCiTi bus rapid transit (BRT) system. Within the CBD are 21 BRT stations, the busiest of which are Civic Center, Adderley, Riebeek, Thibault Square, Darling, Groote Kerk, Castle, and Strand. As in other suburbs, the CBD features dedicated BRT lanes, painted red. Approximately 2.62 million people boarded MyCiTi buses in the CBD in 2022.

Metrorail trains terminate at Cape Town Station (the city's largest station), and the CBD also has metered taxis as a transit option. Numerous major roads feed the CBD, including the M3 and M5 freeways (via the N1 and N2 national highways), Kloof Nek Road, Beach Road, and the M4.

Main roads traversing the city include Adderley, Heerengracht, Buitengracht, Buitenkant, Strand, Longmarket Roeland, Darling, Riebeek, Newmarket, Kloof, Long, Wale, and Bree Streets.

There are an estimated 7,500 public parking spaces in the CBD, some of which are in access-controlled buildings, while others are free and on the roadside or on surface lots.

The CBD also features dedicated cycle lanes, painted green. Certain CBD cycle routes, such as those down a segment of Bree Street, have undergone infrastructure enhancement pilots, whereby safety bollards and kerbs have been installed.

Cycle routes in the CBD connect the area to the apex of Beach Road in the north, to Queen's Beach in Sea Point to the west, to the southern extent of Blaauwberg Nature Reserve in Big Bay to the east, and to Rosebank in the south.

CBD cycle lanes are part of the City of Cape Town's expanding non-motorized transport (NMT) routes, which run along roads to link the CBD to Table View, and also run alongside MyCiTi bus routes. One goal of the NMT is to enable easy access to, and thereby enhance the integration of, Cape Town's public transport connections, like buses and trains. CBD cycle lanes form part of the broader network of commuter, recreational, and offroad cycle routes around Cape Town.

Bree, Wale, Strand, and Shortmarket Streets in the CBD are car-free on Sundays. This pedestrian-only initiative began during Transportation Month, in October 2024. The idea behind the initiative is that Capetonians have an opportunity to reclaim public space, and enjoy a more pedestrian-friendly city.

== Commerce ==
The Cape Town International Convention Centre (CTICC), at the end of Nelson Mandela Boulevard

Cape Town CBD constitutes a significant portion of the city's overall economy.

Situated in the CBD are the headquarters and regional offices of many major South African and foreign companies, including some of South Africa's largest companies by annual revenue. Companies with headquarters or offices in the CBD include Standard Bank, Investec, First National Bank, Naspers, ENSafrica, KPMG, Cape Union Mart, Clicks, TFG Limited, Sweepsouth, Media24, Takealot, Truworths, Van Der Merwe Miszewski Architects, and Woolworths.

Numerous large hotels are situated throughout the CBD, serving Cape Town's tourists and business visitors. These include the Southern Sun Cape Sun, the Westin Cape Town, Mandela Rhodes Place, The Capital 15 On Orange, the Holiday Inn Express Cape Town City Centre, Park Inn, The Rockefeller Hotel & Residences, Southern Sun The Cullinan, the Radisson Cape Town Foreshore, the Hyatt Regency, the Taj Cape Town, and the Capetonian.

The top 10 sectors of business in the CBD are, in descending order, retail; legal; medical; finance and banking; food; architecture and engineering; coffeehouses; tech; communications; and general corporates.

Cape Town CBD is considered South Africa's most economically successful and stable, continuing to show significant growth. As of 2023, there were 3,116 entities doing business in the CBD alone. The number continues to grow, and the 2023 total was an increase of 6% since 2022.

1,243 of those businesses were retail and entertainment entities, including bakeries, spas, art galleries, bookstores, electronics retailers, printing shops, restaurants, specialty stores, sporting goods stores, clothing stores, cafes, and grocery stores. In the same year, the CBD was home to 106 tech companies, 19 coworking spaces, 43 art studios, around 190 finance and banking firms, around 700 law firms, around 250 medical practices, around 100 architecture and engineering firms.

Cape Town CBD has undergone significant revitalization in recent years, due in part to successful public-private partnerships, as well as business investments. Other contributing factors are well-planned infrastructure and effective governance.

The CBD has just over 1 million square meters of commercial space, and around 270,000 square meters of retail space. Vacancy rates are low, with fourth quarter 2022 rates at 13.3% and 4.5% respectively. Average rental costs for office space are between approximately R100 and R200 per square meter, depending on the grade, and the CBD holds around 40% of the City of Cape Town's total office space.

Adderley Street was one of the first major roads to be built in the CBD, and remains as the main street of the suburb. Partway down the street, in the Foreshore area, Adderley becomes Heerengracht Street - the old main street in the CBD.

The 15 tallest buildings in Cape Town are located within the CBD area. The tallest is Portside Tower, which is located on Buitengracht Street and serves as the headquarters for major South African finance and investment corporation FNB, and its subsidiary, RMB.

The CBD is also home to the Cape Town International Convention Centre (CTICC) - a major conference venue for the African continent. The Convention Center is linked to the V&A Waterfront (specifically around the One & Only Hotel) by a manmade river.

== Housing ==
Perspectives high-rise condo building in Roeland Street, Cape Town CBD

Housing within the CBD is predominantly made up of condos and apartments of various sizes. The density in the CBD is one of the highest among Cape Town's suburbs. Major residential developments in the CBD include One Thibault, The Rockefeller at Harbor Place, 16 On Bree, Icon, St Martini Gardens, The Adderley, The Square, The Heriot, Stonehill Place, the Onyx, and Foreshore Place. The CCID stated that the median price for sectional title properties in the CBD in 2022 was R1.47 million.

In mid-2025, the average sale price of a property in Cape Town CBD was just under R2 million. The most common size for properties sold in the area was 1-bedroom, followed by 2-bedroom properties. The rent in mid-2025 for a 1-bedroom apartment in the area ranged from around R10,000 to R21,000 per month. Rent for a 2-bedroom apartment ranged from around R17,000 to R70,000 per month.

In September 2025, it was reported that the average rental for a studio apartment in the CBD was R15,850. This reflected an increase in rental prices for CBD studios of almost 30% year-on-year. At the same time, the average rental for a 2-bedroom CBD apartment was R28,630. Most 3-bedroom apartments were priced at around R56,000.

Cape Town residents wanting to stay in detached homes close to the CBD have options in the surrounding, predominantly residential areas of Gardens, Tamboerskloof, Oranjezicht, Higgovale, District Six, and Bo Kaap, as well as mixed-use suburbs like Sea Point and De Waterkant. A number of upmarket apartment buildings are located close to the CBD, in the suburb of Green Point.

In September 2024, the City of Cape Town proposed a new CBD spatial plan (which it opened for public comment), and stated that it expects up to 50,000 new CBD residents by 2040. The municipality is focusing on car-less streets that are dedicated to pedestrian and bicycle traffic, improved public transit, access to affordable housing, maintaining mixed-use spaces, preserving heritage areas, and adding additional public spaces for residents and visitors to enjoy. The City is aiming to make the CBD a more people-centered environment, and less car-focused, in support of potentially developing a car-free CBD.

In September 2025, there were approximately 7,000 residential units in Cape Town CBD, with developments for thousands more in progress.

== Leisure ==
Cape Town CBD is home to numerous well-known sightseeing, tourist, food, and leisure spots for locals. These include the Iziko South African Museum, the South African National Gallery, and the Castle of Good Hope.

Major theaters located in the CBD including the large format Artscape and the smaller District Six Homecoming Centre (formerly the Fugard).

Beside the Houses of Parliament in the CBD sits The Company's Garden, which is the oldest garden in South Africa, and a national heritage site.

== Property development ==
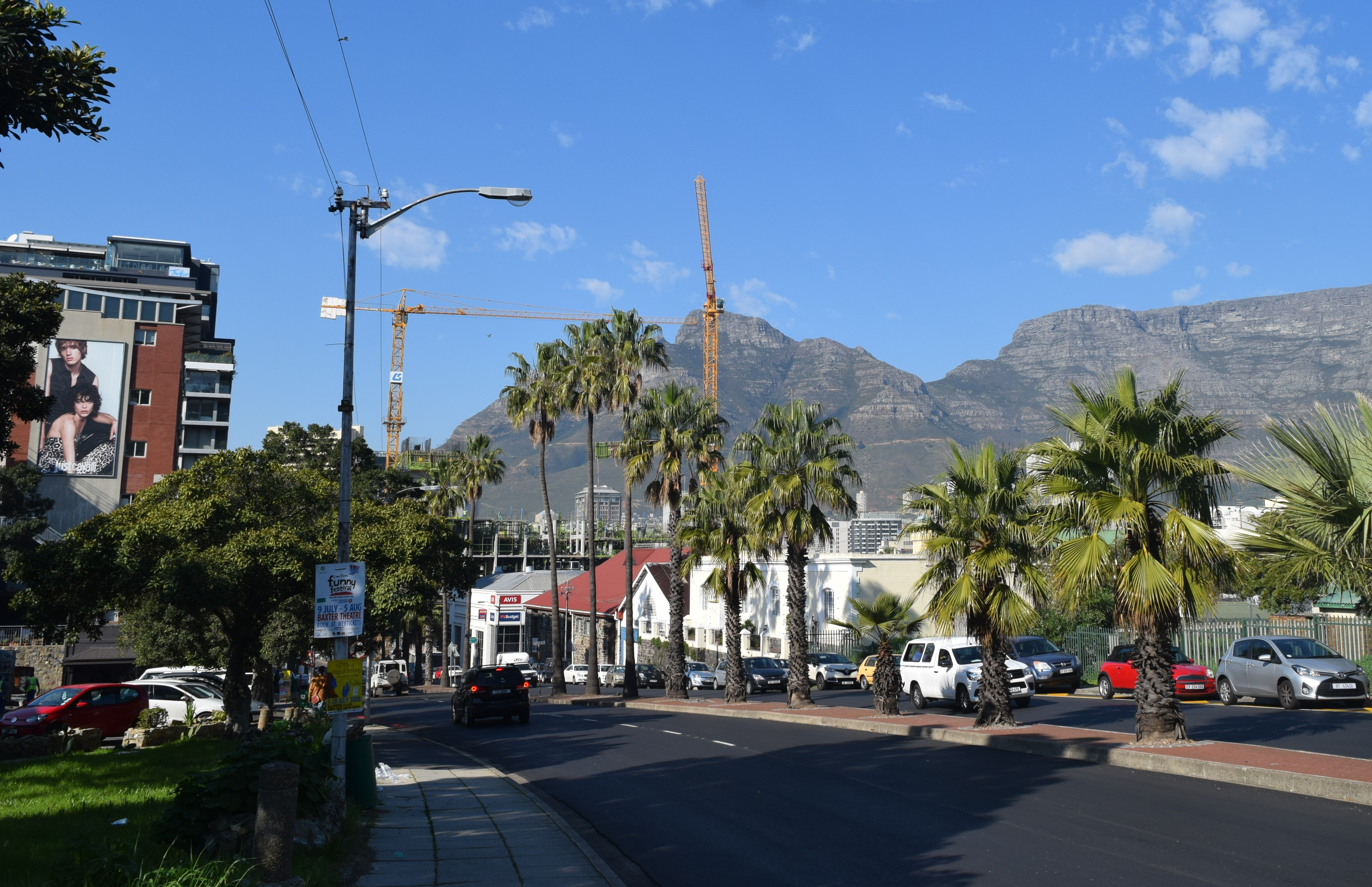
Cranes for property development, stationed in Cape Town CBD

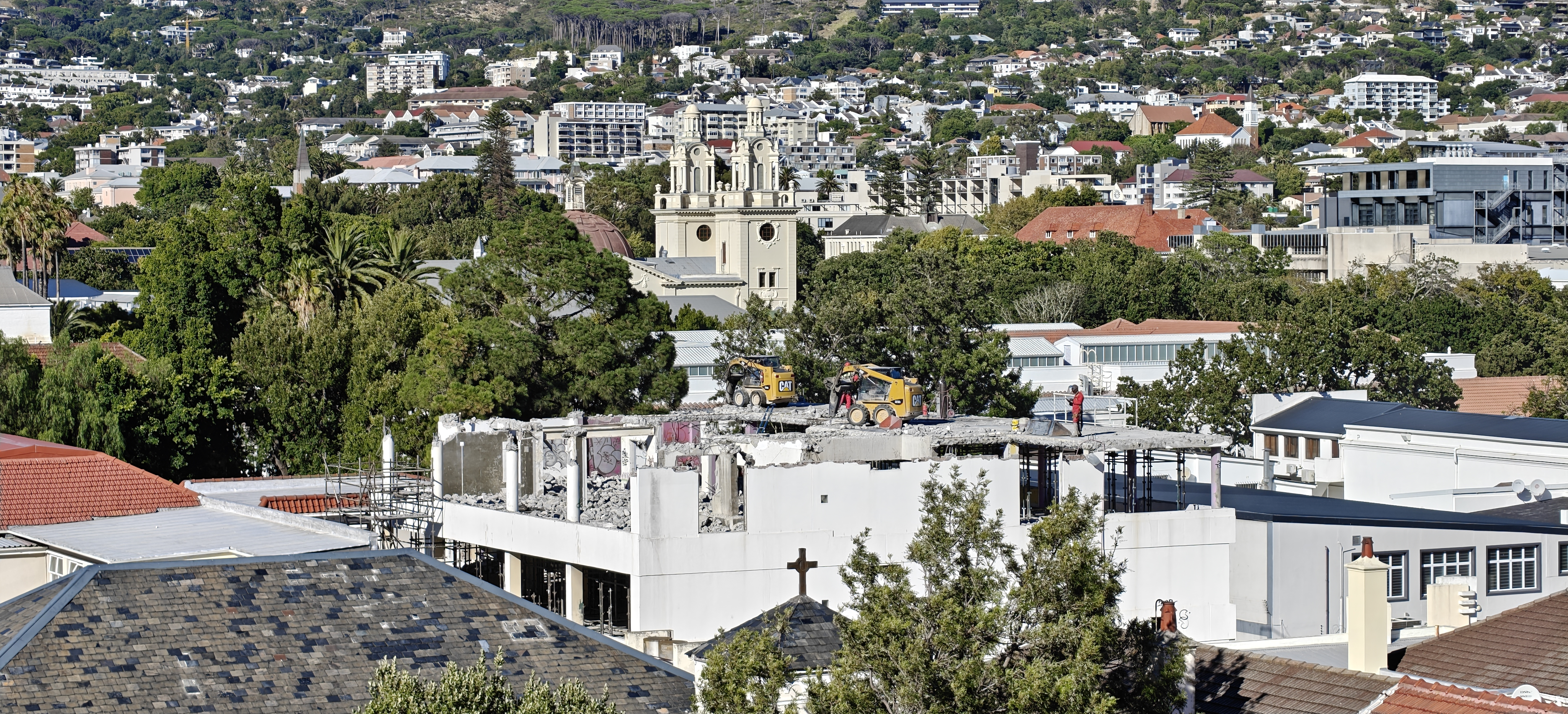
Construction work on a building in the CBD

The CBD is the site of many of the city's new high-cost, high-density property developments. While land in the CBD is scarce and expensive, it is considered prime real estate, for both commercial and residential purposes, and commands high sales prices. This is due to a number of factors, including being located amongst many other businesses, close to one of the city's main population centers, close to tourist attractions, and along major transit routes.

Confidence in the investment potential of the Cape Town CBD is high. The CBD's economy is, in part, driven by property development. The CCID's "State of Cape Town Central City Report", published in 2024, stated that 30 property developments or redevelopments were recorded in the CBD in 2023. Of these properties, 9 had already been completed, 8 were under construction, 10 were in the planning phase, and 3 were proposed. 12 out of the 30 properties were residential builds.

In 2024 alone, property development in the CBD was worth a combined R9.03 billion - a significant increase from the R7.28 billion in 2023, and the R3.73 billion in 2022. The CCID's report further stated that Cape Town CBD showed economic stability and growth, and that business owners were seeking to invest the area, as it was South Africa’s most economically successful CBD.

In recent years, the CBD has seen a large number of mixed-use projects reshaping the area's skyline and its residents' experiences of the suburb. The definition of mixed-use developments for the area is also evolving. No longer does it mean merely combining different functions into a building, but rather a true integration of residential, commercial, and retail. This diversification is appealing to investors who want to ensure their properties are protected from market fluctuations.

A decrease in office space as a result of residents working from home has resulted in numerous buildings being converted from single-use (commercial) spaces to mixed-use ones. Examples from 2023 are the One Thibault building being converted, at a cost of R200 million and The Barracks, costing R150 million. In early 2024, The Rubik was completed at a cost of R600 million, and features residential units, commercial and retail space, and office space.

The concept of the "15-minute city" is at the center of the growing trend in mixed-use development in Cape Town CBD. The concept relates to designing a city of integration and convenience, where the likes of work, education, medical care, and shopping facilities are all located within a 15-minute walk or cycle from residents' homes.

Cape Town CBD has also seen an increase in "green developments". New builds and renovations have trended more towards sustainability and environmental friendliness in recent years. These properties may incorporate elements such as gardens, low carbon emissions or net zero targets, energy and water conservation, and the repurposing of previously unused space to maximize building output.

== Recognition ==
Cape Town CBD has been described by international urban development professionals as a global role model for urban revitalization.

In October 2025, Cape Town CBD hosted the International Downtown Association (IDA) World Towns Leadership Summit. During the event, the CBD received recognition for its unique public-private partnership model, which has reversed urban decay and attracted major investment. Recognition was also given to Cape Town CBD's assisting vulnerable members of society to transform their lives, and contribute constructively towards the economic node.

The city further received praise for its being a true mixed-use environment, a tech hub, proactive safety measures, cleanliness, and outdoor, coastal culture. Cape Town CBD was generally regarded as welcoming, scenic, walkable, and possessing an attractive lifestyle.

== Governance ==
Cape Town CBD is home to both the Parliament of South Africa and the Western Cape Provincial Parliament, as well as the Cape Town Civic Centre, which houses the municipal government (City Council) and public servants for the city. The area is also home to Cape Town City Hall, which used to house the offices of the City of Cape Town (the municipal government).

Just next to the CBD, in Gardens, sits Leeuwenhof, the official residence of the Premier of the Western Cape. Over 23,000 government employees work in the CBD, and numerous government agencies, as well as 5 of South Africa's political parties, have offices in the area.

The CBD is represented by ward councilors Francine Higham of the Democratic Alliance (DA) for Ward 77, and Ian McMahon of the DA for Ward 115.

== Gallery ==
Images of Cape Town CBD
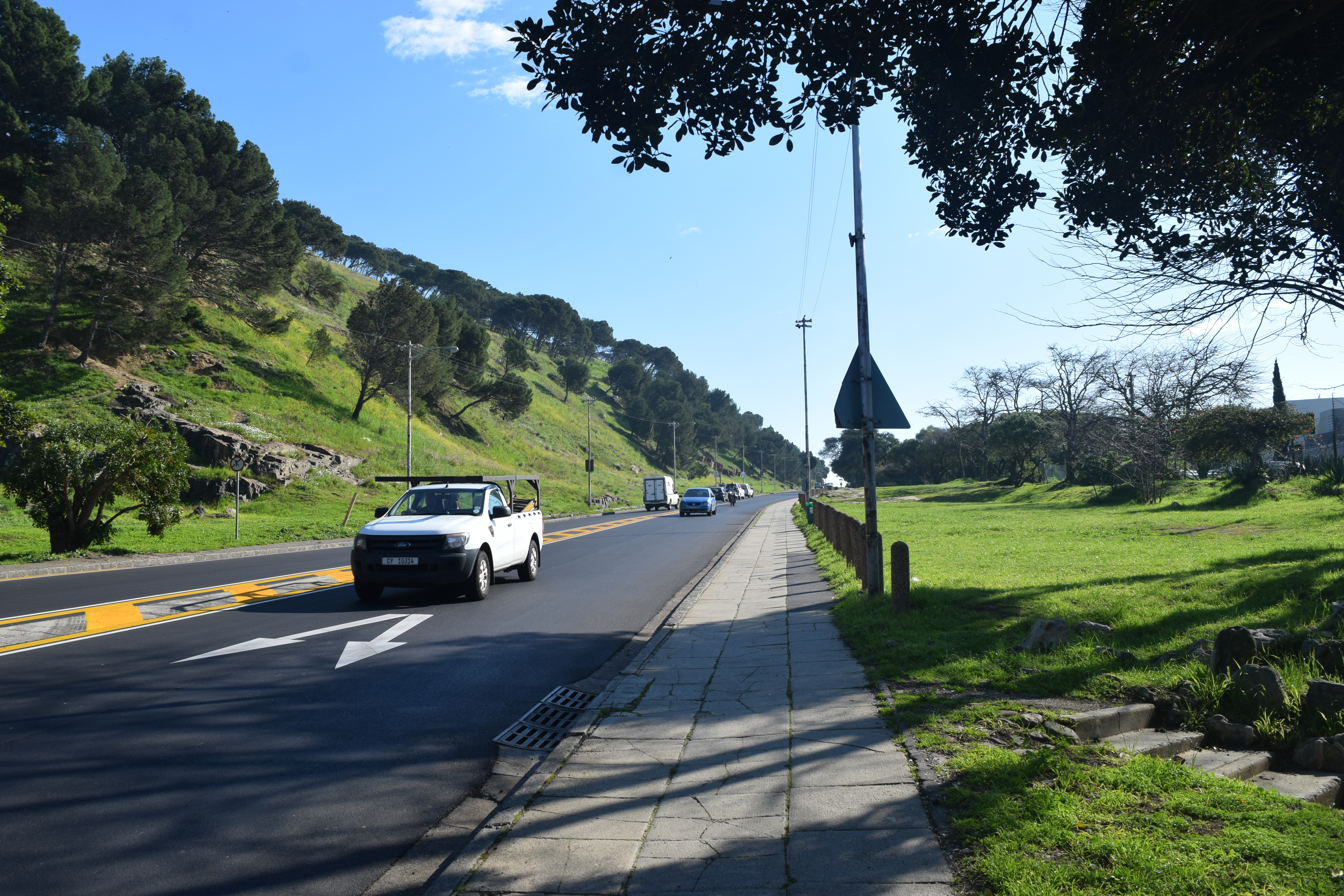
View towards Cape Town CBD, along Philip Kgosana Drive

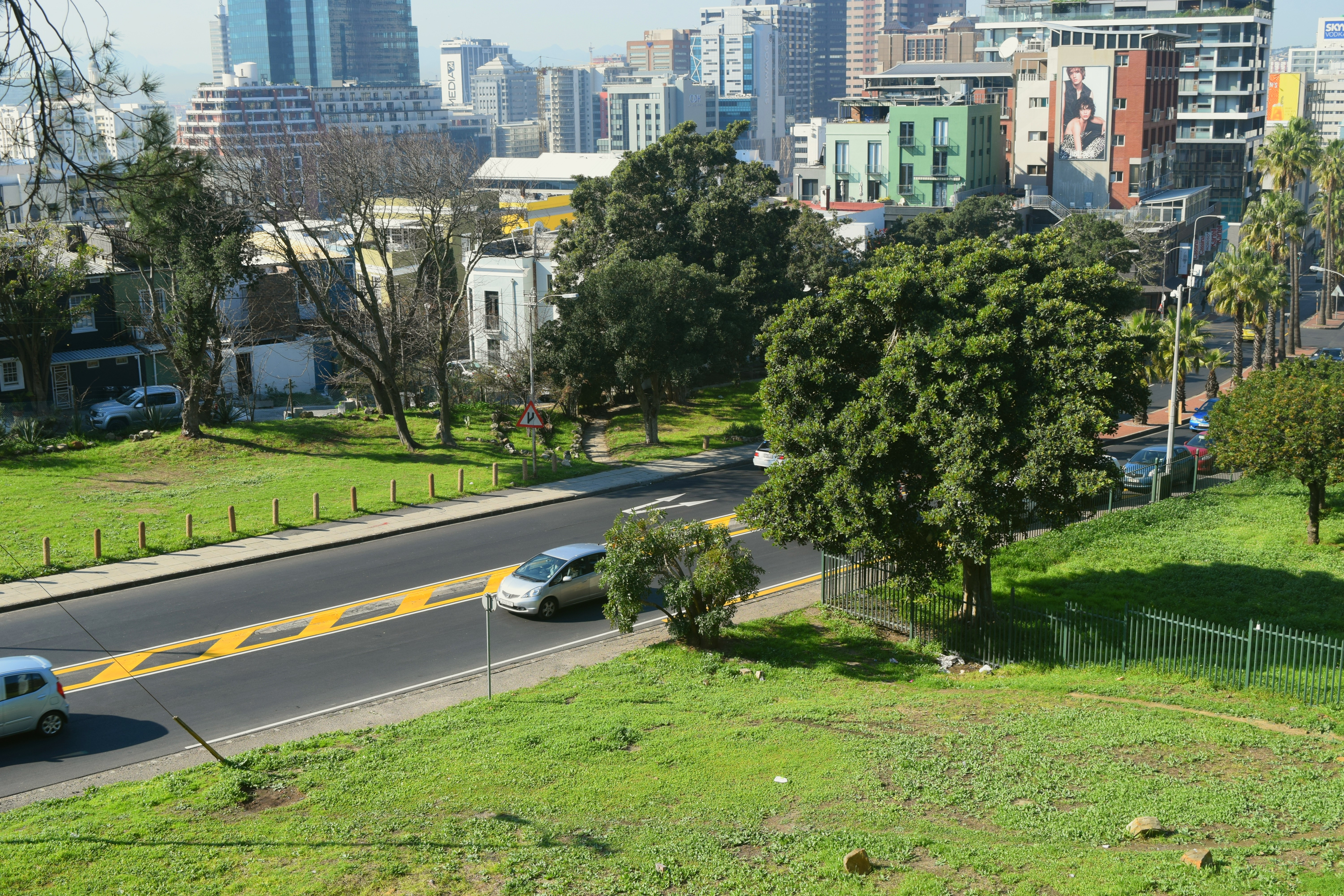
The CBD (behind), with De Waterkant in the middle, and Strand Street in the foreground

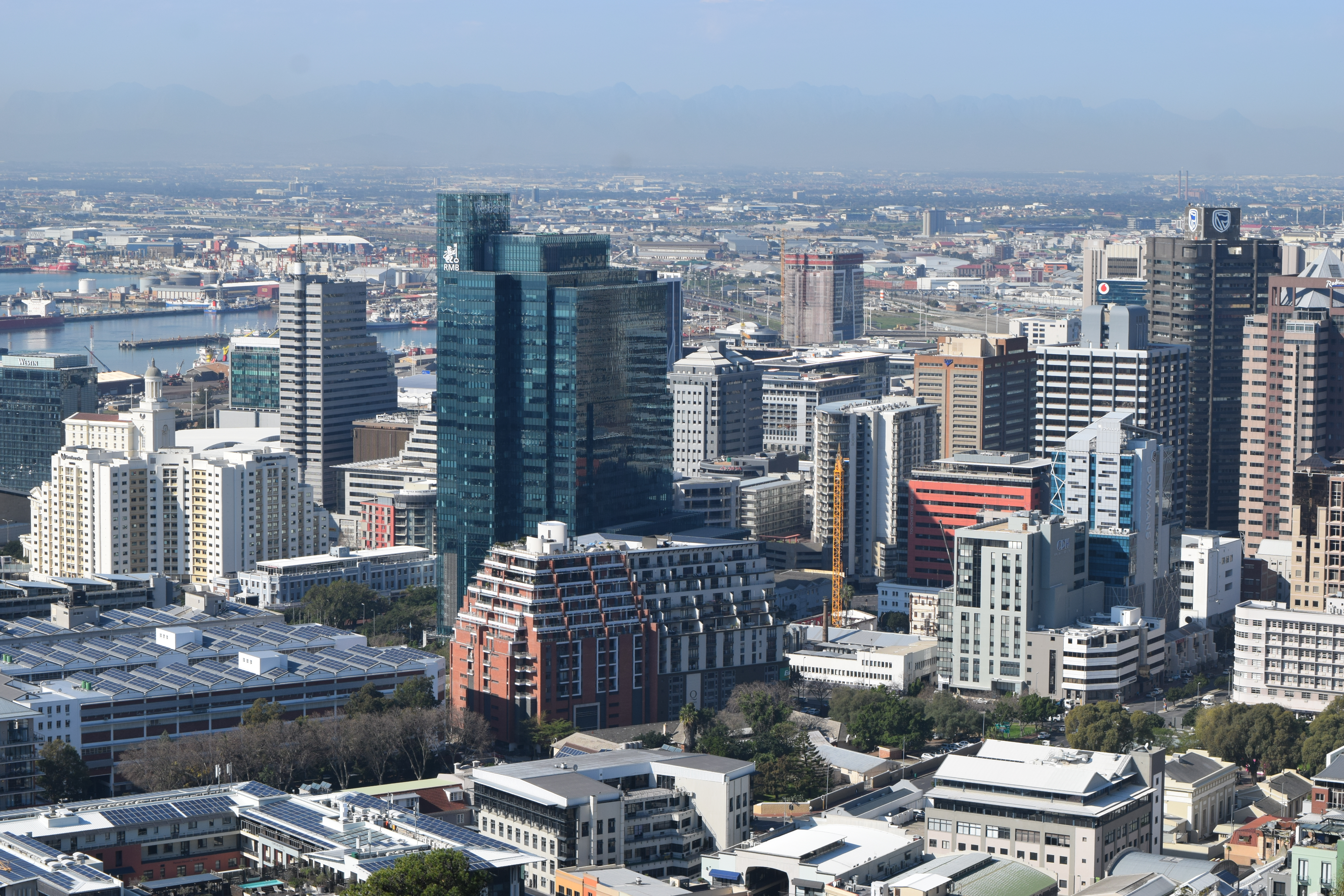
High-rise buildings in the center of the CBD

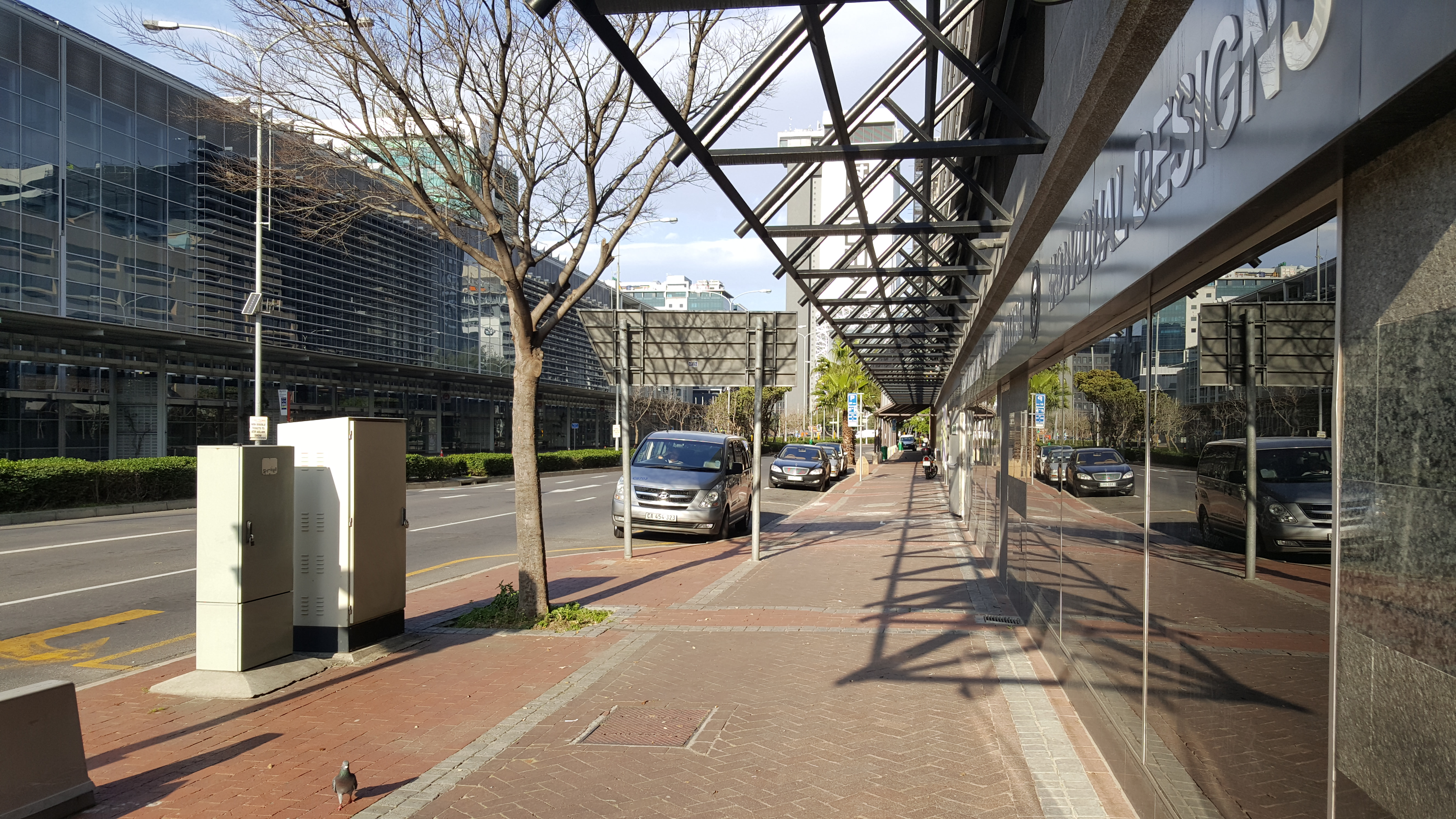
Lower Loop Street, opposite the entrance to the Cape Town International Convention Centre

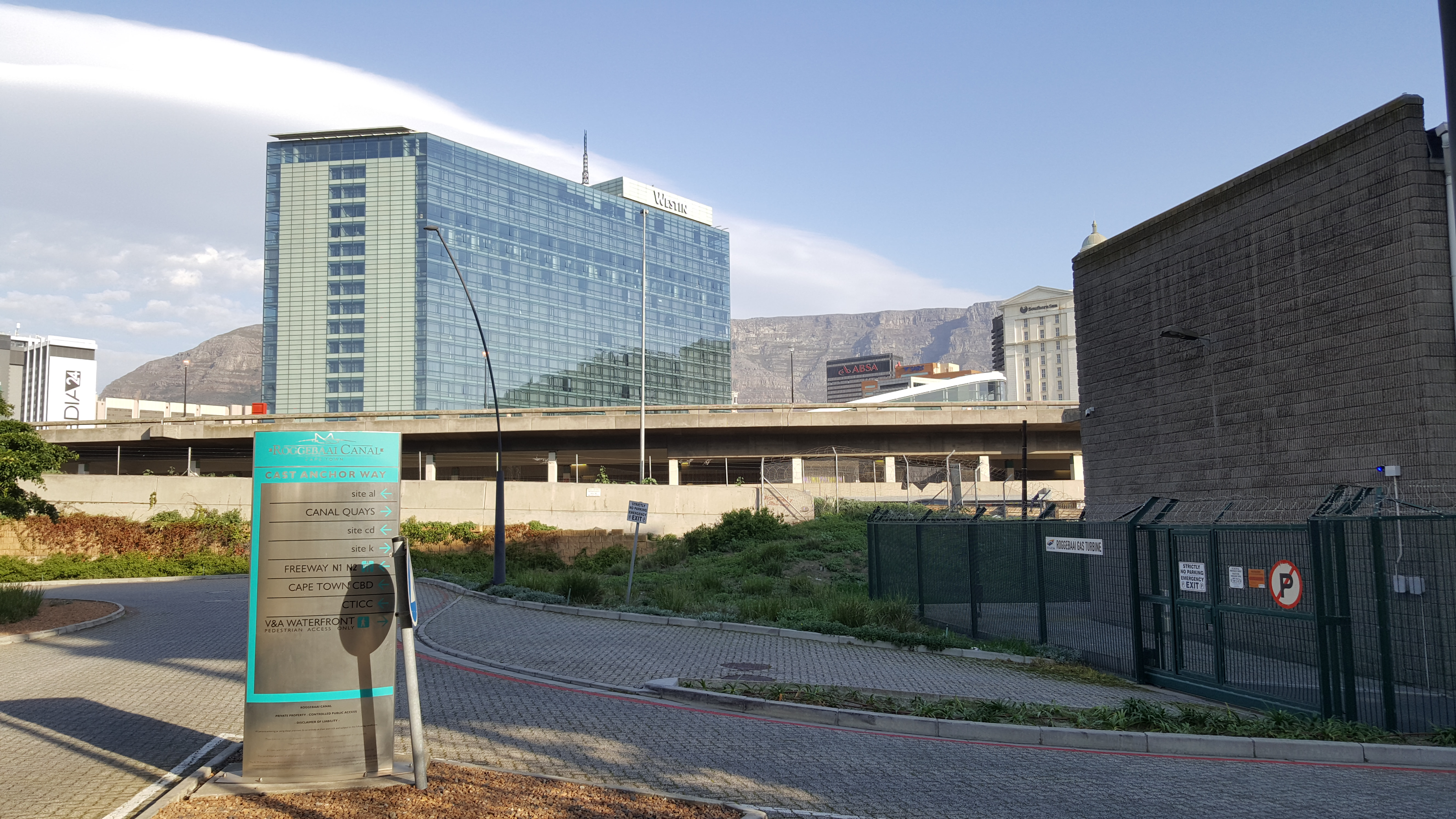
The Westin Cape Town hotel next to the aerial freeway leading into the CBD

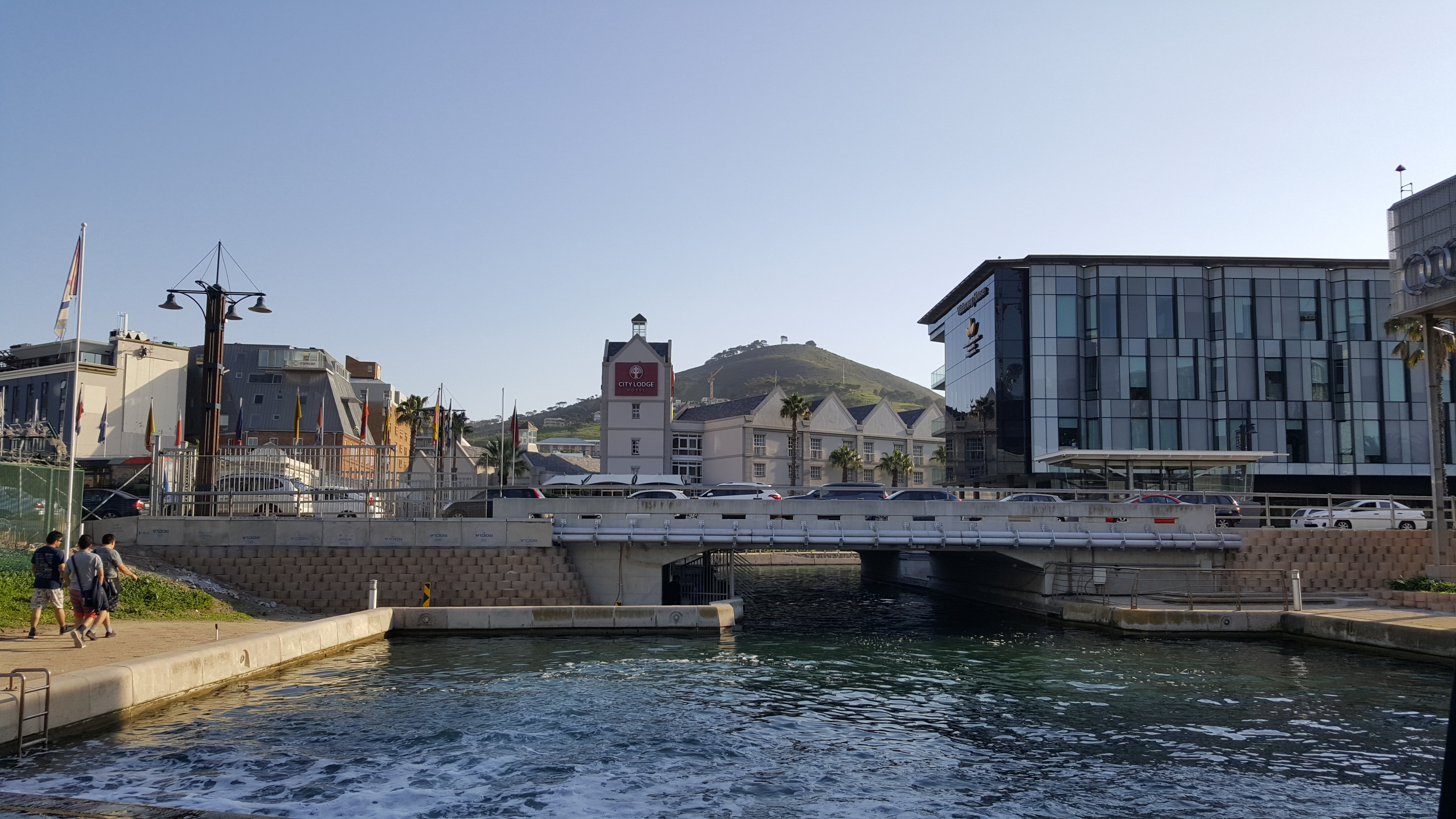
The border of the CBD and the V&A Waterfront, with Signal Hill in the background

Constructed in 2014, Portside Tower is the tallest building in the CBD, at 32 floors

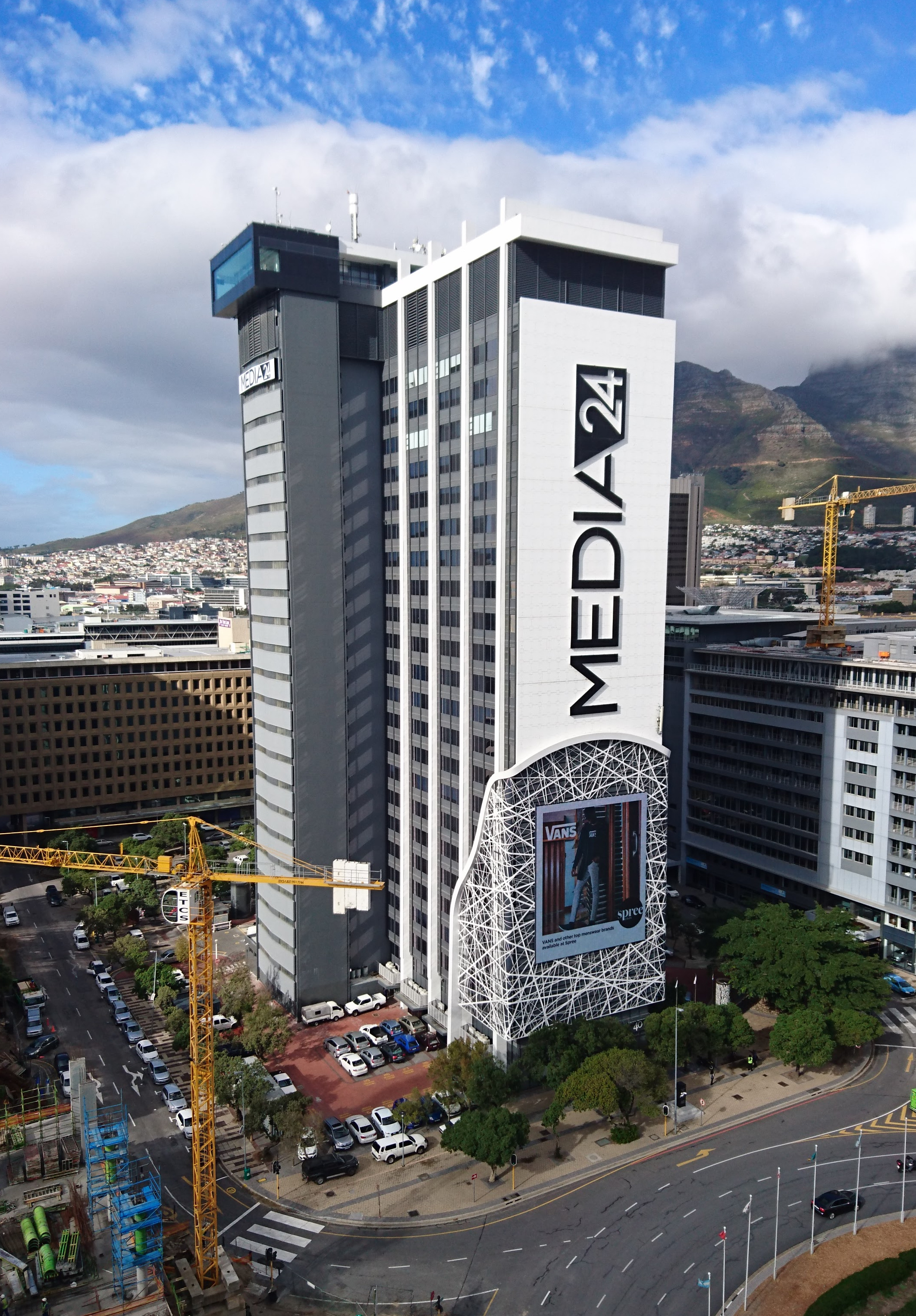
The Media24 Centre on the eastern border of the Foreshore region of the CBD, serves as the headquarters of mass media company Naspers

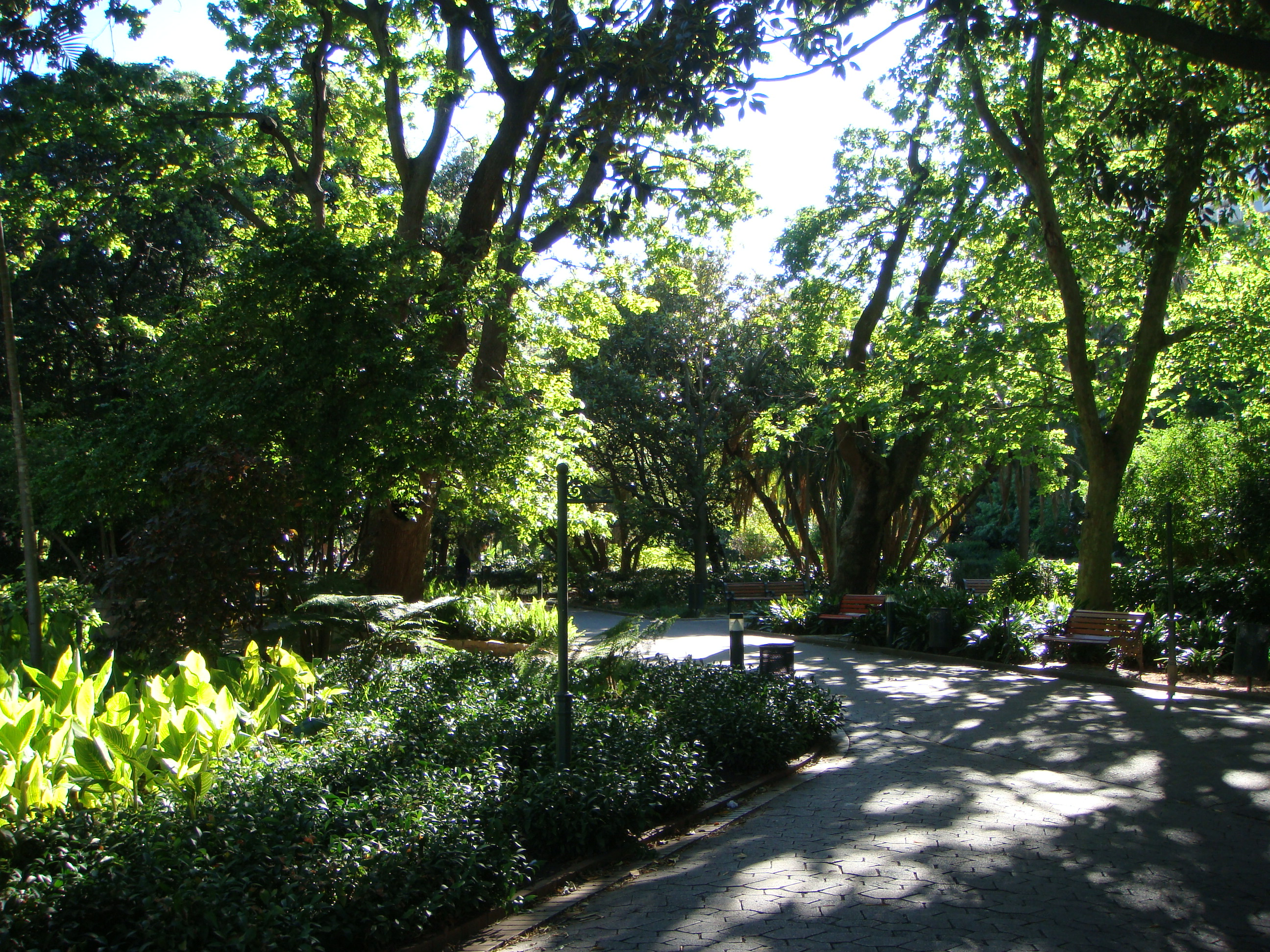
The Company's Garden, a large public park in the CBD, sits beside the Parliament of South Africa

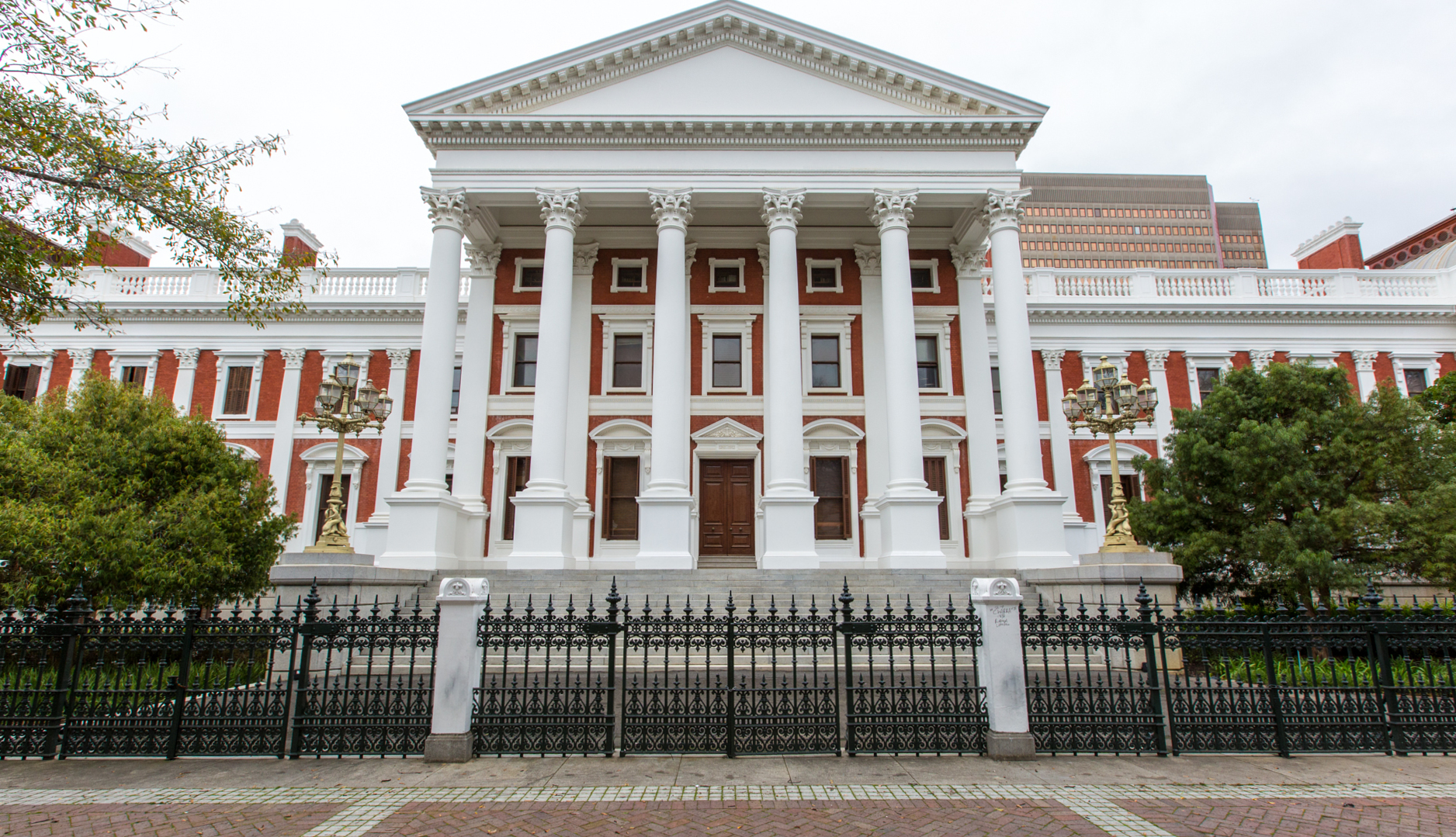
The main building of the Houses of Parliament, located at 50 Parliament Street

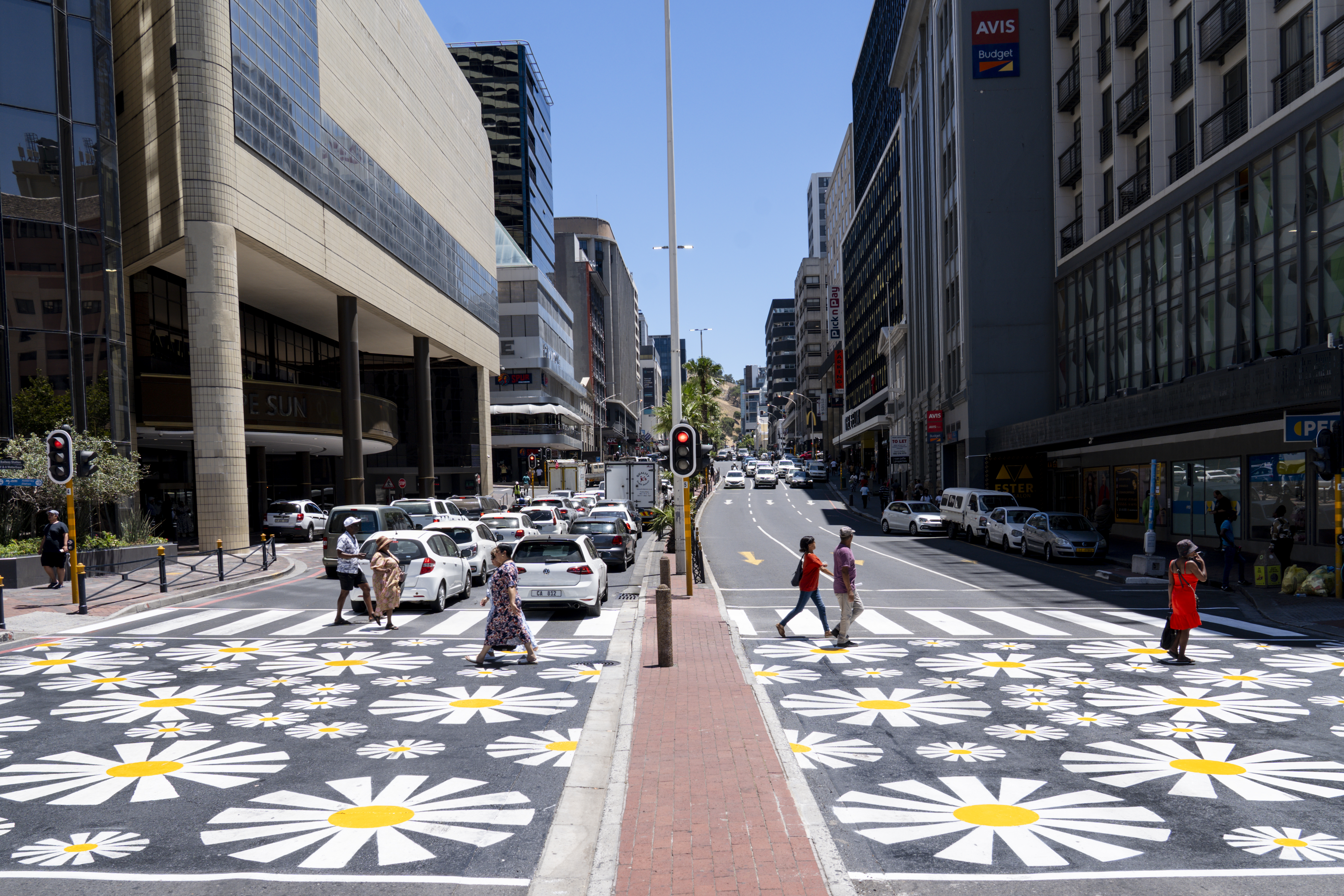
African daisy-styled pedestrian artwork crossing at the St. George's intersection in Strand Street, a major road in the CBD

== See also ==
- City Bowl
- Cape Town
