= Peach Payments =

South African fintech

- Type: Private
- Industry: Fintech
- Founded: 2012; 14 years ago
- Founder: Rahul Jain; Andreas Demleitner
- Headquarters: Cape Town, South Africa
- Area served: 10 countries in Africa (2026)
- Key people: Rahul Jain (CEO); Tejpal Bedi (MD)
- Services: Payment facilitation
- Number of employees: 175+ (2026)
- Website: peachpayments.com

Peach Payments is a South African fintech company and payment service provider. Founded in 2012, the company is headquartered in Cape Town.

Peach Payments facilitates online and in-store payments via its platform, supporting methods such as QR codes, cards, vouchers, and digital wallets. The company also offers business funding.

== History ==
Peach Payments was founded in 2012 by Rahul Jain and Andreas Demleitner.

In 2013, the company received approximately R9 million in seed funding from 88 mph, an investment firm focused on early stage startups.

One of the company's earliest merchant partners that allowed Peach Payments to grow was South African app-based, on-demand cleaning service Sweepsouth. The two partnered for payment facilitation in 2014.

In 2018, Peach Payments expanded into Kenya. This was followed by an entry into the Mauritian market in 2021.

The company had its first official round of VC funding in 2020, and received an undisclosed amount from Allan Gray and UW Ventures.

In 2021, Peach Payments had its second funding round. It received seed funding from Launch Africa Ventures, a venture capital fund focused on early stage investments. Existing investment partners Allan Gray and UW Ventures also provided funding.

In 2022, the company underwent a rebrand. That same year, its CEO and cofounder, Rahul Jain, won the IESE 40 Under 40 Best Entrepreneur Award.

In April 2023, the company secured approximately R567 million in Series A funding from Apis Partners, which the company said it planned to use to improve its service, and expand into new African markets. At the time, the company had seen a 650% increase in revenue since 2020, with an 80% increase in 2022 alone.

In February 2024, Peach acquired in-store payment technology from Dutch firm Exipay.

In July 2024, Peach Payments wholly acquired Cape Town-based software development company Operativa, for an undisclosed amount. The firm was acquired as a going concern, with its team fully integrated into Peach's own team, and Operativa's two cofounders becoming principal engineers at Peach. The team at Operativa had been working with Peach since 2022, to build some of the latter's payment systems. At the time of the acquisition, aside from the newly merged Operativa team, Peach Payments had around 150 employees.

In April 2025, Peach acquired Senegalese digital payment provider PayDunya for an undisclosed amount. At the time, PayDunya had 40 employees, operations in six West African countries, and processed 70,000 transactions per day. The deal increased Peach's total number of countries of operation to 12.

In August 2026, venture capital firm Launch Africa Ventures sold its secondary stake in Peach Payments to the 27four Nebula Fund. The Nebula Fund was established in May 2023, as an investment vehicle for tech companies.

== Operations ==
As of 2026, the company maintains an HQ in Cape Town, as well as offices in Johannesburg and Nairobi.

Investors in Peach Payments over its funding rounds have included Launch Africa, AgVenture, Umkhathi Wethu (UW Ventures), 88 mph, Apis Partners, and Allan Gray.

== See also ==
- Cape Town tech industry
- Banking in South Africa
- Economy of South Africa
