= Phuti Mahanyele =

South African business executive

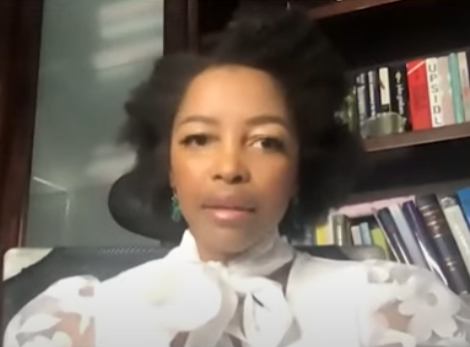

External videos
- These challenges that people see on the African continent exist everywhere in the world as well. Phuthi Mahanyele-Dabengwa – CEO, Shanduka
- If we are unable to tap into the talent that is locked within us ... we will not be able to deal with many of the issues that the world is facing. Phuthi Mahanyele-Dabengwa – Women's Leadership Conference 2012

Phuti Mahanyele-Dabengwa (born c. 1971) is a South African business executive currently working as the chief executive officer of Naspers South Africa.

She previously held the positions of co-founder and chief executive officer at Sigma Capital and CEO at the Shanduka Group. Mahanyele-Dabengwa was included in The Wall Street Journal list of the "Top 50 women in the world to watch in 2008", was recognized by Africa Investors as a "Leading African Woman in Business" in 2012, and named as ForbesWoman Africa "Business Woman of the Year" in 2014. The All Africa Business Leaders Awards (AABLA) named her “Business Woman of the Year” in 2019.

== Early life and education ==
Mahanyele-Dabengwa was born in Meadowlands, Soweto, South Africa. Her father, who died in 2012, grew up in a family of "10 or 11 siblings" and had to pay for her own schooling. Mahanyele-Dabengwa's mother died when she was 17 years old. In a 2013 interview, she spoke of her parents' commitment to her and her sister having the best education possible and the expectation that she would work in a commercial environment. After her mother's early death at age 42, Mahanyele has said that it was a lesson to her not to waste time or take it for granted.

She left Johannesburg, South Africa at age 17 to attend Douglass College at Rutgers University in the United States. She graduated with a bachelor's degree in Economics in 1993. In 1996 she earned an MBA from De Montfort University. In 2008, Mahanyele-Dabengwa completed Harvard University's Kennedy School of Government executive education program "Global Leadership and Public Policy for the 21st Century".

== Career ==
Mahanyele-Dabengwa joined Fieldstone Private Capital Group in New York City, an international investment banking firm specialising in infrastructure development. She later became vice president at Fieldstone in New York, and subsequently transferred to the firm's South Africa office. She then became head of Project Finance South Africa at the Development Bank of Southern Africa. Of her return to South Africa from a successful career in the United States, which some have seen as unusual, she said "where else in the world would it make sense for a black woman to be?"

She joined Shanduka Energy in 2004 as managing director and later became chief executive officer of Shanduka Group which was founded and chaired by South African President, Cyril Ramaphosa. In 2016, Mahanyele-Dabengwa resigned from Shanduka Group and founded Sigma Capital.

In July 2019, Mahanyele-Dabengwa was appointed the CEO of Naspers South Africa, becoming its first black and first female chief executive.

== Leadership ==
In 2012, Mahanyele-Dabengwa spoke to the Women's Leadership Conference, asserting that a greater role for women in business was necessary, not only to rectify a social injustice but, more importantly, because there was "an economic and business imperative" to use the talents of women to solve the problems that the world faces.

Mahanyele-Dabengwa was selected as a Global Young Leader by the World Economic Forum in 2007. She is involved in the World Economic Forum's "Dignity Day" initiatives, and has been chairperson for Global Dignity for South Africa.

At the US-Africa Leaders Summit in Washington DC in 2014, Mahanyele-Dabengwa was the only African woman on a panel for “Expanding Opportunities: The New Era For Business In Africa”, moderated by former US President Bill Clinton.

She is an independent director of Vodacom and Discovery Insure.

She is a patron of the National Education Empowerment Trust (NEET).

== Other activities ==
=== Corporate boards ===
- Gold Fields, independent non-executive director of the Board of Directors (since 2018)
- Microsoft, member of the 4Afrika Advisory Council (since 2013)
- Comair, non-executive independent member of the Board of Directors (−2019)

=== Non-profit organizations ===
- University of Stellenbosch Business School, member of the Advisory Board

== Selected awards ==
- Forbes "Africa's 50 most powerful women"
- CNBC Africa’s All Africa Business Leaders "Woman of the Year Award"
- ForbesWoman Africa Business Woman of the Year Award, 2014
- "Distinguished Achievement" award by the Douglass Society, 2013
- Leading Africa Woman in Business. Africa Investors, 2012
- Rutgers Vision of Excellence Award. Rutgers University, 2011
- Most Influential Woman in Government and Business – Financial Services. 2009
- The Wall Street Journal list of the "Top 50 women in the world to watch in 2008"
- World Economic Forum, Global Young Leader, 2007
