= Cape Town CCID =

Nonprofit group maintaining and promoting Cape Town CBD

- Cape Town Central City Improvement District
- Nickname: The CCID
- Formation: 2000; 26 years ago
- Type: Registered nonprofit
- Registration no.: 1999/009132/08
- Purpose: Improving, maintaining, and promoting Cape Town CBD as an appealing place for residents, visitors, and businesses
- Region served: Cape Town CBD
- Services: Cleaning; Security; Pest control Roadway maintenance Graffiti removal Gardening; Stakeholder engagement
- Key people: Tasso Evangelinos (CEO); Rob Kane (Chairman)
- Main organ: Board
- Revenue: ▲ R114.23 million (2025)
- Expenses: ▲ R114.11 million (2025)
- Website: capetownccid.org

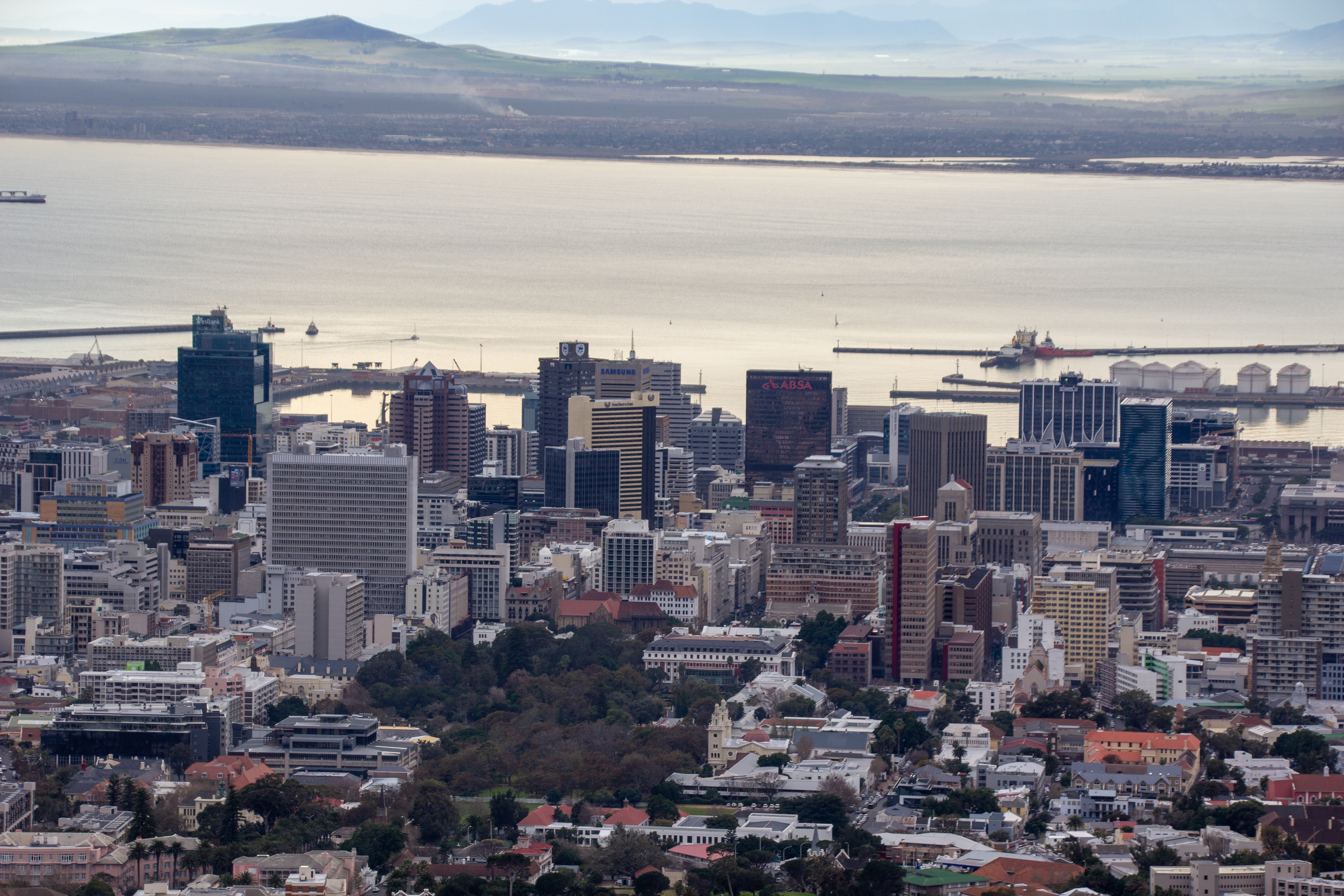
The CCID operates in Cape Town CBD, which is Cape Town's main economic hub

The Cape Town Central City Improvement District, commonly referred to as the CCID, is a nonprofit organization based in Cape Town, South Africa. It works to improve, maintain, and promote Cape Town CBD – the city's main economic hub.

The CCID's goal is to keep Cape Town CBD as an appealing place of residence, location for businesses to operate, and area for visitors (both locals and tourists) to enjoy. Thus, along with partners, the organization works to ensure that the CBD is a clean, safe, functional environment.

Founded in 2000, the CCID is headquartered in Cape Town CBD, and its 1.6km² area of operation is divided up into four regions - one around the Company's Garden and Parliament; one to the north of Adderley Street; one to the north of Buitenkant Street; and one in the Foreshore, above and below Heerengracht Street.

The CCID has been widely recognized as having played a major role in revitalizing and maintaining Cape Town CBD.

== History ==
In 1999, numerous Cape Town CBD property owners noted a significant degeneration of the CBD area, and decided to form the Cape Town Partnership, which successfully created a City Improvement District (CID) for their area. The goal was to improve the safety, cleanliness, and general appeal of Cape Town CBD. In 2000, the Cape Town Partnership became the Cape Town Central City Improvement District (CCID).

In its 2025 Annual Report, the CCID celebrated 25 years of operation, and having created a climate of stability and growth in Cape Town CBD. The organization noted the fact that the CBD was thriving as a residential, commercial, and leisure space, in contrast to other, failing CBDs around the world. The CCID further noted Cape Town CBD being regarded as the most appealing CBD in South Africa, and noted exceptionally high investor confidence in Cape Town CBD, a 2022 total nominal property value in the CBD of R42.5 billion, continued economic growth, and a reduction in crime.

In the same year, Cape Town Mayor Geordin Hill-Lewis and Deputy Mayor Eddie Andrews thanked the CCID for its collaborative work with partners, resulting in a cleaner, safer CBD, with a global reputation for its livability.

In October 2025, the CCID hosted the International Downtown Association (IDA) World Towns Leadership Summit, along with the Voortrekker Road Corridor Improvement District and the Greater Tygerberg Partnership. At the event, Cape Town CBD was described as a "global role model for urban revitalization", a "huge hub for tech and business", and a "world-class city center that combines global relevance with a character that is uniquely its own, merging the vibrancy of a major business hub with a lifestyle appeal that offers a rare blend of outdoor and coastal culture".

== Operations ==
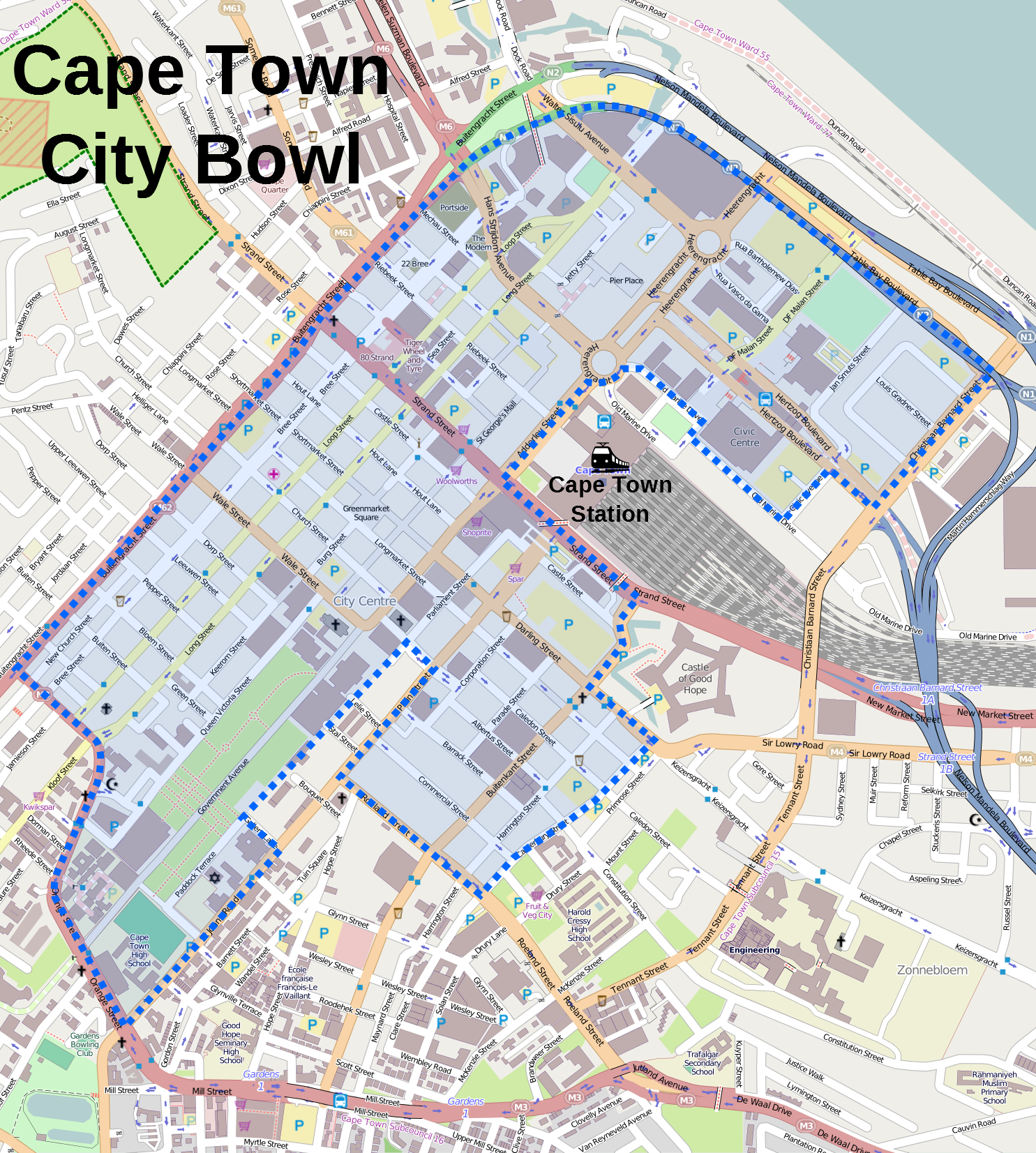
CCID's area of operation (shaded blue) in Cape Town CBD

The CCID provides what are known as "complementary top-up services" within a specified 1.6km² city improvement district (CID), in Cape Town CBD, Cape Town's main economic hub. The CID region is classified as a Special Rates Area (SRA) under the Municipal Property Rates Act (MPRA), Section 22, as well as the City of Cape Town's SRA bylaw.

As such, the CCID works with partner organizations the City of Cape Town and the South African Police Service to achieve its mandate. The CCID offers complementary top-up services under the following groups:

- Safety & Security (327 Public Safety Officers/PSOs, as of 2025)
- Urban Management
- Social Development

The organization also maintains an official Communications department.

Other partners of the CCID include the Western Cape Government; Metro Police; Cape Town Community Police Forum; the Green Point City Improvement District; the Oranje-Kloof City Improvement District; numerous neighborhood watch groups; J&M Cleaning; as well as various City of Cape Town departments such as Electricity Services, Roads & Stormwater, City Parks, and Health & Environmental Affairs.

Any property owner within the city improvement district can apply to become a member of the CCID, and membership cannot be denied. Once registered, a property owner is able to attend CCID meetings (held under the Companies Act), as well as participate and vote at those meetings.

=== Precincts ===
The CCID works across four operational precincts:

- Precinct 1: Foreshore area, with parts above and below Heerengracht Street. It includes the CTICC, numerous hotels, and many of the CBD's modern office towers
- Precinct 2: Between Buitengracht Street and Adderley Street. It includes a large portion of the retail sites in the CBD.
- Precinct 3: Parts above and below Bree Street, including the Company's Garden, Parliament, and numerous legal firms.
- Precinct 4: Parts above and below Buitenkant Street, including Cape Town City Hall and Central Library

== Recognition ==
The CCID and its success have been recognized as having been the catalyst for the development of over 50 other central improvement districts (CIDs) across the City of Cape Town.

== See also ==
- Cape Town CBD
