= Aerobotics =

South African agritech company

- Type: Private
- Industry: Agritech
- Founded: 2014; 12 years ago
- Founder: James Paterson; Benji Meltzer
- Headquarters: Cape Town, South Africa
- Area served: Worldwide
- Key people: James Paterson (CEO)
- Products: AI-powered fruit analytics software Yield forecasting software Crop analytics platform
- Services: Precision agriculture Agricultural data analytics Yield forecasting Orchard monitoring
- Number of employees: 50+ (2026)
- Website: aerobotics.com

Aerobotics is a South African agritech company, founded in 2014. Headquartered in Cape Town, Aerobotics develops AI-powered software for use in the agricultural sector.

Its platform combines smartphone imagery with machine learning and data analytics to provide growers with information for production planning and commercial decision-making. The company's stated goal is to use its automation tools to minimize inputs and maximize production.

As of mid-2026, Aerobotics has operations in 18 countries, serving fruit producers in most regions of the world.

== History ==
Aerobotics was founded in 2014 by James Paterson and Benji Meltzer.

In August 2017, Aerobotics secured R8 million in seed funding from South African tech venture capital firm 4Di and Kenya-based Savannah Fund. At the time, Aerobotics said it had already proven itself useful to stakeholders in the agricultural value chain, and had begun focusing on disruption of the crop insurance sector. Aerobotics said it was in the process of finalizing a number of pilot projects in various parts of the world, and would use the seed funding to expand its sales and marketing capabilities.

In December 2017, it was reported that in a study conducted by Aerobotics on a 3.75 hectare Western Cape peach orchard, its Aeroview software data showed the farm which trees were in need of help, and suggested how it could generate more fruit for export. The Aerobotics data thus avoided a R400,000 loss in income for the orchard.

In July 2018, Aerobotics secured approximately R27 million in Series A funding from South African commercial bank Nedbank's VC fund, as part of the bank's focus on agricultural finance.

In March 2019, Aerobotics announced that, through a partnership with Paper Plane Ventures, its Series A funding had been extended (and more than doubled) to R57 million. Aerobotics CEO James Paterson stated that the funding would be used to expand the company's operations in South Africa, the US, and other markets. At the time, the company had already set up teams in the US states of Florida and California.

In the same month, Aerobotics was in the process of developing a yield management tool within its Aeroview app. The tool's goal was to allow farmers to choose how much of their crops to thin in the early stages of growth, in order to maximize harvest yield. The tool allowed farmers to select a yield sample within their orchard, capture fruit counts and fruit sizes, and receive a report on the number of fruits, and their size distribution.

In 2021, the company raised around R230 million in a Series B funding round led by South African mass media and tech holding company Naspers. This was done via the company's early stage venture capital investment division, Naspers Foundry. Other investors included Platform Investment Partners, FMO: Entrepreneurial Development Bank, and Cathay AfricInvest Innovation.

In November 2025, US-based post-harvest freshness solutions company AgroFresh announced a partnership with Aerobotics. Through the partnership, AgroFresh expanded its FreshCloud digital ecosystem by integrating multiple Aerobotics TrueFruit modules into it. The TrueFruit software measures fruit size, color, and quality, and allows users to view yield data, for improved harvest planning and forecasting, from the orchard phase to the packhouse.

In February 2026, Aerobotics expanded its AI- and smartphone-based fruit grading platform, TrueFruit Grade. The tech had already been used for citrus harvests, and was expanded to include grapes and apples.

In April 2026, US agriculture equipment and financing company John Deere announced that Aerobotics had bee selected as one of that year's five companies to take part in its Startup Collaborator Program. Launched in 2019, the program partners John Deere with chosen startups for year-long, project-based collaboration that tests how emerging technologies perform in agricultural and construction use cases.

== Operations ==
As of mid-2026, Aerobotics operates in over 18 countries across the world.

By 2026, Aerobotics' software had analyzed more than 130 million fruit, with the goal of improving yield forecasting and profitability. The company's software includes:

- TrueFruit Size, for fruit sizing and forecasting
- TrueFruit Grade, for automated, standardized size, color, and quality measurements
- TrueFruit Bin, for post-harvest sizing and grading
- Drone Scan, for drone-based aerial crop monitoring and analysis
- Pest and Disease, for digitized pest trap monitoring

== See also ==
- Agricultural technology
- Agriculture in South Africa
