= Naspers =

South African multinational holding and investment company

Naspers Limited

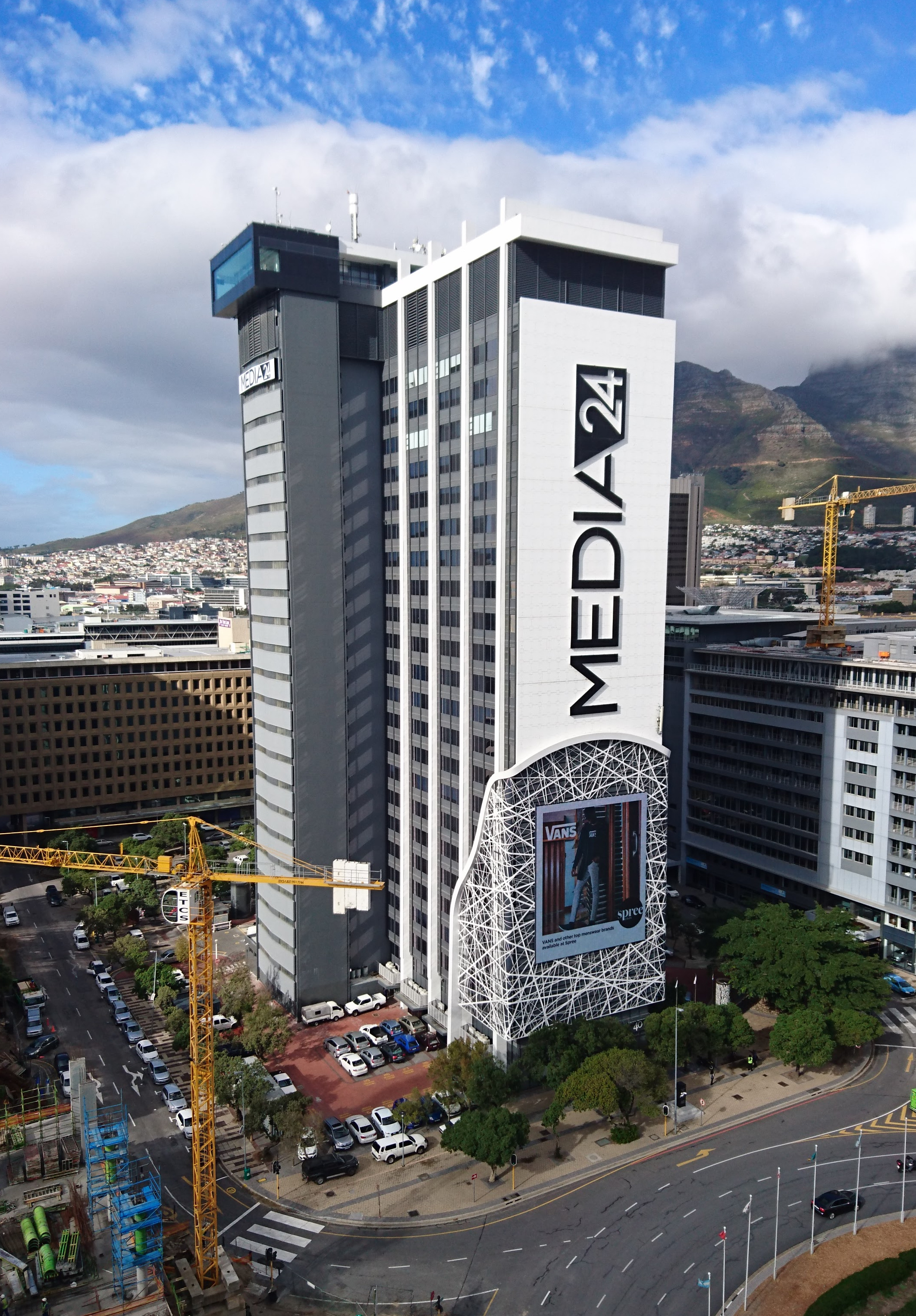
- Owned by Naspers, the Media24 Centre building in Foreshore, Cape Town CBD, serves as the company's headquarters
- Formerly: Die Nasionale Pers (until 1998)
- Type: Public
- Traded as: JSE: NPN; LSE: NPSN
- Industry: Internet, E-commerce, fintech, food delivery
- Founded: 12 May 1915; 111 years ago
- Founder: W.A. Hofmeyr
- Headquarters: Cape Town, South Africa
- Area served: Worldwide
- Key people: Koos Bekker (chair); Fabricio Bloisi (CEO); Phuti Mahanyele-Dabengwa (CEO, South Africa)
- Revenue: ▲US$22.1 billion (FY 2020)
- Operating income: ▲US$3.7 billion (FY 2020)
- Total assets: ▲US$36.3 billion (FY 2020)
- Total equity: ▲US$29.93 billion (FY 2020)
- Owner: Public Investment Corporation (14%); Koos Bekker
- Subsidiaries: Prosus; Media24; Property24; Takealot.com; Naspers Foundry
- Website: www.naspers.com

Naspers Limited (formerly Die Nasionale Pers) is a South African multinational, internet, technology and multimedia holding company headquartered in Cape Town.

The company has interests in online retail, publishing, real estate, and venture capital investment. Naspers' principal shareholder is its Dutch-listed investment subsidiary, Prosus, which owns approximately 49% of its parent as part of a cross-ownership structure.

Founded in 1915 by attorney William Angus Hofmeyr, Die Nasionale Pers was the largest publishing company in South Africa throughout the 20th century with interests across newspapers, magazines and books. In the 1980s, the company began to diversify, launching a subscription television service and investing in markets outside of South Africa for the first time.

In 2001, Naspers made an early investment in Chinese technology firm Tencent and became increasingly focused on the global consumer internet sector. In 2019, Naspers listed its global internet investment business unit Prosus (including a 31% stake in Tencent) on Euronext Amsterdam.

As of 2021, Naspers owned a 56.92% stake in Prosus and wholly owns Media24 (Africa's largest publishing company), Takealot.com (South Africa's largest online retailer) and Naspers Foundry, a South African focused venture capital fund.

== History ==
=== Founding and Afrikaner nationalism ===
In December 1914, twelve years after the end of the Second Boer War which had devastated most of South Africa and left most Afrikaners impoverished and subject to the British Empire, and during the pro-German Maritz rebellion, a group of sixteen prominent Cape Afrikaners decided at a meeting at District Bank manager Hendrik Bergh's house in Stellenbosch to form a publishing company that would support Afrikaner nationalism in the Union of South Africa.

That meeting led to Willie A. Hofmeyr founding Die Nasionale Pers Beperkt (National Press Ltd) in 1915 as a publisher of newspapers and magazines. At the time, Hofmeyr was a well-known Cape lawyer and organizer for the then-Afrikaner nationalist, conservative National Party, which would later implement the racially segregated system of apartheid in South Africa.

The firm's name was commonly shortened to Naspers (Die Nasionale Pers Beperk), the contraction eventually becoming used even by the company itself.

The launch of Die Nasionale Pers was financed by Jannie Marais, a prominent Stellenbosch farmer who had made a fortune in the Kimberley diamond mines and was the largest shareholder of the District Bank.

The press was closely associated with the National Party, founded by General J. B. M. Hertzog in January 1914. It began publishing the Afrikaans-language daily Die Burger (initially De Burger in Dutch) in June 1915, followed by its first magazine, Die Huisgenoot (initially De Huisgenoot), in 1916.

=== Domestic expansion (1917–1986) ===
In 1917, Die Nasionale Pers bought the weekly Bloemfontein-based Afrikaans newspaper Het Volksblad (now Volksblad), the first expansion beyond the Cape Province for the company. By 1924, the links to the National Party were formalised. In 1925, Die Volksblad started publishing daily. In 1937, it started Die Oosterlig in the Eastern Cape.

Also in 1937, Die Nasionale Pers set up the company Voortrekkerpers in the Transvaal to support the National Party in Transvaal by publishing Die Transvaler. Initially the Cape National Party tried to control the extremism of the National Party in the Transvaal by appointing Hendrik Verwoerd as the paper's first editor but he would side with Transvaal branch and Nationale Pers gave up editorial control in 1939.

In order to combat the influence of Albert Hertzog in the Transvaal National Party, Die Nasionale Pers introduced a more enlightened Sunday newspaper in 1965 in the province called the Die Beeld in competition to the Dagbreek. By 1970, these two papers, the latter owned by Perskor, to merge into a paper called the Rapport managed by both groups. In 1965, Die Nasionale Pers launched their first English-language magazine Fairlady. In 1974, the Afrikaans newspaper Beeld began publishing daily for the Johannesburg market.

Die Nasionale Pers entered the South African general and educational book publishing markets in 1918, initially publishing exclusively in Afrikaans. The company expanded to English-language titles in 1919 and Xhosa in 1922. It spun off its book publishing operations in 1950 into a separate business, Nasionale Boekhandel. In 1963, Die Nasionale Pers recommenced educational publishing operations through subsidiary Nasou.

In 1973, Die Nasionale Pers took back control of Nasionale Boekhandel, before acquiring another publishing house Human & Rousseau in 1977. The press continued to develop its book publishing business during the 1980s, forming the Afrikaans-language book club Leserskring in 1979 and the English-language book club Leisure Hour. In 1986, Die Nasionale Pers acquired publisher JL van Schaik.

In 1984, Die Nasionale Pers acquired Drum Publications, publisher of the Sunday newspaper City Press and weekly magazines Drum and True Love & Family, titles focused on a black readership.

=== Diversification, IPO and international expansion (1986–2003) ===
In 1986, Die Nasionale Pers formed a partnership with other South African publishing companies and launched pay-TV service M-Net. M-Net proved successful and, with sister companies MultiChoice and M-Web, steadily expanded its operations both in South Africa and internationally throughout the 1990s.

In 1994, Die Nasionale Pers became publicly listed on the Johannesburg Stock Exchange in South Africa. The company also obtained a Level I American Depository Receipt listing on the London Stock Exchange.

In 1998, the company formally changed its name to Naspers Limited. Naspers became increasingly focused on digital businesses; launching South African web portal Media24 and online retailer Kalahari.com in 1998 and Chinese-focused web portal SportCN in 2000.

In May 2001, Naspers purchased 46.5 percent of Chinese internet company Tencent, owner of WeChat, and an array of fintech apps and mobile games, from early investors including PCCW (the owner of Now TV) and IDG Capital. The investment has been referred to as one of the most successful venture capital deals of all time. Making Naspers the most valuable publicly traded business in Africa by 2017.

In 2003, Naspers took full ownership of subscription television business M-Net and its sister companies MultiChoice and M-Web, integrating their extensive operations across Europe, Africa, Asia and the Middle East. Naspers also launched new publishing ventures in Nigeria and Hungary in 2003.

=== Online ventures (2003–2015) ===
With the success of the investment in Tencent, Naspers became an investor in a number of consumer internet startups. In January 2007 Naspers purchased a 30% share of Russia's largest internet company VK (company) (formerly Mail.ru Group) for $165 million. In 2012, they led major funding for Souq along with Tiger global.

Naspers had a particular focus on India, investing more than $4 billion from 2014 to 2019, across multiple sectors, including into Byju and ibibo. In December 2018, Naspers invested $1 billion into Indian online food ordering and delivery service Swiggy, the largest single investment made, outside of China, into a food tech company.

=== Consolidation (2015–present) ===
In 2015, Naspers merged its South African–focused Kalahari.com online retail business with market leader Takealot.com, acquiring a 46% stake in the merged company and creating South Africa's largest online retailer. By 2018, Naspers owned 96% of Takealot.com.

In December 2016, Naspers announced that it had entered into an agreement to sell telecommunications company M-Web to Internet Solutions (a subsidiary of Japanese telecommunications conglomerate Nippon Telegraph and Telephone), pending approval by the South African competition authorities. On 9 May 2017, it was announced that the South African competition authorities approved the proposed sale of M-Web, with 31 May 2017 being the effective commencement date.

In March 2018 Naspers sold part of its stake in Tencent, raising some $10 billion to fund other investments. At the time, its initial investment of $32 million in Tencent was valued at over $175 billion.

Naspers' video entertainment business was spun off as MultiChoice Group, on 27 February 2019, represented as MCG on the Johannesburg Stock Exchange. Shares in Multichoice Group were unbundled to Naspers shareholders, with Naspers retaining no stake in the newly listed company.

Still in 2019, Naspers listed its global internet investment business on Euronext Amsterdam as Prosus, which became Europe's largest consumer Internet company on its market debut. Share values gained over 25 percent on the day of its IPO, with Prosus' market capitalisation exceeding 125 billion pounds (US$138 billion). Prosus reported profits of $4.2 billion for its fiscal year ending 31 March 2019.

Naspers Labs, designed in partnership with RLabs and its founder Marlon Parker, launched in 2019 as an economic initiative for unemployed youth in South Africa.

In May 2021, Naspers announced a share swap deal with its Dutch-listed subsidiary Prosus in an attempt to reduce the discount between the asset value of the companies and their market capitalisation. The deal, successfully completed in August 2021, reduced Naspers' stake in Prosus to 56.92% and gave Prosus an approximately 49% share in its parent company.

Following the 2022 Russian invasion of Ukraine, Naspers (through its subsidiary Prosus) wrote off its 27.29% investment, previously valued at US$769 million, in the Russian internet company VK.

== Controversies ==
=== Apartheid ===
Documents collected by OpenSecrets revealed how Die Nasionale Pers funded the National Party (NP) during apartheid, and that the NP also held 74,000 shares in Die Nasionale Pers in 1984.

In a letter written to F.W. de Klerk, on 17 August 1989, the then managing director of Die Nasionale Pers, Ton Vosloo, reaffirmed the company's support of the National Party. Vosloo reminded de Klerk of its donation of R150,000 (approximately R1-million today), made to the NP before the 1987 elections.

The company had then also pledged a further R220,000 in support of the NP ahead of South Africa's last race-based general elections, in September 1989. Vosloo ended his letter, promising funding to the NP in Transvaal, by adding that "our newspaper Beeld in the Transvaal is your ally and we trust that this formidable combination will wipe out the competition."

In 1997, the Truth and Reconciliation Commission requested that Die Nasionale Pers make a submission about the years between 1960 and 1994 (thus, broadly, between the Sharpeville massacre, in March 1960, and the first democratic elections of April 1994), specifically, the media's role during this period.

Die Nasionale Pers refused to comply, which led to 127 employees each making an individual submission to the TRC, apologising for their role in the apartheid years. They said Die Nasionale Pers newspapers had formed an integral part of the power structure which implemented and maintained apartheid through, for instance, supporting the NP in elections and referendums.

In 2015, Media24 CEO Esmare Weideman issued a case-limited apology citing a single employee, Conrad Sidego, who had experienced problems with separate facilities. She did not issue an unqualified apology for Naspers's role in supporting apartheid.

== Assets ==
Naspers has two principal business units; Prosus & Naspers South Africa.

=== Prosus ===
Prosus is the largest consumer internet company in Europe, and among the largest technology investors in the world, operating across a variety of platforms and geographies. As part of a share swap deal announced in May 2021, Prosus acquired a 49% stake in its parent company Naspers. Other major holdings of Prosus include:

- E-commerce – including OLX (100%)
- Fintech – including PayU (98.8%)
- Food delivery – including iFood (54.8%), Delivery Hero (22.3%) and Swiggy (38.8%)
- Retail – including eMag (80.1%)
- Travel – including its associate, Ctrip (6%)
- Mobility – Bykea
- EdTech – Codecademy, Stack Overflow, Brainly, Udemy

Prosus is also the largest shareholder of social Internet platforms:

- Tencent (26.16%)
- VK (27.29%) – this investment was written off in March 2022.

=== Naspers South Africa ===
Naspers South Africa operates four media, e-commerce & venture capital businesses in South Africa:

==== Media24 ====
Naspers wholly owns Media24, Africa's largest publisher, printer, and distributor of magazines and related products, as well its largest newspaper publisher.

==== Property24 ====
Naspers wholly owns Property24, South Africa's largest online real estate listing website. The site, which receives 2.2 million visitors per month (26.4 million per year) as of May 2025, features both rental and sale listings across South Africa.

==== Takealot.com ====
Naspers wholly owns Takealot.com, South Africa's largest online retailer.

==== Naspers Foundry ====
Naspers Foundry is a South Africa-focused early stage venture capital fund that invests in firms that "address big societal needs". Naspers Foundry ceased investment operations in March 2023, though it maintained its existing investments. Companies that Naspers Foundry has invested in include Cape Town-based agritech company Aerobotics, insurance company Naked, personal finance company LifeCheq, and home cleaning company Sweepsouth.

== See also ==
- List of South African mass media
- Media24 Centre
