= Takealot Group =

South African e-commerce company

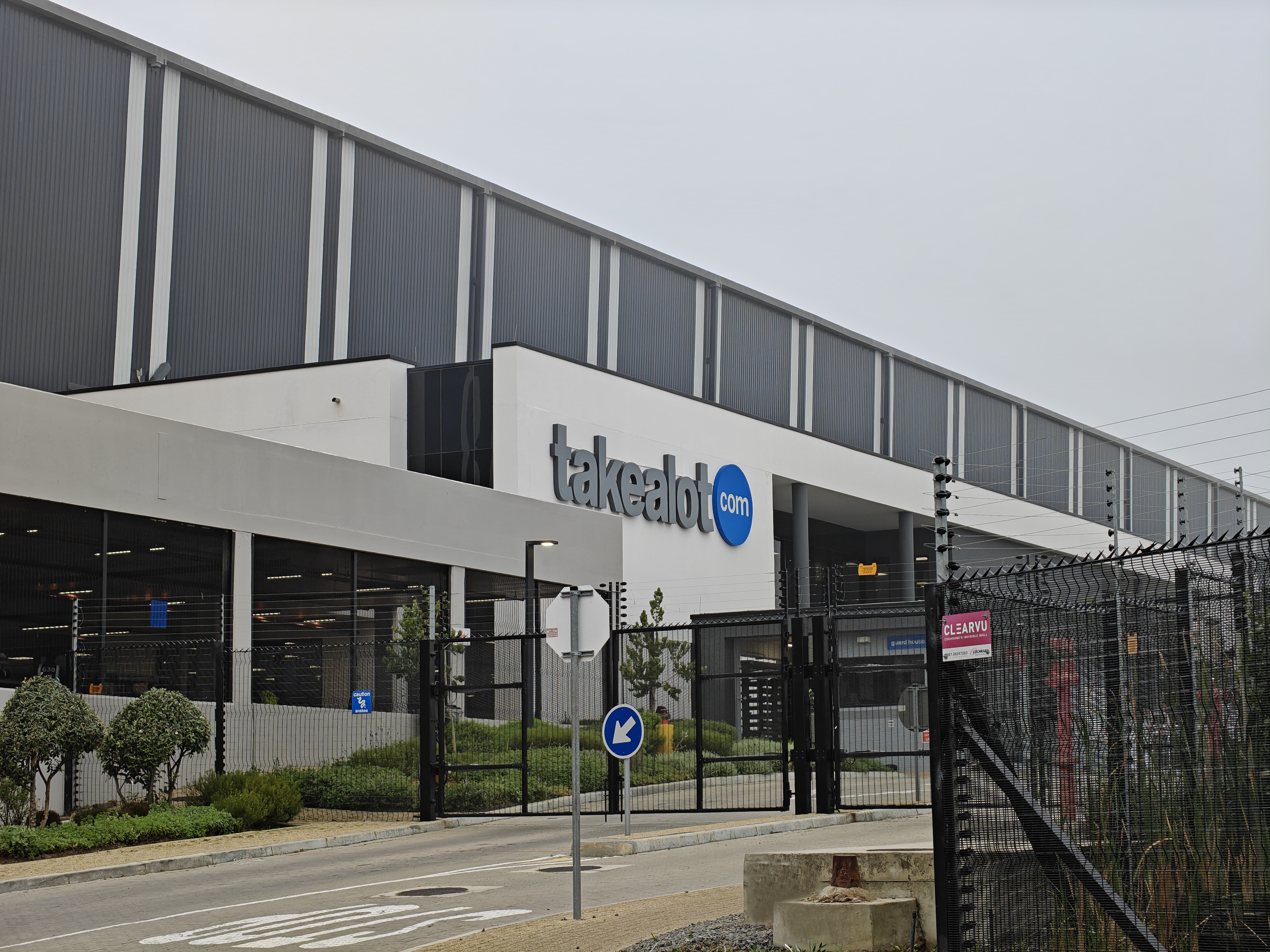
- Takealot building in Milnerton, Cape Town
- Type: Subsidiary
- Industry: E-commerce; Retail
- Founded: June 2011; 15 years ago
- Founder: Kim Reid
- Headquarters: Cape Town, South Africa
- Area served: South Africa
- Revenue: ▲ R16.4 billion (2026)
- Operating income: ▲ R181 million (2026)
- Number of employees: 2,471 (2024)
- Parent: Naspers
- Divisions: Takealot.com; TakealotMORE; Mr D Marketplace
- Website: takealot.com

The Takealot website home page

Takealot (officially Takealot Group) is a South African e-commerce company founded in 2011, and owned by major mass media corporation, Naspers.

Headquartered in Cape Town's Foreshore area, the company operates numerous divisions, including takealot.com, South Africa's largest online retailer.

In 2024, Takealot contributed 12.3% to parent company Naspers' overall revenue, and in 2026, takelot.com comprised around 92% of Takealot Group's total revenue. While takelot.com became profitable in 2024, Takealot Group as a whole set a profitability goal of 2026. In June 2026, the group met its goal, reporting it had achieved full-year earnings before tax profitability for the first time.

== History ==
In October 2010, former MWEB CEO Kim Reid and US-based investment firm Tiger Global Management acquired existing South African ecommerce business Take2, renaming it takealot.com. Takealot.com was officially launched to the public in June 2011.

In 2014, Takealot launched an on-demand food delivery service after acquiring Mr Delivery (rebranded Mr D) and Superbalist, which at the time was South Africa’s largest online fashion retailer.

In the same year, Takealot announced that a merger would take place with then-major South African online retailer, Kalahari.com. The merger was successfully completed in May 2015, with South African mass media company Naspers acquiring a 46.5% shareholding in Takealot, for a sum of R1.2 billion.

In 2018, Naspers increased its shareholding in Takealot to 96%.

After 13 years, the takealot.com e-commerce site reported profitability in 2024. Food delivery service Mr D had also achieved profitability at this time, however the Takealot Group as a whole was still making a loss.

In September 2024, Takealot sold online fashion retail site Superbalist to a South African consortium of retail and private equity investors, led by Blank Canvas Capital.

In May 2024, Takealot launched an optional subscription service with two tiers called TakealotMORE, somewhat akin to Amazon Prime.

In September 2025, Takealot announced the launch of its business-to-business (B2B) service, Takealot for Business.

In October 2025, Takealot announced plans to open a new depot inside Inospace’s Powder Mill Park in Ndabeni, Cape Town. Launching on 15 January 2026, the depot is part of major renovations to the overall site, which is set to become Cape Town’s first e-commerce logistics park.

For the 2025 financial year, Naspers reported that takealot.com had 17% revenue growth, to a total of R12.9 billion, while Mr D's revenue rose 8% to R2.1 billion.

In December 2025, Takealot began trialing a near instant delivery service, using its in-house Mr D courier division. On certain items (around 1,000 in total), a "Get it Now" button would allow customers to receive products within minutes of ordering them, according to the company. The pilot, launched in Cape Town, Pretoria, and Johannesburg, offered a service similar to that of major retailer Checkers' popular Sixty60 on-demand grocery delivery service.

In June 2026, Takealot Group achieved profitability for the first time since its 2011 establishment. Shifting from a R214 million loss the previous year, the group posted a R181 million profit for its 2026 financial year. In its year-end results, parent company Naspers said that, despite competition from newcomer Amazon SA, Takealot had grown its revenue by 18% year-over-year.

Revenue growth was driven primarily by e-commerce store Takealot.com, which saw annual revenue growth of 28%. This was in part due to the newly-launched TakealotMORE subscription service. In the same results, Naspers said the Mr D on-demand food delivery service achieved 18% annual revenue growth.

Also in June 2026, it was reported that Takealot Fulfilment Services (TFS), the group's new logistics company, was providing warehousing and distribution services to local retail company Woolworths, and its subsidiary. Takealot's delivery subsidiary, Mr D, had partnered to provide services to Pick n Pay, Nespresso, Frozen 4 You, and Woolworths-owned Absolute Pets.

== Operations ==
=== Delivery Network ===
Takealot provides delivery services in all major metropolitan areas across South Africa, under its Mr D banner. The company uses a variety of vehicles, depending on package size, and offers same-day and next-day delivery options, as well as weekend delivery. As of 2019, Takealot contracts over 4,500 delivery drivers and carries out over 1.6 million monthly deliveries.

==== Delivery Services ====
Takealot offers a streamlined delivery service for specific takealot.com items, via its Mr D app, called TakealotNOW.

=== Food Delivery ===
As a distinct division, Takealot operates Mr D food deliveries from restaurants and supermarkets via the Mr D app. The company acquired a majority stake in Mr Delivery, a pioneer in the South African food delivery industry, in 2014. The service, rebranded as Mr D, competes with the likes of Uber Eats in South Africa. For grocery delivery, Mr D has a partnership with major South African retailer Pick n Pay to offer a dedicated grocery shopping service on the app.

=== Distribution Centres ===
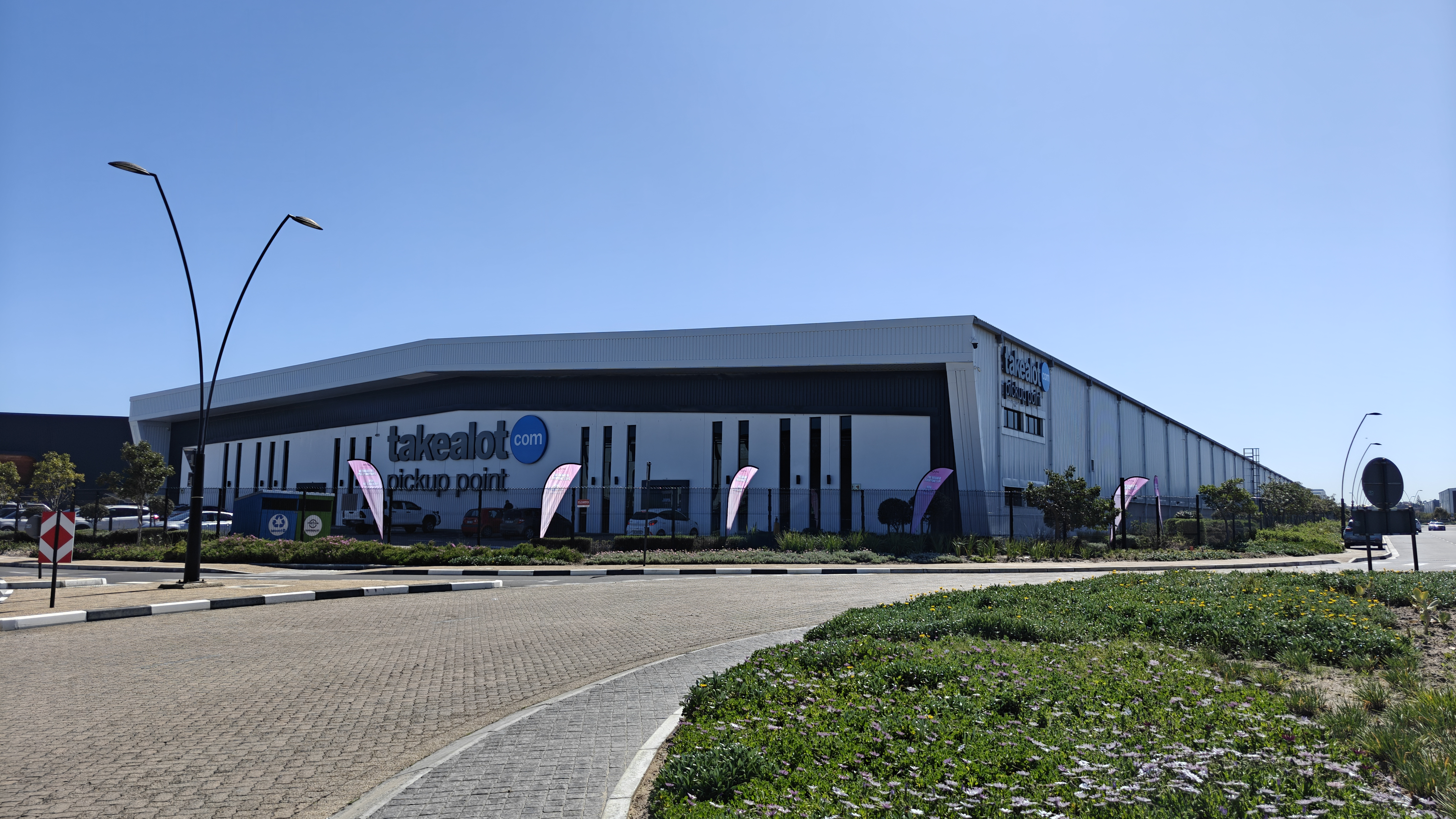
Takealot Warehouse 3 and pickup point in Milnerton, Cape Town

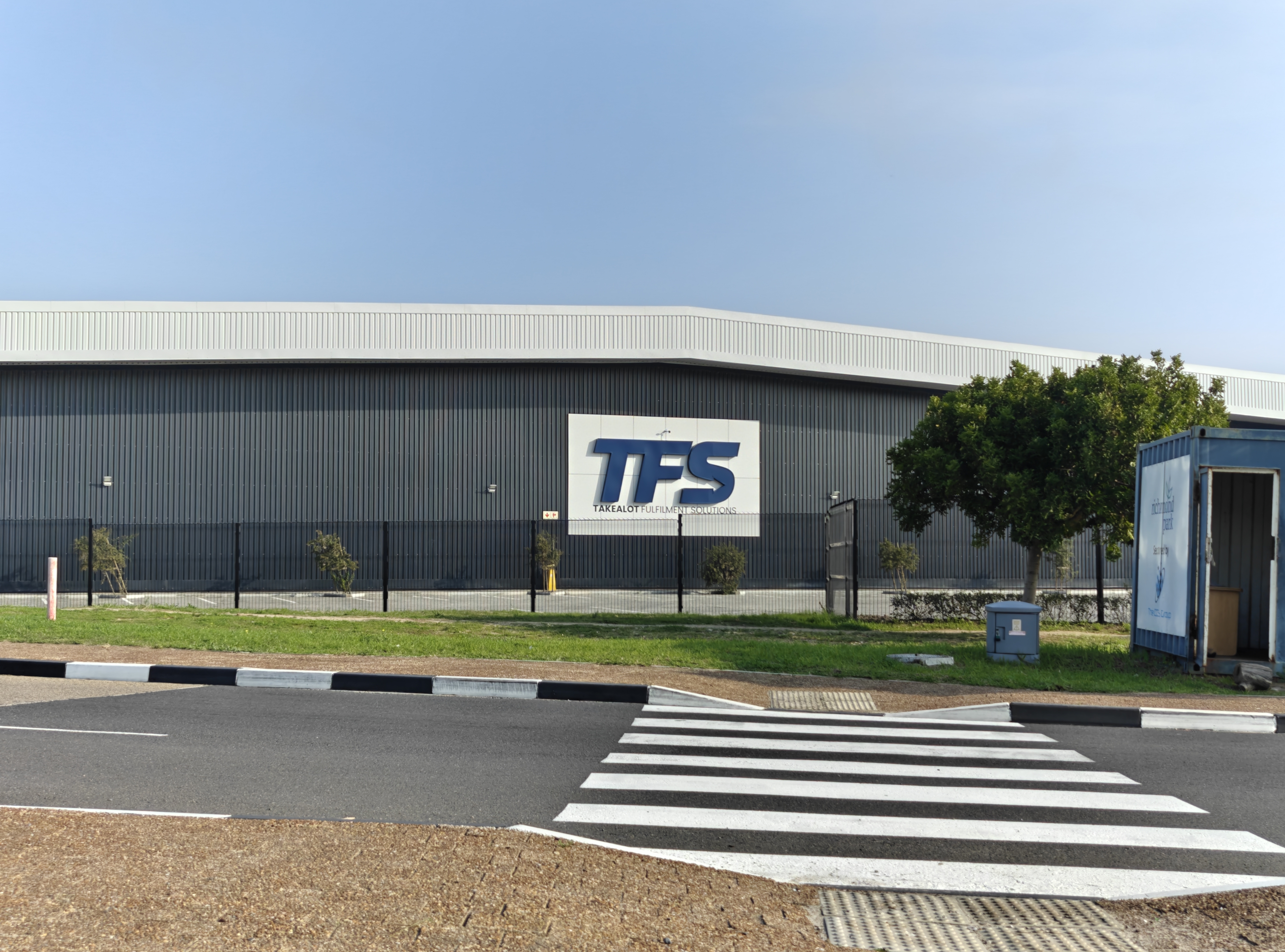
Takealot Fulfilment Solutions warehouse in Cape Town

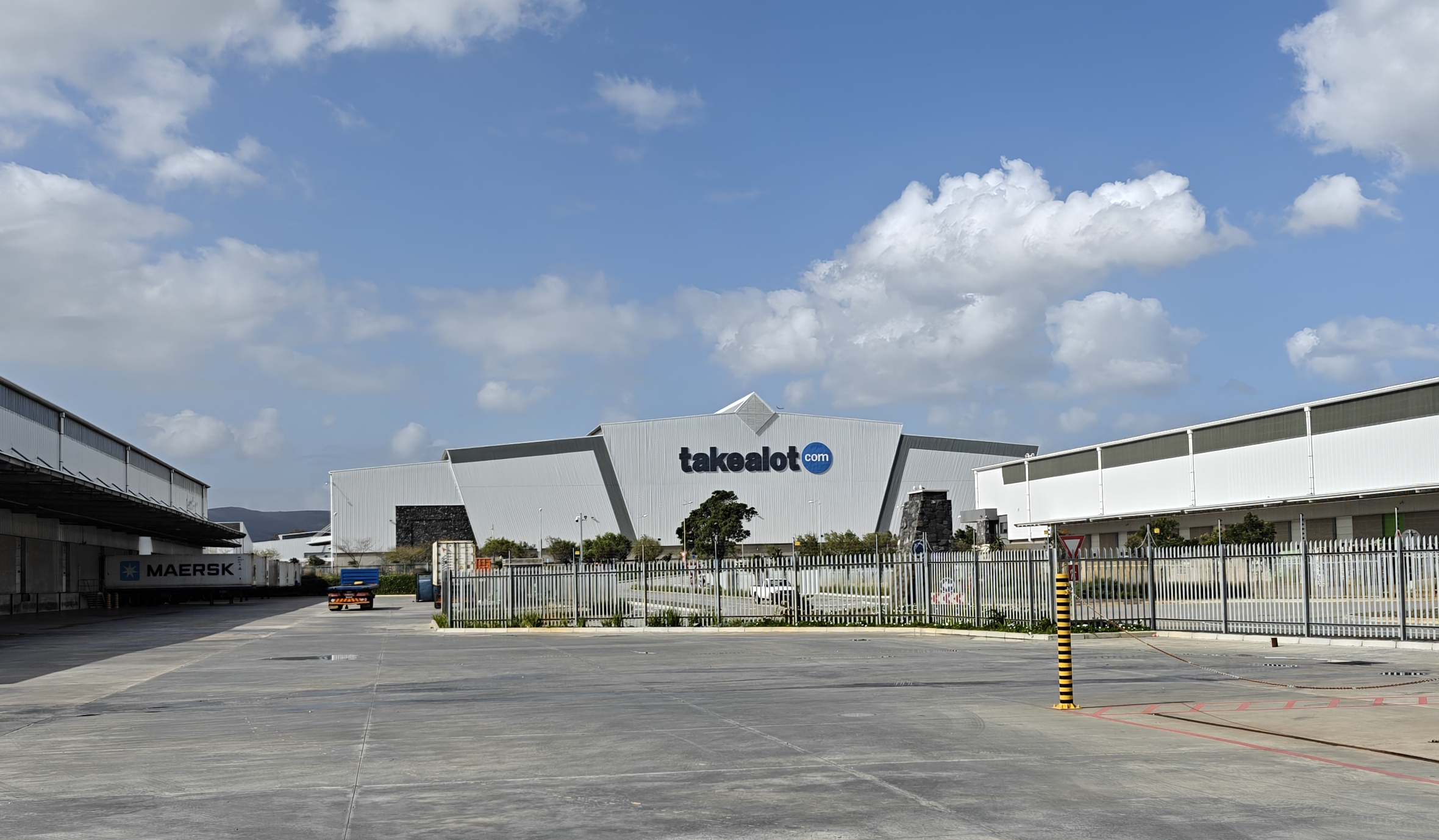
Takealot distribution center in Cape Town

Takealot currently has distribution centres in the Western Cape and Gauteng.

=== Collection Points ===
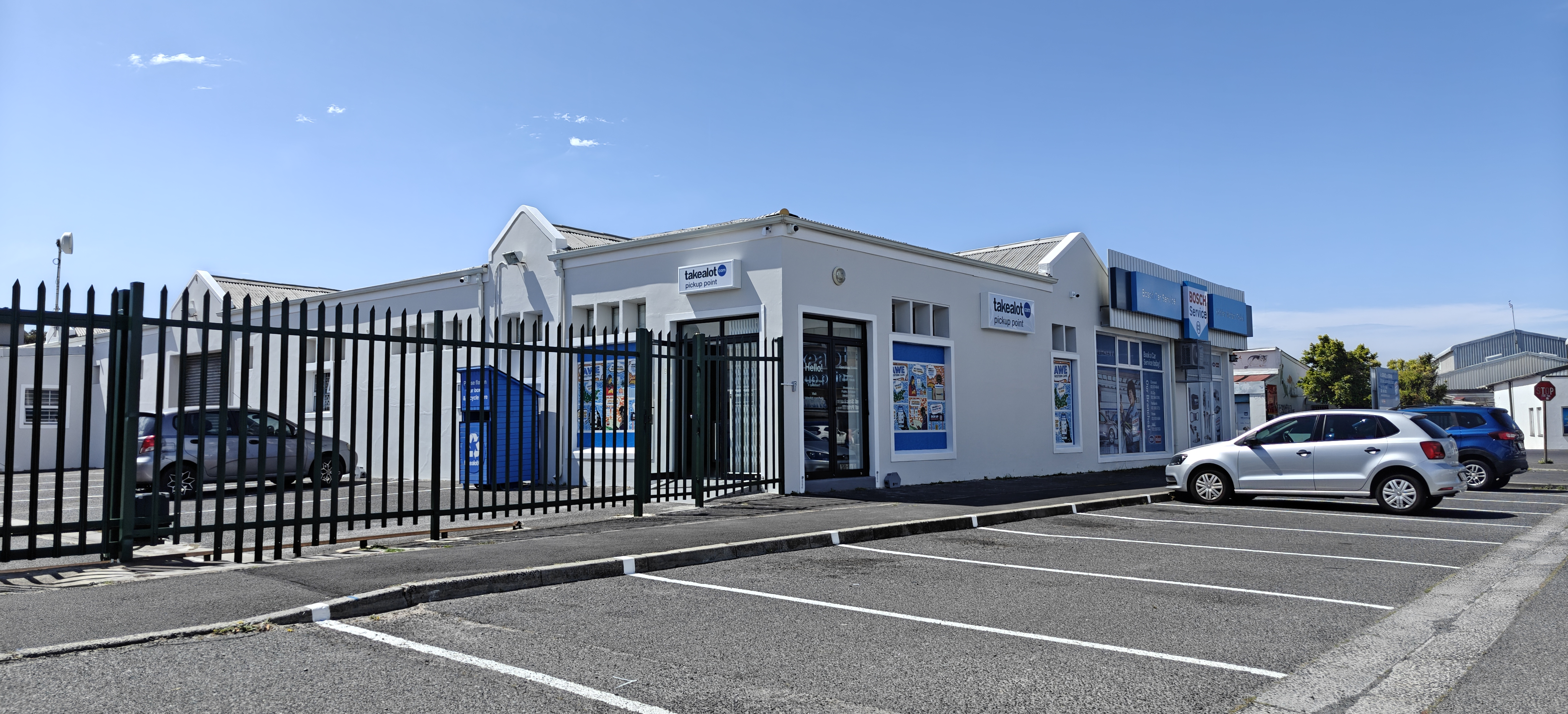
Takealot pickup point in Tokai, Cape Town

In April 2019 Takealot opened its first series of collection points, branded as Takealot Pickup Points. As of March 2020, over 50 Takealot Pickup Points are available in all 9 South African provinces.

=== Takealot Marketplace ===
Takealot's Marketplace enables third party sellers to offer goods to consumers. These are fulfilled by the suppliers instead of directly by Takealot. As of 2024, the company had over 11,000 active sellers on its Marketplace.

== Corporate social responsibility ==
Since 2024, Takealot distribution centers have used a new storage system which reduces the number of boxes per order for around 70% of all orders the company processes. Packaging pallets are also restored and reused. Furthermore, the company has optimized its inbound courier network to reduce the number of deliveries to DCs.

Takealot is a member of the South African Plastics Pact, a collaboration of industry members aimed at reducing plastic waste through lobbying local and national governments to enact regulations that improve waste management, such as via recycling.

Takealot warehouses and distribution centers in Cape Town, Durban, and Johannesburg make use of solar power. As of 2024, combined solar capacity is around 1,800 kWp.

The company operates an electric bike (e-bike) fleet of around 200 vehicles, as well as around 20 electric trucks.

As of September 2025, Takealot has 232 e-bikes, 41 Mellowvan 3-wheeled EVs, and 16 electric commercial trucks (with another 14 trucks on order). E-bikes are used for Takealot's on-demand deliveries, Mr D, and TakealotNow services. Mellowvans (produced in South Africa), are used for last-mile Takealot deliveries. The company's fleet of JAC N75 trucks are used for middle-mile deliveries.

== Criticism ==
=== Labor practices ===
Takealot has garnered attention from South African labour unions following protests from Takealot workers in July 2022.

=== Cloned goods ===
In March 2026, local online media outlet MyBroadband published that it had received numerous reports from local Takealot merchants alleging that their products had been cloned by foreign sellers, and then listed for a lower price. Furthermore, a local merchant alleged that numerous foreign sellers were using tactics such as using local intermediaries and rotating bank accounts in order to avoid taxes that local merchants had to pay, thereby undercutting their prices on Takealot. Local merchants also pointed out the irony of Takealot complaining about the influence of Chinese online retailers like Temu and Shein, while itself stocking items from Chinese suppliers.

In response, Takealot said it had not noted an increase in counterfeit goods, and said employed robust anti-counterfeit measures. Takealot confirmed it has a zero-tolerance policy towards counterfeit goods, and immediately bans sellers found guilty of marketing such goods. The company also said that local merchants were themselves importing goods from China to resell. Furthermore, Takealot said that, "the expansion of international sourcing reflects the natural maturation of South Africa’s e-commerce landscape", and that combining local and international suppliers followed global best practice. The company stated that it treats all sellers equally, regardless of the origin of their products.

== See also ==
- Retailing in South Africa
- Naspers
