= Sweepsouth =

- Type: Private
- Industry: Domestic cleaning services Garden maintenance Home services
- Founded: 2014; 12 years ago
- Headquarters: Cape Town, South Africa
- Area served: South Africa
- Key people: Aisha Pandor (Co-Founder); Alen Ribic (Co-Founder)
- Website: sweepsouth.com

Sweepsouth (officially Shift South Pty Ltd and stylized as sweepsouth) is a South African on-demand online platform for domestic cleaning services, garden maintenance, elder care services, mom's helper services, moving cleaning, business cleaning, and other home services.

It was the first end-to-end booking platform for home cleaning services to launch in Southern Africa.

== History ==
Sweepsouth was founded in 2014 by Aisha Pandor and Alen Ribic. The online platform and mobile app currently has an estimated 1.2 million registered domestic workers, potential workers as well as employers. In terms of growth, in 2017, the company received funding from investors such as Smollan Group, FirstRand's Vumela Fund, 500 Startups, IDF Managers, Newtown Partners, CRE Venture Capital and Draper Dark Flow.

In 2014, Sweepsouth won the SiMODiSA Startup South Africa Awards.

In 2015, the company became the first South African company to join top US accelerator 500 Global (formerly 500 Startups), and in 2016 it was awarded at the Price Check tech startup awards and was the first runner up of the FNB Innovation Awards in 2017.

In 2018, the company was recognised at the Southern African Venture Capital and Private Equity Association (SAVCA) Industry Awards as best start up company.

In 2019, during a series B fundraising, the company secured investment from Naspers becoming the first startup to receive an investment from Naspers through its early-stage business funding initiative called Naspers Foundry and in 2022, Sweepsouth secured more funding from Alitheia IDF, E4E Africa, Endeavor Harvest and Catalyst, and Caruso Ventures.

In 2020, Sweepsouth won the Forbes Africa Women Innovation Award, and in 2021, the company was listed among FastCompany South Africa’s Most Innovative Businesses.

As of May 2025, the company had 6,500 active home services professionals on its platform, had served over 250,000 clients, and had facilitated over 2.5 million home services.

== Operations ==
Sweepsouth operates a website and app, through which consumers can book a variety of on-demand home services, provided by SweepStars - individuals on the platform for whom background checks have been undertaken. The company provides these services across South Africa.

Services offered include cleaning, garden maintenance, and dog walking. The company allows users to schedule appointments, including repeat appointments for a discounted rate, and offers insurance for its services.

The company advocates for fair labor practices and the rights of domestic workers in South Africa, and has worked with the World Economic Forum's Digital2Equal Initiative to push for fair work and financial and digital inclusion in the industry.
