= 16 on Bree =

Building in Cape Town CBD

- Etymology: Named after its address

General information
- Status: Completed
- Type: Mixed-use, primarily residential high-rise
- Architectural style: Contemporary
- Location: 16 Bree Street, Cape Town CBD, Cape Town, South Africa
- Coordinates: 33.91774°S 18.42446°E
- Year built: 2018–2021
- Construction started: 2018; 8 years ago
- Topped-out: 2020; 6 years ago
- Completed: 2021; 5 years ago
- Cost: R800 million
- Client: Cape Town Properties 9

Height
- Height: 118m
- Top floor: 108m

Technical details
- Floor count: 36
- Lifts/elevators: 4

Design and construction
- Architecture firm: FWJK Architecture
- Developer: FWJK Developments
- Structural engineer: Zutari (formerly Aurecon)
- Civil engineer: Zutari
- Quantity surveyor: FWJK Quantity Surveyors
- Main contractor: Concor Western Cape

Other information
- Parking: 10 parking levels
- Public transit: MyCiTi Strand & Thibault Square

Website
- 16onbree.co.za

16 on Bree is a mixed-use skyscraper in Cape Town, South Africa, located in the city's CBD. Completed in 2021, and developed by FWJK at a cost of R800 million, the building holds the title of tallest residential tower in Cape Town. As of 2026, it is the city's tallest completed building by floor count, and third-tallest by height.

The building consists of 374 condos, 10 levels of parking, and three ground floor retail tenants.

== Location ==
The building is situated at 16 Bree Street, in Cape Town CBD, hence its name. It is located approximately 500m from the CTICC, 500m from the entrance to the V&A Waterfront, 1km from the Port of Cape Town, and 20km from Cape Town International Airport.

16 on Bree is close to the intersection where the N1 and N2 freeways enter the CBD.

The tower's neighbors include Portside Tower (the tallest building in Cape Town), the Bowmans building (at 22 Bree), the CDH building (at 11 Buitengracht), Touchstone House, and One on Bree.

== History ==
The development of 16 on Bree was announced in February 2017 by FWJK Developments, with plans for a 36-story, primarily residential tower in Cape Town CBD. The project was initially expected to be completed in 2020 and become the tallest residential building in the city.

In December 2017, FWJK awarded the construction contract to Concor Western Cape. Construction began in 2018, following the demolition of existing buildings on the site. The project incorporated the preservation of a historic façade dating back more than a century, which required structural reinforcement during construction.

By April 2020, construction had reached the building's 36th floor, marking the completion of its main structural frame. The development was valued at approximately R800 million.

Construction was completed in March 2021. The finished development became Cape Town's tallest completed residential building.

== See also ==
- List of tallest buildings in Cape Town
