= Media24 Centre =

Skyscraper in Cape Town, South Africa

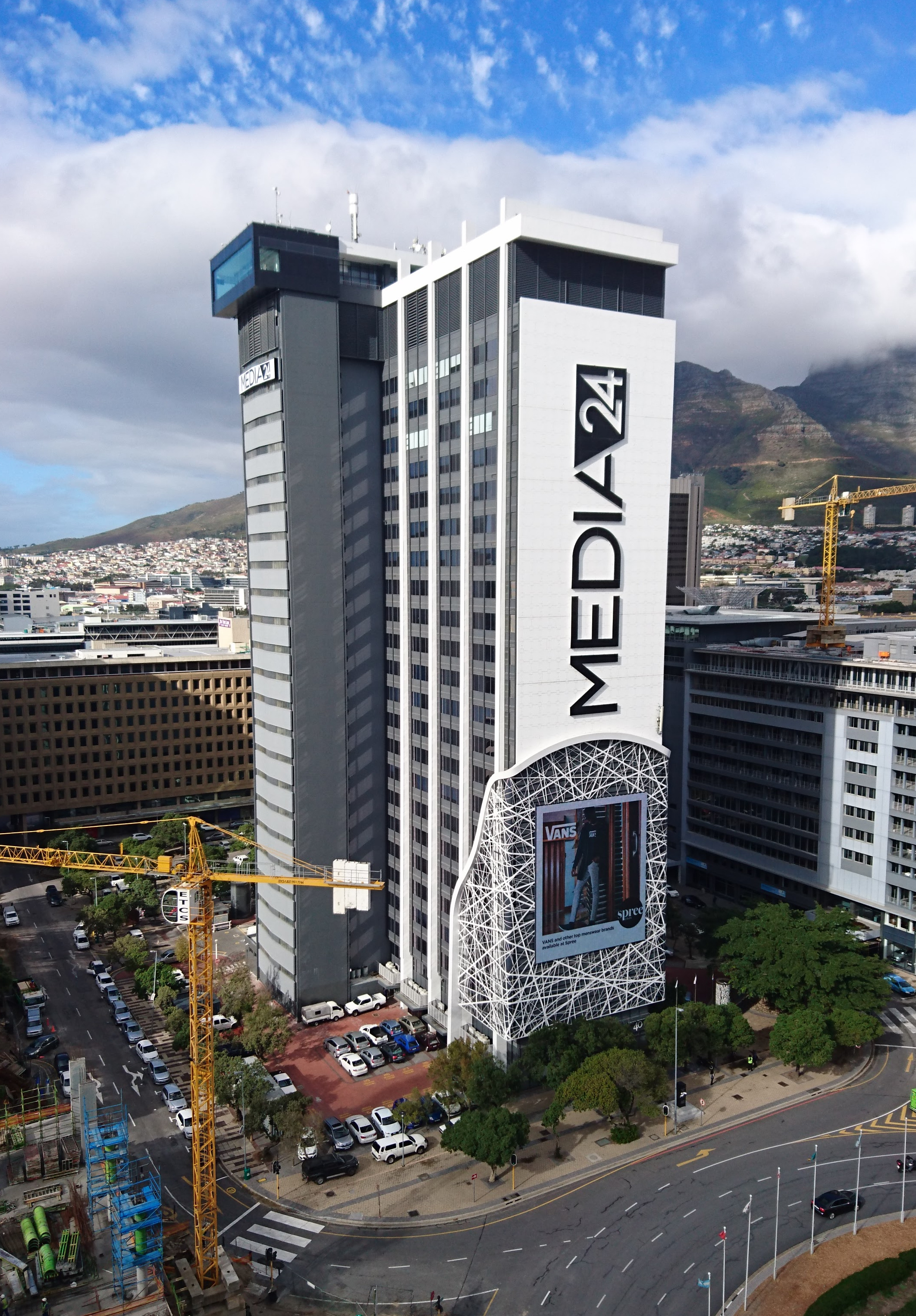
- A view of the northern side of the Media24 Centre, with part of Table Mountain in the background
- Interactive map of the Media24 Centre area
- Former names: Naspers Centre; Sanlam Centre

General information
- Status: In use
- Type: Commercial
- Architectural style: Modernism
- Location: 40 Heerengracht Street, Foreshore, Cape Town CBD, Cape Town, South Africa
- Coordinates: 33°55′04.9″S 18°25′43.8″E
- Current tenants: Naspers; Media24; Wesgro
- Completed: 1962; 64 years ago
- Renovated: 2014; 12 years ago
- Owner: Naspers

Height
- Height: 93.27 m (306.0 ft)

Technical details
- Floor count: 26

Design and construction
- Architects: Meiring, Naudé, Papendorf, and Van Der Merwe
- Main contractor: Murray & Roberts

Renovating team
- Architect: DBM Architects

The Media24 Centre is a 26-storey, 93-metre (305 ft) skyscraper located at 40 Heerengracht Street in the Foreshore area of Cape Town, South Africa. As of 2026, it is the 14th-tallest building in Cape Town, and forms a prominent part of the Cape Town CBD skyline.

The building serves as the headquarters of one of South Africa's largest mass media and news media companies, Media24, after which the building is named. Media24 is a subsidiary of one of SA's largest companies by annual revenue; multinational media company Naspers. The building serves as Naspers' headquarters as well, and was for many years named the Naspers Centre.

== History ==
The building was designed by architecture firm Meiring, Naudé, Papendorf, and Van Der Merwe in 1961.

At its completion in 1962, it was known as the Sanlam Centre, after major South African financial services corporation Sanlam, who was the building's main tenant. At the time, it was the tallest building in South Africa, and the fourth tallest in Africa. An electronic news feed used to be displayed on the exterior of the building at night.

=== Redesign ===
In 2014, Naspers announced that the then-Naspers Centre would be redesigned inside and out. The building would receive a new facade, and proposed designs would be accepted as part of a public competition. Interested parties submitted designs as part of Cape Town's World Design Capital 2014 program.

Then-CEO of Media24, Esmare Weideman, said the redesign would bring new life to Cape Town's oldest skyscraper, and would contribute to the continued expansion of the Foreshore region and the city as a whole.

The process resulted in numerous competition winners, who each received monetary prizes. First prize (and R200,000) was awarded on 11 April 2014, to Tsai Design Studio. The firm's submission was inspired by the transition from print to digital media.

Construction for the revamp began in late 2014 and was completed in 2015. According to Naspers, it was done to commemorate 100 years of publishing by the company, since the inception of its Afrikaans language news publication Die Burger, in July 1915.

DBM Architects were appointed as part of the project, and it is their designed, titled Roots, that was used for the main part of the facade. It features white root-like structures reaching up from the street, past most floors of the building. The roots, which span 15 storeys, are custom made from HulaBond aluminum paneling, fitted onto a steelwork structure, and were an engineering first for South Africa.

Another addition during the redesign was that of a 14 x 6 meter digital display on the northern side, facing Heerengracht Street, which would display advertisements for Media24 publications, such as its magazines. At the time of installation, the screen was the largest and greenest in SA.

As part of the redesign, the building was renamed to the Media24 Centre, after Naspers' publishing house subsidiary Media24. At the same time, the Media24 logo was redesigned by Crispian Brown, Group Creative Director at New Media Publishing, a Media24 affiliate.

In 2018, the building received a modernization of its 10 elevators by KONE.

== Features ==
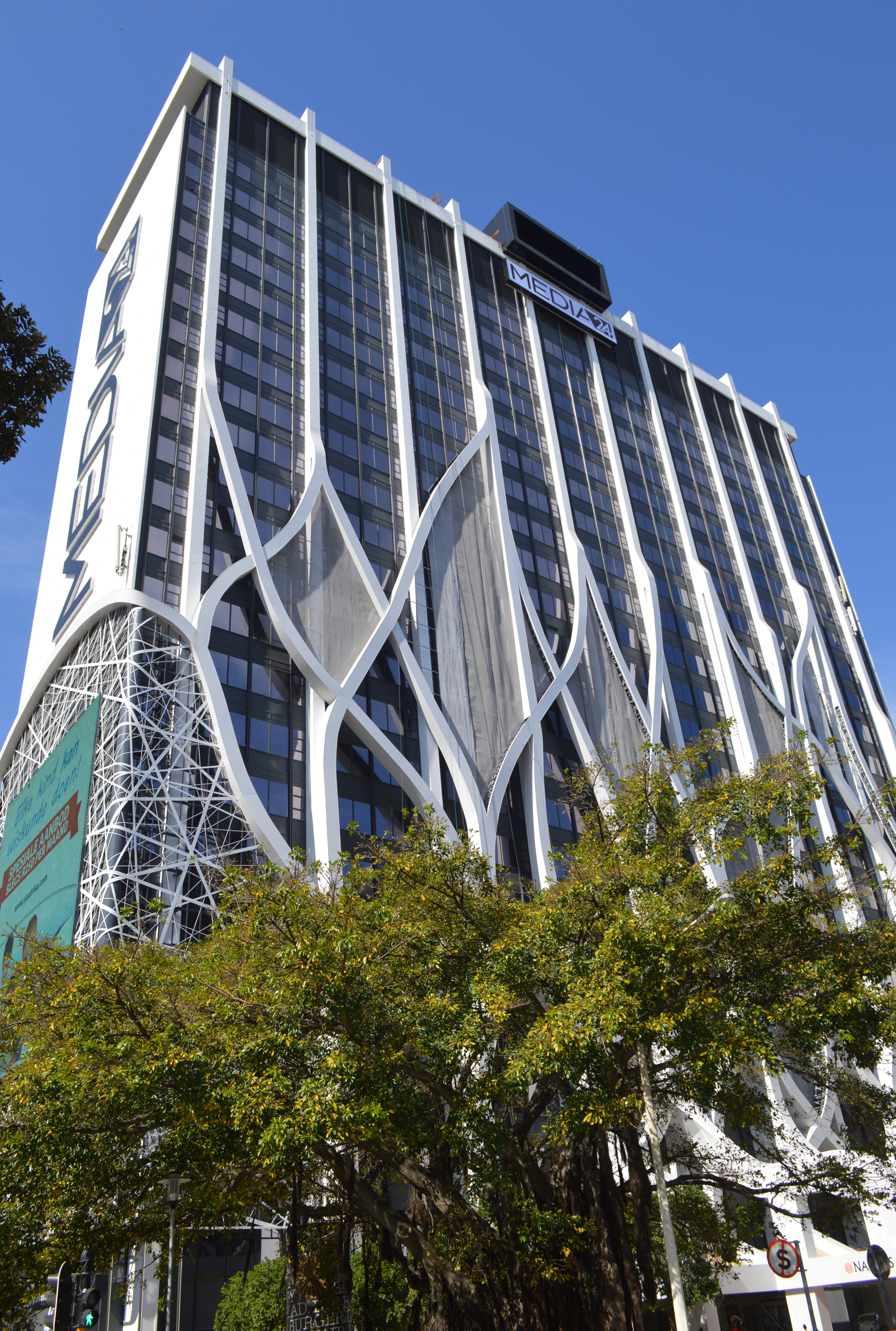
The western side of the building, with its root-inspired facade

The 26 storey building features a white, curved lattice styled design all around its facade, with black metal window frames, and a prominent, 34 x 6 meter Media24 logo in black on its Heerengracht Street side.

A 16 x 14 meter digital display is located below the Media24 logo on the building's west side, featuring advertisements for Media24 publications, such as their numerous magazines.
