= ThirtyFour18 =

Building in Cape Town CBD

- Render of the proposed development
- Etymology: Approximate geographical coordinates of the building

General information
- Status: Proposed
- Type: Mixed-use high-rise
- Architectural style: Contemporary
- Location: 84 Heerengracht Street, Foreshore, Cape Town, South Africa
- Coordinates: 33.9170254°S 18.4269351°E
- Construction started: 22 April 2027; 5 months' time (planned)
- Completed: April 2031; 4 years' time (planned)
- Cost: R2.5 billion (estimated)

Technical details
- Floor count: 35
- Grounds: 1,680 m^{2}

Design and construction
- Developer: Indalo Hotels and Leisure Group (Afrirent Holdings)

Other information
- Public transit: MyCiTi Civic Center

ThirtyFour18 is a planned mixed-use skyscraper in Cape Town, South Africa, set to be developed in the city's CBD at a cost of R2.5 billion. The building will feature 35 floors, and has a target completion date of April 2031.

== Location ==
ThirtyFour18 is planned to be constructed on a 1,680 m^{2} site on Heerengracht Street in the Foreshore, beside Building 2 of the Cape Town International Convention Centre (CTICC). It will thus replace CTICC2's existing landscaped space to the northwest.

ThirtyFour18's name refers to its approximate geographic coordinates, at 34° south and 18° east.

== History ==
On 29 October 2026, an official project reveal was hosted at the CTICC, and attended by property investors, developers, industry stakeholders, and representatives of the City of Cape Town.

It was announced that the skyscraper was planned for development by Indalo Hotels and Leisure Group, a subsidiary of diversified investment holding company Afrirent Holdings, with a target completion date of April 2031. Originally, Afrirent estimated its investment would be in the range of R1 billion and R1.3 billion, however when the project launched, it confirmed that the estimate had expanded significantly to reach R2.5 billion. It was estimated that the project would create approximately 2,500 construction jobs and 400 permanent employment opportunities.

At the launch event, the city's Mayco Member for Economic Growth and Tourism James Vos emphasized the importance of creating an environment conducive to investment, and ensuring that valuable municipal land contributes to economic growth. He welcomed the project, and said it was an example of how strategically located City-owned property could be unlocked for private sector development.

In October 2026, the project's milestones were set to 1 December 2026 for the commencement of its marketing campaign, a broader public launch in January 2027, a target construction commencement date of 22 April 2027, and a target completion date of April 2031, after around four years of development.

== Features ==
The building is planned to be mixed-use, incorporating 101 luxury condos (including seven penthouses), a five-star hotel, prime-grade office space, and restaurants.

While the skyscraper's height is as yet unknown, if its goal of 35 floors is achieved, it will become one of Cape Town's tallest buildings by floor count.

== Development ==
Construction of the building is scheduled to commence in April 2027, subject to regulatory approvals, with completion targeted for April 2031.

The building is anticipated to use approximately 90 foundation piles, extending roughly 27 meters underground.
