= List of tallest buildings in Cape Town =

Portside Tower, on the corner of Buitengracht and Hans Strijdom Avenue, is the tallest building in Cape Town.

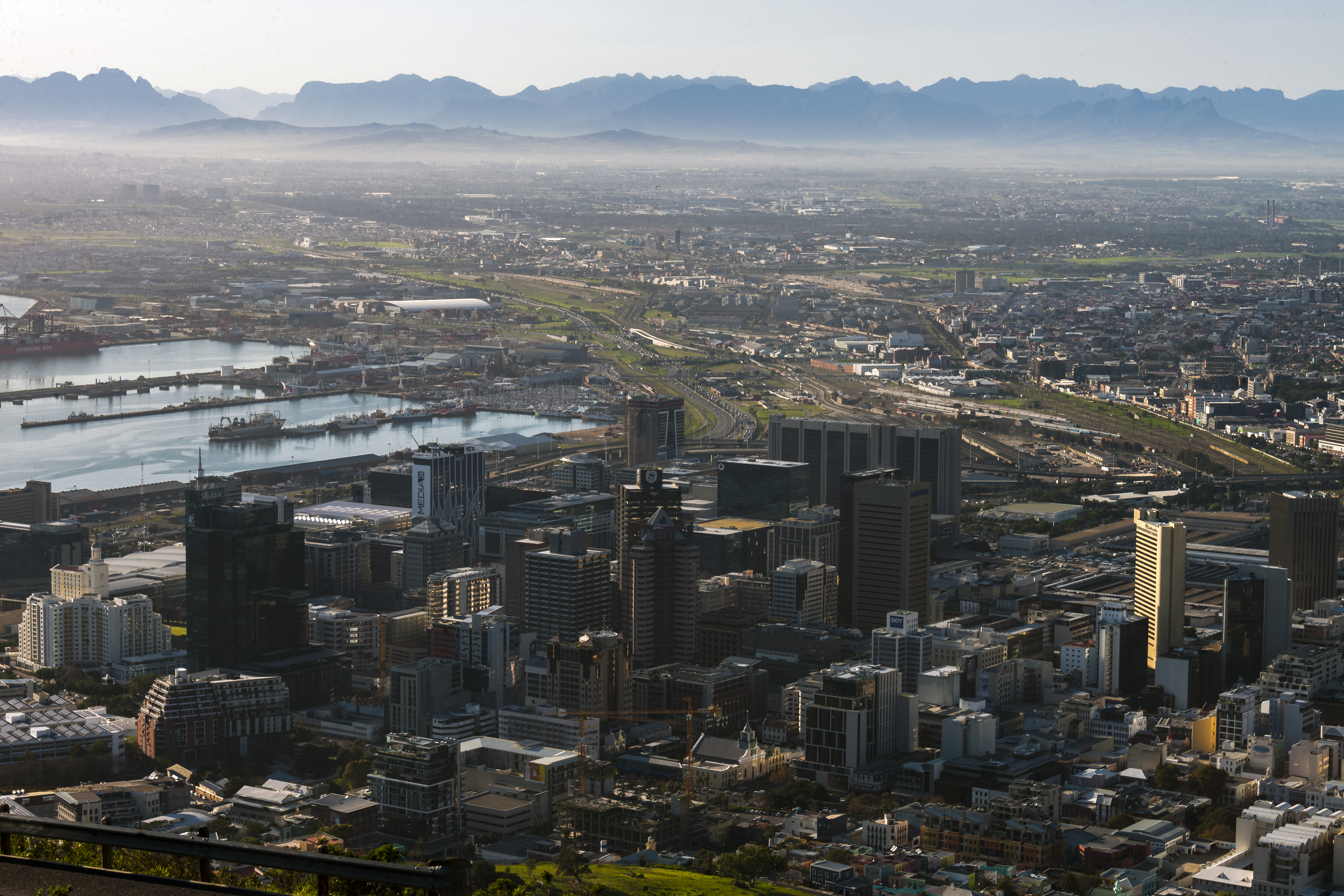
Cape Town CBD (center), and the Port of Cape Town (left), as seen from the summit of Signal Hill

This list of tallest buildings in Cape Town ranks completed buildings by height in the South African city of Cape Town, Western Cape, the second-largest city in South Africa by population.

The tallest buildings in Cape Town tend to be situated in Cape Town CBD, which is the economic center of the city, as well as one of its most densely populated suburbs.

The city features 10 buildings at a height of 100 meters or more.

Cape Town's tallest building is the Portside Tower, which stands at 139 m (456 ft); the tower was built in 2014 and was the first significant tall building erected in the central business district in 21 years.

Adjacent to Portside, 16 on Bree, standing at 118 m (387 ft) tall, is the city's second notable tall building in the financial district having been completed in March 2021.

Other tall buildings recently completed include the 35 Lower Long tower (2020), The Halyard (2019), and #1 Harbour Arch (2023) with a further new tower, The Rubik, which was completed in May 2024.

Site works have begun on The Fynbos (Africa's first biofilic building) in 2024 but was halted in mid 2025 due to slow sales of apartments and rising building costs.

The One on Bree (set to be Cape Town's second-tallest building at 131 metres) started construction in August 2025 and will be completed by late 2028. It will be a mixed-use building with a 505-room hotel, 270 residences and retail shops.

== Tallest buildings ==
This list ranks Cape Town's skyscrapers that stand at least 90 m (295 ft) tall, based on standard height measurement. This includes spires and architectural details, but does not include antenna masts.

Was the tallest building in Cape Town upon completion

Rank	Name	Image	Height m (ft)	Floors	Year completed	Purpose	Notes	Ref
1	Portside Tower		139 m (456 ft)	32	2014; 12 years ago	Mixed-use		
2	1 Thibault Square		126 m (413 ft)	32	1972; 54 years ago	Commercial		
3	16 on Bree	—	120 m (393 ft)	36	2021; 5 years ago	Residential (primarily)	Three retail tenants on the ground floor	
4	Metlife Centre (Hotel Sky)		119 m (390 ft)	28	1993; 33 years ago	Hotel		
5	Atterbury House		119 m (390 ft)	29	1976; 50 years ago	Commercial	Formerly named Shell House	
6	Foreshore Place		117 m (384 ft)	34	1970; 56 years ago	Commercial	Previously named ABSA Centre	
7	Golden Acre		108 m (354 ft)	28	1979; 47 years ago	Commercial		
8	Cape Sun Southern Sun		105 m (344 ft)	33	1982; 44 years ago	Hotel		
9	Triangle House		104 m (341 ft)	26	1993; 33 years ago	Hotel		
10	Provincial Legislature Building		101 m (331 ft)	26	1976; 50 years ago	Government	Seat of the Western Cape Government (provincial government)	
11	Civic Centre		98 m (322 ft)	26	1978; 48 years ago	Government	Seat of the City of Cape Town (metro government)	
12	#1 Harbour Arch	—	95 m (312 ft)	23	2023; 3 years ago	Residential		
13	2 Long Street		93 m (305 ft)	24	1970; 56 years ago	Hotel		
14	Media24 Centre		93 m (305 ft)	22	1962; 64 years ago	Commercial	Previously named Naspers Centre	
15	The Halyard	—	92 m (302 ft)	24	2019; 7 years ago	Commercial		
16	Cartwright's Corner	—	92 m (302 ft)	24	1969; 57 years ago	Mixed-use		
17	Mutual Heights		91 m (299 ft)	18	1939; 87 years ago	Residential	Formerly called the Mutual Building	
18	The Rubik	—	89 m (292 ft)	27	2024; 2 years ago	Mixed-use		
19	35 Lower Long	—	86 m (282 ft)	24	2020; 6 years ago	Commercial		

== Timeline of tallest buildings ==
The Mutual Building was the tallest building in Cape Town for 23 years, before it was overtaken by the Sanlam Centre (Media24 Centre) in 1962. After it was completed in 1972 and overtook the Trust Bank Centre (ABSA Centre) which is now called (The Foreshore Place) after being turned into a residential building, 1 Thibault Square (BP Centre) was the tallest building in the city for the next 42 years before Portside Tower was opened.

Before the completion of the Portside Tower, the 26-floor Safmarine Tower (Triangle House) was the last skyscraper to open its doors in the Mother City on completion in 1993. After the construction of the Portside Tower confidence in the construction of skyscrapers in Cape Town grew stronger and this saw the construction of a 118m (387ft) skyscraper called 16 on Bree. It is the tallest residential building in Cape Town.

Was Africa's tallest building upon completion – excluding Egyptian pyramids
Completion expected in 2026

Building	Height	Floors	Period as tallest	Number of years as tallest
Mutual Building	91 m (299 ft)	18	1939–1962	23 years
Media24 Centre	93 m (305 ft)	22	1962–1969	7 years
Cartwright's Corner	92 m (302 ft)	24	1969–1970	1 year
The Foreshore Place	117 m (384 ft)	34	1970–1972	2 years
1 Thibault Square	126 m (413 ft)	32	1972–2014	42 years
Portside Tower	139 m (456 ft)	32	2014–present	12 years

== Tallest under construction or planned ==
Building	Image	Height	Floors	Planned completion	Purpose	Notes	Ref
Zero-2-One		142.2 m (467 ft)	44	2026; 0 years ago	Mixed-use	Proposed	
One on Bree		131 m (430 ft)	41	2028; 2 years' time	Mixed-use	Under construction	
ThirtyFour18		TBA	35	April 2031; 4 years' time	Mixed-use	Planned	
The Madison		TBA	23	2027; 1 year's time	Residential	Under construction	
City Park		83.9 m (275 ft)	17	Q4 2025; 1 year ago	Mixed-use	Under construction	
