= Triangle House =

Skyscraper in Cape Town, South Africa

- Interactive map of the Triangle House area

General information
- Type: Commercial (formerly); Residential; Hotel
- Location: 22 Riebeek Street, Cape Town, South Africa
- Coordinates: 33°55′08″S 18°25′20″E
- Construction started: 1991
- Completed: 1993

Height
- Height: 104.09 metres (341.5 ft)

Technical details
- Floor count: 23

Triangle House, originally known as Safmarine House, is a 104-metre-tall (341-foot) building in Cape Town, South Africa. Construction work began in 1991 and it was completed in 1993 by Murray & Roberts Construction, now known as Concor at a cost of US$6,000,000 (equivalent to US$9,610,000 in 2018). it was the last skyscraper built in Cape Town until the completion of the Portside Tower 21 years later in 2014. The building was originally named after its first occupant, the South African shipping company Safmarine. The building was originally owned by Old Mutual Investment Group Property Investments. At the end of August 2023, the hotel component within the building was sold to the real estate private equity firm Kasada. The hotel is now operated by Accor (the French-listed hotel group) under the Pullman brand.

== Design & history ==
The cruciform building plan gives each of the eighteen to nineteen units on each floor added natural light, ventilation and views. The exterior of the building is clad in Rosa Duna granite, Rock Face granite and Rustenberg granite.

In 2017 the building was renovated converting its office space into 166 residences and a 5-star Radisson Blu Hotel by Signatura Property Group and Carlson Rezidor Hotel Group costing R1 billion. The hotel rooms are based on the ground floor to the 11th floor. Residential apartments are based on the 12th to the 23rd floor. In August 2023 the Radisson Blu Hotel and Residence was permanently closed and the hotel is now operating as Pullman hotel. This is after the hotel was sold to Kasada who bought, renamed, and brought in Accor, the French hotel group to operate the hotel. The decor of the hotel's aesthetic, lobby, restaurants, and rooms have all remained the same.
