= The Madison (Cape Town) =

High rise building in Cape Town

- Render of the tower

General information
- Status: Under construction
- Type: Residential high-rise
- Architectural style: Contemporary
- Location: 142 Bree Street, Cape Town CBD, Cape Town, South Africa
- Coordinates: 33°55′2.676″S 18°25′19.488″E
- Groundbreaking: November 2024; 2 years ago
- Construction started: 2027; 1 year's time (est.)
- Completed: 2029; 3 years' time (est.)
- Cost: R1.95 billion

Height
- Height: TBA

Technical details
- Material: Reinforced concrete
- Floor count: 23
- Lifts/elevators: 2+

Design and construction
- Architecture firm: dhk Architects; Fabian Architects
- Developer: Tricolt Group
- Other designers: Attik Design (interior designers)
- Main contractor: Tiber Construction

Other information
- Parking: Basement
- Public transit: Longmarket MyCiTi

Website
- themadison.co.za

The Madison is a 23-story residential high-rise building under construction in Cape Town, South Africa. It is planned to include 391 luxury condos.

The building, which is being developed by Tricolt Group in Cape Town CBD at a cost of R1.95 billion, has an estimated completion date of mid-2029.

The Madison's height has yet to be publicly announced, but in relation to existing buildings, its floor count could place it amongst the top 20 tallest buildings in Cape Town.

== History ==
Redevelopment of 142 Bree Street was originally planned to consist of a 689-unit, 24-floor residential tower called The Fynbos, developed at a cost of R1.2 billion by Lurra Capital and Gardner Property Solutions, in partnership with Avantegarde Development. Condos were to be priced from R1.1 million for studios to R4.29 million for 2-bedroom units. Construction for the building began in 2023.

However, in June 2025, it was reported that The Fynbos had been cancelled. Developer Lurra Capital cited a change in strategic direction. Development of the site was handed over to Tricolt Group, who planned to entirely reimagine the building.

Sales for condos in The Madison launched on 29 July 2026. By midnight on launch day, 272 off-plan sales were recorded, for a total of R1.25 billion. The developer stated that this represented the highest sales value ever recorded during the launch of a residential property development in SA.

Prices ranged from R2.65 million for 28m² studios to R17.19 million for 176 m^{2} 3-bedroom penthouses, placing the condos firmly within Cape Town's luxury housing market. On 4 August 2026, 72% of the units had been sold.

== Location ==
The building is situated at 142 Bree Street, in Cape Town's central business district, surrounded by dense commercial and residential infrastructure. The Madison occupies a full city block, bounded by Bree, Buitengracht, Dorp, and Leeuwen Streets.

The site is located approximately 19km from the Cape Town International, 6km from Table Mountain, 2km from the CTICC, 6km from the Camps Bay Beach, and close to the Iziko Bo-Kaap Museum and Kloof Street shopping district.

The building's neighbors include the offices of the National Prosecuting Authority, the Cape Town Lodge Hotel, and the Manhattan Place and 35 Wale Street commercial buildings.

== Features and tenants ==
The Madison is intended to be a predominantly residential building, and will feature 391 luxury condos of various sizes, ranging from studios to 3-bedroom penthouses. The site will also include some retail space.

The split of condo sizes is as follows; 93 studios, 222 1-bedroom units, 55 2-bedroom units, and 21 penthouses (a mix of 2- and 3-bedroom units).

Residents have access to an outlet of US chain Gold's Gym, which is located within the building. Other amenities include a restaurant, pool, bar, and coworking space.

== Design ==
The building was designed with sustainability in mind, and features off-grid water and power backup systems, and EV charging bays.

== See also ==
- List of tallest buildings in Cape Town
- Cape Town CBD
- Housing in South Africa
