= Equites (disambiguation) =

Equites may refer to:

== Rome ==
- Equites, a social class in ancient Rome

== Commerce ==
- Equites (company), a major Cape Town-based real estate investment trust (REIT)
