= Atterbury House =

Office skyscraper in Cape Town, South Africa

- Atterbury House with its current Luno branding

General information
- Status: Completed
- Type: Commercial
- Architectural style: Modern
- Location: Cape Town, South Africa
- Coordinates: 33.9202349°S 18.4229172°E
- Completed: 1976; 50 years ago
- Owner: Atterbury Property

Height
- Architectural: 127m

Technical details
- Floor count: 29

Design and construction
- Architect: Louis Karol Architects

Atterbury House, formerly known as Shell House, is a 127m, 29-story commercial skyscraper in Cape Town CBD, in the city of Cape Town, South Africa.

Atterbury house's prominent exterior signage has featured branding for various companies over the years, including FNB, Samsung, and, currently, Luno.

== History ==
At the time it was completed in 1976, it was the second-tallest building in Cape Town, after the 129m 1 Thibault Square. As of 2026, Atterbury House is the city's fifth-tallest building.

On 12 June 2013, Ascension Properties bought the building for R341 million, equivalent to an acquisition yield of 8.7% at that time.

== Tenants ==
The building has had numerous notable tenants, including Metropolitan Health, the Department of Public Works, the Department of Education, the Department of Mineral and Energy Affairs, and the Office of the Premier.

== See also ==
- List of tallest buildings in Cape Town
