= Good Hope Centre =

Exhibition hall and conference centre in Cape Town

Coordinates: 33°55′35″S 18°25′52″E

General information
- Type: Conference center
- Architectural style: Modernist, reinforced concrete
- Location: 11 Sir Lowry Road, Foreshore, Cape Town CBD, Cape Town, South Africa
- Current tenants: None
- Inaugurated: 1977; 49 years ago
- Renovated: TBD (redevelopment tender process planned for 2026)
- Owner: The City of Cape Town
- Landlord: The City of Cape Town

Height
- Roof: Domed

Technical details
- Grounds: 2.48 hectares

Design and construction
- Architect: Pier Luigi Nervi
- Known for: Being Cape Town's original main conference center

Other information
- Parking: Above and below ground

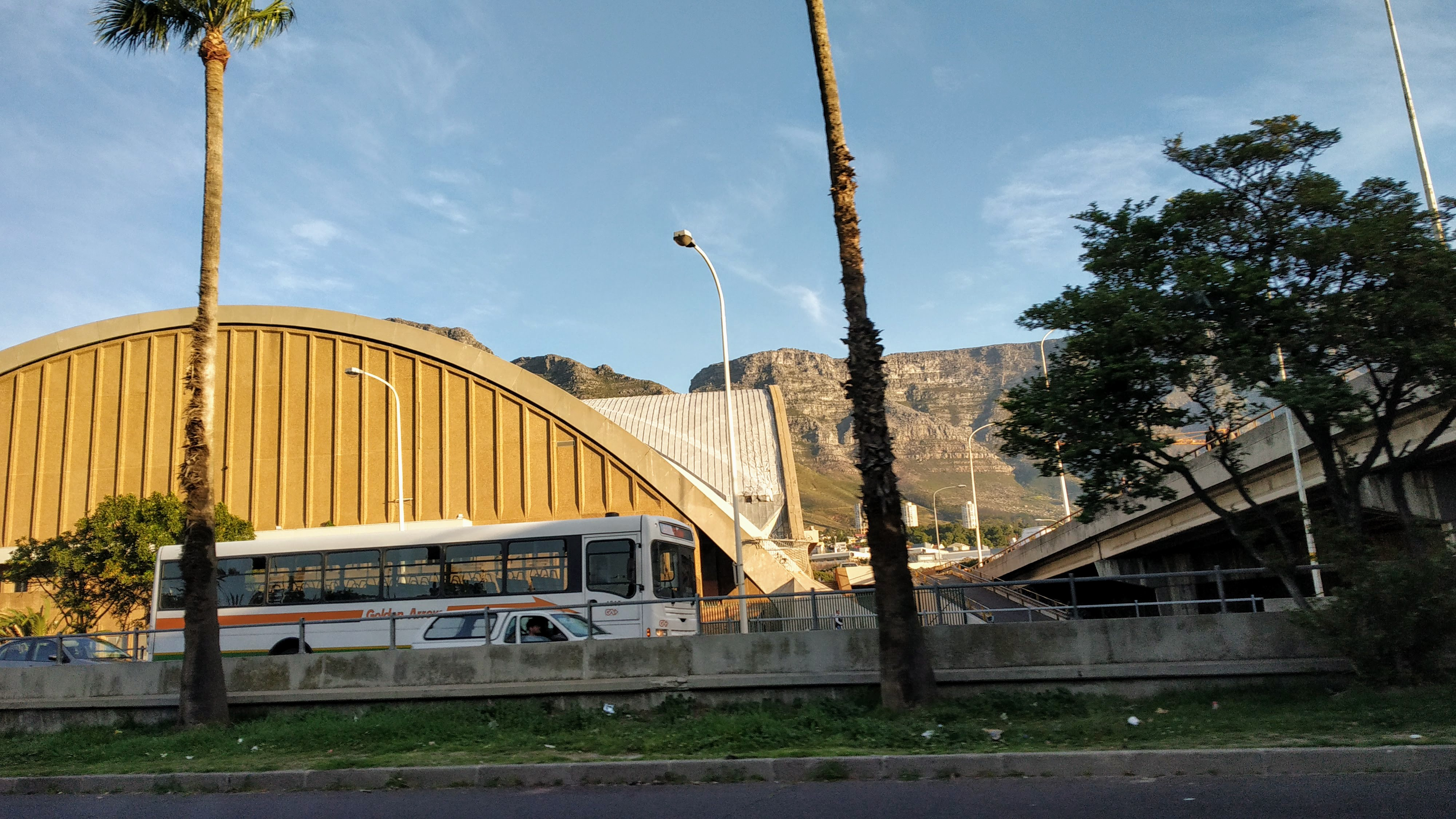
The Good Hope Centre, viewed from Newmarket Street in Foreshore

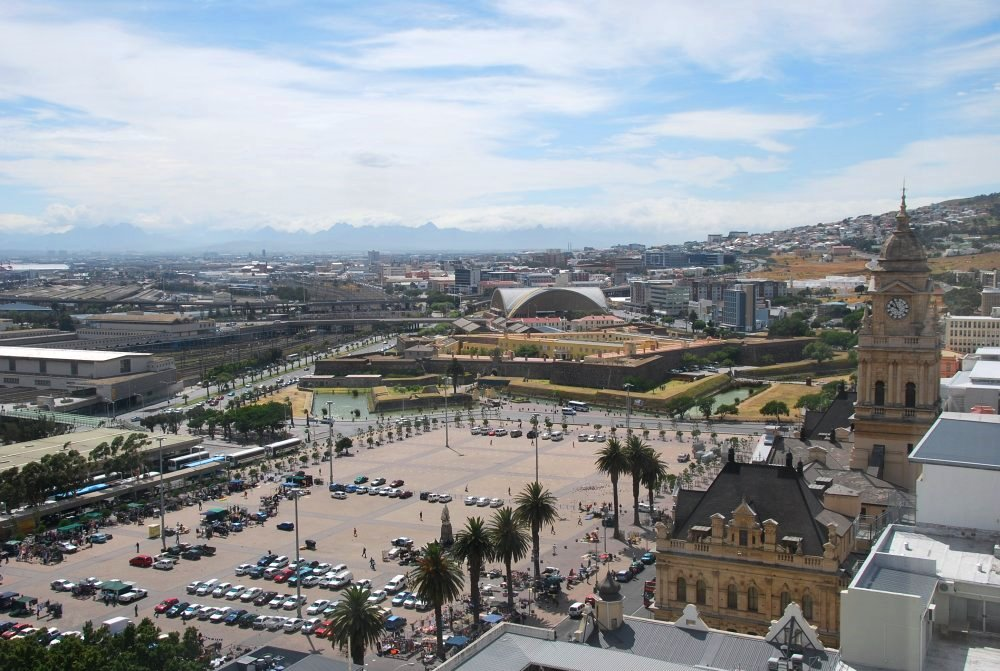
The Good Hope Centre (middle), viewed from the Mutual Building

The Good Hope Centre is a defunct exhibition hall and conference centre in Cape Town, South Africa. It is located on the corner of Sir Lowry Road and Christiaan Barnard Street, in the Foreshore region of Cape Town CBD.

The Centre's business was subsumed over time by the more modern Cape Town International Convention Centre (CTICC), as well as conference facilities in Century City. As of February 2026, a tender process is planned for the same year, to begin completely redeveloping the precinct in which the building stands. This follows approval having been granted by the City of Cape Town for the project to move ahead.

== History ==
The Good Hope Centre was designed in 1976, and inaugurated in 1977. At the time it was constructed, its precast concrete roof cross-vault was the largest in the world.

Since the 2010s, the Centre has lost popularity, has barely been used as a hosting venue, and has fallen into a state of disrepair. This has in large part been due to the opening of the larger, more modern, and better-located Cape Town International Convention Centre (CTICC), which completed construction in 2003, with significant investment from the City of Cape Town.

In 2015, it was announced that the Good Hope Centre, which had become defunct, would be leased as a temporary film studio, to raise funds and boost employment.

In November 2024, the City stated that the Good Hope Centre was leased on a monthly basis, and generated total revenue of R520,000 per month.

=== Redevelopment plans ===
In November 2025, the City of Cape Town Mayoral Committee (Mayco) granted in-principle approval for the redevelopment of the Good Hope Centre precinct.

At the time of the approval, the redevelopment was awaiting full approval from the City Council. Once this was secured, the property would be sold at a public auction, planned for early 2026, and managed by City-appointed auctioneer Claremart.

The Centre is located within a designated City of Cape Town Development Focus Area (DFA), in the Table Bay District Plan. It forms part of the City’s Consolidated Land Pipeline and Release Program (IDP 2022–2027). According to the City of Cape Town, the building's proximity to the CBD (the city's main economic hub), as well as major transit corridors and District Six.

In December 2025, the City signed an agreement with the national Department of Public Works and Infrastructure (DPWI), in which the City of Cape Town transferred ownership of parcels of land in the area around the Houses of Parliament, in exchange for parcels of land previously owned by the DPWI situated within the Good Hope Centre precinct.

Possible use cases suggested for the new precinct include residential, retail, and commercial buildings.

=== Auction ===
The City of Cape Town auctioned off the Good Hope Centre, along with 52 other properties it owned, in late February 2026.

In March 2026, it was reported that Nigerian evangelical pastor John Anosike intended to purchase the building for R135 million, and use it as a place of worship. While the pastor claimed his bid was successful, the City said it had not finalized anything.

In July 2026, the Mayor of Cape Town said that it did not seem that the deal with the original buyer (winning bidder) would proceed, due to a failure of financial checks. The Mayor said the next bidder in line intended to purchase the property for R130 million and use it as a mosque. He also said that that proposal included a social housing component.

== Design ==
The Good Hope Centre was designed in 1976 by Italian engineer and architect Pier Luigi Nervi, who is considered to have been one of the masters of 20th-century reinforced concrete structures.

The exhibition hall comprises an arch with a tie-beam on each of its four vertical facades, and two diagonal arches supporting two intersecting barrel-like roofs. These roofs were constructed from pre-cast concrete triangular coffers, with in-situ concrete beams on the edges.

== Construction ==
The main contractor for the Centre was Murray and Stewart. Consulting engineers KFD Wilkinson and Partners were local agents for Studio Nervi. Depropping of the entire structure was carried out during December 1976. Murray and Stewart published a postcard showing 18 tower cranes at their sites in Cape Town that same year.

== Features ==
The exhibition centre offers a range of spaces and a total of 4,500 square metres of floorspace. As a sports arena, the venue has a maximum capacity of 7,000 people.

The building is listed as a Grade 3B heritage resource.

== Events ==
Year	Event
1991	The RSA Games for Quad Roller Hockey for Ladies and Men
1986	The Good Hope Concerts
1994	Exotic Tour/Summer Tour '94, Depeche Mode tour
1996	WWF Tour to South Africa
1997	World Junior Weightlifting Championships
1999	Parliament of the World's Religions (one of various locations for the conference)
2000–2003	Cape Town International Jazz Festival
2003–2004	WWE Tour to South Africa
2004	KSI World Karate Championships
2007	ITTF World Cadet Challenge and World Junior Circuit Finals
2008	World Rope Skipping Championships
2012	World University Netball Championship

== See also ==
- Cape Town International Convention Centre
