= Zero-2-One =

Building in Cape Town CBD

Zero-2-One Tower

General information
- Type: Mixed-use high-rise
- Location: 2 Adderley Street, Cape Town, South Africa
- Coordinates: 33°55′17″S 18°25′23″E
- Completed: 2026 (estimated)

Height
- Height: 148 metres (486 ft)

Technical details
- Floor count: 42
- Floor area: 44,000 m^{2}

Design and construction
- Architect: FWJK
- Quantity surveyor: FWJK

Website
- fwjk.co.za/zero-2-one

Zero-2-One Tower will be a 148-metre-tall (486 ft) mixed-use (residential and commercial) building in Cape Town, South Africa. It is currently in the planning stages of development by FWJK and upon completion will have 624 apartments, 760 parking bays and 6,000 m^{2} of retail space.

Once completed, it will be the tallest building in Cape Town, replacing the current first-place Portside Tower.

== Affordable housing ==
Public housing advocacy group Ndifuna Ukwazi disputed the building's design arguing that no allowance for affordable housing had been made in the original plans which was problematic given South Africa's housing shortage.

In August 2017, FWJK stated that 104 of the building's apartments would be made available for affordable housing each retailing at under R800,000 which Ndifuna Ukwazi argued was too expensive for the majority of Captonians.

Approval for the building was granted in 2018 by the City of Cape Town after it was agreed that 20 percent (240 apartments) of the residential units would be reserved for affordable housing. The building developer FWJK appealed the ruling for the affordable housing reservation.

In 2019, it was reported that the development had secured funding through foreign direct investment, as it was not able to secure R1 billion in funding from local banks. FWJK said the building intended to commence with construction within three to four months, provided it obtained foreign funding approval from the Reserve Bank. The developer said the building would create 3,000 new on- and off-site jobs. At the time, the building was planned to include 570 condos and 7,000 sqm of retail space.
