= Metlife Centre =

Building in Cape Town

- Interactive map of the Metlife Centre area

General information
- Type: Business
- Architectural style: Modern architecture
- Location: 7 Walter Sisulu Avenue, Cape Town, South Africa
- Coordinates: 33°54′59″S 18°25′34″E
- Completed: 1993

Height
- Height: 120 metres (390 ft)
- Antenna spire: 22 m
- Roof: 95.7m

Technical details
- Floor count: 28

The Metlife Centre is a 28-floor, 120 meter skyscraper in Cape Town, South Africa. Construction work on the skyscraper was completed in 1993. The building will be converted into a residential complex which will be named The Sky Hotel 3. Work to renovate the building began at the beginning of 2020.

At 120 meters high and 28 levels, the Metlife Centre is the third tallest building in Cape Town. Its summit antenna was installed with the help of a helicopter by uniting the three parts into which it was divided.

The skyscraper has been defined by Emporis as one of the most famous and distinctive in Cape Town.

== See also ==
- List of tallest buildings in Cape Town
- List of tallest buildings in Africa
