= One on Bree =

High rise building in Cape Town

General information
- Status: Under construction
- Type: Mixed-use skyscraper
- Architectural style: Contemporary
- Location: 1 Bree Street, Cape Town CBD, Cape Town, South Africa
- Coordinates: 33°55′13.834″S 18°25′7.56″E
- Groundbreaking: 2025; 1 year ago
- Completed: 2028; 2 years' time (est.)
- Cost: R1.1 billion

Height
- Height: 131 meters

Technical details
- Floor count: 41
- Floor area: 66,000 m2

Design and construction
- Architecture firm: vivid architects
- Developer: Acsion
- Quantity surveyor: MFP Group
- Main contractor: Anastasi Construction

One on Bree is a 131-metre-tall (430 ft) mixed-use building under construction in Cape Town, South Africa. The building, which is being developed at a cost of R1.1 billion and has an estimated completion date of 2028, is set to feature 279 condos and a 500-room hotel.

Situated in Cape Town CBD - the city's economic hub - the tower is set to become Cape Town's second-tallest building, just behind Portside Tower. The two buildings are located next to one another. One on Bree will also become the city's 11th skyscraper.

== History ==
In the 2000s, South African real estate companies, Redefine and SA Reit, intended to build an 18-storey office tower on the site, at a cost of R600 million. Paragon Architects designed the building. Construction was scheduled to begin in 2008, and be completed by 2010. However, the building never materialized.

In 2010, a new render was revealed, with an entirely redesigned building, featuring more adaptable spaces and enhanced integration with the local environment. The final design, chosen for construction, was a mixture of all previous renders.

In 2025, after the site had stood almost empty for over a decade, One on Bree received Building Development Management (BDM) approval, and preparation for its construction began.

== Location ==
The tower will be located on prime real estate in Cape Town's central business district, surrounded by dense commercial and residential infrastructure.

The site is located approximately 2km from the V&A Waterfront, 5km from Table Mountain, 2km from the Port of Cape Town, 2km from District Six, 1.5km from the Houses of Parliament, and close to the intersection where the N1 freeway enters the CBD.

The building's neighbors include finance corporations First National Bank and Ninety One, the Icon Luxury Apartments, property development company FWJK (in Touchstone House), and the 16 on Bree residential tower.

== Features and tenants ==
One on Bree is intended to be a mixed-use development, and will feature 500 hotel rooms, 279 condos, and 4,000 m2 of retail space.

== Design ==
The building's architects integrated the historic design of the previous building on the site with a glass façade.

== Planning and construction ==
In 2025, the building moved from the design to the tender phase. It also received its Building Development Management (BDM) approval, and parts of the old structure on the tower's site began to be dismantled.

Construction work on the tower has yet to begin.

== See also ==
- List of tallest buildings in Cape Town
