= Cape Town Civic Centre =

Headquarters of the City of Cape Town Metropolitan Municipality

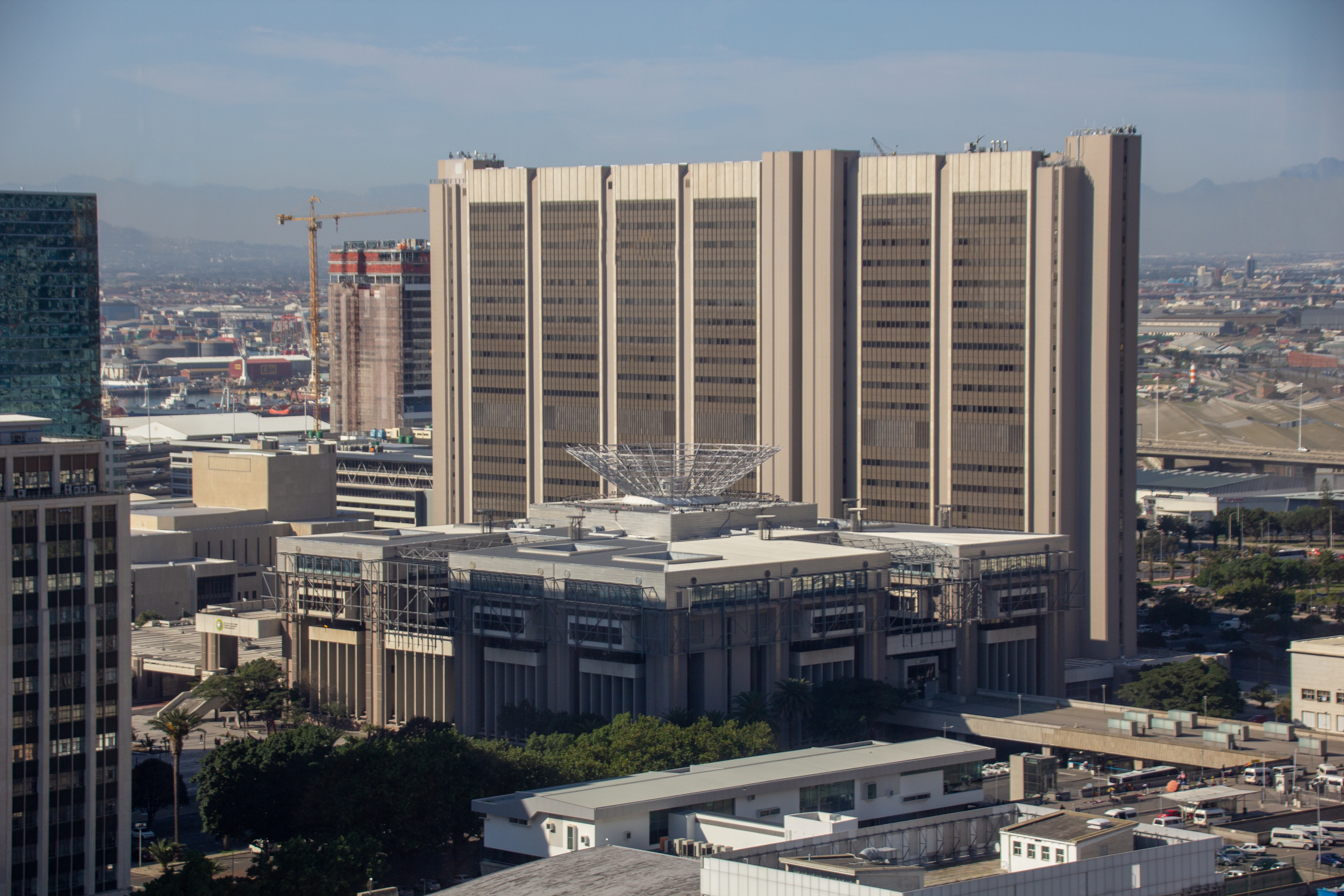
- The Civic Centre in 2018, viewed from a north-westerly vantage, across Cape Town CBD. The high-rise and the building in front of it are both part of the Civic Centre

- Location within Cape Town

General information
- Type: High-rise
- Architectural style: Modernist
- Location: 12 Hertzog Boulevard, Cape Town, Western Cape, South Africa
- Coordinates: 33.921°S 18.429°E
- Current tenants: City of Cape Town
- Completed: 1978; 48 years ago
- Owner: City of Cape Town

Height
- Height: 98 m (322 ft)

Technical details
- Floor count: 26

The Cape Town Civic Centre, often referred to simply as the Civic Centre, is a 26 story high-rise building in the Foreshore area of Cape Town, South Africa.

Constructed in 1978, the building serves as the headquarters of the City of Cape Town; the metropolitan municipality that governs the city. It houses civil servants, as well as the Office of the Mayor of Cape Town.

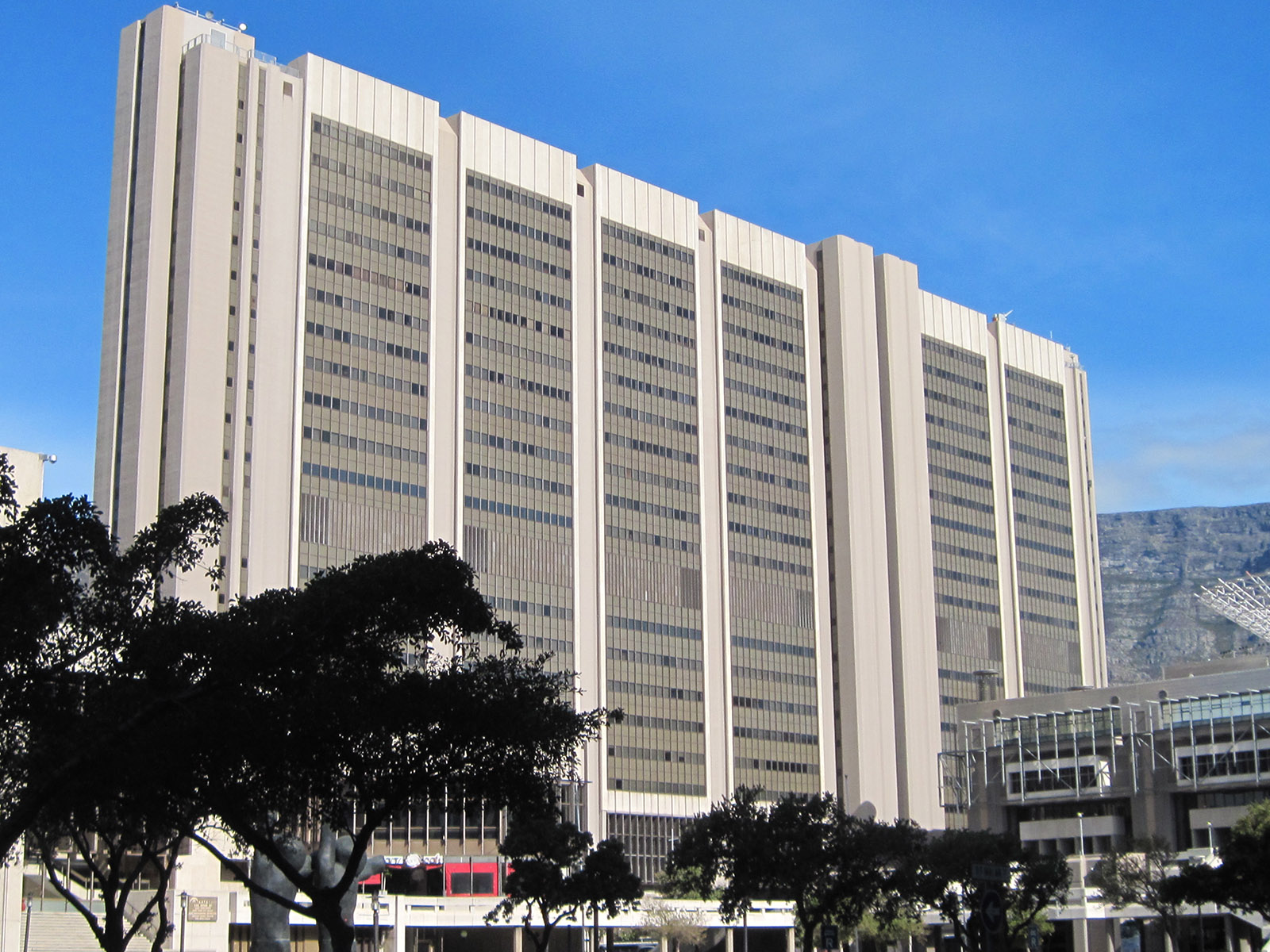
Northern side of the building

Southern side of the building, from Hertzog Boulevard

== Location ==
The building is located on Hertzog Boulevard in the Foreshore, a suburb that sits next to Cape Town CBD – the main economic hub of the city. The Civic Centre is opposite an onramp to Nelson Mandela Boulevard, which forms part of the N2 freeway; one of South Africa's the major national roads.

To its north is part of the MyCiTi BRT Civic Centre station, as well as The Towers, a commercial building containing tenants including Standard Bank and the Taipei Liaison Office. To its east is Cape Town Station, the city's main rail hub. To the building's west is the Artscape Theatre. To its south is an open air parking lot, and the other part of the MyCiTi station, which runs underneath the Civic Centre alongside Hertzog Boulevard.

== History ==
The Civic Centre was completed in 1978 by South African construction and mining services company Concor.

In 2011, a major refurbishment project commenced at the Civic Centre. The project was awarded to specialist contractors GVK-Siya Zama, and cost R28.8 million. Components of the refurbishment included cleaning, installing new skylights, re-waterproofing, and modernizing both buildings with a new shade of paint, as well as re-waterproofing the links between the buildings. The project took 11 months, and was completed in June 2012.

In 2015, a large mural of anti-apartheid activist and former South African President Nelson Mandela was installed across the upper windows of one of the Civic Centre's tower columns. This was followed by a similar mural of fellow activist Desmond Tutu on a column to the right, in 2017.

In 2022, the building's murals were reimagined. Cape Town artist Linsey Levendall and design agency Dreamfuel Media reconceptualized the murals to comprise various imagery of special significance to Cape Town. Levendall's illustrations feature imagery of, among others, Table Mountain, Boulders Beach, the Bo Kaap and a King Protea. The new murals replaced the old vinyl, which only had a lifespan of three years. The revamp project took three weeks.

The new murals span an area of 14 windows wide and 32 windows long, covering 448 windows and 12 floors in total. At the unveiling, Cape Town Mayor Geordin Hill-Lewis said that the iconic artworks invite Capetonians to enact the values of Nelson Mandela and Desmond Tutu, while going about their daily lives, by building and maintaining a free, fair, prosperous, and non-racial city.

Hill-Lewis further stated that the murals had the goal of instilling a sense of hope in the city, and optimism about the country’s future, celebrating the beauty of its diverse people and environment.

In May 2026, the City stated its Mayco had approved a plan to redevelop the large surface parking lot next to the Civic Centre into a mixed-use development, featuring residential, commercial, retail, and public spaces. Mayco recommended that the lot be released by the City in part to create affordable housing, as part of a broader pipeline of 12,000 affordable units.

The redevelopment is expected to provide the City with sale income of R230 million, along with R50 million in annual rates and services revenue. It is also projected to generate R1.5 billion in private sector investment for the CBD. With Mayco approval, the report would head to Council for approval. If approved, the City would facilitate a formal public participation process.

== Structure ==
The Civic Centre comprises two blocks; Podium Block (in front) and Tower Block (behind).

Podium Block is a low-rise building which houses the City management, including the Council Chamber and the Mayor's Office.

The Tower Block is a 98-metre-tall, 26-floor high-rise building that houses the administrative offices of the municipality. It is a long, narrow structure that crosses Hertzog Boulevard, with the road's multiple lanes passing directly underneath the central part of the building, between columns.

The Civic Centre is the 11th tallest building in Cape Town.

== Transit ==
The MyCiTi bus rapid transit system's Civic Centre Station trunk is located along Hertzog Boulevard, beneath the Civic Centre's Tower Block.

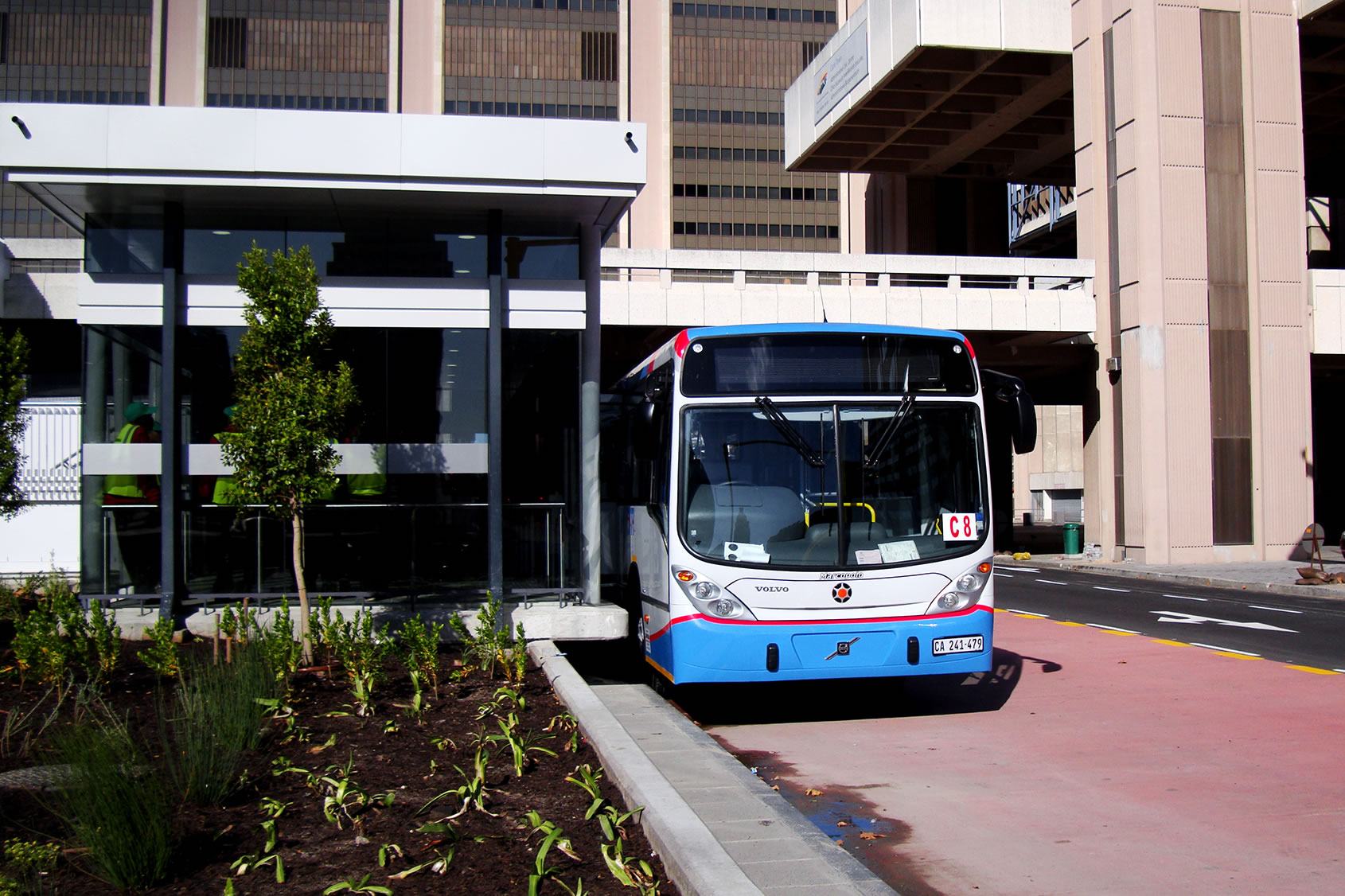
MyCiTi bus outside the Civic Centre
