= Equites (company) =

South African real estate investment trust

- Type: Public
- Traded as: JSE: EQU
- ISIN: ZAE000188843
- Industry: Real estate
- Incorporated: 2013; 13 years ago
- Founded: 2014; 12 years ago
- Headquarters: Cape Town, South Africa
- Area served: South Africa; United Kingdom
- Key people: Andrew Taverna-Turisan (CEO)
- Services: Logistics property investment and development
- Operating income: ▲ R2.02 billion (2026)
- Net income: ▲ R1.63 billion (2026)
- Total assets: ▲ R31.4 billion (2026)
- Total equity: ▲ R18.42 billion (2026)
- Rating: AA-(ZA) (GCR, 2026)
- Website: equites.co.za

Equites, officially Equites Property Fund Limited, is a South African property developer and real estate investment trust (REIT), specializing in the logistics industry. It is the only specialist REIT listed on the JSE.

Headquartered in Cape Town, the company was founded in 2014. As of 2026, Equites has 59 logistics-related properties in its global portfolio, worth a combined R28.7 billion.

== History ==
Equites was founded in 2013, through the merger of three independent Western Cape-based industrial property developers.

In June 2014, Equites listed on the JSE Limited. At the time, it had a property portfolio with a total value of R1 billion.

In 2015, Equites acquired the Intaprop portfolio for a sum of R1.9 billion.

In 2016, the company completed its first contracted development, which consisted of a 26,000 m² distribution warehouse for clothing and homeware retail chain TFG. The warehouse was built in Midrand, Gauteng, at a cost of R150 million.

That same year, Equites made its first acquisition outside SA when it acquired a Tesco distribution facility in Hinckley, England, for approximately R493 million. The facility's lease had 7.5 years remaining at the time of the acquisition.

In 2017, Equites was included for the first time in the FTSE/JSE South African Property Index (SAPY), a subset of the FTSE/JSE All-Share Index. The SAPY consists of the 20 largest JSE-listed real estate companies by market capitalization. At the time, Equites had a market cap of around R8.5 billion.

In 2020, Equites concluded two major agreements. The first was the acquisition of a 50.1% shareholding in three distribution centers from South Africa's largest supermarket chain, Shoprite Holdings, for R3.2 billion. The lease period for these was 20 years. The second agreement was a strategic joint venture with UK-based Newlands Property Developments, which enabled Equites to finalize its first development and lease agreement with ecommerce company Amazon later that same year. The Amazon agreement was for a Peterborough-based last mile distribution facility, with an approximately R694 million development cost and 15 year lease.

In 2021, the company had reached a total property portfolio value of just under R20 billion.

Also in 2021, Equites formed a joint venture with the Eskom Pension and Provident Fund (EPPF) to acquire the DSV logistics campus. The deal was worth R2.05 billion, with Equites holding 51% and EPPF 49% of the shares.

That same year, the company completed a super-hub distribution facility in Barnsley, UK, which was leased to Evri on a 20 year triple-net lease. The development cost was around R1.48 billion.

In October 2026, Equites confirmed that it would accelerate its SA investment after largely exiting the UK. The company sold its Aviva portfolio, consisting of five UK assets worth approximately R4.4 billion combined. Equites said logistics property demand in SA was being driven by retailers upgrading supply chains, third party logistics providers increasing fulfilment capacity due to the growth of ecommerce, and FMCG companies developing more modern, efficient facilities.

That same month, it was reported that around 98% of Equites' revenue was derived from A-grade multinationals, large listed corporates, and government counterparties. Major clients included Shoprite Holdings, which accounted for 22% of total revenue, and DSV Solutions, which accounted for a further 16%. Other large clients at the time were TFG, Digistics, DHL, and PepsiCo.

== Operations ==
Equites' assets are focused on logistics nodes near large population centers and major transport links. The group focuses on big box distribution centers. Locations of preference for the company are Cape Town and Gauteng in SA, as well as the Midlands and last mile fulfilment centers near major settlements in the United Kingdom.

The company is headquartered in Portside Tower, Cape Town, and maintains an office in Linbro Park, Gauteng.

As of August 2026, Equites' subsidiaries include:

Company	Shareholding	Incorporation
Chamber Lane Properties 3 (Pty) Ltd	100%	South Africa
Dormell Properties 711 (Pty) Ltd	100%	South Africa
EA Waterfall Logistics JV (Pty) Ltd	100%	South Africa
Equites (Basingstoke) Ltd	100%	United Kingdom
Equites Atlantic Hills (Pty) Ltd	100%	South Africa
Equites International Ltd	100%	Isle of Man
Equites Investments 1 (Pty) Ltd	100%	South Africa
Equites Newlands (Hoyland) Ltd	100%	United Kingdom
Equites Newlands (Hoyland Plot 2) Ltd	100%	United Kingdom
Equites Newlands (Rugby) Ltd	100%	United Kingdom
Equites Newlands (Thrapston East) Ltd	60%	United Kingdom
Equites Newlands (Thrapston Plot 1) Ltd	60%	United Kingdom
Equites Newlands (Thrapston Plot 2) Ltd	60%	United Kingdom
Equites Newlands (Thrapston Plot 3) Ltd	60%	United Kingdom
Equites Newlands (Thrapston Plot 4) Ltd	60%	United Kingdom
Equites Newlands (Thrapston Plot 5) Ltd	60%	United Kingdom
Equites Newlands Group Ltd	60%	United Kingdom
Equites Newlands (Land) Ltd	60%	United Kingdom
Equites Park Basingstoke Management Company Ltd	100%	United Kingdom
Equites Park (Thrapston East) Management Company Ltd	100%	United Kingdom
Equites Peterborough Gateway Ltd	100%	United Kingdom
Equites Property Management Services (Pty) Ltd	100%	South Africa
Equites Tridevco (Pty) Ltd	100%	South Africa
Equites UK Developer Ltd	100%	United Kingdom
Equites UK SPV 1 Ltd	100%	Isle of Man
Equites UK SPV 5 Ltd	100%	Isle of Man
Equites UK SPV 12 Ltd	100%	Isle of Man
Galt Property One (Pty) Ltd	100%	South Africa
Galt Property Two (Pty) Ltd	100%	South Africa
Kovacs Investments 715 (Pty) Ltd	100%	South Africa
Plumbago Investment Platform (Pty) Ltd	51%	South Africa
Plumbago Logistics Platform (Pty) Ltd	100%	South Africa
Retail Logistics Fund (RF) (Pty) Ltd	50.1%	South Africa
Swish Property Seven (Pty) Ltd	100%	South Africa

=== Property investments ===
As of May 2025, logistics properties in Equites' portfolio valued at over R500 million each were:

Property	Location	Gross leasable area (GLA)	Value February 2025	Ref.
Plumbago Campus	Kempton Park, Gauteng	144,213m²	R2.44 billion	
Centurion 1	Centurion, Gauteng	178,231m²	R1.88 billion	
Equites Park – Riverfields 5	Kempton Park, Gauteng	93,512m²	R1.46 billion	
Brackenfell 2	Brackenfell, Western Cape	140,048m²	R1.46 billion	
Wells Estate	Gqeberha, Eastern Cape	99,288m²	R1.36 billion	
Canelands Campus	Verulam, KwaZulu-Natal	101,944m²	R1.14 billion	
Brackenfell 1	Brackenfell, Western Cape	109,568m²	R894 million	
Equites Park – Riverfields 4	Kempton Park, Gauteng	51,429m²	R681 million	
Equites Park – Meadowview 8	Linbro Park, Gauteng	28,459m²	R515 million	

== Corporate social responsibility ==
Equites has committed to becoming a net-zero carbon emissions company by 2040, in line with the SBTi's Corporate Net-Zero Standard.

In 2020, Equites concluded an R800 million sustainability-linked debt facility with Standard Bank, with a focus on sustainable building practices, renewable energy usage, and enterprise and supplier development.

As of 2026, Equites' logistics facilities are built in line with IFC EDGE Advanced certification standards in South Africa. Across all of its facilities, Equites has installed a total of 27.9MW of solar PV power generation capacity.

== See also ==
- Logistics in South Africa
