= 1 Thibault Square =

Building in Cape Town, South Africa

- Location within Cape Town

General information
- Type: Commercial
- Architectural style: Modernist
- Location: 1 Thibault Square, Long & Hans Strydom Street, Cape Town, South Africa
- Coordinates: 33°55′08″S 18°25′24″E
- Construction started: 1969
- Completed: 1972
- Owner: Zenprop

Height
- Roof: 126.5 meters

Technical details
- Floor count: 35, 32 above ground
- Floor area: over 36,000 m/sq
- Lifts/elevators: 12

Design and construction
- Architecture firm: Fox Revel and Partners
- Structural engineer: Ove Arup & Partners
- Main contractor: Murray and Roberts

1 Thibault Square, formerly known as the LG Building, and originally as the BP Centre, is a 126.5-metre (415 ft) modernist skyscraper on the European-style Thibault Square at the end of St George's Mall, Cape Town, South Africa.

Work on the building began in 1969 and was completed in 1972. As of 2025 it is the second tallest building in Cape Town. The 34-degree diagonal twist, which puts it on a north–south axis, reduces sun loads on the façades, thereby reducing pressure on the air-conditioning system. To further shield the façades, a pre-cast screen is mounted on every floor, allowing good air flow and cutting off direct sun rays. This unique orientation also means that all the offices have views of either the mountain or the harbour, and that none stare straight into the façades of the surrounding buildings.

At 11:55pm in October 1989 a bomb exploded outside the building causing no casualties or injuries.

In 2006 the building was sold along with two other office buildings in Cape Town for R300 million and was at the time the largest Grade A commercial property in the city.

Flanked by John Skotness' Mythological Landscape steel-and-bronze sculpture, the piazza below is a popular public space for office workers and visitors to the city. The building provides a focal point for Thibault Square.

In 2008 the building was acknowledged in a national survey by the South African Institute of Architects to be one of the country's "good buildings".
