= Foreshore, Cape Town =

Suburb of Cape Town, South Africa

Foreshore
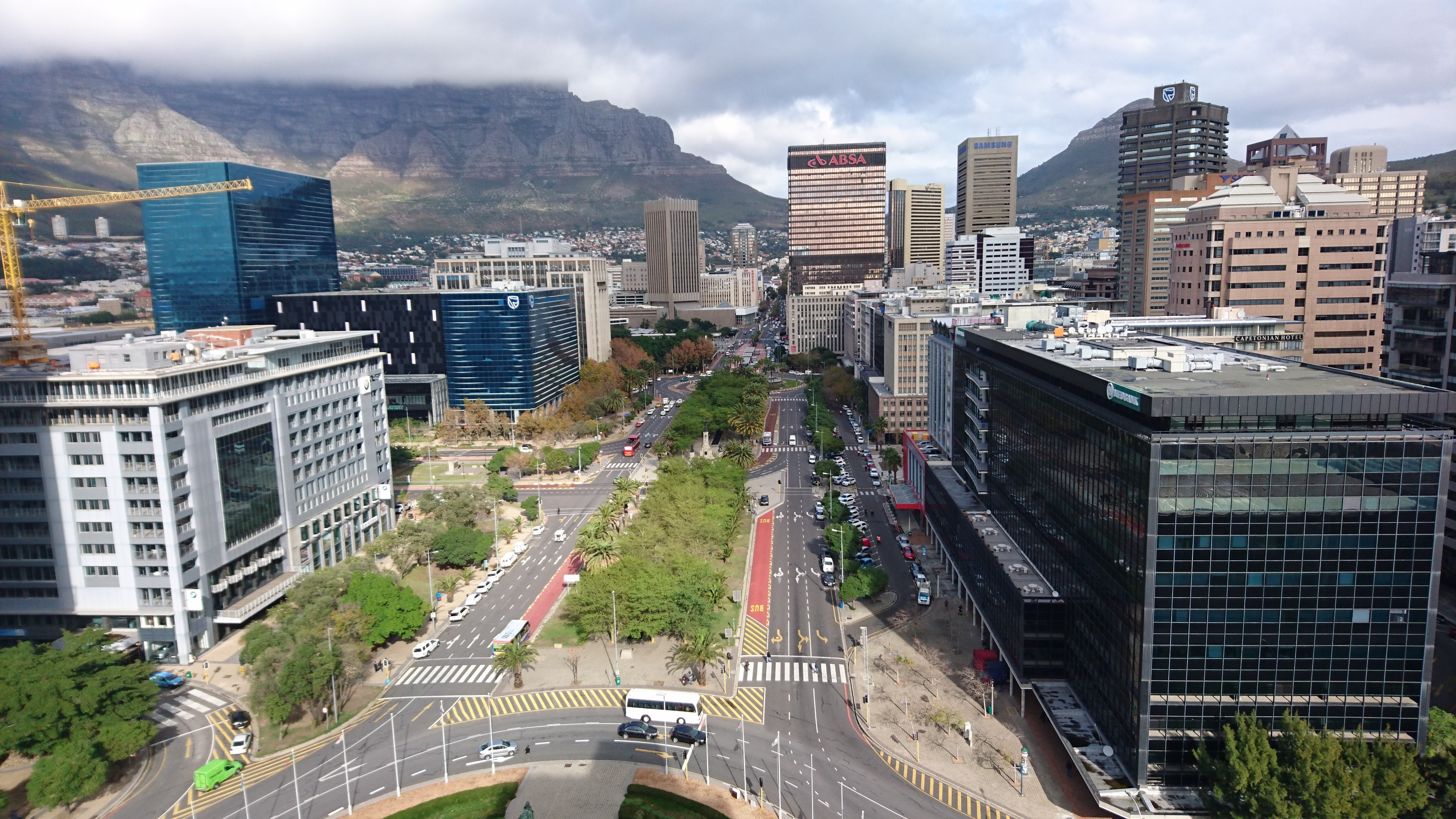
- Aerial view down Heerengracht Street, a major road in the Foreshore

- Map showing the Foreshore and the approximate location of the original coastline
- Interactive map of Foreshore
- Location within Western Cape Location within South Africa Location within Africa
- Coordinates: 33.92°S 18.43°E
- Country: South Africa
- Province: Western Cape
- Municipality: City of Cape Town
- Main Place: Cape Town

Area
  - Total: 2.34 km^{2} (0.90 sq mi)

Population (2011)
  - Total: 268
  - Density: 115/km^{2} (297/sq mi)

Racial makeup (2011)
  - Black African: 43.3%
  - Coloured: 11.2%
  - Indian/Asian: 6.3%
  - White: 34.0%
  - Other: 5.2%

First languages (2011)
  - English: 78.3%
  - Afrikaans: 14.5%
  - Other: 7.2%
- Time zone: UTC+2 (SAST)
- Postal code (street): 8001

The Foreshore is a suburb of Cape Town, South Africa. Situated next to Cape Town CBD, it contains numerous modern office towers, cultural venues, and the Port of Cape Town.

== Geography ==
The Foreshore sits in the City Bowl region of Cape Town, adjacent to Cape Town CBD, the city's main economic hub. The area is situated along Table Bay, into which the port is built. Part of the Foreshore borders the light industrial suburb of Paarden Eiland.

The suburb is located approximately 6 km from Sea Point, 10 km from Century City, and 18 km from Cape Town International Airport.

== History ==
The Foreshore was built on land reclaimed from Table Bay in the 1930s and 1940s, in connection with the construction of the Duncan Dock, which replaced the old harbor.

When the area was reclaimed, the government undertook a detailed study (the Szlumper Commission) to decide how to use the land not needed by South African Railways. This resulted in the issuance of a detailed proposal - The Cape Town Foreshore Plan.

== Features ==
Because of its development later on, many buildings in the Foreshore have more modern architecture than those situated in the older Cape Town CBD area, which sit closer to Table Mountain to the west and De Waterkant to the north.

When combined, a considerable part of the Foreshore area consists of transport infrastructure. This includes land for the Port of Cape Town, the MyCiTi BRT network, Heerengracht Street, a Golden Arrow bus depot, and Cape Town Railway Station.

Notable buildings in the area include:

- Cape Town Civic Centre
- The Artscape Theatre Centre
- The Cape Town International Convention Centre
- The Good Hope Centre
- Standard Bank's regional office, located in The Towers

== Gallery ==
Images of the Foreshore
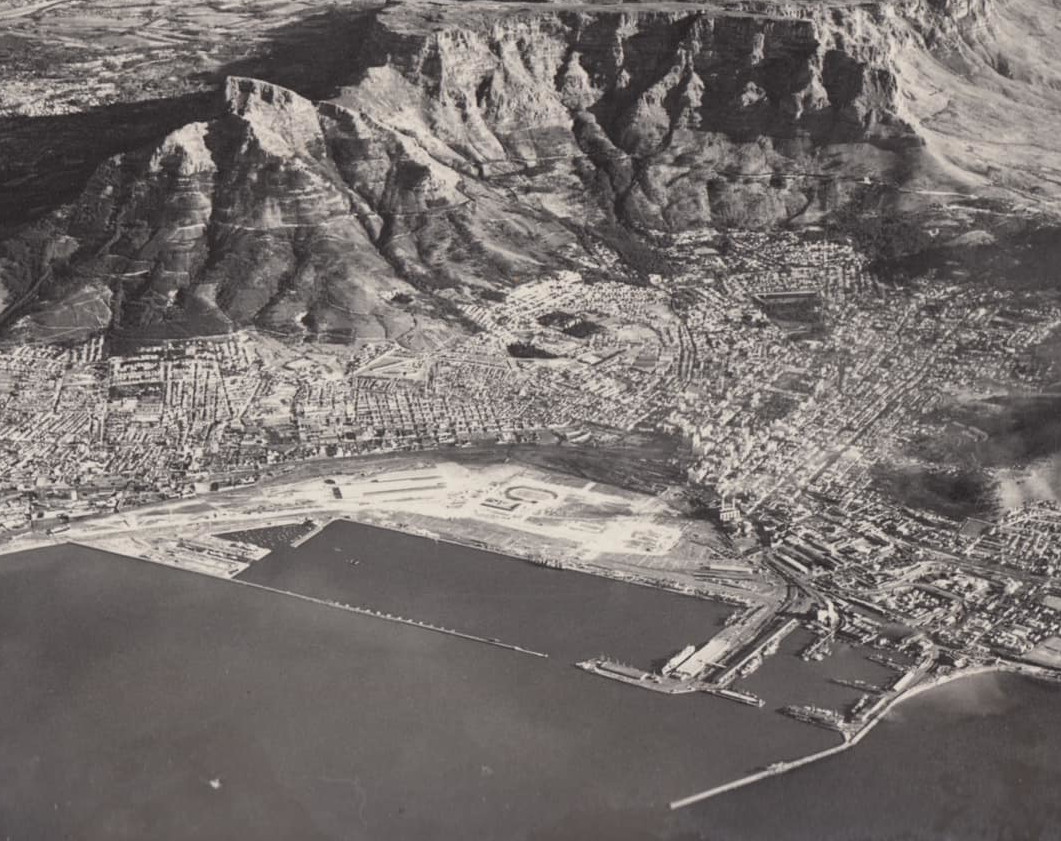
Aerial view of the then-newly-completed Foreshore, in the 1940s

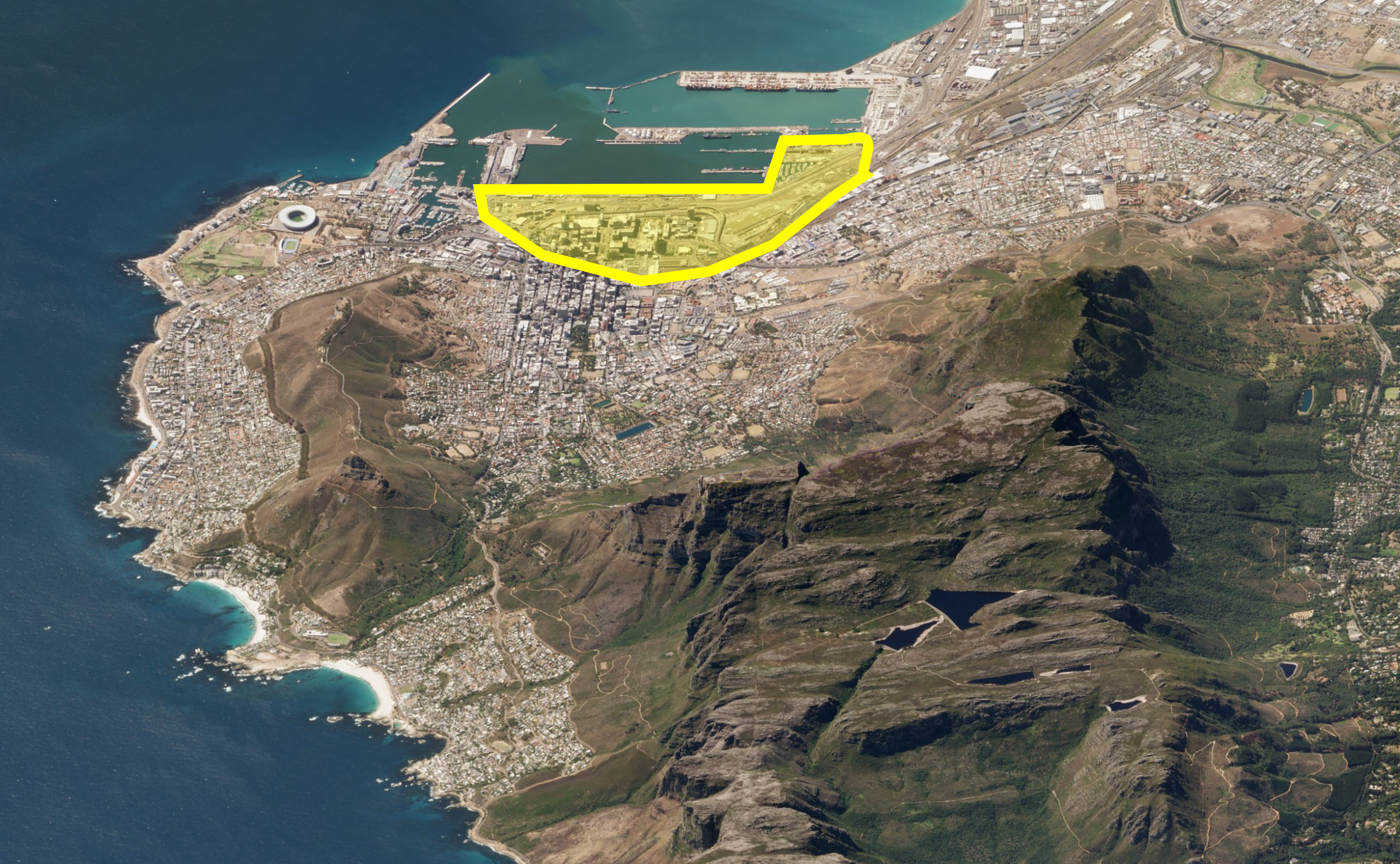
Satellite image of Cape Town's City Bowl, with the Foreshore area highlighted in yellow
