= Portside Tower =

High rise building in Cape Town CBD

- Portside Tower in 2018

General information
- Type: Commercial
- Location: 5 Buitengracht Street, CBD, Cape Town, South Africa
- Coordinates: 33°55′00″S 18°25′19″E
- Current tenants: FNB; RMB; WesBank; Ashburton Investments; Equites; China Construction Bank; EXL Service
- Completed: March 2014; 12 years ago
- Cost: R1.6 Billion (estimated)
- Client: FirstRand; Old Mutual
- Owner: First Rand; Accelerate Property Fund
- Landlord: Baker Street Properties

Height
- Height: 139 metres (456 ft)

Technical details
- Floor count: 32
- Floor area: over 52,000 m^{2}

Design and construction
- Architecture firm: dhk Architects; Louis Karol Architects
- Developer: Eris Property Group; Old Mutual Property
- Civil engineer: WSP Structures; Nadeson
- Quantity surveyor: Aecom Davis Langdon; De Leeuw Group
- Main contractor: Murray & Roberts
- Awards: Tallest green building in South Africa

Portside is a 139-metre-tall (456 ft) building in Cape Town, South Africa. Completed in 2014, it is the city's tallest building and, at the time of completion, was Cape Town's first significant skyscraper developed in Cape Town CBD in 15 years.

It was developed by two of SA's largest financial services firms, FirstRand and Old Mutual, through Eris Property Group and Old Mutual Property.

The property is jointly owned by major South African financial services holding company FirstRand, and Accelerate Property Fund (APF). The bank self-occupies its share of the property, while AcPF leases office and retail space to tenants. AcPF appointed the Cape Town-based commercial brokerage firm Baker Street Properties to manage and market the property.

The Green Building Council of South Africa (GBCSA) awarded the property a 5 star Green Star rating, making it the tallest green building in South Africa.

== Conception ==
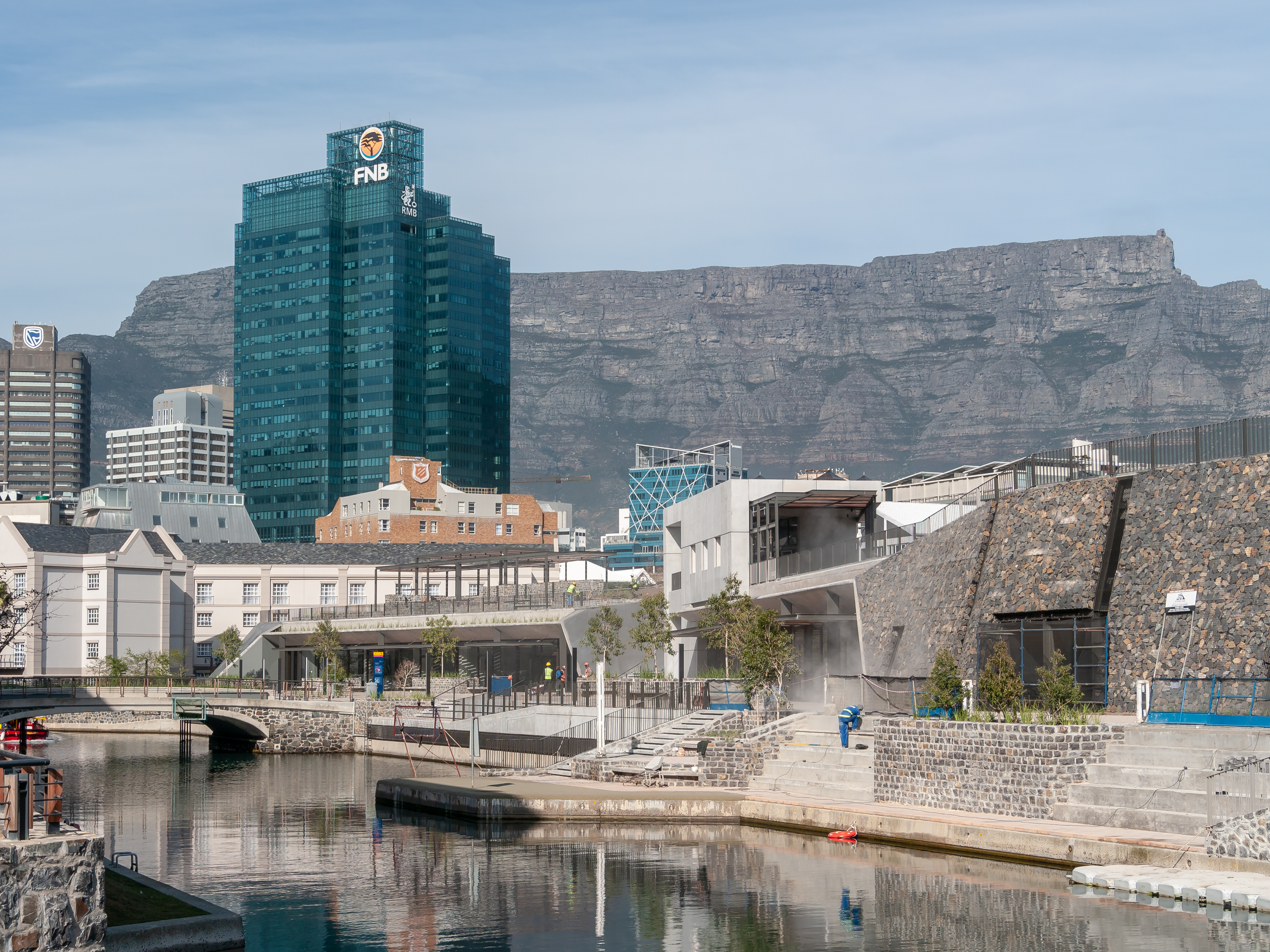
Portside Tower with Table Mountain in background

In 2008, it was initially proposed that the building would include a hotel and be 147.6 metres (484 ft) above sea level. However, due to the late-2000s recession and difficulties in securing a hotel management contact, the project was put on hold for almost three years and the design was altered.

During the design and planning phase, and after extensive public participation, it was decided to keep the building below a certain height so as not to obscure the view of Table Mountain. The 32-storey tower has over 51,500 square metres (554,000 sq ft) of office space with remaining space being used for over 1,382 parking bays and retail outlets.

The building was designed to use low energy technology throughout and is the first large building in South Africa to use almost exclusively LED lighting. The building has been awarded a five star Green Star rating from the Green Building Council of South Africa as compliant technologies have been specified throughout.

The South African architecture studio dhk Architects; Louis Karol Architects designed the building.

== Construction ==
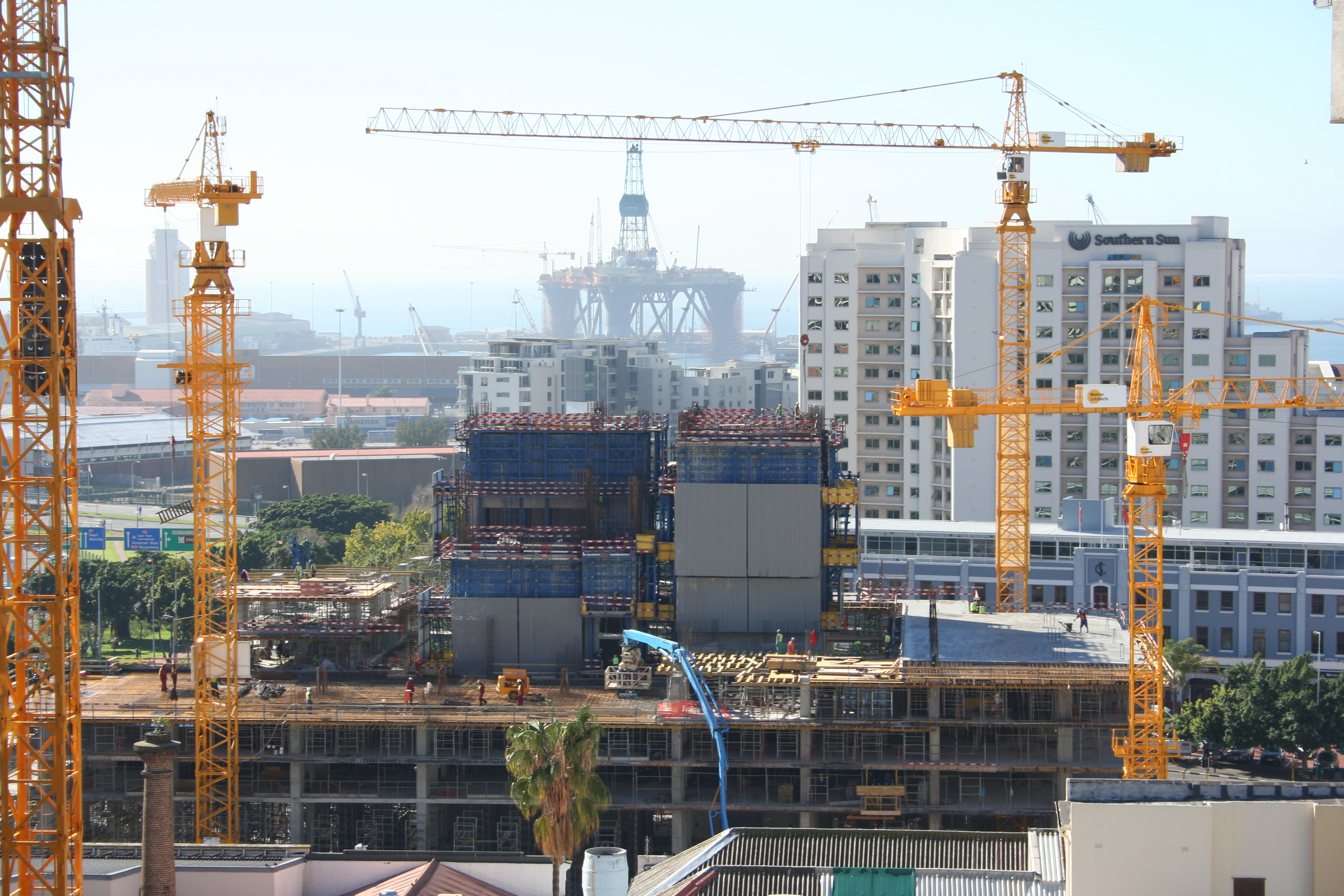
Portside Tower under construction in June 2012, photographed from the south side of the building

Construction work on the tower began on 12 August 2011.

In late March 2013, construction was temporarily halted by the City of Cape Town's disaster response unit due to strong gale-force winds making the scaffolding unstable.

In December 2013, electrical equipment supplier Zest WEG Group stated it was preparing to commission four 1,250 kVA generator sets, two 1,250 kVA transformers, and medium-voltage control panels and interface units, at Portside. The February 2014 commissioning would coincide with the completion of the building's construction. The equipment, from a contract awarded in 2012, would enable the main areas of the building to have diesel-fueled power backup that integrated with the national grid.

The building was completed in March 2014.

== Post-construction ==
In 2016, Accelerate Property Fund (APF) bought Old Mutual's shares in Portside. The deal, worth R755 million, transferred ownership of floors 9 through 18, with a total gross leasable area (GLA) of 25,127 m2.

== Tenants ==
As of 2026, tenants of Portside Tower include:

- China Construction Bank Corporate
- Equites
- FirstRand - FNB, RMB, WesBank, and Ashburton Investments
- EXL Service
- Lindt & Sprüngli South Africa
- MGI Bass Gordon
- Zai Lab

== See also ==
- Cape Town CBD
- List of tallest buildings in Cape Town
- Green building in South Africa
