= Murray & Roberts =

Defunct South African construction company

Murray and Roberts Holdings Ltd.
- Type: Public
- Traded as: JSE: MUR
- Industry: Contract Mining; Engineering; Fabrication
- Founded: 1902; 124 years ago
- Defunct: 2025; 1 year ago
- Fate: Liquidated
- Headquarters: Bedfordview, Ekurhuleni, South Africa
- Area served: Africa; Australasia; Europe; North America
- Key people: Henry Laas (CEO); Daniël Grobler (CFO)
- Services: Project engineering Procurement; Construction; Project commissioning, operations, and maintenance
- Revenue: ▲ R 13.45 billion (2024)
- Operating income: ▲ R 533.4 million (2024)
- Net income: ▲ R −263.2 million (2024)
- Total assets: ▼ R 8.16 billion (2024)
- Total equity: ▼ R 1.56 billion (2024)
- Number of employees: ▼5,443 (2023)
- Website: murrob.com

Murray & Roberts Holdings Ltd, commonly referred to simply as Murray & Roberts, was a major South African engineering and mining corporation. It was listed on the JSE Limited, and operated in the resources, industrial, energy, water, and specialized infrastructure sectors.

The company offered civil, mechanical, electrical, mining, and process engineering, as well as management of concession operations. In addition to the many buildings the company developed over the years, Murray & Roberts was also involved in the construction of major projects including the Gautrain railroad, the Medupi Power Station, and the Cape Town Stadium.

Murray & Roberts suspended trading in November 2024, and was sold off to a new consortium of investors. The company was provisionally liquidated in September 2025.

== History ==
Murray & Roberts was established in 1902 as an emerging house builder in the Cape Colony. For its first 75 years, the company developed under the leadership of its founding families. Douglas Murray inherited Murray & Stewart from his father John in 1928 and co-founded The Roberts Construction Co. in 1934 with his friend and colleague Douglas Roberts. They were later joined by Andrew Roberts, and the three entrepreneurs played a leadership role in the formal development of the South African construction and engineering industry.

Under Douglas Murray, the company followed a strategy that maintained geographic focus in the Cape Province, he sought growth through diversification into construction materials and services as well as the industrial sector. The company later expanded geographic focus into the rest of Africa and elsewhere whist focusing on construction. In 1951 the company became public and listed on the Johannesburg Stock Exchange.

Douglas Murray died in 1964 and was succeeded by long-serving executive Des Baker, who in partnership with Bill Bramwell at Roberts Construction became the architect of a merged and more industrialised Murray & Roberts over a 13-year period between 1967 and 1979. Douglas Roberts finally retired in 1979 and both brothers died in 1982. Following the premature death of Des Baker earlier that year, Bill Bramwell became executive chairman.

Murray & Roberts was formed in 1967 following its merger with Murray & Stewart, but the two companies continued to operate as separate businesses until all operations were fully consolidated in 1979.

Dave Brink joined Murray & Roberts in 1970 as manager of RUC Mining Contracting. He was first appointed an executive director in 1984, followed by his appointment as chief executive in 1985 and chairman in 1994. Brink returned to Murray & Roberts in 1998 as executive chairman and managing director and became a non-executive chairman in 2000 until he retired in 2003. Brink oversaw a period of acquisition and diversification as Murray & Roberts sought growth at a time when South Africa was politically isolated from the world due to Apartheid sanctions and the domestic construction sector was in decline.

The 15-year period between 1980 and 1994 brought significant change to the shareholding and business make-up of Murray & Roberts. In 1984, The Murray Trusts entered a shareholder and voting pool agreement with Sanlam that controlled more than 50% of the issued shares of Murray & Roberts. By 1989, Sanlam had placed its shares into its industrial investment subsidiary Sankorp, which in turn took singular control of the company through the voting pool agreement, influencing board appointments and strategy. Over the period 1990 to 1994, numerous industrial businesses from elsewhere in the Sankorp stable were sold into Murray & Roberts, paid for through the issue of new shares.

By 1995 Sanlam had reduced its shareholding below 35%, a new executive leadership was in place and euphoria around South Africa's new democracy including the promise offered by the Reconstruction and Development Programme. Five contracting activities had reduced to less than 30% of group business with the major contributors being cement, tyres and transport.

In June 2000, management aimed to transform Murray & Roberts fundamentally over a five-year period to 30 June 2005 by expanding the company into emerging markets.

Over the decade from 2000 to 2010, Murray & Roberts experienced significant growth: the project order book increased exponentially to R42 billion and revenues quadrupled to R32 billion. This period in the Group's history was strongly characterised by the lead up to the 2010 FIFA World Cup and the infrastructure investment programme launched by the South African Government to replace ageing infrastructure and prepare South Africa for the largest international event ever hosted on the African continent. It was also a time of global expansion as demand for mining, energy and transport infrastructure increased.

By December 2024, the Group has announced a loss of R1.38 billion. A business rescue plan was agreed by the overwhelming majority of creditors on 8 April 2025. Businesses to be sold included Cementation, Cementation Canada, and Terra Nova Technologies.

A new owner, Differential Capital was also announced in this period.

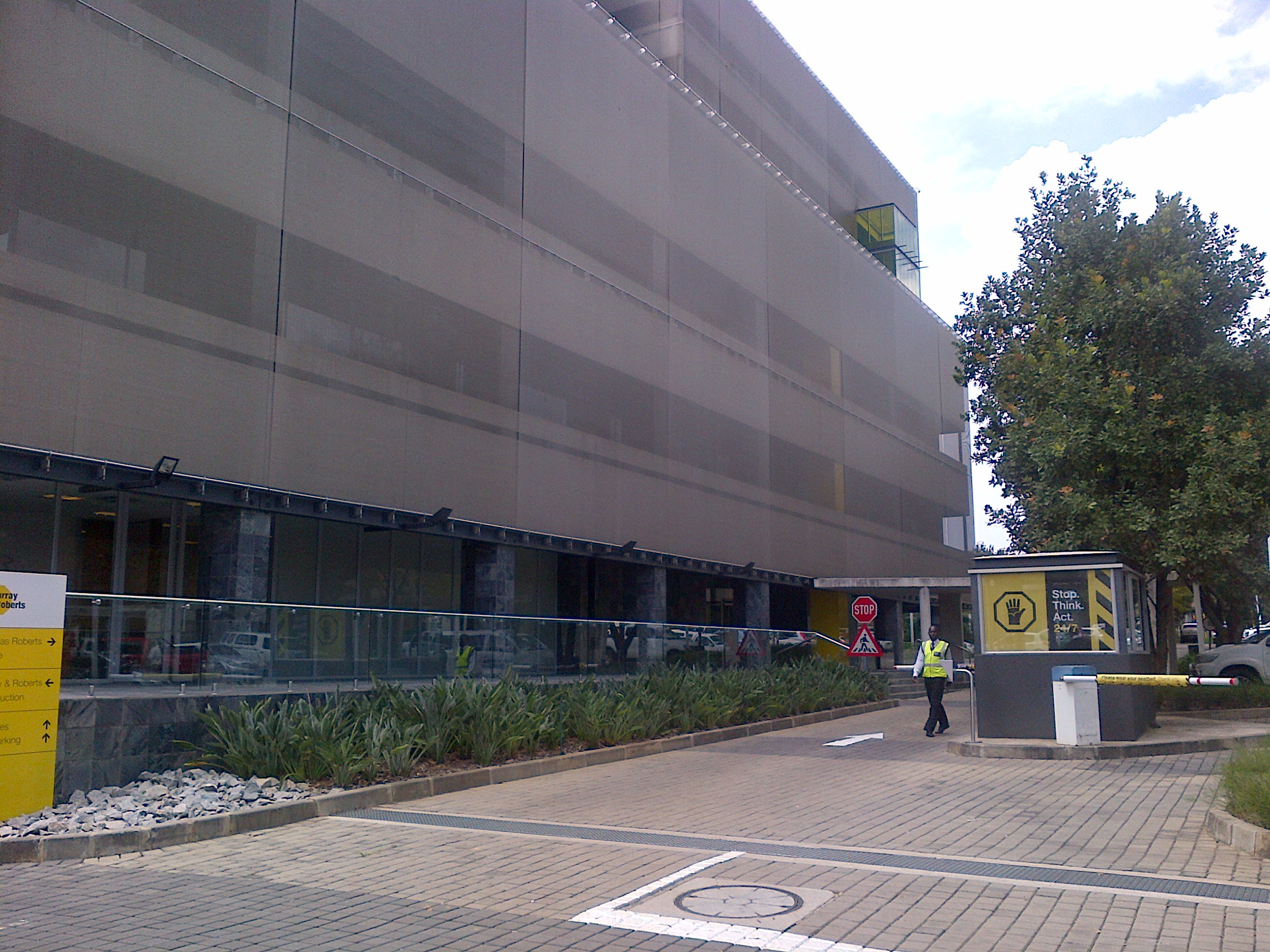
Murray and Roberts Cementation at Douglas Roberts Centre, 22 Skeen Boulevard, Bedfordview, South Africa

Douglas Roberts Centre, Bedfordview, South Africa

== Operating platforms ==
At Murray & Roberts Operation Platforms can be a collection of companies or operating units focused on a particular market segment. Murray & Roberts often participate in large projects together with competitors in the form of joint venture partnerships.

Murray & Roberts today directs its activities into the construction economies of Sub Saharan Africa, Europe, Southeast Asia and the Americas. Market sectors include resources, industrial, energy, water and specialised infrastructure market sectors.

=== Regional platform ===
==== Power, Industrial & Water ====
The Power, Industrial & Water platform operates predominantly in sub-Saharan Africa. Its service offering includes feasibility studies, detailed engineering, procurement, construction, commissioning and repairs and maintenance work.

===== Companies and divisions (South Africa) =====
- Murray & Roberts Power & Energy
- Murray & Roberts Water
- Wade Walker
- Wade Walker Solar
- OptiPower Projects

=== International platforms ===
==== Mining ====
The Mining platform's service offering spans the project life cycle, including feasibility studies, specialist engineering, vertical and decline shaft construction, mine development, specialist mining services, such as raise boring and grouting, and contract mining, as well as open pit mining.

===== Companies and divisions =====
- Cementation Canada – North Bay, Canada
- Cementation USA – Salt Lake City, United States
- GCR Mongolia – Ulaanbaatar, Mongolia
- Merit Consultants International – Vancouver, Canada
- Murray & Roberts Cementation – Johannesburg, South Africa; Kitwe, Zambia; Accra, Ghana
- RUC Cementation Mining & InSig – Perth & Kalgoorlie, Australia
- Terra Nova Technologies – Santee, California,

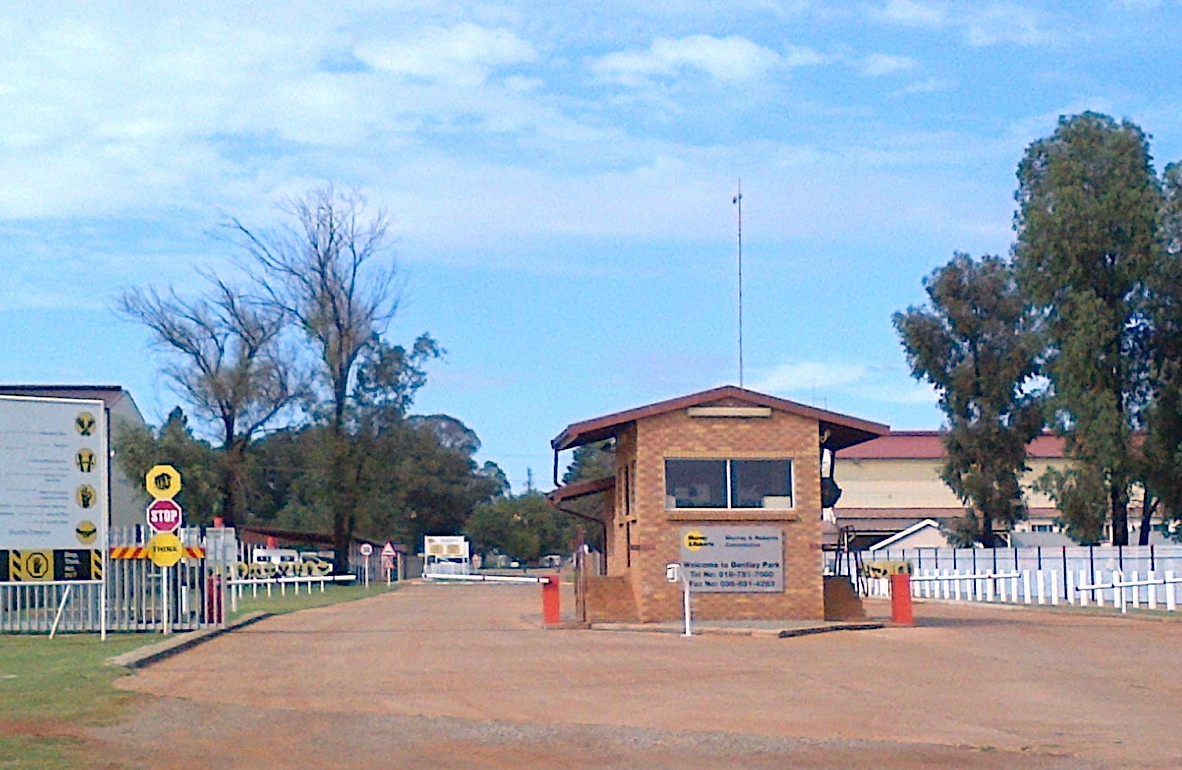
Bentley Park Training Centre, North-west South Africa

==== Energy, Resources & Infrastructure ====
The Energy, Resources & Infrastructure platform's extensive service offering spans the full asset life cycle, including specialist engineering, procurement, construction, commissioning, and operations & maintenance. Services are provided on new build facilities (greenfields) and operating facilities (brownfields). In response to challenging oil and gas market conditions, the platform has broadened its market focus to include resources (metals & minerals) and specialist infrastructure markets (historically serviced), which mitigates the impact of market cyclicality.

===== Companies and divisions =====
- Booth Welsh – Ayrshire, Scotland
- CH-IV – Houston and Baltimore, USA
- Clough – Perth, Brisbane and Sydney, Australia; Houston, USA and Calgary, Canada; Port Moresby, Papua New Guinea
- e2o – Perth, Australia and Houston, USA
- JJ White – Philadelphia, USA

== Gallery of projects involving Murray and Roberts ==
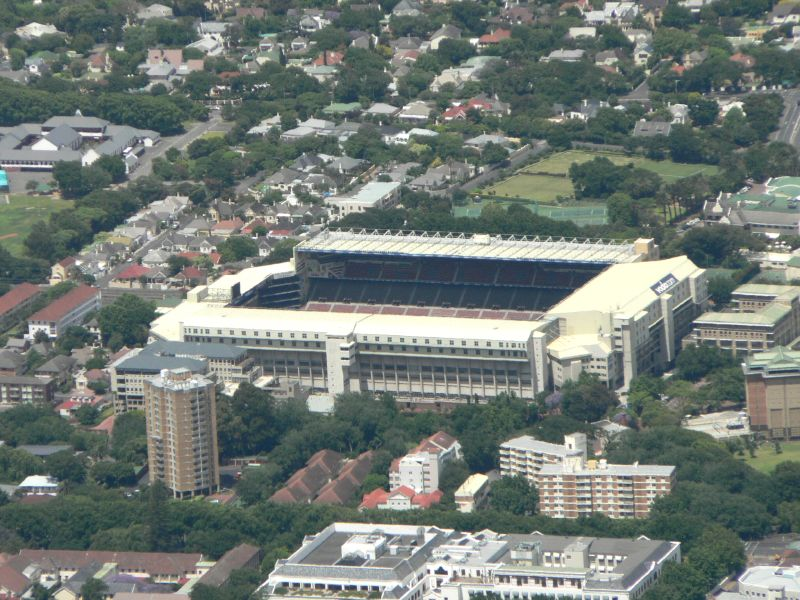
The Newlands Rugby Stadium in Cape Town, South Africa

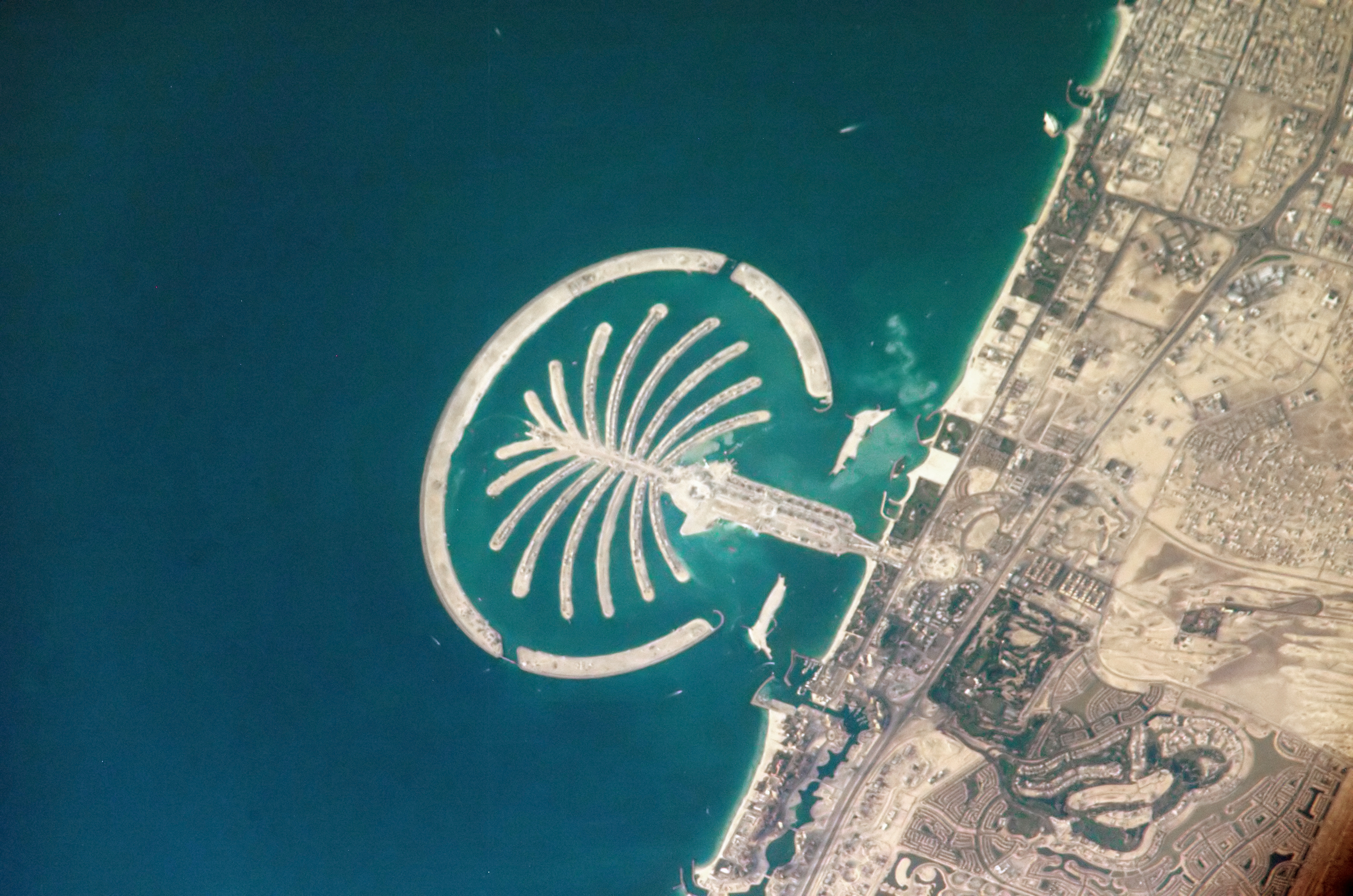
Jumeira Palm Islands projects in Dubai, as seen from the International Space Station.

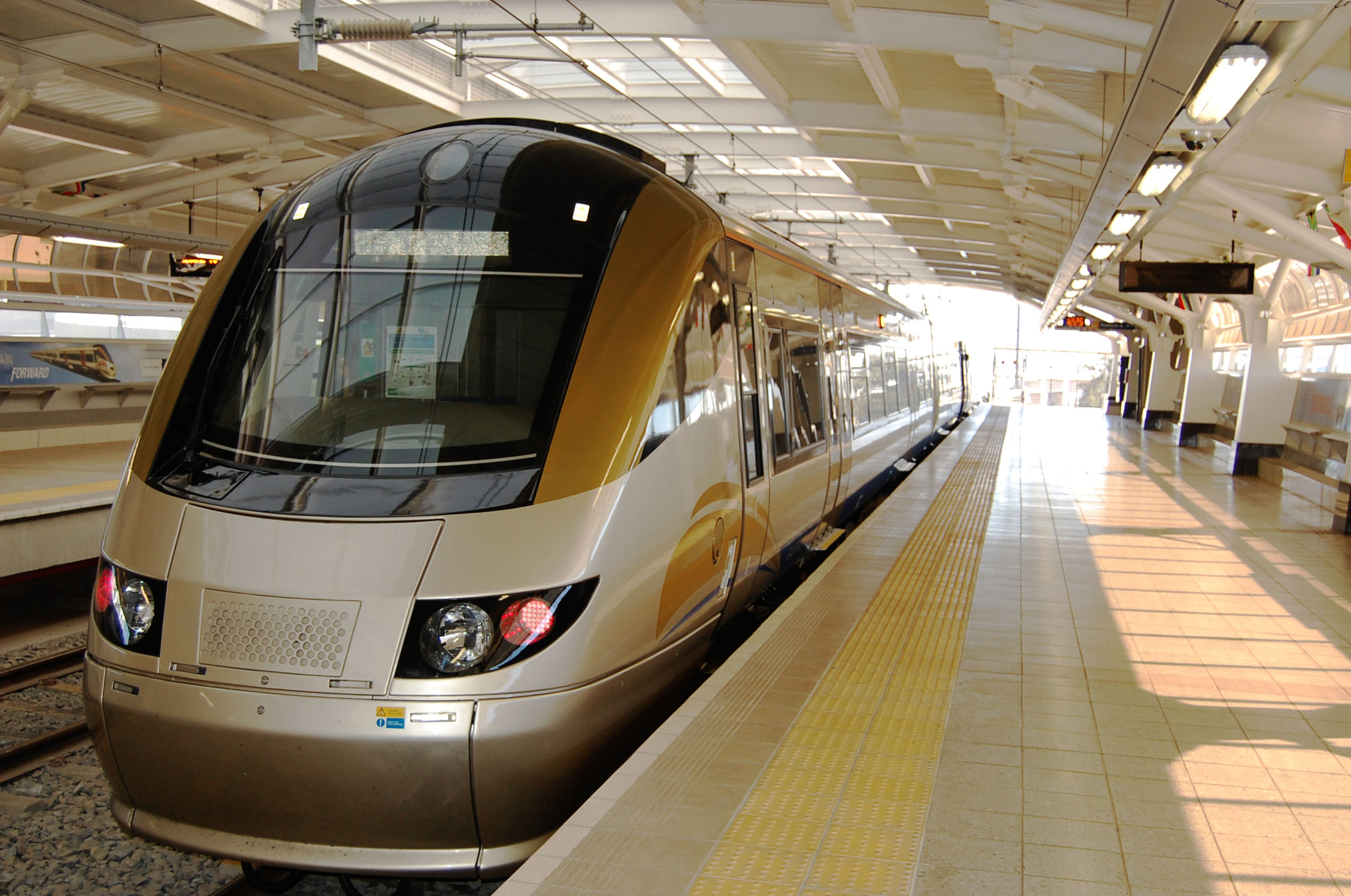
: Gautrain infrastructure. early 2000s

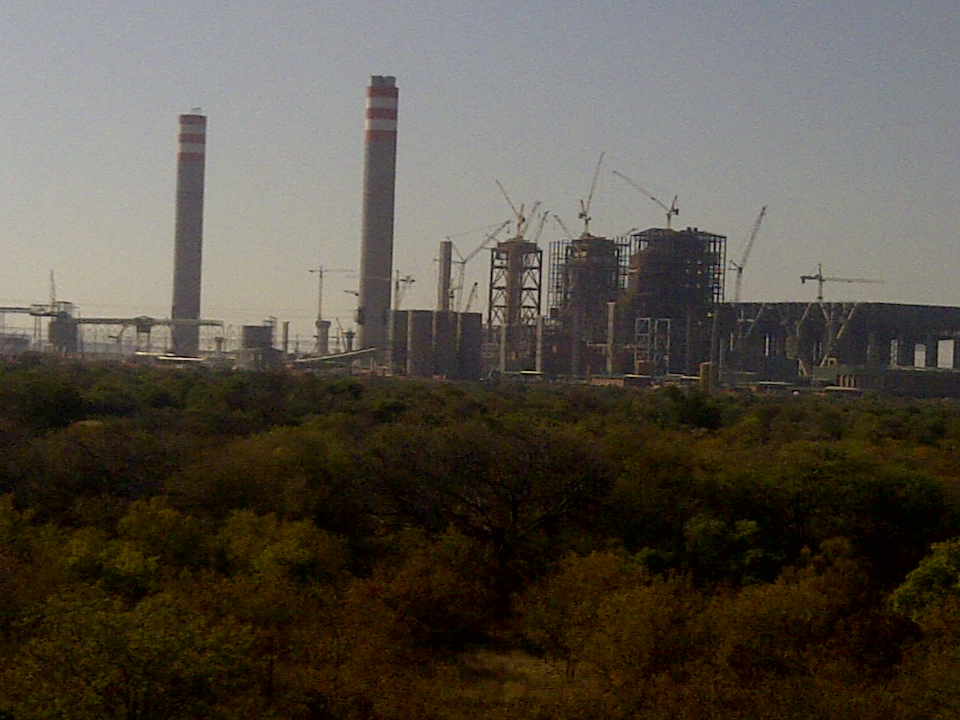
Medupi Power Station, Lephalale, South Africa

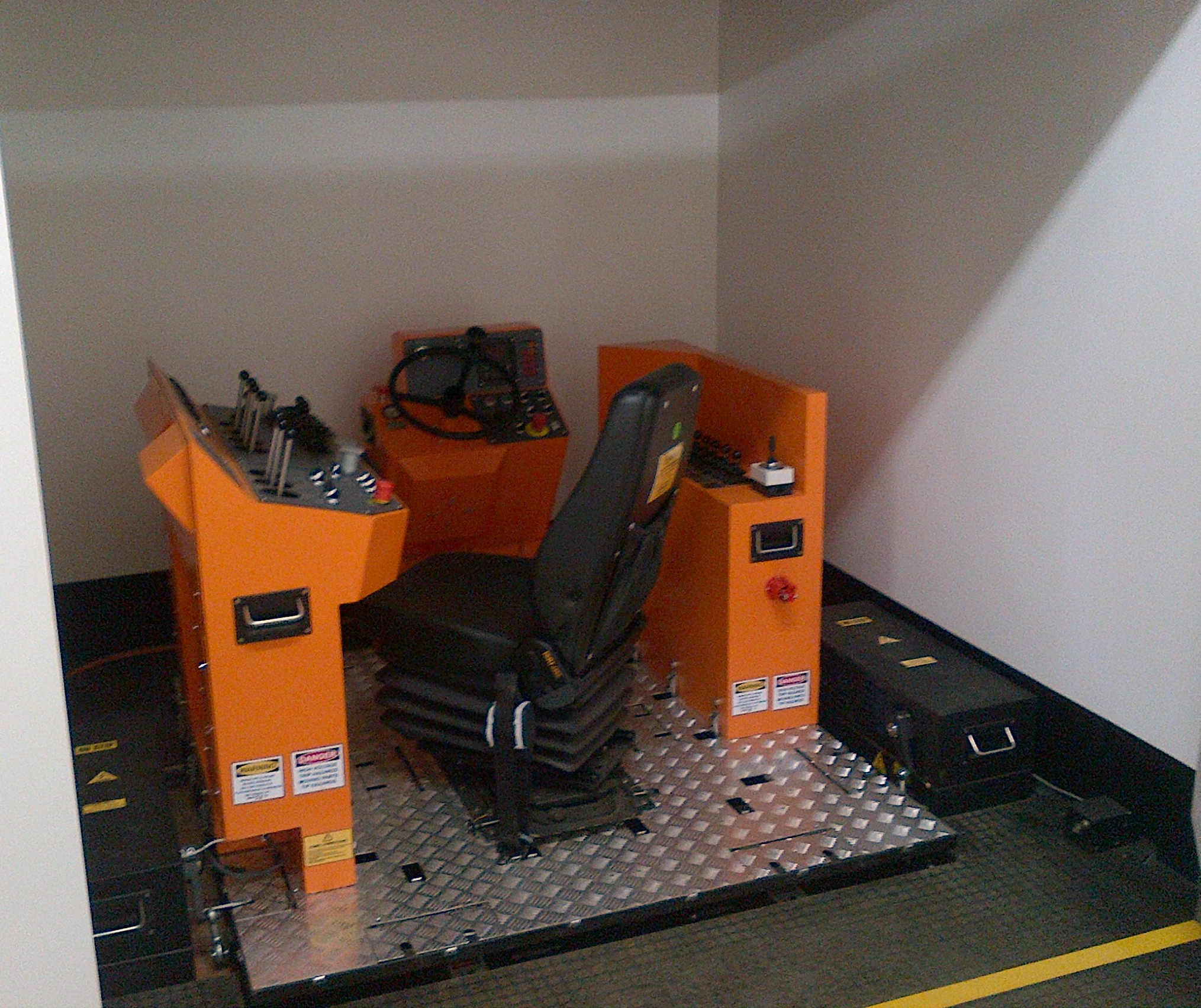
Heavy Equipment Simulator

== Acquisitions and divestments ==
=== Christiani & Nielsen ===
Christiani & Nielsen started operations in South Africa as a subsidiary of the international civil engineering contractors of the same name, whereupon it became a member of the Murray & Roberts group in 1971.

=== Concor ===
Concor was delisted on 30 June 2006 after 100% of its share capital was purchased by Murray & Roberts. It changed its name when it merged with Murray & Roberts Construction (Pty) Ltd. Whilst under the control of Murray & Roberts, Concor Facility Management and Concor Property Development was closed whilst Concor Roads was merged with Concor Civils. Concor Technicrete was sold as a going concern.

After the temporary works collapse which occurred at the site of the Grayston Pedestrian and Cycle Bridge on 14 October 2015 the platform responsible for the collapse, Murray and Roberts Building and Infrastructure, was sold to a black owned consortium, led by Southern Palace Group in late 2016 and renamed Concor Construction in May 2017. Concor is now independent certified a Level 1 BEE Company.

=== Cementation ===
Subsidiary Murray & Roberts RUC, acquired Cementation Africa with effect 1 July 2004. Murray & Roberts sees the mining sector in Africa as one of the areas where it can substantially grow and expand its business over the long term. The complementary nature of the two companies was important, with the merger giving Murray & Roberts Cementation an estimated 60% market share of the hard rock underground mining construction and contracting sectors in Southern Africa.

=== Clough ===
Established in 1919, Clough is an Australian-based engineering, construction and asset support contractor providing full project life cycle solutions primarily to the upstream oil and gas sector. In November 2013, Clough shareholders voted in favour of a proposed scheme under which Murray & Roberts acquired all the ordinary shares in Clough it did not already own.

Murray & Roberts obtained its own shareholder approval to buy the remaining 38.4% of the shares in Clough for about R4bn. Clough's turnkey services range from complex front-end engineering design, construction, installation and commissioning to long-term operations and maintenance.

=== OptiPower Projects ===
On 1 September 2019, the Power, Industrial & Water platform acquired OptiPower Projects, whose capabilities are largely in the construction of MV and HV power lines, construction of MV and HV substations and construction of overhead and underground fibre optic networks, for a consideration of R38 million.

=== Terra Nova Technologies ===
On 1 May 2019, Cementation Americas, which forms part of the Underground Mining platform, acquired 100% of TNT for a total consideration of R635 million. The acquisition of the TNT business was structured through an acquisition of assets of TNT USA Inc. and a 100% share purchase of TNT Chile Limitada.

TNT provides services to the global mining industry (both surface and underground) and design, supply and commission overland conveyors, crushing/conveying systems, mobile stacking systems, including dry stack tailings and heap leach systems, crushing and screening plants and in-pit crushing and conveying systems. TNT also provides process equipment for mining projects. The acquisition of TNT complements the engineering and construction services of Cementation Americas and the Underground Mining platform.

=== JJ White Inc ===
In October 2021, Murray & Roberts acquired J.J. White Incorporated for US$28,25 million. JJ White, founded in 1920, is a private, fourth-generation multi-trade engineering and contracting business, headquartered in Philadelphia, Pennsylvania, United States. JJ White specializes in industrial maintenance and related construction services that covers a full range of mechanical and electrical disciplines.

== San Jose Mine rescue ==
Murray & Roberts participated in the rescue operation of 33 miners who had been trapped underground in the 2010 Copiapó mining accident in the San Jose Mine near the town Copiapó in the north of Chile. Murray & Roberts has a controlling shareholding in two mining contracting companies in Chile; Terracem, which is a specialist raise drilling company, and Cementation Sudamerica, which focused on major vertical shaft and underground mine infrastructure work. Its partner in Chile is a local company, Terraservice.

One of the company's large diameter raise drilling machines, the Strata 950, was used by Terracem in the rescue operation. Rotary Vertical Drilling System (RVDS) technology, co-developed by Murray & Roberts, was applied to accurately drill a pilot hole to reach the trapped miners, where the hole was to be opened up to 660mm to rescue the miners. The Strata 950 had just completed a shaft for Codelco's Andina Mine and had already been transferred to the San Jose Mine where drilling would commence.

== Controversies ==
=== Anti competitive behaviour ===
In June 2013, Murray & Roberts agreed to pay R309 million levied by the Competition Commission as one of 15 construction companies fined a total of R1.46 billion for anticompetitive behaviour. The commission found that the company had committed a total of 17 transgressions of the South African Competition Act. In November 2013 it was reported that Murray & Roberts was pursuing former company executives implicated in anticompetitive behaviour.

The Competition Commission found that Murray & Roberts, along with another 14 South African construction companies, had "an agreement in terms of which firms which were not interested in the projects or winning the tenders, or were not allocated to a project, would submit cover bids to ensure that those interested in particular bids, won them." By this process the colluding companies were able to rig bids so that they could charge higher prices and ensure that participating colluding companies got bids that were preselected by those companies beforehand and without the government or any other third party knowing.

The company was not penalised for a number of the projects the company was caught engaging in anticompetitive behavior in because many of them occurred more than three years before the Competition Commission investigation.
