= Cape Town International Convention Centre =

Convention centre in Cape Town, South Africa

- The main entrance to the CTICC
- Interactive map of the Cape Town International Convention Centre area
- Alternative names: CTICC

General information
- Location: Cape Town, South Africa
- Coordinates: 33.916°S 18.427°E
- Opened: June 2003; 23 years ago
- Owner: Convenco

Design and construction
- Awards: Summit Creative Award (2019)

Website
- www.cticc.co.za

The Cape Town International Convention Centre (CTICC) is a large convention center in Cape Town, South Africa. The centre opened in June 2003. It is run as a partnership between the City of Cape Town and the Western Cape government.

== Location ==
A view of the northern end of CTICC bordering the merger point of the N1 and N2 national highways into Nelson Mandela Boulevard (left) and its intersection with Walter Sisulu Avenue (right)

The centre takes up approximately 6.1 ha (15 acres) in the city's Foreshore region, which forms part of Cape Town CBD. The center is within easy reach of the Victoria & Alfred Waterfront and numerous major hotels. The CTICC is served by the Westin Cape Town Hotel, located on the same premises, in the north-western corner.

== Venues ==
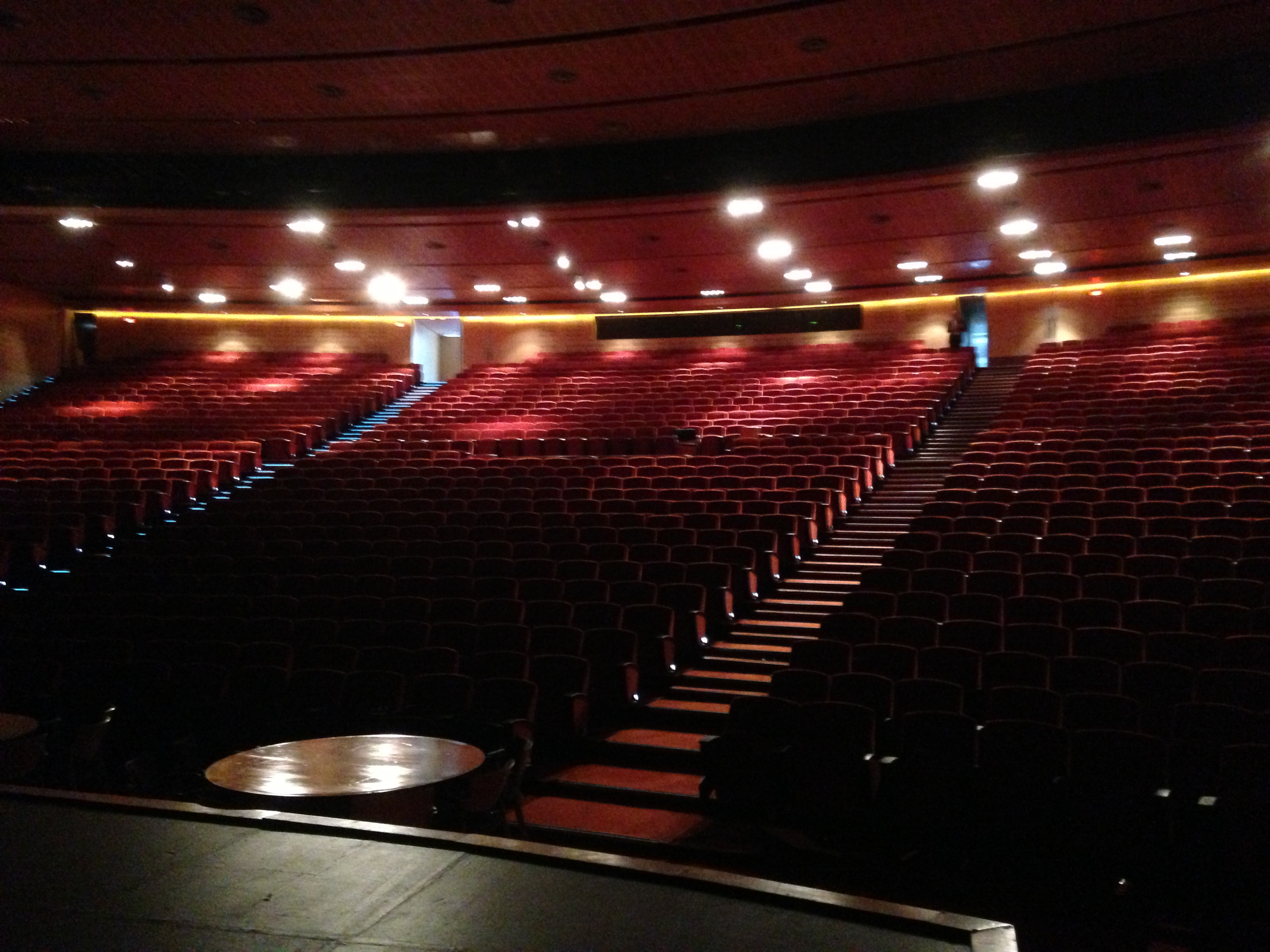
The main auditorium in 2014

The convention centre has exhibition and trade show space of approximately 11,200 m^{2} (121,000 sq ft) that can be divided into multiple conference or banquet venues; a Grand Ballroom, which can be divided by soundproof partitioning. Catering is offered at the premises. The centre has two auditoriums, one seating up to 1500 and the other up to 620.

== History ==
It hosted the Final Draw of the 2010 FIFA World Cup South Africa on 4 December 2009. Guests in attendance included Nobel peace prize winners, former State President FW De Klerk and Desmond Tutu. The event was opened by President of South Africa, Jacob Zuma and President of FIFA, Sepp Blatter.

Due to the success of the CTICC it was expanded in 2010. A second round of expansion work was scheduled to begin in February 2015, with a target completion in 2017. At the time it was announced, the expansion was planned to add 10,000m² of floor space to the centre.

In 2013, the centre hosted 537 events, an increase from 514 in 2012. In 2021, it was estimated that the CTICC has contributed R53.2 billion to the country's GDP and R45.2 billion to the Western Cape's economy in the past twenty years.

The centre hosted the 2023 Netball World Cup.

CTICC hosted the first sitting of seventh parliament that elected the Speaker of the National Assembly as well as the President.

Cape Town, and by extension the CTICC, has become a global conference hub, and a highly desirable place to host delegates for meetings. In recent years, Cape Town has been increasing in popularity as a destination for conferences and meetings. In June 2025, it was reported that Cape Town had reached 35th place globally in the International Congress and Convention Association's (ICCA) rankings of popular destinations for international association meetings.

The report highlighted that Cape Town hosted 58 such meetings in 2024, comprising 60% of the total hosted across South Africa that year. Cape Town also placed among the top 10 cities worldwide for average attendance per event, with an average of 717 delegates per meeting.

In 2025, the City of Cape Town announced that it was investigating selling its shareholding in the CTICC. The 72.7% stake, valued at an estimated R885 million, would be sold to private investors to continue operating the center. The City would retain ownership of the land upon which the center is built, and would use the cash injection to fund public infrastructure projects.

In December 2025, it was reported that the City of Cape Town passed a resolution that granted the City in-principle approval to proceed with exploring the option of selling its stake in the CTICC. The resolution followed the end of a public consultation period that began in September of the same year. The City said that during the consultation process, most of the comments received were in support of the sale.

== Controversies ==
In August 2014, it was reported that the African National Congress had amassed a R1.3 million account with the CTICC since 2011. Executive director of auxiliary affairs, Gerard Ras, said that the ANC should not be allowed to use the facilities until the account is settled.

== See also ==
- List of convention and exhibition centres#South Africa
