= Pets in South Africa =

Pets are popular among South African households. As of 2026, 45% of South African adults have at least one pet, with dogs being the most popular choice by a significant margin at 21%, followed by cats at 6.4%. Survey data relating to pets began being collected by Stats SA in 2023, and in its 2025 General Household Survey (GHS), it was estimated that a total of approximately 7.5 million dogs and 2 million cats were kept by households nationally.

The keeping of pets is regulated at the national, provincial, and local levels of government. Bylaws vary between municipalities.

In mid-2026, the South African pet care industry was estimated to be worth around R10.4 billion, and had an annual growth rate of over 15%. The country has a variety of pet-related retail companies, as well as advanced veterinary services. That same year, South Africa had five major pet store chains, four of which were owned by major supermarket groups. The total number of stores across SA was over 400, with the largest pet care retail companies being Absolute Pets and Petshop Science, together accounting for the majority of stores. In recent years, pet insurance and puppy training classes have increased in popularity, as the commercial pet care industry has continued to grow and formalize.

== History ==
Dogs have been associated with human communities in what is now South Africa for more than a millennium, and were present in the region by the first millennium CE, although the precise timing and routes by which they arrived remain the subject of research.

European settlement, which began in 1652 in the Cape, introduced domestic cats, and new breeds of dogs, to the region.

During the 20th century, pet keeping became increasingly associated with urban household life, while commercial pet food, veterinary services, animal shelters, dog training, organized breeding, and dog sports expanded.

The Kennel Union of Southern Africa was established in 1891 and became the country's principal organization for the registration of purebred dogs, and the organization of dog-related events.The Kennel Union of Southern Africa was established in 1891 as the South African Kennel Club. It adopted the name South African Kennel Union in 1919 and its present name on 1 June 1964.

In the late 20th and early 21st centuries, the South African pet sector developed into a broader commercial industry which continues to grow, and includes specialist pet care retailers, grooming services, pet insurance, dog training, and a growing range of other pets-related products and services.

== Pet ownership ==
An estimated 45% of South African adults had at least one pet in 2026. According to the General Household Survey conducted by Statistics South Africa, in 2025, 21.0% of SA households owned dogs and 6.4% owned cats. An estimated 7.5 million dogs and 2 million cats were kept by households nationally. Dogs were substantially more common than cats – 17.2% of households kept only dogs, 3.8% kept both dogs and cats, and 2.5% kept only cats.

=== Ownership and demographics ===
According to Stats SA's 2025 General Household Survey, pet ownership was associated with household living standards. Among households in the highest Living Standards Measure categories (LSM 8–10), 41.8% owned dogs and 12.7% owned cats. By income quintile, 33.9% of households in the wealthiest quintile owned dogs, compared with 12.9% in the poorest quintile; cat ownership increased from 3.6% to 10.4% across the same groups.

Household characteristics were also associated with pet ownership. Dog ownership increased from 11.0% among households headed by people aged 15–34 to 31.2% among those headed by people aged 75 and older, while cat ownership increased from 2.9% to 10.2% across the same age groups. Households with children were also more likely to own pets: dog ownership increased from 18.1% among households without children to 25.5% among households with three or more children, while cat ownership increased from 5.6% to 8.3%.

=== Dogs ===
Dogs are the most commonly owned pet in South Africa. The 2025 General Household Survey estimated that South African households kept approximately 7.5 million dogs, with 21.0% of households owning at least one dog. Most dog-owning households kept a single dog: 56.0% of dogs were the only dog in their household, while 27.1% of households with dogs kept two. Only 3.4% of dog-owning households kept five or more dogs.

Breed ownership is difficult to quantify nationally because a large proportion of dogs are mixed-breed or are not registered with a pedigree organization. A 2024 survey by TGM Research, based on 519 South African respondents who owned dogs, identified the German Shepherd as the most commonly reported breed. Data from South African veterinary and pet insurance populations also indicate the prominence of several other breeds.

Among registered pedigree dogs, the Kennel Union of Southern Africa (KUSA) provides a different measure of breed popularity. In 2025, frequently registered breeds included Labrador Retrievers, Golden Retrievers, Rhodesian Ridgebacks, and Rottweilers. However, these figures represent registrations of pedigree dogs rather than the overall dog population, and therefore do not necessarily reflect the breeds most commonly kept by South African households.

Dog ownership is more prevalent in rural households than in urban households. In 2025, 23.9% of rural households owned dogs, compared with 19.8% of urban households. Dog ownership was highest in the Northern Cape (34.7%), followed by the Western Cape (34.1%) and Eastern Cape (31.8%). It was lowest in Limpopo (14.3%), Gauteng (15.9%), and Mpumalanga (16.1%).

=== Cats ===
Cats are the second most commonly owned pet in SA. The 2025 Stats SA General Household Survey estimated that approximately 2 million cats were kept by South African households, with 6.4% of households owning at least one cat. Around two-thirds of cat-owning households kept a single cat, while approximately one in five kept two cats.

Mixed-breed cats are particularly common. A 2023 TGM Research survey found that the Domestic short-haired cat was the most commonly reported cat type among South African respondents, accounting for 20.6% of responses.

A subsequent TGM Research survey in 2024 found the British Shorthair to be the most commonly reported cat breed among its South African respondents, followed by the Siamese. The survey also identified Domestic short-haired cats and Maine Coons among the more commonly reported types. The survey was conducted online and included 215 South African respondents who reported owning cats, and therefore provides an indication of reported breed popularity rather than a census of the country's cat population.

Cat ownership is less common than dog ownership in both urban and rural South Africa. In 2025, 8.1% of rural households owned cats, compared with 5.6% of urban households. Among households owning either cats or dogs, Gauteng and the Northern Cape had the highest average number of cats per household, at 1.8.

=== Other ===
Some South Africans also keep a variety of non-domesticated animals as pets. Certain animals are subject to stricter regulations at various levels of government, while others are prohibited.

== Animal welfare ==
=== Animal shelters ===
Animal shelters and pounds provide temporary care for stray, abandoned, surrendered, and impounded animals, with various animal welfare organizations playing a major role in rescue, rehabilitation, and rehoming. Municipalities may also operate or contract animal pounds, and regulate the impoundment and treatment of animals through local bylaws.

=== Stray and free-roaming animals ===
Stray and free-roaming animals are regulated primarily through municipal animal keeping bylaws. Municipal authorities may impound animals found roaming unlawfully, with rules governing the treatment, identification, and release or rehoming of impounded animals varying between municipalities.

=== Sterilization and population management ===
Sterilization is widely used by animal welfare organizations and municipalities to control populations of unwanted dogs and cats. Some municipal bylaws also provide for compulsory sterilization in specified circumstances, particularly for stray animals, or allow officials to require sterilization where necessary for animal welfare or to prevent nuisances.

=== Animal protection ===
The principal national law protecting animals from cruelty is the Animals Protection Act 71 of 1962. Municipal bylaws provide additional requirements for animal keeping, while conservation legislation may impose further restrictions on wild and protected species.

== Regulation ==
As of 2026, the ownership status and regulations for pets in SA is as follows:

Animal type	Ownership status	Regulations	Permits	Animal welfare requirements	Notes	Ref
Dogs	● Generally permitted	Owners must comply with national animal health and animal welfare legislation, including compulsory rabies vaccination. Municipal bylaws regulate the number of dogs that may be kept, nuisance, confinement, licensing or registration, and dangerous dogs.	Varies by municipality. Cape Town requires registration of all dogs and cats and permits up to two dogs in a flat or apartment duplex, three in a dwelling house on an erf smaller than 600 m², four in a dwelling house on an erf larger than 600 m², and six on an agricultural property; a permit is required to keep more than the prescribed number. Tshwane regulates the keeping of dogs through its animal-keeping bylaw. eThekwini permits up to two dogs on properties of 650 m² or less and three on larger properties, with written municipal permission available for additional dogs.	Owners must care for the animal, including providing adequate food, water, shelter, and veterinary attention where required.	Municipal limits and permitting requirements differ substantially.	
Cats	● Generally permitted	Owners are subject to national animal health and animal welfare requirements and municipal bylaws regulating numbers, nuisance, confinement, and welfare.	Varies by municipality. Cape Town requires registration of all cats and permits up to four cats in a dwelling unit, dwelling house, or large dwelling house, and six on an agricultural property; a permit is required to keep more than the prescribed number. Cape Town also requires cats older than six months to be permitted and requires them to be microchipped and fitted with identification. Tshwane regulates cats through its animal-keeping bylaw.	Owners must care for the animal, including providing adequate food, water, shelter, and veterinary attention where required.	Municipal numerical limits and permit requirements vary.	
Birds	● Generally permitted	Domestic birds may generally be kept as pets, but municipal bylaws may regulate the number of birds, aviaries, poultry, nuisance, hygiene, and species that may be kept. Indigenous, threatened, protected, or otherwise regulated wild birds may be subject to conservation legislation.	Varies by municipality and species. Cape Town requires a permit for keeping more than five birds on premises and separately regulates poultry and rock doves or feral pigeons. Indigenous or protected species may additionally require provincial or national conservation permits.	Owners must care for the animal, including providing appropriate food, water, shelter, space, and veterinary care where required.	Requirements are substantially more restrictive for indigenous or protected wild birds than for common domesticated pet birds.	
Fish	● Generally permitted	Aquarium fish may generally be kept privately, but species regulated as threatened, protected, alien, or invasive are subject to biodiversity legislation. Release of aquarium animals or aquarium water containing regulated alien or invasive species may be prohibited.	Generally no general pet licence for ordinary aquarium fish, but permits may be required for possession, movement, or other restricted activities involving listed threatened or protected species. Restrictions may also apply to listed alien and invasive species.	Owners must care for the animal, including providing suitable water quality, housing, nutrition, and environmental conditions.	Requirements depend heavily on the species. Ordinary ornamental fish are generally less regulated than indigenous, threatened, or invasive species.	
Rabbits	● Generally permitted	Domestic rabbits may generally be kept as pets, subject to municipal animal-keeping, nuisance, hygiene, and welfare requirements.	Varies by municipality. Cape Town requires a permit to keep or breed rabbits. Tshwane has specific requirements governing the premises and keeping of rabbits. eThekwini regulates rabbit hutches, runs, sanitation, water supply, and the keeping of rabbits on business premises.	Owners must care for the animal, including providing adequate food, water, shelter, space, sanitation, and veterinary care where required.	Municipal requirements can be considerably more detailed than those applying to ordinary dogs and cats.	
Reptiles and amphibians	● Species-dependent	Keeping reptiles and amphibians is subject to national and provincial conservation legislation where species are indigenous, threatened, protected, alien, invasive, or otherwise regulated. Ordinary captive-bred exotic species may also be subject to provincial or municipal restrictions.	Permit requirements vary by species and province. Possession or other restricted activities involving threatened or protected species may require a TOPS permit. CITES-listed species may require additional permits for international trade or importation.	Owners must care for the animal, including providing appropriate temperature, humidity, enclosure, nutrition, water, and veterinary care where required.	There is no single national pet licence covering all reptiles and amphibians; legal requirements depend heavily on species and jurisdiction.	
Exotic animals and farm animals	● Species-dependent, and land zoning- and size-dependent	Wild and exotic mammals, livestock, and poultry are subject to national animal health and animal welfare legislation, as well as provincial conservation legislation where applicable. Indigenous, threatened, protected, alien, or invasive species may be subject to additional restrictions.	Requirements vary substantially by species and municipality. Permits may be required for possession or other restricted activities involving listed threatened or protected species. Cape Town requires a permit for livestock, with applications considered only for properties larger than 4,000 m², and requires building plans for livestock stables. Its bylaw also requires permits for keeping cattle, horses, mules, donkeys, goats, sheep, pigs, or poultry where the applicable limits are exceeded. Tshwane prohibits keeping livestock other than poultry on premises smaller than 1 hectare and requires suitable premises and municipal compliance. Municipal approval may also be required for poultry and other animals in particular circumstances.	Owners must care for the animal, including providing appropriate housing, nutrition, water, environmental conditions, and veterinary care where required. Livestock and poultry are additionally subject to animal health regulations relating to disease prevention and control.	Livestock and poultry are regulated differently from ordinary pets, and municipal requirements vary substantially. Cape Town and Tshwane impose particularly specific requirements on the size and suitability of premises.	

=== National legislation ===
At the national level, pet ownership is regulated primarily through a few pieces of legislation. The Animals Protection Act 71 of 1962 establishes general protections for animals, while the Animal Health Act 7 of 2002, and regulations made under it, provide for animal health controls.

The National Environmental Management: Biodiversity Act 10 of 2004 regulates the keeping and possession of certain wild, alien, and invasive species, with additional controls applying to listed species under the Threatened or Protected Species Regulations, and regulations concerning alien and invasive species. South Africa's obligations under the Convention on International Trade in Endangered Species of Wild Fauna and Flora (CITES) also impose controls on the international trade and local sale of listed species.

These national requirements operate alongside provincial conservation legislation and local bylaws governing the keeping of animals within particular municipalities.

=== Municipal regulation ===
Municipalities put their own bylaws in place relating to pet ownership. These may regulate the number and types of animals that may be kept, nuisance and animal control provisions, as well as registration or licensing requirements.

For example, the City of Cape Town's Animal Keeping Bylaw, 2021 regulates the number of dogs and cats that may be kept according to dwelling and property size, and requires residents to register their pets. Permits are required to keep animals above the prescribed limits.

The City of Johannesburg has separate dog and cats bylaws governing the keeping and control of those animals, while the City of Tshwane has a bylaw specifically governing the keeping of animals, birds, and poultry. Requirements relating to pet ownership can differ substantially between metros.

=== Importation and quarantine ===
The importation of animals into South Africa is regulated primarily through veterinary import controls administered by the Department of Agriculture. A veterinary import permit is required before an animal is shipped to South Africa, and the applicable requirements depend on the species of animal and the country of origin.

Importers must present the original veterinary import permit and veterinary health certificate at the port of entry, together with any additional documentation required for the particular animal, such as proof of vaccinations or a permit under the Convention on International Trade in Endangered Species of Wild Fauna and Flora (CITES).

Animals subject to quarantine must be accommodated at an approved quarantine station arranged through the state veterinarian at the relevant port of entry. South Africa has quarantine facilities serving, among others, the cities of Cape Town and Johannesburg.

The quarantine requirements vary according to the species, health status, country of origin, and conditions specified in the veterinary import permit. Cats and dogs, for example, have separate procedures for imports that are and are not subject to quarantine. The Department of Agriculture states that import health requirements can change, and advises importers to obtain the current requirements for the particular animal before arranging its transport.

The veterinary import permit system also applies to animals moved through South Africa in transit, and an applicable tariff is charged.

== Pet industry ==
The South African pet care industry was estimated to be valued at around R10.4 billion in mid-206, and had an annual growth rate of over 15%.

=== Pet food ===
As of 2026, pet food accounts for 74% of the total economic value of the local pet care industry, and around 62% of pet food is bought at supermarkets. South Africa has a wide array of pet food brands on sale, within various price ranges, however some of these have had recalls over the years, due to various issues. As of 2026, brands that have no record of any major health issues in the South African market include:

Brand	Price range *	Made for	Origin	Verified SA availability	Ref
Posh Pets	Budget	Dogs and cats	South African; Manufactured in SA exclusively for Woolworths	—	
Montego Classic	Mid-range	Dogs and cats	South African; Manufactured in SA	2000; 26 years ago	
Jock	Mid-range	Dogs	South African; Manufactured in SA	—	
Whiskas	Mid-range	Cats	Foreign; Manufactured in SA	1994; 32 years ago	
Brit Premium	Mid-range	Dogs and cats	Foreign; Imported from the Czech Republic	—	
Eukanuba	Premium	Dogs	Foreign; Imported from France	1994; 32 years ago	
Royal Canin	Premium	Dogs and cats	Foreign; Manufactured in SA	1994; 32 years ago	
Farmina	Premium	Dogs and cats	Foreign; Imported	—	

* In the context of the South African market

=== Pet-related retail ===
In recent years, there has been a shift towards more large-scale pet store chains in South Africa. Aside from independent pet stores and smaller chains, there are four major pet store chains in South Africa, all of which are relatively new in the context of South African retail chains, with two being significantly larger than the others. Each is owned by a different major supermarket group.

Pet stores chains of South Africa
Company	Parent company	Founded	Headquarters	Number of locations *	Ref
Absolute Pets	Woolworths	2005; 21 years ago	Cape Town	200+ (2026)	
Petshop Science	Checkers	2021; 5 years ago	Brackenfell	173 (2026)	
Pet Storey	SPAR	2025; 1 year ago	Pinetown	22 (2026)	
VetsMart	Food Lover's Market	2004; 22 years ago	Cape Town	12 (2026)	
Petworld	Petworld Africa Holding	2014; 12 years ago	Cape Town	9 (2026)	
Total	–	–	–	416+	

* Including countries of operation outside of South Africa

=== Pet insurance ===
Pet insurance is available in South Africa and is offered by multiple insurance companies and other types of financial service providers.

While pet insurance has existed in South Africa since 1992 when it was launched by PetSure, it remained quite niche until recent years. The second company offering it, MediPetSA, only entered the SA market in 2007. The third competitor, Oneplan, launched in 2009. Demand for pet insurance began to increase significantly during the 2010s and into the 2020s. As of 2026, major companies offering pet insurance include:

Company	Established	HQ	Ref
1st for Women	2022; 4 years ago	Johannesburg	
Auto & General	–	Johannesburg	
Checkers	2020; 6 years ago	Cape Town	
Dotsure	–	George	
Hollard	1992; 34 years ago	Johannesburg	
Kido Pet Insurance	–	Johannesburg	
MediPet	2007; 19 years ago	Cape Town	
MiWay	2025; 1 year ago	Centurion	
Oneplan	2011; 15 years ago	Johannesburg	
OUTsurance	2020; 6 years ago	Centurion	
PawPaw	2012; 14 years ago	Cape Town	
Woolworths	2023; 3 years ago	Cape Town	

== Training ==
Pet training in South Africa is particularly developed for dogs, with puppy classes, obedience training, behavior modification, and competitive dog sports available through private trainers and training clubs. These include Pawfect Pups in Cape Town, Treat to Train in Pretoria and Johannesburg, and GoodPet in Durban.

Puppy and socialization classes are commonly used to introduce young dogs to basic commands, handling, other dogs, people, and different environments. Starting training from the puppy stage is recommended by many associations, as it results in a significantly better-behaved dog.

The Kennel Union of Southern Africa (KUSA) regulates training classes and events, and licenses obedience tests and sporting events. Its recognized dog sports include obedience, agility, dog jumping, rally dog, tracking trials, working trials, flyball, and carting.

Training methods vary between providers, but overall, positive reinforcement, reward-based, and choice-based methods are recommended.

== Data ==
Nationally representative pet ownership data were only incorporated into the Stats SA General Household Survey (GHS) in 2023, providing the first comprehensive estimates of dog and cat populations in the context of pets, at national, provincial, and metropolitan levels. The survey is conducted every year, with data generally published the year after it was collected.

== See also ==
- South African culture
- Retailing in South Africa
