= Pet Storey =

South African retail company

- Type: Subsidiary
- Industry: Retail
- Founded: 2025; 1 year ago
- Headquarters: uMhlanga, KwaZulu-Natal, South Africa
- Number of locations: 22 (2026)
- Area served: South Africa
- Parent: SPAR South Africa
- Website: pet-storey.co.za

Pet Storey is a South African pet store retail chain, owned by major local supermarket company SPAR. Founded in 2025, Pet Storey is headquartered in uMhlanga, KwaZulu-Natal.

The company was the third entrant into the pet store retail chain sector in SA, after its larger competitors Absolute Pets and Petshop Science, which are both also owned by local supermarket companies.

== History ==
Pet Storey was established in September 2025, as a subsidiary of major South African retail company SPAR. The first store, which was opened in Johannesburg, was originally part of local company Petmasters, and was rebranded to Pet Storey.

At the launch, Spar confirmed it had plans to expand the brand to between 25 and 30 stores by the end of 2025, and a minimum of 100 stores by the end of 2026.

When the first Pet Storey outlet opened, competing major South African retail chain Woolworths' subsidiary, Absolute Pets had a total of 180 stores, and retail chain Checkers' subsidiary Petshop Science had 144 locations. Retail chain Food Lover's Market had also begun rolling out independent VetsMart stores.

In December 2025, it was reported that Pet Storey had reached 12 stores, after converting more Petmaster outlets. Pet Storey had also launched its first franchised location.

== Operations ==
As of May 2026, Pet Storey operates a total of 22 stores across South Africa.

== Controversy ==
In September 2025, a video posted by a visitor to the first Pet Storey outlet (located in Johannesburg) claimed that the retail chain sold puppies from its stores - something not commonly done in South Africa, and not by any competing pet store chains. After public backlash due to concerns about animal health and safety in retail outlets, local media outlet Business Report contacted Pet Storey's parent company, Spar.

The latter stated that via a partnership with company Petmasters (which was rebranded to Pet Storey), it sold various animals from that particular outlet. It said that this was the case before the store was bought and rebranded. Spar said it did not have plans to replicate those sales at other stores as Pet Storey expanded. Furthermore, Spar said it was committed to animal welfare, and would seek to rehome any remaining puppies at that store while they were awaiting sale, by contacting animal welfare organizations. After this, the company stated it would no longer take part in puppy sales.

Facing continued inquiries, a day later, Spar stated that it would no longer participate in the sale of any kind of animal.

== See also ==
- Spar (South Africa)
- Retailing in South Africa
