= 2022 South African census =

Comprehensive census performed by Statistics South Africa, the latest in a series

4th National Census
- 1 February 2022
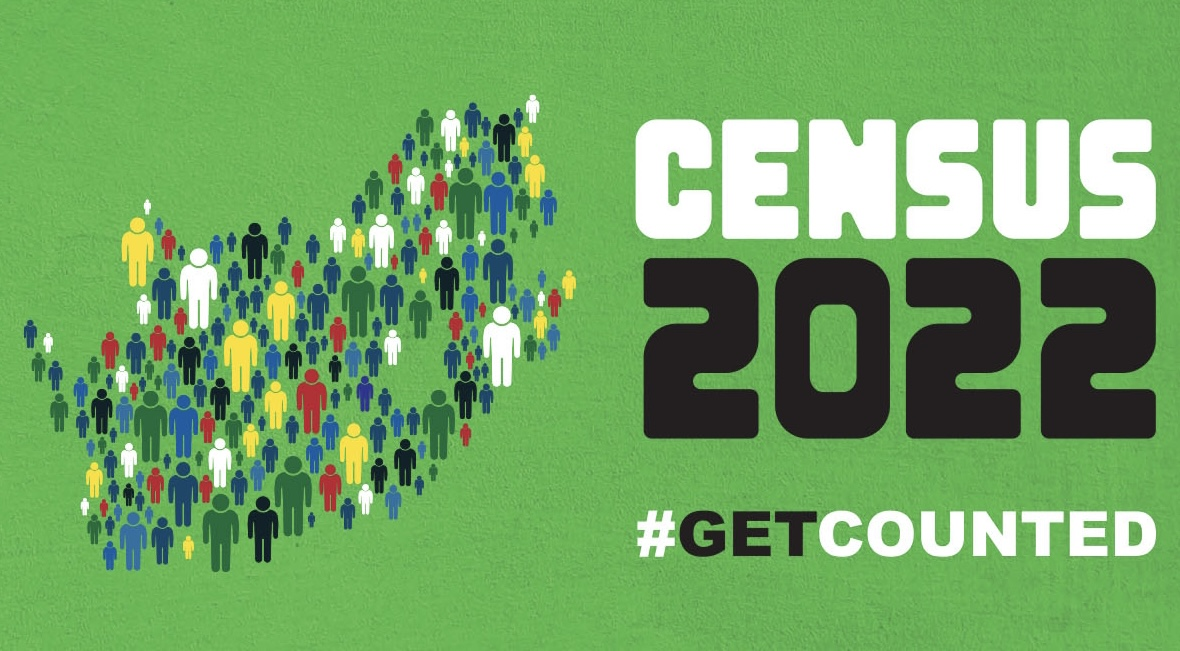

General information
- Country: South Africa
- Topics: Census topics: Demographics; Migration; Health; Fertility; Education; Employment & Income; Housing, Goods, & Services; Agriculture
- Authority: Stats SA
- Website: census.statssa.gov.za

Results
- Total population: 62 million (19.8% ▲)
- Most populous province: Gauteng
- Least populous province: Northern Cape

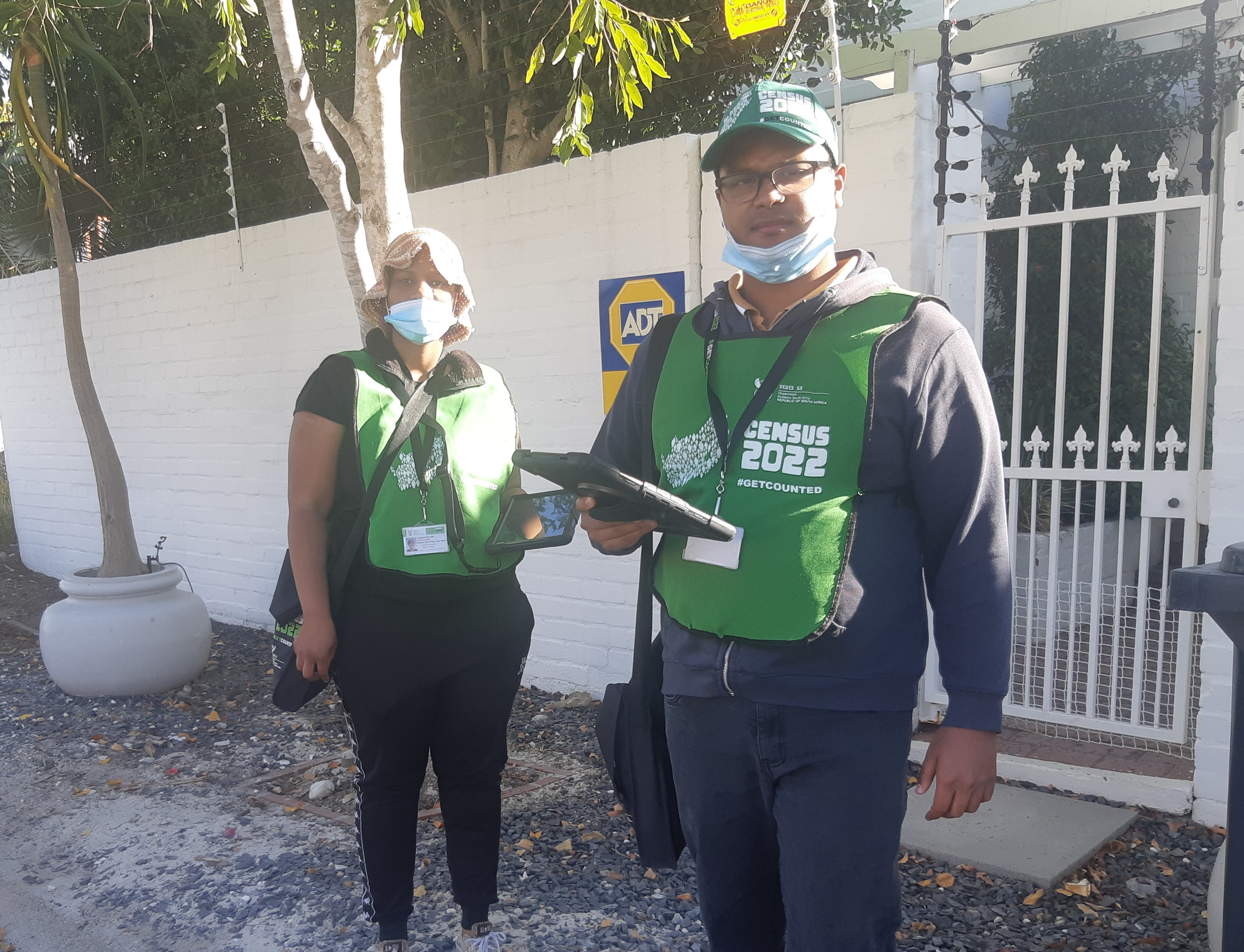
Two South African Census workers collecting data for the national census.

The South African National Census of 2022 is the 4th comprehensive census performed by Statistics South Africa (Stats SA). The census results were released on 10 October 2023 and recorded a total of 62 million people in the country. Collection issues and delays, partially due to the COVID-19 pandemic, resulted in uncertainty about the accuracy of the findings and increased costs of its implementation. The Census cost R4 billion to implement, roughly double the amount as the 2011 census.

== Key findings ==
The first reports of statistics, published on 10 October 2023, showed a total population of 62,027,503.

- Area: 1,220,813 square kilometres (471,359 sq mi)
- Population: 62,027,503
- Households: 17,828,778

=== Demographics ===
81,4% of the population is black African. The median age of the total population is 28 years.

Population change in South Africa by group
Rank	Group	2011 Census	2022 Census	Change	Percent change
1	Black African	41,000,938	50,486,856	9,485,918 ▲	20.74% ▲
2	Coloured	4,615,401	5,052,349	436,948 ▲	9.04% ▲
3	White	4,586,838	4,504,252	−82,586 ▼	-1.82% ▼
4	Asian or Indian	1,286,930	1,697,506	410,576 ▲	27.51% ▲
5	Other	280,454	247,353	−33,101▼	-12.54% ▼
Total population		51,770,560	61,988,314	10,217,755 ▲	19,8% ▲

Percentage distribution of South Africans by language spoken most often at home by province
First language	WC	EC	NC	FS	KZN	NW	GP	MP	LP	Population	SA
Afrikaans	41.2	9.6	54.6	10.3	1	5.2	7.7	3.2	2.3	6,583,111	10.6%
English	22	4.8	2.4	1.5	14.4	1	9.2	1.5	1	5,388,221	8.7%
IsiNdebele	0.2	0.1	0	0.1	0	0.4	3.1	9.9	1.1	1,053,711	1.7%
IsiXhosa	31.4	81.8	4.5	5.5	3.1	4.8	6.7	1	0.2	10,073,111	16.3%
IsiZulu	0.4	0.3	0.3	3.7	80	1.6	23.1	27.8	0.6	15,124,191	24.4%
Sepedi	0.1	0	0.1	0.2	0.1	2.1	12.6	10.3	55.5	6,198,831	10%
Sesotho	1	2.4	1.2	72.3	0.6	5.9	13.1	2.3	0.8	4,958,852	7.8%
Setswana	0.1	0	35.7	5.3	0	72.8	10.4	1.6	1.4	5,113,111	8.3%
SA Sign Language	0.01	0.01	0.02	0.01	0.01	0.03	0.02	0.02	0.02	12,397	0.02%
SiSwati (Swazi)	0	0	0	0.1	0	0.2	0.9	30.5	0.3	1,737,722	2.8%
Tshivenda	0.1	0	0.1	0.1	0	0.4	2.4	0.2	17.4	1,549,957	2.5%
Xitsonga	0.2	0.1	0.1	0.2	0	3.1	7	10.6	17.3	2,913,111	4.7%
Khoi, Nama & San languages	0	0.01	0.17	0.01	0	0.01	0.01	0.01	0.01	6,199	0.01%
Shona	2	0.5	0.4	0.3	0.3	1.6	2.1	0.6	1.6	743,739	1.2%
Chichewa, Nyanja	0.5	0.1	0.1	0	0.2	0.2	0.6	0.1	0	185,965	0.3%
Portuguese	0.1	0	0.1	0	0.1	0.2	0.3	0.3	0	123,977	0.2%
Other	0.7	0.4	0.3	0.3	0.2	0.3	0.7	0.3	0.4	247,953	0.4%
Total	100%	100%	100%	100%	100%	100%	100%	100%	100%	100%	100%

Population change in South Africa by gender
Rank	Gender	2011 Census	2022 Census	Change	Percent change
1	Female	26,581,769	31,948,746	5,366,977▲	18.33% ▲
2	Male	25,188,791	30,078,757	4,889,966 ▲	17.69% ▲

Population change in South Africa by province
Rank	Province	2011 Census	2022 Census	Change	Percent change
1	Gauteng	12,272,263	15,099,422	2,827,159 ▲	10.33% ▲
2	KwaZulu-Natal	10,267,300	12,423,907	2,156,607 ▲	9.5% ▲
3 ▲	Western Cape	5,822,734	7,433,019	1,610,285 ▲	12.15% ▲
4 ▼	Eastern Cape	6,562,053	7,230,304	668,251 ▲	4.85% ▲
5	Limpopo	5,404,868	6,572,720	1,167,852 ▲	9.75% ▲
6	Mpumalanga	4,039,939	5,143,324	1,103,385 ▲	12.02% ▲
7	North West	3,509,953	3,804,548	294,595 ▲	4.03% ▲
8	Free State	2,745,590	2,964,412	218,822 ▲	3.83% ▲
9	Northern Cape	1,145,861	1,355,946	210,085 ▲	8.4% ▲
Total population		51,770,560	62,027,602	10,257,041 ▲	9.01% ▲

== Collection issues ==
Originally Stats SA intended to implement the census exactly ten years after the 2011 census on 10 October 2021. The COVID-19 pandemic in South Africa caused repeated delays in planning and logistics of the census resulting in the census date being pushed back to 2 February 2022 with all data being collected by the end of that month. Due to additional logistical and implementation issues, complicated by the COVID-19 pandemic, the completion date was initially pushed back to 20 March, then 30 April for the whole country. An additional extension was made for the Western Cape.

After the publication of the census results it was reported that the under-count rate was 31% for the population as a whole but as high as 72% for Indian South Africans and 62% for White South Africans. The under-count rate being the highest in the Western Cape province.

The high under-count rate was reported as an issue of concern as it raised questions about the accuracy of the number of White, Indian, foreign-born and homeless people recorded in the census. In August 2024 STATS SA announced that due to reporting anomalies it would not be releasing key data such as figures on mortality, fertility, employment and household income.

These issues caused the South African academics, Professor Tom Moultrie and Emeritus Professor Rob Dorrington, to state that the statistics were likely not accurate enough for official use. Despite these criticisms, most notably the under-counting problem, STATS SA rejected calls from academia and other researchers for a recount and instead stated that the results were credible.

=== The Western Cape ===
The census taking period was extended in the Western Cape province to 14 May 2022 after it was announced that only 58% of the province's population had participated in it by late April that year; whilst around 80% of the country's whole population had been surveyed by the same date. The deadline was extended a second time in the Western Cape to 31 May as only 78% of the province's population had been counted by the end of the first extension period.

The issue of under-counting in the Western Cape Province was a serious issue of concern for the Western Cape Provincial government as it might result in fewer resources being allocated to the province by national government on a per-capita basis relative to the rest of the country.

Stats SA reported particular difficulty in getting an accurate census count of both White and Coloured residents which accounted for the low census participation rate in the Western Cape province. In the Western Cape census workers reported difficulty in contacting households with high walls - thereby preventing many surveys from being conducted - whilst other households refused to participate in the census. Other problems encountered by Stats SA in the province included not being able to hire enough census workers or being able to secure enough vehicles.

== See also ==
- South African National Census of 2001
- South African National Census of 2011
- Demographics of South Africa
- General Household Survey (South Africa)
