= List of South African provinces by fertility rate =

This article lists the provinces of South Africa by their average total fertility rate per woman according to data by Statistics South Africa.

Provinces by average fertility rate, 2001–2026
Rank	Province	2001–2006	2006–2011	2011–2016	2016–2021	2021–2026 (est.)
1	Limpopo	3.23	3.37	3.16	3.09	3.03
2	Eastern Cape	3.14	3.22	2.97	2.91	2.87
3	Northern Cape	3.03	3.08	2.83	2.67	2.63
4	KwaZulu-Natal	2.97	2.98	2.71	2.59	2.53
5	North West	3.08	3.20	2.78	2.57	2.52
6	Mpumalanga	2.79	2.88	2.41	2.29	2.27
7	Free State	2.69	2.84	2.48	2.33	2.27
8	Western Cape	2.31	2.42	2.16	2.04	2.01
9	Gauteng	2.20	2.36	2.10	1.89	1.82
