= Spar (South Africa) =

South African retail company

The Spar Group Ltd

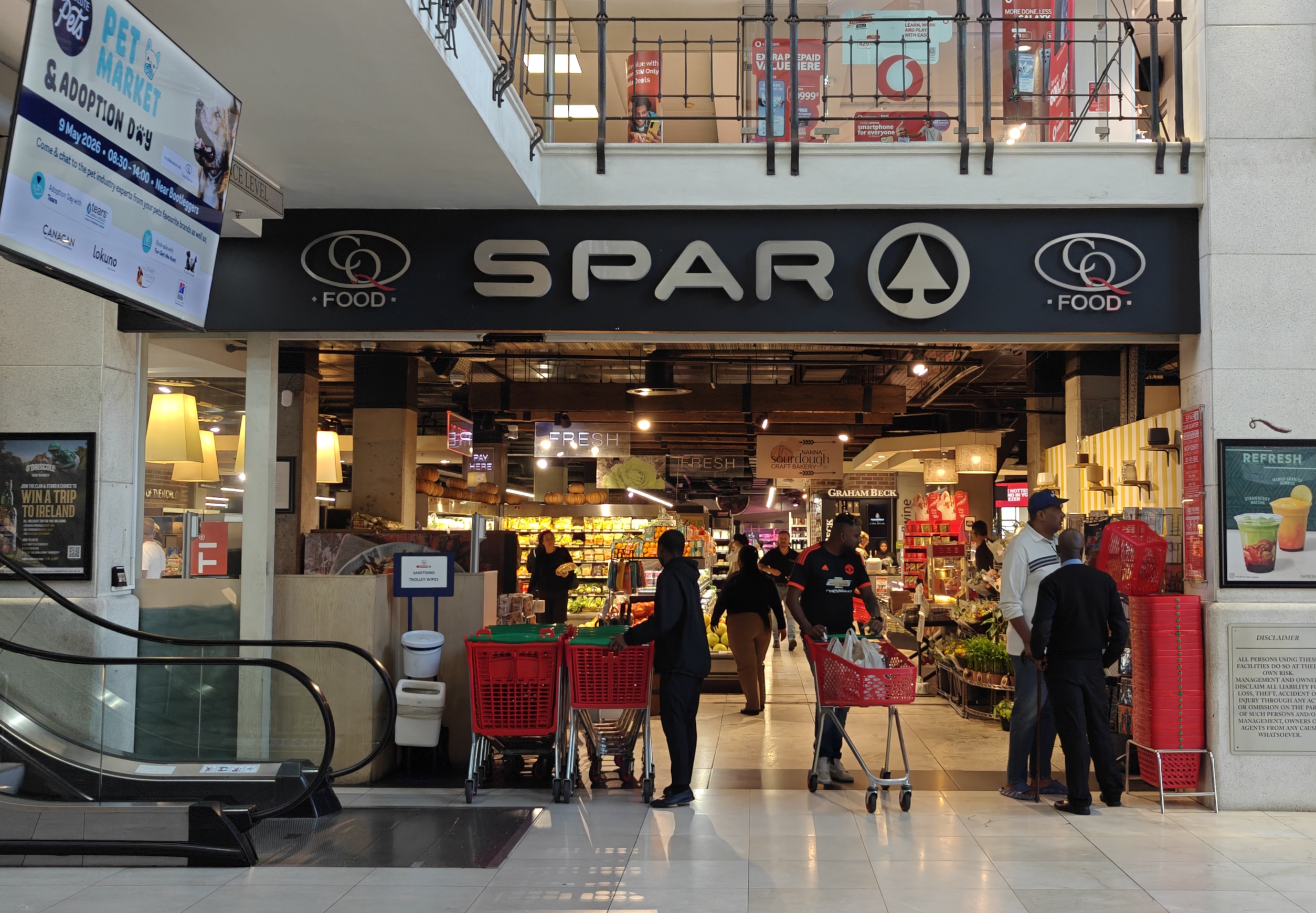
- Traded as: JSE: SPP
- ISIN: ZAE000058517
- Industry: Retail
- Founded: 1932; 94 years ago
- Headquarters: uMhlanga, KwaZulu-Natal, South Africa
- Number of locations: 3,726 (2025)
- Area served: Southern Africa; Sri Lanka; South West England; Ireland
- Key people: Reeza Isaacs (CEO); Lwazi Koyana (Interim Chairman)
- Brands: SPAR; KWIKSPAR; SUPERSPAR; Spar express Spar 2U; Pharmacy at SPAR tops! at SPAR; SaveMor; EUROSPAR; Build it BEAN TREE; Spar Gourmet; Pet Storey
- Revenue: ▼ R131.46 billion (2025)
- Operating income: ▼ R1.98 billion (2025)
- Net income: ▼ −R4.83 billion (2025)
- Total assets: ▼ R46.22 billion (2025)
- Total equity: ▼ R5.31 billion (2025)
- Number of employees: 6,778 (2025)
- Subsidiaries: SPAR Health; BWG Foods
- Website: thespargroup.com spar.co.za

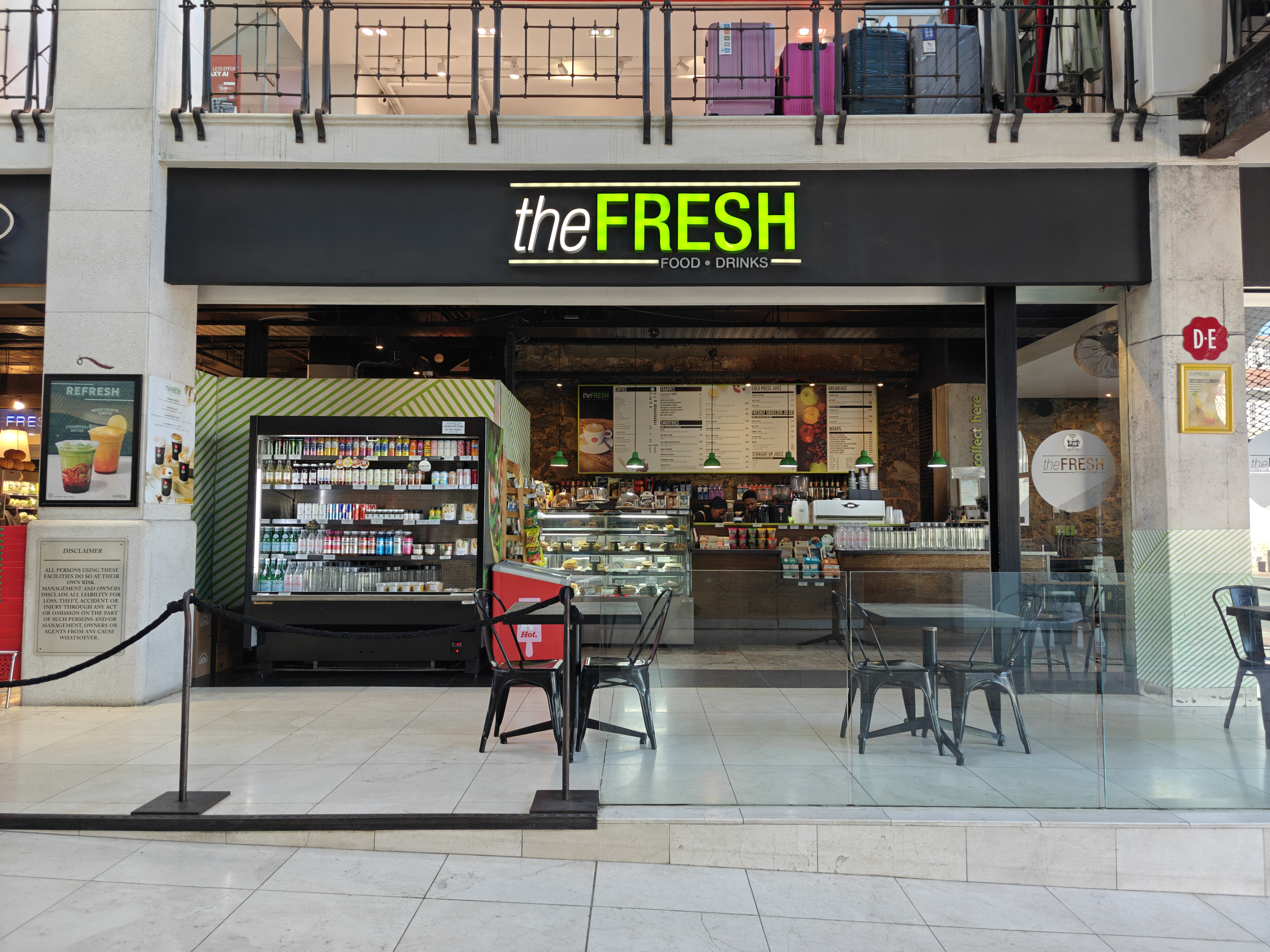
The Fresh, a Spar café in De Waterkant, Cape Town

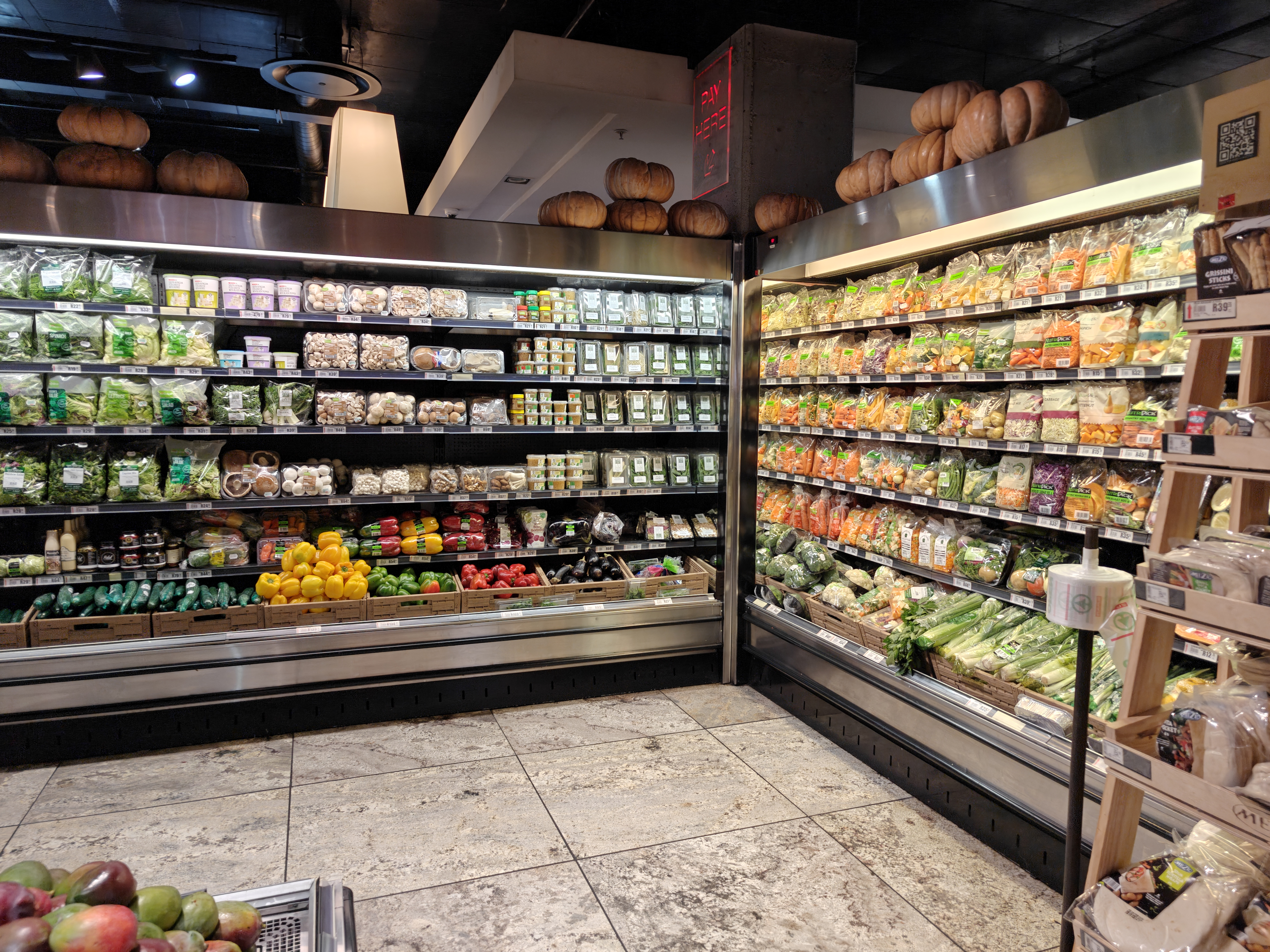
Fresh produce section in a Spar store

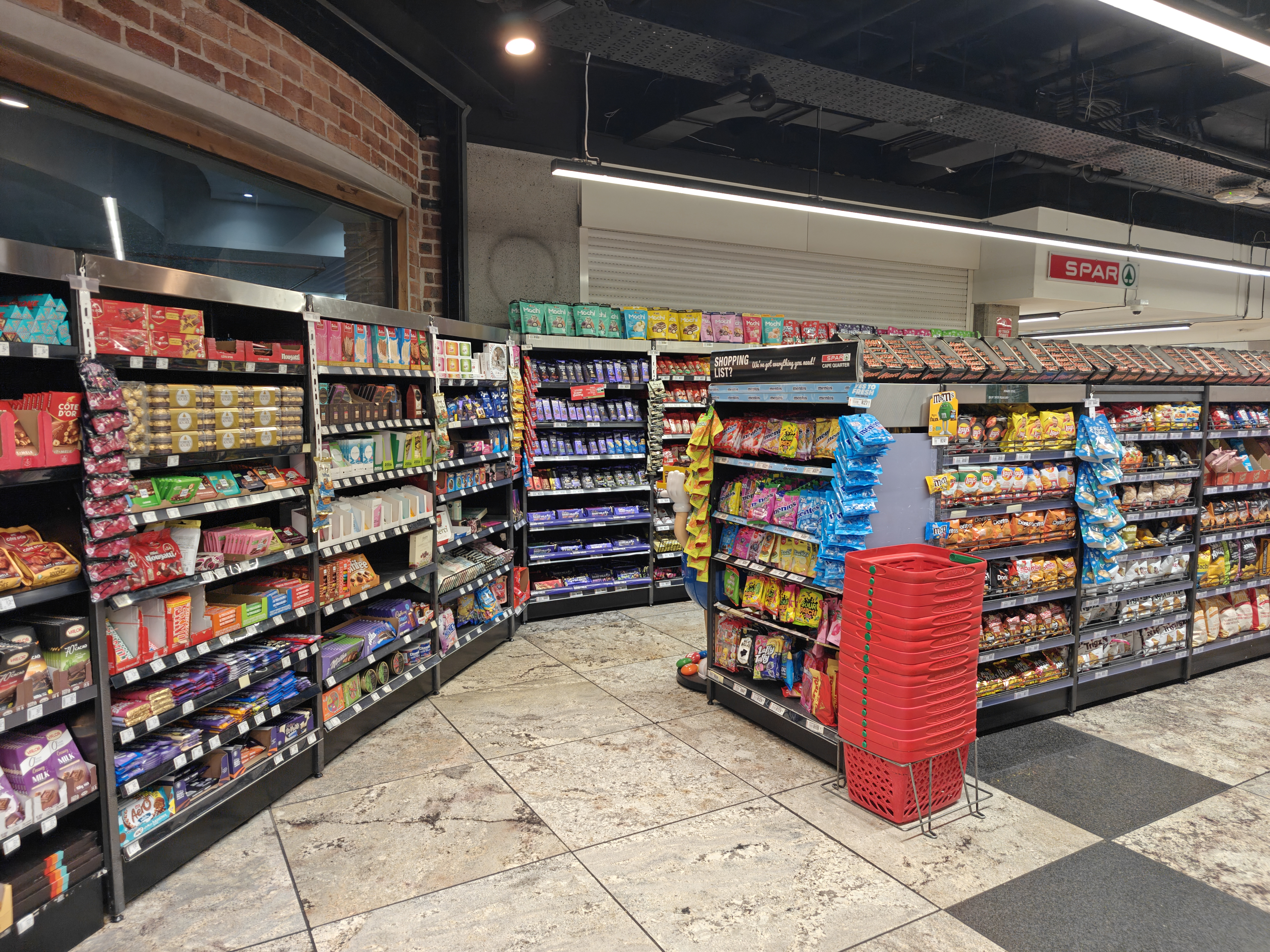
Confectionery section of a Spar outlet

The Spar Group Ltd, stylized as SPAR, is a major South African supermarket chain, and the country's largest by total number of stores. Headquartered in uMhlanga, KwaZulu-Natal, and traded on the JSE Limited, it holds licenses to operate stores in various countries under the Dutch SPAR International brand.

Spar was founded in 1932, and uses a mix of corporate and franchise models for its stores. The company also operates Spar express convenience stores, in partnership with Shell, which are located at the latter's forecourts.

The company has licenses to use the SPAR brand name in 11 countries including South Africa. Outside its home country, Spar has stores in Southern Africa, Sri Lanka, South West England, and Ireland.

The company serves as a warehousing and distribution business, supplying independent retailers (who operate under the Spar brand) with fresh produce and merchandise, as well as various support services. Retailers can use the Spar brand once they sign a membership agreement with the SPAR Guild of Southern Africa.

As of 2024, Spar has around 4,500 stores across 11 countries, and employs over 11,000 individuals.

== History ==
Spar's operations in South Africa were established in 1963, in Cape Town, by eight wholesalers, who began servicing 500 small retail outlets. The country was the first outside Europe to join the SPAR International organization.

In 1975, Spar launched its SaveMor brand, aimed at serving rural communities. A few years later, in 1979, the group opened a distribution center (DC) in KwaZulu-Natal.

Spar launched its building brand of stores, Build it, in 1985, and in 1990, the group moved its head office to Pinetown, KwaZulu-Natal, and launched the KWIKSPAR small format store chain. The 90s brought more developments for the group, with the establishment of its Eastern Cape distribution center in 1993, and the launch of its large format SUPERSPAR store brand in 1998.

In 2000, Spar launched its tops! at SPAR liquor store brand, and in 2004, the group listed on the JSE Limited, South Africa's largest stock exchange. Spar's third DC was opened in 2009, in Southern Gauteng.

In 2011, the SPAR express convenience store and Pharmacy at SPAR brands were launched.

SPAR bought an 80% shareholding in the BWG Foods, a company that operates in Ireland and South West England in 2014, the company is the master franchisee of SPAR stores there, alongside homegrown brands such as Mace.

In 2015, Spar launched a rewards program, whereby e-coupons would offer shoppers discounts on their favorite items.

In 2016, the group acquired a 60% stake in SPAR Switzerland, and in 2017, launched in Sri Lanka through a joint venture between SPAR and Ceylon Biscuits Limited, a Sri Lankan food manufacturer.

In 2021, SPAR assumed full ownership of BWG Foods.

In March 2022, the company launched its Spar 2U app-based delivery service, with a pilot at select stores in Joburg.

In May 2023, the company relaunched its rewards program, this time in the form of a Spar Rewards card. The card had over 1 million signups in its first 6 days. 40% of signups were by members new to Spar's rewards programs.

Spar ceased operations in Poland in 2023, after 3 years.

Also in 2023, the group increased its shareholding to 100% in the SPAR Encore private label brand. This followed the group's acquiring of a controlling stake in Encore in 2022. The business serves as a private label supplier for the group, and does the sourcing, packing, and supply of Spar's own-brand products, which includes certain groceries and other types of goods.

In January 2024, Spar announced that it was partnering with suburb-specific delivery providers, including KasiD in Tembisa and Delivery Ka Speed in Mamelodi and Hamanskraal, to facilitate Spar 2U home delivery in townships (traditionally underserved by such offerings).

In February 2024, South African commercial bank FNB partnered with Spar, so that the former's clients would begin earning eBucks rewards points for shopping at Spar.

In January 2025, Spar completed the sale of its Polish business as part of a broader strategy to optimize its portfolio and focus on its core markets. The business was sold to Polish wholesale and distribution company Specjał for approximately R185 million.

In May 2025, Spar launched Spar Mobile, a mobile virtual network operator (MVNO), which operates on MTN's network. Spar Mobile was developed in partnership with megsApp, another MVNO that operates using MTN's infrastructure.

The company linked the MVNO's data packages to its rewards program. At the time, Spar said South Africa's airtime and data market was estimated to be worth R100 billion annually, with 86% of transactions being prepaid.

In June 2025, Spar's CEO Max Oliva resigned, after having been with the business for three decades.

In July 2025, Spar partnered with Uber Eats to facilitate home delivery of Spar and tops! at Spar items via the Uber app.

In September 2025, the group announced it had sold its Swiss business for R1 billion, and was planning on selling its UK company as well, in order to focus on South African retail.

In the same month, Spar launched its chain of pet stores. Operating under the new Pet Storey brand, the first outlet opened in Boksburg. The store was originally part of local company Petmasters, and was rebranded to Pet Storey. At the launch, Spar confirmed it had plans to expand the brand to between 25 and 30 stores by the end of 2025, and a minimum of 100 stores by the end of 2026.

The company was the third entrant into the pet store retail chain sector in SA, after its larger competitors Absolute Pets and Petshop Science, which are both also owned by local supermarket companies. When the first Pet Storey outlet opened, competing major South African retail chain Woolworths' subsidiary, Absolute Pets had a total of 180 stores, and retail chain Checkers' subsidiary Petshop Science had 144 locations. Retail chain Food Lover's Market had also begun rolling out independent VetsMart stores.

Also in September 2025, a video posted by a visitor to the first Pet Storey outlet claimed that the retail chain sold puppies from its stores - something not commonly done in South Africa, and not by any competing pet store chains. After public backlash due to concerns about animal health and safety in retail outlets, local media outlet Business Report contacted Spar.

The latter stated that via a partnership with company Petmasters (which was rebranded to Pet Storey), it sold various animals from that particular outlet. It said that this was the case before the store was bought and rebranded. Spar said it did not have plans to replicate those sales at other stores as Pet Storey expanded. Furthermore, Spar said it was committed to animal welfare, and would seek to rehome any remaining puppies at that store while they were awaiting sale, by contacting animal welfare organizations. After this, the company stated it would no longer take part in puppy sales.

Facing continued inquiries, a day later, Spar stated that it would no longer participate in the sale of any kind of animal.

At the start of October 2025, the South African Competition Commission approved the acquisition of pharmacy group Aptekor by Spar's wholly owned subsidiary SPAR Health. The acquisition included Aptekor Sneldiens and Aptekor Wholesale, and is part of Spar's plan to increase its number of pharmacies from 125 at the time of the deal, to 250 by the end of 2028.

In November 2025, the company launched a new format store, called Spar Gourmet, in Zimbali Oasis, KwaZulu-Natal. The format specifically aims to compete in the premium grocery market, for high income earners, competing with the likes of Woolworths and Checkers FreshX.

The following month, Spar announced that it would begin rolling out up to 100 more Gourmet stores across South Africa.

In December 2025, Spar moved into its new headquarters in uMhlanga, Kwa-Zulu Natal.

In May 2026, Spar agreed to sell the principal assets of its UK business, Appleby Westward Group, to the British SPAR wholesaler A. F. Blakemore. The transaction included the license to operate Spar in South West England, 71 company-owned stores, and associated logistics infrastructure, while a further 63 stores were to be sold to third party operators. The transactions were expected to generate approximately R290 million in gross proceeds, be completed in stages, and conclude by September 2026.

== Operations ==
Spar has 3,726 stores, located across eight countries in which it has obtained name use licensing from Dutch retail company SPAR International. The former uses a mix of corporate-owned and franchise-owned models. Certain corporate stores are run continuously by Spar, while others are run by Spar only until they're handed over to franchisees. This strategy is used in all of Spar's countries of operation except England, where all its stores are corporate-owned.

The nonprofit SPAR Guild of Southern Africa manages the membership of retailers wanting to use the Spar brand. Once members, the retailers have access to Spar resources. Spar, for its part, sources produce from farmers, and supplies it to stores via warehouses, or via direct-to-store deliveries.

The company operates a total of 12 distribution centers, eight of which are located in Southern Africa.

Spar's store formats are as follows:

- SPAR (standard format stores)
- SPAR Gourmet (standard format, premium grocery segment stores)
- KWIKSPAR (small format stores)
- SUPERSPAR (large format stores)
- tops! at SPAR (dedicated liquor stores, as per SA law)
- SPAR express (convenience stores)

=== Pet Storey ===
Spar South Africa operates a chain of pet stores, under its Pet Storey brand. The subsidiary, founded in 2025, has a total of 22 locations across South Africa as of 2026.

== Sustainability ==
Spar's 2U home delivery service uses electric motorbikes and tricycles, reducing carbon emissions.

The group's SPAR supplier development program is aimed at empowering small retail suppliers.

The group's distribution centers generated 9,761 MWh of power, and recycled over 19,000 tons of cardboard and over 2,300 tons of paper, in the 2024 financial year. In the same year, Spar spent a total of R20.3 million on CSR initiatives.

Through the SPAR Rural Hub program, the group aims to empower small-scale farmers, by providing them with resources, training, and access to markets.
