= General Household Survey =

General Household Survey may refer to:

- General Household Survey (South Africa), a national household survey conducted by Stats SA
- General Household Survey (United Kingdom), a defunct household survey conducted by the Office for National Statistics
