= Fatal dog attacks in South Africa =

South Africa records more than 1,000 serious dog attacks each year, with about 100 of them proving fatal, and roughly 60% of these are attributed to pit bulls or pit bull-type mixed breeds. This pattern of attacks, especially on children, has repeatedly provoked bystanders and communities to retaliate violently against the dogs involved and their owners. These incidents have sparked ongoing debate over breed-specific legislation, the enforcement of municipal bylaws, and the responsibilities of dog owners, and they have drawn repeated public statements from the National Council of Societies for the Prevention of Cruelty to Animals (NSPCA) and provincial SPCA branches, along with prosecutions of both negligent owners and people who killed dogs in retaliation.

== Fatal attacks on people ==
A cluster of fatal pit bull attacks in late 2022 drew sustained national attention. On 26 September 2022, ten-year-old Storm Nuku was mauled to death by his family's two pit bulls at their home in Gelvandale, Gqeberha, while playing with two other children, and police shot both dogs. On 12 November 2022, eight-year-old Olebogeng Mosime, a Grade 3 pupil at Roseview Primary, was killed in Vista Park, Bloemfontein, after a neighbour's pit bull jumped a fence into his yard and seized him by the neck and chest. The dog was shot dead by police at the scene, and in the days that followed, residents of Bloemfontein voluntarily surrendered 49 pit bulls to the local SPCA. On 20 November 2022, three-year-old Keketso Innocent Saule was killed by two pit bulls belonging to 21-year-old Lebohang Pali in Sekoti Mpate Phomolong, Hennenman, Free State. A crowd of residents gathered wanting to attack both the dogs and Pali, who was removed to safety by police, while SPCA staff who responded were also attacked by the crowd. One of the two dogs was burned to death by community members, while the other was removed by the SPCA and euthanised. Pali was charged with keeping dangerous dogs under the Animals Amendment Act and granted bail of R300. On 23 November 2022, fifteen-month-old Reuben le Roux was killed on a smallholding in Gonubie, East London, when a pit bull named Whisky seized him by the throat and dragged him roughly three metres across the yard. The dog's owner, Noleen Fourie, had it euthanised afterward. It was reported the dog had killed two other dogs in the preceding year. On 27 November 2022, 37-year-old Zimkhitha Brenda Gaga was killed by three pit bulls in Port Alfred, Eastern Cape, after the dogs escaped their yard through damaged perimeter fencing. On 3 December 2022, 39-year-old Floyd Metsileng was killed by pit bulls in the North West province, and both dogs involved were subsequently euthanised by the NSPCA.

More fatal attacks continued in following years. On 7 January 2023, former Zambian international footballer Philemon Mulala, 60, was mauled to death by his own three dogs at his home in Lichtenburg, North West. His wife discovered his body after a period of load shedding during which the dogs had been barking. On 23 December 2022 (reported January 2023), 43-year-old Metlitta Sekole was mauled by two pit bulls while walking in Senwabarwana, Limpopo, at around 5 a.m. She was rescued by residents and taken to hospital but died from her injuries. The dogs's owner, Nchabeleng Charles Masebe, was charged with culpable homicide after family and friends of Sekole marched to the local police station demanding his prosecution. It was reported the same two dogs had attacked farm workers at Masebe's property the previous day. Five-year-old Zibele Liyakhanya Mthi was killed by two pit bulls in Dyamala village outside Alice, Eastern Cape, while walking between his grandmother's and mother's homes ahead of a Good Friday church service. His mother found him wounded on the road. On 5 November 2024, four-year-old Simikuso "Simi" Ntswayibana died in Sedgefield, Knysna, after a pack of dogs attacked him while he was playing with friends after school. His grandfather noted it was not the first time Simi had been bitten, stating that a week earlier the family had confronted the dog owner about a previous attack, and his body was found after a night-long search involving the community, police and a local councillor.

In June 2024, Nomathemba Kweleta, a mother in Bloemfontein, was mauled to death by four pit bulls, reportedly after she had smacked her son. Her boyfriend, the dogs's owner, was arrested on a charge of culpable homicide, and three of the dogs were shot dead at the scene by police, while the fourth was taken to the SPCA with its puppies. In a separate Bloemfontein case, Keabetswe Moroane was convicted of culpable homicide by the Bloemfontein Regional Court in July 2025 after her pit bull broke free from her yard, entered a neighbouring property, and killed eight-year-old Olebogeng Mosime, who was playing in a garage. The National Prosecuting Authority stated the court found she had failed to maintain adequate safety measures despite prior complaints from neighbours about the dog, and she was due for sentencing on 2 September 2025.

On 5 June 2026, an unidentified woman believed to be in her thirties was found mauled to death in Magaretha Prinsloo Street, Klerksdorp, North West. Eight dogs from a nearby property were removed by the SPCA and euthanised. Around the same period, a 39-year-old man in Vryburg, North West, died in hospital after being attacked by two pit bulls, and police opened an inquest. Animals 24-7, a non-profit that tracks dog attack fatalities, listed this as the January 2026 death of a 39-year-old Pakistani national in Vryburg. On 4 July 2026 (reported), 28-year-old Nomvula Ndlela was mauled to death by three dogs in Woodlands, Durban South, after being found by a passing motorist who initially mistook the attack for dogs tearing at a bin bag. A local councillor blamed poor enforcement of municipal animal bylaws. Days later, a woman was mauled to death by a pit bull in Montclair, south of Durban. The Durban and Coast SPCA said the dogs involved had been loose on the street rather than confined to a property. The same period of reporting referenced further fatalities, including a man with mental health challenges mauled to death by pit bulls in Waterval Boven, Mpumalanga, and a fatal mauling in Mitchells Plain, Western Cape.

=== Notable incidents ===
In August 2017, 58-year-old farm worker Dawid Loff was killed at a property in Jakkalskraal, Kranshoek, near Plettenberg Bay, when a pit bull tied on the property broke loose and attacked him. The dog was euthanised by its owner in cooperation with, Plettenberg Bay Animal Welfare Society (PAWS).Weeks earlier, in the same district, 55-year-old Nonzwakazi Matiwane was bitten by dogs while collecting wood near Concordia, Knysna, and later died in hospital in George. In October 2024, 58-year-old Stevens Mabuse, a caretaker of pit bulls, was mauled to death by his employer's pit bull at Marapyane, Mmametlhake, Mpumalanga. His employer was later identified as Phillemon Letwaba, former CEO of the National Lotteries Commission. According to a South African Police Service (SAPS) statement, Mabuse lived on the property and was attacked upon returning from an outing in the early hours of 18 October 2024.

=== Stray and loose dog attacks ===
Deaths involving loose or stray dog packs, rather than a single owned animal, have also been recorded in informal settlements and townships. In 2011, a three-year-old boy was killed by a pack of dogs in Philippi, Cape Town. The incident brought renewed attention to the city's stray dog crisis, with Mayoral committee member JP Smith stating the city had at least 230,000 stray dogs. The Cape of Good Hope SPCA noted that in Khayelitsha alone, dogs outnumbered people by three to one, largely due to a lack of sterilisation.On 27 June 2025, three-year-old Sibongakonke Hosiyana was mauled to death by five dogs while walking alone through the Marathon informal settlement, Germiston, Ekurhuleni, on her way to visit her grandfather. Ward councillor Geoffrey Mthembu confirmed it was the third reported attack involving the same group of dogs in the area, with two previous attacks having been survived by other children. Following her death, residents demolished the shack believed to belong to the dogs' owner, who fled the area, and killed seven puppies born to the dogs.

== Retaliatory and mob killings of dogs ==
Communities have responded to fatal or serious dog attacks with immediate violence against the dogs involved. Following the November 2022 killing of three-year-old Keketso Saule in Hennenman, residents attacked one of the two pit bulls with garden spades and stones before setting it alight. The same weekend in Cape Town, after a girl was mauled by three pit bulls in Gatesville, Athlone, a crowd stoned, stabbed and burned the three dogs to death. The Cape of Good Hope SPCA confirmed it was the second incident of dogs being set alight in a single weekend. In that same Athlone incident, a Cape of Good Hope SPCA inspector found the dogs already burning and extinguished the flames, and the SPCA's chief inspector, Jaco Pieterse, urged the public to contact the SPCA rather than take action themselves. In Philippi, following the death of three-year-old Philasande Mpokotho, who was dragged from his family's shack and mauled by a pack of dogs in Sweet Home Farm informal settlement, the community went on a rampage the following day, killing at least two dogs. Cape of Good Hope SPCA CEO Allan Perrins confirmed the dogs choked to death from the beatings they sustained.

In March 2025, after four-year-old C'Jay Nel was mauled and left in critical condition in Chris Hani Park, Macassar, Western Cape (the bite narrowly missing his heart), community members killed the dog responsible. Police confirmed the animal died of its injuries, and a case of animal cruelty was opened, with those responsible for the dog's death facing criminal charges. The Cape of Good Hope SPCA, which said it was not involved in the killing, stated that the cruel death of any animal was not justifiable.

== Legal and organisational responses ==
The National Council of SPCAs (NSPCA) has repeatedly stated that it does not rehome dogs assessed as aggressive and euthanises them instead, and has urged the public to report dog owners who fail to comply with municipal bylaws, the Animals Protection Act of 1962, and animal welfare standards, rather than take retaliatory action. Following the 2022 cluster of fatalities, the Sizwe Kupelo Foundation, founded by firefighter Sizwe Kupelo after the death of Storm Nuku, gathered more than 130,000 signatures on a petition calling on the Department of Agriculture, Land Reform and Rural Development, then headed by Minister Thoko Didiza, to ban pit bulls as domestic pets in South Africa. Kupelo separately denounced mob attacks on dogs, calling instead for victims' families to pursue civil lawsuits against negligent owners. The Pit Bull Federation of South Africa has opposed a breed ban, arguing instead for stronger enforcement of existing laws against negligent owners. The NSPCA has said it does not support a breed-specific ban, calling instead for stronger regulation and enforcement of the keeping of dogs generally. Some municipalities have introduced local measures. Mangaung metro announced in January 2023 that all dog owners in the city would be required to obtain a licence and complete a form of training.

=== Prosecutions ===
Dog owners have faced prosecution following fatal attacks, though outcomes have varied. Lebohang Pali was charged only with keeping dangerous dogs following the death of Keketso Saule. Nchabeleng Charles Masebe was charged with culpable homicide following the death of Metlitta Sekole. In 2025, a Bloemfontein woman was convicted of culpable homicide by the Bloemfontein Magistrate's Court after her dog killed a child, with the court finding she had been negligent despite repeated prior complaints from neighbours. The National Prosecuting Authority confirmed the conviction. Animals 24-7, an American non-profit organisation that compiles global dog attack data, has reported that owners of dogs involved in several 2022 South African fatalities were not criminally charged at all.

The NSPCA has pursued unrelated prosecutions against dog owners and breeders for cruelty and neglect, including a 2026 conviction of a Pietermaritzburg breeder, Amod Sheik, for keeping 17 pit bull-type dogs in unacceptable conditions, and a multi-year prosecution culminating in the conviction of a breeder identified as Perreira on 59 counts of animal cruelty following a 2016 raid in Roodepoort.

=== Dogs used against people and authorities ===
Dogs have also featured in confrontations between residents and police during law-enforcement operations. On 18 January 2025, a young man in Delft, Western Cape, was arrested after allegedly setting three pit bulls on Anti-Gang Unit officers conducting a search for firearms. Officers used rubber bullets to repel the dogs, and a firearm, ammunition and drugs were subsequently found on the property. On 16 June 2026 (Youth Day), during an anti-gang operation in Joe Slovo, Heidedal, Free State, a 45-year-old homeowner allegedly set two pit bulls on officers executing a search warrant. Officers evaded the dogs and found crystal meth and cash on the property. After the homeowner's arrest, a crowd gathered outside, pelted officers and police vehicles with stones, and police used stun grenades and rubber bullets to disperse the crowd. Four people were arrested, including the homeowner, who was charged with assault with intent to cause grievous bodily harm for setting the dogs on the officers, and drug-dealing charges.

== See also ==
- List of fatal dog attacks
- Just Nuisance
- Kennel Union of Southern Africa
