= Blue Route Mall =

Major shopping mall in Cape Town

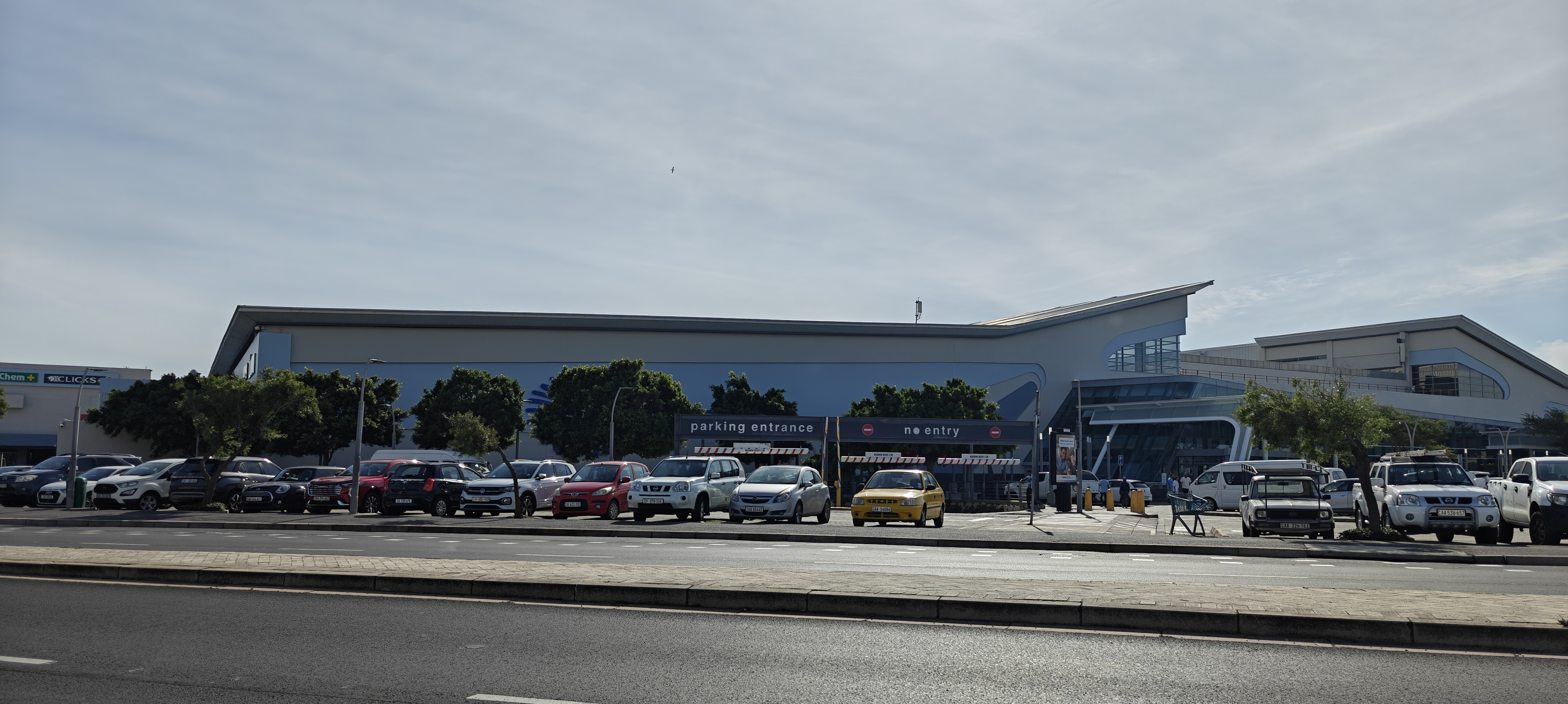
- One of the entrances to Blue Route, on the south side of the mall, with surface lot parking in the foreground
- Alternative names: Blue Route

General information
- Type: Shopping mall
- Architectural style: Contemporary
- Location: Tokai Road, Dreyersdal, Cape Town, South Africa
- Coordinates: 34.0634668°S 18.4540966°E
- Current tenants: Woolworths, Checkers, Edgars, Clicks, and House & Home, among others
- Opening: 1970s; 55 years ago
- Renovated: 2012; 14 years ago
- Renovation cost: R862 million
- Client: Fountainhead Property Trust (original owners)
- Owner: Redefine Properties
- Landlord: Redefine Properties; Broll Properties (Center manager)

Height
- Height: 3 stories (including 1 for underground parking)
- Roof: Opposed slopes

Technical details
- Floor count: 3
- Floor area: 56,891 m^{2} (612,370 sq ft)

Renovating team
- Architect: Peerutin Karol (Louis Karol)
- Renovating firm: Grinaker-LTA
- Structural engineer: Aurecon Group (Civil and structural)
- Other designers: BFH de Jager (project managers); CNdV Africa (Environmental planners); EQF (tenant coordinators)
- Quantity surveyor: MLC

Other information
- Number of stores: 137
- Parking: 3,000 bays (including 1,300 undercover)

Website
- https://blueroutemall.co.za

Blue Route Mall (often referred to as simply Blue Route) is a shopping mall situated in the predominantly residential neighborhood of Dreyersdal, in the Southern Suburbs region of Cape Town, South Africa.

Blue Route is one of Cape Town's oldest malls, having opened in the 1970s. It was completely rebuilt in 2012, to create a more modern, functional mall, based on community needs.

The mall features 137 stores, including a variety of restaurants and take-out chains, as well as both covered and uncovered parking totaling 3,000 bays. It is easily accessed by the nearby M3 freeway, and M4 road.

== History ==
Blue Route Mall was opened in the 1970s, and has served as a major retail destination in the Southern Suburbs of Cape Town ever since. The original mall featured 103 tenants.

The mall gets its name from the Malabari word for "peacock", because of the bird's blue tail.

In 2001, the mall's then-owner, Fountainhead Property Trust, decided that it was no longer serving the needs of its community, and began looking for a solution to this, which ended up being a full rebuild.

=== Rebuild ===
The building was somewhat run down in the 2010s, and was rebuilt in 2012. The new mall was designed by architecture firm Peerutin Karol. Louis Karol of Peerutin Karol is the architect who designed the Victoria Wharf retail center at the V&A Waterfront; one of Cape Town's largest shopping malls. The rebuild was project managed by BFH de Jager, and CNdV Africa served as the environmental planners. Landscaping was done by ARG Landscape Architects, and construction by Grinaker-LTA. Tenant coordinators EQF managed existing retailers.

A full communications plan was developed, in order to keep stakeholders, including the community, abreast of developments and progress.

Demolition of the original mall, starting with the upper and lower parking decks, began in April 2010, and the new mall opened in March 2012. The estimated cost of the redevelopment was R862 million.

The redevelopment was carried out in numerous phases. After the first phase (demolition of the existing mall), the second phase was dedicated to bulk excavations, including stripping the back section of the building to prepare it for demolition, and piling the open parking area.

The third phase commenced the construction of the new mall, by building the ground floor structure, completed in early 2011. The remainder of the structure, including the first floor, ring beams, and plant room, was completed around mid-2011.

The fourth and final phase was dedicated to adding finishes throughout the mall. Following this, the mall was completed in March 2012, with its parking finished in September 2012.

The new mall considered traffic in the surrounding area. The footprint of the new mall was designed so as not to negatively affect the flow of traffic to roads surrounding Blue Route. The introduction of a new slip road off Tokai Road was anticipated to reduce the traffic pressure on the existing Vans Road intersection.

Trade at Blue Route continued during the 30-month redevelopment period, with existing tenants temporarily rehoused on site during construction. The new mall added approximately 8,000 square meters of retail space, however the footprint of the mall actually decreased. The number of stores increased from 103 to 137. As parking was an issue with the original mall, the redesign included 3,000 bays.

The redesigned mall features a dedicated food court, built on the north-west elevation. It comprises 2 retail floors of about 29,000 square meters each, as well as double-volume walkways, large sculptural skylights, an extensive balcony, and restaurant and public areas with panoramic views. The outside parking area features pedestrian walkways indigenous trees, dedicated taxi bays, and bench seating. Blue Route Mall now operates a CCTV camera system and 24-hour security guards.

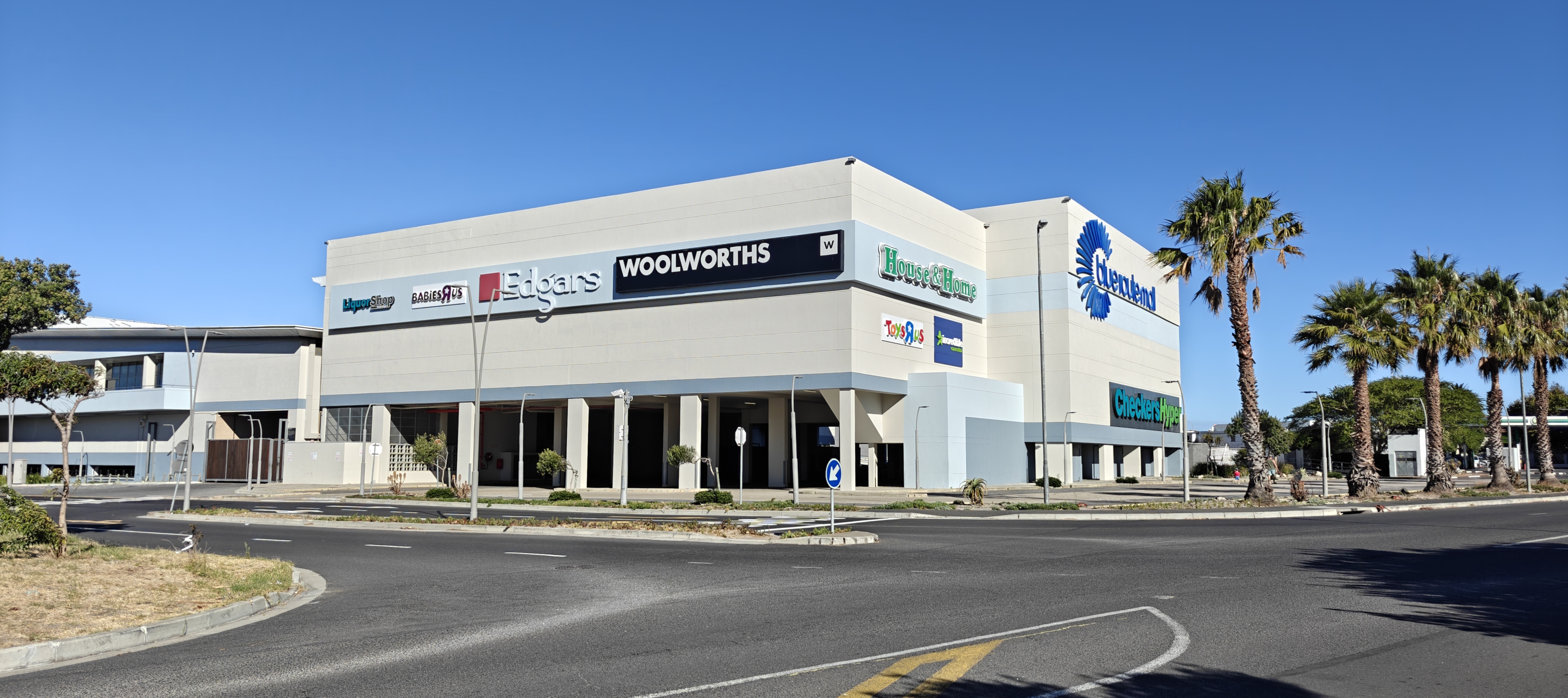
Rear of the mall

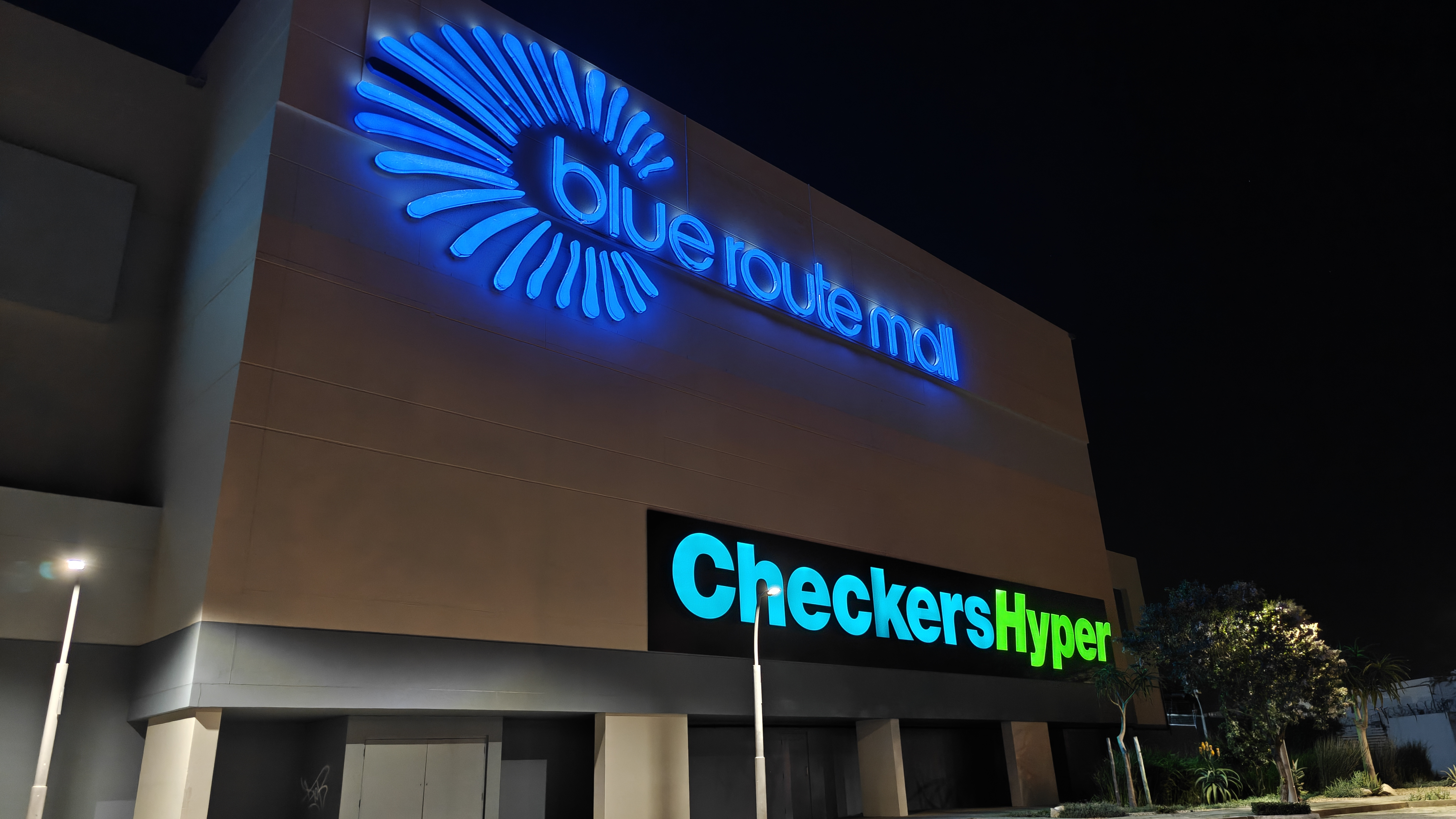
Signage on the side of the mall

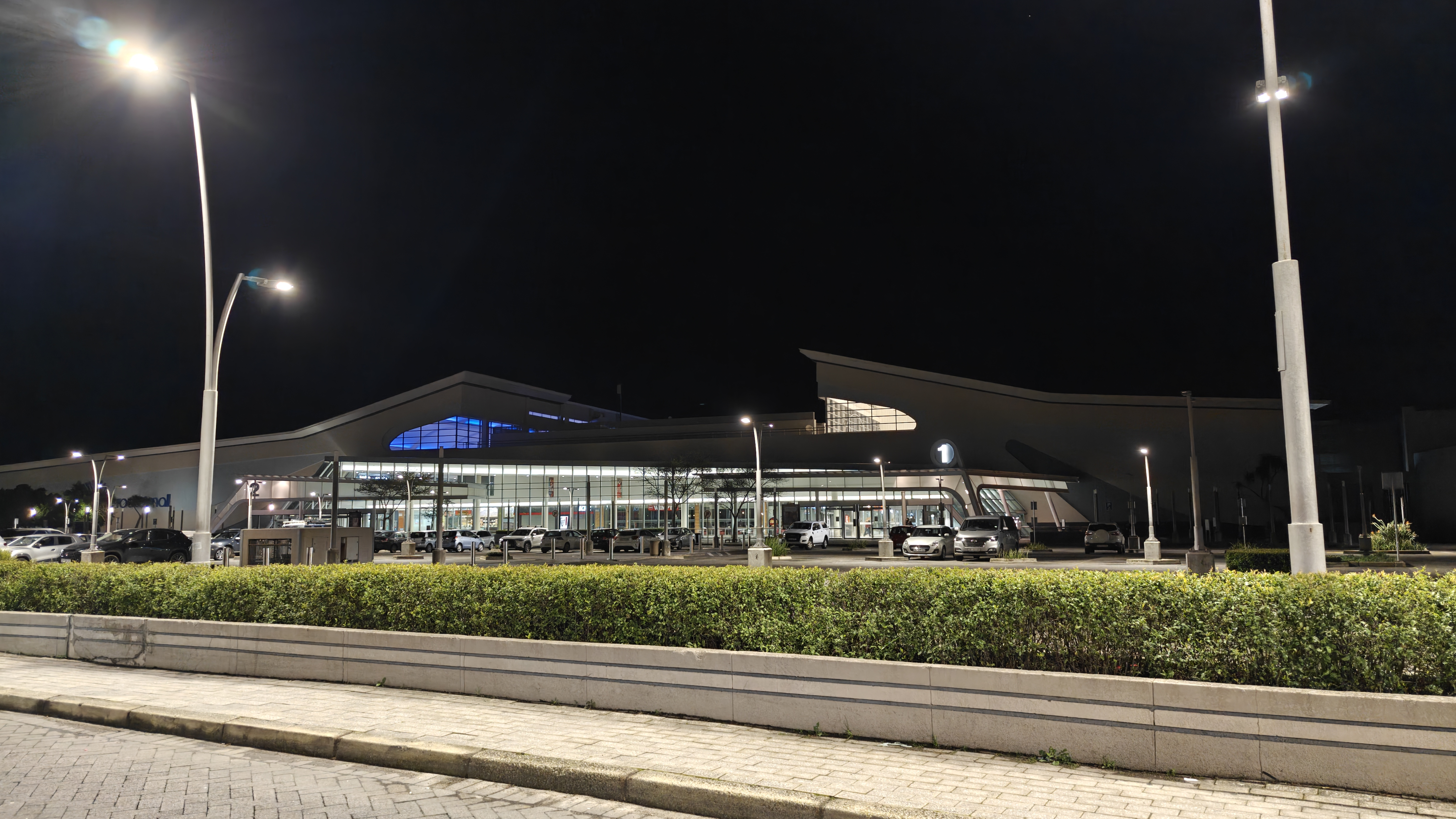
Blue Route Mall at night

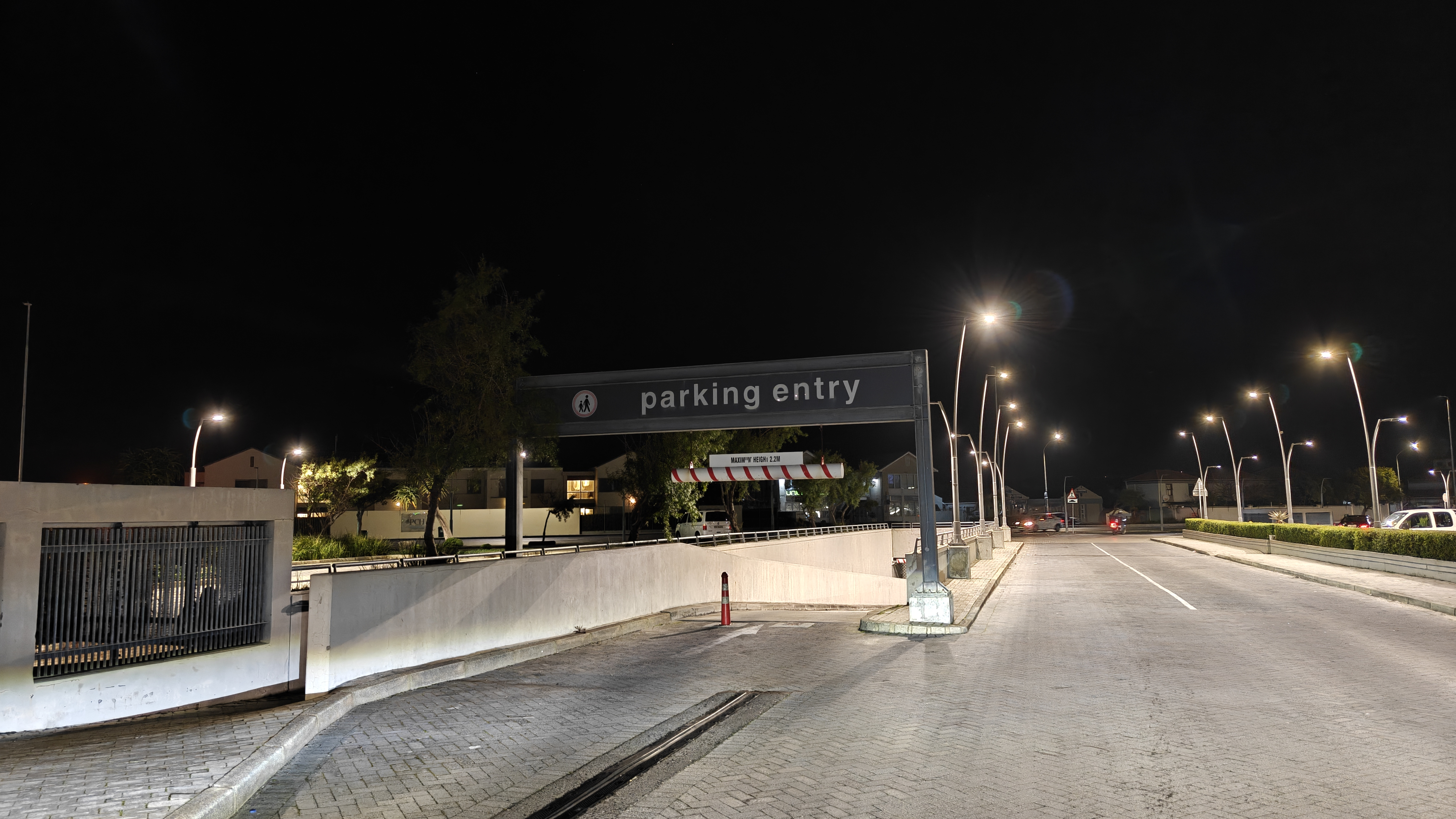
One of the mall's underground parking entrances

=== Recent developments ===
Former anchor tenant and South African supermarket chain, Pick n Pay, completed a revamp of its Blue Route Mall clothing store in April 2021, as part of a pilot to test a new sustainable design for its stores. The store received a Green Star Interiors v1 rating of 4 stars for its sustainability practices.

In 2023, the South African Post Office closed its Blue Route Mall branch.

In September 2024, Pick n Pay announced that it would be closing its Blue Route Mall store, along with other outlets located at multiple other shopping malls. The move allowed Blue Route Mall owner, Redefine, to optimize its retail space and increase rental income. It was reported at the time that competing supermarket chain, Checkers, was more popular with shoppers, and therefore generated more revenue for the property investment firm.

== Features ==
Blue Route Mall is a medium-sized shopping mall, and a significant one amongst those in the Southern Suburbs region of Cape Town, in terms of the number and breadth of stores it offers residents.

The center is home to 137 stores, covering around 57,000 square meters, and features 3,000 bays of parking - some as part of a surface lot, and some (1,300) covered and behind paid access. It also has its own generator farm, to provide full, continuous power in the event of an area outage.

Categories of retail and services offered at Blue Route include pet supplies, groceries, homeware, clothing and sportswear, outdoor gear, printing, jewelry, furniture, banking, cellular, and baking.

Anchor tenants at the mall include Woolworths (with a 6,000 square meter store), Checkers, Clicks, Zone Fitness, House & Home, Mr Price, Edgars (with a 4,000 square meter store), Dischem, and Toys R Us.

== Ownership ==
Blue Route Mall is owned by property investment company Redefine, which also owns Kenilworth Center - another mall located in Cape Town's Southern Suburbs.
