= Petshop Science =

South African retail company

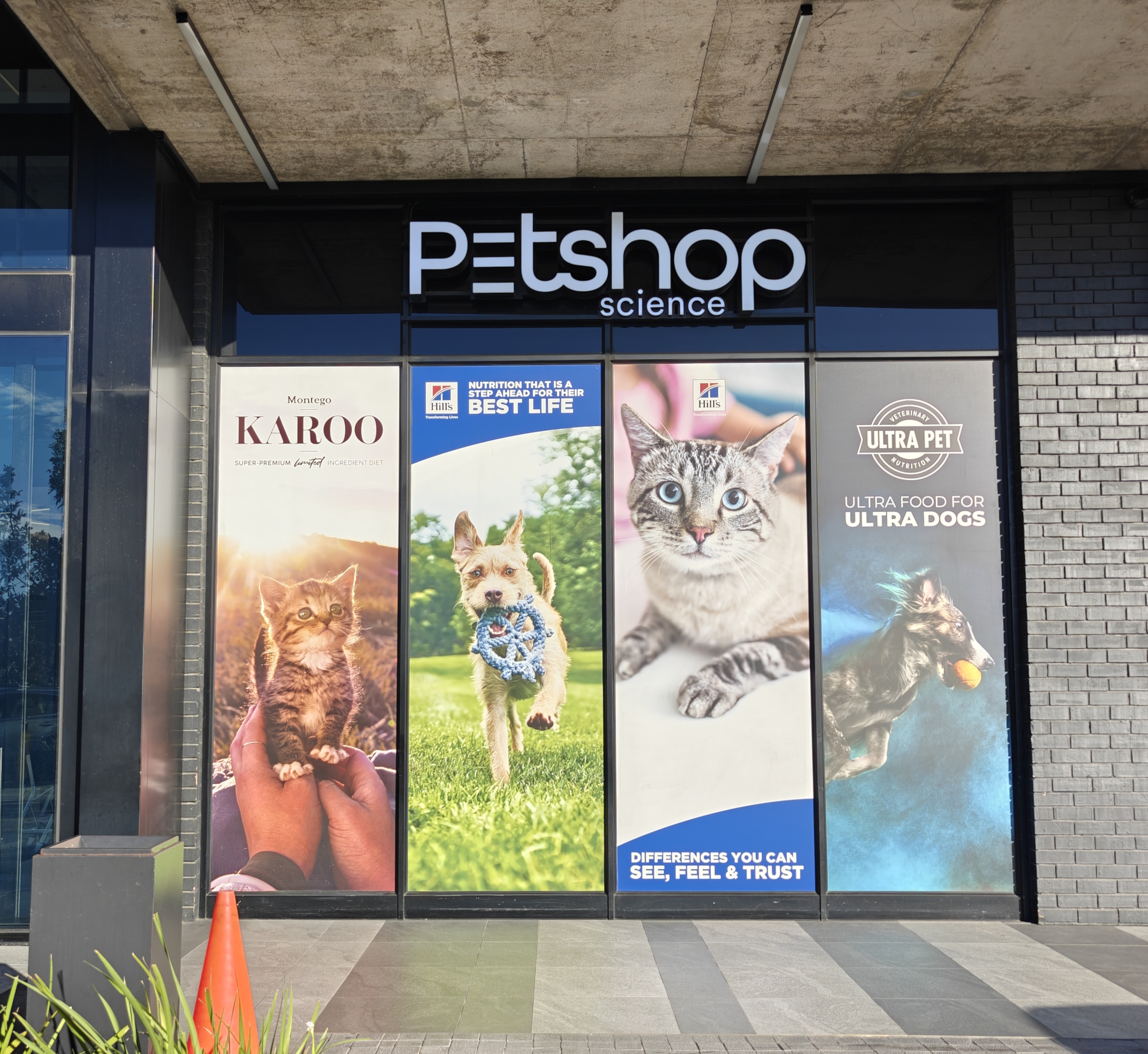
- Petshop Science store in Cape Town
- Type: Division
- Industry: Retail; Pet supplies
- Founded: 2021; 5 years ago
- Headquarters: City of Cape Town, South Africa
- Number of locations: 185 (2026)
- Area served: South Africa
- Products: Pet food Pet toys Pet insurance
- Brands: Sugacoat
- Owner: Checkers (Shoprite Holdings)
- Website: petshopscience.co.za

Petshop Science is a South African retail chain that sells pet-related products, as well as offers pet insurance. Founded in 2021, the company is headquartered in the City of Cape Town, and is a division of major South African retail corporation Checkers.

As of 2024, Petshop Science operates 185 locations across eight of the country's provinces, making it South Africa's second-largest pet store chain by number of stores, behind Woolworths-owned Absolute Pets.

== History ==
Petshop Science was founded in 2021, when major South African supermarket chain Checkers entered the pet store market. It was the first South African supermarket group to enter the pet store sector, after being the first such chain to offer pet insurance the year before.

In November 2024, the 100th Petshop Science store was opened, in Kempton Park, Gauteng.

In its 2024 financial year, the chain expanded rapidly, ending the year with 86 stores - double the number it started the year with.

In July 2025, Petshop Science partnered with UCount Rewards, the loyalty program of South African financial services company Standard Bank.

In its 2026 financial year, Petshop Science reported a 74.5% increase in sales, as the pet care industry in South Africa continued to grow.

== Operations ==
Petshop Science operates 185 pet stores across eight of South Africa's provinces, targeting mid-to-high income consumers, in a similar LSM bracket to Checkers' FreshX stores. Aside from third-party brands, stores sell a range of dog and cat grooming products under their Sugacoat house brand.

The company also offers pet insurance, underwritten by major South African insurer OUTsurance.

Petshop Science offers home delivery of around 3,500 products across 80 brands, via parent Checkers' Sixty60 app-based delivery service.

== See also ==
- Pets in South Africa
- Retailing in South Africa
