= Checkers (supermarket chain) =

Supermarket chain in Southern Africa

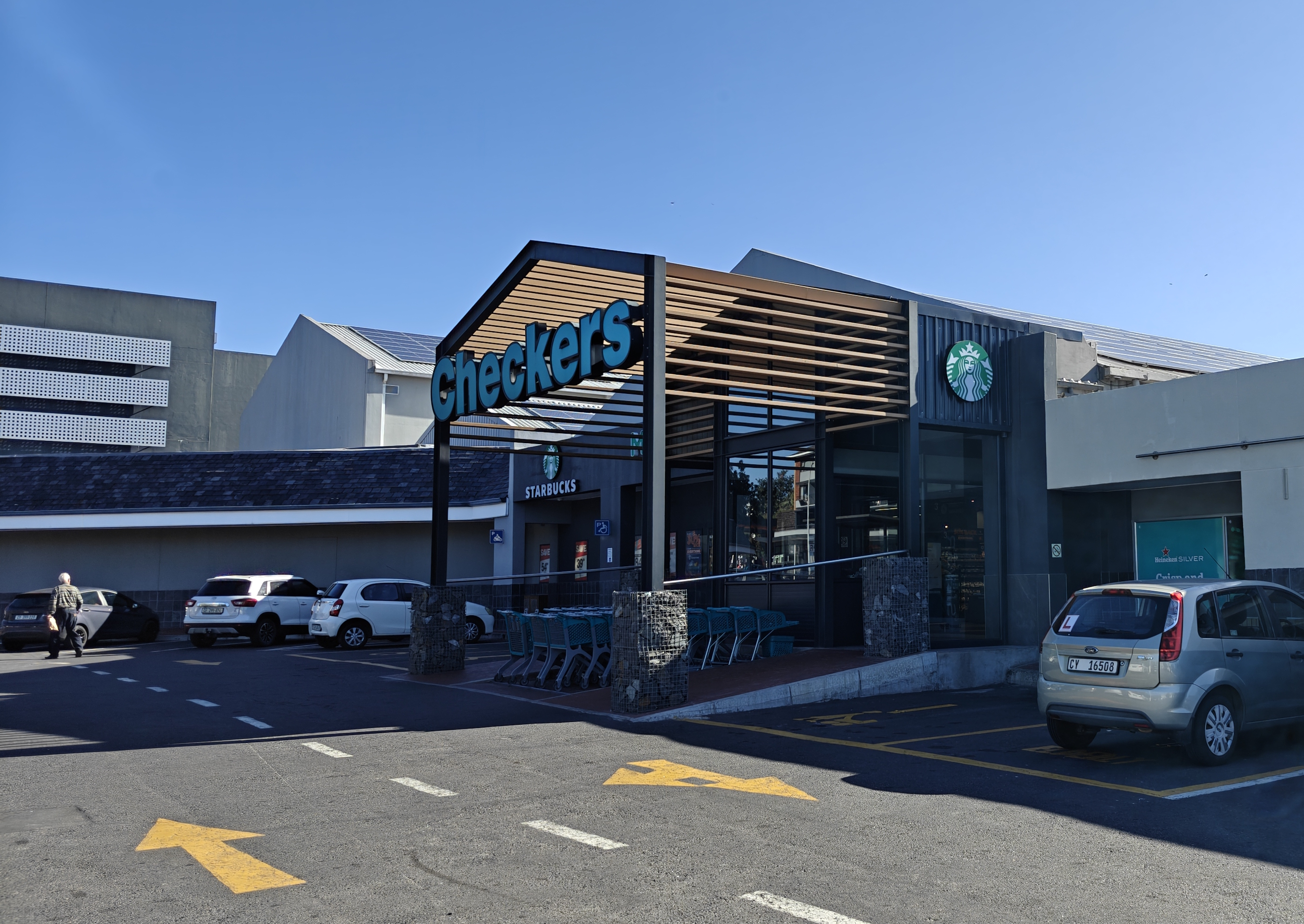
- A Checkers supermarket entrance in Durbanville, Western Cape
- Type: Subsidiary
- Industry: Retailing
- Founded: 1956; 70 years ago
- Founder: Norman Hertz Herber
- Headquarters: City of Cape Town, South Africa
- Number of locations: 786 across all formats (2026)
- Area served: South Africa; Botswana; Namibia
- Products: Groceries; Homeware; Cosmetics
- Services: Financial services
- Revenue: ▲ R105.2 billion (2026)
- Parent: Shoprite
- Divisions: Checkers Outdoor; Petshop Science; Uniq clothing by Checkers; Checkers Hyper; Checkers Liquor Shop littleme Sixty60; Checkers FreshX
- Website: www.checkers.co.za

Checkers is a South African supermarket retailer owned by sister retailer and discount chain Shoprite. Founded in 1956 by Norman Hertz Herber, the chain operates across Southern Africa.

In 2026, Checkers had 786 stores across South Africa, Botswana, and Namibia. The chain focuses on offering groceries to middle and high income consumers through its Checkers and FreshX store formats respectively.

The division has continued to launch new store types over recent years. These include Checkers Outdoor, UNIQ Clothing by Checkers, and Petshop Science. It also operates SA's largest on-demand grocery home delivery platform, Sixty60.

In the 2026 financial year, Checkers generated R105.2 billion, contributing approximately 38% towards total group revenue.

== History ==
Checkers was founded in 1956 by Norman Herber in Mayfair, Johannesburg. The firm was later expanded and made successful by Raymond Ackerman. The retailer launched its no-name items, called House Brands, in the 1950s, and by the 1960s, it had expanded to 85 stores across South Africa. Also in the 60s, Checkers became the first retail chain store to use high-density polyethylene bags.

In 1984, Checkers launched at-home shopping, via the South African Post Office, and the following year, the retailer launched its first card payment system in partnership with Barclays Bank.

In 1985, Checkers launched South Africa's first grocery delivery system, and in 1986, the company introduced an early version of product price scanning in its stores. Checkers launched the largest customer engagement drive by a South African retailer in 1990.

In 1991, Checkers was acquired by another South African retail chain – one of the country's largest at the time, Shoprite Group.

In 2016, Checkers launched its FreshX store format, with the explicit goal of competing directly with major South African retailer Woolworths, by targeting high income earners. The new store format, inspired in part by partner company IMS Argentina, was intended to be premium and interactive, including specialist departments such as a butchery, bakery, sushi bar, coffee bar, and wine cellar. Each department would have its own identity, and the FreshX layout and features would be radically different to existing Checkers stores.

FreshX stores would feature a specific ambiance, with seamless cork flooring for low shopping cart noise, more premium materials for interior decorating, a clutter-free environment, and wider aisles. The design of the new format has been outsourced to interior design companies, and these choices were made to create a more peaceful, relaxed shopping experience. The new FreshX format stores would sell a mix of in-house and private label brands. FreshX would also include partner brands, such as Kauai, Lindt, Krispy Kreme, and Starbucks, operating under a store-in-store model.

In 2019, Checkers Xtra Savings was launched as the company's loyalty program. Customers could earn rewards by registering for and swiping an Xtra Savings card, or scanning it on their phones.

In 2021, Checkers launched its first standalone pet store, under the Petshop Science brand. It was the first supermarket chain in South Africa to do so, and began rapidly expanding the brand across the country. In 2022, Checkers Outdoor was launched. The new brand would sell camping, outdoor recreation activity, and braai-related items. The following year, the company launched its Uniq clothing by Checkers brand, focused on women's fashion.

In 2021, Checkers launched a new small format store type called Checkers Foods. The new format was aimed at bringing Checkers closer to customers, with an expanded range of fresh food and premium convenience items. The first such store was opened in Weltevreden Park Shopping Center in Roodepoort, Gauteng, and was 1,200 sqm. Checkers said additional Checkers Foods stores would open in Westlake, Cape Town, and Franschhoek, Western Cape, as well as Ballito in KwaZulu-Natal, early in 2022.

The first Western Cape Checkers Foods store was launched in April 2022, in Franschhoek, with 1,000 sqm of retail space. Checkers said the store had a product offering tailored to its customers in that area. The store was named the top retail development at the SACSC 2022 Retail Design and Development Awards.

In 2024, Checkers extended its on-demand delivery to general merchandise. Previously, it had been the first grocery retailer in South Africa to launch an on-demand delivery service.

By December 2024, the retailer had launched a total of 12 Checkers Foods locations. In 2024, Checkers had a total of 12 million Xtra Savings loyalty card members. In the same financial year, the supermarket reported 12.3% sales growth for its core Checkers, Checkers Hyper, and Checkers Foods brands combined. In November 2024, the 100th Petshop Science store was opened.

In March 2025, Checkers was named South Africa’s strongest brand in the Brand Finance 2025 South Africa Top 100 Report, securing an AAA+ rating, the highest brand strength rating awarded. They then made retail history by unveiling South Africa’s first smart trolley, equipped with a range of technology designed to enhance the shopping experience, in August of that year.

In November 2025, Checkers stated its intent to continue to push into the upmarket retail segment in South Africa, by converting numerous existing stores into its premium FreshX format. The company said the conversions were one of its top priorities. Checkers reported that overall FreshX sales had increased by 13.8% year-over-year, contributing an additional R11.6 billion to the company's overall revenue. Also in 2025, the company launched its ecommerce site, which integrates the Sixty60 delivery platform.

In March 2026, Checkers reported that its on-demand delivery platform, Sixty60, was performing exceptionally well. While the company's overall grocery segment was growing, sales via the Sixty60 platform were increasing at significantly higher rates than in-store purchases. Shoprite Holdings' Supermarkets RSA merchandise sales grew 7.1% during the prior six months, while Sixty60 sales increased by 34.6% over the same period, growing to R11.9 billion. The number of stores where Sixty60 was available had increased by over 45% during the period December 2024 to December 2025.

In April 2026, Checkers announced that its Hyper (large format) stores would add a new store-in-store partner, coffee company Nespresso. With increasing competition in the South African retail sector, and a strong demand for coffee by SA consumers, the first Nespresso outlet opened inside the Checkers Hyper at Centurion Mall. The supermarket announced at the time that a second Nespresso store would open in May 2026, inside the Paarl Junction Hyper. Checkers said the Nespresso outlets would for the time being be limited to its Hyper stores, as they had space to accommodate them. Checkers also stated that the partnership fit its goal of bringing well-regarded global brands closer to consumers through its stores.

In May 2026, it was reported that Checkers' parent company Shoprite had four so-called "dark stores", to exclusively serve its on-demand Sixty60 home delivery service. These stores serve as micro fulfilment centers, increasing delivery fulfilment times in high-demand areas, and are not accessible to the public like traditional stores are. Three of them were in Cape Town, and one in Joburg. The company confirmed it was busy constructing the first such store in KZN. At the time, Shoprite confirmed that Sixty60 deliveries were fulfilled from a total of 894 stores across SA.

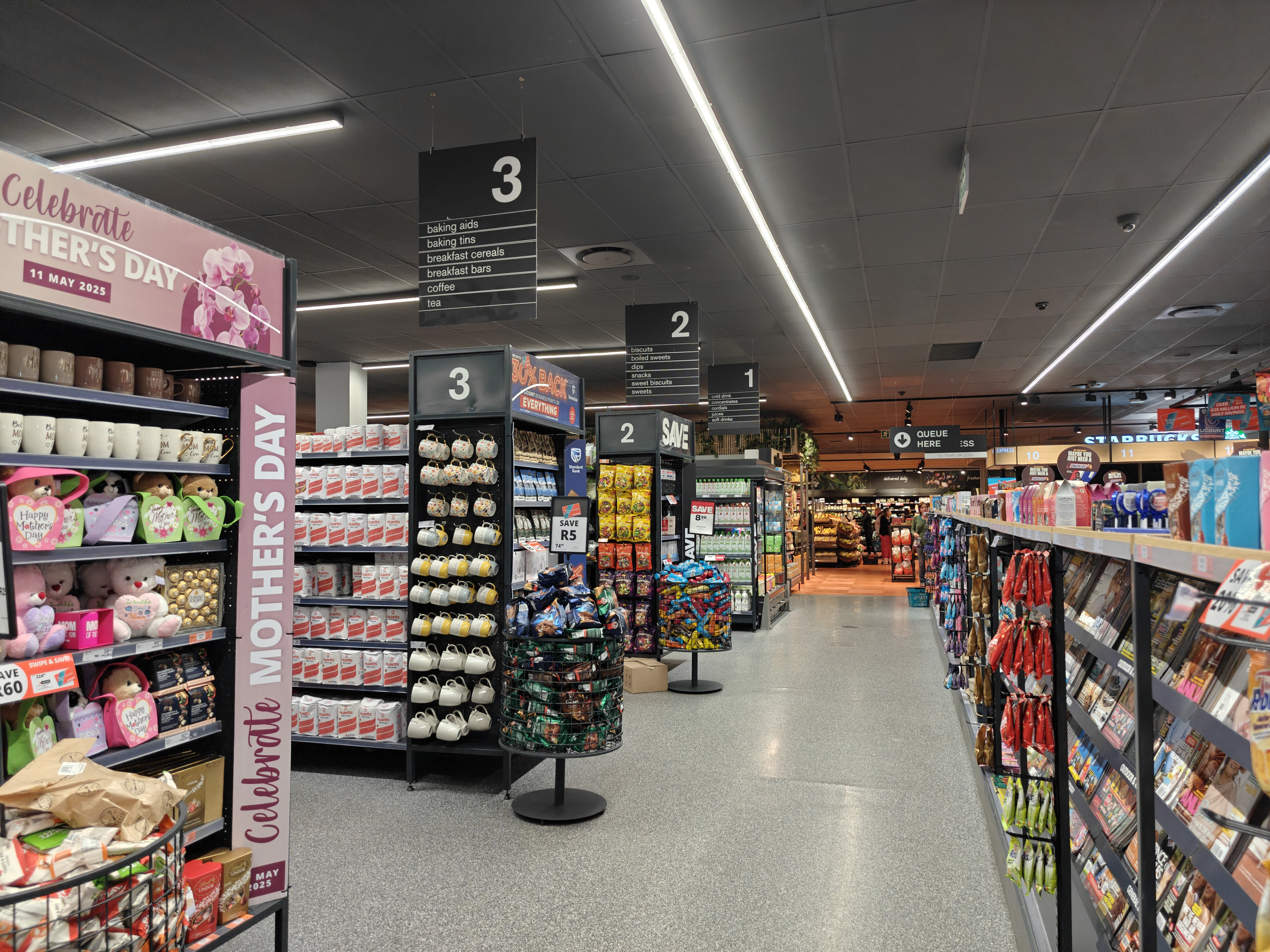
Grocery aisles in a Checkers supermarket

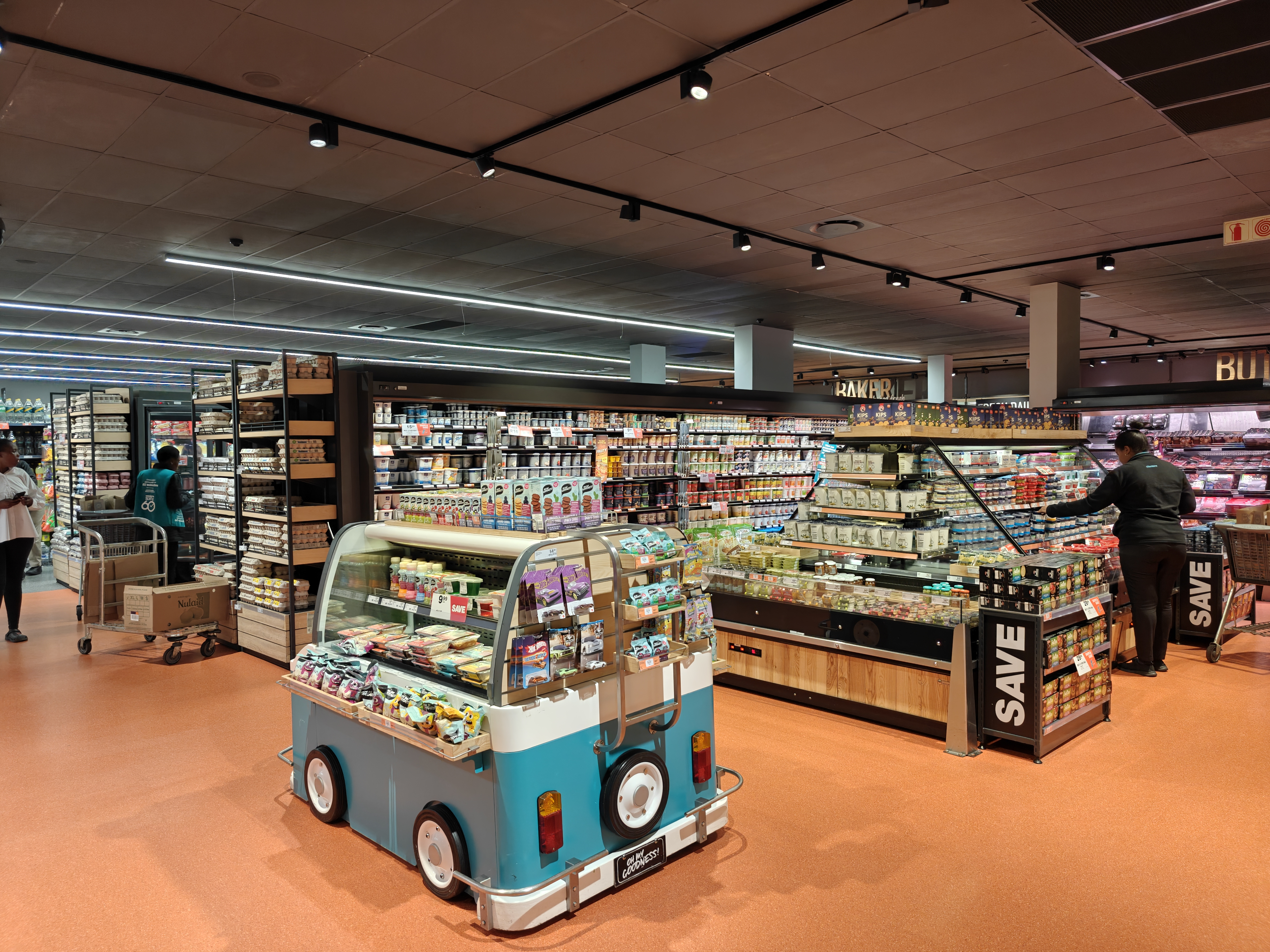
Dairy aisle in a Cape Town Checkers store

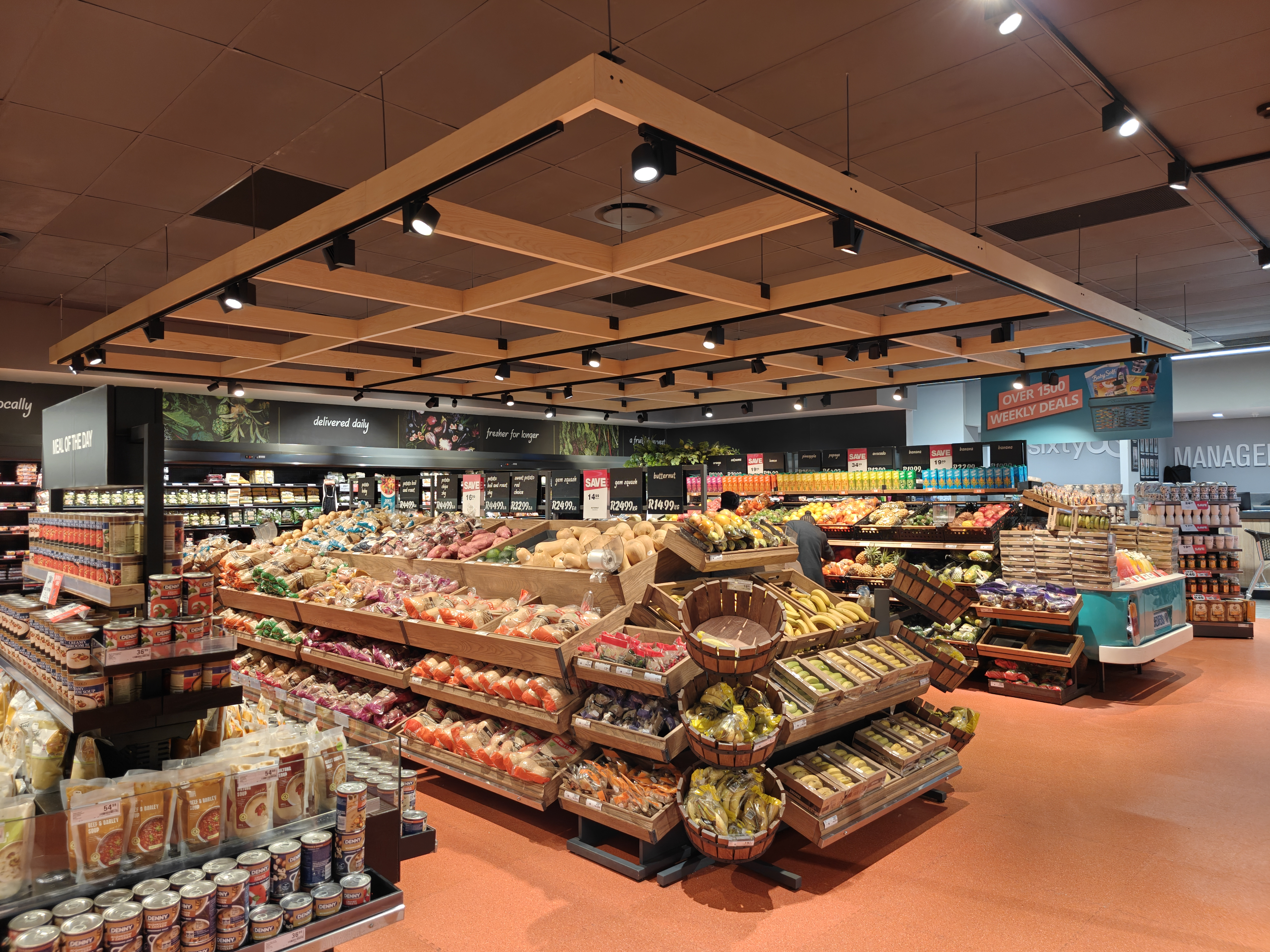
A Checkers fresh produce section

In October 2026, it was reported that the launch of a new Checkers children's toy store format was being considered. One of multiple new concepts under consideration, the first of these new stores would potentially open before the end of 2026.

== Operations ==
In 2025, Checkers had 786 stores across three countries. This total included 363 supermarkets, 44 Checkers Hyper stores, and 379 Checkers Liquor Shops.

As of 2026, the company operates 185 pet stores under its Petshop Science brand, making it the second-largest pet store retailer in South Africa, behind Woolworths' Absolute Pets brand.

The company's store formats are:

- Checkers - standard size supermarkets
- Checkers FreshX - standard size supermarkets targeting the premium grocery sector (high income earners)
- Checkers Hyper - large size stores with a wider range than the supermarkets, including homeware and clothing
- Uniq Clothing by Checkers
- Checkers Liquor Shop - alcohol stores positioned separately to supermarkets, as per South African legislation
- littleme - baby products
- Checkers Outdoor - outdoor goods
- Petshop Science - pet-related products

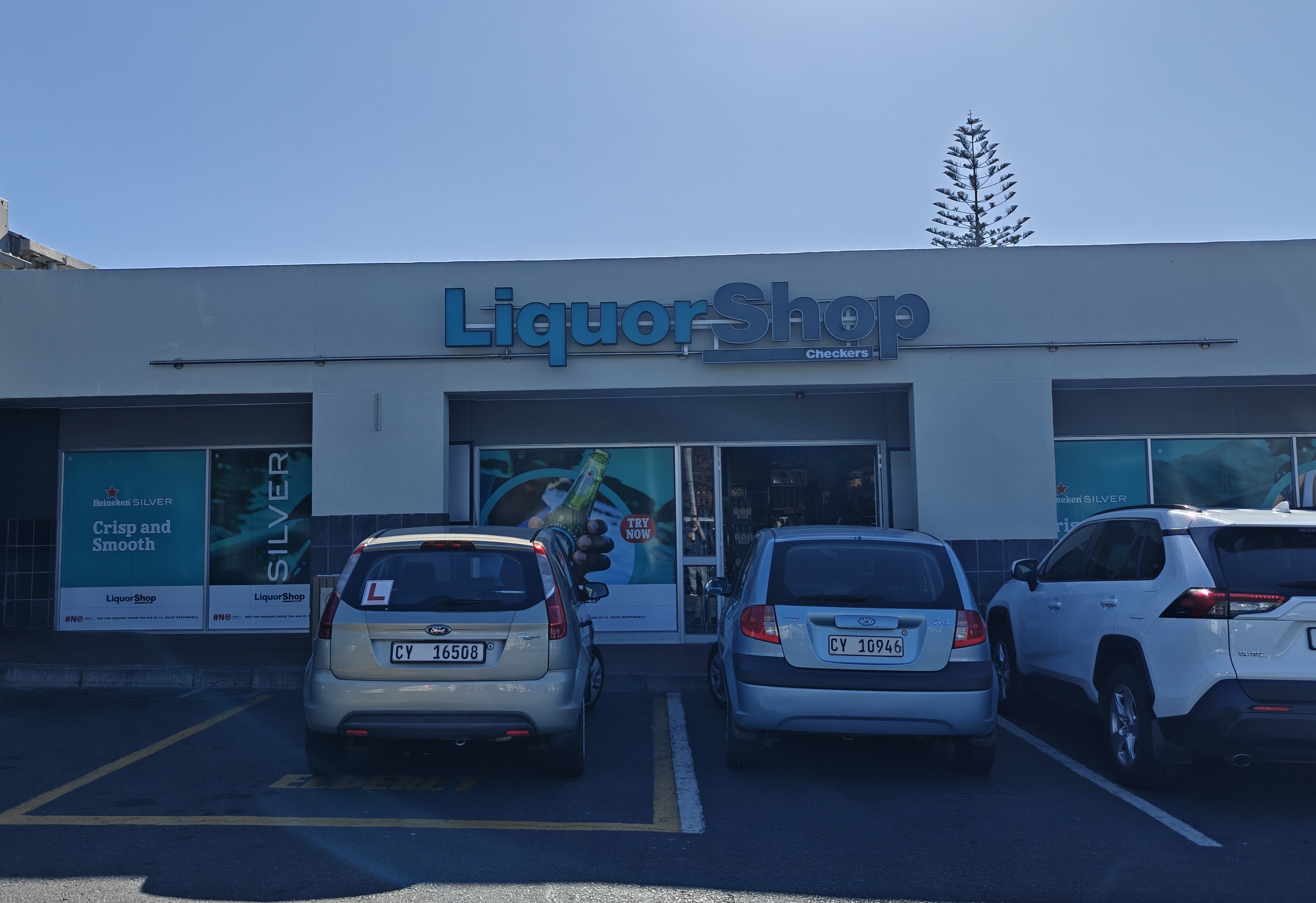
Checkers Liquor Shop entrance in Durbanville

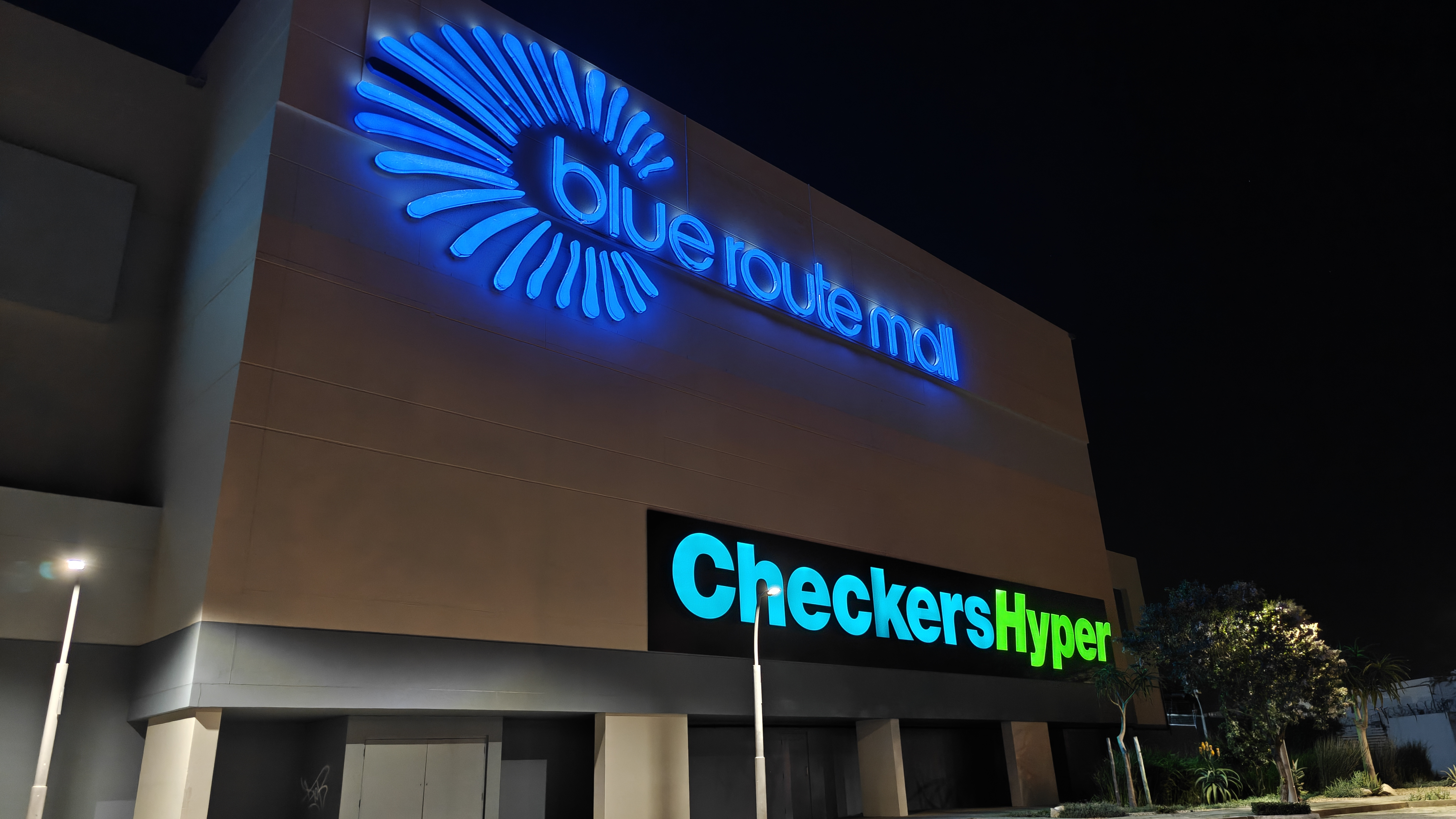
Checkers Hyper signage at Blue Route Mall in Tokai, Cape Town

== Sixty60 ==
In November 2019, Checkers launched its home delivery system, called Sixty60. The on-demand, app-based service was the first supermarket delivery service in South Africa that provided a 1-hour delivery window.

In October 2024, Checkers significantly expanded the delivery service’s catalogue to include 10,000 general merchandise items, and then in November of the same year, added 2,500 "premium products" for delivery exclusively in Cape Town. As of December 2024, the Sixty60's on-demand delivery service was available from 601 locations, with the retailer adding 96 new sites in 2024.

In March 2025, the retailer further developed Sixty60 by developing a browser-based option for customers to use. Around the same time, it was announced that the delivery platform would expand within sister retailer Shoprite's operations, from the existing 3 branches, to a total of 5, across 3 South African provinces.

In the same month, it was reported that 60Sixty had become the dominant supermarket delivery service in South Africa. The service saw a 110% growth in 2024 alone. It also recorded a 1.3-times increase in the average frequency of customers placing orders through the platform. Shoprite (Checkers' parent company) noted that Sixty60 had created nearly 14,200 new employment opportunities since its launch.

In March 2026, it was reported that Checkers had expanded Sixty60 to 875 stores across South Africa and Checkers Sixty60 drivers reportedly earned over R160 million in tips in the second half of 2025 alone.

== Loyalty program ==
Checkers customers can use their Xtra Savings loyalty card to access program-specific discounts. Cards can be obtained online or in store.

In 2016 Checkers tested the Xtra Savings loyalty card, and subsequently shelved it until its launch in late 2019. This program allows customers to sign-up for a card which they will then need to swipe with each purchase. Unlike other rewards programs, customers are rewarded with instant savings on purchases instead of points to spend later.

Checkers claims that use of the card could result in up to 25% savings and early access to certain sales. There are some public questions about whether the savings are real. This is because discounted prices have been compared with other shop's normal prices. These comparisons seem to indicate that Checkers advertised savings have been exaggerated.

In August 2024, major South African medical aid (health insurance) provider and financial institution, Discovery, partnered with Checkers to offer its Discovery Vitality rewards program members a HealthyFood benefit from certain items sold at Checkers.

In April 2025, Checkers partnered with major South African financial institution, Standard Bank, and the bank's customers can earn Standard Bank uCount rewards points by shopping at Checkers.

Customers can also sign up for an Xtra Savings Plus monthly subscription, for extra rewards, and unlimited Sixty60 deliveries (provided a minimum order spend is met).

== Corporate social responsibility ==
In 2013, Checkers introduced the first 100% recycled plastic shopping bags in South Africa.

== Controversy ==
In November 2025, major South African news outlets began publishing articles calling out Checkers' Sixty60 delivery drivers for their hazardous driving behavior. News desks noted Sixty60's rating of 1.53 out of 5, on South African consumer feedback website HelloPeter. While other supermarket delivery services are also known for reckless driving, Checkers' drivers have been particularly in focus for their not paying attention while on the road.

At the time, Hein Jonker, founder of the Motorcycle Safety Institute of South Africa, stated that delivery drivers' actions affect not only them, but motorists around them, and that supermarket delivery drivers should undergo professional rider training. Jonker further stated that groups employing or contracting delivery drivers should assess driving behaviors, and then implement consistent measures to penalize reckless driving, and reward good driving. Finally, Jonker said traffic authorities should be more involved in policing delivery driver behavior. There have also been requests from consumers for Checkers to intervene and bring about improvements to Sixty60.

In response, Sixty60 partnered with the Motorcycle Safety Institute of South Africa to provide customised urban rider courses. In addition, drivers receive comprehensive onboardings which include safety protocols and accident procedures, defensive driving training, and anti-hijacking training. Drivers also receive annual refresher training for these topics. Support is provided to drivers in-field teams, regional training workshops and a central support team that ensures the continued safety of the drivers and other motorists.

== See also ==
- Retailing in South Africa
