= Kennel Union of Southern Africa =

Official kennel club of South Africa

- Abbreviation: KUSA
- Predecessor: South African Kennel Club; South African Kennel Union
- Formation: 1891; 135 years ago
- Type: Nonprofit kennel club
- Registration no.: 9072/930/16/8
- Legal status: Public benefit organization (PBO)
- Headquarters: Cape Town, South Africa
- Region served: South Africa
- Services: Dog breed standards
- Official language: English
- Chairperson: Michael Alberts
- Vice-Chairperson: Yvonne Jeffries
- Publication: The Kennel Union Journal
- Affiliations: Fédération Cynologique Internationale; American Kennel Club; Royal Kennel Club
- Revenue: ▼ R7.62 million (2024)
- Expenses: ▲ R8.06 million (2024)
- Funding: Registrations; Memberships
- Staff: 14 (2026)
- Website: kusa.co.za

The Kennel Union of Southern Africa (KUSA) is the official kennel club of South Africa. Founded in 1891, KUSA is a registered nonprofit, and is headquartered in Cape Town.

KUSA is registered with the Department of Agriculture as a dog breeders' society, and as the registering authority for 218 dog breeds.

== History ==
The club was founded as the South African Kennel Club in 1891, when the Southern African Kennel Club of Port Elizabeth formed an affiliation with the South African Kennel Club of Cape Town.

The first documented dog show in South Africa took place in 1883 at the Albany Agricultural Show. The Port Elizabeth club was founded a week later, and the Cape Town club was founded in 1889. The Transvaal kennel club joined in 1894 and at a meeting in 1895 the kennel clubs of Cradock, East London and Grahamstown joined, Natal joined in 1899 and the Free State in 1905.

In 1920, the club reorganised and changed its name to the South African Kennel Union, with the affiliation of the kennel clubs of Rhodesia and South West Africa in 1964 the club adopted its present name, the Kennel Union of Southern Africa.

Initially, the club maintained very close links with The Kennel Club of the United Kingdom, adopting their breed standards and conformation judging formats, although for dog breeds not recognised by that club they used the standards of the Fédération Cynologique Internationale.

In 1993, the club became a full member of the Fédération Cynologique Internationale.

== Objectives ==
KUSA's main stated objectives include:

- To maintain classifications of recognized breeds of dogs, and to approve breed standards
- To promote breed health and to encourage the responsible not-for-profit breeding and showing of purebred dogs
- To register pure bred dogs and issue pedigrees
- To promote the improvement and general wellbeing of dogs through KUSA's Code of Ethics
- To approve, and register dog-related associations and other organizations
- To regulate the holding of training classes, and all events forming part of the Schedules of KUSA's Constitution

== Legislation ==
KUSA is registered in accordance with the Animal Improvement Act, 62 of 1998. The organization operates in accordance with its Constitution. It is managed by a Federal Council, led by a Chairperson, and assisted by a Vice-Chair. KUSA also operates Provincial Councils, each of which maintain a Chairperson and Secretary.
