= Statistics South Africa =

South African national statistical office

Agency overview
- Preceding agencies: Central Statistical Service; Statistics Branch (Bophuthatswana); Central Statistical Service (Ciskei); Central Statistics Office (Transkei); Statistics Division (Venda)
- Jurisdiction: Government of South Africa
- Headquarters: Isibalo House, 1 Koch Street Salvokop, Pretoria, Gauteng, South Africa; 25°45′38″S 28°11′16″E
- Employees: 2,614 (2009/10)
- Annual budget: R1.97 billion (2010/11)
- Minister responsible: Mondli Gungubele, Minister in the Presidency for the National Planning Commission
- Agency executive: Risenga Maluleke, Statistician-General
- Key document: Statistics Act, 1999
- Website: statssa.gov.za

Statistics South Africa (officially the Department of Statistics South Africa, and often shortened to Stats SA) is the national statistical service of South Africa. The Department has the goal of producing timely, accurate and official statistics to advance economic growth, development and democracy.

Statistics South Africa produces official demographic, economic and social censuses and surveys. To date Statistics South Africa has produced four censuses, in 1996, 2001, 2011 and 2022.

Statistics South Africa was previously known as the "Central Statistical Service", shortly after the end of apartheid and absorbed the statistical services of the former Transkei, Bophuthatswana, Venda and Ciskei.

== Regular publications ==
As of 2026, the agency publishes a variety of recurring reports, including:

- Residential Property Price Index (RPPI)
- Consumer Price Index (CPI)
- Construction Materials Price Indices
- Financial statistics of higher education institutions
- Financial statistics of national government
- Financial statistics of provincial government
- Motor trade sales
- Producer Price Index
- Retail trade sales
- Wholesale trade sales
- Annual Financial Statistics (AFS)
- Electricity generated and available for distribution
- Gross Domestic Product (GDP)
- Manufacturing: Production and sales
- Mining: Production and sales
- Quarterly Employment Statistics (QES)
- Quarterly Labour Force Survey (QLFS)
- Tourism and migration
- Tourist accommodation
- Mid-year population estimates
- General Household Survey (GHS)

== Surveys conducted ==
- 1999 Survey of Activities of Young People, or the SAYP.
- South African National Census of 2001
- 2007 Community Survey
- South African National Census of 2011
- South African National Census of 2022
