= General Household Survey (South Africa) =

National survey of South African households

The General Household Survey (GHS) is an annual national survey of South African households conducted by Stats SA since 2002. It collects information on household living conditions, access to public services, and socioeconomic development across the country's nine provinces.

Information collected from participating households is confidential, and used for statistical purposes. The disclosure of identifiable information is restricted under the Statistics Act, 1999, which establishes confidentiality protections for information collected by Stats SA.

== History ==
The General Household Survey (GHS) was introduced by Statistics South Africa in 2002, succeeding the October Household Survey (OHS), which had been conducted annually from 1993 to 1999. The earlier survey had covered both labor market conditions and household living standards. Following its discontinuation, these functions were divided between the Labour Force Survey and the GHS, with the latter focusing on socioeconomic conditions, public services, and household living conditions.

In 2008, Stats SA began a major revision of the survey, updating its questionnaire following consultations with stakeholders. The revised questionnaire was introduced during the 2009 survey. Historical data collected between 2002 and 2007 were also reweighted to reflect updated demographic estimates and changes to provincial boundaries.

== Purpose ==
The GHS' findings are used to monitor development trends, evaluate the performance of public programs, and assess the quality of service delivery to households. The survey provides national, provincial, and metropolitan-level indicators that allow government departments to assess changes in living conditions, identify gaps in public service provision, and monitor the effectiveness of policies and development initiatives.

By collecting comparable information annually, the GHS enables researchers and policymakers to examine long-term socioeconomic trends and differences between geographical areas and population groups.

Government departments also use the survey to evaluate specific public programs. For example, the Department of Basic Education uses GHS data to monitor school enrolment and other education indicators. The findings support education planning and assessments of access to educational services across different demographic and socioeconomic groups.

== Methodology ==
The survey covers six broad areas, namely education, health and social development, food, housing, access to services and facilities, and agriculture.

The General Household Survey uses a stratified, two-stage probability sampling methodology to collect data from a representative sample of South African households. The survey covers private households across all nine provinces, but excludes people living in certain institutions, such as military barracks, and student residences.

Households are selected using a master sampling frame developed by Stats SA. In the first stage, geographic areas are selected with probabilities proportional to their population size. In the second stage, individual dwelling units are systematically selected within those areas. The sampling design allows for the production of estimates at national, provincial, and metropolitan levels.

The collected data are weighted to account for differences in selection probabilities, non-response, and population characteristics. These weights are calibrated against official population estimates, allowing findings from the sampled households to be extrapolated to the broader South African population.

== Survey process ==
Information collected from participating households is confidential, used for statistical purposes, and governed by the Statistics Act, 1999.

Not all households are surveyed every year. Stats SA uses a representative sample for the GHS, rather than a full population census. Households are scientifically selected to participate and cannot be substituted with other households. Data collection takes place throughout the year, with selected households potentially contacted during any month. Follow-up interviews are conducted in subsequent years to track changes in household circumstances over a five-year period.

Survey officers contact selected households to administer a standardized questionnaire covering household composition, living conditions, access to services, and other socioeconomic indicators. Since 2019, the survey has primarily used computer-assisted personal interviewing (CAPI), in which responses are recorded electronically during interviews.

The questionnaire is periodically revised to accommodate changing information requirements and government priorities. Depending on the information required, questions may be added, modified, or removed. Responses are subsequently processed and weighted to produce statistical estimates, which are published in annual reports and accompanying datasets.

== See also ==
- Statistics South Africa
- Housing in South Africa
