= Absolute Pets =

South African retail company

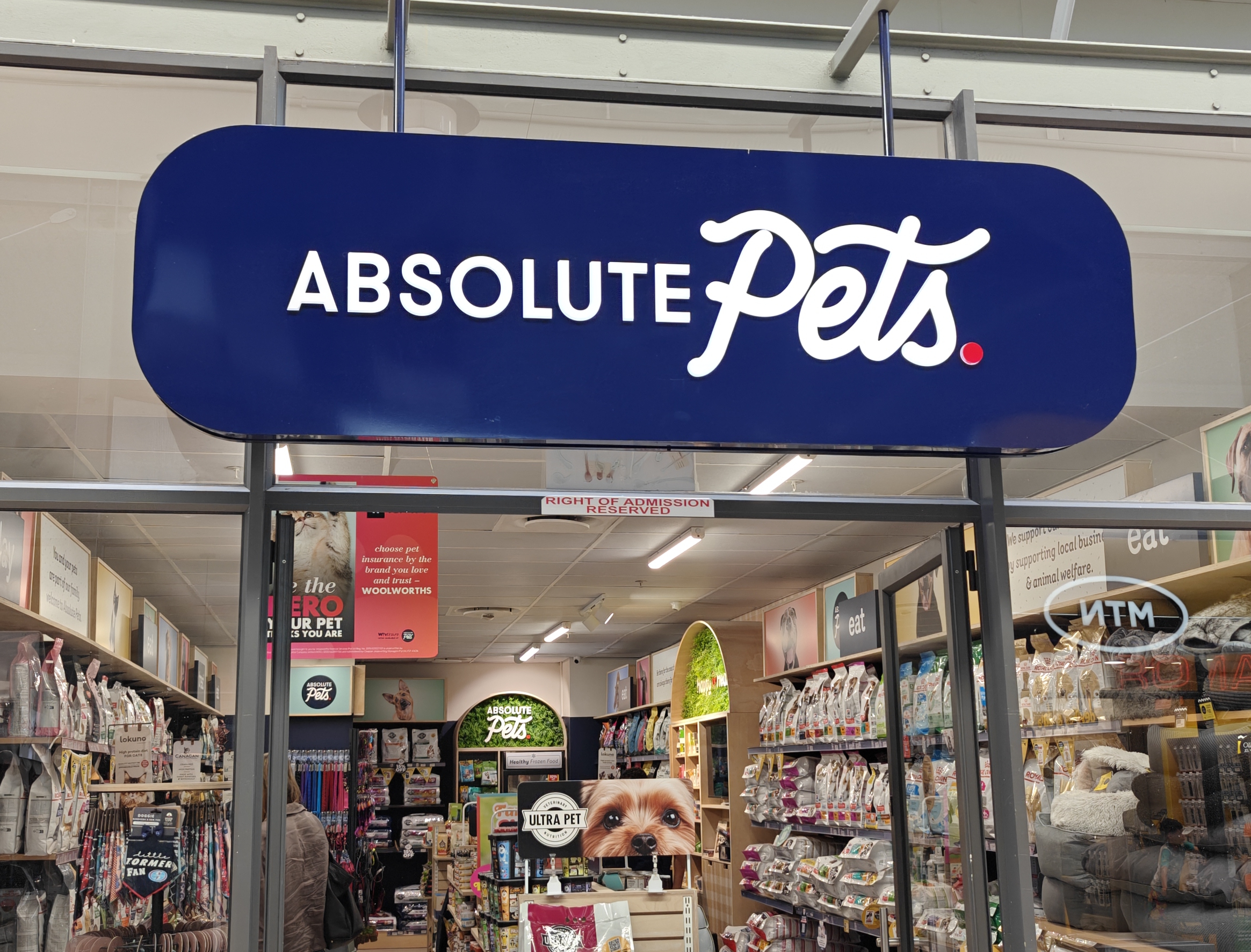
- Absolute Pets store in The Paddocks shopping center, in Milnerton, Cape Town
- Type: Subsidiary
- Industry: Retail; Pet supplies
- Founded: 2005; 21 years ago
- Headquarters: Cape Town, South Africa
- Number of locations: 200+ (2026)
- Area served: South Africa
- Key people: Richard Goldstein and Oliver Power [Founders] Stephen Warner (CEO)
- Products: Pet food Pet toys
- Services: Pet grooming
- Owner: Woolworths (93.45%)
- Website: absolutepets.com

Absolute Pets is a South African retail chain that sells pet-related products, as well as provides grooming services at certain locations. Founded in 2005, the company is headquartered in Cape Town and is a majority-owned subsidiary of major South African retail corporation Woolworths.

As of 2026, Absolute Pets operates over 200 locations across the country and continues to expand. The company is South Africa's largest pet store chain by number of stores. Most stores are located in the country's three largest metros – Cape Town, Durban, and Johannesburg.

== History ==
Absolute Pets was founded in 2005 by Valarie Mentz. In 2009, Richard Goldstein (Boomer Beach Bats) and Oliver Power (Strika Entertainment) acquired five stores and the Absolute Pets name from Mentz. They set out to created what is regarded as South Africa's first branded pet-store chain. They established a consistent brand identity and store format, developed training systems and introduced label products. They developed an omnichannel retail model connecting the company's physical stores with online sales, making Absolute Pets one of the first specialist pet retailers in South Africa to combine the two channels. It became South Africa's largest retailer of pet-related supplies.

In late 2023, major South African retail company Woolworths announced its intention to purchase a 93.45% stake in Absolute Pets from Sanlam Private Equity and the company's management. The remaining 6.55% shareholding would be acquired by Woolworths over an agreed period, under a put-and-call arrangement. Woolworths bought 150 stores for R609 million in cash. The existing Absolute Pets management team remained in their roles.

The acquisition became effective on 1 April 2024, following approval from the South African Competition Tribunal. In addition to WPet, Woolworths' existing pet care business, Absolute Pets became part of Woolworths Ventures, a newly created internal unit.

At the time, Woolworths said that Absolute Pets was strategically aligned with its existing business. The retailer also said that pet care was an attractive, rapidly developing market with substantial growth potential. Woolworths estimated the South African pet care sector to be worth over R7 billion, comprising approximately 21.7 million pets.

== Operations ==
Absolute Pets operates 196 pet stores across South Africa, which equates to around 12% of the total number of stores in the Woolworths group. The stores collectively cover over 15,000 square meters of retail space. Aside from pet-related products, certain locations also offer dog and cat grooming services.

Absolute Pets stores target mid-to-high income earners, aligning with the customer base of Woolworths' other store brands.

Through its Absolute Pets app, the company offers "Go Fetch!", a delivery service that fulfills orders in under 60 minutes for customers located within 5 km of one of its stores.

== See also ==
- Pets in South Africa
- Retailing in South Africa
