= Retailing in South Africa =

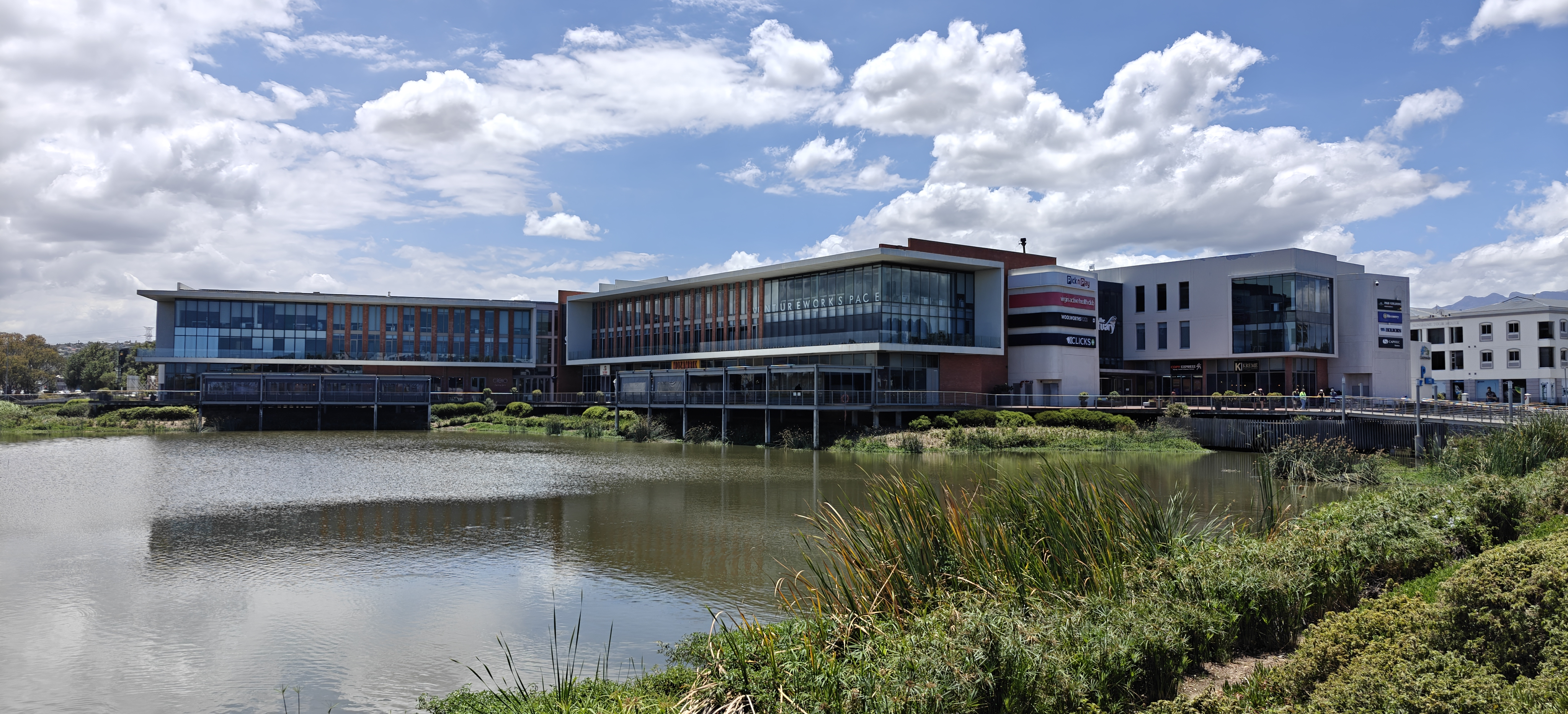
The Sanctuary Shopping Centre in Somerset West, Western Cape

Retailing in South Africa is a large, diverse market sector, comprising myriad businesses, ranging in size from independent traders to multinational corporations. In 2024, the retail sector grew for the fourth consecutive year, to reach a value of approximately R1.36 trillion. The year prior, retail was the second-largest employment sector in South Africa, and contributed around 20% towards the country's GDP.

== Economic contribution ==
South Africa's retail sector is the largest on the African continent. The sector contributes a significant amount towards South Africa's economy.

The country's formal independent retail and wholesale sector is valued at R268 billion as of 2025, comprising nearly a third of the SA's fast-moving consumer goods (FMCG) market.

The South African Government has implemented tax reforms to support the local retail sector. For example, the South African Revenue Service introduced stricter rules for cross-border e-commerce platforms such as Shein and Temu, raising import duties and value added tax to curb foreign competition. These regulations include increased customs duties and import VAT, aimed at protecting local retailers and generating government revenue. Customs duties are determined by the type, value, and origin of imported goods.

The South African retail industry was predicted to grow at a compound annual growth rate (CAGR) of over 4% through 2027.

Below are alphabetized lists of the major retailers in South Africa by product category. Revenue is in South African rand. For foreign-domicilied companies, the year of foundation is the year of launch in South Africa. Only columns that are complete are totaled.

== Loyalty programs ==
Various customer loyalty programs run in-house by South Africa's major retailers are highly popular amongst local shoppers. Loyalty cards have been an integrated part of shopping both in physical stores and online, for many years. Some cards offer benefits across partner loyalty programs from multiple major companies, such as between certain supermarket chains, gas stations, and commercial banks. Consumer research from 2026 found at least 23 large, active loyalty programs in SA.

Card usage varied by region in SA, with the range of total cards held by consumers going from four to nine, with an average of seven to eight. Interestingly, the number of loyalty cards per customer increased as household income increased.

In that research, it was found that grocery loyalty programs were the most popular, with shoppers found to be more loyal towards the programs than the brands they were buying. The card ranked as most valuable was Shoprite Group's Xtra Savings card.

=== Sectors ===
The table below shows loyalty card usage by sector, as well as popular cards within those sectors, according to the research.

Loyalty card usage across sectors in South Africa (as at April 2026)
Sector	Usage	Most used card/s
Groceries	96%	Shoprite Xtra Savings, Checkers Xtra Savings, and Pick n Pay Smart Shopper
Banking	73%	Capitec Live Better, FNB eBucks, Discovery Vitality, and Absa Rewards
Pharmacies	66%	Clicks ClubCard
Clothing and decor	63%	TFG Rewards
Mobile networks	61%	Vodacom Vodabucks
Gas stations	43%	Shell V+, Sasol Rewards, and Total Rewards

== Online ==
Online shopping has become more common, as the internet in South Africa has become more accessible. The country has 50.8 million internet users, constituting 78.9% of the population, as of January 2025.

In 2024, e-commerce was predicted to grow at an annual rate of 15 to 20%, driven by an increase in internet accessibility and increased use of digital payment methods. In the same year, e-commerce accounted for 10.5% of total retail sales in SA. This was estimated to reach 20% by 2027. This growth is also supported by advancements in online platforms and alternative payment options like Float.

Originally, the largest e-commerce store in South Africa was Kalahari.com. Kalahari merged with Takealot in 2015, and the new company has become the e-commerce sales leader in the South African market. Takealot owns online fashion store Superbalist, which it acquired along with delivery service Mr Delivery (now branded MrD) in 2014. US-based Amazon only launched in SA in 2024, and still has a small presence. Many brick and mortar retailers also sell their goods online.

E-commerce stores in South Africa
Company	Founded	Headquarters	Revenue	Ref
Amazon	2024; 2 years ago	Cape Town		
Takealot	2011; 15 years ago	Cape Town	R16.4 billion (2026)	
Total				

== Coffeehouses ==
South Africa has many independent coffeehouses. There are also five major coffeehouse chains, the majority of which are headquartered in Cape Town, which has a significant coffee culture.

Coffeehouse chains in South Africa
Company	Founded	Headquarters	Number of locations	Revenue	Ref
Bootlegger	2013; 13 years ago	Cape Town	120+ (2026)		
Platō Coffee	2019; 7 years ago	Pretoria	150 (2026)		
Seattle	1993; 33 years ago	Cape Town	297 (2025)		
Vida	2001; 25 years ago	Cape Town	400 (2026)		
WCafe		Cape Town	~230 (2026)		
Total			1,207+		

== Supermarkets ==
South Africa is home to numerous large supermarket chains. Some, like Spar and Food Lover's Market, focus on groceries. Others, like Pick n Pay, offer standalone clothing stores. Woolworths is the only chain to also operate department style stores. It also owns Absolute Pets chain of pet stores - South Africa's largest. The Shoprite Group, which owns Checkers and USave, is South Africa's largest private sector employer, with around 170,000 employees as of 2026. Checkers operates midmarket grocery stores, FreshX upmarket grocery stores, Uniq clothing stores, Petshop Science pet stores, and Checkers Outdoor stores.

In April 2026, South African food manufacturer Libstar estimated that the country's collective grocery chain store trade alone was worth R513 billion a year, with a further R170 billion a year attributed to small-scale, independent grocery trade.

Supermarket chains in South Africa
Company	Founded	Headquarters	Number of locations	Type	Revenue	Ref
Boxer	1977; 49 years ago	Westville	500 (2024)	Lower market to midmarket		
Bargain Group	1954; 72 years ago	Port Shepstone	9 (2025)	Lower market to midmarket		
Checkers	1956; 70 years ago	Brackenfell	597 (2025)	Midmarket to upmarket	R97.31 billion (2024)	
Food Lover's Market	1993; 33 years ago	Brackenfell	120+ (2025)	Midmarket to upmarket		
Pick n Pay	1967; 59 years ago	Cape Town	2,279 (2024)	Midmarket to upmarket	R20.12 billion (2024)	
Shoprite	1979; 47 years ago	Brackenfell	3,478 (2025)	Midmarket	R256 billion (2025)	
Spar	1963; 63 years ago	uMhlanga	3,726 (2024)	Midmarket to upmarket	R131.46 billion (2025)	
USave	2003; 23 years ago	Brackenfell	500 (2025)	Lower market to midmarket		
Woolworths	1931; 95 years ago	Cape Town	1,669 (2026)	Upmarket	R82.77 billion (2026)	
Total			12,878+			

== Pet stores ==
The South African pet sector is estimated, as of mid-2026, to be worth approximately R10.4 billion, and to have an annual growth rate of over 15%.

Aside from independent pet stores, there are five major pet store chains in South Africa, many of which are relatively new in the context of South African retail chains, with two being significantly larger than the others. Four of the chains are owned by major SA supermarket groups. Absolute Pets (the largest chain by number of stores) is owned by Woolworths, while Petshop Science is owned by Checkers, Pet Storey is owned by SPAR, and VetsMart is partnered with Food Lover's Market.

Pet stores chains of South Africa
Company	Parent company	Founded	Headquarters	Number of locations *	Ref
Absolute Pets	Woolworths	2005; 21 years ago	Cape Town	200+ (2026)	
Petshop Science	Checkers	2021; 5 years ago	Brackenfell	173 (2026)	
Pet Storey	SPAR	2025; 1 year ago	Pinetown	22 (2026)	
VetsMart	Food Lover's Market	2004; 22 years ago	Cape Town	12 (2026)	
Petworld	Petworld Africa Holding	2014; 12 years ago	Cape Town	9 (2026)	
Total	–	–	–	416+	

* Including countries of operation outside of South Africa

== Petrol stations & convenience stores ==
South Africa is home to numerous convenience store brands, most of which are located at petrol stations, either via an in-house brand, or a co-location partnership with a major local retail company.

Part of a thriving automotive industry in South Africa, as of 2025, there around 4,000 petrol stations across the country, operated by seven different brands. The two largest petrol station chains by number of locations are headquartered in Cape Town, while the rest have their head offices in the City of Johannesburg.

In June 2026, the Fuel Retailers Association (FRA) reported that 46% of consumers visit forecourts for reasons other than to buy fuel.

Petrol stations & convenience stores in South Africa
Company	Founded	Headquarters	Revenue	Convenience store partner	Headquarters	Number of locations *	Ref
Astron	1911; 115 years ago	Cape Town		FreshStop (owned by Food Lover's Market)	Cape Town	850 (2025)	
BP	1924; 102 years ago	Johannesburg		Pick n Pay Express	Cape Town	500 (2025)	
Engen	1881; 145 years ago	Cape Town	R156 billion (2022)	Woolworths FoodStop	Cape Town	1,040 (2025)	
Puma	2017; 9 years ago	Sandton		Circle K	Johannesburg	118 (2025)	
Sasol	1950; 76 years ago	Sandton	R249.09 billion (2025)	delight (in-house)	Sandton	354 (2025)	
Shell	1902; 124 years ago	Sandton		Spar express	Pinetown	591 (2025)	
Total	1954; 72 years ago	Johannesburg		bonjour (in-house)	Johannesburg	547 (2025)	
Total						4,000	

* Location totals are for gas stations, not convenience stores. Not all gas stations feature the listed partner convenience store.

== Big box ==
South Africa has a few big-box store chains. These sell general merchandise, such as major appliances and homeware, in a warehouse format. Some, like Makro, are warehouse clubs, where shoppers are required to sign up for a free membership card in order to purchase anything, and can buy items in wholesale quantities.

Two of South Africa's largest big box store chains, Makro and Game, are owned by retail corporation Massmart, which also owns home improvement chain Builders Warehouse.

Big box retailers in South Africa
Company	Founded	Headquarters	Number of locations	Revenue	Ref
Expert (including Tafelberg Furnishers & Kloppers)	1967; 59 years ago	Cape Town	38 (2025)		
Game	1970; 56 years ago	Johannesburg	150 (2025)		
Hirschs	1979; 47 years ago	Durban	15 (2025)		
Makro	1971; 55 years ago	Bedfordview	46 (2025)	R28.3 billion (2021)	
Walmart South Africa	2025; 1 year ago	Johannesburg	2 (2025)		
Total			251		

== Recreation ==
=== Gardening ===
- Stodels
- Cape Garden
- Starke Ayres
- Plantland
- Harry Goemans
- Heart & Soil Permaculture Farm

=== Outdoor ===
- Cape Union Mart
- Outdoor Warehouse
- Checkers Outdoor

=== Exercise & sports ===
Two of SA's largest sporting and exercise gear stores, Totalsports and Sportscene, are owned by diversified retail corporation TFG.

- Sportsmans Warehouse
- Sportscene
- Totalsports
- MRP Sport
- Burnt Clothing

=== Books ===
- Exclusive Books
- Bargain Books
- Readers Warehouse
- Wordsworth Books

== Pharmaceutical ==
South Africa has six major pharmacy chains. Some offer nursing facilities for things like vaccines, as well as sell personal care items, and a small selection of homeware items, at stores across South Africa. Medirite, the 5th largest, and Pharmacy at SPAR, the 6th largest, are owned by supermarket chains Shoprite and SPAR respectively.

Pharmaceutical retailers in South Africa
Company	Founded	Headquarters	Number of locations	Revenue	Ref
Alpha Pharm	1968; 58 years ago	Pretoria	350+ (2025)		
Clicks	2003; 23 years ago	Cape Town	780 (2025)	R48.6 billion (2022)	
Dis-Chem	1982; 44 years ago	Midrand	300+ (2025)	R39.17 billion (2025)	
Link Pharmacy	1984; 42 years ago	Roodepoort	300+ (2025)		
Medirite	1999; 27 years ago	Brackenfell	144 (2025)		
Pharmacy at SPAR	2013; 13 years ago	Pinetown	125 (2025)		
Total			1,999+		

== Home improvement ==
SA has just three major general home improvement chains. All large retailers in this sector, except French-based Leroy Merlin, are local companies. However, the country is also home to more specialized home improvement chains, such as Italtile's CTM, which focuses on tiles and bathroom fittings, as well as dedicated paint stores from manufacturers like Dulux. Other retail chains in this sector include Gelmar, DIY Depot, and Built it.

Home improvement retailers in South Africa
Company	Founded	Headquarters	Number of locations	Revenue	Ref
Brights Hardware	1971; 55 years ago	Brackenfell	9		
BUCO	1982; 44 years ago	Cape Town	72		
Builders Warehouse	2003; 23 years ago	Sandton	117 (2025)	1.18 billion (2024)	
Leroy Merlin	1923; 103 years ago	Sandton	5		
Mica Hardware	1983; 43 years ago	Bedfordview	160+		
Total			363+		

== Fashion ==
Three of South Africa's major supermarket chains also operate dedicated clothing stores, under separate brands - Woolworths' Edit stores, Pick n Pay's Pick n Pay Clothing brand, and Checkers' UNIQ Clothing by Checkers.

Pepkor is the parent company of both PEP and Ackermans clothing chains. MRP operates separate clothing and sportswear stores. TFG sells clothing under numerous brand names, as well as online, via its bash website. TFG also operates dedicated Sterns, Galaxy & Co, and American Swiss jewelry stores. Major fashion retail chains include:

- Woolworths (and standalone Edit stores)
- Pick n Pay Clothing
- UNIQ Clothing by Checkers
- MRP
- TFG
- Truworths
- PEP
- Ackermans
- Edgars
- Mareeth Colleen
- Me & B

== See also ==
- Economy of South Africa
- List of supermarket chains in South Africa
- List of shopping centres in South Africa
- Economy of Cape Town
- Automotive industry in South Africa
- Telecommunications in South Africa
- Internet in South Africa
