= List of assets owned by Walmart =

Walmart Inc. is the largest retailer in the world and one of the five largest corporations in the world by sales. As of 2022, the company is operational in Canada, Chile, China, India, Mexico, Nigeria, South Africa, the United Kingdom and the United States. Walmart ceased to be operational in Argentina, Brazil and Japan in previous years, as its ventures failed in those countries. Earlier, in 2006, the company lost its stores in Germany and South Korea.

== Stores ==
Argentina; Entered 1995	Walmart Argentina; Walmart Supercenter; Sam's Club; Changomás; De-consolidated in early 2021.
Botswana; Entered June 2011 (11)	Massmart; Game Foodco - 2; CBW - 7; Builders Warehouse - 2
Brazil; Entered May 1995	Walmart Brazil (disestablished in 2022); Nacional (Sonae); Bompreço/Super Bompreço (SuperMarket); Walmart Supercenter; Maxxi Atacado (Sonae); BIG (Sonae); Hiper Bompreço/Big bompreço (HyperMarket); Sam's Club; Mercadorama (Sonae); Walmart Posto (Gas Station); Supermercado Todo Dia; Hiper Toda Dia; De-consolidated in August 2018, with 20% now owned by the company and private equity firm Advent International owning 80%. Sold to Carrefour Brazil in June 2022.
Canada; Entered November 1994 (402)	Walmart Canada; Walmart Supercentre - 343; Walmart Discount Store - 59; Walmart Canada Logistics ULC (Warehouse and logistics was managed by Exel logistics under the name "SCM Inc" until June 30, 2014, when the operation was taken over by Walmart Canada and the name was changed to Walmart Logistics)
Chile; Entered January 2009 (384)	Walmart Chile; Lider Hiper - 97; Superbodega Acuenta - 122; Lider Express - 154; Central Mayorista - 11
China; Entered August 1996 (369)	Walmart China; Walmart Supercenter - 330; Sam's Club - 39; JD.com (12%)
Costa Rica; Entered September 2005 (290)	Walmart de México y Centroamérica; Palí - 189; Más X Menos - 38; Maxi Pali - 49; Walmart Supercenter - 14
El Salvador; Entered September 2005 (102)	Walmart de México y Centroamérica; Despensa Familiar - 63; La Despensa de Don Juan - 17; Maxi Despensa - 16; Walmart Supercenter - 6
Eswatini; Entered June 2011 (1)	Massmart; CBW - 1
Germany; Entered January 1998	Walmart Supercenter; disposal announced July 2006.
Ghana; Entered June 2011 (4)	Massmart; GameFoodco - 4
Guatemala; Entered September 2005 (263)	Walmart de México y Centroamérica; Despensa Familiar - 181; Paiz - 27; Maxi Despensa - 45; Walmart Supercenter - 10
Honduras; Entered September 2005 (111)	Walmart de México y Centroamérica; Despensa Familiar - 71; Maxi Despensa - 28; Paíz - 8; Walmart Supercenter - 4
India; Entered May 2009 (28)	Flipkart Private Limited; Best Price Modern Wholesale - 29; Flipkart; PhonePe
Japan; Entered March 2002	Seiyu Group; Seiyu Supermarket; Seiyu Hypermarket; Livin; Sunny; Seiyu (General Merchandise); De-consolidated in 2020, with 15 percent now owned by the company, KKR owning 65% and Rakuten DX Solutions owning 20%.
Kenya; Entered; 28 May 2015 (4)	Massmart; Game Foodco - 3; Builders Warehours - 1
South Korea; Entered July 1998	Walmart Supercenter - sold May 2006
Lesotho; Entered June 2011 (3)	Massmart; CBW - 2; Game Foodco - 1
Malawi; Entered June 2011 (2)	Massmart; Game - 2
Mauritius; Entered June 2011	Massmart; Game (closed January 2012)
Mexico; Entered November 1991 (2,804)	Walmart de México y Centroamérica; Bodega Aurrera Express - 1,229; Bodega Aurrera - 571; Mi Bodega Aurrera - 438; Walmart Supercenter - 300; Sam's Club - 167; Walmart Express - 99
Mozambique; Entered June 2011 (6)	Massmart; Builders Warehouse - 2; Game Foodco - 2; CBW - 1; Builders Express - 1
Namibia; Entered June 2011 (5)	Massmart; Game - 1; Game Foodco - 4
Nicaragua; Entered September 2005 (102)	Walmart de México y Centroamérica; Palí - 71; Maxi Pali - 20; Walmart Supercenter - 2; La Unión - 9
Nigeria; Entered June 2011 (5)	Massmart; Game - 3; Game Foodco - 2
South Africa; Entered June 2011 (361)	Massmart; Game - 39; CBW - 41; Game Foodco - 78; Builders Express - 50; Builders Warehouse - 34; Cambridge (supermarket) - 42; Makro - 23; Rhino (supermarket) - 15; Builders Trade Depot - 8; Jumbo - 13; Builders Superstore - 18
Tanzania; Entered June 2011 (1)	
Uganda; Entered June 2011 (1)	Massmart; Game - 1
United Kingdom; Entered July 1995	Asda; Asda Superstore; Asda Supermarket; Asda Living; Asda Supercentre; Asda Petrol Fueling Station; Asda Mobile; Asda Money; Sold to EG Group and TDR Capital in 2021, with Walmart retaining an equity investment.
United States; Entered July 1962	Total number of Walmart U.S. and Sam's Clubs combined - 5,320; Walmart U.S. - (4,720) (This unit count includes locations in the District of Columbia and Puerto Rico); Walmart Supercenter (3,572); Walmart Discount Store (365); Walmart Neighborhood Market (682); Other small formats (92); Convenience Stores (8); Pickup locations (1) closed on February 17, 2023; Walmart.com (online retailer); Sam's Club (600, including D.C. and Puerto Rico); Logistics; Walmart Transportation; Distribution Centers/Transportation Offices; Walmart Realty; Claims Management; Walmart Portrait Studios, formerly known as Portrait Studios until late 2006. (The Portrait Studios were operated by CPI Corp, Inc. under an agreement with Walmart until that company filed for Chapter 7 bankruptcy on May 1, 2013. Space is leased and they are independently owned and operated and only pay rent to Walmart and a license fee to use the Walmart brand.); The Walmart Money Center (formerly Wal-Mart Financial Services Network) is a tradename for financial services provided in their stores, including the Walmart Money Card, Money Transfers, Walmart Credit Card Bill Payments, Money Orders, Check Cashing and Check Printing.; Walmart Vision Centers (However, most doctors of optometry are independent contractors and not employees of Wal-Mart Stores, Inc., but instead pay rent to use space in Walmart and Sam's Club Vision Centers.); Walmart Labs; Walmart Claims Services; Walmart Soundcheck; Moosejaw Bought in 2017 and sold to Dick's Sporting Goods in March 2023; Jet.com Closed as of June 4, 2020; Hayneedle; Shoes.com Sold to CriticalPoint Capital in October 2020; ModCloth Sold to Go Global Retail in October 2019; Bonobos
Zambia; Entered June 2011 (7)	Massmart; CBW - 1; Game Foodco - 3; Builders Warehouse - 2; Builders Express - 1

== Acquisitions ==
- PACE Membership Warehouse (converted 91 to Sam's Club )
- Woolco Canada (converted to Walmart)
- Asda (acquired in 1999, later sold to EG Group in 2021. Walmart retains an equity investment in Asda and a seat on the board)
- McLane Company (acquired in 1993, later sold to Berkshire Hathaway in 2003)
- Wertkauf hypermarkets (Germany)
- Interspar hypermarkets (74 locations in Germany)
- Bompreco (Brazil)
- Walmart.com (started as a joint-venture, it has since been fully acquired and is a wholly owned subsidiary of Walmart)
- Sonae Distribuição Brasil (Brazilian operations) - now WMS Supermercados do Brasil.
- Seiyu Group - Walmart acquired a 6.1% stake in Seiyu beginning in May 2002. A majority interest (53%) was acquired in December 2005, giving Walmart effective control of the company. Walmart's stake in Seiyu was increased to 95% in December 2007, and by June 2008 the remaining shares were acquired, making it a wholly owned subsidiary. Sold a majority, 65%, in 2020 to KKR and a further 20% to Rakuten DX Solutions, leaving Walmart with 15%.
- Walmart de México y Centroamérica - In December 2009, Walmart Mexico acquired Walmart's operations in Central America from Walmart Stores and two minority partners. In early 2010, the transaction was completed and Walmart México became Walmart México and Central America. Walmart holds a 68.5% stake in the combined company.
  - Central American Retail Holding Company (CARHCO) - formed as a joint venture in 2001 with three equal partners: Royal Ahold NV and two Central American groups: the Paiz family, the major shareholders of La Fragua; and Corporación de Supermercados Unidos (CSU). In September 2005, Walmart acquired a 33 1/3% interest in CARHCO from the Dutch retailer Royal Ahold NV. In March 2006, Walmart made an additional investment, bringing its share of the firm to 51 percent and changing its name to Wal-Mart Central America.
  - Cifra - Walmart's operations in Mexico started as Walmex, a joint venture between Cifra of Mexico and Wal-Mart Stores, Inc. Walmart later bought a majority interest in Cifra and changed the name to Walmart de Mexico. Walmex is independently traded on the Mexican stock exchange, although Wal-Mart Stores, Inc. holds a majority interest.
- In January 2009, Walmart completed the acquisition of 58.2% of the leading Chilean retailer Distribucion y Servicio (D&S), adding brands of major importance in that market such as Híper Lider. By March 2009, Walmart had increased its stake in D&S to approximately 73%. D&S was renamed Walmart Chile. In February 2014 it was announced that Walmart had acquired the stock of the last major stockholders Mr. Felipe Ibanez Scott and Mr. Nicolas Ibáñez Scott, bringing the Walmart stake up to 99.72%. It was announced that Walmart intends to launch a cash tender offer for the remaining outstanding shares.
- In June 2011, Walmart completed the purchase of 51% of Massmart, which operates stores primarily in South Africa but also operates in various Sub-Saharan African nations. Brands added to the Walmart family include Cambridge Foods, Game, Dion Wired, Makro, Builders Warehouse, Builders Express, Builders Trade Depot, CBW, Jumbo Cash and Carry, and the Shield buying group. In July the South African government filed an appeal of the Competition Tribunal's decision to allow the merger with minimal conditions, this follows an appeal filed earlier by SACCAWU, a local labor union. By March 2012 the appeals court dismissed the case by the governmental ministries, but acknowledge that there were legitimate concerns about the effect of the deal on small producers and employment. The appeals court decision effectively put an end to the legal challenges to the merger.
- In October 2013, Walmart announced that it would end the 50/50 agreement with Bharti Enterprises. Bharti would operate its retail stores independently, and Wal-Mart Stores, Inc takes 100% ownership of the 20 Best Price Modern Wholesale cash and carry business operating in India.
- Modcloth
- Parcel
- Art.com
- Vizio (acquired in December 2024)

== Former operations ==
- Amigo (acquired in 2002, sold to Pueblo in 2022) In June 2022, the sale of the remaining 11 Amigo Supermarkets to Pueblo Supermarkets was announced, the brand name will remain and the 1,100 employees will keep their jobs. On August 26, 2022, the Amigo supermarkets closed their doors at 6pm to begin the transition of Matrix companies from Walmart to Pueblo; the possible reopening of the Amigo was scheduled for September 1.
- Bonobos (Acquired in 2017, sold to WHP Global and Express in 2023)
- Broadstreet Financial Services Corporation (d/b/a Bank of Wal-Mart) was tentatively to be headquartered in Salt Lake City, Utah and was to operate as an Industrial Bank to processing credit, debit card and electronic check transactions for the Walmart stores. The bank was not to be open to the public and they did not intend to open or operate any branches. According to a Walmart spokesman, it was estimated that the company would have saved $245 million in costs by opening its own bank. On March 16, 2007, Walmart announced that it had officially withdrawn its application with the Utah Department of Financial Institutions.
- Bud's Discount City was a unique store as retail stores go. The store chain, associated directly with Walmart itself, relied not on purchased goods for sale; but instead sold items which had been either a.) returned to a Walmart for exchange, b.) reconditioned items, such as electronics, or c.) items which had been discontinued and stock needed to be liquidated. The first location opened in 1990 and was named after Bud Walton, Sam Walton's brother and co-founder of Wal-Mart. Most Bud's Discount Stores (sometimes just called "Bud's", and until 1995 "Bud's Warehouse Outlet") were located in old Walmart storefronts, with the typical situation being a Bud's would replace the old storefront after Walmart had constructed a newer store for its main Walmart storefront, sometimes merely to satisfy existing lease agreements with those strip centers. As Walmart transitioned from selling items they themselves purchased, to a business model where vendors rented floor space, the need for an outlet store to deal with defective and discontinued items phased out. As a result of this, the Bud's Discount City chain was phased out in 1998.
- Dot Discount Drugs
- Helen's Arts and Crafts
- Hypermart USA (joint venture, prototype store that led to Supercenters)
- Jet.com (online store; acquired in 2016; shut down in 2020)
- McLane Company (acquired in 1990, sold to Berkshire Hathaway in 2003)
- Moosejaw (acquired 2017, sold to Dick's Sporting Goods in 2023)
- OneSource nutrition centers
- Save-Co Home Improvement Center
- Vudu (acquired in 2010, sold to Fandango Media in 2020)
- Wal-mart Vacations (online travel service; Walmart continues to offer online travel services through partnerships, usually creating a new name for the service when a new partnership is formed)

== See also ==
- Walmart
- Sam's Club
- Lists of corporate assets

== Further information ==
- Why Walmart Is Failing In Japan. CNBC. 2018-10-23. Archived from the original on 2021-12-22. - About Walmart's ownership of Seiyu Group
