= List of supermarket chains in South Africa =

This is the list of supermarket chains in South Africa.

- Bargain Express/Wholesale
- Builders Warehouse
- SEGWAGWA Cash n Carry
- Advance Cash n Carry
- 7 Eleven (OK Franchise)
- Boxer Stores
- Cambridge Food
- Checkers
- Checkers Hyper
- Checkout renamed as Checkrite
- Choppies
- Devland Metro Cash & Carry
- Friendly (OK Franchise)
- Discount Cash & Carry
- Food Lover's Market
- Foodzone Group
- Game
- Jumbo Cash & Carry
- Kit Kat Group
- Makro
- MEGASAVE (Cash & Carry)
- OK Bazaars
- OK Grocer
- OK Minimark
- OK Value
- Pick n Pay
- Pick n Pay Hypermarket
- Rhino Cash & Carry
- Shoprite
- Shoprite Hyper
- Spar
- AM:PM (Online supermarket)
- Br!ng (Online supermarket)
- Woolworths
- Walmart South Africa
- USave
- USave Superstore
- Checkstar
- BIBI Cash and Carry
