= Game (South African retailer) =

South African retail chain

- Type: Division
- Industry: Retail
- Founded: 1970; 56 years ago
- Headquarters: Johannesburg, Gauteng, South Africa
- Number of locations: 111 (2026)
- Area served: Africa
- Products: Appliances; Electronics; Groceries; Liquor
- Owner: Walmart
- Parent: Massmart
- Website: www.game.co.za

Game is a South African general merchandise retail chain, founded in 1970 and headquartered in Johannesburg. As of 2026, Game has a total of 111 stores across seven countries in Africa. The majority of its stores (around 88%) are located in South Africa.

At its peak, the brand had at least 150 operating stores. It was bought out by Walmart / Massmart in 2022.

== History ==
Game was founded in 1970 by Alan Hellman and Jack Schaeffer, who opened the first store on Smith Street in Durban. The founders sought to make shopping more entertaining and developed the Game name and distinctive pink branding around this concept. This stood in contrast to commonly conservative local retail aesthetics in the 1970s.

Game introduced the big box store discount concept to South Africa, undercutting traditional department stores with 30% markdowns across a mix of merchandise. The company was also one of the earliest retailers to drive the widespread adoption and sale of televisions when broadcasts began in South Africa in 1976.

During the 1970s and 1980s, Game expanded from a regional discount retailer into a national chain. By the end of the 20th century, it had 52 stores across South Africa.

Game began expanding outside South Africa in 1993, when it opened its first international store in Gaborone, Botswana. It subsequently expanded into Namibia, opening a store in Windhoek in 1996, and then into Zambia.

In 1998, Massmart acquired Game from McCarthy Retail for R755 million. Game subsequently became part of Massmart's Massdiscounters division, alongside Dion.

In 2011, US retail corporation Walmart acquired a 51% stake in Massmart, bringing Game under Walmart's majority ownership.

In 2020, amid declining Game sales, Massmart launched a turnaround program focused on improving Game's product assortment, stock availability, and customer proposition. The retailer also began reducing its reliance on traditional general merchandise and electronics by expanding into groceries and other categories.

From 2020, Game underwent a major store and merchandise revamp known as "Game Reimagined". By 2022, about 114 stores had been refurbished, while underperforming stores were being closed.

In November 2022, Walmart completed its acquisition of the remaining shares in Massmart, taking the company private and making Game a wholly owned Walmart business through Massmart.

Game subsequently reduced its South African store footprint. The chain had approximately 150 South African stores in 2019, but this had decreased to around 122 by 2024.

Starting in 2025, some Game stores were converted into small format Makro and Walmart outlets in Gauteng. Massmart has not announced a formal strategy to convert all of the remaining Game stores into other retail brands.

== Operations ==
In 2026, Game operated a total of 111 stores across seven African countries. Of these, 98 were situated in its home country of South Africa.

As of October 2026, Game had closed 28 South African stores since 2025.

== See also ==
- Retailing in South Africa
