= Makro =

Dutch brand of warehouse clubs

Makro (Dutch)
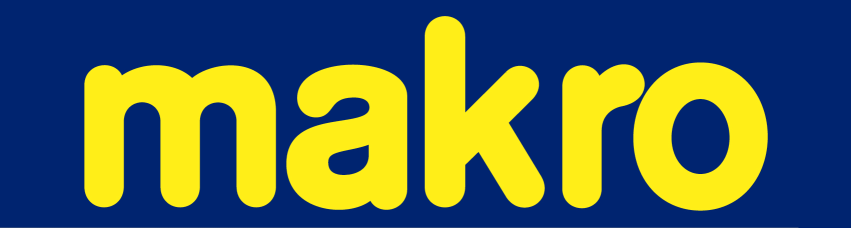
- Makro logo used in Europe

- Makro logo used in South America
- Product type: Warehouse clubs Cash and carry stores
- Current owner: SHV Holdings (South America); InRetail (Peru); Metro AG (Europe); Tesco/Booker Group (UK); Massmart (South Africa); CP Axtra (Asia)
- Introduced: 1968; 58 years ago (Netherlands)
- Related brands: Metro
- Markets: Europe: Czech Republic; Netherlands; Poland; Portugal; Slovakia; Spain; United Kingdom; South America: Argentina; Colombia; Peru; Venezuela; Asia: Cambodia; Myanmar; Thailand; Africa: South Africa

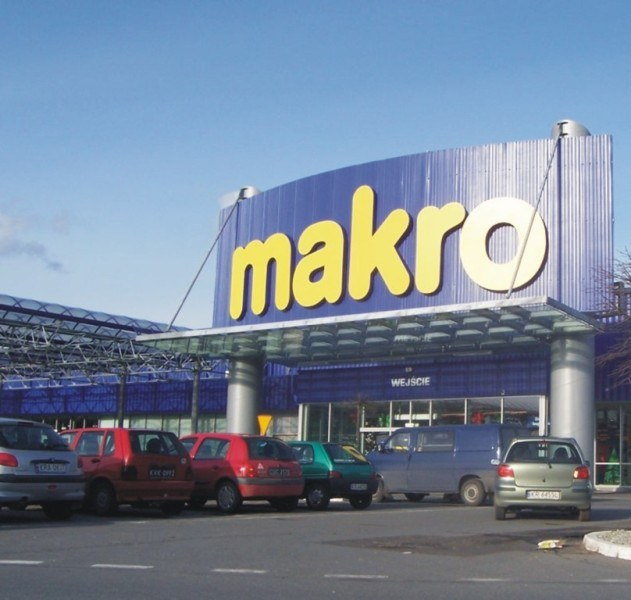
Makro in Kraków, Poland

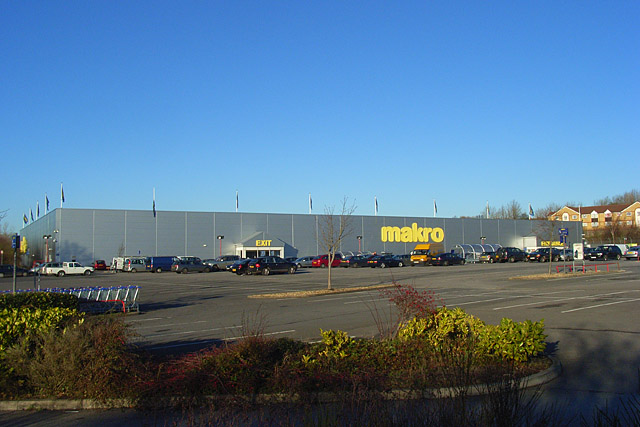
Makro in Reading, England

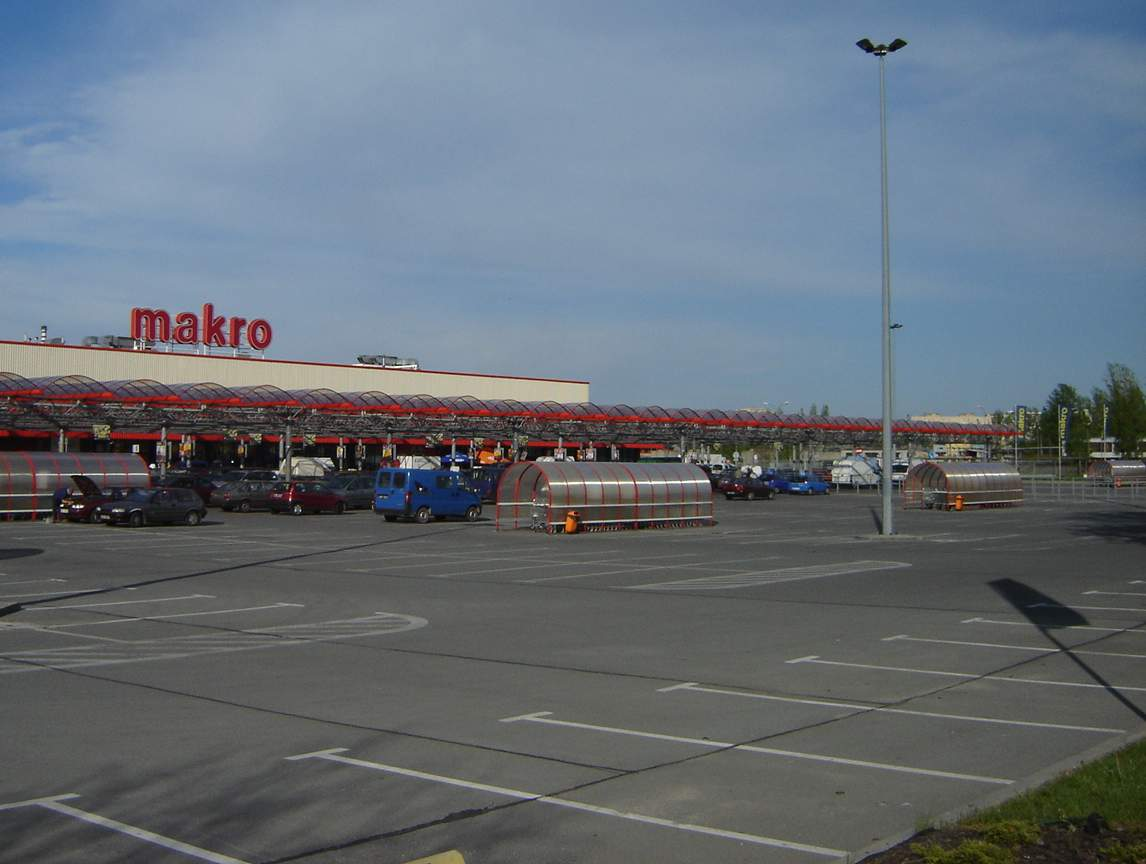
Makro with previous logo in Częstochowa, Poland

Previous Makro logo (1993–2014)

Makro is a Dutch international brand of warehouse clubs, also called cash and carry stores. Makro was founded by SHV Holdings, a Dutch conglomerate based in Utrecht in partnership with German company Metro AG, with the first warehouse club opened in Amsterdam in 1968.

Currently, ownership of the worldwide chain of stores is split between different companies like Metro AG in Europe (except UK), SHV Holdings in South America (except Peru) and CP All in Asia. In many countries, access to stores is restricted to business customers, and the stores are not open to the general public.

== History ==
SHV originated in 1896 from a merger between a number of large coal mining companies, some of which had been active since the 18th century.

In 1968, the first Makro store opened in Amsterdam. In the following years more stores opened in the Netherlands and several other European countries. In April 1971 the first Makro in the UK opened in Eccles, Manchester. Also in 1971, the first Makro store outside Europe opened in South Africa.

In the 1970s and 1980s, Makro extended its business to the Americas and Asia. Makro had also expanded to the United States in the mid-1980s. In 1989, Kmart bought the US locations, and converted most of them to Pace Warehouse in 1990.

Makro expanded to Asia with its first store in Thailand in 1989. Operating as Siam Makro, the company is a joint venture between Charoen Pokphand and SHV Holdings. In 1994, Siam Makro planned to be listed in the Stock Exchange of Thailand to fund an expansion programme.

The South African stores were subsequently in 1990 exchanged for a shareholding in Massmart and in 2004 SHV sold its Massmart shares.

Makro began operations in Malaysia around 1994 with its first outlet in Shah Alam, followed by another one in Selayang and in Johor Bahru. Makro Malaysia was a partnership between its parent Dutch company, the Selangor State Development Corporation (PKNS) and PKNS-Inchcape (a joint venture between PKNS and Inchcape). In its first year of operation, Makro Malaysia invested a total of RM 90 million. It had plans to open six to eight outlets in a few years.

In 1998, owner SHV Holdings sold the Makro stores in Europe to German partner Metro AG. The sale, announced on 29 October 1997, was approved by the supervisory board of Metro AG on 17 December 1997.

Makro entered the Philippine market in 1996 through a joint venture with SM Prime Holdings and the Ayala Group. In 2004, Ayala sold its 28% stake to its joint venture partners. By late 2007, SM Investments Corporation increased its ownership in Pilipinas Makro to 60% and subsequently integrated Makro stores into its operations. Eventually, the SM Investments Corporation acquired full ownership of Makro and rebranded all its stores as SM Hypermarket and Savemore. Makro is set to return in the Philippines through a partnership between the Ayala Group and CP Axtra, with its comeback flagship store located at Ayala Malls Cloverleaf, aiming to reclaim the spot taken over by S&R and Landers from its initial departure.

On 31 January 2007, Makro Malaysia was acquired by Tesco and the 8 stores in Malaysia were converted to Tesco Extra.

In 2010, Makro Cash & Carry Indonesia was sold to Lotte Mart and rebranded as Lotte Mart Wholesale.

In 2011 Walmart took ownership of Makro in South Africa after acquiring a majority stake in Massmart (which Walmart would fully acquire later in the year).

In 2012, Metro sold the Makro UK business to Booker Group, while Makro-Habib in Pakistan was rebranded as Metro-Habib.

In 2013, SHV sold Siam Makro Pcl. (Thailand) to CP ALL, a subsidiary of CP Group.

In 2014, Metro sold the Makro Greek business to Sklavenitis and rebranded as The Mart in 2016.

In 2020, 30 of 54 Makro stores in Brazil, were acquired by Carrefour.

In December 2022, Makro Cash & Carry Belgium went bankrupt. All 6 shops closed permanently.

== Store locations ==
European stores can be found in the Netherlands, the Czech Republic, Slovakia, Poland, Portugal, Spain and the United Kingdom. Stores have spread to Colombia, South Africa, Argentina, Peru, Venezuela, Cambodia, Myanmar, and Thailand.

Makro stores formerly existed in Brazil, China, Greece, Belgium, Indonesia, Malaysia, Morocco, Pakistan, the Philippines, South Korea, Taiwan and the United States.

=== Netherlands ===
Makro Netherlands operates 17 stores across the Netherlands, with seven of the stores also containing a fuel station. Makro Netherlands is owned by the Metro Group. Since January 2018, The Chief Executive Officer is Paulo Peerenboom.

=== South Africa ===
Massmart (wholly owned by Walmart since 2020) operates 46 Makro stores in South Africa (23 general warehouse stores, and 23 Makro Liquor stores). Customers need a free Makro card to make purchases, and can obtain one in store or online. Makro South Africa is headquartered in Sandton, Gauteng, and imports certain Walmart private label items for the South African market.

The retail chain sells, among other things, electronics, major appliances, camping gear, sports equipment, homeware, food, clothing, and alcohol. In 2024 and 2025, it was found in a local news outlet's study to be the cheapest out of 6 major South African grocery retailers.

=== Spain ===
- Makro España was founded in 1972
- Operates 37 stores in 15 different regions
- Had a total of 3700 employees (2021)
- 2021 sales was €1097 million

=== Thailand ===
CP Axtra Public Company Limited was established in 1988. At the end of April 2020 there were 100 Makro stores and Makro FoodService stores in operation, serving a registered customer base of 2.6 million. Revenues for 2020 were 210 billion baht with a net profit of 6.2 billion baht. Siam Makro shares are traded on the Stock Exchange of Thailand (SET).

In 2013, Siam Makro was purchased by Charoen Pokphand Group for US$6.6 billion. CP Axtra (known as Siam Makro until 2023) is owned by CP ALL, a subsidiary of CP Group.

=== United Kingdom ===
Makro UK operates 30 branches across the United Kingdom. Since 2012 Makro UK has been owned by Booker Group, and 11 of the Makro branches now operate as a combined Booker/Makro.

=== Venezuela ===
SVH operates 35 Makro warehouse clubs across the country and also have a supermarket chain named Mikro with 19 stores.

== Product range ==
Makro sells food and non-food products, usually located in different sections of the store. Each store also contains a hot-food cafeteria, and a cash machine.

The food section always includes a fresh fish section, a wine section, fresh meat and butchery department, and refrigerated aisles. The non-food area includes clothing, DIY, office supplies, electricals, computing, and seasonals such as garden furniture.

Special offers are featured via a printed and online fortnight brochure known as Makro Mail.

The stores are not open to the general public, but serve the following trades:

- Newsagent's shops and convenience stores.
- Restaurants, hotels and caterers.
- Schools, universities, sport clubs and associations.

Customers can shop at Makro with a membership card.

Makro UK used to have the tag-line "The UK's No.1 Discounter". This tag-line was replaced with "For Professionals". Makro has subsequently changed this to "Your business partner everyday" [sic].

Recent changes to the Makro UK structure include the closure of three stores: Wolverhampton, Coventry and Swansea. Metro announced that the company has to be financially independent by 2011, and in 2012 Makro UK was sold to the rival wholesaler Booker Group in an agreement valued at around £140 million.
