= Yoco =

South African fintech company

- Type: Private startup
- Industry: Fintech
- Founded: 2014; 12 years ago
- Founder: Katlego Maphai; Carl Wazen; Bradley Wattrus; Lungisa Matshoba
- Headquarters: Cape Town, South Africa
- Area served: South Africa
- Key people: Katlego Maphai (CEO); Lungisa Matshoba (CTO)
- Products: Card machines
- Services: Online payment services
- Number of employees: ~ 400 (2025)
- Website: yoco.com

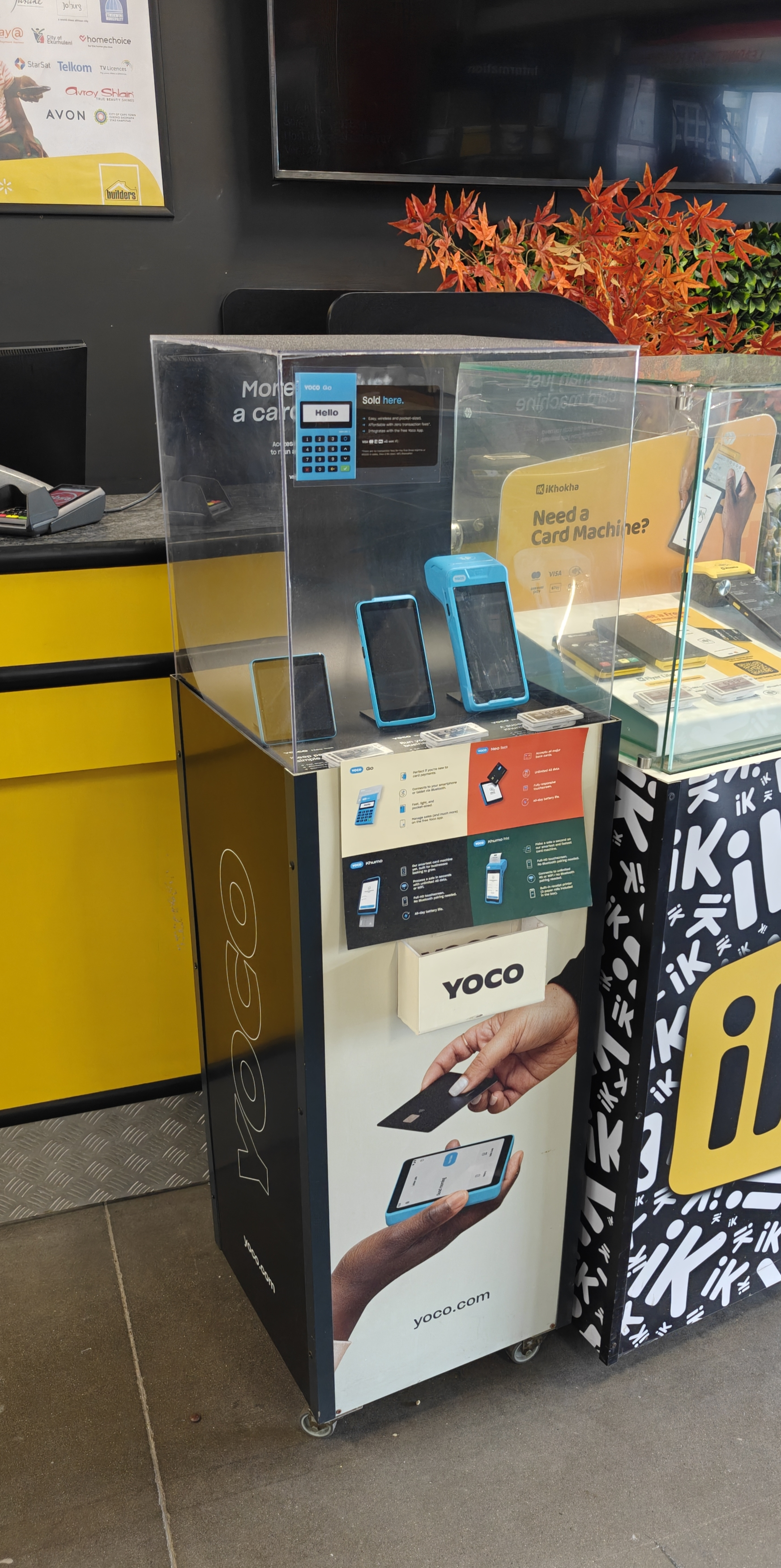
Yoco product display, showing the company's payment terminals, at a Builders Warehouse in Cape Town

Yoco (stylized in all caps) is a South African fintech company that provides point-of-sale payment hardware and software solutions to small and medium sized businesses.

Headquartered in Cape Town, Yoco has operations across numerous African and Middle Eastern countries.

As a startup, the company has, as of 2025, raised over R1.7 billion in funding. In the same year, it had over 200,000 customers, an estimated value of R12.5 billion, and was processing over R34 billion a year via its payment platform.

== History ==
Yoco was founded in 2014, by four friends - Katlego Maphai, Carl Wazen, Bradley Wattrus, and Lungisa Matshoba. The four were inspired to found Yoco after witnessing the success of US payments company Square. Part of the motivation was also as a result of Maphai experiencing a makeshift electronic payment system while at a Silicon Valley restaurant.

After two years of preparation, the company processed its first transaction in October 2014.

In an interview at the University of Cape Town (UCT) in 2016, Yoco's CEO stated that over 27 million people in South Africa had bank cards, but only 6% of sellers accepted card payments. He said Yoco sought to fix that situation.

In March 2016, Western Cape Premier, Alan Winde, visited Yoco's Cape Town CBD head office and met with the company's CEO, to showcase the spirit of entrepreneurial innovation in the province. Winde stated that Yoco had developed a solution which responded to the needs of small business, and which reduced the red tape those businesses faced in processing payments. At the time of Winde's visit, Yoco employed 24 people, had around 1,000 clients, and was processing around R300 million in annual transactions.

At the end of 2016, Yoco had 5,000 customers, up from around 500 in 2015.

Yoco launched a new division, Yoco Capital, in October 2018. The service offers clients instant financing that can be used to grow their businesses, and paid back through their transactions.

In the same year, the company secured Series B funding totaling R224 million. That brought the total amount of funding Yoco had received to R322 million. At Series B, Yoco had 27,000 merchants on its platform, and was adding around 1,500 a month, as well as processing R3.5 billion a year in card sales. At the time, Yoco stated that despite South Africa having a card penetration rate of 75%, only 7% of South African small businesses accepted card payments.

Yoco announced in September 2019 that in under a year, it had granted R55 million in small business loans, with just 2% of those businesses defaulting.

In October 2020, Yoco launched the Yoco Neo, the company's first standalone card machine that does not require a smart device or Bluetooth to enable payments.

In 2021, Yoco announced a Series C funding round worth R1.23 billion - the largest single investment ever raised by a South African payments company and one of the largest in Africa. Its CEO stated that the capital injection would translate into an acceleration of economic access for small businesses in the regions Yoco serves.

Aside from through its existing online channel, Yoco began offering its card machines to consumers via major South African retail chains in October 2021. Retailers include Builders Warehouse and Makro.

Also in 2021, Yoco estimated that the transaction value gap, created by businesses not being able to access viable card payment solutions and consumers wanting to pay electronically, was valued at approximately R1.5 trillion. The company stated that there were over 6 million small businesses in South Africa, and well over 100 million across the Middle East and Africa, that still transacted only in cash at the time.

Yoco partnered with Taiwanese semiconductor manufacturer MediaTek in December 2023, to source the latter's Genio series of Internet of Things (IoT) chipsets. The chipsets were used to power Yoco's Neo Touch 4G card machine.

At the Xero Roadshow in May 2025, it was announced that Yoco had integrated its payments platform with cloud-based accounting software company Xero's product. With the goal of streamlining small businesses’ finances, the partnership automatically syncs sales and pay-out data from Yoco into the Xero platform.

In September 2025, Yoco's CEO, Katlego Maphai, announced that he was stepping down after a decade of managing the company. He said that there had been recent major shifts in the South African payments processing landscape, such as local "big five" bank Nedbank acquiring one of Yoco's competitors, iKhokha. Other examples Maphai gave were Lesaka Technologies acquiring payments processor Adumo, as well as digital-only bank Bank Zero, and big five bank Capitec launching its own competing solution to Yoco. Maphai said that fresh skills were required to scale the company.

As part of the managerial transition, Co-Founders Lungisa Matshoba and Bradley Wattrus would begin serving as Co-CEOs. Maphai would remain at Yoco in a Founder capacity, to drive long-term projects.

In June 2026, Yoco launched a subscription service that enabled its customers to establish their own card-linked loyalty programs. At the time of launch, Yoco said that most of its merchants have returning customers, and that loyalty programs were a mechanism that small independent businesses used to retain customers. The loyalty program would be managed in-app, and payments made on Yoco-branded payment terminals would generate loyalty points. Yoco's rollout followed a 2025 study that showed that 82% of South Africans use loyalty programs in some form.

== Operations ==
Yoco offers businesses a variety of touchscreen card machines, a point-of-sale console, an online payments solution, and capital for growth.

The company's Khumo payment terminal is designed, assembled, and packaged in South Africa.

Yoco currently operates in South Africa, but plans to expand to the rest of Africa, as well as the Middle East.

== Mergers and acquisitions ==
Yoco has acquired numerous companies throughout its growth, including:

Companies acquired by Yoco
Company	Type	Date of acquisition	Notes
Cobi Interactive	Software developer	2019	
Dado	E-commerce developer	2021	
Nona Digital	Fintech and Web3 developer	March 2022	Yoco had been a client of Nona since 2019.

== Events and sponsorships ==
Yoco hosts and partners with events centered around small business development.

- Yoco is a sponsor of the annual Best of the Cape Awards, and offers its own Yoco’s Choice Award. Best of the Cape, hosted on radio station kfm, offers locals the opportunity to vote on their favorite establishments in Cape Town, across a variety of categories.
- The company hosts Yoco Exchange, an annual event for South African entrepreneurs. The event is geared towards providing these businesses with opportunities to network, and attend talks and workshops.

== Investors ==
Yoco's investors, across multiple funding rounds, include Dragoneer Investment Group (which has previously invested in fintech firms Nubank, Square, and Klarna), Partech, Velocity Capital Fintech Ventures, Orange Ventures Quona Capital, Breyer Capital, HOF Capital and 4DX Ventures.

Futuregrowth Asset Management became Yoco's first South African institutional investor during the latter's Series B funding round in 2018.

Yoco has had 3 successful funding rounds, having secured Series C funding in 2021.

== See also ==
- Cape Town tech industry
- Banking in South Africa
- Economy of the Western Cape
