= Coffee culture in Cape Town =

Cape Town has a well-known coffee culture, and the city is globally recognised for the beverage.

The city is known as an international coffee capital, and is home to multiple breweries, coffeehouse chains, and independent cafés.

== History ==
Coffee beans arrived on the shores of Cape Town in the late 1800s. Modern coffee culture is said to have begun in the city in the early 2000s, when a handful of coffee connoisseurs set up coffeehouses around Cape Town. Since then, Cape Town's coffee industry has grown to boast the largest number of independent roasters in South Africa, and Cape Town CBD alone is home to over than 70 coffeehouses.

In 2003, the Cape Gourmet Festival hosted the Cape Town Coffee Route, showcasing over 40 coffee shops from around the city.

In 2007, David Donde, former co-owner of Origin Coffee Roasting and founder of Truth Coffee, started the Specialty Coffee Association of South Africa (SCASA). The association is dedicated to promoting the quality and sustainability of specialty coffee in Southern Africa, and supporting the recognition and development of the Southern African coffee industry through education, training, and the hosting of coffee competitions.

In 2019, the first Cape Town Coffee Festival was hosted, at the historic Castle of Good Hope. The 2-day event featured over 65 exhibitors, as well as a workshop on the history of coffee, hosted by the Small Business Lab. Furthermore, the festival had experiential features including Latte Art Live. Professional baristas, including South Africa's Latte Art Champion, Christopher Abrahams, and the country's Barista Champion, Winston Thomas, demonstrated their latte art techniques.

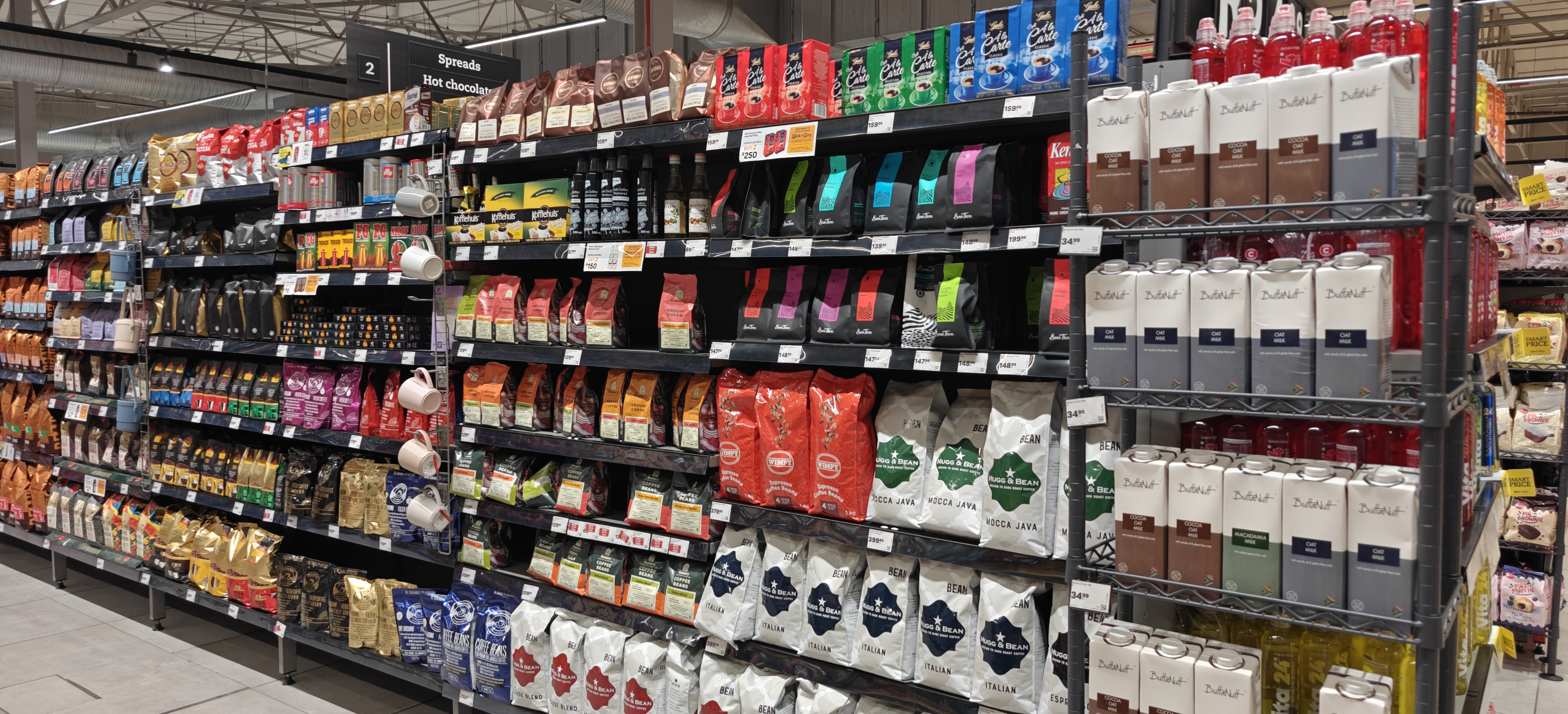
Coffee beans from various producers in a PnP store in Cape Town

== Coffee industry ==
Cape Town is home to multiple roasteries, including Seattle Coffee Company's roastery in Muizenberg, Bootlegger Coffee Company, Flatmountain Coffee, Cedar Coffee Roasters, and Espresso Lab's facilities in Woodstock, Rosetta Roastery's exclusively single-origin facility in Claremont, Origin and Ground Art Caffe's roasteries in De Waterkant, and Truth and Deluxe Coffeeworks' roasteries in Cape Town CBD. Numerous of these roasteries cater to the wholesale market.

Origin, based in Cape Town, releases up to 50 speciality-grade coffees from a variety of origins around the world each year. The company also provides free professional barista training to its wholesalers' baristas. Origin is a partner with other coffeemakers in the nonprofit African School of Coffee (ASC), and has thus far trained around 3,500 baristas.

SA's largest coffeehouse chain, Vida e Caffè, trains its baristas (referred to as Passionistas) for at least 3 months before they work in stores. The company also partnered with Redberry Coffee (the Redberry Coffee Collective) to sell the latter's coffee in vida stores.

Cedar Coffee Roasters provides barista training, equipment sourcing and installation, coffee program set up assistance, and roasting. It was founded by the former roastery manager of Rosetta Roastery, and a former wholesale relations employee from Origin Coffee Roasting, who also headed up the Barista Academy. The latter won the South African Barista Championships in 2018 and 2020 and the African Barista Championships in 2019.

Truth Roasting Company, based in Cape Town CBD, offers professional barista training, as well as alternative brewing and coffee appreciation courses. It does so via a partnership with the African School of Coffee, and trains around 500 people a year.

Platō Coffee, SA's fourth-largest coffeehouse chain by number of locations, operates Platō Academy, a barista and specialty coffee training center, in the Cape Town suburb of District Six. Built in late 2025, the center provides courses ranging from foundational barista training to latte art workshops, and caters to all skill levels. Platō Academy serves as the training center for the company's baristas and franchise partners, has a showroom for professional coffee equipment, and aims to serve as a meeting place for coffee professionals and casual coffee enthusiasts.

Multiple companies in and around Cape Town offer coffee tastings, as well as tours of the local coffee industry and information about the city's coffee history and brewing methods.

== Retailers ==
=== Chain stores ===
In terms of chain stores, the South African (and by extension, Cape Town) coffee market is dominated by local brands. The headquarters of four out of South Africa's five largest coffeehouse chains are located in Cape Town. These are:

- Vida, founded in 2001: 400 locations
- Seattle, founded in 1993: 297 locations
- WCafe: 220+ locations
- Bootlegger, founded in 2013: 80+ locations

Platō Coffee, SA's fourth-largest coffeehouse chain (at 150 locations) has numerous stores across Cape Town. The city has Platō's second-highest number of locations.

Smaller local chains include Deluxe and Shift Espresso Bar.

Foreign coffeehouse companies, such as US-based Starbucks and UK-based Costa Coffee are operational, but have a far smaller presence.

=== Incorporated barista stations ===
South Africa's largest filling station chain, Engen Petroleum, headquartered in Cape Town, operates two separate coffee brands. The first is Cafe 365, and the chain opened its 365th outlet in September 2024. Engen also has its own brand of premium coffee, called Brazmata. The brand is featured at barista stations at around 100 Engen forecourts, and offers takeaway and bagged bean options.

=== Independent outlets ===
Cape Town has numerous independent coffeehouses, including Truth, Origin, Rosetta, Kamili, Against the Grain, Espresso Lab, Nøsh, and Olympia.

== Recognition ==
In Barcelona-based World's 100 Best Coffee Shops' 2025 ranking, Cape Town's Espresso Lab, established in 2009, was voted the 11th best coffee shop in the world, and the best in Africa.

Truth Coffee, situated in Cape Town CBD, was voted Best Coffee Shop in the World in 2015 and 2016 by the UK's Daily Telegraph.

In 2024, Cape Town was ranked as the world's 9th best city for coffee by US Food & Wine magazine.

== See also ==
- Coffeehouse
- Coffee culture
- Coffee in world cultures
- List of coffeehouse chains
