= Cape Union Mart =

South African outdoor gear retailer

- Display on the side of a Cape Union store in Tyger Valley, Cape Town
- Industry: Retail
- Founded: 1933; 93 years ago
- Headquarters: Cape Town, South Africa
- Number of locations: 116 (2025)
- Area served: Southern Africa
- Key people: Philip Krawitz (Founder); Mike Elliott (CEO)
- Products: Outdoor equipment Outdoor apparel
- Number of employees: 311 (Factory only)
- Website: www.capeunionmart.co.za

Entrance to a Cape Union Mart store

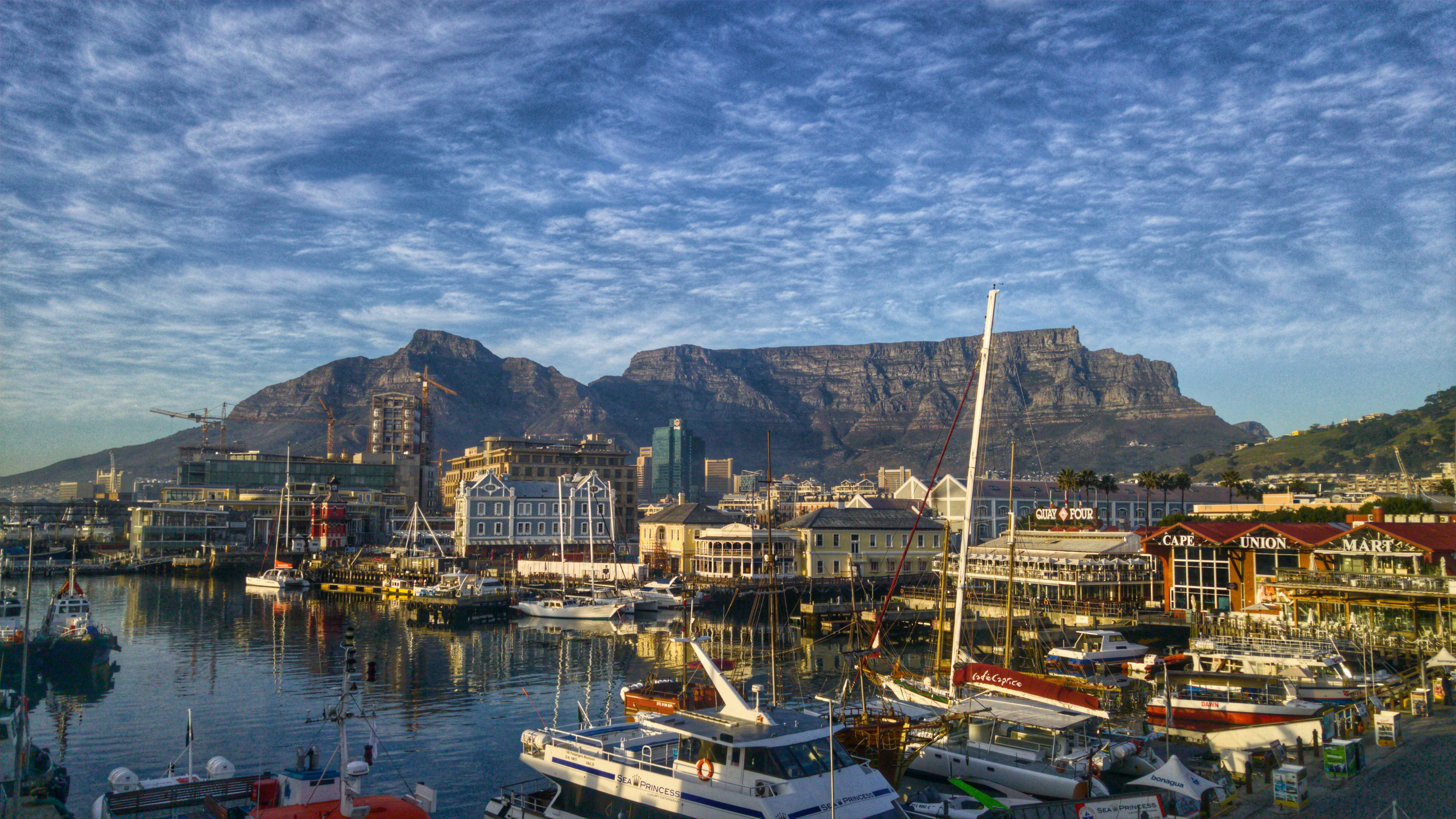
The Cape Union Mart Adventure Center (right) in the V&A Waterfront; one of the retailer's largest stores

Cape Union Mart (commonly referred to as Cape Union) is a South African outdoor gear retail chain, focusing on equipment and apparel for hiking, running, skiing, camping, travel, and safaris.

The company was founded in 1933, and is headquartered in Cape Town. It operates online, and runs 116 physical stores in Southern Africa.

== History ==
Cape Union Mart was founded in Cape Town in 1933 by Philip Krawitz, who wanted the store to be known as “Tavern of the Seas”, for servicemen and tourists passing through the city. The product offering at the Corporation Street store, compared to the top retailers of the time, was diverse, and the outlet became known as ‘The friendly store’.

In the early 1950s, Krawitz introduced South African consumers to international brands and items such as Levi's jeans, the Hong Kong Anorak, Norwegian socks, Gore-Tex foul weather jackets, and drip-dry safari suits.

In 1997, Cape Union opened its first factory, in the neighborhood of Ottery, Cape Town, which is still in existence as of 2025.

Cape Union launched its own brand of outdoor equipment and apparel, called K-Way, in 1981.

In 2002, the company opened its first stores outside South Africa, in Botswana and Namibia.

Cape Union launched its first TV campaign, with advertising agency King James, in 2004. The 6 ads featured as part of the campaign, which ran for a few weeks on local stations SABC 2 and SABC 3, illustrated how Cape Union Mart uses nature to inspire their product innovations.

In 2006, Cape Union launched another in-house brand; a women's clothing line called poetry.

Cape Union launched a large experiential store in Century City, called the Canal Walk Adventure Center, in 2012.

In 2024, the retailer began selling jackets for dogs.

Also in 2024, Cape Union Mart's Supply Chain Executive thanked the Localisation Support Fund (LSF), South African non-profit organization focused on the local manufacturing industry, for its efforts to strengthen the country's retail sector.

The LSF seeks to drive economic growth, accelerate industrialization in South Africa, and position local firms for long-term success, including through its Retail-Clothing, Textile, Footwear, and Leather (R-CTFL) Masterplan. The LSF aims to create 330,000 jobs, and grow South African retail sales to R250 billion by 2030, which directly impacts the growth of Cape Union, among other, similar retailers.

In the same year, Cape Union's K-Way brand partnered with South African company Sealand to launch a sustainable, locally-produced collection of outdoor apparel and equipment such as backpacks and bags. The K-Way x Sealand collection is made from recycled materials, aligning with both brands’ philosophies of protecting the environment. Limited quantities of the items were released at select Sealand and Cape Union stores in November 2024.

== Operations ==
Cape Union Mart operates 116 stores across Southern Africa, including 107 inSouth Africa, four in Botswana, and five in Namibia. Some locations, including stores at the V&A Waterfront and Canal Walk shopping centre, are large-format outlets that feature amenities such as rock climbing walls and artificial weather rooms for testing outdoor equipment.

The company manufactures apparel in its own factory in Ottery, Cape Town, and also sources goods from suppliers in South Africa, Mauritius, Madagascar, and Europe.

Products manufactured by Cape Union undergo endurance testing, including for aspects such as fabric weight, thread count, fabric strength, water repellence, water resistance, ageing, and down migration, and color fastness.

The company has an in-house brand called K-Way, which has gained significant traction in the South African outdoor apparel market. Other private label brands include Old Khaki and poetry. Cape Union also offers branding of items for corporate purposes.

Other brands sold by the retailer include its own in-house Cape Union brand, Last Chance, Rare Earth, Kaliber, Malkin, Contigo, Insta360, Sealand, Adidas, ASICS, GoPro, Hi-Tec, Hydro Flask, Instax, Island Tribe, LifeTrek, Midland, Stanley, PUMA, Seagull, Under Armour, Thule, Totes, Tonglite, Travelon, Tankwa, Ultra-tec, Veldskoen, Versus, Vortex, Garmin, The North Face, Crocs, HOKA, Waboba, XTM, Salomon, Caterpillar, and TentCo.

Some brands, such as Midland, Storm, and XTM, are exclusive to Cape Union.

== Corporate social responsibility ==
Cape Union Mart supports ethical sourcing, using predominantly sustainable materials, supporting local suppliers, and establishing green factories.

The company's factory uses a philosophy of "Reduce, Re-use, and Recycle", making use of leftover material to reduce waste, and sending the rest to recycling factories. Unused Perspex material used for patterns is reformed into tools for its stores It has measures in place for both water and energy saving, with the company stating that, as of 2025, the factory saves 3 million liters of water per year, and uses up to 35% solar energy each year.

44% of Cape Union's in-house K-Way range of clothing and accessories is created using sustainable materials. Its K-Way sleeping bags are filled with REPREVE, a 100% recycled material made from plastic bottles that were destined for landfills and the ocean.

Through its K-Way Sewing School, Cape Union has an initiative to upskill machinists from the local community. New recruits take part in a year of training and learn from the ground up. They are taught where fabrics start, how to operate machines efficiently, and how to perform each garment process in Cape Union's factory.
