= Platō Coffee =

South African coffeehouse chain

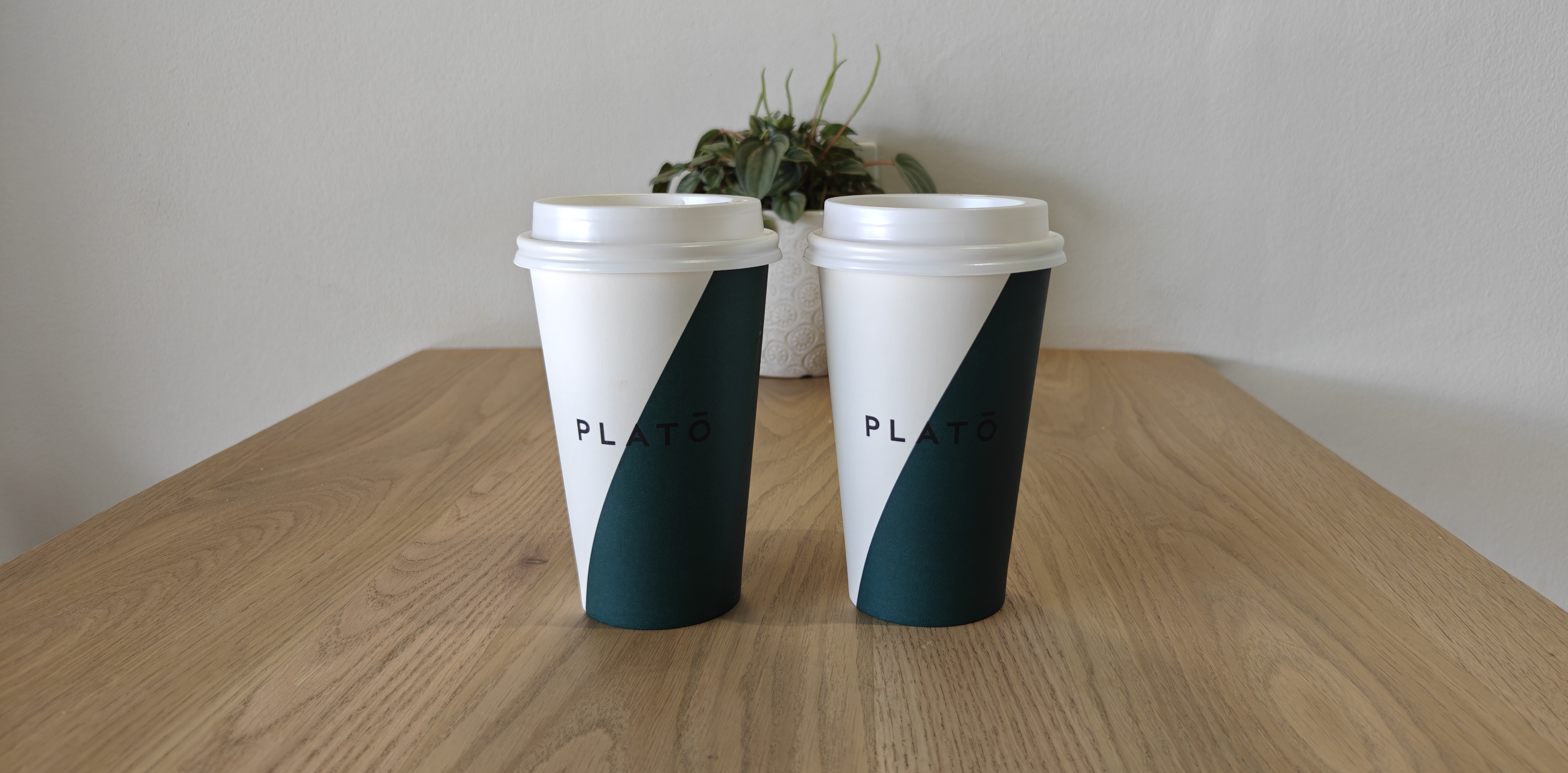
- Type: Private
- Industry: Coffeehouse chain
- Founded: 2019; 7 years ago
- Founder: Stephan and Petrus Bredell
- Headquarters: Pretoria, Gauteng, South Africa
- Number of locations: 150 (2026)
- Area served: Southern Africa
- Key people: Stephan Bredell (CEO)
- Products: Coffee beans Confections
- Services: Coffee training workshops
- Number of employees: 500+ (2025)
- Subsidiaries: BLΛNK
- Website: plato.coffee

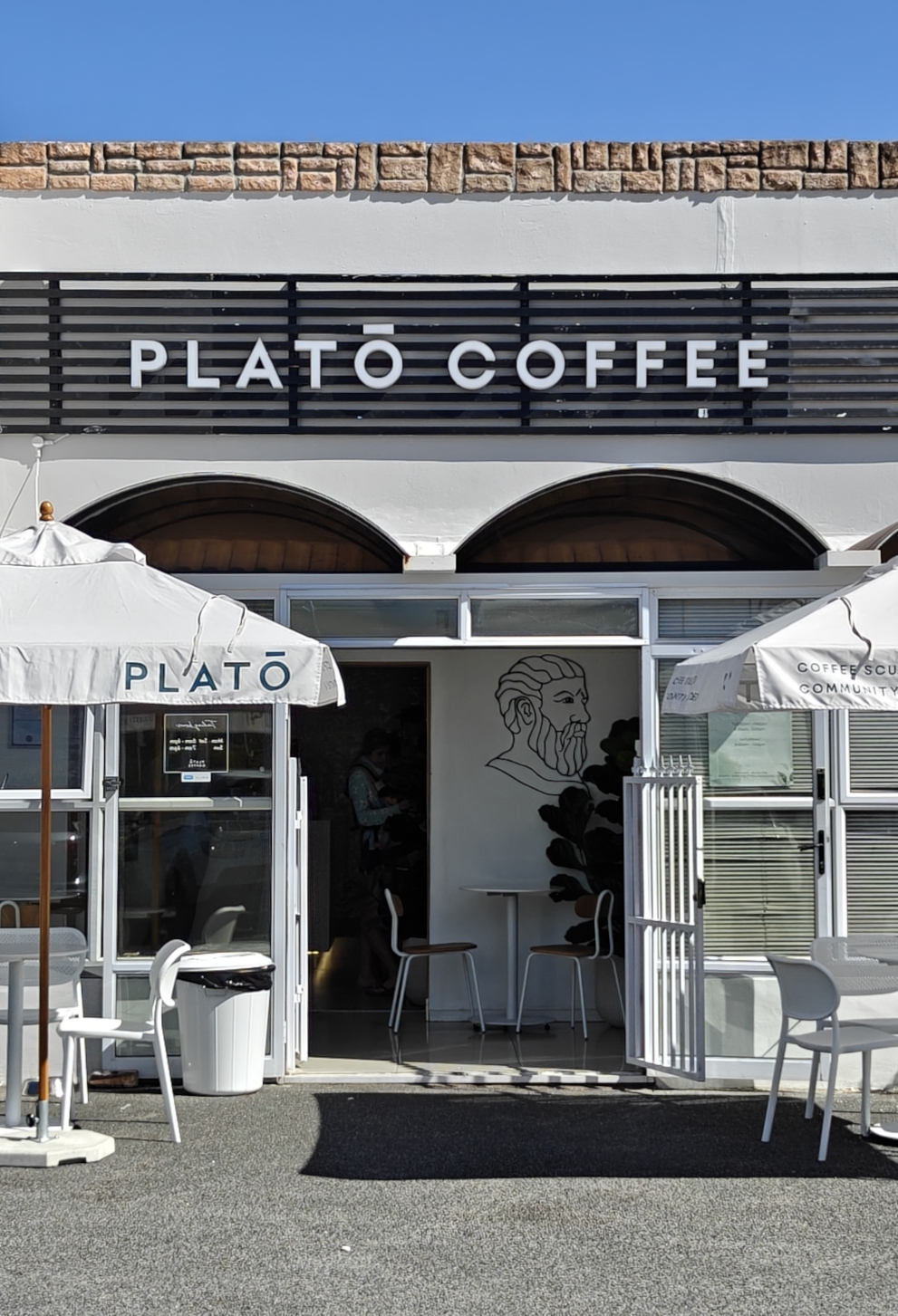
Platō Coffee store in Kirstenhof, Cape Town

Platō Coffee is a major South African coffeehouse chain. Founded in December 2019 and headquartered in Pretoria, Gauteng, the company operates 150 locations across Southern Africa and the United Kingdom, as of 2026. This makes Platō South Africa's fourth-largest coffeehouse chain by number of stores.

The company also operates Platō Academy, a barista and specialty coffee training center, in the Cape Town suburb of District Six. Established in late 2025, the center serves as the training hub for Platō's baristas and franchise partners, but is also open to the public for workshops and socializing.

== History ==
Platō was founded in 2019, by brothers Stephan and Petrus Bredell. Initially, the brothers sold coffee out of a shipping container in Centurion, Gauteng.

The company intentionally focused on opening stores in lifestyle centers and small towns, to achieve its goal of establishing good relationships with the communities in which it operates, and building a community around its coffee.

Platō also quickly discovered that the margins were far better on coffee than their food offerings. The company subsequently removed food from the menu in order to focus exclusively on coffee.

In 2022, Platō launched a franchise model, and opened its own roastery, called Blank Supplies (stylized as BLΛNK). Platō Co-founder Petrus subsequently moved to become Blank Supplies' CEO.

In 2024, the company had a total of 58 stores (20 corporate-owned and 38 franchised), and was continuing to expand. At the time, Platō confirmed it intended to establish stores outside of South Africa.

In August 2025, Platō reached a total of 100 stores and 500 employees. The company launched its own loyalty program in partnership with Cape Town-based rewards company Yoyo, using the latter's bank card-linked system. The loyalty system is enabled by Cape Town fintech Yoco's infrastructure, and the Platō arrangement was a first-of-its-kind customer loyalty partnership in South Africa. At the time, Platō announced plans to expand to 150 stores by the end of 2025.

Platō launched a barista and specialty coffee training center in District Six, Cape Town, in September 2025. The Platō Academy was established to train the company's own baristas and franchise partners, and also to serve as a meeting place for coffee enthusiasts and members of the public who want to take part in coffee workshops.

In November 2025, the company expanded outside South Africa, launching a store in neighboring Zimbabwe. Platō also announced plans to expand into Europe and the Middle East.

In April 2026, Platō expanded into Europe with the launch of its first store in the United Kingdom.

== Operations ==
As of July 2026, Platō operates over 150 locations across Southern Africa and the United Kingdom via a dual model of corporate and franchise-owned stores. Most of the company's coffeehouses are situated in its home country of South Africa. Johannesburg has the company's highest number of outlets, followed by Cape Town.

The company also operates Platō Academy, a barista and specialty coffee training center in Cape Town.

Some Platō outlets have extended hours, operating from 6AM to 6PM, to cater to clients arriving before or after work and school commutes.

== See also ==
- Coffee culture in Cape Town
