= Bootlegger Coffee Company =

Café franchise in South Africa

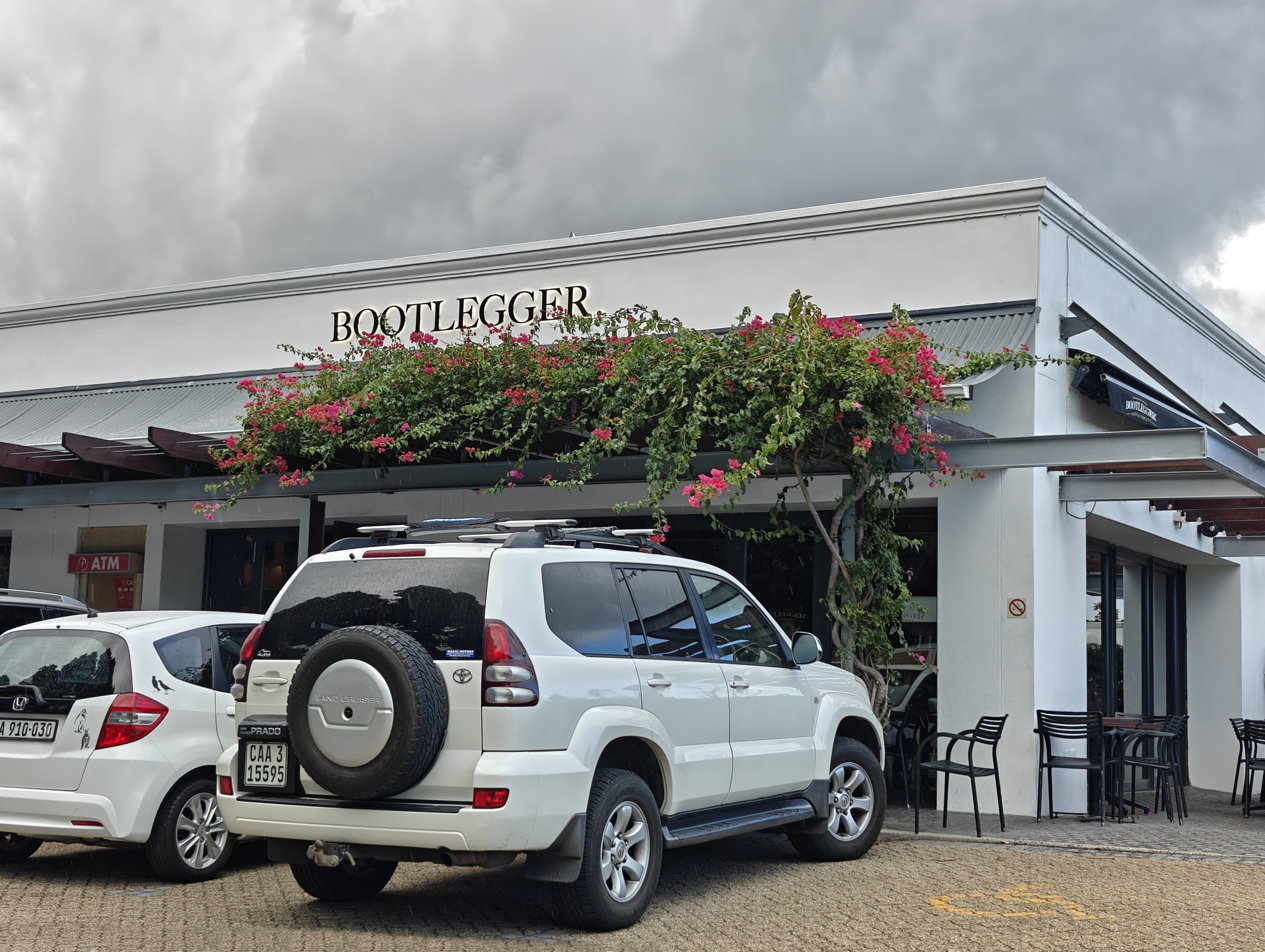
- Type: Private
- Industry: Coffeehouse chain
- Founded: 2013; 13 years ago, in Cape Town, South Africa
- Headquarters: Cape Town, South Africa
- Number of locations: 120+ (2026)
- Areas served: South Africa
- Products: Coffee beans, capsules, and equipment
- Services: Coffeehouses
- Website: bootlegger.coffee

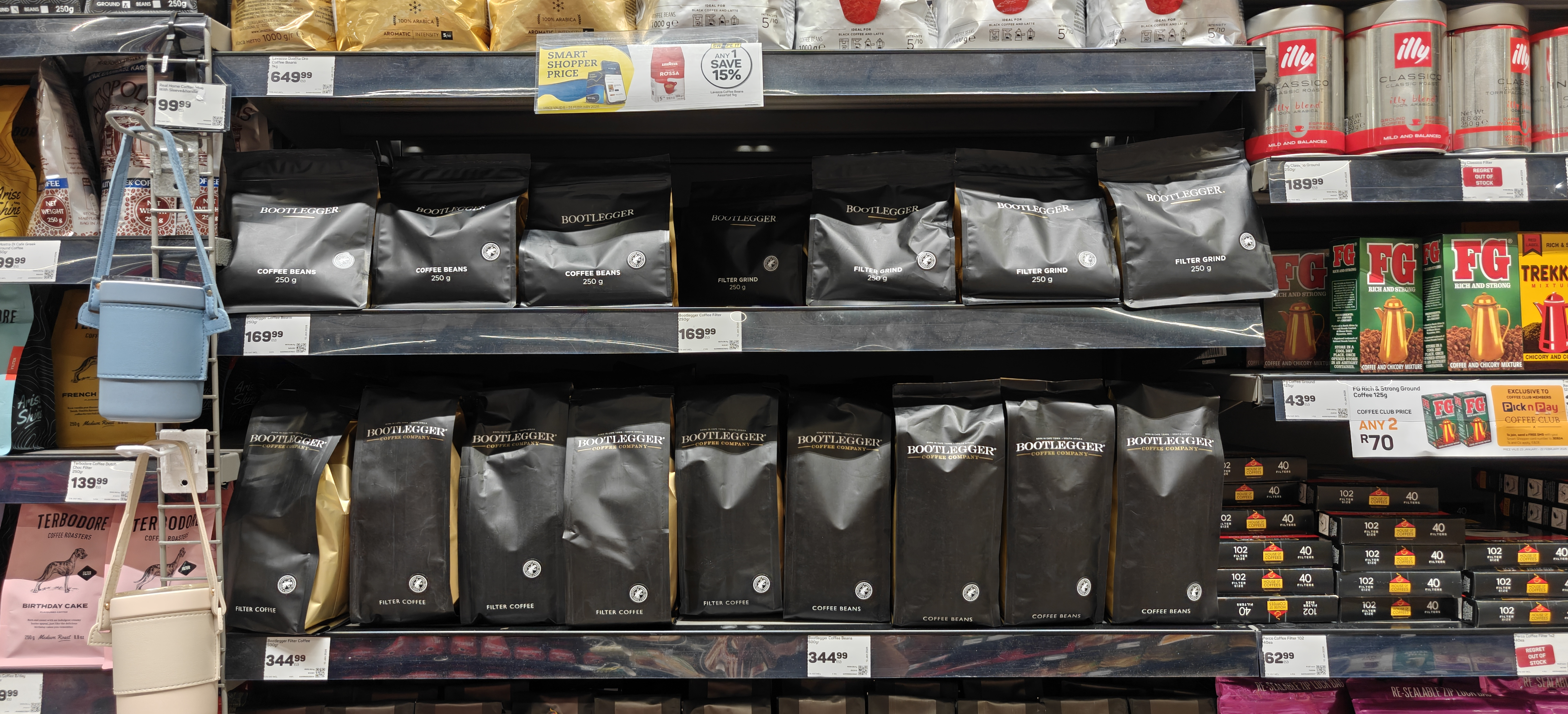
Bootlegger coffee beans and grounds in a PnP store in Cape Town

Bootlegger (officially Bootlegger Coffee Company) is a privately owned South African café franchise and supplier of beverage products, founded in 2013.

Headquartered in Cape Town, Bootlegger operates over 120 stores across five provinces in South Africa, with the majority of its stores located in Cape Town.

== History ==
Bootlegger was founded when it opened its first store in Sea Point, Cape Town, in 2013. The company was started by 3 friends - Pieter Bloem, and brothers De Waal and Antonie Basson. The friends opened the café chain as a result of not being able to find enough quality coffeehouses open early enough to enjoy during their morning run.

The first Bootlegger was a rebranding of an existing coffeehouse called Go Gos, which the trio bought and rebranded to the name Bootlegger, which was inspired by the spirit of 1920s America.

In 2017, Bootlegger opened its first BCG (Bootlegger Café and Grill) outlet in Constantia, Cape Town. The new format store was built to have a more sophisticated feel, and a menu created by chef Eric Bulpitt, who heads up FABER, a restaurant in Paarl. The first BCG took over the location of the old Greens restaurant in High Constantia.

Also in 2017, the company opened its first Bootlegger Coffee and Ice Cream Parlour, at Surfer's Corner, in Muizenberg, Cape Town.

In 2023, Bootlegger moved its Cape Town headquarters from Sea Point to Ndabeni. The new site was redeveloped into a mixed-use facility, including the company's headquarters, its coffee roasting facility, a flagship restaurant, and its sister company; Ou Meul's Central Bakery. The new building, called The Coffee Depot, also includes office and retail space for other companies.

In July 2025, Bootlegger announced its intention to grow to 200 stores by 2028.

In September 2025, Bootlegger announced a partnership to provide its beverages to South African airline FlySafair. As part of the strategy, all domestic passengers would be able to buy Bootlegger's Colombian FD Coffee; Cappuccino; Hot Chocolate; and Dilmah Ceylon and Rooibos Tea drinks on board FlySafair flights.

== Operations ==
As of 2026, Bootlegger owns over 120 stores, located across 5 South African provinces. The company operates as a franchise, offering two formats; a larger All Day Café and smaller XS Café.

The company also operates a grill in Constantia, and an ice cream parlour in Muizenberg, both in Cape Town.

Bootlegger sells a variety of coffee products, including beans and capsules under its own brand name. Its cafés also serve food throughout the day. The company also sells coffee equipment, such as grinders, kettles, espresso machines, french presses, and capsule machines, from brands including Sanremo, Bialetti, AeroPress, and Nuova Simonelli.

The company roasts its beans in-house, at its roastery in Woodstock, Cape Town. One of the largest micro-roasteries in South Africa, the facility produces between 350 and 400 tons of coffee per year. Its beans are sourced from Central Africa and South America.

== 2026 data exposure ==
In October 2026, Bootlegger Coffee Company was the subject of reports concerning a data security exposure after an internal operations dashboard, known as BOS, was found to expose business information and personal contact details without requiring authentication. South African technology publication MyBroadband reported that the application, hosted on Railway, displayed a login screen but delivered underlying datasets to unauthenticated visitors. The exposed information included financial and operational records, business performance data, and names and contact details associated with the company's 132 locations.

The incident attracted attention in the context of the company's adoption of artificial intelligence tools. Group CEO Ricky Ruthenberg had previously discussed his experimentation with AI-assisted software development, commonly referred to as vibe coding, and the introduction of Anthropic's Claude across the company's head office. MyBroadband and ITWeb subsequently examined the incident in connection with Bootlegger's AI adoption practices. However, the extent to which AI-generated code contributed to the affected application's development or security weaknesses was not independently established.

Responding to the reports, Ruthenberg confirmed that the affected application was a legacy version of BOS that had not been fully decommissioned following migration to a newer environment. Bootlegger stated that it became aware of the exposure on 15 October 2026 and took the application offline that day. The company acknowledged that the exposed information included business performance data, café development information, franchisee and operator contact details, and general managers' names and mobile numbers. It stated that the platform did not contain customer data and that its initial investigation found no evidence of unauthorised access to its core databases or business systems.

Bootlegger also announced plans to notify South Africa's Information Regulator under the Protection of Personal Information Act (POPIA) and contact affected individuals.

The incident also circulated internationally on social media, including through a post by International Cyber Digest on X.

The incident was subsequently discussed in international software engineering commentary. In November 2026, Rod Johnson, creator of the Spring Framework, referenced the Bootlegger exposure in his article Vibe Coding, Meet Reality, discussing the importance of professional software engineering practices and security oversight in AI-assisted development.

== Reception ==
In 2022, Bootlegger was voted first in the Best Coffee category of South African radio station Kfm's Best of the Cape Awards, for the second year in a row.

== See also ==
- Retailing in South Africa
