= Ottery, Cape Town =

Suburb of Cape Town, in Western Cape, South Africa

Ottery
- Interactive map of Ottery
- Coordinates: 34°00′53″S 18°30′16″E
- Country: South Africa
- Province: Western Cape
- Municipality: City of Cape Town
- Main Place: Cape Town

Government
  - Councillor: Montgomery Oliver (Ward 63) (DA); George March (Ward 66) (ID)

Area
  - Total: 1.99 km^{2} (0.77 sq mi)

Population (2011)
  - Total: 5,089
  - Density: 2,560/km^{2} (6,620/sq mi)

Racial makeup (2011)
  - Black African: 5.4%
  - Coloured: 66.3%
  - Indian/Asian: 3.8%
  - White: 12.2%
  - Other: 12.3%

First languages (2011)
  - English: 82.5%
  - Afrikaans: 12.8%
  - Xhosa: 2.2%
  - Other: 2.5%
- Time zone: UTC+2 (SAST)
- Postal code (street): 7808
- PO box: 7800
- Area code: 021

Ottery is a mixed-use, residential, commercial, and industrial suburb in Cape Town, South Africa, located on the eastern edge of the city's Southern Suburbs region.

The suburb's name was derived from an otter sanctuary that was opened in the area in the early 1900s. It was closed as the neighborhood rapidly expanded, later in the century.

== Geography ==
Ottery is bordered by Plumstead to the west; farmland in Philippi to the east; Kenilworth to the north west; and Ferness Estate, Ottery East, and Edward to the south.

The suburb is close to the M5 freeway - one of the city's two "M" freeway routes. Along each side of the neighborhood is a major transit route. Along its western border is a Metrorail train line, to the south is Ottery Road, to the north is Wetton Road, and to the east is New Strandfontein Road.

Ottery is located approximately 20 km from Cape Town CBD, and around 15 km from the False Bay coast in Muizenberg.

A considerable amount of traffic travels along the southern border of the suburb, along Ottery Road, and the road is speed-restricted by signage and traffic cameras.

The north-east of Ottery comprises mainly detached homes. The middle of the suburb is a combination of detached houses, and a large vlei (marshland) that is undeveloped, and takes up almost a quarter of the suburb's land. Modern subsidized housing, in the form of apartment blocks, has been built opposite the vlei.

== Housing ==
The residential parts of Ottery consist mainly of detached homes, but the suburb does have some low-rise apartment buildings.

Ottery is a lower-middle-income neighborhood, and as of June 2025, the average cost of a detached home in the area was R2.24 million.

== Transport ==
Just outside the suburb is the Metrorail Ottery Train Station, which connects Heathfield to Cape Town CBD, via Athlone. The Ottery station was completed on 1 February 1904. The line was built for private use and was acquired as government property on 1 July 1908.

Golden Arrow buses traverse the neighborhood as part of the service's Wynberg to Khayelitsha route. Minibus taxis travel through Ottery along Ottery Road, en route to Wynberg from Lotus River and Mitchells Plain.

== Education ==
Ottery is home to numerous educational institutions, at various NQF levels, including:

=== Schools ===
- Christel House School
- The Oracle Academy High School
- Kids Kampus Pre School
- Ferndale Primary
- Junior College
- Battswood Primary School

=== Higher Education ===
- Ottery School of Industries

== Medical ==
The Good Hope Medical Centre is situated in Ottery.

== Public Service ==
Hillstar Traffic Department is based in Ottery, and is one of Cape Town's major traffic control, testing, and licensing centers.

The neighborhood also houses Ottery Library; part of the City of Cape Town Public Library system.

The Youngsfield Military Base is located in Ottery, along a stretch of Ottery Road. Every March, Youngsfield hosts the Cape Argus Junior Cycle Tour.

== Governance ==
Ottery is located within Ward 66, and as of June 2025, was represented by Ward Councilor William Akim, of the Democratic Alliance party.

== Commerce ==
Ottery is home to numerous blocks of retail outlets and manufacturing units, and around half of its land area is dedicated to these commercial and industrial operations.

To the north-west is the Hillstar Traffic Department, and a number of industrial units. To the south-east is China Town Ottery, the Ottery Hyper shopping center (with a large Pick n Pay), and a large Makro warehouse store.
