= Makro (South Africa) =

South African retail chain

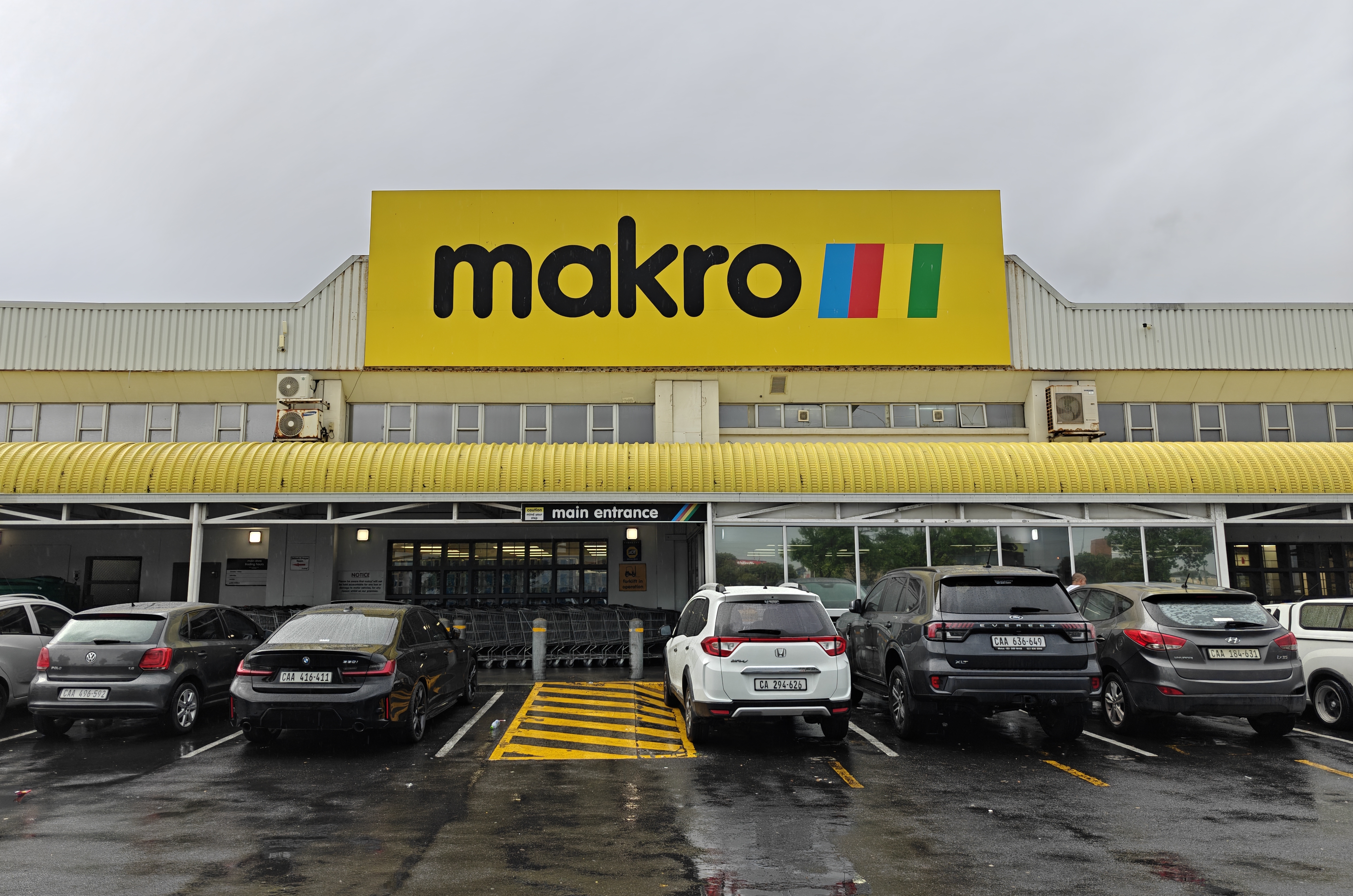
- The entrance to a Makro store in Ottery, Cape Town
- Type: Subsidiary
- Industry: Retail
- Founded: 1971; 55 years ago
- Headquarters: Sandton, Gauteng, South Africa
- Number of locations: 46 (2025)
- Areas served: South Africa
- Key people: Jonathan Molapo (CEO of parent company Massmart)
- Services: Warehouse club
- Revenue: ▲ R28.3 billion (2021)
- Parent: Massmart
- Website: makro.co.za

Makro (stylized as makro) is a South African warehouse club retail chain. Owned by local retail holding company Massmart, it operates under the Dutch Makro brand name.

Headquartered in Sandton, Gauteng, the company has been operating since 1971. In 2026, Makro had a total of 46 locations across SA.

== History ==
Makro South Africa was established in 1971, in Germiston, South Africa. By 1989, the group had 5 stores in the country.

In 1988, Mark Lamberti was recruited by former South African retail group, Wooltru, to become the Managing Director of Makro. During Lamberti's stewardship, Makro acquired 15 entities, and opened over 100 new stores.

Massmart, Makro's current parent company in South Africa, was established in 1990, when the former acquired 6 existing Makro stores.

In 2006, Deloitte ranked Makro's parent company, Massmart, as the 140th largest retailer worldwide, and the 15th fastest growing, out of the 250 in the list.

In May 2011, US-based retailer Walmart bought a 51% share in Massmart, for around R17 billion (~ US$2.54 billion), after receiving approval from the South African Competition Tribunal. Then, in November 2020, Walmart finalized the acquisition of the remaining shares, making Massmart a wholly owned subsidiary of Walmart. Then-MD Mark Lamberti was invited to remain at the company, as an independent non-executive Chairman.

Makro launched its standalone shopping app in July 2022.

In 2023, The company launched Makro Business, a website dedicated to selling to South African businesses, in an attempt to expand its customer base in the country.

In 2023, a South African news outlet compared the price of a basket of groceries comprising 9 commonly-bought items, and found that out of 8 major South African retailers, Makro had the lowest price. Makro was just over 10% cheaper than the most expensive retailer in the comparison.

Also in 2023, Makro switched to using Walmart's Global Integrated Fulfillment (GIF) Store Assist software at all Makro stores.

In similar comparative research conducted in 2024 by a different South African news outlet, across 6 major South African grocery retailers, Makro was ranked as the most affordable chain on average. The same results were found in 2025, when the news outlet ran the study again.

Makro's parent company, Massmart, announced plans in April 2024 to replace 4 Game stores (a sister retailer) inside shopping malls with small format (3,000 sqm) Makro stores, as part of a test to gauge consumer response. The company stated that this would make Makro stores more accessible to a wider market. Massmart stated that due to the challenge of finding suitable retail space inside malls for the new Makro stores, converting Game stores made sense. The first conversion was set to be the store in East Point, a shopping center in Boksburg, with a scheduled opening in 2025.

== Operations ==
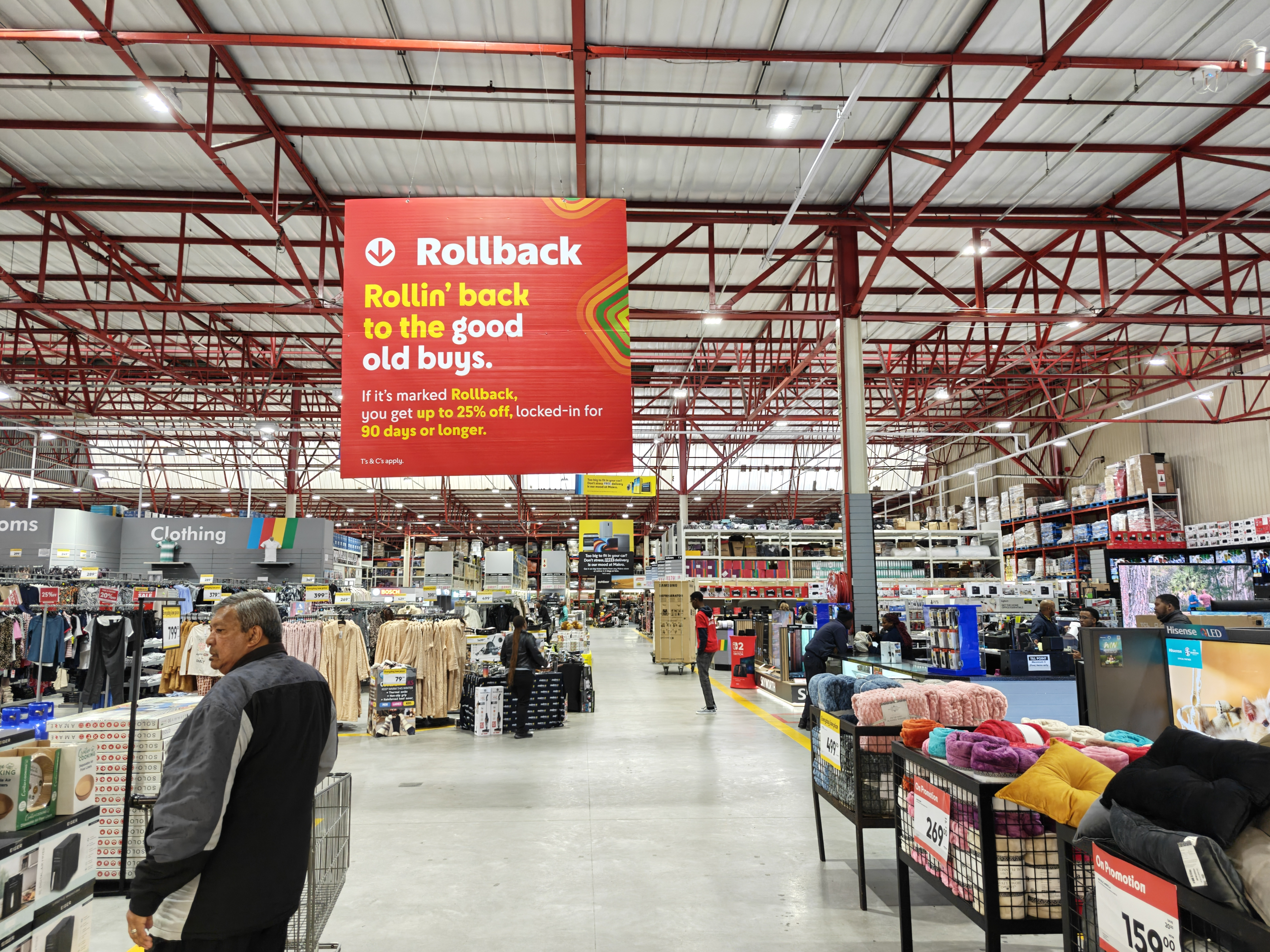
The interior of a Makro store in Ottery, Cape Town

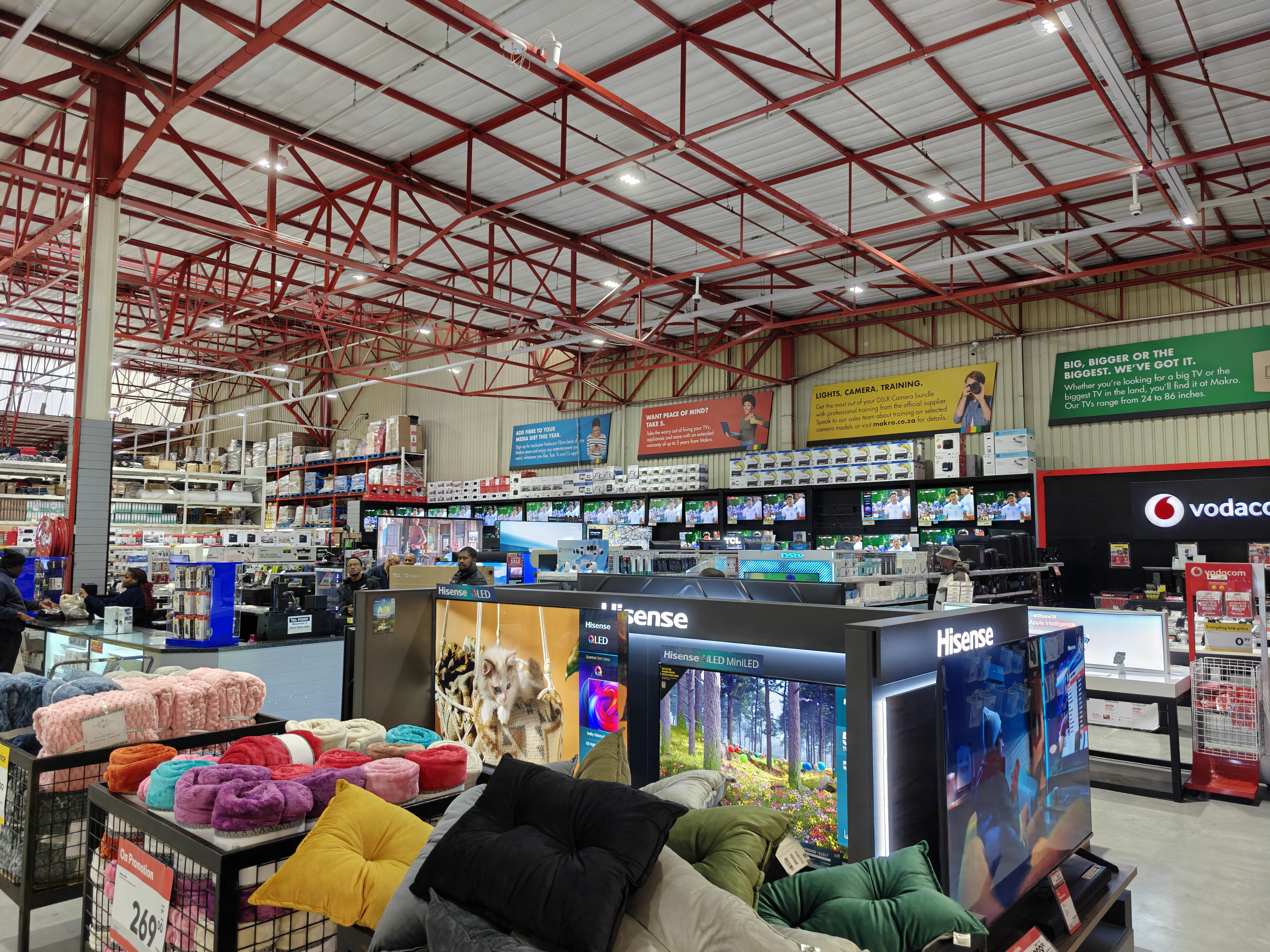
Merchandise inside a Makro store

The company has 46 stores, located across South Africa. The total includes 23 Makro (general warehouse) stores and 23 Makro Liquor stores. It also operates an online store, which it launched in 2014.

The retail chain is part of Massmart's Wholesale division.

Makro uses Massmart's centralized distribution center system, whereby shared distribution centers serve stores across the entire group's network.

The retailer sells, among other things, electronics, major appliances, camping gear, sports equipment, homeware, food, clothing, and alcohol.

Being a warehouse club, Makro's stores are all large format locations, and it sells a number of products in bulk. In South Africa, the chain is frequented by those who operate small convenience stores, and buy items in bulk to resell to their local communities.

Makro operates a card-based purchase system, whereby shoppers need to get a free Makro card in order to make any purchases at the store or online.

== Controversy ==
In December 2022, after a dispute with Makro's parent company Massmart, over wage increases, the South African Commercial, Catering and Allied Workers Union (SACCAWU) announced that its members would go on strike for 2 days. The union was asking for, among other things, a minimum wage of R8,000 (~ US$437) per month, and a R100 (~ US$5) uniform budget.

Makro's representatives met with the union at the CCMA, and asked SACCAWU to give them time to consider a lower request. The union was then asked for even more time. After agreeing, Makro's parent company put out a public announcement that they believed the union did not intend to find a resolution, which SACCAWU disputed, stating that Makro's parent company was negotiating in bad faith, and thus, industrial action was required. As a result, as per South African legal requirements, the union gave the group 48 hours of notice that its members would be going on strike to demonstrate their dissatisfaction with the group's pay policies.

Makro then dismissed 600 employees, and placed a further 200 employees on suspension because of the strike, claiming that it was illegal. SACCAWU called this justification misleading. UNI Global Union and the UNI Africa Massmart Alliance of trade unions publicly requested that Massmart (Makro's parent company) ceased its anti-union actions, and reinstated the 600 employees. They further stated that SACCAWU's request was fair. SACCAWU stated that Makro's actions were unprecedented in the history of South African labor relations, and that the union would not be deterred from standing up for its members' employment rights.

After 14 months, a wage deal was agreed upon by Makro and SACCAWU. The multi-year agreement, facilitated through a CCMA Section 150 intervention, would cover the 2022 through 2025 financial years. It would see a 4.5% increase for the first financial year, a 5% increase for the second, and a 5% increase for the third, and increased pay would be backdated to 1 April 2022. The parties also agreed to conduct a relationship-building exercise by no later than 31 July 2024, to explore and consider centralized bargaining for the different brands or subsidiaries of Massmart, such as Builders Warehouse, Game, Masscash, and Makro. It was also agreed that the process would be expedited, and a solution would be found for the 600 dismissed employees.

After the dispute was resolved, SACCAWU stated that Makro had, for a considerable amount of time during the negotiations, used unfair tactics, such as sticking to a 0% wage increase. SACCAWU thanked fellow South African union COSATU, Formations of the Tripartite Alliance, various community members, and customers, for their support during the strike.

In May 2025, reports of Makro selling items with incorrect descriptions online occurred, with the store having allowed third party sellers to list numerous TVs on its website that had false information, such as being listed as "Full HD" when in fact the electronics had far lower resolutions, or being listed with unsubstantiated claims of refresh rates higher than what existed at the time in the consumer electronics market. Makro did not respond to a major South African media outlet reaching out to them for comment on the matter.

== Corporate social responsibility ==
Numerous Makro stores feature solar photovoltaic (PV) systems, installed on top of covers to provide shade for parked cars. These panels produce 4.4 million kWh of electricity per year, and feed renewable power directly into the stores, to reduce electricity bills. The systems were acquired by Nesa Investment Holdings in September 2019.

In 2024, Makro partnered with Desco Electronic Recyclers and ERO to places recycling bins in easily accessible locations at Makro stores, to make it convenient for customers to drop off their electronic waste (e-waste). This is then recycled off-site, instead of ending up in landfills. The project also supports South African job creation, by partnering with local recycling facilities.

== See also ==
- Retailing in South Africa
- Warehouse club
