= Massmart =

South African retail company

Massmart Holdings Limited
- Type: Subsidiary
- Industry: Retail
- Founded: 1980; 46 years ago
- Founder: Mark Lamberti
- Headquarters: Sandton, South Africa
- Number of locations: 318 (2026)
- Area served: Africa
- Products: Food, Liquor, General merchandise, Home Improvement
- Brands: Makro; Game; Builders Warehouse; CBW; Jumbo; Shield; Walmart SA
- Revenue: ▲ R91.56 billion (2016)
- Operating income: ▲ R2.60 billion (2016)
- Net income: ▲ R1.32 billion (2016)
- Total assets: ▲ R31.88 billion (2016)
- Total equity: ▲ R6.18 billion (2016)
- Number of employees: ~ 45,000 (2025)
- Parent: Walmart (since 2022)
- Subsidiaries: Masstores; Massmart Retail; Massmart Wholesale
- Website: www.massmart.co.za

Massmart, officially Massmart Holdings Limited, is a South African retail company that owns and operates multiple major local chains, including Game, Makro, Builders Warehouse, and CBW. Massmart is the second-largest distributor of consumer goods in Africa, the largest retailer of general merchandise, liquor and home improvement equipment and wholesaler of basic foods.

In 2026, Massmart operated through three distinct legal entities, and had a total of 318 stores across all of its brands. Of these, 285 (around 90%) were located in South Africa, with the remaining 33 spread across seven other African countries.

Massmart is headquartered in Sandton, Gauteng, and has been wholly owned by US retail company Walmart since 2022.

== History ==
Massmart was founded in 1990, beginning with the acquisition of six Makro stores.

In July 2000, the company listed on the JSE Limited, South Africa's largest stock exchange.

In November 2010, US retail company Walmart made a bid to acquire a majority shareholding (51%) in Massmart. At the time, the offer was valued at approximately R17 billion.

On 18 January 2011, Massmart shareholders voted in favour of Walmart's offer of R148 per share. South Africa's Competition Tribunal gave its approval of the acquisition of 51% of the firm in May 2011. Shortly thereafter, in June 2011, Walmart completed the purchase of 51% of the company's stock.

In 2011, the South African Government, through the Department of Economic Development, and the Department of Trade and Industry, lodged an appeal to the decision of the Competition Tribunal's decision to allow the merger with minimal conditions. This followed a similar, earlier appeal filed by local labor union SACCAWU.

In March 2012, the appeals court dismissed the case by the governmental ministries, but acknowledged that there were legitimate concerns about the effect of the deal on small producers and employment. The appeals court decision effectively put an end to the legal challenges to the merger.

In August 2022, Walmart made an offer to acquire the remaining non-controlling shares of Massmart, and by the end of November the scheme had been finalized, making Massmart a wholly owned subsidiary of Walmart. That same month, Massmart's delisting from the JSE was finalized.

== Structure ==
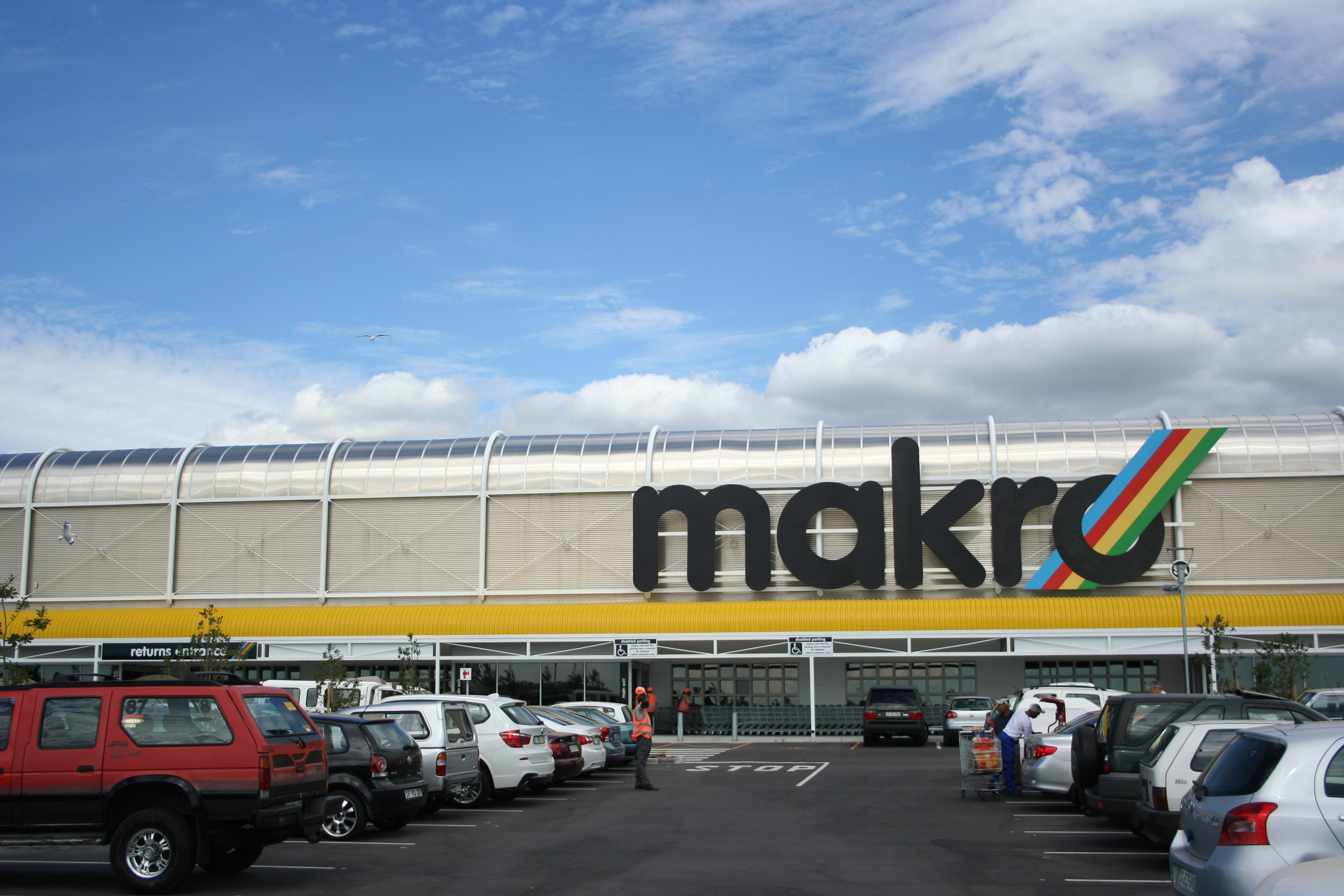
A Makro store, showing the company's old branding, in Milnerton, Cape Town

As of 2026, Massmart Holdings operates through three subsidiaries – Masstores, Massmart Retail, and Massmart Wholesale. The group's operating divisions are as follows:

- Retail
  - Builders
    - Builders Warehouse
    - Builders Express
    - Builders Trade Depot
    - Builders Superstore
  - Game
  - Walmart South Africa
- Wholesale
  - Makro
  - Cash & Carry
    - CBW
    - Jumbo Cash & Carry
    - Sunshine
    - Trident
    - Eureka
    - Saverite
  - Shield
- Other operations
  - Massmart Services
  - Massmart Transport Services
  - OneCart
  - Wumdrop ZA
