= Builders Warehouse =

South African home improvement retail chain

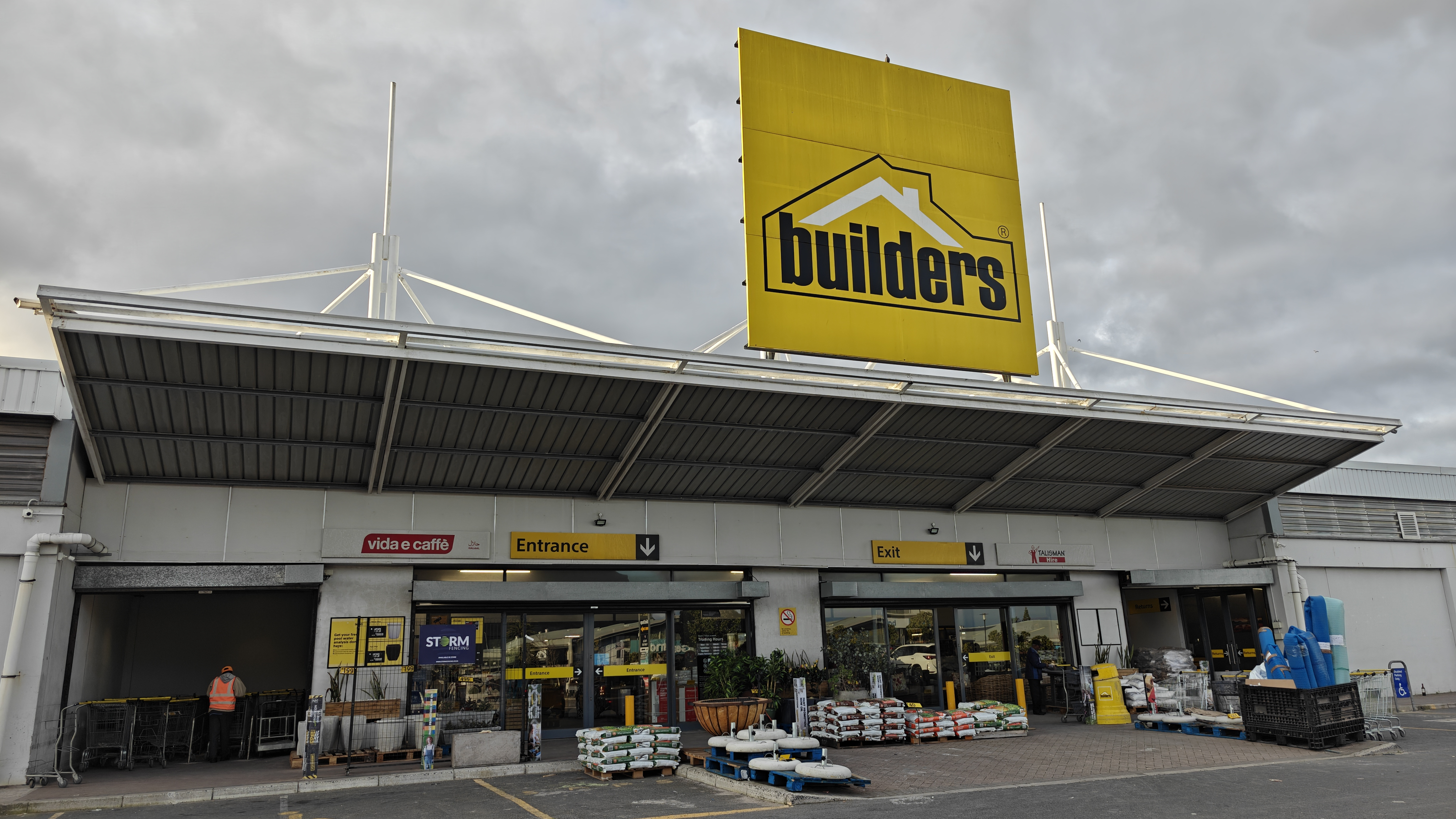
- The entrance to a Builders Warehouse store in Kirstenhof, Cape Town
- Type: Subsidiary
- Industry: Retail
- Founded: 2003; 23 years ago
- Headquarters: Sandton, Gauteng, South Africa
- Number of locations: 117 (2025)
- Area served: Southern Africa; East Africa
- Key people: Llewellyn Walters (CEO)
- Products: Construction equipment Building materials Home improvement supplies Plants
- Operating income: R1.18 billion (2022)
- Owner: Massmart
- Website: www.builders.co.za

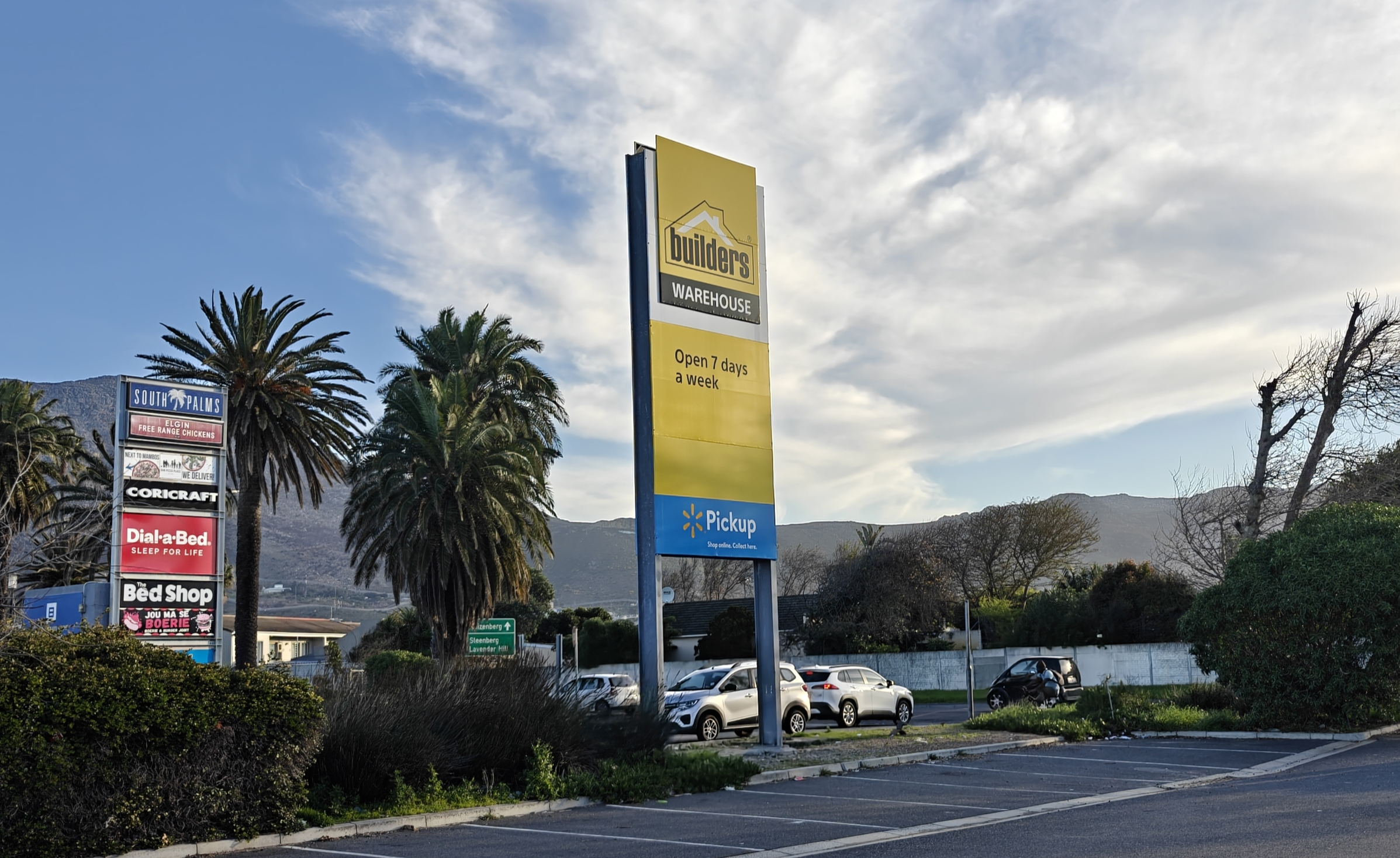
Builders Warehouse signage Cape Town

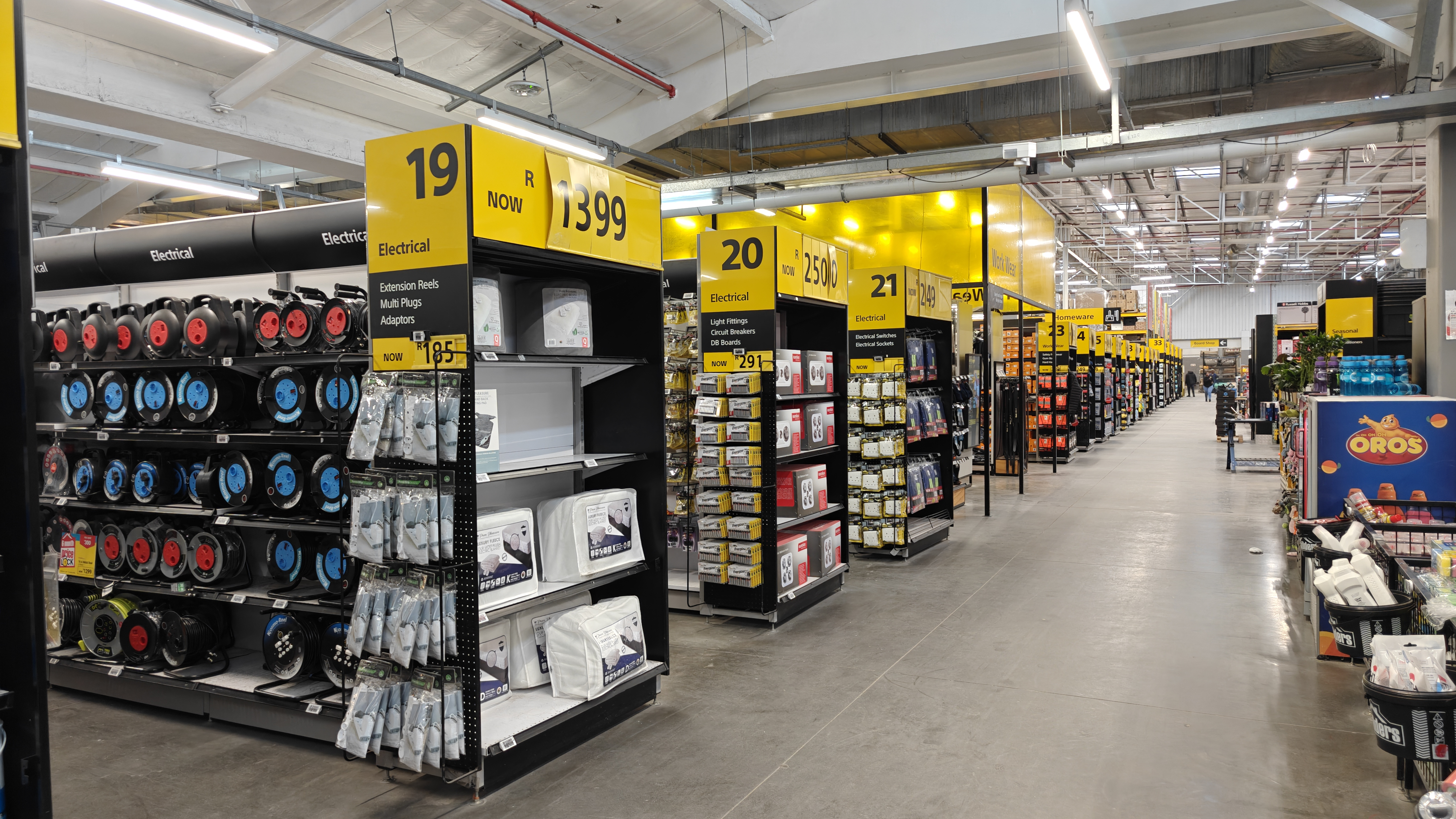
Aisles near the entrance of a Builders Warehouse store in Kirstenhof, Cape Town

Builders Warehouse (commonly referred to as Builders in South Africa), is a South African construction equipment and home improvement retail chain.

Founded in 2003 and headquartered in Sandton, Gauteng, Builders is owned by South African retail holding company Massmart.

Builders operates various different store formats, including Builders Warehouse, Builders Express (small-format stores), Builders Trade Depot (focused specifically on construction entrepreneurs), and Builders Superstore.

In 2025, Builders operated a total of 117 locations in four African countries, across all of its store formats.

== History ==
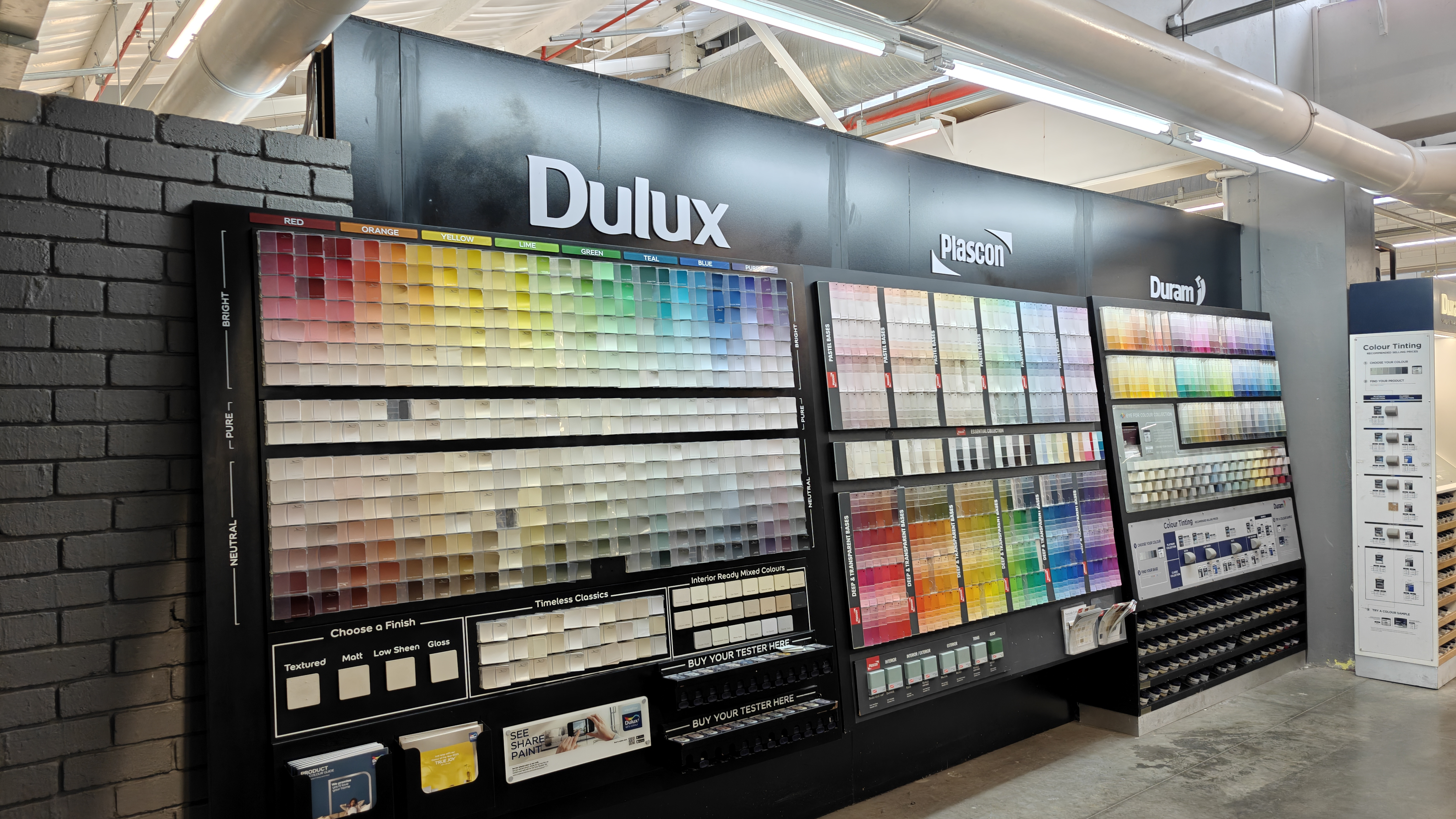
Builders Warehouse paint display

Massmart began its acquisitions of the Builders brand when it acquired five Builders Warehouse stores operating in Johannesburg and Pretoria, in 2003.

In May 2011, Walmart acquired 51% of parent company Massmart Group's stock, at a value of R17 million (approximately US$2.54 billion or £1.54 billion), after receiving regulatory approval from the South African Competition Tribunal. By November 2020, Walmart had finalized the purchase of the remaining 49% of shares, making Massmart a wholly owned subsidiary of Walmart.

In 2017, the company revealed its first store that is in part powered by renewable energy. Located in Northriding, Johannesburg, the store uses 400 roof-mounted photovoltaic panels to provide 16% of its annual energy consumption. According to Massmart Group's sustainability manager Alex Haw, serves to reduce the company's greenhouse gas emissions.

In 2019, Builders Warehouse revealed a new store prototype in Boksburg, Gauteng, offering, among other things, 3D printing; flatpack furniture; and a smart home hub for digital, in-store shopping and retrieving product information. The store was to serve as a benchmark for all future new store builds and renovations.

== Operations ==
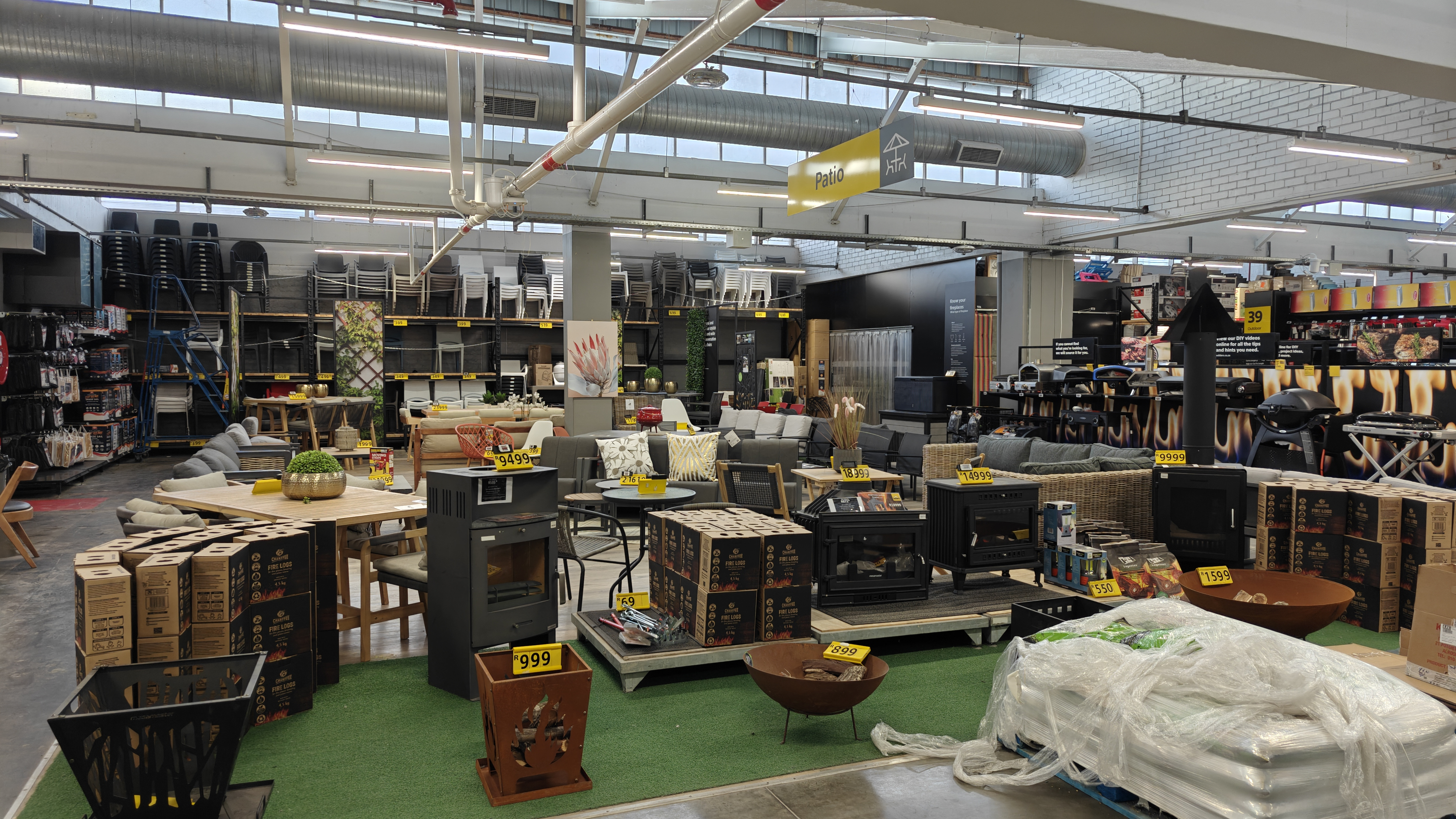
Builders Warehouse patio section

Builders Warehouse operates 117 stores in 4 countries across Southern and East Africa; South Africa, Botswana, Mozambique, and Zambia. It also provides an online shopping service.

Some Builders Warehouse stores offer services such as tool hire, pool water analysis, and car key programming, and have partnered with local coffee chain Vida e Caffè.
