= List of companies based in Cape Town =

This is a list of notable companies headquartered in the Cape Town metro area.

(In terms of notability, included companies have, at a minimum, an active Wiki page that is not in draft format, is not a stub, is not under review for major issues, and is not pending deletion. Companies that no longer exist are not included in the list. Industries are divided into sections and alphabetized. Tables within each industry section are alphabetized).

== Architecture ==
Company	Founded	Type	Area served	Ref
VDMMA	1991; 35 years ago	Private	Worldwide	
Total: 1				

== Automotive ==
Company	Founded	Type	Area served	Ref
GetWorth	2017; 9 years ago	Private	South Africa	
Total: 1				

== Biotech and pharmaceuticals ==
Company	Founded	Type	Area served	Ref
Afrigen	2014; 12 years ago	Private	Worldwide	
Total: 1				

== Coffeehouses and coffee production ==
Company	Founded	Type	Area served	Ref
Bootlegger	2013; 13 years ago	Private	South Africa	
Seattle	1993; 33 years ago	Private	Southern Africa	
Vida	2001; 25 years ago	Private	Africa	
WCafe	-	Division	Southern Africa	
Total: 4				

== Education ==
Company	Founded	Type	Area served	Ref
Curro	1998; 28 years ago	Public	South Africa	
Stadio	2017; 9 years ago	Public	South Africa	
Total: 2				

== Energy and petroleum ==
Company	Founded	Type	Area served	Ref
Anthem	2015; 11 years ago	Private	South Africa	
Astron Energy	2019; 7 years ago	Subsidiary	Southern Africa	
Charge	2021; 5 years ago	Private	South Africa	
Engen	1881; 145 years ago	Subsidiary	Africa	
EXSA	2003; 23 years ago	Private	South Africa	
PetroSA	2002; 24 years ago	State-owned enterprise	South Africa	
Rubicon	1986; 40 years ago	Private	Africa and United Kingdom	
SOLA Group	2008; 18 years ago	Private	Africa	
Total: 8				

== Film, television, and gaming ==
Company	Founded	Type	Area served	Ref
Boing	2009; 17 years ago	Subsidiary	Africa	
e.tv	1998; 28 years ago	Private	South Africa	
Free Lives	2012; 14 years ago	Private	Worldwide	
Penguin Films	1996; 30 years ago	Private	South Africa	
Rogue Star Films	2001; 25 years ago	Private	South Africa	
Sunrise Productions	1989; 37 years ago	Private	South Africa	
Triggerfish	1996; 30 years ago	Private	Worldwide	
Total: 7				

== Financial services ==
Company	Founded	Type	Area served	Ref
Allan Gray	1973; 53 years ago	Private	Worldwide	
Cape Town Stock Exchange	2021; 5 years ago	Stock exchange	South Africa	
Coronation	1993; 33 years ago	Public	Worldwide	
10X Investments	2014; 12 years ago	Private	South Africa	
Ninety One	1991; 35 years ago	Public	Worldwide	
OM Bank	2024; 2 years ago	Subsidiary	South Africa	
Sanlam	1918; 108 years ago	Public	Worldwide	
Santam	1918; 108 years ago	Public	South Africa	
Stitch Money	2019; 7 years ago	Private	South Africa	
Yoco	2013; 13 years ago	Private	South Africa	
Total: 10				

== Healthcare ==
Company	Founded	Type	Area served	Ref
Melomed	1989; 37 years ago	Private	South Africa	
Total: 1				

== Manufacturing ==
Company	Founded	Type	Area served	Ref
Pioneer Foods	1997; 29 years ago	Subsidiary	South Africa	
Total: 1				

== Media and publishing ==
Company	Founded	Type	Area served	Ref
African News Agency	2015; 11 years ago	Private	Africa	
Media24	1915; 111 years ago	Subsidiary	Africa	
Modjaji Books	2007; 19 years ago	Private	South Africa	
Total: 3				

== Nonprofits ==
Company	Founded	Type	Area served	Ref
Cape Town Tourism	2004; 22 years ago	Nonprofit	Cape Town	
Open Secrets	2017; 9 years ago	Nonprofit	South Africa	
Total: 2				

== Real estate ==
Company	Founded	Type	Area served	Ref
Pam Golding Properties	1976; 50 years ago	Private	Worldwide	
Total: 1				

== Restaurants and takeout ==
Company	Founded	Type	Area served	Ref
Kauai	1996; 30 years ago	Private	South Africa	
Knead	2006; 20 years ago	Private	South Africa	
Spur	1967; 59 years ago	Public	South Africa	
Total: 3				

== Retail ==
Company	Founded	Type	Area served	Ref
Absolute Pets	2005; 21 years ago	Private	South Africa	
Ackermans	1916; 110 years ago	Subsidiary	Southern Africa	
Cape Union Mart	1933; 93 years ago	Private	South Africa	
Checkers	1956; 70 years ago	Subsidiary	Southern Africa	
Clicks	1968; 58 years ago	Public	Southern Africa	
FreshStop	2013; 13 years ago	Subsidiary	South Africa	
Naartjie	1989; 37 years ago	Private	South Africa	
PEP	1965; 61 years ago	Subsidiary	Southern Africa	
Petshop Science	2010; 16 years ago	Private	South Africa	
Pick n Pay	1967; 59 years ago	Public	Southern Africa	
Shoprite	1979; 47 years ago	Public	Africa	
Sorbet	2005; 21 years ago	Subsidiary	South Africa	
Stodels	1962; 64 years ago	Private	Western Cape	
Takealot	2011; 15 years ago	Subsidiary	South Africa	
TFG	1924; 102 years ago	Public	Worldwide	
Truworths	1917; 109 years ago	Public	Africa	
Woolworths	1931; 95 years ago	Public	Southern Hemisphere	
Yuppiechef	2006; 20 years ago	Subsidiary	South Africa	
Total: 18				

== Tech ==
Company	Founded	Type	Area served	Ref
Cognician	1999; 27 years ago	Private	Worldwide	
Sweepsouth	2014; 12 years ago	Private	South Africa	
Xneelo	1999; 27 years ago	Private	Worldwide	
Total: 3				

== Telecoms and internet ==
Company	Founded	Type	Area served	Ref
MWEB	1997; 29 years ago	Subsidiary	South Africa	
Rain	2016; 10 years ago	Private	South Africa	
Total: 2				

== Tourism, aviation, and transport ==
Company	Founded	Type	Area served	Ref
Civair	1994; 32 years ago	Private	South Africa	
Global Load Control	2005; 21 years ago	Private	Worldwide	
Golden Arrow	1861; 165 years ago	Private	Cape Town	
LIFT	2020; 6 years ago	Private	South Africa	
Travelstart	1999; 27 years ago	Private	Africa	
Total: 5				

== Venture capital and investment holding ==
Company	Founded	Type	Area served	Ref
Hosken Consolidated Investments	1997; 29 years ago	Public	South Africa	
Naspers	1915; 111 years ago	Public	Worldwide	
Pepkor	1965; 61 years ago	Public	Africa	
Sekunjalo Investments	1997; 29 years ago	Public	South Africa	
Total: 4				

== Wellness and beauty ==
Company	Founded	Type	Area served	Ref
Sorbet	2005; 21 years ago	Subsidiary	South Africa	
Total: 1				
