= COVID-19 vaccination in Africa =

Immunisation programme against COVID-19 in Africa

- COVID-19 vaccine distribution in Africa
- Cause: COVID-19 pandemic in Africa

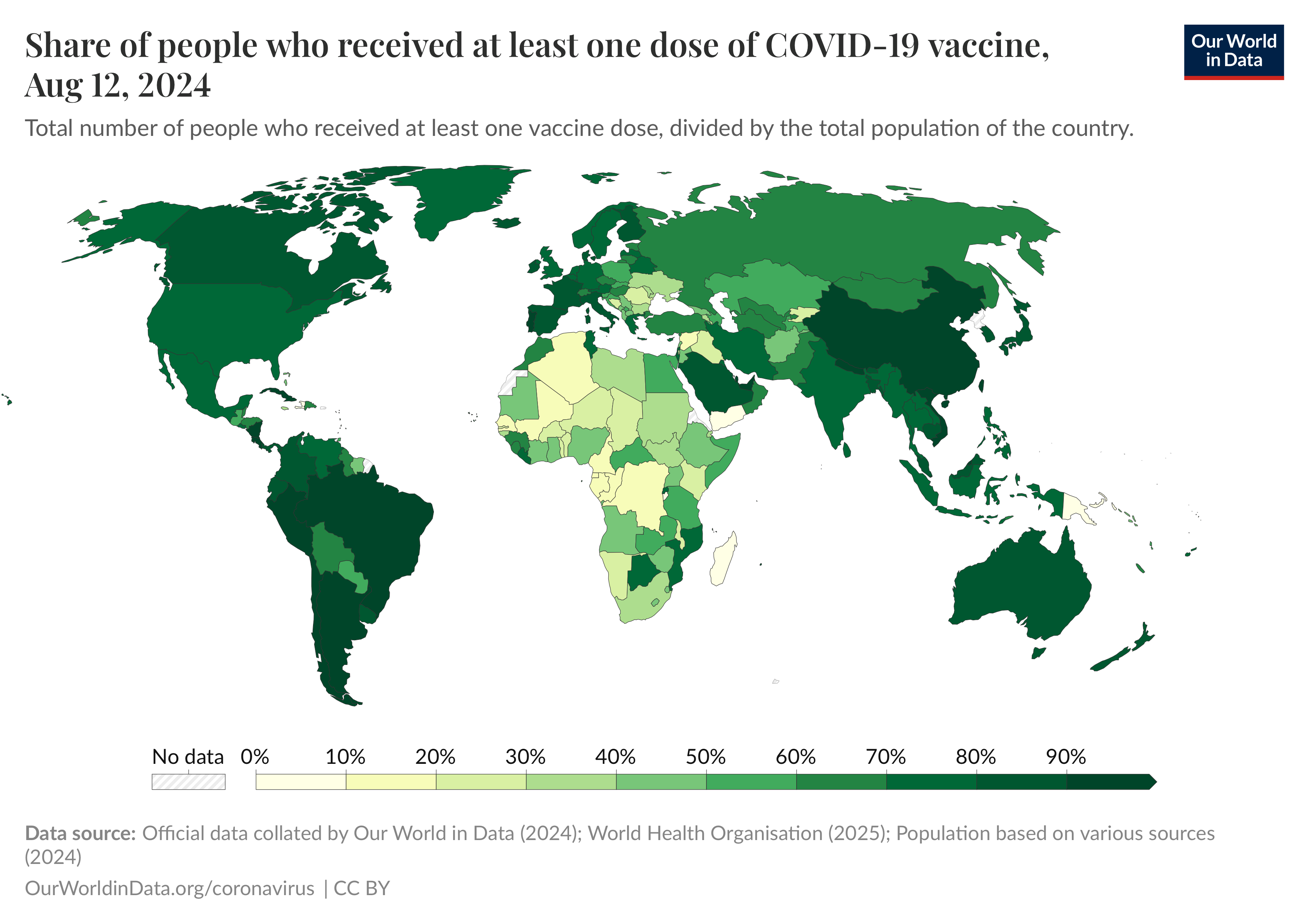
Share of people who received at least one dose of COVID-19 vaccine in the world

COVID-19 vaccination programs are ongoing in the majority countries and territories in Africa, with 51 of 54 African countries having launched vaccination programs by July 2021. As of October 2023, 51.8% of the continent's population is fully vaccinated with over 1084.5 million doses administered.

== Starting vaccine programs in Africa ==
As vaccine programs began, the World Health Organization predicted in June 2021 that 47 of Africa's 54 nations would fall short of the aim of vaccinating 10% of their people by September 2021. At that time, Africa accounted for fewer than 1% of worldwide vaccine doses delivered, and by early 2022, Africa received in total less than 2% of the 3 billion vaccination doses provided globally.

On 15 July 2021, WHO Africa's coordinator for immunization and vaccines development reported that African nations had destroyed some 450,000 vaccine doses due to their expiry dates. He cited Malawi, South Sudan, Liberia, Mauritania, Gambia, Sierra Leone, Guinea, Comoros and the Democratic Republic of Congo as examples.

Also in July 2021, the European Investment Bank committed to fund Senegal's first COVID-19 vaccine production factory, at Institut Pasteur de Dakar. By the end of 2022, this factory is expected to manufacture up to 25 million doses of a licensed COVID-19 vaccine per month. This is part of a wide effort by the European Investment Bank to address the health and economic impact of COVID-19. Meanwhile, BioNTech and the European Union are collaborating to assess mRNA vaccine production facilities in Rwanda and Senegal.

In seven African countries (Botswana, Cape Verde, Mauritius, Morocco, Rwanda, Seychelles, Tunisia) the entire targeted population had been fully vaccinated by the end of 2021. At the other end of the scale, there was no mass vaccination in Eritrea, while in Burundi and the Democratic Republic of the Congo less than 0.4% of the targeted population had been fully vaccinated.

== Background ==
=== Approvals ===
==== Oxford–AstraZeneca / Covishield ====
- Full approval: —
- Emergency use: WHO (15 February 2021), Africa Regulatory Taskforce (25 February 2021), Angola (March 2021), Benin (March 2021), Botswana (February 2021), Burkina Faso (May 2021), Cameroon (April 2021), Cape Verde (March 2021), Central African Republic (May 2021), Côte d'Ivoire (February 2021), DRC (April 2021), Djibouti (22 February 2021), Egypt (30 January 2021), Eswatini (March 2021), Ethiopia (March 2021), Gambia (March 2021), Ghana (March 2021), Guinea-Bissau (March 2021), Kenya (May 2021), Lesotho (March 2021), Liberia, Libya (March 2021), Malawi (February 2021), Mali (January 2021), Mauritius (January 2021), Morocco (6 January 2021), Namibia (March 2021), Niger (March 2021), Nigeria (18 February 2021), Rwanda (March 2021), São Tomé and Principe, Senegal (March 2021), Seychelles (January 2021), Sierra Leone (March 2021), Somalia (March 2021), South Africa (1 February 2021; suspended 7 February 2021), South Sudan (April 2021), Sudan (March 2021), Togo (March 2021), Tunisia (7 May 2021), Uganda (March 2021), Zambia (March 2021).

==== Pfizer–BioNTech ====
- Full approval: —
- Emergency use: WHO (31 December 2020), Botswana (April 2021), Cape Verde (March 2021), Côte d'Ivoire (January 2021), Kenya (2 August 2021), Libya (March 2021), Malawi, Nigeria (30 April 2021), Rwanda (March 2021), Seychelles (27 July 2021), South Africa (11 March 2021), Tunisia (13 January 2021), Zambia.

==== Moderna ====
- Full approval: —
- Emergency use: WHO (30 April 2021), Botswana (April 2021), Cape Verde (March 2021), Kenya (19 August 2021), Libya (March 2021), Malawi, Nigeria (15 July 2021).

==== Janssen ====
- Full approval: —
- Emergency use: WHO (30 April 2021), Africa Regulatory Taskforce (10 March 2021), Botswana (April 2021), Cameroon (April 2021), Cape Verde (March 2021), Egypt (August 2021), Ghana (August 2021), Libya (March 2021), Malawi, Nigeria (17 May 2021), South Africa (31 March 2021), Tanzania (July 2021), Tunisia (8 April 2021), Zambia, Zimbabwe (28 July 2021).

==== Sinopharm BIBP ====
- Full approval: Seychelles.
- Emergency use: WHO (7 May 2021), Angola (March 2021), Cameroon (April 2021), Cape Verde (March 2021), Chad, Comoros (May 2021), Egypt (3 January 2021), Gabon (March 2021), Gambia (17 June 2021), Malawi, Mauritania (March 2021), Mauritius (March 2021), Morocco (22 January 2021), Mozambique (March 2021), Namibia (March 2021), Niger (April 2021), Nigeria (24 August 2021), Republic of the Congo (March 2021), Senegal (March 2021), Sierra Leone (March 2021), Somalia (April 2021), Tunisia (12 July 2021), Zambia, Zimbabwe (10 March 2021).

==== Sputnik V / Sputnik Light ====
- Full approval: —
- Emergency use: Algeria (10 January 2021), Angola (3 March 2021), Cameroon (19 March 2021), Djibouti (3 March 2021), Egypt (24 February 2021), Gabon (17 February 2021), Ghana (20 February 2021), Guinea (December 2020), Kenya (10 March 2021), Libya (April 2021), Mali (30 March 2021), Mauritius (22 March 2021), Morocco (10 March 2021), Namibia (11 March 2021), Nigeria (15 July 2021), Republic of the Congo (3 March 2021), Seychelles (19 March 2021), Tunisia (30 January 2021), Zimbabwe (9 March 2021).

==== CoronaVac ====
- Full approval: —
- Emergency use: WHO (1 June 2021), Benin (March 2021), Botswana (April 2021), Egypt (26 April 2021), Libya (March 2021), Malawi, South Africa (3 July 2021), Tanzania (July 2021), Tunisia (5 March 2021), Zimbabwe (9 March 2021).

==== Covaxin ====
- Full approval: —
- Emergency use: WHO (3 November 2021), Botswana (April 2021), Mauritius (21 March 2021), Zimbabwe (4 March 2021).

Map of countries by approval status Approved for general use, mass vaccination underway EUA (or equivalent) granted, mass vaccination underway EUA granted, limited vaccination Approved for general use, mass vaccination planned EUA granted, mass vaccination planned EUA pending Vaccination Not Planned

=== Manufacturing ===
==== Johnson & Johnson ====
In a manufacturing deal, Johnson and Johnson plan to manufacture 220 million doses of vaccine at The Aspen Pharmacare manufacturing facility in Gqeberha, Eastern Cape. They plan to distribute the vaccine to other African countries with 30 million to go to South Africa.

==== Pfizer-BioNTech ====
Starting in 2022, the Biovac Institute in Cape Town will manufacture 100 million doses annually of the Pfizer-BioNTech COVID-19 vaccine exclusively for African countries.

==== Sputnik V ====
Algeria's pharmaceutical minister Lotfi Benbahmad announced that an agreement had been reached to produce Sputnik V COVID-19 vaccine at Saidal's manufacturing plant in Constantine.

==== ImmunityBio ====
The Biovac Institute in South Africa has a contract with ImmunityBio to manufacture the ImmunityBio COVID-19 vaccine and distribute it throughout Africa.

==== Afrigen ====
A consortium of the Biovac Institute, Afrigen and the South African Medical Research Council was mandated by the World Health Organization to develop and manufacture a COVID-19 vaccine using the same technology as the Moderna COVID-19 vaccine. Approval of the new mRNA vaccine is expected in 2024.

== Statistics ==
Updated August 5, 2026.

COVID-19 vaccine distribution by location in Africa
| | Location | Vaccinated (Note: Number of unique individuals who have received at least one dose of a COVID-19 vaccine (unless noted otherwise).) | Percent (Note: Percentage of population includes those who are partially vaccinated with a single dose. May include vaccination of non-citizen workers, which can push totals beyond 100% of the local population.) |
|---|---|---|---|
| (Mauritius) | Mauritius | 1,123,773 | 88.06% |
| (Botswana) | Botswana | 1,951,054 | 79.96% |
| (Rwanda) | Rwanda | 10,884,714 | 79.74% |
| (Tunisia) | Tunisia | 8,896,848 | 73.41% |
| (Liberia) | Liberia | 3,903,802 | 72.65% |
| (Seychelles) | Seychelles | 88,520 | 70.52% |
| (Mozambique) | Mozambique | 22,869,646 | 70.03% |
| (Cape Verde) | Cabo Verde | 356,734 | 68.64% |
| (Sierra Leone) | Sierra Leone | 5,676,123 | 68.58% |
| (Morocco) | Morocco | 25,020,168 | 67.03% |
| (Guinea) | Guinea | 8,715,641 | 62.01% |
| (São Tomé and Príncipe) | Sao Tome and Principe | 140,256 | 61.97% |
| (Zambia) | Zambia | 11,711,565 | 58.11% |
| (Comoros) | Comoros | 438,825 | 52.60% |
| (Central African Republic) | Central African Republic | 2,600,389 | 51.01% |
| (Egypt) | Egypt | 56,907,320 | 50.53% |
| (Somalia) | Somalia | 8,972,167 | 50.40% |
| (Zimbabwe) | Zimbabwe | 7,525,882 | 46.83% |
| (Angola) | Angola | 16,550,642 | 46.44% |
| (Ivory Coast) | Ivory Coast | 13,568,372 | 44.64% |
| (Lesotho) | Lesotho | 1,014,073 | 44.36% |
| (Eswatini) | Eswatini | 526,050 | 43.16% |
| (Mauritania) | Mauritania | 2,103,754 | 43.15% |
| (Uganda) | Uganda | 20,033,188 | 42.34% |
| (Nigeria) | Nigeria | 93,829,430 | 42.05% |
| (Ethiopia) | Ethiopia | 52,489,510 | 41.86% |
| (Ghana) | Ghana | 13,864,186 | 41.82% |
| (South Sudan) | South Sudan | 4,315,127 | 39.15% |
| (South Africa) | South Africa | 24,210,952 | 38.81% |
| (Djibouti) | Djibouti | 421,573 | 37.07% |
| (Guinea-Bissau) | Guinea-Bissau | 747,057 | 35.48% |
| (Libya) | Libya | 2,316,327 | 32.07% |
| (Sudan) | Sudan | 15,207,452 | 30.79% |
| (Togo) | Togo | 2,255,579 | 27.95% |
| (Chad) | Chad | 5,147,667 | 27.89% |
| (Burkina Faso) | Burkina Faso | 6,089,089 | 27.05% |
| (Benin) | Benin | 3,697,190 | 26.87% |
| (Kenya) | Kenya | 14,494,372 | 26.72% |
| (Malawi) | Malawi | 5,433,538 | 26.42% |
| (The Gambia) | Gambia | 674,314 | 25.58% |
| (Niger) | Niger | 6,248,483 | 24.69% |
| (Namibia) | Namibia | 629,767 | 21.79% |
| (Mali) | Mali | 4,354,292 | 18.87% |
| (Algeria) | Algeria | 7,840,131 | 17.24% |
| (Democratic Republic of the Congo) | Democratic Republic of the Congo | 17,045,720 | 16.65% |
| (Senegal) | Senegal | 2,684,696 | 15.21% |
| (Equatorial Guinea) | Equatorial Guinea | 270,109 | 14.98% |
| (Cameroon) | Cameroon | 3,753,733 | 13.58% |
| (Gabon) | Gabon | 311,244 | 12.80% |
| (Republic of the Congo) | Republic of the Congo | 695,760 | 11.53% |
| (Madagascar) | Madagascar | 2,710,365 | 8.90% |

== Vaccination by territory ==
=== Algeria ===
On 29 January 2021, Algeria launched its COVID-19 vaccination campaign, a day after receiving its first shipment of 50,000 doses of Russia's Sputnik V vaccine. As of 6 June 2021, Algeria reported administering 2.5 million doses of the vaccine. Algeria is currently vaccinating its population with both Sputnik V and Oxford-AstraZeneca vaccines.

31% of the targeted population had been fully vaccinated by the end of 2021.

=== Angola ===
On 4 March 2021, Angola began their vaccination program after receiving 624,000 doses of the two-dose Oxford AstraZeneca vaccine through the COVAX initiative. As of 15 June 2021, Angola has administered 1,314,375 doses of vaccines. 822,109 people with the first dose and 492,266 people fully vaccinated.

28% of the targeted population had been fully vaccinated by the end of 2021.

=== Benin ===
Benin launched its coronavirus vaccination campaign on 29 March 2021, initially with 144,000 doses of the Covishield (AstraZeneca) vaccine. As of 8 June 2021, Benin has administered 26,624 doses, 21,834 people with one dose and 4,790 people fully vaccinated. The country has also began administering CoronaVac. Moreover, Benin received 302,400 doses of the Janssen COVID-19 vaccine on 27 July 2021.

26% of the targeted population had been fully vaccinated by the end of 2021.

=== Botswana ===
Botswana began its vaccination program on 26 March 2021, initially using the Oxford-AstraZeneca vaccine. As of 7 June 2021, Botswana has administered 150,019 doses.

The entire targeted population had been fully vaccinated by the end of 2021.

=== Burkina Faso ===
Burkina Faso began its vaccination program on 2 June 2021, initially after receiving 115,200 doses of the Oxford–AstraZeneca COVID-19 vaccine on 30 May 2021 through COVAX, As of 14 June 2021, 17,775 doses have been administered. followed by 302,400 doses of the Janssen COVID-19 vaccine donated by the United States.

8% of the targeted population had been fully vaccinated by the end of 2021.

=== Burundi ===
Burundi's vaccination program launched on 18 October 2021, initially using 500,000 doses of the Sinopharm BIBP vaccine donated by China.

According to the World Health Organization, less than 0.1% of the targeted population had been fully vaccinated by the end of 2021.

=== Cameroon ===
Cameroon began its vaccination program on 12 April 2021, initially using the 200,000 doses of the Sinopharm BIBP vaccine donated by China. On 17 April 2021, it received 391,200 doses of the Oxford-AstraZeneca/Covishield vaccine through COVAX. As of 14 June 2021, 89,180 doses have been administered, 72,111 people with one dose and 17,069 people fully vaccinated. On 21 July 2021, Cameroon received 303,050 doses of the Janssen COVID-19 vaccine donated by the United States.

6% of the targeted population had been fully vaccinated by the end of 2021.

=== Cape Verde ===
Cape Verde began its vaccination program on 19 March 2021, shortly after they received 24,000 doses of the Oxford–AstraZeneca COVID-19 vaccine. As of 15 June 2021, 47,943 doses had been administered, 45,013 people with one dose and 2,930 people fully vaccinated. By November 2021, the entire targeted population had been fully vaccinated.

=== Central African Republic ===
The Central African Republic began its vaccination program on 20 May 2021, initially using the 60,000 doses of the Covishield vaccine delivered through the COVAX facility and 80,000 doses of the same vaccine which the Democratic Republic of Congo had been unable to use before the expiry date. As of 15 June 2021, 42,644 doses have been administered, 41,095 people with one dose and 1,549 people fully vaccinated.

22% of the targeted population had been fully vaccinated by the end of 2021.

=== Chad ===
Chad began its vaccination program on 4 June 2021, initially after receiving 200,000 doses of the Sinopharm BIBP vaccine donated by China. As of 10 June 2021, 5,324 doses have been administered.

1% of the targeted population had been fully vaccinated by the end of 2021.

=== Comoros ===
Comoros began its vaccination program on 10 April 2021, initially using the 100,000 doses of the Sinopharm BIBP vaccine donated by China and 12,000 doses of the Oxford-AstraZeneca/Covishield vaccine obtained through COVAX. As of 8 June 2021, 84,360 doses have been administered, 43,140 people with one dose and 41,220 people fully vaccinated. On 26 June 2021, Comoros purchased 200,000 additional doses of the Sinopharm BIBP vaccine, followed five days later by 100,000 doses donated by China.

By the end of April 2021, 40,863 doses had been administered; 83,907 by the end of May; 84,360 by the end of June; 162,450 by the end of July; 277,419 by the end of August; 341,134 by the end of September; 430,245 by the end of October; 523,256 by the end November; 581,547 by the end of December 2021; 598,000 by the end of January 2022; 637,961 by the end of February 2022; 642,320 by the end of April 2022. 69% of the targeted population had been fully vaccinated by the end of 2021.

=== Democratic Republic of the Congo ===
The Democratic Republic of the Congo began its vaccination program on 19 April 2021, using 1.7 million doses of the Covishield vaccine supplied through COVAX. In the first week of the campaign, after administering only 1700 doses, health officials announced that 1.3 million doses would be returned for redistribution to other countries (495,000 to Angola, 350,000 to Ghana, 250,000 to Madagascar, 140,000 to Togo and 80,000 to the Central African Republic).

According to the World Health Organization, less than 0.4% of the targeted population had been fully vaccinated by the end of 2021.

=== Republic of the Congo ===
The Republic of the Congo began its vaccination program on the 19 April 2021, using the 300,000 doses of the Sinopharm BIBP vaccine donated by China and 12,000 doses of Sputnik V. By the end of April 2021, 26,830 doses had been administered and 9,187 persons were fully vaccinated. By the end of May, 52,053 doses had been administered and 26,971 persons were fully vaccinated. By the end of June, 82,351 doses had been administered and 45,895 persons were fully vaccinated. By the end of July, 136,309 doses had been administered and 75,739 persons were fully vaccinated. By the end of August, 175,211 doses had been administered and 96,270 persons were fully vaccinated. By the end of September 2021, 221,985 doses had been administered and 107,873 persons were fully vaccinated. By the end of October 2021, 269,914 doses had been administered and 112,541 persons (5% of the targeted population) were fully vaccinated. By the end of November 2021, 644,918 doses had been administered and 474,446 persons (21% of the targeted population) were fully vaccinated. By the end of December 2021, 758,891 doses had been administered and 583,609 persons (25% of the targeted population) were fully vaccinated. By the end of March 2022, 818,931 doses had been administered and 640,464 persons were fully vaccinated. By the end of April 2022, 831,318 doses had been administered and 652,422 persons were fully vaccinated.

=== Côte d'Ivoire ===
Côte d'Ivoire began its vaccination program on 1 March 2021, using 504,000 doses of AstraZeneca's Covishield vaccine provided through COVAX and 50,000 doses donated by India. On 30 May 2021, Côte d'Ivoire borrowed 100,000 doses of the AstraZeneca vaccine from Niger, on the understanding that Côte d'Ivoire will return 100,000 doses at a later date. The country received 100,620 doses of the Pfizer–BioNTech COVID-19 vaccine on 16 June; 100,000 doses of the Sinopharm BIBP vaccine donated by China on 26 June; and 97,200 doses of the AstraZeneca vaccine from Mali on 28 June 2021. By the end of July 2021, more than a million doses had been administered. Some 1.5 million doses of the Pfizer-BioNTech vaccine, donated by the United States, arrived on 20 August, followed by 108,000 doses of the Janssen vaccine on 2 September, 816,000 doses of the Sinopharm BIBP vaccine on 17 September through COVAX, and 108,000 doses of the Oxford-AstraZeneca vaccine on 24 September 2021 donated by France. On 3 October 2021, the country received 282,000 doses of the Oxford-AstraZeneca vaccine donated by Germany, followed two days later by 129,600 doses of the Janssen vaccine. On 13 October 2021, it received 124,800 doses of the Oxford-AstraZeneca vaccine donated by Italy. On 4 November 2021, it received 432,000 doses of the Oxford-AstraZeneca vaccine through COVAX. On 18 and 20 November respectively, it received more than 300,000 purchased doses of the Janssen vaccine followed by 374,460 doses of the same vaccine donated by the United States. On 26 November 2021, 0.8 million doses of the Sinopharm vaccine arrived, purchased through COVAX. On 15 December 2021, the country received more than one million doses of the Janssen vaccine donated by Italy and nearly 1.3 million doses of the same vaccine donated by Spain. On 30 December 2021 and 3 January 2022, it received more than 1.6 million doses of the Pfizer-BioNTech vaccine, donated by the United States. On 26 January 2022, it received a U.S. donation of more than 1.7 million doses of the same vaccine.

In the first three months of the campaign, more than half a million persons received their first inoculation. In the first six months, 1.4 million doses were administered. In the first nine months, 3.5 million doses were administered. In the first year of the campaign, 10.3 million doses were administered. 20% of the targeted population had been fully vaccinated by the end of 2021.

=== Djibouti ===
Djibouti began its vaccination program on 15 March 2021, initially with 24,000 doses of AstraZeneca's Covishield vaccine provided through COVAX.

23% of the targeted population had been fully vaccinated by the end of 2021.

=== Egypt ===
Egypt began its vaccination program on 24 January 2021. Egypt received 50,000 doses of the Sinopharm BIBP vaccine on 10 December 2020, followed by 50,000 doses of the AstraZeneca vaccine on 31 January 2021. In February, March and May 2021, Egypt received 1.1 million doses of the Sinopharm BIBP vaccine and 2.55 million doses of the Oxford–AstraZeneca vaccine.

49% of the targeted population had been fully vaccinated by the end of 2021.

=== Equatorial Guinea ===
Equatorial Guinea began its vaccination program on 15 February 2021, initially with 100,000 doses of the Sinopharm BIBP vaccine donated by China.

35% of the targeted population had been fully vaccinated by the end of 2021.

=== Eritrea ===
COVID-19 vaccination has not begun in Eritrea as of May 2022.

=== Eswatini ===
Eswatini began its vaccination program on 19 February 2021, initially with 32,000 doses of the Oxford-AstraZeneca/Covishield vaccine. In early May 2021, it was reported that Eswatini had administered all of the doses it had so far received.

64% of the targeted population had been fully vaccinated by the end of 2021.

=== Ethiopia ===
Ethiopia began its vaccination program on 13 March 2021, initially with 2.2 million doses of the Oxford-AstraZeneca COVID-19 vaccine obtained through COVAX on 7 March 2021. Two months later 1.3 million persons had been inoculated, rising to 2 million by 28 June, 2.2 million by the end of July, 2.5 million by the end of August, and 3.5 million by the end of September; 4.8 million by the end of October; 8.8 million by the end of November; 10.9 million by the end of December 2021; 11.0 million by the end of January 2022; 24.3 million by the end of February 2022; 29.4 million by the end of March 2022. 9% of the targeted population had been fully vaccinated by the end of 2021.

=== Gabon ===
Gabon began its vaccination program on 23 March 2021, initially with 100,000 doses of the Sinopharm BIBP vaccine. By the end of May 2021, 22,524 doses had been administered; 56,758 by the end of June; 100,240 by the end of July; 127,757 by the end of August; 180,320 by the end of September; 223,308 by the end of October; 273,421 by the end of November; 438,557 by the end of December 2021; 499,247 by the end of January 2022; 550,042 by the end of March 2022; 556,657 by the end of April 2022. 21% of the targeted population had been fully vaccinated by the end of 2021.

=== Gambia ===
Gambia began its vaccination program on 12 March 2021. 21,259 doses had been administered by the end of April; 29,148 by the end of May; 40,810 by the end of June; 189,196 by the end of August; 207,195 by the end of September; 258,505 by the end of October; 268,008 by the end of November; 280,797 by the end of December 2021; 349,875 by the end of January 2022. 24% of the targeted population had been fully vaccinated by the end of 2021.

=== Ghana ===
Ghana began its vaccination program on 1 March 2021 using the Oxford-AstraZeneca vaccine provided through COVAX. In early May 2021, it was reported that Ghana had administered all of the doses it had so far received.

18% of the targeted population had been fully vaccinated by the end of 2021.

=== Guinea ===
Guinea began its vaccination program in March 2021, initially with donated doses of the Sputnik V COVID-19 vaccine from Russia.

56,479 vaccine doses had been administered by the end of March; 135,477 by the end of April; 353,067 by the end of May; 536,992 by the end of June; 805,440 by the end of July; 1.1 million by the end of August; 1.8 million by the end of September; 2.3 million by the end of October; 2.6 million by the end of November; 2.9 million by the end of December 2021; 4.7 million by the end of January 2022; 5.5 million by the end of February 2022; 6.1 million by the end of April 2022. 19% of the targeted population had been fully vaccinated by the end of 2021.

=== Guinea-Bissau ===
Guinea-Bissau began its vaccination program on 2 April 2021. 5,877 doses had been administered by the end of April; 5,889 by the end of May; 23,064 by the end of June; 25,225 by the end of July; 29,238 by the end of August; 94,715 by the end of September; 139,369 by the end of October; 368,395 by the end of November; 413,938 by the end of December 2021; 423,400 by the end of January 2022; 556,675 by the end of February 2022; 562,620 by the end of March 2022. 3% of the targeted population had been fully vaccinated by the end of 2021.

=== Kenya ===
Kenya began its vaccination program on 5 March 2021, shortly after they received a little over 1 million doses of the Oxford-AstraZeneca vaccine through the COVAX vaccine distribution program. On 31 July 2021, Kenya took delivery of 410,000 doses of the Oxford-AstraZeneca vaccine donated by the United Kingdom. On 23 August 2021, Kenya received a donation of 880,460 doses of the Moderna COVID‑19 vaccine from the United States.

0.8 million vaccine doses had been administered by the end of April; 1.0 million by the end of May; 1.3 million by the end of June; 1.7 million by the end of July; 2.8 million by the end of August; 3.7 million by the end of September; 4.9 million by the end of October; 6.7 million by the end of November; 9.7 million by the end of December 2021; 11.9 million by the end of January 2022; 16.7 million by the end of February 2022; 17.4 million by the end of March 2022; 17.8 million by the end of April 2022. 16% of the targeted population had been fully vaccinated by the end of 2021.

=== Lesotho ===
Lesotho began its vaccination program on 10 March 2021. By the end of April, 15,818 vaccine doses had been administered; 36,637 by the end of May; 56,322 by the end of June; 72,948 by the end of July; 201,795 by the end of August; 359,980 by the end of September; 514,519 by the end of October; 617,671 by the end of November; 698,383 by the end of December 2021; 830,779 by the end of January 2022; 926,760 by the end of February 2022; 933,825 by the end of April 2022. 85% of the targeted population had been fully vaccinated by the end of 2021.

=== Liberia ===
Liberia began its vaccination program on 1 April 2021, initially with 96,000 doses of AstraZeneca's Covishield vaccine provided through the COVAX pillar. On 25 July 2021, Liberia took delivery of 302,400 doses of the Janssen COVID-19 vaccine donated by the United States.

By the end of April, 7,492 vaccine doses had been administered; 56,144 by the end of May; 86,345 by the end of June; 95,423 by the end of July; 113,680 by the end of August; 299,217 by the end of September; 438,430 by the end of October; 595,558 by the end of November; 880,313 by the end of December 2021; 1,146,910 by the end of January 2022; 2,201,300 by the end of March 2022. 36% of the targeted population had been fully vaccinated by the end of 2021.

=== Libya ===
Libya began its vaccination program on 11 April 2021, initially with 57,600 doses of the Oxford-AstraZeneca vaccine, 200,000 doses of Sputnik V Light, and 150,000 doses of CoronaVac donated by Turkey. By the end of May 2021, Libya had received 575,200 doses of Oxford-AstraZeneca, Sputnik V, and CoronaVac. In June it received 54,990 doses of the Pfizer vaccine and 50,000 doses of Sputnik V, taking the total number of doses received to 680,190.

By the end of April 2021, 61,212 vaccine doses had been administered. In early May, it was reported that Libya had administered all of the doses it had so far received. By the end of May, 212,421 doses had been administered; 379,404 by the end of June; 546,745 by the end of July; 1,031,060 by the end of August; 1,586,055 by the end of September; 1,900,831 by the end of October; 2,291,638 by the end of November; 2,679,874 by the end of December 2021; 3,051,024 by the end of January 2022; 3,324,621 by the end of February 2022; 3,436,348 by the end of March 2022. 30% of the targeted population had been fully vaccinated by the end of 2021.

=== Madagascar ===
Madagascar began its vaccination program on 10 May 2021, initially using 250,000 doses of the Oxford–AstraZeneca COVID-19 vaccine through COVAX. In July and October 2021, the United States donated 638,750 doses of the Janssen vaccine to Madagascar. On 26 December 2021, Madagascar received 400,800 doses of the Oxford-AstraZeneca vaccine.

By the end of May, 44,848 doses had been administered; 197,001 by the end of June; 443,159 by the end of September; 528,797 by the end of October; 668,392 by the end of November; 742,069 by the end of December 2021; 971,426 by the end of January 2022; 1,228,391 by the end of February 2022; 2,236,368 by the end of March 2022; 2,264,611 by the end of April 2022. 5% of the targeted population had been fully vaccinated by the end of 2021.

=== Malawi ===
Malawi began its vaccination program on 11 March 2021.

134,289 doses were administered in March and 161,828 in April. 19,610 doses were incinerated in May due to their expiry date.

By the end of July 2021, 139,581 persons had been fully vaccinated; 405,722 persons by the end of August; 499,390 by the end of September; 547,803 by the end of October; 599,857 by the end of November; 687,294 by the end of December 2021 (9% of the targeted population); 775,730 by the end of January 2022; 811,834 by the end of February 2022; 908,688 by the end of April 2022.

=== Mali ===
Mali began its vaccination program on 31 March 2021, initially with 396,000 doses of the Oxford-AstraZeneca COVID-19 vaccine obtained through COVAX. On 28 June 2021, Mali gave 97,200 doses of the Oxford-AstraZeneca vaccine to Côte d'Ivoire because of their short expiry date.

By the end of April 2021, 53,711 vaccine doses had been administered; 134,252 by the end of May; 186,191 by the end of June; 196,862 by the end of July; 296,490 by the end of August; 413,563 by the end of September; 436,116 by the end of October; 779,938 by the end of November; 1,087,393 by the end of December 2021; 1,409,266 by the end of January 2022; 1,634,711 by the end of February 2022; 1,873,615 by the end of March 2022; 1,993,965 by the end of April 2022. 5% of the targeted population had been fully vaccinated by the end of 2021.

=== Mauritania ===
Mauritania began its vaccination program on 26 March 2021, initially with 50,000 doses of the Sinopharm BIBP vaccine donated by China, 5,000 doses of the Pfizer–BioNTech COVID-19 vaccine donated by United Arab Emirates and 31,200 doses of the Oxford-AstraZeneca COVID-19 vaccine donated by France.

By the end of April 2021, 12,135 vaccine doses had been administered; 39,806 by the end of May; 163,578 by the end of June; 193,776 by the end of July; 565,434 by the end of August; 894,869 by the end of September; 1.6 million by the end of October; 1.7 million by the end of November; 1.9 million by the end of December 2021; 2.5 million by the end of January 2022; 2.6 million by the end of February 2022; 2.7 million by the end of March 2022; 2.7 million by the end of April 2022. 38% of the targeted population had been fully vaccinated by the end of 2021.

=== Mauritius ===
Mauritius began its vaccination program on 26 January 2021, initially with 100,000 doses of the Covishield vaccine donated by India. By the end of March 2021, 0.17 million vaccine doses had been administered; 0.2 million by the end of April; 0.4 million by the end of May; 0.7 million by the end of June; 1.2 million by the end of July; 1.5 million by the end of August; 1.6 million by the end of September; 1.8 million by the end of October; 1.9 million by the end of November; 2 million by the end of December 2021; 2.6 million by the end of March 2022; 2.7 million by the end of April 2022. The entire targeted population had been fully vaccinated by the end of July 2021.

=== Morocco ===
Morocco began its vaccination program on 28 January 2021. By early September 2021, the entire targeted population had been fully vaccinated.

=== Mozambique ===
Mozambique began its vaccination program on 8 March 2021.

In July and September 2021, Mozambique received 638,400 doses of the Janssen COVID-19 vaccine donated by the United States. On 22 November 2021, Mozambique received 840,000 doses of the same vaccine from the same donor, followed four days later by 756,000 doses of the same vaccine courtesy of the Mastercard Foundation and more than two million doses of the same vaccine on 6 December 2021.

By the end of March 2021, 70,000 vaccine doses had been administered; 141,640 by the end of April; 394,312 by the end of May; 438,382 by the end of June; 714,776 by the end of July; 2.3 million by the end of August; 3.6 million by the end of September; 5.9 million by the end of October; 9.8 million by the end of November; 14.4 million by the end of December 2021; 19.8 million by the end of January 2022; 23.6 million by the end of February 2022; 27.8 million by the end of March 2022; 31.6 million by the end of April 2022. 49% of the targeted population had been fully vaccinated by the end of 2021.

=== Namibia ===
Namibia began its vaccination program on 19 March 2021, initially with 100,000 doses of the Sinopharm BIBP vaccine donated by China and 24,000 doses of the Oxford–AstraZeneca COVID-19 vaccine purchased through COVAX. By the end of April 2021, 15,060 vaccine doses had been administered; 76,578 by the end of May; 141,209 by the end of June; 195,184 by the end of July; 297,066 by the end of August; 304,634 by the end of September; 584,381 by the end of October; 596,748 by the end of November; 643,829 by the end of December 2021; 773,702 by the end of January 2022; 814,463 by the end of February 2022; 834,756 by the end of March 2022. 33% of the targeted population had been fully vaccinated by the end of 2021.

On 6 December 2021, President Geingob announced that more than 150,000 vaccine doses had been destroyed due to their expiry date and insufficient interest in vaccinations.

=== Niger ===
Niger began its vaccination program on 29 March 2021, initially with 400,000 doses of the Sinopharm BIBP vaccine donated by China and 380,000 doses of the Oxford–AstraZeneca COVID-19 vaccine provided through the COVAX facility, donated by India. On 30 May 2021, Niger shared 100,000 doses of the Oxford-AstraZeneca vaccine with Ivory Coast on the understanding that Ivory Coast will return 100,000 doses to Niger at a later date. In late July 2021, it received 302,400 doses of the Janssen COVID-19 vaccine donated by the United States.

By the end of April 2021, 9,562 vaccine doses had been administered; 162,193 by the end of May; 336,809 by the end of June; 401,133 by the end of July; 491,738 by the end of August; 533,899 by the end of September; 896,106 by the end of October; 963,041 by the end of November; 1,716,942 by the end of December 2021; 1,798,575 by the end of January 2022; 1,840,055 by the end of February 2022; 2,681,673 by the end of March 2022; 2,692,524 by the end of April 2022. 5% of the targeted population had been fully vaccinated by the end of 2021.

=== Nigeria ===
Total COVID-19 vaccine doses by province in Nigeria

Nigeria began its vaccination program on 5 March 2021. The rollout began after the delivery of 4 million Oxford-AstraZeneca, with more doses donated by India and MTN. And the vaccination has spread out throughout all thirty-six states of the country in less than two months after arrival.

5% of the targeted population had been fully vaccinated by the end of 2021.

=== Rwanda ===
Rwanda began its vaccination program on 5 March 2021, two days after receiving 240,000 doses of the Oxford–AstraZeneca COVID-19 vaccine through COVAX and 50,000 doses of the same vaccine donated by India. In early May 2021, it was reported that Rwanda had administered all of the doses it had so far received. On 1 June 2021, Rwanda received 100,600 doses of the Pfizer–BioNTech COVID-19 vaccine through COVAX, bringing Rwanda's total number of doses to 203,560 of Pfizer–BioNTech and 290,000 of Oxford–AstraZeneca/Covishield. In two batches on 18 and 20 August 2021, Rwanda received 489,060 Pfizer-BioNTech doses donated by the United States, as well as 200,000 doses of the Sinopharm BIBP vaccine donated by China.

By the end of August 2021, 854,194 vaccine doses had been administered; 3.3 million by the end of September; 5.2 million by the end of October; 8.5 million by the end of November; 13.1 million by the end of December 2021; 16.6 million by the end of January 2022; 19.4 million by the end of February 2022; 20.1 million by the end of March 2022. The entire targeted population had been fully vaccinated by the end of 2021.

=== São Tomé and Principe ===
São Tomé and Principe vaccination program began on 15 March 2021, initially with 24,000 doses of the Oxford–AstraZeneca COVID-19 vaccine provided through COVAX. By the end of April 2021, 12,367 vaccine doses had been administered; 20,725 by the end of May; 29,258 by the end of June; 43,978 by the end of July; 43,987 by the end of August; 94,640 by the end of September; 108,838 by the end of October; 121,357 by the end of November; 137,612 by the end of December 2021; 151,040 by the end of January 2022; 193,775 by the end of February 2022; 208,657 by the end of March 2022. 57% of the targeted population had been fully vaccinated by the end of 2021.

=== Senegal ===
Senegal began its vaccination program on 23 February 2021, initially with 200,000 doses of the Sinopharm BIBP vaccine it purchased from China. In early May 2021, it was reported that Senegal had administered all of the doses it had so far received.

14% of the targeted population had been fully vaccinated by the end of 2021.

=== Seychelles ===
Seychelles began its vaccination program on 10 January 2021, initially with 50,000 doses of the Sinopharm BIBP vaccine donated by the United Arab Emirates and 50,000 doses of the Oxford–AstraZeneca vaccine donated by India. By mid-May 2021 Seychelles had exceeded its initial target of inoculating 70,000 persons. In June 2021, Seychelles received 50,000 additional doses of the Sinopharm BIBP vaccine. In July 2021, the Ministry of Health changed its vaccination target, from 70% of the population to as high a proportion as possible, including children aged between 12 and 17 years who will receive the Pfizer-BioNTech vaccine. A first batch of 35,100 doses of the Pfizer-BioNTech vaccine donated by the United States through COVAX arrived on 8 September 2021, enabling vaccination of children from 10 September 2021. Another batch of 39,807 doses of the same vaccine donated by the United States arrived on 17 December 2021.

By the end of February 2021, 23549 persons had received both vaccine doses; 37957 by the end of March; 59160 by the end of April; 64029 by the end of May; 67670 by the end of June; 68135 by the end of July; 70441 by the end of August; 71091 by the end of September; 76283 by the end of October; 77951 by the end of November; 78263 by the end of December 2021; 78598 by the end of January 2022; 79921 by the end of February 2022; 80,153 by the end of March 2022; 80,457 by the end of April 2022. The entire targeted population was fully vaccinated by mid-April 2021. By mid-December 2021, more than 20000 persons had received an additional third vaccination.

=== Sierra Leone ===
Sierra Leone began its vaccination program on 15 March 2021, initially with 96,000 doses of the Oxford-AstraZeneca COVID-19 vaccine. On 20 March 2021 it received 42,000 doses of the same vaccine from the African Union. Because of their expiry date in April 2021, only 29,000 of the 42,000 doses could be administered.

By the end of March 2021, 17,143 vaccine doses had been administered; 56,474 by the end of April; 79,762 by the end of May; 114,087 by the end of June; 159,925 by the end of July; 193,557 by the end of August; 236,465 by the end of September; 396,196 by the end of October; 868,726 by the end of November; 923,880 by the end of December 2021; 1.4 million by the end of January 2022; 1.8 million by the end of February 2022; 2.9 million by the end of March 2022; 3.3 million by the end of April 2022. 12% of the targeted population had been fully vaccinated by the end of 2021.

=== Somalia ===
Somalia began its vaccination campaign on 16 March 2021, a day after taking delivery of 300,000 doses of the Oxford–AstraZeneca COVID-19 vaccine through the COVAX facility. On 26 October 2021, Somalia received 163,000 doses of the Oxford-AstraZeneca vaccine from Germany through COVAX. On 27 August 2022, Somalia received more than 1.6 million doses of the Janssen vaccine from the Czech Republic and Sweden through COVAX.

12,803 vaccine doses had been administered by the end of March 2021; 120,749 by the end of April; 134,133 by the end of May; 190,399 by the end of June; 235,882 by the end of July; 291,053 by the end of August; 477,075 by the end of September; 654,862 by the end of October; 1.2 million by the end of November; two million by the end of December 2021; 2.2 million by the end of January 2022. 12% of the targeted population had been fully vaccinated by the end of 2021.

=== South Africa ===
Total COVID-19 vaccine doses by province in South Africa

South Africa began its national vaccination program on 18 February 2021. The program will go through in phases, prioritizing healthcare and frontline workers and then those over the age of 65.

South Africa has administered 4,017,442 vaccine doses across the country as of 8 July 2021. South Africa has accepted delivery of 3 different vaccines, Janssen (Johnson & Johnson), Pfizer-BioNTech and Oxford-AstraZeneca, administering both the Janssen and Pfizer-BioNTech vaccines, with the Oxford-AstraZeneca vaccine suspended, due to its ineffectiveness against the Beta variant.

Two-thirds of the targeted population had been fully vaccinated by the end of 2021.

=== South Sudan ===
South Sudan began its vaccination program on 6 April 2021, initially with 132,000 doses of the Oxford–AstraZeneca COVID-19 vaccine from COVAX and 60,000 doses of the same vaccine donated by the African Union and MTN. Health officials decided on 15 April to stop using the doses donated by the AU and MTN due to their short expiry date. The 60,000 doses from the AU and MTN were subsequently destroyed.

By the end of April 2021, 3790 vaccine doses had been administered; 10,758 by the end of May; 46,760 by the end of June; 56,989 by the end of August; 108,602 by the end of September; 134,371 by the end of October; 236,710 by the end of November; 268,640 by the end of December 2021; 342,453 by the end of January 2022; 524,292 by the end of February 2022; 575,057 by the end of March 2022; 668,680 by the end of April 2022. 3% of the targeted population had been fully vaccinated by the end of 2021.

=== Sudan ===
Sudan began its vaccination program on 9 March 2021, initially after they received 820,000 doses of the Oxford–AstraZeneca COVID-19 vaccine through COVAX. On 26 March 2021, it received a quarter of a million doses of the Sinopharm BIBP vaccine courtesy 7of China, followed in August by 606,700 doses of the Janssen vaccine donated by the United States and a donation from France of 218,400 doses of the Oxford-AstraZeneca vaccine delivered on 27 August 2021.

By the end of April 2021, 63,837 vaccine doses had been administered; 358,236 by the end of May; 677,957 by the end of June; 810,560 by the end of July; 829,602 by the end of August; 1,230,908 by the end of September; 1,736,099 by the end of November; 5,251,235 by the end of December 2021; 5,453,485 by the end of January 2022; 6,761,896 by the end of March 2022; 7,096,087 by the end of April 2022. 7% of the targeted population had been fully vaccinated by the end of 2021.

=== Tanzania ===
COVID-19 vaccination started in the semi-autonomous region of Zanzibar on 6 July, and in the rest of the country on 28 July 2021. In July 2021, Zanzibar received 110,000 doses of CoronaVac in two batches, donated by China. On 14 July 2021, Health Minister Dorothy Gwajima announced that Tanzania was going to receive 300,000 doses through COVAX. A week later, Prime Minister Kassim Majaliwa announced that vaccines had arrived and that those who wished could get vaccinated on a voluntary basis. On 25 July 2021, Tanzania received 1,058,400 doses of the Janssen COVID-19 vaccine through COVAX, donated by the United States. On 4 and 8 October 2021, Tanzania received 1,065,600 doses of the Sinopharm BIBP vaccine through COVAX, followed on 1 November 2021 by half a million doses of the same vaccine, donated by China. Later in November, it received 499,590 doses of the Pfizer-BioNTech vaccine donated by the United States. On 3 December 2021, Tanzania received 115,200 doses of the Janssen vaccine donated by Belgium.

By 7 August 2021, 105,745 persons had been vaccinated. A week later, the number had risen to 207,391. By the end of August 2021, the number had risen to 310,103; by the end of September 2021, 595,938; by the end of October 2021, more than one million; by the end of November 2021, more than 1.5 million; by the end of December 2021, more than 2.4 million (6% of the targeted population had been fully vaccinated); by the end of January 2022, more than 2.6 million; by the end of February 2022, more than 3.2 million; by the end of March 2022, more than 3.9 million; by the end of April 2022, more than 6.4 million.

=== Togo ===
Togo began its vaccination program on 10 March 2021, initially with 156,000 doses of the Oxford–AstraZeneca COVID-19 vaccine delivered through COVAX and 140,000 doses of the same vaccine which the Democratic Republic of Congo had been unable to use before the expiry date. In early May 2021, it was reported that Togo had administered all of the doses it had so far received.

By the end of March 2021, 57,990 persons had been fully vaccinated; 180,990 by the end of April; 318,666 by the end of May; 347,246 by the end of June; 474,776 by the end of July; 535,518 by the end of August; 1.1 million by the end of September; 1.4 million by the end of October; 1.7 million by the end of November; 2.4 million by the end of December 2021; 2.5 million by the end of January 2022; 2.7 million by the end of February 2022; 3.3 million by the end of April 2022. 30% of the targeted population had been fully vaccinated by the end of 2021.

=== Tunisia ===
Tunisia began its vaccination program on 13 March 2021, initially with 30,000 doses of the Sputnik V COVID-19 vaccine. By the end of March 2021, 44,311 vaccine doses had been administered, rising to 385,922 by the end of April 2021. In early May 2021, it was reported that Tunisia had administered all of the doses it had so far received. By the end of May, 823,614 vaccine doses had been administered. By 29 June 2021, 1,821,431 vaccine doses had been administered and 548,997 persons fully immunised. 2.6 million doses had been administered by the end of July 2021; 5.7 million by the end of August 2021; more than 8 million by the end of September 2021, by which time 3.8 million had been fully vaccinated; 10.1 million by the end of October 2021, by which time 4.5 million had been fully vaccinated; 11.1 million by the end of November 2021, by which time 5.1 million had been fully vaccinated; 12.8 million by the end of December 2021, by which time 5.9 million had been fully vaccinated; 14.3 million by the end of January 2022, by which time 6.2 million had been fully vaccinated; 14.4 million by the end of February 2022, by which time 6.3 million had been fully vaccinated (more than the entire targeted population).

=== Uganda ===
Uganda began its vaccination program on 10 March 2021, initially with 100,000 doses of the Oxford–AstraZeneca COVID-19 vaccine donated by India and 864,000 doses of the same vaccine acquired through the COVAX. Uganda plans to vaccinate 21.9 million people and to start lifting restrictions once 4.8 million have been fully vaccinated.

By 3 June 2021, 748,676 vaccine doses had been administered. By the end of June, the number of administered doses had increased to 937,417; 1.1 million by the end of July; 1.2 million by the end of August; 1.6 million by the end of September; 2.9 million by the end of October; 4.8 million by the end of November; 9.8 million by the end of December 2021; 12.9 million by the end of January 2022; 16.7 million by the end of February 2022; 17.6 million by the end of March 2022; 20.2 by the end of April 2022. 7% of the targeted population had been fully vaccinated by the end of 2021.

=== Zambia ===
Zambia began its vaccination program on 14 April 2021, initially with 228,000 doses of the Oxford–AstraZeneca COVID-19 vaccine received from COVAX. By the end of June 2021, 147,220 vaccine doses had been administered; 413,774 by the end of July; 503,707 by the end of August; 697,261 by the end of September; 857,551 by the end of October; 1.04 million by the end of December 2021; 2.9 million by the end of February 2022; 3.4 million by the end of March 2022; 3.8 million by the end of April 2022. 9% of the targeted population had been fully vaccinated by the end of 2021.

=== Zimbabwe ===
Zimbabwe began its vaccination program on 22 February 2021, initially using 200,000 doses of the Sinopharm BIBP vaccine.

52% of the target population had been fully vaccinated at the end of 2021.

== Variants resistant to vaccines ==
=== Beta variant ===
The Beta variant of the disease is more resistant than other variants to some existing vaccines.

In January 2021, Johnson & Johnson, which held trials for its Janssen COVID-19 vaccine in South Africa, reported the level of protection against moderate to severe COVID-19 infection was 72% in the United States, but 57% in South Africa.

On 6 February 2021, The Financial Times reported that provisional trial data from a study undertaken by South Africa's University of the Witwatersrand in conjunction with Oxford University demonstrated reduced efficacy of the Oxford–AstraZeneca COVID-19 vaccine against the 501.V2 variant. The study found that in a sample size of 2,000 the AZD1222 vaccine afforded only "minimal protection" in all but the most severe cases of COVID-19.

On 7 February 2021, the Minister for Health for South Africa suspended the planned deployment of around 1 million doses of the vaccine whilst they examine the data and await advice on how to proceed.

In February, Moderna reported that the current vaccine produced only one-sixth of the antibodies in response to the South African variant compared with the original virus. They have launched a trial of a new vaccine to tackle the South African 501.V2 variant.

On 17 February 2021, Pfizer announced neutralization activity was reduced by two thirds for the 501.V2 variant, while stating no claims about the efficacy of the vaccine in preventing illness for this variant could yet be made.

== See also ==
- COVID-19 pandemic in Africa
- National responses to the COVID-19 pandemic in Africa
