= Food Lover's Market =

South African supermarket chain

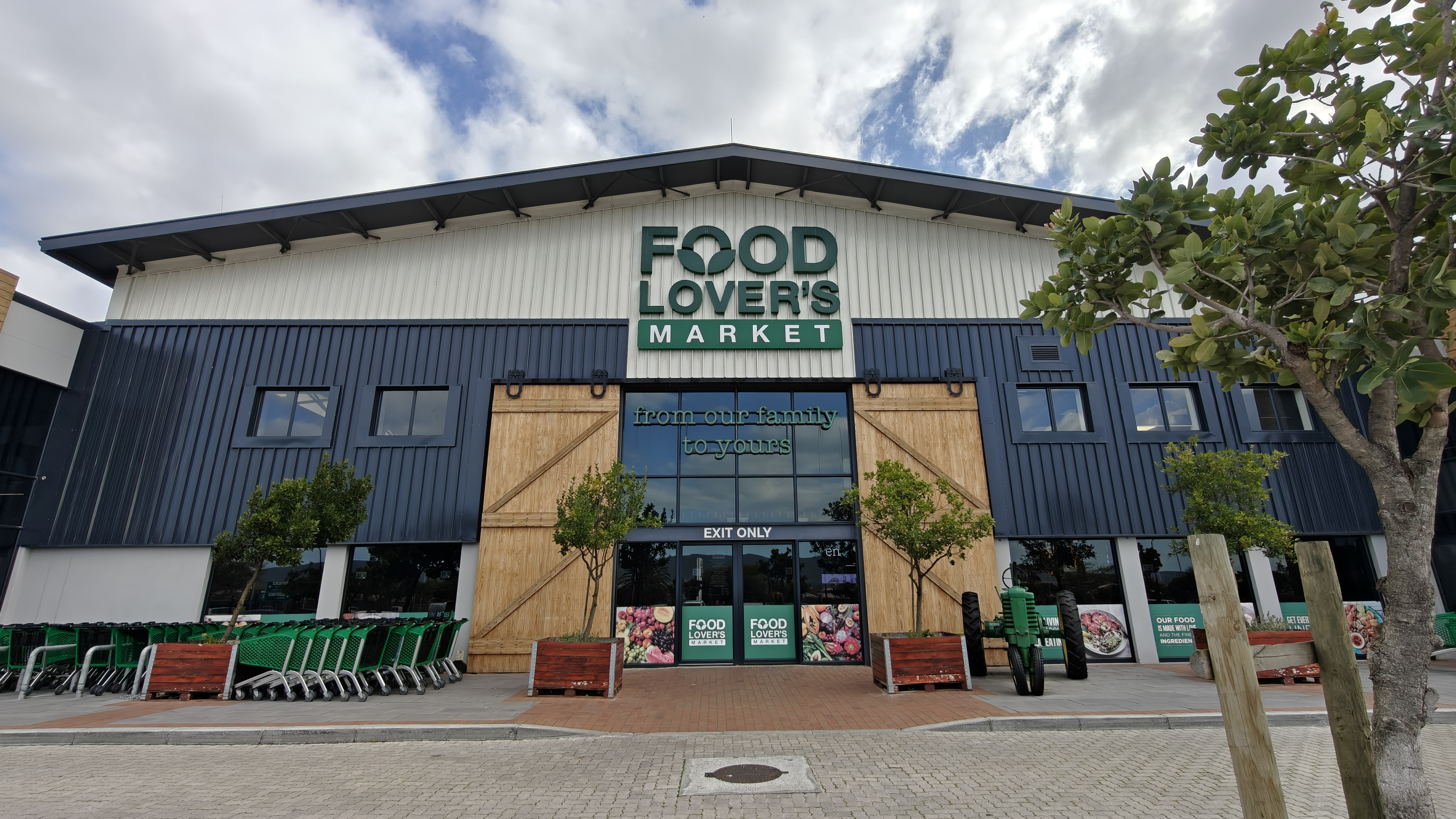
- Food Lover's Market in Bothasig, Cape Town
- Type: Private
- Industry: Retail
- Predecessor: Fruit & Veg City
- Founded: 1993; 33 years ago
- Founder: Brian Coppin; Mike Coppin
- Headquarters: Brackenfell, City of Cape Town, South Africa
- Number of locations: 120+ (2025)
- Area served: Southern Africa
- Key people: Brian Coppin (CEO)
- Number of employees: 22,000 (2025)
- Subsidiaries: Seattle Coffee Company; FreshStop; FVC International; Market Liquors; Diamond's Discount Liquor
- Website: foodloversmarket.co.za

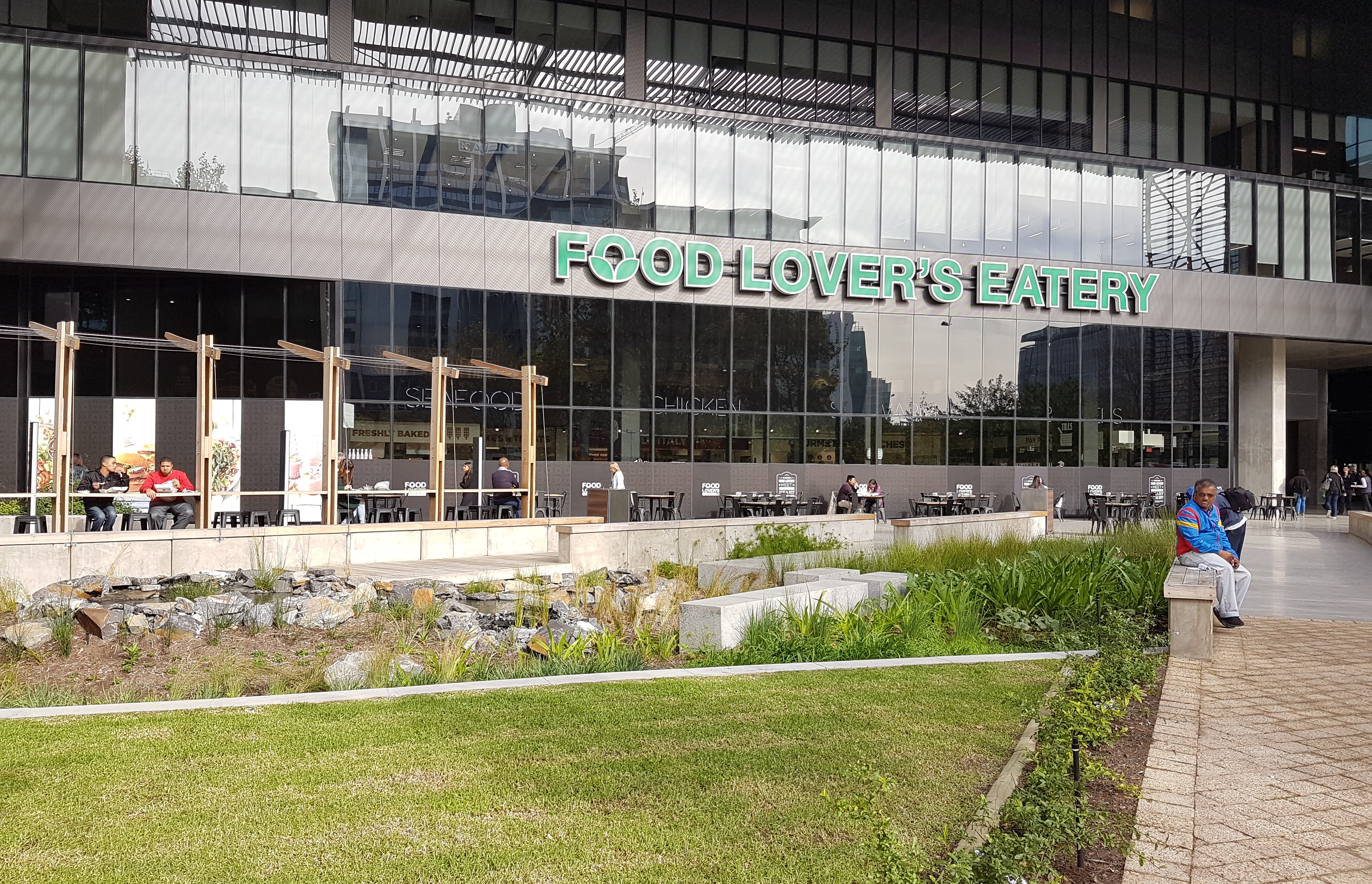
Food Lover's Eatery in Foreshore, Cape Town

Food Lover's Market (often referred to as Food Lover's) is a South African supermarket chain that operates franchised grocery stores and convenience stores in Southern Africa. The company is a member of the Franchise Association of South Africa.

Headquartered in Brackenfell, near Cape Town, Food Lover's is South Africa's largest privately-owned retailer. As of 2022, the company had over 300 stores in South Africa, two in Botswana, three in Zimbabwe, and three in Namibia.

Food Lover's owns one of South Africa's largest café chains, Seattle Coffee Company, as well as major gas station convenience store brand FreshStop, which operates at Astron Energy forecourts.

== History ==
The company was established in 1993 as a single Fruit & Veg City store in Access Park, a factory outlet complex in the Kenilworth suburb of Cape Town. The initial store was converted from an existing business, The Carrot King, into a Fruit & Veg City store.

Food Lover's Market was founded by brothers Brian and Mike Coppin, whose father had been the Director of OK Bazaars, a retail chain that was acquired by the Shoprite Group in 1997. When it opened, the company sourced its products directly from farmers and municipal markets and priced them aggressively to grow in the market whilst competing with existing large retail chains.

In 1995, the brothers were approached by someone wanting to operate a store in Port Elizabeth, and the first franchise store opened. Franchises in East London, Durban, Bloemfontein, and Pretoria followed. The company opened its first store in Johannesburg in 1999.

In 2012, the company announced that it would be converting all Fruit & Veg City outlets to the new Food Lover's Market brand. That same year, Food Lover's expanded its offering to include non-food items.

In 2014, the company announced it would begin stocking items in a number of grocery categories from British retailer Waitrose.

In 2015, the company received an R760 million investment from emerging market investor Actis. The firm's CEO, Brian Coppin, stated that the company was attracted to Actis' history of working with family-owned businesses.

In 2025 research, published by a South African media outlet, Food Lover's Market was found to have the cheapest basket of goods amongst major South African supermarket chains, by a significant margin.

In July 2026, it was reported that Food Lover’s would be closing its four Creamery ice cream stores, all of which were located in Cape Town. The brand, which had been operating for 15 years, also had a factory in Salt River. It was owned by Seattle Coffee Company, which in turn is owned by Food Lover's. The latter said the Creamery brand was no longer part of its long-term strategy.

== Brands ==
The company also operates 24-hour convenience stores under the FreshStop brand at over 200 Astron Energy gas stations across South Africa. It also sells liquor at Market Liquor stores next to select Food Lover's outlets and operates cafeteria-style restaurants at Food Lover's Eatery locations.

== Partnerships ==
Food Lover's Market receives some of its products from South African company Cape Roasters and supplies its stores through FVC International, a South African import and export company.

Food Lover's Market has a partnership with South African bank ABSA, whereby ABSA customers can earn cash back by using their debit and credit cards at Food Lover's stores.

== Corporate social responsibility ==
Over the years, Food Lover's has undertaken a number of sustainability projects, including banning single-use plastics, and investing in renewable energy, which has generated millions of kilowatt-hours of solar power.

The company also operates its Seeds of Change social entrepreneurship program, which supports small food producers. Furthermore, the group has developed coaching programs, flexible leadership training, and visible female role models, to shift the company culture and empower women in retail.

== See also ==
- Retailing in South Africa
