= Knead (South Africa) =

South African bakery and café chain

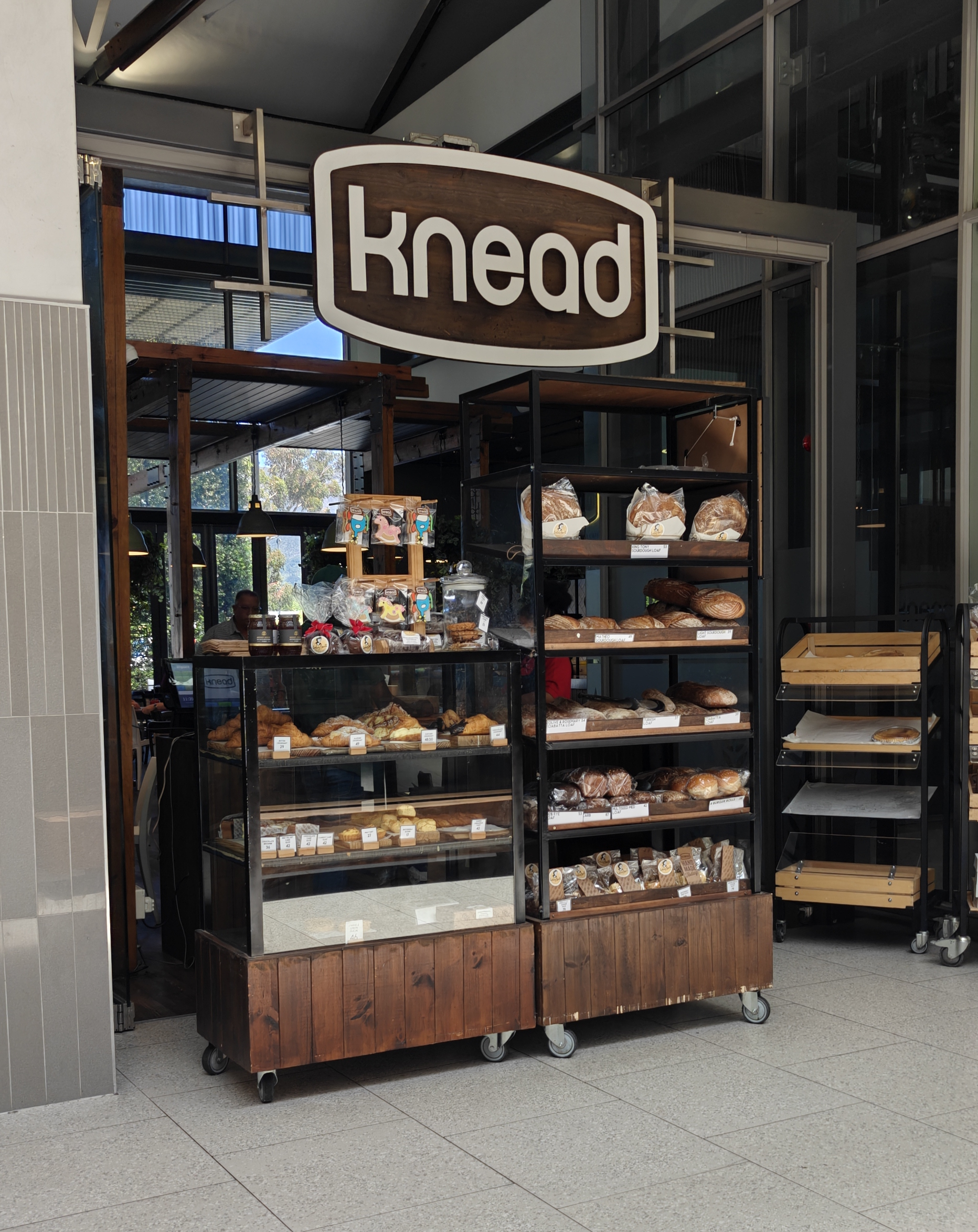
- Entrance to a Knead café in Constantia Emporium, Constantia, Cape Town
- Industry: Café; Bakery
- Founded: 2006; 20 years ago
- Headquarters: Cape Town, South Africa
- Number of locations: 4 (2026)
- Area served: South Africa
- Products: Food
- Divisions: The Baking Company
- Website: www.kneadbakery.co.za

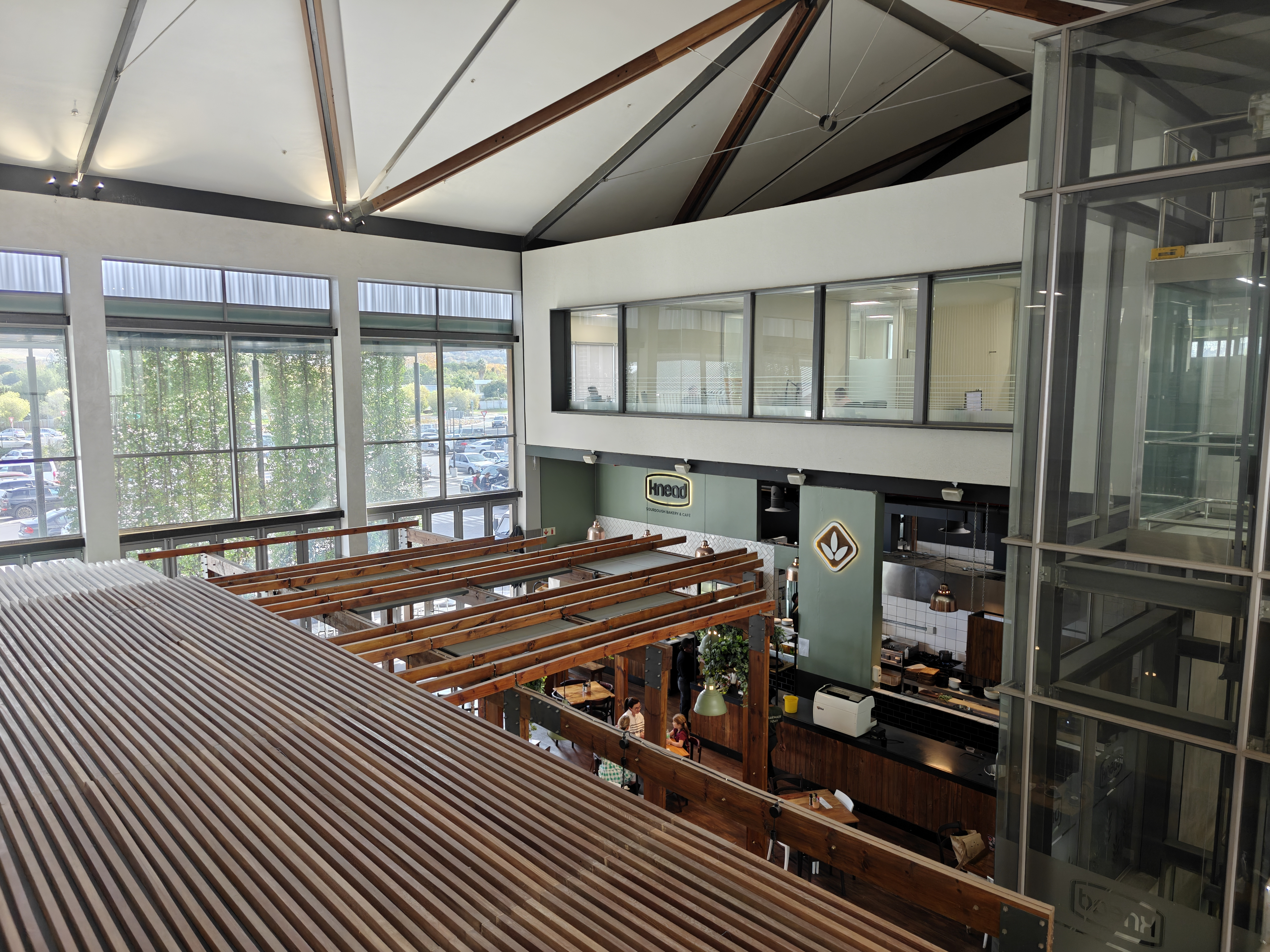
Aerial view of a Knead in Cape Town

Knead is a bakery and café chain in South Africa. Founded in 2006, the company operates four stores in the Western Cape, a catering service, and a wholesale division (The Baking Company).

== History ==
Knead was founded as a small bakery and café in 2006, by brothers Ryan and Evan Faull. The company started in Wembley Square, a retail and business center in Gardens, Cape Town.

In 2017, major South African retail chain Pick n Pay launched a flagship store revamp with a Knead bakery inside the supermarket.

At its peak, the company was operating 17 stores, and as a result of closures due to the economic situation surrounding the COVID-19 pandemic, in 2022, that total had reduced to 8 stores.

== Operations ==
Knead operates using a franchise model. Alongside the four stores the company operates in the Western Cape, Knead also runs a catering service, and operates a wholesale division called The Baking Company. The latter sells items under the Lesley Faull Signature Range brand. These items include finished products, as well as partially baked and unbaked frozen goods.

Knead makes its bread using traditional methods, utilizing sourdough and slow fermentation. The company uses family recipes, handed down from one generation to the next. Knead also delivers its bread and pastries to select restaurants, cafés, and markets.

The company sources its coffee beans from the African continent, and roasts them in-house.
