= FreshStop =

South African forecourt convenience store chain

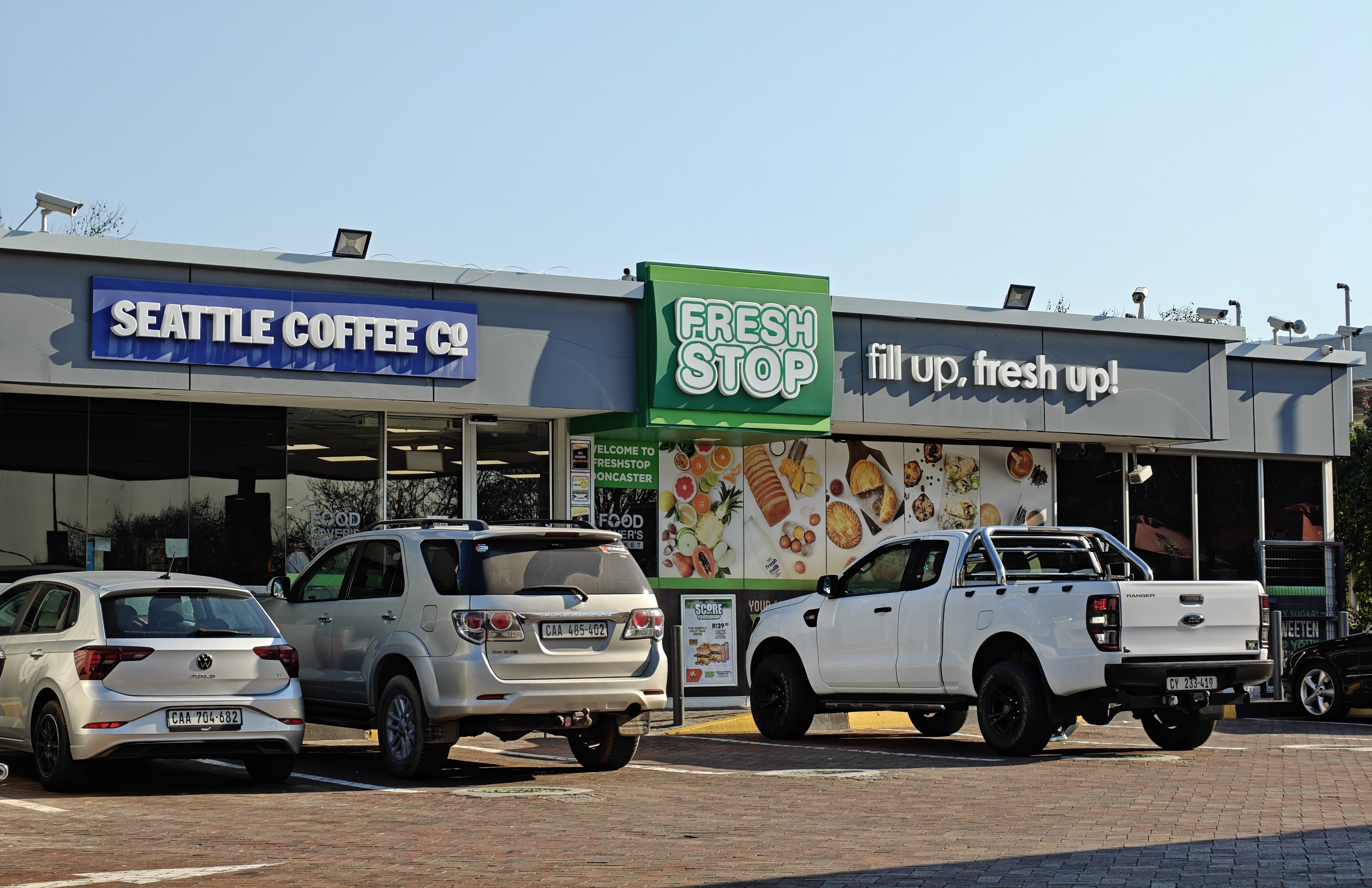
- Industry: Retail; Fuel station convenience stores
- Founded: 2009; 17 years ago
- Headquarters: Brackenfell (city of Cape Town), Western Cape, South Africa
- Number of locations: 300+ (2026)
- Area served: South Africa
- Key people: Joe Boyle (CEO)
- Products: Groceries; Beverages
- Brands: Manhattan Coffee; Grill to Go
- Parent: Food Lover's Market
- Website: freshstop.co.za

FreshStop is a major South African 24-hour fuel station convenience store chain. Owned by supermarket chain Food Lover's Market, FreshStop stores are partnered with Astron Energy, and are located at many of the latter's gas stations across South Africa. FreshStop aims to offer fresh, healthy food in a convenience store format.

Some FreshStop stores are co-located with Seattle Coffee Company stores, as both chains are owned by Food Lover's. As of March 2026, the company operates over 300 stores throughout South Africa, making it the country's largest convenience store chain.

== History ==
FreshStop was founded in 2009, when then-major gas station chain Caltex (now Astron Energy in South Africa) asked grocery chain Fruit & Veg City (now Food Lover's Market) to develop a new convenience store concept for its forecourts. This was a first of its kind in South Africa, with gas station convenience stores historically being owned by the forecourt brands themselves, and being limited in what they sold.

In September 2017, FreshStop began rolling out a new small format store type, specifically designed for small towns and rural areas. The stores used existing structures at Caltex forecourt locations, such as the gas retailer's own, unbranded stores, or mechanic workshops that were being converted into convenience stores.

In 2020, FreshStop partnered with Takealot-owned on-demand delivery service Mr D, to enable shoppers to order FreshStop items via the Mr D app. The partnership launched at 40 FreshShop stores, and the company announced that more would be added later.

In January 2024, FreshStop reported that it had reached a total of 330 outlets across South Africa.

In May 2024, FreshStop and Astron Energy signed an agreement to extend their partnership for another 10 years. At the time, there were 800 Astron gas stations in operation, and FreshStop was serving over 200,000 daily customers.

In October 2025, FreshStop, in partnership with Astron, launched a new convenience store format. Aimed at what the former called a "foodvenience" model, the store centered on freshly prepared meals and premium coffee. The integration of technology was also central to the new format, with a new PoS system being rolled out, designed to connect transactions with the forecourt to integrated the customer experience.

In the same year, it was reported that parent company Food Lover's Market had invested a total of R1 billion in FreshStop since the latter's establishment 16 years prior.

== Operations ==
As of March 2026, FreshStop operates over 300 stores across South Africa, at Astron Energy locations. The company had its stores at Caltex gas stations before they were gradually rebranded to Astron, after Glencore bought Caltex's SA operations in 2017.

In November 2025, 126 FreshStop stores were located alongside Seattle Coffee Company outlets.

The company competes in the convenience store sector with the likes of Woolworths FoodStop at Engen locations, Pick n Pay Express at BP locations, Spar at Shell locations, and OK Express at Sasol, Puma, and Total locations.

FreshStop uses the distribution centers of parent company Food Lover's Market. The company has stated that this allows it to offer certain products, such as fresh fruit juice, at cheaper prices than some cafes.

== Accolades ==
In 2013, FreshStop was named International Convenience Retailer of the Year at the NACS Insight International Convenience Retail Awards. The National Association of Convenience Stores is a trade association representing the convenience and fuel retailing industry.

In 2025, FreshStop Oaklands, in Johannesburg, was recognized as one of the world's best "Foodvenience" outlets at the International Convenience Retail Awards. The awards focus on operations that are innovative, customer-centric, and impactful, at convenience retailers across the world.

== See also ==
- Retailing in South Africa
