= Seattle Coffee Company =

Coffee shop franchise in South Africa

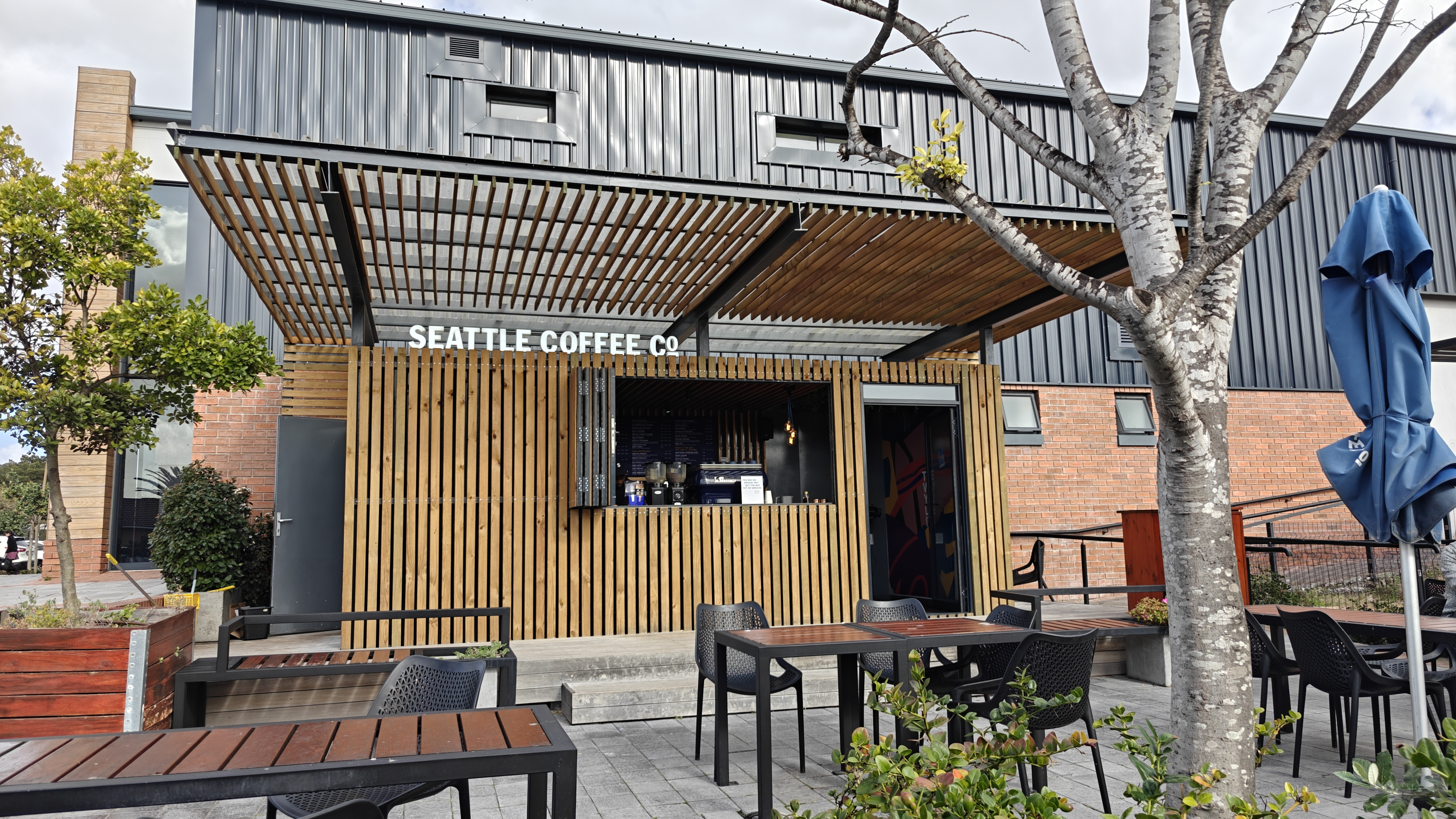
- Store in Bothasig, Cape Town
- Type: Subsidiary
- Industry: Coffeehouse chain
- Founded: 1993; 33 years ago
- Headquarters: Cape Town, South Africa
- Number of locations: 297 (2025)
- Areas served: South Africa; Namibia
- Key people: Pete Howie and Barry Parker (Co-Founders of SA operations)
- Products: Coffee and coffee capsules
- Services: Coffeehouses
- Parent: Food Lover's Market
- Website: seattlecoffeecompany.co.za

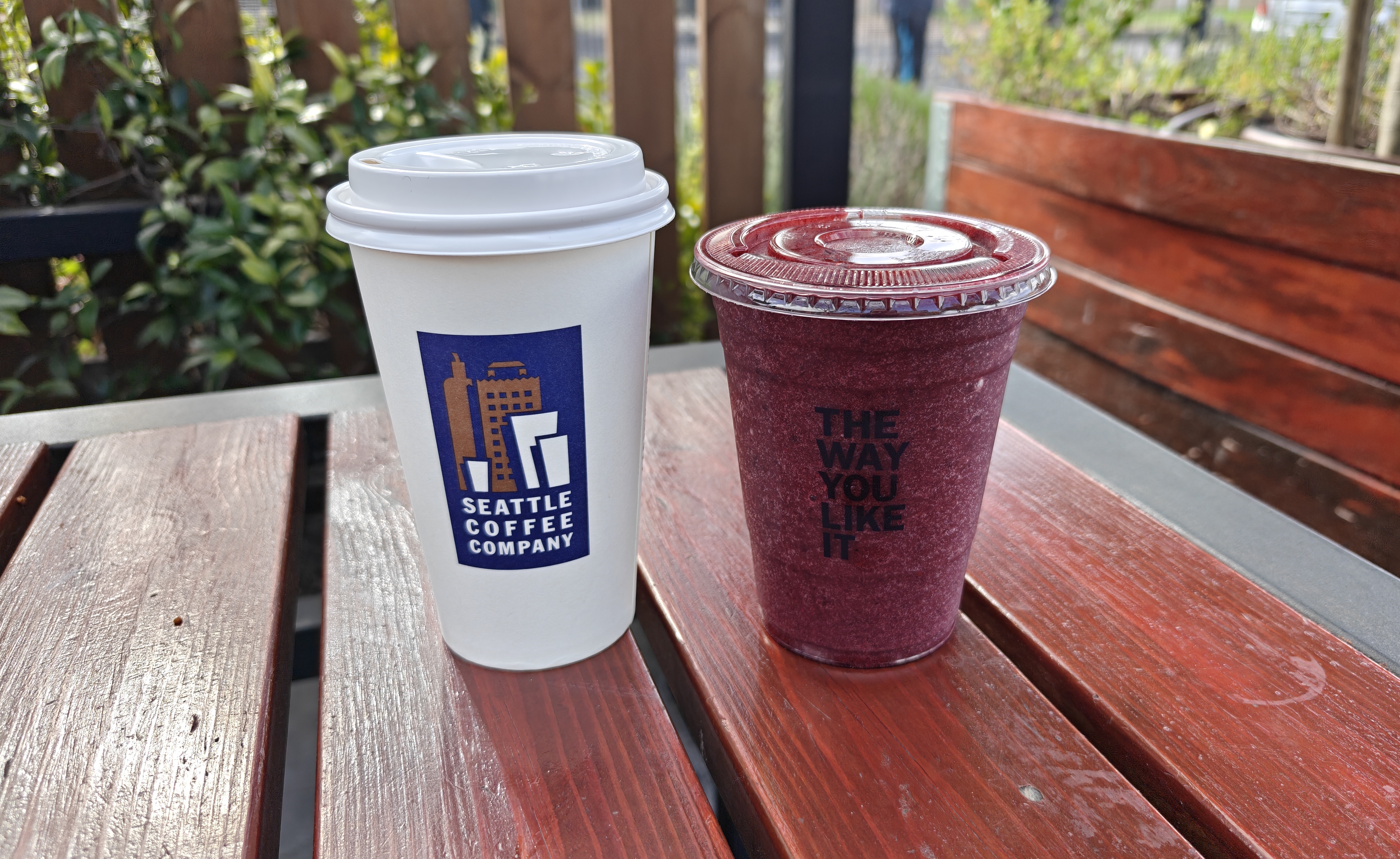
Seattle drinks at a store in Cape Town

Seattle Coffee Company (often simply referred to as Seattle) is a South African café chain, and supplier of beverage products.

Headquartered in Cape Town, Seattle is one of South Africa's largest café chains. The company operates around 300 stores across five South African provinces, as well as eight stores in Namibia.

Since 2015, Seattle has been owned by major South African supermarket chain Food Lover's Market. As of November 2025, 126 Seattle outlets are situated at Astron Energy gas stations, via the latter's partnership with Food Lover's-owned convenience store chain FreshStop. Seattle also has outlets at select Sasol gas stations.

== History ==
Seattle was initially founded in 1993, by Alley and Scott Svenson (from Seattle, USA), as a specialty coffeehouse in London, UK. However, the UK entity has since dissolved (having been sold to Starbucks), and Seattle Coffee Co is a South African, family-run business.

Seattle Coffee Company's presence in South Africa began in 1997, when friends Pete Howie and Barry Parker opened the first local store in the mixed-use suburb of Claremont, in Cape Town.

The company was the first café chain in South Africa to offer counter-service coffee, offer custom coffee orders, serve coffee in paper cups, and ban smoking in stores.

During the early 2000s, in order to save on the import costs of beans from the UK, and to serve fresher coffee, Seattle partnered with London-based Union Hand-Roasted Coffee to move its bean roasting process to South Africa. Seattle gained access to farms that Union had direct trade relationships with, and the latter also helped train Seattle's roasters via apprenticeships in the UK, and through conducting training in South Africa.

In 2015, major South African supermarket chain, Food Lover's Market, bought Seattle Coffee Co.

In 2023, as part of a broader growth strategy across its brands, Food Lover's announced its intention to reach a total of 500 Seattle outlets.

In 2022, major South African petroleum company, Sasol, announced that it had partnered with Seattle, and that the latter would open up to 100 outlets at selected Sasol Delight convenience stores across South Africa by 2025.

== Operations ==
As of 2025, Seattle owns around 300 stores, located across South Africa and Namibia.

Seattle sells a variety of coffee products, including beans and capsules, under its own brand name. Its cafés also serve food.

The company roasts its own beans at its roastery in Muizenberg, Cape Town.

== Sustainability ==
To reduce the prevalence of single-use coffee cups, Seattle offers a discount on drinks if customers bring their own travel mugs. The company also has reusable plastic splash sticks, glass straws, and metal and wooden spoons.

== See also ==
- Retailing in South Africa
