= Astron Energy =

South African petroleum company

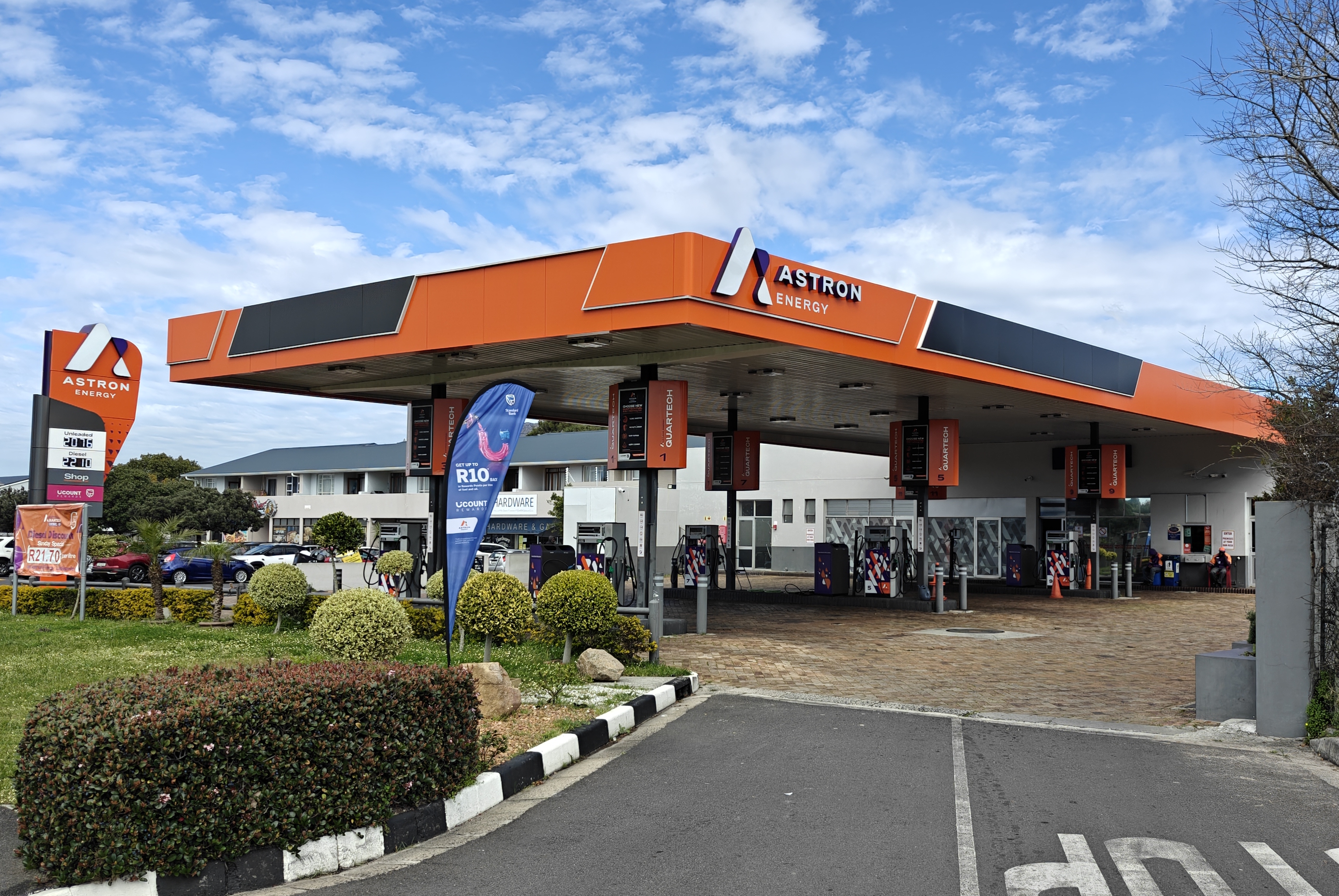
- Modern Astron Energy gas station in Bergvliet, Cape Town
- Type: Private company
- Industry: Petroleum
- Predecessor: Caltex Oil (SA)
- Founded: 1911; 115 years ago
- Headquarters: Cape Town (Western Cape), South Africa
- Number of locations: 850+ (2025)
- Area served: South Africa; Botswana
- Key people: Thabiet Booley (CEO)
- Products: Petroleum
- Brands: Quartech; Havoline; Delo
- Services: Petroleum refining Gas stations Convenience stores
- Owner: Glencore (68%)
- Website: astronenergy.co.za

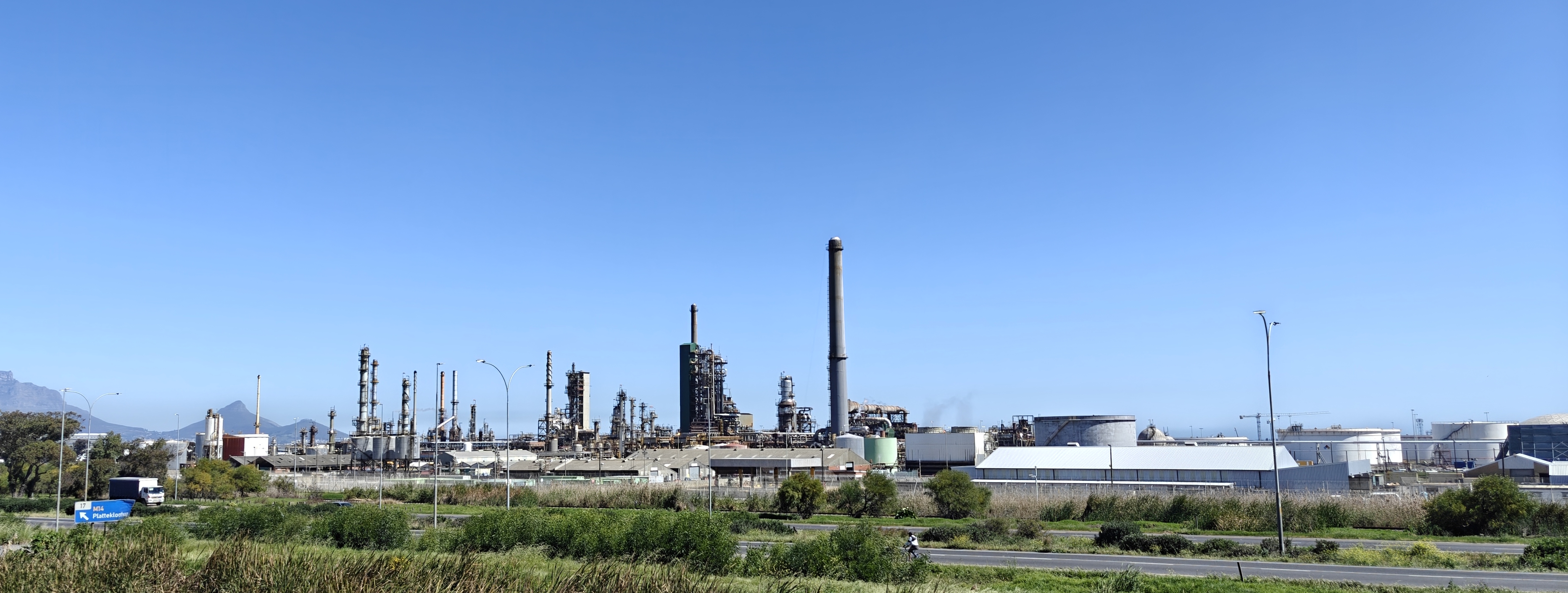
The Astron Energy Refinery in Milnerton, Cape Town

Astron Energy (often simply referred to as Astron) is a major South African petroleum company, based in Cape Town.

With over 850 gas stations, Astron is South Africa's second-largest consumer gas retailer. The company also operates gas stations in Botswana, as well as an oil refinery in Cape Town (the second-largest in South Africa), and a lubricant manufacturing plant in Durban.

== History ==
Astron was founded in 1911, originally called the Texaco Company (South Africa), and imported its first crude oil cargo into South Africa in the same year.

In 1936, the Caltex brand rolled out in South Africa. This was enabled by the creation of Chevron South Africa, via a joint venture between Texaco and Standard Oil of California (which later became Chevron).

In 1966, the Caltex Refinery was constructed in Milnerton, Cape Town. It is still in operation, under the Astron brand.

In 2017, Swiss mining and commodity trading company, Glencore, bought Chevron's Southern African assets for R1 billion. Glencore then began major infrastructure upgrades on the Astron Refinery.

As part of an agreement with the South African Competition Tribunal and the Department of Economic Development, Glencore agreed to invest R6 billion in the Astron Refinery and related projects.

In 2018, Astron Energy began operating the Caltex brand under a license agreement with Chevron.

In September 2022, Astron revealed its new gas station design, and began a gradual rebranding of Caltex locations across South Africa and Botswana to Astron Energy. The first locations to receive the upgrades were MACS in Brooklyn, Cape Town; Nandi in eThekweni, KZN; Chuenespoort, along the R37, in Limpopo, and KwaMakhuta in Amanzimtoti, KZN.

In July 2025, Astron unveiled its 500th rebranded gas station.

== Operations ==
=== Retail ===
As of 2025, Astron operates over 850 gas stations across South Africa and Botswana, which include retail gas and diesel (under its Quartech brand), as well as convenience stores and cafes. The company uses a franchise model for its gas stations.

Astron gas stations partner with FreshStop convenience stores and Seattle Coffee outlets, both owned by major South African supermarket chain, Food Lover's Market, which previously operated the same two brands in partnership with Caltex.

Astron also partners with Standard Bank, a major South African financial institution, for the bank's UCount Rewards program.

The company's gas stations cost around R4 million to establish, excluding stock, as well as a further roughly R2 million in working capital. Such a station has the ability to serve a volume of 330,000 kiloliters per month, and generate an estimated R1 million to R1.3 million in revenue per month.

As of 2025, Astron's gas station distribution included 164 in Gauteng, 123 in the Western Cape, and 77 in KwaZulu-Natal.

=== Manufacturing ===
Astron also owns a major oil refinery (formerly the Caltex Refinery), located in Milnerton, Cape Town. It is the country's second-largest refinery of its kind, and has an output capacity of 100,000 barrels per day. The refinery produces petroleum, diesel, jet fuel, liquefied gas, and other specialty products for use in the Western Cape, as well as for African export markets.

In mid-2026, the refinery was estimated to generate R95 billion in revenue for the local economy, and support over 50,000 direct and indirect jobs.

Astron also owns a lubricant manufacturing facility in Durban, which produces, among others, its Havoline and Delo brands. The facility has the capacity to produce 60 million liters of lubricants per year.

== Corporate social responsibility ==
Astron has a Level 1 BBBEE status, with 60% of its board members and 86% of its total workforce being black South Africans (of which 35% are black women). Furthermore, around half of Astron's crude oil is procured from black-owned companies.

Through its Astron Energy Development Fund (AEDF), Astron aims to support the establishment and growth of sustainable local SMMEs, with a preference for those from previously disadvantaged groups. It does so through procurement, funding, and development opportunities, via 3 flagship programs.

== See also ==
- Astron Energy Refinery
- Petroleum industry in South Africa
- List of oil exploration and production companies
