= Cognician =

E-learning platform

- Website type: Online education
- Available in: English
- Founded: Cape Town, South Africa (April, 2010)
- Headquarters: Cape Town, South Africa
- Area served: Worldwide
- Creators: Barry Kayton; Patrick Kayton
- Industry: E-learning
- Employees: 42
- Website: www.cognician.com
- Written in: Clojure

Cognician is a web-based, e-learning platform for personal development and organisational development produced by Cognician Software (Pty) Ltd. The company is located in Cape Town, South Africa, and San Jose, California, and was founded by brothers Barry Kayton and Patrick Kayton in 2010.

== Overview ==
Cognician is an online software platform that allows users to explore a particular topic by guiding them through an interactive question-and-answer process inspired by the Socratic method and the theory of cognitive apprenticeship. Content is packaged in applets called coaching guides, or cogs for short. Each cog consists of two complementary parts: a series of questions designed to provoke higher-order thinking and a sidebar that contains supporting material in the form of text, images or video. Users respond to the questions in the chat space, which is designed to resemble an IRC. However the chat is not a live, synchronous chat. It is a pre-scripted, structured conversation which gives users a thinking agenda and enables them to develop their thoughts on the topic. Cogs are similar to workbooks in that they bring structure to a complex activity, but the experience of using a cog has the semblance of a live conversation with a person.

== Management ==
The Cognician management team consists of Barry Kayton and Patrick Kayton who are CEO in the USA and UK respectively and Robert Stuttaford (CTO). Cognician's employees include software developers (responsible for the platform), researchers, writers and editors (responsible for content development), and graphic designers (responsible for what users see when interacting with the platform). In this respect, Cognician is a typical Digital Content Creation (DCC) business.

== Architecture ==
Cognician's core business logic, website, web application and backend systems are implemented using Clojure. Cognician uses Datomic, a distributed database also built with Clojure, as well as Memcached for transitory cache and RabbitMQ for message queuing. Cognician hosts on Amazon EC2 and Amazon S3.

== History ==
The idea for Cognician came from a seminar in creative thinking that Barry Kayton was running at the Graduate School of Business at the University of Cape Town in 2006. The Kayton brothers worked part-time developing a prototype of the Cognician platform, initially investing their own money in the project and later raising seed capital from angel investors.

In January 2010, at the Geek Retreat in Stanford, the Kayton brothers decided that Cognician would no longer be a stealth startup. In February 2010, Robert Stuttaford joined as CTO and began building Cognician as an Adobe AIR Application. In its earliest alpha version, Cognician took the form of a mind map and the company founders described the app as a kind of extended mind. In April 2010, Cognician was officially registered as a company in Cape Town, South Africa. The company has set up subsidiaries in the United States (San Carlos, CA) and the United Kingdom (London).

== Awards and recognition ==
In 2010, Cognician received local and international recognition at the Cape Town Activa Awards, Seedcamp Johannesburg, the Seedcamp London finals and by being named one of Europe's top 11 startups at the TechCrunch Europas Awards. In August 2013, the Kayton brothers were among 17 high impact entrepreneurs selected by Endeavor to join its global network of entrepreneurs. In October 2014, Cognician's Leadership Accelerator program received the Best Soft Skills Solution award at DevLearn's DemoFest in Las Vegas. In February 2017, Recruiting Daily selected Cognician as one of the top 100 HR technologies and recruiting tools worth watching in Q1 2017.

== Pivot ==
Cognician's initial aim was to work with publishers to adapt non-fiction books into cogs for the consumer market (B2C). In March 2011, Cognician launched their first book-to-cog adaption which was based on The Decision book by Mikael Krogerus and Roman Tschäppeler. But the company soon found traction selling to enterprises (B2B) and decided to pivot. In July 2011 the company signed its first enterprise contract with The Allan Gray Orbis Foundation for the creation of 120 cogs aimed at developing high impact leaders and entrepreneurs among its fellows. Other clients followed, including De Beers, DNV-GL, Incitec Pivot Limited, Lloyds Register, Rodan + Fields, Diageo, Suntory Global Spirits, Dimension Data, Cindy Solomon & Associates, The Allan Gray Orbis Foundation, Allan Gray Limited, Rand Merchant Bank, Standard Bank, Competitive Capabilities International, Telkom and others.
