= Stitch Money =

South African fintech company

- Type: Private
- Industry: Fintech
- Founded: 2019; 7 years ago
- Founders: Kiaan Pillay, Priyen Pillay, Natalie Cuthbert, Junaid Dadan
- Headquarters: Cape Town, South Africa
- Area served: Africa
- Website: stitch.money

Stitch is a South African payment gateway and payments infrastructure business that provides open access to multiple payments solutions, to businesses of all sizes, from large enterprises to small and growing e-commerce and retail merchants. The company's headquarters are located in Cape Town, South Africa.

== History ==
In 2019, Stitch was founded in Cape Town, South Africa as Stitch Money.

In February 2021, Stitch emerged from stealth, having raised $4 million in seed funding. The initial focus of Stitch was on enabling businesses to access user financial accounts to view financial data.

In April 2021, the company began piloting its first payments product – Pay-ins.

In October 2021, the company raised a $2 million seed extension.

In November 2021, Stitch pivoted fully into payments and launched its first payment method, Pay by bank.

In February 2022, Stitch raised $21 million in Series A funding, led by New York-based long-term investment firm The Spruce House Partnership, for its API infrastructure and embedded finance platform.

In April 2022, Stitch launched LinkPay – a first-in-market Pay by bank solution that allowed users to link their bank accounts so they could make one-click returning payments.

In July 2022, Stitch launched its Payouts product, enabling businesses to send money to any domestic bank account in South Africa.

In November 2022, Stitch launched manual EFT, extending their payments offering beyond a single-method solution.

In February 2023, Stitch launched cash as a payment method for digital services, and became one of the first PSPs in South Africa to offer Capitec Pay, the first direct bank API launched in South Africa.

In March 2023 Stitch evolved into an end-to-end payment services provider (PSP), adding card payments, debit orders, and payment orchestration to their existing payments offering.

In September 2023, Stitch announced its first spin-out brand, WigWag, offering payment links and other services for SMEs, startups and mid-sized businesses.

In November 2023, Stitch launched Pay with crypto, enabling consumers to make payments to merchants directly from popular cryptocurrency wallets such as Binance, Valr and Luno, settling the merchants in ZAR.

In July 2024, Stitch launched digital wallet payments, including Apple Pay, Google Pay, and Samsung Pay, through one integration.

In January 2025, Stitch announced its acquisition of ExiPay, which allowed them to add in-person payments to their offering and expand their client base to include in-person businesses, online businesses and omnichannel businesses.

In February 2025, WigWag was brought back under the Stitch umbrella as Stitch Express, offering payment plug-ins for e-commerce businesses that operate on platforms such as Shopify, Woo, Squarespace and Webflow.

In April 2025, Stitch announced a Series B funding round of $55 million, bringing their total funding raised to $107 million. The round was led by global investment firms QED Investors, Glynn Capital, Flourish Ventures and Norrsken22, with participation from existing funders Ribbit Capital, PayPal Ventures, The Raba Partnership and Firstminute Capital.

In July 2025, Stitch acquired Efficacy Payments, a company designated as a clearing system participant in 2021. The acquisition allowed Stitch to offer card acquiring services directly to merchants, with direct card clearing both online and in person.

In December 2025, Stitch and Capitec Bank launched variable recurring payments (VRP) through Capitec Pay, allowing merchants to collect recurring payments of varying amounts from Capitec accounts within a limit authorised by the customer.

In May 2026, Stitch launched a buy now, pay later product for merchants, available online and in store. Customers pay in instalments while merchants receive the full purchase amount within 24 hours.

In August 2026, Stitch went live with PayShap Request, the request-to-pay feature of South Africa's PayShap real-time payment system, using a multi-acquirer setup across the major local banks. The same month, Stitch Express launched in-person payments, including an integration with Shopify POS that syncs in-store orders and payments with a merchant's online store.

== Products ==
Stitch offers a variety of payment solutions for enterprise and e-commerce customers, including:

Online payments using a wide range of methods including card; Pay by bank direct bank APIs such as Capitec Pay, Absa Pay and Nedbank Direct EFT; PayShap Request; debit order; DebiCheck; digital wallets (such as Apple Pay, Google Pay, and Samsung Pay); buy now, pay later; cash and Pay with crypto.

In-person payments, including card present and alternative payment methods such as Pay by bank and Pay with crypto. Following their acquisition of ExiPay, Stitch is able to offer device-agnostic in-person payments solutions.

Card acquiring. Following the acquisition of Efficacy Payments, a designated clearing system participant, the Stitch group acts as a payment gateway, switch and card acquirer, offering merchants direct card clearing online and in person.

Stitch also offers 24/7, 365 days a year, instant payouts, including withdrawals, refunds and disbursements. They also offer a float facility that allows customers to more easily manage their payouts and cashflow.

Stitch Express offers payments plugins for e-commerce businesses that leverage platforms like Shopify, WooCommerce, SquareSpace, Webflow, and others.

Stitch Express also offers in-person payments through a standalone card terminal, a Shopify POS integration or an API for custom point-of-sale systems.
