= Stodels =

South African retail chain

- Type: Private
- Industry: Retail; Garden centers
- Founded: 1962; 64 years ago
- Founder: Robert Stodel
- Headquarters: Bellville (City of Cape Town), Western Cape, South Africa
- Number of locations: 7 (2026)
- Areas served: South Africa
- Key people: Nick Stodel (CEO)
- Products: Plants; Flowers; Gardening equipment
- Website: stodels.com

Stodels is a South African garden centre retailer, operating a chain of garden centers in two of the country's provinces (the Western Cape, and Gauteng).

Headquartered in Bellville, Western Cape, the company has been operating since 1962.

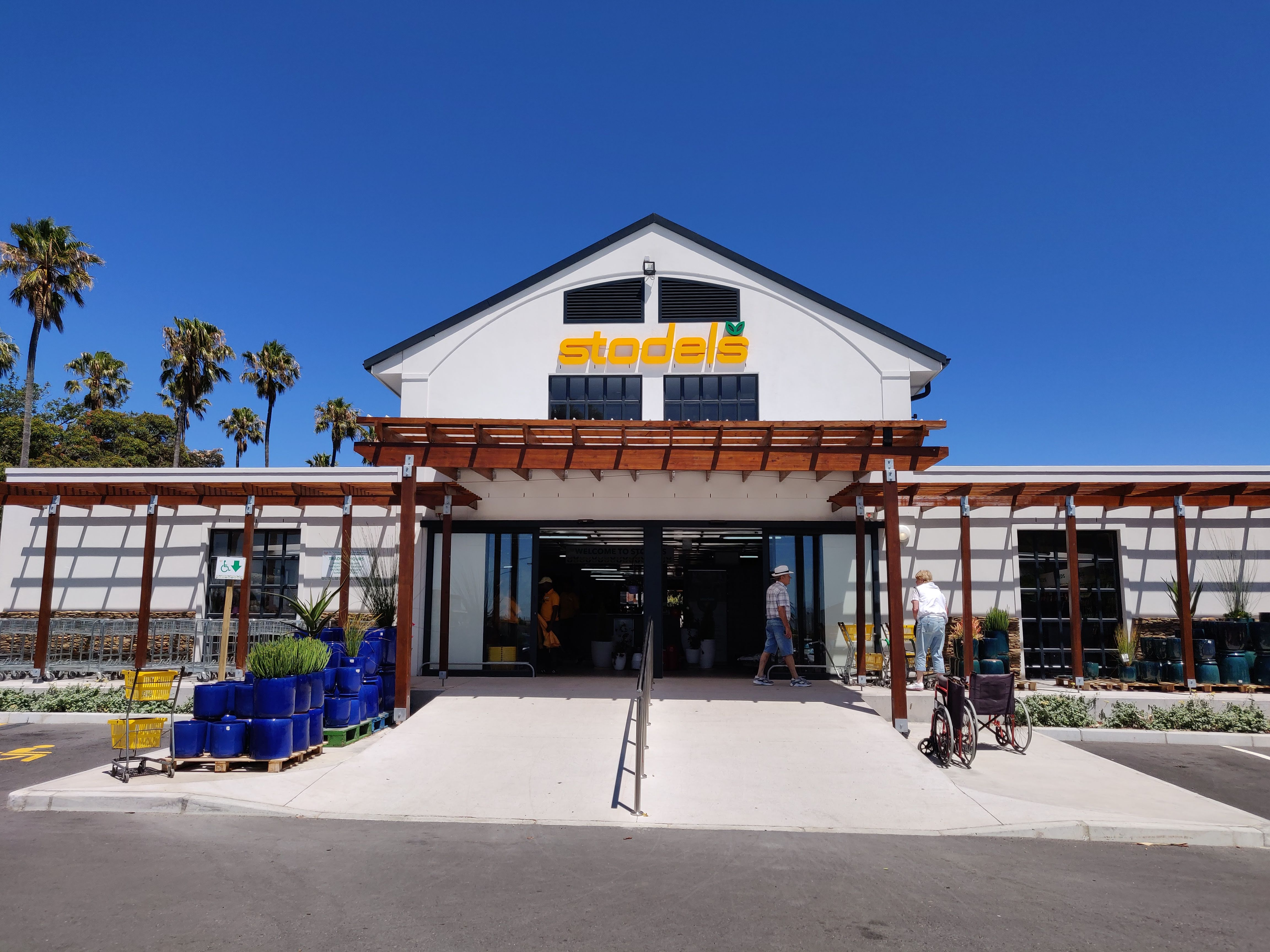
Entrance of Stodels garden center in Bergvliet, Cape Town, South Africa

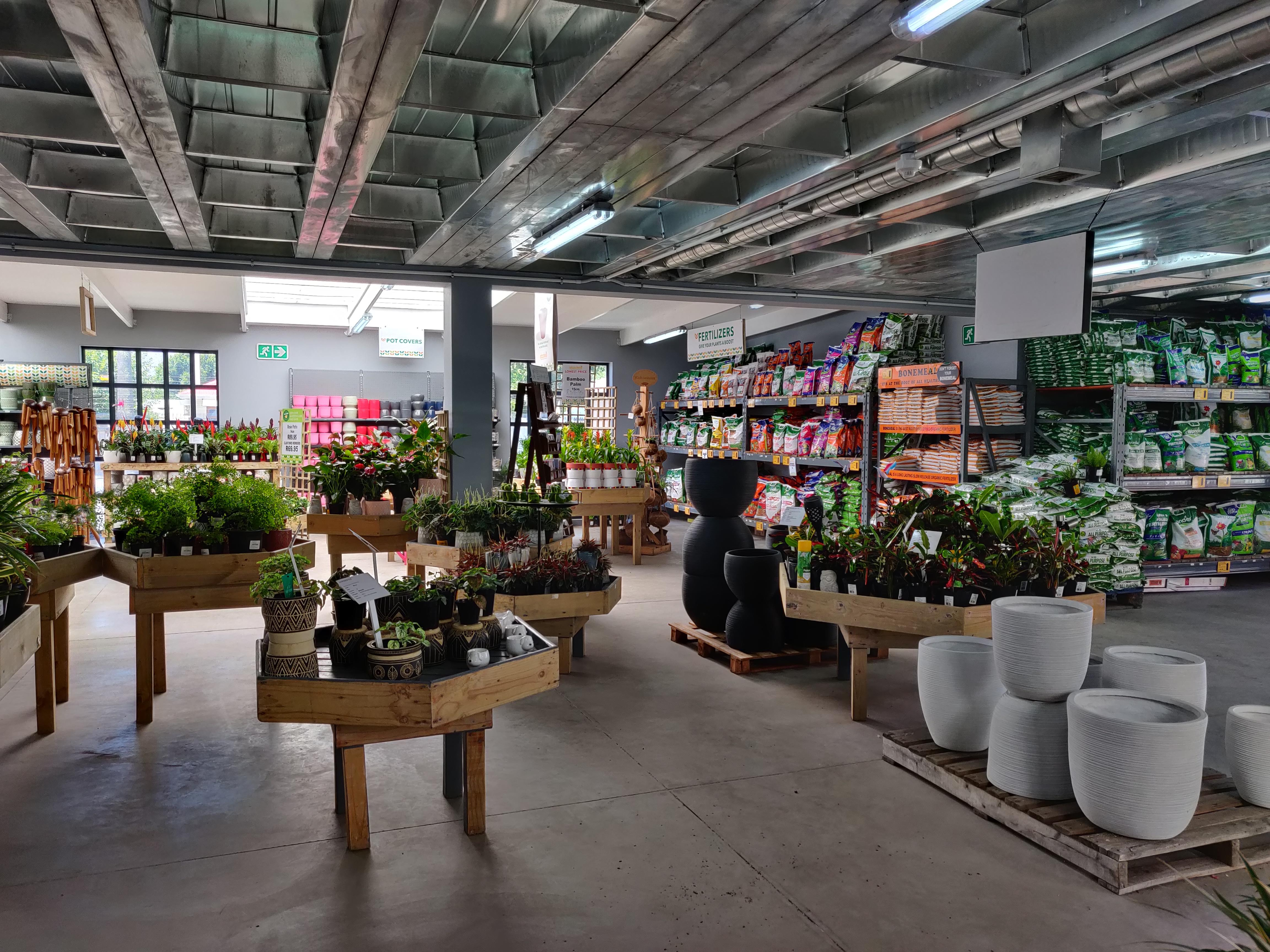
Interior of a Stodels garden center

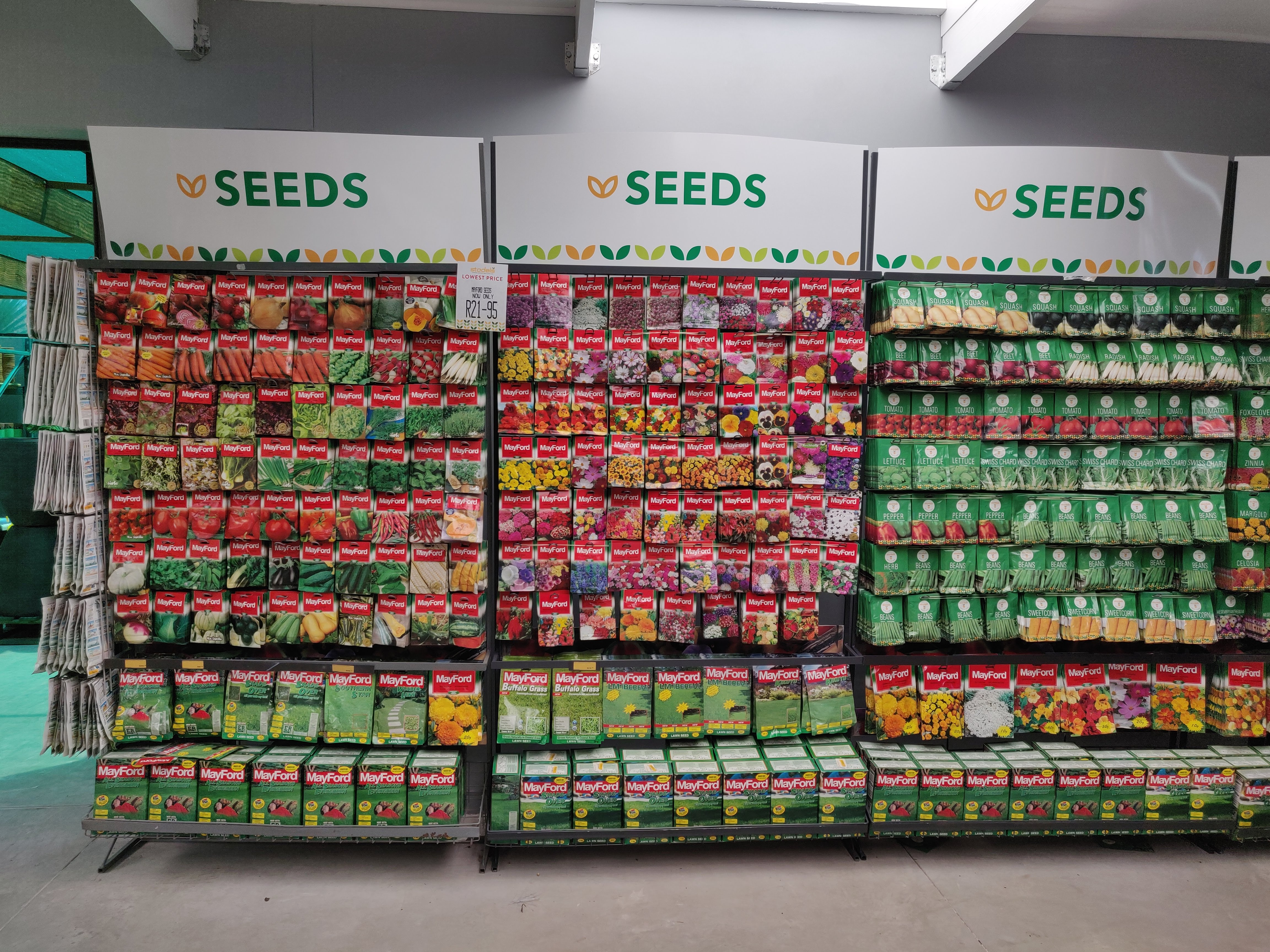
Seed wall inside a Stodels garden center

== History ==
Stodels was established in Cape Town, South Africa, in 1962, when founder Robert Stodel began making sales through a mail-order catalogue, door-to-door visits, and out of his van on the Grand Parade in Cape Town.

The first Stodels garden centre opened in 1968, in the residential suburb of Kenilworth, Cape Town followed by the opening of a Stodels Bellville garden centre in 1973, where the company's headquarters are situated today.

In 2006, Robert Stodel's son, Nick Stodel, took over the business, thereafter opening 5 more garden centres.

In 2011, Nick became the President of the South African Nursery Association (SANA), and was the first President of the International Garden Centre Association (IGCA) to be elected from the African continent and the Southern Hemisphere.

In March 2012, Stodels opened a garden centre in the Cape Town residential suburb of Constantia, which was later replaced by a garden centre in Bergvliet.

In August 2012, the company opened a garden center in Somerset West.

== Operations ==
The company has seven garden centers, located across two provinces in South Africa.

Stodels sells, among other things, outdoor and indoor plants, seeds, soil, and plant-related decor items, such as pots.

The retailer also operates Stodels Cafés at some of its locations, serving food and drinks.

Stodels operates a free loyalty program called Stodels Garden Club, providing clients who register with discounts on garden center purchases, points for purchases, gifts, and discounts at Stodels Cafés.

== Awards ==
Stodels has won numerous South African Nursery Association Independent Garden Centre Awards. Those include Best Garden Centre in South Africa in 2013, and again in 2022, as well as the Cape Regional Award, which Stodels has received every year since 2009.

In 2017, the company's CEO, Nick Stodel, was presented with a South African Nursery Association Gold Award, the highest honour in the industry.

== See also ==
- Retail
- Garden center
