= Afrigen =

South African pharmaceutical company

Afrigen Biologics and Vaccines
- Type: Private
- Industry: Biotech
- Founded: 2014; 12 years ago
- Headquarters: Montague Gardens, Cape Town, South Africa
- Key people: Mehmet Levent Selamoglu (Chairperson); Petro Terblanche (CEO)
- Products: Vaccines
- Owner: Avacare South Africa; The Industrial Development Corporation of South Africa
- Website: afrigen.co.za

Afrigen (officially Afrigen Biologics and Vaccines) is a South African biotech company, based in Cape Town.

== History ==
Afrigen was founded in 2014, as a partnership between the Infectious Disease Research Institute (IDRI), which was a non-government organization registered in the USA, and later transformed to the Access to Advanced Health Initiative (AAHI), and the Industrial Development Corporation of South Africa (IDC).

In November 2017, Avacare Health acquired the IDRI stake in Afrigen.

In February 2022, Afrigen was the world's first company to manufacture an mRNA COVID-19 vaccine using a publicly available sequence from a different manufacturer. The vaccine was made using Moderna's data.

Major pharmaceutical companies Pfizer, BioNTech, and Moderna all declined the WHO's request to share their technology to expand vaccine access. As a result, the WHO chose a consortium, including Afrigen, for a pilot project to give poor and middle-income countries the knowledge to make COVID vaccines themselves. Afrigen also agreed to help train companies in Argentina and Brazil.

As of 2023, Afrigen had developed a COVID-19 vaccine, and was working on mRNA vaccines for tuberculosis and HIV.

In January 2025, it was announced that Afrigen is pioneering research which aims to develop the first mRNA-based vaccine against Rift Valley fever, a mosquito-borne disease affecting countries across Africa and the Middle East. This research is backed by a R116 million grant from the Norway-based foundation, the Coalition for Epidemic Preparedness Innovations (CEPI).

== Operations ==
Afrigen operates from 6 customized warehouses that house research and product development labs, GMP vaccine manufacturing, GMP active ingredient production for health and wellness products, quality control labs, product stability testing, a compounding pharmacy, as well as warehousing for raw materials and products.

== Funding ==
Afrigen's funding comes from numerous organizations, including the World Health Organization (WHO) and the Medicines Patent Pool (MPP).
