= WeBuyCars =

South African automotive group

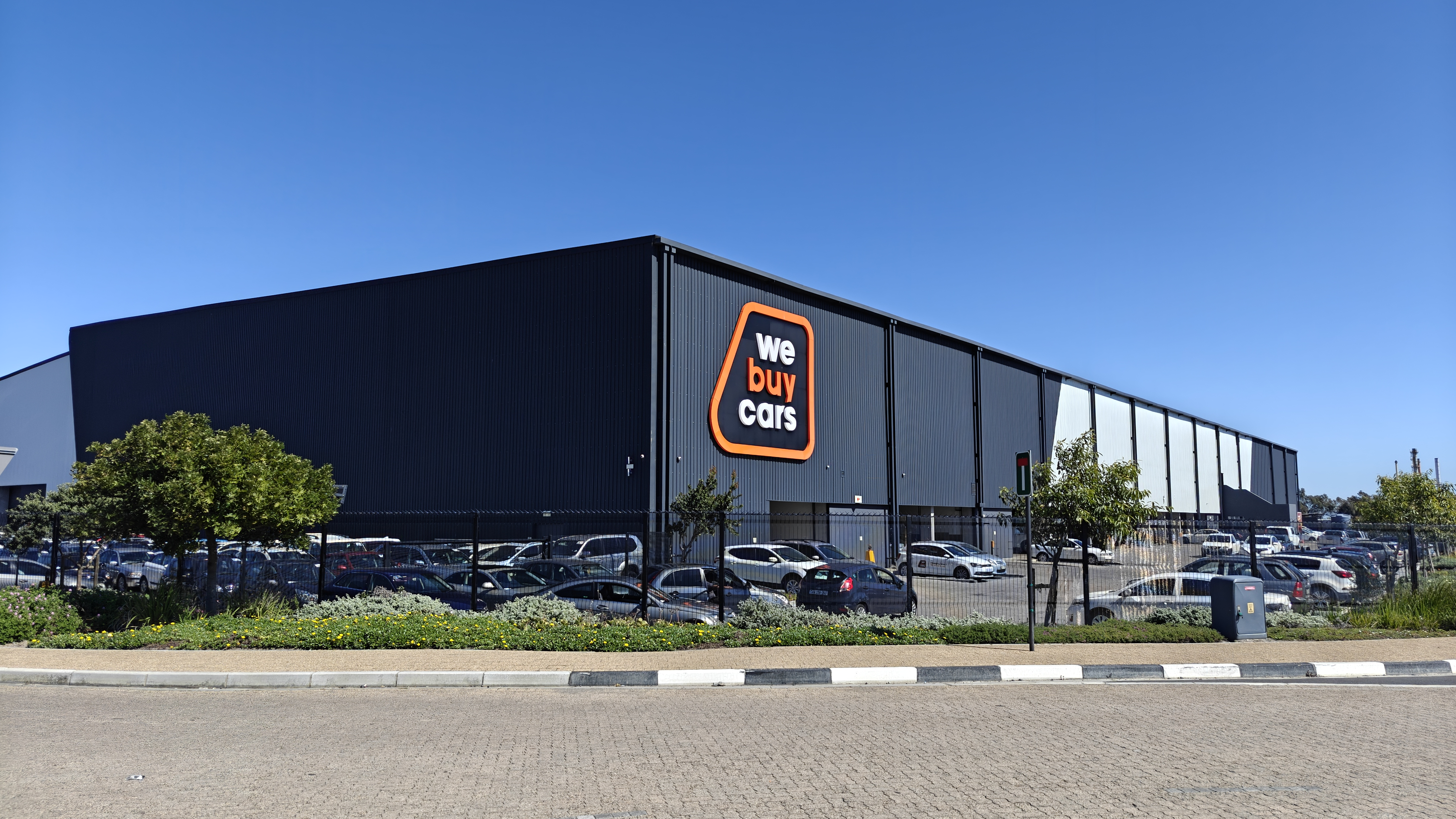
- WeBuyCars warehouse and showroom in Montague Gardens, Cape Town
- Trade name: We Buy Cars Holdings Ltd
- Type: Public
- Traded as: JSE: WBC
- ISIN: ZAE000332789
- Industry: Automotive; Pre-owned vehicles
- Founded: 2001; 25 years ago
- Headquarters: Centurion, South Africa
- Number of locations: 124 (2025)
- Area served: South Africa
- Key people: Faan and Dirk van der Walt (Co-Founders); ASS van der Walt (CEO); JA Holtzhausen (Chairman)
- Revenue: ▲ R26.37 billion (2025)
- Operating income: ▲ R1.49 billion (2025)
- Net income: ▲ R937 million (2025)
- Total assets: ▲ R5.35 billion (2025)
- Total equity: ▲ R3.05 billion (2025)
- Number of employees: 3,562 (2025)
- Website: www.webuycars.co.za

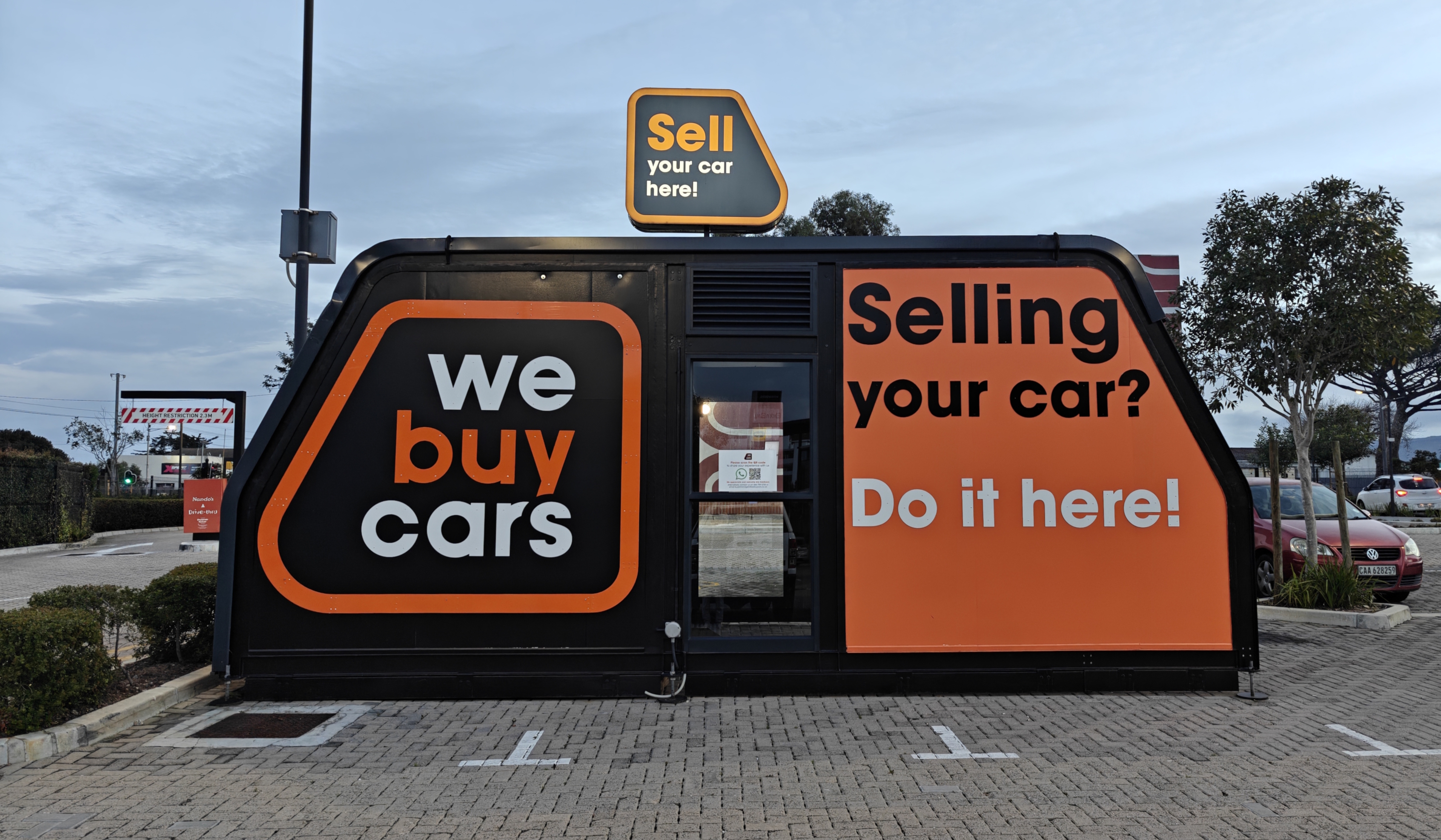
WeBuyCars Pod at 3Arts Village, in Plumstead, Cape Town

WeBuyCars (officially We Buy Cars Holdings Ltd, and sometimes stylized in lowercase) is a South African non-manufacturing automotive company. Founded in 2001, the company is headquartered in Centurion, Gauteng.

The group sells pre-owned vehicles of various kinds, across South Africa, via its warehouses, pods, and customer visit system. The latter involves an assessor traveling to a place of convenience for the potential client, and if an agreement is reached, buying the car on the spot. WeBuyCars also facilitates vehicle trade-ins, insurance, and finance.

As of late 2024, the company is listed on the JSE Limited, South Africa's largest stock exchange. It competes with GetWorth - another South African automotive company that sells cars via similar formats - as well as traditional vehicle dealerships.

== History ==
WeBuyCars was founded in 2001, by brothers Faan and Dirk van der Walt. The company was initially located in Pretoria East.

In 2010, the company had grown to the point where it established its own warehouse in Pretoria, with space for around 100 vehicles. A few months later, the group bought the plot next door to gain more space for trading.

After facilitating all sales themselves from the company's inception, in 2012, the founders hired their first vehicle buyers. More buyers were appointed, this time in Cape Town, in 2014. Other major South African cities followed not long after.

WeBuyCars opened branches in Cape Town and Durban in 2016 and 2017 respectively. 2017 also saw the opening of the company's Car Supermarket in Midstream, with storage for 1,100 vehicles. In March of the same year, the founders sold a significant amount of their shares to Fledge Capital. Fledge provided expertise to help WeBuyCars modernize, and rapidly grow its operations.

In 2018, the company opened its second warehouse, which was located in Cape Town. In December 2018, WeBuyCars opened a warehouse in Johannesburg South.

Also in 2018, the company was still tracking its inventory and sales using Google Sheets.

In 2019, the company opened a new warehouse in Gqeberha, as well as its second warehouse in Durban. In December 2019, WeBuyCars reached 1,000 employees. In the same month, the company opened a new purpose-built showroom in Cape Town.

In 2020, South African diversified holdings company, Naspers, attempted to buy a 60% stake in WeBuyCars for R1.4 billion, via its online advertising business, OLX (which sells vehicles, among other things). However, the deal was blocked by the South African Competition Commission.

The Commission said that there would be less competition in the South African automotive market if the sale went through, in part because Naspers' platforms OLX and AutoTrader were source of vehicles for WeBuyCars. Naspers had considered entering the market to compete with WeBuyCars directly, through an investment in Frontier Car Group Inc (FCG), but paused the plan prior to the acquisition attempt.

Later in 2020, JSE-listed Transaction Capital bought a non-controlling 49.9% shareholding in WeBuyCars for R1.8 billion. This stake later increased to 74.9%, with the remaining 25.1% held by the family trusts of WeBuyCars' founders.

In July 2020, WeBuyCars launched public auctions on its website. The company also began issuing a Dekra report for pre-owned vehicles with all the cars it sold.

WeBuyCars opened a new super-showroom in Johannesburg, in December 2021. After purchasing the former Ticketpro Dome from the Sasol Pension Fund, the WeBuyCars Dome became one of the largest pre-owned vehicle salesrooms in the world. The Dome has a capacity of around 2,000 vehicles, including an underground test area for aquatic vehicles.

In early 2024, Traction Capital announced its intention to unbundle WeBuyCars, and list it separately on the JSE (South Africa's main stock exchange). The transition was completed later that year.

In May 2025, WeBuyCars announced that it had relocated its Pietermaritzburg showroom to a larger site, and expanded capacity at its George, Polokwane, Joburg South, Dome, Riverhorse Valley, and Gqeberha facilities. The company also said that trading was anticipated to begin at its new Vereeniging showroom in August 2025, and at its new Lansdowne and Montana showrooms in December 2025. Furthermore, at the time, WeBuyCars announced it had reached a monthly sales record of 16,294 vehicles in November 2024.

In June 2025, WeBuyCars announced that it was considering selling new vehicles. The company stated that numerous vehicle manufacturers had reached out to enquire about supplying the company with new vehicles to sell. The following month, the company stated that around 30% of people who sell vehicles to WeBuyCars subsequently purchase brand new vehicles - a service that the company did not yet offer, but was actively investigating.

In July 2025, the company announced that it had begun using an AI system, called Blue, to purchase vehicles without any human intervention. Blue is a collection of machine learning models that contains all the proprietary information and pricing models of WeBuyCars. It then uses this info to conduct valuations autonomously. At the time of reporting, Blue had already bought 2,800 vehicles autonomously.

In the same month, the company announced its intention to almost double its monthly average car purchases, and double its number of buying stations across South Africa, by 2028. WeBuyCars further stated its intention to add to its operations a 550-vehicle facility in Vereeniging, a 1,300-vehicle facility in Cape Town, and a 1,300-vehicle facility in Pretoria.

In August 2025, it was reported that WeBuyCars was one of South Africa's largest vehicle marketplaces, with its website generating an average of 8.7 million viewers per month. At the time, the company had 18 showrooms and over 100 pods across the country, and was selling around 15,000 vehicles per month.

In February 2026, WeBuyCars' share price reduced dropped precipitously, with a 16.75% reducing the company's market capitalization from R22.09 billion to R18.39 billion. This was seen to be in response to numerous factors, including the January 2026 National Consumer Commission (NCC) ruling against the company's business practices, which resulted in WeBuyCars paying an administrative penalty, as well as redress to consumers. Other factors included an increasingly competitive market (as a result of popular, affordable Chinese new vehicle manufacturers entering the SA automotive market), as well as general strong shifts in the South African new car market.

The month before, WeBuyCars co-founders and co-CEOs Faan and Dirk van der Walt sold R866.4 million worth of shares in the company. Their stated reasoning was that the sale was part of their personal investment diversification. However, on 20 November 2025, Dirk van der Walt bought 450,000 WeBuyCars shares. So, after the February 2026 share sale, some investors questioned why the two co-founders would sell their shares at that time, given that Dirk had bought R20.5 million in shares less than three months prior. Some investors posited that the Van der Walt brothers were not as fully committed to the company as WeBuyCars' statement suggested.

Irrespective of the reasoning, the company's share price decreased from R52.85 on 23 January 2026 to R44.00 on 3 February 2026. Hence, WeBuyCars' market cap declined from R22.09 billion to R18.39 billion within a period of trading days, which was a R3.7 billion decrease in the company's value.

== Operations ==
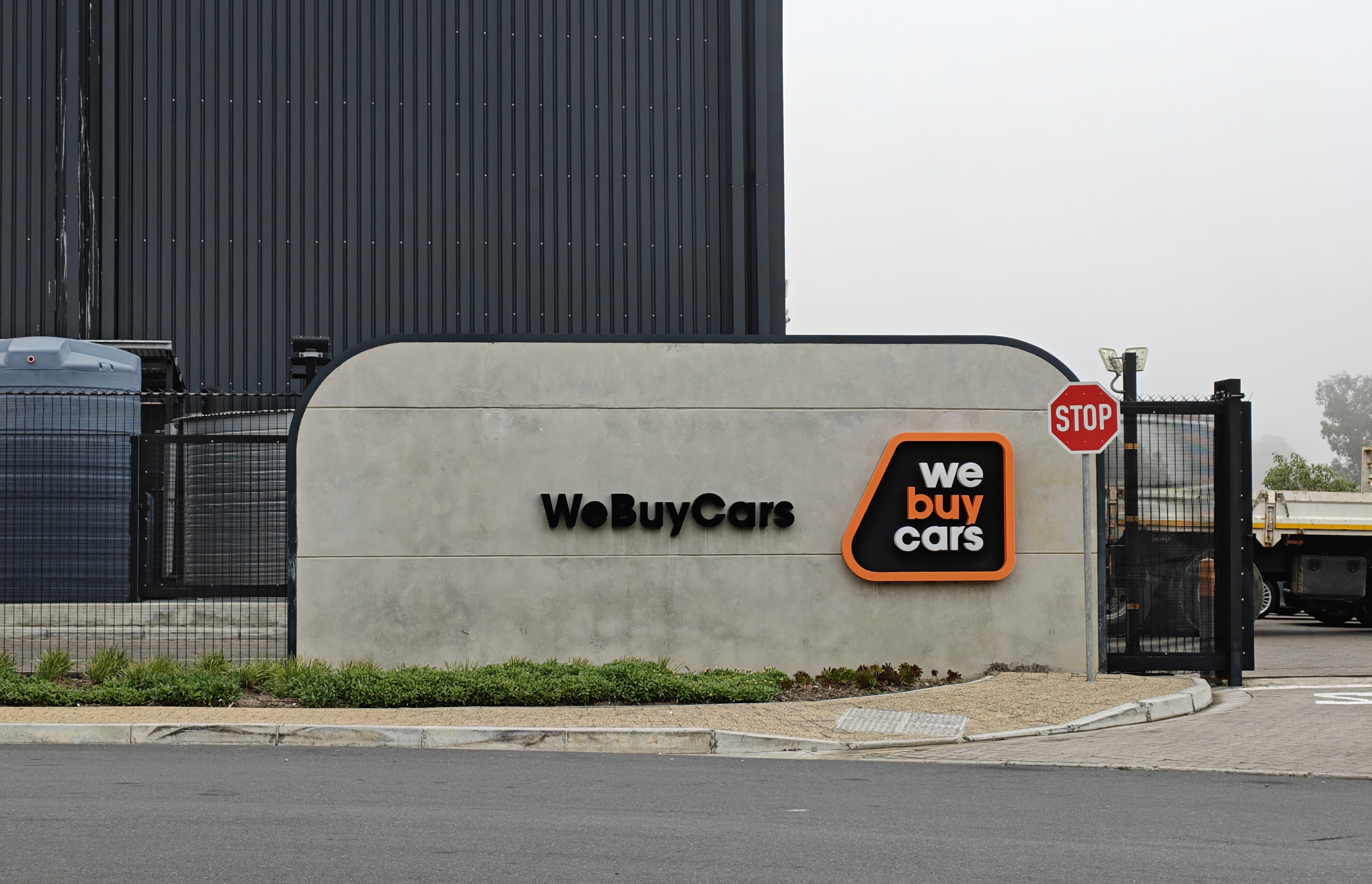
WeBuyCars signage outside one of their showrooms

WeBuyCars has operations across all 9 of South Africa's provinces. The company sells pre-owned cars, motorbikes, caravans, trailers, and boats. It also facilitates trade-ins, vehicle finance, and vehicle insurance.

The company operates via 3 vehicle sales formats - branches, pods, and customer visits. Larger format branches are more like traditional vehicle showrooms. Pods are smaller format locations, situated in areas like shopping mall car parks. Furthermore, WeBuyCars travels to customers' locations and is able to purchase vehicles on the spot, should the client prefer this method.

WeBuyCars also has a super-showroom, in the form of the WeBuyCars Dome in Johannesburg. The facility can house around 2,000 vehicles, operates 7 days a week, and features an underground test area for boats and jet skis.

The company partners with major South African bank, Capitec, to enable customers to open loans at 9 of its vehicle warehouses.

As of November 2025, the company had a total of 18 branches (what the company calls supermarkets), and 106 pods across South Africa, with most located in the Western Cape and Gauteng.

At the time, 50% of its vehicles were sold to cash purchasers, 25% to vehicle finance purchasers, and 25% to pre-owned dealers who were buying vehicles for their stock.

Also in mid-2025, the company reported that it averaged 15,390 vehicle purchases, and 15,232 vehicle sales per month, an increase of 12.9% and 13.5% respectively, compared to the same metrics the previous year.

== Corporate social responsibility ==
In 2025, WeBuyCars reported that 22.6% of its water usage came from non-municipal sources, and 22.7% of its electricity came from solar generation.

== Controversy ==
In January 2026, WeBuyCars agreed to pay an administrative penalty, and penalties to customers, as part of a settlement agreement with the National Consumer Commission (NCC). This followed an investigation by the NCC in 2025, into complaints by customers over three years, stating that WeBuyCars refused to take responsibility for issues that their cars developed within six months of purchase.

Following the investigation, the NCC found that WeBuyCars’ terms and conditions were in contravention of the Consumer Protection Act (CPA). WeBuyCars paid R3.4 million to the 31 customers who took their cases to the Commission, and agreed to pay a R2.5 million fine.

WeBuyCars, in its defense, stated that the majority of customer dispute resolutions were either resolved amicably, or in WeBuyCars' favor. The company said that of the 172,320 pre-owned cars it sold in 2024, a total of 0.36% of customers approached various institutions for dispute resolution. WeBuyCars brought about a number of changes to its operation in order to strengthen its compliance, and bring its terms and conditions in line with the CPA. The company also said it works closely with the Motor Industry Ombud of South Africa, and committed to safeguarding the interests of its customers, and remaining compliant.

== See also ==
- Automotive industry in South Africa
