= Pick n Pay =

Retailer in South Africa

Pick n Pay Group Ltd

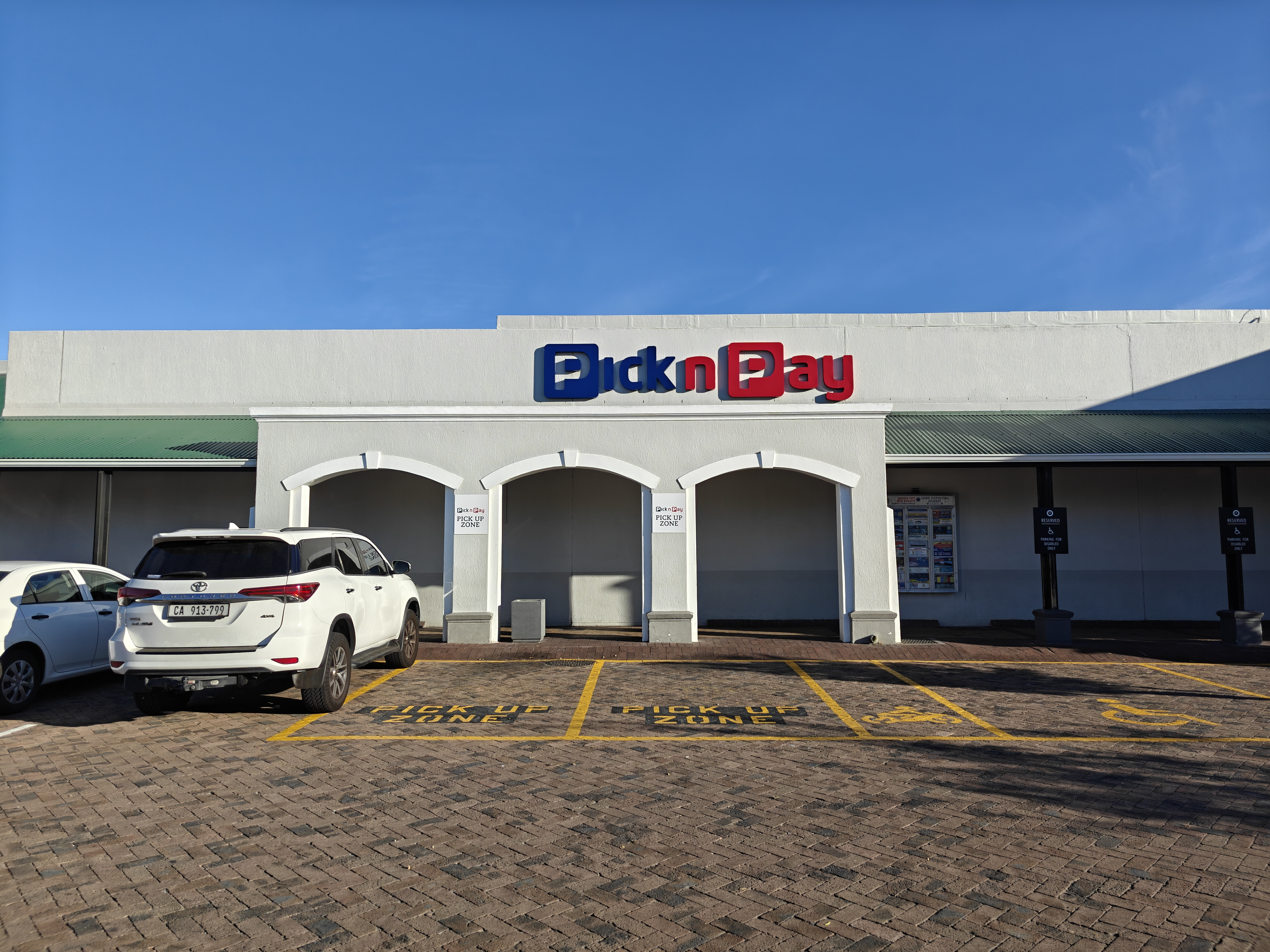
- A Pick n Pay store in Cape Town (its flagship and largest supermarket in the Western Cape), showing the retailer's signage, and Click and Collect parking bays
- Type: Public
- Traded as: JSE: PIK
- ISIN: ZAE000005443
- Industry: Retail; FMCG
- Founded: 1967; 59 years ago
- Founder: Raymond Ackerman
- Headquarters: Kenilworth, Cape Town, South Africa
- Number of locations: 2,269 (1,498 company-owned and 697 franchised) (2025)
- Area served: 7 countries in Africa
- Key people: Gareth Ackerman (Non-executive Chairman); Sean Summers (CEO); Lerena Olivier (CFO)
- Products: Groceries
- Revenue: ▲ R122.1 billion (2025)
- Operating income: ▲ R1.75 billion (2025)
- Net income: ▲ - R651 million (2025)
- Total assets: ▼ R46.8 billion (2025)
- Total equity: ▲ R10.9 billion (2025)
- Number of employees: 90,000 (61,000 at Pick n Pay and 29,000 at Boxer) (2024)
- Divisions: Pick n Pay; Pick n Pay Clothing; Pick n Pay asap! Boxer; TM Supermarkets (49% shareholding)
- Website: pnp.co.za

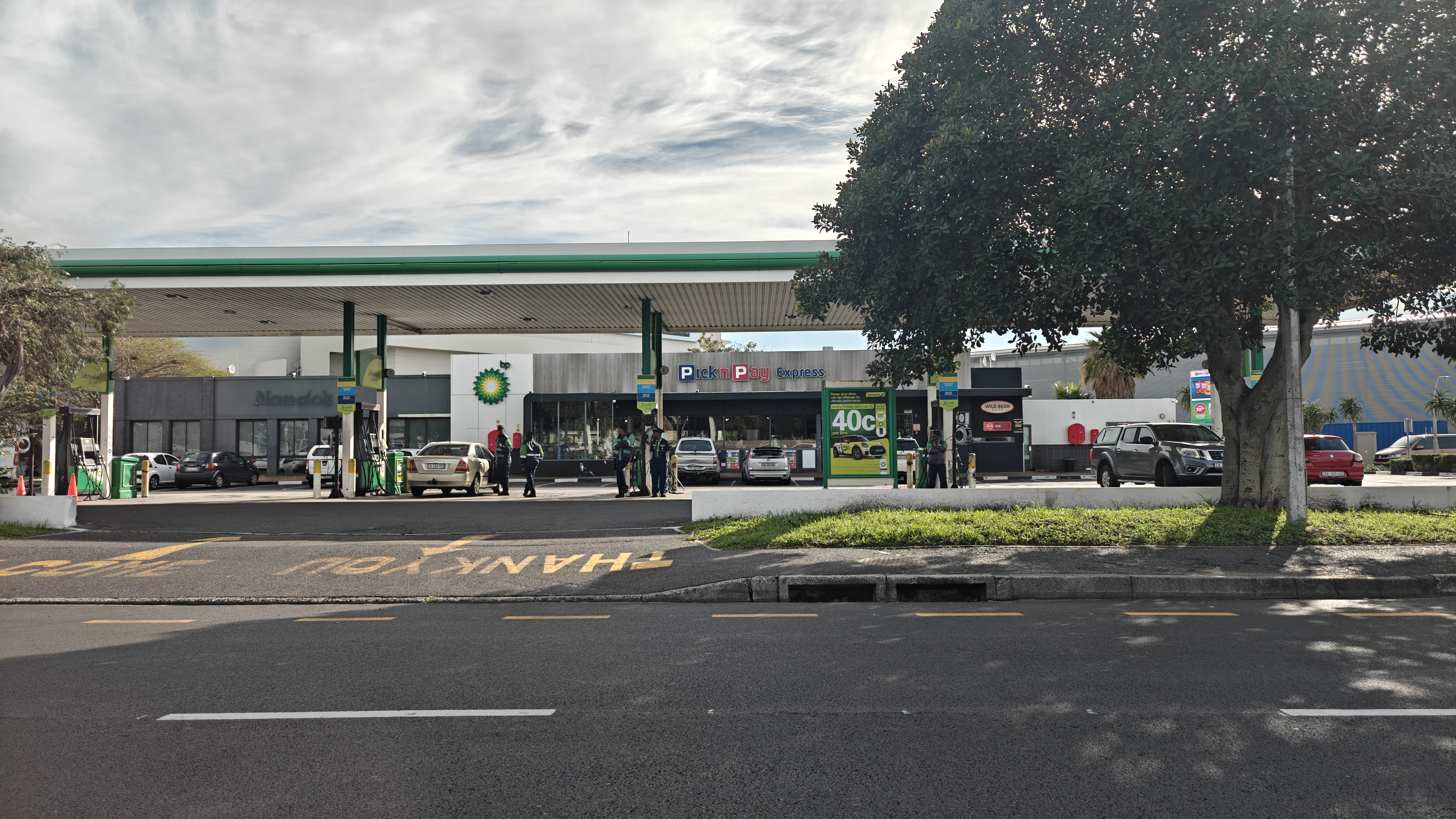
Pick n Pay Express at a BP gas station in Tokai, Cape Town

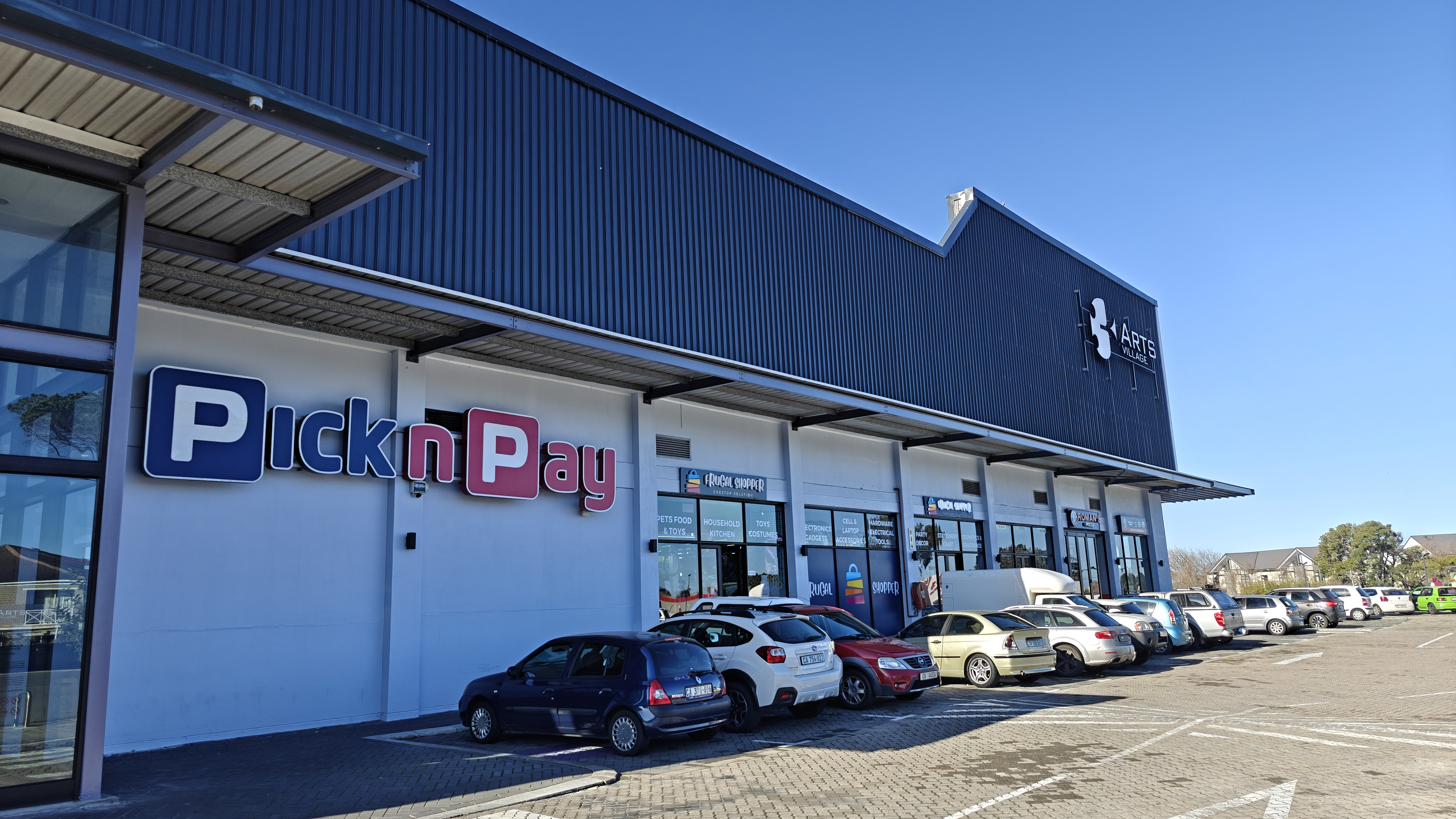
Pick n Pay signage on the side of the 3Arts Village shopping center in Plumstead, Cape Town

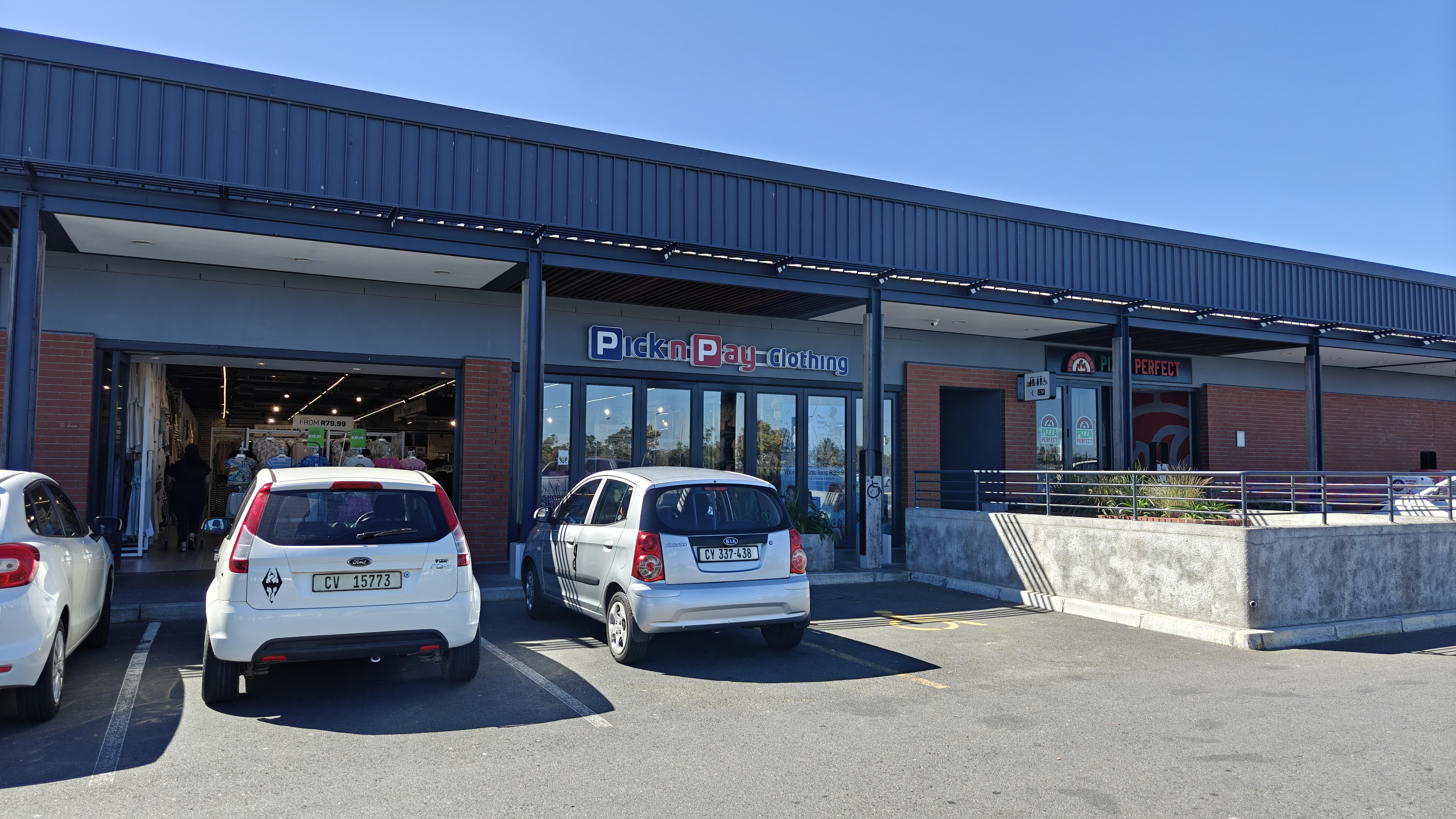
Pick n Pay Clothing store in Montague Gardens, Cape Town

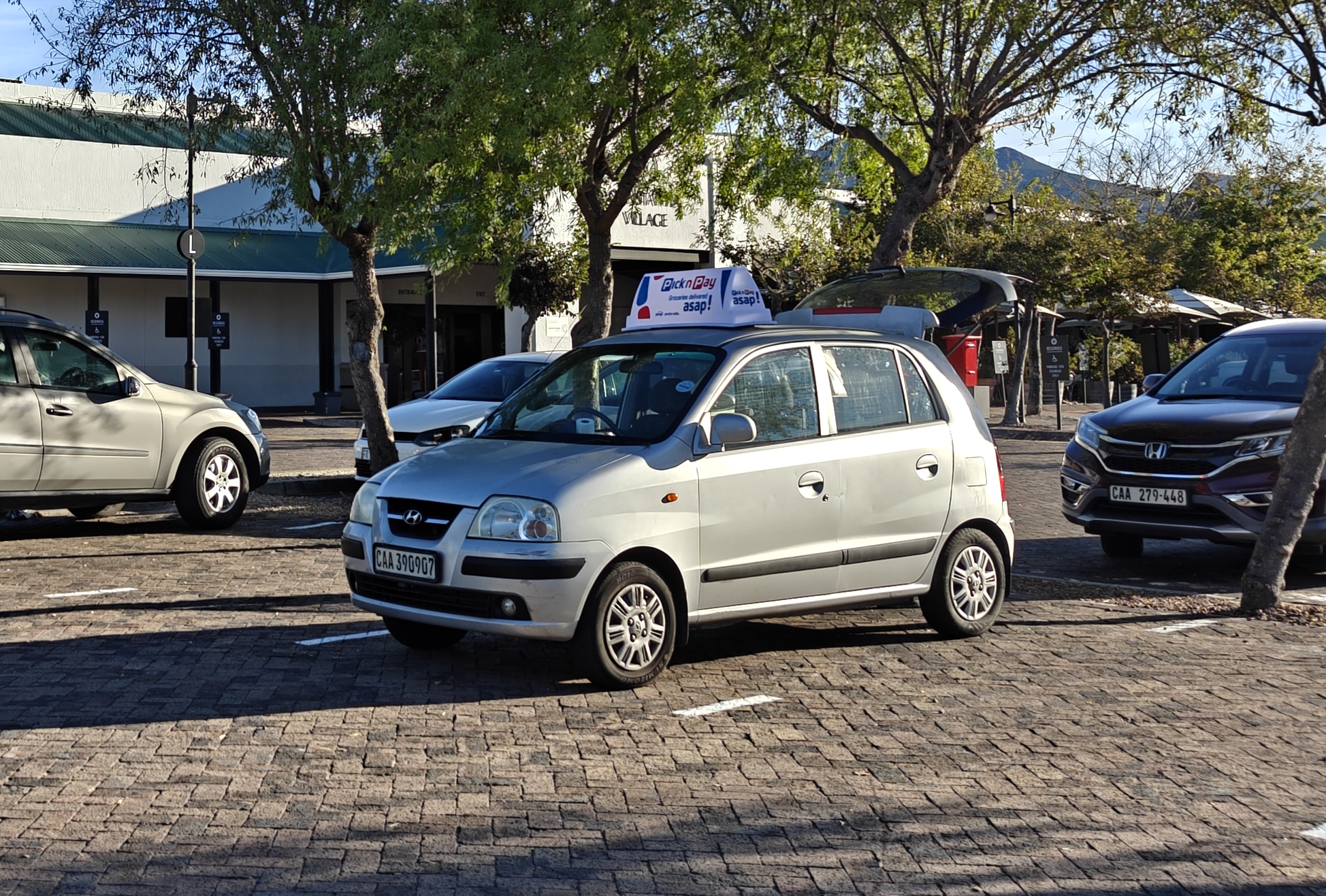
Pick n Pay asap! delivery vehicle in Cape Town

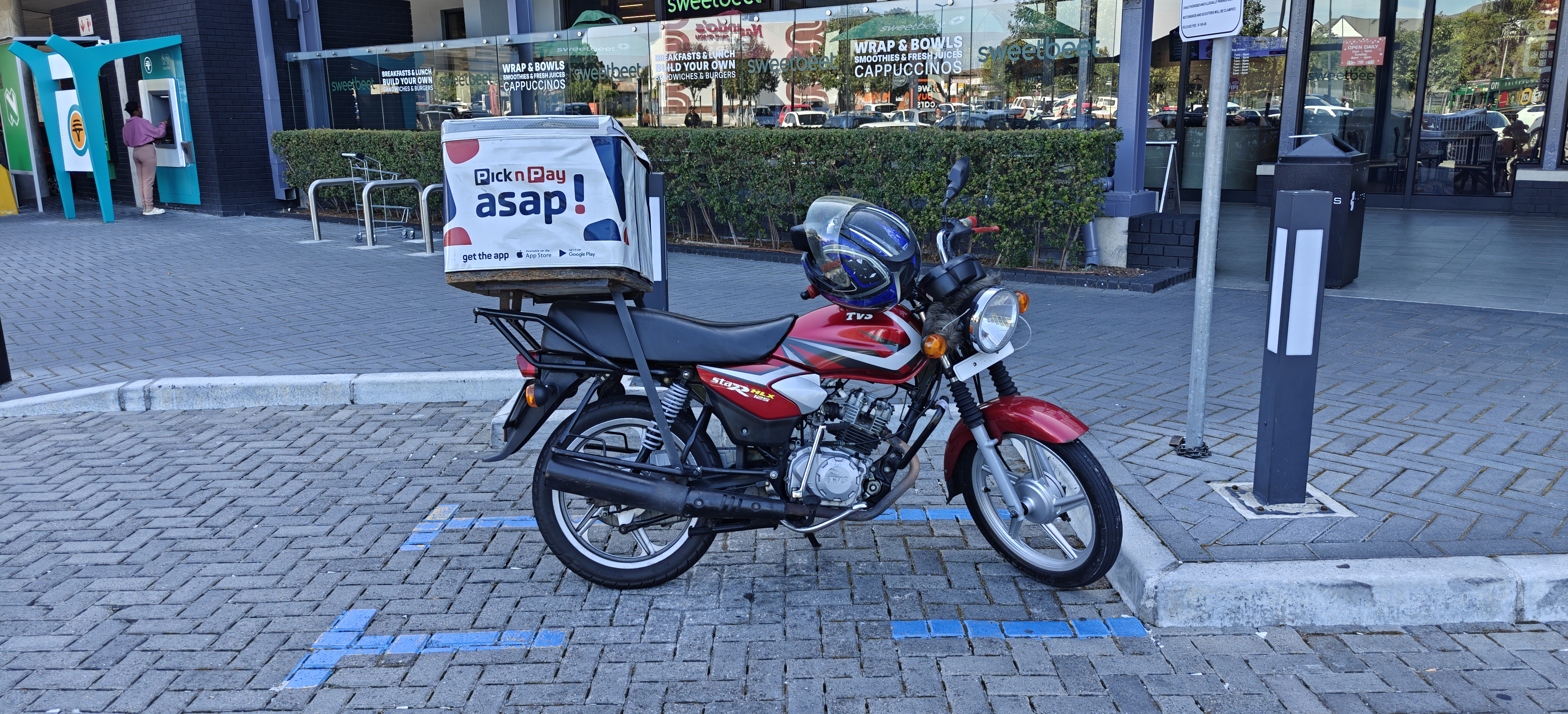
Pick n Pay asap! delivery motorbike at 3Arts Village in Plumstead, Cape Town

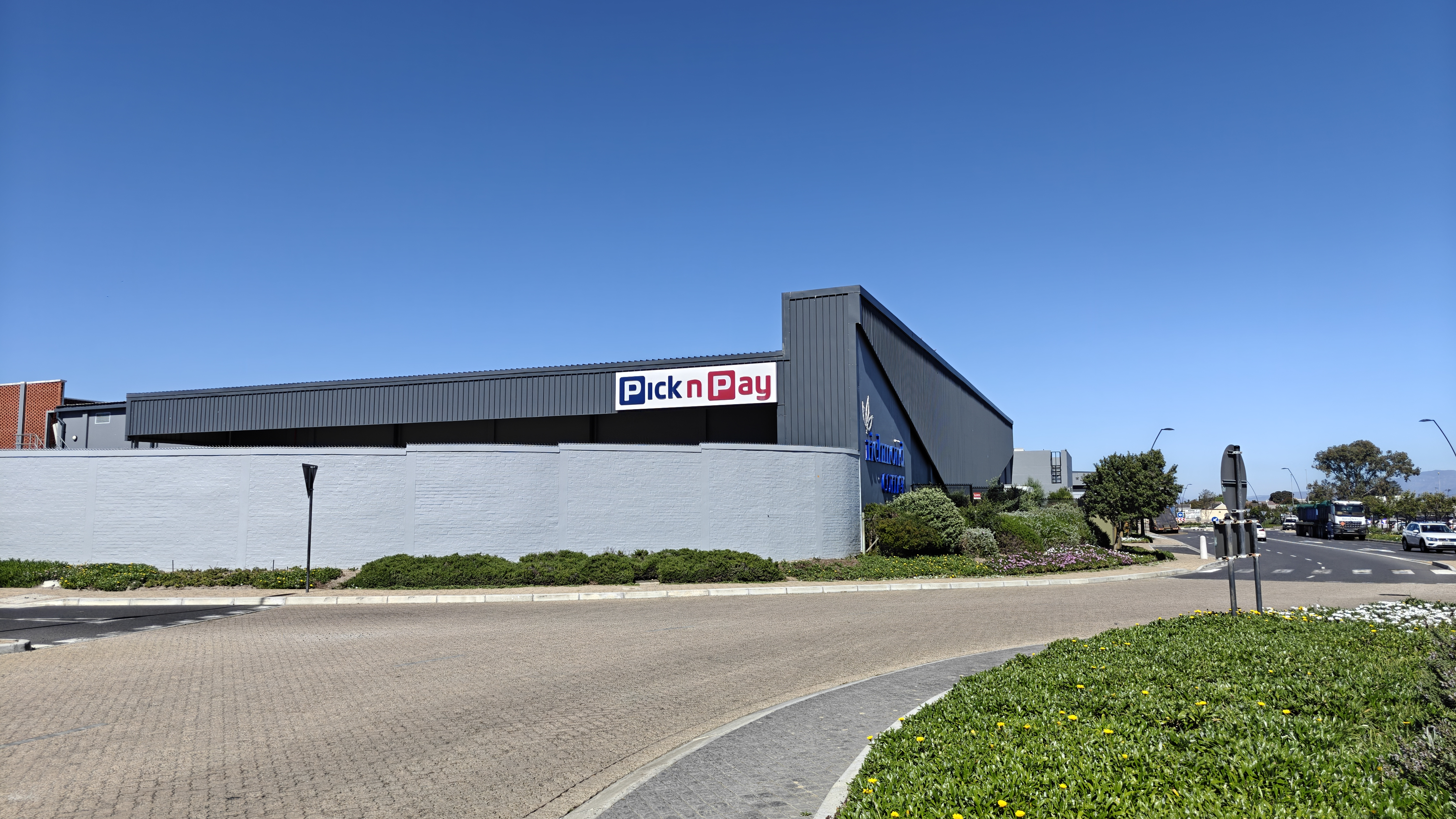
Pick n Pay store in Richwood near Cape Town

Pick n Pay (officially Pick n Pay Group Ltd) is a major South African retail chain, headquartered in Cape Town. Founded in 1967, the company operates around 2,300 stores (both corporate and franchised), and is listed on the JSE Limited.

The group has numerous divisions with their own standalone store formats, including Pick n Pay supermarkets, Pick n Pay Clothing, Liquor Store, Hypermarket, Market, and Express. The group also owns discount retail brand Boxer, which operates supermarkets as well as Liquor, Punch, and Build formats.

As of 2024, Pick n Pay has operations across 7 African countries and employs around 90,000 individuals.

== History ==
Pick n Pay was founded by Raymond Ackerman, son of Gus Ackerman, who founded the Ackermans clothing retail chain in South Africa, in 1916. Raymond joined Ackermans in 1951 as a trainee manager. In the early 1950s, Ackermans was sold to rival department store chain Greatermans.

When Greatermans branched into food retailing, Ackerman recognised the potential for a new type of shopping experience - self-service supermarkets. He encouraged Greatermans to start its own supermarket chain, of which Ackerman would become General Manager. The first store was opened in Mayfair, Johannesburg. The new chain, Checkers, still exists in South Africa, as a major competitor to Pick n Pay.

In 1966, after nine years of running Checkers and taking the number of stores from 4 to 85, Raymond purchased the first four Pick n Pay stores in Cape Town from Jack Goldin.

In 1975, Pick n Pay opened its first Hypermarket - a new retail concept which combined department store and supermarket operations under one roof.

Pick n Pay launched its first franchised store in 1993, in Westville, KwaZulu-Natal. Its first franchised store in the Western Cape was opened in Durbanville in 1994.

In 1997, the company held its first franchise conference, and in 2003, opened its first franchised Pick n Pay Clothing store.

In 2010, Raymond Ackerman resigned as Pick n Pay Chairman. His son, Gareth Ackerman, took over the position.

Pick n Pay acquired a majority stake in the Score supermarket group in 1994.

In 2002 the group acquired Boxer Superstores. All of the Score supermarkets have since been converted into Pick n Pay or Boxer franchises.

In 2024, Pick n Pay reported a 74.4% growth in its omnichannel (digital) sales.

After making a considerable R3.3 billion loss in its 2024 financial year, in March 2025, Pick n Pay reported in its annual financial statements that its turnaround strategy had seen positive results. In the 2025 financial year, the group made a loss of R651 million, improving by over R2.6 billion or just over 80% year-on-year.

On 27 March 2025, Pick n Pay opened a 50,000 square meter store in Westown Square, Shongweni, KwaZulu-Natal, becoming the anchor tenant of the new R15 billion Westown development, situated between Durban and Pietermaritzburg.

The new store indicated a number of changes for the retailer, including catering to high-LSM (high income-earning) consumers with upmarket offerings, and revisions to its standard format, including an expanded fresh produce section, an improved product range, a stronger focus on convenience, improved in-store bakery, a sushi bar, and a sit-down coffee bar (The Roasty).

In May 2025, Pick n Pay announced that former RMB CEO and existing Pick n Pay Lead Independent Director James Formby would step into the role of Chairman when Gareth Ackerman retired, effective from the conclusion of the Annual General Meeting on 5 August 2025.

From 1 July 2025, there were no more Pick n Pay branches located in Namibia.

In October 2025, Pick n Pay's CEO Sean Summers announced that the chain would be commencing with major store refurbishments across South Africa. PnP aims to complete the revamp and reopening of 17 stores by the end of 2025. Among the revamps are a new PnP Hypermarket format, which introduces an expanded general merchandise section and a broader grocery range. Further store revamps will follow in 2026.

In May 2026, it was reported that, as part of its turnaround strategy, Pick n Pay had closed 56 of its stores across South Africa. 39 of those stores were company-owned. At the time, the company was continuing to undertake a multi-year plan aimed at restoring profitability and strengthening operations across the group. Pick n Pay reported improvements in several operational areas.

While the Pick n Pay brand's turnover decreased by 1.6% year-over-year, group turnover increased by 3.4% over the same period. This was driven in large part by Boxer's growth of 12.3% over that period. Although the Pick n Pay segment remained loss-making, the group reduced its headline loss to R363 million, down R45 million from the year before.

In September 2026, Pick n Pay announced that it had appointed Spencer Sonn as its CEO-designate. Sonn previously served as the Managing Director of the Food division at competing retail chain Woolworths, where he worked for 26 years. It was announced that he would join Pick n Pay in February 2027, and take over from CEO Sean Summers once his contract ended in May 2028.

== Operations ==
Pick n Pay's countries of operation as at April 2025.: South Africa (home country); Other countries of operation; No operations

As of 2025, Pick n Pay operated at 2,269 stores (including Boxer stores) across seven countries on the African continent; South Africa (where the majority of its stores are located), Lesotho, Eswatini, Nigeria, Botswana, Zambia, and Zimbabwe. These included:

- 1,125 Pick n Pay, Boxer, and TM Supermarkets (standard size and small stores, with an average size of 2,900 sqm)
- 21 Pick n Pay Hypermarkets (large stores, with an average size of around 13,000 sqm)
- 415 Pick n Pay Clothing stores (clothing-only stores, with an average size of 450 sqm)
- 678 Pick n Pay and Boxer Liquor stores (small format alcohol retail outlets, with an average size of 170 sqm)
- 30 Boxer Build stores

Also in 2025, the company operated 188 forecourt stores, with an average size of 300 sqm, under its Pick n Pay Express banner. These 24-hour stores are situated at BP gas stations, in a partnership aimed at offering customers convenience in high-traffic areas.

2,080 of the company's total stores in 2025 were located in South Africa, while the remaining 189 were situated throughout the remaining six countries of operation.

1,498 stores were corporate-owned and 697 were franchised. The company is a member of the Franchise Association of South Africa. Pick n Pay employs 90,000 individuals, 61,000 of whom work at Pick n Pay stores, and 29,000 of whom work at Boxer stores.

Pick n Pay also owns 49% of TM Supermarkets, a Zimbabwean retail chain. 45 TM Supermarkets stores operate under the Pick n Pay brand.

Pick n Pay supermarkets offer between 8,000 and 18,000 products.

The company uses a localized network of distribution centers, with the main one being the Eastport Distribution Centre.

=== Franchises ===
Pick n Pay allows for franchised supermarkets between 1,500 and 2,200 square meters, and franchised liquor stores between 150 and 250 square meters. Franchisees are provided with e-learning, marketing, advertising, and operational assistance by Pick n Pay corporate.

Some franchises operate under the QualiSave banner, which serves customers in low to middle income communities. In 2003, Pick n Pay franchises provided employment to over 23,000 individuals.

=== Online shopping ===
The group's omnichannel strategy offers customers groceries via a number of digital channels.

Pick n Pay Online caters for larger orders, and facilitates Click and Collect, and home delivery options. Pick n Pay asap! offers select items with a 1-hour delivery window. Pick n Pay on Mr D offers customers access to groceries through the Mr D platform (a major South African takeout app that competes directly with Uber Eats).

=== Loyalty programs ===
Pick n Pay operates a free-to-join loyalty program called Smart Shopper, which was launched in 2011. Customers are able to get a card from a Pick n Pay store, onto which cash back is loaded if they swipe at checkout, or enter the number on their online shopping profiles. This cash can be used when making future purchases. The program had 1.4 million members, as of March 2025.

The retailer also offers consumers the ability to join Pick n Pay Clubs, whereby they can earn extra Smart Shopper points, and receive additional discounts. These include the Coffee, Pets, Wine, Baby, and Live Well Clubs.

In 2018, Smart Shopper partnered with South African gas station chain BP to provide customers with extra points when they purchase gas. TymeBank customers who do so earn extra points. Other Smart Shopper partner businesses include NetFlorist, Europcar, Planet Fitness, Intercape, and Spur.

In November 2024, Pick n Pay partnered with major South African bank, FNB, to enable FNB customers to earn eBucks (FNB's loyalty points) at Pick n Pay stores. As part of this roll-out, FNB began installing banking kiosks in Pick n Pay stores across South Africa, aiming to reach 100 kiosks by June 2026.

The FNB partnership allowed Pick n Pay to tap into the existing 6.4 million-strong eBucks membership group.

== Corporate social responsibility ==
In 1997, with the celebration of 30 years since the foundation of Pick n Pay, the company started the Pick n Pay Foundation, with R30 million set aside to create a fund for philanthropic purposes.

Pick n Pay supports 3,280 schools through its Pick n Pay School Club initiative. The company is also a founding member of the Consumer Goods Council Voluntary Food Waste Agreement, and has a Net Zero 2050 target.

In 2018, Pick n Pay, in partnership with reverse vending machine (RVM) provider Imagined Earth, rolled out machines in its stores wherein customers could place recyclables. These items were then sorted off-site, and sent to the correct recycling centers. The machines, which accept any kind of plastic, glass, and tin product, use AI to analyze items that consumers drop off. Recyclable products are identified by barcode and shape, and reward users via the Imagined Earth mobile app, in which they can earn Pick n Pay Smart Shopper loyalty points by linking their cards.

In November 2024, the recycling initiative was expanded, in partnership with Coca-Cola Beverages South Africa, and it was reported that the project had already facilitated the recycling of 480,000 items, and paid over R40,000 to customers as rewards.

In 2020, as part of its initiative to reduce unnecessary waste, Pick n Pay began offering digital receipts to its Smart Shopper customers (those with a free loyalty card). Customers can have receipts emailed to them, instead of taking a physical receipt in the store. Receipts can also be accessed in the Pick n Pay mobile app for 90 days after purchases are made.

The company spent over R29 million in 2024 Corporate Social Investment and Socio-economic Development expenses, donated 901 tonnes of food to FoodForward SA, and distributed around R13 million worth of goods on behalf of Feed The Nation.

99% of Pick n Pay and Boxer stores' employees, and 80% of their management employees, are deemed to be Historically Disadvantaged South Africans. 64% of the company's employees are women.

The company invests money into sustainable seafood practices, and spent over R53 billion in 2024 on Broad-Based Black Economic Empowerment (BBBEE) businesses.

Pick n Pay Liquor partnered with Ocean Plastic Technologies in 2025, to create wine box holder stands for 100 of its stores, using 4,420 kg of reclaimed and juice packaging. The stands hold free, empty wine boxes, for customers to transport up to 6 bottles of wine, instead of using plastic bags.

Also in 2025, Pick n Pay partnered with the Southern African Foundation for the Conservation of Coastal Birds (Sanccob) on a campaign that educates, and raises awareness and funds, for the protection of African penguins.

== Wine & Food Festival ==
In late April 2025, Pick n Pay again hosted its Pick n Pay Wine & Food Festival in Cape Town. Taking place at the Claremont Cricket Club in 2025, it is an annual celebration of the Cape's food and wines. In 2025, over 50 of South Africa's top wine estates showcased their wines at the festival, during which Pick n Pay hosted tasting room sessions. The Pick n Pay Wine Shop ensured that it stocked the festival's featured wines.

The festival is also host to The Pick n Pay Fresh Food Market for food, Pick n Pay Burger & Pizza Trucks, and Pick n Pay Picnic Bags. The company will host a similar festival in Durban, in June 2025, and another in Johannesburg in October 2025.

== Sponsorships ==
In March 2025, Pick n Pay signed a 4-year contract as a Tier 1 sponsor of SA Rugby, with its logo being placed on the rear of the national team's jerseys. The company also acquired the naming rights to the national club championship - the Gold Cup - and a new women's rugby competition, the details of which are to be announced later in 2025.

One of Pick n Pay's major corporate loyalty partners, FNB, is SA Rugby's front-of-jersey sponsor, however the SA Rugby deals were separate to those between Pick n Pay and FNB, and the co-sponsorship is merely coincidental. The two companies are investing a combined R220 million in SA Rugby.

== See also ==
- Retailing in South Africa
