= NBA Africa Game 2017 =

Team World	Team Africa
108	97
	1	2	3	4	Total
Team World	33	17	27	31	108
Team Africa	19	28	30	20	97
- Date: 5 August 2017
- Venue: Ticketpro Dome, Johannesburg, South Africa
- MVP: Victor Oladipo, Team Africa
- Referees: James Capers; Zach Zarba
- Attendance: 7,348

The 2017 NBA Africa Game was an exhibition basketball game played on 5 August 2017, in the Ticketpro Dome in Johannesburg, South Africa. It was the second NBA game to take place on the continent of Africa and the first since the NBA Africa Game 2015. The teams involved were Team Africa, featuring NBA players and alumni that were born in or had parents born in Africa, and Team World, featuring NBA players from the rest of the world.

== Rosters ==
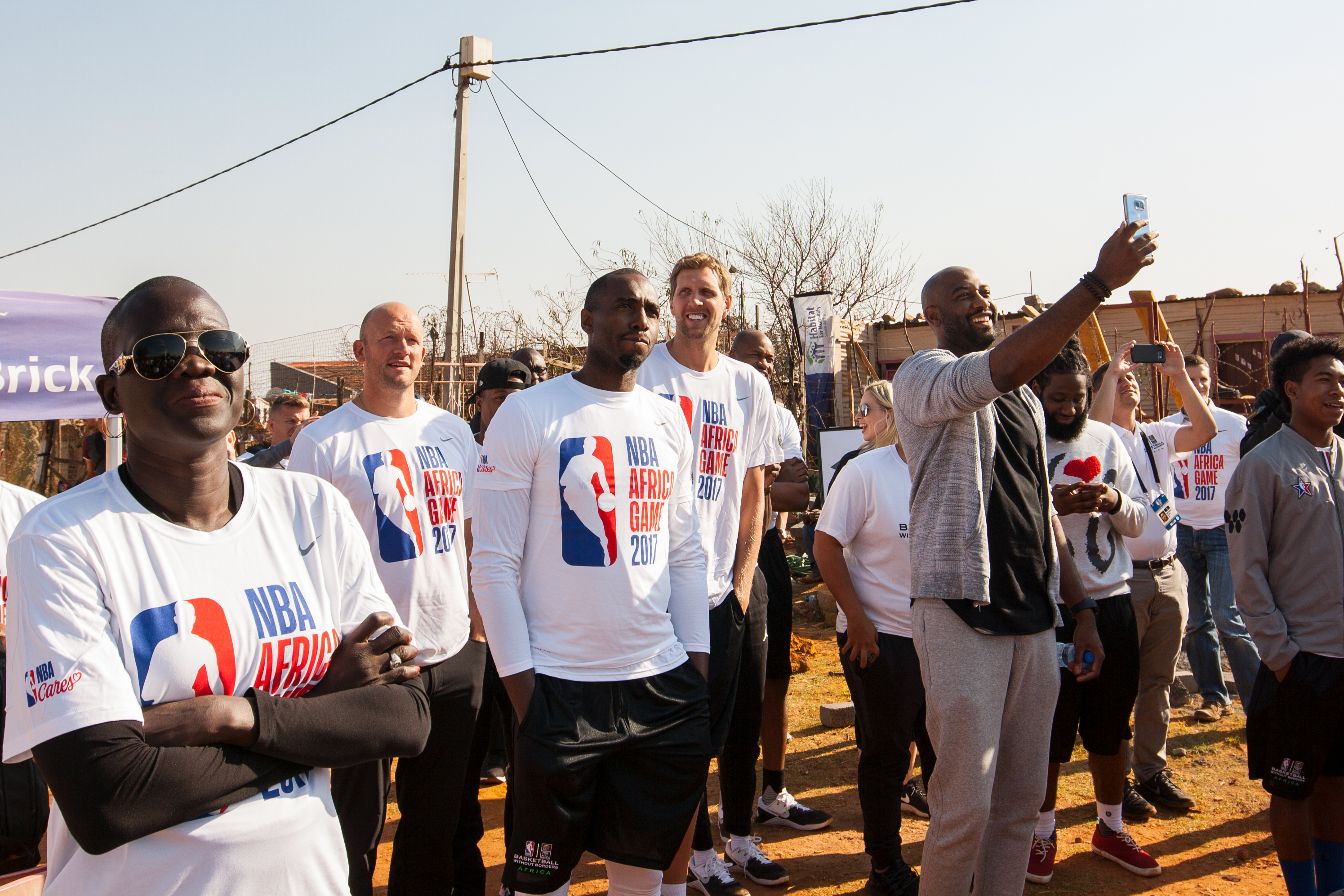
NBA Africa outreach program with Habitat for Humanity

Team Africa
Pos.	Origin	Player	Team
C	DR Congo	Bismack Biyombo	Orlando Magic
C	Angola / Congo (Note: Capela was born in Switzerland, but his parents are from Angola and Congo.)	Clint Capela	Houston Rockets
F	South Sudan (Note: Deng holds British nationality, but he was born in what is now South Sudan.)	Luol Deng^{CAP}	Los Angeles Lakers
F/C	Senegal	Gorgui Dieng	Minnesota Timberwolves
C	Cameroon	Joel Embiid^{INJ}	Philadelphia 76ers
F/C	Congo (Note: Ibaka represents Spain in international competition, but he was born in the Republic of the Congo.)	Serge Ibaka	Toronto Raptors
F	Cameroon	Luc Mbah a Moute	Houston Rockets
C	Tunisia	Salah Mejri	Dallas Mavericks
G	DR Congo	Emmanuel Mudiay	Denver Nuggets
G	Nigeria / Sierra Leone (Note: Oladipo was born in the United States, but his father was born in Sierra Leone and his mother in Nigeria.)	Victor Oladipo	Indiana Pacers
G/F	South Africa (Note: Sefolosha was born in Switzerland, but his father was born in South Africa.)	Thabo Sefolosha^{CAP}	Utah Jazz
G	The Gambia (Note: Schröder was born in Germany, but his mother was born in The Gambia.)	Dennis Schröder	Atlanta Hawks
Head coach:

Team World
Pos.	Nat.	Player	Team
G	Brazil	Leandro Barbosa	Free agent
G/F	U.S.	Jaylen Brown	Boston Celtics
F	U.S.	Wilson Chandler	Denver Nuggets
F/C	U.S.	DeMarcus Cousins	New Orleans Pelicans
C	U.S.	Andre Drummond	Detroit Pistons
F	U.S.	Rondae Hollis-Jefferson	Brooklyn Nets
G	U.S.	Courtney Lee	New York Knicks
G	U.S.	Kyle Lowry	Toronto Raptors
G	U.S.	CJ McCollum	Portland Trail Blazers
F	Germany	Dirk Nowitzki^{CAP}	Dallas Mavericks
F/C	Latvia	Kristaps Porziņģis	New York Knicks
G	U.S.	Kemba Walker^{CAP}	Charlotte Hornets
Head coach:

- CAP Deng and Sefolosha were the captains for Team Africa.
- CAP Nowitzki and Walker were the captains for Team World.
- INJ Embiid did not play because of injury.
