= 3Arts Village =

Shopping center in Cape Town

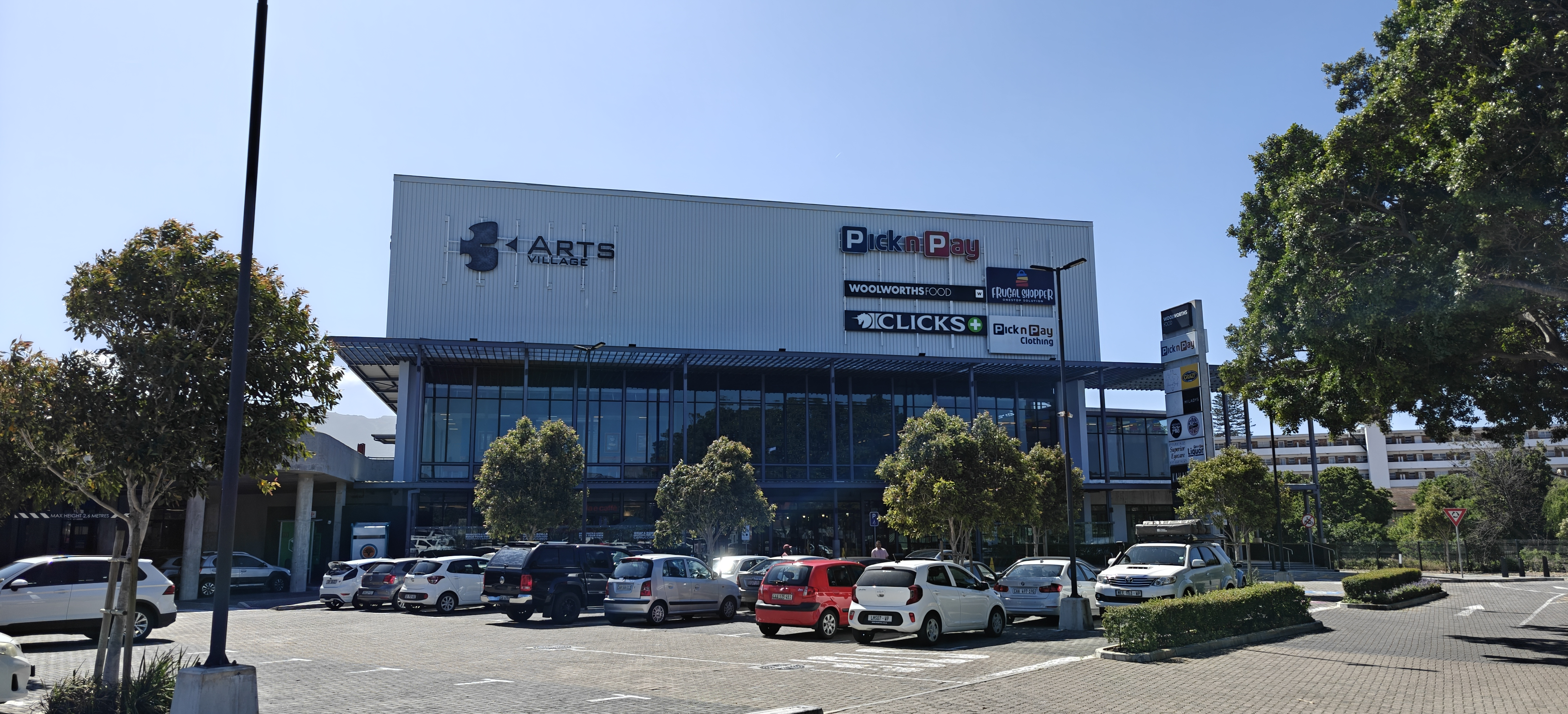
- Interactive map of the 3Arts Village area

General information
- Type: Shopping center
- Architectural style: Contemporary
- Location: M4, Plumstead, Cape Town, South Africa
- Coordinates: 34.0271901°S 18.4631257°E
- Current tenants: Woolworths and Pick n Pay, among others
- Opening: 1967; 59 years ago
- Renovated: October 2021; 4 years ago
- Owner: Rapfund Investments (100%)

Height
- Height: 2 stories
- Roof: Flat

Technical details
- Floor count: 2
- Floor area: 7,400 m^{2} (80,000 sq ft)

Design and construction
- Main contractor: Consani’s Eng. Ltd; Robert Katz Construction Company (Pty) Ltd

Renovating team
- Architect: KMH
- Renovating firm: SVRSA
- Structural engineer: Sutherland
- Civil engineer: Sutherland
- Other designers: cndv landscape architecture
- Quantity surveyor: SVRSA

Other information
- Number of stores: ~ 30

Website
- 3artsvillage.co.za

3Arts Village is a shopping center located along the M4 in Plumstead, Cape Town, South Africa.

Originally built as a theater in 1967, the building is a Plumstead landmark, and has had many uses over its lifetime. The building was redeveloped into a retail space in 2019, to serve the local residential community.

The center features over 30 stores, including a variety of restaurants, and both covered and uncovered parking bays.

== History ==
=== 3 Arts Theater ===
Logo of the 3 Arts Theater

3Arts Village was originally the 3 Arts Theater, and was built in 1967, by Ronnie Quibell and his brother, who designed the space with a functionalist approach.

3Arts Village was constructed during a period when the South African construction industry was overloaded, and the South African Department of Community Development had imposed a ban on non-essential building in order to overcome a housing shortage.

The land owners were told that the building of the theater could only proceed if built by unconventional means that would conserve bricks, bricklayers, plasterers, and carpenters. As such, it was decided that construction would be in the form of large concrete elements.

The theater was known for its non-racial status during the apartheid era in South Africa. All races were permitted to attend shows, according to its then-owner. Thus, people of all demographics gathered together to enjoy performances at the theater, in what would foreshadow post-apartheid entertainment in the country.

The upmarket theater attracted guests including Tina Turner, Tom Jones, Curtis Mayfield, Eartha Kitt, The Temptations, Vicky Leandros, and Josephine Baker.

=== Various Other Uses ===
After the theater closed in 2002, the building was used for various functions, including as a garden center, an ice-skating rink, and for a farmer's market. It was also left empty for some time.

=== Shopping Center ===
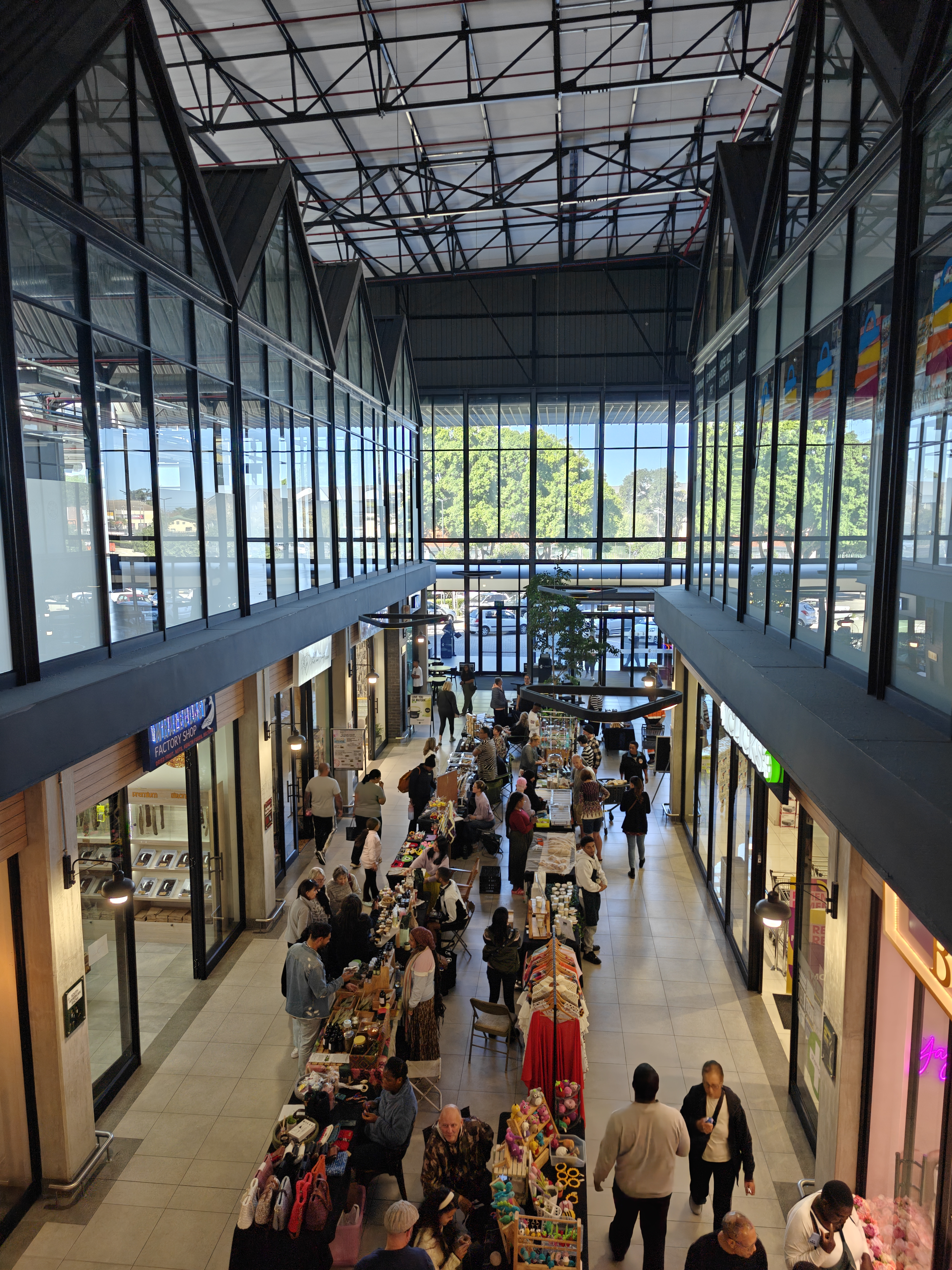
The interior of 3Arts Village, showing the building's height and some of its original architecture

The building was bought by Rapfund Investments in 2019, and converted into a shopping center. The intention was to retain its original character, and much of the original structure was retained.

Construction began with demolition of parts of the existing building in August 2020, and was completed in October 2021. The center opened to the public on 2 November 2021.

== Features ==
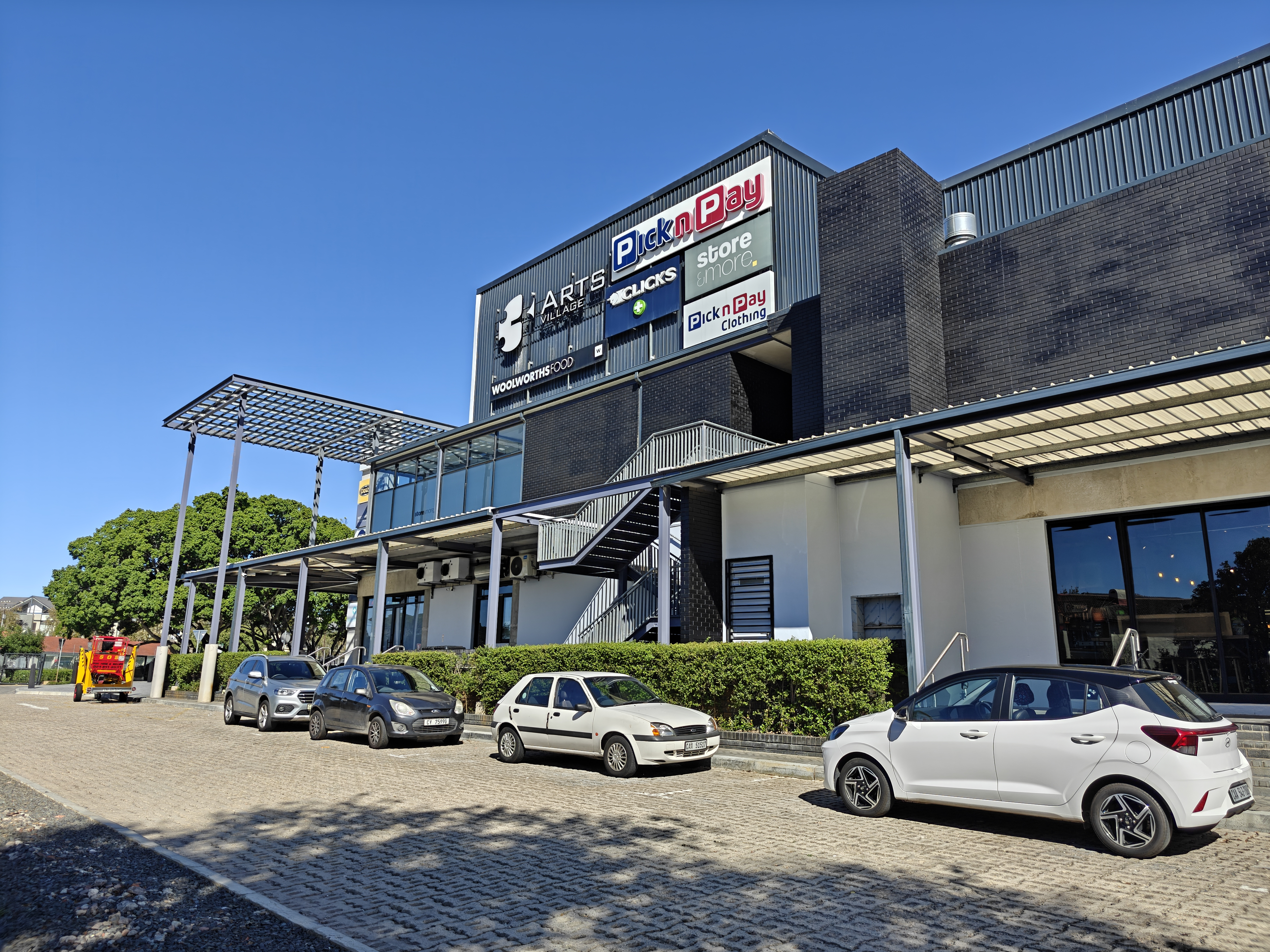
The side of 3Arts Village, showing signage for its anchor tenants

3Arts Village is a small shopping center, in contrast to the larger ones nearby (like Constantia Village), and the numerous full shopping malls that the Southern Suburbs is home to (such as Blue Route Mall and Cavendish Square).

The center is home to over 30 stores, covering around 7,400 square meters.

Categories of retail and services offered at 3Arts Village include groceries, restaurants, personal care, books, and homeware.

Anchor tenants include Woolworths Food, Pick n Pay and Clicks. The center is also home to a WeBuyCars pre-owned vehicle sales pod, which is situated in 3Arts' car park.

== Heritage ==
In 2022, the shopping center's owners commissioned a visual display to tell the story of 3Arts through the ages. A main display was erected, along with smaller wall-mounted images of old souvenir programs from the time when 3Arts was theatre, which were installed all around the shopping center for visitors to enjoy.

The project ended up being a community initiative. Rapfund Investments went to the Western Cape Archives, the National Library, used materials provided by the Quibell family, and invited the public to contribute towards the project.

== Sustainability ==
3Arts Village installed a 375 kWP solar system on the roof of the building to reduce reliance on the conventional electrical grid, and has a backup generator to power the shopping center during any power outages. It also has a borehole system, with water storage tanks, for water-wise irrigation.

The riverbank alongside the building is also being rehabilitated, and once complete, will be opened to the public.
