= WeBuyCars Dome =

Indoor car showroom in South Africa

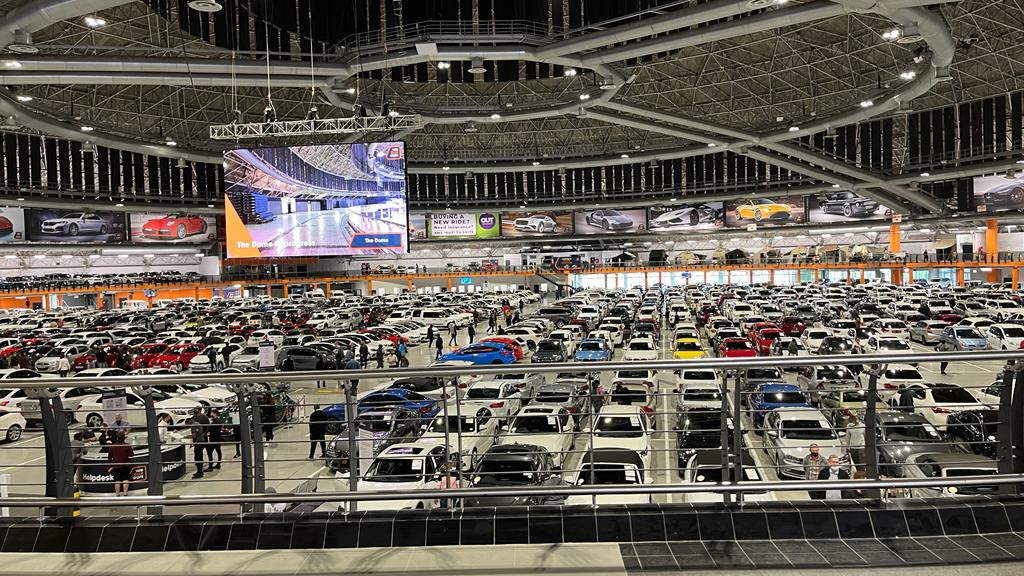
- The WeBuyCars Dome in 2022
- Interactive map of WeBuyCars Dome
- Former names: MTN Sundome (1998–2001); The Dome at Northgate (2001–2004); Coca-Cola Dome (2004–2015); TicketPro Dome (2015–2021)
- Address: Northumberland Rd and Olievenhout Ave; Northriding; Randburg; 2161 South Africa
- Location: Northgate Shopping Centre
- Coordinates: 26°03′47.55″S 27°56′35.52″E
- Owner: WeBuyCars
- Capacity: 20,000 seats (arena) +1,000 vehicles (showroom)

Construction
- Opened: 8 April 1998 (arena)
- Closed: 7 September 2021 (arena)
- Architects: Bentel Abramson & Partners
- Project manager: BMR Partnership
- Structural engineer: Lillicrap Crutchfield
- Services engineers: Rawlins Wales & Partners; Richard Pearce and Partner
- Main contractor: Wilson Bayly Holmes Ovcon

Website
- Venue Website

The WeBuyCars Dome, previously known as the TicketPro Dome, Coca-Cola Dome, The Dome at Northgate, and MTN Sundome, is a large car showroom and former indoor arena, located in Randburg, north of Johannesburg, South Africa.

The Dome is owned by major South African non-manufacturing automotive group, WeBuyCars. The building serves as the company's flagship showroom, with around 11,000 square meters of retail space, and a capacity of around 2,000 vehicles. The Dome also has an underground area for the testing of aquatic vehicles.

== History ==
The building opened on 8 April 1998 with a concert by Diana Ross in front of a 15,000 strong audience. Nelson Mandela made a surprise appearance on stage during the official opening.

The arena closed temporarily in September 2021.

In December 2021, South African non-manufacturing automotive group, WeBuyCars, bought the Dome from the Sasol Pension Fund, and turned it into a pre-owned vehicle showroom, with a capacity of around 2,000 vehicles.

== Location ==
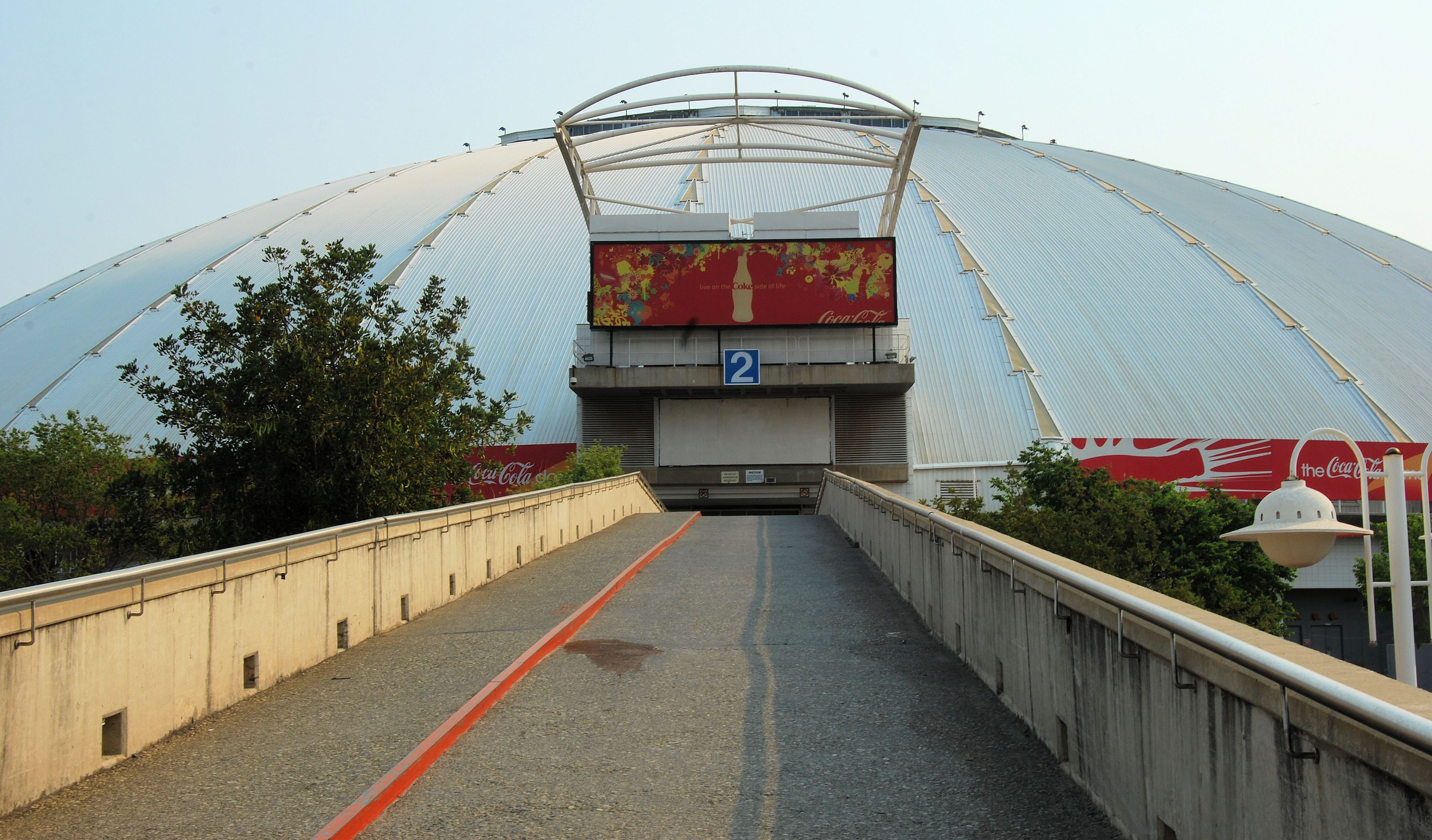
The Dome exterior in October 2008

The WeBuyCars Dome is situated adjacent to Northgate Shopping Centre on the corner of Olievenhout Avenue and Northumberland Road, in the suburb North Riding, a short distance west of the N1/Western Bypass highway.

The venue is 45 km from O. R. Tambo International Airport, 16 km from Lanseria Airport and 20 km from the Sandton business centre.

== Events ==
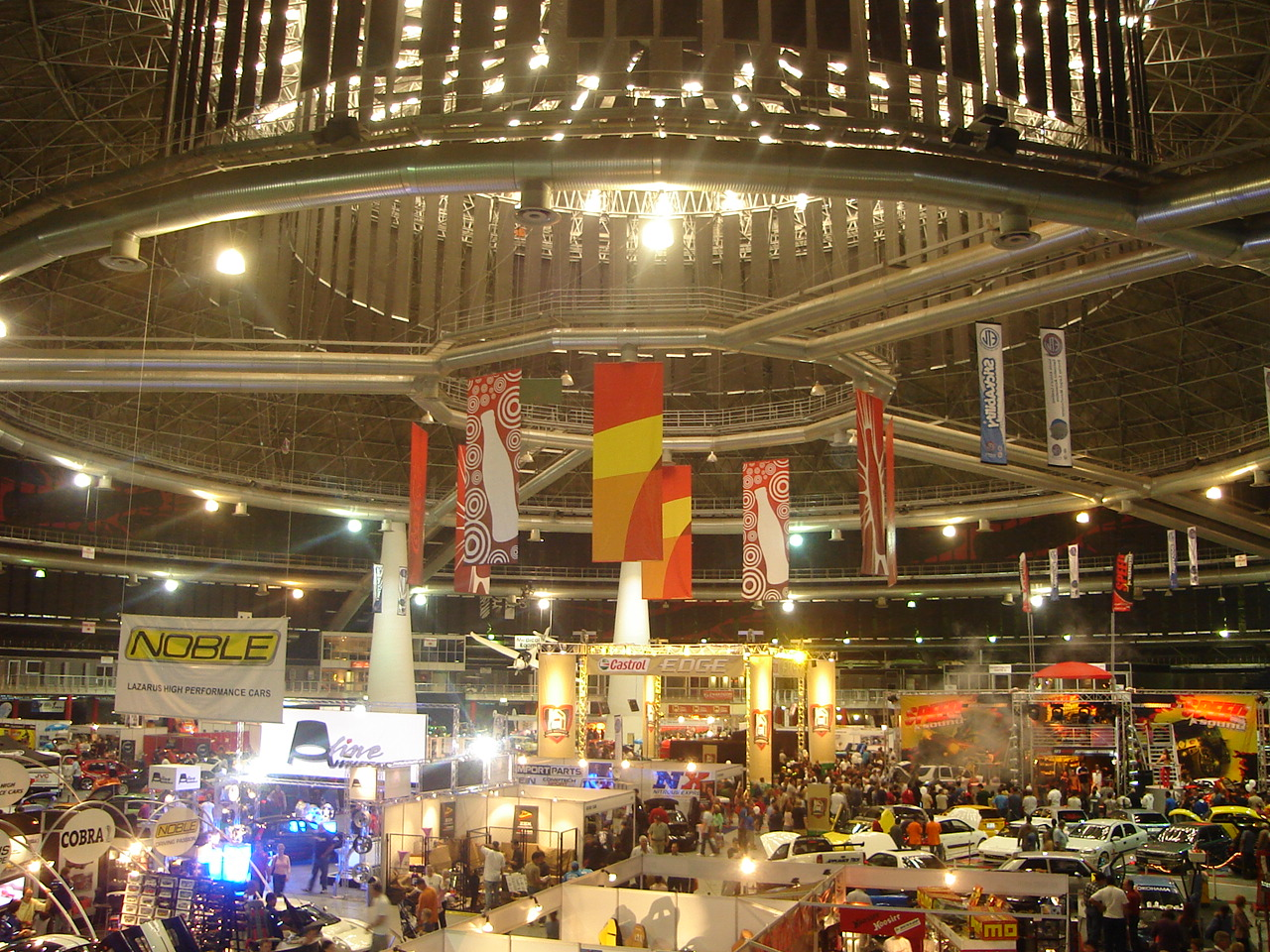
The Dome during the Castrol Xtreme Auto Show event in August 2005.

On 8 May 2005, Avril Lavigne held a concert Bonez Tour in support of her second studio album, Under My Skin.

On 20 May 2001, Irish vocal pop band Westlife held a concert for their Where Dreams Come True Tour supporting their album Coast to Coast.

On 25 October 2015, South African hip hop recording artist Cassper Nyovest announced that tickets to his upcoming show at the venue titled #FillUpTheDome had sold out. He is the first South African hip hop act to accomplish this feat.

On 1 and 2 May 2016, American pop-R&B diva Mariah Carey performed at the Dome for The Sweet Sweet Fantasy Tour.

On 5 August 2017, the NBA Africa Game was held at the Dome.

From 18 to 21 July 2018, American singer-songwriter Katy Perry performed at the Dome as part of her Witness: The Tour.

On 13–14 April 2019, British singer Sam Smith performed at the dome as part of their The Thrill of It All Tour.

== See also ==
- Automotive industry in South Africa
