= Raymond Ackerman (businessman) =

South African businessman (1931–2023)

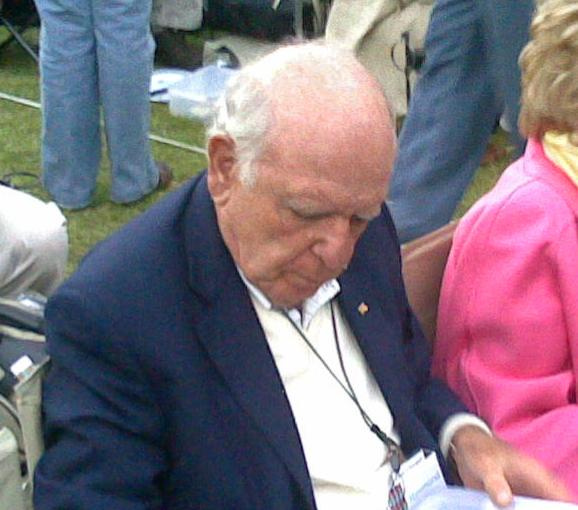
- Ackerman in 2008
- Born: 10 March 1931; Cape Town, South Africa
- Died: 6 September 2023 (aged 92)
- Education: Diocesan College; University of Cape Town, Bcom (Accounting)
- Occupation: Businessman (Owner of Pick 'n Pay)

Raymond Ackerman GCOB (10 March 1931 – 6 September 2023) was a South African businessman, who purchased the Pick 'n Pay supermarket group from its founder. He purchased four stores from Jack Goldin in the 1960s. Raymond Ackerman was chairman until he stepped down in 2010.

== Biography ==
He was born in Cape Town in 1931, the son of the Ackerman's clothing group founder, Gus Ackerman, and was educated at Bishops Diocesan College. After graduating from the University of Cape Town with a Bachelor of Commerce, where he was influenced W.H. Hutt's theory of commercial sovereignty, he joined the Greatermans group in the Ackermans division in 1951 at the age of 20 as a trainee manager. Ackermans had been founded just after World War I by his father Gus, but was sold to the Greatermans group in 1940.

Ackerman was eventually offered a position at Greatermans head office in Johannesburg. In the early 1950s, food retailing supermarkets first began to appear on the scene in South Africa. Norman Herber, chairman of Greatermans decided to start a food retailer called Checkers. Ackerman was eventually put in charge of Checkers, making a resounding success of the business.

Ackerman won the Outstanding Young South African award in 1965, along with Gary Player and by 1966, at the age of 35, he was the managing director of 85 Checkers stores; however, he was fired in the same year. In response, using his severance pay and a bank loan, Ackerman bought four stores in Cape Town trading under the name Pick 'n Pay. Under his leadership, Pick 'n Pay eventually grew into one of Africa's largest supermarket chains, with a thirty seven billion Rand turnover (2006 figure) and more than 124 supermarkets, 14 hypermarkets and 179 franchised outlets. The Pick 'n Pay Group employs more than 30,000 people in several African countries.

In 2004, in partnership with University of Cape Town he established the Raymond Ackerman Academy for Entrepreneurial Development targeted at young people aged 18 to 35.

Ackerman campaigned heavily for consumer rights. He lobbied Anton Rupert for cheaper cigarette prices and with the government over the price of bread. His biggest fight was with the authorities to deregulate gasoline prices, though this was unsuccessful; “We were stopped when we tried to cut petrol prices at our Boksburg Hypermarket 52 years ago as fuel producers and the government always held a tight relationship. We weren’t allowed to cut petrol, or the prices of many other essential items, such as bread. We even tried to offer our customers a discount for fuel if they bought food from us, but this was stopped too. Eventually, the government threatened to arrest me if I sold petrol at a discount.” To keep prices low, the firm imports branded products.

In 2009 he announced his retirement and that his son, Gareth would succeed him as chairman

== Philanthropy ==
The Ackerman family's support for the Red Cross War Memorial Children's Hospital dates to Gus's involvement in funding its establishment in 1956. In 2006, the Ackermans donated R4 million to the hospital. Pick 'n Pay was very involved with Cape Town's bid to bring the 2004 Summer Olympics to South Africa. On 14 February 2005, the Raymond Ackerman Academy of Entrepreneurial Development opened in Cape Town to develop business skills and train future managers and leaders for South Africa.

== Personal life ==
He married his wife Wendy with whom he had four children, Suzanne, Kathryn, Jonathan, and Gareth. He was a member of Temple Israel, a progressive synagogue in Cape Town. His wife and children are also involved in Pick n Pay, working for the retailer or its charity.

=== Death ===
Raymond Ackerman died on 6 September 2023, at the age of 92. His death was announced that same day by the managing director of the Katale Partnership, Nicky Bicket. His synagogue released a statement; “Temple Israel mourns the passing of our beloved member and patron. His and Wendy’s mark is found all over South Africa in the staff trained, organisations started, charities supported, and businesses incubated. No less in the Jewish community, where their concerns have always been around education, inspiration, and inclusivity.”

In September 2023, Pick n Pay staff across South Africa attended a memorial service for Ackerman. Stores opened later than usual to allow employees to participate. The service featured performances by the Herzlia School choir and readings of Jewish prayers by a chaplain. At the time of Ackerman's death, more than 50 years after he founded Pick n Pay, the company had expanded to more than 2,000 stores across South Africa.

== Awards and honours ==
Ackerman received an honorary doctorate in law from Rhodes University in 1986. His alma mater, the University of Cape Town, awarded him an honorary doctorate in commerce in 2001. He was voted 79th in the Top 100 Great South Africans in 2004. In November 2004, the Financial Times named him the only South African among the world's 100 greatest business leaders. In South Africa, he is often ranked with Harry Oppenheimer and Anton Rupert. Ackerman, together with his wife Wendy were awarded the 2010 David Rockefeller Bridging Leadership in Africa Award by The Synergos Institute Southern Africa office.

In 2024, at the South African Jewish Board of Deputies' 120th anniversary gala dinner, he was honoured among 100 remarkable Jewish South Africans who have contributed to South Africa. The ceremony included speeches from Chief Rabbi Ephraim Mirvis, and Ackerman was honoured among other business figures such as Donald Gordon, Sol Kerzner and Barney Barnato.

== Books ==
Raymond Ackerman published three books on his experiences and with advice for young entrepreneurs.

1) Ackerman, Raymond: Hearing Grasshoppers Jump. The story of Raymond Ackerman as told to Denise Prichard. Cape Town: David Philip, 2004. 2) Ackerman, Raymond: The Four Legs of the Table. Raymond Ackerman's simple, straight-forward formula for success as told to Denise Prichard. Cape Town: David Philip, 2005. 3) Ackerman, Raymond: A Sprat to Catch a Mackerel. Key Principles to build your business. Cape Town: Jonathan Ball, 2010.

== Bibliography ==
- Gerber, Amelda: "Entrepreneurs kry nuwe leerskool. Raymond Ackerman verskaf geld om sentrum by sakeskool te vestig." Die Burger, 15 February 2005.
- Die Burger, 9 March 2006.
- La Vita, Murray: "Mister A. moet nou groet." Die Burger, 12 March 2010.
