= Plumstead, Cape Town =

Suburb of Cape Town, South Africa

Plumstead
- Interactive map of Plumstead
- Coordinates: 34°1′20″S 18°28′20″E
- Country: South Africa
- Province: Western Cape
- Municipality: City of Cape Town
- Main Place: Cape Town

Area
  - Total: 4.58 km^{2} (1.77 sq mi)

Population (2011)
  - Total: 20,178
  - Density: 4,410/km^{2} (11,400/sq mi)

Racial makeup (2011)
  - Black African: 10.4%
  - Coloured: 28.8%
  - Indian/Asian: 2.5%
  - White: 54.5%
  - Other: 3.8%

First languages (2011)
  - English: 83.2%
  - Afrikaans: 10.4%
  - Xhosa: 1.3%
  - Other: 5.1%
- Time zone: UTC+2 (SAST)
- Postal code (street): 7800
- PO box: 7801
- Area code: 021

Plumstead is a residential suburb situated in the Southern Suburbs region of Cape Town, in the Western Cape province of South Africa.

== History ==
Plumstead was first mentioned when, in 1762, a large portion of the land beyond the Constantia Valley was granted to the free burghers Hendrick Jergens and Johan Barrens, who were Dutch settlers. They called the land Rust en Werk (Dutch for Rest and Work).

Twenty years later the land was granted to Hendrick Bouman Brigeraad. After the decline of the Dutch East India Company, the British occupied the Cape.

Henry Batt arrived in 1807 from the United Kingdom, bought Rust and Werk, and renamed it Plumstead, after a district of London with the same name. He farmed the area for twenty-six years and died in 1833. The farm Plumstead was sub-divided and bought by Messrs. Higgs, Loubscher and Southey. Today, Plumstead consists of a mix of houses built in the 1940s and 1950s and more modern residences.

The abolition of slavery in 1833 saw the emergence of a strong Muslim community in the area, resulting Plumstead becoming a focal point for the Muslim community in the southern Peninsula region.

== Geography ==
The suburb is bordered to the east by the M5 freeway, and to the west by the suburb of Constantia. Traveling through Constantia, residents of Plumstead have quick access to Cape Town's other major freeway, the M3.

The neighbourhood is situated approximately 15 km from the CBD, 20 km from the V&A Waterfront, 20 km from Century City, 12 km from the coast (at Muizenberg), 60 km from Stellenbosch, and 70 km from Paarl.

Plumstead is a medium-sized suburb (by area) in the context of Cape Town neighbourhood sizes. The neighbourhood is divided into three parts, bisected north to south by the M4, and east to west (through one half) by Victoria Road. The neighbourhood contains many homes built during the 1940s, 1950s, and 1960s, and comprises mainly detached houses. Some homes have historic status.

There are several recreation areas within the Plumstead Suburb, including Lympleigh Road Park (the largest parkland in the area), Waterford Park, Burnham Road Park, Churchill Road Park, Sovereign Road Park, Wicklow Road Park, Smith Road Park, and Dan Pienaar Park.

== Education ==
The suburb contains a number of educational institutions, at various NQF levels.

=== Schools ===
- John Graham Primary School
- Timour Hall Primary School
- Plumstead Preparatory School
- Plumstead High School
- South Peninsula High School
- Norman Henshilwood High School
- St Anne's Primary School

=== Tertiary institutions ===
- Cape Town College of Fashion Design

There are also multiple preschools located in the suburb.

== Culture ==
In contrast to the bustling, vibrant nature of Cape Town's CBD and the Atlantic Seaboard, the Southern Suburbs (of which Plumstead is a part) is more laid-back and mellow. The leafy neighbourhoods within the area offer residents tree-lined streets for dog-walkers, older, larger homes with swimming pools, historic landmarks, wine farms, forests, and access to nature trails. Plumstead residents, as with others living in the Southern Suburbs, have easy access to sites like Groot Constantia and Kirstenbosch Botanical Gardens.

When it comes to purchasing homes, the Southern Suburbs tend to attract more affluent customers, in the context of Cape Town's real estate market.

Plumstead is home to the Plumstead Public Library and the Cape Town Cricket Club.

== Governance ==
Plumstead is divided between wards 62, 63, and 73 of the City of Cape Town metropolitan municipality. The current Ward Councilors are Eddie Andrews, Emile Langenhoven, and Carmen Siebritz respectively, all of whom are members of the country's second largest political party, and ruling party of Cape Town and the Western Cape, the Democratic Alliance. The area hosts a City of Cape Town Municipal Office and walk-in Motor Vehicle Registration Center, on the corner of Victoria and Main Roads.

== Commerce ==
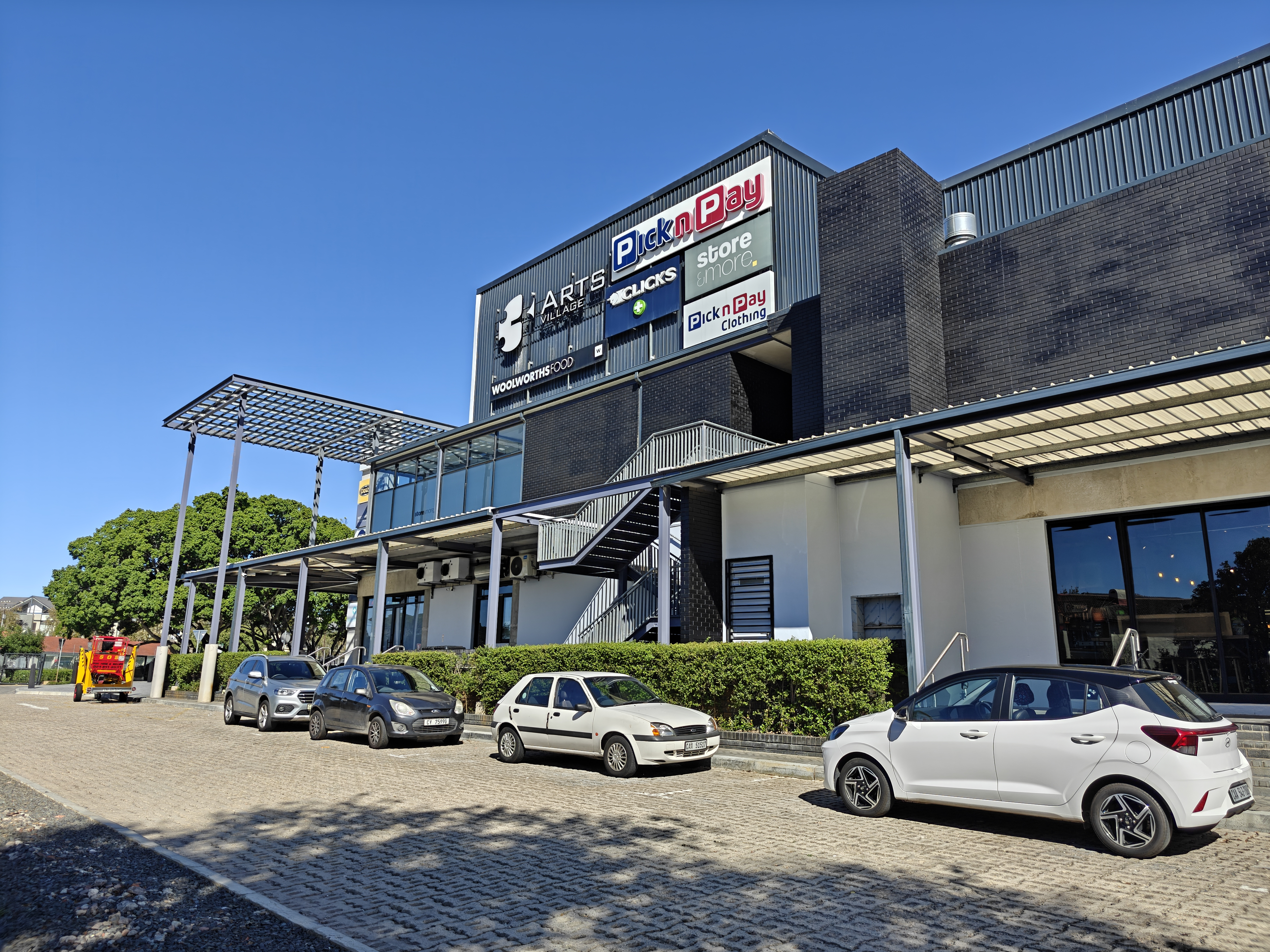
3Arts Village shopping centre

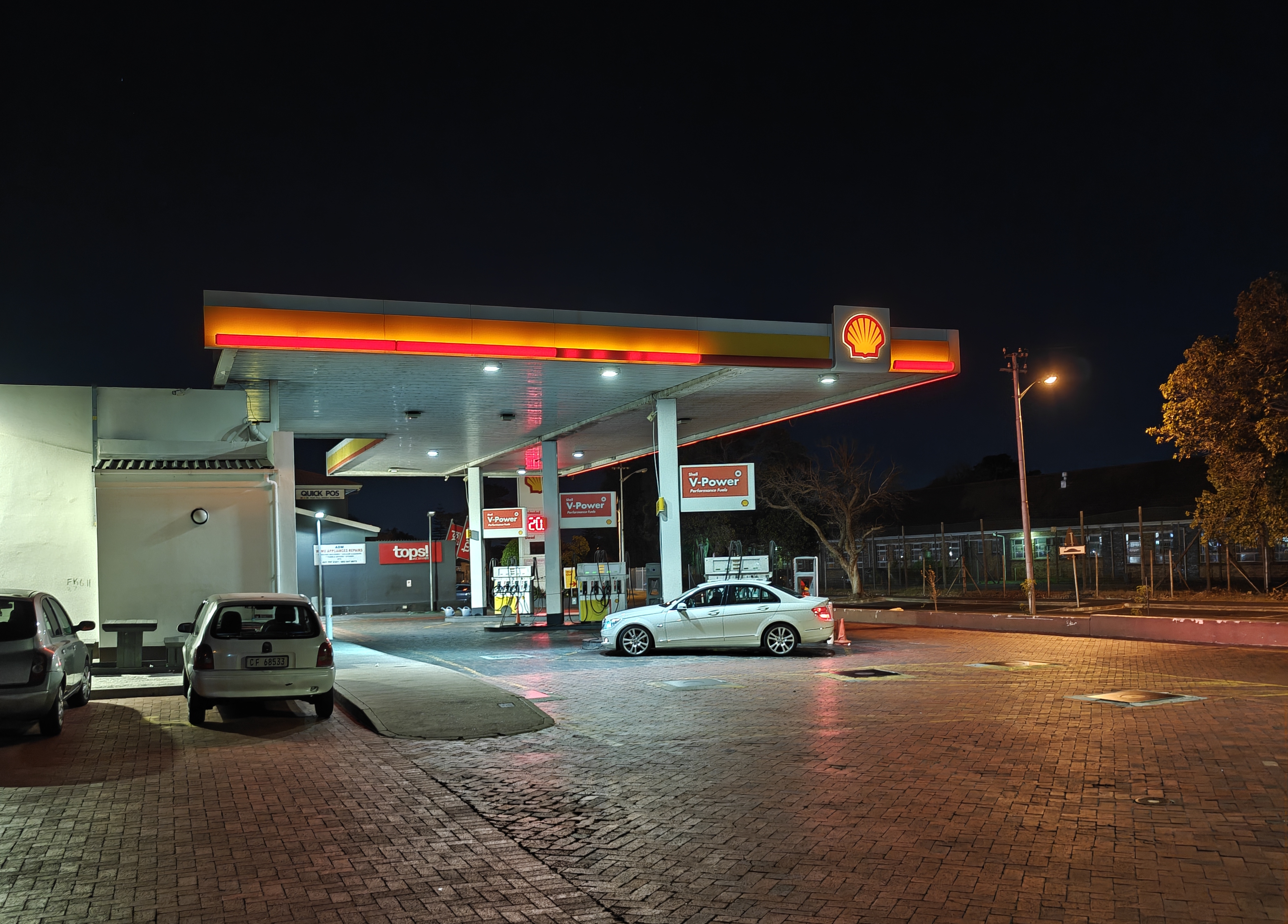
Shell gas station in Plumstead, Cape Town

Plumstead is home to numerous shopping centres, among which are:

- 3Arts Village
- Prospur Centre
- Pick n Pay Centre, Gabriel Road
- The Village Square, and
- Gabriel Place.

These centres feature numerous major South African supermarket chains, including Woolworths, Pick n Pay, and Spar.

The suburb is also home to the Mediclinic Constantiaberg hospital.

Major oil and gas companies Engen, Shell, and BP all have gas stations in different parts of Plumstead.

== Notable people ==
The writer J.M. Coetzee lived in a house in Plumstead with his family as a young boy. A photograph he took of his mother, Vera, standing outside the house with the family dog appears in the book JM Coetzee: Photographs from boyhood (Wittenberg, 2020).
