= Natangwe Ithete =

Namibian politician (born 1976)

Deputy Prime Minister of Namibia
- In office 21 March 2025 – 26 October 2025
- President: Netumbo Nandi-Ndaitwah
- Prime Minister: Elijah Ngurare
- Preceded by: John Mutorwa
- Succeeded by: Vacant

Minister of Industrialization, Mines and Energy
- In office 21 March 2025 – 26 October 2025
- President: Netumbo Nandi-Ndaitwah
- Prime Minister: Elijah Ngurare
- Preceded by: Tom Alweendo
- Succeeded by: Netumbo Nandi-Ndaitwah

Deputy Minister of Finance
- In office 21 March 2015 – 21 March 2020
- President: Hage Geingob
- Prime Minister: Saara Kuugongelwa
- Preceded by: Calle Schlettwein
- Succeeded by: Maureen Hinda-Mbuende

Personal details
- Born: 9 January 1976 (age 50)
- Party: SWAPO

Natangwe Paulus Ithete (born 9 January 1976) is a Namibian politician who served as Deputy Prime Minister and Minister of Industrialization, Mines, and Energy of the Republic of Namibia in 2025. He is also a legislator in the Parliament of Namibia as a member of the National Assembly. Ithete served in President Hage Geingob's administration as Deputy Minister of Finance from 2015 to 2020.

== Education ==
Ithete obtained a diploma in Human Resources and Labour Relations from the Academy of York in Randburg, South Africa. He also obtained a diploma in Property Finance and Economic Evaluation from Damelin, and a certificate in banking.

== Professional career ==
Ithete worked as an office administrator from 2000 to 2002. He then joined Agribank of Namibia and worked there until 2015. In 2013, Ithete became vice president of the Namibia Financial Institutions Union (Nafinu).

== Political career ==
Ithete is a member of SWAPO and held several positions in the SWAPO Party Youth League. He became a member of parliament in 2015. President Hage Geingob appointed him as deputy to the Minister of Finance. He served until 2020 but did not retain his cabinet seat in Geingob's second term, a development that was seen as a "surprise". In the 2020–2025 legislative period, he was the chairperson of the parliamentary standing committee on economics and public administration.

Ithete was appointed Deputy Prime Minister of Namibia, as well as Minister of Industrialization, Mines and Energy, on 21 March 2025. On 26 October 2025, he was dismissed from his ministerial position at the Ministry of Mines and Energy and from his role as Deputy Prime Minister. He remains a member of parliament. President Netumbo Nandi-Ndaitwah assumed the position of Minister of Mines and Energy herself.
