= Talentia Network =

Basque professional network platform

- Red Talentia
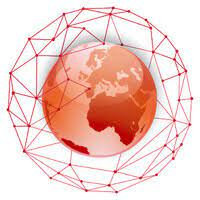
- Formation: 2013; 13 years ago
- Founder: Foral Government of Biscay
- Type: Platform
- Purpose: to unite highly qualified professionals in the innovation and knowledge (through a professional network)
- Location: Biscay, Basque Country, Spain
- Region served: Biscay; Basque Country
- Official language: Spanish; Basque

The Talentia Network is an associative professional platform promoted by the Foral Government of Biscay to unite professionals in the innovation and knowledge through a professional network, with the professional collaboration of different entities, companies or universities.

It was created in 2013 by the Department of Economic Promotion of the Foral Government of Biscay, a department headed by Imanol Pradales at that time, and it was later expanded in 2015 with different collaboration agreements with international companies, universities and other entities.

== History ==
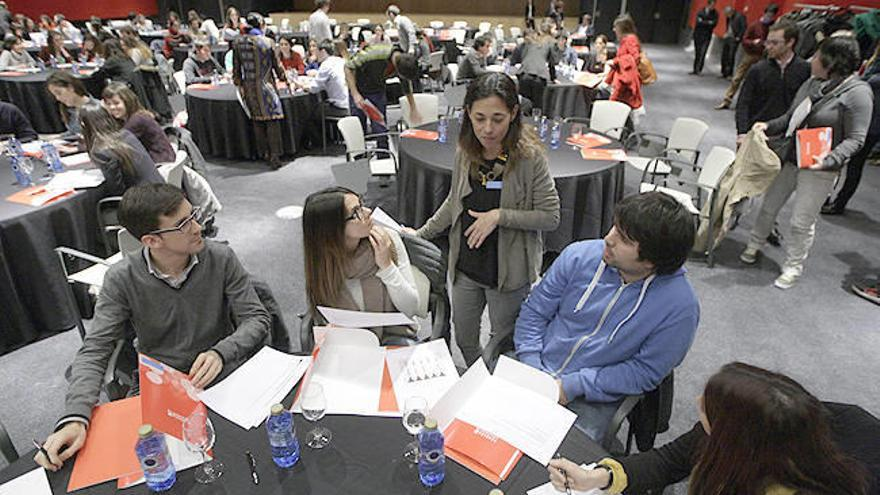
Talentia Network. General Meeting 2013. Bilbao Exhibition Centre (Bilbao, 2013).

In 2013, the Foral Government of Biscay created the Talentia Network, as a meeting and work point for young students and future professionals. The objective of this project was to "enhance the qualities of talented young people from the territory and, with them, Biscay also grows". In 2013, the network had 500 members, young students who had taken part in the four editions of the Talentia Programme" and "Talent pro Bizkaia". The first meeting was held in the auditorium of the Bilbao Exhibition Centre (BEC), in which more than a hundred members of the network came to the BEC auditorium to map, debate and imagine the present and future of Biscay. The head of government (General Deputy) José Luis Bilbao and the Deputy for Economic Promotion Imanol Pradales participated. As declared by head of government José Luis Bilbao: "We want to take into account the talented professionals to build the future of all Biscayans".

Little by little, the talentia network was completed with students and participants of the "Talentia Skills", "Talentia Programme" and "Talentia Challenge" programmes. In this way, the Bizkaia Talent agency selects students with the best university academic record and career (in each university degree) to carry out the Talentia Programme and once completed they become part of the Talentia Network. In addition, those students who had been admitted to one of the Bizkaia Talent scholarship programmes also become part of the network. With all this, the Talentia professional network was formed, as a meeting point and professional work.

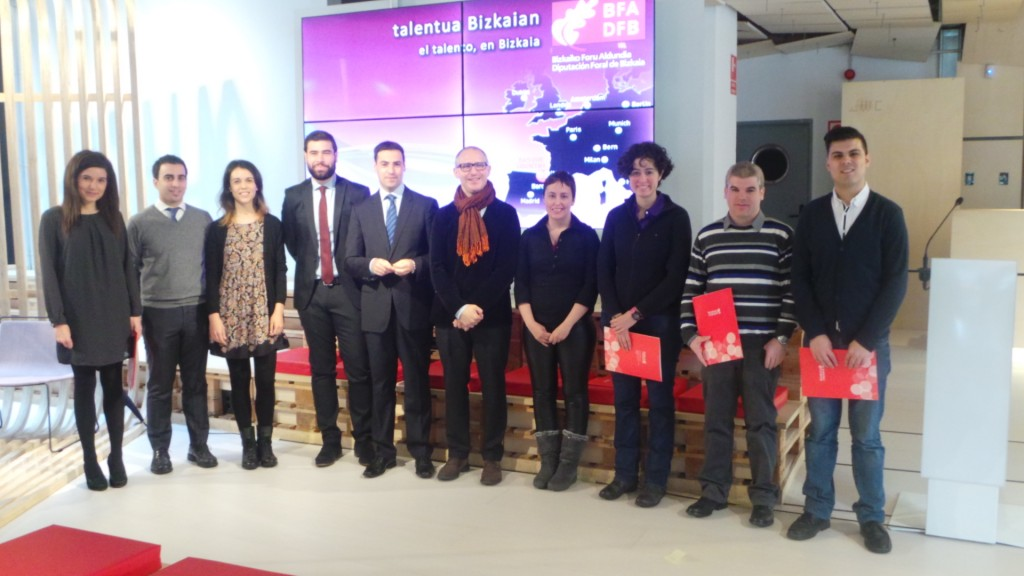
Imanol Pradales granting the Talentia Network Awards (Bilbao, 2015).

The objective of the network is the management of professional talent and the retention of highly qualified professionals. Especially in 2013, the so-called "brain drain" was greater than ever, so this network was established as a tool for talent to stay at home. Within the network, selected students are offered training, networking, business meetings, scholarship programmes, professional tutors,...

When it was created in 2013, the talentia network had barely 500 members. In 2019, the network had 1,500 members. As of December 31, 2021, the network had 2,100 members. All of them are highly qualified professionals with an excellent professional career in their respective fields. All of them were students selected by Bizkaia Talent and who had participated in one of the Talentia programmes.

== The "Be Basque Talent Network" initiative (2015) ==
In 2015, the Foral Government of Biscay in collaboration with the Bizkaia Talent agency expanded the network internationally with the "Be Basque Talent Network" project. The initiative sought to highlight professional talent around the world and ensure that highly qualified professionals with links to Biscay and Euskadi did not lose contact with the territory. As declared by Deputy General Unai Rementeria: "a network formed by human capital present in unimaginable places: in the UN, in the World Bank, in leading multinationals...".

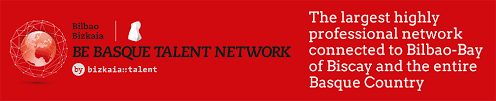
Be Basque Talent Network Logo

The objective of this project of 2015 is to connect international professionals who have some connection with Biscay and the Basque Country, and who are around the world, thus creating a large network of highly qualified professionals around the world. This network also joins the Talentia Network, thus forming a large professional network.

== Talentia Network members ==
In 2013 the talentia network had barely 500 members, in 2019, 1,500 members, and, as of December 31, 2021, the network had already 2,100 members.

Among the members of the Talentia Network are, among others, the Basque politician Alba García Martín, the Basque astrophysicist and Oxford and MIT scholar Josu Aurrekoetxea or the Basque lawyer and criminal defense lawyer Uxue Pilar (all of them selected by the Bizkaia Talent agency).

== See also ==
- Imanol Pradales
