= Postal orders of Namibia =

Postal orders have been issued in Namibia since it became independent in 1990. The first issues were overprinted in red 'REPUBLIC OF NAMIBIA' on the remainders of the postal orders of South West Africa.

== Namibian overprinted South West African postal orders ==
It is not yet known when these were first issued, nor is it known when these were exhausted and replaced by Namibia's own postal orders. These are bilingually inscribed in both Afrikaans and English. All issues after this one are inscribed only in English.

A 50c. postal order issued at Otavi on 25 November 1993 is known to be in a private collection in New Zealand.

== PT Namibia issue postal orders ==
These were first introduced in 1992. These have the PT Namibia logo, which includes an antelope's head (most likely that of a springbok or an impala) at the top of the front of the postal order. These remained in use, even after the introduction of the Namibian dollar in 1993.

== Namibia Post issue postal orders ==
These are known to have been issued during 1997. This issue has the stylised 'NP' logo. This issue is known for the denominations above N$1 being incorrectly expressed in the singular.

== NamPost issue postal orders ==
This issue also has the stylised 'NP' logo, but this has Namibia Post's name replaced by NamPost's name. These have been issued since 1999. This issue is also known for the denominations above N$1 being incorrectly expressed in the singular.
