= Governor of the Bank of Namibia =

Head of Namibia's central bank

The Governor is the official head of the Bank of Namibia. They are responsible for implementing Namibia's monetary policy and chairing the meetings of the bank's board of directors.

== List of governors of the Bank of Namibia ==
The governors of the Bank of Namibia from 1990 to date have been:

- Wouter Benard (16 June 1990 - 31 August 1991)
- Erik Lennart Karlsson (1 September 1991 - 31 December 1993)
- Jaafar bin Ahmad (1 January 1994 - 31 December 1996)
- Tom Alweendo (1 January 1997 - 25 March 2010)
- Ipumbu Shiimi (25 March 2010 - 1 June 2020)
- Johannes !Gawaxab (1 June 2020 - )
