= Erica Shafudah =

Namibian politician

The Honourable Erica Shafudah MP

Minister of Finance
- Incumbent
- Assumed office 22 March 2025
- President: Netumbo Nandi-Ndaitwah
- Preceded by: Iipumbu Shiimi

Personal details
- Born: 6 April 1963 (age 63) Eendadi da Shafudah village Ohangwena Region
- Party: SWAPO

Erica Paendelenga Shafudah (born 6 April 1963) is a Namibian politician and legislator in the National Assembly who is serving as the minister of finance since 22 March 2025.

== Early life and education ==
Born at Eendadi da Shafudah village in Ohangwena Region. Her parents are meme Rosalia Vanyenga yaShikola and tate Shafudah sha Heishi ya Nghililewanga. Her mother passed on while she was still a young girl, and she moved to Onamunama village to live with her aunt. In 1978 she crossed the Namibian border into Angola to go into exile to fight for independence. She was stationed at Cassinga Refugee Camp, which was later attacked on 4 May 1978. She survived that massacre, and she formed part of the SWAPO youth delegation that was sent to Cuba for studies. Shafudah holds a master of science in education from Havana, Cuba; a master of science in biostatistics from Limburg University, Diepenbeek, Belgium; a master of science in leadership and change management from Leeds, UK; and a diploma in accounting and finance from the Namibia University of Science and Technology.

== Career ==
Shafudah began her career as a mathematics teacher at Hambili Haufiku Senior Secondary School in the 1990s and later moved to Paresis Secondary School in Otjiwarongo. She later worked at the National Planning Commission from 1996 to 2002 in the capacity of chief development pioneer, senior development planner, and deputy director, respectively. In 2002 she joined the Ministry of Finance as the under secretary of the treasury; in 2004 she was appointed to serve as a deputy executive director, and in 2010 she was appointed as an executive director before she took an early retirement in 2021. In July 2021 Shafudah joined the United Nations (UN) World Food Programme as a deputy country director until March 2025.
