= Imanol Pradales =

Basque sociologist, university teacher and politician

The Most Excellent Imanol Pradales
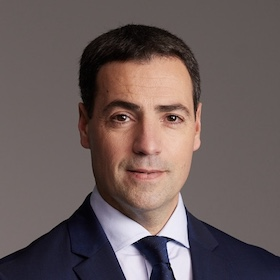
- Pradales in 2024

Lehendakari of the Basque Government
- Incumbent
- Assumed office 22 June 2024
- Monarch: Felipe VI
- Preceded by: Iñigo Urkullu
Biscay foral offices
2019–2024	Infrastructure and Territorial Development
2015–2019	Economic and Territorial Development
2011–2015	Economic Promotion

Member of the Basque Parliament
- Incumbent
- Assumed office 14 May 2024
- Constituency: Biscay

Personal details
- Born: Imanol Pradales Gil; 21 April 1975 (age 51) Santurtzi (Biscay), Spain
- Party: Basque Nationalist Party (since 2005)
- Spouse: Laura Sáez
- Children: 1
- Education: Asti Leku Ikastola; University of Deusto (Lic.); Technical University of Madrid (MA); University of Deusto (PhD); IE Business School (PgD)
- Occupation: Sociologist, university teacher, politician
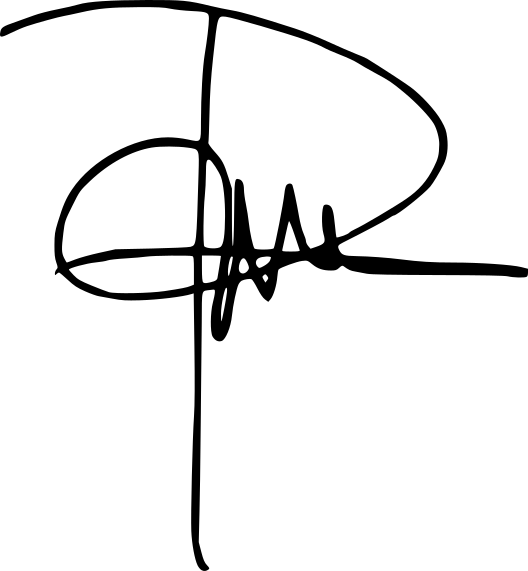
- Signature

Imanol Pradales Gil (born 21 April 1975) is a Basque sociologist, university teacher and politician from Spain who is serving as Lehendakari of the Basque Government since 2024. He is a member of the Basque Nationalist Party (EAJ-PNV).

He served as Foral Deputy (regional minister) of Infrastructure and Territorial Development of the Foral Council of Bizkaia from 2023 to 2024, upon stepping down to contest the 2024 Basque regional election. He has held the position of Foral Deputy for Economic Promotion (2011–2015), for Economic and Territorial Development (2015–2019) and for Infrastructure and Territorial Development (2019–2023).

Previously, he held the position of managing director of the public talent recruitment agency Bizkaia Talent, attached to the economic promotion department of the Foral Council of Bizkaia between 2007 and 2011.

== Early life and education ==
=== Early life and family ===
Imanol Pradales Gil was born on 21 April 1975 in Mamariga, a neighbourhood of Santurtzi, to a Basque nationalist family of non-Basque-speakers, the eldest of four children.

Pradales has displayed "having eight Castilian surnames", with his ancestors having immigrated to the Basque Country in the beginning of the twentieth century from Burgos, Valladolid and Cantabria. His father, Manuel Pradales, was born in Uribarri, Bilbao, and his mother, Rosa Gil, is from Santurtzi. Both of his parents joined the Basque Nationalist Party (PNV) the same day in 1976. His father had previously been an underground member of the party during the Francoist dictatorship, and during the Transition he served as a member of the first Municipal Board of Santurtzi. He owned a garage that closed due to the 2008 financial crisis. His mother owned a hairdressing salon that also closed, after which she worked as a cook in batzokis, the political bars of the PNV. His paternal grandfather fought in the Spanish Civil War on the Republican side, and was injured on the bombing of Otxandio.

=== Education ===
Pradales studied primary, secondary and Baccalaureate education at the Asti Leku Ikastola, a private Ikastola of Portugalete. There he was taught natural science and Spanish language by Iñigo Urkullu, a member of the PNV and future Lehendakari of the Basque Country.

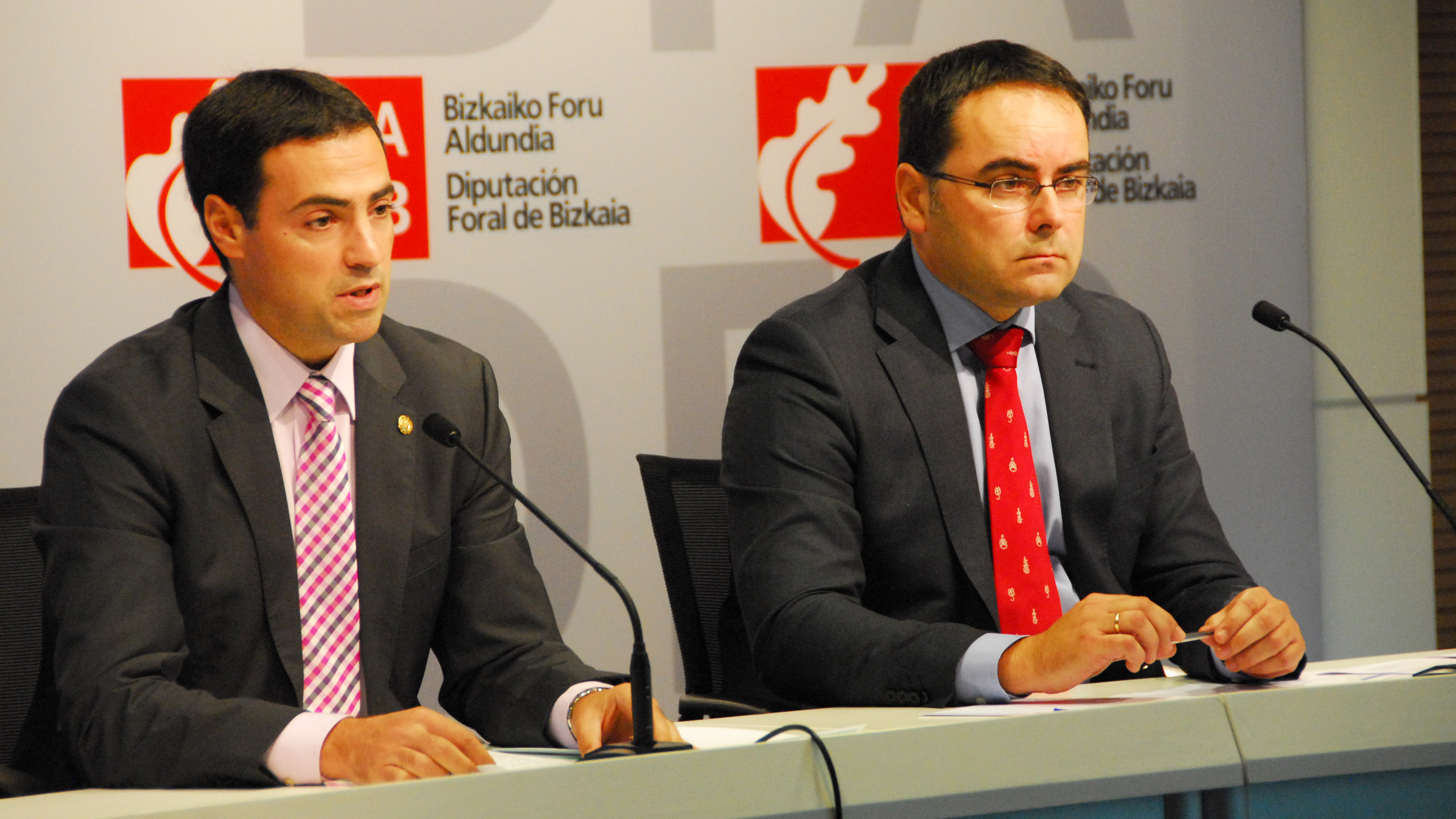
Imanol Pradales (left) gives a press conference on 23 January 2013.

Pradales earned a licentiate in Sociology and Political Science at the University of Deusto in 1997, where he enrolled thanks to the compensation that his grandfather had received for his war service. He later moved to Madrid for a year, where he completed and got a master's degree in knowledge management from the Technical University of Madrid in 1999. Back in Bilbao, between 2000 and 2004 he completed his doctoral studies at the University of Deusto, receiving his doctorate in Sociology and Political Science in 2004. In addition, he completed a postgraduate in Advanced Management in Executive Education at the IE Business School in Madrid in 2010.

He started working there as a university teacher at the University of Deusto, until he was granted a leave of absence upon entering politics in 2007.

== Political career ==
=== Foral Council of Bizkaia ===
In 2005, Iñigo Urkullu, then president of the Biscayne PNV, asked Pradales to write a scholarly paper about employment and competitiveness. In light of his research, in 2007, Pradales was offered to enter politics as the CEO of Bizkaia:xede —later renamed Bizkaia Talent— a Biscayne talent recruitment agency. In 2008, he became one of the coordinators of "Think Gaur", the PNV's think tank, following an offer by Urkullu.

Following the 2011 Basque foral elections, General Deputy (President) of Biscay José Luis Bilbao appointed Pradales as Foral Deputy (regional minister) of Economic Development of the Foral Council of Bizkaia (Government of Biscay). From 2015 until his resignation in 2024, he was reappointed in the cabinets of the General Deputies Unai Rementería and Elixabete Etxanobe as Foral Deputy of Economic and Territorial Development under the former, and as Foral Deputy of Infrastructure and Territorial Development under the latter. During his tenure, he was the main promoter of the extension of the Guggenheim Museum Bilbao into the Urdaibai estuary.

In 2015, Pradales came under criticism after being disclosed that while at office he had bought 7,200 shares of the construction company Sacyr, which had been awarded several projects in Bizkaia such as the Autzagane tunnels and the Igorre by-pass. Despite defending that the purchase "was legal and there is no conflict of interest" and ruling out his resignation, he acknowledged that he had made a "mistake" and sold all of his shares in the company.

Among the achievements during his time at the Foral Council of Bizkaia, the following stand out, in particular: the creation and launch of the Bizkaia Talent agency in 2007, and the creation of the Talentia Network in 2013, an interprofessional talent network, as well such as the expansion of the Network in 2015. Both initiatives are framed within talent management (talent attraction and retention).

Regarding the Talentia Network, launched during his time at the Foral Council of Bizkaia, when it was created in 2013 it had barely 500 members. In 2019, the network had 1,500 members. As of December 31, 2021, the network had 2,100 members. All of them were students selected by Bizkaia Talent and who had participated in one of the Talentia programmes. Curiously, among the members of the Network is the politician Alba García Martín, candidate for Lendakari and rival of Pradales in the 2024 Basque elections, who was selected by Bizkaia Talent during her time at the university.

=== President of the Basque Government ===
On 25 November 2023, the EAJ-PNV's National Executive Branch (Euzkadi Buru Batzar, EBB) appointed Pradales as the party's candidate for Lehendakari in the 2024 Basque regional election, replacing incumbent Lehendakari Iñigo Urkullu. The surprising dismissal of the incumbent Lehendakari and the appointment of a low-profile young man were seen as an attempt to promote a generational renewal in the party and to halt the growth of EH Bildu. He was unanimously ratified as candidate for Lehendakari on 27 January 2024 by the General Assembly of the party and selected as the leading candidate for Biscay.

Opinion polls for the election suggested a neck and neck race between the PNV and EH Bildu, with the latter being favoured to become the largest force in the Basque Parliament for the first time ever. Initially, the campaign stayed away from national politics and Basque independence, revolving around criticism of the PNV over the previous government's management of Osakidetza, the Basque health system, and the housing crisis. However, the campaign heated up in its last week following comments from EH Bildu's candidate, Pello Otxandiano, refusing to describe ETA as a "terrorist organization," which prompted criticism from the rest of the parties.

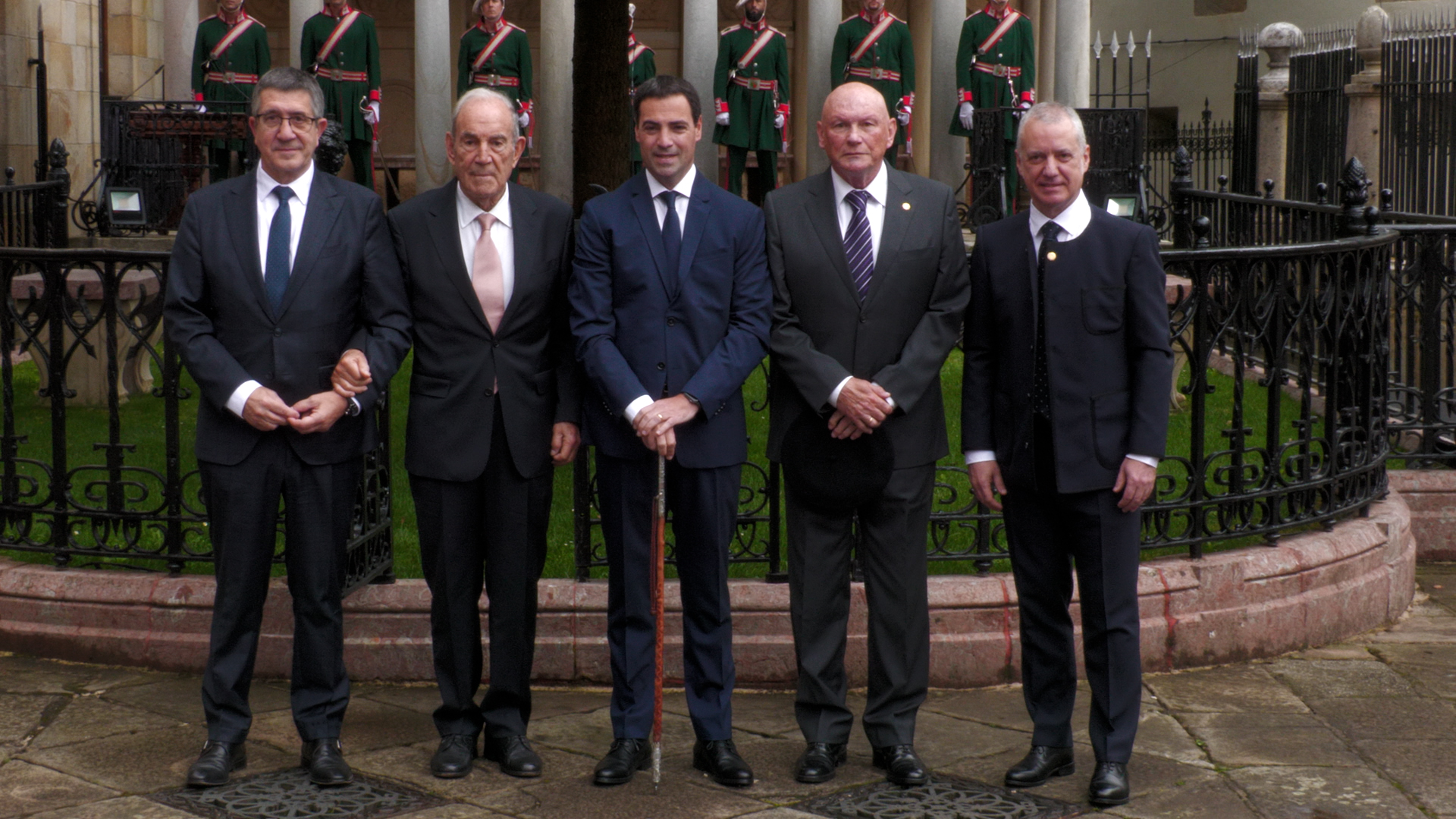
Patxi López, Carlos Garaikoetxea, Imanol Pradales, Juan José Ibarretxe and Iñigo Urkullu

On 16 April 2024, Pradales was attacked with pepper spray after attending a campaign rally at Barakaldo while he was heading to an electoral debate organized by the EITB. His aggressor, a 49-years-old man, was immediately arrested by the Ertzaintza and Pradales was admitted to the Gurutzeta hospital after losing his sight in the left eye. Nonetheless, Pradales eventually took part in the debate, where the attack was condemned by every other candidate.

In the election, the PNV won 35.2% of the vote, a decline of 3.7% compared to the previous election, but narrowly prevailed as the most voted party by almost 30,000 votes. However, the PNV tied at 27 seats with EH Bildu, losing 4 seats. The Socialist Party of the Basque Country–Basque Country Left (PSE–EE) emerged as the kingmaker with 12 seats, making a repetition of the incumbent coalition between the PNV and the PSE–EE the likeliest outcome.

On 22 June 2024, Pradales was sworn in as Lehendakari. On 24 June 2024, Pradales formed its Government (Pradales Government). In the distribution of government departments, he assigned the attraction and retention of talent to the lehendakari himself, an area in which Pradales specializes. He also announced that a Basque Talent Strategy was going to be created and developed. In addition, the Lendakari announced the creation and launch of the Basque Talent Agency. Similarly, at the end of 2024, it proposed the creation of a Basque talent "roster", a Basque network of highly qualified professionals.

== Personal life ==
Pradales is married to Laura Sáez, with whom he has a daughter.

== See also ==
- Iñigo Urkullu
- Bizkaia Talent
- Talentia Network

Political offices
Preceded by Iñigo Urkullu	Lehendakari of the Basque Country; 2024–present	Incumbent
