= Obeth Kandjoze =

Namibian politician (born 1966)

The Honourable Obeth Kandjoze
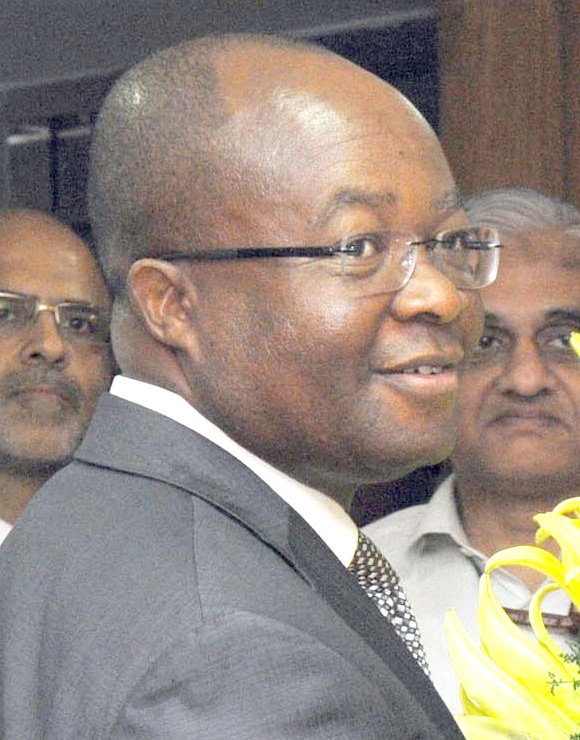

Director general of the National Planning Commission and Minister of Economic Planning
- In office 2018 – 21 March 2025
- President: Hage Geingob
- Prime Minister: Saara Kuugongelwa-Amadhila
- Preceded by: Tom Alweendo

Minister of Mines and Energy
- In office 2015–2018
- President: Hage Geingob
- Prime Minister: Saara Kuugongelwa-Amadhila
- Preceded by: Isak Katali
- Succeeded by: Tom Alweendo

Personal details
- Born: 9 August 1966 (age 60) Windhoek, South West Africa (now Namibia)
- Education: University of Cape Town; University of Helsinki
- Occupation: Politician
- Profession: Geologist

Obeth Mbuipaha Kandjoze (born 9 August 9, 1966 in Windhoek) is a Namibian politician of the ruling SWAPO Party. He was Namibia's director-general of the National Planning Commission and Minister of Economic Planning.

Kandjoze holds a Master of Science degree in geology from the University of Helsinki, Finland, a Bachelor of Science degree, also in geology, from the University of Cape Town. He has worked for the National Petroleum Corporation of Namibia since 1999 and was its CEO from 2012.

Kandjoze was appointed Minister of Mines and Energy by president Hage Geingob in 2015. In a cabinet reshuffle in February 2018 he swapped positions with Tom Alweendo and is since the director-general of the National Planning Commission and Minister of Economic Planning.
