= Gurutzi Arregi =

Spanish (Basque) ethnographer (1936–2020)

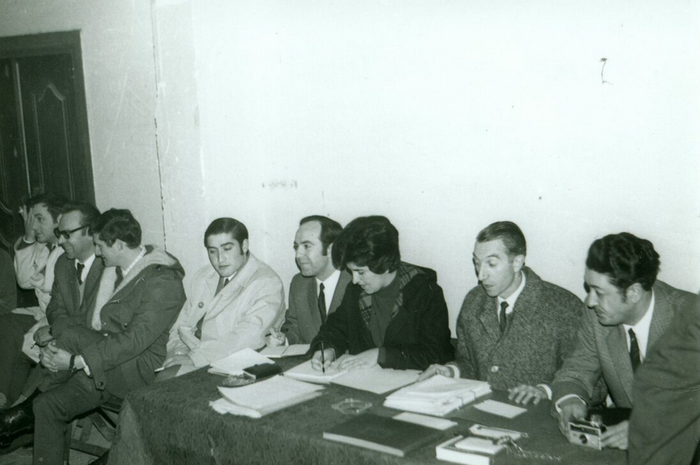
- (at the meeting of the Asociación Gerediagan)
- Born: Gurutzi Arregi Azpeitia; 12 November 1936; Lemoa, Biscay, Spain
- Died: 6 May 2020 (aged 83)
- Education: University of Deusto
- Known for: Coordinating the Ethnographic Atlas of the Basque Country
- Awards: "Carmelo Etxenagusia Honorable Mention" and medal "Pro Ecclesia et Pontifice" (2015)
- Scientific career
- Fields: Ethnography
- Workplaces: Mondragon University
- Thesis: Función de la ermita en la vecindad tradicional de Bizkaia

Gurutzi Arregi Azpeitia (12 November 1936 - 6 May 2020) was a Spanish-Basque ethnographer. She was the director of the Ethnographic Research Group Etniker-Bizkaia, which systematically collects ethnographic materials of the Basque Country. She was a co-founder and also worked in the Labayru Fundazioa. Arregi coordinated the Ethnographic Atlas of the Basque Country.

== Early life and education ==
Gurutzi Arregi Azpeitia was born in Lemoa, Biscay, on 12 November 1936. Her father was Daniel Arregi from Lemoa and his mother was Arantzazu Azpeitia from Areatza. Gurutzi was the oldest of six siblings. Due to the Spanish Civil War, the family had to leave Lemoa. After living in Enkarterri and Deusto, the family arrived in Durango when Gurutzi was about four years old, remaining there until she moved to the Orue residence in Euba.

Arregi graduated in Political Science and Sociology at the University of Deusto. At the same university, she received her doctorate with the thesis, Función de la ermita en la vecindad tradicional de Bizkaia (Function of the hermitage in the traditional neighborhood of Bizkaia).

== Career ==
From 1972 to 1985, she worked with the Basque priest and anthropologist Jose Migel Barandiaran, founder of Etniker-Bizkaia which, since 1973, has been systematically collecting ethnographic materials from the Basque Country. Arregi coordinated the Ethnographic Atlas of the Basque Country with the help of the governments of the Basque Autonomous Community and the Autonomous Community of Navarre5. Within this project, volumes have been published on, Alimentación Doméstica (domestic food) (1991), Juegos Infantiles (children's games) (1993), Ritos Funerarios (funeral rites) (1995), Ritos del Nacimiento al Matrimonio (rites from birth to marriage) (1997), Ganadería y Pastoreo en Vasconia (livestock and pastoralism in Vasconia) (2000) and Medicina Popular (popular medicine) (2004), among others.

Arregi taught courses on Cultural Anthropology at the Eskoriatza Teacher Training School (now Mondragon University) from 1982 to 1984. She was director of the Ethnography Department of the Labayru Institute of Bilbao and a member of the board of trustees that manages the Museum of Archaeology, Ethnography and History of Bilbao from 1981 to 1989. She was deputy secretary of Basque Studies Society (1979-1984), president of the Anthropology-Ethnography Department (1979-1986), and secretary-manager (1982-1990). She published Inmemoriam de nuestro maestro don José Miguel de Barandiarán, a tribute, on the occasion of his death in 1991.

Arregi was a councilor in Durango's first post-Frankist council. She was also the promoter of the Museo de Arte e Historia de Durango. She was one of the first members of the Asociación Gerediaga, and served as secretary in the organization. She also participated in several other cultural movements, such as the creation of the Kurutziaga school in Durango.

== Death and legacy ==
Gurutzi Arregi Azpeitia died on 6 May 2020.

In October 2020, the City Council of Durango started the procedure to name Arregi as an "adopted daughter", in response to a request made by about ten people from Durango. All the councilors who made up the municipal council unanimously decided to start the nomination process. On 12 November 2020, the anniversary of Arregi's birth, the Durango city council named her "adopted daughter", unanimously, and gave her a tribute ceremony at the San Agustin Kultur Gunea (San Agustin cultural center).

== Awards and honours ==
In October 2015, Arregi was awarded the "Carmelo Etxenagusia Honorable Mention" and medal "Pro Ecclesia et Pontifice" by the Patrimonio Artístico of the Roman Catholic Diocese of Bilbao, "mainly due to her work in the compilation and recovery of the material and immaterial heritage and the diffusion of the artistic and cultural heritage of the Diocese of Bilbao".

== Selected works ==
- Ermitas de Bizkaia (1987)
- Alimentación Doméstica (1991)
- Juegos Infantiles (1993)
- Ritos Funerarios (1995)
- Ritos del Nacimiento al Matrimonio (1997)
- Origen y significación de las ermitas de Bizkaia (1999)
- Ganadería y Pastoreo en Vasconia (2000)
- Medicina Popular (2004)
- Casa y Familia
- Inmemoriam de nuestro maestro don José Miguel de Barandiarán
