= Johannes ǃGawaxab =

Namibian central bank governor

- Born: 1956 (age 69–70); South West Africa (now Namibia)
- Citizenship: Namibian citizenship
- Education: University of South Africa (Bachelor of Arts) (Master of Business Leadership); Kingston Business School (Master of Arts)
- Occupations: Businessman, central bank governor
- Title: Governor of the Bank of Namibia

Johannes ǃGawaxab is a Namibian businessman who was appointed Governor of the Bank of Namibia, the country's central bank and national banking regulator, on 21 April 2020. He assumed his new office on 3 June 2020.

== Background and education ==
ǃGawaxab was born in what was then South West Africa, and he attended local schools for his primary and secondary education. He holds a Bachelor of Arts degree obtained from the University of South Africa (UNISA), in 1989. His degree of Master of Business Leadership (MBL), was obtained from the UNISA as well in 1994. His third degree, a Master of Arts, was awarded by the Kingston Business School, in London, United Kingdom. He also has a postgraduate Certificate in Leadership from the London Business School. In 2007, he studied at Harvard Business School, in an Advanced Management Program.

== Career ==
Early in his career, ǃGawaxab worked as an executive of Old Mutual, the South African-based financial services conglomerate. While there he rose to the level of CEO of Old Mutual Africa, serving in that capacity for nine years. In 2015, he took early retirement from Old Mutual and he started Eos Capital, a Namibian private equity firm with over N$500 million (US$30 million) under management.

At the same time, he served on the boards of several parastatals and many private businesses, serving as the chairman, on the majority of them. The parastatals that he chaired included the Namibian Social Security Fund and the National Petroleum Corporation of Namibia (Namcor), the oil and gas company owned by the government of Namibia.

As Governor of the Bank of Namibia, ǃGawaxab replaced Ipumbu Shiimi, who was named the Finance Minister of Namibia.

In December 2021, Johannes !Gawaxab was reappointed to a new five year term as the Governor of the Bank of Namibia. His two deputies are Ebson Uanguta and Leonie Dunn.
