= Herrigel =

Herrigel is a surname. Notable people with the surname include:

- Eugen Herrigel (1884–1955), German philosopher
- Otto Herrigel (1937–2013), Namibian businessman and politician
