= Otto Herrigel =

Namibian businessman and politician (1937–2013)

The Honourable Otto Herrigel

Minister of Finance
- In office 21 March 1990 – 10 April 1992
- President: Sam Nujoma
- Preceded by: Position established
- Succeeded by: Gert Hanekom

Personal details
- Born: 27 June 1937 Walvis Bay
- Died: 13 May 2013 (aged 75) Windhoek
- Party: SWAPO
- Spouse: Karin Herrigel
- Children: 2
- Education: University of Heidelberg; University of Basel
- Occupation: Politician
- Profession: Lawyer

Otto Herrigel (27 June 1937 – 13 May 2013) was a Namibian businessman, and politician. He served as Namibia's first Minister of Finance between 1990 and 1992.

Herrigel was born in Walvis Bay and grew up in Swakopmund. He studied economics at University of Heidelberg, and in 1971 obtained a doctoral degree from University of Basel, his thesis was about the demographic and economic development of South West Africa since 1921.

A member of SWAPO since before Independence of Namibia, Herrigel worked as a businessman and farmer, before he was appointed Namibia's first Minister of Finance on 21 March 1990. Prominent businessman and then-Chairman of the Chamber of Commerce Harold Pupkewitz commented "Dr Herrigel [is a] man of decision-making abilities and sound judgement". Herrigel resigned in 1992, reportedly due to differences with president Sam Nujoma over fiscal policy and the procurement of a presidential aircraft. Afterwards Herrigel was on the board of the Bank of Namibia (1998–2008), and on the board of directors of TransNamib (2001–2002).

Herrigel and his wife Karin raised two GDR kids as foster children - children who had been removed from their parents and brought up in the German Democratic Republic.
