= Marina Sáenz =

Professor at the University of Valladolid

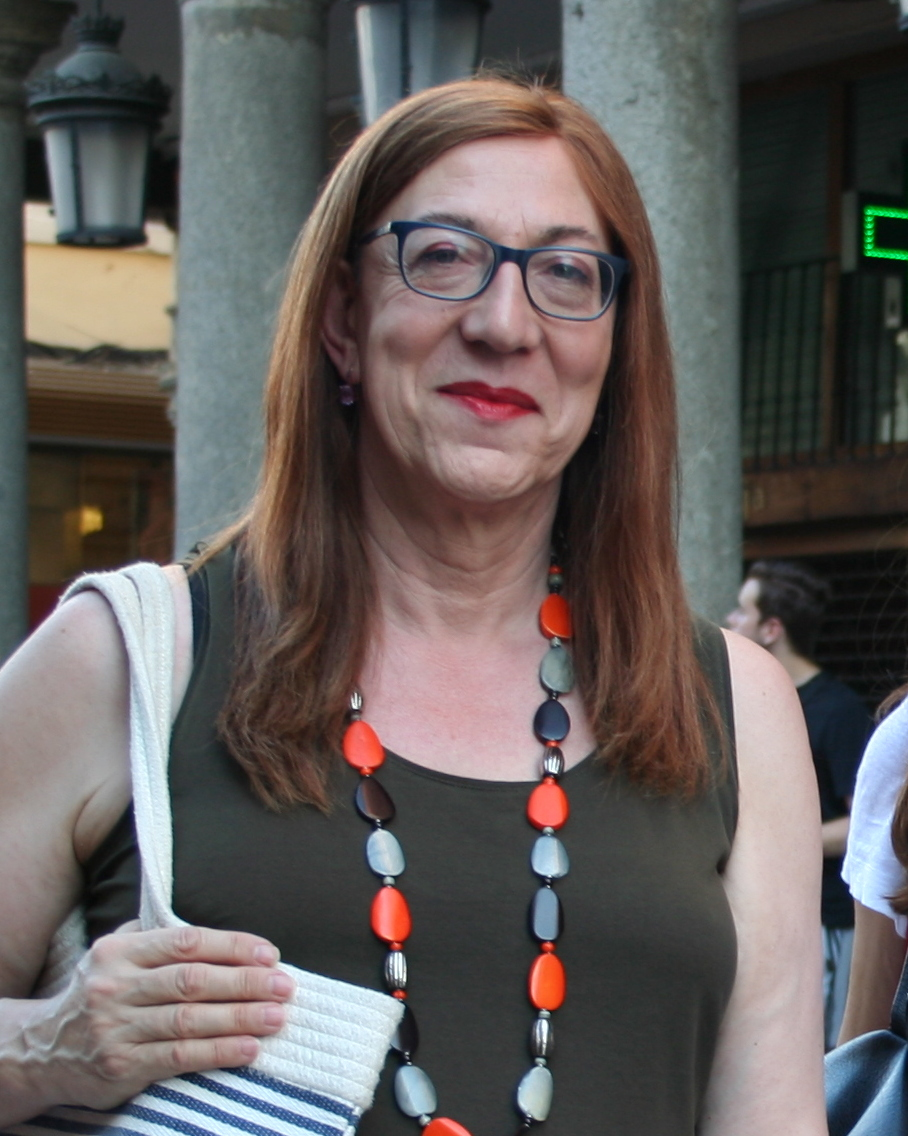
- Sáenz in 2022
- Born: 1970 (age 55–56); San Sebastián, Spain
- Education: University of Deusto
- Occupations: Jurist; University professor; LGBTQ activist

Marina Echebarría Sáenz (San Sebastián, c. 1970), more commonly known as Marina Sáez, is a Spanish jurist, University professor of Commercial Law at the University of Valladolid and LGBT activist. In 2020 she became the first trans woman full professor in Spain.

== Career ==
Born as Joseba Aitor Echebarría Sáenz, she studied Law at the University of Deusto and obtained a doctorate from the University of Valladolid with a thesis entitled The franchise contract: delimitation and content of internal relations. She is the director of the commercial law department at the Faculty of Law of the University of Valladolid, where she has been a tenured professor. Since 2020, she has been accredited as a full professor, making her the first openly trans woman to achieve accreditation to a professorship in Spain.

She is the author and/or coordinator of eight books, more than sixty articles in scientific journals and book chapters, has participated in eleven research projects, eleven agreements and in a multitude of conferences, courses and seminars on various legal topics. As an activist for LGBT+ rights, particularly for the rights of the trans community, she has collaborated in the drafting of several regional laws on gender identity, and was part as an expert of the working group that achieved the approval of law 3/2007 on the registration rectification of the mention relating to the sex of persons. She has collaborated in numerous national and international forums on identity matters.

She is also a member of the Institute for European Studies (University of Valladolid) and the Academic Network of Competition Law. She specializes in Commercial Distribution Law, Competition law, and Law of new technologies, subjects in which she has diverse works.

In September 2022, she was appointed Secretary of LGBTIQ+ Rights and Freedoms of Sumar Movement.

== Works ==
- 1995 – El contrato de franquicia: definición y conflictos en las relaciones internas. McGraw-Hill Interamericana de España. ISBN 84-481-1646-1 (The franchise contract: definition and conflicts in internal relations.)
- 2001 – El comercio electrónico. Edisofer. ISBN 84-89493-57-X (E-commerce.)
- 2011 – La aplicación privada del derecho de la competencia. Lex Nova. ISBN 8498983398 (The private application of competition law.)
- 2011 – Private Enforcement of Competition Law. ISBN 8498983339
