= Iipumbu Shiimi =

Namibian economist and politician (born 1969)

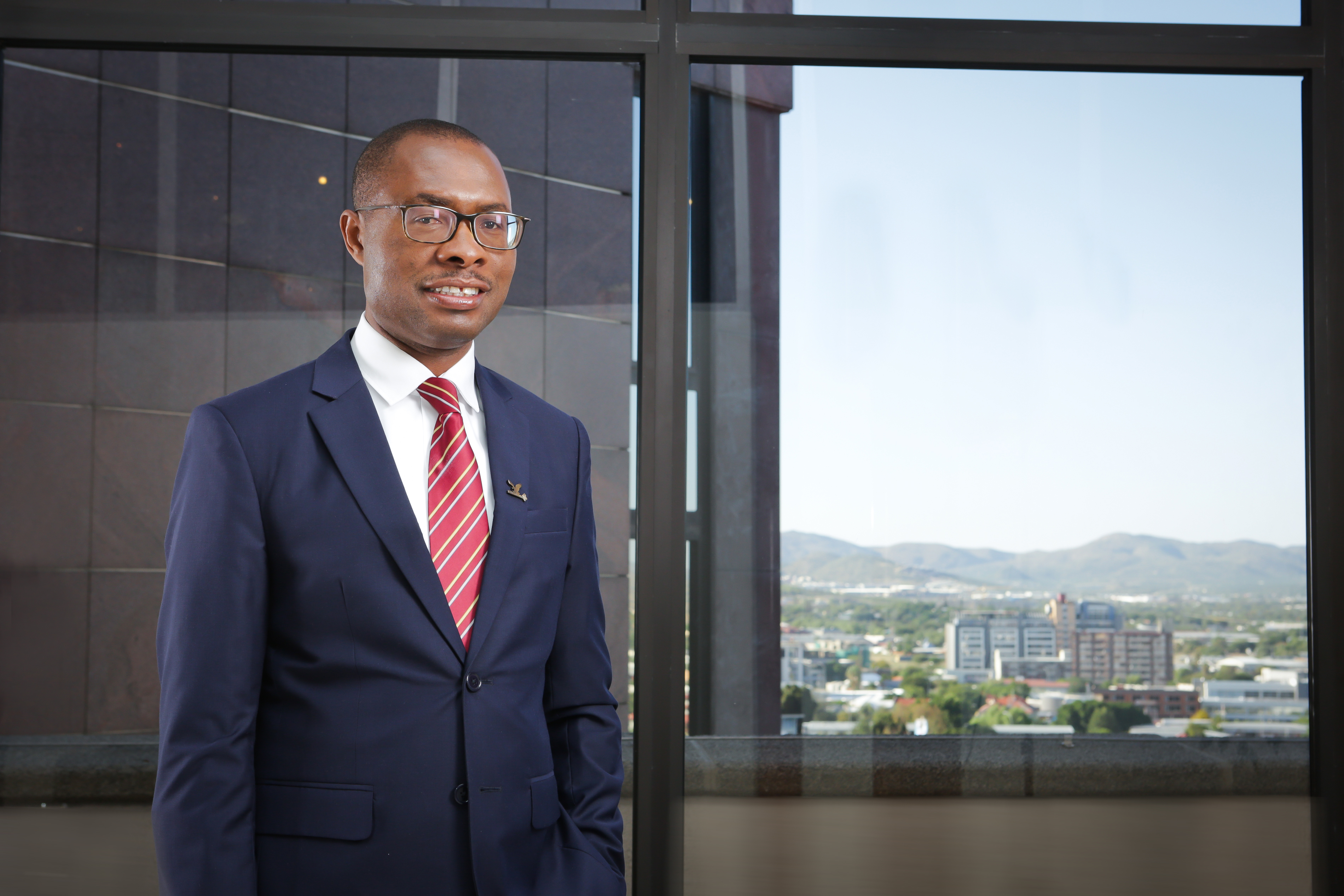

Minister of Finance
- In office 21 March 2020 – 21 March 2025
- President: Hage Geingob
- Prime Minister: Saara Kuugongelwa-Amadhila
- Preceded by: Calle Schlettwein
- Succeeded by: Erica Shafudah

Governor of the Bank of Namibia
- In office 25 March 2010 – 1 June 2020
- President: Hifikepunye Pohamba
- Prime Minister: Nahas Angula; Hage Geingob; Saara Kuugongelwa-Amadhila
- Preceded by: Tom Alweendo
- Succeeded by: Johannes !Gawaxab

Personal details
- Born: 1969 (age 56–57) Ontana, Omusati Region
- Education: University of London
- Occupation: Politician
- Profession: Economist

Iipumbu Wendelinus Shiimi is a Namibian economist and politician who served as the Minister of Finance from 2020-2025. Before that, he served as the Bank of Namibia governor from 2010 until 2020.

== Early life and education ==
Shiimi holds a Master of Science degree in Financial Economics (1998) and a Postgraduate Diploma in Economics (Economic Principles) from the University of London. He also holds a Diploma in Foreign Trade and Management from the Maastricht School of Management in the Netherlands, an Honours degree in Economics from the University of Western Cape in South Africa, and a Bachelor of Commerce degree in Economics and Accounting from the University of Western Cape. He underwent specialized training in Management from the University of Stellenbosch and Wits Business School, and other specialized training in economics and finance in Tanzania and the USA, as well as at the Bank of England and the Reserve Bank of South Africa.

== Career ==
Shiimi started working at the Namibia Economic Policy Research Unit (NEPRU) in 1994. He joined the Bank of Namibia as a Senior Researcher in the Research Department and became a Manager of the Economics Division in the same department in 1997. In 1999, he became Manager of the Modelling and Forecasting Division in the Research Department. In 2000, he took over as Manager of the Statistics Division in the Research Department. In 2001, he became the Deputy Head of the Research Department, and in 2002, he became the Chief Economist and Head of the Research Department. In June 2006, Shiimi became a Senior Manager in the Banking Supervision Department until his appointment in November 2006 as Assistant Governor. In this role, he was responsible for providing strategic direction to the operations of the Bank, which included managing foreign exchange reserves, banking supervision, economic stability, and financial monitoring.

Shiimi was appointed as the new central bank chief on March 25, 2010, by President Hifikepunye Pohamba. He took over from Tom Alweendo, who was appointed Director-General of the Namibian National Planning Commission and later Minister of Mines and Energy. President Hage Geingob re-appointed him to a second term in December 2016.

== Other activities ==
- International Monetary Fund (IMF), Ex-Officio Member of the Board of Governors (2010–2020)
- World Bank, Ex-Officio Alternate Member of the Board of Governors (2010–2020)
