= Ministry of Mines and Energy (Namibia) =

Government ministry of Namibia

The Namibian Ministry of Mines and Energy (MME) was established at Namibian independence in 1990. The first Namibian minister of mines and energy was Andimba Toivo ya Toivo, a liberation fighter posthumously declared a national hero of Namibia. The current interim mines and energy minister is president Frans Kapofi, after Natangwe Ithete was dismissed on 26 October 2026.

== Ministers ==
All mines and energy ministers in chronological order are:

#	Picture	Name	(Birth–Death)	Party	Term start	Term end
Minister of Mines and Energy
1		Andimba Toivo ya Toivo	1924–2017	SWAPO	1990	1999
2		Jesaya Nyamu	1942–	SWAPO	1999	2002
3		Nickey Iyambo	1936–2019	SWAPO	2002	2005
4		Erkki Nghimtina	1948–	SWAPO	2005	2010
5		Isak Katali	1958–	SWAPO	2010	2015
6		Obeth Kandjoze	1966–	SWAPO	2015	2018
7		Tom Alweendo	1958–	SWAPO	2018	2025
8		Natangwe Ithete	1976–	SWAPO	21 March 2025	26 October 2025
		Frans Kapofi (interim)	1953–	SWAPO	28 October 2025	

== See also ==
- Mining in Namibia
- Economy of Namibia
