= Kaire Mbuende =

Namibian politician

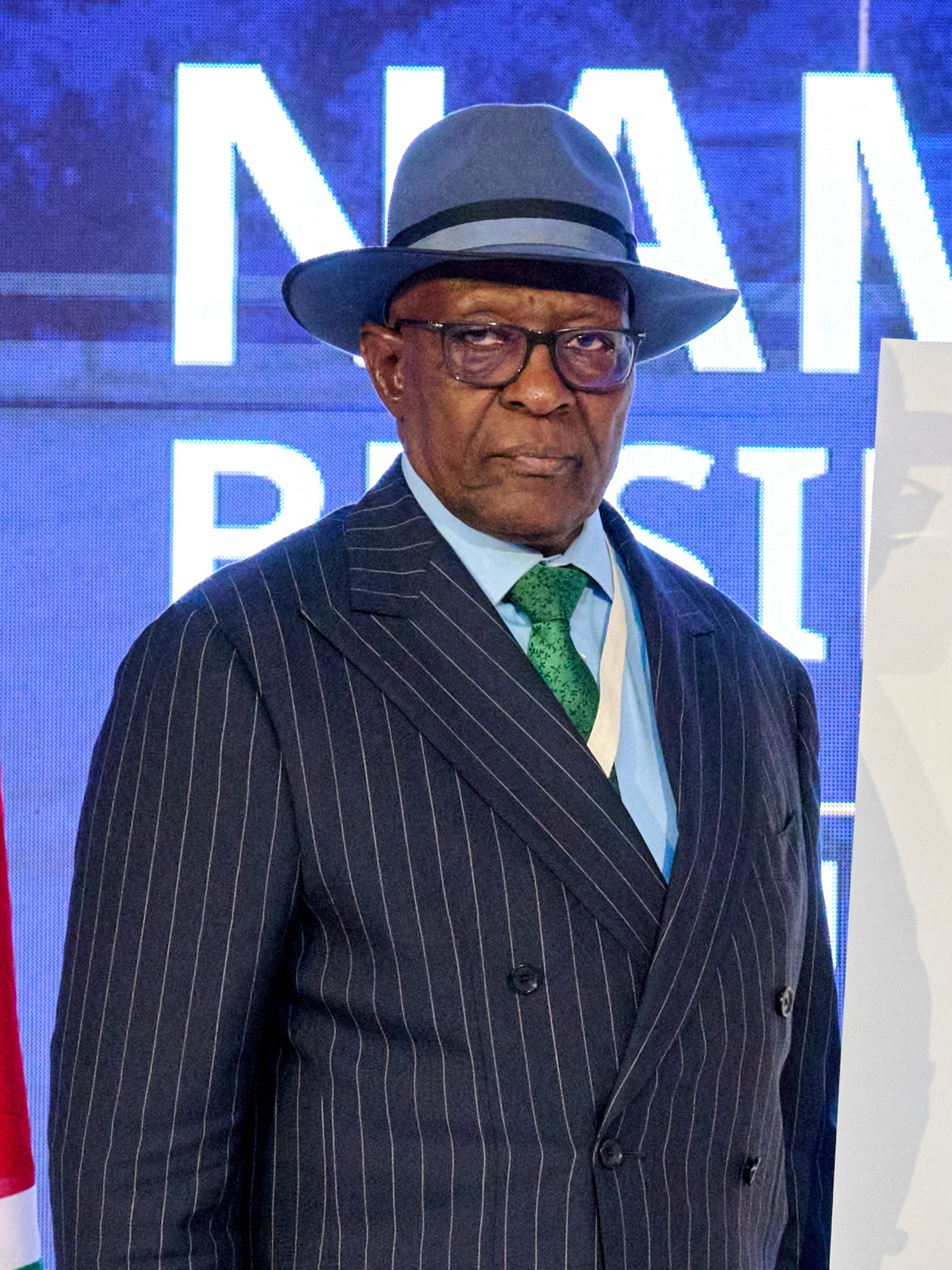
Mbuende in 2026

Kaire Munionganda Mbuende (born 28 November 1953) is a Namibian politician and diplomat. Mbuende served as Namibian ambassador to the United Nations from August 2006 to December 2010. An ethnic Herero, Mbuende has been a high-level member of the ruling SWAPO Party of Namibia since 1972, and served among others as information officer in Lusaka, Zambia. From 2016 to 2020 Mbuende served as ambassador of Namibia to the European Union, Belgium and Luxembourg.

Mbuende is married to fellow politician Maureen Hinda-Mbuende. They have six children.

On Heroes' Day 2014 he was conferred the Excellent Order of the Eagle, Second Class.

In March 2025, he was appointed Director-General, National Planning Commission by Netumbo Nandi-Ndaitwah.
