= Isak Katali =

Namibian politician

The Honourable Isak Katali
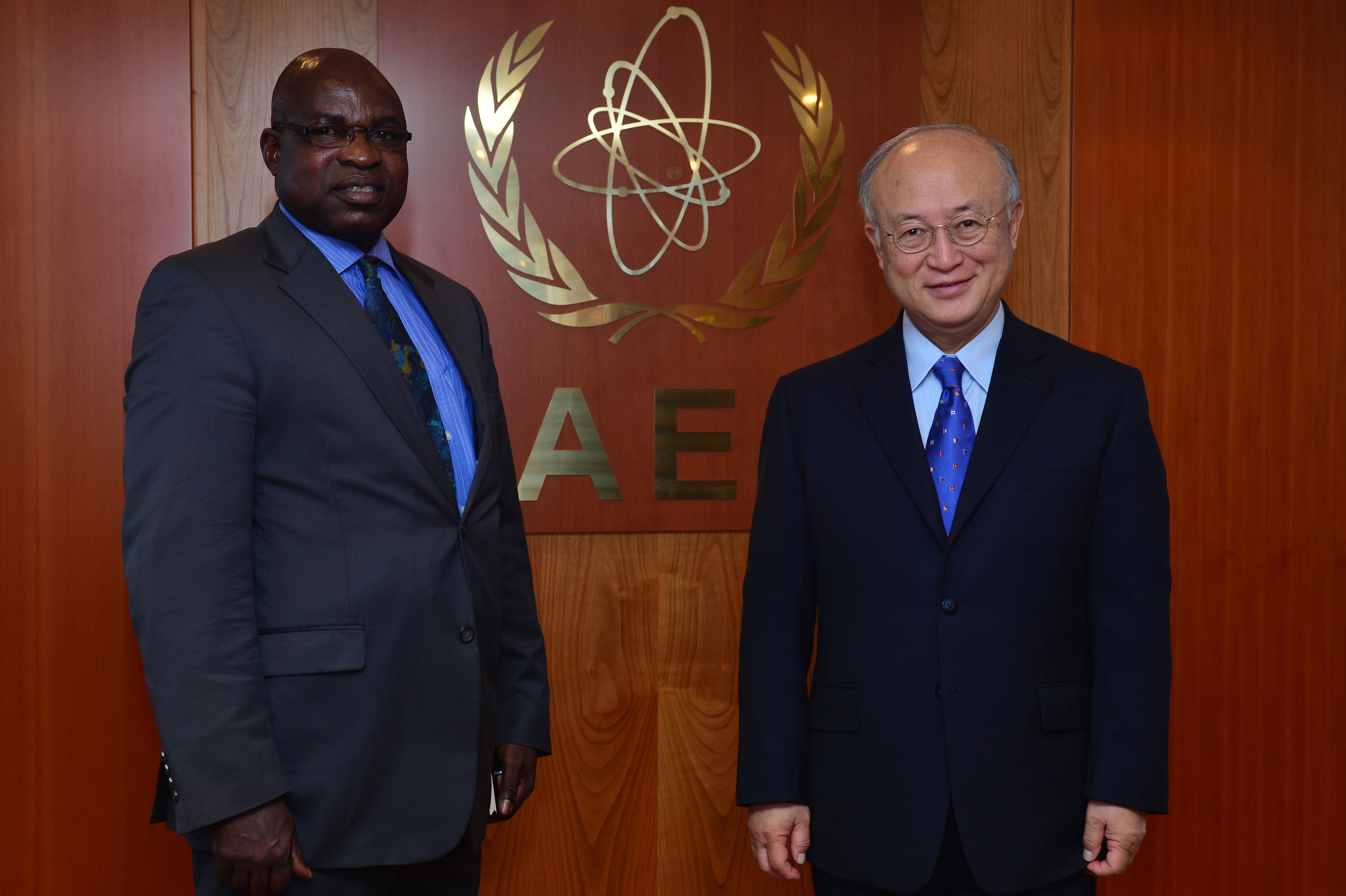
- Isak Katali (left) & Yukiya Amano

Minister of Mines and Energy
- In office 2010–2015
- President: Hifikepunye Pohamba
- Prime Minister: Nahas Angula; Hage Geingob
- Preceded by: Erkki Nghimtina
- Succeeded by: Obeth Kandjoze

Deputy Minister of Agriculture, Water and Forestry
- In office 2008–2010
- President: Hifikepunye Pohamba
- Prime Minister: Nahas Angula

Deputy Minister of Lands and Resettlement
- In office 2000–2008
- President: Sam Nujoma; Hifikepunye Pohamba
- Prime Minister: Hage Geingob; Theo-Ben Gurirab; Nahas Angula

Personal details
- Born: 5 January 1958 (age 68) Eunda, Omusati Region, South West Africa (now Namibia)
- Education: University of the Witwatersrand; University of Wales
- Occupation: Politician
- Profession: Teacher

Henry Isak Amalovu Katali (born 5 January 1958 in Eunda, Omusati Region) is a Namibian politician.

From 1988 to 1990, Katali studied for a bachelor's degree with honours at the University of Bristol in the United Kingdom. From 2001, Katali completed a master's degree from the University of the Western Cape outside of Cape Town in South Africa.

A member of SWAPO, Katali worked as an educator, both as a teacher and in administration around Ondangwa from 1987 to 2000. From 1990 to 1995, Katali worked as the regional secretary for the Namibia National Teachers Union (NANTU).

In 2000, he was selected by president Sam Nujoma as one of six appointed but non-voting member to the National Assembly of Namibia and immediately became deputy Minister of Lands and Resettlement. He was elected on the SWAPO party list in 2004 and subsequently re-appointed to the cabinet of Hifikepunye Pohamba. In 2008 he was moved to deputise the Minister of Agriculture, Water and Forestry, and in 2010 he was promoted to Minister of Mines and Energy. He served in that position until 2015.
