= Francisco González Bree =

Spanish artist and writer (born 1968)

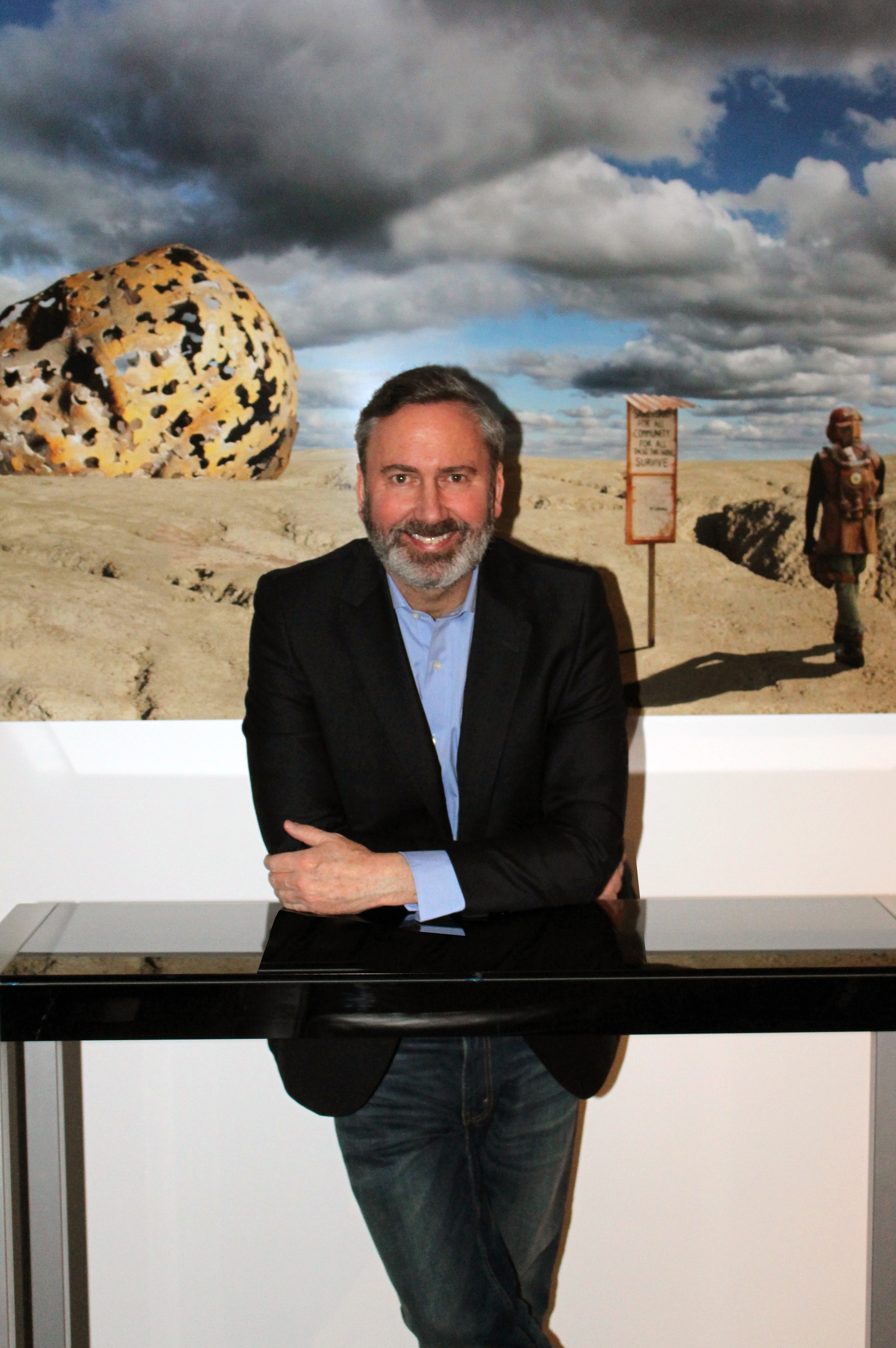
- Bree with one of his works
- Born: 1968 (age 57–58); Bilbao, Spain
- Other name: Paco Bree
- Education: Kingston University; Universidad de Deusto
- Occupations: Corporate executive Professor, writer, researcher and artist
- Employer(s): Inndux, Deusto Business School
- Website: www.pacobree.com

Francisco González Bree (born July 3, 1968), also known as Paco Bree, is a Spanish corporate executive, professor, writer, researcher, artist and a professional in the field of creativity and innovation. In addition to his academic contribution, he is business advisor and regular collaborator in different media such as El Español, on matters related to innovation and creativity, and the importance of these issues in companies, people and society.

== Biography ==
Francisco González Bree is Doctor in Business Administration from the Kingston University School of Business (2013), has a Master's in Business Administration from the University of Edinburgh Business School (2000) and a Master's in Business Innovation from the University of Deusto (2010). He is professor and director of innovation programmes at Deusto Business School and professor at Advantere School of Management. He has given classes in different centers such as ESADE, Escuela Loyola Leadership, Factoría cultural and in 2016 he participated in TEDx giving a conference on innovation. In the field of private companies, he is currently CEO at Inndux, cofounder at Paradima.io, and previously he worked in multinationals and technology companies such as Anboto (named Best Start-up in the World 2010), Sherpa.ai, Wincor Nixdorf, Computershare, RBS.

== Columnist and blogger ==
González Bree is a regular columnist for the newspaper El Español, through the sections "Notas Digitales" within Invertia D + I, and "Objetivos Bree" within Enclave ODS. Previously he directed a column at La Razón, on his blog "Innovadores". He also directed another blog on creativity, technology and Innovation entitled "Converting novelty in value "within the business blogs of Cinco Días, and one on a similar subject in El Mundo. He is a specific contributor to different media such as El País, ABC, CNN.

== Artistic work ==
His artistic work is characterized by his futuristic collages. "He uses digital photo collage techniques to create worlds, between pop, dreamlike and apocalyptic, populated by science fiction characters". To illustrate his articles on creativity, González Bree began making digital collages. His production was recognized by critics, for which he has been invited

to participate in different exhibitions. In his works he recreates "a series of unusual worlds in which he stages futuristic fantasies full of imagination". He also directed a conference on exponential art and technologies within the framework of JustMAD. He also was the first Spanish artist to project a digital artwork on the tallest building in the world.

== Writer ==
In addition to being a writer of books related to topics such as economics and business, González Bree is the creator of the science fiction and cyberpunk saga Koji Neon.

== Publications ==
- "An Examination of Drivers of Attitudes and Intention to Use ATMs for Cash Deposits" (2012) DBA Thesis.
- GuíaBurros: Economía de acceso (2018), Editorial EDITATUM. 20
- 100 Conceptos de Innovación Empresarial (2018), Editorial Penguin Random House Grupo Editorial España.
- Creatividad e innovación exponencial (2020), Editorial Penguin Random House Grupo Editorial España.
- Koji Neon. Episodio 1: NeoLud (2020), Editorial Penguin Random House Grupo Editorial España.
- Koji Neon. Episodio 2: Ecdisis (2021), Editorial Penguin Random House Grupo Editorial España.
- Koji Neon. Episodio 3: Apofis (2021), Editorial Caligrama, Lantia Publishing.
