= Namibian Czechs =

Namibian Czechs were a group of children from Namibia who were evacuated to Czechoslovakia during the Namibian War of Independence. Because of the fighting in Namibia, there were dozens of refugee camps where many children grew up or were directly born. The SWAPO liberation movement had the support of Eastern Bloc countries, including Czechoslovakia. The organization petitioned the Czechoslovak government for asylum and education for Namibian children plagued by war, and over 100 children were brought to Czechoslovakia.

== History ==
On 15 November 1985, 56 children arrived at the castle in Bartošovice in the Moravian-Silesian Region. At that time, the castle was adapted to a boarding school. The children had an idyllic childhood full of games, trips, sports and learning not only Czech, which they had learned. In 1989, 63 children came to Slovakia and lived in Považská Bystrica. In November 1989, the communist regime in Czechoslovakia ended and Namibia declared independence four months later. The newly ruling SWAPO movement began to strongly urge the Czechoslovak government to return the children. Prague demanded guarantees that they would be well cared for in Namibia, but came under great pressure. The matter even escalated into a diplomatic row, with the Windhoek government threatening to have Czechoslovakia declared a terrorist state at the United Nations for detaining their citizens. The intercession of Czech families who wanted to adopt children did not help either. The children had to return to their native country in 1991, but without any knowledge of the local cultural environment. The children were traumatized by this, and some of them were scarred for life. The vast majority of the children did not return to the Czech Republic as adults.

The history of Czech Namibians is the subject of a book called 'Namibian Czechs' by Czech anthropologist and Africanist Kateřina Mildnerová, who has been working on the topic for a long time. A documentary film called Černí Češi ("Black Czechs") was subsequently created on the same topic.

== See also ==
- GDR children of Namibia
