= Tom Alweendo =

Namibian businessperson and politician

The Honourable Tom Alweendo
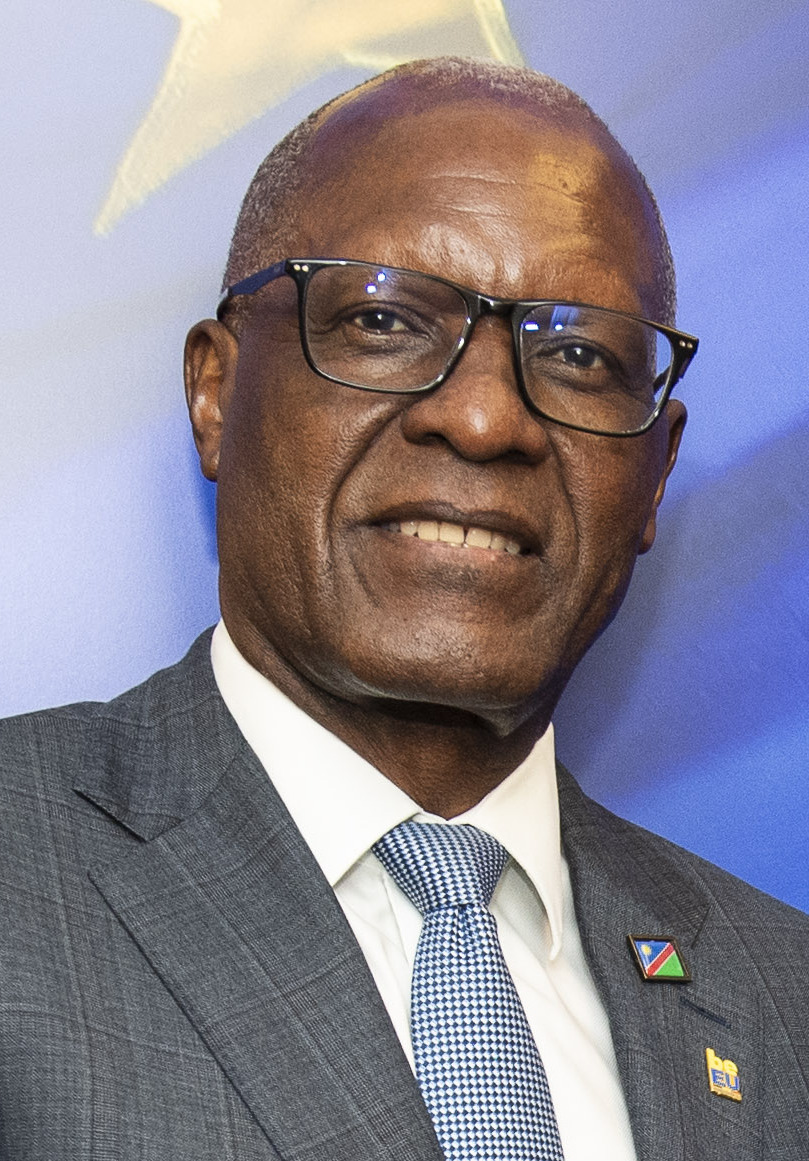
- Tom Alweendo in 2024

Minister of Mines and Energy
- In office 8 February 2018 – 21 March 2025
- President: Hage Geingob
- Prime Minister: Saara Kuugongelwa-Amadhila
- Preceded by: Obeth Kandjoze

Minister in the Presidency in charge of the National Planning Commission
- In office 21 March 2010 – 8 February 2018
- President: Hifikepunye Pohamba; Hage Geingob
- Prime Minister: Hage Geingob; Saara Kuugongelwa-Amadhila
- Preceded by: Helmut Angula
- Succeeded by: Obeth Kandjoze

Governor of the Bank of Namibia
- In office 1 January 1997 – 25 March 2010
- President: Sam Nujoma; Hifikepunye Pohamba
- Prime Minister: Hage Geingob; Theo-Ben Gurirab; Nahas Angula
- Preceded by: Jaafar Ahmad
- Succeeded by: Ipumbu Shiimi

Personal details
- Born: 17 March 1958 (age 68) Omusheshe, Oshana Region, South West Africa (now Namibia)
- Education: University of the Witwatersrand; University of Wales

Thomas Kavaningilamo Alweendo (born 17 March 1958 in Omusheshe, Oshana Region) is a Namibian politician who served as a Minister of Mines and Energy from 8 February 2018 to 21 March 2025. In 1997, he became the first Namibian Governor of the Bank of Namibia when he replaced Jafaar bin Ahmad of Malaysia.

In 2010, Alweendo was appointed to lead the National Planning Commission. When Hage Geingob took office as president in March 2015, he confirmed Alweendo in his position. In a cabinet reshuffle in February 2018, Alweendo became Minister of Mines and Energy, swapping positions with Obeth Kandjoze.

== Education ==
Alweendo earned a bachelor's degree from the University of the Witwatersrand in South Africa and a Master of Business Administration from the University of Wales in the United Kingdom.

As governor of the Bank of Namibia, he maintained the Namibian dollar's linkage with the South African rand. He also raised concerns about increasing amounts of government debt and questioned whether expenditures on education produced better results.
