= Elixabete Perez Gaztelu =

Basque linguist (born 1961)

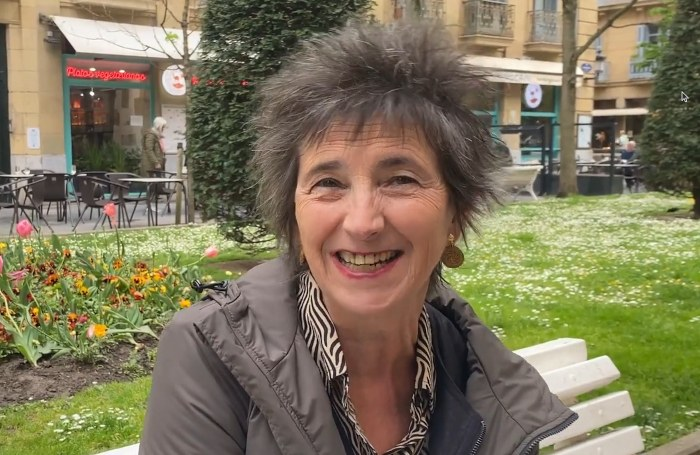
- Professor Perez Gaztelu in 2023
- Born: 18 November 1961 (age 64); Renteria, Gipuzkoa, Basque Country
- Education: University of Deusto
- Occupations: Linguist, professor Research director

Elixabete Perez Gaztelu (born 1961) is a Basque linguist, professor and research director. She holds a doctorate in Basque Philology from the University of Deusto, and is a professor at that university and the director of the Institute of Basque Affairs. The Euskaltzain named her a waterman, a linguistic honor, on 26 May 2006.

== Biography ==
She was born on 18 November 1961, in Renteria, a town located in the province of Gipuzkoa in the Basque Autonomous Community, in the north of Spain.

=== University teacher ===
Perez Gaztelu teaches on two campuses of the University of Deustothe. At the Gipuzkoa campus, she teaches the following subjects in the Communication degree program: Information and Communication Theory I (Basque), Writing and creating messages for the written press (Basque), Oral communication (Basque). She also directs the Final Degree Thesis of the Communication degree. At the Bilbao campus, she teaches Academic Writing.

=== Linguistic researcher ===
Her research topics were initially lexicology and language standardization. In recent years, her group has researched communication and she investigates the use of language in communication, in particular, in the language practices and communications of young Basques in digital environments. She also participates in projects related to gender and communication.

In 1994, she presented her doctoral thesis entitled The direction of Koldo Mitxelena's Basque: pioneers, vocabulary and the analysis of special words in linguistics at the University of Deusto under the direction of Patxi Altuna. The jury consisted of Ibon Sarasola, Patxi Goenaga, Miren Azkarate, Rosa Miren Pagola and Jose Ramon Zubiaur.

In 2019, he also analyzed the works of the Renterian Joxepa Antoni Aranberri in a seminar on oral cultural creation organized jointly by the Mintzola Oral Workshop and the Mikel Laboa Chair of UPV/EHU, with the support of the Basque Society of Sociology and Political Science.

=== Director of the Institute of Basque Affairs ===
Since 2017, she has worked as the director of the Institute of Basque Affairs at the University of Deusto. The institute was founded in 1974 and has collected important bibliographic works on the Basque subject, promoted an important catalog of publications and managed to gather and coordinate an important group of professionals to carry out additional research work. It also organizes many activities, such as conferences, seminars, panel discussions and exhibitions.

The previous directors of the institute were: Ramón Areitio Rodrigo, Andrés Eliseo de Mañaricúa y Nuere (1974-1979), Patxi Altuna Bengoechea (1979-1991, with José Ramón Scheifler Amézaga as deputy director), Rosa Miren Pagola Petrirena (1991-1999), Santiago Larrazabal Basañez (1999-2009) and Nerea Mujika Ulazia (2009-2016).

=== Euskaltzain water officer ===
On 26 May 2006, the Euskaltzaindia (the Royal Academy of the Basque Language) named her a corresponding member, which is a Basque language literary honor. She has worked on the committee of the Consolidation of Lexical Decisions (LEF).

== Selected works ==
She wrote seven books between 2000 and 2010 in the Pathfinder collection published by the Basque Government:

- Of Juan Frantzikos Petria, Xenpelar (1835-1869). Elixabete Perez Gaztelu. (Passengers, 2010)
- Sebastian Manuel Mendiburun (1708-1782). Elixabete Perez Gaztelu. (Passengers, 2008)
- Juan Mari Lekuona : (1927). Elixabete Perez Gaztelu, Ana M. Toledo Lezeta, Esther Zulaika Ijurko. (Passengers, 2005)
- Patxi Altuna : (1927). Elixabete Perez Gaztelu, Ana M. Toledo Lezeta, Esther Zulaika Ijurko. (Passengers, 2005)
- Agustin Kardaberaz. Third Centenary 1703-2003. Elixabete Perez Gaztelu, Esther Zulaika Ijurko. (UD/DU, 2004)
- Luis Jauregi Etxenagusia "Jautarkol": (1896-1971). Elixabete Perez Gaztelu. (Passengers, 2002)
- Luis Villasante Cortabitarte: (1920-2000). Elixabete Perez Gaztelu. (Travellers, 2000)

Selected other books

- Conversations by Joaquin Bermingham: Heresies among the Basques; Patxiku and Mañubel's second conversation; Terexa's kitchen; The two chambers; Pello Mari's attic. Ana M. Toledo Lezeta, Elixabete Perez Gaztelu. (BAUSKALTZAINDIA, 2021)
- Word association/2. Miren Azkarate Villar, Elixabete Perez Gaztelu. (BAUSKALTZAINDIA, 2014)
- Communicate in writing: young people writing at school. Elixabete Perez Gaztelu, Esther Zulaika Ijurko, Ion Muñoa Errasti, Alazne Mujika Alberdi. (UD/DU, 2012)
- Studies in Basque literature (1974-1996): Juan Mari Lekuona. Juan Mari Lekuona Berasategi, Elixabete Perez Gaztelu, Ana M. Toledo Lezeta, Esther Zulaika Ijurko. (UD/DU, 1998)
