= Miren Ortubay Fuentes =

Spanish lawyer and criminologist

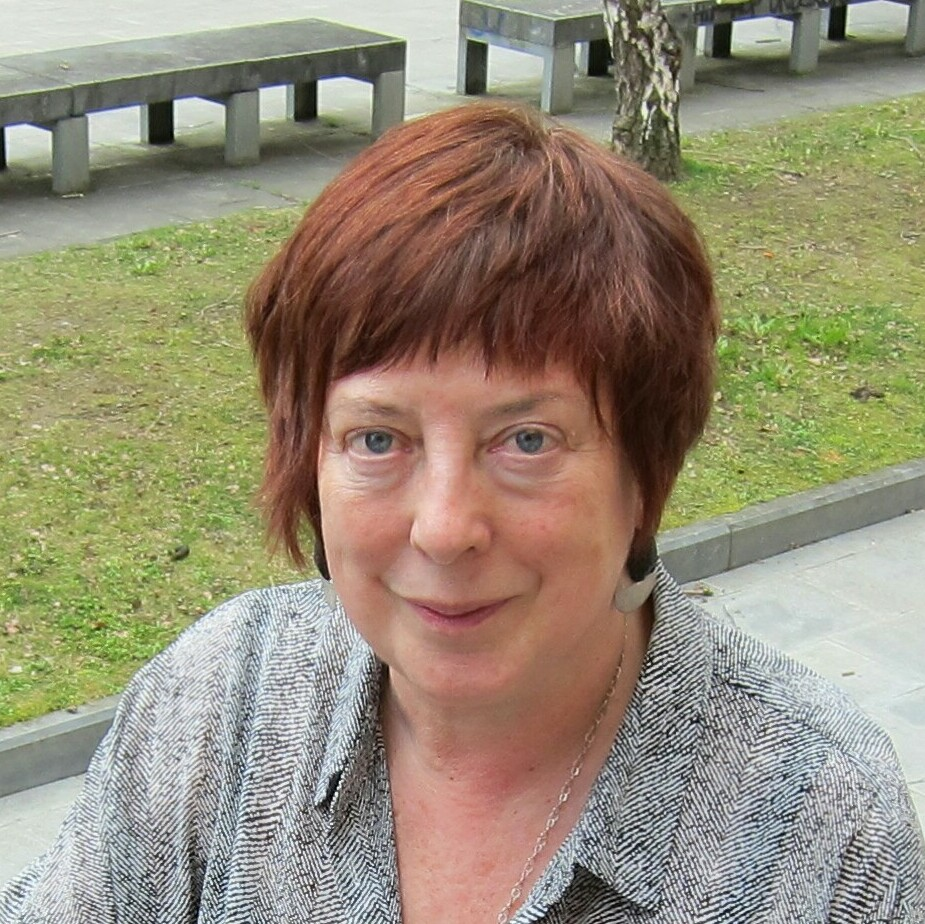
- Miren Ortubay Fuentes (2017)
- Born: 1958 (age 67–68); Vitoria, Spain
- Occupations: Lawyer; criminologist; professor
- Awards: III Menina Basque Country Award (2019)

Academic background
- Education: University of Deusto

Academic work
- Discipline: Law; Criminology
- Sub-discipline: Gender studies; Penology
- Institutions: University of the Basque Country
- Main interests: Gender-related violence; prisoners' rights

Miren Ortubay Fuentes (Vitoria, 1958) is a Spanish lawyer and criminologist, as well as a professor at the University of the Basque Country (UPV/EHU), specializing in gender-related violence and prisoners' rights.

== Biography ==
Ortubay Fuentes graduated in law from the University of Deusto in 1980, and holds a Ph.D. in law from the same university. Her 1994 doctoral thesis was entitled, Relación de trabajo y tutela penal. She holds a diploma in Criminology from the Complutense University of Madrid, and did postgraduate studies in criminology at the university of Louvain-la-Neuve (Belgium).

After completing her education, Ortubay Fuentes began her career as a lawyer. In 1982, she was the co-founder of Salaketa, the association of support to prisoners, located in Vitoria. From 1995 to 2006, she was legal advisor to the Ararteko (Ombudsman of the Basque Country) being responsible for the areas of Justice and Equality of women and men.

Ortubay Fuentes is a full professor at UPV/EHU in the Faculty of Law and the Faculty of Social Work. She teaches, among others, the subject Violence against Women: Prevention and Intervention.

She is a member of the Fórum Feminista María de Maeztu and collaborates with groups such as Otras Voces Feministas and the Organización no gubernamental para el desarrollo (ONGD) Asociación por los Derechos Humanos en Afganistán (ASDHA). Ortubay Fuentes is a member of the Board of Trustees of the Fernando Buesa Blanco Foundation.

Ortubay Fuentes, Lohitzune Zuloaga, and Estíbaliz de Miguel have participated together in the Instituto Vasco de la Mujer study Experiencia de la detención policial de las mujeres de la Comunidad Autónoma del País Vasco (Experience of Police Detention of Women in the Autonomous Community of the Basque Country).

== Awards and honours ==
- 2019, III Menina Basque Country Awards to people committed to the eradication of gender-based violence in its various manifestations

== Selected works ==
- Tutela penal de las condiciones de trabajo : un estudio del artículo 311 del Código penal, 2000 ISBN 9788483732588 OCLC 1010644234
- Prisión y alternativas en el nuevo Código Penal tras la reforma 2015, 2016 ISBN 9788491480150 OCLC 1013183563
- “Ten Years of the “Comprehensive Law against Gender Violence”: Lights and Shadows”, in Revista Ventana Jurídica, Judicial Training School, El Salvador, 2015
