= Maureen Hinda-Mbuende =

Namibian politician (born 1964)

The Honorable Maureen Hinda-Mbuende

Deputy minister of Finance and Public Enterprises
- In office April 2021 – 21 March 2025
- President: Nangolo Mbumba; Hage Geingob

Deputy minister of Home Affairs, Immigration and Safety and Security
- In office February 2018 – March 2021
- President: Hage Geingob

Deputy minister of International Relations and Cooperation
- In office March 2015 – February 2018
- President: Hage Geingob

Personal details
- Born: September 9, 1964 (age 61)
- Party: Swapo Party of Namibia
- Spouse: Kaire Mbuende
- Occupation: Politician

Maureen Magreth Hinda-Mbuende (born 9 September 1964) was a Namibian legislator in the National Assembly and a politician who served as a deputy minister of Finance and Public Enterprises.

== Early life and education ==
Hinda was born on 9 September 1964 in Tses, South West Africa (today in the ǁKaras Region of Namibia). She matriculated at Suiderlig High School in 1983 and completed her B.Com. Hons in business administration at the University of the Western Cape in 2002. In 1990 Hinda worked as school teacher at Fredrick Awaseb School. She later served at UN Volunteers as an administration assistant for finance. From 1994 to 1996 she worked as an internal audit clerk at City Savings and Investment Bank. She had been a regional manager at Namibia Housing Enterprise (NHE) in 2002–2009. Hinda-Mbuende left NHE in 2009 to become a managing director at the South Cross HCM Center before she was appointed to be a deputy minister in 2015.

== Political career ==
Hinda-Mbuende has been a member of the National Assembly since 2015. In March 2015 Hinda-Mbuende was first appointed by President Hage Geingob as a deputy minister of International Relations and Cooperation. In a February 2018 cabinet reshuffle she was moved to the Minister of Home Affairs, Immigration and Safety and Security, again as deputy minister. She served until March 2021. On 21 April 2021 Hinda-Mbuende was again appointed as deputy minister, this time with the Finance and Public Enterprises portfolio.

== Family ==
Hinda-Mbuende is married to fellow politician and diplomat Kaire Mbuende. They have six children.
