= Kingston Business School =

- Established: 1992, and replaced the College of Polytechnic (established 1970)
- Head of School: Professor Sankar Sivarajah
- Students: 4,424
- Location: London, United Kingdom
- Affiliations: AACSB, Association of MBAs, EFMD, Economic and Social Research Council
- Website: Kingston Business School

Kingston Business School is a business school located in London, United Kingdom and a part of Kingston University. It holds AACSB, AMBA, and EFMD EPAS accreditation

== History ==
Kingston Business School origins date to the 1960s. It is now part of the Faculty of Business and Social Sciences at Kingston University.

== Location ==
Kingston University Business School is based in Kingston upon Thames on the border of London and Surrey.

== Campus ==
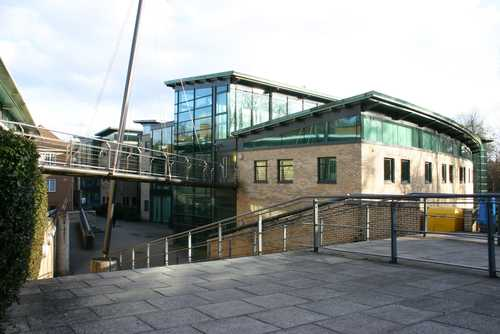
Kingston Business school located in Kingston hill campus of Kingston University

The Business School is situated on the Kingston Hill campus, one of four campuses of the university, in the London borough of Kingston upon Thames. In April 2012 it moved into a new purpose-built building on the site. The campus is within walking distance of Richmond Park. A free and frequent student bus services operates between campuses and Kingston town centre during term time.

== Organisation and academic profile ==
The school is divided into three academic departments: the Department of Accounting, Finance and Informatics, the Department of Management, and the Department of Strategy, Marketing & Innovation. They offer undergraduate, taught postgraduate and doctoral programmes.

The Business School works in partnership with academic institutions in Germany and India to deliver Kingston University degree programmes such as the Masters in Business Administration (MBA), International Business, International HR Management programme and Business Administration.

=== Accreditation ===
The Business School has accreditation from the Association to Advance Collegiate Schools of Business (AACSB) and the Association of MBAs (AMBA) for its MBA. The European Foundation for Management Development (EFMD) has awarded Kingston Business School EPAS accreditation for three sets of programmes.

Business School holds professional body accreditations ACT, ACCA, BPS, CIM, CIMA, CIPD, CIPR, CIPS, ICAEW, RICS for its programmes.

== Research ==
The Business School has five knowledge hubs covering small business research, responsible innovation, sustainability and entrepreneurship; accountability, governance and the capital market; customer insights and value; foresight, creativity, and decision-making; and the future of work and organisations.

Kingston Business School is a founding member of European Doctoral Programmes Association in Management and Business Administration (EDAMBA) and European Doctoral School on Knowledge and Management (EUDOKMA).

== Rankings ==
Business School Rankings
Worldwide overall
QS	351–400
Eduniversal	3 Palmes
Times Higher Education	301–400
MBA Rankings
QS Global MBA	131–140
QS MBA Europe	40

== Student life ==
The Kingston Hill Campus is located approximately 3 miles from Kingston Town Centre and close to Richmond Park and Wimbledon Common, and is approximately 25 minutes from central London. The Campus has study facilities for students which include Meeting pods, designated Study rooms, numerous Computer Labs, a Learning Cafe and a Learning Resources Centre; formally known as the Nightingale Centre. As part of Kingston University, the Business School has one of the most ethnically diverse student populations in the UK.

Also located on the Campus is a Halls of Residence to accommodate 565 students, Music Studio, Café, Restaurant and Bar. Sports and fitness activities at Kingston Hill include football, table tennis, golf and badminton. In addition, the university also has its own sports clubs and teams which are run by the Kingston University Student Union (KUSU).

== Notable alumni ==
- Tony Ball, marketer, former Chief Executive of BSkyB
- Ed McKeever, Olympic Gold Medallist in kayaking
- Francisco González Bree, professor, author and artist
