= University of Deusto =

Spanish private university

Coordinates: 43°16′15″N 2°56′15″W

- Universidad de Deusto; Deustuko Unibertsitatea
- Motto: Sapientia melior auro
- Motto in English: Wisdom is better than gold
- Type: Private Roman Catholic Research Non-profit Coeducational Higher education institution
- Established: 1886; 140 years ago
- Religious affiliation: Roman Catholic (Jesuit)
- Academic affiliations: Compostela Group of Universities
- Endowment: €48,114,754
- Chancellor: Rev. Fr. Arturo Sosa, SJ
- Vice-Chancellor: Fr. Enric Puigross Llavinés, SJ
- Rector: Fr. Juan José Etxeberria Sagastume, SJ
- Faculty: 660 in 2019
- Students: Undergraduate: 9,348; Graduate: 2,973 in 2018-2019
- Location: Bilbao Biscay and San Sebastián, Spain
- Colors: Blue
- Website: www.deusto.es

The University of Deusto (Spanish: Universidad de Deusto; Basque: Deustuko Unibertsitatea) is a Spanish private university owned by the Society of Jesus, with campuses in Bilbao and San Sebastián, and the Deusto Business School branch in Madrid. The University of Deusto is the oldest private university in Spain.

== History ==
=== Origins ===
The University of Deusto first opened in 1886, having been founded because of the Basque Country's desire to have its own university and the Society of Jesus's wish to move its School of Higher Studies in Laguardia to a more central place. To that effect a huge building was designed by architect Francisco de Cubas, which was the largest building in Bilbao at the time. Now it is the main building of the Bilbao campus, opposite to the Guggenheim Museum, in the district of Deusto, which gives its name to the university. The Universidad Comercial (Business College), founded in 1916, was the first business school in Spain, and the only one for nearly 50 years.

=== Civil War and postwar ===
The advent of the Second Spanish Republic (1931) interrupted and altered university life at Deusto. On 23 January 1932, the Spanish government dissolved the Society of Jesus by decree, and the university, owned by the Jesuits, was closed down. Some lectures still continued at the "Academia Vizcaína de Cultura", and the "Universidad Comercial" (Faculty of Economics) could carry on work as normal until the beginning of the Spanish Civil War. During the war, the University of Deusto became a military base, but after the fall of Bilbao in 1937 it was turned into a hospital, food supply centre, and concentration camp. It resumed classes in October 1940.

=== Official recognition ===
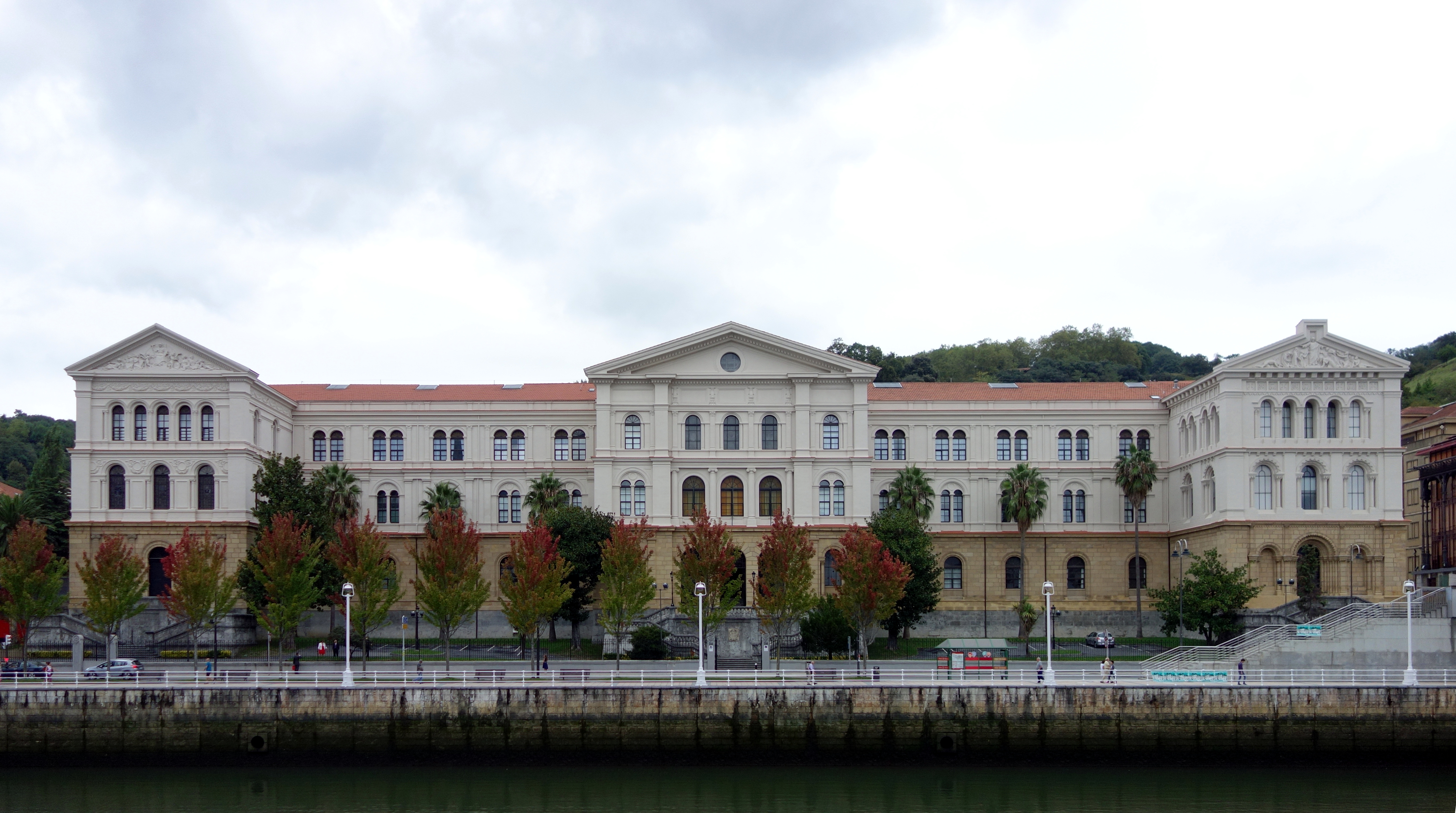
Main building of the University of Deusto, Bilbao

In 1962 the university was very well known throughout Basque country and all of Spain, and its former students excelled in the worlds of business, politics, and culture. However, they had a drawback: their studies were not officially recognized by the State and they had to sit an examination at a State University. Society did not really take this circumstance into account, but action was taken so that official recognition was granted. On 5 April 1962, an agreement was signed between the Spanish Government and the Holy See that provided Catholic or Church Universities with a legal basis. On 10 August 1963, the University of Deusto received canonical approval by the Holy See. In September of that year it was recognized by the State, including its Faculties of Law and Philosophy and Arts (Modern Philology division). Since then, the number of students and centres has been increasing rapidly, first from 500 to 1,000 students, and to 2,700 five years later; ten years later there were 5,000 and at present it has reached 14,000 students. The rest of the faculties were successively recognized beginning with the Faculty of Economic and Business Sciences in 1973 and finishing with that of Computing Sciences in 1979 (which later became the Faculty of Engineering). University of Deusto is part of the Aristos Campus Mundus 2015 (ACM 2015) project as well.

=== San Sebastián campus ===
Its origin was ESSA in 1956. ESSA was the main body that started to teach these studies and assumed the ownership of future ESTE. In the beginning, Business Management, Law, Economic Sciences and Engineering Preparatory Courses were taught. The Society of Jesus was entrusted with its running and management. In 1960 this body was named EUG, and in 1963 the first stone of EUTG, University and Technical Studies of Guipúzcoa was laid. During 1979, the Faculty of Economic and Business Studies-ESTE became a faculty dependent on UD and in 1990, the legal and real union of the San Sebastian centre took place as a second campus of the University of Deusto. ESTE in San Sebastián and La Comercial in Bilbao merged into Deusto Business School in 2009. Nowadays, Deusto Business School, the Faculty of Psychology and Education, and the Faculty of Social and Human Sciences are present in the San Sebastián campus.

== Schools and colleges ==
University of Deusto is composed of seven schools and colleges:

- Deusto Law School
- Deusto Business School
- Faculty of Theology
- Faculty of Engineering
- Faculty of Education and Sport
- Faculty of Social and Human Sciences
- Faculty of Health Sciences

University of Deusto also collaborates with Bizkaia Talent, the associative project of the Foral Government of Biscay to promote research, creation, innovation and knowledge in the historical territory of Biscay. In addition, Orkestra-Basque Institute of Competitiveness- is an initiative of the University of Deusto, through the Deusto Foundation, for the study of competitiveness and regional development.

== International rankings ==
University rankings

Global – Overall
- THE World: 601-801 (2022)

According to the 2019 Times Higher Education World University Ranking, the University of Deusto is internationally ranked between 601 and 800, with their 2019 University Impact Ranking between 101–200 and their 2019 European Teaching Rankings between 126 and 150. The QS World University Rankings of 2019 ranked the Deusto School of Law globally between 251 and 300.

== Notable alumni and faculty ==
=== Alumni ===
- Roberto Urdaneta Arbeláez, President of Colombia
- José Antonio Aguirre, President of the Basque Government 1936-1960 (in exile from 1937)
- Joaquín Almunia, former Secretary General of the Spanish Socialist Workers' Party and current European Commissioner for Competition
- Gurutzi Arregi (1936–2020), ethnographer
- Esteban de Bilbao Eguía, graduate in Philosophy & Letters, Cortes speaker, 1943–1965
- Ana Blanco, journalist and newscaster
- Emilio Botín, banker
- Gerardo Diego, Spanish poet and member of Generation of 27
- Espido Freire, writer
- José García-Margallo y Marfil, Spanish politician and Minister of Foreign Affairs and Cooperation
- Alex de la Iglesia, film director, graduate in philosophy
- Antonio Iturmendi Bañales, graduate in Law, Minister of Justice (1951–1965) and Cortes speaker (1965–1969)
- Pedro Morenés, Minister of Defence of Spain
- Jose Manuel Albares Bueno, Diplomat, Ambassador of Spain to France and Minister of Foreign Affairs, European Union and Cooperation of Spain
- Miren Ortubay Fuentes (born 1958), lawyer, criminologist, professor
- Elixabete Perez Gaztelu (born 1961), Basque linguist, professor
- Marina Sáenz (born 1970), Spanish jurist, University professor of Commercial Law at the University of Valladolid and LGBT activist

=== Faculty ===
- Xabier Arzalluz, former Jesuit, Basque nationalist politician, professor of law
- Andrés Ortíz-Osés, philosopher
- Francisco González Bree, professor at Deusto Business School

== See also ==
- List of Jesuit sites
