= GDR Children of Namibia =

Namibian children raised in East Germany

GDR children of Namibia (German: DDR-Kinder von Namibia) is a colloquial term denoting black Namibian children that were raised in East Germany, also known as the German Democratic Republic (GDR). During the South African Border War, the children of hundreds of Namibian refugees and political exiles were resettled and educated in the GDR from 1979 onwards. They were repatriated upon German reunification and their native country's formal independence from South Africa in 1990.

== History ==
During the South African Border War, SWAPO solicited material assistance from around the globe, which they got in the form of education, health, arms and funds. Between 1960 and 1980 hundreds of Namibians came to GDR and were offered academic education. In 1978 many wounded SWAPO guerrillas came from Cassinga to GDR for medical treatment. The GDR offered what was termed "Solidarity Consignment“ to South West Africans. Sam Nujoma turned again to the GDR and other socialist countries after the Cassinga massacre and asked again for children to be taken out of the SWAPO refugee camps for safety, support, and care.

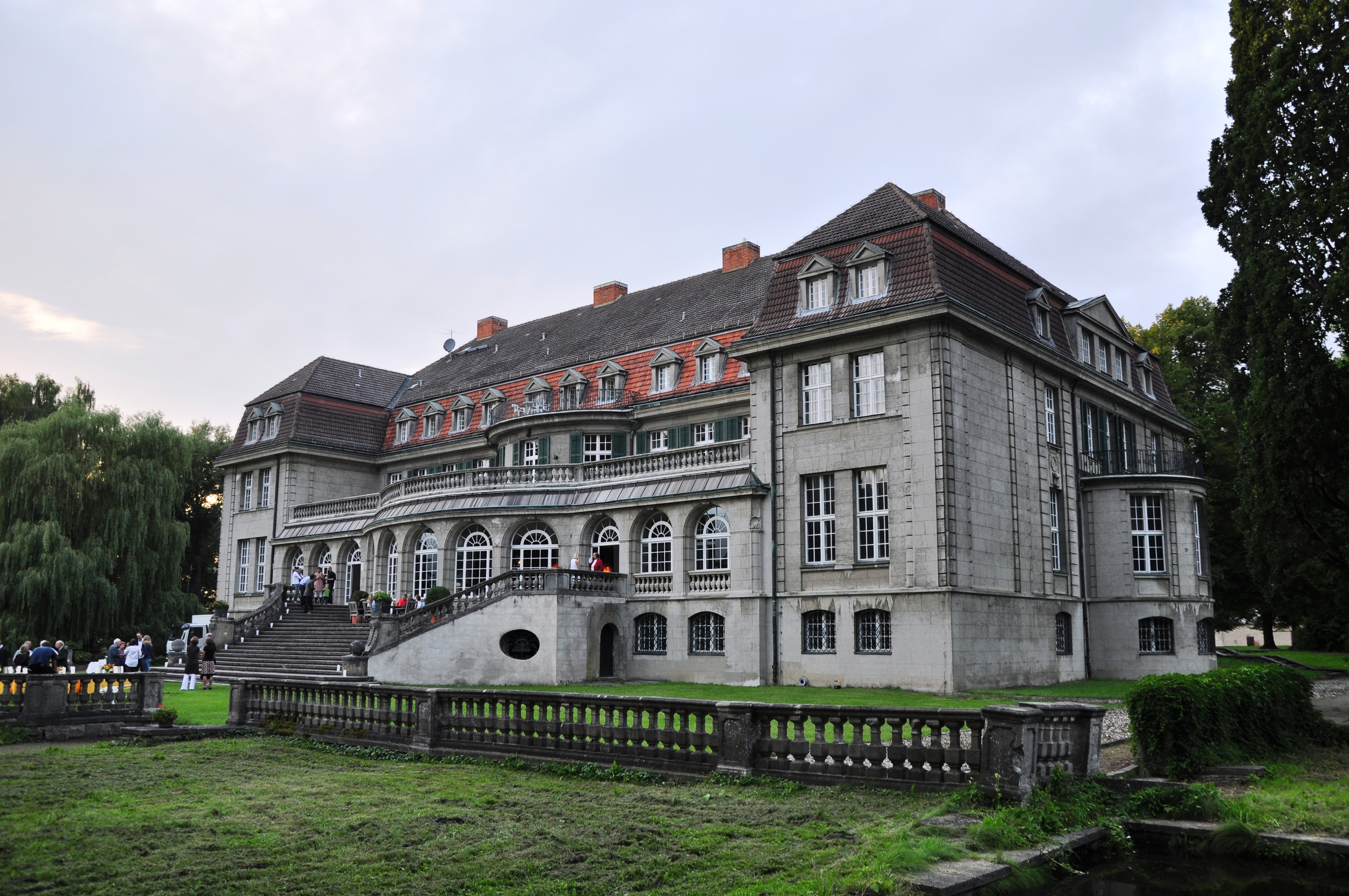
Bellin Castle

On 12 September 1979 Nujoma's request was granted by the SED's Central committee. Jagdschloss Bellin, a hunting castle in Bellin, a village ten kilometers south of Güstrow (today in Mecklenburg-Vorpommern) was identified as a safe home for the children.

== Arrival ==
On 18 December 1979 the first group of about 80 children arrived in the snowy winter in Bellin. Some were between the ages of 3 and 5 years old. Besides medical and general support it was agreed that German should be the medium of instruction for those in pre-primary and primary school. Between 1979 and 1988 a total of 430 black children came to the GDR. Due to inadequate space, the groups from 1979 to 1985 were moved to the School of Friendship in Staßfurt.

The children were mostly pre-school war orphans. Some of them were selected from families of SWAPO functionaries, reportedly without the consent or consultation of their family members. The government of GDR saw the education of these children as one of their contributions to the international revolution.

The first group of children that went in 1979, and were called later the "79ers," spent eleven and a half years in the GDR. They went to school, learned German as a mother tongue, and basically grew up with a German lifestyle. German and Namibian teachers tried their best to sustain the Namibian culture with the teaching of traditional dances, Oshivambo songs, and traditional cooking. In the GDR, social and tertiary education was of utmost importance for the children. The education for the SWAPO Pionier aimed to place most of these youths in elite leadership positions for the development of the country once Namibia achieved its independence.

== Repatriation ==
A few months after the fall of the Berlin Wall in November 1989, Namibia attained its independence. The event culminated in the repatriation of Namibian children and teachers from the GDR back to Namibia.

There are a number of theories regarding the unexpected repatriation; at that point, an established parent committee requested the return of these children, as a symbol for a new Namibian government and to nullify the rumours that the SWAPO children were kidnapped. The repatriation of these children took place from 26 to 31 August 1990, landing in a homeland alien to them. The consequence was cultural shock: Though these youth were seen by the Namibian people as Germans, the Namibian German people regarded them to be "amazingly German“, though as black people.

For the GDR children of Namibia, it meant a conflict between two home countries and two cultures, and a fight for two identities. Many of them returned into poverty and struggle instead of achieving the expected leadership positions.

== Aftermath ==
In the process of the children's homecoming to Namibia, the concept "ex-GDR children" was casually used along with the term "Ossis of Namibia“, as they sometimes regarded themselves as "Ossis". The Ossiclub of Windhoek that existed up to 2007 was a place where they regularly met. Up to today, the concept of "GDR children" is a meaning that continues to have significance. As some of them went to good schools in Namibia and still have a good command of the German language in a country with a strong German influence, they stand to have good career opportunities. Unfortunately some still experience difficulties in the search for their own sense of home, culture, and identity.

Today most of the ex-GDR children describe themselves as "Omulaule", a word in Oshivambo that means "black" or "black man". They call their everyday language Oshi-Deutsch, a mixture of German and Oshivambo. Their organization continues to operate under the name Freundeskreis ex-DDR, but it is currently largely dormant.

== Current Situation ==
Since end of 2009 a group of Omulaule came under the spotlight through bad behaviour especially in Windhoek. They started collecting money in the form of donations for an apparent historical expedition from German tourists. Such expedition or project was never planned.

== Exhibition ==
In the temporary exhibition "Ansichtssache(n) : The German in me is Indirect" at the Humboldt Forum / Ethnological Museum in Berlin traces the history of the "GDR children". In photo collages and video interviews, some of them and their children look at their biographies, in which African and European perspectives intersect in many ways. Exhibition concept: Dirk Neldner. Opening Sep. 2021.

== In the arts ==
=== Films ===
- Omulaule means black, from the Bauhaus-Universität Weimar (Fakultät Medien) developed a documentary film . They got a prize for the Landeszentrale for political Education Thüringen, in 2003. Webseite zum Film
- The Ossis from Windhoek, 1997 Documentation, 52 min. ARTE & Mdr
- Documentaryfilm-Zyklus von Lilly Grote & Julia Kunert:
  - Inside – Outside, Staßfurt, 1990 Staßfurt – Windhoek
  - Oshilongo Shange – My Land, 1992
- The Ossis from Namibia, Documentary film from K.-D. Gralow, R. Pitann and H. Thull., 2004–2007, Production: Pitann Film+Grafic, First screening NDR 2007

=== Plays ===
- Oshi-Deutsch - The GDR Kids of Namibia / Oshi-Deutsch - die DDR-Kinder von Namibia Namibian-German coproduction, Theater Osnabrück, 2016

=== Literature ===
- Marco Mahler: Kuckucksland, Tinte & Feder, 2016, ISBN 978-1503941953
- Stefanie-Lahya Aukongo: God's Child. How the GDR changed my life. Rowohlt Taschenbuch Verlag, Reinbek 2009, ISBN 3-499-62500-8, (Rororo 62500 Sachbuch).
- Lucia Engombe, Peter Hilliges: Child Nr. 95. My German-African Odyssee. Ullstein, Berlin 2004, ISBN 3-548-25892-1, (Ullstein-Taschenbuch 25892).
- Constance Kenna (Hrsg.): The „GDR-Children“ of Namibia. Homecomers in an unknown country. Klaus Hess Verlag, Göttingen / Windhoek 1999, ISBN 3-933117-11-9.
- Jürgen Krause: „The GDR-Namibia-Solidarityprojekt School of Friendship – Possibilities and limitation intercultural Education“. BIS-Verlag, Universität Oldenburg 2009, ISBN 978-3-8142-2176-2.
- Uta Rüchel: „We had seen a black person“. The integration of Germans and Namibian around the SWAPO-Childrenhome Bellin 1979 - 1990. Published from the Landesbeauftragten for Mecklenburg-Vorpommern for materials of the safety and security of the GDR. Landesbeauftragter for Mecklenburg-Vorpommern for materials of the safety and security of the GDR, Schwerin 2001, ISBN 3-933255-11-2.
- Ingrid Brase Schloe, Kay Brase: Onesmus. White Children with a black skin in Namibia. Betzel Verlag, Nienburg 1996, ISBN 3-929017-74-1.

== See also ==
- Namibian Czechs
