= Bank of Namibia =

Monetary authority of Namibia

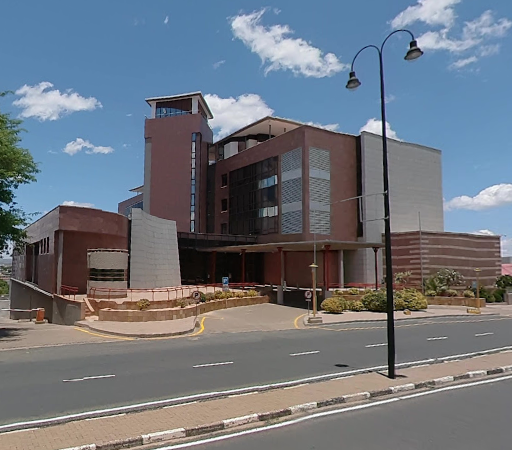
- Headquarters: Windhoek, Khomas Region, Namibia
- Established: 9 July 1990; 35 years ago
- Ownership: 100% state ownership
- Governor: Ebson Uanguta
- Central bank of: Namibia
- Currency: Namibian dollar NAD (ISO 4217)
- Reserves: 1 680 million USD
- Bank rate: 4.25%
- Preceded by: South African Reserve Bank
- Website: www.bon.com.na

The Bank of Namibia (BoN) is the central bank of Namibia, whose establishment is enshrined in Article 128 of the Namibian Constitution. It is located in the capital city of Windhoek. The Bank of Namibia was established in 1990 by the Bank of Namibia Act, 1990 (Act 8 of 1990). The Bank of Namibia is the only institution that is permitted to issue the Namibian dollar by authority that has been given to it under an Act of the Namibian Parliament. The head of the Bank of Namibia is the Governor of the Bank of Namibia.

== Governors ==
The Governors to date have been:

- Wouter Benard (16 June 1990 - 31 August 1991)
- Erik Lennart Karlsson (1 September 1991 - 31 December 1993)
- Jaafar bin Ahmad (1 January 1994 - 31 December 1996)
- Tom Alweendo (1 January 1997 - 25 March 2010)
- Ipumbu Shiimi (25 March 2010 - 1 June 2020)
- Johannes !Gawaxab (1 June 2020 - 31 December 2025)
- Ebson Uanguta (1 January 2026 - present)

The Bank is engaged in policies to promote financial inclusion and is a member of the Alliance for Financial Inclusion. On March 5, 2012, the Bank of Namibia announced it would be making specific commitments to financial inclusion under the Maya Declaration.

In May 2024, Bank of Namibia and NPCI International Payments Ltd. (NIPL), the international arm of India's National Payments Corporation of India (NPCI) collaborated on Instant Payment System Implementation inspired by India's Unified Payment Interface (UPI).

== See also ==
- Namibian dollar
- Economy of Namibia
- List of central banks of Africa
- List of central banks
