= Bizkaia Talent =

Government agency in Biscay, Spain

- Bizkaia Talent
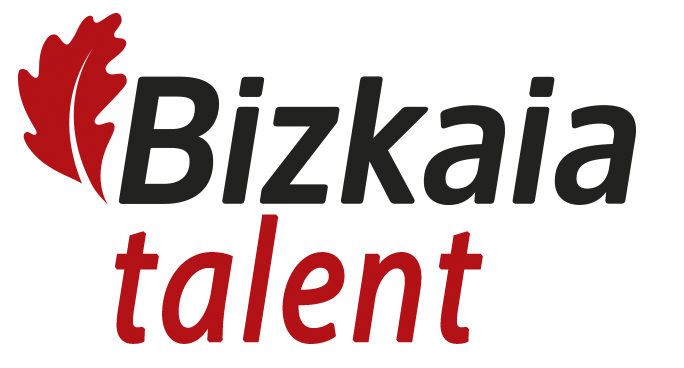

Government agency overview
- Formed: 2005; 21 years ago
- Preceding government agency: Bizkaia:xede
- Type: Independent agency
- Jurisdiction: Biscay, Spain
- Headquarters: Bizkaia Science and Technology Park; Biscay, Spain
- Annual budget: €1,4 m euro (2020)
- Government agency executive: Ivan Jiménez Aira
- Parent department: Department of Economic Promotion (Foral Government of Biscay)
- Website: www.bizkaiatalent.eus

Bizkaia Talent is a Spanish public body, attached to the Department of Economic Promotion of the Foral Government of Biscay, established as a talent recruitment agency, with the aim of attracting, linking and retaining highly qualified people in the innovation and knowledge process. It is a talent recruitment agency, and its field of work is the talent management.

Bizkaia Talent has been recognized by international media such as the BBC.

The current director of the agency is Ivan Jiménez Aira, since 2011. Previously, the director of the agency was Imanol Pradales (2007-2011).

== History ==
The Lisbon Strategy set the goal of making Europe the most competitive geographical area in the world, a competitiveness based on knowledge and innovation and a competitiveness that must materialize in greater levels of social cohesion and solidarity. With the aim of positioning the province of Biscay among the regions that join the objectives defined by the Lisbon strategy, the first project called Bizkaia Xede was carried out, whose mission was to create the necessary conditions to attract, retain and link capital human in the process of innovation and advanced knowledge.

Later and promoted by the Department of Economic Promotion of the Foral Government of Biscay, Bizkaia Talent was established in 2005 as an initiative of associative non-profit and with a clear mission, to promote and favor the establishment in Biscay and in the Basque Country in general, of the conditions necessary to attract, link and retain human capital in the process of innovation and knowledge. For this reason, and to carry out that goal of attracting talent, collaboration is available of companies and universities in the Basque Country.

BBC World News highlighted this work for attracting, retaining and linking talent promoted by Bizkaia Talent.

== Talentia Service ==
The Talentia Service is aimed at university students and has the following programs: Talentia Programme, Competences for Professionalism in Bizkaia (Talentia Skills), Talentia Challenge and Be Basque Ambassadors. It is a service whose main ingredient is collaboration between industry and the academic world, investing in the development of Basque university talent.

=== Talentia Programme ===
The Talentia Programme of Bizkaia Talent is a program that wants to recognize and reward students with the best university academic result and trajectory (in each university bachelor's degree).

The programme is promoted by Bizkaia Talent jointly with the University of Deusto, the University of the Basque Country and the University of Mondragon, and it is targeted at the students who living in Biscay have the best university academic result and trajectory at the three Basque universities, giving advice and support for insertion in the labour market, career development and engagement with the scientific, technological and business reality around them. Talentia is targeted at undergraduate seniors with an excellent academic record and other skills identified and evaluated by university authorities. Students for the program are selected among those who are in the last year of their degree (and have an excellent academic record).

Talentia Programme wants to recognize and reward students with the best university academic result and trajectory (in each university bachelor's degree) at the University of Deusto, the University of the Basque Country and the University of Mondragon.

The Talentia Program lasts for 6 months (from December to May or June, in general). In June the graduation ceremony and the delivery of the diplomas take place.

== Talentia Network ==
The Talentia Network (Red Talentia, in Spanish) is a group of professionals selected by Bizkaia Talent and who have participated in the Talentia Program. The participants of the Talentia Program become part of the Talentia Network, along with all the other participants from previous editions.

In 2019 the Network had 1,500 members. As of December 31, 2021, the network had 2,100 members.

== See also ==
- Honours
- Bachelor's Degree Extraordinary Award
- Valedictorian
- Class rank
- Latin honors
