= Basque Museum =

Coordinates: 43.2580°N 2.9219°W

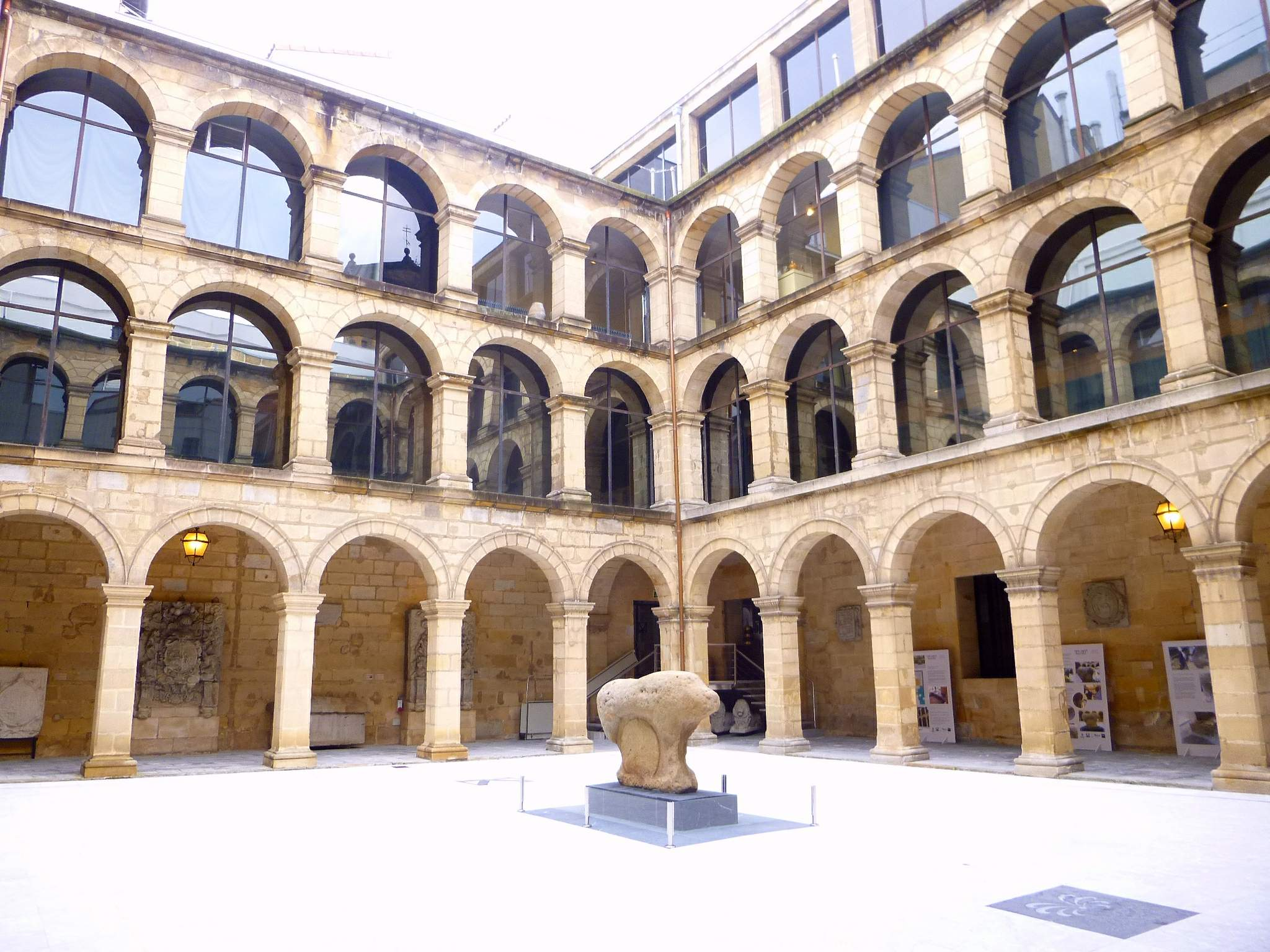

General information
- Type: Culture and leisure
- Location: Bilbao, Spain
- Completed: 1921

Technical details
- Structural system: Steel superstructure with reinforced concrete floors

The Basque Museum, with the original name of the Basque Archaeological, Ethnographic and Historical Museum, is a museum in Bilbao, Spain. It opened its doors in 1921, occupying the ground floor of the baroque cloister of the old Colegio de San Andrés, which belonged to the Jesuits until their expulsion from Spain in 1767; the adjacent church of Santos Juanes, today a regular worship parish, is the church that once belonged to the Jesuit college. From the beginning it had the sponsorship of the Vizcaya Provincial Council and the Bilbao City Council. Little by little, the museum was occupying the annex buildings and increasing its collections, which include the archeology of Vizcaya and the ethnohistory of the Basque Country. The museum is currently undergoing a renovation process both at the museological and museum levels. Since 1962 it has been an Asset of Cultural Interest (BIC), with the category of National Historic-Artistic Monument.
