= National Planning Commission of Namibia =

The National Planning Commission of Namibia is an agency of the Namibian government responsible for planning national priorities and directing the course of national development. The commission is chaired by a Director-General, and includes the Ministers of Agriculture, Water and Forestry, Finance, Trade and Industry, Works and Transport, Regional and Local Government, and Housing and Rural Development, plus eight other people with knowledge and experience of development in economic, social, ecological or other related fields.

Directors General have included Saara Kuugongelwa, appointed in 1995 and Helmut Angula, appointed in 2005. As of 19 March 2015, Tom Alweendo was Minister in Presidency in charge of the National Planning Commission and also Deputy Minister of Environment and Tourism.
