= Namibian dollar =

Currency of Namibia

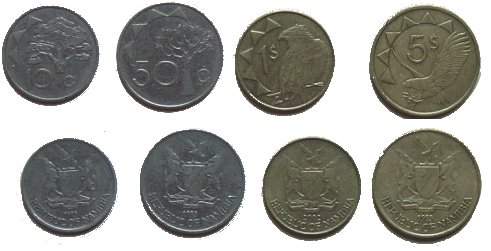
- 10 cents, 50 cents, N$1, N$5

ISO 4217
- Code: NAD (numeric: 516)
- Subunit: 0.01

Units of account
- Symbol: $, N$
- Subunit
- 1/100: cent
- Symbol
- cent: c

Denominations
- Banknotes: N$10, N$20, N$30, N$50, N$60, N$100, N$200
- Coins: 5c, 10c, 20c, 50c, N$1, N$5, N$10

Demographics
- Date of introduction: 15 September 1993
- User(s): Namibia (alongside South African rand at a ratio of 1 Dollar to 1 Rand at par)

Issuance
- Central bank: Bank of Namibia
- Website: www.bon.com.na

Valuation
- Inflation: 6.8%
- Source: The World Factbook, 2016 est.
- Pegged with: South African rand at par

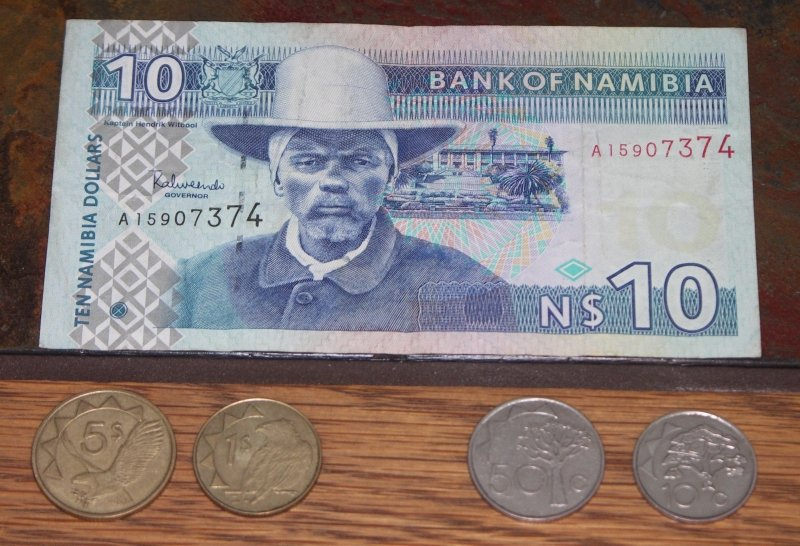
Old N$10 banknote and coins

The Namibian dollar (symbol: $ or N$; code: NAD) has been the currency of Namibia since 1993. It is normally abbreviated with the dollar sign ($), or alternatively N$ to distinguish it from other currencies called “dollar.” It is divided into 100 cents.

== History ==
The dollar replaced the South African rand, which had been the country's currency while it was under South African rule as South-West Africa from 1920 until 1990, at par. The rand is still legal tender, as the Namibian dollar is linked to the South African rand and can be exchanged on a one-to-one basis locally. Namibia was also part of the Common Monetary Area from independence in 1990 until the introduction of the dollar in 1993.

In the beginning, alternative names for the Namibian dollar were suggested, including Namibian kalahar, referencing the Kalahari Desert in the east of Namibia, but ultimately the government settled on the name Namibian dollar. The first notes were issued on 15 September 1993.

The Bank of Namibia issued the first banknotes on 15 September 1993 and, in December, issued the first national coins.

== Coins ==
Coins in circulation

denomination:	obverse:	reverse:
5c		
10c		
50c		
N$1		
N$5		

Years of mintage are 1993, 1996, 1998, 2000, 2002, 2008, 2009, 2010, 2012, 2015. The cent coins are made of nickel plated steel and the dollar coins of brass. From January 2019, 5c coins are no longer produced, but they are still used for daily transactions.

== Banknotes ==
The following banknotes are currently in circulation:

- N$10
- N$20
- N$30 (commemorative)
- N$50
- N$60 (commemorative)
- N$100
- N$200

Historically, Kaptein Hendrik Witbooi, once chief of the Nama people and instrumental in leading the revolts against German rule at the turn of the 20th century, has been depicted on all Namibian banknotes. However, on 21 March 2012, the Bank of Namibia introduced a new series of banknotes to be issued in May 2012. The new family of banknotes will have the same denomination structure as the current series. All denominations have improved anti-counterfeiting features, and the portrait of Kaptein Hendrik Witbooi is retained for all but the 10 and 20 dollar notes, which feature a new portrait of Sam Nujoma, the founding president and father of the Namibian nation.

The Bank of Namibia has discovered that the diamond-shaped optically variable ink patch on the N$10 and N$20 notes was cracking after multiple folding and handling. The Bank of Namibia has recently issued in limited quantity, the N$10 and N$20 notes on paper with improved quality and shifted the placement of the diamond-shaped optically variable ink feature.

On 21 March 2020, the Bank of Namibia unveiled a new 30 dollar polymer note to commemorate the 30th anniversary of independence. The theme of the note is '3 Decades of Peace and Stability', represented by the smooth transition of power between the three presidents since independence.

2012 Series
Image		Value	Dimensions	Main Color	Description		Date of issue	Date of first issue	Watermark
Obverse	Reverse	Value	Dimensions	Main Color	Obverse	Reverse	Date of issue	Date of first issue	Watermark
		N$10	129 × 70mm	Blue	H.E. Dr. Sam Nujoma; Parliament building in Windhoek	Namibian coat of arms; three standing springbok antelope (Antidorcas marsupialis)	2011	15 May 2012	Sam Nujoma and electrotype 10
		N$20	134 × 70mm	Orange	H.E. Dr. Sam Nujoma; Parliament building in Windhoek	Namibian coat of arms; three standing red hartebeest	2011	15 May 2012	Sam Nujoma and electrotype 20
		N$50	140 × 70mm	Green	Kaptein Hendrik Witbooi; Parliament building in Windhoek	Namibian coat of arms; five standing kudo antelope (Tragelaphus stepsiceros)	2012	15 May 2012	Kaptein Hendrik Witbooi and electrotype 50
		N$100	146 × 70mm	Red	Kaptein Hendrik Witbooi; Parliament building in Windhoek	Namibian coat of arms; three standing oryx antelope (Oryx gazella)	2012	15 May 2012	Kaptein Hendrik Witbooi and electrotype 100
		N$200	152 × 70mm	Purple	Kaptein Hendrik Witbooi; Parliament building in Windhoek	Namibian coat of arms; three standing roan antelope	2012	15 May 2012	Kaptein Hendrik Witbooi and electrotype 200

== Test coins ==
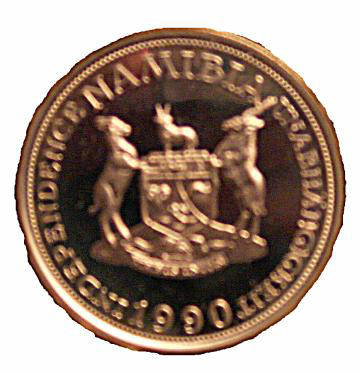
10 marks essai (reverse)

During the planning phase of the introduction of a new national currency replacing the South African rand, the newly founded Bank of Namibia minted a proof series of coins denominated in dollars as well as in marks, for the consideration of the Namibian Ministry of Finance. The decision then fell in favour of the name ‘dollar’ for the new currency.

The proof series consisted of four different coins: 1 mark, 1 dollar (both in copper/nickel), 10 marks and 10 dollars (both in silver). The obverse of the mark pieces shows a sitting lion where the dollar pieces depict a San (Bushman) with bow and arrow. All obverse sides bear the indication of denomination as well as the remark ‘PROBE’/‘ESSAI’ (proof). The reverse of the 1-mark/1-dollar pieces shows Namibia's former coat of arms surrounded by the inscription ‘NAMIBIA’, the year (1990) and two ears of corn. The ten-mark/ten-dollar pieces bear the inscription ‘INDEPENDENCE’/‘UNABHÄNGIGKEIT’ ("independence" in German) instead of the ears.

There was a series of Namibian pattern coins denominated in Rand dated 1990. This short-lived tender was cited in the 2005 edition of Krause's 'Unusual World Coins'.

== Exchange rates ==
Current NAD exchange rates
From Google Finance:	AUD CAD CHF CNY EUR GBP HKD JPY USD ZAR
From Yahoo! Finance:	AUD CAD CHF CNY EUR GBP HKD JPY USD ZAR
From XE.com:	AUD CAD CHF CNY EUR GBP HKD JPY USD ZAR
From OANDA:	AUD CAD CHF CNY EUR GBP HKD JPY USD ZAR

== See also ==
- Economy of Namibia

Preceded by: South African rand Reason: independence and Common Monetary Area; Ratio: at par	Currency of Namibia; 1993 – Concurrent with: South African rand	Succeeded by: Current
