= Ministry of Finance (Namibia) =

Government ministry of Namibia

Agency overview
- Formed: 1990; 36 years ago
- Type: Ministry
- Jurisdiction: Government of Namibia
- Headquarters: Windhoek, Namibia
- Minister responsible: Erica Shafudah
- Website: mof.gov.na

Ministry of Finance (MOF) is the department of the Government of Namibia responsible for the design and implementation of the government policy on public finance and budget. As of 2026 the finance minister is Erica Shafudah.

== History ==
It was established at Namibian independence in 1990. The first Namibian minister of finance was German Namibian Otto Herrigel.

=== Ministers ===
All finance ministers in chronological order are:

#	Picture	Name	(Birth–Death)	Party	Term start	Term end
Minister of Finance
1		Otto Herrigel	1937–2013	SWAPO	1990	1992
2		Gert Hanekom	1930–1999	SWAPO	1992	1995
3		Helmut Angula	1945–	SWAPO	1995	1996
4		Nangolo Mbumba	1941–	SWAPO	1996	2003
5		Saara Kuugongelwa	1967–	SWAPO	2003	2015
6		Calle Schlettwein	1954–	SWAPO	2015	2020
7		Iipumbu Shiimi	1970–	SWAPO	2020	2025
8		Erica Shafudah	1963–	SWAPO	2025	

== See also ==
- Economy of Namibia
