= Vitality (disambiguation) =

Vitality is the capacity of a thing to live, grow, or develop.

Vitality may also refer to:

== Organisations ==
- Team Vitality, a French esports organisation
- Vitality Corporate Services, a South Africa-based financial services company
  - VitalityHealth, a United Kingdom-based health insurance company
  - VitalityLife, a United Kingdom-based life insurance company

== Vessels ==
- HMS Vitality, called HMS Untamed (P58), a Royal Navy submarine
- USS Vitality, called HMS Willowherb (K283), a US Navy–Royal Navy patrol boat

== Other uses ==
- Vitality curve, a business management practice
- Vitalism, a biological theory and natural philosophy
- Language vitality, the degree of endangerment of a language
