= National Health Insurance Act, 2023 =

South African health legislation

Parliament of South Africa
- Long title: To achieve universal access to quality health care services in the Republic in accordance with section 27 of the Constitution; to establish a National Health Insurance Fund and to set out its powers, functions and governance structures; to provide a framework for the strategic purchasing of health care services by the Fund on behalf of users; to create mechanisms for the equitable, effective and efficient utilisation of the resources of the Fund to meet the health needs of the population; to preclude or limit undesirable, unethical and unlawful practices in relation to the Fund and its users; and to provide for matters connected herewith.
- Citation: National Health Insurance, Act 20 of 2023 (PDF).
- Enacted by: Parliament of South Africa
- Assented to: 15 May 2024; 2 years ago
- Status: Pending

The National Health Insurance Act, 2023 (Act No. 20 of 2023) is an act of the Parliament of South Africa, which establishes a South African national health insurance system, commonly referred to as NHI, with the aim of "pooling public revenue in order to actively and strategically purchase health care services" and creating a "single framework throughout the Republic for the public funding and public purchasing of health care services, medicines, health goods and health related products". The purpose of the act is to establish and maintain a National Health Insurance Fund that will serve as the "single purchaser and single payer" of health care services.

The National Health Insurance Bill was passed by the National Assembly of South Africa on 13 June 2023 and the National Council of Provinces on 6 December 2023. President Cyril Ramaphosa signed the Bill into law on 15 May 2024. The Act will take effect on a date fixed by the President by proclamation in the Government Gazette.

== Background ==
The South African healthcare system consists of a public and private sector, both of which are regulated to varying degrees by the Department of Health. The public healthcare system is utilised by approximately 84% of the South African population, and services are provided in accordance with a system of means testing. The private healthcare system services approximately 16% of the population, the majority of whom are members of medical schemes. Medical schemes are voluntary health insurance providers that finance members' access to for-profit hospitals and primary healthcare facilities. This bifurcated system is characterised by inequalities in access to and quality of healthcare services, with the public sector being severely overburdened, under-resourced and mismanaged.

The stated purpose of the NHI Act is to address these inequalities, as well as to give effect to the obligation resting on the state in terms of section 27 of the Constitution of South Africa to "take reasonable legislative and other measures, within its available resources, to achieve the "progressive realisation" of the "right to have access to health care services"."

== History ==
=== Early initiatives and contextual background ===
Social health insurance for formally employed persons in South Africa was first contemplated as part of the recommendations of the 1926 Pienaar Commission. These recommendations, whilst not immediately adopted, ultimately resulted in the expansion of the social welfare programme of the South African government throughout the 1930s. The Public Health Department established a Committee of Inquiry into NHI in 1935, which advocated for social insurance for employees in urban areas who earned below a specified threshold, to be provided on a non-racial basis.

The early 1940s saw sustained interest in the development of the South African welfare state, amidst the release of the Beveridge Report in the United Kingdom and calls from medical associations to establish a national health system. A 1944 report by the National Health Services Commission recommended the creation of a needs-based, state-administered health service. Despite the appointment of liberal United Party parliamentarian Henry Gluckman as Minister of Health in 1945, prospects of establishing a national health service waned during the post-war period, particularly following the victory of the National Party in the 1948 general election.

The early healthcare policy of the National Party was characterised by increased regulation of medical schemes and private hospitals, which serviced a majority of white South Africans by 1960, and solidified the role of the state as the primary provider of healthcare services. The call for universal free medical care featured prominently in the 1955 Freedom Charter adopted by the African National Congress, which would later come to power following the abolition of apartheid.

Budgetary constraints and the ascendancy of neoliberal economic policy led to significant deregulation of private healthcare in the 1980s, including the removal of racial restrictions on medical scheme membership. This resulted in rapid expansion of the private healthcare sector, coupled with increasing costs and widespread market fragmentation, which encouraged a proliferation of research and policy proposals on national health insurance that would later influence the policy objectives of the ANC.

=== Prelude to the introduction of the Bill ===
The healthcare landscape in the 1990s was characterised by a decrease in the quality of care provided in state hospitals, consolidation of market control in the private sector, and a moderation of the ANC's policy position on healthcare in line with prevailing macroeconomic theory. Despite the governing party's commitment to establishing and legislating for a "single comprehensive, equitable and integrated" national health system in its 1994 "National Health Plan for South Africa", successive committee reports recommended against a nationalised healthcare system. The Health Care Finance Committee of 1994, and the Committee of Inquiry into NHI of 1995, both ultimately recommended the implementation of a social health insurance system to cover contributors and their financial dependants, with a focus on the provision of hospital services. The Social Health Insurance Working Group of 1997 similarly proposed a system that would cover those formal sector employees who were not members of medical schemes.

Recommendations by the Committee of Inquiry into Comprehensive Social Security in South Africa of 2002, and the Ministerial Task Team of 2005, which favoured a more progressive social health insurance system with elements of cross-subsidisation and price controls, were largely overshadowed by the HIV/AIDS epidemic and the Mbeki government's response to the crisis. Despite significant regulatory reform of medical schemes around the turn of the millennium, private sector costs continued to increase, resulting in decreased membership of medical schemes.

The comparatively populist agenda of the Zuma administration included the urgent implementation of a publicly funded and administered system of national health insurance. This policy position featured in the ANC's 2009 election manifesto, and resulted in the establishment of the ANC NHI Task Team and NHI Ministerial Advisory Committee.

=== Legislative process ===
A Green Paper, entitled "NHI in South Africa", was gazetted by the Department of Health on 12 August 2011, contemplating the staged rollout of a national health insurance system over a 15-year period, and the implementation of health system strengthening initiatives (HSSIs) at ten specified pilot sites throughout the country from 2012-2017. This was followed by a draft White Paper, entitled "National Health Insurance for South Africa: Toward Universal Health Coverage", released on 11 December 2015, which committed to a "re-organisation of the health care system".

A revised White Paper was published on 30 June 2017, together with a policy paper on NHI Implementation, which set out the mechanisms by which national health insurance would be financed. The proposals put forward by the Department of Health were met with concern from Treasury and the Davis Tax Committee, as well as public criticism, particularly in light of reports of widespread corruption, and failures in the public healthcare sector (evidenced by the Health Standards Compliance Report and Health Ombud's report on the Life Esidimeni scandal), that severely undermined trust in government during this period.

Notwithstanding these circumstances, a draft of the NHI Bill was published for public comment on 21 June 2018, shortly after the election of Cyril Ramaphosa. This was followed by the publication of the NHI Bill on 26 July 2019. The Bill was introduced in the National Assembly on 8 August 2019 and processed by the Portfolio Committee on Health. After a number of months of public hearings, the National Assembly passed the Bill on 13 June 2023, and referred the Bill to the National Council of Provinces (NCOP) for concurrence, as is required under the Constitution in circumstances where a Bill affects the provinces. The Bill was passed by the NCOP on 6 December 2023 and assented to by Ramaphosa on 15 May 2024, following which it became an Act of Parliament.

== Provisions of the Act ==
=== Eligibility and registration ===
In order to access healthcare services purchased by the National Health Insurance Fund, an eligible person would need to register as a user of the Fund at an accredited health care service provider or establishment. These services will be provided to users for "free at the point of care" upon proof that the user is registered with the Fund. South African citizens, permanent residents, refugees, inmates, "certain categories of individual foreigners" and all children will be eligible to receive healthcare services purchased by the Fund.

As a general rule, users must receive services from the provider or establishment at which they are registered. Provision is, however, made in the Act for the "portability" of health services, and the transfer of users, in circumstances where users are unable to use their designated facilities, or where those facilities are unable to provide the necessary services. The Act further provides that a user must "first access health care services at a primary health care level" (such as from a clinic or general practitioner), and "adhere to the [prescribed] referral pathways".

=== Accreditation ===
The National Health Insurance Fund is established as an "autonomous public entity" tasked with entering into contracts with accredited health care service providers and health establishments, and determining "payment rates" for such providers, establishments and suppliers. In order to be accredited by the Fund, a provider or establishment must be certified by the Office of Health Standards Compliance and registered with a recognised "statutory health professional council". Furthermore, the provider or establishment must comply with the specific performance criteria that are set out in the Act. A "legally binding contract" is to be concluded between the Fund and the provider or establishment for the provision of primary health care services, emergency medical services and/or hospital services. Certain information must be submitted to the Fund in order to be reimbursed for services provided.

=== Purchase of healthcare services ===
The purchase of health care services by the Fund will be effected, in the case of accredited and contracted hospitals, through the transfer of funds directly to those hospitals. Funds for the provision of primary health care services will be transferred to Contracting Units for Primary Health Care, which will manage the provision of these services in specified geographical areas. A Contracting Unit will consist of a district hospital, clinics (community health centres), "ward-based outreach teams" and private providers in that area. Contracting Units will monitor the disbursement of funds to providers in the area, and it is contemplated that these units will "facilitate the integration of public and private health care services".

Accredited primary health care providers must be contracted and remunerated by the relevant Contracting Unit. Emergency medical services will be reimbursed by the Fund on a "capped case-based fee basis with adjustments made for case severity, where necessary", and public ambulance services will be reimbursed through the allocation of funds to the provinces. Payments in respect of specialist and hospital services will be "all-inclusive" and "based on the performance" of the provider, establishment or supplier.

The procurement processes in respect of health-related products will be determined by the Office of Health Products Procurement, and will be subject to existing procurement laws and policies. The Act provides for the development and maintenance of a formulary, comprising an Essential Medicine List, Essential Equipment List, and list of approved health-related products, according to which procurement must be conducted.

=== Advisory Committees ===
Three principal advisory committees of the Fund are to be established by the Minister of Health. The Benefits Advisory Committee will determine the health care service benefits that will be provided and reimbursed by the Fund, and develop treatment guidelines for implementation at primary health care facilities and hospitals. The Health Care Benefits Pricing Committee will recommend the prices of health service benefits to the Fund. The Stakeholder Advisory Committee will comprise representatives from various health professions councils provided for in terms of South African law, as well as interested persons from civil society and labour unions.

=== Funding and implementation ===
The primary source of the revenue of the Fund will be monies appropriated annually by Parliament. This will be derived from general tax revenue, the reallocation of funding for medical scheme tax credits, payroll tax and a surcharge on personal income tax. These measures are to be introduced through a money bill in accordance with the process prescribed in the Constitution.

The Act contemplates that National Health Insurance would be "gradually phased in using a progressive and programmatic approach based on financial resource availability". The first phase would entail, among other things, the establishment of the Fund, structuring of Contracting Units, development of an accreditation process for providers and establishments, amendment of relevant legislation, and purchasing health care service benefits from contracted public and private providers. The second phase would entail the "establishment and operationalisation of the Fund as a purchaser of health care services".

Several pieces of existing legislation are to be repealed or amended, and the provisions of the Act prevail in the event of a conflict between those provisions and the provisions of most other pieces of legislation. The role of medical schemes is due to be greatly diminished, as these entities are only to be permitted to offer "complementary cover" for "services not reimbursable by the Fund".

== Reaction ==
The introduction of the NHI Bill elicited mixed responses from political parties, industry stakeholders and the public at large. A 2019 survey conducted by the Solidarity Research Institute revealed considerable reservations amongst healthcare workers regarding the capacity of the Department of Health to implement and manage a national health insurance scheme. Similar concerns were raised in a 2020 report by the Institute of Risk Management in South Africa, and the submissions made to the Department of Health by several civil society groups following the publication of the draft NHI Bill in 2018. These groups included the Helen Suzman Foundation, Section27 and the People's Health Movement. Legislative reform has been widely regarded by academics as an inadequate intervention to address the deficiencies in the South African healthcare system, which include mismanagement, failing infrastructure and staffing shortages.

A petition against the NHI Bill by the South African Medical Association, which has garnered approximately 78,000 signatures as of October 2023, has been supported by the official opposition Democratic Alliance. In addition to the DA, the Economic Freedom Fighters, African Christian Democratic Party and Inkatha Freedom Party have criticised the Bill. The passage of the Bill was welcomed by the Congress of South African Trade Unions, and described as a "catalyst for universal health access" by the national spokesperson of the governing ANC.

Pharmaceutical industry stakeholders have foreshadowed potential legal challenges to the Act, which could forestall its implementation. The CEO of Business Leadership South Africa has criticised the Act's cost implications, as well as the absence of provisions facilitating public-private partnerships. The CEO of Discovery Health, Adrian Gore, raised similar concerns, and advocated for amendments to the Bill to provide for private-sector collaboration. Business Unity SA and Business for SA released a joint statement outlining the potential tax implications of the NHI Bill, based on an impact analysis conducted by FTI Consulting.

Support for the implementation of NHI is generally higher amongst users of public healthcare services, as opposed to private sector users who are members of medical schemes. In a 2013 study, support for such implementation amongst the former group was 79.2%, compared to 48.9% amongst the latter group. The proportion of respondents who indicated that they had access to information on the NHI Bill was, however, low at 20.4%.

=== High Court ruling ===
On 24 July 2024, the Gauteng Division of the High Court ruled that certain provisions of the National Health Act 61 of 2003 — the statute that provides the legal framework for the South African healthcare system — were unconstitutional. Sections 36–40 of the Act, which remained inoperative at the time of the judgment but would have required healthcare service providers and facilities to obtain a certificate of need from the National Department of Health in order to operate in a particular geographical area, were found to be irrational and invalid, and accordingly severed from the Act. The ruling has yet to be confirmed by the Constitutional Court. The judgment has been interpreted as calling into question the constitutionality of the system of central planning envisaged by the NHI Act.
