= Adrian Gore =

South African businessman (born 1964)

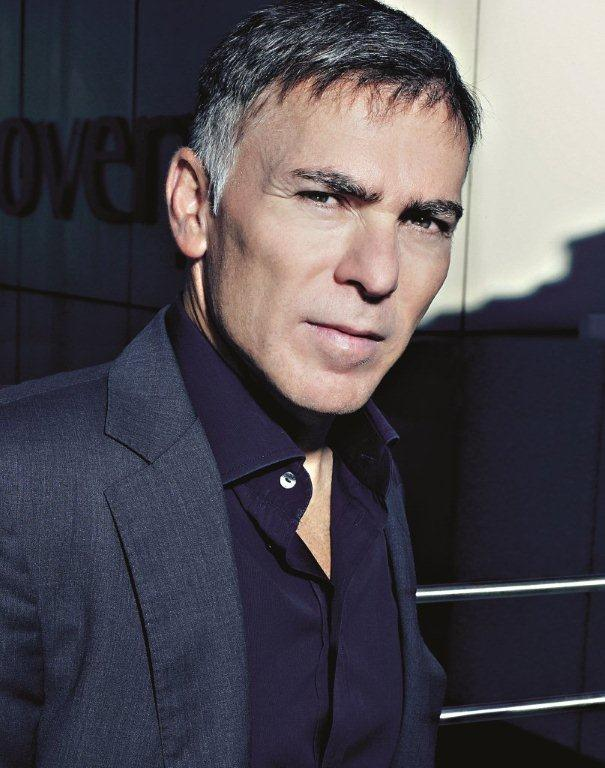
- Born: 16 May 1964 (age 61); South Africa
- Education: University of Witwatersrand (Bachelor of Science)
- Occupations: Founder & CEO
- Organization: Discovery Limited
- Awards: Wits Manex Award; All Africa Businessman of the Year; Frost & Sullivan Visionary Innovation Leadership Award for Africa; Sunday Times Business Leader of the Year

Adrian Gore (born 16 May 1964) is a South African businessman and entrepreneur. He is the founder and group chief executive of major South African financial services and private healthcare company Discovery Limited.

== Biography ==
Gore graduated from University of Witwatersrand with a Bachelor of Science degree in actuarial science. He began his career in 1986 as a trainee actuary at Liberty Life, later leading product development.

Gore launched Discovery Limited, a medical insurer, in South Africa in 1992. In 1992, Gore raised seed money for Discovery from Laurie Dippenaar, and other funders who founded Rand Merchant Bank. Discovery has since evolved into a diversified and multinational financial services group.

Prior to Discovery limited, Adrian Gore worked at Liberty Life, an insurance and investment firm.

Adrian is married and has two daughters and a son. His hobbies are running, cycling, reading.

== Recognition ==
He is a fellow of the Actuarial Society of South Africa, a fellow of the Faculty of Actuaries (Edinburgh), an associate of the Society of Actuaries (Chicago), and a member of the American Academy of Actuaries.

In 1998, Gore was recognised as South Africa's best entrepreneur by Ernst & Young, and in 2004 was chosen as South Africa's leading CEO in the annual MoneyWeb CEO of the Year Awards. In 2008 he received the Investec award for considerable contribution in a career or profession, and in 2010, was named as the Sunday Times business leader of the year.

In 2013, Gore received the Manex Award from the University of the Witwatersrand Business School. In 2015, he was included in the Forbes list of "Africa's 50 Richest". In 2015 Adrian was the recipient of the McKinsey Geneva Forum of Health Award. Also, he included in "All Africa Businessman of the Year 2016".

In August 2017, Adrian won the Frost & Sullivan Visionary Innovation Leadership Award for Africa.

Gore chairs the South African chapter of Endeavor – a global non-profit organisation that identifies and assists high-growth entrepreneurs.

== See also ==
- Discovery Limited
- VitalityHealth
- MMI Holdings Limited
- Rand Merchant Insurance Holdings
