= Anton Rupert =

South African businessman (1916–2006)

- Born: 4 October 1916; Graaff-Reinet, Cape Province (now Eastern Cape), South Africa
- Died: 18 January 2006 (aged 89); Stellenbosch, Western Cape, South Africa
- Education: University of Pretoria
- Occupations: Businessman, conservationist
- Spouse: Huberte Goote
- Children: 3, including Johann

Anthony Edward Rupert OMSG (4 October 1916 – 18 January 2006) was a South African businessman and conservationist.

He was born on 4 October 1916 and raised in the small town of Graaff-Reinet in the Eastern Cape Province of the Union of South Africa. He studied in Pretoria and ultimately moved to Stellenbosch, where he established the Rembrandt Group and where it still has its headquarters today. He died in his sleep at his home in Thibault Street, Stellenbosch at the age of 89.

== Early life ==
After dropping out of medical school due to a lack of funds, Rupert earned a chemistry degree at the University of Pretoria, where he also lectured for a short while. Subsequently, he started a dry-cleaning business.

Sometime later, with an initial investment of £10 and together with two fellow investors, he started manufacturing cigarettes in his garage, which he eventually built into the tobacco and industrial conglomerate Rembrandt Group, overseeing its transition to the industrial and luxury branded goods sectors, with Rembrandt eventually splitting into Remgro (an investment company with financial, mining and industrial interests) and Richemont (a Swiss-based luxury goods group). Currently, this business empire encompasses hundreds of companies located in 35 countries on six continents, with combined yearly net sales in the region of US$10 billion.

Rupert had also been deeply involved in environmental conservation and his companies have been prominent in funding the fine arts; since 1964, foundations established by Rembrandt have used a part of the group's profits for the promotion of education, art, music and the preservation of historical buildings.

He also played an important role in the South African Small Business Development Corporation (SBDC), a non-profit company whose loans to small and medium-sized businesses have created nearly half a million jobs since 1981.

== Business career ==
Rupert established the tobacco company "Voorbrand Tobacco Company" in 1939 manufacturing snuff. He soon renamed it Rembrandt Ltd., whose overseas tobacco interests were consolidated into Rothmans in 1972.

In 1988, the Rembrandt group founded the Swiss luxury goods company, Richemont, which in turn acquired Rembrandt's shares in Rothmans. Richemont also owns such luxury brands as Cartier (jewellery); Alfred Dunhill and Sulka (designer clothing); Seeger (leather bags); Piaget, Baume & Mercier and Vacheron Constantin (Swiss watches) and Montblanc (writing instruments).

In 1995, Rembrandt and Richemont consolidated their respective tobacco interests into Rothmans International, which was at the time the world's fourth largest cigarette manufacturer. In 1999, Rothmans International merged with British American Tobacco (BAT), the world's second-largest cigarette producer. Remgro held 10% and Richemont held 18.6% of BAT before unbundling.

Anton's eldest son, Johann Rupert, is now the CEO of Richemont and chairman of Remgro.

The Rupert family is also deeply involved in the South African wine and liquor industry, owning the L'Ormarins and La Motte wine estates and having a stake in Rupert & Rothschild Vignerons, the wine-making partnership between the Rupert and Rothschild families (at the time of his death due to a car crash in 2001, Rupert's youngest son, Anthonij, was head of Rupert & Rothschild Vignerons).

The Ruperts also partially control two of South Africa's largest wine merchant houses, Stellenbosch Farmers' Winery (SFW) and Distillers Corporation, who together produce one of every six bottles of wine in South Africa and nearly eighty percent of the country's brandy. These two companies have merged to form Distell Group Limited.

Among other interests, the Rupert Group also owns South Africa's second-largest chain of private hospitals, the Medi-Clinic Corporation, with 5,500 beds.

According to his biography, Rupert's business career spanned over sixty years. He started his global empire with a personal investment of just £10 in 1941 becoming named on the Forbes list of 500 wealthiest families worldwide. At the time of his death, his assets were estimated at $1.7 billion.

== Politics ==
In 1966, he was mentioned as a possible candidate for Prime Minister as a part of a "Verwoerd must go" campaign. The Cape Province section of the ruling National Party endorsed Rupert over Verwoerd, citing the need to improve South Africa's international standing and Rupert's image as a "moderate" who could unify the country, whilst still maintaining and developing the Apartheid system. Verwoerd was assassinated within one month, and hardliner John Vorster was endorsed by the NP caucus to replace him; Vorster was to become South Africa's longest consecutive-serving head of government.

He was a member of the secret Afrikaner society, the Afrikaner Broederbond in the 1940s, but eventually he dismissed it as an "absurdity", and allowed his membership to lapse.

== Involvement in conservation ==
Rupert was a founding member of the WWF (World Wildlife Fund) and it was in his role as the president of the organisation's South African branch that he took a lead in the creation of trans-frontier parks (also known as trans-frontier conservation areas (TFCAs) or "peace parks"), such as the Lubombo Transfrontier Conservation Area. He also established The 1001: A Nature Trust in 1970, a financial endowment to fund the organisation.

With an initial grant of 1.2 million Rand (US$260,000) from the Rupert Nature Foundation, the Peace Parks Foundation was established on 1 February 1997 to facilitate the establishment of TFCAs in southern Africa. Nelson Mandela, Prince Bernhard of the Netherlands and Anton Rupert were the founding patrons of the Peace Parks Foundation. In 2000, the Cape Tercentenary Foundation awarded him the Molteno Medal for lifetime services to cultural and nature conservation.

== Acknowledgement ==
In 2004, he was voted 28th in the television series, Top 100 Great South Africans.

Academic offices
Preceded by Alwyn Schlebusch	Chancellor of the University of Pretoria; 1987–1992	Succeeded by Chris Stals
