= Flont =

Flont, Inc.
- Company type: Private
- Industry: E-commerce
- Founded: 2016
- Founder: Cormac Kinney
- Headquarters: New York City, United States
- Area served: United States
- Key people: Carmen Busquets, Adrian Cheng

Flont was a jewelry rental service e-commerce company founded in 2016 and available from May 2017 to 2019. Flont employed a 'jewelry as a service' model, where customers could subscribe for a monthly or yearly fee and in exchange receive unlimited jewelry rentals from the site. Its founder Cormac Kinney was a former president of a joint venture with Cartier and Richemont.

In 2018, Chow Tai Fook announced a joint venture with Flont to open up to 500 locations in China inside Chow Tai Fook retail stores.

The company shut down its business in 2019.

== History ==
In 2016, Flont was founded by Cormac Kinney in partnership with over 40 brands. In 2017, Adrian Cheng, executive Chairman of Chow Tai Fook and New World Development, announced a $2 million seed-round investment in the company. The startup announced a $5 million capital raise in October 2017. As of 2023, the flont.com website was no longer accessible.
