= Youi =

Australian insurance company

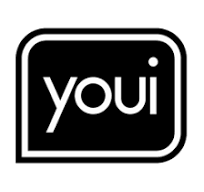
- Type: Private
- Industry: Insurance
- Founded: 2007
- Headquarters: Sippy Downs, Queensland, Australia
- Area served: Australia
- Key people: Nathaniel Simpson (CEO)
- Products: vehicle, home and contents insurance, roadside assistance and small business insurance
- Services: Insurance
- Number of employees: 1,700 (2024)
- Parent: OUTsurance
- Website: www.youi.com.au

Youi is an Australian general insurance company headquartered in Sippy Downs, Queensland. The company provides car, home, motorcycle, caravan, watercraft, and small business insurance across Australia. Youi's insurance is available in each Australian state and territory except the Northern Territory.

Youi was founded in 2007 by South African company OUTsurance, but it is regulated in Australia by the Australian Prudential Regulation Authority (APRA) and the Australian Securities and Investments Commission (ASIC), and it's a member of the Insurance Council of Australia.

== History ==
Youi Pty Ltd was registered in Australia in 2007 and began selling insurance in 2008. It was established by its parent company OUTsurance, the first African company to set up an insurance firm in Australia. OUTsurance is also a Rand Merchant Investment Holdings subsidiary, a South African investment holding company.

In 2014, OUTsurance launched Youi New Zealand as the subsidiary of Youi Australia. In September 2019, Youi sold its 34,000 New Zealand policies to Tower. As of 2022, the company is headquartered in Queensland and has an office in Sydney. Nathaniel Simpson succeeded founding chief executive Hugo Schreuder in July 2023.

The company provides insurance services and insurance products including car insurance, home insurance, business liability, motorcycle insurance, caravan insurance, trailer insurance, and roadside assistance.

== Sponsorship ==
Youi has sponsored the Brisbane Lions since 2020 and became the club's principal partner in November 2024 under a five-year agreement covering its AFL and AFLW teams. It has been an official insurance partner of the National Rugby League since 2017 and is a partner of the 2026 Rugby League World Cup.
