= Loubier =

Loubier is a family name of French origin and may refer to:

- Gabriel Loubier (1932–2025), Canadian Union Nationale politician
- Hans Loubier (1863–1931), German librarian and art historian
- Jean-Marc Loubier, French businessman, CEO of Escada
- Yvan Loubier (born 1959), Canadian Bloc Québécois / Parti Québécois politician
