= Cormac Kinney =

Software architect and businessperson

- Born: Cormac Kinney; June 18, 1971 (age 55); St. Louis, Missouri
- Education: Carnegie Mellon University (BS and MS)
- Occupations: Entrepreneur; Inventor
- Title: Founder of Diamond Standard
- Spouse: Mimi So (m. 2000)

Cormac Kinney is a serial entrepreneur, known for Diamond Standard, a regulator-approved fungible diamond commodity, Heatmaps, cited in 5,800 US Patents, and a publisher social network acquired by News Corp.

== Early life ==
Kinney grew up in University City, Missouri, a suburb of St. Louis, the oldest of six children. He graduated from Carnegie Mellon University's College of Engineering, earning a Bachelor of Science degree, and a Master of Science in 5 years, skipping one year of college, but leaving a Software Engineering degree uncompleted.

He has lived in Manhattan, New York City since 1994, and is married to Mimi So, an influential jewelry designer.

== Career ==
As a student at Carnegie Mellon, Kinney founded two small software companies in succession, acquired by Northwestern Mutual Life Insurance Co., and JD Edwards. Both were related to optimization.

=== Heatmaps, NeoVision ===
In 1993, with Carnegie Mellon Senior Research Scientist, Marc Graham, Kinney founded NeoVision Hypersystems, Inc. to develop and market the Heat maps technology. The term "heat map" was coined by Kinney and trademarked in 1993, but the trademark was unintentionally abandoned by its acquirer.

As of January 2020, since 1993, Heat maps have been cited in over 5,550 patents granted by the US PTO, and in 200,000 peer reviewed research papers.

As developed by Neovision, Heat maps were a real time middleware and computation platform used to rapidly develop trading and risk management systems, featuring the first commercial application of heat maps. Citibank was a key initial client, for which Kinney designed a risk management application for the global capital markets division in 1999. Ultimately the Neovision technology was installed on over 100 institutional trading desks, and at Nasdaq and the DTC for monitoring $1.7 trillion in daily transactions.

Distribution licenses were signed with Bloomberg L.P., Dow Jones Telerate, Thomson, and Reuters to install Heatmaps to over 300,000 desktops. The Nasdaq incorporated Heatmaps into the front page of www.nasdaq.com from 2001 through 2013.

In 2002, Kinney designed a trade cost analysis system for Fidelity Investments which was cited by The Wall Street Journal as "a sophisticated tracking system to see which brokers can execute trades most efficiently," and was credited with reducing the mutual-fund firm's trading costs by hundreds of millions of dollars per year, to half the industry average. This system was installed at Bank of America Investment Management, Invesco, Janus, Merrill Lynch Investment Management and Putnam Investments.

Brian Barefoot, President of PaineWebber International, and former global head of sales and trading at Merrill Lynch joined NeoVision as CEO, and Deutsche Bank's COO joined the board of directors. Subsequent to NeoVision, Barefoot became President of Babson College for seven years.

Neovision raised $8 million from Deutsche Bank, Bear Stearns, Intel Corporation and venture capital investors. After a planned $30 million IPO fell through due to the dot com crash, NeoVision was acquired in 2003 by The Carlyle Group and merged into financial software conglomerate SS&C Technologies. Today the NeoVision technologies are incorporated into several SS&C products.

=== Sentiment Strategies ===
After the sale of NeoVision, Kinney shifted his focus to quantitative trading, developing a computational linguistics based trading system, which he used to manage hedge fund strategies at Amaranth Advisors, and Tudor Investment Corp. Subsequently, he launched Sentiment Strategies, a New York-based hedge fund consulting firm, additionally managing a $400 million portfolio for Millennium Management, and QuantFund LLC, a quantitative hedge fund.

=== News Corp Social Network ===
In 2013, Kinney developed a social network for users for business news sites, based upon his design for a social graph to track the news consumption of a large number of readers. The system recommends articles to readers based on their profile and interests, and based on news discovered by peers sharing those interests. Rupert Murdoch of News Corp financed the development of the concept, simply named "Network," and agreed to implement Kinney's technology in The Wall Street Journal, and other News Corp publications. News Corp announced the initiative as a LinkedIn competitor. Kinney brought together a team of 70 staff from various News Corp and Wall Street Journal departments to build the technology. Network's recommendation and social features were a key element of the WSJ.com redesign, launched in 2015. Kinney intended Network to be used by a consortium of leading publishers, aggregating their reader's interests, to enable cross-publication recommendations. Although The New York Times, The Washington Post, Time, Inc., Forbes and other publishers expressed interest, News Corp decided to acquire Network in order to keep it exclusive to its own publications.

=== Flont ===
In 2016, Kinney launched Flont, a platform to introduce designer fine jewelry into the sharing economy. Flont provides fine jewelry as a service, in partnership with over 40 brands. A software developer and jewelry retailer, it enables high-touch sales via E-commerce, delivering jewelry to consumers on demand. Flont provides software and logistics services to global jewelry brands, department stores and jewelry retailers for their own sharing services.

In 2018, Chow Tai Fook, the largest jewelry retailer in Asia with a market cap of HK$106 billion, announced a joint venture with Flont, to open up to 500 locations in China, inside Chow Tai Fook retail stores.

=== Diamond Standard Co. ===
In June 2019, Kinney launched Diamond Standard, the producer of the first regulator approved, fungible natural diamond commodity, which is delivered as a coin or a bar, and traded as a regulator-approved digital token. The Diamond Standard commodities are the underlying spot asset for a futures contract being listed on the CME and an ETF being listed on the NYSE, subject to regulatory approvals.

== Awards ==
- Carnegie Mellon Entrepreneur of the Year 1994
- Pennsylvania Small Business Entrepreneur of the Year 1994
