= RMB Holdings =

South African financial services holding company

RMB Holdings Limited
- Trade name: RMH
- Type: Public
- Traded as: JSE: RMH
- ISIN: ZAE000024501
- Industry: Banking and finance
- Founded: 1987; 39 years ago
- Headquarters: Sandton, Gauteng, South Africa
- Area served: South Africa
- Key people: Gerrit Ferreira (Chairman)
- Revenue: ▲ R86 million (2025)
- Operating income: ▼ −R243 million (2025)
- Net income: ▼ −R245 million (2025)
- Total assets: ▼ R720 million (2025)
- Total equity: ▼ R662 million (2025)
- Website: rmh.co.za

RMH, officially RMB Holdings Limited, is a South African diversified financial services holding company.

The company is listed on the JSE, and is headquartered in Sandton, Gauteng.

== History ==
RMH traces its roots from Rand Consolidated Investments (RCI) and Rand Merchant Bank, which were founded in 1977 and 1968 respectively. RCI was co-founded by Paul Harris, Gerrit Ferreira and Lauritz Dippenaar.

The company's objective was to offer leveraged leasing and off-balance-sheet financing to businesses. RCI failed to secure a banking licence; this led to the firm joining forces with Johann Rupert's Rand Merchant Bank in 1985. The newly created entity took up the Rand Merchant Bank name.

=== 1987 to 2010 ===
In 1987, RMH was founded as the holding company for the expanding Rand Merchant Bank. RMH was listed through a reverse listing when it took control of Momentum Life on 1 July 1992. RMH acquired 30% and 28.7% stake in Momentum Life from ABSA and Remgro respectively.

RMH also transferred its entire stake in Rand Merchant Bank to Momentum, thereby increasing its stake in Momentum Life to 76.4%. In the same year, the group founded Discovery Limited along with Adrian Gore as a subsidiary of Momentum Life.

On February 28, 1998 the group founded OUTsurance, a short-term insurance company. In April 1998, RMH entered into an agreement with Anglo American Corporation of South Africa (now Anglo American plc) to merge their financial services into a unified group.

This merger gave rise to First Rand, which was listed on the Johannesburg Stock Exchange on May 25, 1998, with Anglo American and RMH owning 20.43% and 25.03% of the authorized capital of FirstRand respectively. FirstRand had two main subsidiaries, FirstRand Bank and FirstRand Insurance, holding banking and insurance investments respectively.

=== 2011 to date ===
On March 31, 2010, Momentum merged with Metropolitan Holdings to form MMI Holdings. This followed an agreement between the boards of Metropolitan Holdings, First Rand and Momentum Group.

In March 2011, RMH, Remgro and FirstRand entered into an agreement to restructure their insurance assets. This was done by spanning off their entire insurance portfolios (i.e. MMI Holdings, Discovery Limited, OUTsurance and RMB-SI Investments) to RMI Holdings, a wholly owned subsidiary of RMH and subsequently unbundling the entire shareholding in RMI Holdings to their shareholders.

This restructure was completed on 7 March 2011. The shares of RMIH started trading at the JSE on the same day. RMB Structured Insurance Limited underwrites customer policy benefits for Prime Meridian Direct (Pty) Ltd.

After the RMI Holdings spin-off, the firm remained as a bank holding company.

== Investments ==
RMH's investment include:

- RHM Property (RMHP) – 100% shareholding – This is the property arm of RMH. It holds the following investments:
  - Atterbury – 27.5% shareholding – Atterbury is a developer of prime commercial, retail and industrial property across South Africa such as Mall of Africa, the rest of Africa and Europe.
  - Propertuity – 34% shareholding – Founded by Jonathan Liebmann, Propertuity is focused on the redevelopment of dilapidated industrial and office areas in Johannesburg and Durban.

RMH previously held a 34.1% stake in FirstRand, which it unbundled to its shareholders in June 2020. This left the holding company with its property portfolio listed above as its only investments. Its stock is listed on the JSE and the Namibian Stock Exchange.

== Ownership ==
The shares of RMH are listed on the JSE. As of June 2015 the shareholding of RMH was as follows:

RMH
Rank	Name of owner	Percentage ownership
1	Financial Securities Limited (Remgro)	28.2
2	Royal Bafokeng Holdings Proprietary Limited	15.0
3	Public Investment Corporation	10.0
4	LL Dippenaar	5.3
5	Other local and international investors	41.5
	Total	100.00

== Governance ==
RMH is governed by a 16-person board of directors, with Gerrit Thomas Ferreira as the chairman of the board. This structure is similar to that of RMI Holdings since the two firms share their management team and resources under a management contract.

== See also ==
- Rand Merchant Insurance Holdings
- FirstRand
- MMI Holdings Limited
- Discovery Limited
- Remgro
- JSE Limited
