= Discovery Health =

Discovery Health may refer to:

== Television channels ==
- Discovery Fit & Health, an American cable television network dedicated to fitness and health, launched in 2011 from a merger of Discovery Health Channel and FitTV
- Discovery Health Channel, a former American cable television network which was replaced in 2011 by the OWN: Oprah Winfrey Network and later returned as Discovery Fit & Health later that same year
- Discovery Home & Health, a UK television channel formerly known as Discovery Health
- FYI (Canada), a Canadian television channel formerly known as Discovery Health and Twist TV

== Other ==
- Discovery Health (South Africa), administrator of the Discovery Health Medical Scheme, the largest open medical scheme in South Africa. It is a subsidiary of Discovery Limited.
