= Loeb's (department store) =

American department store chain

LOEB'S, INC.
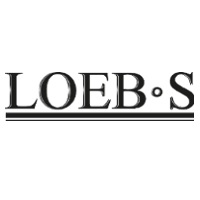
- Type: Private
- Industry: Retail
- Founded: 1887; 139 years ago in Meridian, Mississippi
- Headquarters: 2209 Front Street, Meridian, Mississippi, US
- Key people: Robert Loeb, President
- Products: Clothing, footwear, eyewear, accessories, outdoor gear
- Website: loebsclothing.com

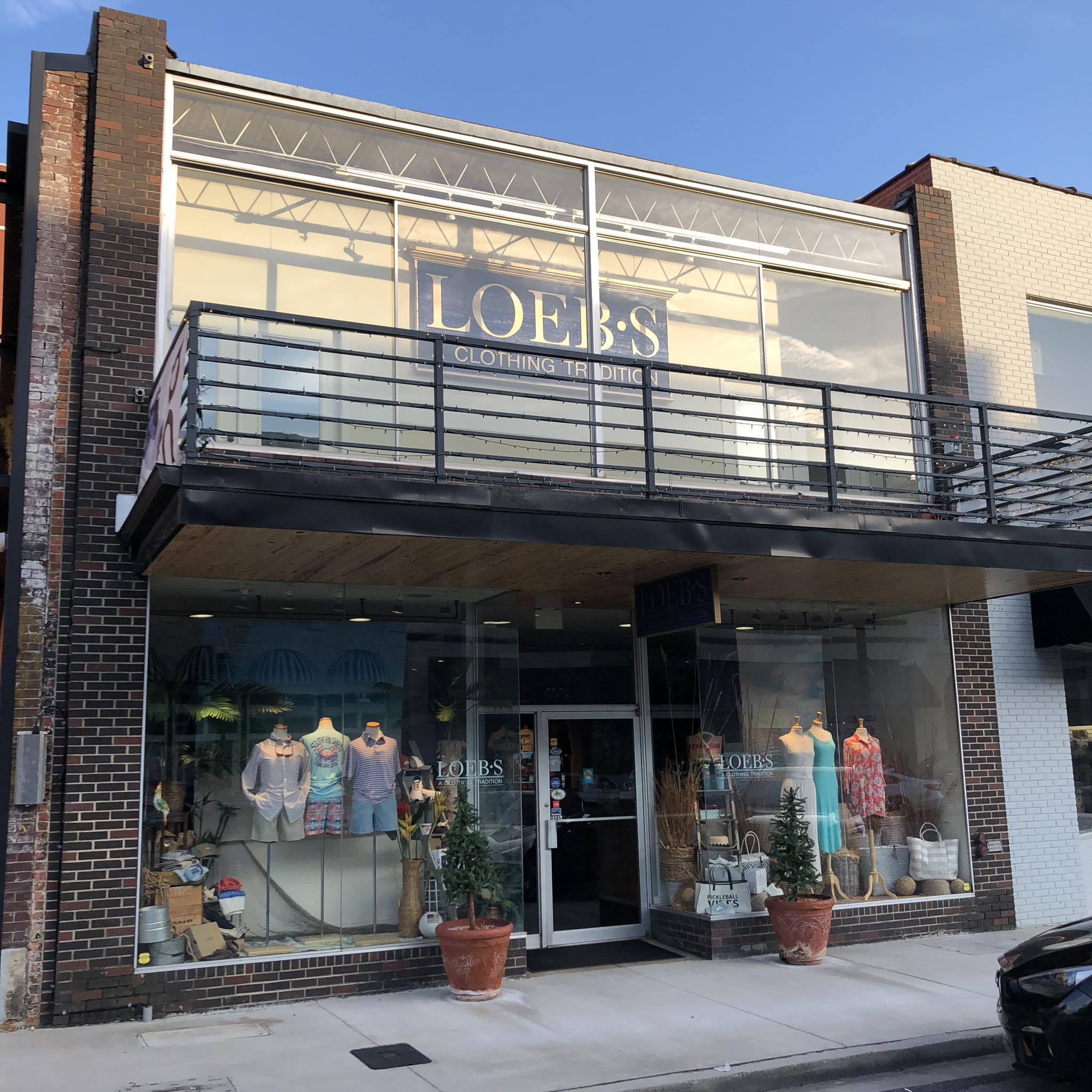
The LOEB'S Clothing Company today in Meridian, Mississippi

Loeb's Inc. is an American department store based in Meridian, Mississippi. Loeb's was founded in 1887 by Alex Loeb as Alex Loeb, Inc. Today, Loeb's legal name is "LOEB'S, INC." Loeb's is located on Front Street, Meridian.

== History ==
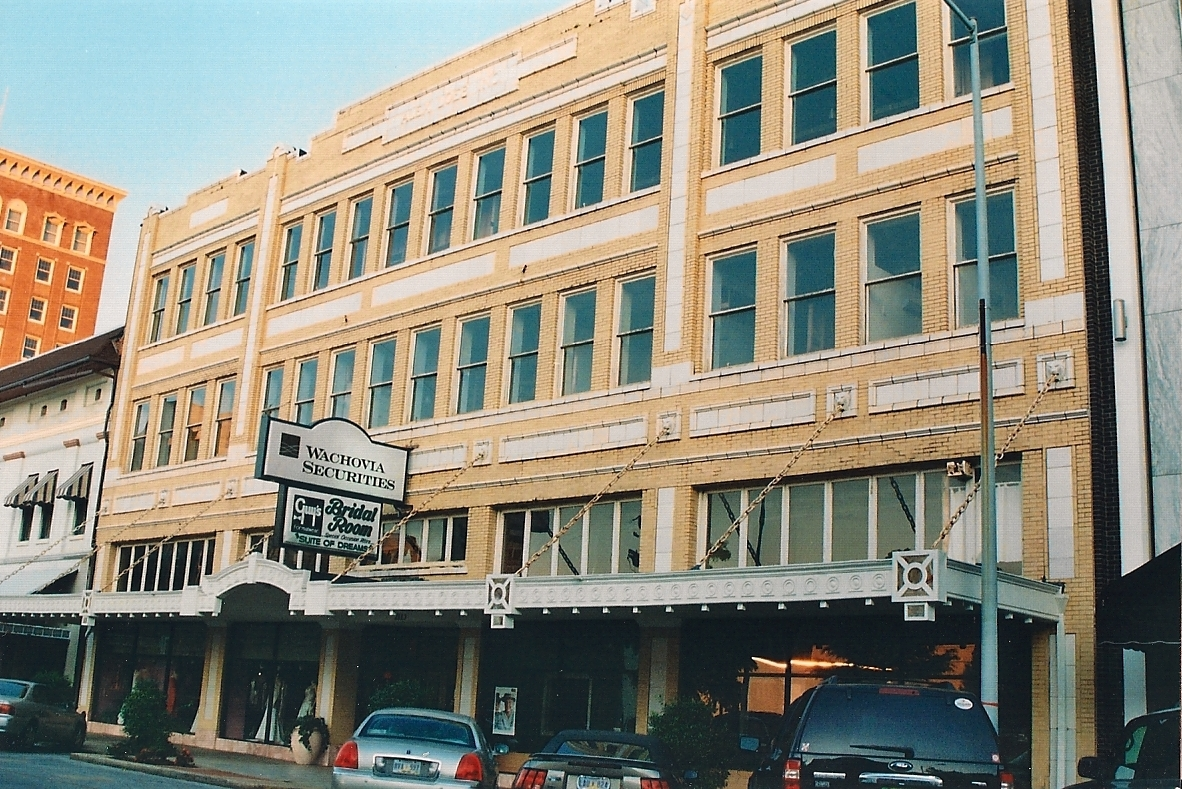
The Alex Loeb building. Loeb's previous location on 5th Street in Meridian, Mississippi.

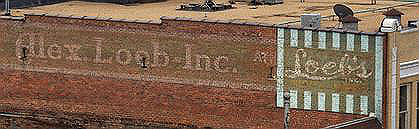
The Alex Loeb building. Painted signage on the left side of Loeb's previous location on 5th Street in Meridian, Mississippi.

Alex Loeb was a merchant in Meridian in the late 19th century. Loeb emigrated from Germany to Meridian from Columbus, Mississippi to open his first store. Alex Loeb was the first Loeb in Meridian, brought to the United States from Germany by his brother, Simon Loeb, who preceded him in Columbus. Born in Bavaria, Simon Loeb arrived in Columbus in 1867.

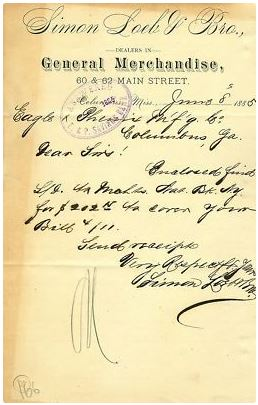
Simon Loeb and Company

In 1874, he created the store with his younger brother, Julius. They sold dry goods, clothing, and shoes. Although Simon arrived in Columbus with little money, he and his brother eventually became successful merchants.

During Meridian's "golden age" in the early 20th century, it was said that respectable railroad workers would only wear clothes from Alex Loeb's store. The well-dressed Loeb was a colorful character known for his white mustache, ever-present cigar, and hospitable personality; he would personally welcome each customer as he or she entered the store. Alex Loeb's son, Abraham Marshall Loeb, and his brother Henry S. Loeb took over the business after their father.

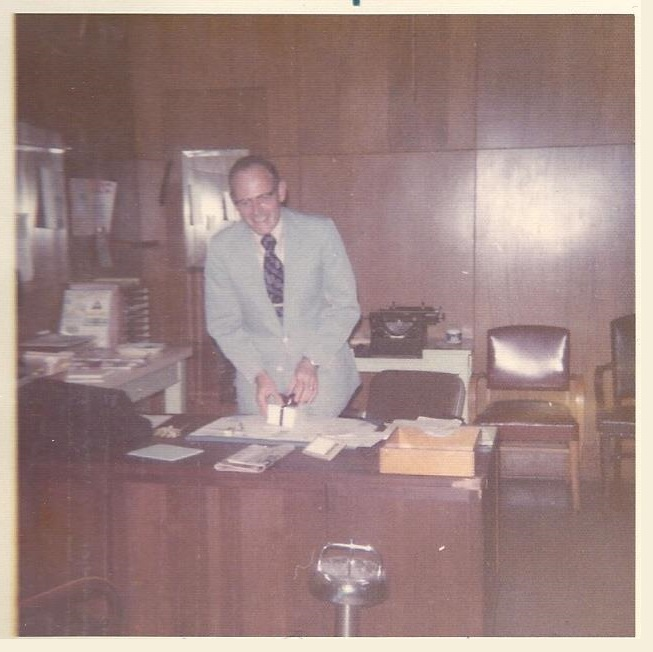
Robert Switzer Loeb, Sr. President at Marks-Rothenberg Department Store in Meridian, Mississippi

The business then passed to A. Marshall Loeb's son, Robert Switzer Loeb Sr., and his brother Alexander Marshall Loeb. The two brothers, Robert and Alex, acquired the Marks-Rothenberg Co. department store on 6th Street during the 1970s and ran the business until the late 1970s when the company was sold to a national retail chain.

In the year 1987, Robert S. Loeb Jr. returned to Meridian after working as a buyer at Parisian department store in Birmingham, Alabama. When Robert S. Loeb Jr. returned to his native Meridian to open a men's clothing store, he was guided, in part, by a business philosophy espoused by his great-grandfather a century earlier, which was to offer customers quality merchandise, prompt attention, and a big dose of Southern hospitality.It was Robert's vision to bring the clothing tradition back to Meridian. Today, Loeb's is operated by Robert S. Loeb Jr., and the business continues on Front Street in Downtown Meridian. Under Robert Jr.'s leadership, the business model has transformed into an outdoor and lifestyle-inspired store.

== Loeb's online ==
Loeb's has maintained its website since 2004 but did not start selling products online until 2013. In Fall of 2013, Loeb's launched a new e-commerce website and began selling products from its brick-and-mortar store to customers online.

In 2017, Loeb's announced the launching of a new e-commerce website featuring many of its products. According to a news release, the website featured inventory control technology that made the online buying experience seamless with the in-store experience and provided a more user-friendly online buying experience with custom site features. In 2019, Loeb's closed its e-commerce presence to return a focus on its in-store customer service.

== Products and services ==
Brand name products are available at Loeb's. Products range from outdoor-inspired clothing and travel gear for men, women, and kids to a large selection of men's suits and dress clothes. Loeb's carries brands by Loeb's own brand LOEB'S, and Loeb's own Alex Loeb Heritage Collection brand, On running shoes, Fish Hippie, Olukai, Peter Millar, Duck Head, Sorel, The North Face, Patagonia, Goodr sunglasses, KREWE sunglasses, Columbia, Eagles Nest Outfitters, Costa Del Mar, Ralph Lauren, Chaco, Teva, Bostonian, H.S. Trask, Kavu, Jack Victor, and Clarks.

Personal shopping guides are available by appointment at Loeb's. The shopping guide is chosen for the customer based on the customer's needs or is selected by the customer. The shopping guide plans the customer's shopping experience and provides one-on-one customer service. Loeb's also offers shopping guides by appointment over FaceTime for customers who can't visit the store in person. No purchase is necessary for this service.

Loeb's also provides tuxedo rental services for weddings, formals, and black tie events.

Loeb's was recognized by MR Magazine for offering books from local Mississippi authors such as Gridiron Gold by Frascogna, A book of stories from legendary Mississippi high school football coaches.

Featuring products by the North Face, the North Face Concept Store is a department on the second floor of Loeb's store dedicated to the outdoor clothing brand. This department is modeled after free-standing The North Face stores, including the light fixtures and paint.
