= Delvaux (company) =

Belgian manufacturer of fine leather luxury goods

Delvaux Créateur S.A.
- Trade name: Delvaux
- Type: Société Anonyme
- Industry: Luxury goods
- Founded: 1829; 197 years ago
- Founder: Charles Delvaux
- Headquarters: Brussels, Belgium
- Key people: Jean-Marc Loubier (CEO)
- Products: handbags
- Owner: Richemont
- Website: delvaux.com

Delvaux is a Belgian manufacturer of fine leather luxury goods founded in 1829 by Charles Delvaux. The company is the oldest fine leather luxury goods house in the world. Since 2021 the company has been owned by Richemont.

== History ==
In 1829, a year before Belgium declared its independence, Charles Delvaux opened a travel goods workshop and store in Brussels, Belgium.

In 1883, Delvaux was granted the title of "Official purveyor to the Royal Court of Belgium” as it started supplying leather goods to Belgium’s royalty.

In 1908, Delvaux filed its first patents for handbags.

Delvaux is a warrant holder to the Court of Belgium.

The house went into a gradual decline at the beginning of the 20th century. In 1933 an agricultural engineer with no experience in leather goods, Franz Schwennicke, took over the company from Edmond Delvaux, the last of the Delvaux family line. While keeping the manufacturing of travel goods, he progressively introduced a new concept for the time, the creation of seasonal collections, as is still done to this day.

For the 1958 Brussels World Fair, Delvaux introduced the "Le Brillant" handbag, designed by Paule Goethals. The range-topping "Le Brillant", still produced today, marked the first time the brand would create a product displaying the brand logo, in this case a buckle in the shape of a "D" letter.

When Franz Schwennicke died in 1970, his wife Solange succeeded him, focusing on strengthening the creativity and expanding internationally. A light holdall model, the "Le Pin" was introduced to meet the needs of the new generation of career women who were looking for larger handbags to carry their accessories and personal effects.

In 1988, a second workshop opened to meet rising demand, this time in Bourg-Argental, France.

At the end of the 80s, François Schwennicke, the eldest son of Franz and Solange, became Executive Chairman.

In 1994, the headquarters were moved back to Brussels, this time to the former arsenal of the Belgian Army on Boulevard Louis Schmidt. L'Arsenal was designed by Henri van Dievoet, a Belgian architect strongly inspired by Art Nouveau.

The 180th anniversary of Delvaux was celebrated in 2009 and that milestone became the title of a book by Judah Hettie and Véronique Pouillard and the title of an exhibition at the Fashion Museum of Antwerp.

In 2011, the investment arm of the Fung Group, First Heritage Brands, took a majority stake in the company with the ambition to further grow it internationally.

In 2021, the company was acquired by the Swiss conglomerate, Compagnie Financiere Richemont S.A.

== Boutiques ==
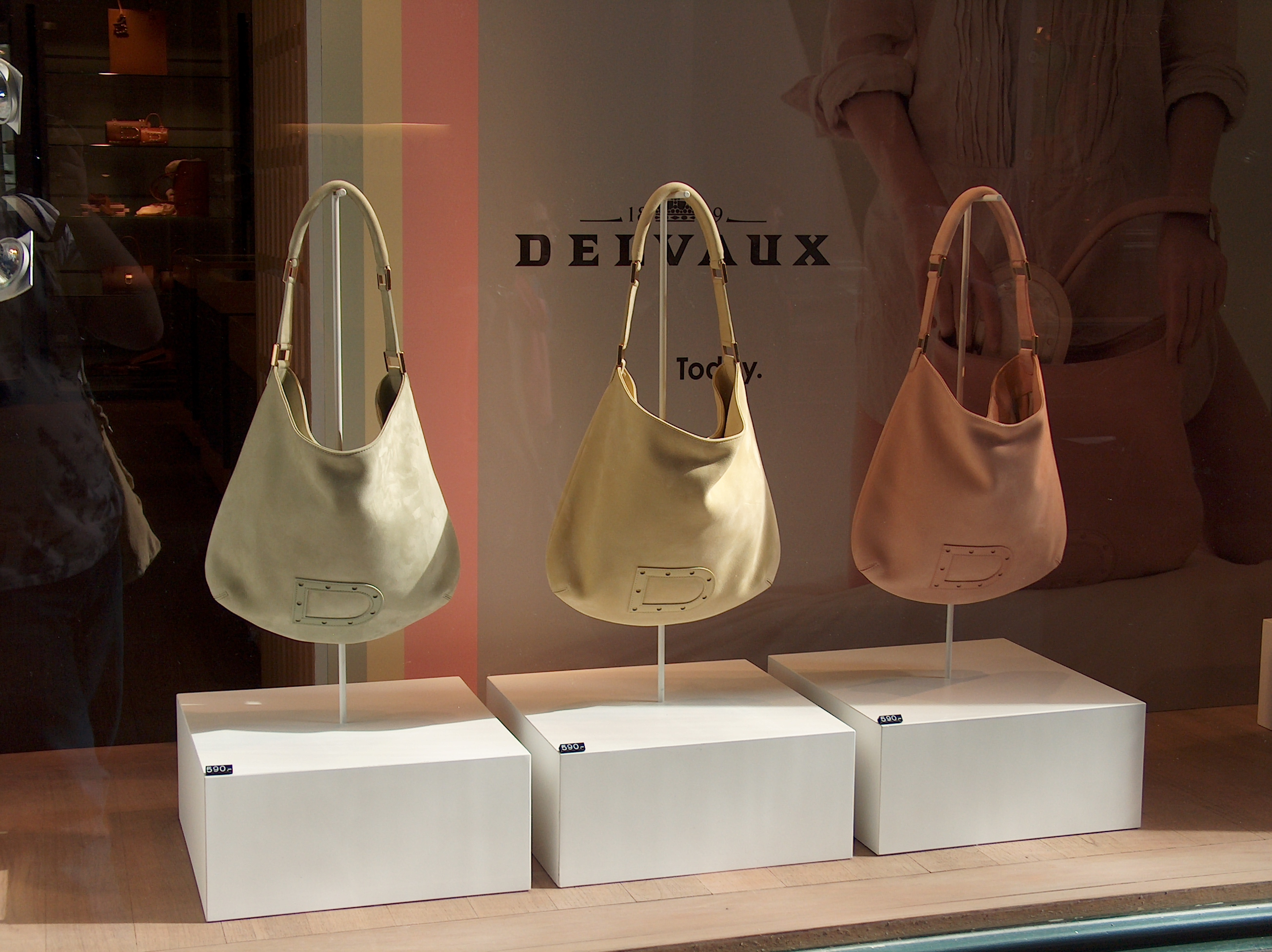
Delvaux boutique in Brussels

Delvaux operates about 10 stores in Belgium with its flagship boutique being "Le 27" at 27, Boulevard de Waterloo in Brussels, Belgium.

In 2014, Delvaux opened its first international flagship boutiques in Paris, Tokyo and London. In 2018 Delvaux opened a second boutique in London on Sloane Street, as well as its first boutique in Italy, in Milan.

In January 2019 Delvaux opened its first American flagship in New York City, on Fifth Avenue and 59th Street, on Manhattan's Upper East Side. The boutique is situated in the Sherry-Netherland building.

Delvaux operates 42 stores in the world, including doors in Belgium, England, Italy, the United States, China and Japan.

It is otherwise distributed through specialty and department stores in Australia, Austria, China, France, Germany, Hong Kong, Italy, Japan, Korea, Kuwait, Lebanon, Portugal, Russia, Spain, Taiwan, United Kingdom and the United States.
