= Buccellati =

Italian jewellery and watch company

Coordinates: 45.4626533°N 9.2074139°E

Buccellati Holding Italia S.p.A.

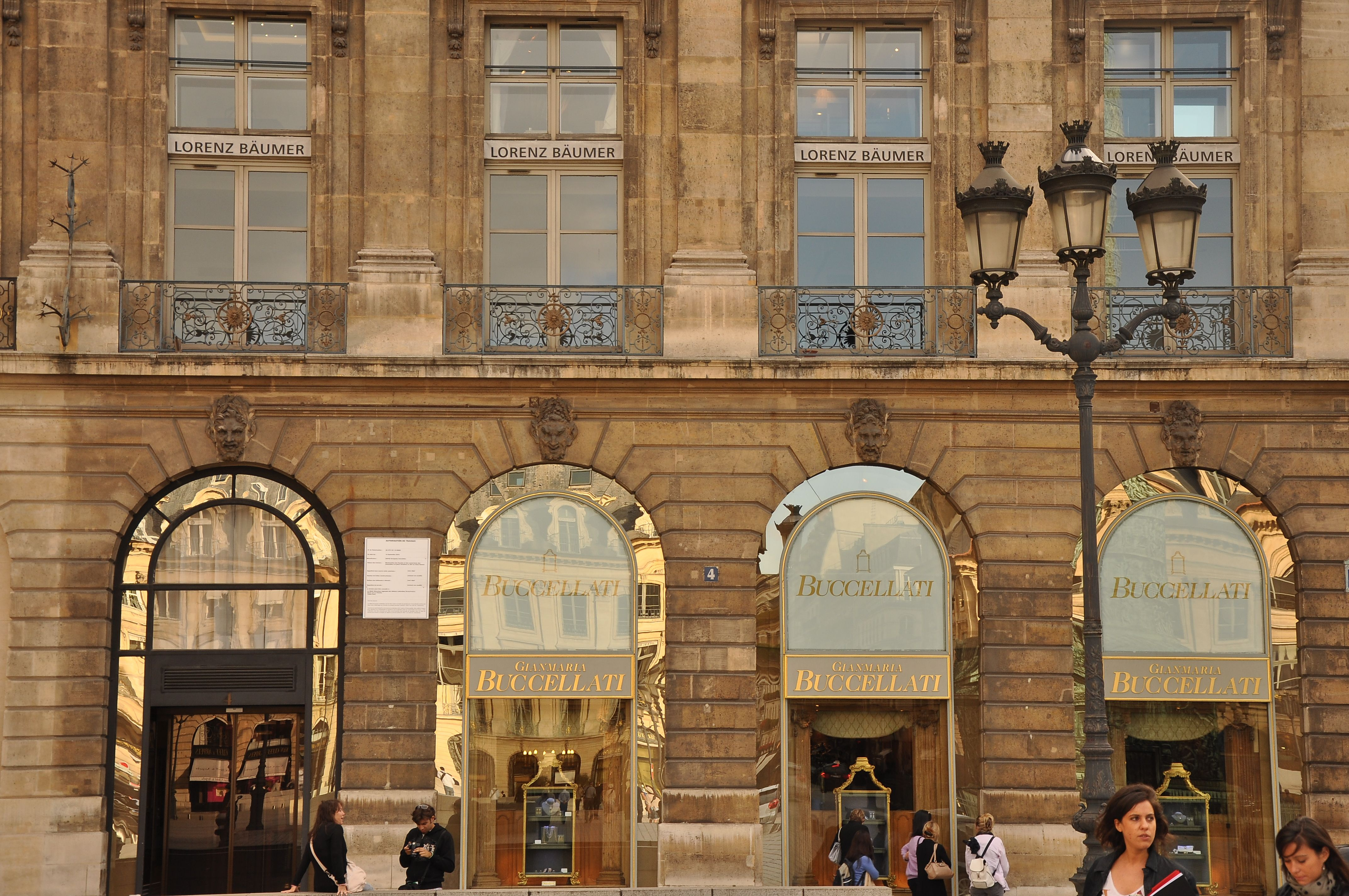
- Buccellati store at Place Vendôme in Paris
- Company type: Subsidiary
- Industry: Jewellery
- Founded: 1919 (original business); 2011 (current company)
- Founders: Mario Buccellati; Gianmaria Buccellati
- Parent: Richemont
- Website: www.buccellati.com

Buccellati Holding Italia S.p.A. is an Italian jewellery and watch company. It was formed in 2011 through the merger of two previous luxury brands, Mario Buccellati and Gianmaria Buccellati, the names of two master goldsmiths who were father and son. The company is a wholly owned subsidiary of the Swiss holding company Richemont.

== History ==
In 1919, Mario Buccellati opened his first enterprise. After the establishment of stores in Milan, Rome and Florence, he began the development of overseas business by opening a new store on Fifth Avenue in New York (in 1954) and another store on Worth Avenue in Palm Beach, Florida (in 1958). In 1949, Mario Buccellati was commissioned to create an icon by Pope Pius XII for Princess Margaret to mark the extraordinary event of the first visit by British royalty to Vatican City in hundreds of years. This work of art can be admired today at the Chianciano Art Museum in Tuscany.

In 1965, after the death of Mario, the management of the firm was conducted by four of his five sons. In 1971, the new brand Gianmuria Buccellati was launched by one of Mario's sons, who started a separate business from his brothers, and in 2011 came to an agreement with his relatives for the brand Buccellati, then Buccellati Holding Italia, reshaping the company.

Gianmaria Buccellati, son of founder Mario Buccellati, continued the family tradition by designing jewelry pieces that began as life-size drawings made by hand. His designs were often unique, with some produced in limited editions. His work drew inspiration from nature and Renaissance architecture, frequently incorporating elements such as baroque pearls and detailed hand-engraving, which gave the metal surfaces a fabric-like texture. These surface effects are associated with traditional engraving techniques including rigato, telato, ornato, and segrinato, used to create varied textures on gold and silver surfaces.

In December 2016, China's Gansu Gangtai Holding Group bought a controlling 85% share in Buccellati.

In September 2019, Compagnie Financière Richemont acquired 100% of Buccellati from Gangtai. In the same year, the Maison celebrated its hundredth anniversary since its foundation that took place in 1919 with the opening of the first boutique in Milan, Largo Santa Margherita, next to the famous La Scala Theatre. The acquisition did not have an impact on Richemont's operating results in that fiscal year.

== Expansion ==
Gianmaria Buccellati set up shops in Paris (on Place Vendôme), London, Moscow, Tokyo, Osaka, Nagoya, Hong Kong, Milan (on via Monte Napoleone), Costa Smeralda, Capri, Elba, Beverly Hills (on Rodeo Drive), Aspen and Sydney. He received several awards for his work as a goldsmith and entrepreneur.

In 2011, after the trade association of the brand's family, the company began to explore new markets. In 2013, the investment fund Clessidra took over the majority of the company's capital to further expand the business through owned shops showing only the label Buccellati.

== Bibliography ==
- Heritage Fine Jewelry & Timepieces by Jill Burgum, Katie Pierce Johnston and James L. Halperin
- Sylvia Luzzatto, Buccellati: arte senza tempo, 5 Continents Editions, 2008
- Martina Corgnati, Mario Buccellati: Prince of Goldsmiths, Rizzoli International Publications, Incorporated, 1999;
- Martina Corgnati, Mario Buccellati: storie di uomini e gioielli, Leonardo Arte, 1998
- Vincent-Emmanuel Ragot, Buccellati, Perseus Distribution Services, 2003
- Maria Cristina Buccellati, Buccellati: arte in oro, argento e gemme, Skira, 2000
- M. Mosco, Art of jewelry and artists' jewels in the 20th century, Giunti, 2001, pp. 20–21 and 168-179
- M. Amari, I musei delle aziende, FrancoAngeli, 2001, pp. 239–242
- A. Mazzuca, I numeri uno del made in Italy, Baldini Castoldi Dalai, 2005, pp. 66–67
- A. Testa, M. Garbuglia, Profilo Italia: Un Certo Stile Made in Italy, Berenice, 1990, pp. 150–153
- M. Di Lorenzo, "Da Roma a New York l'impero del Principe dei gioiellieri", in Il Parlamento italiano, VII (1959), n. 3–4, pp. 42 ss.;
- R. Bossaglia, "I gioielli di Gabriele D'Annunzio", in Bolaffi Arte, November 1977, n. 74, suppl., pp. 40–47
