= Gerrit Ferreira =

South African businessman

Gerrit Thomas Ferreira
- Born: 6 April 1948 (age 78)
- Education: University of Stellenbosch
- Occupation: Businessman
- Children: 2

Gerrit Thomas Ferreira also known as GT Ferreira is a South African billionaire businessman, investor and banker who is one of the founders of FirstRand Limited.

== Biography ==
Gerrit Ferreira got his MBA degree from University of Stellenbosch. In 1977, he co-founded FirstRand's predecessor, Rand Consolidated Investing along with Paul Harris and Lauritz Dippenaar. Previously, he served as MD of RMB Holdings between 1985 and 1988.
