= Momentum Group Limited =

Title changes

- Type: Public
- Traded as: JSE:MMH; A2X:MMH; NSX:MMH
- Industry: Insurance and financial services
- Founded: 2010; 16 years ago
- Headquarters: Centurion, City of Tshwane Metropolitan Municipality South Africa
- Key people: Paul Baloyi (Chairman); Jeanette Marais (CEO)
- Products: Insurance and asset management
- Revenue: ▲ZAR: 66.4 billion (2023)
- Net income: ▲ZAR: 4.9 billion (2023)
- Total assets: ▲ZAR: 636.8 billion (2023)
- Total equity: ▲ZAR: 27.2 billion (2023)
- Number of employees: 16,115 (2024)
- Website: momentumgroupltd.co.za

Momentum Group Limited (stylized and often referred to simply as momentum), is a South African financial services group that is listed on the Johannesburg Stock Exchange.

== History ==
In July 2019 MMI took the decision to change its name from MMI Holdings to Momentum Metropolitan Holdings. The change aims to promote the well-known brand names of two of the strongest companies within the Group, Momentum and Metropolitan.

MMI Holdings was formed in 2010 when Metropolitan Holdings and Momentum Group, two insurance and financial services companies in South Africa, merged their operations.

=== Pre-Merger ===
==== Metropolitan Holdings Limited ====
Metropolitan was founded in 1898 as Homes Trust Limited and was later acquired by Sanlam in 1918. Sanlam merged Homes Trust Limited with Metropolitan Life Insurance Company Limited (another one of its subsidiaries) to form Metropolitan Homes Trust Life Limited in 1979.

In 1985, Metropolitan Homes Trust Life Limited changed its name to Metropolitan Life Limited (Metlife). Metlife was then listed on the JSE in 1986 and cross listed on the NSX in 1996. The group name was changed to Metropolitan Holdings Limited in 2003. As at the merger date, Metropolitan Holdings was listed on the JSE.

==== Momentum Group Limited ====
Momentum traces its roots from Momentum Life Assurers Limited that was established in 1966 as a life assurance company and Southern Life Association Limited that was incorporated in 1904 as African Life Assurance Society. In 1992, RMB Holdings (RMBH) acquired interest in Momentum Life Assurers Limited.

On April 1, 1998, Anglo American Corporation of South Africa Limited (now Anglo American plc) merged its financial services interests with RMBH in order to achieve the objective of a unified financial services grouping known as First Rand. The transaction required that the business of Momentum Life Assurers Limited was transferred to the Southern Life Association Limited which was renamed FirstRand Insurance Company Limited and much later renamed Momentum Group Limited. As at the merger date, Momentum Group was a wholly owned subsidiary of First Rand.

In 2003, Momentum Group Limited transferred its investment in Discovery Limited to FirstRand Limited for R740 million. This stake was later on unbundled to FirstRand's shareholders including RMBH.

=== Merger ===
On March 31, 2010, Metropolitan Holdings, First Rand and Momentum Group entered into a Merger Agreement that would see the amalgamation of Momentum's business with Metropolitan. FirstRand sold its entire shareholding in Momentum to Metropolitan in consideration for which Metropolitan will issue new Metropolitan ordinary shares to FirstRand. This made Momentum a wholly owned subsidiary of Metropolitan. Metropolitan then transferred its insurance business to Momentum and was renamed MMI Holdings with FirstRand as the largest shareholder.

=== Post-merger ===
On 7 March 2011, RMB Holdings (RMBH), Remgro and FirstRand spun off their insurance assets to RMI Holdings and separately listing it on the JSE. This process led to the transfer of FirstRand's entire shareholding in MMI Holdings to RMI Holdings. In 2020, Momentum Group started a new business initiative, Momentum Velocity Club, which provides lifestyle and financial planning services to young professionals.

== Ownership ==
As at June 2023, the shareholding in the group's stock was as depicted in the table below:

Momentum Metropolitan Holdings Limited Stock Ownership
Rank	Name of Owner	Percentage Ownership
1	Government Employees Pension Fund	14.90
2	Remgro	8.50
3	Kagiso Tiso Holdings	7.90
4	Other Local & International Investors	68.70
	Total	100.00

== Controversies ==
=== Life insurance payout controversy ===
Momentum Group, a subsidiary of MMI Holdings, was the subject of a national controversy in 2018 when it rejected the life insurance claim to the family of Denise Ganas. Ganas was shot and killed in an attempted hijacking. Momentum controversially refused to payout the R2.4 million claim arguing that Ganas had a previously undisclosed health condition (high blood sugar levels).

The resulting public outcry resulted in Momentum granting the claim to Ganas' family and discussions with the South African Financial Sector Conduct Authority so as to avoid similar situations in the future. Momentum agreed to amend its policy to payout life insurance claims up to R3 million resulting from violent crime regardless of pre-existing medical conditions.

== See also ==
- Discovery Limited
- OUTsurance Holdings
- Rand Merchant Investment Holdings
- First Rand
- Remgro
- JSE Limited
