= Jean-Marc Loubier =

Jean-Marc Loubier is chief executive officer (CEO) of Delvaux (company), a Belgian manufacturer of leather luxury goods owned by Richemont. He was formerly the CEO of Escada, an international luxury fashion group. He succeeded Frank Rheinboldt. Jean-Marc Loubier worked at LVMH for 16 years, including 10 years as executive vice president of Louis Vuitton. From 2000-2006 he was CEO of Celine, a Paris-based clothing maker, owned by LVMH.

Together with Yves Carcelle, Jean-Marc Loubier (l'homme de fer de Delvaux) starts the City Guide Louis Vuitton in 1997.
