= OUTsurance Group =

South African insurance company

- Formerly: Rand Merchant Investment Holdings
- Type: Public
- Industry: Insurance; Financial services
- Founded: 28 February 1998; 28 years ago
- Founder: Willem Roos; Howard Aron and René Otto
- Headquarters: Centurion, Gauteng, South Africa
- Area served: South Africa; Australia; Ireland
- Key people: Herman Bosman (Chairman); Marthinus Visser (CEO)
- Revenue: ▲ R37.13 billion (2025)
- Operating income: ▲ R6.05 billion (2025)
- Net income: ▲ R4.71 billion (2025)
- Total assets: ▲ R38.65 billion (2025)
- Total equity: ▲ R15.94 billion (2025)
- Number of employees: 8,162 (2025)
- Subsidiaries: OUTsurance Holdings (92.83%)
- Website: outsurance.co.za

OUTsurance Group is a South African holding company in the insurance industry.

Founded in 1998 and headquartered in Centurion, Gauteng, the company is listed on the JSE. OUTsurance offers a variety of personal and corporate insurance products in South Africa, Australia, and Ireland.

== History ==
OUTsurance was founded in February 1998 by Willem Roos, Howard Aron, and René Otto, to provide short-term personal insurance. Originally, it was a wholly owned subsidiary of RMB Holdings.

In January 2000, OUTsurance acquired the First National Insurance group (FNI) from FirstRand in an all share deal that gave RMBH and FirstRand each an interest of 47.5% in the merged entity, with 5% being held by the staff trust. As a result of its shareholding in FirstRand, RMBH had 59.4% control in OUTsurance.

In 2006, OUTsurance expand into Namibia, in partnership with FNB Namibia.

In 2008, OUTsurance launched insurance company Youi in Australia.

In 2010, the group launched OUTsurance Life, offering basic and fully underwritten life insurance products in South Africa.

On 7 March 2011, RMB Holdings, Remgro and FirstRand Corporate spun off their insurance assets to RMI Holdings, making OUTsurance Holding a subsidiary of RMI Holdings.

In July 2014, OUTsurance launched its Youi insurance brand in New Zealand, as a subsidiary of Youi Australia. The company was sold to New Zealand entity Tower Insurance in September 2019.

In 2016, OUTsurance began investigating the possibility of opening its own bank in South Africa. The following year, the company acquired the team that helped build TymeBank (now GoTymeBank). At the time, TymeBank had just ended its partnership with mobile network operator MTN, which had used Tyme as a mobile money distribution platform since 2012.

By 2018, OUTsurance had decided against opening a bank, but still wanted to monetize the banking asset it had developed in house, known as CloudBadger. South Africa's largest commercial bank by annual revenue, Standard Bank, was at the time looking for tech to facilitate payments for its African Regions business. It purchased a 45% shareholding in CloudBadger. Another 45% remained with OUTsurance, and the remaining 10% with the management of CloudBadger.

In May 2024, OUTsurance Ireland was launched, offering short-term insurance.

In 2025, major South African retail holding company Pepkor announced that it had agreed to purchase CloudBadger outright, to enable the launch of the retailer's new bank, codenamed PlusB. The deal was worth R206 million upfront, with an additional R100 million over four years, provided certain conditions are met. It is understood that OUTsurance's outgoing CFO, Jan Hofmeyr, will be joining the new bank.

In October 2026, OUTsurance Group announced that it had reached a deal to acquire the remaining 7.17% shareholding from the minority shareholders of Outsurance Holdings. At the time, Outsurance Holdings contained the majority of assets relating to the group's insurance and administrative operations. The transaction was valued at around R10.16 billion, and was still, subject to regulatory approval.

== Structure ==
As of the group's 2025 financial statements, subsidiaries of OUTsurance Group include:

- OUTsurance Holdings Limited
- OUTsurance Insurance Company Limited
- OUTsurance Life Insurance Company Limited
- Youi Holdings Proprietary Limited
- OUTsurance Designated Activity Company
