= Prodigy Finance =

British fintech

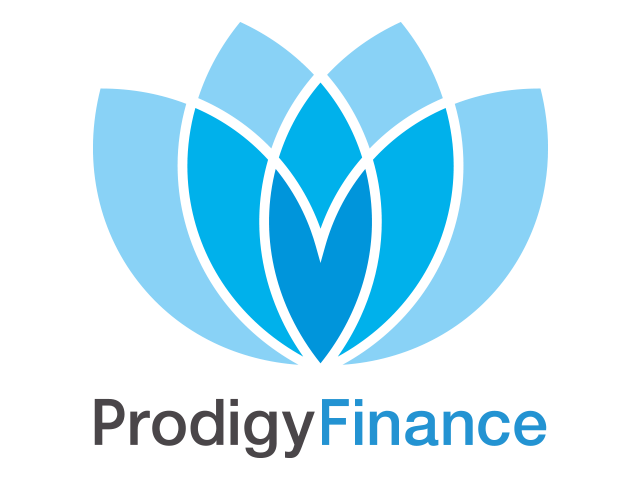
- Type: Private
- Industry: Finance
- Founded: August 2007; 19 years ago
- Founder: Cameron Stevens
- Headquarters: London, United Kingdom
- Key people: Cameron Stevens (CEO)
- Services: Postgraduate student loans
- Website: prodigyfinance.com

Prodigy Finance is a fintech company that develops a platform enabling financing for international postgraduate students who attend a participating postgraduate institution.

The company's loans are funded by a community of alumni, institutional investors, and private investors. The company finances postgraduate programs in the fields of business, engineering, public policy, law, and health sciences.

Since 2007, Prodigy Finance has disbursed over US$1.4 billion through its platform, to fund over 20,000 students across 150 different nationalities. The company is headquartered in London, and maintains offices in Cape Town and New York.

== History ==
The company was conceptualized in 2006, by Three INSEAD MBA students.

That same year, the company's concept was recognized at INSEAD's International Venture Capital Investment Competition, resulting in the initial seed funding for the company.

Prodigy Finance was officially founded in 2007.

Prodigy Finance started with a peer-to-peer funding programme for INSEAD students. Alumni invested in bonds which enabled students to study their MBA at that institution. Leveraging this peer-to-peer lending, Prodigy Finance began offering loans to MBA candidates enrolled at other business schools.

In 2014, Prodigy Finance announced the launch of a US$25 million Education Note in partnership with the Credit Suisse Impact Investing and Microfinance team. The Education Note has a focus on students from emerging markets, enabling them to study at top postgraduate programmes.

In 2015, Prodigy Finance announced a $12.5 million equity investment from Balderton Capital and various angel investors, and $110 million in loan capital from Credit Suisse, Deutsche Bank and other private investors.

In 2017, Prodigy Finance announced a $240 million fundraise. This included a $40 million Series C equity round led by international venture capital firm Index Ventures, with participation from Balderton Capital and AlphaCode; and a $200 million debt facility led by a global investment bank.
