= Remgro =

Investment holding company

Remgro Limited
- Type: Public
- Traded as: JSE: REM
- Industry: Conglomerate
- Founded: 12 July 1968; 58 years ago as Rembrandt S.A. Limited (Remsa)
- Headquarters: Stellenbosch, South Africa
- Key people: Johann Rupert (Chairman); Jannie Durand (CEO)
- Net income: ▲ZAR: 8.71 billion (2015)
- Total assets: ▲ZAR: 94.69 billion (2015)
- Total equity: ▲ZAR: 75.93 billion (2015)
- Number of employees: 173
- Website: https://www.remgro.com

Remgro Limited is a South African investment holding company, based in Stellenbosch.

The company has interests in banking, financial services, packaging, glass products, medical services, mining, petroleum, beverage, food and personal care products, and is listed on the Johannesburg Stock Exchange.

In 2015, Forbes listed Remgro as the 9th largest publicly traded company in South Africa and 1,436th largest in the world.

== History ==
Remgro traces its roots from Voorbrand Tobacco Company (renamed Rembrandt Trust in 1948) that was founded in the 1940s by Anton Rupert.

Remgro was incorporated in 1968 as Rembrandt S.A. Limited (Remsa), a wholly owned subsidiary of JSE listed Rembrandt Group.

In 2000, the Rembrandt Group of companies underwent a corporate restructure that led to the consolidation of the group's investments from four to two publicly traded holding companies i.e. Remgro and VenFin. VenFin acquired the group's technology-orientated assets while Remgro acquired the traditional assets. After the spin-off of the BAT stake in 2008, Remgro and VenFin were merged again in 2009.

== Portfolio ==
Remgro Limited is one of the largest companies in Africa by market value and is therefore included in the 2008 S&P Africa 40 Index. Remgro's portfolio of investments include but are not limited to the following:

=== FMCG ===
- Unilever South Africa – 25.8% shareholding – A manufacturer and marketer of food, home and personal care products. A subsidiary of Unilever.
- Distell Group – 30.65% shareholding – A producer and marketer of fine wines, spirits and flavoured alcoholic beverages. Listed on the JSE and held indirectly through Capevin Holdings and related investments.
- RCL Foods – 77.5% shareholding – A holding company for diversified food businesses including Rainbow Chicken, Foodcorp, TSB Sugar, Zam Chick and logistics firm Vector Logistics.

=== Banking ===
- RMB Holdings – 28.2% shareholding – An investment holding company.
- FirstRand – 13.5% shareholding – A banking and financial service company with operations in South Africa and across Africa. Trading under the Rand Merchant Bank (RMB), First National Bank (FNB), WesBank and Ashburton Investments brands. This investment is held both directly and through RMB Holdings.

=== Healthcare ===
- Mediclinic – 42% shareholding – A provider of comprehensive, high-quality hospital services in Southern Africa, the United Arab Emirates and Switzerland. Mediclinic holds a 29.9% stake in UK based Spire Healthcare.

=== Industrial ===
- Air Products South Africa (APSA) – 50% shareholding – A producer of oxygen, nitrogen, argon, hydrogen and carbon dioxide for industrial use. APSA is a joint venture between Remgro and US based Air Products and Chemicals Incorporated.
- Kagiso Tiso Holding (KTH) – 34.9% shareholding – A black economic controlled company with a focus on investment banking services, media and strategic investments.
- Total South Africa – 24.9% shareholding – A marketer of petroleum and petroleum products in South Africa. Total South Africa is a subsidiary of Total SA.
- PGSI – 37.7% shareholding – An investment holding company holding a 90% stake in PG Group. PG Group is South Africa's leading manufacturer, distributor and installer of high-performance automotive and building glass products.
- Wispeco Holding – 100% shareholding – A manufacturer and distributor of extruded aluminium used in the building, engineering and durable goods sectors.

=== Insurance ===
- RMI Holdings – 30.3% shareholding – A listed investment entity holding interests in Discovery Limited, MMI Holdings, OUTsurance and RMB Structured Insurance.

=== Infrastructure ===
- Grindrod – 23% shareholding – A JSE listed logistics holding company.
- Community Investments Ventures Holdings (CIV Holdings) – 50.9% shareholding – An investment holding company with Dark Fibre Africa (DFA) as its major investments. DFA builds, owns, maintains and monitors infrastructure suitable to carry services such as fibre-optic networks.
- SEACOM – 25% shareholding – A provider high-capacity international fibre-optic bandwidth for Southern and East Africa.
- Kagiso Infrastructure Empowerment Fund (KIEF) – 45.4% shareholding – A fund investing in infrastructure projects.
- Community Investment Ventures Holdings (CIVH) - 54% shareholding - An owner of South African fiber internet infrastructure providers Vumatel and Dark Fiber Africa (DFA).

=== Media and sport ===
- Sabido Investments – 32.4% shareholding – A media holding company with investments in e.tv, eNews Channel Africa (eNCA), free-to-air satellite platform Platco Digital, Yfm and various studio facilities and production businesses.

=== Other investments ===
- Business Partners – 42.7% shareholding – A specialist investment company providing customized and integrated investments, mentorship and property management services to SMEs.
- Capevin Holdings – 15.6% shareholding – An investment holding company with Distell Group as its only investments.

== Ownership ==
Remgro's stock are divided into two classes, i.e. ordinary shares and B ordinary shares. The ordinary shares are listed on the JSE under the “Industrials – Diversified Industrials” sector, with the share code: REM. The B ordinary shares are all owned by Rembrandt Group. As of 30 June 2015, this structure gave Rembrandt Group 42.57% control of Remgro while Public Investment Corporation has 9.63% control.

As of 2024, retail investors have 45% ownership in the company, while institutions own 29% of the company. 50% of the business is held by the top 23 shareholders.

== Governance ==
Remgro is governed by a twelve-person Board of Directors with Johann Rupert serving as the chairman of the group and Jannie Durand as the CEO.

== See also ==
- Anton Rupert
- Rembrandt Group
- Richemont
- Reinet Investments
- Rothmans International
- List of companies traded on the JSE
