= Watchfinder =

British luxury watch dealer

Watchfinder & Co.
- Company type: Subsidiary
- Industry: Online retail
- Founded: 2002 in United Kingdom
- Founders: Stuart Hennell; Lloyd Amsdon
- Headquarters: Kings Hill, UK
- Services: Resale of timepieces
- Revenue: £68 million, GBP (2016)
- Number of employees: 200+
- Parent: Richemont
- Website: www.watchfinder.com

Watchfinder & Co. is an online retailer of second-hand watches based in Kings Hill, United Kingdom. It is the UK's largest seller of second-hand watches.

== History ==
By 2015, watches sold through the site totalled £155 million, and annual turnover was £68 million in financial year 2015-16. Online traffic amounts to around 6.7m unique visitors per year, putting it among the highest rates for any horological website.

In addition, the brand is notable for several innovations in the industry:

- It was the first UK website dedicated to the online sale of second-hand watches when it started in 2002.
- It was the first retailer to offer a "buy-back guarantee", in which the company refunds the cost of a watch if returned in good condition after two years.
- It services and repairs at least 600 watches per month in-house.
- It publishes an online magazine, The Watch Magazine. Published quarterly, it has been downloaded more than 100,000 times.

Watchfinder has been recognised for business success by several industry awards and is an alumnus of the Sunday Times Fast Track 100.

The company was purchased by Richemont in 2018.
