= Johann Rupert =

South African businessman (born 1950)

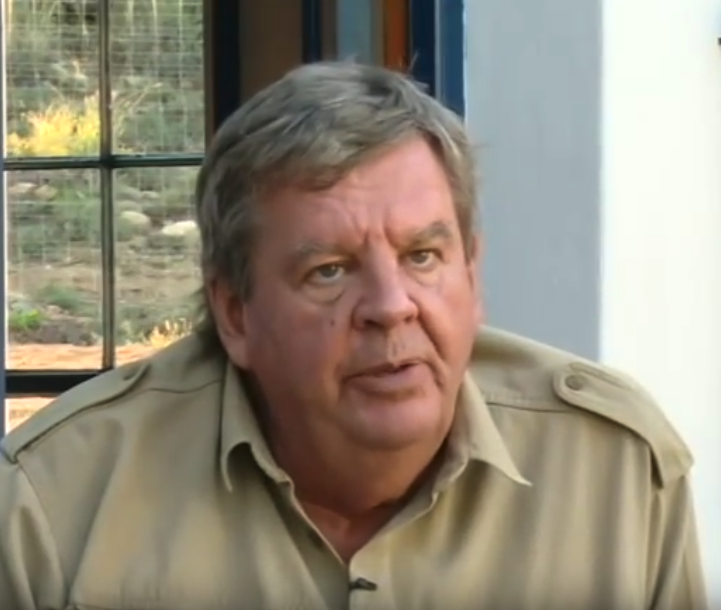

Chancellor of Stellenbosch University
- In office November 2009 – December 2019

Chairman of Compagnie Financière Richemont SA
- Incumbent
- Assumed office 2000

Executive Chairman of Remgro and Reinet Investments S. C. A.
- Incumbent
- Assumed office 2002

Personal details
- Born: Johann Peter Rupert; 1 June 1950 (age 76) Stellenbosch, South Africa
- Spouse: Gaynor Rupert
- Children: 3
- Parent(s): Anton Rupert and Huberte Rupert
- Education: Stellenbosch University
- Occupation: Founder and Chairman of Compagnie Financiere Richemont
- Profession: Businessman

Johann Peter Rupert (born 1 June 1950) is a South African billionaire businessman, who is the eldest son of business tycoon Anton Rupert and his wife Huberte. He is the chairman of the Swiss-based luxury goods company Richemont and the South Africa-based company Remgro.

He has previously CEO of Compagnie Financiere Richemont. Rupert and family were ranked the second richest in South Africa; behind Elon Musk; on the 2025 Forbes list, with an estimated net worth of US$16.3 billion, or $19.3 billion according to the Bloomberg Billionaires Index.

== Personal life ==
Rupert grew up in Stellenbosch, where he attended Paul Roos Gymnasium and the University of Stellenbosch, studying economics and company law. He dropped out of the university to pursue a career in business, however, in 2004, the university awarded him an honorary doctorate in economics.

In 2008, he was awarded an honorary doctorate from Nelson Mandela Metropolitan University. Described as "reclusive" by the Financial Times and Barron's, Rupert rarely gives interviews and shuns public events. He is nicknamed "Rupert the Bear".

Rupert has declared his sympathy for and belief in the idea of a universal basic income.

== Business career ==
Rupert started his career in New York City, where he worked for Chase Manhattan for two years and Lazard Freres for three years. He then returned to South Africa in 1979 and founded Rand Merchant Bank of which he was CEO.

- 1984: Merged RMB and Rand Consolidated Investments, forming RMB Holdings, and left to join his father's company, the Rembrandt Group.
- 1988 Founded Compagnie Financiere Richemont and was appointed Non-Executive Director of Rothmans International plc.
- 1989: Appointed Vice Chairman of the Rembrandt Group.
- 1990: Formed Richemont subsidiary Vendôme Luxury Group SA.
- 1991: Appointed Chairman of Rembrandt Group Limited.
- 1997: Appointed Non-Executive Chairman of Gold Fields South Africa Ltd.
- 2000: Restructured Rembrandt Group Limited and formed Remgro Limited and VenFin Limited. Appointed Chairman and Chief Executive of Compagnie Financière Richemont SA.

In May 2025, Rupert was part of the South African delegation that accompanied President Cyril Ramaphosa to the White House, to meet with United States President Donald Trump. The meeting, attended by South African politicians, businesspeople, and athletes, was arranged (at the request of Ramaphosa) to attempt to reset SA-US relations, following some diplomatic issues. The meeting was generally deemed a success by the South African government.

== Other interests ==
Rupert is a former cricketer and founded the Laureus Sport for Good Foundation in 1990. Laureus funds 65 projects globally, with the goal of using sport to tackle social issues, having a particular emphasis on underprivileged children. He co-founded the Sports Science Institute with his friends Morne du Plessis and Tim Noakes. Rupert also developed the Gary Player designed, Leopard Creek Golf Club in Mpumalanga, South Africa which is one of South Africa's top three golf courses, and rated number 25 outside the United States of America (Golf Digest). He has also played in the annual Gary Player Invitational golf tournament to assist fellow South African and friend Gary Player raise funds for various children's charities. He is chairman of the South African PGA Tour and Chairman of the South African Golf Development Board. In 2007, he was elected into South African Sports Hall of Fame and in 2009 was inducted into the South African Golf Hall of Fame.

In 2008, Rupert bought a 50% stake in English Premiership Rugby club Saracens through his Remgro company. In 2018, having won three premiership titles and two Champions Cups, Rupert sold his stake to chairman Nigel Wray.

Following his younger brother Anthonij's death in a car accident in 2001 he took over the L'Ormarins wine estate. Anthonij was head of Rupert & Rothschild Vignerons. Rupert initiated a project to enhance the farm in memory of his late brother.

He was council member of the South Africa Foundation and trustee of the Southern African Nature Foundation, The Institute of Directors in Southern Africa, Business South Africa and Die Suid-Afrikaanse Akademie vir Wetenskap en Kuns and Managing Trustee and member of the investment committee, Nelson Mandela Children's Fund. He was on the Daimler Chrysler International Advisory Board.

Following in the footsteps of his father Anton, Rupert is also a conservationist. In addition to conserving about 25,000 hectares in the Graaff Reinet area, he is chairman of the Peace Parks Foundation.

== Controversies ==
When the British design magazine Wallpaper* described the Afrikaans language as "one of the ugliest languages in the world" in its September 2005 edition (in reference to the Afrikaans Language Monument), Rupert responded by withdrawing advertising for his companies' brands such as Cartier, Van Cleef & Arpels, Montblanc and Alfred Dunhill from the magazine.

In December 2016, it was reported that Rupert had dropped Bell Pottinger as the PR agency of Richemont, accusing Bell Pottinger of running a social media campaign against him, to divert attention away from persistent 'state capture' allegations levelled at the Gupta family. Interpol has issued red notices against Atul and Rajesh Gupta — two of the three Indian-origin Gupta brothers — who fled South Africa with their families amid investigations into their alleged looting of billions of rands from state-owned enterprises.

In September 2017, Rupert, during Richemont’s annual general meeting in Geneva, described the use of the term "Radical Economic Transformation" by Bell Pottinger as "just a code word for theft”, in order to cover up the "state capture" by their clients, the notorious Gupta family. Radical Economic Transformation is a policy championed by President Jacob Zuma to reduce racial inequality in South Africa.

In 2018, Rupert caused some controversy in South Africa for comments he made during an interview with PowerFM. He was criticised for denying the alleged existence of white monopoly capital, his account of the process of Afrikaner economic upliftment, and for comments he made regarding the saving habits of black South Africans. Following the incident, Rupert issued an apology for his comments. The controversial leader of the Black First Land First party Andile Mngxitama stated afterwards that Rupert's comments were a reason to commit violence against white South Africans.

== Notable international appearances ==
In May 2025, Rupert was part of the South African delegation that accompanied President Cyril Ramaphosa to the White House to meet with Donald Trump. The bilateral meeting, attended by South African politicians, businesspeople, and athletes, was arranged (at the request of Ramaphosa) to attempt to reset SA-US relations, which had become strained since the commencement of the second Trump administration. During the meeting, Rupert responded to Trump's false claims regarding the alleged genocide of South Africa's white minority by referring to widespread crime in South Africa, saying, "We have too many deaths, and it’s across the board; it’s not only white farmers".

== Honours ==
- 1988 Named "Businessman of the Year" by the Sunday Times.
- 1990: Named business leader of the year by Die Burger newspaper and the Cape Town Chamber of Commerce.
- 1992: Named one of 200 "Global Leaders of Tomorrow" by the World Economic Forum, Davos, Switzerland.
- 1993: Received the M.S. Louw Award from the A.H.I. ("Afrikaanse Handelsinstituut").
- 1996: Named Sunday Times Business Times's Businessman of the Year for second time.
- 1999: Awarded the 1999 Free Market Award by The Free Market Foundation of South Africa.
- 2000: Voted "Most influential Business Leader" in South Africa by CEOs of top 100 Listed Companies
- 2004: Awarded an Honorary Doctorate in Economics by the University of Stellenbosch.
- 2008 Voted South Africa's Business Leader of the Year by the CEOs of the Top 100 Companies, for the third time.
- 2009 Appointed "Officier" of the French "Ordre National de la Légion d’Honneur" by the President of the French Republic

Selected as the 2009 International Wine Entrepreneur of the Year at the Meininger "Excellence in Wine and Spirit" awards ceremony in Düsseldorf, Germany.

- 2009: Appointed Chancellor of Stellenbosch University
- 2010 Made Honorary Vice President of the European Golf Tour

Awarded honorary doctorate by the University of St Andrews, Scotland

== See also ==
- List of South African billionaires by net worth
