= Rembrandt Group =

Industrial conglomerate

- Company type: Private
- Industry: Conglomerate
- Predecessor: Voorbrand Tobacco Company
- Founded: 1940s established as (Voorbrand Tobacco company), 1948 (renamed as Rembrandt)
- Founder: Anton Rupert
- Headquarters: Johannesburg, South Africa
- Area served: Worldwide
- Key people: Johann Rupert
- Products: Tobacco Products, Fashion accessory, Wine, Spirits etc
- Owner: Rupert Family

The Rembrandt Group, officially known as Rembrandt Trust (Proprietary) Limited, is a South African tobacco and industrial conglomerate founded by tycoon Anton Rupert who oversaw its eventual transition to the industrial and luxury branded goods sectors. Rembrandt was split into Remgro (an investment company with financial, mining and industrial interests) and Richemont (a Swiss-based luxury goods group).

== History ==
Rupert launched the group in 1948 when he was working as a chemistry lecturer at the University of Pretoria, purchased two small cigarette-making machines, and was granted a concession to sell cigarettes.

Rupert originally established the tobacco company "Voorbrand" in the 1940s. He soon renamed it Rembrandt Ltd. The first Rembrandt cigarettes were manufactured in an old flour mill in Paarl. Four years later Rupert introduced the world to the first king-sized cigarette filter. It was a wild success and it was on the back of this and a R1,5 million loan from Sanlam that Rembrandt's vast overseas empire was built. In 1968, it incorporated Remgro as an investment holding company with interests in financial, mining and industrial interests.

By 1972, the group was producing 1/15 of all cigarettes sold worldwide. However, the group's international subsidiaries were not consolidated, nor were the group's financial results. Rothmans International was created in 1972 to engage that consolidation. It created the fifth largest producer of cigarettes worldwide. The cash generated from the sale of tobacco was invested to diversify the group's assets (mining and metals, energy and banking). The group sold its US tobacco assets, Liggett, in 1978. Profit from tobacco and liquor dropped from 84.4% in 1979 to 72% in 1980, when the group still operated 64 cigarette factories in 26 countries.

Rupert's group had also created a development bank with the Union Bank of Switzerland which financed loans and investments in 19 African countries.

In 1988, the Rembrandt group founded the Swiss luxury goods company, Richemont, which in turn acquired Rembrandt's shares in Rothmans. Richemont also owns such luxury brands as Cartier (jewellery); Alfred Dunhill and Sulka (designer clothing); Seeger (leather bags); Piaget, Baume & Mercier and Vacheron Constantin (Swiss watches) and Montblanc (pens). In 1995 Rembrandt and Richemont consolidated their respective tobacco interests into Rothmans International, which was at the time the world's fourth largest cigarette manufacturer. In 1999, Rothmans International was acquired by British American Tobacco for $7.5 billion.
