= Diamond Standard =

Diamond Standard, Inc.
- Type: Private
- Industry: E-commerce
- Founded: 2018
- Founder: Cormac Kinney (CEO & Founder)
- Headquarters: New York City, United States
- Area served: Worldwide
- Products: Diamond Standard Coin; Diamond Standard Bar; Bitcarbon token
- Website: diamondstandard.co

Diamond Standard is the producer of an exchange-traded, regulated diamond commodity. Equivalent to a standard gold bar for the diamond market, the diamond coin and bar enables investors to access an estimated $1.2 trillion asset class. Futures contracts are in development by CFTC-licensees, and an investment trust launched in 2022.

== Products ==
The coin and bar are physical, and each contains a standardized set of diamonds, graded and certified by the Gemological Institute of America. The diamonds are acquired using an automated market-making and statistical sampling process. The geological details of the diamonds are stored on a public blockchain.

The commodity makes diamonds accessible to fund managers because the commodity is marked-to-market daily. While the commodity is held by custodians, the asset is traded using a regulator-licensed blockchain token. The diamond coin and bar contain an embedded wireless encryption chip. The chip provides auditing and authentication and stores the blockchain token, which can be transacted electronically.

The Diamond Standard Coin offerings are regulated by the Bermuda Monetary Authority and audited by Deloitte. Diamond Standard and the Bitcarbon token are among the first services to launch under Bermuda's recently enacted Digital Asset Business Act. To supply the commodity, the company also formed the Diamond Standard Exchange. All diamonds contained in the commodity are priced and acquired via transparent bidding on this exchange.

== History ==
The company was founded in 2018 by Cormac Kinney, a software designer and serial entrepreneur. The company was founded in New York City and has offices in Hamilton, Bermuda, the domicile of its regulator.
