= Peter Millar (clothing company) =

American clothing company

- Type: Private
- Industry: Apparel
- Founded: 2001; 25 years ago
- Founder: Chris Knott, Greg Oakley, Chet Sikorsky
- Headquarters: Raleigh, North Carolina, U.S.
- Number of locations: 17 stores
- Area served: Worldwide
- Key people: Scott Mahoney (CEO); Scott Ruerup; (President of Retail); Todd Martin; (President of Golf)
- Products: Apparel, Footwear, Accessories
- Number of employees: 240
- Parent: Richemont
- Website: petermillar.com

Peter Millar is an American clothing brand founded in 2001 in Raleigh, North Carolina, that produces sportswear and golf attire. Its studio and design is headquartered in Raleigh and its business operations are based in Durham, North Carolina. The company is a subsidiary of Richemont.

== History ==
Peter Millar was founded in 2001 by Greg Oakley, Chet Sikorski, and Chris Knott.

In 2005, Scott Mahoney and Sea Island Company purchased Peter Millar and named Mahoney as CEO.

In 2007, Peter Millar signed a license agreement with Empire Clothing of Canada for the manufacturing and distribution of Peter Millar's tailored clothing line.

In 2009, Winona Capital Management, a Chicago-based private equity firm, purchased a majority interest in Peter Millar from the Sea Island Company.

In January 2010, Todd Martin was named president of Peter Millar Golf.

In 2011, Peter Millar moved its design and marketing headquarters to Raleigh, North Carolina, and opened a warehouse space and offices in Durham, North Carolina.

== Growth ==
In 2012, Peter Millar was acquired by Richemont SA, a Swiss-based luxury goods holding company.

In March 2015, founder Chris Knott announced his retirement.

In February 2015, Jason Cater became vice-president of Design and Merchandising.

January 2018, Peter Millar acquired Los Angeles-based G/FORE, a golf sportswear and accessories brand.

== Stores ==
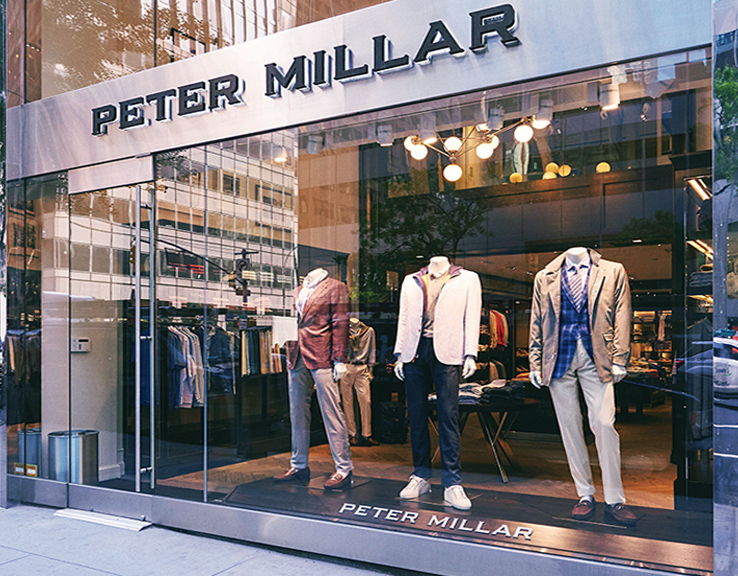
Peter Millar store on Madison Avenue in New York City

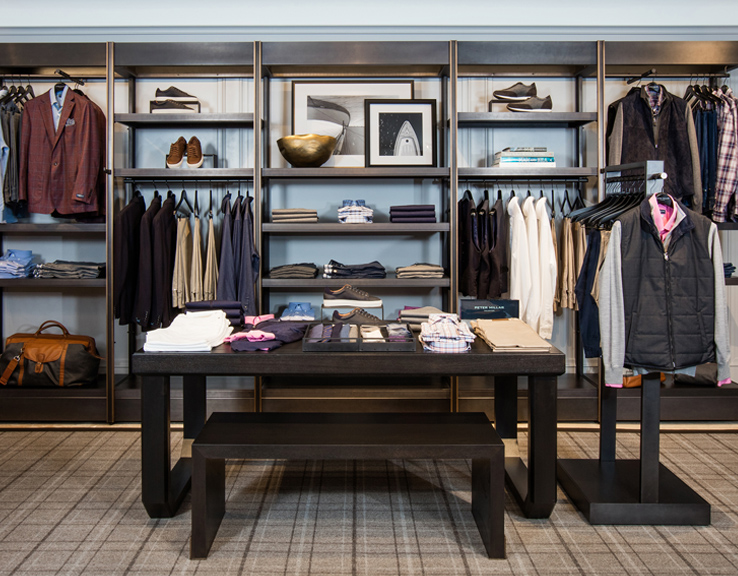
Men's clothing at Peter Millar store in Sea Island, Georgia

In 2011, Peter Millar opened its first company-owned retail store in Southampton, New York, followed by a retail store in Palm Beach, Florida, on Worth Avenue.

In late 2014, Peter Millar opened a retail store in New York at 536 Madison Avenue. Shortly afterward, it opened a retail store at The Domain Shopping Center in Austin, Texas.

In September 2015, Peter Millar opened a store in Raleigh's North Hills.

In December 2015, Peter Millar opened a store in partnership with Andrisen Morton in Denver.

In January 2016, Peter Millar opened a store in Atlanta at the Avalon Shopping Center.

In June 2017, Peter Millar opened a location in Dallas.

In August 2017, Peter Millar opened a new location in Brentwood's Hill Center.

In September 2017, Peter Millar opened a store within the Broadmoor Resort in Colorado Springs, Colorado.

In July 2018, Peter Millar opened a location in Miramar Beach.

In May 2018, Peter Millar opened a location in Boston, Massachusetts.

In September 2018, Peter Millar opened a location in Charlotte, North Carolina, in partnership with Paul Simon Company. The store is located in Charlotte's SouthPark area.

In March 2019, Peter Millar opened a location in Newport Beach, California.

In April 2019, Peter Millar opened a location in Chicago on Rush Street.

In November 2019, Peter Millar opened a location in Palmetto Bluff.
