= Mimi So =

American jewelry designer

- Born: New York City
- Education: Parsons School of Design
- Occupations: Entrepreneur; Fine Jewelry Designer
- Known for: Graphic Fine Fashion Jewelry
- Label: Mimi So
- Website: http://www.mimiso.com

Mimi So is a New York City-based American jewelry designer, entrepreneur, philanthropist, and humanitarian known for a "distinctive and definitive fashion vibe" and a large celebrity clientele. Her company was founded as a partnership with luxury conglomerate Richemont, which subsequently sold its interest to Mimi So.

== Biography ==
Born and raised in Lower East Side, New York, the daughter of immigrants from China and Hong Kong, she is the youngest of three siblings. Her parents struggled after immigrating to the United States from China, but eventually opened three jewelry stores in Manhattan's Chinatown. She began to work in her parents’ store at 8 years old, becoming a third-generation jeweler.

Pursuing an interest in graphic design, she graduated from the Parson’s School of Design and initially worked at an advertising agency. She then returned to the family business, managing one of the stores and making pieces of jewelry for clients.

Mimi So opened her own boutique at the corner of 5th Avenue and 47th Street, in Manhattan’s Diamond District in 1998. Following in the footsteps of her mother, she was one of the first women to open a store in the largely Orthodox district.

Mimi So was admitted to the Council of Fashion Designers of America in 2009. In 2012, she was elected to the CFDA board of directors, and in 2015, she was elected Treasurer - one of the five officers of the CFDA, overseeing the CFDA/Vogue Fashion Fund and New York Fashion Week. By 2020, she was elected to the CFDA Emeritus Board.

In 2015, U.S. Vice President Joseph Biden selected Mimi So as a representatives of the U.S., to host Chinese President Xi Jinping at the official state luncheon.

== Mimi So Brand ==
Mimi So attracted a celebrity following after designing the wedding rings and jewelry for David Bowie and Iman. Subsequently, her limited edition designs were frequently worn by the stars of HBO’s Sex and the City.

Neiman Marcus began selling her jewelry in one test location in 2002, and then expanded to 15 precious jewelry salons.

In 2004, Compagnie Financière Richemont, the conglomerate that owns Cartier and several other international luxury brands, formed a joint venture with the designer, launching Mimi So International. The primary goal was international expansion, resulting in the opening of flagship stores in New York, Beverly Hills and Tokyo, with Japan distribution supported by Cartier. The agreement entitled Richemont to purchase full control of the firm after seven years. But after two years, Richemont proposed to take majority ownership immediately. Instead, preferring to maintain control, she bought out Richemont’s share in 2007. Fashion designer Carolina Herrera has been on the Mimi So International Board of Directors since 2004.

Before and during the partnership with Richemont, she advised and designed collections for sister brands including Cartier and Piaget, and designed the first jewelry assortment for Montblanc. In 2012, she was selected as a featured designer by De Beers for the Forevermark Diamond campaign.

In 2005, Mimi So opened a three-story penthouse overlooking 5th Avenue in New York, which featured a designer salon and a glass-enclosed client cafe within a jewelry workshop. Designed by her with support from architects Yabu Pushelberg, it is a modern interpretation of the classical jewelry atelier townhouse, where the retail showroom sat on ground floor, with design and production floors above. Yabu Pushelberg also co-designed her Japan flagship inside the ground floor of Tokyo’s Mitsukoshi Nihonbashi department store, and a boutique on Rodeo Drive in Beverly Hills.

Mimi So generally releases two to three limited edition jewelry collections per year, in sync with the fashion calendar. The jewelry is predominantly hand made in her New York studios.

The Mimi So website was noted by The Wall Street Journal as among the fastest-growing sites to buy fine jewelry online.

According to her CFDA biography, she is known for fine jewelry with modern designs, featuring graphic shapes, clean and asymmetrical lines, and bold fluid movements.

== Recognition ==
Mimi So has been recognized for her philanthropy for children's charities such as the NYFA, New York Fine Arts and APEX for Youth.

In 2003, Harvard Business School selected her business plan as a case study, after which she became an annual guest speaker. A&E’s Biography Magazine featured the designer as a subject, and in its advertising campaign. In 2012, television show 1stLook NY (New York NBC affiliate) produced a biographical video profile, that was also broadcast in the city's 13,000 taxi cabs for two weeks.

== See also ==
- Chinese Americans in New York City
