= Lauritz Dippenaar =

South African businessperson

- Born: 25 October 1948 (age 77)
- Education: Die Hoërskool Menlopark; University of Pretoria
- Occupation: Businessman
- Known for: Dippenaar Scholarship
- Children: Three

Lauritz "Laurie" Dippenaar is a South African millionaire, businessman, investor, and banker who was the Chairman of FirstRand Financial Group. He is also well known for his philanthropic activities and runs a scholarship programme through his scholarship fund.

== Biography ==
Dippenaar graduated from Pretoria University with a Master of Commerce, qualified as a Chartered Accountant with KPMG, and spent three years with the Industrial Development Corporation of South Africa. In 1977, Dippenaar founded FirstRand's predecessor, Rand Consolidated Investing along with Paul Harris and Gerrit Ferreira. He served as executive chairman of RMB from 1992 until the formation of FirstRand in 1998. He was appointed as the first chief executive of FirstRand and held this position until the end of 2005 when he was selected as a chairman for a non-executive role in 2008.

== Philanthropy ==
He sponsors the Laurie Dippenaar Postgraduate Scholarship for International Study. The scholarship is awarded annually and is available to a South African citizen, for study outside South Africa in any discipline at the internationally recognized University of their choice for a Postgraduate degree. It has a value R350 000 ($37,000) per annum for a maximum of two years.

== Personal life ==
Dippenaar is married with three children. His hobbies include watching rugby, canoeing and cycling.

== Financial and legal controversies ==
A press release dated August 27, 2014 featured that US Commodity Futures Trading Commission (CFTC) issued an order filing and settling charges against FirstRand Bank Ltd (under the chairmanship of Lauritz Laurie Dippenaar) and imposed a $150,000 civil monetary penalty for executing unlawful prearranged, non-competitive trades involving corn and soybean futures contracts on the Chicago Board of Trade (CBOT), a designated contract market of the CME Group.
