= Vitality Health and Life Insurance =

United Kingdom-based company

Vitality Health Limited
- Company type: Subsidiary
- Industry: Insurance
- Founded: 1994 (acquisition of Prime Health by Standard Life)
- Headquarters: London, UK
- Key people: Neville Koopowitz, CEO
- Products: Health Insurance, Life Insurance
- Revenue: £1,101.1 million
- Owner: Discovery Limited
- Number of employees: 2577 (across 3 sites London, Bournemouth and Stockport in the United Kingdom
- Parent: Vitality Corporate Services
- Website: vitality.co.uk

Vitality Health Limited is a United Kingdom-based company offering private health insurance and life insurance to the UK market. It is the UK's third-largest health insurer, behind Bupa and Axa, with 1.9 million members as of February 2025.

The company is a subsidiary of Discovery Limited, a South Africa-based financial services group listed on the Johannesburg Stock Exchange (JSE). As well as Vitality in the UK, Discovery Group has other subsidiaries in South Africa, the United States, China, Singapore, and Australia.

== Shared Value Insurance business model ==
Vitality uses a business model known as Shared Value Insurance. Shared Value is a concept created by Professor Michael E. Porter and Mark Kramer of Harvard Business School. They describe it as “policies and operating practices that enhance the competitiveness of a company while simultaneously advancing the economic and social conditions in the communities in which it operates. Shared value creation focuses on identifying and expanding the connections between societal and economic progress."

== History ==
The company was created in 2004 when Discovery and Prudential launched the PruHealth brand in the UK, combining Prudential's UK distribution capability with Discovery's Vitality product that had already been launched to the market in South Africa.

In April 2010, Discovery acquired Standard Life Healthcare, formed in 1994 following the acquisition of Prime Health Limited, and merged it with its PruHealth.

In November 2014, Discovery bought the remaining 25% stake in PruHealth from Prudential, making Discovery the sole owner of the company. Discovery immediately re-branded PruHealth as VitalityHealth, and its sister company PruProtect as VitalityLife, both under the Vitality umbrella brand.

== See also ==
- Private healthcare in the United Kingdom
