= Rand Merchant Investment Holdings =

Defunct South African insurance holding company

- Type: Public
- Traded as: JSE: RMIJ
- Industry: Insurance; Financial services
- Founded: 2010; 16 years ago
- Defunct: 2022; 4 years ago
- Fate: Became OUTsurance Group
- Headquarters: Johannesburg, South Africa
- Number of locations: Worldwide
- Key people: Jannie Durandt (Chairman)
- Products: Insurance and Asset Management
- Revenue: ▲ZAR: 13.69 billion (2015)
- Net income: ▲ZAR: 3.51 billion (2015)
- Total assets: ▲ZAR: 32.32 billion (2015)
- Total equity: ▲ZAR: 18.08 billion (2015)

Rand Merchant Investment Holdings (also referred to as RMI Holdings) was a listed South African financial services investment holding company that held various insurance brands in nine different countries.

In 2022, the group underwent a substantial restructuring. Some assets were unbundled, and OUTsurance was retained as the group's principal underlying business. RMIH was then renamed OUTsurance Group.

== Overview ==
RMI Holdings was listed on the JSE and insurance and investment products and services to retail, commercial, corporate and public sector customers. The group has its headquarters in Sandton, South Africa.

== History ==
RMI Holdings was incorporated and registered in South Africa on 24 March 2010 as a wholly owned subsidiary of RMB Holdings. On 7 March 2011, RMB Holdings (RMBH), Remgro and FirstRand span off their insurance assets to RMI Holdings and separately listing it on the JSE.

The RMB Holdings restructure was announced on 10 December 2010. Its aim was to create separate focused insurance and banking entities. Prior to the restructure RMB Holdings portfolio comprised

- FirstRand – 30% Shareholding.
- OUTsurance – 58.5% Shareholding – RMB Holdings held 45% of OUTsurance directly and an additional 45% through FirstRand bring the total control to 58.5%.
- Momentum Metropolitan Holdings – 18% Shareholding.
- Discovery – 25% Shareholding.
- RMB-Structured Insurance – 76% Shareholding.

The restructure was aimed at separating of RMBH's insurance and banking interests and was executed as follows:

- The transfer of the RMBH, Remgro and FirstRand's insurance interests to its newly incorporated wholly owned subsidiary, RMI Holdings. These insurance assets were transferred in exchange of additional shares in RMI Holdings.
- The unbundling of RMBH's shares in RMI Holdings to RMBH shareholders and the separate listing of RMI Holdings on the JSE by way of introduction. RMI Holdings would then become an insurance-focused investment entity.

The RMBH restructure was completed on 7 March 2011 and the shares of RMIH started trading at the JSE on the same day. This restructure was made possible due to the common shareholding in RMB Holding, Remgro and FirstRand. However, to date RMB Holdings and RMI Holdings share the same management team and resources under a management contract.

In January 2016, the firm changed its name to Rand Merchant Investment Holdings. This was in line with the firm's strategy to invest in the broader financial services sector and beyond the insurance industry. In the same year, RMI Holdings announced that it would be selling its entire shareholding in RMB-SI to Santam.

In 2022, RMIH holding embarked on a restructure of its operations. This involved the unbundling its entire stake in Discovery Limited and Momentum Metropolitan Holdings Limited to its shareholders and the sale of its stake Hastings Group Holdings plc. The company also changed its name to OUTsurance Group.

== Investment portfolio ==
During its existence, RMI Holdings held investments in a range of insurance, financial services and technology businesses. Its principal investments included:

- OUTsurance Holdings Limited – RMI's largest investment, in which it held an 83.6% interest. OUTsurance Holdings conducted short- and long-term insurance activities in South Africa and other markets, including through its OUTsurance and Youi brands.
- Discovery Limited – RMI previously held a 25.8% interest in the financial services group.
- MMI Holdings Limited – RMI previously held a 25.2% interest in MMI Holdings, a South African financial services group formed through the merger of Momentum and Metropolitan.
- Hastings Group Holdings plc – RMI acquired a 29.9% interest in the British general insurance group in 2016.
- RMB-SI Investments Proprietary Limited – RMI previously held a 76% interest in the insurance investment company, which held interests in several insurance and financial services businesses. RMI sold its entire interest to Santam in March 2017.
- RMI Investment Managers – RMI's wholly owned investment advisory business.
- Entersekt – RMI held a 25.1% interest in the online banking security company.
- AlphaCode – RMI's wholly owned technology and venture capital business, which held investments including a 25.1% interest in Merchant Capital and a 3.5% interest in Prodigy Finance.

== Governance ==
RMI Holdings was governed by a sixteen-person board of directors with Gerrit Thomas Ferreira serving as Chairman.
