= Discovery Limited =

South African-based financial services group

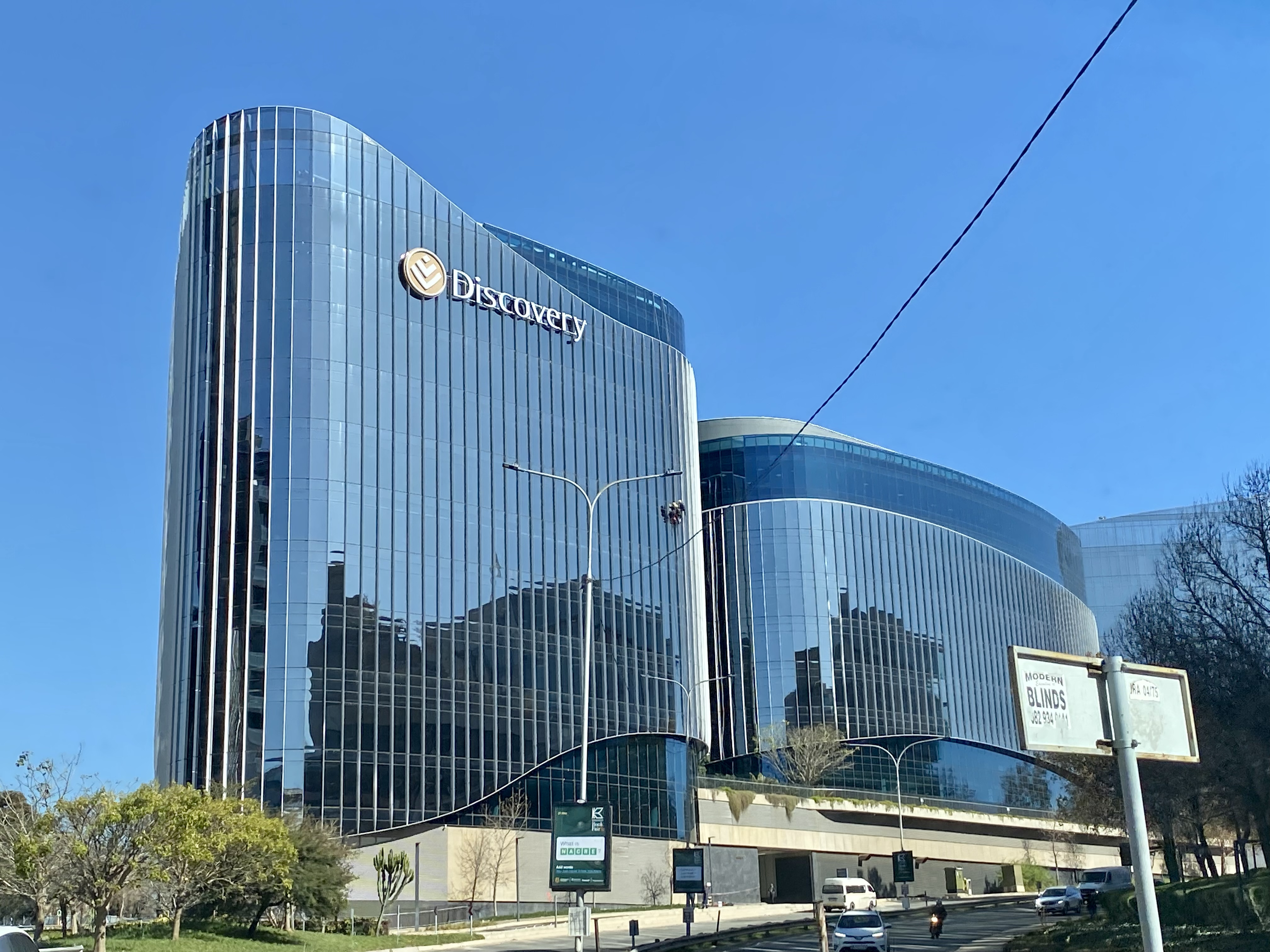
- Discovery Place, a building in Sandton owned by Discovery Limited, that serves as its headquarters
- Type: Public
- Traded as: JSE: DSY
- Industry: Financial services Insurance; Healthcare
- Founded: 1992; 34 years ago
- Founder: Adrian Gore
- Headquarters: Sandton, Gauteng, South Africa
- Area served: 42 markets, including: Australia; China; Singapore; South Africa; United Kingdom; United States
- Key people: Adrian Gore (CEO); ME Tucker (Chairman); DM Viljoen (CFO)
- Products: Insurance; Asset management Banking
- Revenue: ▲ R37.03 billion (2025)
- Operating income: ▲ R14.58 (2025)
- Net income: ▲ R9.55 billion (2025)
- Total assets: ▲ R327.45 billion (2025)
- Total equity: ▲ R65.69 billion (2025)
- Number of employees: 15,000+ (2025)
- Website: discovery.co.za

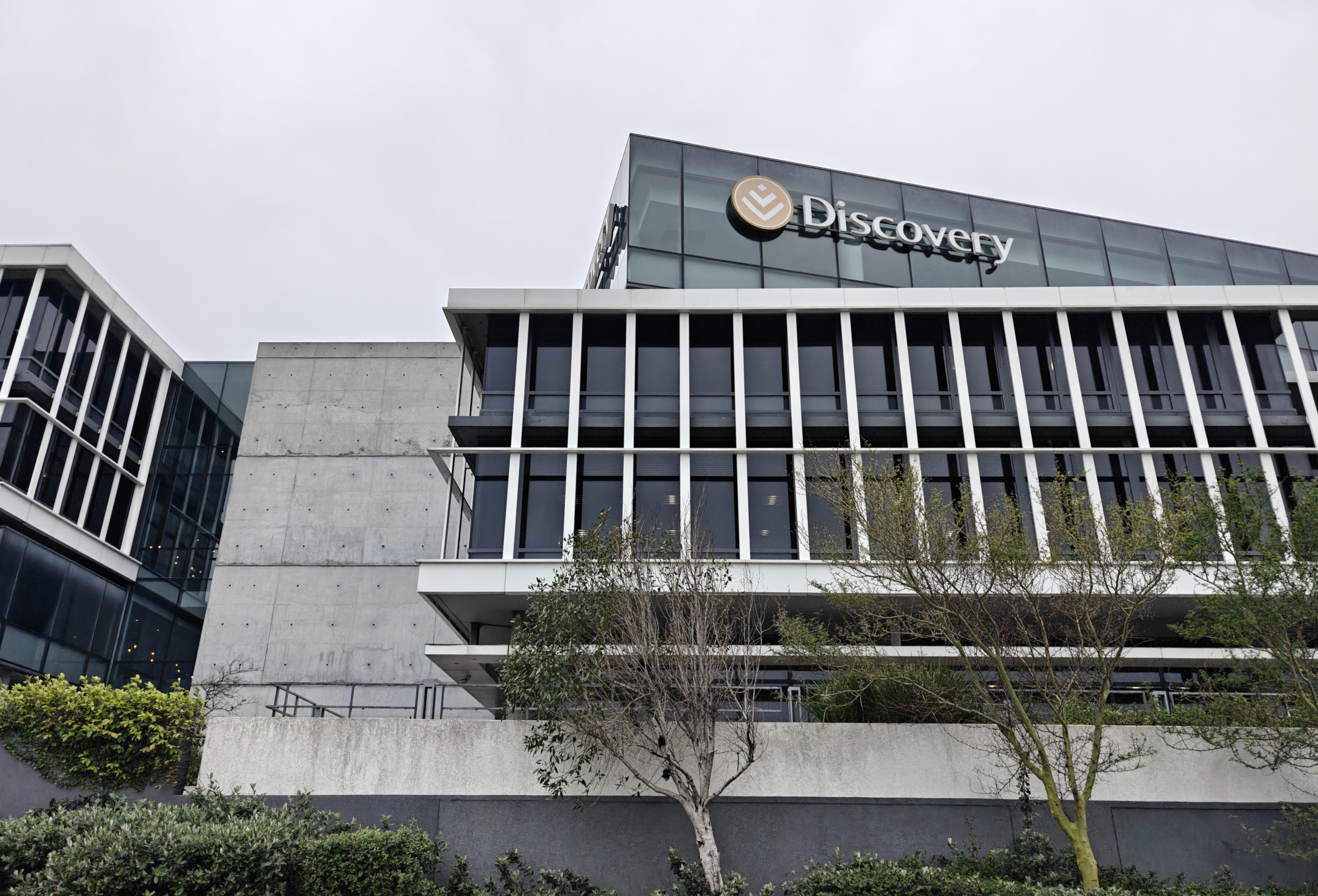
Discovery office in Century City, Cape Town

Africa Padel courts in Claremont, Cape Town. Signage for Discovery is shown as it is an official partner company

Discovery Limited (commonly referred to as Discovery) is a major South African financial services and private healthcare group. Founded in 1992, the company is headquartered in Sandton, and listed on the JSE. Discovery has operations in 42 markets around the world.

Discovery operates the largest private health insurance company in South Africa by total members. As of December 2025, the company has 1.36 million main members and a further 2.72 million dependents (around 4 million total customers). This equates to almost 60% of the South African private health insurance market. The group also operates Discovery Bank, a major South African digital bank that was launched in 2019.

== Overview ==
Discovery Limited engages in long and short-term insurance, asset management, savings, investment, and employee benefits through its various brands. The Group has subsidiaries in South Africa, the United Kingdom, the United States, China, Singapore, and Australia.

== History ==
Discovery Limited was founded in 1992 by Adrian Gore and Barry Swartzberg. In the same year, RMB Holdings (RMBH) acquired a stake in the business by making Discovery Limited its subsidiary through Momentum Group (now part of MMI Holdings Limited).

In 1998, the Momentum Group became part of First Rand after the merger of the financial services interests of Anglo American Corporation of South Africa Limited (now Anglo American plc) and RMBH to achieve the objective of a unified financial services grouping. With First Rand Group owning 75 percent of Discovery Limited.

Discovery Limited was successfully listed on the JSE in October 1999 through a successful initial public offering. During the year, First Rand Group reduced its stake in Discovery Limited to 64 percent. In 2003, Momentum Group Limited transferred its investment in Discovery Limited to FirstRand Limited for R740 million.

In November 2007, FirstRand unbundled all of its entire shareholding in Discovery Limited and allotted the shares of Discovery Limited to its shareholders. This led to RMBH receiving a 25 percent direct stake in Discovery Limited, making it the single largest shareholder.

On 7 March 2011, RMBH, Remgro, and FirstRand spun off their insurance assets to Rand Merchant Insurance Holdings and separately listed it on the JSE. This restructure led to the transfer of RMBH's entire stake in Discovery Limited to RMI Holdings.

In September 2015, Discovery Limited announced its intention to set up a retail banking subsidiary with an initial $150 million investment.

In March 2019, Discovery Limited launched Discovery Bank, the world's first behavioural bank. Despite not being a private bank, its target market is higher income earning South Africans.

In February 2026, Discovery announced that it had purchased the building in which its headquarters was located. Discovery Place, a contemporary building located in Sandton, Gauteng, was to be leased by Discovery for a further seven years, but because the company believed it would use the building beyond that point, it decided to buy the building for a sum of R4 billion.

At the time of purchase Discovery mentioned a commitment to South Africa, long-term strategy, as well as low interest rates and Joburg property prices as contributing factors towards its decision to buy the building.

== Member companies ==
The companies that comprise Discovery Limited include, but are not limited to, the following:

- Discovery Life – Sandton, South Africa – 100% shareholding – Offering life and long term insurance products in South Africa.
- Discovery Health – Sandton, South Africa – 100% shareholding – Offering administration services to medical schemes and specialised medical insurance products in South Africa
- Discovery Vitality – Sandton, South Africa – 100% shareholding
- Discovery Life Collective Investments – Sandton, South Africa – 100% shareholding – Offering unit trusts
- Discovery Life Investment Services – Sandton, South Africa – 100% shareholding – Offering unit trusts.
- Discovery Insure – Sandton, South Africa – 100% shareholding – Offering motor vehicle, household and other short-term risk insurance in South Africa.
- VitalityHealth – London, United Kingdom – 100% shareholding – Offering personal medical insurance products in the United Kingdom. 25% of the venture was previously held by Prudential Plc.
- VitalityLife – London, United Kingdom – 100% shareholding – Offering personal life and long term insurance products in the United Kingdom. 25% of the venture was previously held by Prudential Plc.
- Vitality Corporate Services – London, United Kingdom – 100% shareholding – Offering insurance products to both individuals and groups
- The Vitality Group – Chicago, Illinois, US – 75% shareholding – Offering insurance products to both individuals and groups
- AIA Vitality – Singapore – 50% shareholding – Offering insurance products to both individuals and groups. A joint venture with the AIA Group Limited.
- HumanaVitality – Louisville, Kentucky, US – 25% shareholding – Offering insurance products to both individuals and groups. This is a subsidiary of New York Stock Exchange-listed Humana.
- Ping An Health – Shenzhen, China – 25% shareholding – Offering medical insurance products in China
- Discovery Bank – Financial services via a digital-only bank

== Ownership ==
The shares of Discovery Limited are listed on the JSE. As of June 2023, the shareholding was as follows:

Discovery Limited stock ownership
Rank	Name of owner	Percentage ownership
1	Government Employees Pension Fund	12.96
2	Remgro	7.61
4	Ballie Gifford & Co Limited	7.50
3	Adrian Gore	7.22
5	Other local and international investors	64.71
	Total	100.00

== Corporate social responsibility ==
In 2025, the group stated in its Annual Report that it had set a Net Zero Transition Plan with a goal of net-zero GHG emissions by 2050.

The group operates the Discovery Fund, through which it promotes healthcare service delivery in rural and underserved communities in South Africa, and invests in digital assets to extend access to healthcare and provide medical research and training grants.

== See also ==
- List of companies traded on the JSE
- List of companies of South Africa
- Economy of South Africa
