= Richemont =

Swiss luxury goods company

Compagnie Financière Richemont SA
- Type: Public
- Traded as: SIX: CFR; JSE: CFR; SMI component
- Industry: Luxury goods
- Predecessor: Rembrandt Group Limited
- Founded: 1988; 38 years ago in Geneva, Switzerland
- Founder: Johann Rupert
- Headquarters: Bellevue, Switzerland
- Area served: Worldwide
- Key people: Nicolas Bos (CEO); Jérôme Lambert (COO); Johann Rupert (chairman)
- Products: Watches; jewellery; leather goods; pens; firearms; clothing; accessories
- Revenue: ▲€21.4 billion (2025)
- Operating income: ▼€4.47 billion (2025)
- Net income: ▲€2.75 billion (2025)
- Total assets: ▼€41.01 billion (2025)
- Total equity: ▲€22.17 billion (2025)
- Owner: Compagnie Financière Rupert (Rupert family) (10% equity, 51% voting power)
- Number of employees: 38,896 (2025)
- Divisions: Jewellery Maisons; Specialist Watchmakers; Other Businesses
- Subsidiaries: See § Subsidiaries
- Website: richemont.com

Compagnie Financière Richemont SA, commonly known as Richemont, is a Switzerland-based luxury goods holding company founded in 1988 by South African businessman Johann Rupert. Through its various subsidiaries, Richemont produces and sells jewellery, watches, leather goods, pens, firearms, clothing, and accessories. Richemont is publicly traded as CFR on the SIX Swiss Exchange and the JSE.

The brands it owns include A. Lange & Söhne, Alaïa, AZ Factory, Buccellati, Cartier, Chloé, Delvaux, Dunhill, IWC Schaffhausen, Jaeger-LeCoultre, Montblanc, Mr Porter, Net-a-Porter, Panerai, Piaget, Peter Millar, Purdey, Roger Dubuis, Serapian, The Outnet, TimeVallée, Vacheron Constantin, Van Cleef & Arpels, Vhernier, Watchfinder & Co., and Yoox.

As of August 2025, Compagnie Financière Richemont S.A. was the fourth-largest corporation by market capitalization in the Swiss Market Index.

== History ==
Johann Rupert founded Compagnie Financière Richemont S.A. when he spun off the international assets of Rembrandt Group Ltd. (now Remgro Limited), a South Africa-based company founded in the 1940s by his father, Anton Rupert. The division, originally founded on 5 March 1979 as Intercontinental Mining and Resources S.A., was later renamed IMR Group S.A. on 31 March 1987 and finally Richemont S.A. on 17 August 1988. The spin-off was completed on 20 September 1988. The luxury goods investments of Rembrandt Group combined with Rothmans International formed the initial group of Richemont subsidiaries.

In October 2008, the Group divested all of its remaining interests in the tobacco industry.

As of 2014, Richemont is the second-largest luxury goods company in the world after LVMH.

In 2015, Richemont's Net-a-Porter Group was merged with the YOOX Group in an all-share transaction. In August 2022, Richemont announced the prospective sale of a 47.5% stake in Yoox Net-a-Porter (YNAP) to Farfetch in exchange for Farfetch shares, and the sale of a 3.2% stake to Mohamed Alabbar. In January 2024, Farfetch was acquired by Korean e-commerce company Coupang, and delisted, which ended Richemont's planned sale of the YNAP majority stake.

In 2018, Jérôme Lambert was named CEO of Richemont Group.

The compensation of the Richemont group's executives increased by an average of 14% in 2018.

In March 2023, Richemont launched Enquirus.com to combat jewelry and watch theft.

In July 2023, Richemont acquired a 70% stake in Italian shoemaker Gianvito Rossi.

As of October 2023, Compagnie Financière Richemont S.A. was the sixth-largest corporation by market capitalization in the Swiss Market Index.

In May 2024, Nicolas Bos, the head of Van Cleef & Arpels was appointed CEO effective 1 June 2024, replacing Jérôme Lambert. Lambert would stay at Richemont as chief operating officer reporting to Bos.

In May 2024, Richemont acquired Italian jewellery brand Vhernier for an undisclosed sum.

== Organization ==
Richemont organizes its business activities into three operating divisions: Jewellery Maisons, Specialist Watchmakers, and Other Businesses.

Cartier, Van Cleef & Arpels, and Buccellati constitute the Jewellery Maisons.

The Specialist Watchmakers group is composed of A. Lange & Söhne, IWC Schaffhausen, Jaeger-LeCoultre, Officine Panerai, Piaget, Roger Dubuis, and Vacheron Constantin.

The Other Businesses division includes Alaïa, AZ Factory, Chloé, Delvaux, Dunhill, Montblanc, Peter Millar, Purdey, and Serapian.

== Ownership and control ==
As of 2026, Compagnie Financière Rupert, a Swiss company that holds shares controlled and principally owned by Johann Rupert, was the largest shareholder of Richemont, holding 6,418,850 Richemont Class “A” shares and 537,582,089 Class “B” registered shares, representing 10% of the equity of the company and controlling 50.6% of the company’s voting rights. UBS Fund Management (Switzerland) AG was the only other shareholder with 3% or more of the voting rights.

== Investments ==
=== Subsidiaries ===
Richemont's portfolio is made up of Maisons (brands).

The following companies are wholly owned subsidiaries of Compagnie Financière Richemont S.A., except where specified that they are partial ownership.

| Category | Maison | Location | Offering |
|---|---|---|---|
| Jewellery | Buccellati | Milan, Italy | Jewellery and watches |
| Jewellery | Cartier | Paris, France | Jewellery, watches, leather goods, fragrances, eyewear and accessories |
| Jewellery | Van Cleef & Arpels | Paris, France | Jewellery and watches |
| Jewellery | Vhernier | Milan, Italy | Jewellery and high jewellery |
| Specialist watchmakers | A. Lange & Söhne | Glashütte, Germany | Watches |
| Specialist watchmakers | IWC Schaffhausen | Schaffhausen, Switzerland | Watches |
| Specialist watchmakers | Jaeger-LeCoultre | Le Sentier, Switzerland | Watches |
| Specialist watchmakers | Panerai | Geneva, Switzerland | Watches |
| Specialist watchmakers | Piaget | Geneva, Switzerland | Jewellery, watches |
| Specialist watchmakers | Roger Dubuis | Geneva, Switzerland | Watches |
| Specialist watchmakers | Vacheron Constantin | Geneva, Switzerland | Watches |
| Fashion and accessories | Alaïa | Paris, France | Women's fashion |
| Fashion and accessories | AZ Factory - Joint venture with Alber Elbaz | Paris, France | Women's fashion |
| Fashion and accessories | Chloé | Paris, France | Women's fashion |
| Fashion and accessories | Delvaux | Brussels, Belgium | Leather Goods |
| Fashion and accessories | Dunhill | London, UK | Men's clothing and leather goods |
| Fashion and accessories | Gianvito Rossi (majority stake) | San Mauro Pascoli, Emilia-Romagna, Italy | Shoes |
| Fashion and accessories | Montblanc | Hamburg, Germany | Writing instruments and watches |
| Fashion and accessories | Peter Millar | Raleigh, North Carolina, U.S | Men's and women's apparel |
| Fashion and accessories | Purdey | London, UK | Firearms, clothing, gifts, leather goods, and the Royal Berkshire Shooting School |
| Fashion and accessories | Serapian | Milan, Italy | Leather goods |
| Fashion and accessories | Watchfinder & Co. | Kings Hill, UK | Second-hand watch retail |

== Former investments ==
Richemont acquired British clothing retailer Hackett Limited in 1992. On 2 June 2005, Richemont announced its sale to Spanish investment company Torreal S.C.R., S.A.

In 1998, Richemont bought a controlling stake in Shanghai Tang. In July 2017, Richemont announced that it had sold Shanghai Tang to a group of investors headed by Italian entrepreneur Alessandro Bastagli.

In 2000, the Group sold its minority stake in Vivendi, representing its exit from all previous media interests, which had included NetHold and Canal+.

Richemont and Mimi So formed a joint venture in 2004, Richemont's first investment in an American brand. In 2007, Richemont requested to become the majority partner of the joint venture. Mimi So declined and purchased Richemont's stake in the venture.

Richemont and Polo Ralph Lauren Corporation formed a 50/50 joint venture called The Polo Ralph Lauren Watch and Jewelry Company, S.A.R.L., in March 2007. The joint venture lasted until 2018.

In 2008, Richemont spun off all of its non-luxury goods businesses, principally Richemont's stake in British American Tobacco, into a newly formed, separately traded holding company, Reinet Investments S.C.A.

In 2018, Richemont sold Lancel to the Italian leather goods company Piquadro Group.

In October 2024 Richemont agreed to sell Yoox Net-A-Porter to Mytheresa.

== Website blocking ==
In October 2014, the first blocking order against trademark-infringing consumer goods was passed against the major British Internet service providers by Richemont, Cartier International and Montblanc to block several domains selling trademark-infringing products.
