= Mercia Geises =

Lawyer, businesswoman and corporate executive in Namibia

- Born: c. 1982 (age 43–44); Namibia
- Education: University of Namibia; University of the Free State; University of Stellenbosch
- Occupations: Lawyer, Banker and Corporate Executive
- Years active: since 2002
- Title: Chief executive officer of Standard Bank Namibia Limited

Mercia Geises (born c. 1982), is a Namibian lawyer, banker, businesswoman, and corporate executive, who is the managing director and chief executive officer of Standard Bank Namibia Limited, a commercial bank, whose publicly listed shares trade on the Namibian Stock Exchange and is a member of the Standard Bank Group, headquartered in South Africa. She took up her present appointment on 1 May 2021.

== Background and education ==
Geises obtained a B Juris from the University of Namibia, as well as a Bachelor of Laws degree and a Master of Laws degree in Mercantile Law, both from the University of the Free State in South Africa. She also holds a Master of Business Administration, awarded by the University of Stellenbosch.

== Career ==
She started her legal career as an associate at Weder, Kruger and Hartmann. She then joined Old Mutual Investment Group Namibia (Pty) Limited where she stayed for 12 years, rising to the rank of CEO. In 2016, Geises joined the Standard Bank of Namibia and for the next five years, she served as head of Personal and Business Banking (PBB) at Standard Bank Namibia Holdings Limited and as head of PBB at Standard Bank Namibia Limited.

On 1 May 2021, she took over as CEO at Standard Bank Namibia Limited. She replaced Vetumbuavi Mungunda who stepped down and left the bank on 30 April 2021. In her new position, Mercia Geises joins three other women in Namibia who head commercial banks. As of May 2021, four of the top five commercial banks in Namibia have female Managing Directors. The banks and their managing directors are illustrated in the table below:

Female CEOs of Namibian Commercial Banks 2021
Rank	Bank	Managing Director	Notes
1	Standard Bank Namibia	Mercia Geises	
2	Bank Windhoek	Baronice Hans	
3	Letshego Bank Namibia	Ester Kali	
4	Nedbank Bank Namibia	Martha Murorua	

== See also ==
- Standard Bank Group
- List of banks in Namibia
