= Martha Namundjebo-Tilahun =

Namibian business woman

- Born: Odibo, Namibia
- Education: St. Paul's College; University of California, Berkeley; Santa Clara University
- Occupations: Business executive, politician
- Organization: United Africa Group
- Known for: First female President of the NCCI; Hilton Windhoek ownership
- Title: Chairperson of United Africa Group
- Spouse: Haddis Tilahun
- Children: 3
- Honors: Honorary Doctorate (University of Namibia)

Martha Namundjebo-Tilahun is a Namibian businesswoman and politician. She is the former president of the Namibia Chamber of Commerce and Industry (NCCI).

== Early life and education ==
Martha Namundjebo was born in Odibo village in the north of Namibia. She was raised in Olunghono and went to Engela High School. She obtained a BSc degree in Business Administration and Management from Saint Paul's College Lawrenceville, Virginia. Namundjebo further holds an MBA in Finance from the University of California, Berkeley in the United States, and another MBA from Santa Clara University, likewise in California.

== Career ==
After the retirement of Harold Pupkewitz, Namundjebo-Tilahun succeeded him as president of Namibia Chamber of Commerce and Industry (NCCI) in 2010. She held this position until 2014 when Sven Thieme was elected. Namundjebo-Tilahun is also the chairperson of the SADC Chamber of Commerce and sits on the board of several Namibian companies, including Standard Bank Namibia. She owns Namibia's only Five-Star hotel, the Hilton Hotel in Windhoek. In 2021, documents forming part of the Congo Hold-Up revealed financial links between a Namibian fishing company owned by Namundjebo-Tilahun and alleged illicit funds of former DRC president Joseph Kabila.

In 2017 she was a candidate for the position of deputy secretary general of the Swapo Party. She also had a short stint in Parliament from January to March 2020.

== Private life ==
Her husband Haddis Tilahun, is the founder and executive director of the United Africa Group, the company where she serves as chairperson. They have three children.

== Awards ==
- African Business Leader of the Year, 2013, Corporate Council on Africa, Washington, D.C., United States
- Doctor honoris causa in Business Administration, 2015, University of Namibia
