= Lazarus Shinyemba Ipangelwa =

Namibian banker

CEO of First National Bank (Namibia)
- In office March 2003 – 7 September 2005
- Preceded by: Stuart Moir

Deputy Governor of the Bank of Namibia

Vice President of the Namibia Chamber of Commerce and Industry (NCCI)

Personal details
- Born: Lazarus Shinyemba Ipangelwa; 21 January 1965 Omagongati
- Died: 7 September 2005 (aged 40)

Lazarus Shinyemba Ipangelwa (21 January 1965 – 7 September 2005) was a Namibian businessman and CEO of First National Bank (Namibia). Ipangelwa became the first local black person to head a commercial bank in Namibia when he was appointed in March 2003. He also served as the vice president of the Namibia Chamber of Commerce and Industry, and he was deputy governor of Bank of Namibia prior to joining FNB.

== Early life and education ==
Ipangelwa was born on 21 January 1965 in Omagongati, Owamboland (today Oshana Region). He started school at Eheke Primary School, before moving to Cameroon where he completed his secondary education. He studied for an MBA in International Banking & Finance at the University of Birmingham, United Kingdom. He had a Management Certificate – National Institute of Bank Management, Pune, India / AMP – Templeton College, University of Oxford, UK / Financial Management Certificate – Sando U, Centrum, Sweden.

He worked for Bank of Namibia from 1991 to 2002 in various capacities, including as deputy governor. In July 2002 Ipangelwa joined First National Bank as CEO designate, where his initial responsibility was to coordinate the planned merger between Swabou Group and FNB. In March 2003 he was appointed as CEO of FNB, which, as a result of the merger, a few months later became FNB Namibia Holdings Ltd. The merger was successfully completed and the FNB Namibia Group of Companies formed under his leadership.

== Personal life and legacy ==
Ipangelwa died aged 40 on 7 September 2005 in a car crash along with his son and his domestic worker. His daughter survived.

A non-profitable foundation, Lazarus Shinyemba Ipangelwa (LSI) Foundation, was launched in his name in June 2007. LSI provides training and mentoring programmes to students.
