= Omagongati =

- Settlement
- Location in Namibia
- Coordinates: 17°55′S 15°48′E
- Country: Namibia
- Region: Oshana
- Time zone: UTC+2 (SAST)

Omagongati is a village situated in the northern part of Namibia in Ondangwa Rural Constituency, Oshana region, it borders the Kingdom of Ondonga from that of Uukwambi, and it is under the leadership of the headman Mr. Noah Heikki Nakwafila, well known as Kapinya. Omagongati is as far from Ondangwa as it is from Oshakati, roughly 17 km away and 11km from Ongwediva. It is surrounded by numerous villages, namely Ashaaga, Onelago, Uudhengelo and Okatha, with the nearest town Eheke which has a high school and more improved infrastructures.

As most other villages country wide, Omagongati also suffered the consequences of flood because it is in a flood-prone area. During the colonial era this village was also affected, the inhabitants’ houses were destroyed and their cultivating land was left dilapidated, although the village managed to reframe a moment after the war.

== Village Life ==
Omagongati lacks any large markets of its own, instead minimarkets and shebeen provide villages with their basic needs. Public holidays are celebrated communally, and the village is known for its local football aspirations.

== Development ==
After the Namibian independence, vivid improvements could be read from Omagongati. These in a form of the introduction of electricity, land lines (telephones), mobile telecommunication network access, water and a gravel road that is connected to the one from Eheke to Ompundja. Omagongati as a village also have a combined school which accommodates pupils from pre-primary to grade 10. There is also a Roman Catholic Church in Omagongati which has no religious discrimination.

== Other ==
Individually Omagongati also produced leading figures of the Republic of Namibia, namely, the late Minister of Education Hon. Abraham Iyambo and the former CEO of FNB the late Lazarus Shinyemba Ipangelwa.
