= Aldermore =

British retail bank

Aldermore Bank plc
- Formerly: Lordsvale Finance plc (1969–1996); Ruffler Bank plc (1996–2009)
- Type: Public
- Industry: Finance
- Founded: 2009; 17 years ago
- Headquarters: Reading, Berkshire
- Key people: Pat Butler (Chairman); Raj Makanjee (CEO)
- Products: Savings; Mortgages; Business Finance
- Revenue: ▲£ 600.4 million (2025)
- Operating income: ▼£ 193.5 million (2025)
- Net income: ▼£ 141.1 million (2025)
- Parent: FirstRand (since 2018)
- Website: aldermore.co.uk

Aldermore Bank plc is a specialist bank which provides financial services to small and medium-sized businesses and personal customers. It was founded in 2009 and listed on the London Stock Exchange in March 2015. It was a constituent of the FTSE 250 Index until it was acquired by South African banking conglomerate FirstRand in March 2018.

== History ==
Aldermore was established with backing from private equity company, AnaCap Financial Partners LLP, in early 2009.

The acquisition of Ruffler Bank in May 2009 provided Aldermore with its banking licence and an asset finance business which was combined with the commercial mortgage business of Base Commercial Mortgages, a small mothballed operation.

AnaCap purchased Cattles Invoice Finance, a factoring business, from Cattles PLC in 2009, and in 2010 the division became part of Aldermore.

It raised £62 million of further investment from a consortium of funds managed by Goldman Sachs Asset Management, Honeywell Capital Management and the Ohio Public Employees Retirement System in August 2011, and it received an additional capital investment from Centerbridge Partners when it issued a £36 million subordinated bond in May 2012.

In 2012, the bank reached its first full year of profits in its third year of operations.

Aldermore was recognised as a challenger bank by the media and launched a successful initial public offering in March 2015, with an opening market capitalisation of approximately £651 million.

In October 2017, it was announced that Aldermore had agreed to be acquired by South African banking conglomerate FirstRand. The deal valued Aldermore at £1.1bn.

In March 2026, Aldermore acquired a £465m portfolio of bridging finance loans and the associated capability from Octane Capital.

== Operations ==
Aldermore provides financial services to small and medium-sized businesses as well as personal customers.

The bank offers business finance lending through a range of different propositions across the following areas: asset finance; invoice finance, and commercial real estate. The product can be tailored around a specific client's need and is originated through a team of specialist experts as well as via specialist brokers. Its lending activity is largely funded by the deposits it receives from business and personal savers.

Aldermore is a digital bank and therefore has no branch network but serves customers and intermediary partners online and by phone. It has been recognised as one of the Top 10 Best Places to Work in the 'very big' organisation category by The Sunday Times.

Raj Makanjee joined Aldermore as CEO in September 2025, having served 17 years with FirstRand, recently as Chief Digital Officer and CEO, FNB Retail and Private Banking. In September 2025, Louise Britnall replaced Ralph Coates as CFO, having been at Co-Operative Bank previously.

The company's board has been chaired by Pat Butler since January 2018.

== Affiliations ==
Aldermore is the sponsor of the National Association of Commercial Finance Brokers (NACFB), and a member of the Council of Mortgage Lenders. Aldermore is a member of the following bodies: the British Bankers' Association, the Finance and Leasing Association, the Asset Based Finance Association, the Council of Mortgage Lenders and the Intermediary Mortgage Lenders Association.
