= Banking in Namibia =

Banking in Namibia started in June 1906, when German colonists formed the Deutsche Afrika Bank, which would become the First National Bank of Namibia. Following Namibian Independence in 1990, the Namibian banking sector came under the control of the new government which restructured the sector and created the Bank of Namibia as the central bank. Today banking is dominated by South African commercial banks who operate subsidiaries in Namibia.

== History ==
Banking in Namibia started in June 1906, when German colonists formed the Deutsche Afrika Bank, which would become the First National Bank of Namibia. Following Namibia Independence in 1990s, the Namibian banking sector came under the control of the new government.

The 1990s saw the restructuring of the Namibian banking system, with new commercial banks created, and a new central bank, Bank of Namibia set up. The architect of this restructuring, Dr WL Bernard, became the first governor of the new central bank.

== Banks ==
Banking in Namibia is regulated by the Namibia Financial Institutions Supervisory Authority (NamFISA), an organisation of government.

The Bank of Namibia functions as the central bank of Namibia, whose establishment is enshrined in Article 128 of the Namibian Constitution. The bank is located in the capital, Windhoek. The Bank of Namibia was established in 1990 by the Bank of Namibia Act, 1990 (Act 8 of 1990). The Bank of Namibia is the only institution that is permitted to issue the Namibian dollar by the authority that has been given to it under an Act of the Namibian Parliament. The head of the Bank of Namibia is the Governor of the Bank of Namibia.

Commercial banks with a banking license are:

Systemically important banks

1. Bank Windhoek Limited
2. First National Bank Namibia (FNB)
3. Nedbank Namibia Limited
4. Standard Bank Namibia

Others

1. Banco Privado Atlántico Namibia
2. Bank BIC Namibia Limited
3. Letshego Bank Namibia

Only Bank Windhoek is a Namibian-owned company. FNB, Nedbank, and Standard Bank are South African-owned. Bank BIC is an Angolan company, Banco Atlantico is Spanish, and Letshego is owned by Tswana investors.

Namibia has 400 registered microlenders which offer "payday lending" (1–5 months repayment period, maximum interest 30% once-off) and "term lending" (6–60 months repayment period, maximum interest double that of commercial banks). In 2022, over 230,000 households were indebted with microlenders to a total of 7.3 billion N$.

== Restrictions ==
As of 2025, Namibia does not offer local payment integration, preventing transfers via PayPal and Apple Pay, and monetisation of YouTube content.

== See also ==
- Banking in Africa
- Economy of Namibia
