= Zedcrest =

Nigerian financial services company

Zedcrest Group
- Type: Private
- Industry: Financial services
- Founded: 2013
- Headquarters: Lagos, Nigeria
- Products: Asset management, investment banking, securities trading, consumer and SME financing
- Website: www.zedcrest.com

Zedcrest Group is a Nigerian financial services company headquartered in Lagos. It was founded in 2013 by Adedayo Amzat and operates through subsidiaries in asset management, investment banking, securities trading, and consumer and SME financing.

== History ==
Zedcrest began in 2013 as a securities trading firm focused on fixed-income instruments. In July 2024, Zedcrest acquired RMB Nigeria Stockbrokers Limited, a member of Rand Merchant Bank, the corporate and investment banking arm of FirstRand Group. The acquired company was renamed Zedcrest Securities.

== Awards ==
Zedcrest Group placed fifth in the Financial Times 2022 ranking of Africa's Fastest-Growing Companies.

Zedcap Partners, the group's securities brokerage arm (later Zedcrest Global Markets), won the FMDQ Gold Award for Best Brokerage Service Firm in 2019, 2020 and 2021.
