= FNB v Rosenblum =

South African legal case

First National Bank of SA Ltd v Rosenblum and Another is an important case in South African contract law, heard in the Supreme Court of Appeal (SCA) by Marais JA, Navsa JA and Chetty AJA on May 21, 2001, with judgment handed down on June 1. Counsel for the appellant was MD Kuper SC (with H. van Eeden); PM Wulfsohn SC (with T. Ossin) appeared for the respondents.

== Facts ==
The respondents sued the appellant bank in a Local Division for damages arising out of the theft of the contents of a safe deposit box provided at a small annual fee by the bank for Rosenblum's use. First National Bank (FNB) sought to avoid liability on the ground that a term of the contract for the provision of the box expressly excluded liability.

The relevant term (clause 2) provided that, while the bank "will exercise every reasonable care, it is not liable for any loss or damage caused to any article lodged with it for safe custody whether by theft, rain, flow of storm water, wind, hail, lightning, fire, explosion, action of the elements or as a result of any cause whatsoever, including war or riot damage and whether the loss or damage is due to the bank's negligence or not."

The stated case prepared in the matter placed it beyond doubt that one or more of FNB's staff had stolen the safe deposit box or allowed one or more third parties to steal it. In doing so, the staff had acted with negligence or even gross negligence regarding the control of the keys which safeguarded the place where the box was kept, making it possible for the theft to take place.

Although loss caused by theft or negligence had specifically been enumerated in the relevant clause excluding the bank's liability, the respondents contended that not all the possible manifestations of theft were covered by the clause. Theft by the bank's employees, acting within the course and scope of their employment, was not covered.

The respondents contended further that gross negligence and negligent acts or omissions committed by the bank's employees had not been excluded. The respondents argued that the clause was silent as to by whom the theft had to be committed before the bank would be immune from a claim. It could not have been intended to mean that the bank would not be liable even if it was the bank itself that stole in the sense that those who were the "controlling minds" of the bank had committed the theft. This was so, the respondents argued, because no one could contract out of liability for deliberately committed dishonest acts.

Relying on the eiusdem generis rule, they further argued that the clause dealt only with causes of loss beyond the control of the bank. As theft by employees acting in the course and within the scope of their employment was something over which the bank did have control, theft by such persons was not within the protection against liability provided by the clause. The respondents contended that the additional phrase "or as a result of any cause whatsoever" did not serve to expand the protection offered by the clause to encompass any other cause, whatever its nature. The phrase should be interpreted restrictively to read, "or as a result of any cause whatsoever over which the bank has no control."

The Local Division concluded that FNB was not entitled to rely on the specific term in its defence of the action. FNB appealed against this finding.

== Judgment ==
The SCA held that, in matters of contract, the parties are taken to have intended their legal rights and obligations to be governed by the common law unless they have plainly and unambiguously indicated the contrary. Therefore, even where an exclusionary clause is couched in language sufficiently wide to be capable of excluding liability for a negligent failure to fulfil a contractual obligation, or for a negligent act or omission, it would not be regarded as doing so if there was another realistic and not fanciful basis of potential liability to which the clause could apply and so have a field of meaningful application. In the end, however, the answer had to be found in the language of the clause read in the context of the agreement as a whole in its commercial setting, and against the background of the common law with due regard to any constitutional implication.

The assemblage of causes of loss or damage contained in the relevant clause, the court determined, consisted of an unrelated collection of phenomena, some which were natural and the occurrence of which were beyond human control, and some which emanated from human conduct. While the occurrence of the natural phenomena was not preventable, the damaging consequences of their occurrence could be prevented by taking adequate measures. If there was negligence in averting the damaging consequences contrary to a duty in law to do so, the bank would be liable at common law for the ensuing loss, even though it had no control over the occurrence of those phenomena. Similarly, the breadth of the phrase "or as a result of any cause whatsoever" could not be narrowed so as to exclude liability only for causes beyond the control of the bank.

Although there was no direct reference to the bank's employees in the relevant clause, it seemed obvious to the court that they were included in it. If the exemption from liability accorded by the clause were to be construed as being confined to cases in which only the acts and omissions of those who were identified as the "controlling or directing minds" of the bank were involved, the potential field of operation of the exemption would be so slight as not to have been worth the bank's while to insist on it. This would have left FNB entirely unprotected against liability stemming from the potential negligence or dishonesty of many thousands of employees. The bank, as an artificial, non-human entity, was obviously incapable of being negligent itself in fact. The negligence of the human beings acting as the bank's controlling minds was attributed to the bank; it could also be held vicariously liable for the negligence of ordinary employees acting in the course and within the scope of their employment. When the bank said that it was not liable "whether the loss or damage was due to the bank's negligence or not," it included loss or damage due to the negligence of its employees. Furthermore, the clause provided quite plainly that, even if the loss or damage was due to the bank's own negligence, attributed to it as a result of the negligence of its controlling minds or its employees, it was still immune from liability.

The court found nothing in clause 2 to suggest that only culpa levis, but not culpa lata, was to enjoy immunity; the immunity extended to gross negligence. Accordingly, the court ruled that the relevant clause exempted the bank from liability

- for theft committed by its own employees in the course and within scope of their employment;
- for failing to exercise reasonable care and so negligently rendering it possible for the theft to take place; and
- for the negligence or gross negligence of its staff, acting in the course of and within the scope of their employment, regarding control of the keys to the place where the safe deposit box was kept, so rendering it possible for the theft to take place.

The claims of the respondents ought accordingly to have been dismissed.

The appeal was thus allowed and the decision in the Witwatersrand Local Division, in Rosenblum and Another v First National Bank of SA Ltd, reversed.

== See also ==
- South African contract law
