= Kokerboom Solar Power Station =

Solar power station in Namibia

- Country: Namibia
- Location: Kokerboom, ǁKaras Region
- Coordinates: 26°28′49″S 18°13′52″E
- Status: Proposed
- Commission date: 2023 Expected
- Construction cost: N$300 million (over US$19 million)
- Owner: Alpha Namibia Industries Renewable Power (ANIREP)
- Operator: ANIREP

Solar farm
- Type: Flat-panel PV

Power generation
- Nameplate capacity: 18.5 MW (24,800 hp)
- Annual net output: 40 GWh

The Kokerboom Power Station, is an 18.5 megawatts solar power plant under development in Namibia. The public–private partnership (PPP) development project is owned by Alpha Namibia Industries Renewable Power (ANIREP), a Namibian independent power producer (IPP), who was awarded the concession in June 2022, to design, construct, finance, own, operate and maintain the power station. The energy off-taker is "Dundee Precious Metal", a Canadian mining company, for use in its mining operations in the area. This is possible via the national grid "through a modified single-buyer model", under Namibian laws.

== Location ==
The power station would be located in the settlement of Kokerboom, near the city of Keetmanshoop, in Namibia's ǁKaras Region, in southern Namibia. Kokerboom is about 16 kilometres (10 mi), by road, northeast of Keetmanshoop, on the road to Koes (M29 Highway). This is approximately 510 kilometres (317 mi) south of Windhoek, the capital and largest city of Namibia.

== Overview ==
The power station has an 18.5 megawatt capacity. Its output will be integrated into the national grid for transmission to the contracted buyer, reportedly the Namibian subsidiary of Dundee Precious Metal, a Canadian mining conglomerate.

According to Construction Review Online, as of June 2022, Namibia's installed capacity was 680 megawatts. At that time, 517 megawatts (76 percent), was sourced from renewable sources. However, 68 percent of the energy utilized in the country is imported the South African utility company, Eskom, under the Southern Africa Power Pool umbrella. This power station is an attempt to reduce power imports into Namibia.

== Construction ==
As of June 2022, the power purchase agreement had not yet been signed. One that is out of the way, financial closure would need to be achieved. Construction would then begin, after which commercial commissioning would follow.

== See also ==
- List of power stations in Namibia
- Khan Solar Power Station
