= First National Bank (Namibia) =

Bank of Namibia

FNB Namibia Holdings Limited
- Type: Public
- Traded as: NSX: FNB
- Industry: Banking; Financial services
- Predecessor: Merger of First National Bank Limited and Swabou
- Headquarters: 130 Independence Avenue, Windhoek, Namibia
- Key people: P Grüttemeyer (Chairman); Conrad Dempsey (CEO FirstRand Holdings); Nangula Kauluma (CEO:FNB Retail); Sepo Haihambo (CEO:FNB Retail); Georg Garrels (CEO:FNB Insurance); Rodney Forbes (COO: FNB Namibia)
- Products: Consumer banking, Corporate banking, Financial services, Investment banking, Home loans, Private banking, Short Term Insurance, Alternative Banking Channels
- Number of employees: 2000+ (2024)
- Parent: First Rand
- Divisions: WesBank Namibia, RMB Namibia, FNB Insurance, FNB Namibia, Ashburton
- Website: www.fnbnamibia.com.na

First National Bank Namibia (FNB Namibia) is Namibia's largest commercial bank. It has been voted Namibia's best performing bank for several years.

The bank is headquartered in Windhoek's Independence Avenue. It is one of the eleven commercial banks licensed to operate in the country by the Bank of Namibia (BoN), and the first commercial bank created in the country before independence.

== History ==
FNB Namibia was founded as Deutsche Afrika Bank (DAB) in 1907, and in 1915 the National Bank of South Africa took over the assets of DAB which was in 1926 integrated with Barclays Bank. Barclays Bank changed the name of the South African operation to Barclays National Bank Limited in 1971, and later to First National Bank of Southern Africa. After the shareholding changed in December 1987, First National Bank of Namibia Limited was incorporated in February 1988. FNB Namibia was listed on the Namibia Stock Exchange in 1997 and is currently the largest locally listed company with market capitalisation of N$ 1,9 billion or 39% of the NSX total market cap. The merger between FNB Namibia and Swabou happened in 2003.

=== First Rand Group ===
The First Rand Group was established in 1998, by the merger of First National Bank of South Africa, Rand Merchant Bank and Momentum Insurance & Asset Management. First Rand is listed as a "locally controlled bank" by the South African Reserve Bank, the national banking regulator. As of May 2012, the group had total assets valued at US$90.3+ billion (ZAR:698 billion) (2011) with subsidiaries in seven sub-Saharan countries and in Australia and India. Expansion plans in another six African countries are underway.

== See also ==
- Bank of Namibia
- Economy of Namibia
- List of banks in Namibia
