= Bank Gaborone =

Commercial Bank in Botswana

Bank Gaborone Limited
- Type: Subsidiary
- Industry: Banking
- Founded: 2006
- Headquarters: Gaborone, Botswana
- Key people: Koos Brandt (Chairman); Andre Barnard (Managing Director)
- Products: Financial services
- Parent: Capricorn Group
- Website: www.bankgaborone.co.bw

Bank Gaborone Limited (Bank Gaborone) is a commercial bank in Botswana. It is a subsidiary of the Capricorn Group.

As of June 2009, the bank had 5 branches and over 30 ATMs throughout the country.

== History ==
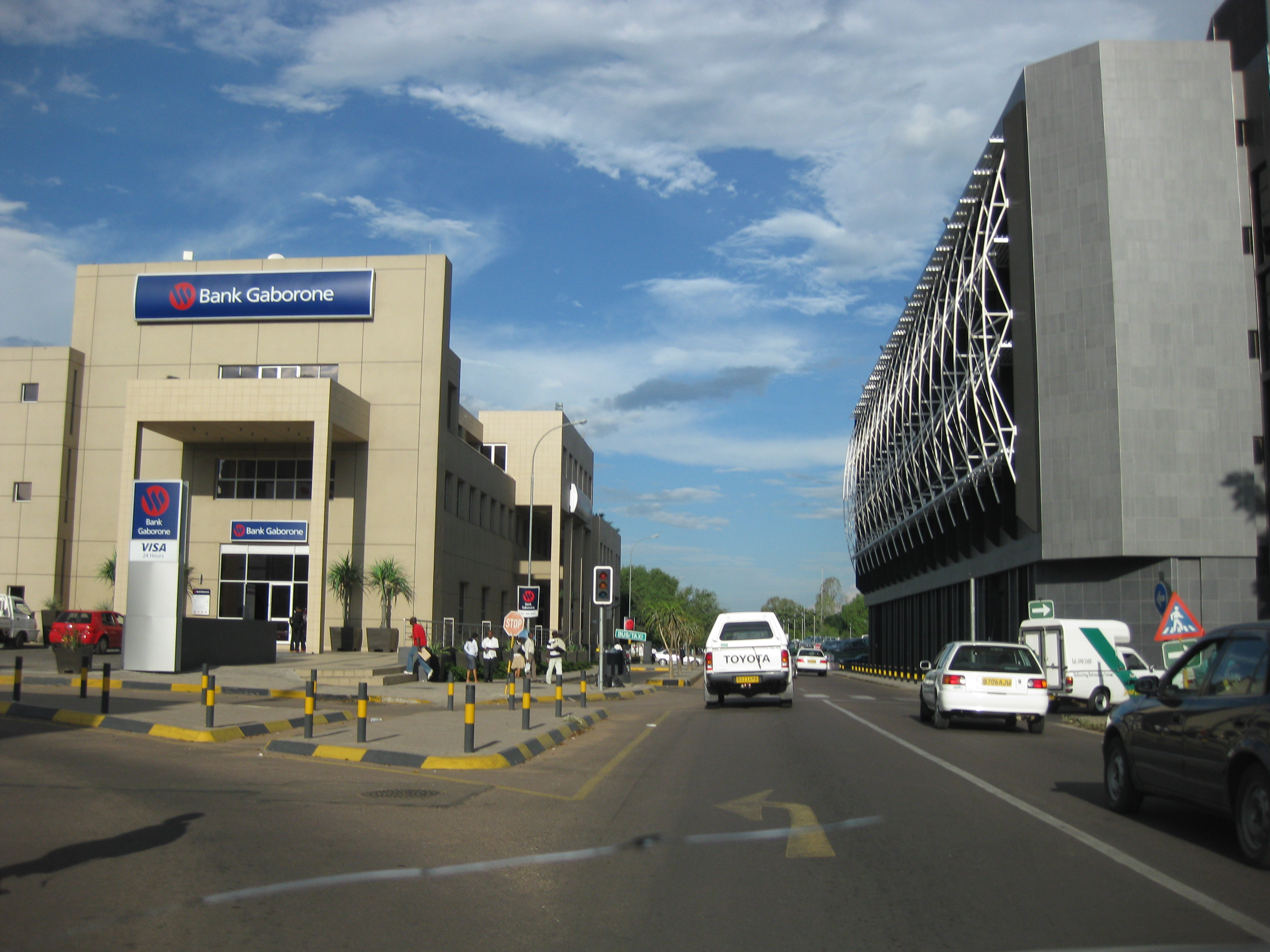
Bank in Gaborone (2009)

The Bank of Botswana issued a license to Bank Gaborone Limited to commence with its full retail banking business on 1 February 2006. The bank opened their first branch on Pilane Road, Gaborone during September 2006. Since 2022, the bank boasts 11 branches in the city's main mall, Gamecity Mall, Central business district (Gaborone), Molepolole, Kang, Ghanzi, Maun, Kasane, Francistown, Palapaye and Mahalapye.

== Ownership ==
Bank Gaborone is a 100% subsidiary of Capricorn Investment Holdings (Botswana) Limited (CIHB). In turn, CIHB is 94.9% owned by Capricorn Investment Holdings (CIH).

== Group Structure ==
Capricorn Investment Holdings owns other financial institutions in whole or in part, including the following:

- Botswana

- Capricorn Investment Holdings (Botswana) Limited – 94.9% Shareholding
- Bank Gaborone Limited – 94.9% Shareholding
- Ellwood Insurance Brokers limited – 94.9% Shareholding
- SmartSwitch Botswana Limited – 47.5% Shareholding
- Capricorn Asset Management Limited – 75.2% Shareholding
- Capricorn Capital Limited – 100% Shareholding
- Cyan ES Limited – 100% Shareholding

- Namibia

- Bank Windhoek Holdings Limited – 73% Shareholding
- Bank Windhoek – 73% Shareholding
- BW finance Limited – 73% Shareholding
- Welwitschia Nammic Insurance Brokers Limited – 56.7% Shareholding
- Namib Bou Limited – 73% Shareholding
- Santam Namibia Limited – 18.3%Shareholding
- Sanlam Namibia Holdings Limited – 21.5% Shareholding
- Nammic Financial Services Holdings – 100% Shareholding
- GH Group Employee Share Trust – 16.4% Shareholding

- Zambia

- Cavmont Capital Holdings Zambia Plc. - 44.5% Shareholding
- Cavmont Capital Bank – 44.5% Shareholding

== Branches ==
As of September 2010, the bank maintains branches at the following locations:

1. Main Branch – Main Mall, Gaborone
2. Game City Mall Branch – Gaborone
3. Molepolole Branch – Mafenyatlala Mall, Molepolole
4. Francistown Branch – Galo Mall, Francistown
5. Ghanzi Branch – Ghanzi
6. CBD Branch, Gaborone
7. Rail park Shopping Mall, Gaborone
8. Game city mall, Gaborone
9. Airport Junction Mall Gaborone

== See also ==
- List of banks in Botswana
- List of banks in Namibia
- List of banks in Zambia
