= Trustco Bank Namibia =

Former Namibian microfinance bank

Trustco Bank Namibia Ltd.
- Company type: Private
- Industry: Banking
- Genre: Microfinance
- Predecessor: FIDES Bank Namibia
- Founded: 1 February 2010
- Defunct: 3 March 2025
- Fate: Dissolution
- Headquarters: Ongwediva, Namibia
- Number of locations: 4 branches (2012)
- Area served: Namibia (Ohangwena, Omusati, Oshana and Oshikoto)
- Services: Microfinance; SME finance
- Owner: Trustco Group Holdings
- Number of employees: 135 (2012)
- Divisions: Microfinance operations MSME operations
- Website: Trustco – Banking and Finance

Trustco Bank Namibia Ltd., formerly the FIDES Bank Namibia, was a commercial bank in Namibia owned by Trustco Group Holdings. Its main commercial activity was to provide microfinancing services.

== History ==
The bank was built after a pilot project called Koshi Yomuti ELO. This project developed microfinance activities from 2002 to 2010, targeting specifically rural population seeking to develop income generation activities. This project initially started in Ohangwena Region and moved to Ondangwa in 2005, Oshakati in 2006 and Outapi in 2007.

Upon creation of the bank, then operating as FIDES Bank Namibia, the portfolio of loan was transferred to the new institution, which developed from then on an MSME portfolio as well.

The bank received its provisional banking license on 4 August 2009. and its permanent license on 1 February 2010.

Trustco Bank Namibia Limited was dissolved in 2024, after several regulatory and financial setbacks led parent company Trustco Group Holdings to exit its commercial banking investment in Namibia. The bank returned its banking license to the Bank of Namibia for immediate cancellation.

=== Activity ===
The institution had its headquarters located in Ongwediva in Oshana Region (North-Central part of Namibia). It was one of five commercial banks in 2009 licensed to operate in the country by the Bank of Namibia (the national banking regulator) and the first microfinance bank created in the country since independence.

Trustco Bank Namibia was active in two banking segments:

- income generation activities financing (microfinance): this activity aimed at proposing savings and loans products to a clientele mainly located in rural areas of the country. The development of this activity was based on a group methodology and dealt with populations almost exclusively excluded from the formal Namibian banking system.
- Micro, small and medium-size enterprises financing: this activity targeted semi-formalised and formalised businesses, usually not approached by traditional banks.

At the end of 2012, FIDES Bank Namibia had a client base of approximately 11,000 people and little above 650 microfinance groups, borrowing on average 216 euros.

=== Geographical Presence and Branch Network ===
In October 2012, FIDES Bank Namibia was present in the four 'O' regions of Northern-Central Namibia (Ohangwena, Omusati, Oshana and Oshikoto). It had a network of 4 branches located in Ondangwa, Oshakati, Oshikango and Outapi. The first branch was opened in Oshakati in April 2010. A new branch was about to open in the Khomas region, in Katutura.

== Ownership ==
FIDES Bank Namibia was owned at the time of its inception by four shareholders:

- Swiss Microfinance Holding (30.05%);
- German Development Bank KfW (24.90%);
- Investisseurs et Partenaires pour le développement from France (22.45%); and
- the Belgium-based fund Volksvermogen NV (12.60%);
- the French cooperative bank Crédit Coopératif (10.00% - since late 2011).

In 2014 the bank was acquired by Trustco Group Holdings and renamed to Trustco Bank Namibia, Ltd.

== See also ==
- Bank of Namibia
- Economy of Namibia
- List of banks in Namibia
- Microcredit
