= Johan Burger =

South African businessman

Johan Petrus Burger is a South African businessman and the Chairman of FirstRand. He succeeded Sizwe Nxasana who retired after nine years as CEO. Burger was previously the company's CFO. He graduated from the University of Johannesburg.
