= Cavmont Bank =

Zambian commercial bank

Cavmont Bank Limited
- Company type: Public: LUSE: CCHZ
- Industry: Financial services
- Founded: January 1, 2004; 22 years ago
- Headquarters: 2374 Thabo Mbeki Road, Lusaka, Zambia
- Key people: Guy Phiri; Chairman; Charles H. de B Carey; Chief Executive Officer
- Products: Loans, Checking, Savings, Foreign & Local Currency Investments, Debit Cards, Online Banking & ePayments, ATMs
- Revenue: ▲ Aftertax:ZMW:696,000 (US$71,100) (2016)
- Total assets: ZMW:946.8 million (US$96.7 million) (2016)
- Number of employees: 245 (2016)
- Website: Homepage

Cavmont Bank Limited is a commercial bank in Zambia. It is licensed by the Bank of Zambia, the central bank and national banking regulator.

== Location ==
The headquarters and main branch of Cavmont Bank Limited are located at 2374 Thabo Mbeki Road, in the city of Lusaka, the capital and largest city in Zambia. The geographical coordinates of the headquarters of the bank are: 15°24'06.0"S, 28°19'20.0"E (Latitude:-15.401667; Longitude:28.322222).

== Overview ==
CBL provides an array of banking services including in the areas of community banking, retail banking, investment, and corporate banking. As of June 2016, the bank was a retail bank with total assets valued at ZMW:946.8 million (US$96.7 million), with shareholders' equity of ZMW:118.1 million (US$12.1 million). At that time the bank employed a total of 245 people. By December 2016, the bank's total assets had increased to ZMW:1,063,735,000.00 (US$108.64 million).

== History ==
The Bank was established on 1 January 2004, following a merger between Cavmont Merchant Bank Limited (incorporated in October 1992), and New Capital Bank Plc., (incorporated in June 1992). In 2006 the Bank's holding company, Cavmont Capital Holdings Zambia Plc (CCHZ)', sought a strategic investment partner and identified Capricorn Investment Holdings Limited (CIH). CIH acquired a 44.2% shareholding in CCHZ in 2007.

Discussions held with the Bank of Zambia to find an acceptable manner to recapitalize Cavmont Bank through a rights issue by CCHZ were concluded successfully, with CIH underwriting the rights issue. Consequently, CCHZ raised additional share capital of more than K15.4 billion in 2007 and the re-positioning of Cavmont Bank commenced.

The Bank of Zambia revised capitalization requirements for local Banks and foreign Banks and it is in light of this that the holding company has warehoused 51% shares in Makumbi Investments Limited a special purpose vehicle earmarked for forward offer to local investors. As of 31 December 2013, the Bank has met the equity shareholding and capital requirements for local banks.

== Ownership ==
Cavmont Bank Limited is a 100 percent subsidiary of Cavmont Capital Holdings Zambia Plc. (CCHZ). The investors in CCHZ, and therefore in CBL, include Capricorn Investment Holdings (CIH), a financial conglomerate with investment interests in three Southern African countries: Botswana, Namibia and Zambia. CIH owns controlling interests in Bank Gaborone in Botswana and Bank Windhoek in Namibia, in addition to its minority shareholding in Cavmont Capital Holdings Zambia Plc. The stock of the holding company, CCHZ, is Listed on the Lusaka Stock Exchange (LUSE), where it trades under the symbol: CCHZ. The shareholding in CCHZ and therefore in CBL is depicted in the table below:

Cavmont Bank Stock Ownership
Rank	Name of Owner	Percentage Ownership
1.	Makumbi Investments Limited	51.0
2.	Capricorn Investment Holdings	44.2
3.	Cavmont and Company SA	
4.	Netherlands Development Finance Company (FMO)	
5.	Zambia National Pensions Scheme Authority (NAPSA)	
6.	White Barry Howard	
7.	319 Others	3.0
	Total	100

== Branch Network ==
As of May 2018, Cavmont Bank maintained a network of branches at the locations:

1. Head Office: Cavmont House, Piziya Office Park, 2374 Thabo Mbeki Road, Lusaka
2. Makumbi Commercial Branch: Cavmont House, Piziya Office Park, 2374 Thabo Mbeki Road, Lusaka
3. Lusaka Square Branch: Anchor House, Sapele Road, Lusaka
4. Tazara Branch: Ground Floor, Tazara House, Corner of Dedan Kimathi Road and Independence Avenue, Lusaka
5. Kalingalinga Branch: B4/29/146, Kamloops Road, Lusaka
6. Garden Branch: 39 Katima Mulilo Road, Lusaka
7. Industrial Branch: Blessing Center, Corner of Vubu Road and Lumumba Road, Emmasdale, Lusaka
8. Mansa Branch: Corner of President Road and Chitimukulu Road, Mansa
9. Mwense Branch: Office No 5, Community Development Block, Mwense
10. Chipata Branch: 4769 Lunkhwakwa Road, Chipata
11. Ndola Branch: 93 Z-Mart Mall, Shop No 7, President Avenue, Ndola
12. Kitwe Branch: 33 Ebenezer Centre, Independence Ave, Kitwe
13. Kitwe Agency: 1306 Chibuluma Road, Industrial Area, Kitwe
14. Chingola Branch: ZRA Building, 11 Kitwe Road, Chingola
15. Chililabombwe Branch: 151 Buntungwa Road, Industrial Area, Chililabombwe
16. Mbala Branch: Independence Avenue, Mbala
17. Mpulungu Branch: Harbour Road, Mpulungu
18. Kasama Branch: Shoprite Centre, Independence Road, Kasama
19. Solwezi Branch: Solwezi
20. Mufumbwe Branch: 1 Main Street, Mufumbwe.

== The Capricorn Group ==
Cavmont Bank is a member of the Capricorn Group of Companies under the umbrella of the parent company Capricorn Investment Holdings, a Namibia-based investment conglomerate. The Group has investment interests in southern Africa, as outlined in the graphic below:

- Zambia

- Cavmont Capital Holdings Zambia Plc. - 44.5% Shareholding
- Cavmont Bank Limited - 44.5% Shareholding

- Namibia

- Bank Windhoek Holdings Limited - 73% Shareholding
- Bank Windhoek Limited - 73% Shareholding
- BW Finance Limited - 73% Shareholding
- Welwitschia Nammic Insurance Brokers Limited - 56.7% Shareholding
- Namib BOU Limited - 73% Shareholding
- Santam Namibia Limited - 18.3%Shareholding
- Sanlam Namibia Holdings Limited - 21.5% Shareholding
- Nammic Financial Services Holdings - 100% Shareholding
- GH Group Employee Share Trust - 16.4% Shareholding

- Botswana

- Capricorn Investment Holdings Botswana Limited - 94.9% Shareholding
- Bank Gaborone Limited - 94.9% Shareholding
- Ellwood Insurance Brokers limited - 94.9% Shareholding
- SmartSwitch Botswana Limited - 47.5% Shareholding
- Capricorn Asset Management Limited - 75.2% Shareholding
- Capricorn Capital Limited - 100% Shareholding
- Cyan ES Limited - 100% Shareholding

== Governance ==
There are six members on the Board of Directors of Cavmont Bank:

1. Guy D.Z. Phiri - Chairman
2. Thinus Prinsool - Vice Chairman
3. Chitupa Muzariri - Director
4. Johan Swanepoel - Director
5. Joseph Ngosa - Director
6. Charles H de B Carey - Managing Director.

== See also ==
- Zambia Economy
- Zambia Banks
- Bank Gaborone
- Bank Windhoek
- Bank of Zambia
