= List of banks in Namibia =

This is a list of commercial banks in Namibia, as updated in late 2024 by the Bank of Namibia.

== List of commercial banks ==
- Bank Windhoek Limited
- First National Bank Namibia Limited (FNB), part of FirstRand Group
- Standard Bank Namibia Limited, part of Standard Bank Group
- Nedbank Namibia Limited, part of Nedbank Group
- Bank BIC Namibia Limited, part of Angola's Banco BIC Group
- Letshego Bank Namibia Limited, part of Letshego Group
- Branch of Banco Privado Atlântico (Lisbon)

== Former commercial banks ==
- Trustco Bank Namibia (2010–2025)
- EBank (2015–2017), a bank with electronic presence but no branches, is now part of FNB.

== See also ==
- Economy of Namibia
- Banking in Namibia
- List of banks in Africa
