= Eheke =

- Settlement
- Location within Namibia
- Coordinates: 17.933°S 15.864°E
- Country: Namibia
- Region: Oshana Region
- Constituency: Ondangwa Rural
- Proclaimed: 2003
- Time zone: UTC+2 (SAST)

Eheke is a settlement in northern Namibia situated at the edge of the Oshana Region near Ondangwa Airport. Eheke has c. 1,150 inhabitants and is situated 15 kilometres (9.3 mi) west of Ondangwa near Omagongati. Eheke was the administrative centre for Ondangwa Constituency, and after a split of this constituency in 2013 it is the centre of the Ondangwa Rural constituency.

It has various privately owned businesses, such as a supermarket, china shop, and many informal vendors selling traditional foods. Eheke is also the circuit cluster center for the school system in the area. Within Eheke, there is an intermediate-level hospital (Eheke Clinic), which is linked to Oshakati Hospital.

Martin Pinehas (Brigadier General Commander of Namibia Air Force) is from Eheke, and many other soldiers.

== History ==
In 1927 a water pond was established by cattle herders in the area. The name of the settlement, Eheke, is derived from this. The Evangelical Lutheran Church in Owambo Kavango, today ELCIN, established a church in 1954. The settlement was proclaimed in 2003.
