= Alpha Namibia Industries Renewable Power =

Alpha Namibia Industries Renewable Power Ltd
- Traded as: NSX:ANE
- Industry: Renewable electricity
- Founded: 2018; 8 years ago
- Headquarters: Windhoek, Namibia
- Website: anirep.com

Alpha Namibia Industries Renewable Power (ANIREP) is a Namibian solar energy company headquartered in Windhoek. The company, an independent power producer (IPP), was founded in 2018. In 2019 ANIREP was listed on the Namibia Stock Exchange, the first alternative energy company to be listed there.

== Acquisitions ==
In April 2020 ANIREP bought 80% shares in HopSol Africa, and in June 2020 the company bought 70% shares in HopSol Power Generation. In April 2025 the company acquired a 45% stake in the Cerim Lüderitz wind power project.

== Projects ==
In 2022 the Khan Solar project was launched near Usakos in the Erongo region. The plant was opened in March 2025, with a speech by Namibian president Nangolo Mbumba. In June 2022 ANIREP received another contract to build and operate the Kokerboom Solar Power Station in southern Namibia. By mid-2025 ANIREP had secured 250 hectares of land and obtained environmental clearance for the solar farm and transmission line.
