= Elia Irimari =

Namibian politician

Elia Kaulifewangali Irimari is a Namibian politician. A member of SWAPO, he has been governor of the Oshana region from 2019 until 2025. Until his appointment as governor, Irimari was the regional councillor for the Ondangwa Urban constituency, where he was first elected in 2015. He served on the council's management committee throughout his term as councillor.

Irimali previously worked as school teacher. During this time he was an active member of the Namibia National Students Organization, and has worked on various youth projects, such as a backyard food garden program aimed at youth. He has also encouraged communities to collect and store water for human consumption and agriculture during the dry season.
