= Khan Solar Power Station =

Solar farm in Namibia

- Country: Namibia
- Location: Usakos, Karibib Constituency, Erongo Region
- Coordinates: 22°04′45″S 15°12′57″E
- Status: Under construction
- Construction began: 2022
- Commission date: 2023 Expected
- Construction cost: US$21 million
- Owner: Access Aussenkehr Solar One Namibia
- Operator: Access Aussenkehr Solar One Namibia

Solar farm
- Type: Flat-panel PV
- Site area: 16 hectares (40 acres)

Power generation
- Units operational: 33000
- Nameplate capacity: 20 megawatts (27,000 hp)

The Khan Solar Power Station, is a 20 megawatts (27,000 hp) solar power plant under construction in Namibia. The project is owned and under development by Access Aussenkehr Solar One Namibia a Namibian independent power producer (IPP), based in Windhoek, the country's capital city. The energy generated here will be purchased by NamPower, the national electricity utility company, which is wholly owned by the government of Namibia. A 25-year power purchase agreement (PPA), governs the terms under which the energy will be sold and bought.

== Location ==
The power station sits on 16 hectares (40 acres) of land that was previously farmland, near the town of Usakos, Karibib Constituency, Erongo Region. Usakos is located approximately 137 kilometres (85 mi), by road, northeast of the city of Swakopmund, the regional capital. Usakos is located about 216 kilometres (134 mi), by road, northwest of Windhoek, Namibia's capital city.

== Overview ==
The solar farm is designed to comprise 33,000 ground-mounted solar panels, 100 inverters and related hardware. The solar panels are mounted on 67 single-axis trackers which tilt the attached panels to track the direction of the sun, thereby maximizing exposure and electricity generated. The 20 megawatts generated at this power station will be purchased by NamPower for integration into the national electricity grid.

The NamPower Khan High Voltage Substation near Usakos, lies adjacent to this solar farm and the farm's output will be directed to that substation for energy evacuation.

== Construction, costs and timeline ==
The cost of construction was reported as 300 Namibian dollars (US$21 million). Construction began in March 2022, with commercial commissioning anticipated in the fourth quarter of 2022. The owner/developer of this power station selected HopSol, based in Windhoek, Namibia, as the engineering, procurement and construction (EPC) contractor.

== Other considerations ==
The PPA between the parties stipulates a contract price of US$0.495 per kiloWatt hour, which is lower than the cost of power derived from fossil-fuel sources. Therefore this solar farm will contribute to reduction of the cost of electricity in Namibia.

== See also ==
- List of power stations in Namibia
- Mariental Solar Power Station
- Kokerboom Solar Power Station
