= Hartlief =

Namibian meat business

Hartlief Corporation Ltd
- Company type: Subsidiary
- Industry: Meat packing
- Founded: 1946; 80 years ago, in Windhoek, Namibia
- Headquarters: Windhoek, Namibia
- Parent: Ohlthaver & List
- Website: https://www.hartlief.com.na/

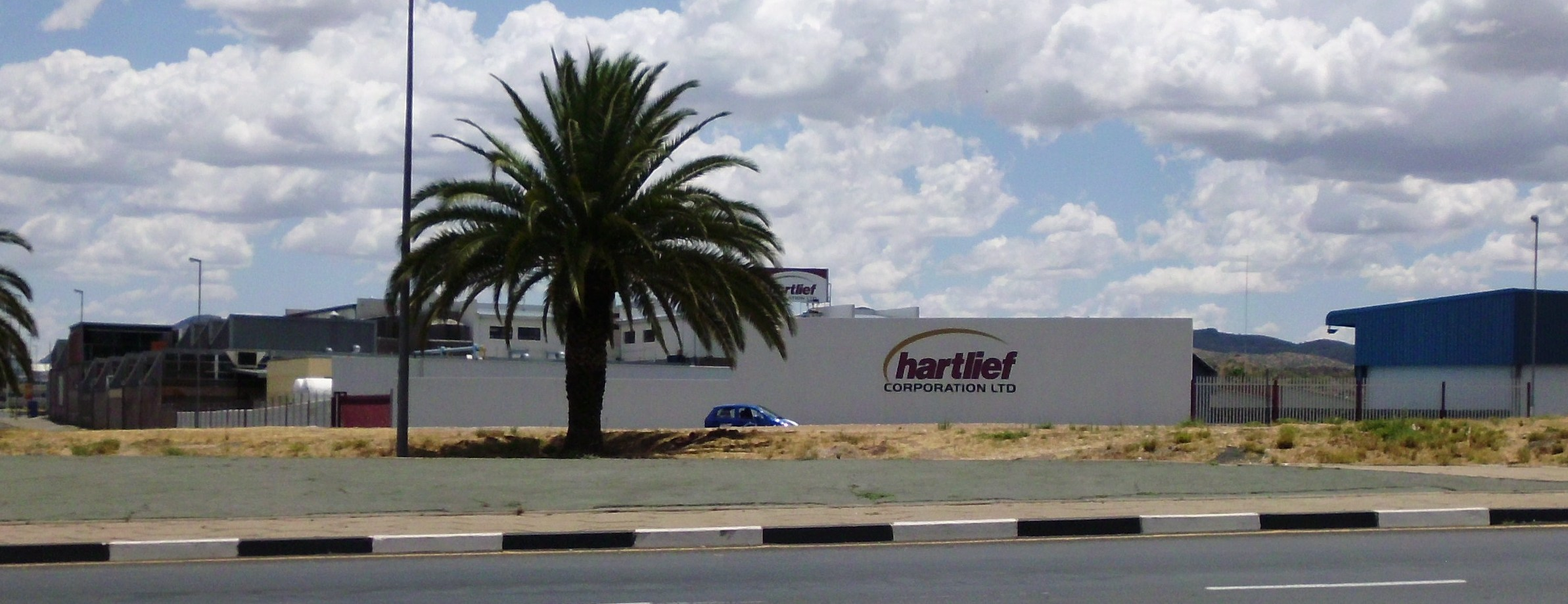
Hartlief's meat plant in the Northern Industrial District of Windhoek

Hartlief Corporation Ltd (commonly Hartlief) is a Namibian meat processing company specialising in the production and sale of fresh and processed meat products. It is part of the Ohlthaver & List (O&L) group of companies. Hartlief supplies both local and export markets, with products ranging from value-added processed meats to fresh cuts.

== History ==
The company traces its roots to a small butchery named Hoffend’s Schlachterei in Windhoek, which was taken over by Karl and Inge Hartlief in the early 1940s. In 1946, the business was renamed Hartlief's Schlachterei.

In 1966 Hartlief relocated to Windhoek’s Northern Industrial Area, merging with neighbouring butcheries Raith and Kandler to form Hartlief Continental Meat Products. A purpose-built factory was constructed in 1971. The company grew through the 1980s, becoming known for its modern meat processing facilities. It began exporting to South Africa in 1987.

In 2005 Hartlief merged with Farmers Meat Market (Ltd) to form Farmers Hartlief Consolidated Meat Products, later renamed Hartlief Corporation Ltd. Through this merger, the Mariental abattoir (formerly Farmers Meat Market) became part of Hartlief. In November 2019, Ohlthaver & List (O&L) acquired a majority (approx. 60%) stake in Hartlief. The same period saw a merger with Windhoek Schlachterei.

The Mariental small-stock abattoir, under Hartlief, resumed operations in October 2022 after being closed since 2020 due to drought impacts. Hartlief also expanded its retail and deli presence (e.g. Hartlief Deli, Hilltop Village) and opened cold-storage and distribution branches (e.g. Ongwediva) to serve northern Namibia.

== Products and Operations ==
Hartlief produces a wide variety of meat and meat-derived products, including fresh beef, lamb, and pork, as well as processed meats such as sausages, smoked and fermented meats (e.g. German salami), cooked vacuum-packed products, cold meats, spreadables (e.g. liver spread) and raw smoked meat.

The company emphasises craftsmanship rooted in the German butcher tradition (Fleischermeister), with a focus on natural ageing of meat ("ripening") and high standards in hygiene and quality control.

Hartlief supplies not only the local Namibian market (retail, wholesale, food service) but also exports processed products into South Africa and other African countries.

Key facilities include the main factory and headquarters in Windhoek, a cold storage/distribution branch in Ongwediva (northern Namibia), the Mariental abattoir, and several retail/deli outlets including the Shop & Bistro in Windhoek and delis in Cape Town.

== Awards and recognition ==
Hartlief has received recognition in Namibia, including being awarded Best Deli in Namibia at the Best of Namibia Awards.
