= Ondangwa Urban =

Electoral constituency in the Oshana region of northern Namibia

Ondangwa Urban constituency (red) in the Oshana Region

Ondangwa Urban is an electoral constituency in the Oshana Region of Namibia. It was created by splitting the former constituency of Ondangwa into a rural and an urban part in August 2013, following a recommendation of the Fourth Delimitation Commission of Namibia, and in preparation of the 2014 general election.

Ondangwa Urban covers an area of 159 km^{2} (61 sq mi). It had a population of 22,822 in 2011 and 17,967 registered voters in 2020. The constituency office is situated in Ondangwa.

== Politics ==
Ondangwa is traditionally a stronghold of the South West Africa People's Organization (SWAPO) party.

The 2015 regional elections were won by Elia Irimari (SWAPO) with 1,518 votes, far ahead of Vincent Asser of the Democratic Turnhalle Alliance (DTA) with 232 votes and Anna Nikanor of the Rally for Democracy and Progress (RDP) with 117 votes. When Irimari was appointed governor of Oshana Region in March 2019, a by-election was set for June. It was won by Leonard Negonga (SWAPO, 1,936 votes), ahead of independent candidate Angeline Immanuel (1,402 votes) and Johannes Martin of the Popular Democratic Movement (PDM, the new name of the DTA) with 326 votes.

Councillor Negonga (SWAPO) was re-elected in the 2020 regional election with 2,921 votes. He won over Olavi Negonga of the Independent Patriots for Change (IPC), an opposition party formed in August 2020, with 2,434 votes. Independent candidate Immanuel came third with 525 votes.

== See also ==
- Administrative divisions of Namibia
