= Mariental Solar Power Station =

Power station in Namibia

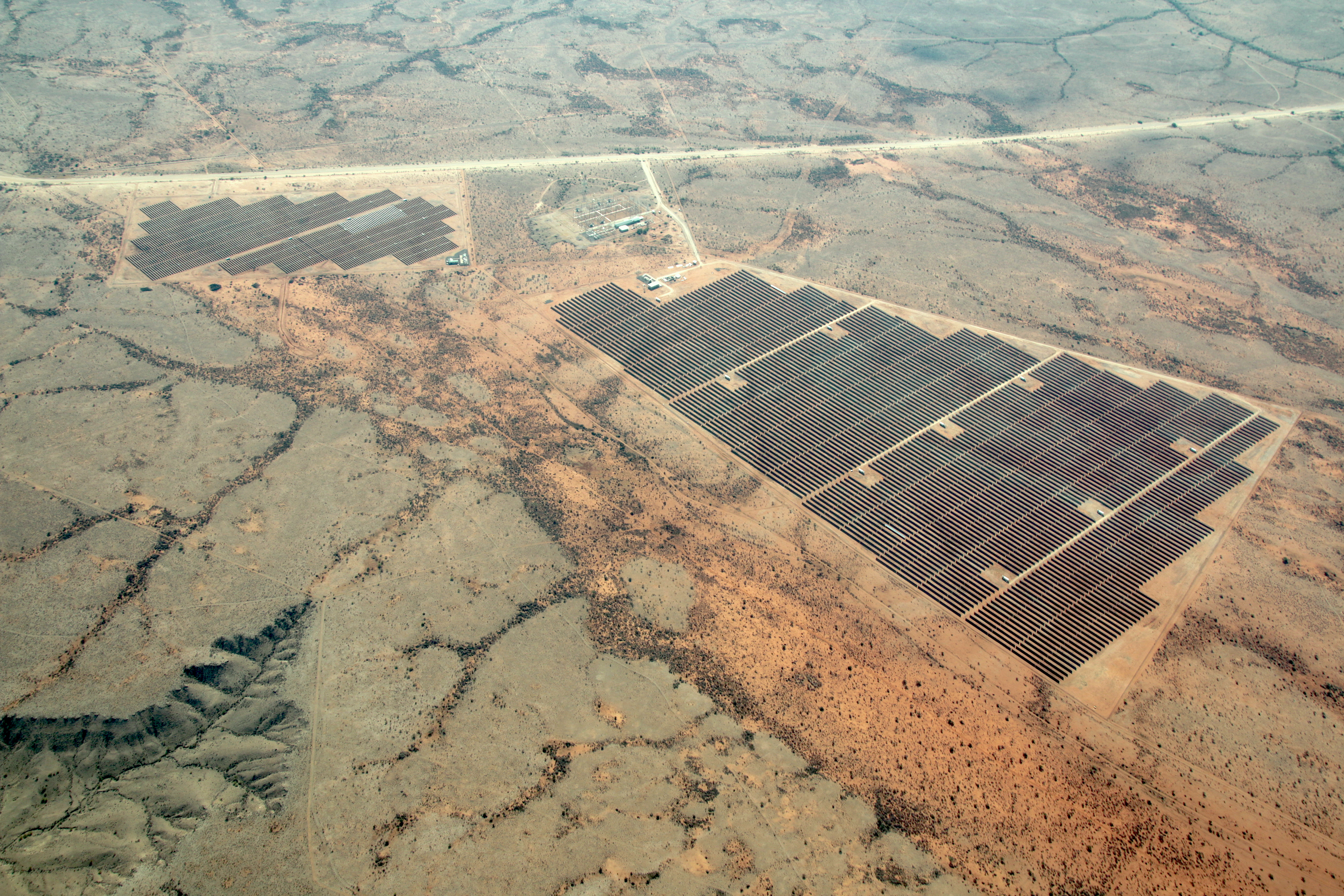
- Country: Namibia
- Location: Mariental, Hardap Region
- Coordinates: 23°39′10″S 18°01′38″E
- Status: Operational
- Commission date: June 2019
- Owner: Alten Energy Consortium
- Operator: NamPower

Solar farm
- Type: Flat-panel PV

Power generation
- Nameplate capacity: 45.5 MW (61,000 hp)

The Mariental Solar Power Station is a 45.5 MW (61,000 hp) solar power plant in Namibia. The project is owned and was developed by a consortium of various IPPs and the Namibian electricity utility company, NamPower.

== Location ==
The power station is located outside of the town of Mariental, approximately 12.5 kilometres (8 mi), southeast of the town centre, along the road to Bulwana (M29).

This is approximately 238 kilometres (148 mi), north of Keetmanshoop, along the B1 highway to Vioolsdrif, at the international border with South Africa.

The power station is located about 276 kilometres (171 mi), southeast of Windhoek, the capital and largest city in Namibia. The geographical coordinates of Mariental Solar Power Station are 24°39'10.0"S, 18°01'38.0"E (Latitude:-24.652778, Longitude:18.027222).

== Overview ==
The power station, which occupies about 100 hectares (250 acres) is designed to have capacity of 45.5 megawatts. The power purchase agreement with the government of Namibia specifies that 37 megawatts are supplied to NamPower, for integration into the national grid.

== Developers ==
The power station was developed by a consortium called Alten Energy Consortium (AEC). The table below illustrates the shareholding in AEC, as of June 2019.

Shareholding In Alten Energy Consortium
Rank	Shareholder	Domicile	Percentage	Notes
1	Alten Renewable Energy	France	51.0	
2	Mangrove	Namibia	12.0	
3	Talyeni Investment	Namibia	6.0	
4	First Place Investment	Namibia	12.0	
5	NamPower	Namibia	19.0	
	Total		100.00	

The three Namibian investment companies are owned by women and represent Namibians, who were previously marginalised.

== Construction costs, and commissioning ==
Construction started in 2018 and the power station was commissioned on 20 June 2019. Standard Bank of South Africa and Proparco, a subsidiary of Agence française de développement (French Development Agency), provided loans and bank guarantees for the development of this renewable energy infrastructure project.

== See also ==
- List of power stations in Namibia
- Khan Solar Power Station
