= Ohlthaver & List =

Namibian company

- Company type: Holding
- Industry: food production, fishing, beverages, information technology, farming, retail trade, property development, marine engineering, steelworks, hospitality
- Founded: 1919
- Headquarters: Windhoek, Namibia
- Key people: Sven Thieme (Executive chairman)
- Number of employees: 5300 + (2015)
- Website: www.ol.na

Ohlthaver & List Group (short O&L or Ohlthaver & List) is the largest private Namibian company group. It has its headquarters in Windhoek's central business district.

The company was founded in 1919 by Carl List and Herman Ohlthaver. It was headquartered near the post office. In 1929 a bigger building was bought on the corner of Peter Müller (today Fidel Castro Street) and Kaiserstraße (today Independence Avenue). This building was soon named Carl List Haus. It is today known as the Alexander Forbes House and still the headquarters of the company group.

The company is in its third generation, and owner of Wernhil Park Mall facilities. It is the largest private-sector employer in the country and has over 5,000 employees.

== Companies ==
O & L include:

- O&L Centre - Property and shopping area
- Broll Namibia - real estate acquisition, management
- Namibia Breweries Limited
- Hangana - fishing and processing
- Namibia Dairies, including the Super dairy farm !Aimab - milk production and processing, milk products
- Model Pick 'n Pay Namibia - Trading Company
- O&L Leisure - Hotels
- Kraatz - Engineering
- Dimension Data Namibia - Information Technology
- Windhoek abattoir (Windhoek Schlachterei) - slaughterhouse
- Eros Air - in-house charter airline
- O&L Project Management
- O&L Nexentury
- O&L Brand X
- O&L Fresh Produce
- BrandTribe
- Hartlief
- O&L Organic Energy Solutions
