= Ondangwa Constituency =

Former constituency in the Oshana Region of Northern Namibia

Coordinates: 17°55′S 15°57′E

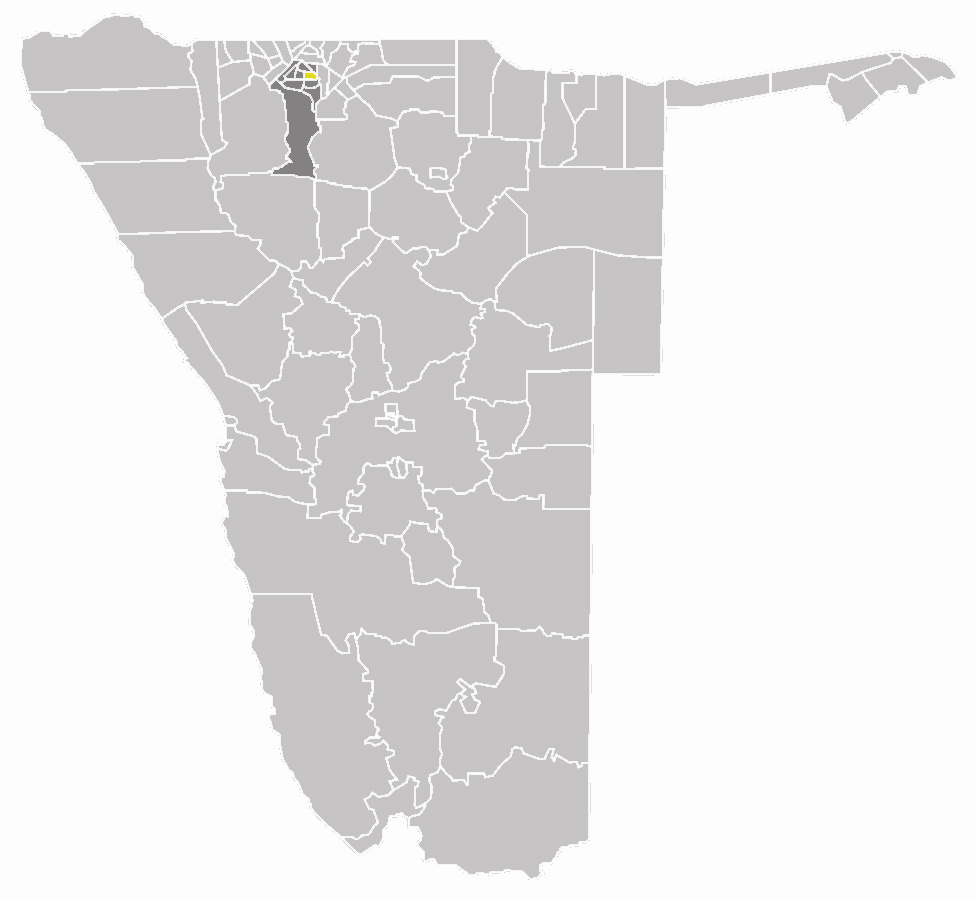
Former Ondangwa Constituency (yellow) in the Oshana Region (dark grey)

Ondangwa Constituency was an electoral constituency in the Oshana Region of Namibia until August 2013. Ondangwa Constituency covered an area of 209 km^{2} (81 sq mi). It had a population of 36,846 in 2011, up from 31,694 in 2001. Its district capital was the town of Ondangwa.

Following a recommendation of the Fourth Delimitation Commission of Namibia, and in preparation of the 2014 general election, the constituency was split into Ondangwa Urban and Ondangwa Rural.

== Politics and governance ==
Ondangwa constituency was traditionally a stronghold of the South West Africa People's Organization (SWAPO) party. In the 2004 regional election SWAPO candidate Ismael Uugwanga received 8,412 of the 8,878 votes cast.

The following people have served as councillors of Ondangwa constituency:

1. Prinse Shiimi (1992–1998)
2. Ismael Uugwanga (1999–2010)
3. Alfeus Abraham (since 2011)
