= AnaCap Financial Partners =

- Trade name: AnaCap
- Company type: Private
- Industry: Private Equity
- Founded: 2005; 21 years ago
- Headquarters: London, England
- Key people: Nassim Cherchali
- Products: Leveraged buyout, Growth capital
- AUM: $2.1 billion (2025)
- Number of employees: <30 (2025)
- Website: www.anacap.com

AnaCap Financial Partners (AnaCap) is a London-based British private equity fund manager that invests in software, technology and services within the European financial sector.

Since January 2023, AnaCap has been led by Managing Partner Nassim Cherchali.

== History ==
AnaCap was established in 2005 as an investment firm focused on financial sector opportunities across Europe.

The firm raised its first fund in 2006, securing commitments of about €300 million.

Subsequent vehicles brought total capital raised to roughly €2.7 billion across several funds and co-investment arrangements.

In 2022, AnaCap’s credit division was separated into a new advisory firm, Veld Capital.

== Notable investments ==
AnaCap invests in mid-sized European businesses in areas such as banking technology, insurance platforms, and payment processing.

Past portfolio companies have included:

- fintus – a German SaaS provider for financial institutions;
- Novia Financial – a UK wealth-management platform acquired in 2020;
- Heidelpay – a German payments business sold to KKR in 2019;
- and Oona Health, a Danish insurance platform divested in 2023.

Other reported transactions have involved firms in Spain, Italy and the Nordic region.
