= WesBank =

South African financial services company

- Type: Subsidiary
- Industry: Finance
- Founded: 1968; 58 years ago
- Headquarters: Johannesburg, Gauteng, South Africa
- Area served: 6 countries in Africa (2026)
- Key people: Robert Gwerengwe (CEO)
- Services: Vehicle and asset finance Personal loans Insurance; Fleet management
- Total assets: ▲ R192.62 billion (2025)
- Total equity: ▼ R2.55 billion (2025)
- Parent: FirstRand
- Website: wesbank.co.za

WesBank is a South African specialist lending and asset finance business. Founded in 1968 and headquartered in Johannesburg, WesBank is a subsidiary of major South African financial services company FirstRand.

The company provides vehicle finance in the passenger and commercial vehicle sectors, as well as fleet management, personal loans, and asset finance.

== History ==
WesBank traces its roots to the establishment of Western Bank, which was formed through the merger of Colonial Bank & Trust and Western Credit, in 1968. Both constituent businesses entered the motor vehicle finance sector in the 1950s.

In 1975, Western Bank was sold by Anglo American Corporation to British banking institution Barclays, which had been attracted by Western Bank's profitability. Western Bank then became Barclays Western Bank. At the time, Barclays National Bank already existed in South Africa. The acquisition of Western Bank by Barclays National banking group in SA gave the group ownership of the country's largest vehicle financing company at the time.

The company began using the WesBank name in 1978.

In 1985, Barclays reduced its stake in Barclays National Bank to 40.4%.

In November 1986, Barclays formally withdrew from South Africa. Its local banking operations were sold to Anglo American Corporation (22.5%), Southern Life (25%), and De Beers (7.5%), with the rest held by smaller shareholders. Barclays National subsequently became First National Bank (FNB), with WesBank becoming a division of FNB.

In 1998, WesBank became part of the newly formed FirstRand group through First National Bank, following the merger of the financial services interests of FNB, Momentum, Southern Life, and Rand Merchant Bank. The following year, WesBank became a division of FirstRand Bank Ltd.

In April 2003, WesBank acquired the vehicle finance leasing book from South African holding company Barloworld Limited. This transferred Barloworld's instalment sale agreements and full-maintenance lease contracts to WesBank.

In 2004, WesBank expanded internationally, establishing the retail vehicle finance business Motor One Finance in Australia, as part of a broader push into international markets.

In 2006, WesBank acquired Welsh vehicle finance company Carlyle Finance from Welsh banking institution Hodge Bank, in a deal worth approximately R3 billion. Carlyle Finance was subsequently renamed MotoNovo Finance.

In 2013, WesBank established a joint venture with Chinese automotive manufacturer Great Wall Motors (GWM), creating GWM Financial Services.

In 2019, WesBank's UK vehicle finance operation, MotoNovo, was integrated into Aldermore, another FirstRand subsidiary.

In 2020, WesBank launched its WesBank App, allowing customers to check affordability, apply for finance, receive approvals, customize deals, and sign contracts digitally. It was described as the first dedicated vehicle finance app of its kind in South Africa. The following year, the app's functionality was integrated into the FNB banking app.

In 2024 WesBank furthered its partnerships with vehicle manufacturers, partnering with GAC Motor to create GAC Motor Finance. The following year, WesBank and MG Motor South Africa partnered to form MG Finance.

In June 2026, WesBank stated its intention to shift away from just finance and into the entire vehicle value chain, including involvement in EV charging infrastructure, potentially offering charging-as-a-service, and working with vehicle manufacturers on charging infrastructure. WesBank said it was already assisting its customers with calculating the portion of their fleet that should ideally be electrified.

== Operations ==
As of 2026, WesBank provides the following services:

- Passenger vehicle finance — financing new and used cars, motorcycles, and other vehicles
- Commercial vehicle finance — trucks, buses, and other commercial vehicles
- Asset finance — financing equipment and other business assets
- Fleet management — financing and managing vehicles for businesses
- Personal loans and other financial products, in some of its markets

== See also ==
- Banking in South Africa
- Transport in South Africa
- Automotive industry in South Africa
