= Bank BIC Namibia =

Commercial bank in Namibia

Coordinates: 22°34′36.5″S 17°05′08.5″E

Bank BIC Namibia Limited
- Type: Subsidiary
- Industry: Banking; Financial services
- Founded: 13 July 2015; 11 years ago
- Headquarters: Windhoek, Namibia
- Key people: LP Crawford; CEO; Jaime Galhoz Pereira; Chairperson
- Products: Loans; Checking; Savings; Investments; Debit cards
- Revenue: ▼ N$26.9 million (2018)
- Total assets: N$374 million (2018)
- Number of employees: 54 (2023)
- Parent: Bank BIC Group
- Website: www.bankbic.na

Bank BIC Namibia Limited (Bank BIC Namibia) is a commercial bank in Namibia. It is licensed by the Bank of Namibia (BoN), to operate and trade in the country. The bank is a subsidiary of the Bank BIC Group, a financial services conglomerate based in Angola, with banking subsidiaries in Angola, Portugal, Cape Verde and Namibia, and with a representative office in South Africa.

== Overview ==
The bank operates as a retail bank, serving individuals, small and medium-sized enterprises (SMEs) and large corporations, as well as non governmental organisations. As of December 2018, the bank's total assets were N$374 millIon (approx. US$22.36 million). Shareholders’ equity in 2016 was N$266.77 million (approx. US$14.2 million).

== History ==
The bank was licensed as a commercial bank in Namibia, in July 2015. It opened for business in June 2016, with one branch at the headquarters building. Later it opened a branch in the Prosperita Industrial Area, south of Windhoek and another branch in the city of Walvis Bay, on the Atlantic Ocean coast.

== Ownership ==
Bank BIC Namibia Limited is a 100 percent subsidiary of the Bank BIC Group, headquartered in Angola, with subsidiaries in three African countries, South Africa (representation office), Namibia and Cape Verde; and one European country, Portugal - Banco BIC Português S.A. In July 2017, the group's affiliate in Portugal changed its name from "Banco BIC Portugal" to "Banco EuroBIC", due to court order, as there was infringement on the name of "Banco BIG Portugal".

EuroBIC s anti money laundering weakness were already known in 2015.

== Branch network ==
The bank's headquarters is at Dr. Agostinho Neto Road, Ausspannplatz, Windhoek, in the central business district of the country's capital city. As of April 2020 the bank maintains branches at these locations:

1. Head Office: Dr. Agostinho Neto Road, Unit 6 & 5, Ausspann Plaza, Windhoek. (Main Branch)
2. Prosperita Branch: Gold Street, Prosperita Industrial Area, Windhoek.
3. Walvis Bay Branch: 12th Road, Walvis Bay.
4. Rundu Branch: Eugene Kakukuru Street, Shop GF029, Rundu Mall, Rundu
5. Ongwediva Branch: Unit 123, Oshana Mall, Ongwediva.

== Governance ==
The bank is governed by a five-person board of directors. The chairman of the board is one of the non-executive directors. As of January 2019, the chairperson is Jaime Pedro Galhóz Pereira substituting Fernando Mendes Teles, and as vice-chairman Hugo Miguel Mendes Teles. The Board Executive Team is formed by Lindsay Peter Crawford - CEO, and Mauro Rogério as executive director.

== See also ==
- List of banks in Namibia
