= First National Bank (South Africa) =

Commercial bank in South Africa

- Type: Division
- Traded as: JSE: FSR
- Industry: Commercial banking
- Founded: 1838; 188 years ago
- Headquarters: Sandton, Gauteng, South Africa
- Area served: South Africa, Botswana, and Namibia
- Key people: Harry Kellan (CEO)
- Products: Financial services
- Revenue: ▲ R 127 billion (2024)
- Net income: ▲ R 39.7 billion (2024)
- Total assets: ▲US$131.3 billion (2024)
- Number of employees: 40,000 (2024)
- Parent: FirstRand
- Website: fnb.co.za

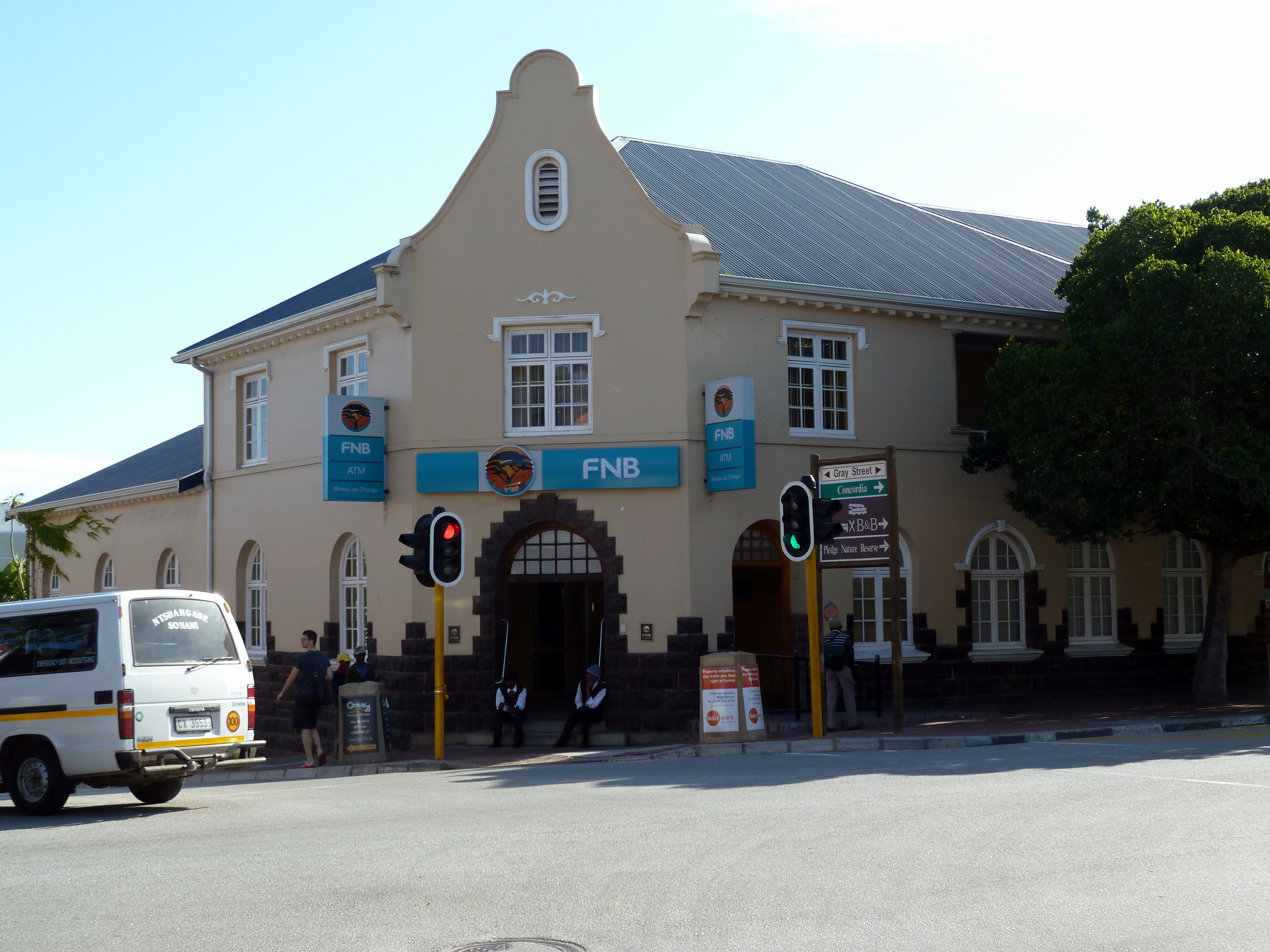
An FNB branch in Knysna, Western Cape

First National Bank, commonly referred to as FNB, is a major South African commercial bank. Founded in 1838 and headquartered in Johannesburg, FNB is a division of FirstRand, a large, publicly-traded financial services conglomerate.

== Overview ==
FNB is one of the three major divisions of the FirstRand Group, with the others being Rand Merchant Bank and WesBank. The company maintains banking subsidiaries, which it owns wholly or in part, in Botswana, Mozambique, Namibia, South Africa, Eswatini, Tanzania, Zambia, Ghana, India, Lesotho and Guernsey.

== History ==
FNB is the oldest bank in South Africa. It traces its origins back to the Eastern Province Bank, which was formed in Grahamstown in 1838. At that time the bank financed the wool export boom in the district. By 1874, the bank had four branches – in Grahamstown, Middelburg, Cradock and Queenstown.

Due to a recession, the bank was bought out in 1874 by the Oriental Bank Corporation (OBC). However, as a result of financial difficulties that the Oriental Bank Corporation was experiencing in India, it decided to withdraw from South Africa and thus the Bank of Africa was formed in 1879 to take over the OBC's business in South Africa.

At about the same time, the government of the South African Republic desired to create a local commercial bank, due to the discovery of gold in Barberton and the Witwatersrand. The government thus created a bank through a concession agreement.

The task of the bank was to focus primarily on financing agricultural development. A state mint was also established as part of the concession. The Nationale Bank der Zuid-Afrikaansche Republiek Beperk (National Bank of the South African Republic Limited) was registered in Pretoria in 1891 and opened for business on 5 April of the same year. After the conclusion of the Second Anglo-Boer War in 1902, the name of this bank was changed to the National Bank of South Africa Limited.

Due to another recession, the Bank of Africa was bought out by the National Bank in 1912, which had already bought out another bank, the National Bank of the Orange River Colony in 1910. The Natal Bank, which was founded in 1854 to fund the Natal Colony's sugar industry, also suffered financial difficulties and was taken over in 1914. By this time, the National Bank was one of the largest banks in South Africa.

However, by the early 1920s, the National Bank was suffering from bad debt and heavy losses. It consequently merged with the Anglo-Egyptian Bank and the Colonial Bank in 1925 to form Barclays Bank (Dominion, Colonial and Overseas). In 1971 Barclays restructured its operation and its South Africa operation was renamed Barclays National Bank Limited.

Due to a disinvestment campaign against South Africa because of its apartheid policies, Barclays was forced to reduce its shareholding and sold its shareholding in the bank in 1986. The bank was renamed "First National Bank of Southern Africa Limited" on 30 September 1987 and became a wholly South African owned and controlled by Anglo-American Corporation.

The FirstRand Group was established in 1998, by the merger of banking interests of the Anglo-American banking interests. First National Bank of South Africa, Rand Merchant Bank and Momentum Insurance & Asset Management where brought under the group control. FirstRand is listed as a "locally controlled bank" by the South African Reserve Bank, the national banking regulator of South Africa.

In 2011, the group had total assets valued at US$90.3+ billion (ZAR:698 billion) with subsidiaries in seven sub-Saharan countries and in Australia and India. Expansion plans in another six African countries were underway.

In 2025, the group's total assets had grown to R2.59 trillion.

== Controversies ==
=== CIEX Report ===
In 1999, the First National Bank was mentioned in the 'Ciex Report' that summarised a two-year long investigation into a loan issued by the South African Reserve Bank to Bankorp (a bank later taken over by ABSA). Other banks were drawn into the controversy. Supporters of the CIEX Report characterised this as the theft of R26 billion from the state during the apartheid era. A specific allegation is that FNB unlawfully received hundreds of millions of Rands from the SARB, disguised as 'lifeboats' for covering bad loans.

The then-Public Protector, Busisiwe Mkhwebane, issued a report which in essence validated the CIEX report and ordered the Reserve Bank to take remedial action. However, the Reserve Bank took the report on review to the high court, which set aside the report and ordered Mkhwebane to pay the costs of the Reserve Bank in her personal capacity (by the time the matter came to court Mkhwebane had consented to the report being set aside, and argued only that costs should not be awarded against her personally). The Constitutional Court confirmed the decision of the high court to set aside the Public Protector's report unanimously, and by a majority that Mkhwebane should pay costs personally.

The mishandling of this case was one of the factor's that led to Mkhwebane's impeachment. Despite these findings, the controversy was revived after major South African Banks closed the bank accounts of Sekunjalo group companies. Sekunjalo and newspapers that it owns criticised these banks on many grounds, including their alleged malfeasance in this case.

=== Safety deposit box victims ===
During September 2015 it was reported in the Sunday Times that FNB stated "a small number" of safety deposit boxes were stolen from the Sunnyside branch in Pretoria.

Later in the same year, 360 boxes were stolen in a daring overnight break-in at the Randburg, Johannesburg branch.

On New Year's Eve, the third and final break-in occurred at the FNB Parktown branch. It was reported at the time that the value was approximately R1.7 Million out of 30 deposit boxes in the branch.

In 2018, reports surfaced that 60 victims were going ahead with a damages claim against First National Bank (South Africa) reported to amount to R121 Million.

== See also ==
- FirstRand
- WesBank
- Absa Bank Limited
- Standard Bank
- List of banks in South Africa
- Economy of South Africa
