= Cattles =

British consumer finance company

Cattles Limited
- Company type: Limited company
- Industry: Consumer finance
- Founded: 1927
- Fate: Liquidation
- Headquarters: Batley, UK
- Key people: Margaret Young, Executive chairman
- Revenue: £822.2 million (2007)
- Operating income: £165.2 million (2007)
- Net income: £114.7 million (2007)
- Website: cattles.co.uk

Cattles Limited was a British consumer finance company based in Batley, West Yorkshire. It was listed on the London Stock Exchange and was a former constituent of the FTSE 250 Index.

The company entered liquidation in September 2016.

== History ==
The Company was founded by Joseph Cattle in 1927 in Hull. It was first listed on the London Stock Exchange in 1963. In the 1990s it developed the Shopacheck brand. In 1990 it acquired Compass Credit and went on to buy Welcome Financial Services in 1994, The Lewis Group in 1997 and Dial4aloan in 2001.

In June 2009 in an effort to improve liquidity, Welcome Car Finance, the company's car financing arm was closed. This followed the announcement made by Cattles in May 2009 that the company was to axe 1000 jobs. The closure meant that 130 jobs were lost.

In March 2009 three directors – James Corr (Finance Director), Ian Cummine (chief operating officer) and Adrian Cummings (Compliance and Risk Director) were suspended pending an investigation by Deloitte into accounting irregularities.

PricewaterhouseCoopers agreed a request to resign as auditors of the company. Grant Thornton were appointed in their place. A forensic review completed by Freshfields Bruckhaus Deringer and Deloitte concluded that "the former executive directors of Cattles and certain of the former senior executives of WFS, over a period of time, had provided incomplete and misleading information and documents and/or failed to escalate matters of concern relating to impairment" and that "certain executives had provided a range of presentations, documents and verbal reassurances to the non-executive directors that everything was entirely as it should have been and that there was no reason for concern."

Paul Felton-Smith, who had experience in financial restructuring, was appointed as Finance Director in June 2010.

Cattles was acquired by Bovess Limited on 28 February 2011, as part of a High Court sanctioned scheme of arrangement. Cattles was then delisted from the London Stock Exchange on 7 March 2011. In September 2016 the company went into liquidation.

== Operations ==
The company offered loans to "sub-prime" customers who are often refused credit by more mainstream lenders such as high-street banks. Since such customers are considered to be more risky, the interest rates charged tended to be significantly higher than those charged by banks. In June 2004, the National Consumer Council referred a Super-Complaint regarding the Home Collected Credit industry to the Office of Fair Trading. The Office of Fair Trading published a consultative paper which raised concerns about concentration of market share between the four largest providers, including Cattles. It also mentioned a number of business practices and customer characteristics which could hinder market competitiveness.
