= Quiver Tree Forest =

Natural monument in Namibia

Coordinates: 26°33′07″S 18°10′05″E

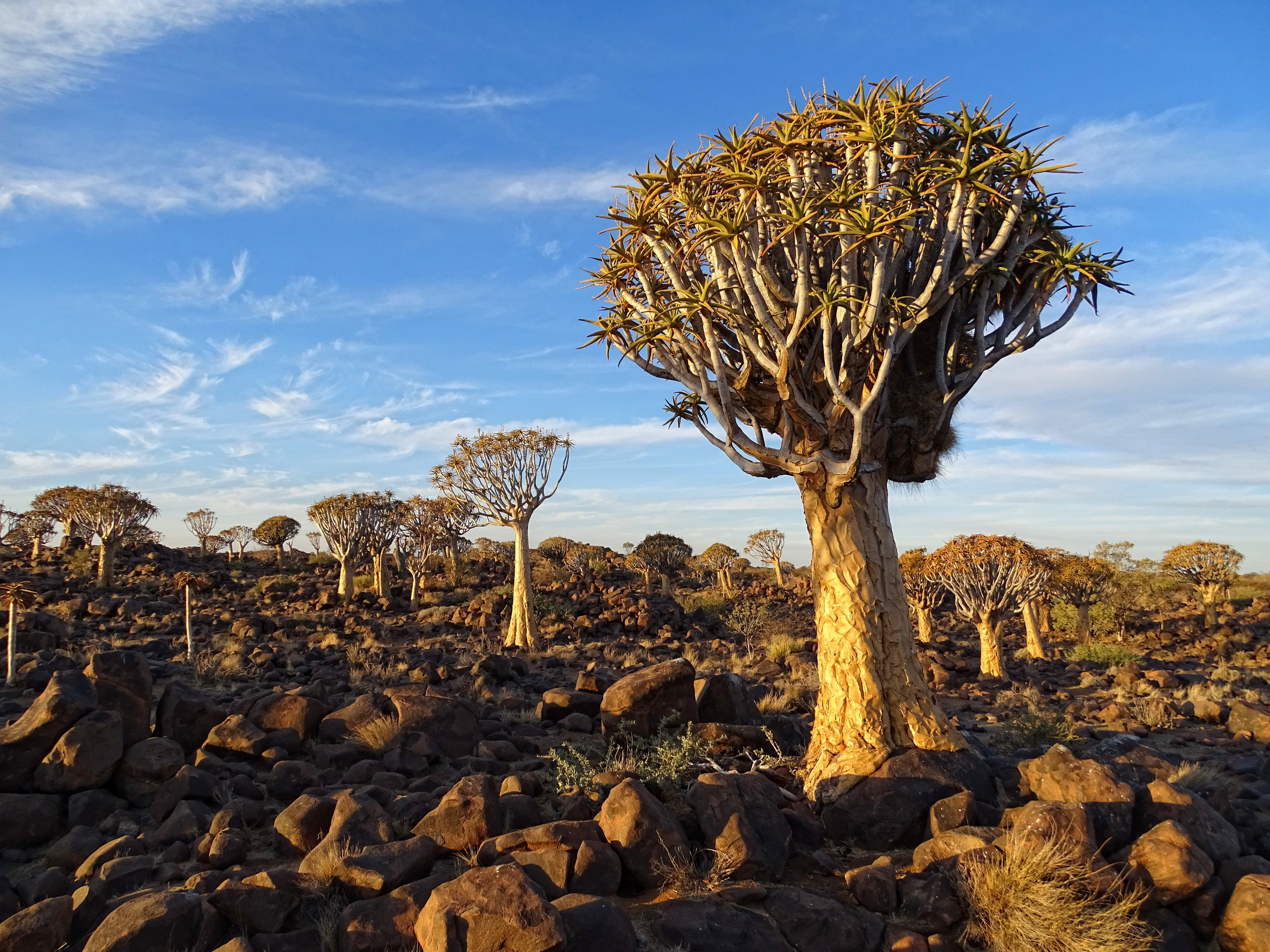
Quiver tree forest

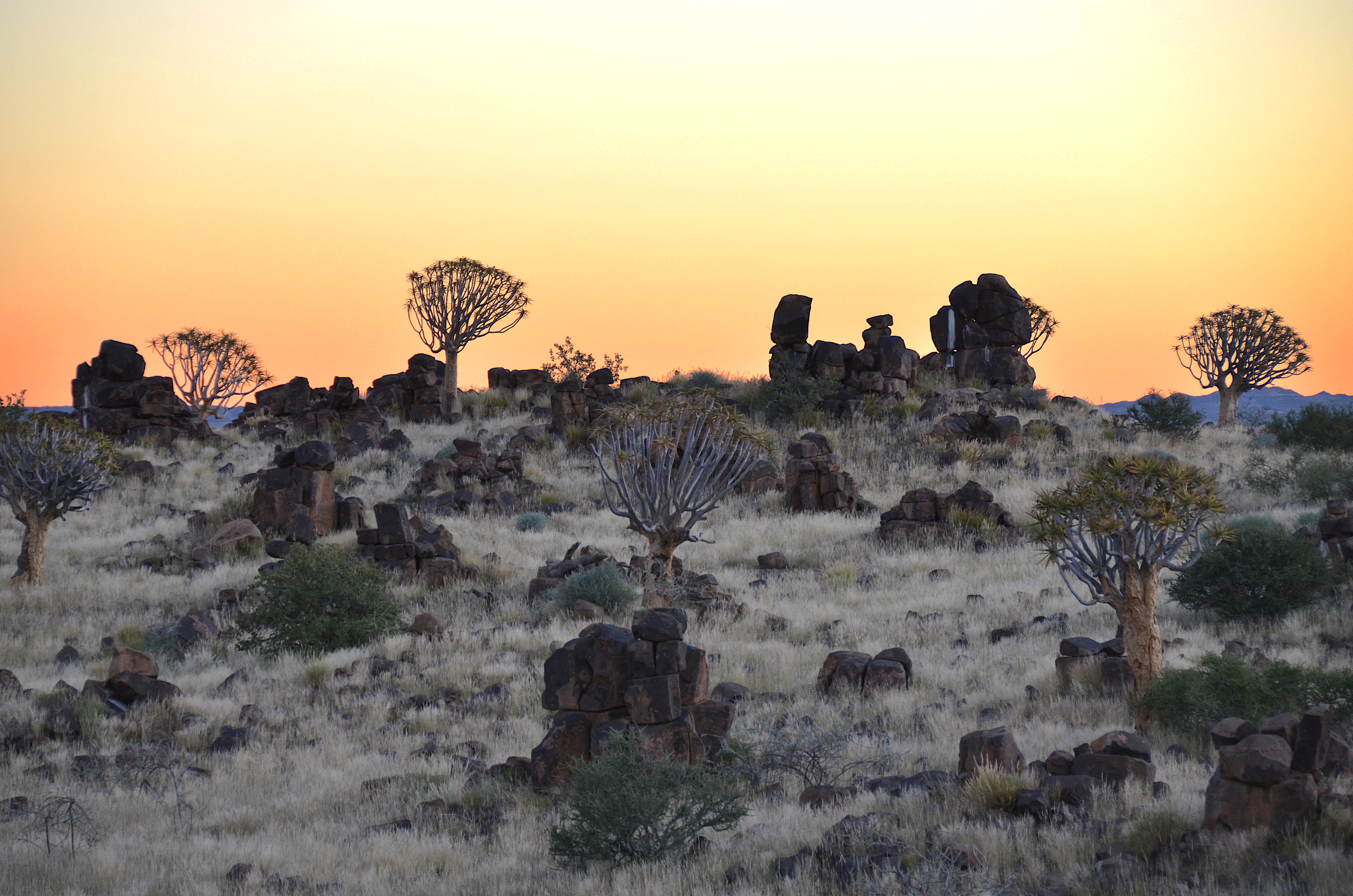
Dolerite rocks and quiver trees

The Quiver Tree Forest (Kokerboomwoud in Afrikaans) is a forest and tourist attraction of southern Namibia about 14 km north-east of Keetmanshoop on the road to Koës. It comprises about 250 specimens of Aloidendron dichotomum, a species that is also locally known as the quiver tree (Afrikaans: kokerboom) because the San people traditionally used its branches to make quivers. The forest was declared a national monument of Namibia in 1995.

The forest is home to rock hyraxes living amongst the rocks.

== Other Quiver Tree Forests ==
Although Aloe dichotoma is common in southern Africa, there are only a small number of natural quiver tree forests. Another is located near at Gannabos, near Nieuwoudtville in the Northern Cape. Others have been created by humans, including one in the Karoo Desert National Botanical Garden of Worcester, South Africa.
