= Ondangwa Rural =

Electoral constituency in the Oshana region of northern Namibia

Coordinates: 17°55′S 15°57′E

Ondangwa Rural Constituency (red) in the Oshana Region

Ondangwa Rural is an electoral constituency in the Oshana Region of Namibia. It was created by splitting the former constituency of Ondangwa into a rural and an urban part in August 2013, following a recommendation of the Fourth Delimitation Commission of Namibia, and in preparation of the 2014 general election.

Ondangwa Rural covers an area of 159 km^{2} (61 sq mi). It had a population of 14,024 in 2011 and 7,682 registered voters in 2020. The administrative centre of the constituency is the settlement Eheke.

== Politics ==
Ondangwa is traditionally a stronghold of the South West Africa People's Organization (SWAPO) party. Alfeus Abraham, since 2011 leading the disestablished Ondangwa Constituency, has been councillor of Ondangwa Rural since its inception.

In the 2015 local and regional elections, Alfeus Abraham won uncontested after no opposition party nominated a candidate. Councillor Abraham was again reelected in the 2020 regional election, winning with 2,170 votes over Armas Ntinda of the Independent Patriots for Change (IPC), an opposition party formed in August 2020, with 944 votes.
