= Natal Bank Building =

Bank building in Johannesburg, South Africa

Coordinates: 26°12′18″S 28°02′27″E

- Bank Museum
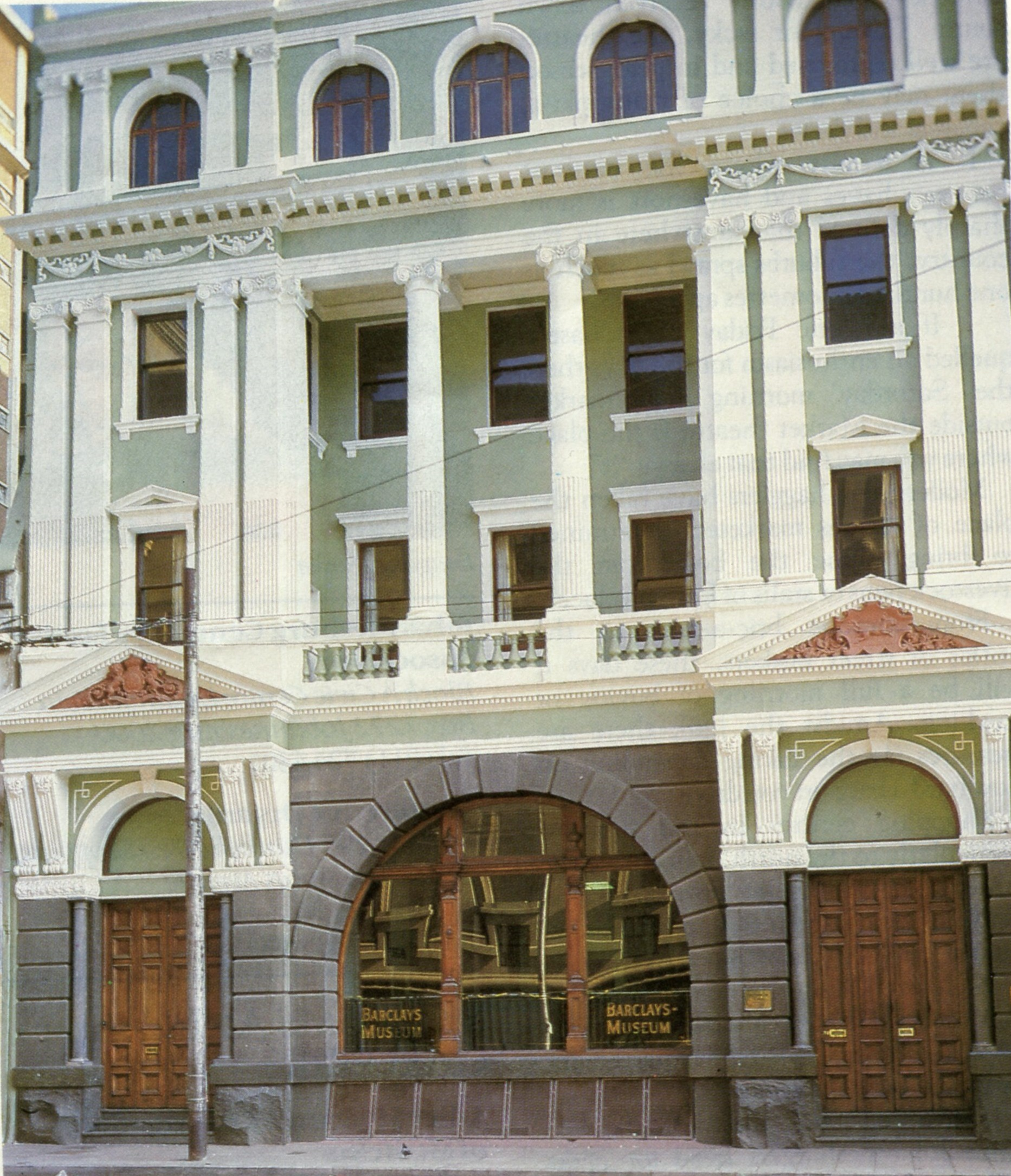
- Natal Bank Building, 90 Market Str Johannesburg.
- Interactive map of the Natal Bank Building area

General information
- Status: Completed
- Location: Johannesburg, South Africa
- Completed: 1903

Technical details
- Floor count: 3 plus basement

Design and construction
- Architects: Carter & McIntosh

The Natal Bank Building is situated on Stand 194 (previously 756) at 90 Market Street (now known as Albertina Sisulu Road) in the city of Johannesburg. Natal Bank was the second bank to open a branch in the city after Standard Bank.

The Natal Bank's first bank building was erected on the same site in 1891 by M. B. Houge, architect. It was a generous height single storey building of brick with a projecting pediment, and was demolished to make way for the larger existing building. Ideally situated a block away from the Stock Exchange and the National Bank of the South African Republic, the bank prospered and two years later plans were accepted for a new four-storeyed building and vaults.

A new design was prepared by architects Carter and McIntosh in 1889, but the second Anglo-Boer War hampered the building operations. Soon after peace had been restored, McIntosh and Moffat were commissioned to redesign the building, which was eventually occupied on 24 August 1903. This is the building as it currently stands. At the time, the building cost £29,847 to construct and has an area of ~460m2.

== Design ==
The building is Neo-Classical in style, reflecting the stylistic preference of the period. Van Der Waal describes it as follows: ‘Attractively proportioned, this building was divided horizontally and vertically into three sections according to the classicist tradition. A strikingly broad arched window, similar to those used by the Richardson School in America, was placed at ground level in the conspicuous middle section with its Ionic columns’.

== Construction ==
The building is supported by a steel frame, with socle (plinth) of dressed granite, marble columns and plastered brickwork. The roof is pitched, which distinguishes it from the multitude of later, taller buildings which had flat concrete roof construction. Timber-framed sliding sash windows provide elegant fenestration.

The basement walls were constructed in brick and measure between 450mm and 500mm thick. All internal partitions were in solid brickwork and the pitched roof was supported on timber trusses. The ground floor is supported on rolled steel joists at 2.2m centres with concrete barrel vault arches spanning between. Tongue and groove flooring was the floor finish in most of the building, except the banking hall which had a marble floor. The banking hall had a ceiling of ornate plasterwork, other ceilings were in pressed metal sheet.

== History ==
‘The buildings that were erected on the south side of Market Street overlooking the old Market Square were all typically Victorian – but solid and impressive for a young and growing place like Johannesburg. They demonstrated, even at that early stage, the sense of confidence and permanence that investors of capital had in Johannesburg and its wonderful deposits of gold.’ Much like flagships, the bank buildings asserted the presence of the financial empires in the town's forum. Foremost amongst these was the first Natal Bank building (1891), 90 Market Street, with arched windows and central pediment.

Being only the second bank branch built in the city, Natal Bank was a significant building at the time and its modest three storeys were characteristic of the earlier City Centre buildings, which were later replaced with larger, higher rise buildings.

The Natal Bank was taken over by National Bank in 1914, which in turn was taken over by Barclays Bank in 1926. From 1978, it became the Barclays Bank Museum and then in 1988, the FNB Museum. In 1989, it was donated by FNB Bank to the Mary Moffat Museum.

Other than being a working bank and a bank museum, the building also had other uses during its history: In 1961 it was a storage and rehearsal centre for a theatrical group known as the Bank Players, whose performances raised money for charity. In 1963, it housed the Intelligence Department and the Foreign Branch under the management of Colin Waterson.

== Recent history ==
In 1986, the Natal Bank building was the venue for an exhibition, entitled “Veld to Finance”, to mark the city's centenary. In 1989, the building required repairs to address water penetration, and this work was successfully undertaken.

From 2000 to 2010, the Natal Bank Building was owned by the Johannesburg Heritage Trust. Following restoration, the Central Johannesburg Partnership leased half the building with the balance leased to the Johannesburg Development Agency.

The building was put up for sale in 2011 and is currently in private ownership, with media monitoring and brand intelligence company, Ornico Group, as the buildings main tenant.

== Heritage Status ==
The Natal Bank Building was designated a Provincial Heritage Site in 1990 and is historically and culturally significant for the following reasons:

- The Natal Bank Building is a building of high architectural quality
- It is the oldest bank building in Johannesburg and is of sufficient age to qualify as a heritage building
- It is considered an outstanding historical building in a prime location opposite City Hall and a local landmark
- The Natal Bank Building was culturally and socially significant when it was used as a Museum
- The Natal Bank Building has exceptionally fine detailing in high quality materials
- It retains many of its original high quality interior features which illustrate its primary use as a working bank
