= Standard Bank Namibia =

Commercial bank in Namibia

Coordinates: 22°37′16″S 17°05′31″E

Standard Bank Namibia Limited
- Company type: Public
- Traded as: NSX: SNO
- Industry: Banking; Finance
- Founded: August 15, 1915; 110 years ago
- Headquarters: 1 Chasie Street; Kleine Kuppe; Windhoek; Namibia
- Key people: Herbert Maier (Chairperson); Mercia Geises (CEO, managing director)
- Products: Commercial and Investment banking
- Net income: NAD:361,882,000 (US$:25,576,700) (2020)
- Total assets: NAD:33,309,509,000 (US$2,354,220,000) (2020)
- Number of employees: 1,900+ (2019)
- Website: standardbank.com.na

Standard Bank Namibia Limited, commonly referred to as Standard Bank Namibia, is a Namibian commercial bank. It is licensed, supervised and regulated by the Bank of Namibia, the central bank and national banking regulator. Since 19 November 2019, the stock of the holding company of this bank, going by the name Standard Bank Namibia Holdings Limited is listed on the Namibian Stock Exchange (NSX), where it trades under the symbol SNO.

SNO and its subsidiaries are members of the Standard Bank Group, a financial services conglomerate, headquartered in South Africa, with subsidiaries in 20 African countries, and with total assets worth nearly US$143 billion, as of 31 December 2020.

== Overview ==
Standard Bank Namibia Limited is a large financial services organisation in Namibia. As of 31 December 2020, SNO had assets valued at NAD:33,309,509,000 (US$:2,354,220,000), with shareholders' equity of NAD:3,720,927,000 (approximately: US$262,984,000). At that time, the institution employed in excess of 1,500 people in 63 interlinked brick-and-mortar branches and maintained 372 automated teller machines.

== Ownership ==
The shares of stock of Standard Bank Namibia Holdings Limited are listed in the Namibian Stock Exchange, where they trade under the symbol SNO. The ownership in the company stock is as illustrated in the table below:

Standard Bank Namibia Holdings Limited Stock Ownership
Rank	Name of Owner	Percentage Ownership	Notes
1	Standard Bank Group	75.9	
2	Public and Private Investors via the NSX	24.1	

== Governance ==
As of May 2021, the chairman of the Board of Directors of Standard Bank Namibia Holdings Limited, is Herbert Maier, a non-executive director. The managing director and chief executive officer is Mercia Geises.

== See also ==
- Economy of Namibia
- Standard Bank of South Africa
- List of banks in Namibia
