= Sven Thieme =

Namibian businessman (born 1968)

Sven Thieme (born 8 February 1968) is a Namibian businessman. He is currently a chairman of Ohlthaver & List, the largest private company in Namibia.

== Education and training ==
Thieme attended Deutsche Höhere Privatschule Windhoek and graduated with the German Abitur in 1987. He graduated as an auditor in 1991 at the University of Cape Town, South Africa. He completed his articles at Deloitte & Touche in Cape Town.

== Business career ==
He took over in 2002 after the death of his grandfather and the son of the founder for Werner List, the CEO of Ohlthaver & List. He has worked since 1998 in the company, and became general manager between 2001 and 2002. He also sits several supervisory boards of subsidiaries. Previously, he was from 1994 to 1998 as an auditor for Deloitte & Touche in Luxemburg. In 2004, he was in charge of establishing the Development Bank of Namibia. In 2010 Thieme was in the Supervisory Board of the public broadcaster Namibian Broadcasting Corporation. Since 2014 he presided over the Namibia Chamber of Commerce and Industry. He is considered as one of the most influential Namibians.

== Recognition ==
Thieme was conferred the Most Distinguished Order of Namibia: First Class on Heroes' Day 2014.
