= Namibia Chamber of Commerce and Industry =

- Abbreviation: NCCI
- Type: Financial Organization
- Headquarters: Windhoek, Namibia
- Members: 2500 (2013)
- Official language: English
- President: Sven Thieme
- Main organ: Board of Governors
- Website: www.ncci.org.na

The Namibia Chamber of Commerce and Industry is the industrial and Chamber of Commerce in Namibia. It is headquartered in the capital Windhoek. In March 2013, the Chamber had about 2,500 members.

== History ==
The Namibian Chamber of Commerce and Industry was established in 1990 as Namibia National Chamber of Commerce and Industry (NNCCI) in Windhoek. In 1998, the chamber was renamed and transferred to a legally independent, private-sector institution. As part of this realignment, the concept of regional chambers were implemented.

== Tasks and Structure ==
NCCI is a non-profit organization whose mission is to represent the Namibian business enterprises from all economic sectors. It was on the basis of the Companies Act, Act no. 32 of 1973 established as a state institution. Additional areas of responsibility of the NCCI counts:

- Legal Contact
- Organizing and conducting conferences and trade shows
- Issues of trade
- Information gathering and reporting
- Further education

Supreme establishment of the Namibian Chamber of the General Assembly, which convenes twice a year. The Board of Directors is the highest supervisory organ. It is composed of 14 members. The Chairman is the President, currently Sven Thieme. Another body of the Chamber is to represent the regional chambers. In daily business, the NCCI is led by the Secretariat. This is the Chief Executive Officer, currently Tarah Shaanika.

The Namibia Chamber of Commerce and Industry is represented at regional and local level through regional chambers. These deal mainly with local issues. Regional chambers are (as of April 2011) in Arandis, Gobabis, Katima Mulilo, Keetmanshoop, Luderitz, Omaruru, Ongwediva, Oranjemund, Otjiwarongo, Rehoboth, Rosh Pinah, Rundu, Swakopmund, Tsumeb, Walvis Bay and Windhoek.

== Membership ==
The Namibian Chamber of Commerce and Industry has no system of compulsory membership. Membership is open to all Namibian companies but differs for micro, small and medium-sized enterprises and large corporations. In addition, there are special memberships for diplomats and associated facilities.
