= Namibia Securities Exchange =

Stock exchange in Windhoek, Namibia

Coordinates: 22.5811°S 17.0947°E

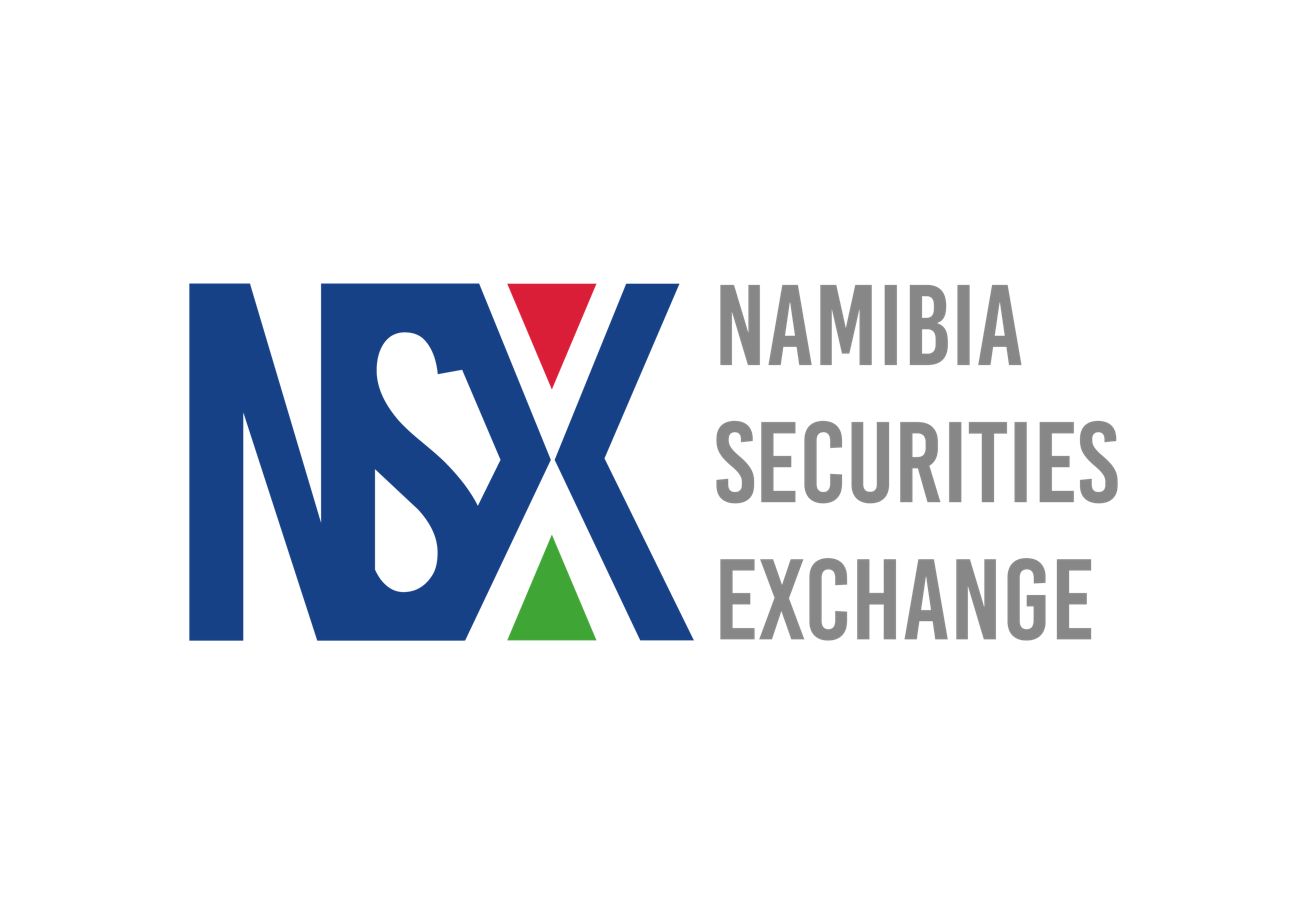
- Type: Stock Exchange
- Location: Windhoek, Namibia
- Founded: 18 January 1904 (old); 30 September 1992 (current)
- Owner: Members
- Key people: Grant Marais (Chairman); Tiaan Bazuin (CEO)
- Currency: Namibian dollar
- No. of listings: 53 which include 11 Commodity ETF’s & 10 ETNs (2025)
- Market cap: N$2 trillion (May 2025)
- Website: nsx.com.na

The Namibia Securities Exchange (NSX; Afrikaans: Namibiese Effektebeurs; German: Börse Namibia) is the only exchange in Namibia. Based in Windhoek, it is one of the largest exchanges on the African continent. It has a partnership with JSE in neighbouring South Africa. The NSX is only open on weekdays, and trades continuously from 09:00 to 17:00 (WAT), excluding public holidays.

The exchange operates under a license from the Namibian non-banking financial regulator NAMFISA. The exchange is regulated by the Stock Exchanges Control Act (1985 and 1992).

== History ==
The first exchange in Namibia was founded in Lüderitz (previously known as the Lüderitz Stock Exchange). It opened at the start of the 1900s as a result of the diamond rush, which brought hundreds of prospectors to the desert, who then built settlements in the area. After a few years, the old exchange closed when the diamond rush ended and there were no more business opportunities.

== Relaunch ==
The idea of a second Exchange for Namibia was started as people planned to build an independent economy ahead of the 1990 national independence from South African occupation. The government gave the idea the go ahead and full legislative support, while funding came from 36 leading Namibian businesses, representing the full cross-section of interested parties in developing capital markets, who became founder members by donating N$10,000 each to act as start-up capital for the first three years of the exchange. The official launch, by then Finance Minister Gert Hanekom, was on September 30, 1992, and trading began the next day in the shares of Nictus, a local firm already listed in Johannesburg, and on that day dual-listed in Namibia. At that stage there was only one stockbroker, who also acted as consultant. Since then, five more stockbrokers have joined and annually a year the NSX sets examinations for new stockbrokers.

== Listed companies ==
As of January 2025, there are 59 companies listed on the exchange. These include 47 companies with more than one listing, of which 39 companies are listed on the JSE in South Africa. The Namibia Securiites Exchange has twelve local listings.

| Company | Sector |
|---|---|
| Anglo-American | Industrial Metals |
| Paladin Energy | Mining |
| Namibia Breweries Ltd | Beverages |
| Oceana Group Ltd | Food Production |
| Nictus Holdings | Trade |
| Truworths International | Trade |
| Shoprite Holdings | Food Trade |
| Capricorn Investment Group Ltd | Banking |
| FirstRand Ltd | Banking |
| FirstRand Namibia Ltd | Banking |
| Nedbank Group | Banking |
| Standard Bank Namibia Group | Banking |
| SBN Holdings Ltd | Banking |
| Santam Ltd | Insurance |
| Momentum Group Limited | Life Insurance |
| Old Mutual Ltd | Life Insurance |
| Sanlam Ltd | Life Insurance |
| Oryx Properties Ltd | Real Estate |
| Vukile Property Fund Ltd | Real Estate |
| Investec Ltd | Finance |
| Namibia Asset Management Ltd | Finance |
| PSG Financial Services Ltd | Finance |
| Stimulus Investments Ltd | Finance |
| Tadvest Limited | Finance |
| TrustCo Group Holdings Ltd | Finance |
| Letshego Holdings (Namibia) Ltd | Finance |
| B2Gold Corporation | Mining |
| Andrada Mining Ltd | Mining |
| Bannerman Resources Ltd | Mining |
| Deep Yellow Ltd | Mining |
| Celsius Resources Limited | Mining |
| Forsys Metals Corp | Mining |
| Elevate Uranium Ltd | Mining |
| Koryx Copper Inc | Mining |
| Reconnaissance Energy Afr Ltd | Mining |
| Mobile Telecommunications Ltd | Telecommunications Services |
| Paratus Namibia Holdings Ltd | Telecommunications Services |
| Alpha Namibia Industries Renewable Power Ltd | Alternative Electricity |
| 1nvestPalladium | ETF |
| 1nvest Gold | ETF |
| 1nvest Platinum | ETF |
| Satrix S&P Namibia Bond | ETF |
| New Gold Issuer Ltd | ETF |
| New Gold Palladium | ETF |
| New Gold Platinum | ETF |
| Satrix MSCI EMG Markets | ETF |
| Satrix MSCI World Feeder | ETF |
| Satrix Nasdaq 100 Prtf | ETF |
| Satrix S&P 500 Feeder | ETF |
| FNB ETN on ALPHAC SEP25 | ETN |
| FNB ETN on AMAZONC SEP25 | ETN |
| FNB ETN on APPLEC SEP25 | ETN |
| FNB ETN on BERKSHC NOV25 | ETN |
| FNB ETN on FACEBC SEP25 | ETN |
| FNB ETN on MICROC SEP25 | ETN |
| FNB ETN on ISMSCIC SEP25 | ETN |
| FNB ETN on NETFLC SEP25 | ETN |
| FNB ETN on TESLAC SEP25 | ETN |
| FNB ETN on SRIWLDC AUG26 | ETN |

== See also ==
- List of African stock exchanges
