= Bank Windhoek =

Commercial bank in Namibia

Bank Windhoek Limited
- Company type: Subsidiary
- Traded as: NSX: CGP
- Industry: Banking
- Founded: 1982; 44 years ago
- Headquarters: Windhoek, Namibia
- Area served: Namibia
- Key people: Johan Swanepoel (Chairman); Baronice Hans (Managing Director)
- Products: Financial services; Loans; Transactional; Savings; Investments
- Revenue: ▲ N$1.21 billion (2022)
- Operating income: ▲ N$2.69 billion (2022)
- Net income: ▲ N$1.48 billion (2022)
- Total assets: ▲ N$46.84 billion (2022)
- Total equity: ▲ N$5.80 billion (2022)
- Number of employees: 1,704 (2022)
- Parent: Capricorn Group
- Website: www.bankwindhoek.com.na

Bank Windhoek Limited (Bank Windhoek) is a commercial bank in Namibia, which is licensed by the Bank of Namibia (BoN) to operate in the country. It provides financial services to its clients, which include personal, commercial and Small and Medium-sized Enterprise (SME) banking and accounts.

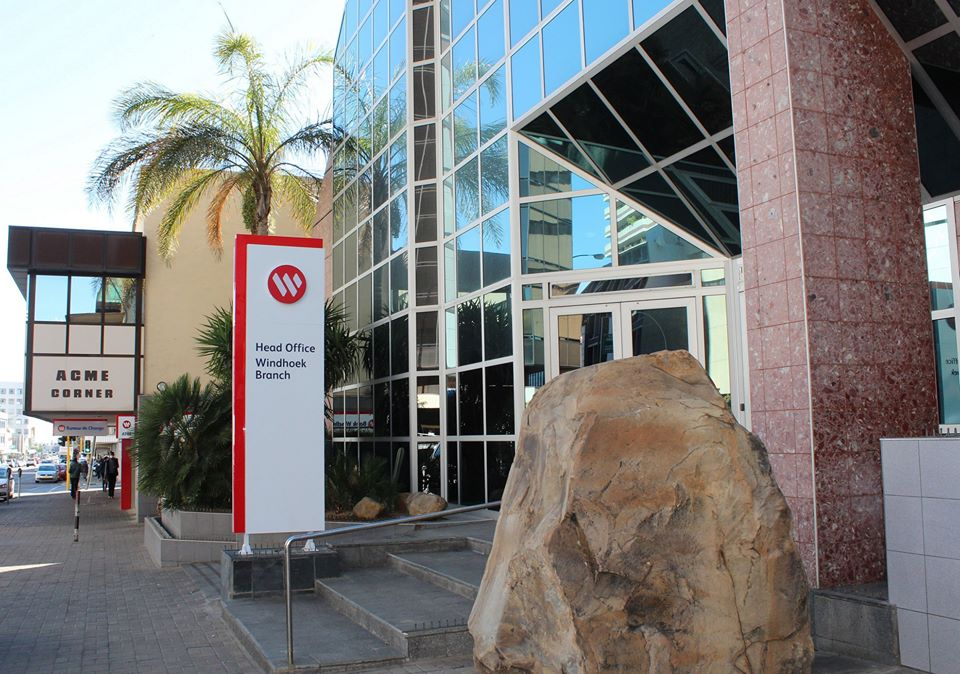
Bank Windhoek headquarters on Independence Avenue, Windhoek

Bank Windhoek also offers foreign exchange services throughout its branches and through a joint venture with American Express, which has various outlets in Namibia. While being an autonomous Namibian company, the bank also provides international banking services through direct liaison with financial centres and institutions worldwide.

== History ==
Bank Windhoek was founded in 1982 when a group of entrepreneurs, led by Koos Brandt, took over eight local branches of the Volkskas Bank. The bank opened its first branch in Karasburg the same year it was founded. In 1990, the bank merged with Boland Bank and Trust Bank, and opened a branch in Walvis Bay. The bank opened its first Windhoek branch in 2001.

== Branch network and localised ATMs ==
Bank Windhoek has the largest branch network and footprint across Namibia. As of June 2022, it has 51 branches, agencies and specialist branches countrywide. The bank also has a corporate and institutional banking division with offices in Windhoek, Oshakati and Walvis Bay.

The bank also has 149 ATMs across Namibia and 253 Bank Windhoek Cash Express ATMs installed at various merchant locations countrywide in partnership with ATM Solutions Namibia.

Bank Windhoek is also the only bank in Namibia to offer ATMs with local language options.

== Ownership structure ==
Bank Windhoek, a fully owned subsidiary of the Capricorn Group, is the largest entity under the umbrella of Capricorn Investment Group Limited, a Namibian financial services group listed on the Namibian Stock Exchange, with interests in banking, insurance, asset management, investments and microfinance. It is the only systemically important bank in Namibia that is not foreign-owned.

Until May 2017, Capricorn Group was a subsidiary of Capricorn Investment Holdings Limited (CIH). At present, the two largest shareholders of Capricorn Group are Capricorn Investment Holdings (CIH), which holds a 41% shareholding in Capricorn Group and the Government Institutions Pension Fund, which holds 25.9%.

Bank Windhoek contributes more than 95% of the total income of Capricorn Group and represents more than 89% of the group's net asset value. While BW Finance, a subsidiary of Bank Windhoek, is the vehicle through which the group does its micro lending business, which is a separate entity, as per regulation.

Capricorn Group Shareholders:
Entity	Shares
Capricorn Investment Holdings Ltd (CIH)	40.7%
Government Institutions Pension Fund (GIPF)	26%
Nam-mic Financial Services Holdings (Pty) Ltd	9.9%
Capricorn Group Employee Share Trusts	3.4%
4650 Other Shareholders hold the remaining	20%

== Directors ==
The directors of Bank Windhoek as of 1 July 2017 are:
Title / Role:	Name and Surname:
Chairman	Johan Swanepoel
Managing Director	Baronice Hans
Non-executive director	Koos Brandt
Non-executive director	Thinus Prinsloo
Independent non-executive director	Gida Nakazibwe-Sekandi
Independent non-executive director	Brian Black
Independent non-executive director	Frans du Toit
Independent non-executive director	Gerhard Fourie

== See also ==
- Economy of Namibia
- Bank Gaborone – Commercial Bank in Botswana
- List of banks in Namibia
