= FirstRand =

South African financial service provider

FirstRand Limited

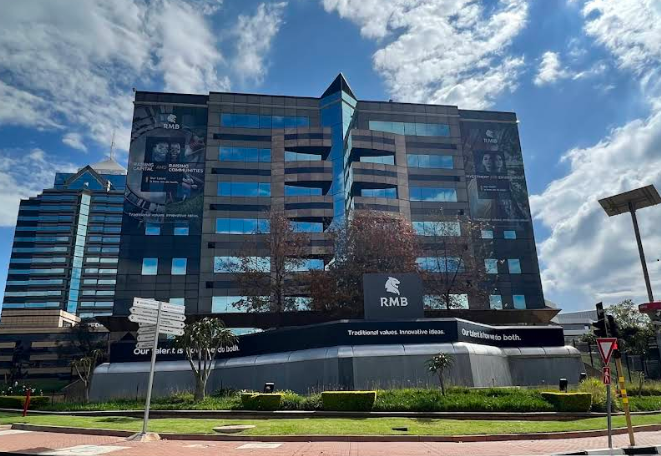
- Headquarters in Johanesburg
- Type: Public
- Traded as: JSE: FSR
- Industry: Banking and finance
- Founded: 1838; 188 years ago (founded as the Eastern triocrees Province Bank, now known as the First National Bank); 1998; 28 years ago (establishment of the group)
- Headquarters: Johannesburg, South Africa
- Key people: Johan Burger (chairman); Mary Vilakazi (group CEO)
- Products: Lending, transactional services, investments, insurance, and asset management
- Operating income: ▲ R 92.54 billion (2024)
- Net income: ▲ R 28.24 billion (2024)
- Total assets: ▲ R 1.72 trillion (2024)
- Total equity: ▲ R 129.16 billion (2024)
- Number of employees: 48,059 (2022)
- Divisions: First National Bank; Rand Merchant Bank; WesBank; Ashburton
- Website: firstrand.co.za

FirstRand Limited, also referred to as FirstRand Group, is the holding company of FirstRand Bank, and is a financial services provider in South Africa. It is one of the financial services providers licensed by the Reserve Bank of South Africa, the national banking regulator. FirstRand Group is Africa’s largest listed financial services institution, with over R1.7 trillion in assets under management (AUM) across Africa, the UK, and India.

The company operates through various divisions, including First National Bank (FNB) for commercial banking, Rand Merchant Bank (RMB) for corporate and investment banking, WesBank for vehicle and asset financing, and Ashburton for asset management.

== Overview ==
Listed on the JSE and the Namibian Stock Exchange, FirstRand Limited is one of the largest financial institutions in South Africa, and provides banking, insurance and investment products and services to retail, commercial, corporate and public sector customers. In addition to South Africa, the group operates in eight key African countries: Botswana, Namibia, Swaziland, Lesotho, Zambia, Mozambique, Tanzania, Ghana and Nigeria. FirstRand Bank has branches in London, Guernsey and India.

FirstRand executes its strategy through a portfolio of financial services franchises. These include Rand Merchant Bank (RMB), a corporate and investment bank; First National Bank (FNB), a commercial bank; WesBank, an instalment finance provider; and Ashburton Investments, an asset management business.

The group has its headquarters in Johannesburg, South Africa. It is one of the five largest banking groups in South Africa and sub-Saharan Africa.

== History ==
The FirstRand group's history traces back to the 1970s as an investment bank. The group as currently was established on 1 April 1998, through a merger of the financial services interests of Anglo American Corporation of South Africa Limited (now Anglo American plc) and RMB Holdings (RMBH) in order to achieve the objective of a unified financial services grouping.

These financial services interests were First National Bank Holdings, Momentum Life Assurers Limited (Momentum, now part of MMI Holdings) and the Southern Life Association Limited (Southern Life), all of which were listed on the JSE. FNB and Southern Life were constituted as wholly owned subsidiaries of Momentum, which was the vehicle to affect the merger. Momentum changed its name to FirstRand Limited and was listed on the Johannesburg Stock Exchange on 25 May 1998, with Anglo American and RMB Holdings holding 20.43% and 25.03% of the authorised capital of FirstRand respectively. Anglo American has since shed its entire shareholding.

Post-merger events saw the merging of Rand Merchant Bank and FNB to form FirstRand Bank Limited, with the two units remaining to trade as divisions of FirstRand Bank Limited, and the transfer of Momentum's insurance business into that of Southern Life, to form FirstRand Insurance Limited.

FirstRand is listed as a "locally controlled bank" by the South African Reserve Bank, the national banking regulator. The group has subsidiaries in South Africa and in Botswana, Mozambique, Namibia, Lesotho, Tanzania, Ghana, Zambia, Nigeria and the UK.

In November 2012, the Central Bank of Nigeria issued the first merchant banking licences in more than a decade to RMB Nigeria and another local firm.

In July 2022, First National Bank of Tanzania was officially acquired by Exim Bank Tanzania.

In 2024, a UK court ruled against Close Brothers Group and FirstRand for mis-selling loans to car buyers. They had been paying commission to car dealers for recommending their loans, without the dealers revealing the commissions to the car buyers. FirstRand disagreed with the court's findings.

In October 2025, FirstRand officially took over the assets and customers of HSBC's South African branch.

== Member companies ==
FirstRand Group holds its investments through five main subsidiaries. These subsidiaries and their subsidiaries are members of the FirstRand Group and include, but are not limited to, the following:

- FirstRand Bank Limited – South Africa provides a comprehensive range of retail, commercial, corporate and investment banking services in South Africa and offers niche products in certain international markets. FirstRand Bank has three major divisions which are separately branded:
  - First National Bank is the retail and commercial bank division of FirstRand Bank.
  - Rand Merchant Bank is the corporate and investment division of FirstRand Bank.
  - WesBank is the instalment finance division of FirstRand Bank, and is South Africa's largest provider of vehicle finance
- In addition to the three divisions, FirstRand Bank has branches in London, India and Guernsey, and representative offices in Kenya, Angola, Dubai and Shanghai.
- FirstRand Investment Holdings Proprietary Limited (FREMA) – 100% shareholding – South Africa – A holding company for FirstRand Group's financial services companies in the rest of Africa and other emerging markets. Subsidiaries held through FREMA include:
  - FirstRand International (Mauritius) – 100% shareholding – Mauritius – A holding company for African investments
  - First National Bank Botswana Limited – 69% shareholding – Botswana – A commercial bank providing retail and corporate banking. The bank is listed on the Botswana Stock Exchange.
  - First National Bank of Ghana Limited – 100% shareholding – Ghana – A commercial bank providing retail and corporate banking
  - First National Bank Lesotho Limited – 100% shareholding – Lesotho – A commercial bank providing retail and corporate banking
  - First National Bank Mozambique Limited – 90% shareholding – Mozambique – A commercial bank providing retail and corporate banking
  - First National Bank Namibia Limited – 58% shareholding – Namibia – A commercial bank providing retail and corporate banking. The bank is listed on the Namibia Stock Exchange.
    - OUTsurance Namibia – 51% shareholding – Namibia – An insurance company in Namibia. Held through First National Bank Namibia giving the group overall control of 30%. OUTsurance Holdings holds 49% of the venture.
  - First National Bank Swaziland Limited – 100% shareholding – Swaziland – A commercial bank providing retail and corporate banking
  - First National Bank Zambia Limited – 100% shareholding – Zambia – A commercial bank providing retail and corporate banking
  - Rand Merchant Bank Nigeria – 100% – shareholding – Nigeria – A corporate and investment bank in Nigeria
- FirstRand International Limited (Guernsey) – 100% shareholding – holding company for UK banking business:
  - Aldermore Bank Plc – 100% shareholding – UK specialist bank
- FirstRand Investment Holdings Proprietary Limited (FRIHL) – 100% shareholding – South Africa – A holding company for FirstRand Group's other non-banking activities. Subsidiaries held through FRIHL include:
  - Direct Axis SA (Pty) Ltd – 100% shareholding – South Africa – A specialist financial services firm
  - RMB Private Equity Holdings (Pty) Ltd – 96% shareholding – South Africa
  - RMB Private Equity (Pty) Ltd – 93% shareholding – South Africa
  - RMB Securities (Pty) Ltd – 100% shareholding – South Africa
  - RMB Morgan Stanley (Pty) Ltd – 50% shareholding – South Africa – A joint venture with Morgan Stanley
  - RMB Australia Holdings Limited – 100% shareholding – Australia – An investment bank in Australia
- FirstRand Investment Management Holdings Limited – 100% shareholding – South Africa – the holding company for the group's asset management activities
  - Ashburton Fund Managers (Pty) Limited – 100% shareholding – South Africa
  - Ashburton Investor Services (Pty) Limited – 100% shareholding – South Africa
  - Ashburton Management Company (Pty) Limited – 100% shareholding – South Africa
  - Ashburton Investments International Holdings Limited – 100% shareholding – South Africa
  - RMB CIS Management Company (Pty) Limited – 100% shareholding – South Africa
- FirstRand Insurance Holdings (Pty) Ltd – 100% shareholding – South Africa – This is the holding company for FirstRand's insurance businesses. Subsidiaries held through FirstRand Insurance Holdings include:
  - FirstRand Life Assurance – 100% shareholding – South Africa
  - FirstRand Short-Term Insurance Limited – 100% shareholding – South Africa
  - FirstRand Insurance Services Company (FRISCOL) – 100% shareholding – South Africa

== Ownership ==
FirstRand is listed on the Johannesburg Stock Exchange and Namibian Stock Exchange. Its major shareholders include:

FirstRand Limited stock ownership
Rank	Name of owner	Percentage ownership
1	RMB Holdings^{1}	34.1
2	Remgro^{2}	3.9
3	FirstRand's BEE partners	5.2
4	Institutional and private investors on the JSE Limited	56.8
	Total	100.00

1→ RMB Holdings large shareholders include directors and management of RMBH with 10.4%, Remgro with 28.2% shareholding in RMBH and Royal Bafokeng Holdings with a 15% stake in RMBH.

2→ Based on its direct and indirect shareholding in FirstRand, Remgro's effective control of the group is 13.36%.

== Awards ==
- Best Banking Performer, South Africa in 2016 by Global Brands Magazine

== See also ==
- List of banks in South Africa
- List of banks in Africa
- Rand Merchant Insurance Holdings
