= Hospitals in Switzerland =

Healthcare institutions in Switzerland

- Number of establishments (2023): 275 (260 hospitals, 15 birthing centers)
- Total beds: 37,925
- Annual hospitalizations: 1.48 million
- Total personnel (FTE): 185,775
- Share of health costs: 35.7% (32.6 billion CHF in 2022)
- Main regulatory framework: Federal Health Insurance Act

Hospitals in Switzerland operate under a federal framework with cantonal administration, combining public and private establishments to provide comprehensive medical services.

As of 2023, Switzerland had 275 hospitals and birthing centers with a total capacity of 37,925 beds, serving approximately 1.5 million patients annually. These facilities employed 185,775 full-time equivalent staff and generated total charges of 36.1 billion CHF, representing 35.7% of the country's total healthcare costs.

== History ==
=== Medieval period ===
The earliest hospitals in Switzerland emerged during the Middle Ages, following the model of charitable institutions that had developed in the Byzantine Empire from the 4th century onward. These medieval establishments served a diverse population including the indigent, elderly, homeless, orphans, disabled individuals, beggars, pilgrims, women in childbirth, and the sick without resources. They provided lodging, food, and care, typically for short durations.

The oldest documented hospitals in Switzerland were located in abbeys such as Saint-Gall in the 8th century and Saint-Maurice in the 10th century, as well as in episcopal cities including Chur in the 8th century, Lausanne in the 9th century, and Sion in the 12th century. By 1200, ten establishments had been documented, including early foundations of hospital orders such as those at Bourg-Saint-Pierre, Roche, and Vevey, which were connected to the Great St Bernard Hospice.

Between the 13th century and the Reformation, 224 new hospitals were established, including 97 leprosariums. The expansion reflected both urban development and the growing influence of hospital orders such as the Hospitallers of Saint John of Jerusalem, who established twelve facilities in Swiss territory.

=== Ecclesiastical and municipal administration ===
Initially, hospital administration was predominantly under ecclesiastical authority, including abbeys, military or hospital orders, and secular high clergy. However, this pattern changed significantly after 1300. Measures taken by Pope Clement V at the Council of Vienne (1311-1312) contributed to this evolution through the decretal Quia contigit, which prevented the misappropriation of charitable funds by forbidding hospitals from being granted as benefices and recommending the transfer of their management to communes, thus beginning the municipalization of hospitals.

Cities founded by the House of Zähringen, particularly Bern and Fribourg, were notably successful in achieving municipal control over their hospitals. In Bern, when the Teutonic Knights gained excessive power over the lower hospital founded by the bourgeoisie in 1307, the mayor and council transferred it outside the city walls to another parish and diocese. In Fribourg, the hospital founded by the bourgeoisie in 1248 near Notre-Dame church was immediately placed under the authority of the Petit Conseil, which appointed the hospitaller, rector, and other staff.

=== Reformation to 18th century ===
The Protestant Reformation provided an opportunity for reorganizing assistance, which had been primarily an ecclesiastical prerogative. Several bourgeoisies took control of hospital affairs, sometimes centralizing various hospitals under a single authority. This occurred in Winterthur (1523), Lausanne (1528), Bern with the Inselspital (1531), Zurich (1531), Geneva (1535), and Neuchâtel (1539). The secularization of clergy property significantly benefited bourgeois hospitals.

During the Ancien Régime, hospital management became the responsibility of urban ruling classes. The administrator position became an essential step in the bourgeois cursus honorum. Hospitals were very wealthy institutions possessing numerous capitals and extensive land holdings, derived from medieval hospital properties acquired by bourgeoisies and, in Protestant territories, from the secularization of clergy property.

The 18th century witnessed a second major hospital reform, primarily architectural and organizational in nature. A proliferation of hospital construction and reconstruction projects occurred, with new buildings erected as public edifices designed to mark the urban landscape and materialize bourgeois power. Hospitals were constructed or renovated in Avenches (1701), Bern (Inselspital, 1724; grand hospital, 1742), Vevey (1738), Brugg (1750), Schwyz (1752), Nyon (1761), Porrentruy (1765), Lausanne (1771), Neuchâtel (1782), Aarau (1787), Solothurn (1788), Winterthur (1789), and La Neuveville (1792).

=== 19th and 20th centuries ===
==== Functional transformation ====
Around 1800, hospitals remained multifunctional institutions serving as primary urban public assistance establishments. Social upheavals of the early 19th century led to a rapid increase in urban indigent populations. Faced with poor housing conditions and lacking alternative solutions, assistance administrators increasingly reserved hospitals for the sick, relocating former residents (elderly, needy, physically and mentally disabled) to new specialized institutions.

Medical advances through bedside patient observation and pathological anatomy enabled physicians to understand disease progression, defined by symptom clusters. After 1850, patient admission to hospitals followed medical criteria. Surgery progressed more than other medical branches during this period. Disinfectants, asepsis, and anesthesia enabled increasingly bold operations.

Hospital medicine acquired unprecedented effectiveness in the late 19th century, supported by scientific discoveries. The thermometer, X-rays, and laboratory analyses refined diagnostics. Controlled administration of new medications could only be performed in hospitals. Beyond pharmaceutical means, physiotherapy, massages, and corrective gymnastics were also employed.

==== Financing evolution ====
Historic hospitals were typically foundations endowed with land wealth, income from rents and payments in kind, supplemented by public assistance payments and private donations. During the division of property between state and communes under the Helvetic Republic, hospital wealth went to the communes. The state assumed responsibility for costs incurred by individuals with cantonal citizenship rights.

During industrialization, employers and workers were encouraged to join health insurance funds (nearly 500 existed in Switzerland by 1865), which concluded contracts with hospitals. In 1875, the Confederation obligated cantons to pay pension costs for indigent patients from other cantons.

==== Infrastructure development ====
To improve care, rural hospitals or emergency facilities for non-transportable cases were created in almost all cantons from around 1830, with communes sharing costs. About sixty of these were taken over by the state before 1870 and transformed into circle or district hospitals.

Rising living standards subsequently induced a wave of foundations lasting until 1930, involving parishes, associations, and private individuals. This ultimately resulted in more than 190 general hospitals, creating a dense network of well-equipped establishments meeting modern medical requirements, often situated in small localities.

== Contemporary system ==
=== Structure and organization ===
As of 2023, Switzerland's hospital system comprises 275 establishments: 260 hospitals and 15 birthing centers. This represents a significant reduction from 406 establishments recorded in 1997, one year after the implementation of mandatory health insurance.

Hospitals are categorized according to a federal typology based primarily on activity domains (number of specialized divisions) and care days per division. This results in a distribution between "general care hospitals" and "specialized clinics." General care hospitals subdivide into "centralized care hospitals" and "basic care hospitals." In 2023, centralized care hospitals included five university hospital centers and 39 other large establishments, generally cantonal hospitals.

=== Patient statistics ===
Approximately 1.5 million patients received hospital treatment in Swiss hospitals in 2023. The hospital system recorded 11.8 million care days, with general care hospitals accounting for 82.5% of hospitalizations, psychiatric clinics for 4.5%, and rehabilitation clinics for 4.3%.

The average length of hospital stay varies significantly by type of care: 5.2 days for acute care and birthing centers, 33.4 days for psychiatric care, and 24.2 days for rehabilitation. Bed occupancy rates reached 79.5% for acute care, 91.7% for psychiatry, and 90.8% for rehabilitation.

=== Personnel and costs ===
Swiss hospitals employed 185,775 full-time equivalent positions in 2023. The workforce distribution includes 40% nursing staff in care domains, 15% physicians (of whom 7% are in postgraduate training), and 14% personnel in other specialized medical domains.

Personnel costs constitute on average 62% of operational expenses, representing the largest share of hospital expenditures. Investment costs account for an average of 8.7% of expenses.

Hospital sector costs represented 35.7% of total health system costs in 2022, amounting to 32.6 billion CHF out of total health costs of 91.5 billion CHF. Hospitalization and care revenues represent on average 83% of hospital income, with 83.1% of revenues coming from acute care, 10% from psychiatry, and 6.8% from rehabilitation.

=== Legal framework ===
The hospital system operates under the Federal Health Insurance Act (LAMal), which underwent significant reform with the introduction of uniform financing for health services. This reform, approved by Swiss voters on 24 November 2024, with 53.3% support, standardizes financing for both inpatient and outpatient hospital treatments, with cantons paying slightly more than a quarter of costs and insurers covering the remainder.

=== Payment systems ===
Swiss hospitals operate under the SwissDRG (Swiss Diagnosis Related Groups) system for acute care reimbursement, introduced nationally on 1 January 2012. This system is based on the German G-DRG patient classification system and provides uniform remuneration for hospital services according to case-based flat rates.

For psychiatric services, the TARPSY tariff structure was introduced on 1 January 2018, covering all inpatient psychiatric service domains for adults, children, and adolescents. The ST Reha tariff structure for rehabilitation entered into force on 1 January 2022.

=== Professional associations ===
The Swiss Hospital Association (Veska) was created in 1930 to represent public and private hospitals, clinics, sanatoriums, and various care establishments. Since 1996, it has been known as H+ The Hospitals of Switzerland (German: H+ Die Spitäler der Schweiz; French: H+ Les hôpitaux suisses; Italian: H+ Gli Ospedali Svizzeri). The association defends members' economic, legal, and medical interests, facilitates collaboration, participates in federal consultation processes, negotiates with professional associations, suppliers, and insurance companies, and maintains hospital statistics.

== List ==
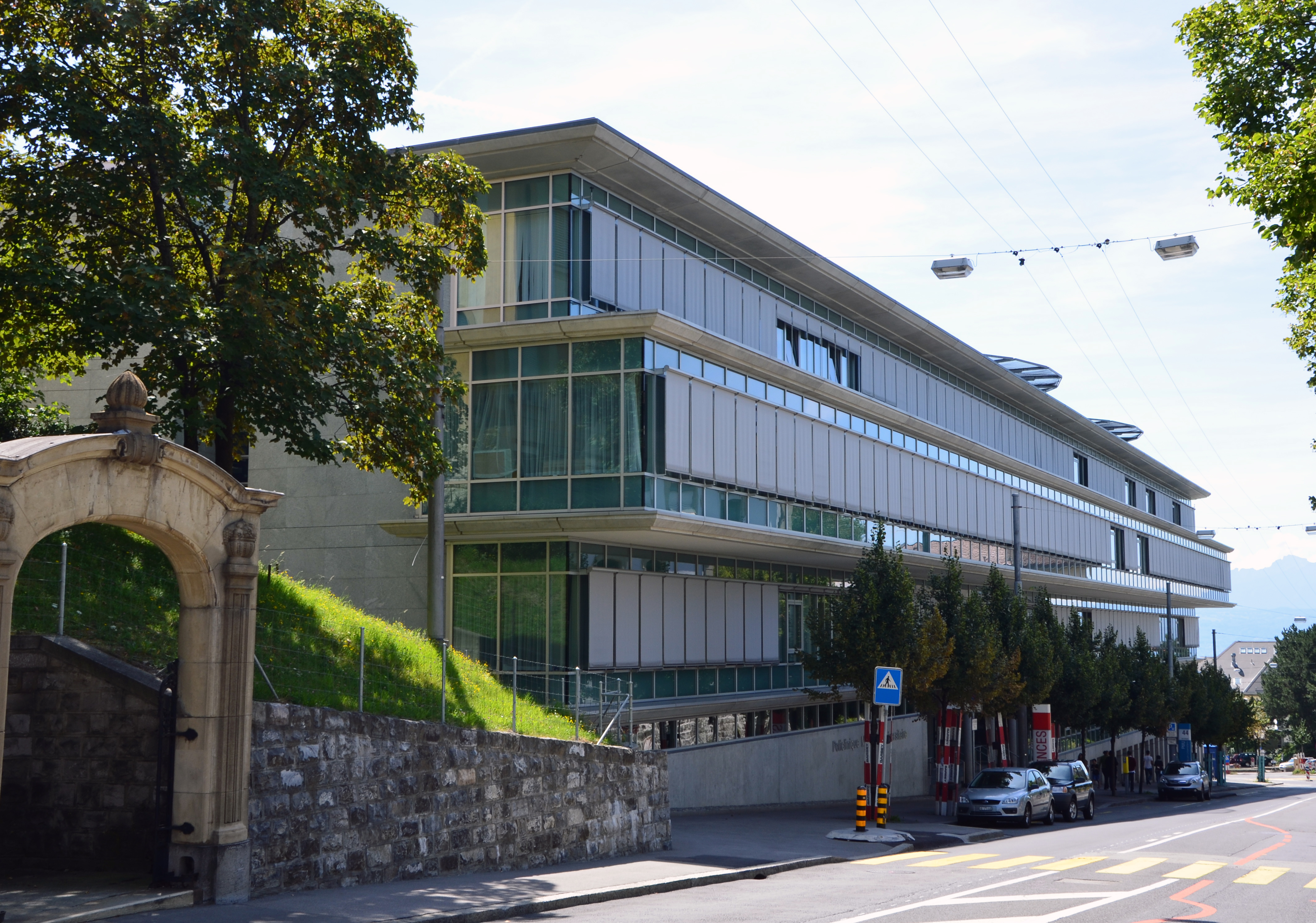
The Medical University Policlinic of the University Hospital of Lausanne with two helipads on its top

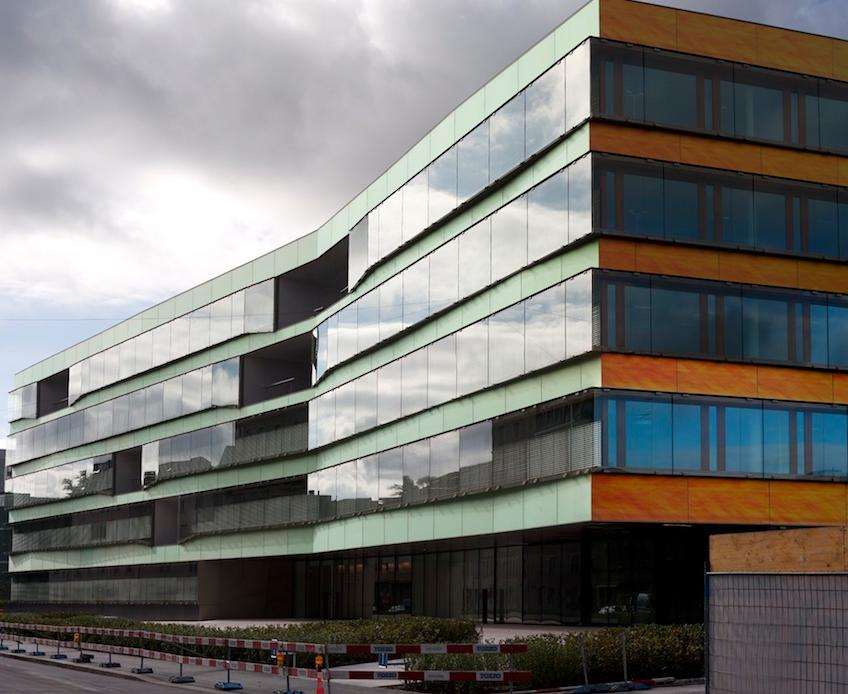
Children's hospital in Basel

- Clinica Hildebrand - Centro di riabilitazione Brissago, Brissago
- Geneva University Hospitals, Geneva
- University Hospital of Lausanne (CHUV), Lausanne
- Hirslanden Clinique Cecil, Lausanne
- Hirslanden Clinique Bois-Cerf, Lausanne
- Hirslanden Clinique La Colline, Geneva
- Istituto Cardiocentro Ticino (EOC), Lugano (it)
- La Ligniere Clinic, Gland
- L’Ente Ospedaliero Cantonale (EOC) - Ticino cantonal hospital system
- Ospedale Regionale di Bellinzona, Acquarossa (EOC), Bellinzona
- Ospedale Regionale di Bellinzona, Faido (EOC), Bellinzona
- Ospedale Regionale di Bellinzona, San Giovanni (EOC), Bellinzona
- Ospedale Regionale di Locarno, La Carità (EOC), Locarno
- Ospedale Regionale di Lugano, Italiano (EOC), Lugano (it)
- Ospedale Regionale di Mendrisio, Beata Vergine (EOC), Mendrisio
- Stadtspital Triemli, Zürich
- University Hospital of Basel
- University Hospital of Bern
- University Hospital of Zürich

== Bibliography ==
- J.F. Schmid, Das Schweizerische Gesundheitswesen im Jahre 1888, 1891
- A. Wild, Institutions et sociétés pour la prévoyance sociale en Suisse, 1910
- Denkschrift über Vorarbeiten, Gründung und Organisation [des] VESKA, 1931
- Hôpitaux et hospices publics de la Suisse 1930/1931, 1933
- P. Gygi, H. Henny, Le système suisse de santé, 1976 (21977)
- A.H. Murken, "Grundzüge des deutschen Krankenhauswesens von 1780 bis 1930 unter Berücksichtigung von Schweizer Vorbildern", in Gesnerus, 39, 1982, 7-45
- C. Hermann, Städtische Spitalbauten in der Schweiz, 1648-1798, 1986
- J. Schurtenberger, KSK/CCMS: 100 ans Concordat des caisses-maladie suisses, 1991
- Lugano e il suo ospedale, cat. expo. Lugano, 1995
- E. Gilomen-Schenkel, "Mittelalterliche Spitäler und Leprosorien im Gebiet der Schweiz", in Stadt- und Landmauern, 3, 1999, 117-124
- R. Huber, éd., Il Locarnese e il suo ospedale, 2000
- M. Louis-Courvoisier, Soigner et consoler: la vie quotidienne dans un hôpital à la fin de l'Ancien Régime (Genève 1750-1820), 2000
- P.-Y. Donzé, Bâtir, gérer, soigner: hist. des établissements hospitaliers de Suisse romande, 2003
- M.-N. Jomini et al., Les hôpitaux vaudois au Moyen Âge, 2005
- P.-Y. Donzé, L'ombre de César: les chirurgiens et la construction du système hospitalier vaudois (1840-1960), 2007
- P.-Y. Donzé, Histoire des politiques hospitalières en Suisse romande, 2017

== See also ==
- List of university hospitals
- Psychiatric hospitals in Switzerland
- Healthcare in Switzerland
- Basel Cantonal Hospital
