= Hirslanden Private Hospital Group =

Private hospital group in Switzerland

Hirslanden Group
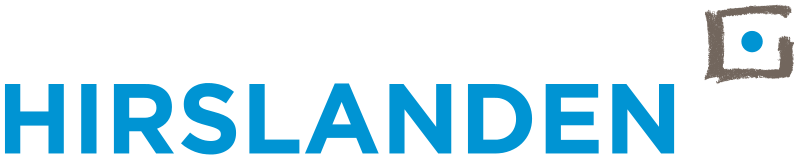
- Company type: Joint-stock company
- Industry: Healthcare, clinics and hospitals
- Founded: 1932 / 1990
- Headquarters: Zurich, Switzerland, Zurich, Switzerland
- Key people: Gilles Rufenacht (CEO)
- Number of employees: 13 796 (incl. doctors (as of 31 march 2024))
- Website: Hirslanden

The Hirslanden Group is the largest medical network in Switzerland. The group operates 16 hospitals in 10 cantons, many of which have an emergency department. It also operates 5 day case clinics, 19 radiology and 6 radiotherapy institutes. As of 31 march 2024, the group has 2 651 partner doctors and 10 565 employees (excl. doctors).

As of 31 march 2024, the group treated 112 008 patients for a total of 446 623 inpatient days. The patient mix consisted of 52.1% patients with basic insurance, 27.3% with semi-private insurance and 20.6% with private insurance.

== Location of the different hospitals ==
Hospital	City
Hirslanden Klinik Aarau	Aarau
Klinik Beau-Site	Bern
Klinik Permanence	Bern
Salem-Spital	Bern
Klinik Linde	Biel
Clinique des Grangettes	Chêne-Bougeries
Clinique La Colline	Geneva
Clinique Bois-Cerf	Lausanne
Clinique Cecil	Lausanne
Klinik St. Anna	Lucerne
St. Anna in Meggen	Meggen
Klinik Birshof	Münchenstein
Klinik Stephanshorn	St. Gallen
Andreas Klinik Cham Zug	Zug
Klinik Hirslanden	Zurich
Klinik Im Park	Zurich

Day case clinics	City
St. Anna im Bahnhof	Lucerne
OPERA St. Gallen	St. Gallen
OPERA Zumikon	Zumikon
Operationszentrum Bellaria	Zurich
OPERA Bern	Bern

== History ==
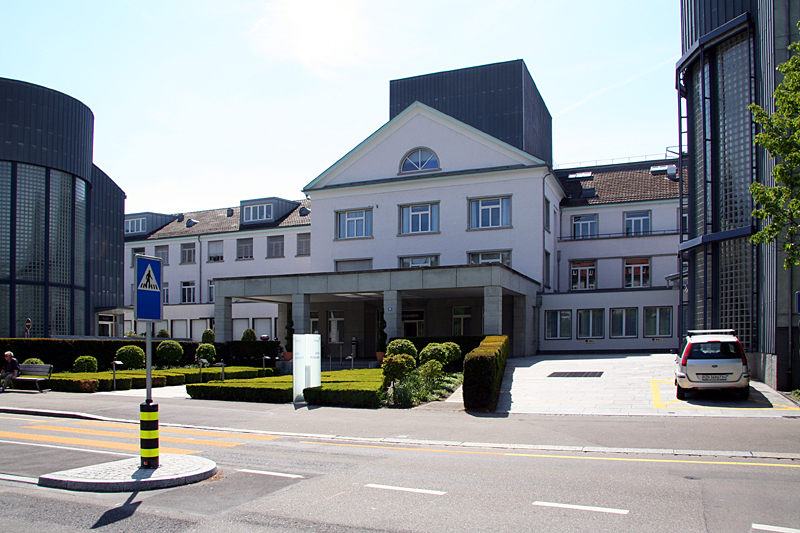
Klinik Hirslanden Zurich

The name Hirslanden comes from the Klinik Hirslanden in Zurich opened in 1932 and was at that time located in the Hirslanden district (today Weinegg). The Hirslanden Group was launched in early July 1990 by merging the Hirslanden Klinik with four hospitals then owned by the AMI Group (American Medical International): Klinik Im Schachen in Aarau (opened in 1988), Klinik Beau-Site in Bern (opened in 1945), Clinique Cecil in Lausanne (opened in 1931) and Klinik Im Park in Zurich (opened in 1986). The majority shareholder of the newly formed group was UBS.

In the following years, the group acquired many other hospitals: Klinik Permanence in Bern in 1997 (opened in 1978), Clinique Bois-Cerf in Lausanne in 1998, Klinik Belair in Schaffhausen and AndreasKlinik in Zug in 2001, Klinik Am Rosenberg in Heiden, Klinik Birshof in Basel and the Salem-Spital in Bern in 2002, Klinik St. Anna in Lucerne in 2005, Klinik Stephanshorn in St. Gallen in 2010, Klinik swissana clinic meggen in Meggen and Clinique La Colline in Geneva in 2014 and Privatklinik Linde in Biel/Bienne in 2017. In 2019, Hirslanden has sold the Klinik Belair in Schaffhausen.

Within the Group's shareholders, two major changes can be noted so far: in 2002, the British investment group BC Partners Funds took over UBS and sold the Hirslanden Hospital Group to the South African Mediclinic Corporation in 2007.

== Group structure ==
There have been three major changes to the Group’s ownership structure up until now. In 2002, the English investor group BC Partners acquired the Hirslanden Group from UBS. BC Partners then sold the company to the international hospital group Mediclinic International in 2007. Hirslanden thus became a wholly owned subsidiary of Mediclinic International, a public limited company listed on the London Stock Exchange (LSE). In 2023, Mediclinic International was acquired by Remgro Limited and SAS (part of MSC). In the course of the takeover, the company was delisted from the stock exchange and renamed the Mediclinic Group.

In 2020, the Hirslanden Group started a cooperation with Medbase.

In May of the same year, the subsidiary Hirslanden Venture Capital was founded at the headquarters in Opfikon, which, according to the commercial register, is intended to invest in particular in start-ups with innovative technologies and new business models.

== Official website ==
- Hirslanden Private Hospital Group
