= Mediclinic Group =

South African hospital company

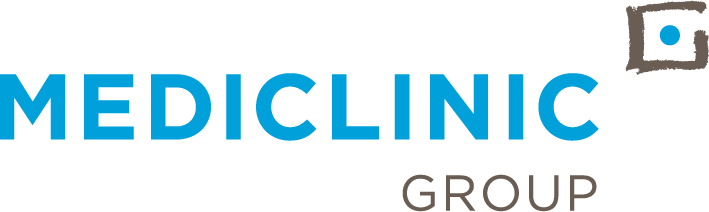
- Type: Private
- Traded as: JSE: MEI
- Industry: Hospital management
- Founded: October 3, 1983; 43 years ago
- Headquarters: Stellenbosch, South Africa
- Number of locations: 134 (2024)
- Key people: Dr Ronnie van der Merwe (CEO)
- Revenue: ▲£3,233 million (2022)
- Operating income: ▲£280 million (2022)
- Net income: ▲£170 million (2022)
- Number of employees: 37,000+ (2024)
- Website: www.mediclinic.com

Mediclinic Group, often simply referred to as Mediclinic, is an international private hospital group with operations in South Africa, Namibia, Switzerland, and the United Arab Emirates.

Founded in 1983, the company is headquartered in Stellenbosch, in the Western Cape province of South Africa. It has been listed on the JSE, the South African securities exchange, since 1986. It was listed on the London Stock Exchange until May 2023, when it was acquired by a South African consortium that included Remgro and Mediterranean Shipping Company.

== History ==
Mediclinic was founded in 1983 in Stellenbosch, South Africa when Dr Edwin Hertzog, was commissioned by the then Rembrandt Group (now Remgro Group) to undertake a feasibility study on how profitable private hospitals could be. Three years later Mediclinic, running four hospitals in commission and three hospitals under construction, listed on the JSE, the South African stock exchange in 1986.

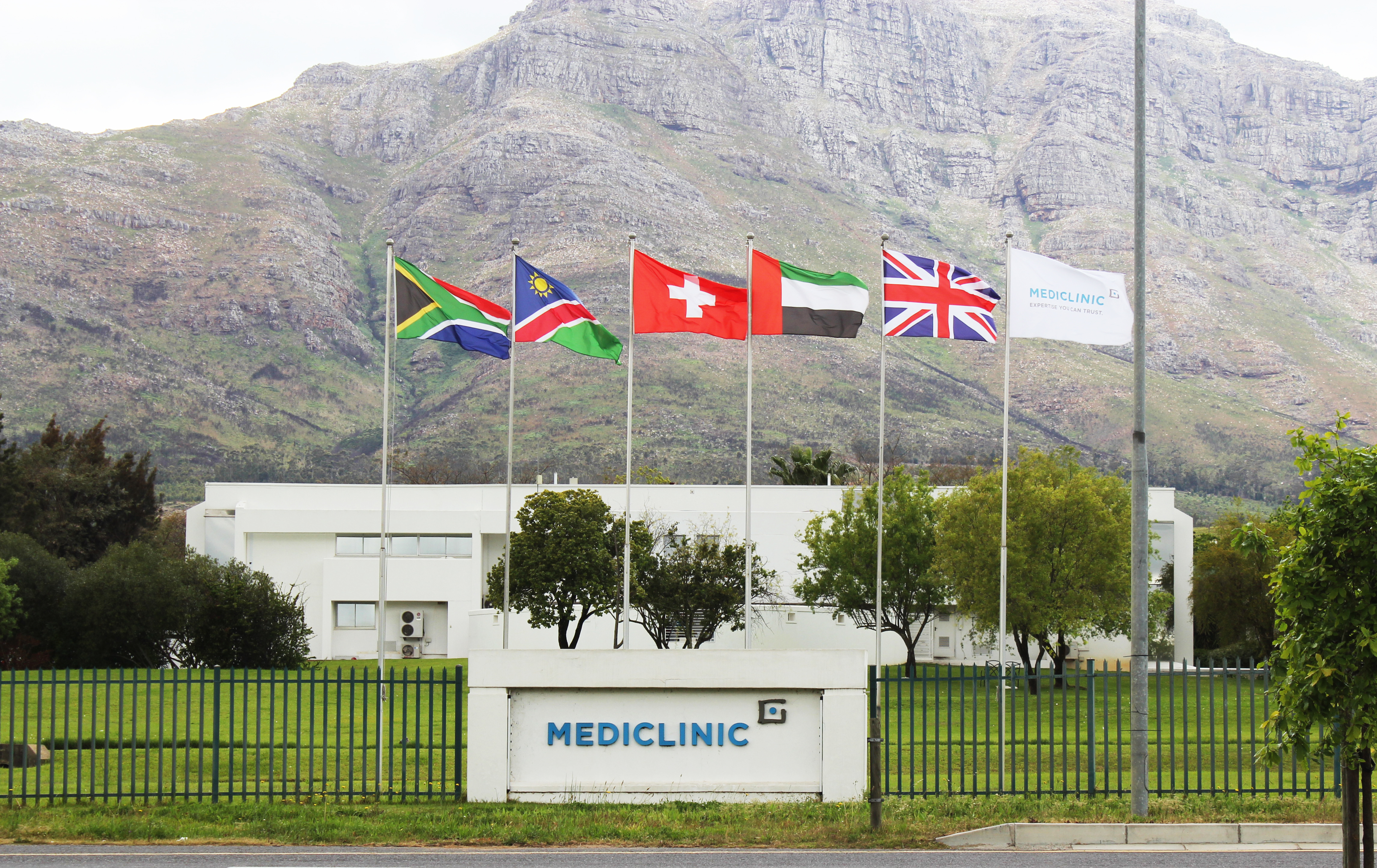
Mediclinic head office in Stellenbosch, South Africa.

In 2006, Mediclinic reached agreement to acquire a controlling interest in Emirates Healthcare in Dubai, United Arab Emirates, which then owned one hospital, the rights to develop two further hospitals in the Dubai Healthcare City and five clinics.

Mediclinic acquired Hirslanden, the largest private hospital group in Switzerland, for SF2.54bn in 2007.

In June 2015, Mediclinic then acquired a 29.9% interest in Spire Healthcare, a UK-based private healthcare group.

Mediclinic announced a reverse merger of Al Noor Hospitals in October 2015. The former Mediclinic shareholders owned up to 93% of the combined business on completion. The merger was completed on 15 February 2016.

The healthcare group officially started trading on the London Stock Exchange on 16 February 2016.

The founder stepped down in 2020 and Dame Inga Beale took over as chair of the company.

The South African arm of Mediclinic was criticised in 2021 when it emerged that controversial doctor and former South African chemical and biological weapons program head Wouter Basson was working at one of its Western Cape facilities.

In August 2022, the company accepted a takeover offer worth £3.7 billion from a South African consortium which included Remgro and Mediterranean Shipping Company. In May 2023, the company confirmed that the South African Reserve Bank had approved the transaction, so allowing it to complete.

In April 2026, Remgro signed an agreement to acquire full ownership of Mediclinic Southern Africa, in a deal worth R16.2 billion that would see Mediclinic Holdings selling its Swiss Hirslanden Private Hospital Group to IHL. The deal, which has a long stop date of 30 September 2027, will therefore divide Mediclinic Group's operations along geographical lines. Remgro and IHL will fully control their respective regional segments of the group's operations, while keeping joint interests in the Middle East and UK. At the time of the announcement, the deal awaited regulatory approval in both South Africa and Switzerland.

== Operations ==
Mediclinic also holds a 29.9% interest in Spire Healthcare, a LSE listed and UK-based private healthcare group.
