= Théodore Aubert =

Swiss lawyer and writer

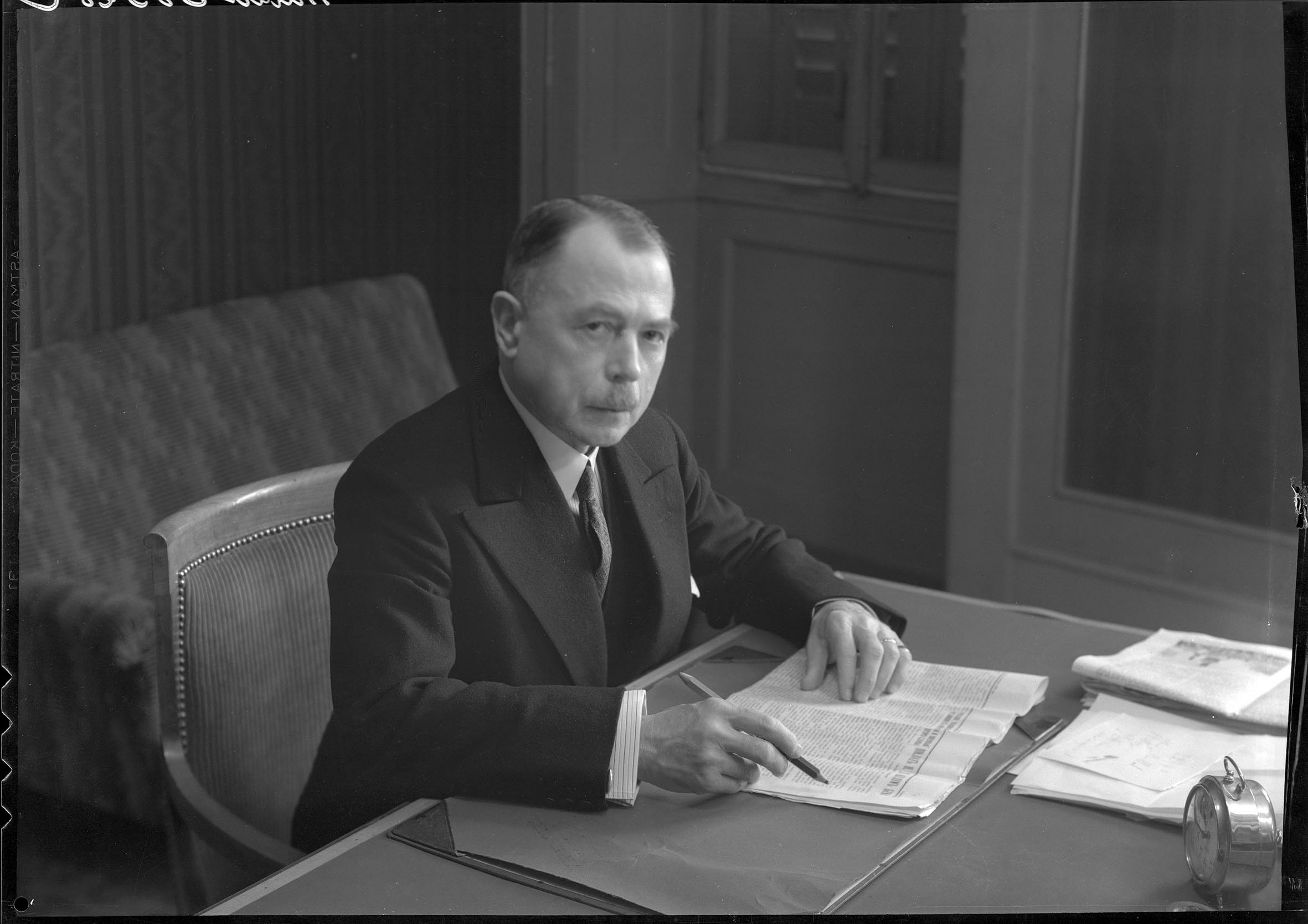
Théodore Aubert, mars 1939.

Théodore Aubert (8 September 1878, Geneva – 19 January 1963) was a Swiss lawyer and writer.

== Biography ==
Aubert was born to an eminent family of bankers. He studied law at the University of Geneva. He was regional secretary of the Swiss Patriotic Federation, an umbrella organization for civil defense, which was formed in 1918 against the national strike and advocated for the creation of right-wing militant groups. Aubert was party leader of the newly founded Union de défense économique. As a lawyer, he defended the White émigré Maurice Conradi who assassinated the Soviet envoy to Switzerland Vatslav Vorovsky in 1923.

Aubert founded the International Entente Against the Third International in 1924, which was financially supported by Nazi Germany and Fascist Italy. From 1935 to 1939 he was a member of the National Council for the fascist Union nationale.
