= Maurice Conradi =

Swiss military officer

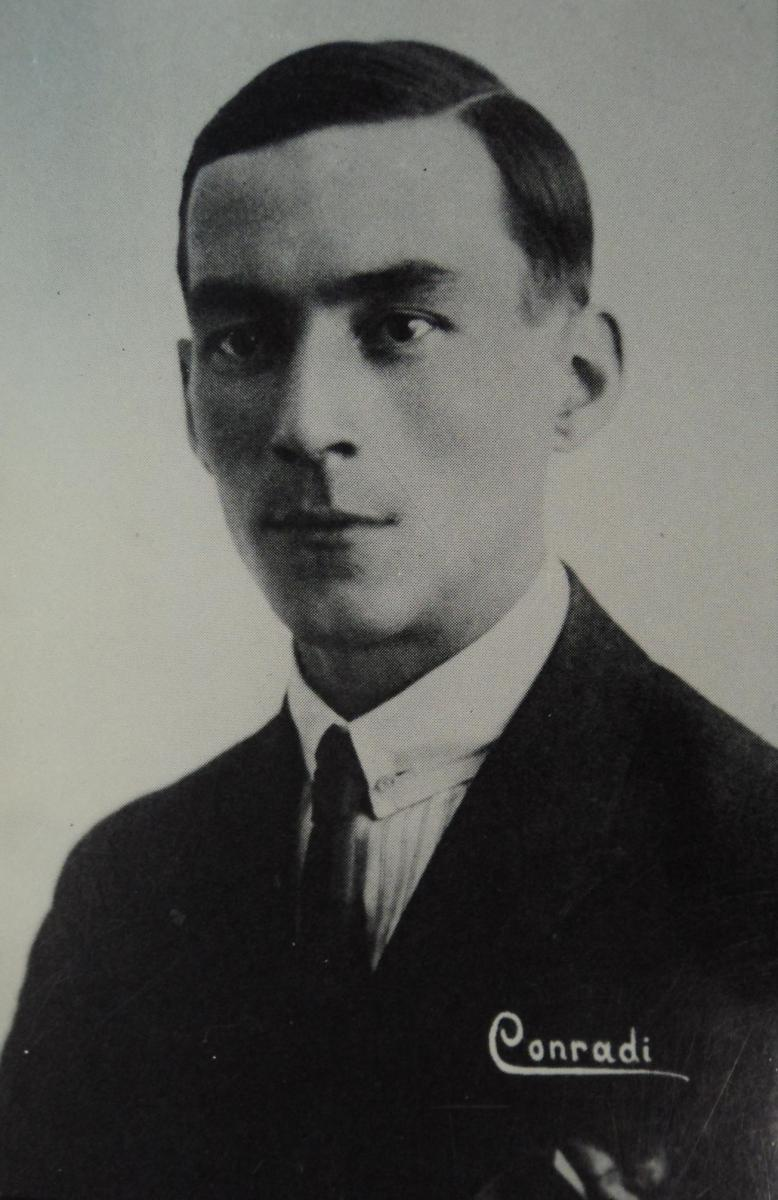
- Born: June 16, 1896; Saint Petersburg, Russian Empire
- Died: February 7, 1947 (aged 50); Chur, Switzerland
- Citizenship: Russian Empire (to 1920); Switzerland (1920-1947)

Maurice Alexander Conradi (Russian: Морис Морисович Конради, Moris Morisovich Konradi; 16 June 1896 − 7 February 1947) was a White Army emigre participant of the First World War and the Russian Civil War and the assassin of the Soviet diplomat Vatslav Vorovsky.

== Early life ==
Conradi was born in Saint Petersburg to a Swiss family from Andeer, owners of a confectionery factory established in 1853 by Conradi's grandfather. Upon the outbreak of World War I he joined the Russian Imperial Army. During the Bolshevik Revolution most of his family was killed and their assets seized: his father, Maurice, was executed in Saint Petersburg on 26 November 1919, his brother, Victor-Edward, taken hostage and executed in 1918, and two further siblings disappeared during the Red Terror. During the civil war, he met his wife-to-be, Vladislava Lvovna Svartsevich (Владислава Львовна Сварцевич). After the defeat of the Wrangel Army, Conradi fled to Switzerland, and among other Russian expats there was radicalized further against the Bolsheviks.

== Murder of Vorovsky ==
In April 1923 Conradi attempted an assassination of Soviet People's Commissar of Foreign Affairs Georgy Chicherin while he visited Germany, but unable to find him he returned to Geneva. Finding out about the upcoming conference, he planned another assassination. Vatslav Vorovsky, Ivan Ariens and Maxim Divilkovsky were envoys of the Bolshevik government to the Conference of Lausanne. They were accepted as observers to the conference but not as participants, and they received no diplomatic protection in the country. On 10 May 1923 Conradi and his companion Arkady Polunin (Аркадий Павлович Полунин) (Polonnine in French and court transcriptions) entered the restaurant of the Hotel Cécil, shooting the Bolshevik delegation. Vorovsky was killed at the scene, and Ariens and Divilkovsky were wounded but survived.

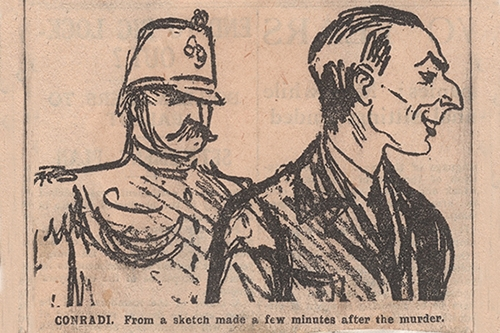
Maurice Conradi with policeman: "From a sketch made a few minutes after the murder" of Vatslav Vorovsky, printed in the Daily Herald upon Conradi's acquittal on 1923-11-17.

Conradi did not resist arrest or conceal his actions or motivations. In his statement to police he said, "Among those who played their part in the ruin of Russia, and indirectly of all mankind, there are no innocents." The Swiss Federal Council was "outrage[d]" by the assassination, but decided to treat it as a local crime rather than an international incident. Swiss-Soviet relations had been tense for years; Soviet foreign secretary Georgy Chicherin told the Federal Council that in denying Vorovsky official recognition and protection, they had "heavy and absolutely obvious responsibility" for the murder. The Council responded by demanding reparation for crimes against Swiss citizens living in Russia during the revolution.

The "Conradi Affair" was an international sensation. Soviet and left-wing literature presented the murder as a conspiracy of "fascist White radicals", while Conradi was supported by many White émigrés and Russian activists in exile, including Ivan Bunin, Ivan Shmelyov and Dmitry Merezhkovsky.

The trial of Conradi and Polunin began on 5 November 1923 in the Cantonal Court of Vaud. Defended by Théodore Aubert, Conradi and Polunin plead not guilty, and with the defendants agreeing to most key facts except conspiracy, the argument became a moral one. Soon the local criminal trial became a trial of the Russian Revolution and the Bolshevik regime. Defense witnesses described the atrocities of the revolution and Red Terror, against Conradi's family and Swiss expats in particular; defense counsel arguments included that Bolsheviks had performed many assassinations and that Conradi was a "liberator of the world's conscience." The prosecution responded to this with witnesses including an Italian communist and a Bolshevik military official testifying about how happy life in Soviet Russia became after the Revolution.

The jury agreed to all questions of fact but voted 5-to-4 against conviction. The court ordered Conradi to pay the legal fees of the trial at the request of the prosecutor. The verdict was controversial internationally, and Russia in response cut relations and boycotted all Swiss goods. The USSR would soon make repeated attempts to restore relations, although Vorovsky remained a contentious issue. A provisional solution was reached in 1927, but Swiss-Soviet relations were not restored until 1946.

== Further life ==
Following the trial, Conradi remained in Lausanne with his wife until May 1925, when they moved to Paris. The couple divorced on 24 September 1929.

Conradi served in the French Foreign Legion and information about his death circulated in newspapers in 1931. However, he returned to his family's home canton of Graubünden, got remarried in 1942 to Regula Wickerlin, and died on 7 February 1947 in Chur. He never had children.

Polunin went to Paris after the trial and died under mysterious circumstances in Dreux on 23 February 1933.

Ariens and Divilkovsky, the survivors of the assassination plot, returned to the Soviet Union and held various positions in the administration. Ariens's final post was as Consul General of the USSR, and he was executed on 11 January 1938 during Great Purge. Divilkovsky studied physics under L. I. Mandelstam and became secretary of the physics group at the Academy of Sciences. He volunteered for service in World War II and was killed in 1942.

== See also ==
- The Trial of the Century — Victor Kravchenko versus French Communist weekly Les Lettres Françaises (1949)
- Boris Kowerda

== Sources ==
- Fleury, Antoine; Imboden, Gabriel, eds. (1988). Diplomatic Documents of Switzerland. Vol. 8. Bern. ISBN 3-7165-0609-5. dodis.ch/44917.
