= International Anticommunist Entente =

- Entente Internationale Anticommuniste
- Abbreviation: EIA
- Formation: 1924
- Founder: Théodore Aubert
- Dissolved: 1950
- Headquarters: Geneve, Switzerland
- Formerly called: International Entente Against the Third International (1924–1938)

The International Anticommunist Entente (French: Entente Internationale Anticommuniste EIA) was an international anti-communist organisation based in Geneva, Switzerland. Prior to 1938, it was known as the International Entente Against the Third International (French: Entente internationale contre la III:e internationale).

The organisation was founded by the Swiss advocate Théodore Aubert and Russian émigré Red Cross leader Georges Lodygensky as a response to the Communist International in 1924. Its objectives were to defend the "principles of order, family, property and nationality".

The entente had national chapters in over 20 countries, with the aim of influencing political and journalistic circles. The British chapter was the Central Council of the Economic Leagues. In Finland, the national chapter Suomen Suojelusliitto was founded by the prominent statesman Carl Gustaf Emil Mannerheim a year earlier in 1923 to do anti-communist education. According to some accounts, Francisco Franco's anti-communism was initially sparked by reading the entente's publications and he also met Aubert. Other notable sympathizers included Philippe Pétain and Franz von Papen.

Despite its international character, the bulk of the funding came from Swiss businesses; usually provided by banks, insurance companies and industrialists. From around 1935, the EIA began to be financed by Nazi Germany and even more so by Fascist Italy.

EIA published Revue Anticommuniste. EIA opened an information centre in August 1937.

After World War II, EIA's membership numbers greatly decreased and its leaders considered the United States to be a better center for leading anti-communist activities than Europe. The organisation ceased operation in 1950.
