= Basel Cantonal Hospital =

Public hospital network in the canton of Basel-Landschaft, Switzerland

- Location within Switzerland

Geography
- Location: Liestal, Laufen, and Bottmingen, Basel-Landschaft, Switzerland
- Coordinates: 47.488°N 7.731°E

Organisation
- Type: Teaching
- Affiliated university: University of Basel

Services
- Emergency department: Yes
- Beds: 567 (2017)

History
- Opened: March 2012

Links
- Website: www.ksbl.ch
- Lists: Hospitals in Switzerland

The Basel Cantonal Hospital (BCH) is a public-law institution of the Canton of Basel-Landschaft in Switzerland. It was created in March 2012 through the merger of the Liestal Cantonal Hospital, the Laufen Cantonal Hospital, and the Bruderholz Hospital in Binningen.

As of 2017, the three hospitals together had three delivery rooms, 14 operating theatres, and 567 beds.

== Clinics and institutes ==
The three hospitals offer the following clinics and institutes:

- Eye Clinic
- Basel-Landschaft Centre for Rehabilitation and Geriatric Medicine
- Basel-Land Women's Clinic
- Clinic for Surgery
- Clinic for Ear, Nose and Throat Diseases, Oral and Maxillofacial Surgery
- Clinic for Orthopedics and Traumatology of the Musculoskeletal System
- Clinic for Pain Therapy
- Medical University Clinic
- Urological University Clinic
- Institute for Anaesthesiology and Intensive Care Medicine
- Institute for Pathology
- Institute for Radiology and Nuclear Medicine
- Emergency Centre
- University Centre for General Medicine of Both Basels

== History ==
In 2012, the hospital operations were spun off from the cantonal administration and the "Basel Cantonal Hospital - BCH" was created as an independent public-law institution with a board of directors through the merger of the previously integrated hospitals in Liestal, Bruderholz, and Laufen.

Since the closure of the nearby District Hospital Breitenbach Hospital (only 3.7 km away), the Laufen Cantonal Hospital experienced an upswing. However, the future was also uncertain because the University Hospital of Basel (UHB, 661 beds) and the Bruderholz Cantonal Hospital (398 beds) also competed for patients. Therefore, in 2018, a state treaty was signed to form a joint hospital group between the UHB and the BCH.

The hospital group proposed merging the UHB and BCH to create a cross-cantonal University Hospital of Northwestern Switzerland. Although the parliaments of the cantons of Basel-Landschaft and Basel spoke in favour, the electorate rejected the project at the ballot box on 10 February 2019. In Basel, 56% voted No (with a voter turnout of 49%), and in Basel-Landschaft, 67% voted Yes (with a voter turnout of 38%). Since approval from the electorate of both cantons was required, the merger failed.

=== Liestal Cantonal Hospital ===
An Upper Hospital is said to have existed within the city walls of Liestal as early as the 13th century – as a hostel for travellers, pilgrims, and beggars, and from the 15th century particularly as a benefice institution for the local population. In the 14th century, the "Lower Hospital" was built below the city walls as a leper hospital. The "Upper Hospital" was rebuilt in 1602 and the "Lower Hospital" in 1769. Although the "Upper Hospital" was relocated again in 1816, the two – the "Upper" and "Lower" – were merged in 1834 as the "Cantonal Poor Hospital" at the location of the "Lower Hospital".

In 1840, the hospital physician Jakob Jenny and the Liestal district physician Johann Jakob Gutzwiller reported to the Basel-Landschaft Health Commission on the grotesque condition of the hospital and demanded a new building. Two years later, the commission submitted an urgent motion to the cantonal government for an expansion of the hospital. It was not until 1851 that the Cantonal Parliament approved a new building for the hospital (a so-called "Clergyman's house" or charity hospital), which opened in 1854 and was designed for 360 people.

Due to the rapidly growing population, the space in the new building also became too scarce. Nevertheless, in 1871, the administrative commission of the church, school, and poor estate rejected the proposals of the Health Council for financial reasons. The honorary poor inspector Birmann then took the initiative: the privately commissioned plans were able to convince at a meeting of the cantonal government, the Health Council, and the administrative commission in September 1871. On 22 July 1877, the first Basel-Landschaft hospital in the modern sense was inaugurated with 78 patient and staff beds.

Although renovations were constantly carried out – including the opening of an isolation ward for infectious diseases in 1894 and the addition of two operating theatres in 1906 – and the capacity was gradually increased to 139 beds, space became increasingly scarce. The situation worsened considerably when the Canton of Basel raised hospital fees for out-of-town patients (who were particularly from Basel-Landschaft) in 1947, meaning that fewer Basel-Landschaft residents, especially from the Arlesheim district, went to Basel and instead went to Liestal.

In 1951, the "Expert Commission for the Assessment of the Hospital Building Issue" therefore recommended a construction programme with two hospitals in Liestal and on the Bruderholz, each with 230 beds. The Cantonal Parliament approved this project and requested the cantonal government to negotiate with its counterpart in Basel. Consequently, the "Joint Expert Commission for Hospital Issues" was founded by the two cantonal governments in 1952. Despite the planned construction programme, a Durisol barrack was put into operation in 1954 as a temporary solution with 53 beds – instead of, as considered, the Erzenberg Sanatorium in Langenbruck. In 1957, the "Law Concerning the Hospital System" was passed, and a credit of 28.5 million Swiss francs was approved for a new building with 315 beds, a nurses' home for 130 nurses, a staff building with 72 beds for administrative staff, a central laundry, and a district heating plant. After construction began in 1958, the building was opened in 1962.

The 40-year-old building had to be renovated from 1998 to 2002; in addition, a new Ward Building 2 and a surgical outpatient clinic were inaugurated in 1998.

=== Laufen Cantonal Hospital ===
In Laufen, a small hospital house is said to have been built as early as 1706 and another one in 1754; however, the buildings were – as in Liestal – more of a place for the chronically ill, lepers, the insane, and beneficiaries.

Joseph Conrad Gabriel Feninger (1785–1869), born in Laufen, studied medicine in Strasbourg and Paris and later became a medical officer in Napoleon's army. After his political career – he was a Bernese Grand Councillor and government lieutenant – he bequeathed a large part of his fortune and his residence to the district of Laufen, stipulating that it should serve to operate a hospital. He decreed that both men and women should be treated in this house and that the needy should have priority in medical care.

On 2 May 1872, the Feninger Hospital, located in the old town, began operations with five beds. Initially, nursing care was provided jointly by Protestant deaconesses from Bern and Catholic hospital sisters from Menzingen. They were replaced in 1894 by sisters from Ingenbohl, who served at the new location until 1977. In 1907, initial plans for a new building were developed due to lack of space, but the district, which was responsible for the administration of the hospital, could only bring itself to carry out renovations. During the First World War, the Feninger Hospital received its first operating theatre. The board of directors decided on 30 June 1931 to build a new building at a "dust-free, quiet, sunny location" outside Laufen's old town. The municipal citizen community provided the land, and the Gerster-Roth Foundation, which belongs to the Laufen Ceramic Industry, laid the financial foundation for a new building in 1942: Thirteen years later – on 18 October 1953 – the new Feninger Hospital was opened on the Maiersacker, with space for 130 patients and 20 newborns.

Extensions were carried out in the 1980s and 1990s. North of the hospital, an underground hospital with a total of 248 beds and several operating theatres was built. On the south side, a centre for geriatrics was built. The nurses' home near the primary school was demolished. The underground hospital now serves as a club and practice room for the Samaritan Association. Since the founding of the Canton of Jura in 1978, the Laufen Valley belonging to Bern was separated from the rest of the cantonal territory. After the change of canton to Basel-Landschaft on 1 January 1994, the hospital was downsized several times but upgraded in status. It became a cantonal hospital and was thus in principle on an equal footing with the then Liestal Cantonal Hospital and the Bruderholz Hospital. Due to case numbers being too low, the gynaecology and obstetrics department in Laufen was closed in 2014.

The range of services at the Laufen hospital has since been further reduced. From 2020, only an outpatient treatment centre remained at this location, and in March 2024, the health centre was moved to the Birs Shopping Centre near the railway station, thus ceasing operations entirely in the former hospital building in Laufen. The building was to be demolished in 2025 to allow for housing construction on the site. After negotiations between the city of Laufen and the Canton of Basel-Landschaft, the land was to be gifted to the city of Laufen. A committee, which was dedicated, among other things, to preserving the hospital, gathered enough signatures against the contract, forced a vote, and won it in December 2023. The canton has not yet had any plans for further use of the building.

=== Bruderholz Hospital ===
Due to the increasing population in the Canton of Basel-Landschaft and waiting lists at the hospitals in Laufen and Liestal, the Joint Expert Commission for Hospital Issues BS/BL submitted a motion in 1962 to commence planning for a district hospital in the lower part of the canton (Birseck). In 1965, the Cantonal Parliament adopted a preliminary project for a hospital in the Bruderholz region with around 520 beds on the proposal of the cantonal government. In 1968, the expert commission recommended that the first construction phase should begin as soon as possible; 1 year later – on 9 January 1969 – the Cantonal Parliament passed a construction credit for 112.5 million Swiss francs with 64 votes to 0. On 15 October 1973, the so-called "Bruderholz" hospital, which ultimately cost around 160 million Swiss francs, was opened and was fully operational by 1975.

In 1996, the University of Basel appointed the then chief physician at the Bruderholz Hospital, Hans Kummer, as a full professor of internal medicine, which led to the Bruderholz Hospital becoming the first university clinic outside the Canton of Basel. In 2016, the women's clinic was closed; the Bethesda Hospital in Basel took over a large part of the staff, and the University Hospital Basel also increased its capacities. With 67.2% of the votes, the Bruderholz Initiative, which would have enshrined the preservation of "extended basic care" at the Bruderholz site in the hospital law of the Canton of Basel-Landschaft, was rejected in 2017.

== See also ==
- University Hospital of Basel
- Hospitals in Switzerland
- Cantons of Switzerland

== Bibliography ==
- Stalder, Felix (1972). "Der Neubau des Bruderholzspitals". Basler Stadtbuch 1972 (in German). Basel. pp. 239–246.
