= Al Noor Hospitals =

Al Noor Hospitals Group plc

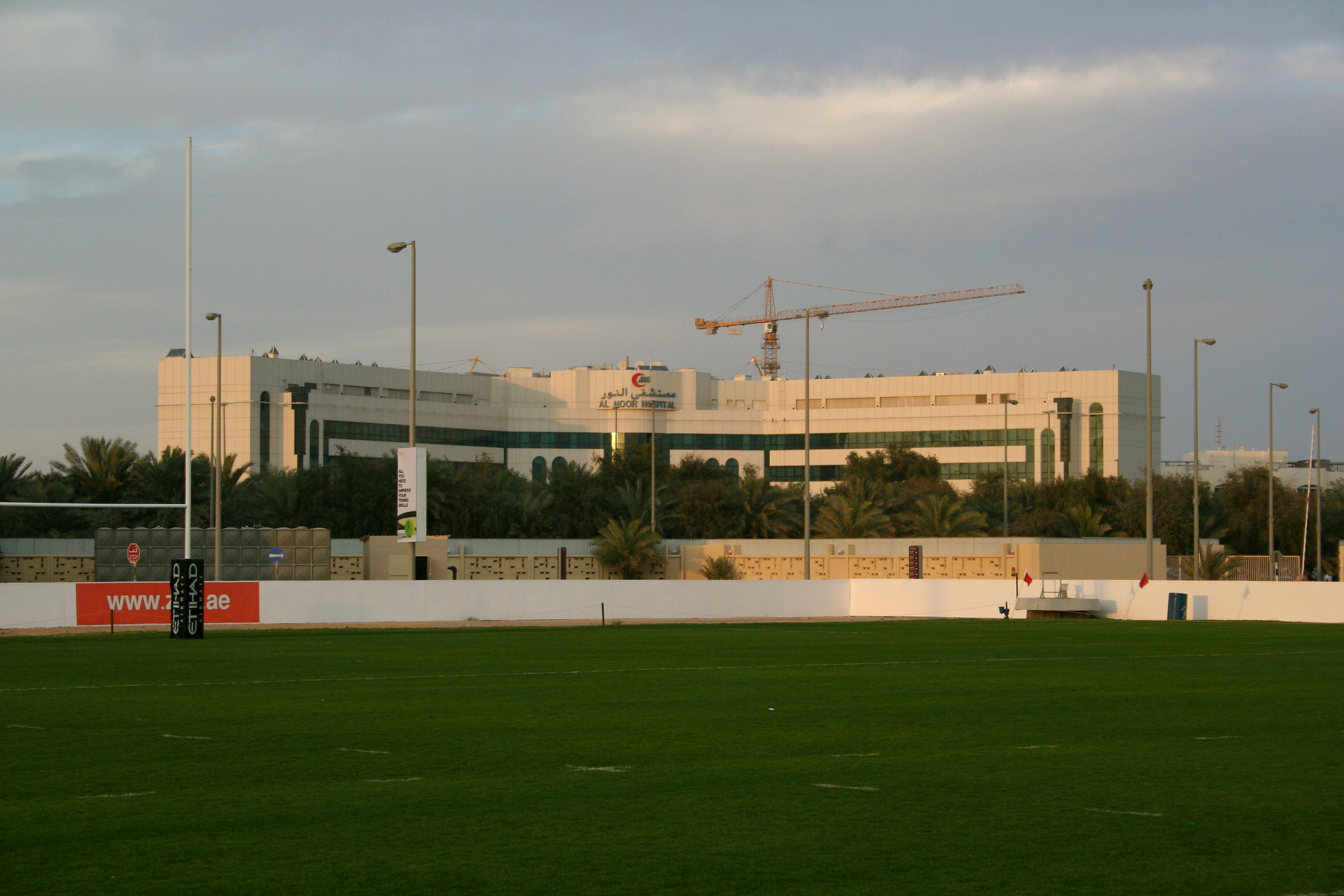
- Type: Public limited company
- Traded as: LSE: ANH
- Industry: Hospital management
- Founded: 1985
- Defunct: 2016
- Headquarters: Abu Dhabi City, United Arab Emirates
- Key people: Ian Tyler (Chairman); Ronald Lavater (CEO)
- Revenue: $449.1 million (2014)
- Operating income: $85.4 million (2014)
- Net income: $82.0 million (2014)
- Number of employees: 4,500 (2016)
- Website: www.alnoorhospital.com

Maatouk, Michele (20 October 2015). "Al Noor Hospitals confirms interest from VPS Healthcare". Sharecast.com. ShareCast.

Al Noor Hospitals Group plc was a business operating medical-surgical facilities located in Abu Dhabi City, United Arab Emirates. The company transformed healthcare in Abu Dhabi under the leadership of Dr Kassem Alom and Sheikh Mohammed Bin Butti and for many years the company was the largest healthcare operator in Abu Dhabi: it had a market share of 39% at the time of its initial public offering. It also provided support for several major humanitarian operations in the region including relief for the victims of Bam earthquake in southern Iran in 2003 and setting up the Emirates International Humanitarian Mobile Hospital in the remote town of Juba in southern Sudan in 2009.

It was listed on the London Stock Exchange until it merged with Mediclinic International in a transaction which valued Al Noor Hospitals at £1.4 billion (US$2.1 billion) in February 2016.

== History ==
The company was first established as an eight-bed operation on Hamdam Street in Abu Dhabi by Dr Kassem Alom and Sheikh Mohammed Bin Butti in 1985. Dr Kassem Alom originally came from Syria and trained in Spain before practicing at Charing Cross Hospital in London: when he arrived in Abu Dhabi there was no healthcare provision other than a group of caravans known as "Central Hospital". (Note: Central Hospital continued to provide a basic healthcare service to people of all nationalities and ethnic communities and ultimately closed in 2008.) Through organic growth, Alom expanded the business such that the company secured a major share of the healthcare market in Abu Dhabi. Zayed bin Sultan Al Nahyan, the ruler of Abu Dhabi and President of the United Arab Emirates subsequently went to Al Noor Hospitals for treatment. Alom was subsequently appointed to the supreme council of the Ministry of Health.

Al Noor Hospitals benefited from the financial support of Sheikh Mohammed bin Butti Al Hamed, who was at the time of the founding of the business, chairman of the municipality of Abu Dhabi and the Ruler's representative in the Western Region. It also received financial backing from Ithmar Capital. The company became the first healthcare business to open a fertility unit in the country in 1993. The company's second facility was at Khalifa Street, a small polyclinic facility established in 2001, that grew until it had 1,200 patients.

In 2003 the company led an initiative to provide emergency medical treatment to the victims of Bam earthquake in southern Iran; working with the Emirates Red Crescent, it sent a team of doctors and paramedics together medicines worth Dh 0.5 million (US$135000; £106,000). The company expanded further with the opening of a 50-bed hospital in Al Ain in 2006. The company was also involved in lobbying for and, ultimately, benefited from the introduction of compulsory medical insurance, which led to higher per capita health spending, in Abu Dhabi in 2007.

The company supported the Emirates Red Crescent and the Department of Health again, this time in setting up the Emirates International Humanitarian Mobile Hospital in the remote town of Juba in southern Sudan in 2009. The mobile hospital, which was the region's first civilian field hospital, was 26 metres (85 ft) long and offered air-conditioned intensive care unit, operating theatre and pharmacy facilities. The business considered seeking a listing on a recognised stock exchange in 2011 but abandoned plans because of weak market conditions due to the 2008 financial crisis.

Al Noor Hospitals was the subject of an initial public offering, which raised £221 million in June 2013. The flotation valued the company at £672 million (US$1.04 billion) and provided funds for future expansion in the gulf states were money is available but where diabetes is prevalent. The company made three acquisitions in the United Arab Emirates in 2014 including the Gulf International Cancer Centre, the only private cancer treatment centre in Abu Dhabi. The acquisition of the Gulf International Cancer Centre, was an important strategic step by the company in the context that while, cancer is widespread around the world, like diabetes, it also very prevalent in the region. In September 2014 Dr Kassem Alom stood down as Chief Executive and handed over to Ron Lavater, who had previously managed Corniche Hospital in Abu Dhabi and joined from Johns Hopkins Medicine International.

Continued growth led to Al Noor Hospitals entering the FTSE 250 Index of leading companies in October 2014. The company which had first performed open heart surgery in 2003, established a 24-hour cardiology department at the Al Noor Hospital on Airport Road in Abu Dhabi in November 2014. In August 2015, the company entered into leases to expand its existing facilities at Airport Road in Abu Dhabi, at Khalifa Street in Abu Dhabi and at Al Ain Hospital in Al Ain.

On 14 October 2015 Mediclinic International announced a merger with Al Noor Hospitals. Shortly thereafter NMC Health also announced a potential bid for Al Noor Hospitals, as did VPS Healthcare on 20 October 2015. A major bidding battle for dominance of the healthcare market in the Gulf Region ensued and, although NMC Health withdrew from the bidding on 16 November 2015, it was not until 30 November 2015 that VPS Healthcare withdrew. The final deal valued Al Noor Hospitals at £1.4 billion (US$2.1 billion). One analyst even suggested that the bidding battle would result in the healthcare sector becoming the next mining sector in terms of its attractiveness to international financial markets.

The merger between Al Noor Hospitals and Mediclinic International was completed on 15 February 2016. The size of the merger resulted in Mediclinic joining the FTSE 100 Index of leading companies in March 2016.

== Operations ==
The company operated 227 operational beds at primary, secondary, and tertiary care through three hospitals (Airport Road in Abu Dhabi, Khalifa Street in Abu Dhabi and Al Ain Hospital in Al Ain) and nine medical centres. At the time of its flotation its market share in Abu Dhabi was 39%, more than double its nearest competitor. It employed 4,500 people, including 550 doctors.
