= Clinique La Colline =

Hospital in Geneva, Switzerland

Coordinates: 46.19141°N 6.14992°E

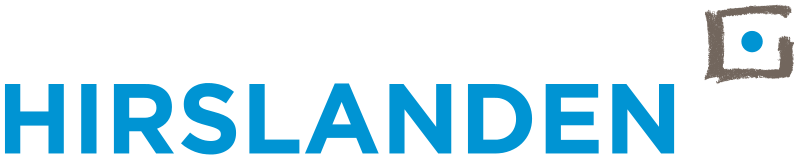

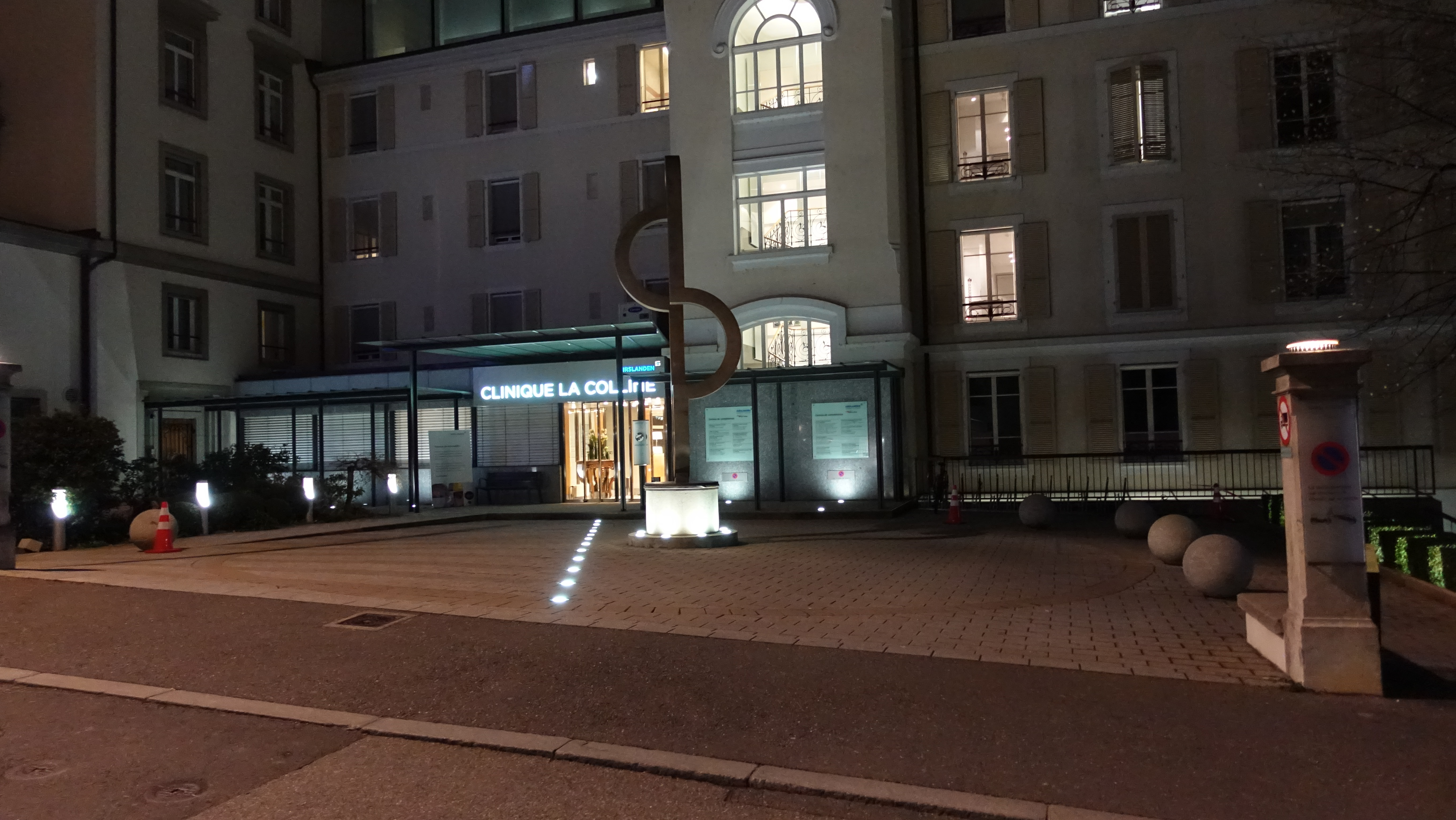
- Industry: Medicine
- Founded: 1903 / 2014
- Key people: Stéphan Studer (CEO)
- Revenue: 64 million CHF (2015/16)
- Number of employees: 281 (2015/16)
- Website: Clinique La Colline

Hirslanden Clinique La Colline is a Swiss hospital located in Geneva, Switzerland. Founded in 1903, it has been part of the Hirslanden Private Hospital Group since 2014.

== History ==
In 1903, a group of nuns from the Trinitarian Order of Avignon, forced to leave France as a result of religious persecution, took up residence in Geneva. Aided by local doctors, they founded a home to care for sick people of all religious beliefs. This home was Clinique La Colline, and included 15 rooms. In 1904 the first operating room was installed. Geneva doctors schooled the nuns in how to provide medical care. Clinique La Colline’s success meant that it very rapidly became necessary to build an annex, in order to have more rooms, and add a second operating room. The newly-enlarged Clinique La Colline had a capacity of 40 beds. A new wing was added in 1925, and in 1950 the nuns began to be assisted and gradually replaced by laypersons. In 1974, the north wing was extended to accommodate the operating theater and the radiology department, and in 1990 an outpatient clinic, a physiotherapy department and a fourth operating room were added. With the arrival of computers in 1984, the administrative aspects of Clinique La Colline were also entrusted to laypersons. In 2011, it was bought by the families Picciotto, Gherardi and Paul Hökfelt. The clinic then grew consistently with the creation of about 30 associated medical offices and an emergency department in 2012. Subsequently, an extension of the clinic was inaugurated in 2013.

The Hirslanden Private Hospital Group acquired Clinique La Colline for $146 million in 2014.

Stéphan Studer became Clinical Director of Clinique La Colline in 2015.

== Key figures & infrastructure ==
Following an extension in 2013, Clinique La Colline has 100 rooms and suites, one emergency department, six operating rooms and one polyclinic. It has 281 employees and 150 physicians for 3'784 patients in 2015.

== Centres and institutes ==
Clinique La Colline houses over 20 consultation practices, an analysis laboratory and medical samples, an orthopedic department, a neurosurgery and back surgery department, a general surgery department as well as many other specialised centers such as an emergency department, a radiology department, a physiotherapy unit, a spa pool and a check-up department.

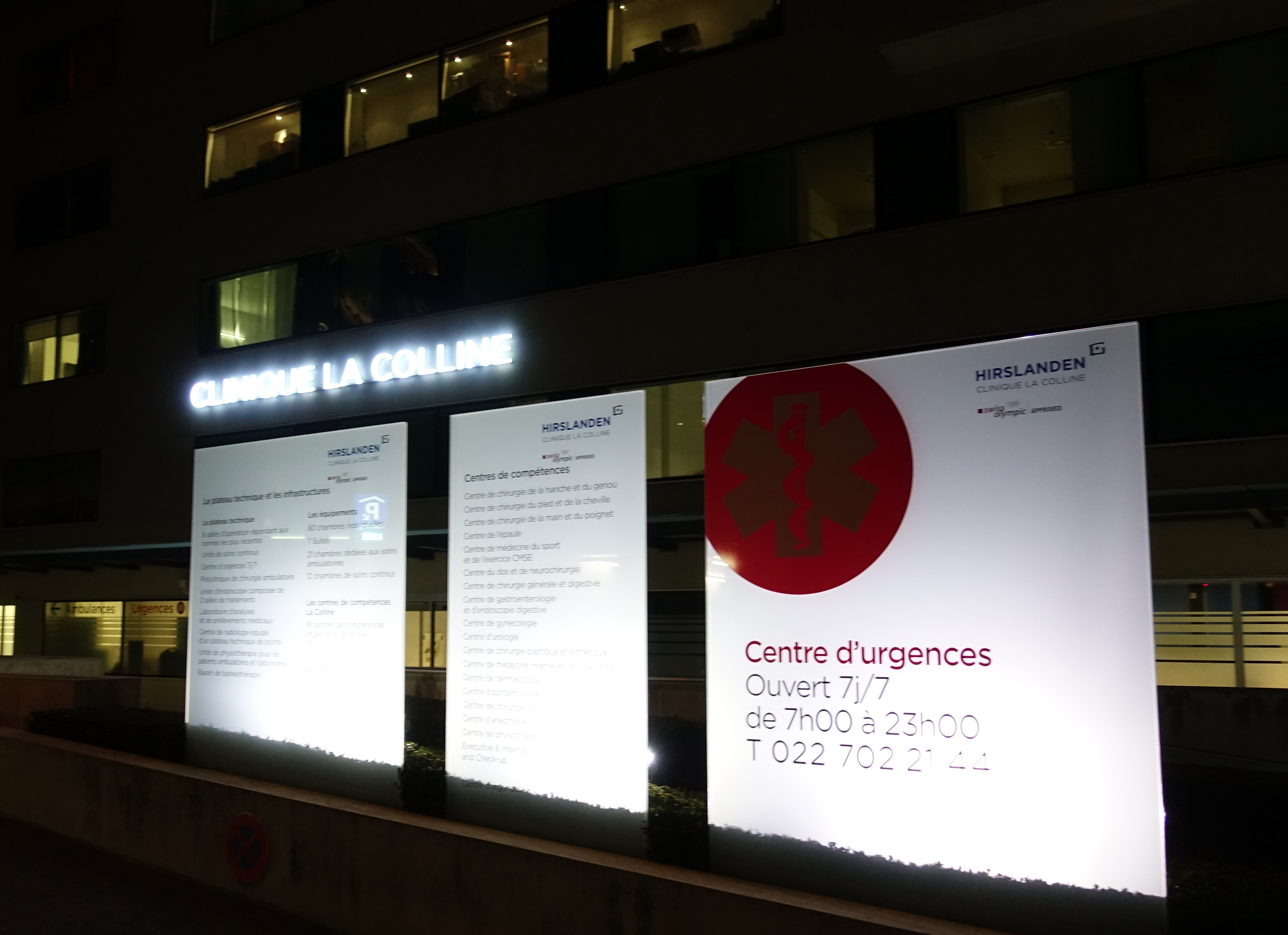
Centre d'urgences, an Emergency Center, at the Clinique la Colline

== Specialisations ==
The main specialties of Clinique La Colline are anesthesiology, angiology, cardiac and thoracic vascular surgery, cardiology, checkup, clinical emergency medicine (SGNOR), dermatology and venereology, gastroenterology, general internal medicine, general surgery and traumatology (accident surgery), geriatrics, gynaecology, hematology, hand surgery, infectology, intensive care, maxillo-facial surgery, medical analysis laboratory FAMH, medical oncology, neurology, neurosurgery, ophthalmic surgery, ophthalmology, oral and maxillofacial surgery, orthopaedic surgery and traumatology, otorhinolaryngology, physical medicine and rehabilitation, plastic, reconstructive and cosmetic surgery, pneumology, psychiatry and psychotherapy, radiology, rheumatology, spine surgery, sports medicine, surgery, urology, visceral surgery.

== Number of patients by medical field ==
Medical field	Number of inpatients in 2015 / 2016
Orthopedics / Sports medicine	2174
Gynaecology / Obstetrics	55
Surgery / Visceral surgery	488
Internal medicine	397
Urology	156
Neurosurgery	220
Otorhinolaryngology	14
Heart surgery / Thoracic surgery / Vascular surgery	43
Gastroenterology	17
Ophthalmology	129
Plastic surgery	45
Oral and maxillofacial surgery	46

== ANQ ==
Clinique La Colline is a member of the National Association for the development of quality in hospitals and clinics (ANQ).

== Official Website ==
- Clinique La Colline
