= Clinique Cecil =

Hospital in Lausanne, Switzerland

Coordinates: 46.5202856°N 6.6215452°E

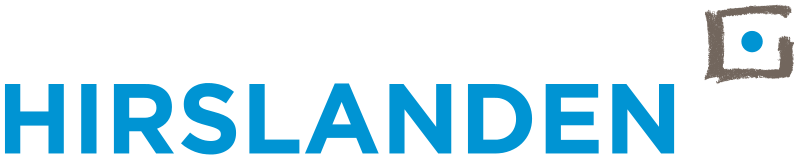

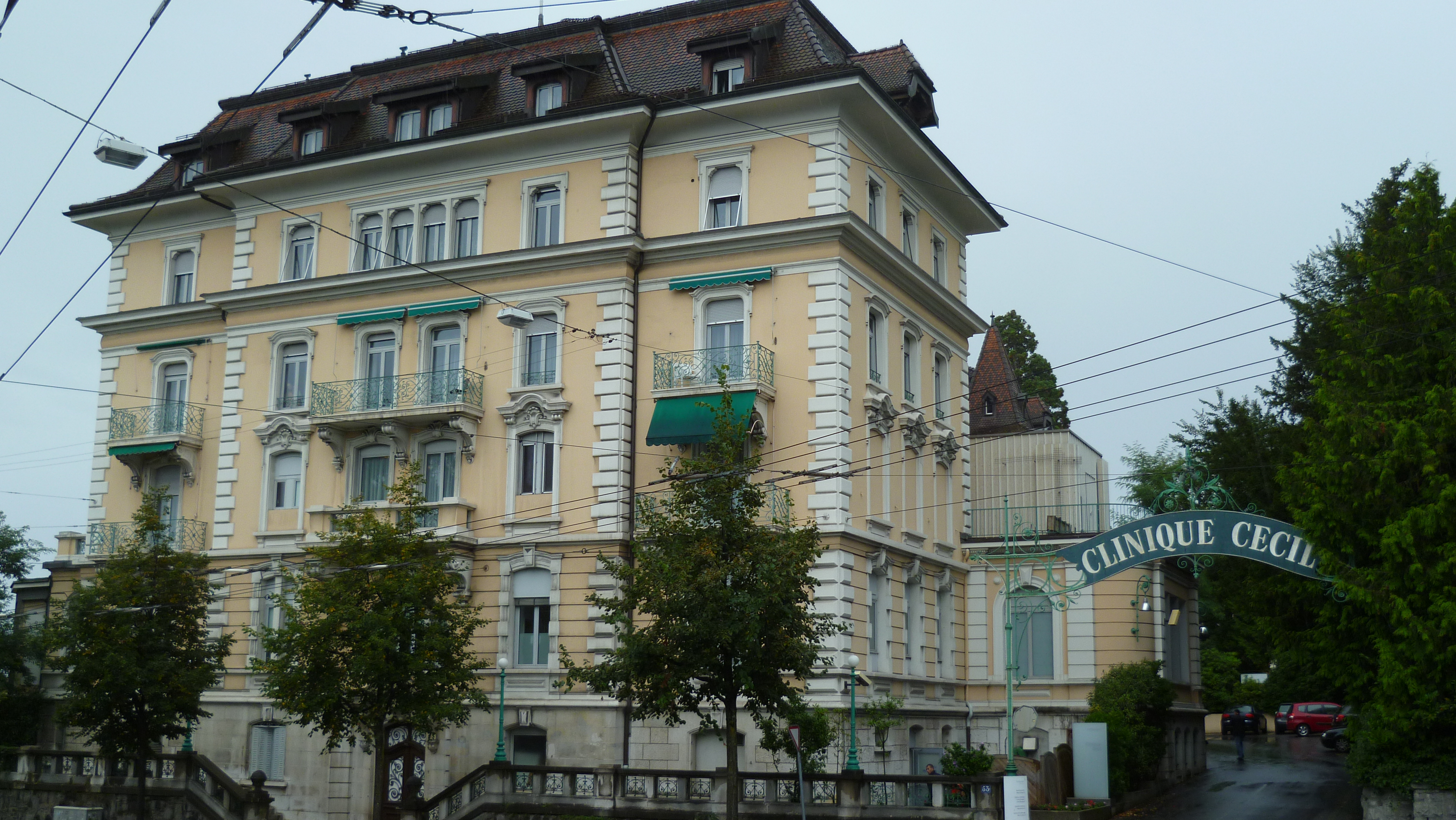
- Industry: Medicine
- Founded: 1931 / 1990
- Key people: Jean-Claude Chatelain (CEO)
- Revenue: 96 million CHF (2015/16)
- Number of employees: 474 (2015/16)
- Website: Clinique Cecil

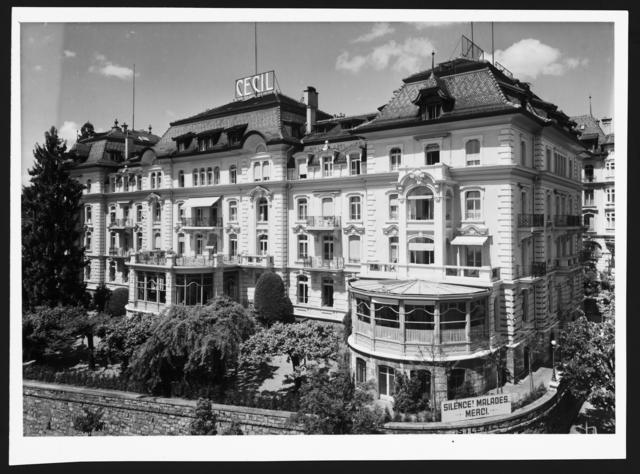

Hirslanden Clinique Cecil is a Swiss hospital, located in Lausanne, Vaud. Founded in 1931, it has been part of the Hirslanden Private Hospital Group since 1990. During the 2015/16 fiscal year, 3,974 hospitalised patients were treated by 391 physicians.

The emergency department of Clinique Cecil is the official medical partner of Bertrand Piccard and André Borschberg’s world tour for Solar Impulse.

== History ==
Clinique Cecil was originally a hotel, built between 1905 and 1907 by architect Charles Melley. In 1931, the hotel was refurbished as a clinic by Georges Espitaux. In 1923, Soviet envoy Vatslav Vorovsky was assassinated by expat Maurice Conradi in the busy hotel restaurant, and his subsequent trial became an international sensation. In 1972, the clinic was bought by the American Medical International group. In 1990, the Hirslanden Private Hospital Group bought Clinique Cecil.

In 2012, following a strategic realignment, Pierre-Frédéric Guex left office after 17 years of service. He was replaced by Philipp Teubner who resigned in June 2015. Today, the clinic is directed by Jean-Claude Chatelain.

== Key figures & infrastructure ==
In 2016, Clinique Cecil has 474 employees, 391 physicians, 86 beds, 6 operating rooms, including 1 hybrid, and 2 birthing rooms. Hirslanden Clinique Cecil recorded 3'974 patients in 2016.

The clinic also has an intensive care unit of 7 beds recognised by the Swiss Society of Intensive Care Medicine.

In 2013/14, Clinique Cecil contributed 6.4% to the turnover of the Hirslanden Private Hospital Group.

In November 2015, Clinique Cecil expanded its infrastructure with the creation of a 900 m2 building. The new infrastructure includes Switzerland's first hybrid operation room integrating conventional operating room equipment with high-end radiology equipment.

== Centres and institutes ==
Clinique Cecil includes an interventional outpatient department, a multidisciplinary pain department, a maternity and obstetrics gynaecology department, a dialysis department, a physiotherapy and osteopathy department, a multi-site radiology institute and a cardiovascular department.

== Specialisations ==
The main specialties of Clinique Cecil are allergology and immunology, anesthesiology, angiology, cardiac and thoracic vascular, surgery, cardiology, endocrinology / diabetology, gastroenterology, general internal medicine, gynaecology and obstetrics, hand surgery, infectology, intensive care, nephrology, neurology, neurosurgery, oral and maxillofacial surgery, otorhinolaryngology, plastic, reconstructive and cosmetic surgery, pneumology, radiology, rheumatology, spine surgery, surgery, thoracic surgery, urology.

== Number of patients by medical field ==
Medical field	Number of inpatients in 2015 / 2016
Orthopedics / Sports medicine	5
Obstetrics / Gynaecology	1077
Surgery / Visceral surgery	614
Internal medicine	481
Urology	354
Oncology / Haematology	22
Angiology / Vascular surgery	142
Gastroenterology	7
Neurosurgery	286
Plastic surgery	76
Cardiology	522
Hand surgery	5
Cardiac surgery / Thoracic vascular surgery	262
Oral and maxillofacial surgery	2
Thoracic surgery	80
Nephrology	15
Other fields	24

== Official Website ==
- Clinique Cecil
