= Clinique Bois-Cerf =

Hospital in Lausanne, Switzerland

Coordinates: 46.5120156°N 6.6297668°E

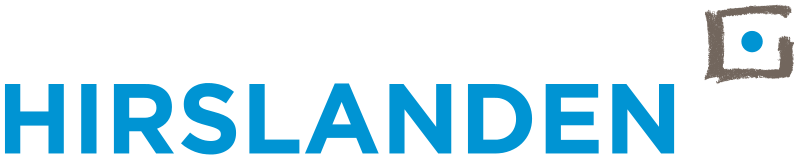
- Industry: Medicine
- Founded: 1685 / 1998
- Key people: Cédric Bossart (CEO)
- Revenue: 78 million CHF (2015/16)
- Number of employees: 347 (2015/16)
- Website: Clinique Bois-Cerf

Hirslanden Clinique Bois-Cerf is a hospital located in Lausanne, Vaud, Switzerland. Founded in 1685, it has been part of the Hirslanden Private Hospital Group since 1998. During the 2015/16 fiscal year, 3,849 hospitalised patients were treated by 347 doctors.

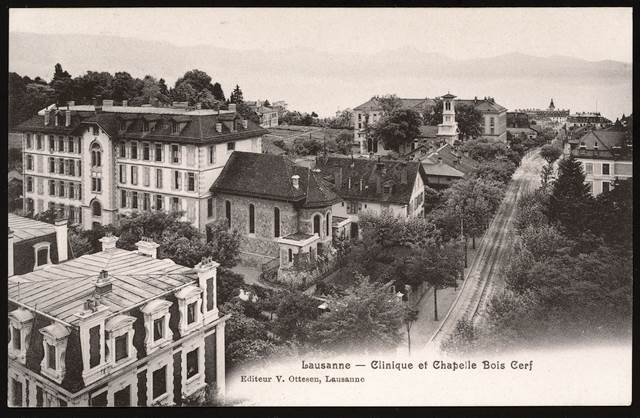
Type

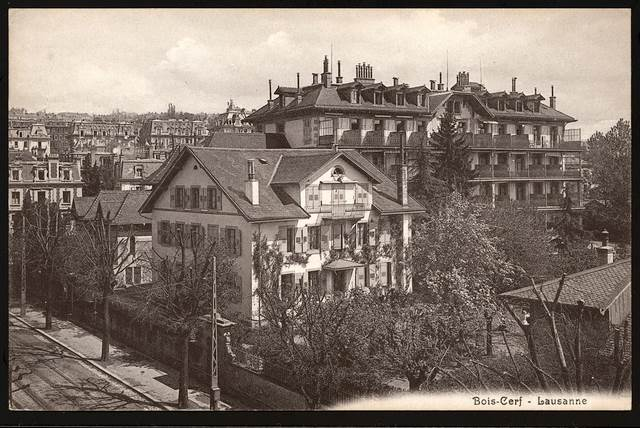
Type

== History ==
Founded in 1685 by a French religious community called "Religieuses Trinitaires", they start renting a villa called "Le Petit Bois-Cerf" on the actual site in 1892 taking care of the sick and poor persons. A first building is built in 1902 and replaced in 1980 by the actual building. The "Religieuses Trinitaires" sold the clinic in 1987. Clinique Bois-Cerf has been part of the Hirslanden Private Hospital Group since 1998. A major renovation of the clinic was completed in 2003. To date, the clinic is directed by Cédric Bossart.

== Centres and institutes ==
Clinique Bois-Cerf includes an orthopaedic surgery department, an "active+" department (physiotherapy, osteopathy, occupational gymnastics and aerobics), an ophthalmology department, an obesity multidisciplinary department, a lithotripsy institute, an oncology department, a multi-site radiology institute, a radiation oncology institute and a Sportlab.

== Key figures & infrastructure ==
Clinique Bois-Cerf employs 347 physicians, has 68 beds and five operating rooms.

In 2013 and 2014, Hirslanden Clinique Bois-Cerf contributed 4.8% to the turnover of the Hirslanden Private Hospital Group.

== Number of patients by medical field ==
Medical field	Number of inpatients in 2015 / 2016
Orthopedics / Sports medicine	2'603
Surgery / Visceral surgery	41
Internal medicine	69
Urology	258
Oncology / Haematology	297
Plastic surgery	26
Hand surgery	162
Oral and maxillofacial surgery	15
Otorhinolaryngology	92
Pulmonology	7
Ophthalmology	24
Anesthesia / Pain therapy	19
Rheumatology / Physical medicine and rehabilitation	5
Neurology	1
Radiology / Neuroradiology	198
Radio-oncology / Radiotherapy	9
Other fields	23

== Specialisations ==
The main specialties of Clinique Bois-Cerf are allergology and immunology, anesthesiology, angiology, endocrinology / diabetology, gastroenterology, general internal medicine, gynaecology, hand Surgery, infectology, neurology, ophthalmology, oral and maxillofacial surgery, orthopaedic surgery and traumatology, otorhinolaryngology, pediatric surgery, physical medicine and rehabilitation, plastic, reconstructive and cosmetic surgery, pneumology, radio-oncology / radiotherapy, radiology, rheumatology, spine surgery, surgery, urology.

== Official Website ==
- Clinique Bois-Cerf
