= Vatslav Vorovsky =

Russian revolutionary and diplomat (1871–1923)

- Вацлав Воровский
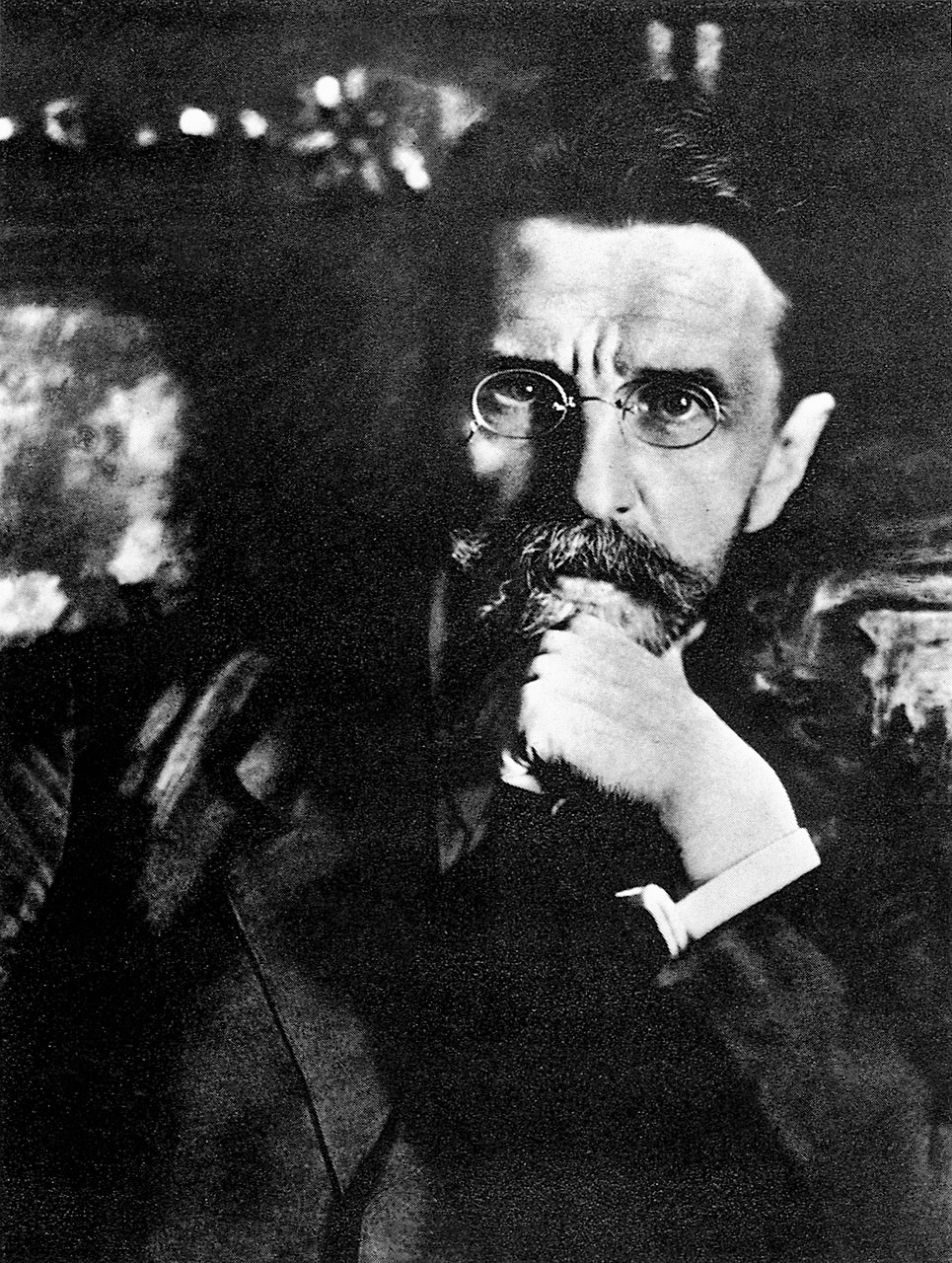

RSFSR/Soviet Ambassador to Italy
- In office 14 March 1921 – 10 May 1923
- Preceded by: Mikhail von Giers
- Succeeded by: Nikolai Iordansky

RSFSR Ambassador to Sweden
- In office November 1917 – 1919
- Preceded by: Konstantin Gulkevich
- Succeeded by: Platon Kerzhentsev

RSFSR Ambassador to Denmark
- In office November 1917 – 1919
- Preceded by: Matvey Sevastopulo (envoy)
- Succeeded by: Tsezar Gein

RSFSR Ambassador to Norway
- In office November 1917 – 1919
- Preceded by: Dmitry Kotzebue (Charge d'Affaires)
- Succeeded by: Alexandra Kollontai

Personal details
- Born: 27 October 1871 Moscow, Russian Empire
- Died: 10 May 1923 (aged 51) Lausanne, Switzerland
- Cause of death: Assassination by gunshot
- Resting place: Kremlin Wall Necropolis, Moscow
- Party: RSDLP
- Education: Imperial Moscow Technical School; Moscow State University
- Occupation: Diplomat, journalist, literary critic
- Nickname(s): P. Orlovsky, Y. Adamovich, M. Schwarz, Josephine, Felix Alexandrovich

Vatslav Vatslavovich Vorovsky (Russian: Ва́цлав Ва́цлавович Воро́вский; 27 October [O.S. 15 October] 1871 – 10 May 1923) was a Russian Bolshevik revolutionary, literary critic, journalist, and Soviet diplomat. One of the first Soviet diplomats, Vorovsky is best remembered as the victim of a May 1923 political assassination in Switzerland, where he was the official representative of the Soviet government to the Conference of Lausanne.

== Biography ==
=== Early years ===
Vatslav Vorovsky was born on 27 October 1871 (n.s.) in Moscow, the son of an ethnically Polish but Russified noble and engineer. His father died when he was a year old, and he was raised by his mother. Following the completion of secondary school. In 1890, Vorovsky enrolled at the University of Moscow, where he was exposed to the ideas of political radicalism.

=== Political career ===
In his autobiography, Vorovsky dated his involvement with the socialist movement from 1894, when he made contact with workers' circles in Moscow. He was arrested by the Tsarist secret police in 1897, held for two years in Taganka Prison, then exiled in 1899 to the city of Orlov. Upon his release, Vorovsky adopted a new underground pseudonym, "P. Orlovsky", as a tribute to this experience. During the course of his underground career, Vorovsky also used the pseudonyms "Y. Adamovich", "M. Schwarz", "Josephine", and "Felix Alexandrovich".

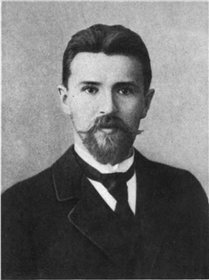
A young Vorovsky in 1899

Vorovsky emigrated to Europe in 1902, spending time in Italy, Germany, and Switzerland. He acted as an agent for the newspaper Iskra, founded abroad by Vladimir Lenin. From 1903, he acted as a liaison between the Bolshevik faction of the Russian Social Democratic Labor Party and Polish socialists. During 1904, he was based in Odesa, Ukraine, but emigrated again in August 1904, to help launch the first exclusively Bolshevik publication, Vperyod (Forward), of which he was an editor.

During the Russian Revolution of 1905, Vorovsky returned to Russia, working actively as a revolutionary in St. Petersburg. Following the defeat of the 1905 uprising he moved to Odesa, where he was a leading underground Bolshevik from 1907 to 1912. In 1912, Vorovsky was arrested again, this time to be deported to Vologda province, in Russia. In 1915, he moved to Stockholm, where he worked as an engineer for the Swedish Lux company and for Siemens-Schuckert. In 1917, after the February Revolution in Russia, Vorovsky was appointed to three-man Bolshevik Stockholm Bureau, along with Karl Radek and Yakov Hanecki.

Vorovsky was the first director of Gosizdat, the State Publishing House, from its foundation in 1919 until 1921.

=== Diplomatic career ===
Following the victory of the Bolshevik Revolution in November 1917, Vorovsky was named the Soviet government's diplomatic representative to Scandinavia, remaining based in Stockholm. In Stockholm, Vorovsky was the point of contact between the new Bolshevik government and representatives of the government of Germany, being introduced by Alexander Parvus to members of the Social-Democratic Party of Germany including Philipp Scheidemann during November and December 1917.

In December 1918, Sweden, responding to pressure on the part of the Allied powers who were intent upon imposing an unbreakable blockade, withdrew official recognition of Vorovsky as the representative of Soviet Russia. This action on the part of the Swedish government forced Vorovsky's return to Russia the following month. This action taken against Vorovsky followed the actions taken by Great Britain in expelling Maxim Litvinov in September 1918 and that of Germany in expelling Adolph Joffe in November of that same year.

In March 1919, Vorovsky served as a member of the Soviet delegation to the Founding Congress of the Communist International. He was named the representative of the Russian Communist Party to the Executive Committee of the Comintern. He also served as one of the secretaries of the organization, along with Angelica Balabanova. Grigorii Zinoviev was tapped as president of the organization.

In July 1920, Vorovsky resumed work as a Soviet diplomat, participating in diplomatic negotiations with Poland.

From 1921 to 1923, Vorovsky was the Soviet representative to Italy. In that capacity he was involved in attempts at negotiation of a trade agreement between the two countries, with a preliminary pact signed in December 1921. This success proved short-lived, however, as negotiations to extend the six-month treaty failed in May 1922.

Vorovsky was a member of the Soviet delegation to the 1922 Genoa Conference, a group headed by Soviet Foreign Minister Georgii Chicherin.

=== Death and legacy ===
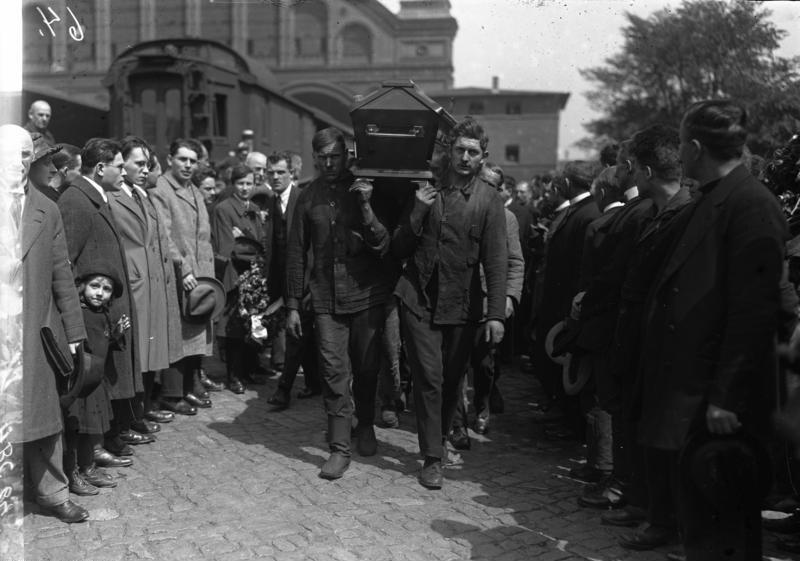
Coffin of Vorovsky being carried in Berlin

Vorovsky's final diplomatic mission came in the spring of 1923, when he served as Soviet representative to the Lausanne conference of 1923. Accompanied by two diplomatic attachés, Vorovsky arrived in Lausanne from Rome on April 27, hoping to force the conference's official participants to recognize Soviet interests in the Turkish Black Sea Straits.

On May 9, Vorovsky dispatched his final report to Moscow, noting that three days earlier a group of right wing youths had appeared at his hotel and sought a meeting. Vorovsky wrote:

"I refused to receive them, and Comrade Ahrens, who went out to them to find out what it was all about, disposed of them at once, telling them that they should put such matters before their Government. Now they are going about the town declaring that they will compel us to leave Switzerland by force, and so on. "As to whether the police are taking any measures for our safety, we have no idea. At any rate, it is not apparent on the surface. It is only too evident that behind these hooligan boys there is some conscious directing hand — possibly foreign. The Swiss Government, well aware of what is going on — for the papers are full of it — must bear responsibility for our safety. The behaviour of the Swiss Government is a shameful violation of the guarantees given at the beginning of the conference, and any attack on us in this particularly well-organised country is only possible with the knowledge and permission of the authorities. On them is the responsibility."

On the evening of 10 May 1923, Vorovsky was seated at a dining table in the restaurant of his hotel with his colleagues when the group was approached by an individual they did not know. The unknown figure, a Russian White émigré named Maurice Conradi, pulled a gun and shot Vorovsky to death, wounding his two companions, Ahrens and Divilkovsky, in the attack. Conradi was defended by the advocate Théodore Aubert and later acquitted by the Swiss court in the epilogue of what would be known as the Conradi affair.

Vatslav Vorovsky was 51 years old at the time of his death. He is buried in Mass Grave No. 7 of the Kremlin Wall Necropolis in Red Square, Moscow.

== Memory ==
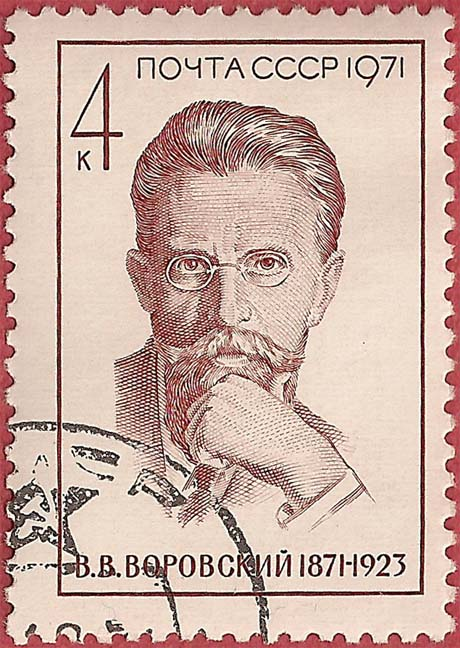
Image of Vorovsky on a Soviet stamp, 1971

A number of settlements and streets in dozens of cities in the USSR were named after Vorovsky under Soviet rule. Among the significant renaming: Kiev Khreshchatyk, which was renamed into Vorovskogo Street between 1923 and 1937.

In Moscow, on 11 May 1924, in the courtyard of a former apartment building of the First Russian Insurance Company, a bronze monument of Vorovsky was erected under the project of sculptor Mikhail Kats. In connection with the installation of the monument and the demolition of the Vvedenskaya church located at the corner of Kuznetsky Most and Bolshaya Lubyanka, the vacated place was named Vorovsky Square.

A poem by Vladimir Mayakovsky, titled Vorovsky, was dedicated to him in honor of his death.

The Palaces of Culture in the city of Konakovo, Tver region and in the city of Ramenskoye, Moscow region were named after Vatslav Vorovsky.

In 1990, the Russian Coast Guard launched a Menzhinskiy-class (project 11351 - NATO Krivak III Class) ship named for Vorovskiy (Воровский 160).

== Works ==
- Советъ против партии (The Council Against the Party). Geneva: Bonch-Bruevich and Lenin Publishing House of Social-Democratic Party Literature, November 1904. —Reissued by Partizdat, 1933.
- Литературно-критические статьи (Literary-Critical Articles). Moscow: Gospolitizdat, 1948.

== See also ==
- Alexander Griboyedov, Russian ambassador to Persia, assassinated in 1829
- Pyotr Voykov, Soviet ambassador to Poland, assassinated in 1927
- Andrei Karlov, Russian ambassador to Turkey, assassinated in 2016
