= Psychiatric hospitals in Switzerland =

Overview of psychiatric institutions and mental health facilities in Switzerland

Psychiatric hospitals in Switzerland encompass a network of public and private institutions dedicated to mental health care, ranging from acute psychiatric units to long-term residential facilities. The Swiss psychiatric care system operates under a framework of federal oversight and cantonal implementation, with significant developments in patient rights and treatment approaches occurring throughout the 20th and 21st centuries.

== Current system and legal framework ==
The contemporary Swiss psychiatric hospital system operates under the federal Civil Code and cantonal health legislation. Psychiatric institutions include general hospital psychiatric units, specialized psychiatric hospitals, and residential care facilities for individuals with mental health conditions.

=== Placement procedures ===
Swiss law provides for involuntary psychiatric hospitalization through Placement for Assistance Purposes (PAP) (German: Fürsorgerische Unterbringung; French: Placement à des fins d'assistance, PAFA; Italian: Ricovero a scopo di assistenza) under Article 426 of the Civil Code. Such placements may be ordered by authorized physicians or Child and Adult Protection Authorities (German: Kindes- und Erwachsenenschutzbehörde, KESB; French: autorité de protection de l’enfant et de l’adulte, APEA; Italian: Autorità di protezione dei minori e degli adulti, APMA) when individuals with psychiatric disorders, intellectual disabilities, or severe neglect cannot receive necessary care through other means.

PAP represents a drastic limitation of personal freedom guaranteed under Article 10 of the Swiss Constitution, as placed individuals lose their right to choose residence, meal times and content, and may be restricted in movement or subjected to non-consensual medical treatments. Due to this severe impact on personal liberty, PAP can only be implemented as a last resort (ultima ratio) when no other less restrictive measures can achieve the protective purpose.

The legal framework distinguishes between voluntary admissions and involuntary placements. Medical placements (Articles 429-430 CC) can last up to six weeks before requiring confirmation by an KESB, while the institution has authority to discharge patients during this period. Physicians ordering medical PAP must personally examine the patient, conduct a hearing, and provide written decisions directly to the patient and, when possible, to a close relative. Adult Protection Authorities are interdisciplinary bodies comprising legal professionals and specialists such as psychologists, psychiatrists, and social workers.

For patients voluntarily admitted who develop psychiatric disorders, chief physicians may retain them for up to three days if they pose danger to themselves or others, after which formal PAP procedures must be initiated unless the patient can leave voluntarily.

=== Patient rights and protections ===
Swiss psychiatric patients have specific rights including the designation of a trusted person to assist during their stay, participation in treatment planning, and access to legal recourse. Treatment plans must be established in writing with patient involvement, though implementation of these requirements varies across institutions.

Patients have the right to designate a trusted person of their choice under Article 432 CC to assist during their stay, visit them, participate in treatment plan development, undertake procedures, and provide legal defense. However, institutions often fail to systematically inform patients of this right, and many patients lack close relationships due to social isolation from mental illness.

Treatment during PAP must follow a written plan established with the patient and their trusted person according to Article 433 CC. Swiss Federal Court jurisprudence has clarified that treatment without consent occurs not only under physical coercion but also when patients consent due to threats of forced administration or after previous forced treatment. Treatment under threat of isolation also constitutes non-consensual treatment.

Non-consensual medical treatment is permitted only for patients lacking capacity to understand treatment necessity, and only treatments specified in the jointly established treatment plan may be administered without consent. Advance directives are not binding during non-consensual treatment but must be considered to respect patient autonomy as much as possible.

Restraint measures limiting movement for patients lacking capacity are authorized under Article 438 CC, including room isolation, electronic surveillance, or physical restraints. However, sedation through medication cannot be considered a restraint measure and must be treated as medical treatment requiring inclusion in the treatment plan.

=== Legal appeals and oversight ===
Patients and their representatives have extensive legal recourse options against PAP decisions and treatment measures. Medical PAP decisions can be appealed to the KESB within 10 days by the patient, close relatives, or trusted persons. If appeals are rejected, judicial recourse remains possible without requiring written justification, with judicial authorities required to personally hear the patient and decide within 5 working days.

Appeals against KESB-ordered placements can be made under Article 450 CC by patients, relatives, or trusted persons. Patients have the right to personal hearings and legal representation by persons experienced in assistance and legal matters, though the law does not require qualified attorneys.

Challenges arise when attempting to contest completed PAP or treatment measures, as courts require demonstration of current legal interest. Patients wishing to challenge past placements or treatments must typically pursue civil courts through damage claims or tort actions, with a three-year prescription period from knowledge of damage.

== Historical development ==
=== Medieval period to 19th century ===
The origins of Swiss psychiatric institutions trace back to medieval hospitals and leproseries. Medieval hospitals served multiple functions including care for travelers, elderly persons, widows, orphans, incurable patients, and individuals with mental illness, often functioning as prisons as well.

The late medieval municipal movement led to new hospital foundations in numerous Swiss cities during the 13th, 14th, and 15th centuries, including Saint Gall, Winterthur, Schaffhausen, and Bern. However, the early 16th century marked a significant shift in assistance policy throughout central and western Europe.

This reform introduced strict distinctions between indigenous and foreign poor, and between those deemed "worthy" and "unworthy" of assistance. The new approach emphasized place of origin criteria, work requirements, and increasingly severe prohibitions on begging. This evolution created distinct treatment categories and led to the systematic use of internment, beginning in Holland and spreading throughout continental Europe in what historians termed the "great confinement."

=== Early modern period ===
The Amsterdam houses of discipline for men and women (Rasphuis, Spinhuis), established in 1595-1596, served as models throughout Switzerland. Most Swiss cities adapted their existing hospitals to include disciplinary or forced labor sections. New foundations emerged in the early 17th century, including Geneva's Disciplinary House (1631), Zurich (1637), Bern (1657), Saint Gall (1661), and Basel (1667).

These hybrid establishments played a crucial role in asylum development, combining poor assistance with penal aspects through forced labor aimed at moral rehabilitation. Internal regulations enforced discipline through work schedules, cleanliness standards, and sanctions including corporal punishment and isolation.

=== 19th century specialization ===
The 19th century, termed "the century of the asylum," witnessed significant differentiation in institutional functions. The medieval multifunctionality gave way to specialization, resulting in numerous independent establishments. This process began with orphanage separation from hospitals in the early 17th century, with definitive separation between children and adults occurring in the late 18th century under Enlightenment educational influences.

The Swiss Society for Public Utility addressed poverty from an educational perspective, leading to alternative institutions for abandoned children including Bächtelen near Bern (1840) and Sonnenberg near Lucerne (1859). These institutes, inspired by Johann Heinrich Pestalozzi, Johann Jakob Wehrli, and Philipp Emanuel von Fellenberg's model establishments, emphasized work education in agricultural and later industrial settings.

For adults with mental illness, the differentiation process, combined with medical advances in psychiatry, resulted in several new clinics: Geneva (1838), Sankt Pirminsberg (Pfäfers) (1847), Waldau (Bern) (1855), and Mendrisio (1898). Specialized establishments for individuals with intellectual disabilities were also created, including Abendberg (Interlaken) (1841), Hottingen (1849), Basel (1857), and Bern (1868).

=== 20th century developments ===
Institutional accommodation for poor, sick, marginalized, or delinquent individuals remained a recognized assistance approach well into the 20th century. This policy relied on a fragmented institutional landscape comprising hundreds of public and private establishments. While hospitals modernized during the first half of the 20th century alongside developing social insurance systems, social institutions, particularly in psychiatry, evolved more slowly.

Despite specialization attempts based on age, gender, and hospitalization reasons, diverse populations continued to cohabit within single institutions. Individuals with disabilities were sometimes placed in psychiatric establishments, administratively detained persons imprisoned with delinquents, and adolescents transferred to adult facilities.

Chronic underfunding and staff shortages resulted in precarious living and working conditions marked by violence through the 1960s and beyond. The lack of therapeutic and pedagogical approaches negatively impacted integration and educational opportunities for residents, particularly children and adolescents in residential facilities.

Political and administrative reforms led by expert groups and associations significantly impacted penal establishment modernization. The 1942 Swiss Penal Code enabled renovation of deteriorated penitentiary buildings. However, legally mandated separation of detainee categories was not achieved even after implementing three regional concordats on penalty execution (1956, 1959, 1963).

=== Deinstitutionalization movement ===
Repression and institutional dysfunction faced regular criticism, particularly from intellectuals and writers such as Friedrich Glauser and Peter Surava. Carl Albert Loosli denounced authoritarian educational practices in his polemical novel Anstaltsleben (1924). Various scandals, including the 1944 Sonnenberg correctional facility incident in Kriens, revealed through Paul Senn's photographic reportage in Die Nation, concerned public opinion and politics without achieving comprehensive reform.

The 1970s saw renewed criticism from left-wing movements including the Heimkampagne, Aktion Strafvollzug, and anti-psychiatry movement, favoring long-term abandonment of inpatient treatments for outpatient therapies. Educational facility placements declined from the 1970s, while elderly individuals could remain at home longer through developing home care services (Spitex).

=== Modern psychiatric care ===
Psychiatric innovation included psychotropic drug introduction from 1953 in existing chronically overcrowded clinics. Psychiatric establishment opening and restructuring (notably Königsfelden in 1969 and Liestal in 1974), care specialization (Vaud from 1964), and outpatient and socio-psychiatric service expansion (day and night clinics, residential facilities) began around 1970.

Subsequently, available beds for inpatient stays decreased considerably through external care for patients requiring long-term treatment. Current outpatient services remain insufficient in Switzerland, partly due to tariff structure limitations.

The Federal Law on subsidies from the Confederation to establishments serving the execution of sentences and measures and to educational establishments (1967) initiated important reforms in children and adolescent residential facilities.

The United Nations Convention on the Rights of Persons with Disabilities (CRPD), effective in Switzerland since 2014, provided new momentum for deinstitutionalization, particularly for disability residential facilities and inpatient psychiatry, while asylum seeker placements remained relatively high compared to other countries.

== Bibliography ==
=== Medieval period to 19th century ===
- Foucault, Michel: Surveiller et punir. Naissance de la prison, 1975.
- Lescaze, Bernard: Sauver l'âme, nourrir le corps. De l'hôpital général à l'hospice général de Genève, 1535-1985, 1985.
- Geremek, Bronisław: La potence ou la pitié. L'Europe et les pauvres du Moyen Age à nos jours, 1987.
- Mayer, Marcel: Hilfsbedürftige und Delinquenten. Die Anstaltsinsassen der Stadt St. Gallen. 1750-1798, 1987.
- Schoch, Jürg; Tuggener, Heinrich; Wehrli, Daniel (éd.): Aufwachsen ohne Eltern. Verdingkinder, Heimkinder, Pflegekinder, Windenkinder. Zur ausserfamiliären Erziehung in der deutschsprachigen Schweiz, 1989.
- Mottu-Weber, Liliane; Piuz, Anne-Marie: L'économie genevoise, de la Réforme à la fin de l'Ancien Régime. XVIe-XVIIIe siècles, 1990.
- Heimverband Schweiz (éd.): Schritte zum Mitmenschen. 150 Jahre – vom VSA zum Heimverband, 1994.
- Finzsch, Norbert; Jütte, Robert: Institutions of Confinement. Hospitals, Asylums, and Prisons in Western Europe and North America, 1500-1950, 1996.

=== 20th century ===
- Meier, Marietta et al.: Zwang zur Ordnung. Psychiatrie im Kanton Zürich, 1870-1970, 2007.
- Baechtold, Andrea: Exécution des peines. L'exécution des peines et mesures concernant les adultes en Suisse, 2008.
- Fink, Daniel: Überwachen statt Einsperren. Die Freiheitsstrafe und ihre Zukunft in der Schweiz, 2009.
- Hafner, Urs: Heimkinder. Eine Geschichte des Aufwachsens in der Anstalt, 2011.
- Hafner, Wolfgang: Pädagogik, Heime, Macht – eine historische Analyse, 2014.
- Fink, Daniel; Schulthess, Peter M. (éd.): Strafrecht, Freiheitsentzug, Gefängnis. Ein Handbuch zur Entwicklung des Freiheitsentzugs in der Schweiz, 2015.
- Germann, Urs: "Entwicklungshilfe im Innern. Die Heimpolitik des Bundes im Zeichen sich wandelnder Staatlichkeit, 1960-1990", in: Criblez, Lucien; Rothen, Christina; Ruoss, Thomas (éd.): Staatlichkeit in der Schweiz. Regieren und Verwalten vor der neoliberalen Wende, 2016.
- Fink, Daniel: La prison en Suisse. Un état des lieux, 2017.
- Fink, Daniel: Freiheitsentzug in der Schweiz. Formen, Effizienz, Bedeutung, 2018.
- Gabriel, Thomas; Hauss, Gisela; Lengwiler, Martin (éd.): Fremdplatziert. Heimerziehung in der Schweiz, 1940-1990, 2018.
- Jenzer, Sabine; Meier, Thomas: "Die Zürcher Anstaltslandschaft 1876-2017", in: Gnädinger, Beat; Rothenbühler, Verena (éd.): Menschen korrigieren. Fürsorgerische Zwangsmassnahmen und Fremdplatzierungen im Kanton Zürich bis 1981, 2018.
- Zwangslagenleben. Biografien von ehemals administrativ versorgten Menschen, 2019.
- Zehntausende. Zahlen zur administrativen Versorgung und zur Anstaltslandschaft, 2019.
- Un quotidien sous contrainte. De l'internement à la libération, 2019.
- Ferreira, Cristina; Maugué, Ludovic; Maulini, Sandrine: L'Homme-bus. Une histoire des controverses psychiatriques (1960-1980), 2020.
- Marti, Simone: Innere Grenzziehungen. Das Nothilfe-Regime im schweizerischen Asylsystem, 2023.
