= Cape Town =

Legislative capital of South Africa

Cape Town: Kaapstad (Afrikaans); iKapa (Xhosa); ǁHui!gaeb (Khoekhoe)
- Capital city (legislative branch)
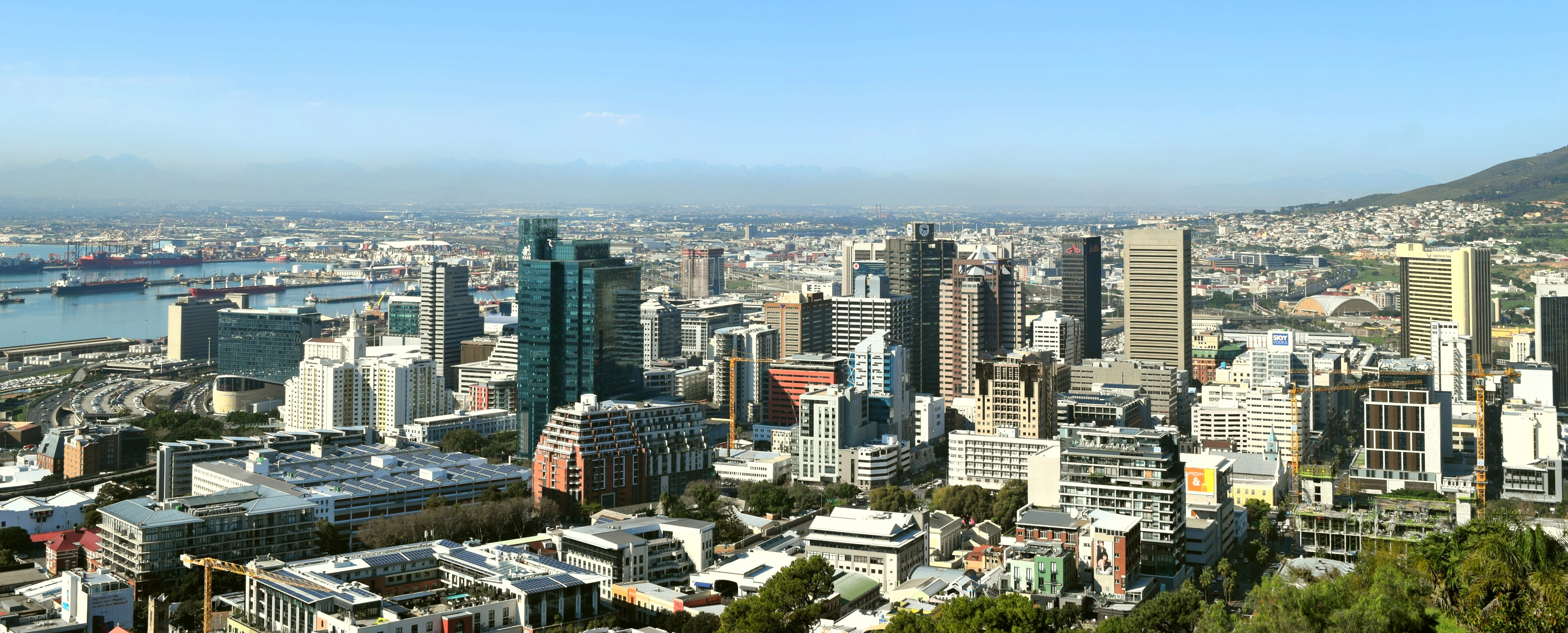
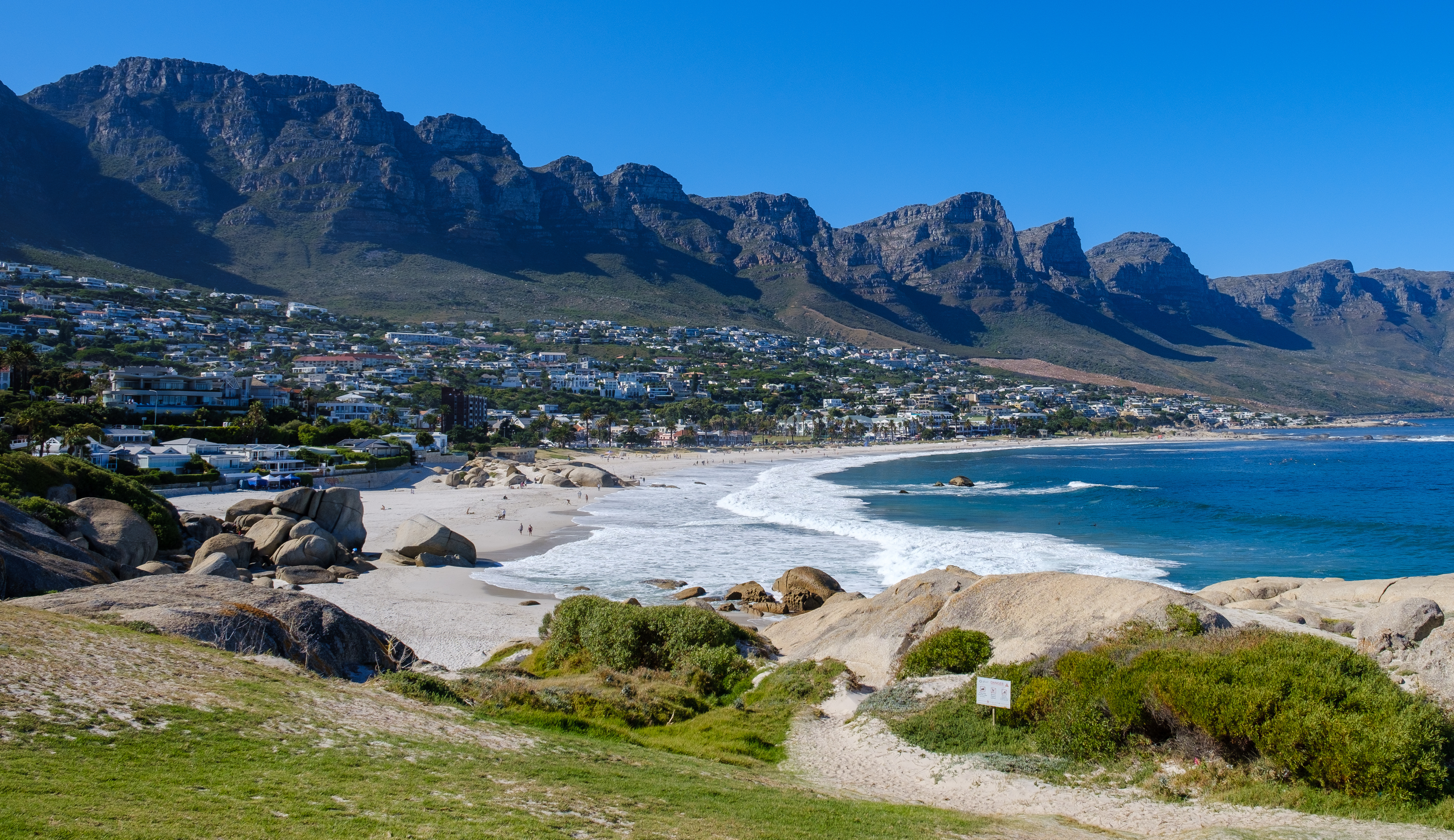
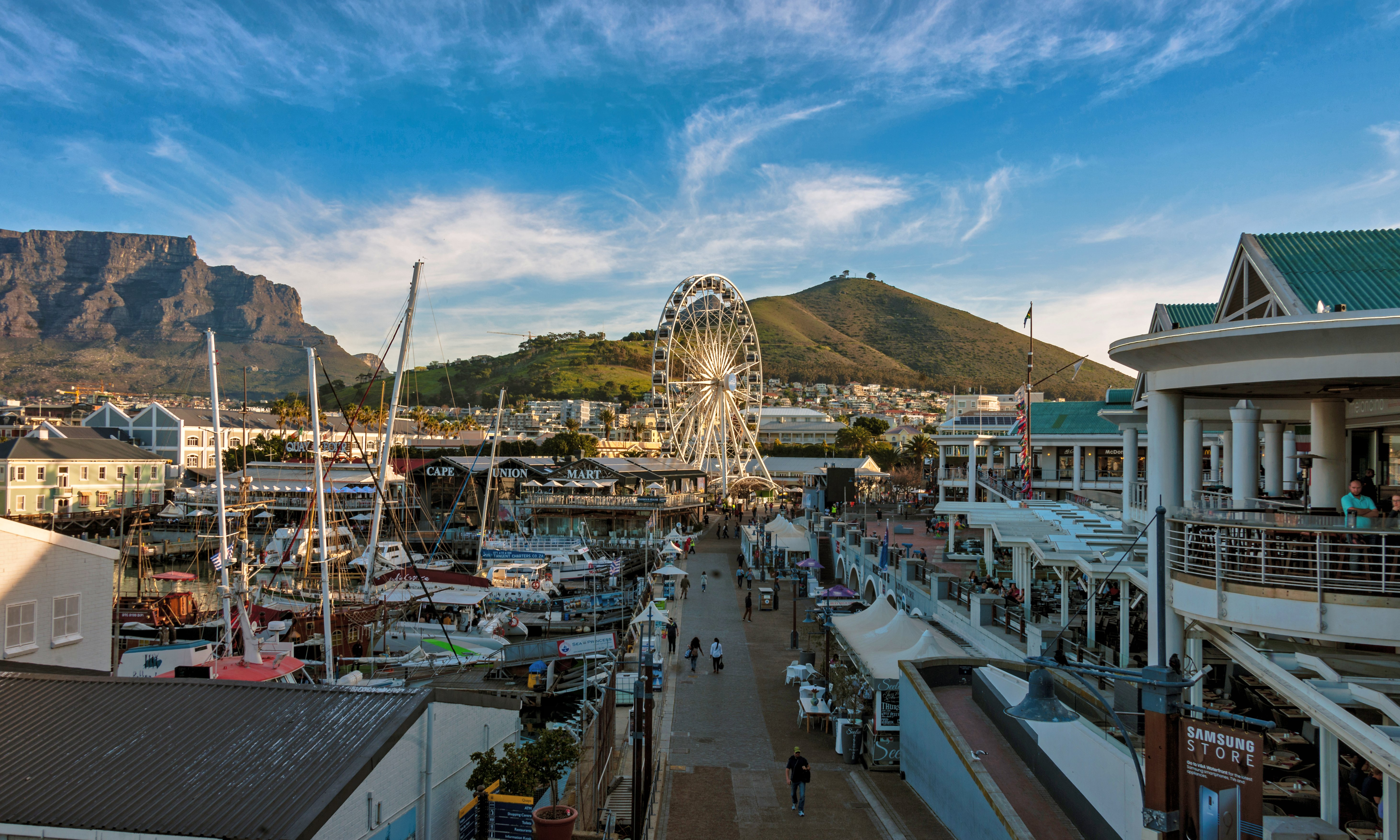
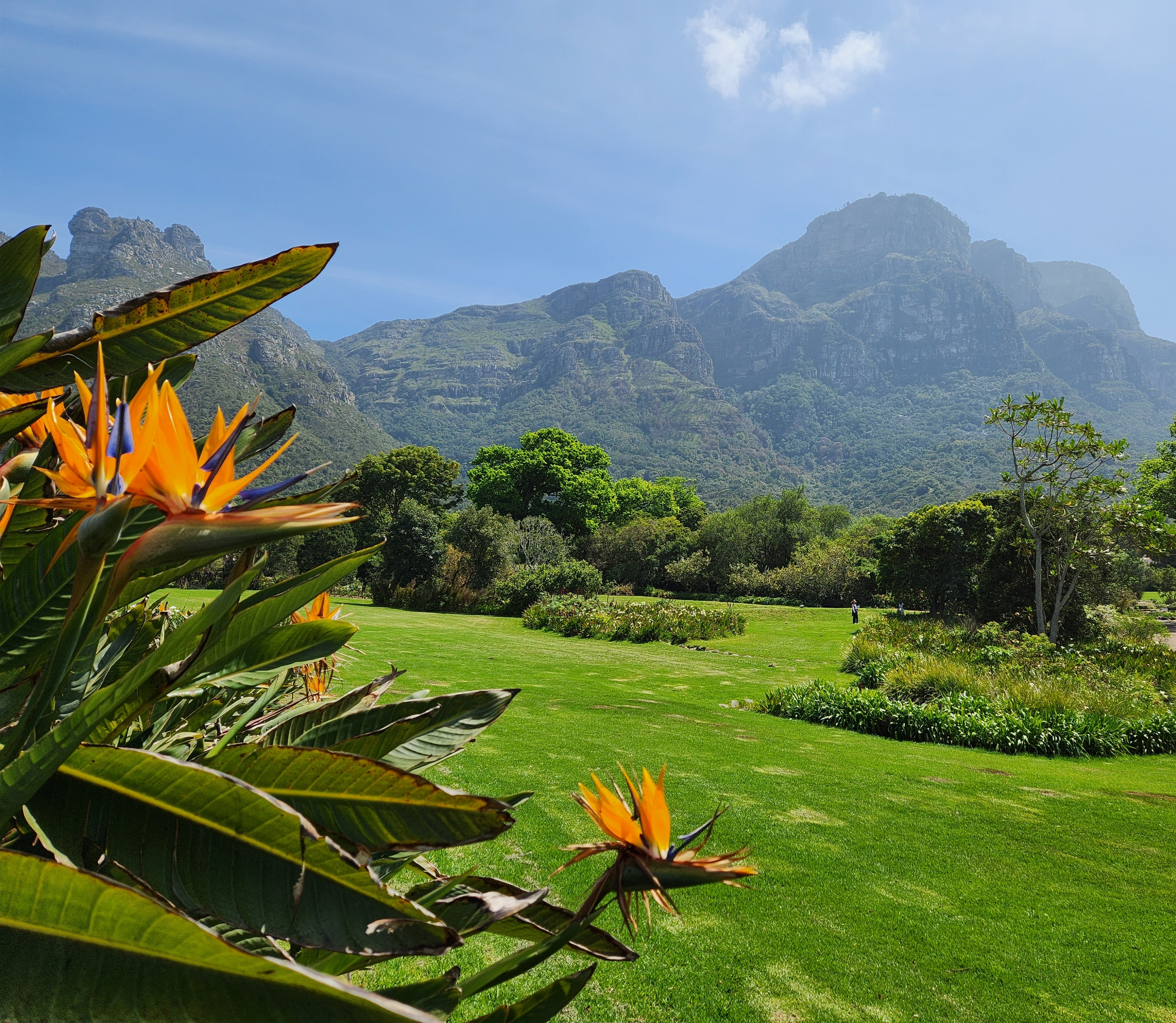
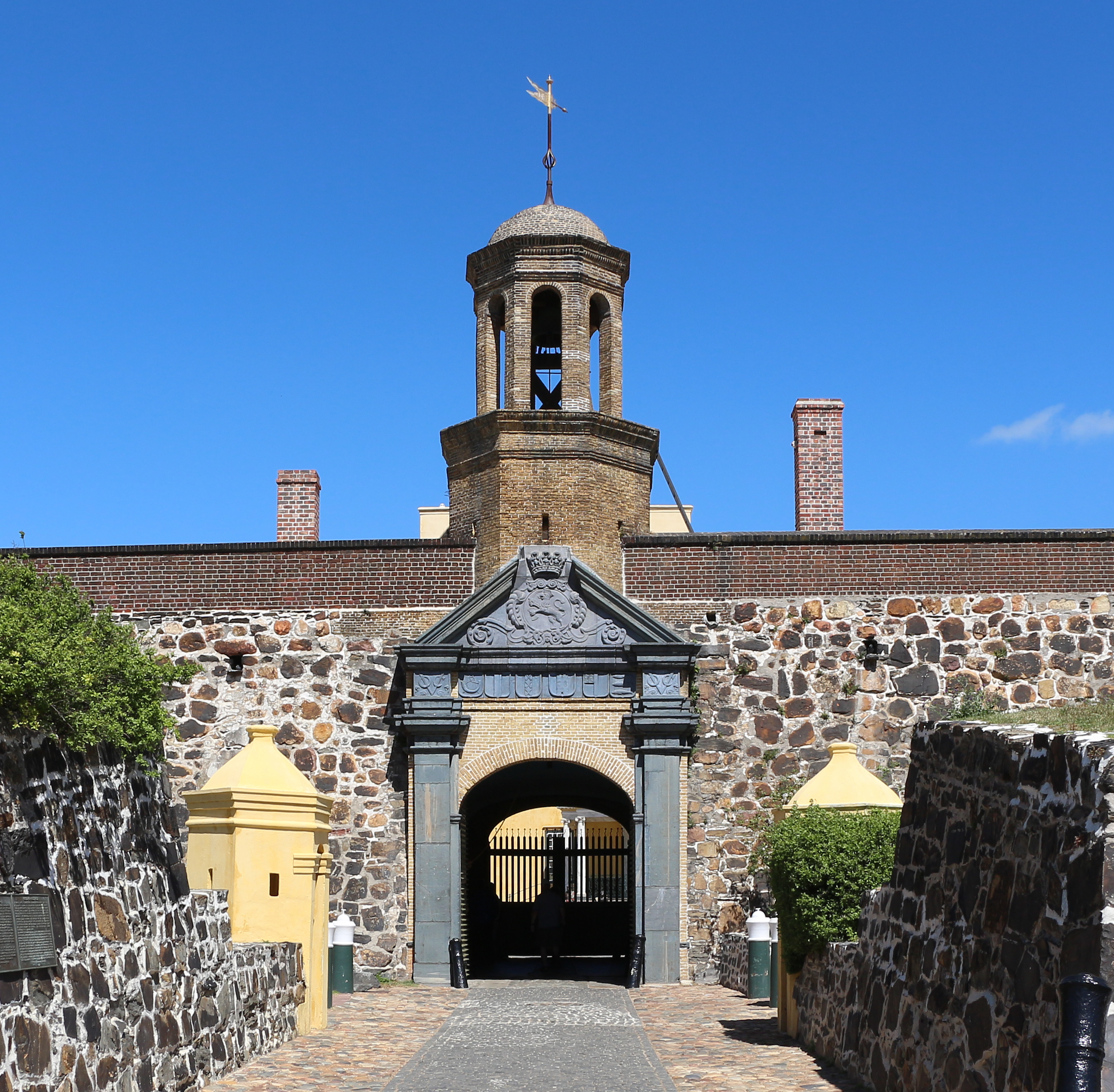
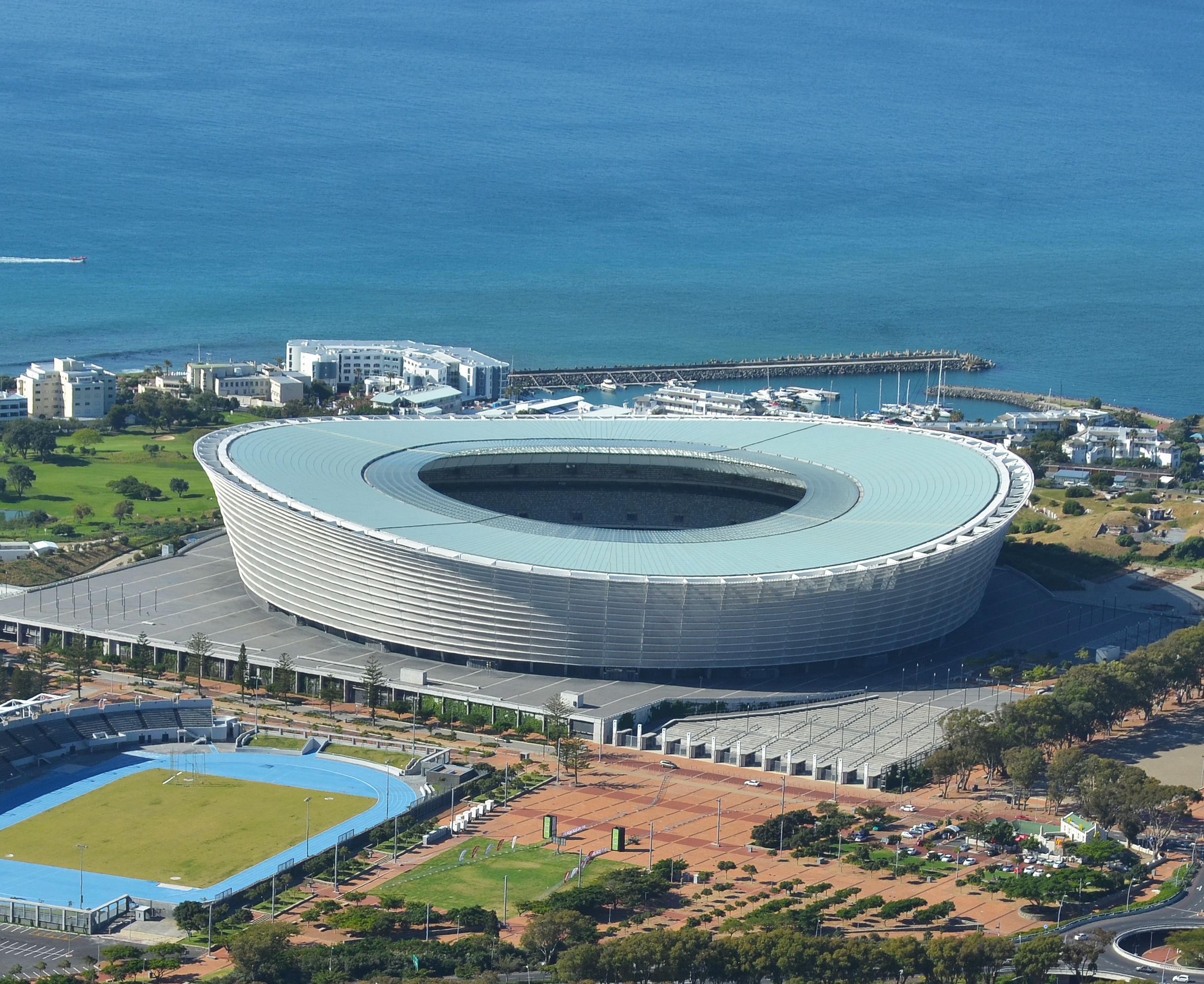
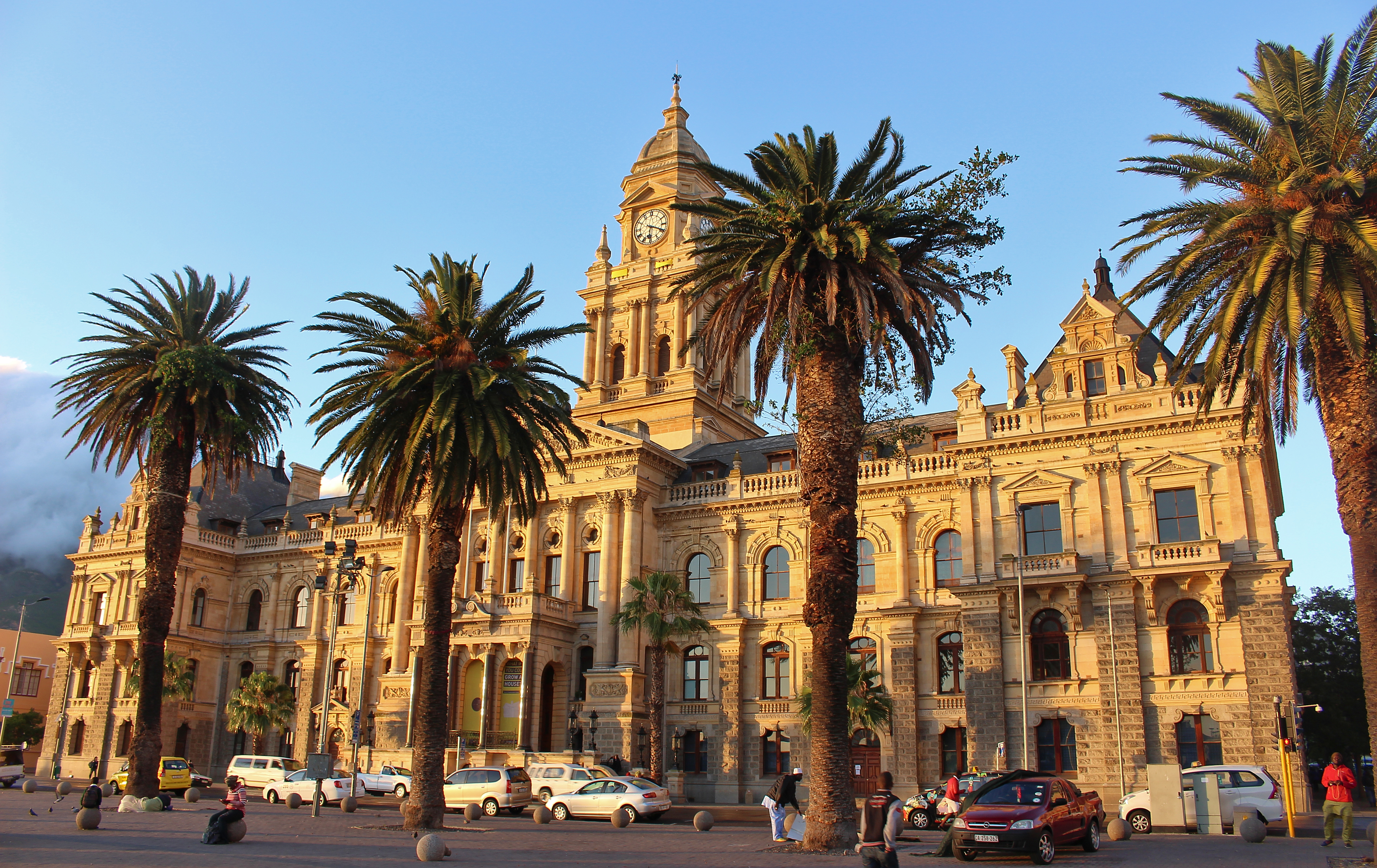
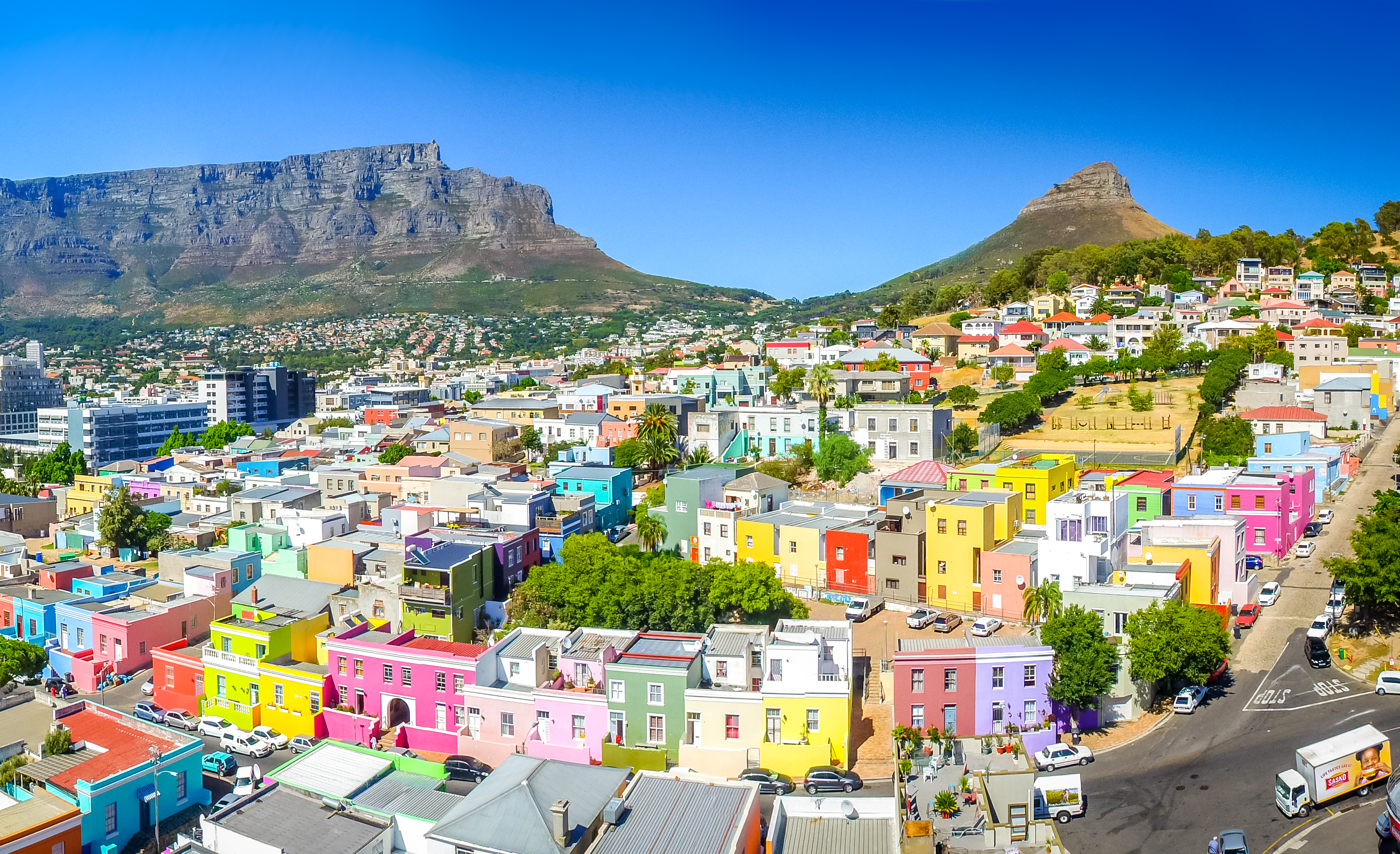
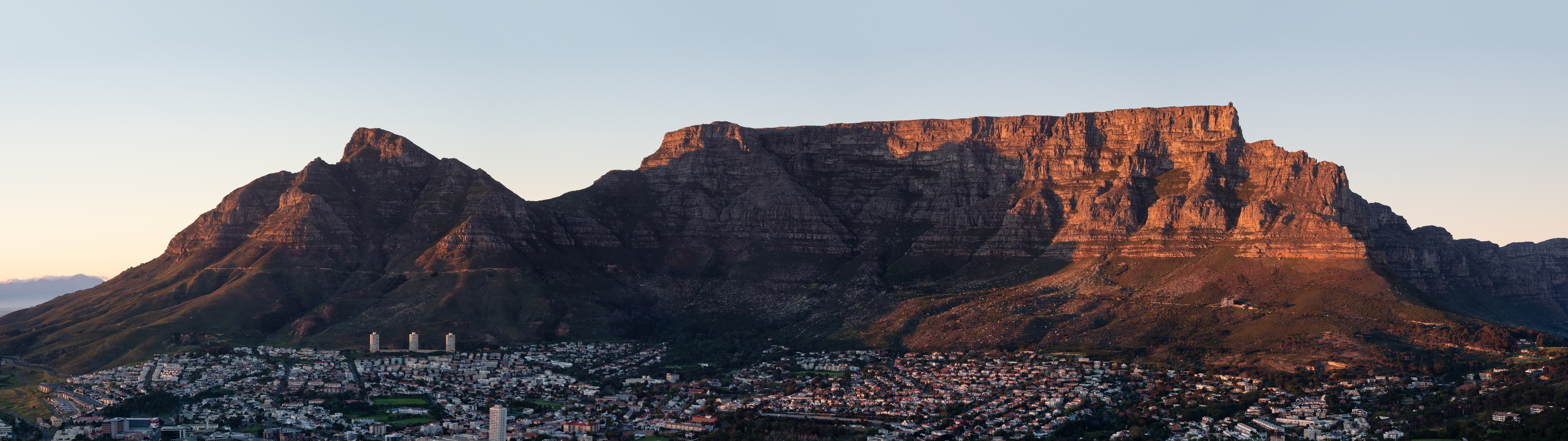
- Skyline of the Cape Town CBD Camps Bay Beach V&A Waterfront Kirstenbosch Garden Castle of Good Hope DHL Stadium Cape Town City Hall Bo-Kaap Devil's Peak and Table Mountain from Signal Hill

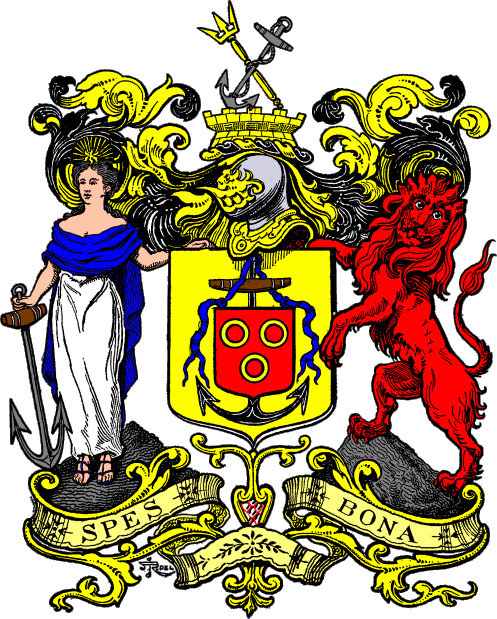
- Coat of arms Logo
- Nicknames: Mother City, Tavern of the Seas (archaic)
- Motto: Spes Bona (Latin for "Good Hope")
- Interactive map of Cape Town
- Location within Western Cape Location within South Africa Location within Africa
- Coordinates: 33°55′31″S 18°25′26″E
- Country: South Africa
- Province: Western Cape
- Municipality: City of Cape Town
- Founded: 6 April 1652; 374 years ago
- Municipal government: 1839; 187 years ago

Government
  - Type: Metropolitan municipality
  - Mayor: Geordin Hill-Lewis (DA)
  - Deputy Mayor: Eddie Andrews (DA)

Area
  - Capital city (legislative branch): 2,461 km^{2} (950 sq mi)
- Highest elevation: 1,590.4 m (5,218 ft)
- Lowest elevation: 0 m (0 ft)

Population
  - Rank: 13th in Africa; 2nd in South Africa
  - Urban (2011): 433,688
  - Urban density: 1,083/km^{2} (2,800/sq mi)
  - Metro (2022): 4,772,846
  - Metro density: 1,952/km^{2} (5,060/sq mi)
- Demonym: Capetonian

Racial makeup (2022)
  - Black African: 45.7%
  - Coloured: 35.0%
  - Indian/Asian: 1.6%
  - White: 16.2%
  - Other: 1.5%

First languages (2011)
  - Afrikaans: 35.7%
  - Xhosa: 29.2%
  - English: 27.8%
  - Other languages: 7.3% (Note: It is estimated that at least 90% of Capetonians can speak English, even though less than 30% speak it as their native language.)
- Time zone: UTC+2 (SAST)
- Postal codes (street): 7400–8099
- PO box: 7000
- HDI: 0.82 – very high
- GMP (2020): US$121 billion
- GMP per capita (2011): US$19,656
- Website: capetown.gov.za

Cape Town (Note: Afrikaans: Kaapstad [ˈkɑːpstat]; Xhosa: iKapa [íkáːpa]; Khoekhoe: ǁHui!gaeb, lit. 'the place where the clouds meet'; also known as "the Mother City".) is the legislative capital of South Africa. It is the country's oldest city and the seat of the Parliament of South Africa. Cape Town is the capital and largest city of the Western Cape, and the country's second-most populous city, after Johannesburg. The city is part of the City of Cape Town metropolitan municipality.

The city is known for its harbour, its natural setting in the Cape Floristic Region, and for landmarks such as Table Mountain and Cape Point. Located on the shore of Table Bay, the City Bowl area of Cape Town, which contains its central business district (CBD), is the oldest urban area in the Western Cape, with a significant cultural heritage. The metropolitan area has a long coastline on the Atlantic Ocean, which includes a northern section in the West Beach region, as well as the False Bay area in the south.

The Table Mountain National Park is within the city boundaries and there are several other nature reserves and marine-protected areas within and adjacent to the city. These include Kirstenbosch National Botanical Garden, which contains 5 of South Africa's 6 biomes, and displays many plants native to the Cape region.

A major international tourist destination, Cape Town has been named the best city in the world, and the world's best city for travellers numerous times, including by The New York Times in 2014, Time Out in 2025, the World Travel Awards in 2026, and The Telegraph for the past 8 years (2017 through 2025). Cape Town has South Africa's highest household incomes, lowest rate of unemployment, highest level of infrastructure investment, strongest service delivery performance, largest tourism appeal, and most robust real estate market.

== History ==
External videos
- "Khoisan group renames the cape"— 2012 news report by Eyewitness News on the official Khoekhoe naming of Cape Town as "ǁHuiǃgaeb" and how it is pronounced

=== Early period ===
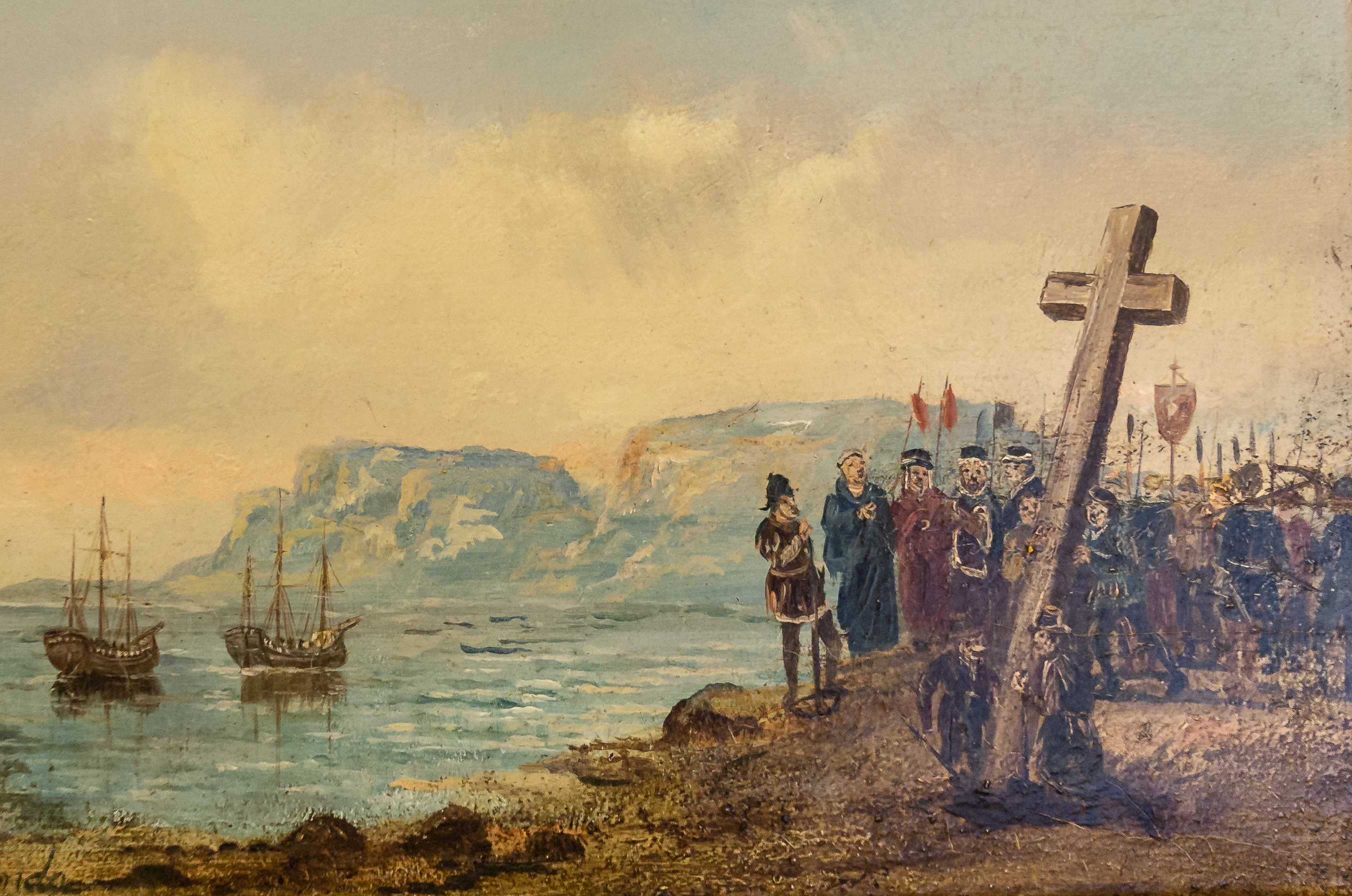
Portuguese explorer Bartolomeu Dias planting a Padrão at Cape Point, 1488

The earliest known remnants of human occupation in the region were found at Peers Cave in Fish Hoek in the late 1920s. Subject to much debate, earlier estimations as to an upper Pleistocene origin have since been revised. At their most generous and conservative estimates, D. D. Stynder et al. radiocarbon date SAM-AP 4692 to the mid-Holocene at 5448 and 5136 BCE (or 7457 and 7145 cal BP) respectively.

Bartolomeu Dias, the first European to reach the area, arrived in 1488 and named it "Cape of Storms" (Cabo das Tormentas). It was later renamed by John II of Portugal as "Cape of Good Hope" (Cabo da Boa Esperança) because of the great optimism engendered by the opening of a sea route to the Indian subcontinent and East Indies. In 1497, Portuguese explorer Vasco da Gama recorded a sighting of the Cape of Good Hope.

In 1510, at the Battle of Salt River, the Portuguese admiral Francisco de Almeida and sixty-four of his men were killed and his party was defeated by the "Goringhaiqua" (in Dutch approximate spelling) using cattle that were specially trained to respond to whistles and shouts.

The Gorinaiqua were one of the Khoikhoi clans who inhabited the area. In the late 16th century French, Danish, Dutch, and English, but mainly Portuguese, ships regularly continued to stop over in Table Bay en route to the Indies. They traded tobacco, copper, and iron with the Khoikhoi clans of the region in exchange for fresh meat and other essential traveling provisions.

=== Dutch period ===
Dutch period

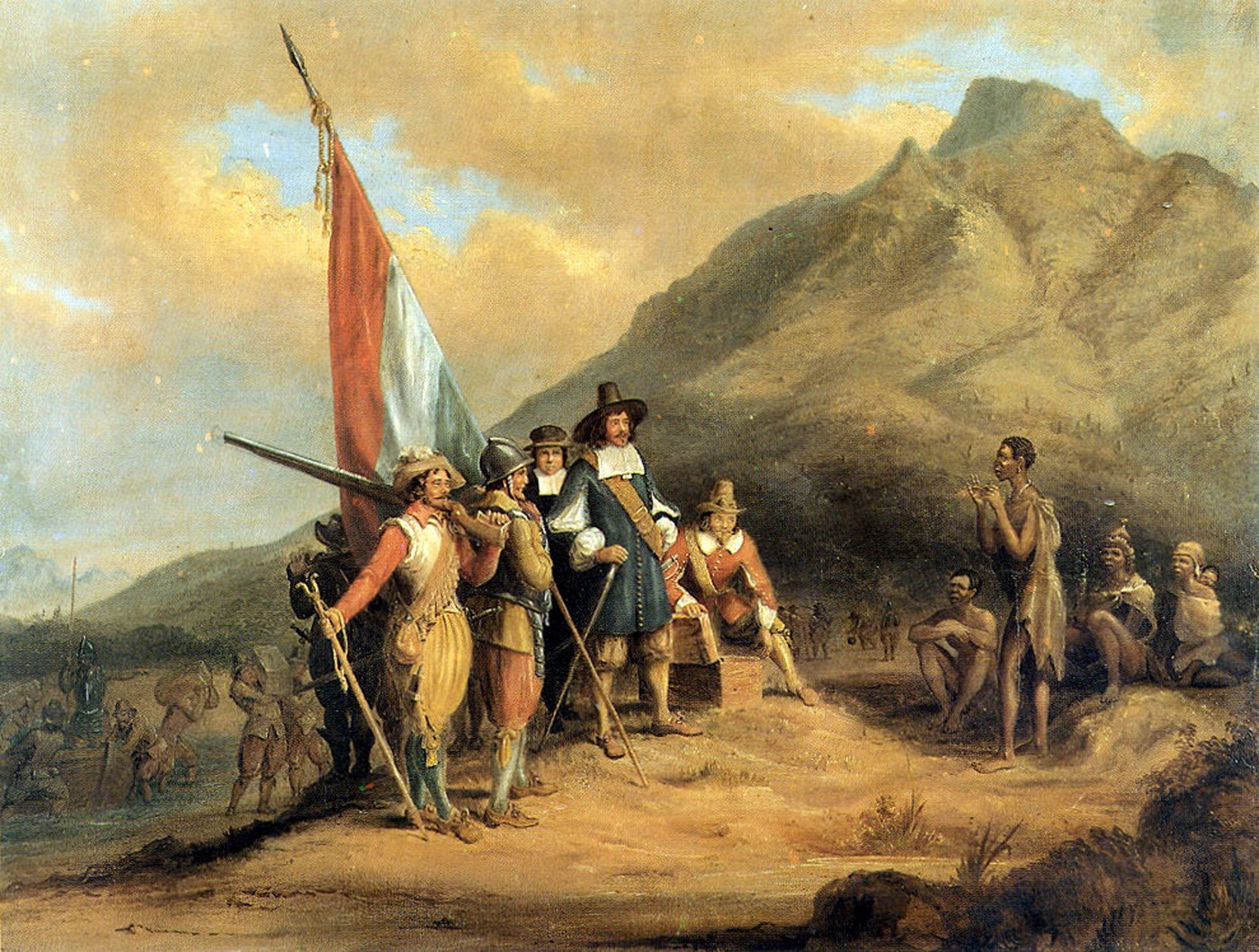
Jan van Riebeeck and Dutch colonists arriving in Table Bay in 1652

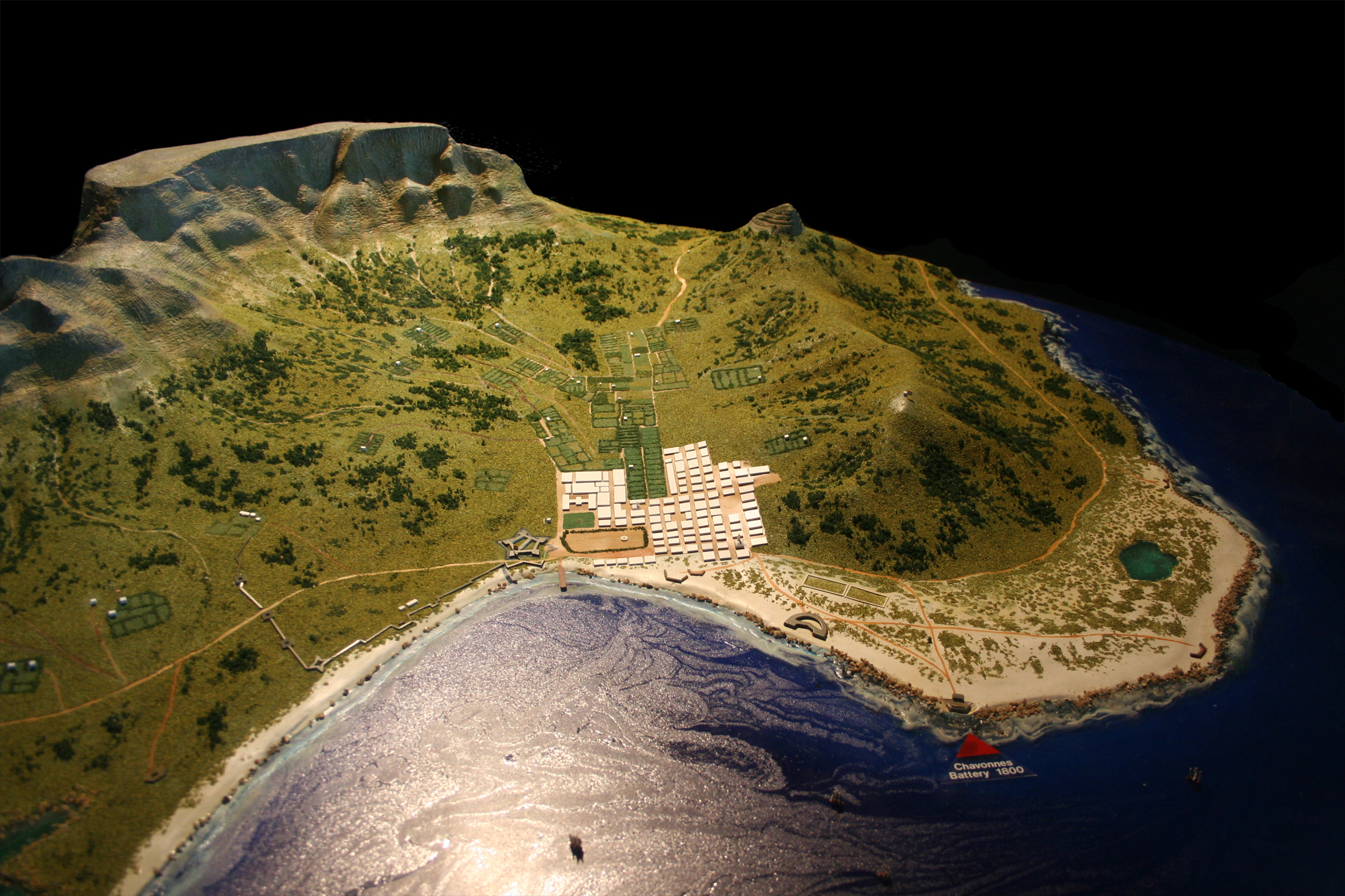
A diorama of Cape Town as it would have appeared in 1800 at the end of Dutch rule by the VOC

In 1652, Jan van Riebeeck and other employees of the United East India Company (Dutch: Verenigde Oost-indische Compagnie, VOC) were sent to the Cape Colony to establish a way-station for ships travelling to the Dutch East Indies, and the Fort de Goede Hoop (later replaced by the Castle of Good Hope).

The settlement grew slowly during this period, as it was hard to find adequate labour. This labour shortage prompted the local authorities to import enslaved people from Indonesia and Madagascar. Many of these people are ancestors of modern-day Cape Coloured and Cape Malay communities.

Under Van Riebeeck and his successors, as VOC commanders and later governors at the Cape, a wide range of agricultural plants were introduced to the Cape. Some of these, including grapes, cereals, ground nuts, potatoes, apples and citrus, had a large and lasting influence on the societies and economies of the region.

=== British period ===
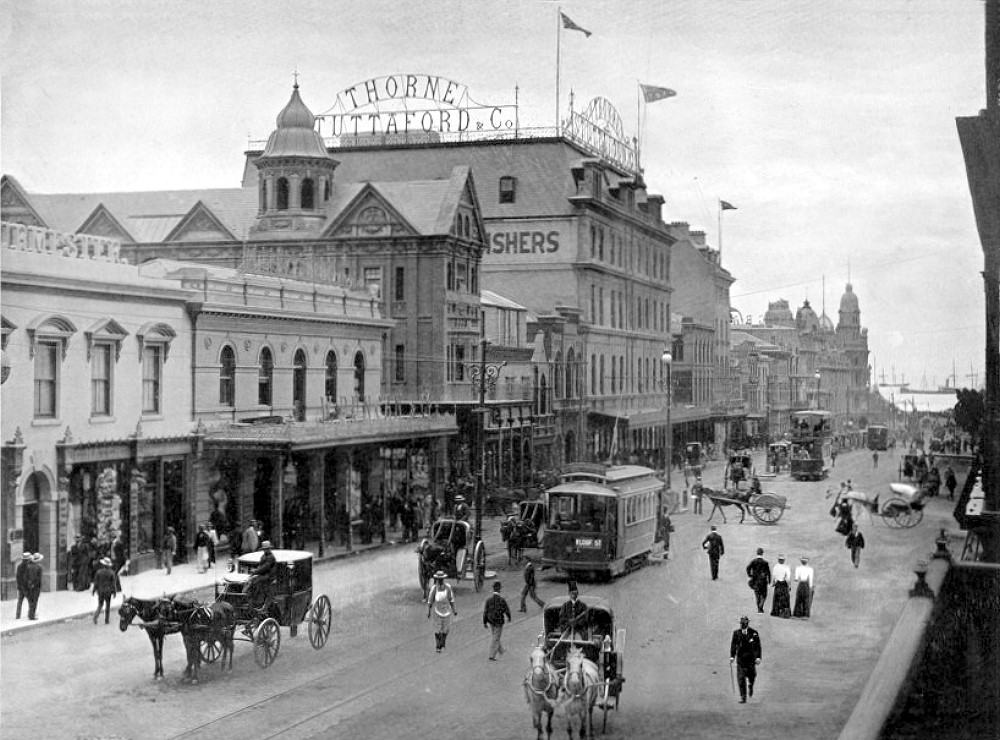
Adderley Street in 1897 was an important commercial hub in Cape Town at a time when the city was the most important centre of economic activity in the Southern Africa region.

With the Dutch Republic being transformed into Revolutionary France's vassal Batavian Republic, Great Britain moved to take control of Dutch colonies, including the colonial possessions of the VOC.

Britain captured Cape Town in 1795, but it was returned to the Dutch by treaty in 1803. British forces occupied the Cape again in 1806 following the Battle of Blaauwberg when the Batavian Republic allied with Britain's rival, France, during the Napoleonic Wars. Following the conclusion of the war Cape Town was permanently ceded to the United Kingdom in the Anglo-Dutch Treaty of 1814.

The city became the capital of the newly formed Cape Colony, whose territory expanded very substantially through the 1800s, partially as a result of numerous wars with the amaXhosa on the colony's eastern frontier. In 1833 slavery was abolished in the colony freeing over 5500 slaves in the city, almost a third of the city's population at the time. The Convict Crisis of 1849, marked by substantial civil upheaval, bolstered the push for self-governance in the Cape.

With expansion came calls for greater independence from the UK, with the Cape attaining its own parliament (1854) and a locally accountable prime minister (1872). Suffrage was established according to the non-racial Cape Qualified Franchise.

During the 1850s and 1860s, additional plant species were introduced from Australia by the British authorities. Notably rooikrans was introduced to stabilise the sand of the Cape Flats to allow for a road connecting the peninsula with the rest of the African continent and eucalyptus was used to drain marshes.

In 1859 the first railway line was built by the Cape Government Railways and a system of railways rapidly expanded in the 1870s. The discovery of diamonds in Griqualand West in 1867, and the Witwatersrand Gold Rush in 1886, prompted a flood of immigration into South Africa. In 1895 the city's first public power station, the Graaff Electric Lighting Works, was opened.

Conflicts between the Boer republics in the interior and the British colonial government resulted in the Second Boer War of 1899–1902. Britain's victory in this war led to the formation of a united South Africa. From 1891 to 1901, the city's population more than doubled from 67,000 to 171,000.

As the 19th century came to an end, the economic and political dominance of Cape Town in the Southern Africa region during the 19th century started to give way to the dominance of Johannesburg and Pretoria in the 20th century.

=== South African period ===
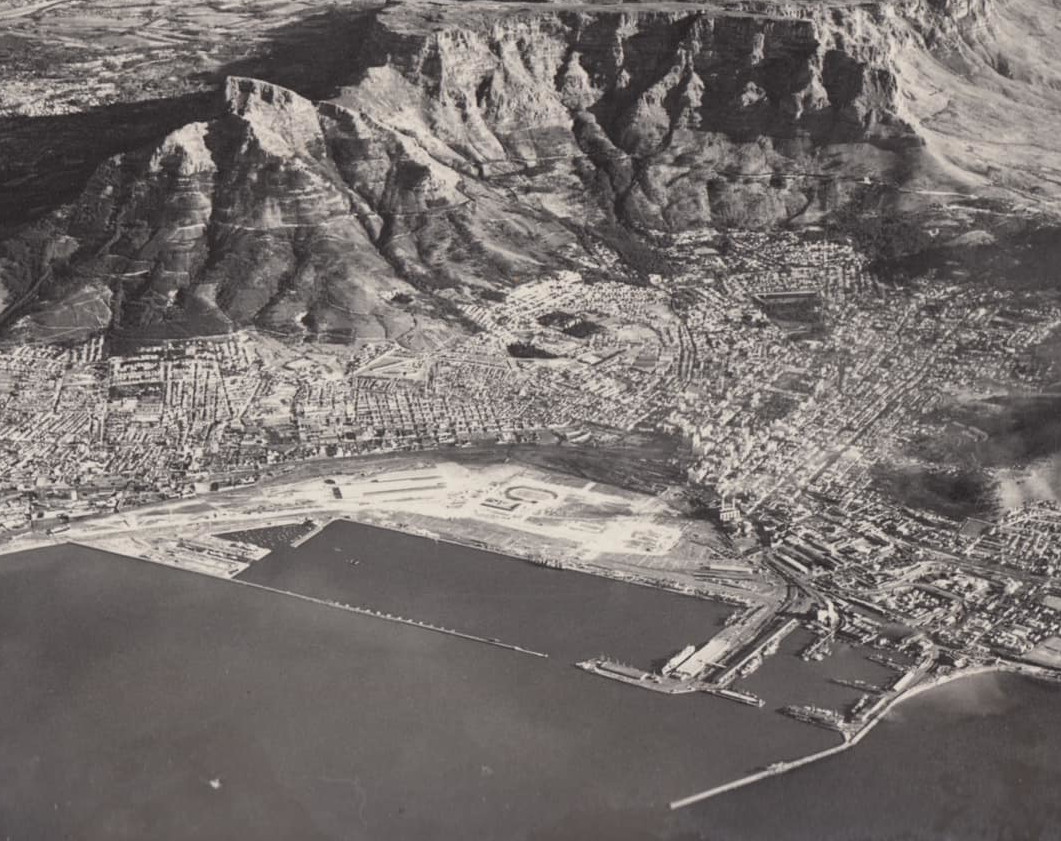
An aerial photograph of the newly completed Cape Town foreshore in 1945. Visible in this photograph as the large area of empty land between the City Centre and the newly constructed harbour out of reclaimed land from Table Bay.

In 1910 Britain established the Union of South Africa which unified the Cape Colony with the two defeated Boer Republics and the British colony of Natal. Cape Town became the legislative capital of the Union, and later of the Republic of South Africa.

By the time of the 1936 census, Johannesburg had overtaken Cape Town as the largest city in the country.

In 1945 the expansion of the Cape Town foreshore was completed, adding an additional 194 ha (480 acres) to the Cape Town CBD, and by extension, the City Bowl region.

==== Apartheid era ====
Prior to the mid-twentieth century Cape Town was one of the most racially integrated cities in South Africa. In the 1948 national elections the National Party won on a platform of apartheid (racial segregation) under the slogan of "swart gevaar" (Afrikaans for "black danger"). This led to the erosion and eventual abolition of the Cape's multiracial franchise.

In 1950 the apartheid government first introduced the Group Areas Act, which classified and segregated urban areas according to race. Formerly multi-racial suburbs of Cape Town were either purged of residents deemed unlawful by apartheid legislation, or demolished. The most infamous example of this in Cape Town was the suburb of District Six. After it was declared a whites-only area in 1965, all housing there was demolished and over 60,000 residents were forcibly removed. Many of these residents were relocated to the Cape Flats.

The earliest of the Cape Flats forced removals saw the expulsion of Black South Africans to Langa, Cape Town's first and oldest township, in line with the 1923 Native Urban Areas Act.

Under apartheid the Cape was considered a "Coloured labour preference area", to the exclusion of "Bantus", i.e. Black Africans. The implementation of this policy was widely opposed by trade unions, civil society and opposition parties. It is notable that this policy was not advocated for by any Coloured political group, and its implementation was a unilateral decision by the apartheid government.

During the student-led Soweto Uprising of June 1976, school students from Langa, Gugulethu and Nyanga in Cape Town reacted to the news of the protests against Bantu Education by organising gatherings and marches of their own. A number of school buildings were burnt down and the protest action was met with forceful resistance from the police.

Cape Town has been home to many leaders of the anti-apartheid movement. In Table Bay, 10 km (6 mi) from the city is Robben Island. This penitentiary island was the site of a maximum security prison where many famous apartheid-era political prisoners served long prison sentences. Famous prisoners include activist, lawyer and future president Nelson Mandela who served 18 of his 27 years of imprisonment on the island, as well as two other future presidents, Kgalema Motlanthe and Jacob Zuma.

In one of the most famous moments marking the end of apartheid, Nelson Mandela made his first public speech since his imprisonment from the balcony of Cape Town City Hall, hours after being released on 11 February 1990. His speech heralded the beginning of a new era for the country. The first democratic election was held four years later on 27 April 1994.

Nobel Square in the Victoria & Alfred Waterfront features statues of South Africa's four Nobel Peace Prize winners: Albert Luthuli, Desmond Tutu, F. W. de Klerk and Nelson Mandela.

==== Post-apartheid era ====
Cape Town has undergone significant changes in the years since Apartheid. Cape Town has experienced economic growth and development in the post-apartheid era. The city has become a major economic hub in South Africa, attracting international investment and tourism. The Democratic Alliance (DA), a liberal political party which came to power in Cape Town in 2006, has been credited with improving bureaucratic efficiency, public safety and fostering economic development.

Opinion polls show that South Africans view the Western Cape as the best governed province, Cape Town as the best governed city in the country. Of South Africa's 257 municipalities, only 38 received a clean financial audit in 2022 from the Auditor-General. Of those, 21 were in the Western Cape.

The city's economy has diversified, with growth in sectors such as technology, finance, real estate, and tourism. The establishment of the Cape Town CCID has been particularly successful in revitalizing the city center, bringing businesses and people back into the area. This initiative has transformed public spaces such as Greenmarket Square, Company's Garden, and St George's Mall, attracting both locals and tourists.

In 2014 Cape Town was named World Design Capital of the Year. Cape Town was voted the best tourist destination in Africa at the 2023 World Travel Awards in Dubai and continues to be the most important tourist destination in the country. Cape Town has been named the best travel city in the world every year since 2013 in the Telegraph Travel Awards.

Rapid urbanization driven by migration from the Northern and Eastern Cape, along with the legacy of apartheid's spatial planning, have caused significant disparities between affluent areas and impoverished townships. 60% of the city's population live in townships and informal settlements far from the city centre. The legacy of Apartheid means Cape Town remains one of the most racially segregated cities in South Africa. Many Black South Africans continue to live in informal settlements with limited access to basic services such as healthcare, education, and sanitation.

The unemployment rate in Cape Town remains high at 23% as of 2024 (though nearly 10 points lower than the nationwide average), particularly among historically disadvantaged groups, and economic opportunities are unevenly distributed.

Cape Town faced a severe water shortage from 2015 to 2018. According to Oxfam, "in the face of an imminent water shortage, the city of Cape Town in South Africa successfully reduced its water use by more than half in three years, cutting it from 1.2bn litres per day in February 2015 to 516m litres per day in 2018."

In 2021 Cape Town also experienced a violent turf war between rival mini-bus taxi firms which led to the deaths of 83 people. Two years later a strike by the mini-bus taxi firms resulted in 5 deaths.

Since the 2010s, Cape Town and the wider Western Cape province have seen the rise of a small secessionist movement. Support for parties "which have formally adopted Cape independence" was around 5% in the 2021 municipal elections.

== Geography and the natural environment ==
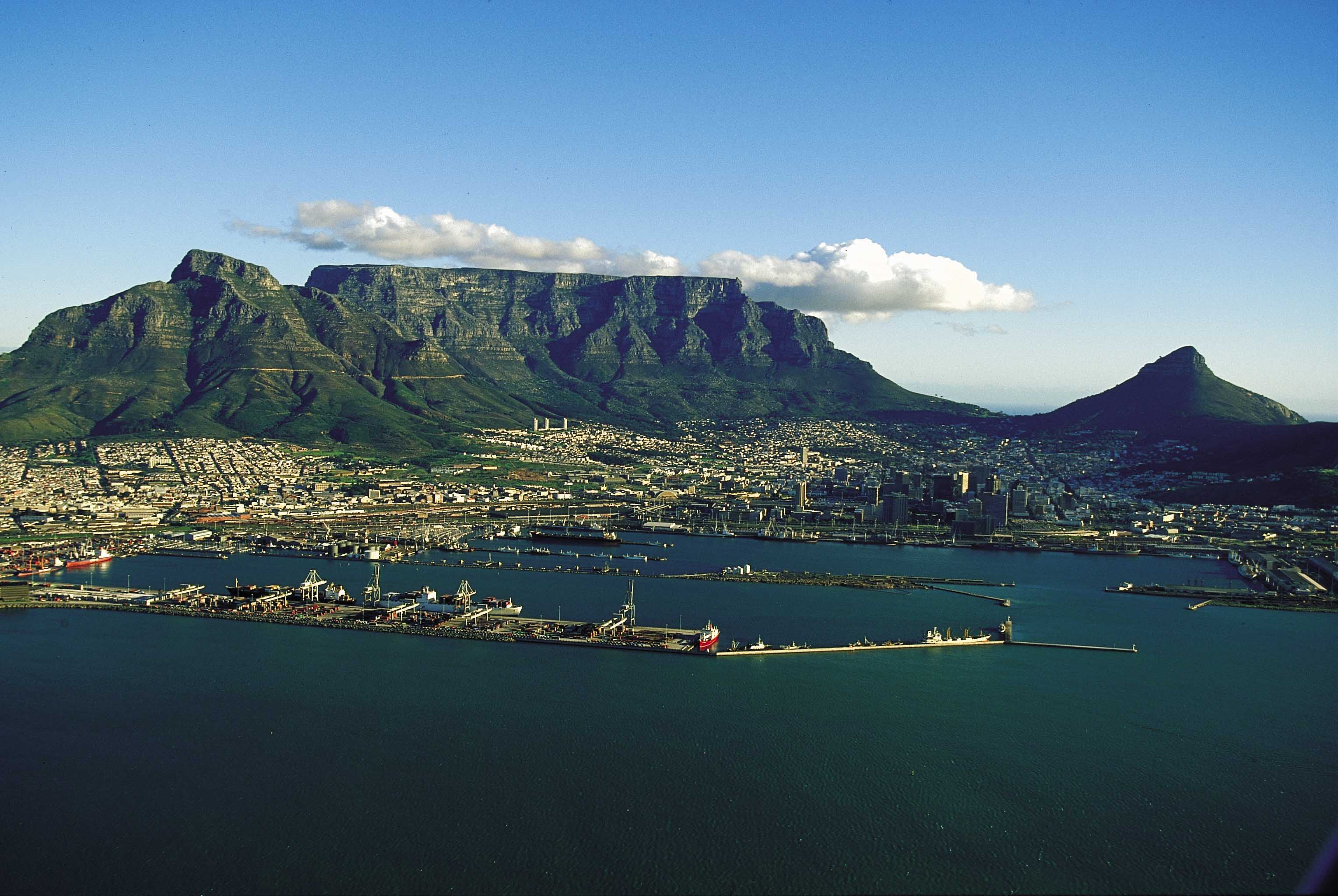
Devil's Peak, Table Mountain and Lion's Head

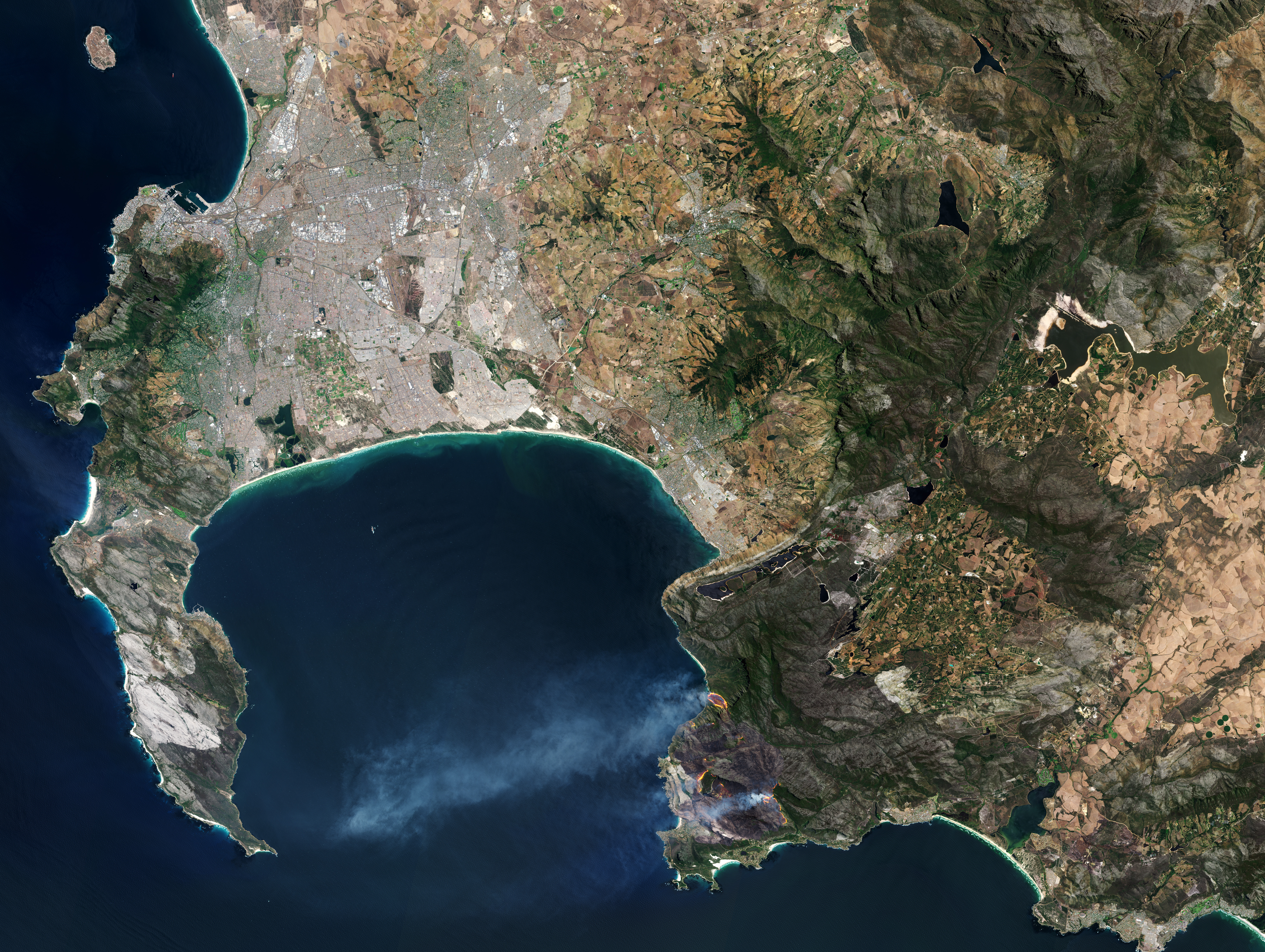
Satellite image of Cape Town showing the Cape Peninsula (left), Cape Flats and False Bay

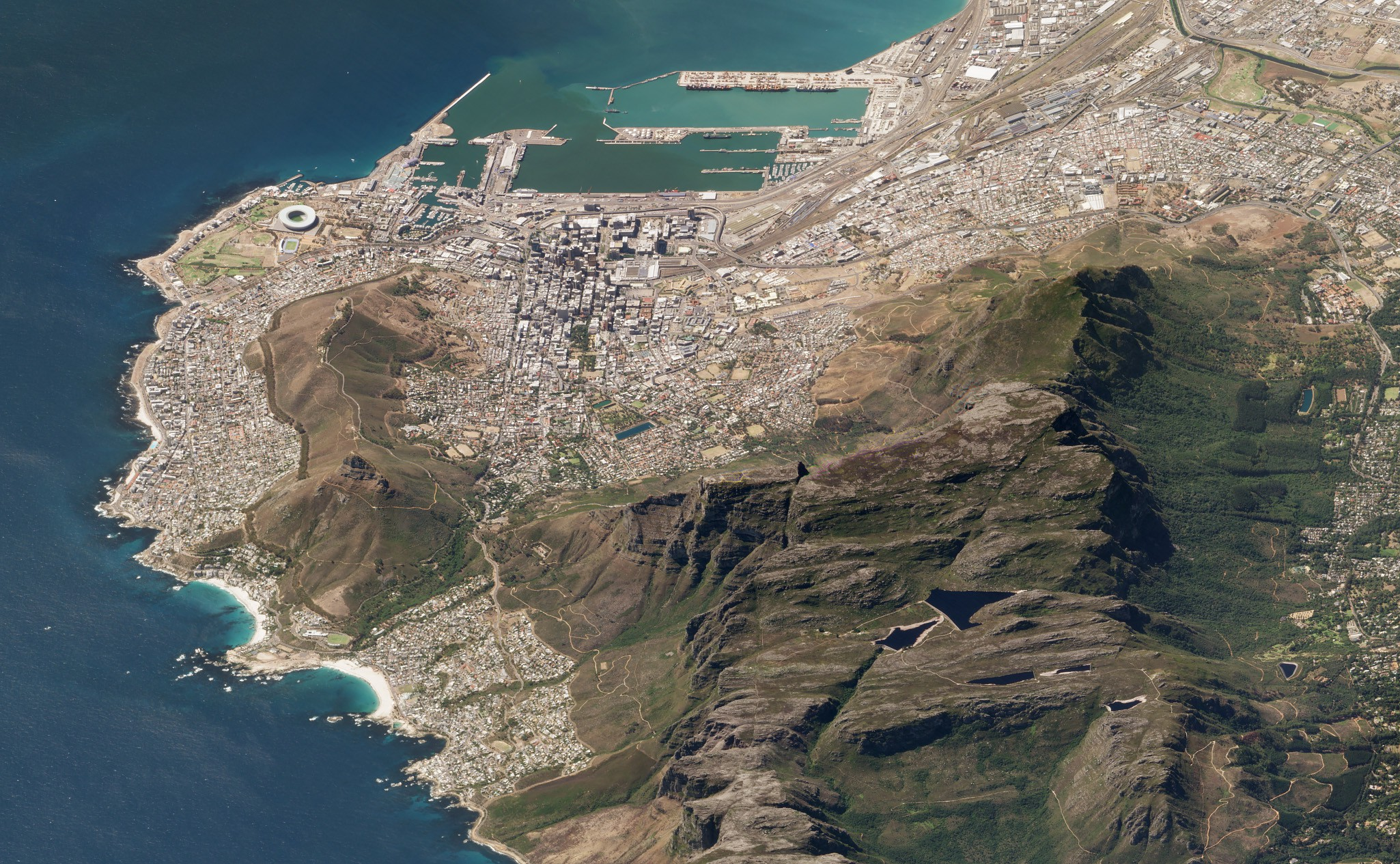
3D satellite image of the City Bowl, containing Cape Town CBD, and Table Mountain

Cape Town is located at latitude 33.55° S (approximately the same as Sydney and Buenos Aires and equivalent to Casablanca and Los Angeles in the northern hemisphere) and longitude 18.25° E.

Table Mountain, with its near vertical cliffs and flat-topped summit over 1,000 m (3,300 ft) high, and with Devil's Peak and Lion's Head on either side, together form a dramatic mountainous backdrop, which creates the City Bowl. This area comprises the Cape Town CBD as well as numerous suburbs on the mountainside.

A thin strip of cloud, known colloquially as the "tablecloth" ("Karos" in Afrikaans), sometimes forms on top of the mountain. To the immediate south of the city, the Cape Peninsula is a scenic mountainous spine jutting 40 km (25 mi) southward into the Atlantic Ocean and terminating at Cape Point.

There are over 70 peaks above 300 m (980 ft) within Cape Town's official metropolitan limits. Many of the city's suburbs lie on the large plain called the Cape Flats, which extends over 50 km (30 mi) to the east and joins the peninsula to the mainland. The Cape Town region is characterised by an extensive coastline, rugged mountain ranges, coastal plains and inland valleys.

=== Extent ===
The extent of Cape Town has varied considerably over time. It originated as a small settlement at the foot of Table Mountain and has grown beyond its city limits as a metropolitan area to encompass the entire Cape Peninsula to the south, the Cape Flats, the Helderberg basin and part of the Steenbras catchment area to the east, and the Tygerberg hills, Blouberg and other areas to the north. Robben Island in Table Bay is also part of Cape Town. It is bounded by the Atlantic Ocean to the west, and False Bay to the south. To the north and east, the extent is demarcated by boundaries of neighbouring municipalities within the Western Cape province.

The official boundaries of the city proper extend between the City Bowl and the Atlantic Seaboard to the east and the Southern Suburbs to the south. The City of Cape Town, the metropolitan municipality that takes its name from the city covers the Greater Cape Town metropolitan area, known as the Cape Metropole, extending beyond the city proper itself to include a number of satellite towns, suburbs and rural areas such as Atlantis, Bellville, Blouberg, Brackenfell, Durbanville, Goodwood, Gordon's Bay, Hout Bay, Khayelitsha, Kraaifontein, Kuilsrivier, Macassar, Melkbosstrand, Milnerton, Muizenberg, Noordhoek, Parow, Philadelphia, Simon's Town, Somerset West, and Strand among others.

The Cape Peninsula is 52 km (32 mi) long from Mouille Point in the north to Cape Point in the south, with an area of about 470 km^{2} (180 sq mi), and it displays more topographical variety than other similar sized areas in southern Africa, and consequently spectacular scenery. There are diverse low-nutrient soils, large rocky outcrops, scree slopes, a mainly rocky coastline with embayed beaches, and considerable local variation in climatic conditions.

The sedimentary rocks of the Cape Supergroup, of which parts of the Graafwater and Peninsula Formations remain, were uplifted between 280 and 21S million years ago, and were largely eroded away during the Mesozoic. The region was geologically stable during the Tertiary, which has led to slow denudation of the durable sandstones. Erosion rate and drainage has been influenced by fault lines and fractures, leaving remnant steep-sided massifs like Table Mountain surrounded by flatter slopes of deposits of the eroded material overlaying the older rocks,

There are two internationally notable landmarks, Table Mountain and Cape Point, at opposite ends of the Peninsula Mountain Chain, with the Cape Flats and False Bay to the east and the Atlantic Ocean to the west. The landscape is dominated by sandstone plateaux and ridges, which generally drop steeply at their margins to the surrounding debris slopes, interrupted by a major gap at the Fish Hoek–Noordhoek valley.

In the south much of the area is a low sandstone plateau with sand dunes. Maximum altitude is 1,113 metres (3,652 ft) on Table Mountain. The Cape Flats (Afrikaans: Kaapse Vlakte) is a flat, low-lying, sandy area, area to the east the Cape Peninsula, and west of the Helderberg much of which was wetland and dunes within recent history. To the north are the Tygerberg Hills and the Stellenbosch district.

The Helderberg area of Greater Cape Town, previously known as the "Hottentots-Holland" area, is mostly residential, but also a wine-producing area east of the Cape Flats, west of the Hottentots Holland mountain range and south of the Helderberg mountain, from which it gets its current name. The Helderberg consists of the previous municipalities of Somerset West, Strand, Gordons Bay and a few other towns. Industry and commerce is largely in service of the area.

After the Cape Peninsula, Helderberg is the next most mountainous part of Greater Cape Town, bordered to the north and east by the highest peaks in the region along the watershed of the Helderberg and Hottentots Holland Mountains, which are part of the Cape Fold Belt with Cape Supergroup strata on a basement of Tygerberg Formation rocks intruded by part of the Stellenbosch granite pluton.

The region includes the entire catchment of the Lourens and Sir Lowry's rivers, separated by the Schapenberg hill, and a small part of the catchment of the Eerste River to the west. The Helderberg is ecologically highly diverse, rivaling the Cape Peninsula, and has its own endemic ecoregions and several conservation areas.

To the east of the Hottentots Holland mountains is the valley of the Steenbras River, in which the Steenbras Dam was built as a water supply for Cape Town. The dam has been supplemented by several other dams around the western Cape, some of them considerably larger. This is almost entirely a conservation area, of high biodiversity. Bellville, Brackenfell, Durbanville, Kraaifontein, Goodwood and Parow are a few of the towns that make up the Northern Suburbs of Cape Town. In current popular culture these areas are often referred to as being beyond the "boerewors curtain," a play on the term "iron curtain."

UNESCO declared Robben Island in the Western Cape a World Heritage Site in 1999. Robben Island is located in Table Bay, some 6 km (3.7 mi) west of Bloubergstrand, a coastal suburb north of Cape Town, and stands some 30 metres (98 ft) above sea level. Robben Island has been used as a prison where people were isolated, banished, and exiled for nearly 400 years. It was also used as a leper colony, a post office, a grazing ground, a mental hospital, and an outpost.

The coastline of Cape Town is roughly 307 km long, from Silwerstroomstrand at 33°34′14.994″S 18°20′34.959″E on the west coast to slightly south of Kogelbaai at 34°16′10.554″S 18°50′44.905″E on the east coast of False Bay.

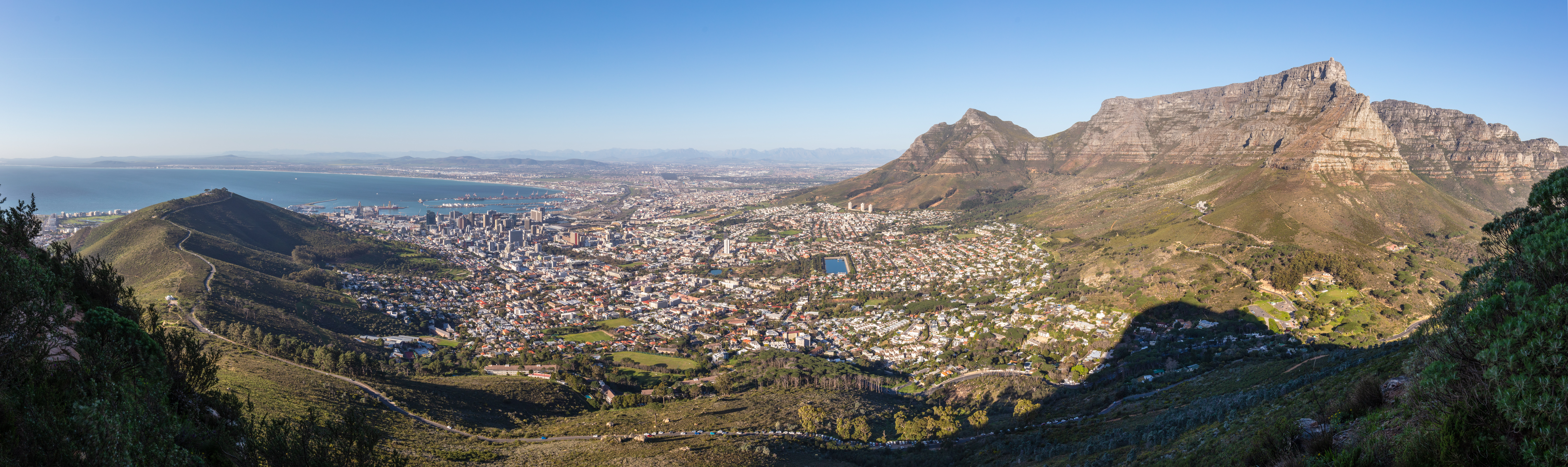
Cape Town's City Bowl and CBD viewed from Lion's Head in May (late autumn)
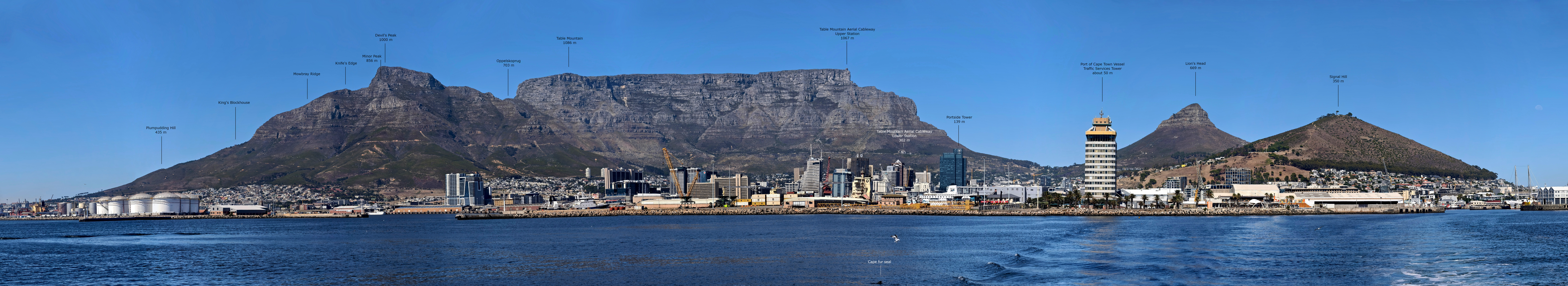
Cape Town with surrounding peaks

=== Geology ===
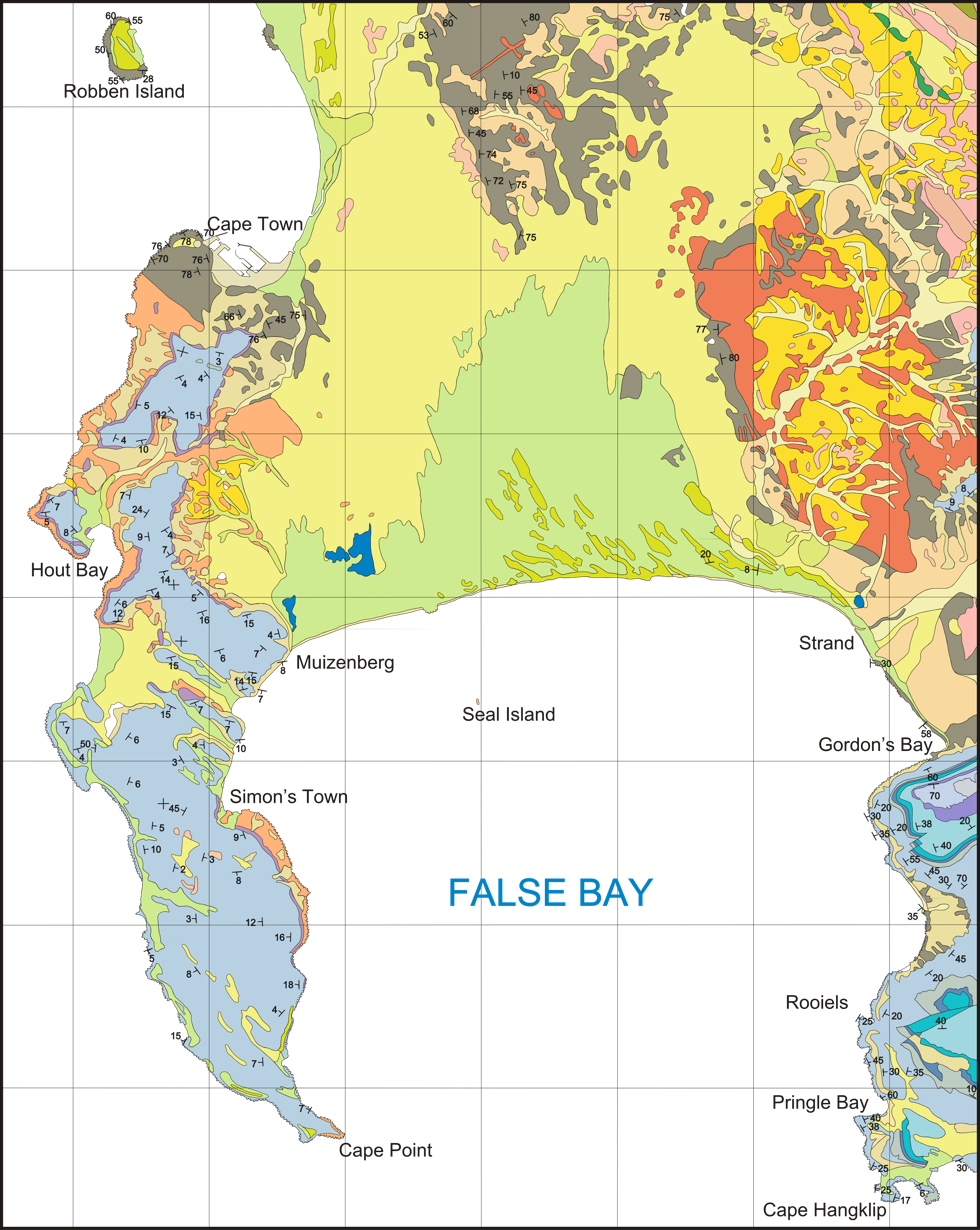
Geological map of the Cape Peninsula and False Bay

The Cape Peninsula is a rocky and mountainous peninsula that juts out into the Atlantic Ocean at the south-western extremity of the continent. At its tip is Cape Point and the Cape of Good Hope. The peninsula forms the west side of False Bay and the Cape Flats. On the east side are the Helderberg and Hottentots Holland mountains.

The three main rock formations are the late-Precambrian Malmesbury group (sedimentary and metamorphic rock), the Cape Granite suit, comprising the huge Peninsula, Kuilsrivier-Helderberg, and Stellenbosch batholiths, that were intruded into the Malmesbury Group about 630 million years ago, and the Table Mountain group sandstones that were deposited on the eroded surface of the granite and Malmesbury series basement about 450 million years ago.

The sand, silt and mud deposits were lithified by pressure and then folded during the Cape Orogeny to form the Cape Fold Belt, which extends in an arc along the western and southern coasts. The present landscape is due to prolonged erosion having carved out deep valleys, removing parts of the once continuous Table Mountain Group sandstone cover from over the Cape Flats and False Bay, and leaving high residual mountain ridges.

At times the sea covered the Cape Flats and Noordhoek valley and the Cape Peninsula was then a group of islands. During glacial periods the sea level dropped to expose the bottom of False Bay to weathering and erosion, with the last major regression leaving the entire bottom of False Bay exposed.

During this period an extensive system of dunes was formed on the sandy floor of False Bay. At this time the drainage outlets lay between Rocky Bank Cape Point to the west, and between Rocky Bank and Hangklip Ridge to the east, with the watershed roughly along the line of the contact zone east of Seal Island and Whittle Rock.

=== Climate ===
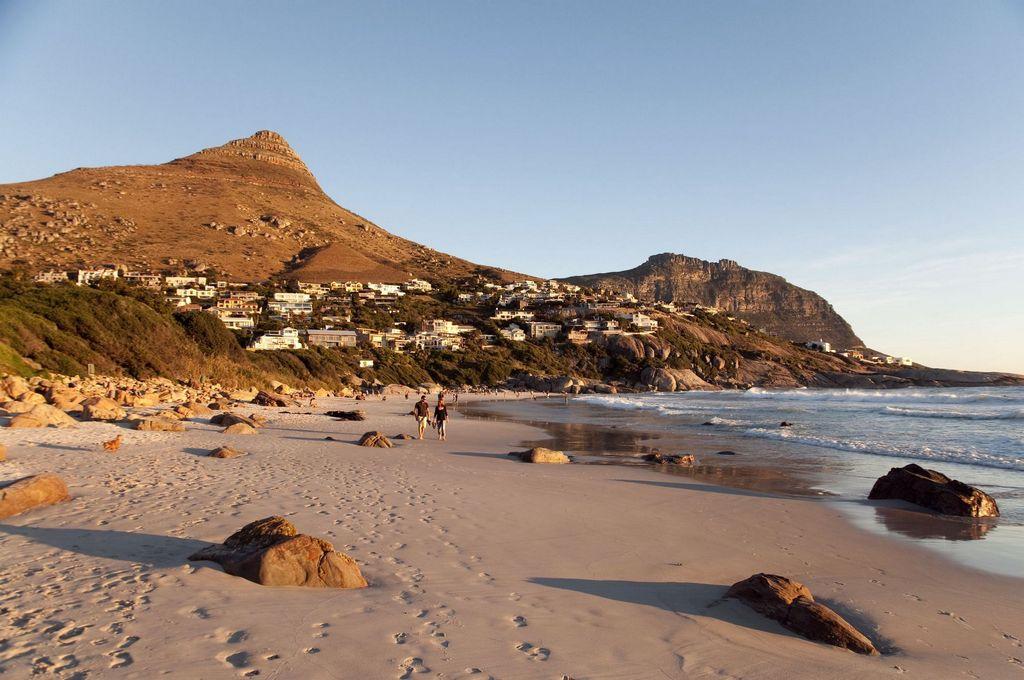
Llandudno, Western Cape during a sunny day

Cape Town has a hot-summer Mediterranean climate (Köppen: Csa), with mild, moderately wet winters and dry, hot summers. Winter, which lasts from June to September, may see large cold fronts entering for limited periods from the Atlantic Ocean with significant precipitation and strong north-westerly winds. Winter months in the city average a maximum of 18 °C (64 °F) and minimum of 8.5 °C (47 °F).

Winters are snow and frost free, except on Table Mountain and on other mountain peaks, where light accumulation of snow and frost can sometimes occur. Total annual rainfall in the city averages 515 mm (20.3 in) although in the Southern Suburbs, close to the mountains, rainfall is significantly higher and averages closer to 1,000 mm (39.4 in).

Summer, which lasts from December to March, is warm and dry with an average maximum of 26 °C (79 °F) and minimum of 16 °C (61 °F). The region can get uncomfortably hot when the Berg Wind, meaning "mountain wind", blows from the Karoo interior.

Spring and summer generally feature a strong wind from the south-east, known locally as the south-easter or the Cape Doctor, so called because it blows air pollution away. This wind is caused by a persistent high-pressure system over the South Atlantic to the west of Cape Town, known as the South Atlantic High, which shifts latitude seasonally, following the sun, and influencing the strength of the fronts and their northward reach. Cape Town receives about 3,100 hours of sunshine per year.

Water temperatures range greatly, between 10 °C (50 °F) on the Atlantic Seaboard, to over 22 °C (72 °F) in False Bay. Average annual ocean surface temperatures are between 13 °C (55 °F) on the Atlantic Seaboard (similar to Californian waters, such as San Francisco or Big Sur), and 17 °C (63 °F) in False Bay (similar to Northern Mediterranean temperatures, such as Nice or Monte Carlo).

Unlike other parts of the country, the city does not have many thunderstorms, and most of those that do occur happen around October to December and March to April.

Climate data for Cape Town (Cape Town International Airport) (1991–2020 normals)
Month	Jan	Feb	Mar	Apr	May	Jun	Jul	Aug	Sep	Oct	Nov	Dec	Year
Record high °C (°F)	39.1 (102.4)	38.3 (100.9)	42.1 (107.8)	38.6 (101.5)	33.5 (92.3)	29.8 (85.6)	29.0 (84.2)	32.0 (89.6)	33.1 (91.6)	34.2 (93.6)	40.0 (104.0)	38.4 (101.1)	42.1 (107.8)
Mean maximum °C (°F)	35.8 (96.4)	36.2 (97.2)	34.5 (94.1)	31.0 (87.8)	27.2 (81.0)	23.9 (75.0)	23.4 (74.1)	24.1 (75.4)	26.8 (80.2)	30.2 (86.4)	32.5 (90.5)	34.6 (94.3)	36.2 (97.2)
Mean daily maximum °C (°F)	27.0 (80.6)	27.3 (81.1)	26.0 (78.8)	23.6 (74.5)	20.6 (69.1)	18.2 (64.8)	17.9 (64.2)	18.0 (64.4)	19.6 (67.3)	22.2 (72.0)	23.7 (74.7)	25.8 (78.4)	22.5 (72.5)
Daily mean °C (°F)	23.1 (73.6)	22.2 (72.0)	20.5 (68.9)	17.9 (64.2)	15.4 (59.7)	13.2 (55.8)	12.7 (54.9)	13.0 (55.4)	14.5 (58.1)	16.9 (62.4)	18.6 (65.5)	20.7 (69.3)	17.4 (63.3)
Mean daily minimum °C (°F)	16.6 (61.9)	16.5 (61.7)	15.0 (59.0)	12.2 (54.0)	10.2 (50.4)	8.1 (46.6)	7.4 (45.3)	7.9 (46.2)	9.4 (48.9)	11.5 (52.7)	13.4 (56.1)	15.6 (60.1)	12.0 (53.6)
Mean minimum °C (°F)	12.2 (54.0)	12.3 (54.1)	10.9 (51.6)	8.6 (47.5)	6.4 (43.5)	4.3 (39.7)	3.8 (38.8)	4.2 (39.6)	5.6 (42.1)	7.8 (46.0)	9.5 (49.1)	11.0 (51.8)	2.6 (36.7)
Record low °C (°F)	7.4 (45.3)	6.4 (43.5)	4.6 (40.3)	2.4 (36.3)	0.9 (33.6)	−1.2 (29.8)	−1.3 (29.7)	−0.4 (31.3)	0.2 (32.4)	1.0 (33.8)	3.9 (39.0)	6.2 (43.2)	−1.3 (29.7)
Average precipitation mm (inches)	9.4 (0.37)	9.6 (0.38)	12.5 (0.49)	40.1 (1.58)	61.1 (2.41)	92.3 (3.63)	84.8 (3.34)	72.4 (2.85)	44.3 (1.74)	28.4 (1.12)	25.3 (1.00)	12.8 (0.50)	492.8 (19.40)
Average precipitation days (≥ 0.1 mm)	1.8	1.8	2.5	5.0	7.4	10.1	9.1	9.3	6.8	4.2	4.0	2.6	64.6
Average relative humidity (%)	71	72	74	78	81	81	81	80	77	74	71	71	76
Mean monthly sunshine hours	352.3	304.0	289.7	240.1	196.7	175.9	197.0	206.2	228.4	283.5	302.8	338.4	3,115
Percentage possible sunshine	83	82	76	67	58	53	54	58	64	71	78	81	70
Average ultraviolet index	12	11	8	5	3	2	2	4	6	8	10	12	7
Source 1: NOAA (humidity 1961–1990), South African Weather Service, eNCA
Source 2: South African Weather Service / NOAA

==== Climate change ====
A 2019 paper published in PLOS One estimated that under Representative Concentration Pathway 4.5, a "moderate" scenario of climate change where global warming reaches ~2.5–3 °C (4.5–5.4 °F) by 2100, the climate of Cape Town in the year 2050 would most closely resemble the current climate of Perth in Western Australia.

The annual temperature would increase by 1.1 °C (2.0 °F), and the temperature of the coldest month by 0.3 °C (0.54 °F), while the temperature of the warmest month would be 2.3 °C (4.1 °F) higher. According to Climate Action Tracker, the current warming trajectory appears consistent with 2.7 °C (4.9 °F), which closely matches RCP 4.5.

Moreover, according to the 2022 IPCC Sixth Assessment Report, Cape Town is one of 12 major African cities (Abidjan, Alexandria, Algiers, Cape Town, Casablanca, Dakar, Dar es Salaam, Durban, Lagos, Lomé, Luanda and Maputo) which would be the most severely affected by future sea level rise. It estimates that they would collectively sustain cumulative damages of US$65 billion under RCP 4.5 and US$86.5 billion for the high-emission scenario RCP 8.5 by the year 2050.

Additionally, RCP 8.5 combined with the hypothetical impact from marine ice sheet instability at high levels of warming would involve up to US$137.5 billion in damages, while the additional accounting for the "low-probability, high-damage events" may increase aggregate risks to US$187 billion for the "moderate" RCP4.5, US$206 billion for RCP8.5 and US$397 billion under the high-end ice sheet instability scenario.

Since sea level rise would continue for about 10,000 years under every scenario of climate change, future costs of sea level rise would only increase, especially without adaptation measures.

=== Hydrology ===
==== Sea surface temperatures ====
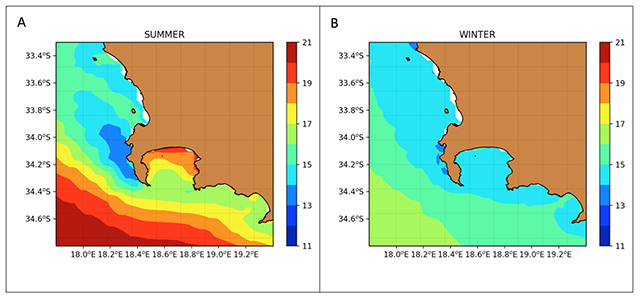
Charts of sea surface temperature in and near False Bay in summer and winter

Cape Town's coastal water ranges from cold to mild, and the difference between the two sides of the peninsula can be dramatic. While the Atlantic Seaboard averages annual sea surface temperatures average between 10 and 15 °C (50 and 59 °F), the False Bay coast is much warmer, averaging between 16 and 22 °C (61 and 72 °F) annually.

In summer, False Bay water averages slightly over 20 °C (68 °F), with 22 °C (72 °F) an occasional high. Beaches located on the Atlantic Coast tend to have colder water due to the wind driven upwellings which contribute to the Benguela Current which originates off the Cape Peninsula, while the water at False Bay beaches may occasionally be warmer by up to 10 °C (18 °F) at the same time in summer.

In summer False Bay is thermally stratified, with a vertical temperature variation of 5 to 9˚C between the warmer surface water and cooler depths below 50 m, while in winter the water column is at nearly constant temperature at all depths. The development of a thermocline is strongest around late December and peaks in late summer to early autumn. In summer the south easterly winds generate a zone of upwelling near Cape Hangklip, where surface water temperatures can be 6 to 7 °C colder than the surrounding areas, and bottom temperatures below 12 °C.

In the summer to early autumn (January–March), cold water upwelling near Cape Hangklip causes a strong surface temperature gradient between the south-western and north-eastern corners of the bay. In winter the surface temperature tends to be much the same everywhere. In the northern sector surface temperature varies a bit more (13 to 22 °C) than in the south (14 to 20 °C) during the year.

Surface temperature variation from year to year is linked to the El Niño–Southern Oscillation. During El Niño years the South Atlantic high is shifted, reducing the south-easterly winds, so upwelling and evaporative cooling are reduced and sea surface temperatures throughout the bay are warmer, while in La Niña years there is more wind and upwelling and consequently lower temperatures. Surface water heating during El Niño increases vertical stratification. The relationship is not linear. Occasionally eddies from the Agulhas current will bring warmer water and vagrant sea life carried from the south and east coasts into False Bay.

=== Flora and fauna ===
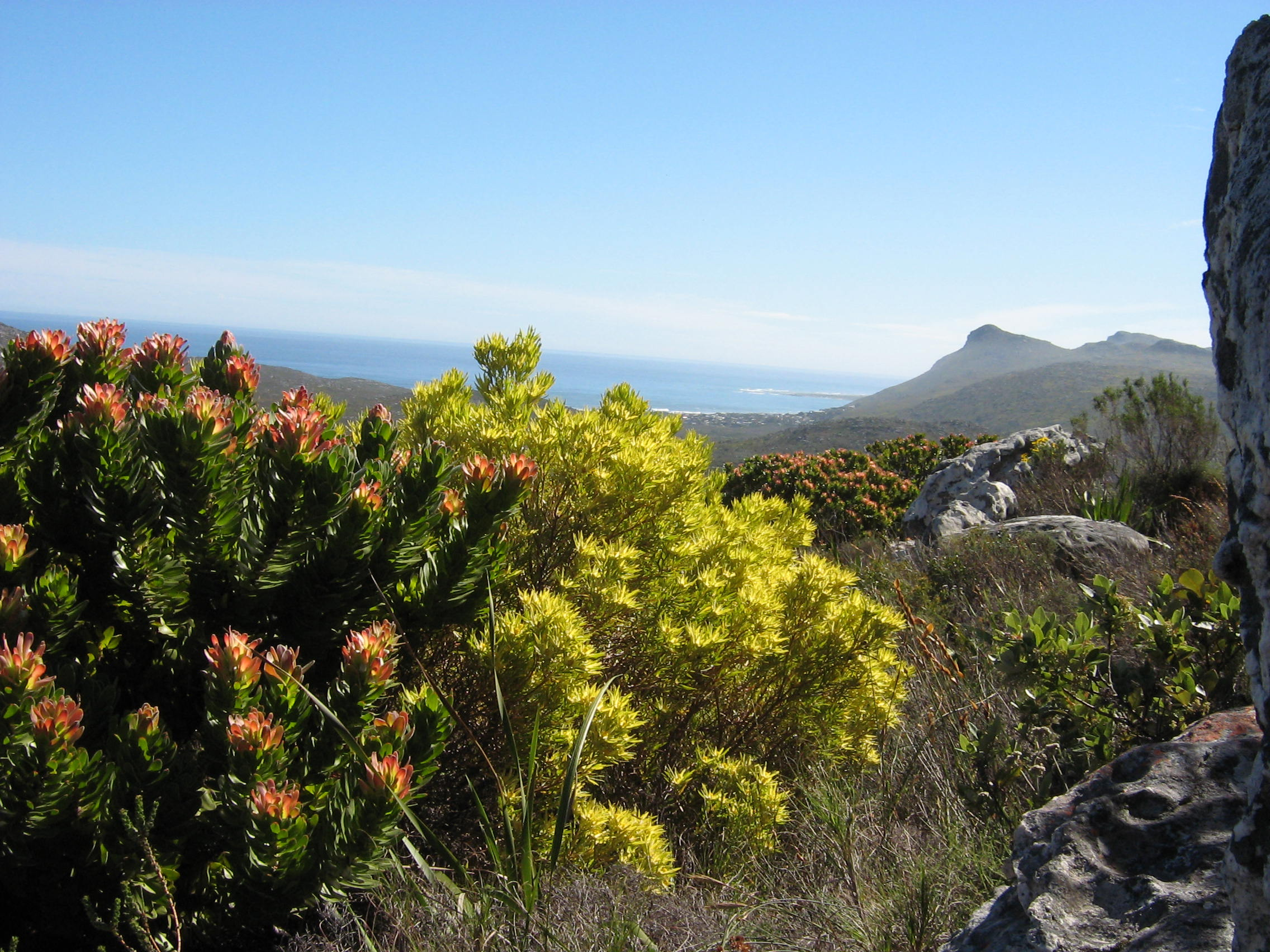
Peninsula Sandstone Fynbos growing in Table Mountain National Park.

Located in a Conservation International biodiversity hotspot as well as the unique Cape Floristic Region, the city of Cape Town has one of the highest levels of biodiversity of any equivalent area in the world.

These protected areas are a World Heritage Site, and an estimated 2,200 species of plants are confined to Table Mountain – more than exist in the whole of the United Kingdom which has 1200 plant species and 67 endemic plant species. Many of these species, including a great many types of proteas, are endemic to the mountain and can be found nowhere else.

It is home to a total of 19 different vegetation types, of which several are endemic to the city and occur nowhere else in the world. It is also the only habitat of hundreds of endemic species, and hundreds of others which are severely restricted or threatened. This enormous species diversity is mainly because the city is uniquely located at the convergence point of several different soil types and micro-climates.

Table Mountain has an unusually rich biodiversity. Its vegetation consists predominantly of several different types of the unique and rich Cape Fynbos. The main vegetation type is endangered Peninsula Sandstone Fynbos, but critically endangered Peninsula Granite Fynbos, Peninsula Shale Renosterveld and Afromontane forest occur in smaller portions on the mountain.

Rapid population growth and urban sprawl has covered much of these ecosystems with development. Consequently, Cape Town now has over 300 threatened plant species and 13 which are now extinct. The Cape Peninsula, which lies entirely within the city of Cape Town, has the highest concentration of threatened species of any continental area of equivalent size in the world.

Tiny remnant populations of critically endangered or near extinct plants sometimes survive on road sides, pavements and sports fields. The remaining ecosystems are partially protected through a system of over 30 nature reserves – including the massive Table Mountain National Park.

Cape Town reached first place in the 2019 iNaturalist City Nature Challenge in two out of the three categories: Most Observations, and Most Species. This was the first entry by Capetonians in this annual competition to observe and record the local biodiversity over a four-day long weekend during what is considered the worst time of the year for local observations.

A worldwide survey suggested that the extinction rate of endemic plants from the City of Cape Town is one of the highest in the world, at roughly three per year since 1900 – partly a consequence of the very small and localised habitats and high endemicity.

In 2025, City of Cape Town enacted the Cape Town Biodiversity Spatial Plan (CTBSP) 2025, a biodiversity policy aimed at guiding development in the city. The plan integrates the Cape Town BioNet 2024 Map, which identifies areas to protect to ensure environmental sustainability, and categorizes them into Protected Areas, Critical Biodiversity Areas, Ecological Support Areas, and Other Natural Areas. The policy will help guide spatial planning, environmental assessments, and natural resource management across sectors, and sets a framework for the internal alignment of environmental responsibilities across all City departments.

22.72% of Cape Town's municipal land, totaling 55,697 hectares, is under conservation. Of this, 20,039 hectares are managed by the City within 22 nature reserves and 16 Biodiversity Agreement Conservation Areas, many of which are open to the public.

== Government ==
Cape Town is governed by a 231-member city council elected in a system of mixed-member proportional representation. The city is divided into 116 wards, each of which elects a councillor by first-past-the-post voting. The remaining 115 councillors are elected from party lists so that the total number of councillors for each party is proportional to the number of votes received by that party.

In the 2021 Municipal Elections, the Democratic Alliance (DA) kept its majority, this time diminished, taking 136 seats. The African National Congress lost substantially, receiving 43 of the seats. The Democratic Alliance candidate for the Cape Town mayoralty, Geordin Hill-Lewis was elected mayor.

In recent years, Cape Town has developed a reputation for good governance, with the city's infrastructure spending and upkeep, political stability, CBD safety, and municipal service delivery being generally regarded as the best out of all the major metropolitan areas in South Africa. In 2025, Cape Town was, for the third year in a row, the only metropolitan municipality in South Africa to receive a clean audit outcome from its Auditor General (AG), Tsakani Maluleke.

According to the AG, municipalities that achieve clean audits display strong financial and performance management, whilst adhering to legislative requirements, and Cape Town is a model of governance and accountability. The AG further stated that Cape Town showed strong leadership, skilled personnel, accurate records, credible reporting to communities, and good quality planning and performance management. The city has maintained its clean audit status since 2021.

=== Budget ===
Municipal budgets in SA are set every 3 years, according to the Medium-Term Revenue and Expenditure Framework (MTREF). Some metros, including Cape Town, announce their annual budgets as well.

The City of Cape Town tabled a roughly R86 billion budget for its 2026/2027 financial year, equating to around a 2-3% increase year-over-year, in line with inflation. Cape Town has one of the highest per capita budgets out of all SA metros, and in the 2025/2026 financial year, its total budget constituted around 20% of the total combined budgets of SA's eight metros.

Approximately R73 billion for that same year was allocated towards the City's operating budget (service delivery), with a further approximately R13 billion going towards its capital budget (infrastructure development). The City spends significantly on infrastructure, in line with its commitment to spend R40 billion over three years to improve various aspects of its infrastructure. A large portion of that spending has in recent years gone towards low-income areas.

For the 2025/2026 financial year, focus areas for the City's capital budget included the MyCiTi BRT Phase 2 expansion, water network upgrades, expanding the SSU CCTV network, deploying more Metro Police officers, and building small scale energy plants. The City also incorporated a significant social package as part of that year's budget, including adjusted rebates for homes under a certain value. Furthermore, the City absorbed the majority of an 11% electricity tariff placed on metros by Eskom, increasing rates for Cape Town residents by just 2%.

==== Allocation of rates ====
Cape Town has the lowest rates out of all South African metros. However, naturally, due to the size of Cape Town's population and the value of its real estate market, significant rates are raised each year. The City details how it allocates those rates. For the 2025/2026 budget, the City stated that for every R1 in rates paid, the allocation was as follows:

- 29% to law enforcement, metro police, fire, and traffic services
- 15% to free and subsidized services
- 15% to customer care, IT, and service delivery
- 14% to infrastructure investment and human settlements
- 13% to parks, the environment, and libraries
- 6% to economic growth, tourism, and informal trading
- 4% to city clinics and health services
- 4% to the MyCiTi public transport network
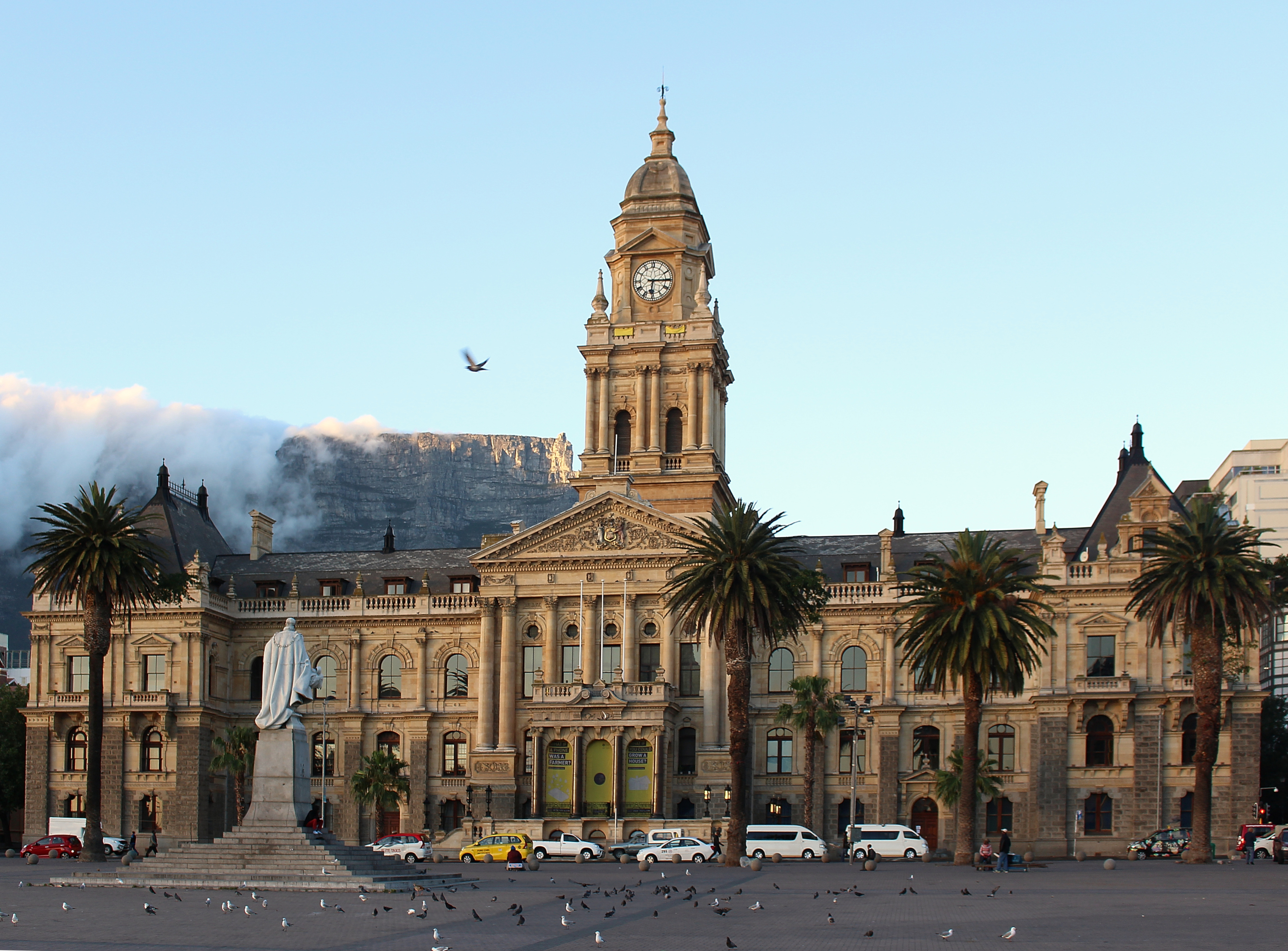
The Old Cape Town City Hall as seen from the Grand Parade in front of the building.

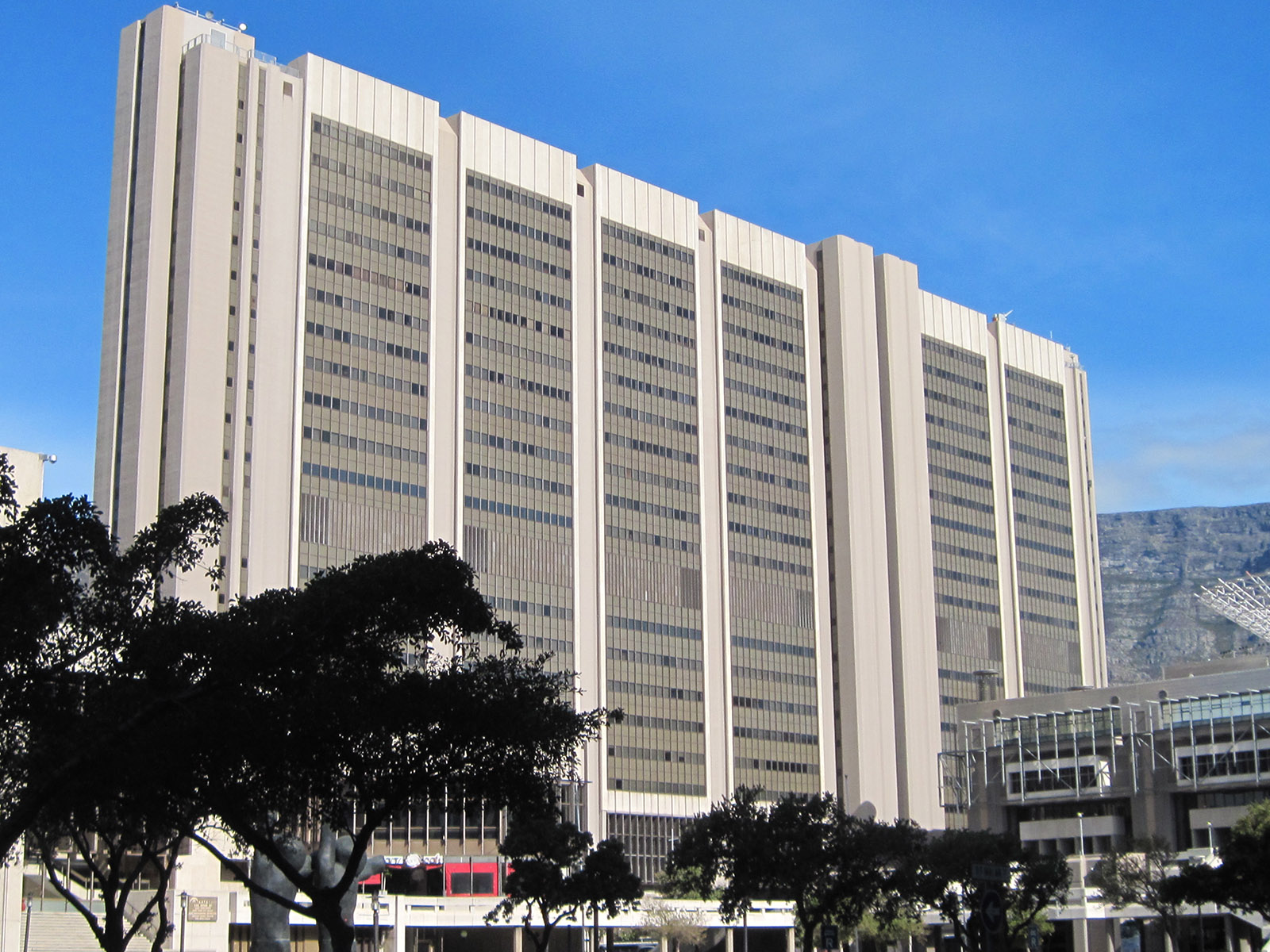
The Cape Town Civic Centre, the central offices of the City of Cape Town.

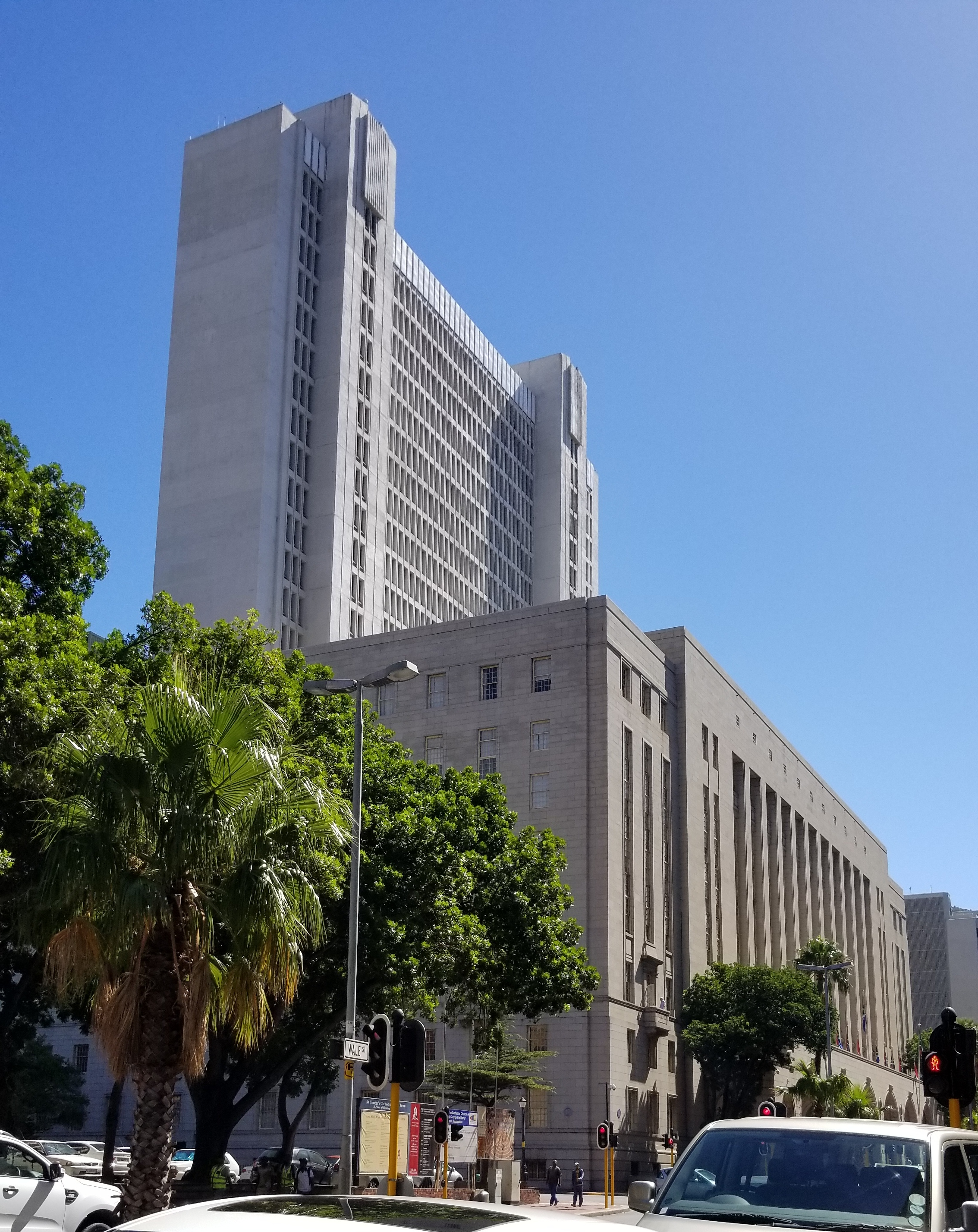
The Western Cape Provincial Parliament

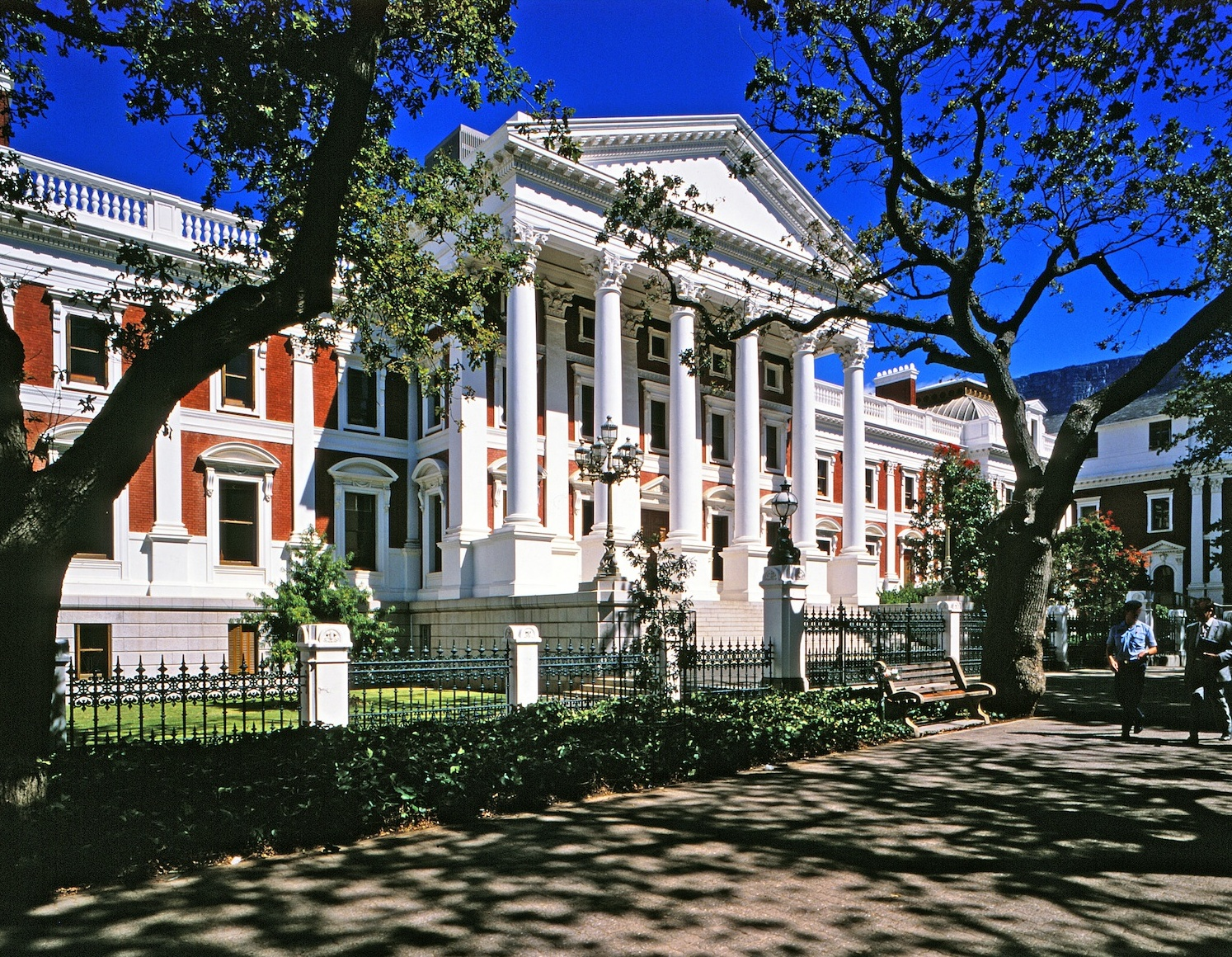
South Africa's national parliament building is located in Cape Town.

=== International relations ===
Cape Town has nineteen active sister city agreements

- Aachen, Germany
- Accra, Ghana
- Atlanta, United States
- Buenos Aires, Argentina
- Bujumbura, Burundi
- Dubai, United Arab Emirates
- Hangzhou, China
- Houston, United States
- Huangshan, China
- İzmir, Turkey
- Los Angeles, United States
- Malmö, Sweden
- Miami-Dade County, United States
- Monterrey, Mexico
- Munich, Germany
- Nairobi, Kenya
- Rio de Janeiro, Brazil
- Shenzhen, China
- Varna, Bulgaria
- Wuhan, China

==== 2022 invasion of Ukraine ====
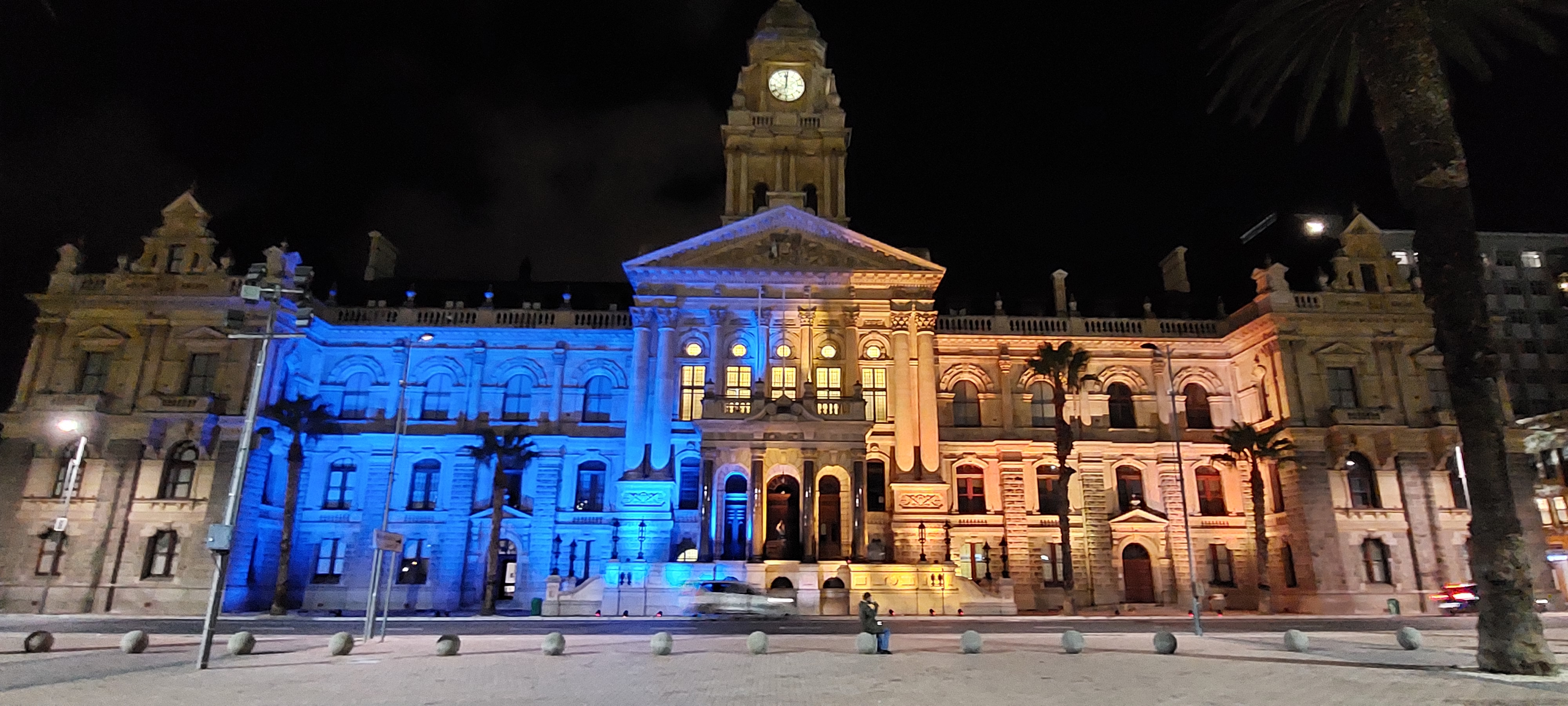
Cape Town City hall lit up in the colours of the Ukrainian flag as a gesture of solidarity with the country.

The City of Cape Town has expressed explicit support for Ukraine during the 2022 invasion of the country by Russia. To show this support the City of Cape Town lit up the Old City Hall in the colours of the Ukrainian flag on 2 March 2022. This has differentiated the city from the officially neutral foreign policy position taken by the South African national government.

== Demographics ==
Historical population

Year	Pop.	±% p.a.
1658	360	—
1731	3,157	+3.02%
1823	15,500	+1.74%
1833	19,227	+2.18%
1836	20,000	+1.32%
1875	45,000	+2.10%
1891	67,000	+2.52%
1901	171,000	+9.82%
1936	344,223	+2.02%
1950	618,000	+4.27%
1955	705,000	+2.67%
1960	803,000	+2.64%
1965	945,000	+3.31%
1970	1,114,000	+3.35%

Year	Pop.	±% p.a.
1975	1,339,000	+3.75%
1980	1,609,000	+3.74%
1985	1,933,000	+3.74%
1990	2,296,000	+3.50%
1996	2,565,018	+1.86%
2001	2,892,243	+2.43%
2007	3,497,097	+3.22%
2011	3,740,025	+1.69%
2016	4,004,793	+1.38%
2021	4,678,900	+3.16%
2022	4,772,846	+2.01%
2023	4,890,000	+2.45%
2024	4,978,000	+1.80%
2025	5,064,000	+1.73%

Note: Census figures (1996–2011) cover figures after 1994 reflect the greater Cape Town metropolitan municipality reflecting post-1994 reforms. Sources: 1658–1904, 1823, 1833, 1936, 1950–1990, 1996, 2001, and 2011 Census; 2007, 2016 & 2021, 2022 2023, 2024, & 2025

Cape Town population pyramid in 2011

Population density in Cape Town

According to the South African National Census of 2011, the population of the City of Cape Town metropolitan municipality – an area that includes suburbs and exurbs – is 3,740,026 people. This represents an annual growth rate of 2.6% compared to the results of the previous census in 2001 which found a population of 2,892,243 people.

Of those residents who were asked about their first language, 35.7% spoke Afrikaans, 29.8% spoke Xhosa and 28.4% spoke English. 24.8% of the population is under the age of 15, while 5.5% is 65 or older. The sex ratio is 0.96, meaning that there are slightly more women than men.

Of those residents aged 20 or older, 1.8% have no schooling, 8.1% have some schooling but did not finish primary school, 4.6% finished primary school but have no secondary schooling, 38.9% have some secondary schooling but did not finish Grade 12, 29.9% finished Grade 12 but have no higher education, and 16.7% have higher education.

Overall, 46.6% have at least a Grade 12 education. Of those aged between 5 and 25, 67.8% are attending an educational institution. Amongst those aged between 15 and 65 the unemployment rate is 23.7%.

The average annual household income in the Western Cape, of which Cape Town is the capital and largest city, is South Africa's highest, by a large margin. As of June 2025, the province's average household income is R407,000. This amount is 35% higher than second-place Gauteng, and 50% above the national average.

The total number of households grew from 653,085 in 1996 to 1,068,572 in 2011, which represents an increase of 63.6%. The average number of household members declined from 3,92 in 1996 to 3,50 in 2011. Of those households, 78.4% are in formal structures (houses or flats), while 20.5% are in informal structures (shacks).

97.3% of City-supplied households have access to electricity, and 94.0% of households use electricity for lighting. 87.3% of households have piped water to the dwelling, while 12.0% have piped water through a communal tap. 94.9% of households have regular refuse collection service.

91.4% of households have a flush toilet or chemical toilet, while 4.5% still use a bucket toilet. 82.1% of households have a refrigerator, 87.3% have a television and 70.1% have a radio. Only 34.0% have a landline telephone, but 91.3% have a cellphone. 37.9% have a computer, and 49.3% have access to the Internet (either through a computer or a cellphone).

In 2011 over 70% of cross provincial South African migrants coming into the Western Cape settled in Cape Town; 53.64% of South African migrants into the Western Cape came from the Eastern Cape, the old Cape Colony's former native reserve, and 20.95% came from Gauteng province.

Cape Town has a young population. In the 2022 census, the median age of residents in the city was 31. In the same year, approximately 40% of the population of Cape Town was under the age of 25.

According to the 2016 City of Cape Town community survey, there were 4,004,793 people in the City of Cape Town metro. Out of this population, 45.7% identified as Black African, 35.1% identified as Coloured, 16.2% identified as White and 1.6% identified as Asian.

The Western Cape province, in which Cape Town is the largest city, has the highest rate of marriage out of all South African provinces, by a significant margin. In the 2022 census, 33.8% of those in the province were legally married – almost 10% higher than the next province. In the same census, 50.6% of Western Cape residents had never been married – the lowest out of all South African provinces.

During the outbreak of the COVID-19 pandemic in South Africa, local media reported that increasing numbers of wealthy and middle-class South Africans have started moving from inland areas of the country to coastal regions – most notably Cape Town – in a phenomenon referred to as "semigration" – short for "semi-emigration" Declining municipal services in the rest of the country and the South African energy crisis are other cited reasons for semigration.

In 2022, the city expected its population to grow by an additional 400,000 residents between 2020 and 2025, with 76% of those new residents falling into the low-income bracket, earning less than R13,000 a month.

According to the United Nations' World Urbanization Prospects (2018), Cape Town's population is projected to continue growing steadily over the next decade. Based on estimates compiled by the Department of Economic and Social Affairs in 2018, the city's population is expected to reach approximately 5.468 million by 2030, and roughly 5.845 million by 2035.

Ethnic make-up of Cape Town
Race	1996		2001		2011		2022	
Race	Number	Percent	Number	Percent	Number	Percent	Number	Percent
Black	644,181	25.10%	916,635	31.70%	1,444,939	38.60%	2,181,190	45.70%
Coloured	1,239,943	48.40%	1,392,594	48.10%	1,585,286	42.40%	1,670,496	35.00%
White	543,425	21.20%	542,540	18.80%	585,831	15.70%	773,201	16.20%
Indian/Asian	37,882	1.50%	41,477	1.40%	43,593	1.40%	76,365	1.60%

=== Religion ===
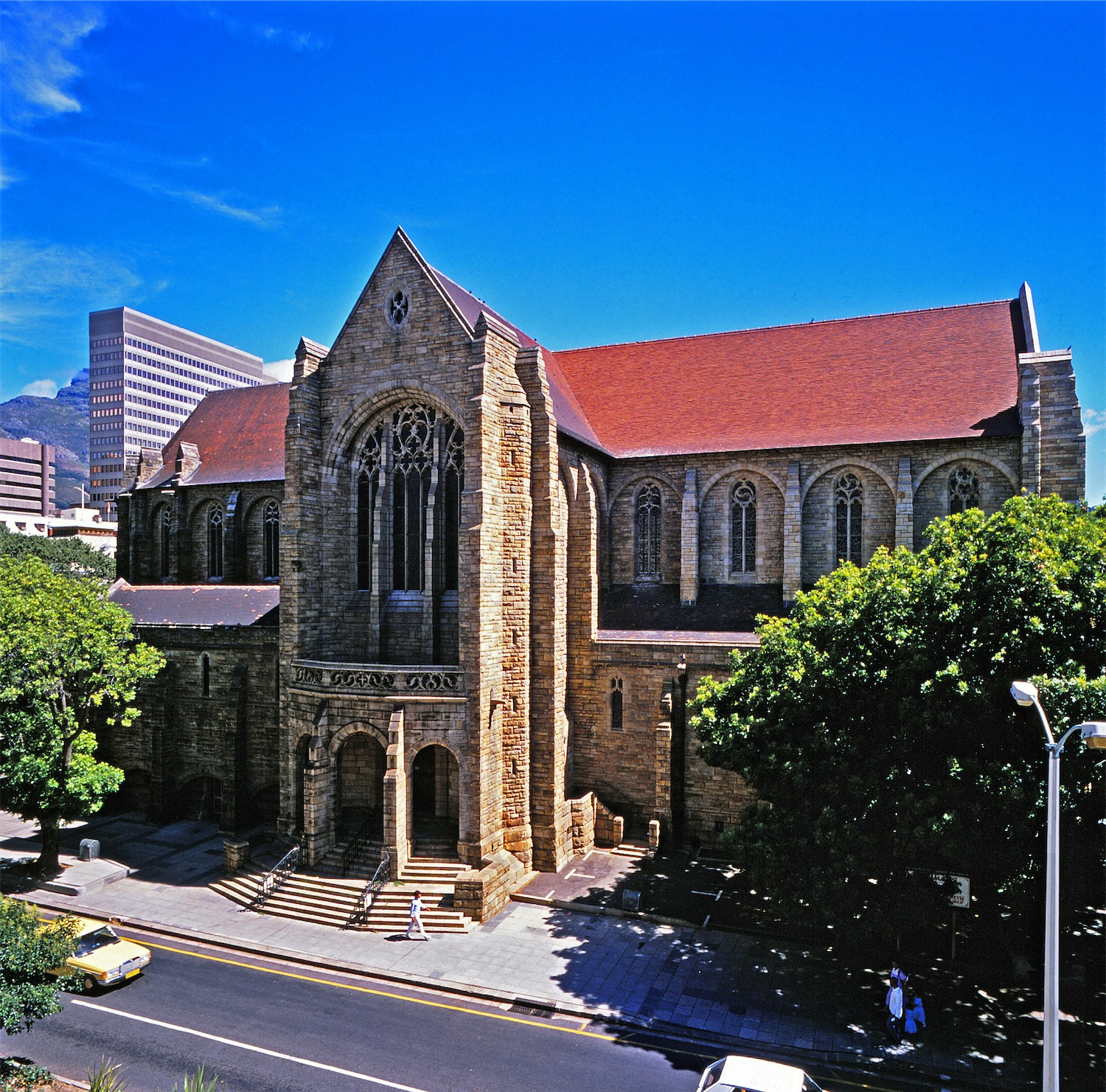
St George's Anglican Cathedral is one of the largest and oldest religious sites in the city.

In the 2022 South African Census, religious data were gathered for the Western Cape province, of which Cape Town is the capital and largest city (with 64.21% of the province's population residing in the City of Cape Town metro area). The Western Cape census respondents self-identified as follows:

- 85.6% as Christian
- 5.2% as Muslim
- 5.3% as following a traditional African religion
- 2% as having no religious affiliation
- 0.8% as "other"
- 0.3% as Agnostic
- 0.3% as Atheist
- 0.2% as Hindu
- 0.2% as Jewish
- 0.1% as Buddhist

As of 2022, a total of 2.6% of Western Cape residents are irreligious.

Most places of worship in Cape Town are Christian churches and cathedrals. These include the Dutch Reformed Church in South Africa (NGK), Zion Christian Church, Apostolic Faith Mission of South Africa, Assemblies of God, Baptist Union of Southern Africa (Baptist World Alliance), Methodist Church of Southern Africa (World Methodist Council), Anglican Church of Southern Africa (Anglican Communion), Presbyterian Church of Africa (World Communion of Reformed Churches), Roman Catholic Archdiocese of Cape Town (Catholic Church), the Orthodox Archbishopric of Good Hope (Greek Orthodox Cathedral of St George), and the Church of Jesus Christ of Latter-day Saints (LDS Church).

Islam is the city's second largest religion with a long history in Cape Town. This has resulted in a number of mosques and other Muslim religious sites spread across the city, such as the Auwal Mosque - South Africa's first mosque.

Cape Town's significant Jewish population supports a number of synagogues, the most notable of which is the historic Gardens Shul, the oldest Jewish congregation in South Africa. Marais Road Shul, located in Sea Point (a suburb with a notable Jewish population), is the largest Jewish congregation in South Africa. Temple Israel (Cape Town Progressive Jewish Congregation) also has three temples in the city. Other affiliated institutions include a Chabad centre in Sea Point and a Chabad on Campus at the University of Cape Town, catering to Jewish students.

Other religious sites in the city include Hindu and Buddhist temples and centres.

=== Crime ===
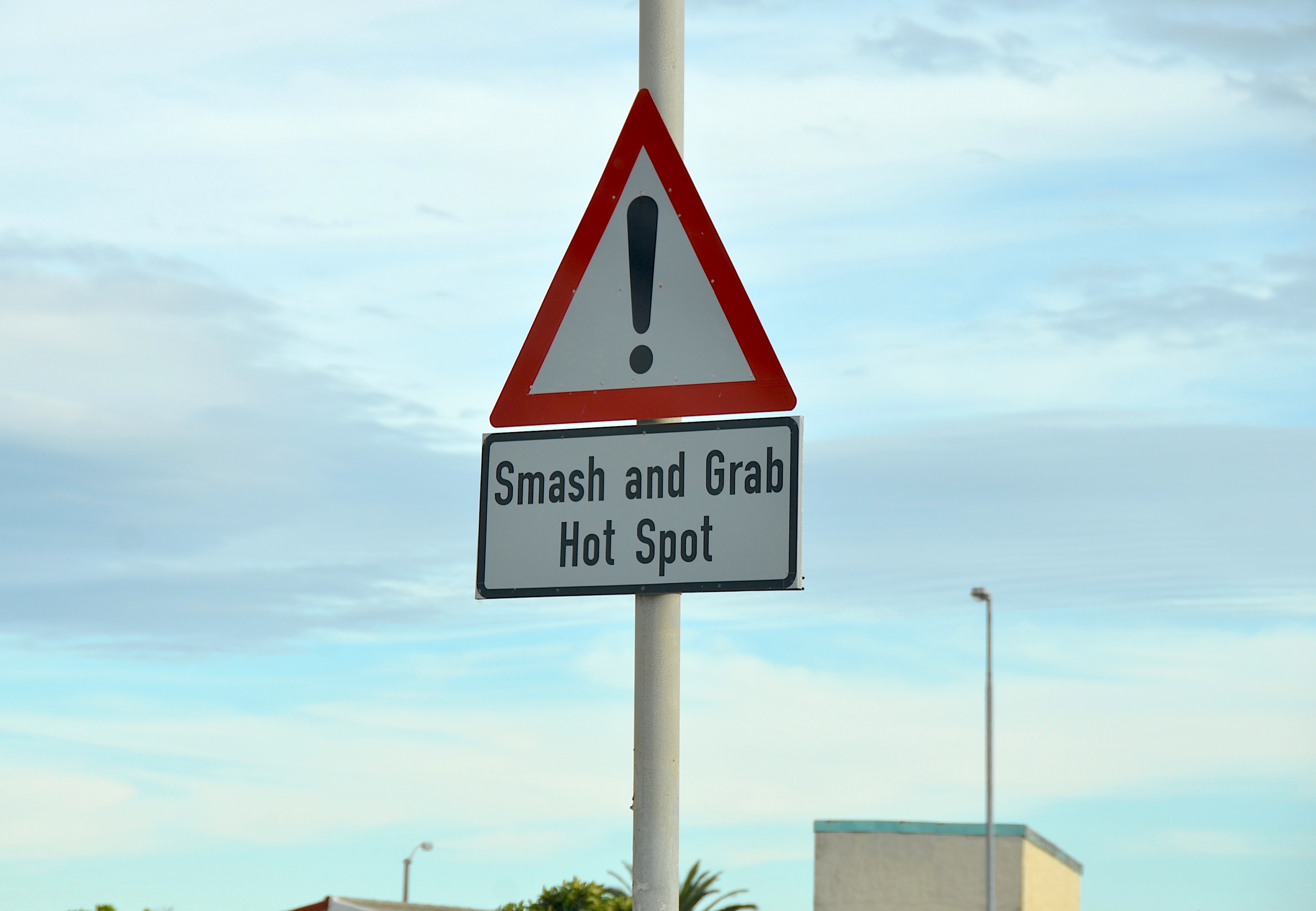
Sign warning motorists about the prevalence of smash and grab incidents at a "Crime Hot Spot" on the M5 freeway, between the lower-income neighbourhoods of Grassy Park and Retreat, situated in the Cape Flats region of the city

==== Overview ====
In recent years, the City of Cape Town (metro government) has made significant progress in combatting crime across Cape Town. Measures include the expanded use of digital tools, such as CCTV cameras and UAVs; increased Highway Patrol presence; substantially increased numbers of Law Enforcement officers; dispatching specialized teams of officers to areas based on the types of localized crimes there; targeting areas of specifically high crime; and lobbying the national government for more control (via the devolution of powers) over local policing.

Measures also include facilitating collaboration between various local and provincial law enforcement agencies and units (including the Traffic Service, Highway Patrol, Flying Squad, Ghost Squad, Law Enforcement, LEAP, LEAS, Disaster Volunteers, Gang and Drug Task Team, Metal Theft Unit, and SSU).

Overall, Cape Town has historically had high levels of violent crime. However, these city-wide statistics are heavily skewed and predominantly driven by gang violence in specific suburbs, many of which are located in the lower-income Cape Flats region of the city. This situation has created quite a disparity between safety levels amongst residents of Cape Town, with those in many of the city's suburbs enjoying a life devoid of the kinds of risks faced by those living in and commuting through high-crime neighbourhoods.

Crime in Cape Town in general is attributed to various factors, many of which are shared with other major South African metros. These include economic inequality (which can be linked to the legacy of apartheid's spatial and social divisions), unemployment, alcohol abuse, the prevalence of illegal firearms, a lack of rehabilitation and support services for offenders leading to recidivism, and a lack of community safety organizations.

Crime in Cape Town is a serious problem which affects the quality of life and safety of its residents and visitors. Between 2022 and 2023, Cape Town recorded the highest number of murders in a single year of any city in the world, at 2,998, followed by fellow South African metros Johannesburg and Durban. This represented an increase of 8.6% year-on-year. Household crimes including burglary also increased in the same period. In 2022, Mexico's Citizen Council for Public Security and Criminal Justice ranked Cape Town among the most violent cities in the world, based on average crime statistics across all suburbs.

The minibus taxi industry has been the source of a number of violent confrontations in the city. The northern and eastern sections of the city was the scene of the 2021 Cape Town taxi conflict, a violent turf war which led to 83 deaths. The 2023 Cape Town taxi strike resulted in 5 recorded deaths.

==== Localization of crime ====
As with other major metropolitan areas in South Africa, the majority of crime in Cape Town tends to be concentrated in very specific areas, more often than not being the Cape Flats, indicating the potential success of place-based crime intelligence methods.

In Cape Town, a lot of the crime that occurs, especially violent crime, takes place in the neighbourhoods of Philippi East (a notorious area for such crime), Delft, Nyanga, Mfuleni, Gugulethu, Elsies River, Bishop Lavis, Grassy Park, Lentegeur, Kleinvlei, and Mitchell's Plain. All of these suburbs are best avoided (even during transit) by locals and tourists.

Other notable areas for violent crime include Kraaifontein, Atlantis, Athlone, Kleinvlei, Khayelitsha, Harare, Bishop Lavis, Muizenberg, Lingelethu-West, Table View, Bellville, Parow, Goodwood, Milnerton, and Makhaza. These suburbs are also best avoided (even during transit) by locals and tourists.

Notable areas for high rates of non-violent crime include Cape Town CBD, Steenberg, Wynberg, Sea Point, Woodstock, Samora Machel, Claremont, Somerset West, Brackenfell, Ravensmead, Philippi, and Strand.

==== Travellers ====
While the UK Foreign Office considers Cape Town safe to travel to, it notes high crime rates on certain roads leading to and from Cape Town International Airport. These include the R300 regional road, and Borcherds Quarry Road. The Foreign Office recommends using the M3 metropolitan freeway and N2 national freeway instead of the R300, and recommends using the Airport Approach Road (Exit 16 on the N2), instead of Borcherds Quarry Road. Doing so allows drivers to avoid being routed to and through high-crime areas and intersections.

==== Community initiatives ====
For certain activities in which locals partake, members of the community have come together to increase safety in Cape Town. An example for hiking - a popular pastime in Cape Town - is the Hikers Network's SafetyMountain Tracking, a WhatsApp-based emergency service manned by volunteers. The service tracks hikers and other mountain users (such as runners and cyclists) on their adventures, giving them instant access to assistance in case of an emergency, such as injury, sudden illness, rockfall, getting lost, and crime.

==== Recent improvements ====
In early 2025, the City of Cape Town announced that progress had been made in combatting crime, with crime levels in certain notorious areas decreasing, according to statistics based on community reporting of incidents of crime. Daily patrol officers were complimented for their efforts, and the City said it was working closely with the Western Cape Government and the South African Police Service to adjust its law enforcement efforts according to changes in the city's crime statistics.

Despite the crime levels, the city's economy has grown, as a result of good governance, investments in infrastructure, and an attractive business environment, as well as due to growth in the local tourism and real estate industries. Since July 2019 widespread violent crime in poorer gang dominated areas of greater Cape Town has resulted in an ongoing military presence in these neighbourhoods.

In terms of minibus taxi safety, the Western Cape Government now takes to special measures during times of high crime, whereby it temporarily shuts down specific routes that are directly impacted. The Province is able to invoke Section 91 of the National Land Transport Act, a legal provision that allows a provincial government to impose extraordinary measures when violence, unrest, or instability in the public transport sector places lives at risk. Such measures were taken by the Western Cape Mobility Department for 30 days (with a subsequent extension), on routes in Mfuleni, Somerset West, Khayelitsha, Nomzamo, and Lwandle, in late 2025.

In 2025, Cape Town's Mayoral Committee Member (MCM) for Safety and Security, JP Smith, said that the expanded use of digital tools to complement law enforcement efforts has become part of the city's public safety operations. These tools include a vast network of CCTV cameras and drones, which have already proven successful in assisting with both arrests and prosecution.

== Economy ==
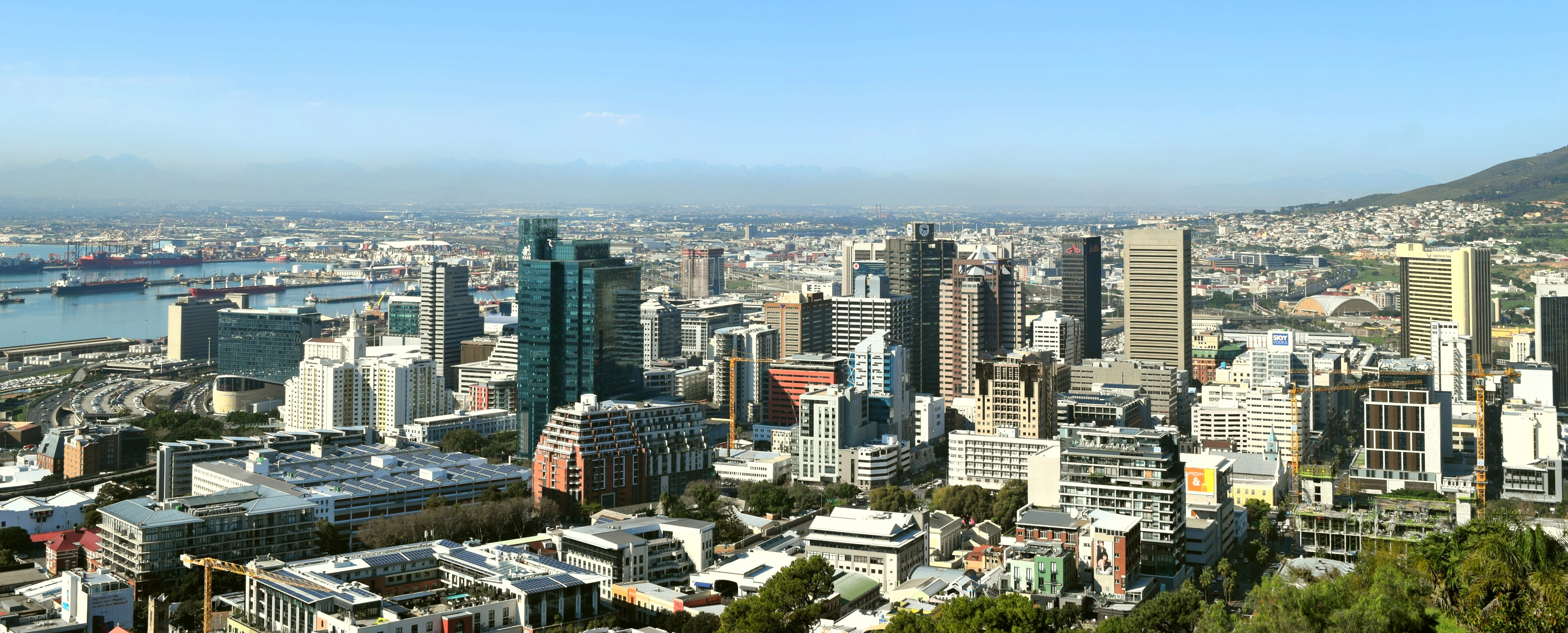
Cape Town CBD is the main economic hub of the city, housing the headquarters of many of South Africa's largest companies, as well as numerous tourist attractions and amenities for residents

Largest South African JSE-listed companies headquartered in Cape Town, ranked by August 2026 market capitalization
JSE Rank	Company	Industry	Market cap
2	Naspers	Mass media	R577.30 billion
12	Sanlam	Finance	R177.83 billion
14	Shoprite	Retail	R162.79 billion
25	Pepkor	Retail	R73.54 billion
29	Old Mutual	Finance	R52.96 billion
31	Clicks	Retail	R46.65 billion
32	Santam	Finance	R45.42 billion
33	Ninety One	Finance	R43.57 billion
39	Woolworths	Retail	R39.25 billion
55	Truworths	Retail	R18.35 billion
56	TFG	Retail	R16.49 billion
60	Equites	Real estate	R15.31 billion
62	Coronation Fund Managers	Finance	R14.93 billion
63	Fairvest	Real estate	R14.33 billion
64	Pick n Pay	Retail	R13.93 billion
68	Hosken Consolidated Investments	Finance	R11.91 billion
84	Stor-Age Property REIT	Real estate	R8.2 billion
85	Oceana Group	Food	R7.75 billion
103	Spear REIT	Real estate	R5.27 billion
105	Sygnia	Finance	R4.87 billion

Cape Town is Africa's third-largest economic hub, and South Africa's second-largest by annual gross metropolitan output. It serves as the regional financial and manufacturing center in the Western Cape province.

The city has a diverse economy that is not significantly reliant on any particular sector. Major industries in Cape Town include tech, renewable energy, retail, finance, boat building, film, and conferences.

The financial sector accounts for 22% of the Western Cape's annual economic output, as of 2025.

Cape Town is considered a global tech hub, and is home to numerous startups, startup incubators, and large tech companies. In 2025, Cape Town's tech sector was growing at an annual rate of 8%.

The city also has a substantial Green Economy, with numerous renewable energy companies headquartered in the metro, and around R15 billion invested into the sector in 2024 alone.

=== Income levels ===
As of June 2025, Cape Town has South Africa's highest average household income, as well as the country's lowest rate of unemployment, and strongest-performing property market.

The average annual household income in the Western Cape is the highest in South Africa. As of June 2025, the province's average household income is R407,000. This amount is 35% higher than second-place Gauteng, and 50% above the national average.

=== Employment levels ===
The professional, scientific, and technical services sector accounts for 23.34% (around 254,600 people) of the city's employment, which is the highest of any other industry.

The construction industry is the third-largest by number of employees, as it accounts for 9.29% (around 101,300 people) of the city's employment. The manufacturing sector, the second largest sector, also accounts for a large part of the city's employment opportunities as it provides 18.15% of the city's employment.

Whereas unemployment has increased in numerous major cities across the country in recent years, in Cape Town, employment has increased. In 2025, it was reported that the city had diverged from a national trend, and added 86,000 jobs. The Mayor of Cape Town attributed this growth to good governance and infrastructure investments, creating an attractive business environment, and an increase in tourism.

The Western Cape's unemployment levels are below the national average. Formal sector jobs in the Western Cape grew by 3.1% in 2024 - 61% higher than the national average.

=== Economic output and growth ===
In 2008, Cape Town was considered the most entrepreneurial city in South Africa, with the percentage of Capetonians pursuing business opportunities almost three times higher than the national average. Capetonians aged between 18 and 64 were 190% more likely to pursue new business, whilst in Johannesburg, the same demographic group was only 60% more likely than the national average to pursue a new business.

In 2019, the city's GMP of R489 billion (US$33.04 billion) represented 71.1% of the Western Cape's total GRP and 9.6% of South Africa's total GDP; the city also accounted for 11.1% of all employed people in the country and had a citywide GDP per capita of R111,364 (US$7,524).

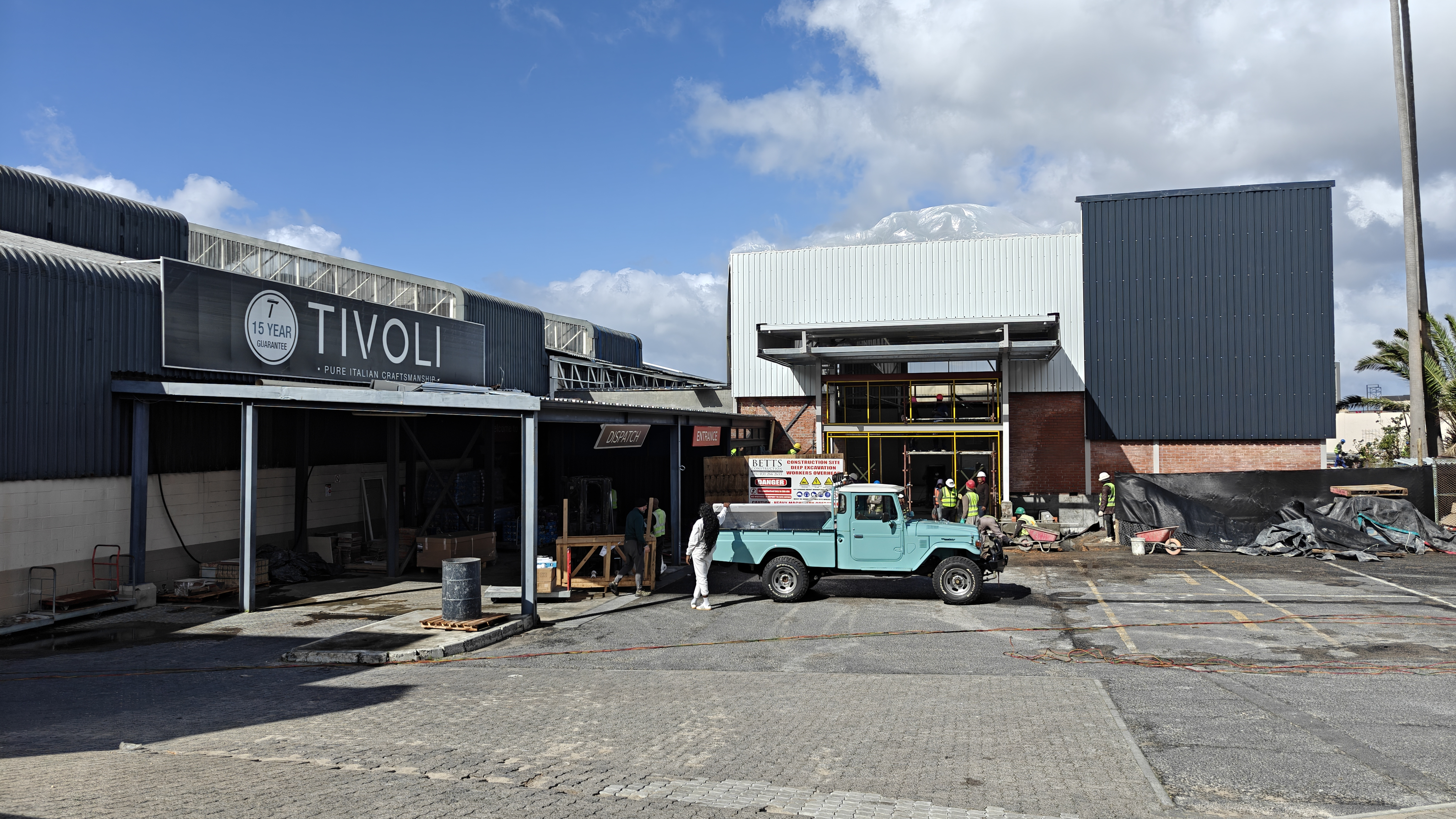
A commercial construction site in the suburb of Tokai

As of 2024, Cape Town's labor force consists of 1.1 million workers. The largest sector in Cape Town is the professional and business services industry, which accounts for 29.61% of the city's workforce.

Cape Town is home to the headquarters of many of South Africa's largest companies, across a variety of industries, many of which are located in its CBD. As of 2022 data, 8 of South Africa's 50 largest companies by annual revenue were headquartered in Cape Town.

Cape Town has significantly above-average economic performance amongst its South African metropolitan peers, and numerous companies have moved employees and their headquarters to the city in recent years. In 2025, according to Statistics South Africa (Stats SA), Cape Town had the lowest unemployment rate out of all South African cities.

=== Major industries ===
Cape Town's economy consists of a diverse mix of industries. The professional, scientific, and technical services sector forms a major part of the local economy. This sector includes a variety of fields, such as software development, management, accounting, consulting, architecture, design, engineering, legal, and RND.

==== Tech ====
Cape Town is recognized as a global tech hub, and is considered Africa's main tech hub. The city is home to the headquarters of many startups and established tech companies. Growing at an annual rate of 8.5%, the tech industry is a major part of Cape Town's economy. Cape Town is home to numerous tech company headquarters, including those of Parket, Admyt, ParkUpp, Xneelo, Jumo, Aerobotics, Cue, Vault22, Rain, and Luno.

Fintech is a particularly strong niche for Cape Town, and the city is home to over 60 fintech startups. Major fintech companies with their headquarters in Cape Town include Yoco, Payfast, SnapScan, Zapper, Peach Payments, and Mukuru.

The city also has HQs for a number of companies in the space industry.

Cape Town is also home to the headquarters of fibre network operators (FNOs) Frogfoot and Octotel. The city also houses a regional office of FNO Liquid Intelligent Technologies. A number of entrepreneurial initiatives hosting tech startups, such as the Sun Exchange, are located in the city.

In terms of foreign tech companies, Cape Town houses the Africa HQ of ecommerce company Amazon, located at Riverlands, as well as the second global hub of fintech ClearScore.

==== Retail ====
Cape Town is a hub for South Africa's retail industry as a whole, with the city housing the headquarters of nine of South Africa's major retail companies, including all but one of its largest supermarket chains.

Major brick and mortar retailers headquartered in Cape Town include Woolworths (including Absolute Pets); Pick n Pay; Shoprite (including Checkers and Petshop Science); Pepkor (including Pep and Ackermans); MRP; TFG (including Foschini, Sportscene, TotalSports, and Bash); Clicks (including Sorbet); Truworths; and Cape Union Mart.

South Africa's largest online retailer, Takealot (including home delivery subsidiary Mr D) has its headquarters in Cape Town CBD.

Other, smaller retailers headquartered in Cape Town include Yuppiechef, Stodels, and Wootware.

==== Media ====
Mass media is another of Cape Town's major industries. The city is home to the headquarters of numerous of South Africa's largest print and digital news publications. Some of these are part of large mass media corporations, while others are independent, like Daily Maverick.

The headquarters of eMedia are located in Cape Town. eMedia operates South Africa's largest privately owned free-to-air television station, e.tv, as well as major digital news publication eNCA.

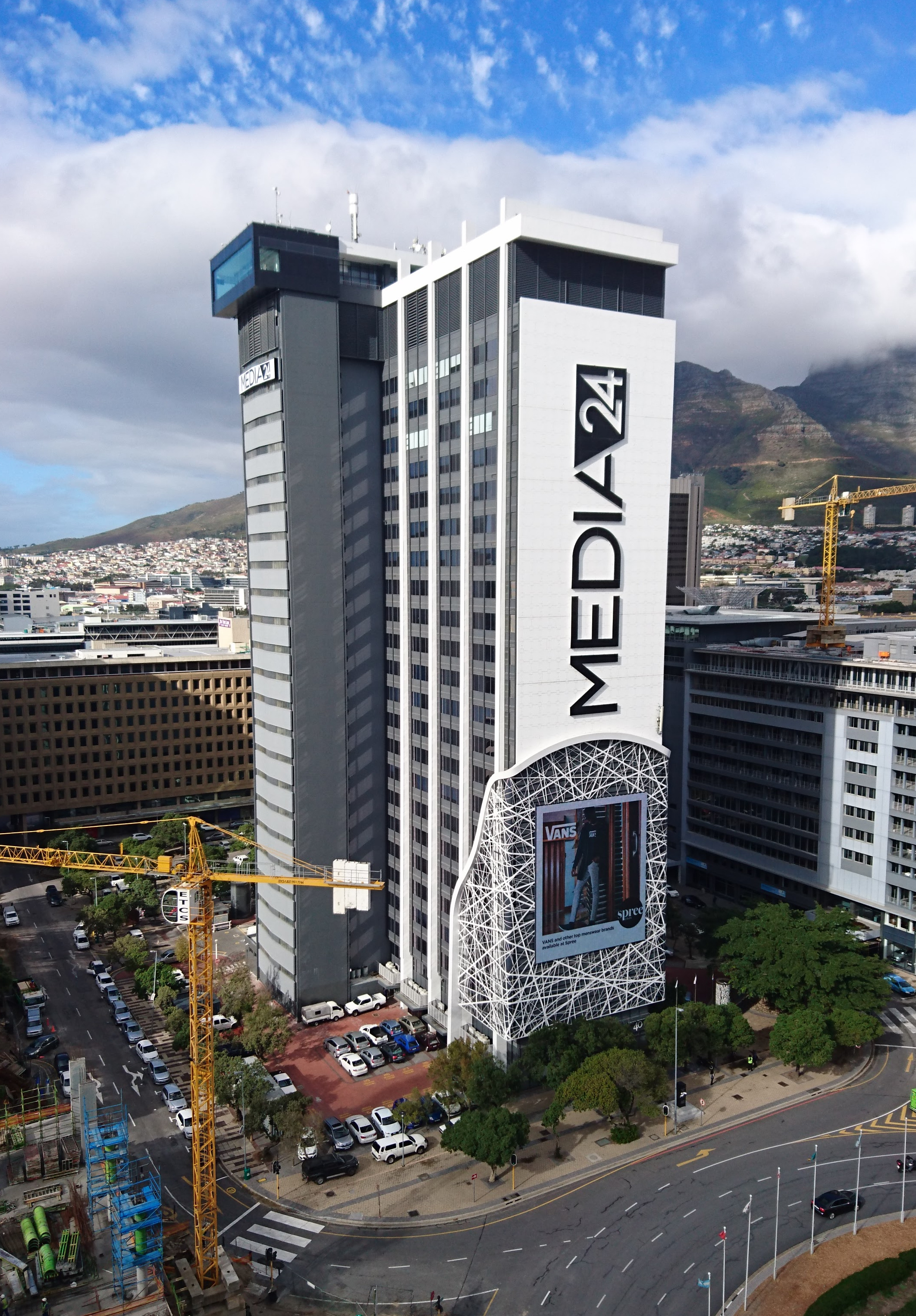
The Media24 Centre is the headquarters of Naspers, South Africa's largest mass media company, and the country's third-largest listed company by annual revenue

Cape Town is also home to the headquarters of South Africa's largest mass media corporation, and the country's third-largest listed company by annual revenue, Naspers. Located in the Media24 Centre, Naspers owns numerous national publications through its subsidiary, Media24. These include News24), as well as its Afrikaans sister publication, Netwerk24.

Other media companies headquartered in the city include business publication company Topco Media, print media holding company Novus Holdings, and magazine publisher Highbury Safika Media. The city also has a regional office for Primedia.

==== Film ====
The city has the largest film industry in the Southern Hemisphere generating R5 billion (US$476.19 million) in revenue and providing an estimated 6,058 direct and 2,502 indirect jobs in 2013. Much of the industry is based out of the Cape Town Film Studios.

==== Conferences ====
The Cape Town International Convention Centre (CTICC) hosts many local and international conferences and conventions

In recent years, Cape Town, has become a global conference hub, and a highly desirable place to host delegates for meetings. The Cape Town International Convention Centre (CTICC) in Cape Town's CBD hosts many large conferences throughout each year. The city has been increasing in popularity in this regard, and in June 2025, it was reported that Cape Town had reached 35th place globally in the International Congress and Convention Association's (ICCA) rankings of popular destinations for international association meetings.

The report highlighted that Cape Town hosted 58 such meetings in 2024, which constitutes 60% of the total hosted across South Africa that year. Cape Town also placed among the top 10 cities worldwide for average attendance per event, with an average of 717 delegates per meeting.

The Western Cape's official tourism, trade, and investment promotion agency, Wesgro, stated that Cape Town and the Western Cape Convention Bureau secured 36 new conference bids in the 2024/25 financial year alone. These events are expected to generate R745 million in economic impact, and attract over 27,000 delegates through to 2028.

In 2026, Cape Town was named Africa's Leading Meetings & Conference Destination at the World Travel Awards.

==== Renewable energy ====
The majority of South Africa's growing renewable energy industry is based in the Western Cape. Numerous domestic renewable energy companies are headquartered in Cape Town, including Charge, Rubicon, Treetops, SOLA Group, Anthem, Mulilo, Phelan Green Group, GreenCape, Red Rocket Energy, NOA Group, African Clean Energy Developments, and G7 Renewable Energies. Foreign renewable companies with regional HQs in Cape Town include ABO Energy, Acciona Energía, ACWA Power, EDF Renewables, Globeleq, JUWI, RES, and Mainstream Renewable Power.

All in all, 15 of SA's 23 major renewable energy independent power producers (IPPs), amounting to 65%, have their headquarters in Cape Town.

==== Real estate ====
Cape Town has the headquarters of numerous major South African real estate investment trusts (REITs) and other property investment firms. These include Equites, Stor-Age Property REIT, Spear REIT, FPG Property Fund, and Fairvest.

The Southern African office of RE/MAX is also in Cape Town.

==== Boat building ====
Cape Town has in recent years positioned itself as a notable player in the boat building industry. The city has become a regional hub for the sector, and is home to numerous boat building yards. Robertson and Caine, one of the world’s largest producers of luxury catamarans, is headquartered in the city, as is high-tech racing yacht company Cape Racing Yachts, and superyacht specialist Southern Wind. Cape Town is home to a skilled boat building workforce and a dedicated group of artisans in the industry, and the city produces more luxury catamarans than any other city in the world.

==== Tourism ====
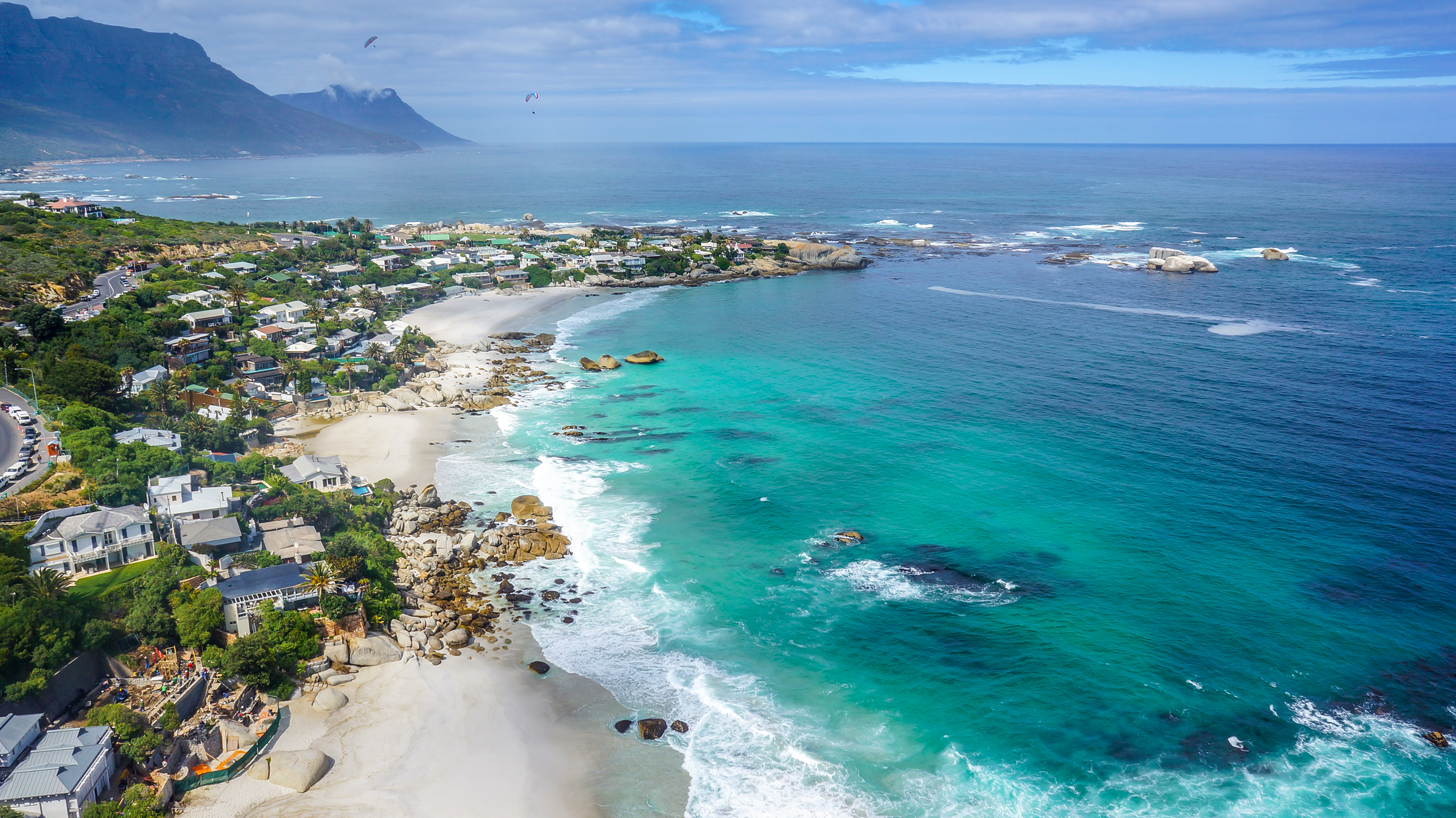
Clifton Beach is one of Cape Town's most famous beaches

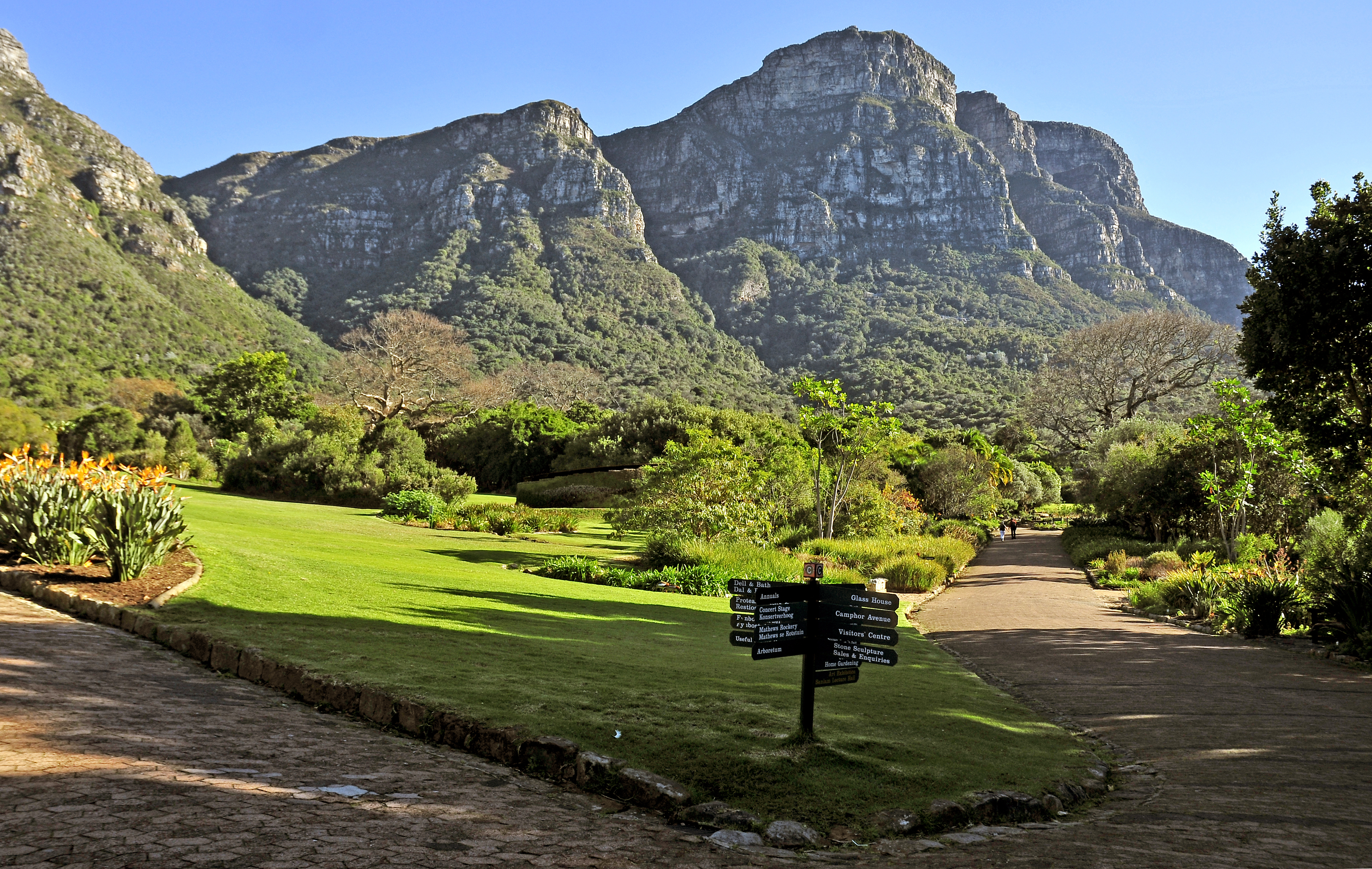
Table Mountain from the Kirstenbosch National Botanical Garden

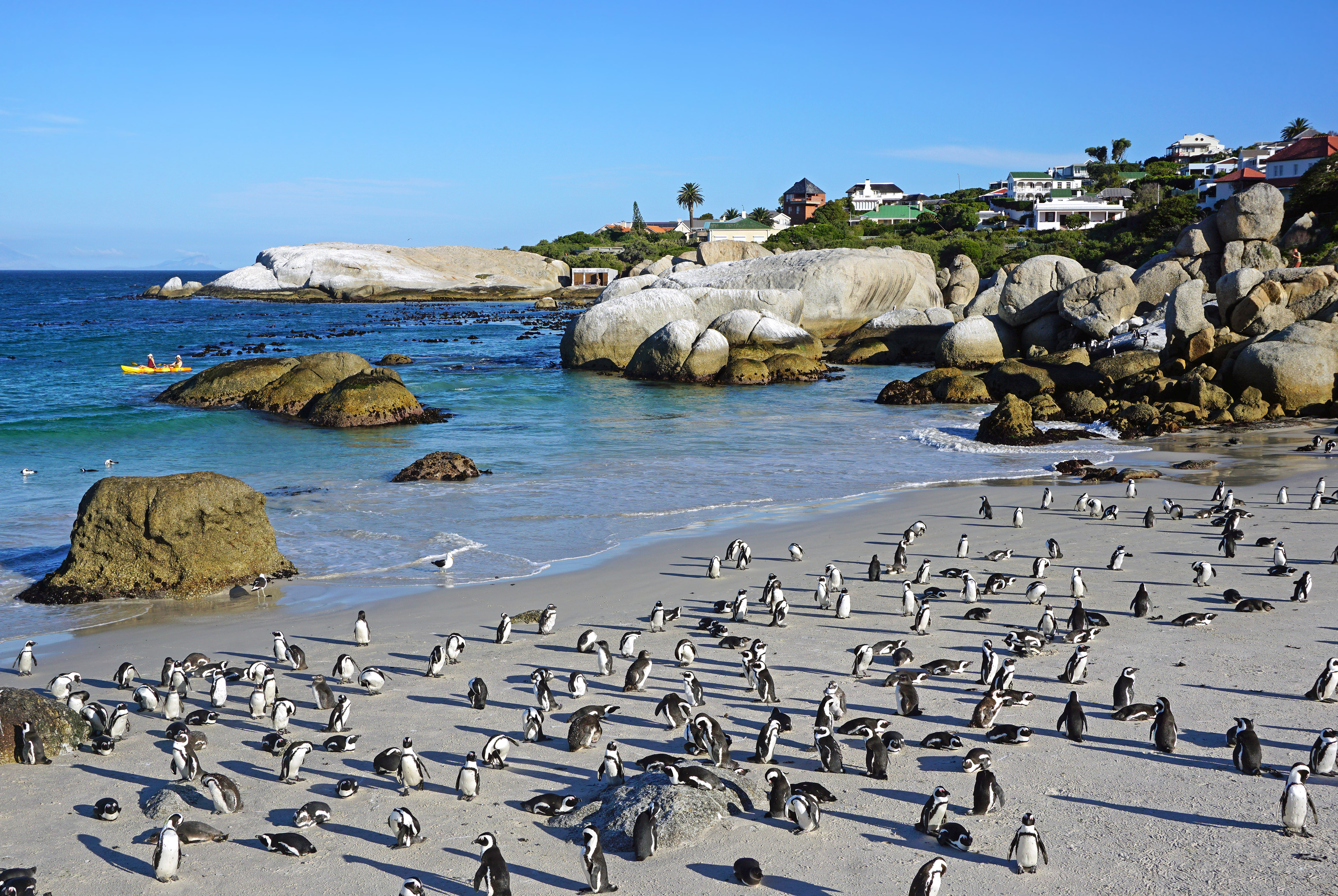
African penguins at Boulders Penguin Colony

The Western Cape is a highly important tourist region in South Africa; the tourism industry accounts for 9.8% of the GDP of the province and employs 9.6% of the province's workforce.

In 2024, Cape Town had its busiest tourist season ever. Over 2.4 million tourists visited the city, spending around R25 billion and supporting over 106,000 jobs (around 7% of the city's total employment). Cape Town is directly connected to 31 global destinations, with 226 international flights each week during its peak tourist season.

Cape Town is not only a popular international tourist destination in South Africa, but Africa as a whole. This is in part due to its mild climate, natural setting, costal geography, and well-developed infrastructure.

The city has several well-known natural features that attract tourists, most notably Table Mountain, which forms a large part of the Table Mountain National Park and is the back end of the City Bowl. Reaching the top of the mountain can be achieved either by hiking up, or by taking the Table Mountain Cableway. Cape Point is the dramatic headland at the end of the Cape Peninsula.

Many tourists also drive along Chapman's Peak Drive, a narrow road that links Noordhoek with Hout Bay, for the views of the Atlantic Ocean and nearby mountains. It is possible to either drive or hike up Signal Hill for closer views of the CBD, City Bowl area, and Table Mountain.

Tourists also commonly visit Cape Town's beaches, which are also very popular with local residents. It is possible to visit several different beaches in the same day, each with a different setting and atmosphere. Both coasts are popular, although the beaches in affluent Clifton and elsewhere on the Atlantic Coast are better developed, with restaurants and cafés lining Beach Road, alongside the various beaches.

The Atlantic Seaboard, known as Cape Town's Riviera, is regarded as one of the most scenic routes in South Africa; along the slopes of the Twelve Apostles to the boulders and white sand beaches of Llandudno, with the route ending in Hout Bay, a diverse suburb with a fishing and recreational boating harbour near a small island with a breeding colony of African fur seals.

Hout Bay is also accessible by road from the Constantia Valley, over the mountains to the northeast, and via the picturesque Chapman's Peak drive, from the residential suburb of Noordhoek, situated in the False Bay area to the south-east. Boulders Beach near Simon's Town is known for its colony of African penguins.

The city has a rich history, and several notable cultural attractions. Within Cape Town CBD there are the Artscape and District Six Homecoming Center theaters, The Houses of Parliament, the Iziko museums and Planetarium, the South African National Gallery, the Castle of Good Hope, and The Company's Garden (South Africa's oldest park). The CBD is also home to many coffeehouses, as well as numerous restaurants that provide a variety of local cuisine options.

The Victoria & Alfred Waterfront is a mixed-use development built on top of part of the docks of the Port of Cape Town, and is the city's most-visited tourist attraction. It is also one of the city's most popular shopping venues, with several hundred shops as well as the Two Oceans Aquarium.

The V&A also hosts the Nelson Mandela Gateway, through which ferries depart for Robben Island. It is possible to take a ferry from the V&A to Hout Bay, Simon's Town and the Cape fur seal colonies on Seal and Duiker Islands. Several companies offer tours of the Cape Flats, a region of mostly Coloured & Black townships.

Within the metropolitan area, the most popular areas for visitors to stay include Camps Bay, Sea Point, the V&A Waterfront, the CBD, Hout Bay, Constantia, Rondebosch, Newlands, and Somerset West. In November 2013, Cape Town was voted the best global city in The Daily Telegraph's annual Travel Awards.

Cape Town has also attracted international celebrities in connection with film and television productions. In the 2010s, American singer and actress Miley Cyrus visited several of the city's attraction while in South Africa filming an episode of Black Mirror. While American actor Jason Momoa and Israeli Gal Gadot discussed plans to visit and spend time in Cape Town, which they described as a new "hub for films". In the 2020s, British actor Idris Elba was spotted along Cape Town's shores and at the University of Cape Town while reportedly working with African creatives.

Cape Town offers tourists a range of air-, land-, and sea-based adventure activities, including helicopter rides, paragliding and skydiving, snorkelling and scuba diving, boat trips, game-fishing, hiking, mountain biking, and rock climbing. Surfing is popular in the city, along both coasts, and Cape Town hosts the Red Bull Big Wave Africa surfing competition every year. The city also has some local and international recreational scuba tourism.

The City of Cape Town works closely with Cape Town Tourism (CTT), the body tasked with promoting tourism in the city. Being the official destination marketing agency for Cape Town, CTT has a mandate from the city to advocate for and promote tourism in the Cape Town metropolitan area, to both local and foreign markets.

The primary focus of Cape Town Tourism is to represent and advocate for Cape Town as an appealing tourist destination, as well as to track and report on metrics related to tourism in Cape Town (which CTT does as part of its Annual Report, published online). Cape Town Tourism receives a portion of its funding from the City of Cape Town while the remainder is made up of membership fees and own-generated funds.

The Tristan da Cunha government owns and operates a lodging facility in Cape Town which charges discounted rates to Tristan da Cunha residents and non-resident natives. Cape Town's transport system links it to the rest of South Africa; it serves as the gateway to other destinations within the province. The Cape Winelands and in particular the towns of Stellenbosch, Paarl and Franschhoek are popular day trips from the city for sightseeing and wine tasting.

=== Other ===
Other local industries include insurance, publishing, design, fashion, shipping, petrochemicals, architecture, advertising, legal, and real estate.

Aside from fintech, numerous traditional financial firms are based in Cape Town, including Coronation Fund Managers, Ninety One Limited, Old Mutual, Sanlam, 10X Investments, Santam, Allan Gray, Sygnia, Foord, Camissa, and Taquanta.

Two of SA's largest food manufacturers, Pioneer Foods (which includes Bokomo products) and Oceana Group, are headquartered in Cape Town. A further two – Sea Harvest and I&J, have regional facilities in the city.

In terms of the oil and gas industry, Cape Town is home to the headquarters of Engen Petroleum and Astron Energy, South Africa's largest and second-largest gas station operators by number of locations. The country's second-largest oil refinery, the Astron Energy Refinery, is also based in Cape Town.

Companies headquartered in the city that are not covered in the dedicated industry sections above include Travelstart, Webafrica, MWEB, LIFT, Levi Strauss South Africa, PathCare, and Adidas South Africa.

The city is a manufacturing base for companies including Hisense, GlaxoSmithKline, Johnson & Johnson, and Kimberly-Clark.

Cape Town is also home to the Atlantis Special Economic Zone, an industrial area focused on green tech.

=== Inequality ===
The city of Cape Town's Gini coefficient of 0.58 is lower than South Africa's Gini coefficient of 0.7. This makes it more equal than the rest of the country, including any other major South African city, although still highly unequal by international standards.

Between 2001 and 2010 the city's Gini coefficient, a measure of inequality, improved by dropping from 0.59 in 2007 to 0.57 in 2010 only to increase to 0.58 by 2017.

== Housing ==
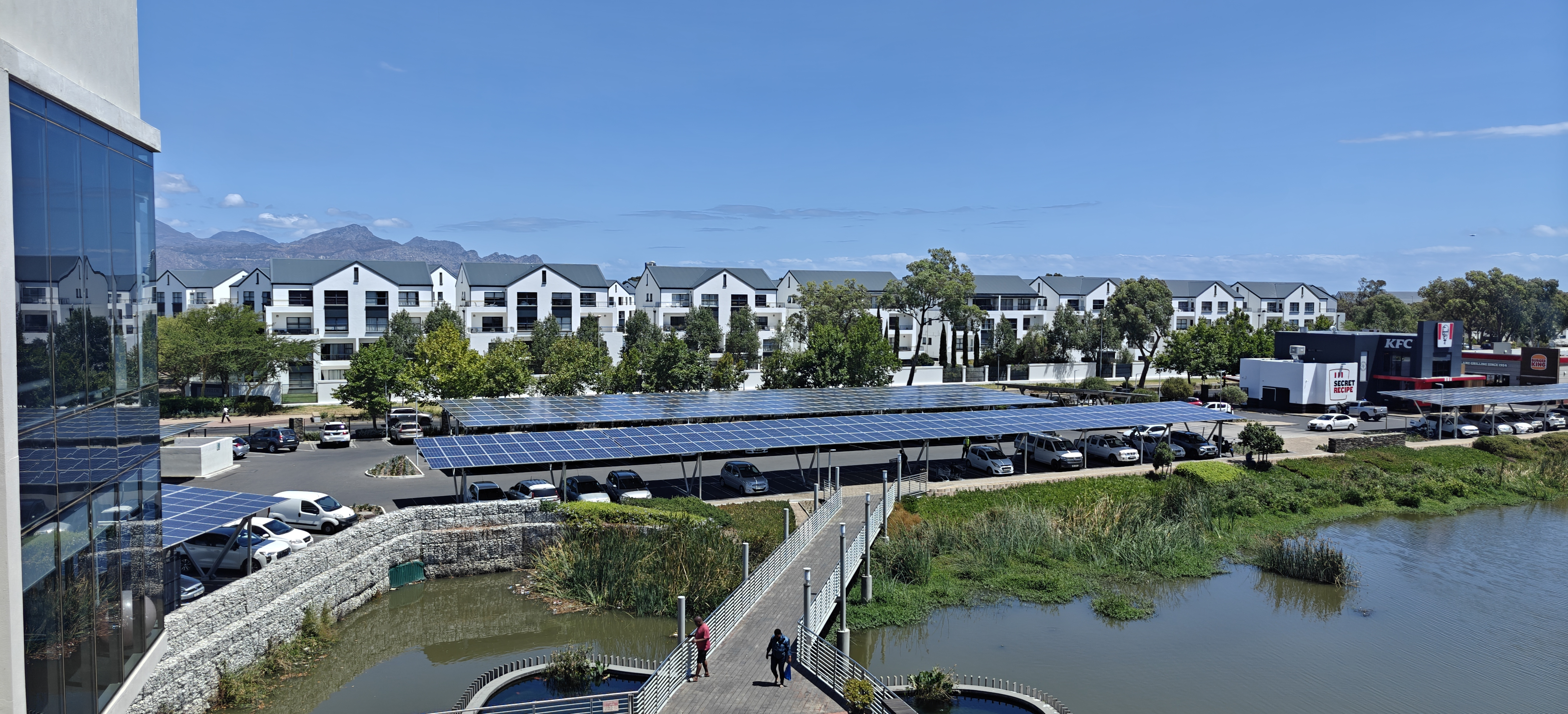
Modern, multi-story housing in Somerset West

Cape Town has a mix of detached homes of various sizes, townhouses, and apartments. Certain neighbourhoods (especially older ones and those in the Southern Suburbs) tend to be dominated by larger, detached houses on separate plots of land, with parks and tree-lined streets. Newer suburbs, and those in the Northern Suburbs, feature more of a mix of housing types, including low- and high-rise buildings and townhouse developments.

=== Home ownership ===
The city has for years had the most expensive average home price in South Africa. In September 2024, the average residential property price in Cape Town was R2.23 million. This was an increase of 36% from the average price of R1.63 million in 2014 (a decade before), indicating consistently strong returns on investment for those in the Cape Town property market. Sellers often get their asking price, or within 5% of it.

As of 2021, South Africa's upmarket real estate segment covered homes worth more than R1.5 million. Most of the country's high-value residential properties are located in the Western Cape, of which Cape Town is the capital.

Cape Town's property market grows at a rate far exceeding that of other major metropolitan areas in the country. For example, Statistics South Africa (Stats SA) reported that between January 2010 and November 2022, Cape Town property prices increased at around double the rate of those in Johannesburg. The city has been ranked as the world's second-strongest-performing real estate market.

This performance improved further in more recent years. In June 2025, it was reported in South Africa's Residential Property Price Index (RPPI) that Cape Town's property values had not only increased by significantly more than the national average, but had also increased by almost 4 times as much as second-place Johannesburg's.

To afford the average home in Cape Town, a salary of over R80,000 per month is required, which is significantly higher than in other provinces, and around 3 times the national average salary in South Africa. The Western Cape province in general requires far higher salaries for affording to purchase the average property than in other provinces.

Property in the Southern Suburbs offers a peaceful lifestyle and is generally more expensive, as is property in the Atlantic Seaboard area, for its ocean views, and property in the City Bowl region, for its proximity to Cape Town's CBD and amenities. Conversely, property in the Cape Flats is cheaper on average, as the region is less desirable to live in. The same goes for property in the Northern Suburbs region, where lower costs are as a result of living further from central Cape Town, and more space to build outwards (both inland and up the west coast).

Some suburbs in Cape Town have had exceptionally high property value growth in recent years. For example, in 2025, it was reported that Kalk Bay, an old fishing village in the False Bay area of Cape Town, had its house prices grow by around R1 million every year since 2020, due to an increase in demand for property in the Western Cape. The average price of a home in the suburb rose from R4.9 million in 2020 to R9 million at the start of 2025; an 83% increase over that 4-year period, or over 20% per year.

Likewise, the small town of Scarborough, which forms part of the City of Cape Town and is popular with foreign home buyers, saw a 241% increase in property values over a 9-year period, with average home values rising from R2.30 million in 2016 to R7.85 million in 2025. One reason for this kind of housing price growth in Cape Town is the local municipality's investments in maintaining and upgrading neighbourhoods, to create an attractive environment for residents to live in.

Property prices in Cape Town are around double the national average of R1.41 million, according to home loan statistics. In the fourth quarter of 2023, the national average home price recorded its second consecutive decrease. Meanwhile, Cape Town property prices have continued to increase.

Cape Town's property values increase on average around 10% per year. That figure was 11.5% year-over-year in January 2026. The consistently strong property prices and growth thereof can be attributed to numerous factors, including good service delivery by local government, a strong local economy, the coastal lifestyle that Capetonians enjoy, and semigration (individuals moving from other South African provinces into the Western Cape).

Cape Town trends among the top 20 cities worldwide for capital value growth, further increasing the attractiveness of owning a home in the city.

Cape Town housing is in short supply due to a number of issues, including NIMBYISM, delays in approvals for social housing, a lack of space to build outwards, and an increase in properties listed as short-term rentals on Airbnb and similar platforms. The negative impact of the unchecked growth of short-term rentals, such as Airbnbs, on the housing market was confirmed in January 2026 by South African Minister of Tourism Patricia de Lille. She stated that the primary solution was to build more affordable housing close to Cape Town CBD.

In February 2026, the City of Cape Town announced plans to significantly increase municipal rates for short-term rental properties, as part of combating low housing availability. The shift will result in short-term rentals, like those from Airbnb and Booking.com, being charged commercial tariffs instead of residential ones. This would increase their tariffs by as much as 135%, and put them in the same category that hotels and guest houses already are. As part of the announcement, the City stated it was correcting an imbalance in taxes, and that short-term rental operators should not be able to benefit from residential tariffs while running what is effectively a commercial business.

Despite not being the largest city in South Africa by population, Cape Town has built the highest number of affordable housing units, by a significant margin. During the period 1994 through 2025, the City of Cape Town constructed a total of 202,070 affordable housing units. In February 2026, it was reported that during the preceding five years, Cape Town had handed over a total of 12,401 affordable houses (equating to 2,480 per year). This was more affordable homes than the next two largest metros combined, and 152% more affordable homes than Johannesburg (a significantly larger city by population) handed over during the same period.

In early 2025, 14% of homes listed for sale were new to the market. The most common size of properties for sale was 2-bedroom, followed by 3-bedroom properties.

The city is home to some of South Africa's most expensive neighbourhoods, including Constantia and Bishopscourt in the Southern Suburbs; Tamboerskloof and Higgovale in the City Bowl; and Fresnaye, Camps Bay, Clifton, Llandudno, and Bantry Bay in the Atlantic Seaboard. Affluent areas are popular with international buyers from countries including the United Kingdom, the Netherlands, Germany, and France, with some purchasing homes around R60 million (~ £2.5 million / €3 million / US$3.3 million). 9 out of South Africa's 10 most expensive suburbs are in Cape Town.

In 2021, Cape Town's residential property market was valued at R1.22 trillion, the highest out of all major South African metropolitan areas. The city's property market constituted 72% of the entire Western Cape's residential property market value, and 21% of the national property market value. The city had significantly more homes valued in the luxury market segment (at 43% of the total) than in any other major South African metro area. In the same year, there were around 800,000 residential properties located in Cape Town. 76% of those were detached homes, 15% were apartments, and 9% were semi-detached homes.

As of April 2025, Cape Town had a home ownership rate of 6.6% among those aged 18 to 35; 22.7% among those aged 36 to 49; 35.7% for those aged 50 to 64; and 35% for those aged 65 or older. In the same month, 25.8% of new home buyers in Cape Town were aged 18 to 35.

=== Rentals ===
In 2025, the average rent price in Cape Town for a 2-bedroom apartment was approximately R12,000 per month. However, this value varies significantly between suburbs. For a property of the same size, some neighbourhoods offer rent as low as R7,000 per month, while in other, more desirable areas, this may be as high as R30,000 per month. The city has excellent gross rental yields, with some properties generating as much as a 10.5% return on investment for owners.

Rental prices for apartments in affluent areas can often exceed the city's average by multiples. For example, in 2024, three areas in the Atlantic Seaboard – Camps Bay, Clifton, and Bantry Bay – averaged rental prices of R40,000 per month for a 1-bedroom apartment, and R120,000 per month for a 3-bedroom apartment. In Cape Town, popular rental website Property24 lists almost 100 rentals per month at prices over R100,000 per month, and some rentals cost as much as R300,000 per month.

Average rent prices in Cape Town increased by 5.2% in 2025, in line with the national average. As of 2024, the city has the lowest rental vacancy rate out of all major South African metropolitan areas.

In 2021, approximately 18% of Cape Town residents rented their homes.

With nearly 5,000 students from over 100 countries studying at the University of Cape Town (UCT), 18% of the student body is international, which increases demand for rental properties in Cape Town. Student housing – accommodation provided by the University of Cape Town – has a shortfall, which is made up by the private rental market. In 2023, there were 28,000 registered UCT students, with 8,400 of them securing UCT residence places.

As of 2025, rental prices in the Western Cape were the highest in South Africa, and 23% above the national average. It has been the most expensive province in South Africa for renting since 2016. The Western Cape's reputation as South Africa's best-run province, with efficient governance and high-quality, well-maintained infrastructure, has made it an attractive destination for tenants.

The average rent price in the Western Cape in the fourth quarter of 2024 was R11,141. This was the first time the figure had gone beyond the R11,000 mark. The Western Cape also has the lowest number of tenants in arrears (those who are behind on rental payments) out of all South African provinces. The Western Cape had a record-low vacancy rate of 1.07% in the third quarter of 2024.

== Infrastructure and services ==
The City of Cape Town has a strong focus and high level of spending on infrastructure development and maintenance. The City spent a total of R9.5 billion on infrastructure development during the 2024 to 2025 financial year. For the 2025 to 2026 financial year, the city's budget was R12.6 billion. Its total spend ended up being R12.24 billion – the highest single year infrastructure investment spend for a city in South Africa's history. In the same year, the City apportioned R120 billion for its 10-year infrastructure portfolio. Cape Town has a larger infrastructure budget than the combined budgets of all three metropolitan areas in the province of Gauteng.

Most goods are handled through the Port of Cape Town or Cape Town International Airport. Most major shipbuilding companies have offices in Cape Town. The province is also a centre of energy development for the country, with the existing Koeberg nuclear power station providing energy for the Western Cape's needs.

Cape Town has five major commercial nodes, with the city's CBD containing around 40% of its office space. Century City, the Bellville/Tygervalley strip, Westlake, and Claremont commercial nodes are well-established and contain many offices and corporate headquarters, for both local and international companies.

Cape Town's property investment and construction markets consistently perform well above its metropolitan peers in South Africa.

In September 2025, the City implemented new planning rules for property development that reduce approval times. Through its Municipal Planning Amendment by-law, costs for developers, and by extension buyers, are reduced. Furthermore, opportunities opened up for small-scale developers to build up to 12 affordable rental units on certain residential plots, without the need to go through a rezoning process, thereby speeding up the building of affordable housing in Cape Town. The City stated that it was also investigating the use of artificial intelligence (AI) to process future development applications.

=== Telecommunications ===
Cape Town has a well-established telecoms infrastructure network, which includes:

- Fibre to the premises for residential and commercial buildings. Fibre network operators (FNOs) like Vumatel, Frogfoot, and Octotel, provide connectivity as high as 1 Gbit/s, with a separate 1 Gbit/s redundant line, to homes and business premises. These services also provide optional VoIP connectivity.
  - The city derives its main undersea connectivity from West African cable routes, such as WACS, Equiano, and SACS, as well as Pan African cables like 2africa. Many of these land at either Yzerfontein, around 2 hours from Cape Town, or Melkbosstrand, just to the north of the city.
- 5G and 4G cellular networks, with coverage in almost all areas of the metro region, from major providers such as Vodacom, MTN, and Cell C, as well as options from MVNOs like Rain.

=== Health ===
The city contains many well-equipped clinics and hospitals in both the public and private healthcare sectors.

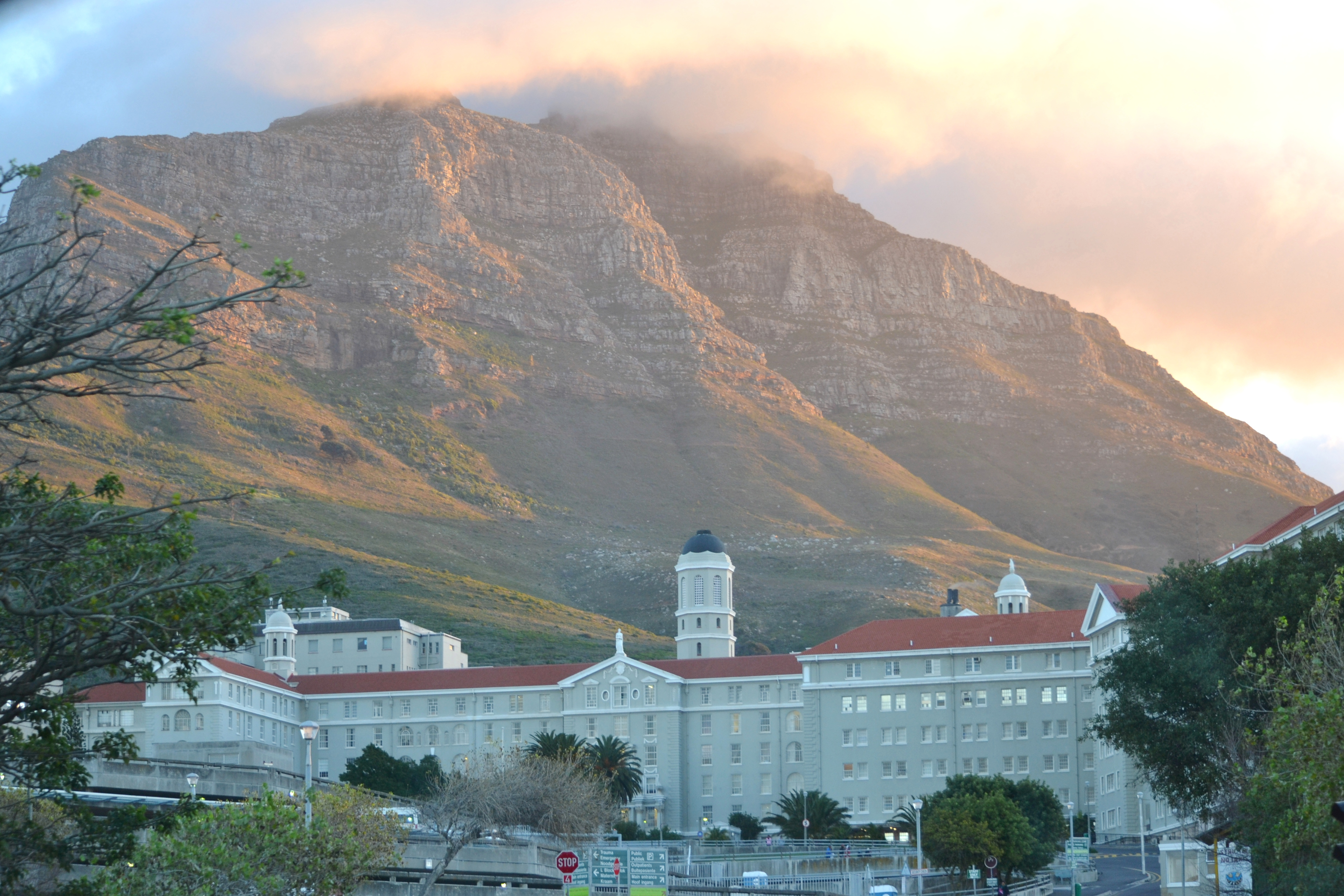
Groote Schuur Hospital

- The Alexandra Hospital is a specialist mental health care hospital in Cape Town. It provides care for complex mental health issues and intellectual disability.
- Groote Schuur Hospital is a large, government-funded, teaching hospital situated on the slopes of Devil's Peak. It was founded in 1938 and is famous for being the institution where the first human-to-human heart transplant took place. Groote Schuur is the chief academic hospital of the University of Cape Town's medical school, providing tertiary care and instruction in all the major branches of medicine. The hospital underwent major extension in 1984 when two new wings were added.
- Helderberg Hospital is a district hospital for the Helderberg basin. Located in Somerset West, it also serves surrounding areas in the Overberg district.

Numerous of South Africa's major private medical services groups operate hospitals in the city, including those below.

- Mediclinic Group: 7 facilities (Cape Town, Milnerton, Louis Leipoldt, Constantiaberg, Cape Gate, Durbanville, and Vergelegen)
- Netcare: 4 facilities (Christiaan Barnard, UCT Private Academic, Blaawberg, and N1 City)
- Melomed: 5 facilities (Gatesville, Bellville, Tokai, Mitchells Plain, and Claremont)
- Life Healthcare Group: 3 facilities (Kingsbury, Vincent Pallotti, and Sports Science)

=== Education ===
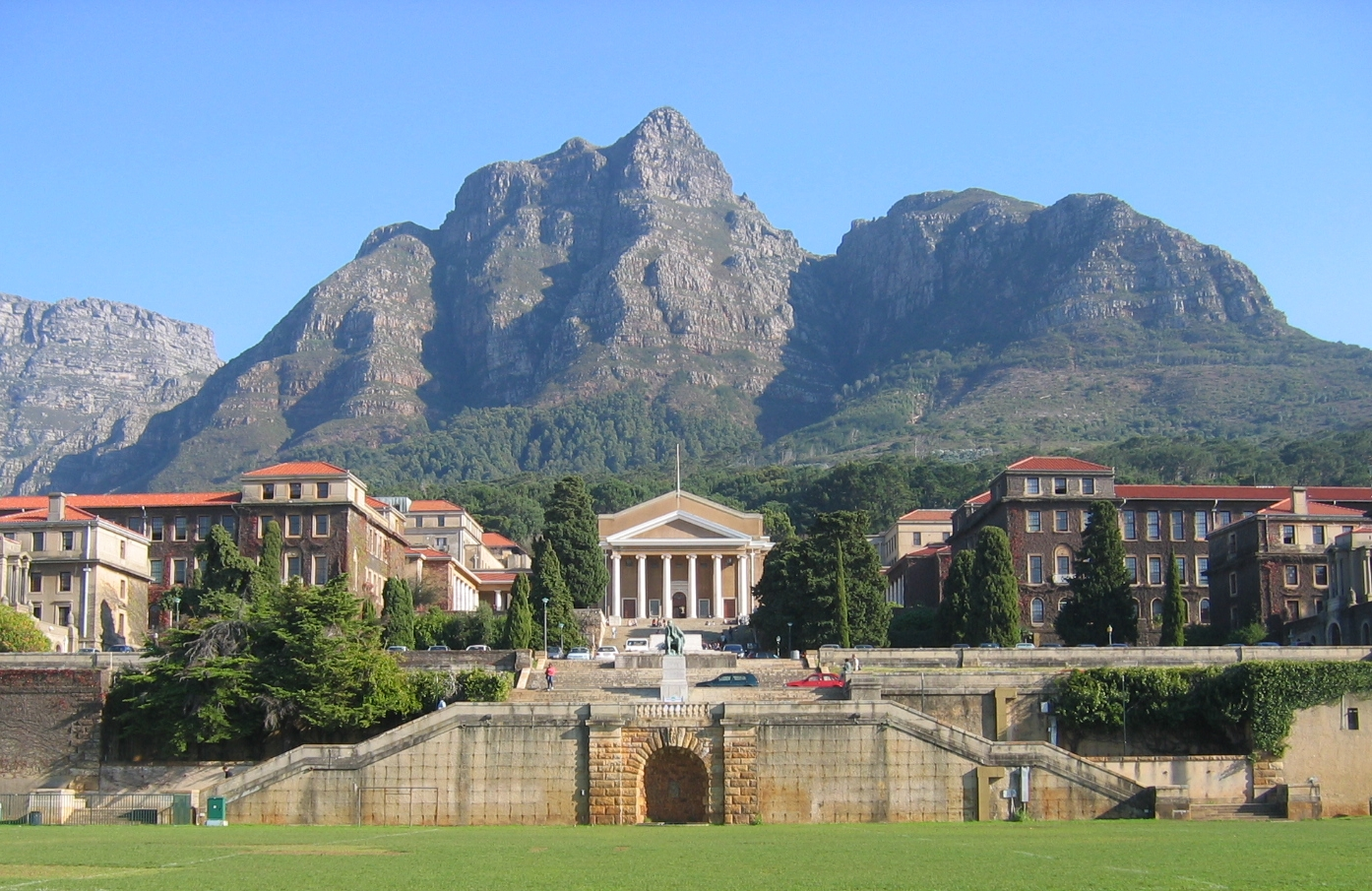
The University of Cape Town's Upper Campus, in front of Devil's Peak

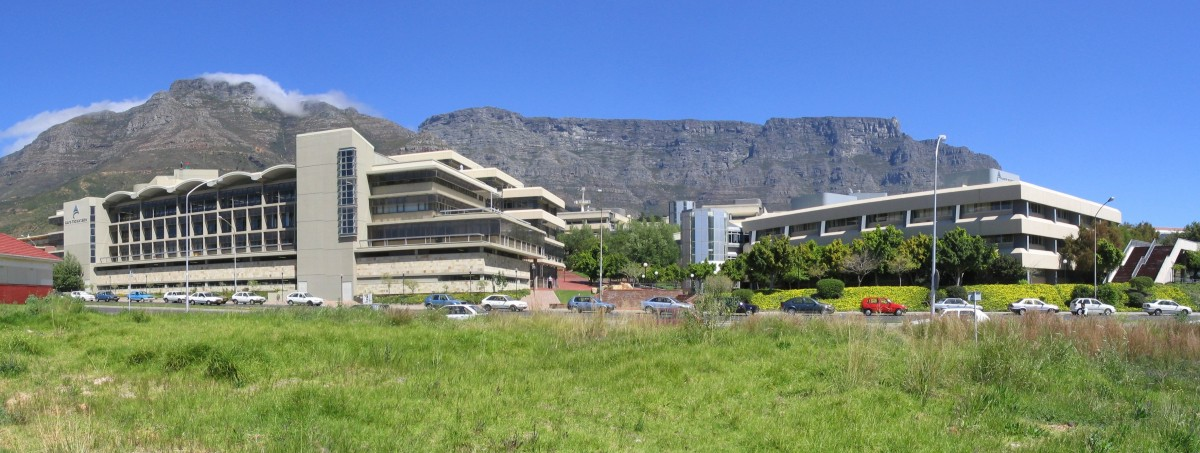
The Cape Town Campus of the Cape Peninsula University of Technology, with Table Mountain in the background

Public primary and secondary schools in Cape Town are run by the Western Cape Education Department. This provincial department is divided into seven districts; four of these are "Metropole" districts – Metropole Central, North, South, and East – which cover various areas of the metropolis. There are also many private schools, both religious and secular. Cape Town has a well-developed higher system of public universities.

Cape Town is served by three public universities: the University of Cape Town (UCT), the University of the Western Cape (UWC) and the Cape Peninsula University of Technology (CPUT). Stellenbosch University, while not based in the metropolitan area itself, has its main campus and administrative section 50 kilometers from Cape Town, and has additional campuses, such as the Tygerberg Faculty of Medicine and Health Sciences and the Bellville Business Park, north-west of the city in the town of Bellville.

Both the University of Cape Town and Stellenbosch University are leading universities in South Africa. This is due in large part to substantial financial contributions made to these institutions by both the public and private sector.

UCT is an English language tuition institution. It has over 21,000 students and has an MBA program that was ranked 51st by the Financial Times in 2006.

It is also the top-ranked university in Africa, being the only African university to make the world's Top 200 university list at number 146. UCT has its main campus on the mountainside in Rondebosch, a predominantly residential suburb in the Southern Suburbs region of Cape Town. The university also operates satellite campuses in Observatory and Cape Town CBD.

Since the African National Congress has become the country's ruling party, some restructuring of Western Cape universities has taken place and as such, traditionally non-white universities have seen increased financing, which has evidently benefitted UWC.

The Cape Peninsula University of Technology was formed on 1 January 2005, when two separate institutions – Cape Technikon and Peninsula Technikon – were merged. The new university offers education primarily in English, although one may take courses in any of South Africa's official languages. The institution generally awards the National Diploma.

Students from the universities and high schools are involved in the South African branch of SEDS (Students for the Exploration and Development of Space). There are many SEDS branches in other countries, preparing enthusiastic students and young professionals for the growing Space industry.

As well as the universities, there are also several colleges in and around Cape Town. Including the College of Cape Town, False Bay College and Northlink College. Many students use NSFAS funding to help pay for tertiary education at these TVET colleges. Cape Town has also become a popular study abroad destination for many international college students. Many study abroad providers offer semester, summer, short-term, and internship programs in partnership with Cape Town universities as a chance for international students to gain intercultural understanding.

=== Safety and security ===
Cape Town has multiple law enforcement agencies working together to ensure the laws of South Africa, as well as the provincial and municipal bylaws, are upheld throughout the city. Different agencies have different jurisdictions, granted to them by various levels of government. In recent years, the City of Cape Town and Western Cape province have been pushing to gain more independence from the South African Police Service, and to instead have full control of their policing.

In recent years, the city has taken a focused approach towards combatting crime, investing in technological interventions such as dash and body cameras, CCTV, and drones. The Western Cape's Department of Police Oversight and Community Safety had an annual budget in 2024 of around R800 million, a large portion of which goes to Cape Town. Likewise, the City of Cape Town's Safety and Security Directorate has a healthy annual budget, which totaled around half a billion rand for the 2024 fiscal year.

Cape Town's law enforcement is overseen by the city's Mayco Member for Safety and Security, the Western Cape Community Safety and Police Oversight MEC, and the Western Cape Police Commissioner.

The agencies working to ensure safety and security in the City of Cape Town are:

==== The Cape Town Metropolitan Police Department (Metro Police) ====
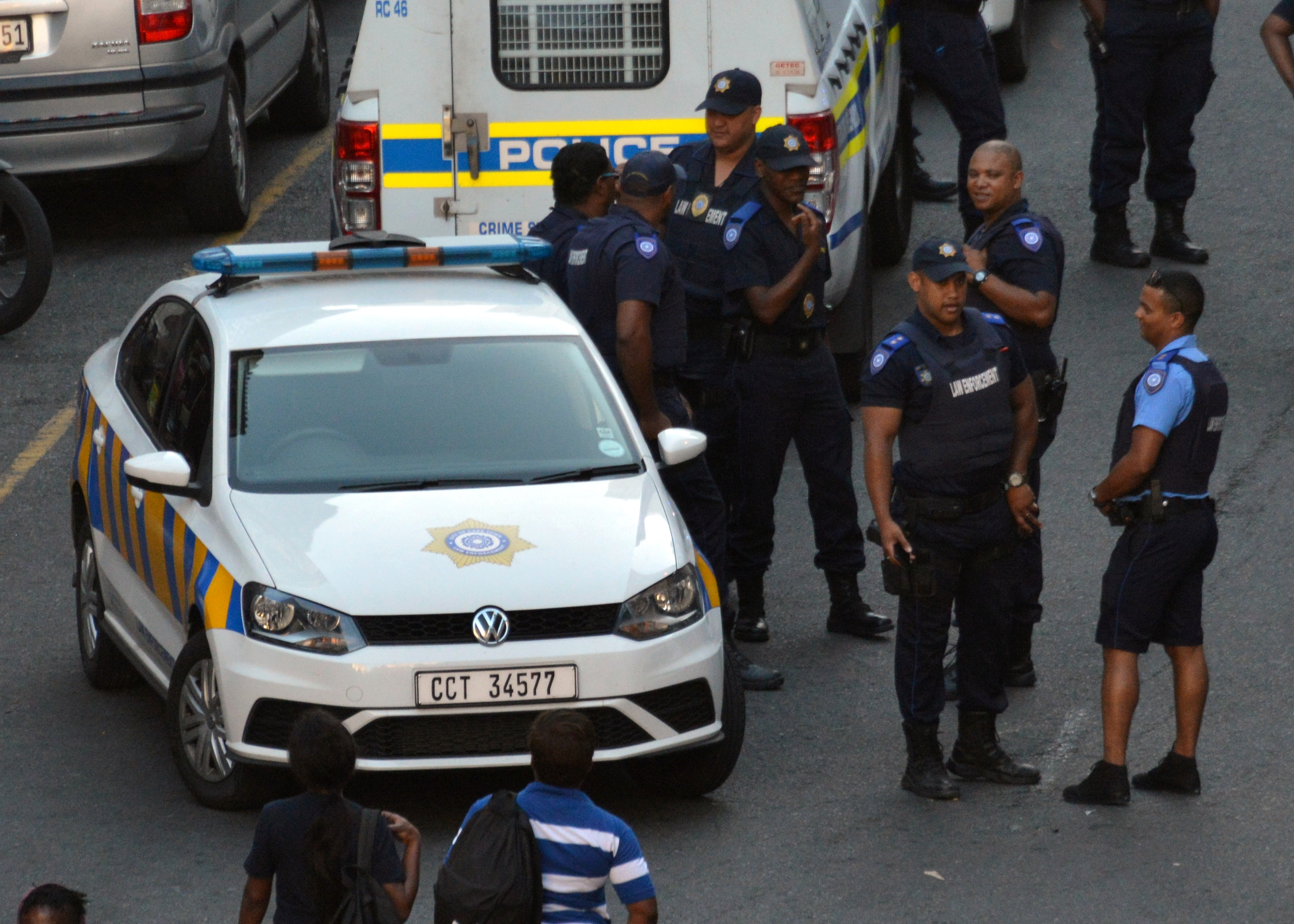
Cape Town Metro Police officers and a Metro Police vehicle

The Metro Police are responsible for crime prevention, as well as the enforcement of municipal bylaws and traffic laws, conducting autonomous drug- and alcohol-related operations, executing warrants in support of the South African Police Service, and conducting visible policing in specific areas. Its special units include:

- Gang and Drug Task Team
- Tactical Response Unit
- Canine Unit
- Equestrian Unit
- Camera Response Unit
- Video Unit
- CCTV Unit
- Social Crime Prevention Unit

In mid-2025, Cape Town rolled out its Neighbourhood Safety Officer (NSO) program. Part of the Metro Police, NSOs are officers dedicated to patrolling specific neighbourhoods across the city. On top of other kinds of law enforcement, the program positions 5 dedicated NSOs per City of Cape Town municipal ward.

The Metro Police make use of vehicles including the Toyota Corolla for general law enforcement, the Volkswagen Golf GTI for the Flying Squad, and the Toyota Fortuner for the Highway Patrol.

==== Traffic Service ====
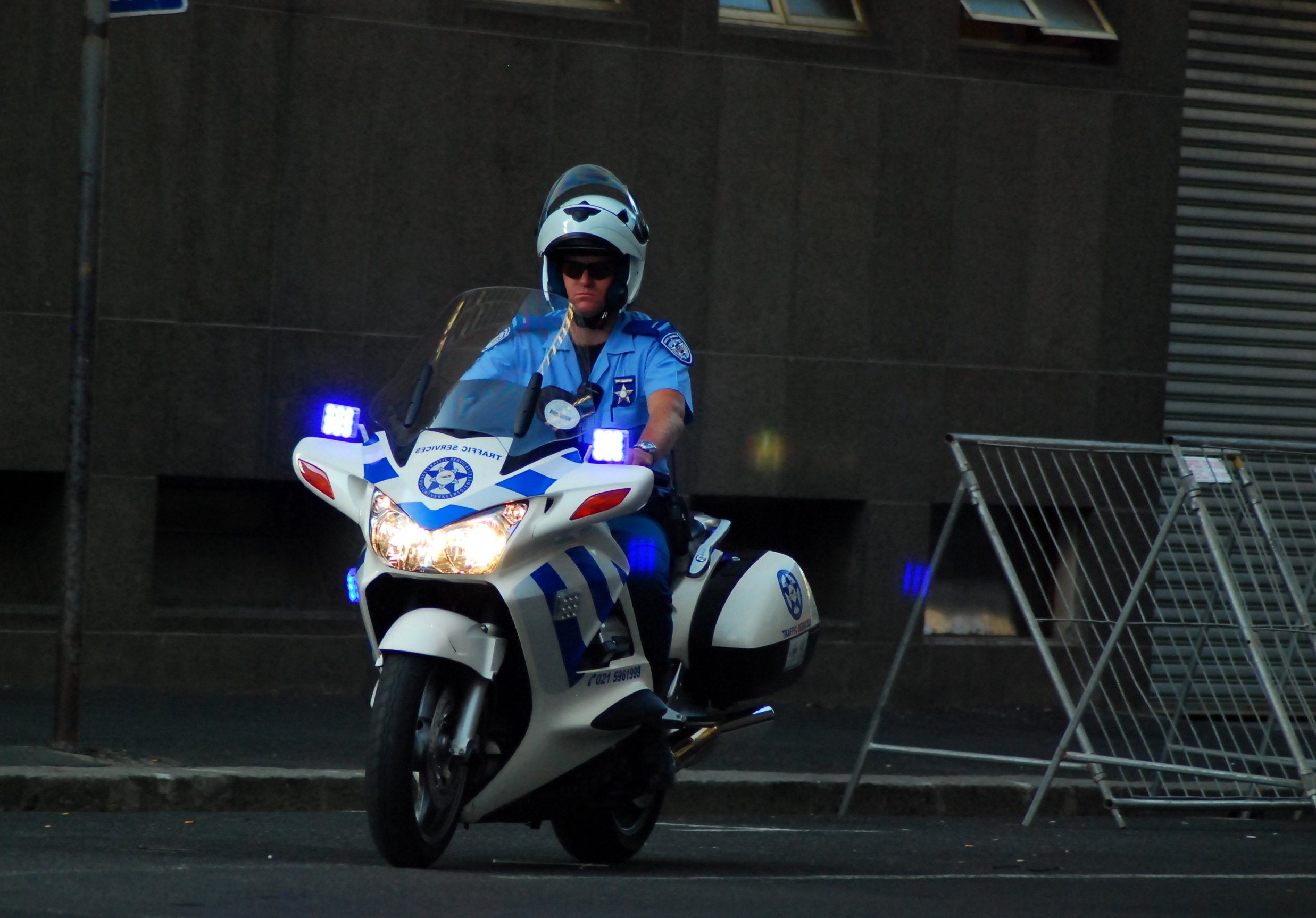
Cape Town Traffic Service officer on a motorbike in the V&A Waterfront

The city's Traffic Service has dedicated officers for improving road safety by providing effective driving license services and traffic enforcement. The Service employs specially trained peace officers.

While Metro Police can and do also provide traffic-related enforcement, the Traffic Service focuses entirely on such. Cape Town's Traffic Service enforces traffic laws, ensures roadworthy compliance of all motor vehicles, and provides driving license services. Matters it deals with include drunk driving offenses, vehicle impounds, animal impounds, displaced people, graffiti enforcement, informal trading, liquor enforcement, metal theft, rail enforcement, and neighbourhood safety.

Traffic Services began using dashboard-mounted cameras (dashcams) in 2023, for added security. Cape Town's Traffic Services operates a specialized Highway Patrol unit, with its own fleet of vehicles that are geared towards maintaining safety on the highways passing through the city.

==== Law Enforcement Advancement Plan (LEAP) ====
LEAP officers are specifically deployed in high-crime areas. They undergo separate training, and exist as an entirely separate police force to Metro Police. However, they work closely with Metro Police, as well as SAPS.

LEAP officers deal with matters including the confiscation of illegal firearms, violence prevention, drug and liquor confiscations, and anti-gang activities.

The City of Cape Town partnered with the Western Cape Government to launch LEAP in 2020, as part of the latter's Western Cape Safety Plan (WCSP), which was launched in September 2019.

==== The South African Police Service (SAPS) ====
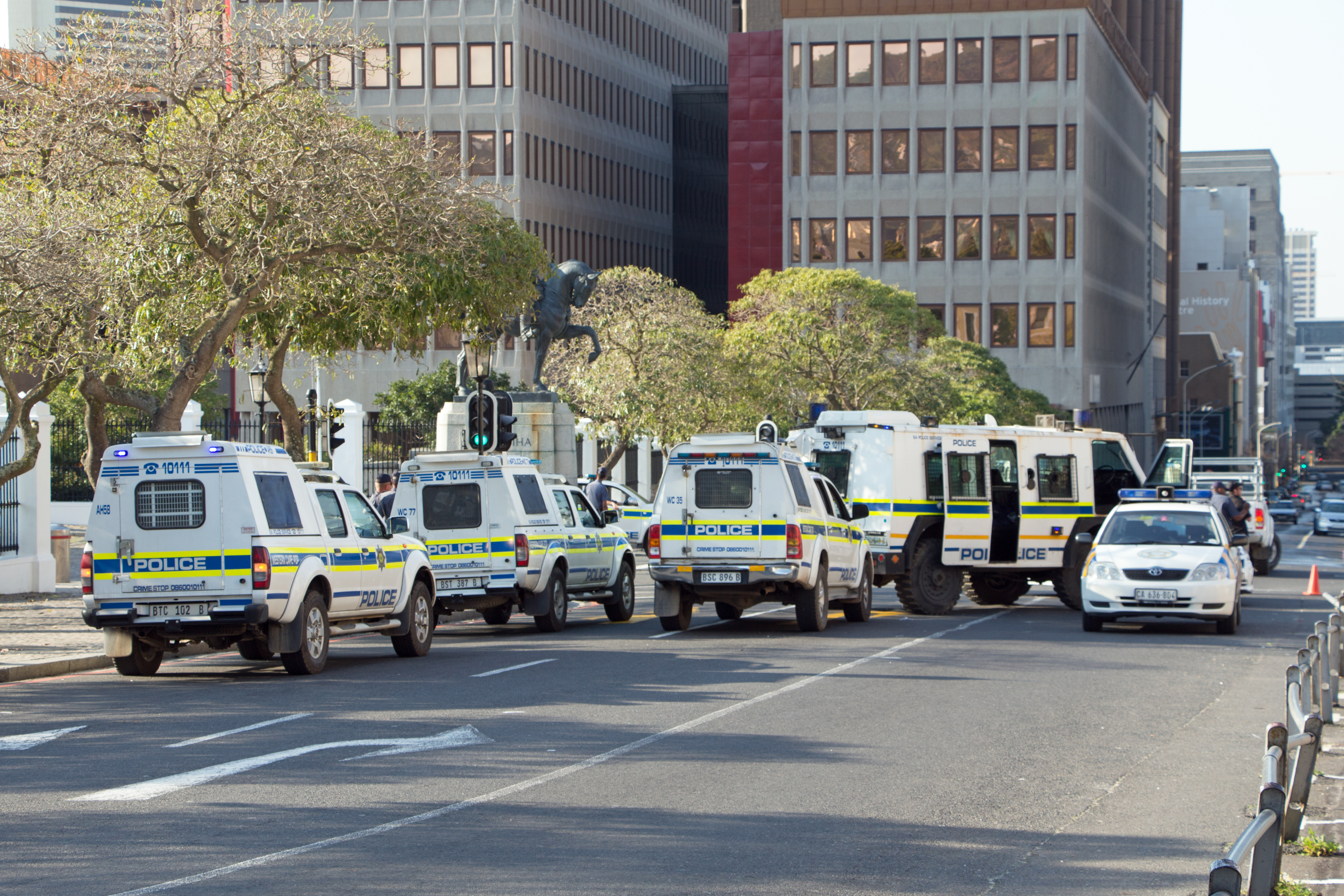
SAPS vehicles outside the main entrance to Parliament, in the center of Cape Town CBD

SAPS is the national policing authority in South Africa. As such, they have a presence in Cape Town, as with all other major metropolitan areas. Their jurisdiction covers the investigation of crimes (which may be handed over to them by the Metro Police). SAPS employs detectives, criminologists, forensic pathologists, and other related experts, as is governed by the Department of Police in the national government.

SAPS, along with Metro Police members, are held accountable by the Independent Police Investigative Directorate, which investigates wrongdoing within the police service across South Africa.

In the City of Cape Town, SAPS makes use of vehicles including the Toyota Hilux, Toyota Fortuner, and Nissan Navara.

In early 2025, the City of Cape Town announced its intention to merge numerous police forces info a single law enforcement agency.

==== Improvement Districts ====
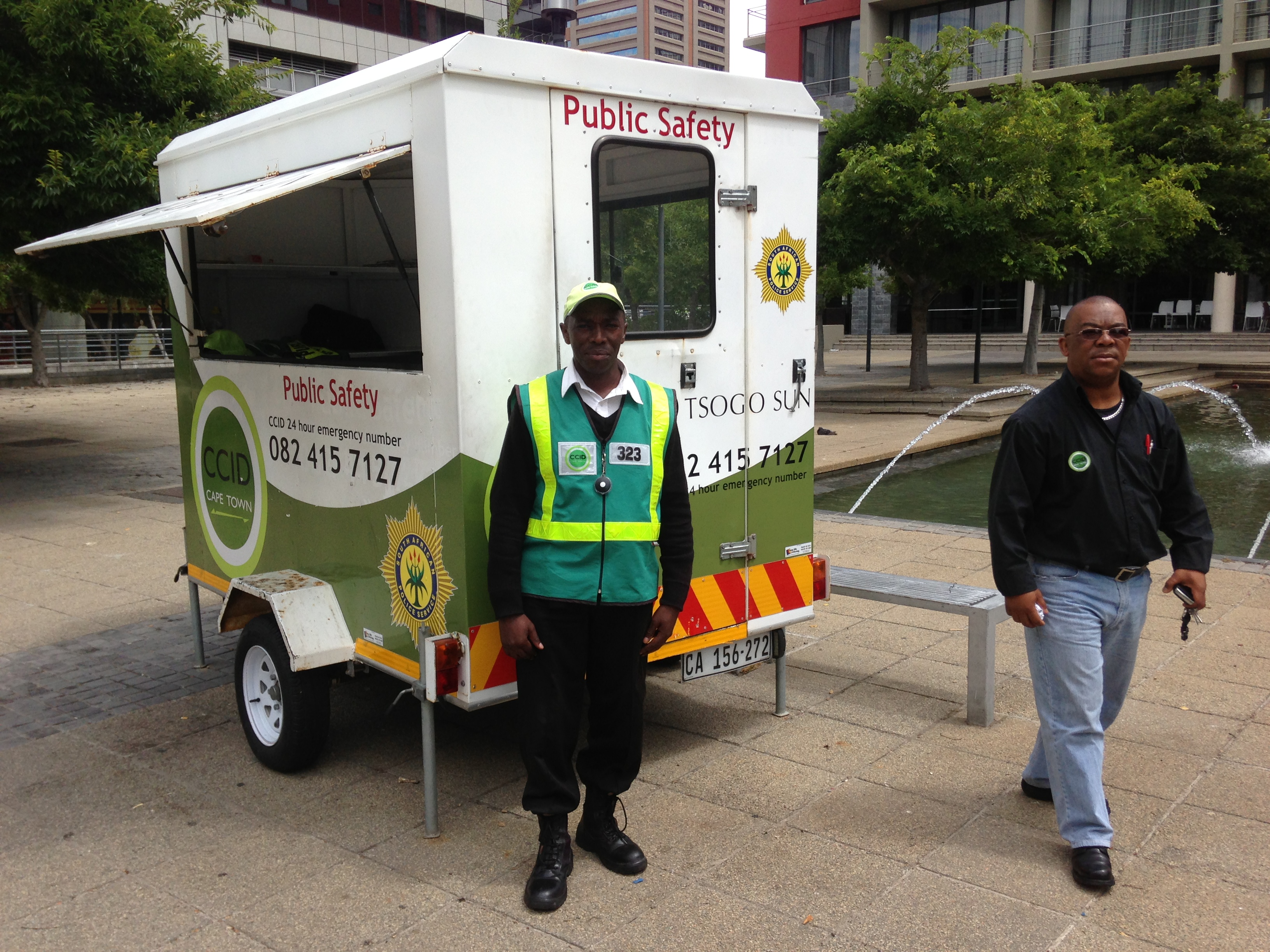
A CCID trailer, guard and manager in the city centre providing additional security to the local area.

Ratepayers in Cape Town fund a number Business Improvement Districts (BID) across the city with the assistance of the City of Cape Town. As of 2025 there were 21 BIDs funded by local ratepayers across the city to provide localised supplementary urban management, communications, and social development services in their respective areas.

The largest and oldest such district is the Cape Town Central City Improvement District (CCID), founded in 2000. CCID focuses on a roughly 1.6 sqkm area in Cape Town CBD, the city's main economic hub. The CCID also employs 12 dedicated Law Enforcement officers to assist with arrests. It is able to obtain access to the City of Cape Town's Strategic Surveillance Unit (SSU) CCTV cameras, to assist with crime prevention efforts.

The presence of BIDs like the CCID has been credited with significantly contributing to the general safety and prosperity of the city.

==== Law Enforcement Auxiliary Service (LEAS) ====
Cape Town's Law Enforcement Auxiliary Service (LEAS) has been operating since 2013, as part of the city's overall public safety program. LEAS comprises around 300 individuals, who volunteer for a minimum of 16 hours per month. LEAS volunteers operate under the supervision of permanent law enforcement officers. Uniformed LEAS officers assist with duties including patrolling (visible policing), enforcing municipal bylaws, and directing traffic. Non-uniformed officers assist with administrative tasks relating to law enforcement.

LEAS officers undergo thorough vetting, are divided up between the 4 geographical areas within the metro, and are supported by an Auxiliary Animal Control Unit, Marine Unit, and Rural Safety Unit.

==== Other security measures ====
The City of Cape Town's Strategic Surveillance Unit (SSU), uses a system of around 2,000 closed circuit television (CCTV) cameras throughout the metropolitan area, monitoring suburbs for any suspicious activity, and using CCTV footage in the prosecution of crimes. The CCTV network is used by, among other agencies, Metro Police, LEAP, and SAPS (including for investigations). Control room staff for the CCTV network are able to rapidly deploy response teams, ranging from police to emergency services, based on the events occurring. The cameras are therefore useful not only for crime prevention, but also general public safety.

CCTV camera budgeting falls under the allocations of the Safety and Security Directorate, which also deploys communications equipment for various Cape Town neighbourhood watch organizations. The city's CCTV Cameras are also used for license plate recognition, by means of Automated Number Plate Recognition (ANPR) software. This is used by units including the city's Highway Patrol. In 2019, the City spent around R20 million on upgrading this system and purchasing new security vehicles.

Since 2024, Cape Town has also made use of its Eye in the Sky (Eye) Information, Surveillance, and Reconnaissance initiative – an advanced, drone-based aerial technology system designed to provide real-time monitoring of activities on the ground. Forming part of a broader push to integrate surveillance technologies into public safety and urban governance, Eye's unmanned aerial vehicles (UAVs) have been specially designed for fighting crime, and are considerably advanced as a result.

The drones are equipped with infrared cameras, and can detect body heat in cold water, trace residual heat from discharged firearms, and capture the thermal signatures of high-speed vehicles. Furthermore, the drones can fly at very high altitudes, operate for long periods of time, and function in adverse weather conditions.

The City uses similar drones for environmental issues, such as mountain fires and illegal marine poaching. Cape Town's Eye drones deliver high-resolution, real-time intelligence to the city's security agencies and emergency response teams, forming an integral part of the city's overall safety and security operations.

Other forms of technology added recently to the city's safety and security arsenal include dashboard-mounted Automated Number Plate Recognition cameras, bodycams for police officers, gunshot detection systems for remote alerts, and handheld digital devices which are linked to the city's Emergency Policing Incident Control (EPIC) system, for fast-tracked incident logging, issuing of fines, and uploading of photographic evidence. Cape Town continues to modernize its policing systems, and in recent years, has spent over R600 million on technological advancements in the security space.

Many Cape Town residents have access to additional security in the form of private security subscriptions, from the likes of large companies (with national reach), such as Fidelity ADT. These companies provide armed response teams for residential crime reduction, with private security personnel and vehicles also being stationed around Cape Town neighbourhoods for visible, localized security. ADT also partners with major South African fibre network operator (FNO) Vumatel, to monitor areas via CCTV, and some suburbs' residents have arranged for cameras to be installed around their houses for 24/7 surveillance, to increase local security.

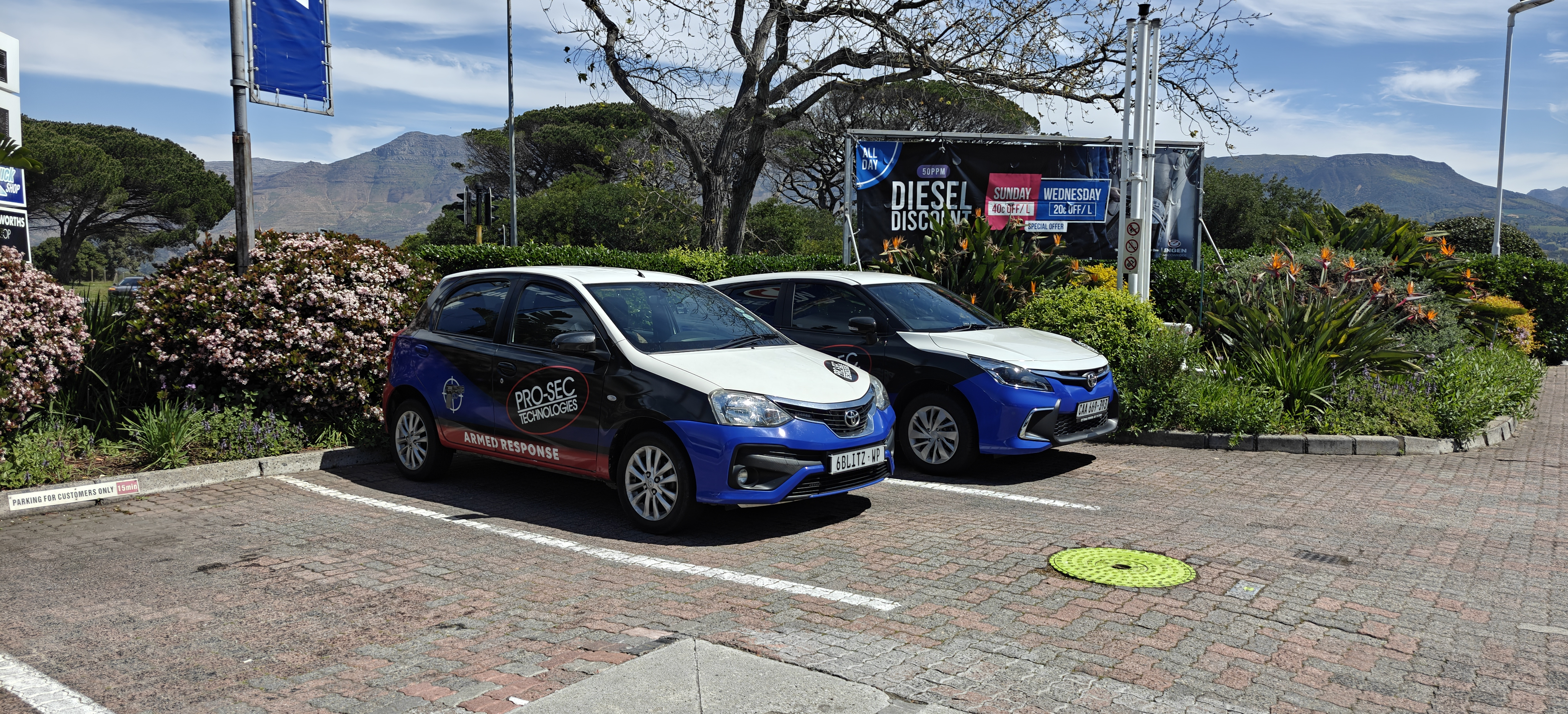
Private security vehicles in Meadowridge, Cape Town

The city is part of the Public Emergency Call Center (107) network, for crime reporting and response.

Cape Town has been a pioneer with policing and security innovations in South Africa. The City runs the country's only police reservist service that is managed by a local government, in the form of the Disaster Volunteers, and the Law Enforcement Auxiliary Service. It was also first to launch specialized policing units including the Gang and Drug Task Team, and the Metal Theft Unit.

The city is also the only metropolitan area in South Africa to use gunfire detection systems in high-risk areas, and to effectively implement computer-aided dispatch and integrated spatially enabled resource management through its award-winning EPIC system. Furthermore, Cape Town employs the largest CCTV network out of all South African cities.

=== Energy supply ===
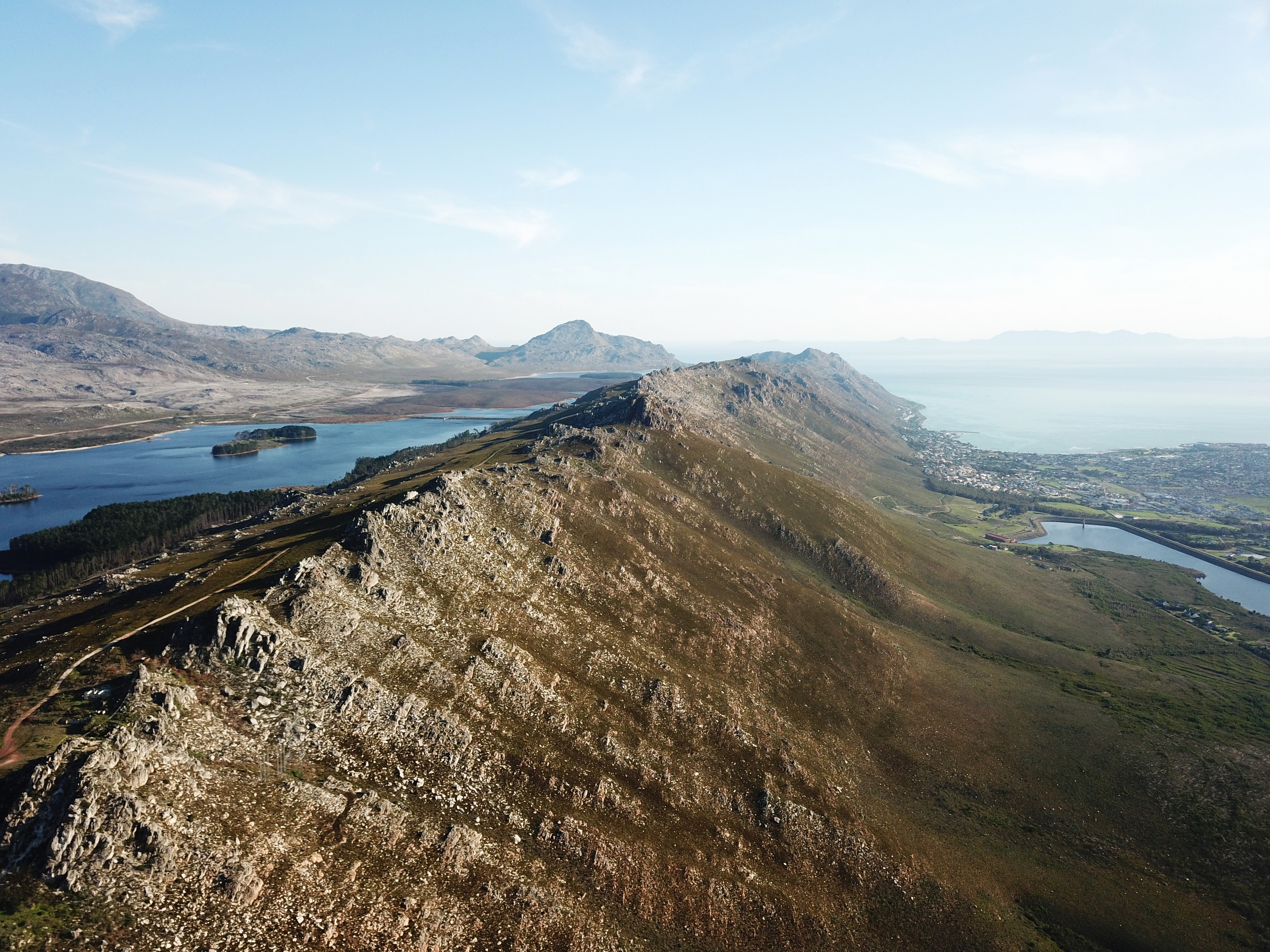
The Steenbras Dam, which is used to generate hydroelectric power for the city

As with many other forms of infrastructure, Cape Town stands out amongst South Africa's metropolitan areas for having a far more developed, stable energy supply. The city is home to the country's only nuclear power station - Koeberg – as well as numerous other forms of power generating plants. A second nuclear station, situated in Duynefontein (slightly south-east of Koeberg) is planned. The new plant received Environmental Authorization in 2025, and awaits further statutory approvals by the national government.

Furthermore, Cape Town uses a system of pumped hydro electricity storage (at Steenbras) to supplement its own power generation and avoid up to 2 stages of load shedding (power outages), when the rest of the national grid goes down due to insufficient energy to meet demand. This results in not only residential homes having more sustained power feeds, but also allows commercial and industrial operations to continue when other major areas in the country are without power, boosting Cape Town's economic output.

==== Energy infrastructure developments ====
In January 2024, it was reported that the City of Cape Town intended to leave national energy operator Eskom behind, and become completely energy self-sustaining. Through adding 650MW of independent power to the city's grid, Cape Town aims to protect itself against the first 4 stages of Eskom load-shedding by 2026, with the goal of eventually becoming entirely self-sufficient, meeting its own electricity demand. The closing date for tender submissions for this project was 8 April 2024.

The City aims to procure power from existing generators, and will follow a two-pronged structure, allowing bidders to supplement dispatchable or reserve power with an optional self-dispatchable component – the latter being at a lower cost than the prevailing Eskom Megaflex Tariff.

Cape Town was able to go ahead with this plan after successful advocacy to the national government for the integration of independent power producers (IPPs) into the national grid. The City of Cape Town took the Department of Mineral Resources and Energy (DMRE) and the National Energy Regulator of South Africa (Nersa) to court, after Nersa said it could not allow for independent power production unless the Ministry made changes.

Cape Town's progress with a holistic energy plan, detached from Eskom, was achieved following the gazetting of amendments to the electricity regulations for new electricity generation capacity in 2020, by then-Mineral Resources and Energy Minister Gwede Mantashe.

The new regulations opened the way for municipalities in good financial standing to develop their own power generation projects. President Ramaphosa announced the changes in a speech to Parliament in the same year, which marked the first time municipalities were allowed to buy energy from sources other than state-owned Eskom's monopolistic system.

Recent and in-progress power diversification methods include:

- Private Small-Scale Embedded Generation (SSEG), providing up to 100 MW
- Embedded independent power producer renewable energy, providing up to 200MW
- A dispatchable IPP Program, providing up to 500MW
- Wheeling, providing up to 350MW
- City-owned SSEG, providing up to 20MW

The City of Cape Town announced a "Cash for Power" program in 2024, as part of its overall Energy Strategy. The program allows for Cape Town households to earn money for selling excess power they generate via solar panels back to the city's grid – a first for South Africa. The City opened applications for residential households to feed power into the grid by means of grid-tied solar photovoltaic (PV) systems and bi-directional meters.

During the announcement speech, Cape Town's Mayor also criticized the national government and Eskom for not fixing the load shedding problems in South Africa, and said that Cape Town would not wait for matters with the national grid to be fixed, with the City instead making its own power generation plans.

Cape Town has South Africa's most advanced plans to buy power on the open market. In February 2025, the city announced that its Cash for Power program had 1,842 active participants, and had paid out over R55 million to its residents and businesses as part of the program, via credits applied to their municipal energy bills. 1,090 small-scale generators (sellers) were residential customers, and 752 were commercial or industrial. The city also stated that it was on track to double the payouts in the program's second year of operation.

The City further stated that it had launched an online system for registering solar PV systems for the program, and announced unveiled a cheaper, bi-directional meter to feed power back into the grid. Customers can offset their electricity bills without registering for the Cash for Power program. However, registering allows them to go into a credit status, with the City paying them back for any excess power generation.

In 2025, the conclusion of a year-long electricity wheeling pilot project was announced. 562,800 kWh of renewable electricity was successfully wheeled during the pilot. Enpower Trading, Etana Energy, and Equites were the traders for the process. Cape Town Mayor Geordin Hill-Lewis announced that the city would enter the next phase of the project, whereby it would promote the scaling up of power trading across Cape Town's electricity grid, based on bilateral and multilateral trading agreements.

The Mayor described the milestone as an exciting leap forward, to diversify Cape Town's electricity supplier base beyond Eskom, and towards a future of decentralized electricity trading in South Africa.

In June 2025, the City of Cape Town's Atlantis solar PV plant had finished the installation of around 2,400 solar panels out of a planned 12,850 panels, as part of a R200 million renewable-energy project. City of Cape Town Energy MEC Xanthea Limberg stated that the Atlantis site would operate as a hybrid plant, alongside the city's first utility-scale battery storage operation, totaling 8 MW. There are plans for a 60 MW solar plant to be built at Paardevlei, which is expected to provide sufficient protection from one stage of Eskom load shedding.

Cape Town has a goal of net-zero carbon municipal buildings by 2030, as well as a goal for alternative energy to meet 35% of the city's total demand by 2030.

The city's changes to its power infrastructure represent major changes in South Africa's overall electricity network, including a shift towards green energy, the integration of wheeling processes, a move towards energy diversification as a reaction to rising Eskom tariffs, and shorter-term, flexible contracts in a merchant market providing businesses with easier methods to source stable power.

In February 2026, Cape Town Mayor Geordin Hill-Lewis announced that the City would that same month begin the process of engaging with a private electricity trading company to provide Cape Town with additional energy. The agreement would significantly shift how the city sources its power, breaking the monopoly long-held by national producer Eskom, and allowing Cape Town to appoint a trading company to purchase power from a range of private energy providers.

The City has already entered into numerous supply agreements with various companies that would, following the appointment of the trading company, build the required generation capacity. The Mayor said that using a trading platform alleviates the need to negotiate private power agreements contract by contract directly with providers, streamlining the energy sourcing process for the City.

Energy sourced via the new trading method and private providers is set to be cheaper than that sourced from Eskom, and will also mostly be derived from renewable sources, in keeping with Cape Town's overarching net-zero carbon emission goals.

In September 2026, Cape Town became the first city in South Africa to sign a power purchase agreement with an independent power producer (IPP), allowing the municipality to source energy outside of Eskom, and at competitive rates. This was possible due to the recent liberalization of South Africa's energy market, which was historically controlled exclusively by state-owned enterprise Eskom.

The City of Cape Town signed two solar energy purchasing agreements, worth a combined 70MW, and has plans to procure a further 130MW, for a total of 200MW under the current tendering process. The City said this would prevent unexpected price hikes to consumers, as the private energy increases would be linked to the Consumer Price Index (CPI) each year. The energy procured from the new IPPs came in at around 20% cheaper than Eskom purchasing rates.

=== Water supply ===
Cape Town's water is supplied via the Western Cape Water Supply System (WCWSS), a complex water supply system in the Western Cape province. The system comprises an interlinked network of six main dams, as well as pipelines, tunnels, distribution networks, and a number of minor dams - some owned and operated by the national Department of Water and Sanitation, and some by the City of Cape Town metro government.

Cape Town has extremely high-quality drinking water, ranking the best in South Africa as of February 2026, according to Stats SA.

==== Water crisis of 2017 to 2018 ====
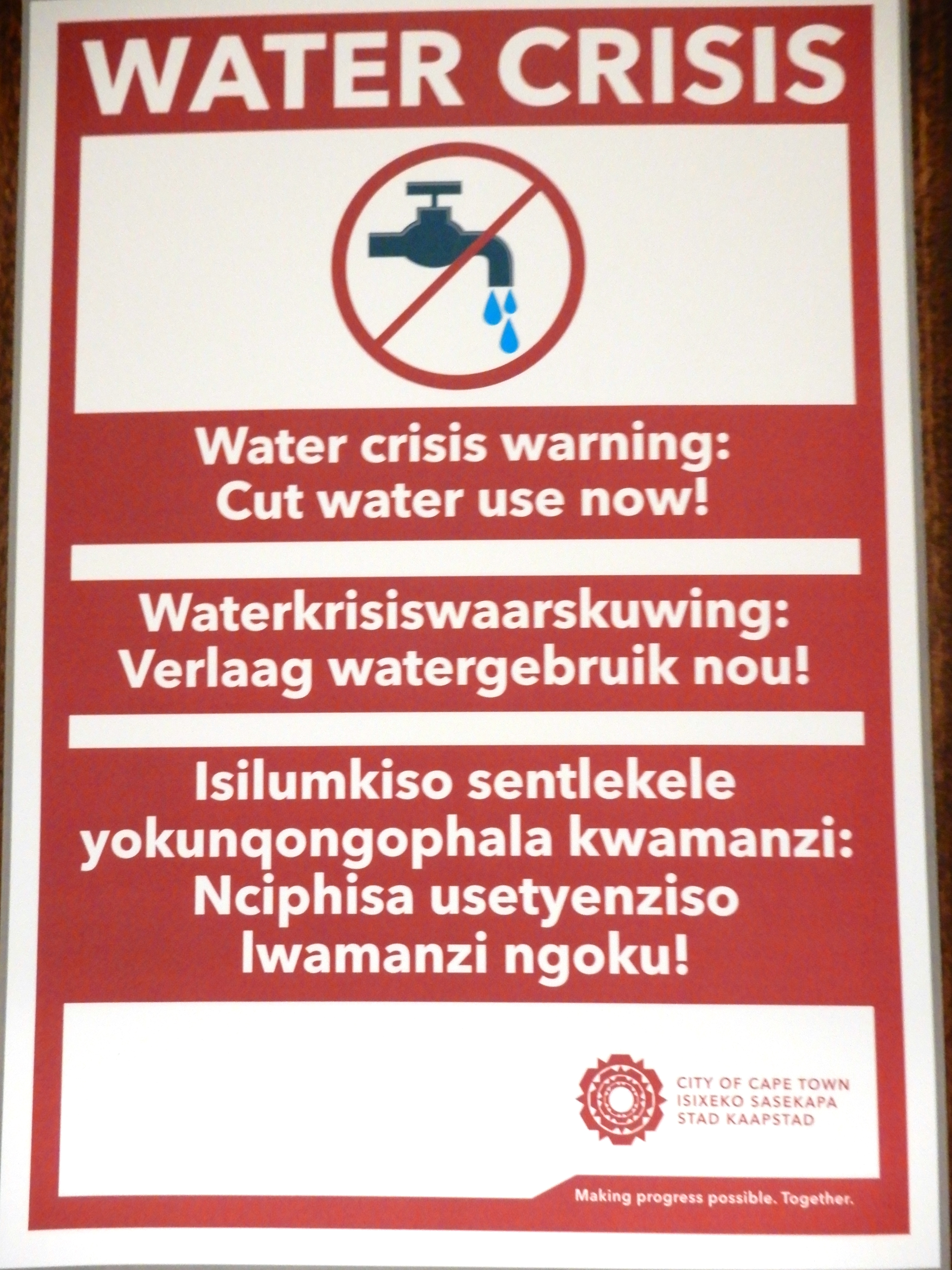
Water crisis warning in Cape Town in 2018

The Cape Town water crisis of 2017 to 2018 was a period of severe water shortage in the Western Cape region, most notably affecting the City of Cape Town. While dam water levels had been declining since 2015, the Cape Town water crisis peaked during mid-2017 to mid-2018 when water levels hovered between 15 and 30 percent of total dam capacity.

In late 2017, there were first mentions of plans for "Day Zero", a shorthand reference for the day when the water level of the major dams supplying the city could fall below 13.5 percent. "Day Zero" would mark the start of Level 7 water restrictions, when municipal water supplies would be largely switched off and it was envisioned that residents could have to queue for their daily ration of water. If this had occurred, it would have made the City of Cape Town the first major city in the world to run out of water.

The city of Cape Town implemented significant water restrictions in a bid to curb water usage, and succeeded in reducing its daily water usage by more than half to around 500 million litres (130,000,000 US gal) per day in March 2018. The fall in water usage led the city to postpone its estimate for "Day Zero", and strong rains starting in June 2018 led to dam levels recovering.

In September 2018, with dam levels close to 70 percent, the city began easing water restrictions, indicating that the worst of the water crisis was over. Good rains in 2020 effectively broke the drought and resulting water shortage when dam levels reached 95 percent. Concerns have been raised, however, that unsustainble demand and limited water supply could result in future drought events.

==== Water infrastructure developments ====
The City of Cape Town has mapped out a New Water Program, and Water Strategy, which plan to add 300 million litres of water per day to the city's supply, through measures including desalination, tapping into groundwater, and clearing invasive species.

In mid-2024, the Cape Town municipality stated that it was embarking on an infrastructure stability program, which involves refurbishing infrastructure and building new capacity, with funds for the program already having been added to the city's budget.

The City of Cape Town announced in 2024 that it planned to build a desalination plant, to further strengthen Cape Town's water supply. A feasibility study was planned to be completed in 2025. The facility is expected to produce between 50 million and 70 million litres of water a day, with a targeted starting date of 2030.

The plant will be located on undeveloped land, at the intersection of the R27 and N1, in the vicinity of the Port of Cape Town. The city is undertaking an environmental impact assessment process for the project.

City of Cape Town Water and Sanitation MMC Zahid Badroodien stated that the proposed Paarden Island desalination plant would feature a 22,000 square meter sea water, reverse-osmosis operation, for use by Cape Town households. The estimated capital cost of the plant was roughly R5 billion, excluding VAT, and will be funded through the city's water tariff.

=== Future infrastructure developments ===
As part of Cape Town's Vision 2050 project, the City aims to significantly upgrade its infrastructure. The 25-year project, unveiled by the City in mid-2025, was opened for public comment for a period of around 2 months. At the time, Cape Town's Mayor stated that the project's overarching goal was for Cape Town to remain a, "future-fit city of opportunities for all". 75% of the project's goals will directly benefit lower-income households.

Some of Vision 2050's aims include:

- Public transport accounting for 75% of all trips, with no resident spending more than 10% of their income on commuting.
- 35% of electricity obtained from alternative sources by 2030, supported by grid upgrades.
- 25% of water obtained from non-surface sources by 2040.
- 50,000 new housing opportunities created annually, through both land releases and private-sector partnerships.
- Taking over passenger rail from the national government, to revive it as the city's transport backbone.
- Expanding the city's policing powers to combat crime more effectively. This includes Smart Policing that is data and tech-driven.
- Diverting 70% of waste from landfills through methods including recycling and better waste management.
- Increased use of digital technology and artificial intelligence for better governance and improved communication with residents.
- Improved disaster risk capacity to deal with climate challenges.
- Biodiversity protections, and increasing annual tree planting rates to plant 100,000 trees by 2050. This is in line with the city's Urban Forest Policy.
- A 120% increase in the city's gross economic output by 2050.

== Transport ==
=== Air ===
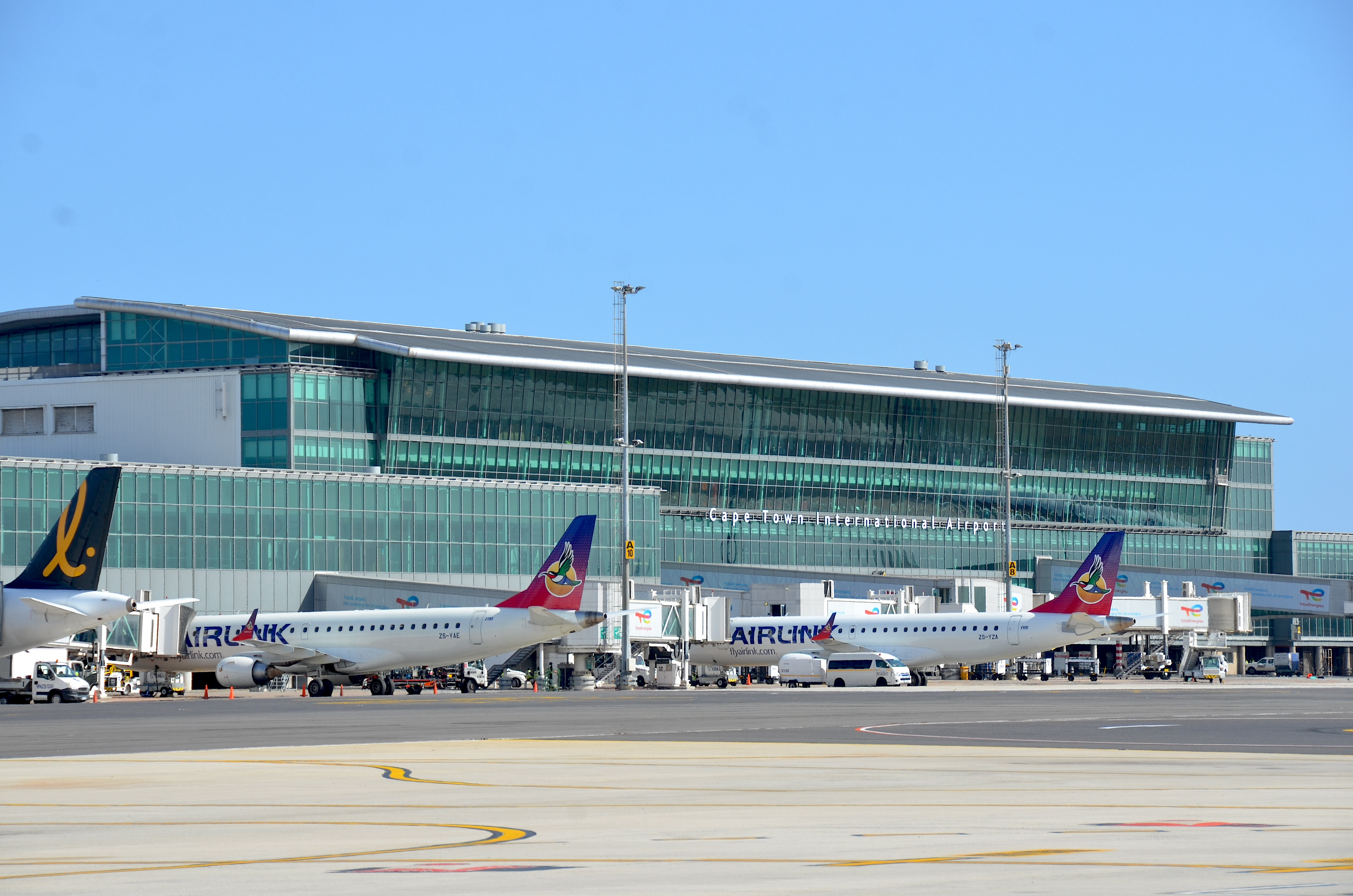
Cape Town International Airport's terminal building, with Airlink planes in front

Cape Town International Airport serves both domestic and international flights. It is the second-largest airport in South Africa and serves as a major gateway for travellers to the Cape region. Cape Town has regularly scheduled services to other parts of Southern Africa, East Africa, Mauritius, Middle East, Far East, Europe, Brazil and the United States as well as eleven domestic destinations.

As tourism numbers increased in the lead-up to the tournament of the 2010 FIFA World Cup, Cape Town International Airport opened a brand new central terminal building that was developed to handle an expected increase in air traffic.

Other renovations include several large new parking garages, a revamped domestic departure terminal, a new Bus Rapid Transit system station and a new double-decker road system. The airport's cargo facilities are also being expanded and several large empty plots are being developed into office space and hotels.

Cape Town is one of five internationally recognised Antarctic gateway cities with transportation connections. Since 2021, commercial flights have operated from Cape Town to Wolf's Fang Runway, Antarctica. The Cape Town International Airport was among the winners of the World Travel Awards for being Africa's leading airport. Cape Town International Airport is located 18 km from the Central Business District.

A second airport has been proposed to serve Cape Town. As of 2025, Cape Winelands Airport, currently a private airfield, is undergoing planning for redevelopment. It is situated near Durbanville, in Cape Town's Northern Suburbs. If approved and completed, it will become the city's first private airport, and aims to focus on domestic travel, increase Cape Town's global competitiveness as a travel destination, and serve as a backup aviation hub for Cape Town International.

CWA's redevelopment is financially backed by South Africa's largest real estate investment trust (REIT), Growthpoint Properties, and the chosen construction contractor is the country's largest of its kind, WBHO. The airport aims to be operational by early 2028, and accommodate over 5 million passengers annually by 2050.

=== Sea ===
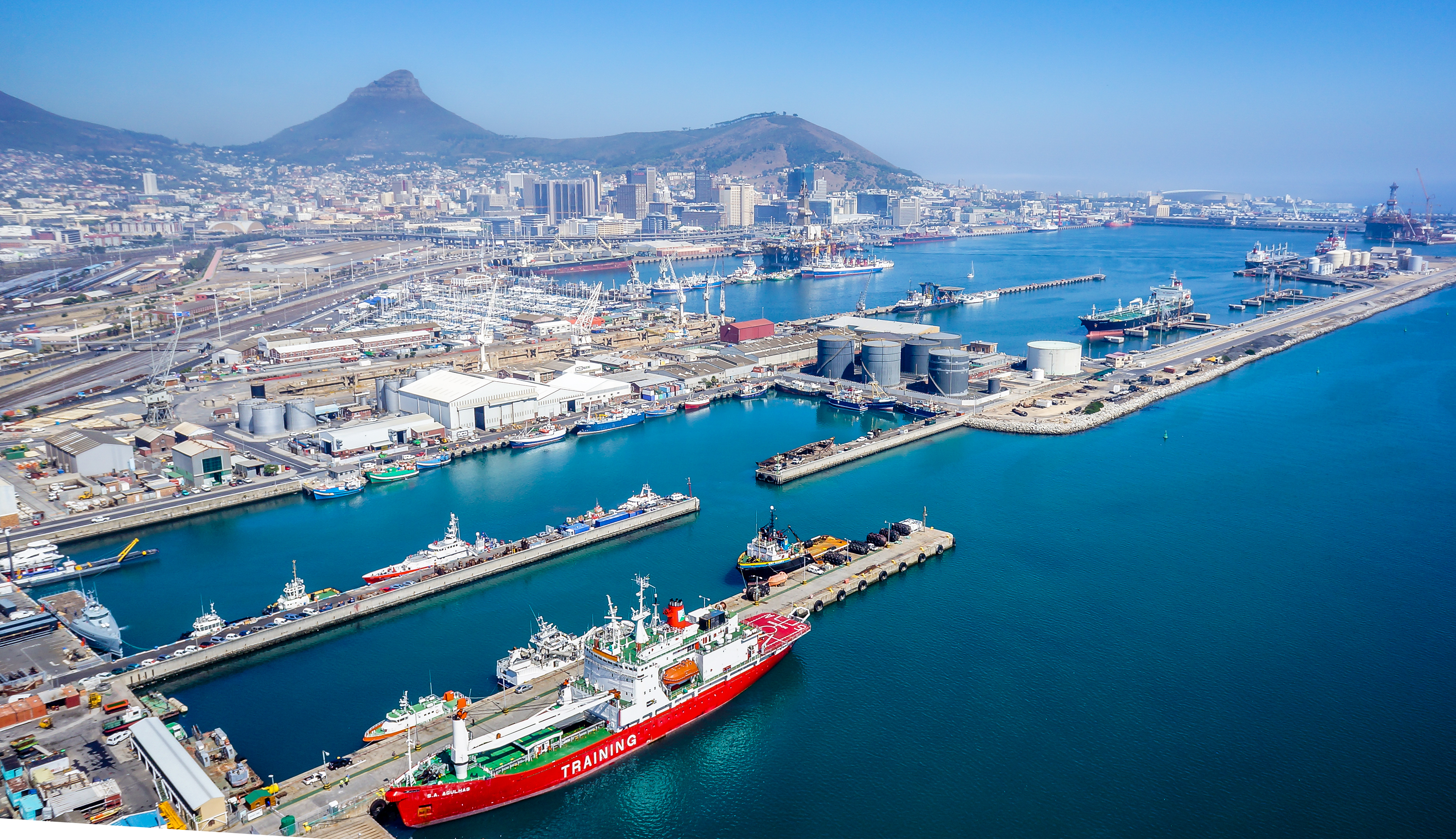
The Port of Cape Town is a major transport node in Africa. In addition to moving freight, it also hosts cruise ships, and serves as a major repair site for both ships and oil rigs

Cape Town has a long tradition as a port city, and its role as a re-provisioning stop at the midpoint of the Cape Route gained it the nicknames "Tavern of the Seas" and "Tavern of the Indian Ocean". The Port of Cape Town, the city's main port, is in Table Bay directly to the north of the CBD.

The port is a hub for ships in the southern Atlantic: it is located along one of the busiest shipping corridors in the world, and acts as a stopover point for goods en route to or from Latin America and Asia. It is also an entry point into the South African market. It is the second-busiest container port in South Africa after Durban. In 2004, it handled 3,161 ships and 9.2 million tonnes of cargo.

Simon's Town Harbour on the False Bay coast of the Cape Peninsula is the main operational base of the South African Navy.

Until the 1970s the city was served by the Union Castle Line with service to the United Kingdom and St Helena. The RMS St Helena provided passenger and cargo service between Cape Town and St Helena until the opening of St Helena Airport.

The cargo vessel M/V Helena, under AW Shipping Management, takes a limited number of passengers, between Cape Town and St Helena and Ascension Island on its voyages. Multiple vessels also take passengers to and from Tristan da Cunha, inaccessible by aircraft, to and from Cape Town. In addition, NSB Niederelbe Schiffahrtsgesellschaft takes passengers on its cargo service to the Canary Islands and Hamburg, Germany.

=== Rail ===
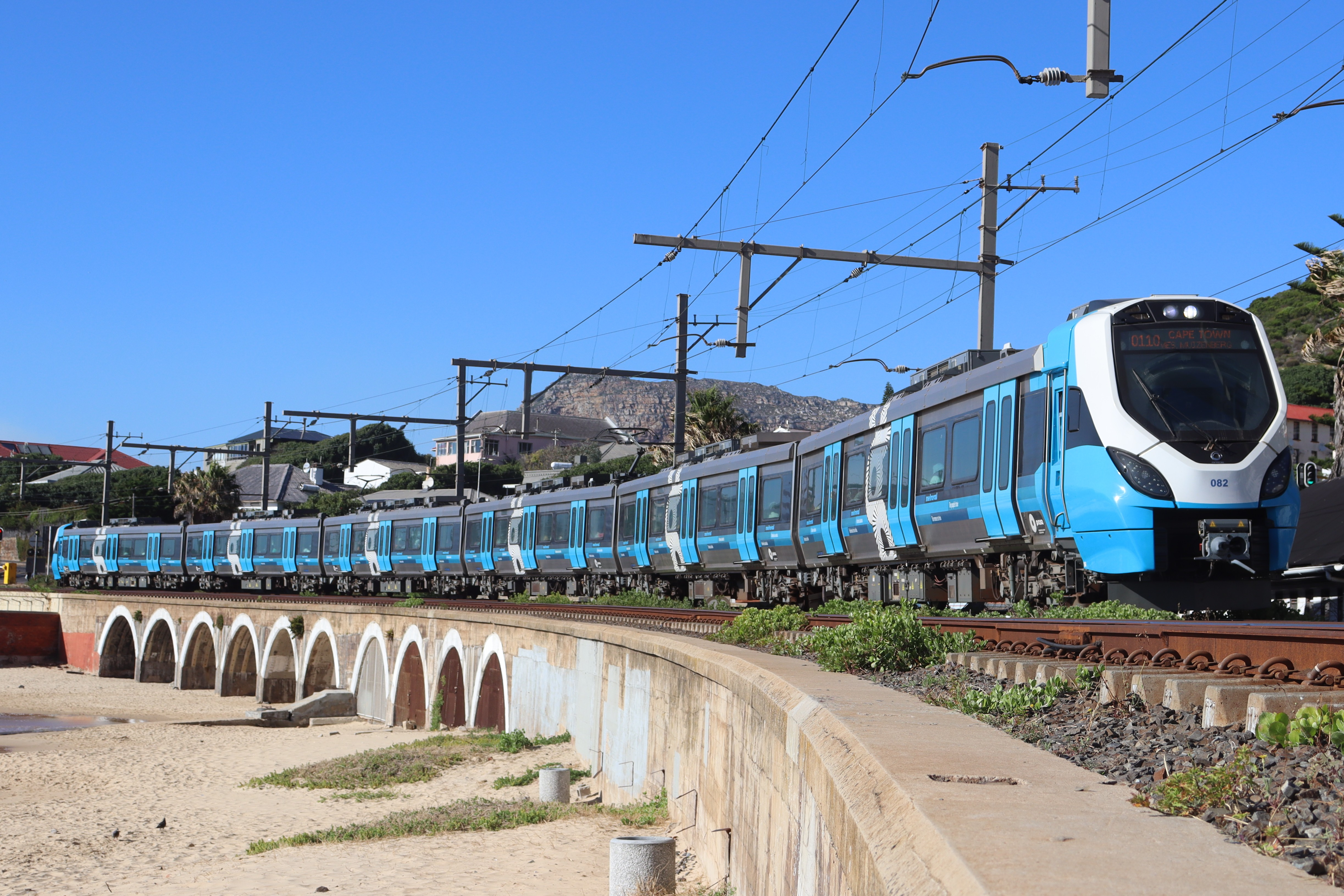
Metrorail train near Kalk Bay station

The Shosholoza Meyl is the passenger rail operations of the Passenger Rail Agency of South Africa and operates one long-distance passenger rail service from Cape Town as of 2024: a weekly service to and from Johannesburg via Kimberley. These trains terminate at Cape Town railway station and make a stop at Bellville. Cape Town is the terminus for two luxury tourist train routes as of 2024 operated by the Ceres Rail Company, traveling from the Waterfront to Simon's Town and Grabouw respectively.

Metrorail operates a commuter rail service in Cape Town and the surrounding area. The Metrorail network consists of 96 stations throughout the suburbs and outskirts of Cape Town.

=== Road ===
Cape Town is the origin of three national routes ("N" routes), namely the N1, N2, and N7.

The N1 begins at the foreshore area near the Cape Town city centre and runs east-north-east as a freeway through the towns of Goodwood, Parow, Bellville, Brackenfell and Kraaifontein before continuing towards Paarl. It connects Cape Town to major cities further inland, namely Bloemfontein, Johannesburg, and Pretoria. An older at-grade road, the R101, runs parallel to the N1 from Bellville to Worcester.

The N2 begins at the foreshore area near the Cape Town city centre and runs east-south-east through Mowbray, Khayelitsha, Macassar and Somerset West before leaving the municipality as the Sir Lowry's Pass, connecting with coastal cities to the east, including Mossel Bay, George, Port Elizabeth, East London and Durban. An older at-grade road, the R102, runs parallel to the N1 initially, before veering south-east at Bellville, to join the N2 at Somerset West via the towns of Kuilsrivier and Eersterivier.

The N7 originates from the N1 at Wingfield Interchange near Acacia Park and Edgemead. It heads northwards, initially as a highway, but becomes an at-grade road from the intersection with the M12 onwards. It follows the Atlantic coast northwards towards Malmesbury, Clanwilliam, Vredendal, Springbok and the border with Namibia.

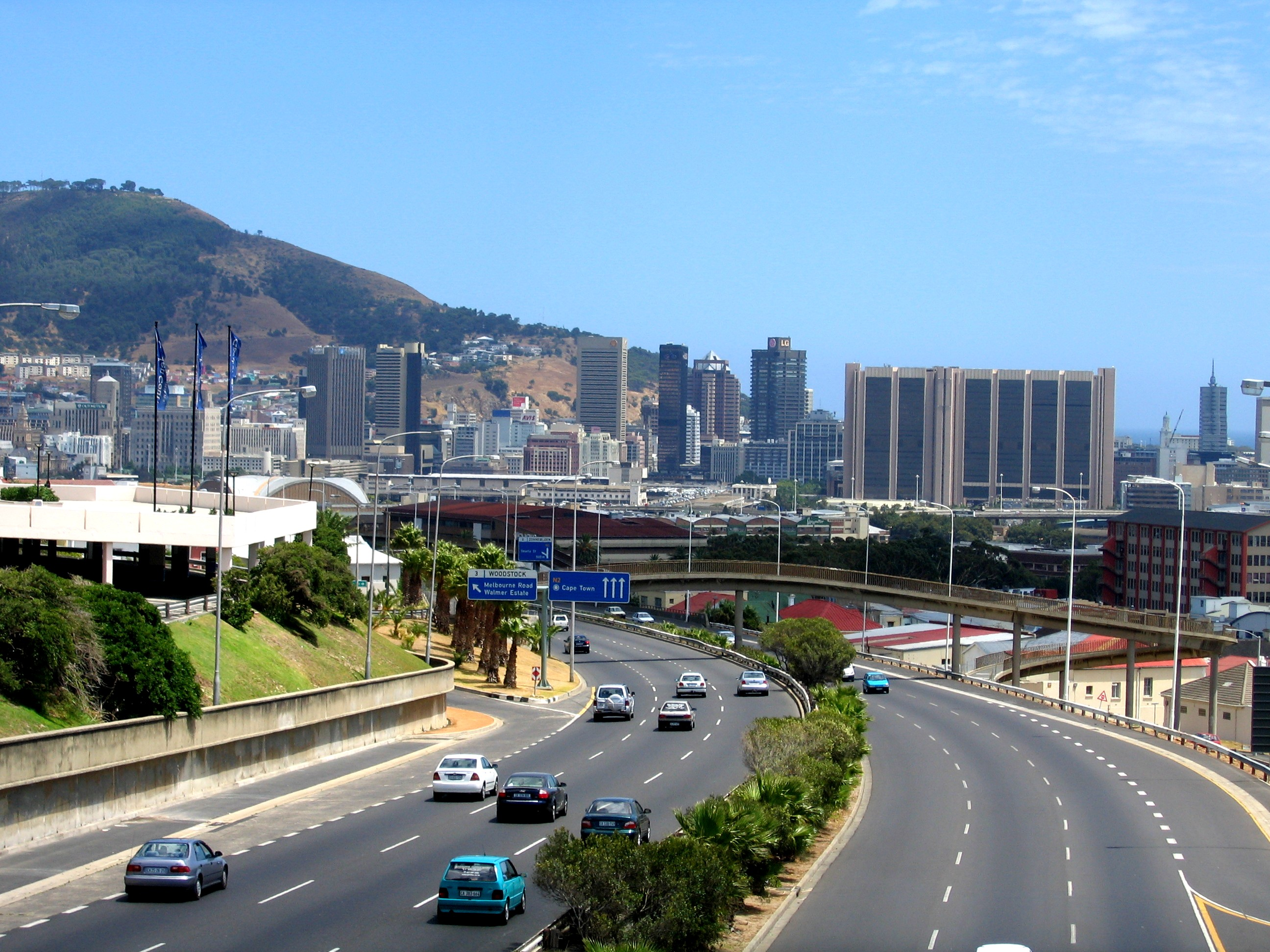
The N2 as it enters Cape Town CBD

There are also a number of provincial routes linking Cape Town with surrounding areas. The R27 originates from the N1 near the Foreshore and runs north parallel to the N7, but nearer to the coast. It passes through the suburbs of Milnerton, Table View and Bloubergstrand and links the city to the West Coast, ending at the town of Velddrif.

The R44 enters the east of the metro from the north, from Stellenbosch. It connects Stellenbosch to Somerset West, then crosses the N2 to Strand and Gordon's Bay. It exits the metro heading south hugging the coast, leading to the towns of Betty's Bay and Kleinmond.

There are also a number of regional routes ("R" routes) in the area. The R300 is an expressway linking the N1 at Brackenfell to the N2 near Mitchells Plain and the Cape Town International Airport. The R302 runs from the R102 in Bellville, heading north across the N1 through Durbanville before leaving the metro to reach Malmesbury.

The R304 enters the northern limits of the metro from Stellenbosch, running north-north-west before veering west to cross the N7 at Philadelphia to end at Atlantis at a junction with the R307. This R307 starts north of Koeberg from the R27 and, after meeting the R304, continues north to Darling. The R310 originates from Muizenberg and runs along the coast, to the south of Mitchell's Plain and Khayelitsha, before veering north-east, crossing the N2 west of Macassar, and exiting the metro heading to Stellenbosch.

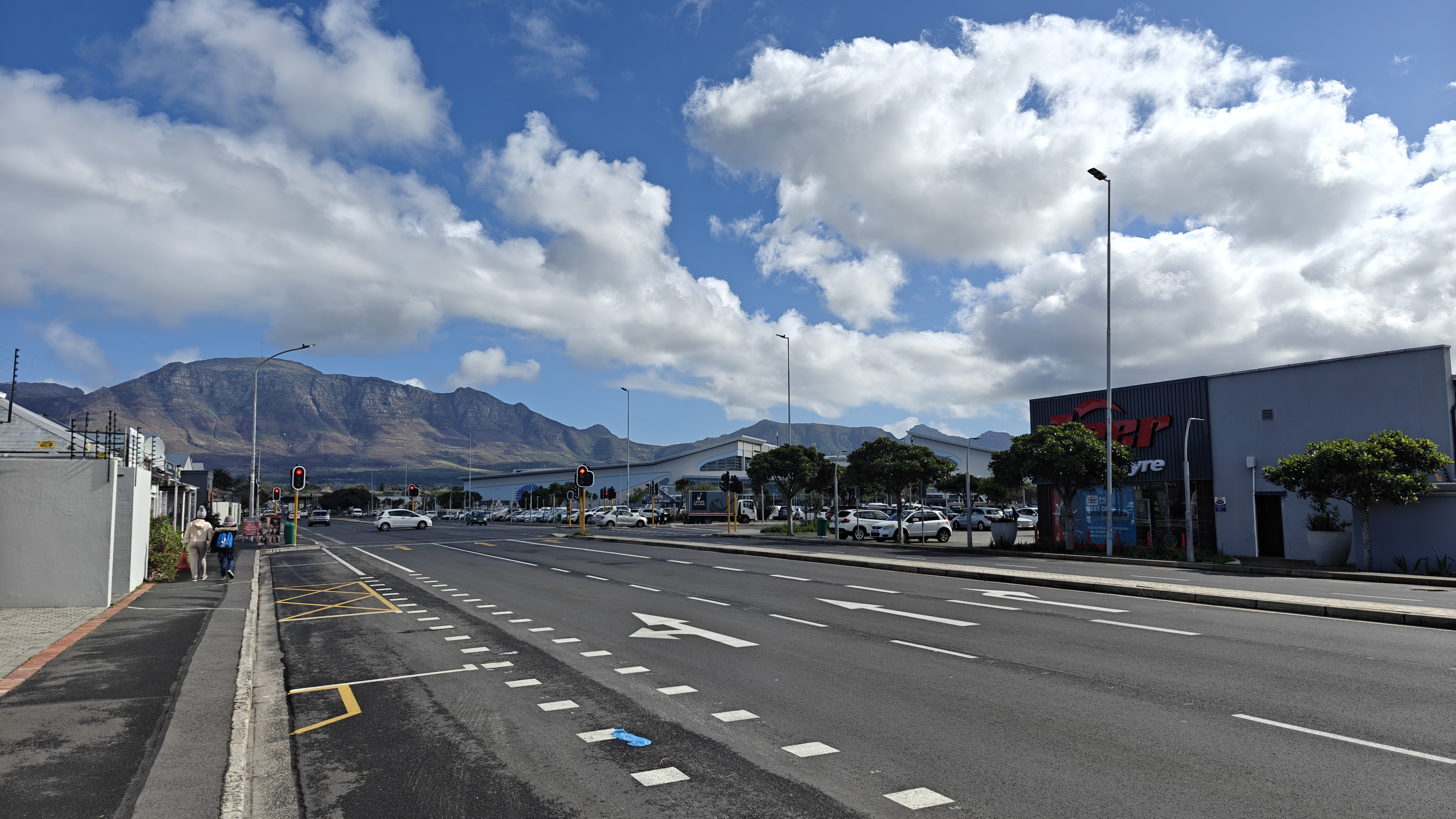
Road infrastructure in the suburb of Dreyersdal

Cape Town, like most South African cities, uses Metropolitan or "M" routes for important intra-city routes, a layer below National (N) roads and Regional (R) routes. Each city's M roads are independently numbered. Most are at-grade roads. The M3 splits from the N2 and runs to the south along the eastern slopes of Table Mountain, connecting the CBD with Muizenberg. Except for a section between Rondebosch and Newlands that has at-grade intersections, this route is a highway. The M5 splits from the N1 further east than the M3, and links the Cape Flats to the CBD. It is a highway as far as the interchange with the M68 at Ottery, before continuing as an at-grade road. Cape Town has the worst traffic congestion in South Africa as of 2015.

==== Licensing ====
Vehicles registered in the City of Cape Town metro use license plates denoting the subdivision of registration, from a group allocated by the provincial government. Due to population spread, most plates use "CA", while newer vehicles in Cape Town use "CAA", which was introduced in April 2019. Other regions include "CY" for Durbanville and surrounds, "CF" for Kuils River and surrounds, and "CFM" for Somerset West and surrounds. As with the rest of the Western Cape province, and as opposed to the original letter-number plate format, the most recent license plates issued in Cape Town use the format of two letters, two figures, and two letters (in any sequence), followed by "WC" (for Western Cape).

In terms of driver's licensing, Cape Town, and the Western Cape province, are significantly more advanced than the rest of South Africa. In May 2025, the Western Cape launched a digital learner's license testing system, the goal of which was to replace the traditional pen and paper test, reduce corruption, and deliver faster and more accurate results.

In September 2025, Cape Town launched its drive through driver's license renewal system, with a facility in Brackenfell. The system allows for rapid renewal (in under 5 minutes), without driver's leaving their cars. Renewals can be sped up further if driver's have received an SMS renewal confirmation, and show it at the drive through. The first facility is cashless, and operates Monday through Saturday.

=== Buses ===
City-owned MyCiTi and privately owned Golden Arrow both operate scheduled, metro-wide bus services. Several other companies run long-distance bus services between Cape Town and other South African cities.

==== Golden Arrow ====
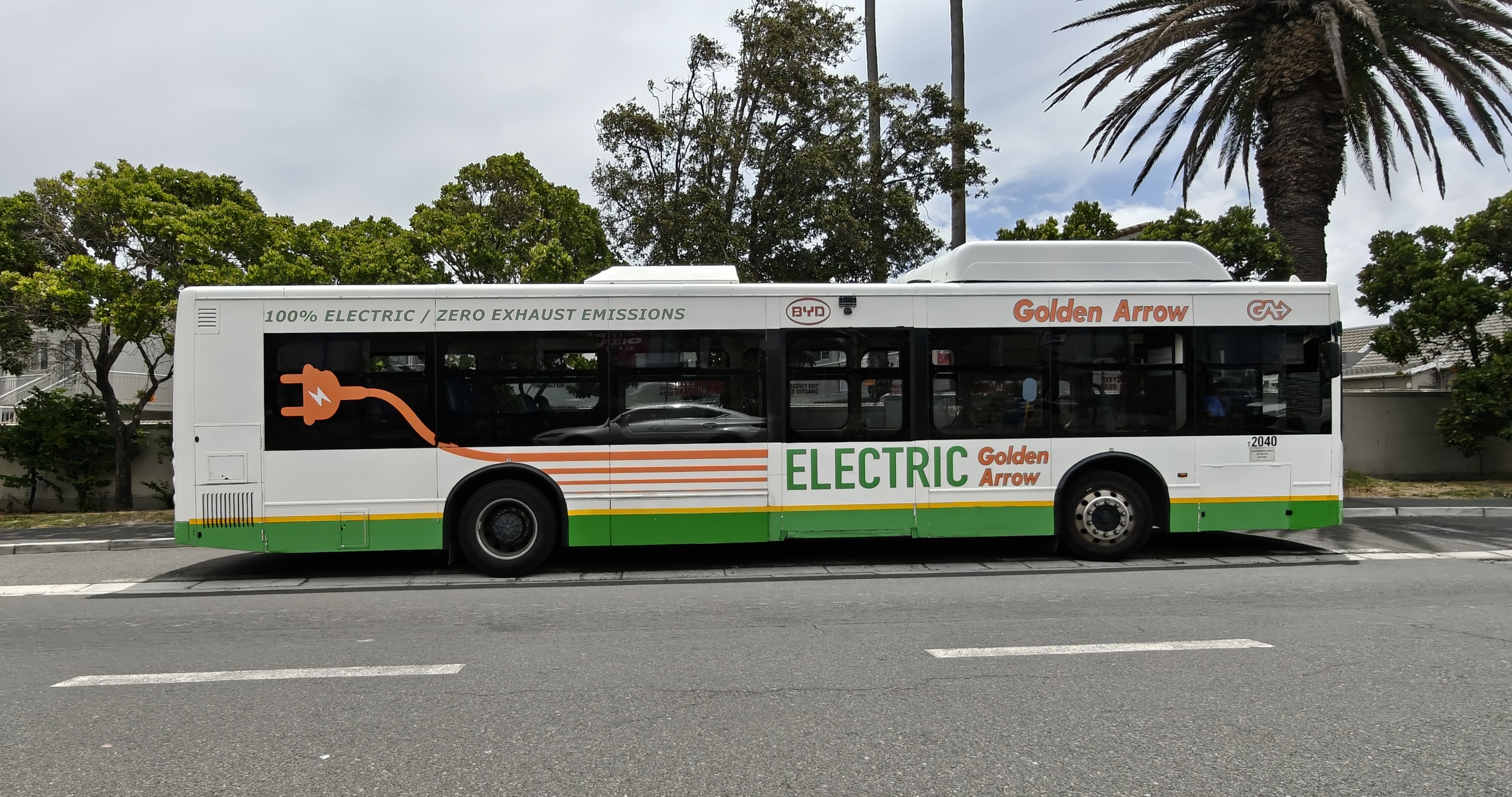
Golden Arrow electric bus, by BYD, in Kirstenhof, Cape Town

Golden Arrow Bus Services (GABS) provides commuter bus services throughout a large portion of Cape Town, and operates a fleet of around 1,200 electric and diesel buses on 1,300 routes, with a daily ridership of around 220,000 people.

The network uses an NFC Gold Card for cashless payments, and offers discounted fares for weekly and monthly passes, as well as for students and pensioners.

GABS operates 7 hubs, situated across the City of Cape Town.

Golden Arrow was the first bus operator in South Africa to roll out electric buses, via a partnership with BYD. The first fleet members entered operation in 2024, with more launched in 2025, alongside an expanded charging network.

==== MyCiTi ====
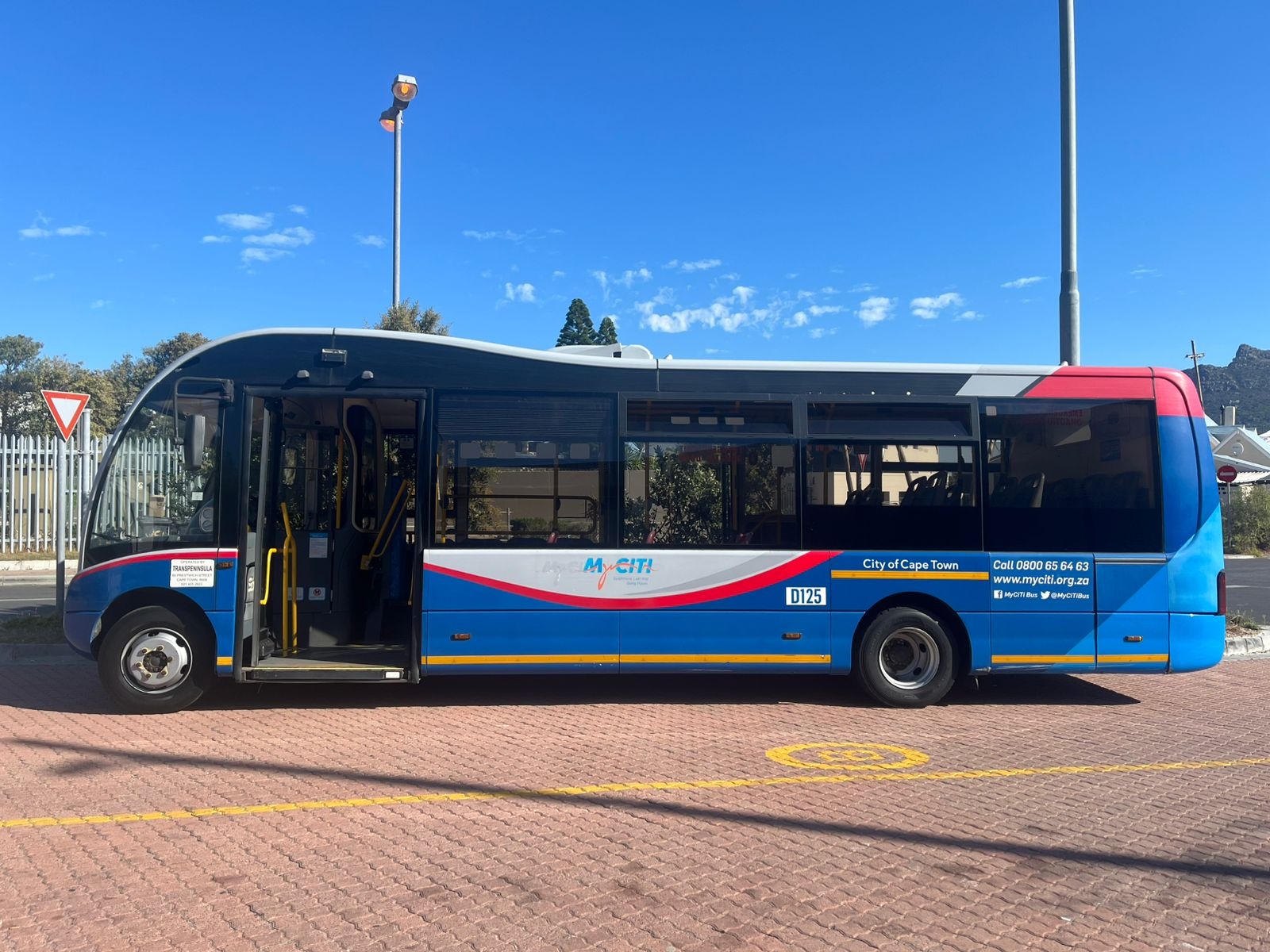
A MyCiTi Optare Solo bus

The MyCiTi bus rapid transit (BRT) system is extensive, and operated directly by the City of Cape Town. It forms a major part of the city's overall public transit system.

The system has a fleet of 223 electric and diesel buses, of various sizes. They operate between 42 stations, and around 1,000 stops throughout Cape Town.

The service operates on a combination of dedicated bus lanes (painted red and featuring dedicated bus traffic signals), and traditional, mixed-use roadways.

Stations feature free Wi-Fi, enclosed waiting areas, and off-grid power. MyCiTi requires cashless fare payment using mobile tap-to-pay, or the company's EMV-compliant card, called myconnect.

The MyCiTi BRT system is being rolled out across four phases. As of 2026, Phase 1A, 1B, and the N2 Corridor have been completed, and Phase 2A is underway. Phase 2A is the largest investment in public transit by any metro in South Africa in history, and features the construction of an electric bus charging depot, as well as South Africa's first elevated traffic circle.

A procurement agreement has been signed with Volvo Bus Southern Africa for electric buses, with initial deliveries scheduled for 2027.

=== Taxis ===
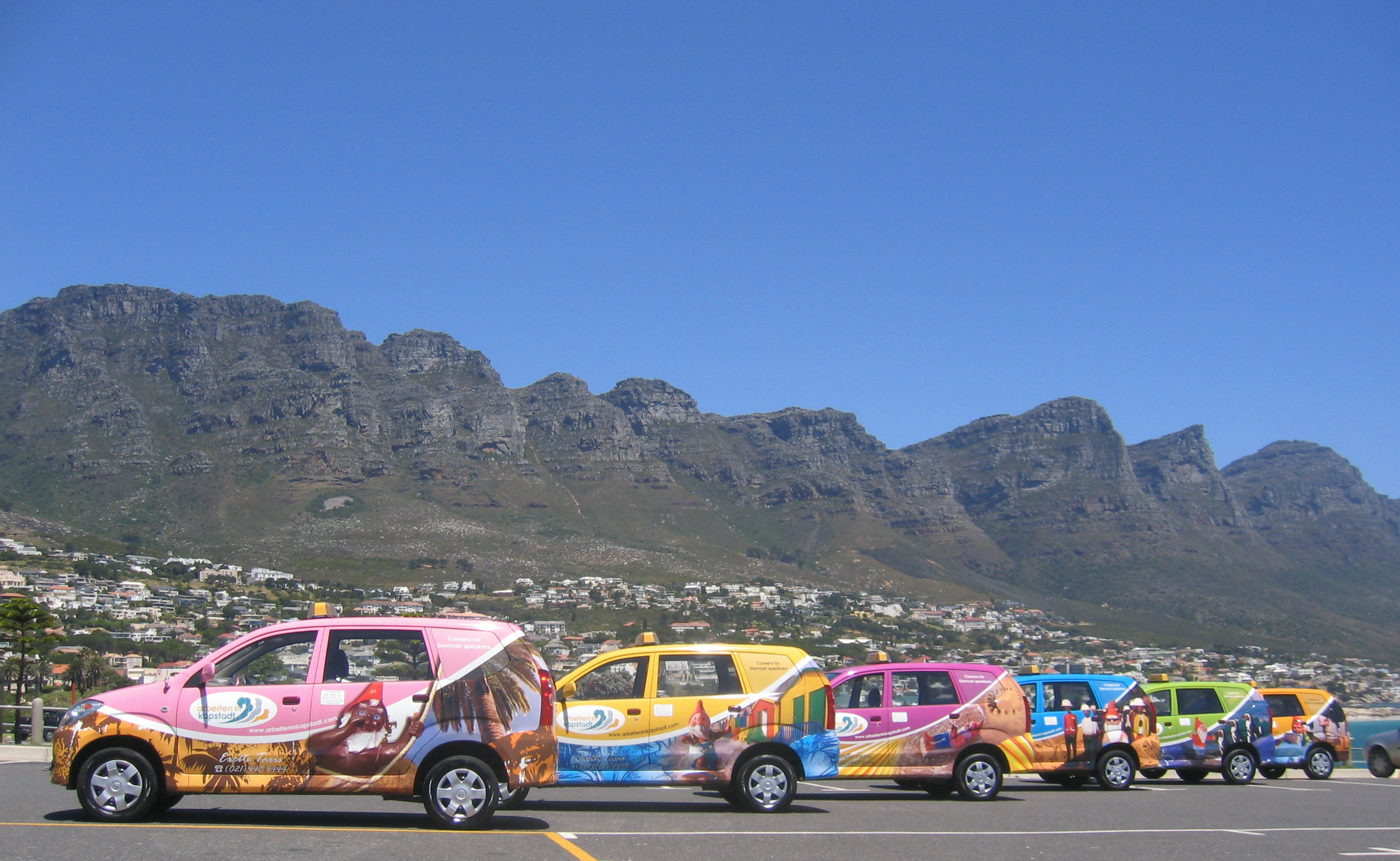
A fleet of privately owned taxis in Camps Bay

Cape Town has various kinds of taxis available, including those obtained through ride-hailing (app-based) services such as Bolt and Uber, as well as traditional metered taxies.

The Western Cape Provincial Regulatory Entity (PRE) issues ride-hailing licenses for Cape Town, which have expiry dates and need to be renewed. They are processed in the order they are received, and the PRE ensures drivers are operating legally. As of mid-2025, the city has 5,494 registered ride-hailing licenses.

Traditional taxis are either metered taxis or minibus taxis. Metered taxis can be found at transport hubs as well as other tourist establishments, while minibus taxis can be found at taxi ranks, and, commonly, travelling along main streets. Minibus taxis can be hailed from the road.

Cape Town metered taxi cabs mostly operate in CBD and Cape Town International Airport areas. Large companies that operate fleets of cabs can be reached by phone and are cheaper than the single operators that apply for hire from taxi ranks and Victoria and Alfred Waterfront.

There are about 1,000 meter taxis in Cape Town. Their rates vary from R8 per kilometre to about R15 per kilometre. The larger taxi companies in Cape Town are Excite Taxis, Cabnet and Intercab and single operators are reachable by cellular phone. The seven seated Toyota Avanza are the most popular with larger Taxi companies. Meter cabs are mostly used by tourists and are safer to use than minibus taxis.

Minibus taxis are the standard form of transport for the majority of the population who cannot afford private vehicles. Although essential, these taxis are often poorly maintained and are frequently not road-worthy. These taxis make frequent unscheduled stops to pick up passengers, which can cause accidents. With the high demand for transport by the working class of South Africa, minibus taxis are often filled over their legal passenger allowance. Minibuses are generally owned and operated in fleets.

== Culture ==
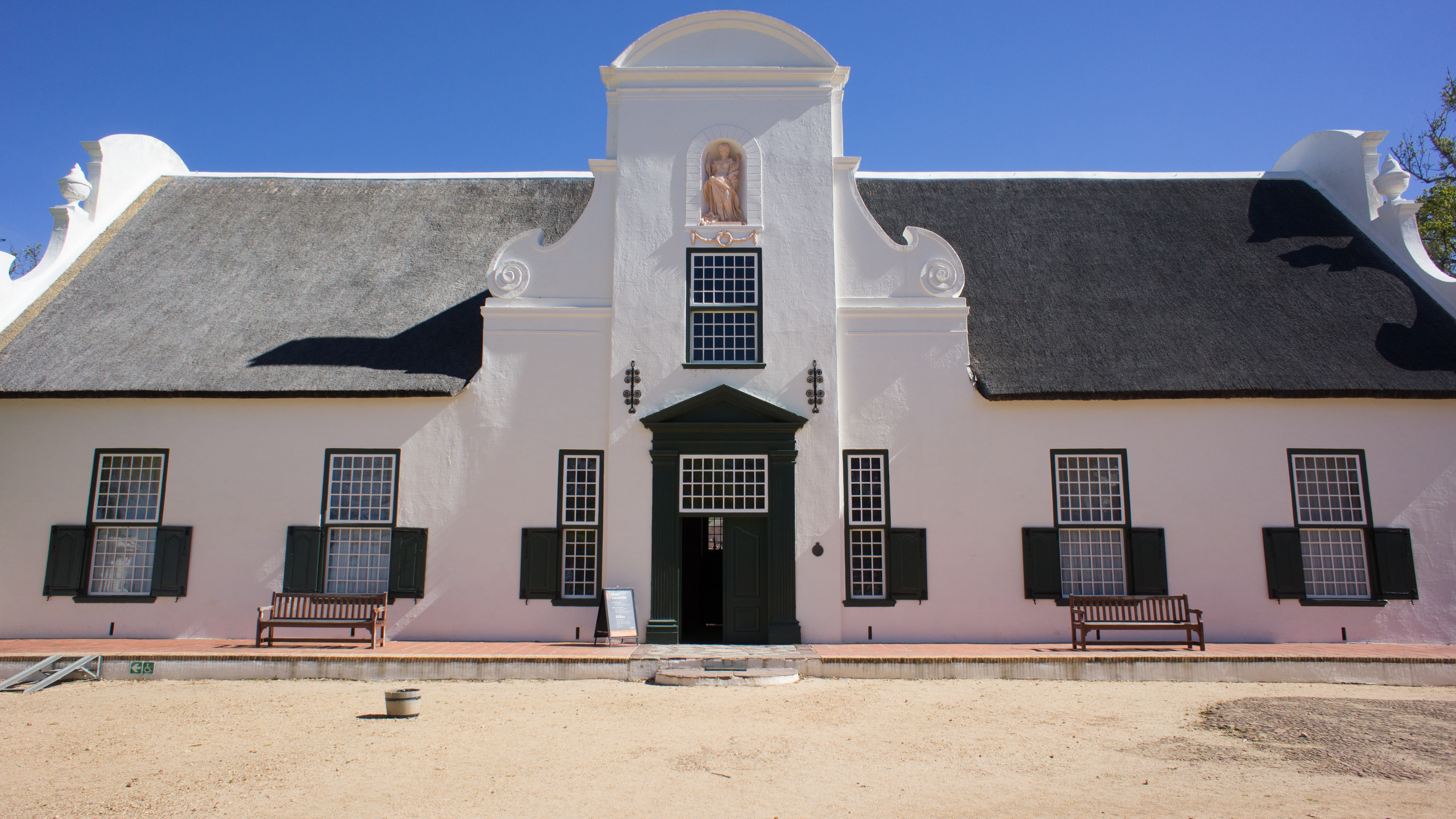
Groot Constantia, an example of Cape Dutch architecture.

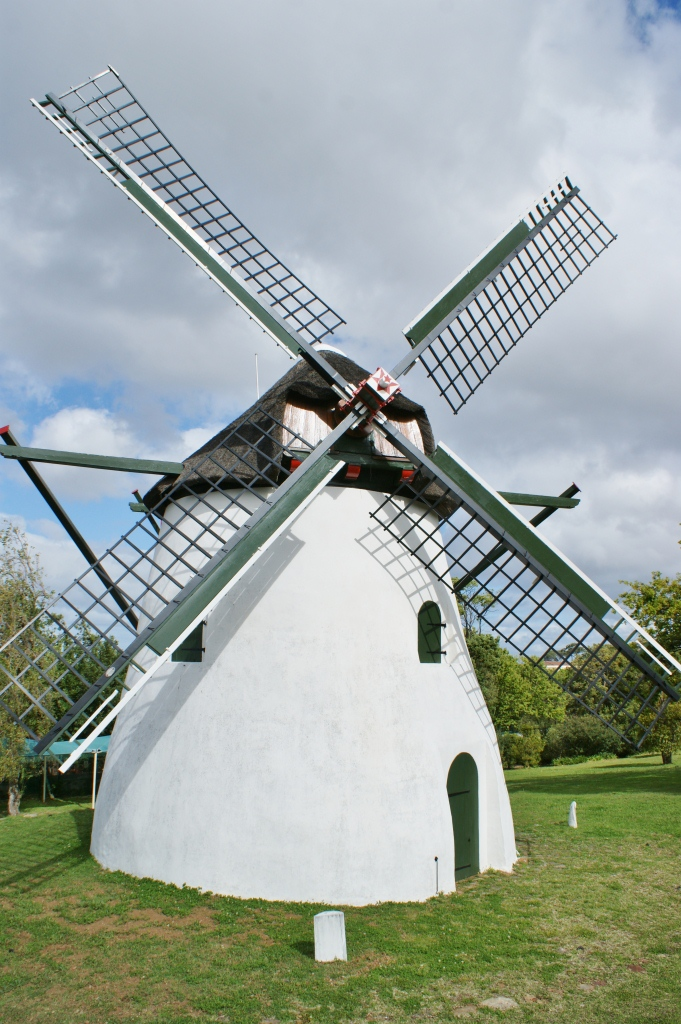
Mostert's Mill in Cape Town.

Cape Town is noted for its architectural heritage, with the highest density of Cape Dutch style buildings in the world. Cape Dutch style, which combines the architectural traditions of the Netherlands, Germany, France and Indonesia, is most visible in Constantia, the old government buildings in the Central Business District, and along Long Street. The only complete windmill in South Africa is Mostert's Mill, Mowbray. It was built in 1796 and restored in 1935 and again in 1995.

Cape Town was named the World Design Capital for 2014 by the International Council of Societies of Industrial Design. Cape Town is also recognized as a "Design City" by UNESCO's Creative Cities Network. The Artscape Theatre Centre is the largest performing arts venue in Cape Town.

In 2026, Cape Town was named the 5th-best city in the world for arts and culture, by UK's Time Out magazine.

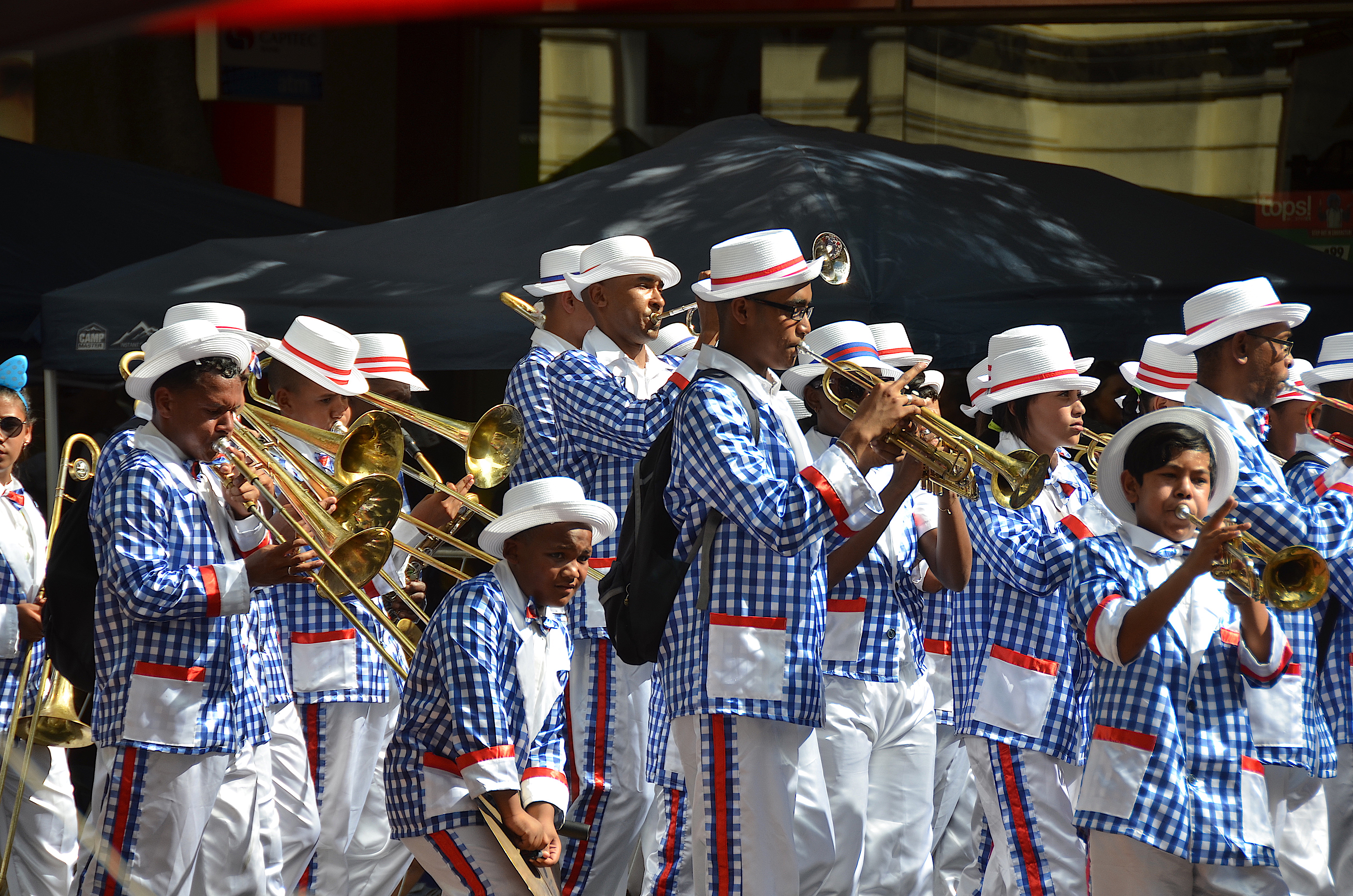
Cape Town Minstrel Carnival (2017).

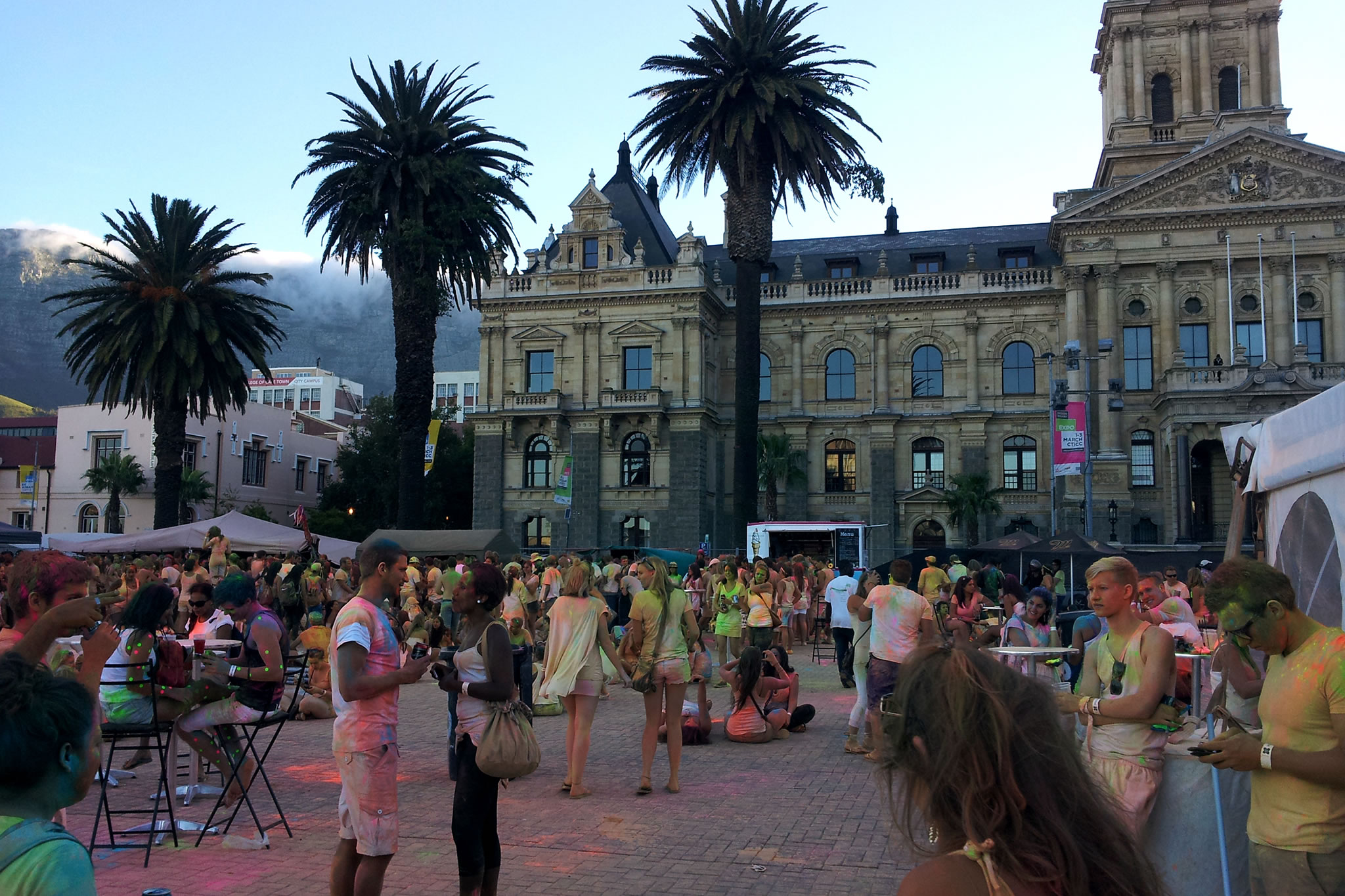
Holi festival at the Grand Parade.

The annual Cape Town Minstrel Carnival, also known by its Afrikaans name of Kaapse Klopse, is a large minstrel festival held annually on 2 January or "Tweede Nuwe Jaar" (Second New Year). Competing teams of minstrels parade in brightly coloured costumes, performing Cape Jazz, either carrying colourful umbrellas or playing an array of musical instruments.

The city also encloses the 36 hectare Kirstenbosch National Botanical Garden that contains protected natural forest and fynbos along with a variety of animals and birds. There are over 7,000 species in cultivation at Kirstenbosch, including many rare and threatened species of the Cape Floristic Region. In 2004 this Region, including Kirstenbosch, was declared a UNESCO World Heritage Site.

Whale watching is popular amongst tourists: southern right whales and humpback whales are seen off the coast during the breeding season (August to November) and Bryde's whales and orca can be seen any time of the year. The nearby town of Hermanus is known for its Whale Festival, but whales can also be seen in False Bay. Heaviside's dolphins are endemic to the area and can be seen from the coast north of Cape Town; dusky dolphins live along the same coast and can occasionally be seen from the ferry to Robben Island.

=== Cuisine ===
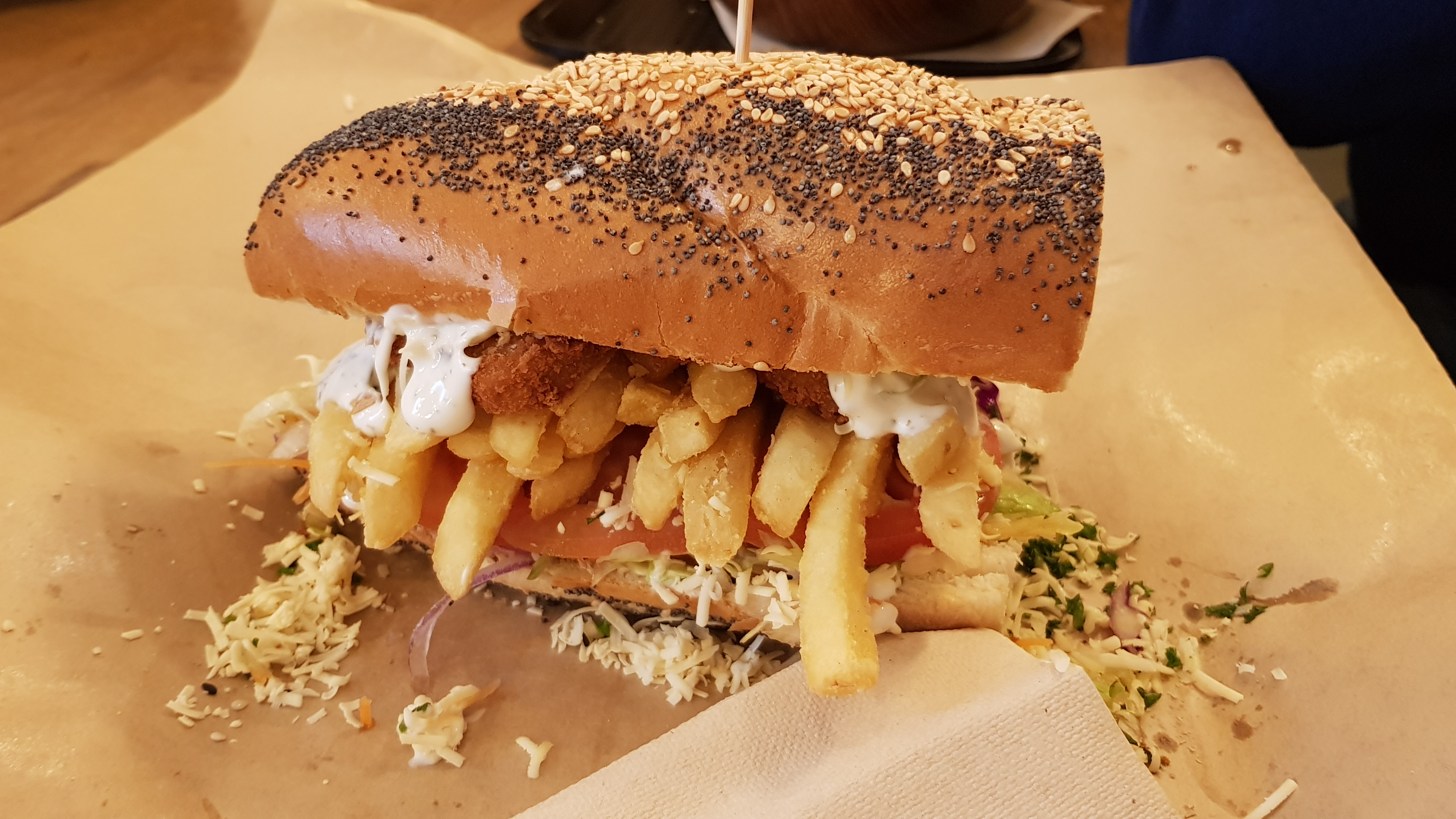
A gatsby sandwich, freshly prepared

Food originating from or synonymous with Cape Town includes the savoury sweet spiced meat dish Bobotie that dates from the 17th century. The Gatsby, a sandwich filled with slap chips and other toppings, was first served in 1976 in the suburb of Athlone and is also synonymous with the city. The koe'sister is a traditional Cape Malay pastry described as a cinnamon infused dumpling with a cake-like texture, finished off with a sprinkling of desiccated coconut.

Malva pudding (sometimes known as Cape Malva pudding) is a sticky sweet dessert often served with hot custard is also associated with the city and dates back to the 17th century. A related dessert dish, Cape Brandy Pudding, is also associated with the city and surrounding region. Cape Town is also the home of the South African wine industry with the first wine produced in the country being bottled in the city; a number of notable wineries still exist in the city including Groot Constantia and Klein Constantia.

The city has gained international recognition for its pizza scene. In 2025, then-new, family-owned restaurant NOVO, based in Mowbray, ranked in publication Time Out's Top 20 Pizzas globally. It did so for its "The Fellini" creation. In the 2026 ranking from the same publication, Woodstock-based establishment Pizza Connection ranked 11th on the list, for its "The Capetonian" pizza.

Coffee culture in Cape Town is thriving, with many independent coffeehouses and cafe chains with locations across the city. All four of South Africa's largest cafe chains, Vida e Caffè, Seattle Coffee Company, WCafe, and Bootlegger Coffee Company, are headquartered in Cape Town. Furthermore, the city is home to 10 roasteries.

Cape Town is considered one of the best cities in the world for coffee, and is known as an international coffee capital. In 2024, Cape Town was ranked as the world's 9th best city for coffee by US Food & Wine Magazine. Truth Coffee, situated in Cape Town CBD, was voted Best Coffee Shop in the World in 2015 and 2016 by the UK's Daily Telegraph and Espresso Lab in Woodstock was voted the 11th best coffee shop in the world, and the best in Africa, in 2025.

=== Media ===
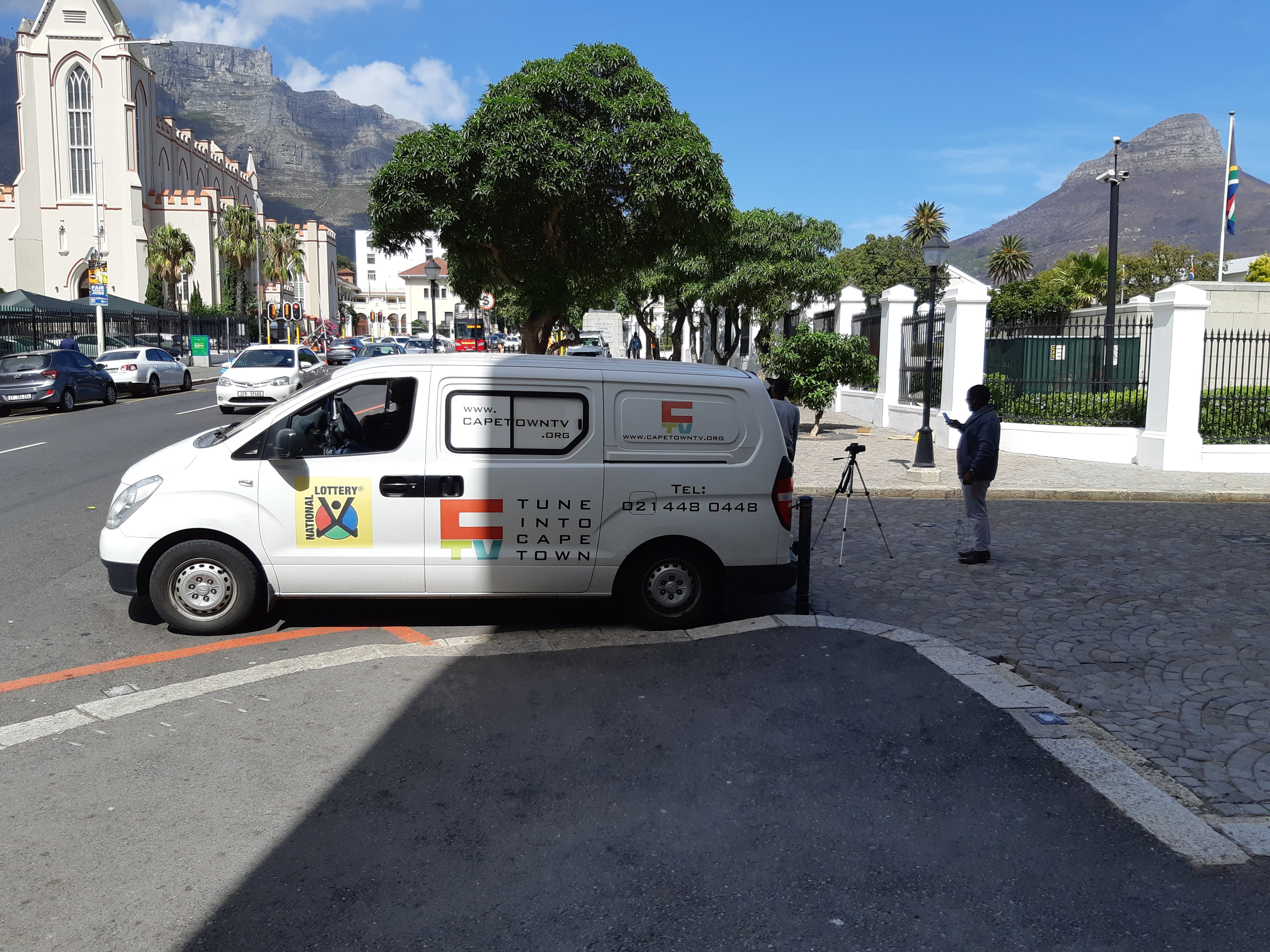
A news van owned by Cape Town TV outside the Houses of Parliament

Several newspapers, magazines and printing facilities have their offices in the city. Independent News and Media publishes the major English language papers in the city, the Cape Argus and the Cape Times. Naspers, the largest media conglomerate in South Africa, publishes Die Burger, the major Afrikaans language paper.

Cape Town has many local community newspapers. Some of the largest community newspapers in English are the Athlone News from Athlone, the Atlantic Sun, the Constantiaberg Bulletin from Constantiaberg, the City Vision from Bellville, the False Bay Echo from False Bay, Bolander (formerly known as the Helderberg Sun) from Helderberg, the Plainsman from Michell's Plain, the Sentinel News from Hout Bay, the Southern Mail from the Southern Peninsula, the Southern Suburbs Tatler from the Southern Suburbs, Table Talk from Table View and Tygertalk from Tygervalley/Durbanville. Afrikaans language community newspapers include the Landbou-Burger and the Tygerburger. Vukani, based in the Cape Flats, is published in Xhosa.

Cape Town is a centre for major broadcast media with several radio stations that only broadcast within the city. 94.5 Kfm (94.5 MHz FM) and Good Hope FM (94–97 MHz FM) mostly play pop music. Heart FM (104.9 MHz FM), the former P4 Radio, plays jazz and R&B, while Fine Music Radio (101.3 FM) plays classical music and jazz, and Magic Music Radio (828 kHz MW) plays adult contemporary and classic rock from the '80s, '90s and '00s.

Bush Radio is a community radio station (89.5 MHz FM). The Voice of the Cape (95.8 MHz FM) and Cape Talk (567 kHz MW) are the major talk radio stations in the city. Bokradio (98.9 MHz FM) is an Afrikaans music station. The University of Cape Town also runs its own radio station, UCT Radio (104.5 MHz FM).

The SABC has a small presence in the city, with satellite studios located at Sea Point. e.tv has a greater presence, with a large complex located at Longkloof Studios in Gardens. M-Net is not well represented with infrastructure within the city. Cape Town TV is a local TV station, supported by numerous organisation and focusing mostly on documentaries.

Numerous productions companies and their support industries are located in the city, mostly supporting the production of overseas commercials, model shoots, TV-series and movies. The local media infrastructure remains primarily in Johannesburg.

=== Hiking and trails ===
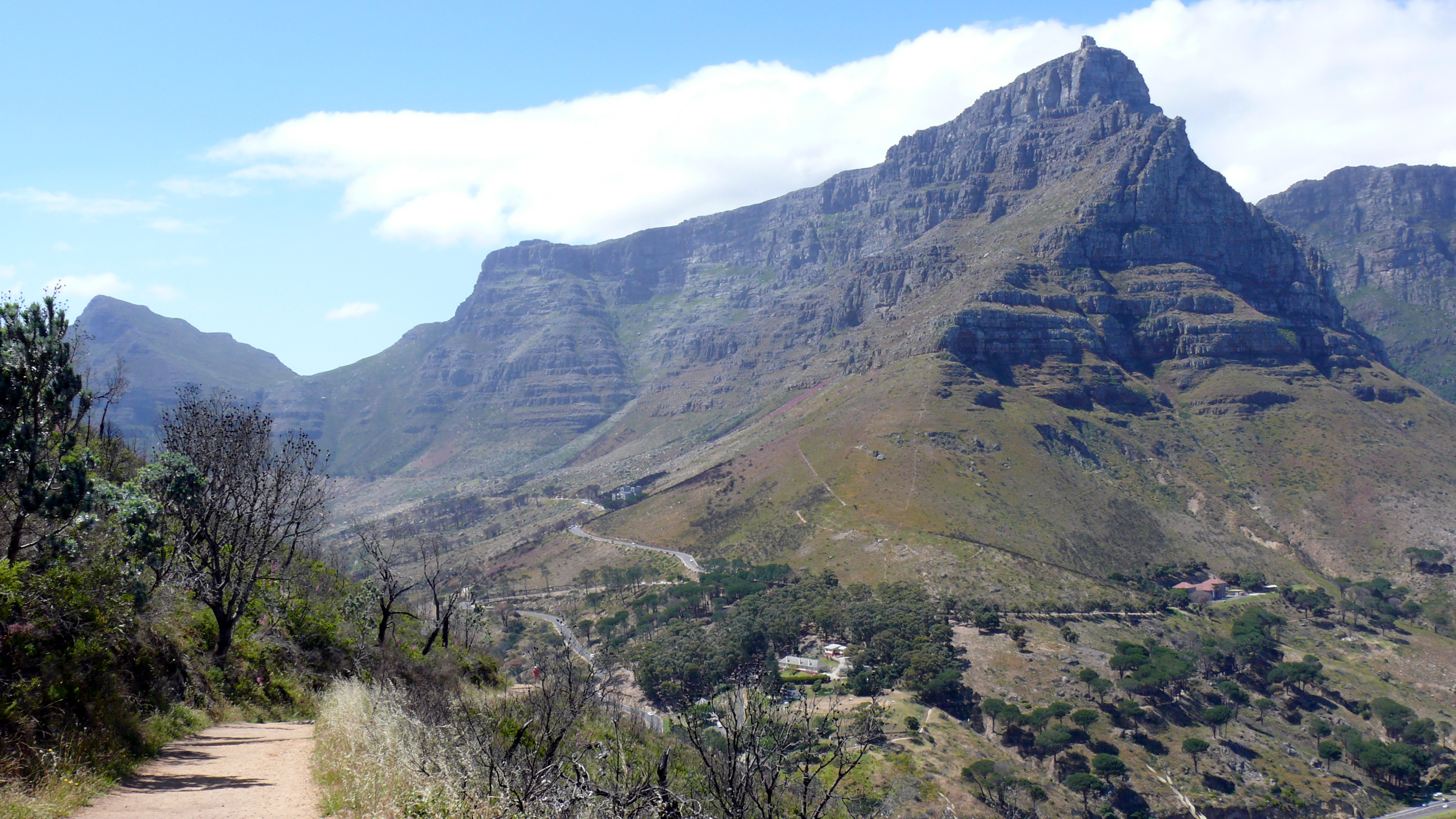
Lion's Head hike, with Table Mountain in the background

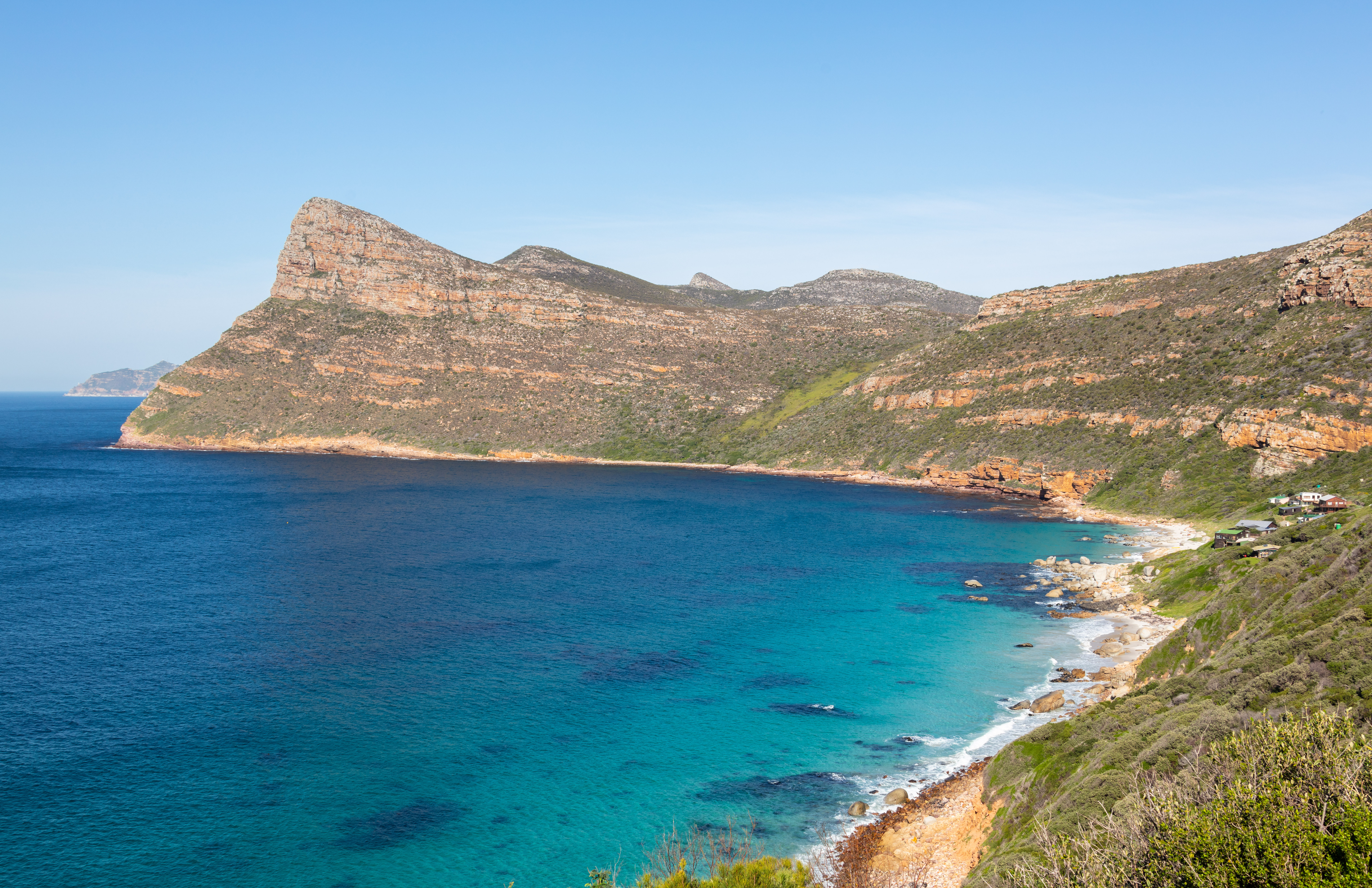
Smitswinkel Bay, between Simon's Town and Cape Point

Cape Town is home to an array of scenic nature trails and hiking routes, which are frequented by locals. Various trails offer options for walking, running, hiking, climbing, cycling, and dog-walking. Trails in public parks are maintained directly by the City of Cape Town, while many hiking trails are inside areas that are under SANParks' jurisdiction.

Popular hiking routes include Lion's Head, Kalk Bay Peak (in Silvermine), Elsie's Peak, Constantia Nek, the Pipe Track, Platteklip Gorge, Maclear's Beacon, Devil's Peak, Kasteelspoort, Tranquillity Cracks, Kloof Corner, Newlands Forest, Skeleton Gorge, Orange Kloof, Noordhoek Panorama Circuit, Noordhoek Peak, Chapman's Peak, Lighthouse Keeper's Trail, Farmer's Cliffs Trail, Tygerberg Nature Reserve, and Blaauwberg Nature Reserve.

=== Sport ===
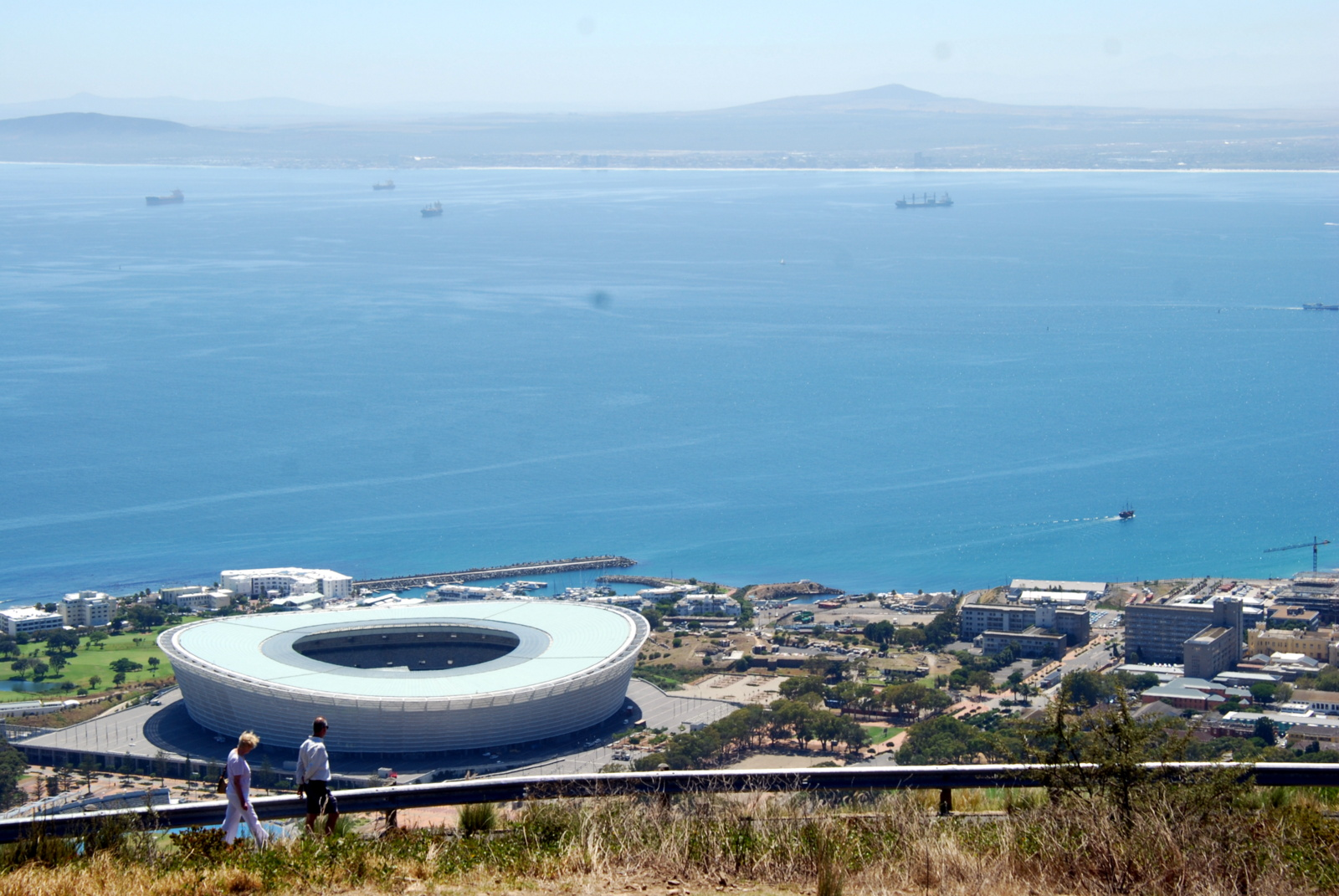
Cape Town Stadium in Green Point

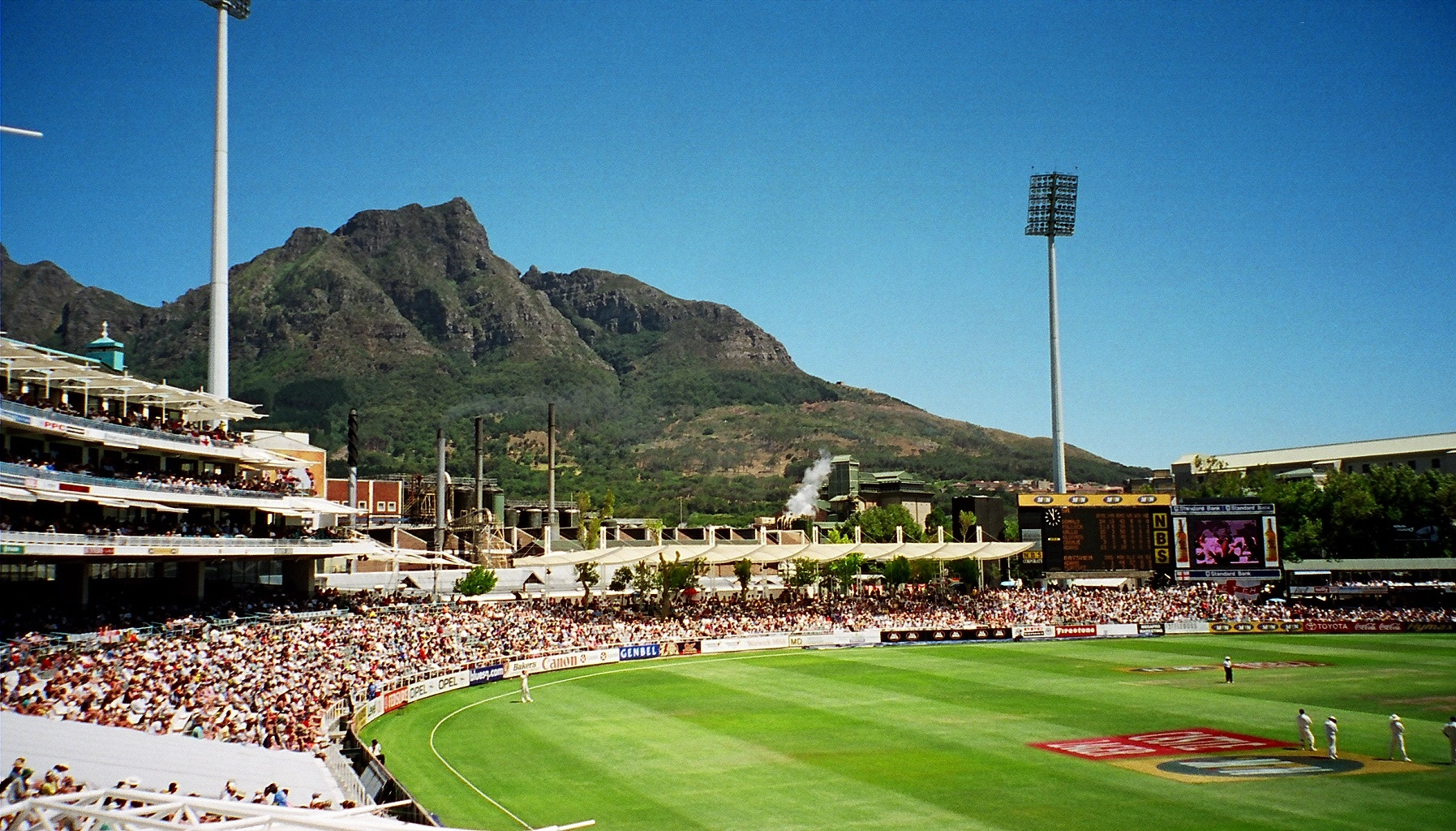
Newlands Cricket Ground

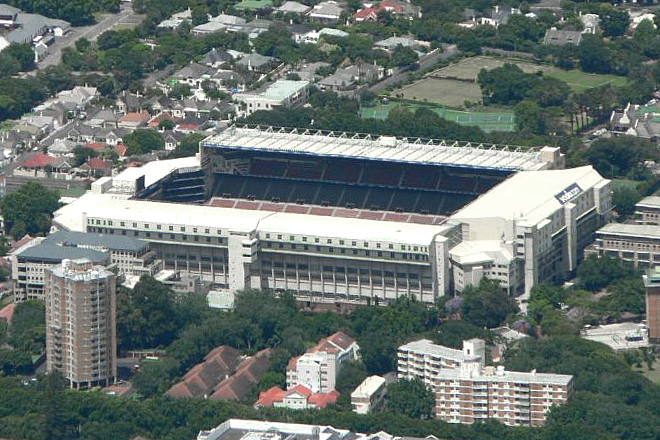
Newlands Stadium

Cape Town's most popular sports by participation are cricket, soccer, swimming, and rugby. In rugby union, Cape Town is the home of the Western Province side, who play at Cape Town Stadium and compete in the Currie Cup.

In addition, Western Province players (along with some from Wellington's Boland Cavaliers) form the Stormers in the United Rugby Championship competition. Cape Town has also been a host city for both the 1995 Rugby World Cup and 2010 FIFA World Cup, and annually hosts the Africa leg of the World Rugby 7s. Cape Town also hosted the 2023 Netball World Cup.

Association football, which is mostly known as soccer in South Africa, is also popular. Cape Town City played in the top tier Premiership until their relegation at the end of the 2024–25 season. A second major club, Cape Town Spurs, were relegated from the second tier National First Division at the end of the 2024–25 season.

Cape Town also hosted several the matches in the 2010 FIFA World Cup including a semi-final. In preparation for the World Cup, a new stadium (Cape Town Stadium) was constructed in Green Point.

In cricket, the Cape Cobras represent Cape Town at the Newlands Cricket Ground. The team is the result of an amalgamation of the Western Province Cricket and Boland Cricket teams. They take part in the Supersport and Standard Bank Cup Series. The Newlands Cricket Ground regularly hosts international matches.

Cape Town has had Olympic aspirations. For example, in 1996, Cape Town was one of the five candidate cities shortlisted by the IOC to launch official candidatures to host the 2004 Summer Olympics. Although the Games ultimately went to Athens, Cape Town came in third place.

There has been some speculation that Cape Town was seeking the South African Olympic Committee's nomination to be South Africa's bid city for the 2020 Summer Olympic Games. That was quashed when the International Olympic Committee awarded the 2020 Games to Tokyo.

The city of Cape Town has vast experience in hosting major national and international sports events. The Cape Town Cycle Tour is the world's largest individually timed road cycling race – and the first event outside Europe to be included in the International Cycling Union's Golden Bike series. It sees over 35,000 cyclists tackling a 109 km (68 mi) route around Cape Town.

The Absa Cape Epic is the largest full-service mountain bike stage race in the world. Some notable events hosted by Cape Town have included the 1995 Rugby World Cup, 2003 ICC Cricket World Cup, and World Championships in various sports such as athletics, fencing, weightlifting, hockey, cycling, canoeing, gymnastics and others.

Cape Town was also a host city to the 2010 FIFA World Cup from 11 June to 11 July 2010, further enhancing its profile as a major events city. It was also one of the host cities of the 2009 Indian Premier League cricket tournament.

The Mother City has also played host to the Africa leg of the annual World Rugby 7s event since 2015; for nine seasons, from 2002 until 2010, the event was staged in George in the Western Cape, before moving to Port Elizabeth for the 2011 edition, and then to Cape Town in 2015. The event usually takes place in mid-December, and is hosted at the Cape Town Stadium in Green Point.

There are several golf courses in Cape Town. The Clovelly Country Club and Metropolitan Golf Club have 18 holes.

=== Water-based activities ===
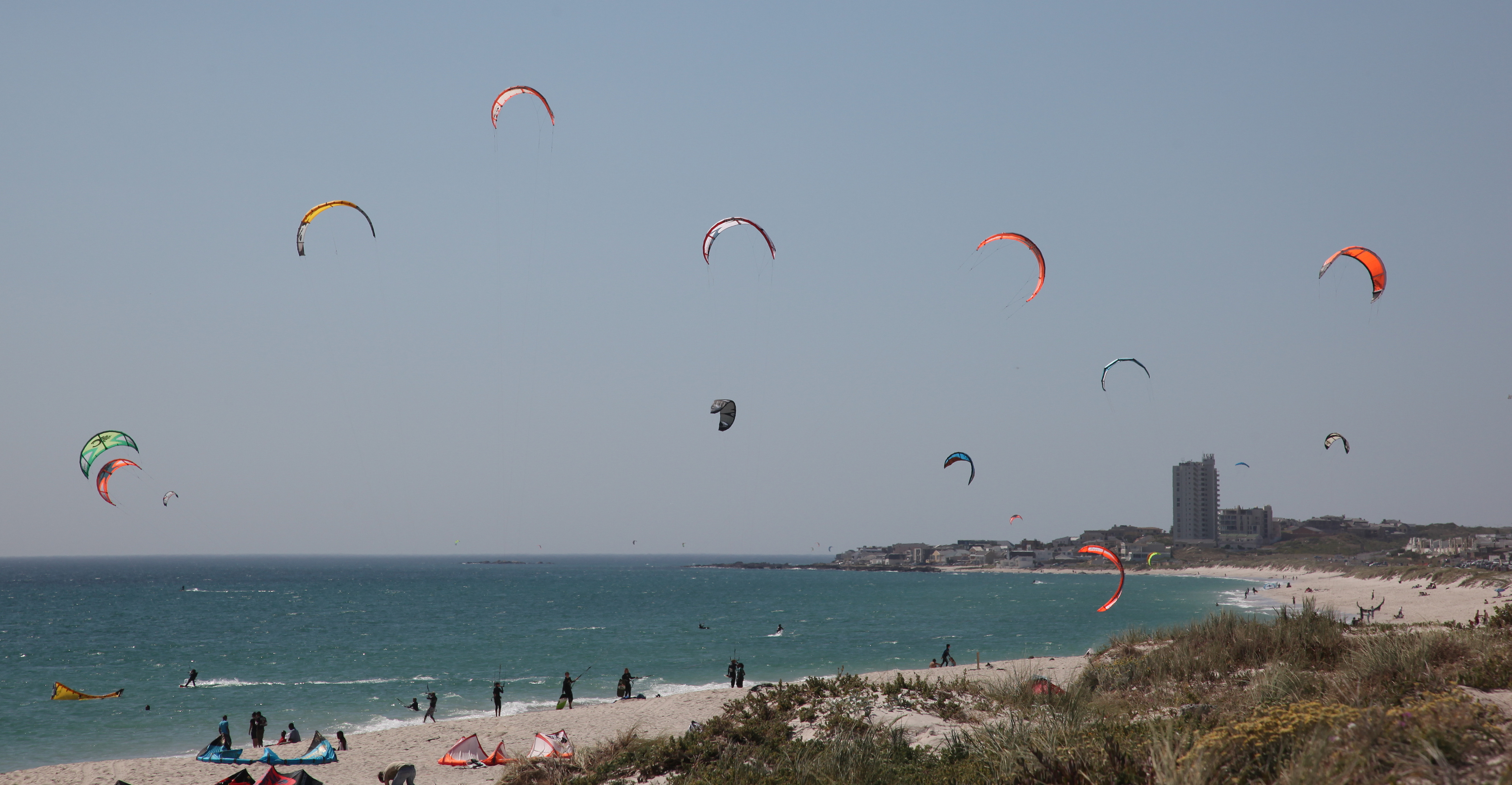
Kitesurfing in Table Bay

The coastline of Cape Town is relatively long, and the varied exposure to weather conditions makes it fairly common for water conditions to be conducive to recreational scuba diving at some part of the city's coast. There is considerable variation in the underwater environment and regional ecology as there are dive sites on reefs and wrecks on both sides of the Cape Peninsula and False Bay, split between two coastal marine ecoregions by the Cape Peninsula, and also variable by depth zone.

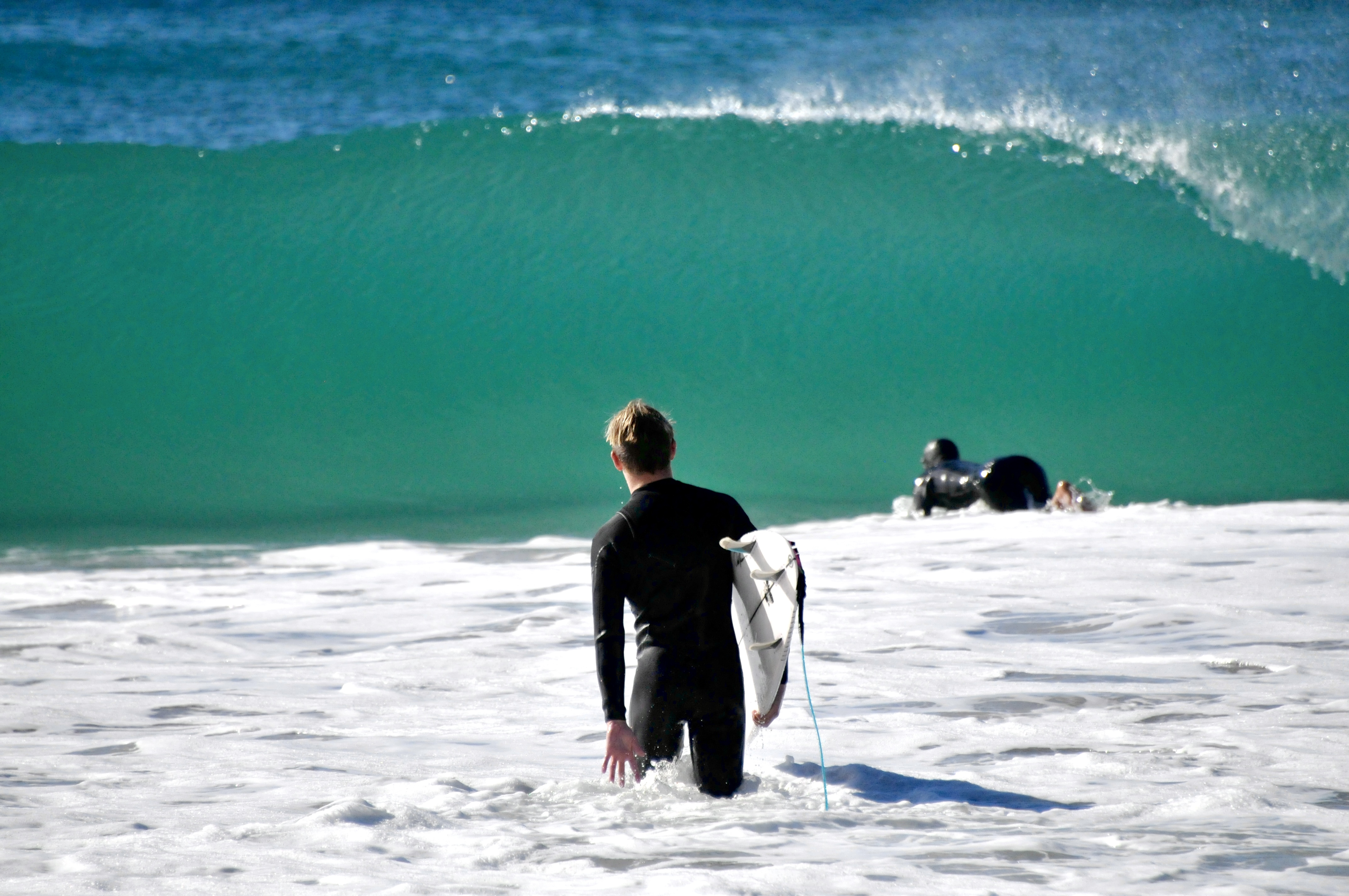
Surfing in Sandy Bay

False Bay is open to the south, and the prevailing open ocean swell arrives from the southwest, so the exposure varies considerably around the coastline. The inshore bathymetry near Cape Point is shallow enough for a moderate amount of refraction of long period swell, but deep enough to have less effect on short period swell, and acts as a filter to pass mainly the longer swell components to the Western shores, although they are significantly attenuated.

The eastern shores get more of the open ocean spectrum, and this results in very different swell conditions between the two sides at any given time. The fetch is generally too short for southeasterly winds to produce good surf. There are more than 20 named breaks in False Bay.

The north-wester can have a long fetch and can produce large waves, but they may also be associated with local wind and be very poorly sorted. The Atlantic coast is exposed to the full power of the South-westerly swell produced by the westerly winds of the southern ocean, often a long way away, so the swell has time to separate into similar wavelengths, and there are some world class big wave breaks among the named breaks of the Atlantic shore.

In the 1950s the city was part of four editions of the famous Algiers-Cape Town Rally, during the pioneer years of trans-Africa rallying and motor exploration. The closing of the road to the newly founded Zaire caused the city to be dropped from the traject.

Cape Town is also home to Zeekoevlei, a fresh water lake near the False Bay coast. Its primary use is for sailing and rowing. Zeekoevlei is the home of the Zeekoevlei Yacht Club, as well as a hand full of local schools and university rowing clubs, such as SACS, RBHS, Bishops, and UCT.

=== Libraries ===
Cape Town is home to 102 public libraries (101 fixed and 1 satellite location), operated directly by the City of Cape Town. Visitors can borrow items by registering for a library card. The city's libraries loan out books, provide access to electronic resources (via free-to-use computers connected to the internet), and facilitate community programs and events.

Located in Parade Street, close to the Cape Town City Hall, in Cape Town CBD, Central Library Cape Town is a particularly old library. Established in 1954, the library hosts books in sections including children, teens, adult, art, LGBTQIA+, and local history. The building also houses around 100 public access computers. The library contains around 200,000 items (including books, magazines, and DVDs), and has around 5,000 weekly visitors.

In 2025, the City launched a fully-digital library service, which includes access to e-books and an online catalogue that features modern and classic literature. The new system also allows for online application of library cards, to reduce queuing time at physical libraries.

=== Museums and theaters ===
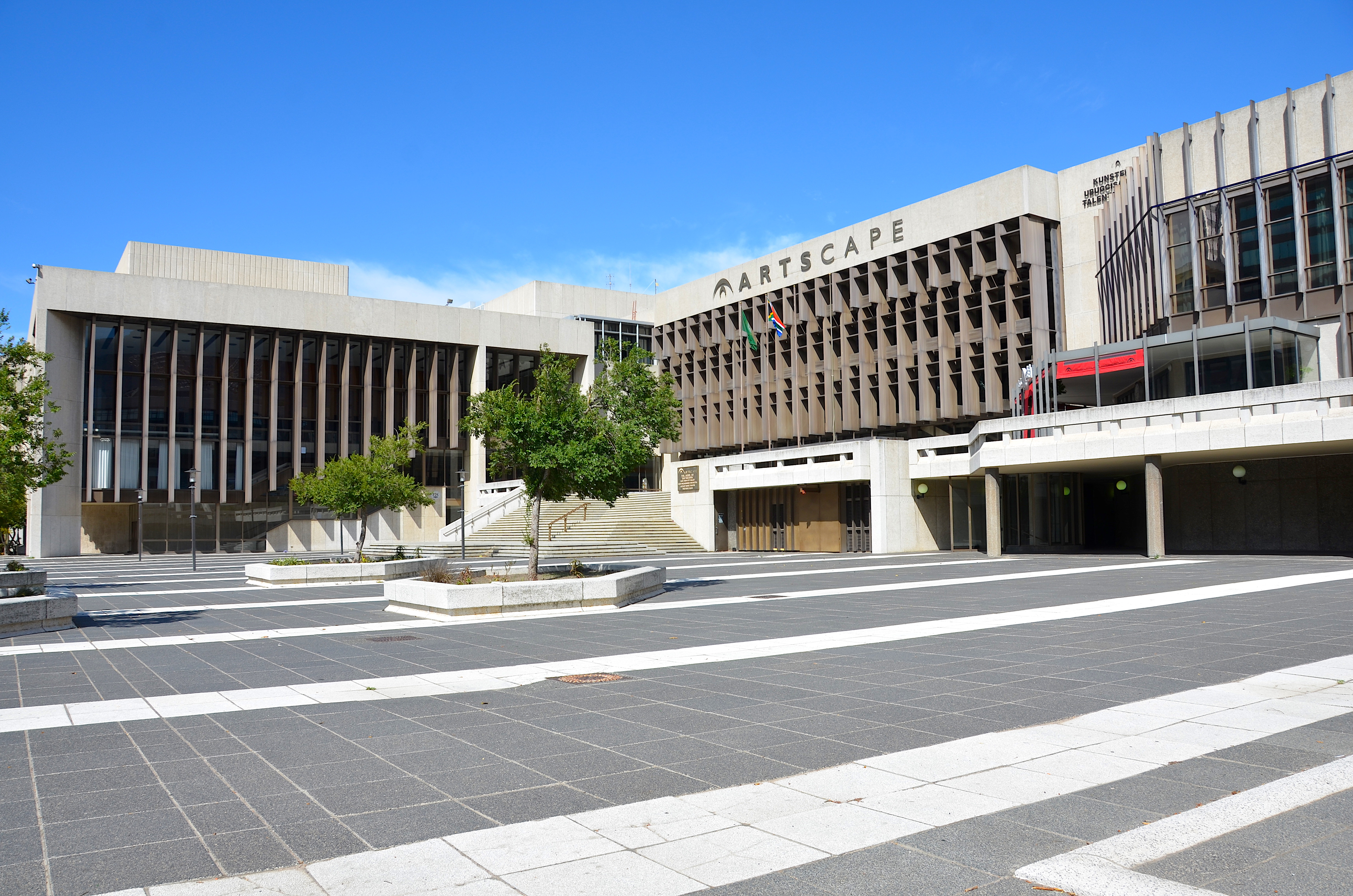
The main entrance to the Artscape Theater in Cape Town CBD

Cape Town has a rich history, and several notable cultural attractions. The District Six museum provides the public with information about the history of the Cape Coloured community and the District Six area. The Iziko South African Museum, located in Cape Town CBD, houses important African zoologic, palaeontologic, and archaeologic collections. Located on the same site as the Iziko Museum is the South African National Gallery.

Local theaters include the Artscape Theater, Baxter Theater (owned by the University of Cape Town), and the District Six Homecoming Center.

=== Car culture ===
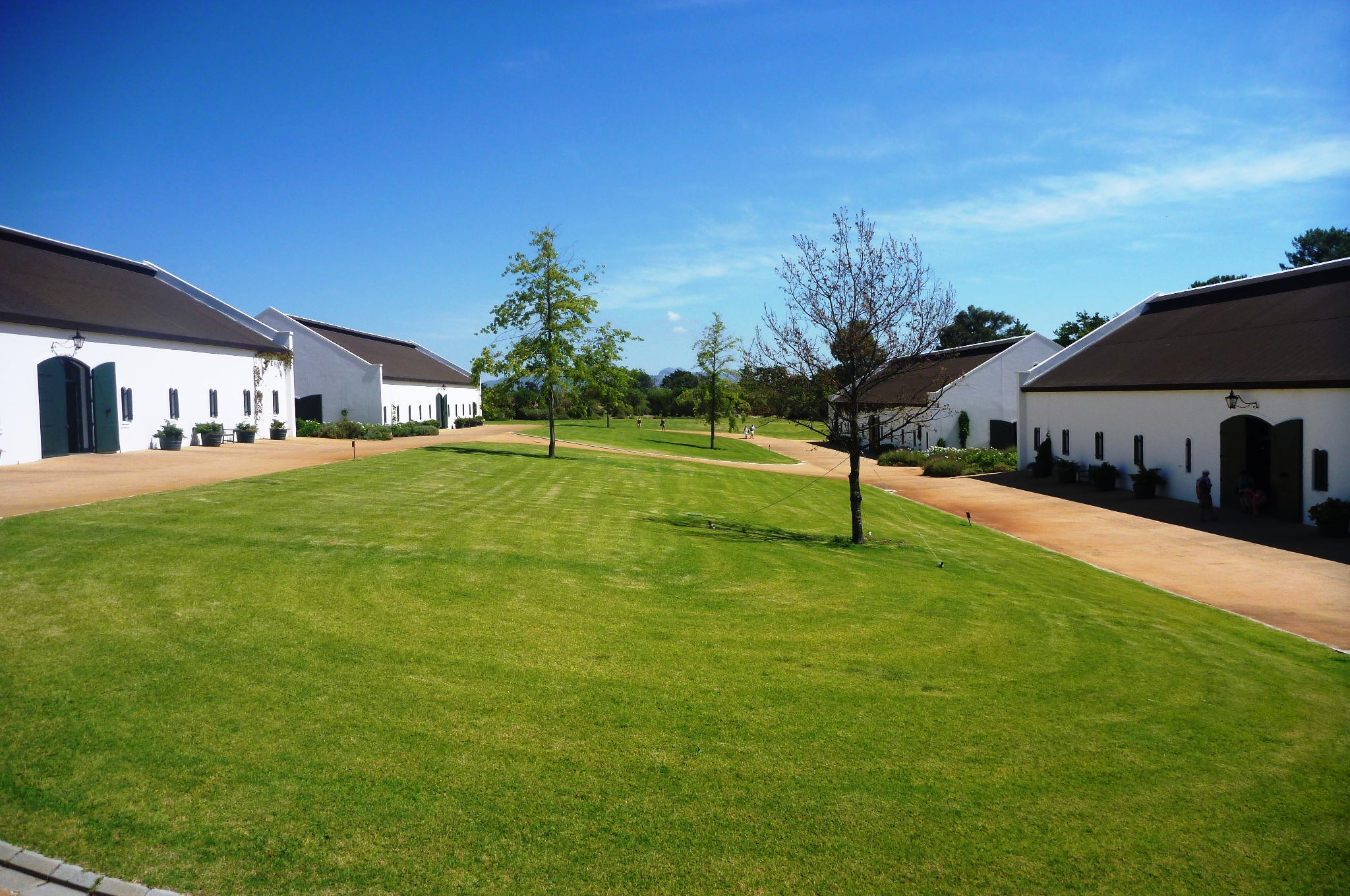
The Franschhoek Motor Museum, just outside Cape Town

Cape Town has a strong automotive culture, with numerous annual events and digital communities focused on cars. In-person events include Cars & Coffee, Speed Classic Cape Town, the V&A Waterfront Motorshow, the Classic Car and Bike Show, the Cape Town Motor Show, Things of Beauty, and Cape WheelFest. The city also hosts The Cape 1,000 grand touring rally. The Tannery Car Show takes place in nearby Wellington.

Automotive museums in and around the city include the Franschhoek Motor Museum in Franschhoek, Wijnland Auto Museum in Kraaifontein, and Tannery Cars, based in Old Tannery, in Wellington.

=== Other ===
Within Cape Town CBD, other cultural attractions include the Houses of Parliament (the seat of the South African national government), the Planetarium, and the Company's Garden (South Africa's oldest park).

== See also ==
- Cape Town Tourism – the city's official destination marketing organization
- Coffee culture in Cape Town
- LGBTQ tourism in Cape Town
- List of Cape Town suburbs
- History of Cape Town
- Timeline of Cape Town
- City of Cape Town - the local (metro) government
