= List of companies traded on the JSE =

This is a list of companies currently traded on the JSE Limited (JSE), South Africa's largest stock exchange.

== 0-9 ==
Symbol	Company	Notes	External link
4SI	4Sight Holdings Ltd	Software and Computer Services	4sight.cloud

== A ==
Symbol	Company	Notes	External link
ABG	ABSA Bank Limited	Banking	absa.co.za
APF	Accelerate Property Fund Limited	Property management	https://www.acceleratepf.co.za/
ACS	Acsion Limited		
ADI	adaptIT Holdings Limited	ICT Group, serving customers in the manufacturing, mining, higher education and financial services sectors	adaptit.co.za
AIP	Adcock Ingram Holdings Ltd	Pharmaceuticals	adcock.co.za
ADR	Adcorp Holdings Limited	Human resources, market research	adcorp.co.za
AVL	Advanced Health Limited	Real estate	
ADH	Advtech Limited	Human resources	advtech.co.za
AFE	AECI Limited	Chemicals, explosives, yarns and fibers, property	aeci.co.za
AOO	African & Overseas Enterprises Limited	Holding company; manufacturing and marketing of apparel	rextrueform.com
ADW	African Dawn Capital Limited	Finance and development of low-cost and affordable housing	africandawncapital.co.za
EPANSA	Empowerment Partnership Network Holdings Limited		
AME	African Media Entertainment Limited	Media	ame.co.za
ARI	African Rainbow Minerals	Mining: ferrous metals, base metals, platinum, coal	arm.co.za
ATI	Afristrat Investment Holdings Limited		
AFT	Afrimat Limited	Construction equipment; aggregate, readymix, dolomite, concrete products	afrimat.co.za.investosite
ACT	Afrocentric Investment Corporation Limited	Fruit; formerly known as WB Holdings Limited	afrocentric.za.com
AGI	AG Industries Limited	Fabricated glass and aluminum products for homes and skyscrapers; windows, mirrors, laminates	ag-industries.com
AHL	Ah-Vest Limited		
ALH	Alaris Holdings Limited		
AFH	Alexander Forbes Group Holdings	Financial services, risk management	alexanderforbes.com
ATN	Allied Electronics Corporation Limited	telecommunications, power management systems, information technology	Altron.com
ARC	Alphamin Resources Corporation		
ANANP	Anglo America Platinum Ltd	Platinum mining	angloamericanplatinum.com
ANAAL	Anglo American plc	Mining	angloamerican.com
ANANO	Anglogold Ashanti Limited	Subsidiary of a major global mining company	anglogoldashanti.com
ANB	Anheuser-Busch InBev	Belgian-Brazilian multinational beverage and brewing company	ab-inbev.com
ARH	ARB Holdings Limited	supplier of electrical, lighting and related industrial products to a wide range of customers and market segments across South and sub-Saharan Africa	arbhold.co.za
ACL	Arcelormittal South Africa Limited	Largest steel producer on the African continent	arcelormittalsa.com
ART	Argent Industrial Limited	Holding company, steel, steel trading, other heavy industry	argent.co.za
AWA	Arrowhead Properties Limited	Property loan stock company holding a diverse portfolio of retail, industrial and commercial buildings in secondary locations throughout South Africa	arrowheadproperties.co.za
APN	Aspen Pharmacare Holdings Limited	Pharmaceuticals, active pharmaceutical ingredients	aspenpharma.com
ARL	Astral Foods Limited	Agricultural supplies; animal feed; day-old chickens; hatching eggs	astralfoods.com
AEG	Aveng Limited	Construction, steel, equipment, engineering; heavy construction: dams, mining, civil engineering	aveng.co.za
AVI	AVI Limited	Life science, biotechnology, food	avi.co.za

== B ==
Symbol	Company	Notes	External link
	Balwin Properties Limited	REIT	
BAW	Barloworld Limited	industrial goods, motor vehicles, equipment, scientific, cement, lift trucks, coatings	barloworld.com
BSR	Basil Read Holdings Limited	civil engineering, building construction, road construction, mining services	basilread.co.za
BAU	Bauba Resources Limited	platinum exploration company	baubaplatinum.co.za
BEL	Bell Equipment Limited	agricultural equipment: agricultural dump trucks, sugar cane loaders, forklifts, backhoes, loggers, teleloggers	bellequipment.com
BIBLT	BHP Group plc	global mining	bhpbilliton.com
BVT	Bidvest Group Limited	Conglomerate of international services, trading, distribution	www.bidvest.com
BID	Bidcorp Corporation Limited	Catering supplies	bidcorpgroup.com
BLU	Blue Label Telecoms Limited	virtual distribution of secure electronic tokens of value	bluelabeltelecoms.co.za
BCF	Bowler Metcalf Limited	packaging, plastic foam	bowler.co.za
BAT	Brait S.A.	merchant bank; alternative investments	brait.com
BIK	Brikor Limited	clay bricks, aggregates	brikor.net
BRT	Brimstone Investment Corporation Limited	holding company, insurance, menswear, deep-sea fishing, Aon Holdings' subsidiary, healthcare, financial services, Nedbank subsidiary	brimstone.co.za
BTI	British American Tobacco PLC	tobacco	bat.com
	Buffalo Coal Corporation		
	Bytes Technology Group plc		

== C ==
Symbol	Company	Notes	External link
CGR	Calgro M3 Holdings	home builder	http://www.calgrom3.com
	Calulo Property Fund Limited	real estate, real estate investment; is now Moneyetla Property Fund	
CAE	Cape Empowerment Trust Limited	property, technology, printing, media	capemp.co.za
CPL	Capital Property Fund	financial services	capitalproperty.co.za
CCO	Capital & Counties Properties	real estate, asset management	capitalandcounties.com
CPI	Capitec Bank Holdings Limited	banking, consumer goods, Capitec Bank	capitecbank.co.za
CRG	Cargo Carriers Limited	trans-Southern Africa trucking, industrial trucking	cargocarriers.co.za
CSB	Cashbuild Limited	wholesale and retail building supplies	cashbuild.co.za
CAT	Caxton and CTP Publishers and Printers Limited	many local newspapers, magazines, printing, stationery	caxton.co.za
CBS	CBS Property Portfolio Limited	commercial real estate	cbs.co.za
CDZ	Cadiz Holdings Limited	financial services	cadiz.co.za
	Cenmag Holdings Limited	electromagnets, electric motors, electric goods	
CRM	Ceramic Industries Limited	tiles and sanitaryware	ceramic.co.za
	Chrometco Limited	chrome and chrome-associated minerals, mining	chrometco.co.za
CLM	City Lodge Hotels Limited	large chain of hotels	citylodge.co.za
CLE	Clientéle Life Assurance Company Limited	insurance	clientelelife.com
CLR	Clover Industries Ltd	dairy products; consumer goods	clover.co.za
CMH	Combined Motor Holdings Limited	automobile sales; holds many brand-name franchises	cmh.co.za
CMA	Command Holdings Limited	security services	command.co.za
CCL	Compu Clearing Outsourcing Limited	air cargo services	compu-clearing.co.za
CNX	Conafex Holdings Societe Anonyme	tea, health food	
	Concor Limited	building society; civil engineering	concor.co.za
CND	Conduit Capital Limited	investments involving the independent electric power industry in Latin America and the Caribbean	conduitcap.com
	Consol Limited	glass, glass goods, plastic	
CNL	Control Instruments Group Limited	automotive components, automotive electronics, automotive industry services	ci.co.za
CML	Coronation Fund Managers Limited	fund management	coronation.com
CVS	Corvus Capital (SA) Holdings Limited	financial services	corvuscapital.com
CKS	Crookes Brothers Limited	agribusiness including sugarcane, wheat, sheep, fruit	cbl.co.za
CUL	Cullinan Holdings Limited	holding company involved in tourism and leisure	cullinan.co.za

== D ==
Symbol	Company	Notes	External link
DTC	Datatec Limited	information technology, networking, IT infrastructure, IT services	datatec.co.za
DEL	Delta Property Fund Limited	REIT	
	Deneb Investments Limited		
	Deutsche Konsum REIT-AG		
	Dipula Income Fund Limited		
	Dischem Pharmacies Limited	Pharmaceutical retail chain	dischem.co.za
DSY	Discovery Holdings Limited	insurance	discovery.co.za
DST	Distell Group Limited	alcoholic beverages	distell.co.za
DRDD	DRDGOLD Limited	gold; mining and trading	drd.co.za

== E ==
Symbol	Company	Notes	External link
	Eastern Platinum Limited		
	Efora Energy Limited		
EMH	eMedia Holdings		
	enX Group Limited		
EMI	Emira Property Fund	real estate; property management: office space, retail, industrial	emira.co.za
EPE	EPE Capital Partners Limited	drugs, cosmetics	
EPP	EPP NV		
EQU	Equites Property Fund Limited	Real estate investment trust (REIT)	equities.co.za
EOH	EOH Holdings Limited	information technology, business consulting	eoh.co.za
	Erin Energy Corporation		
EUR	Europa Metals Limited	holding company, machine tools, engineering, investments	
ETI	Etion Limited		
EXX	Exxaro Resources Limited	iron ore; leading global producer	exxaro.com
EXE	Exemplar Reitail Limited	Rural and township retail developer and owner	

== F ==
Symbol	Company	Notes	External link
FTA	Fairvest Property Holdings Limited	commercial and residential property management	
FBR	Famous Brands Limited	various restaurant franchises	famousbrands.co.za
FRT	Finbond Group Limited	Financial services	
	Firestone Energy Limited	Energy	
FSR	Firstrand Limited	banking	firstrand.co.za
FOR	Fortress REIT Limited	Property Fund	
TFG	The Foschini Group	retail services, financial services	tfg.co.za
	Freedom Property Fund Limited	a property fund	

== G ==
Symbol	Company	Notes	External link
	Gemfields Group Limited	mining	
GAI	Godwill AI corp	Artificial Intelligence	Owned and founded by Lorato Manamela in 2022. https://web.theresidency.co.za
GLE	Glencore	mining	
GLO	Globe Trade Centre S.A.		
	Go Life International Limited	leisure retail environment management	glovill.co.za
GOGOF	Gold Fields Limited	mining	
	Grand Parade Investments Limited	Entertainment	
GND	Grindrod Limited	logistics	grindrod.com
	Grindrond Shipping Holdings Limited		
GRT	Growthpoint Properties Limited	leading retail, commercial and industrial property management and development company	growthpoint.co.za

== H ==
Symbol	Company	Notes	External link
HAL	Halogen Holdings Societe Anonyme	Luxembourg-based holding company, mining, gold mining	Halogen-hired web page service
HAR	Harmony Gold Mining Company Limited	mining	harmony.co.za
	Heritage Collection Holdings Limited	direct mail company, bought by New Clicks Holdings	
HVL	Highveld Steel and Vanadium Corporation Limited	metallurgy	highveldsteel.co.za
HCI	Hosken Consolidated Investments	holding company, media, entertainment, gaming, hotels, energy, bus transport	hci.co.za
HPA	Hospitality Property Fund Limited	hotel and resort property fund	hpf.co.za
BSB	The House of Busby Limited	fashion	busbyhouse.com
HWN	Howden Africa Holdings Limited	global company; industrial machinery	HowdenAfrica/
HDC	Hudaco Industries Limited	importing and distributing industrial goods, bearings and transmissions	hudaco.co.za
HWHWA	Hwange Colliery Company Limited	Zimbabwe-based coal company	hwangecolliery.co.zw
HTP	Hyprop Investments Limited	office space and shopping mall property company	hyprop.co.za

== I ==
Symbol	Company	Notes	External link
	Idion Technology Holdings Limited	suspended from trading	
IFH	IFA Hotels and Resorts Limited	hotels and resorts	
IFR	Ifour Properties Limited	delisted; financial services, real estate investment trusts	
ILA	Iliad Africa Limited	building materials and supplies	iliadafrica.co.za
ILV	Illovo Sugar Limited	Southern African sugarcane grower	illovo.co.za
IMPO	Impala Platinum Holdings Limited	mining; one of RSA's largest companies	implats.co.za
IBPL	Imperial Holdings Limited	mobility/freight, including trucking, aviation, rentals, insurance	imperial.co.za
	Imuniti Holdings	pharmaceuticals, dietary supplements, natural medicine	imuniti.co.za
	Independent Financial Services Limited	financial services	
	Indequity Group Limited	insurance and financial services	
	Industrial Credit Company Africa Holdings Limited	high-end industrial equipment and vehicle leasing	
IFW	Infowave Holdings Limited	information technology	infowave.co.za/
	Integrear Limited	financial services, professional services	
ILT	Interconnective Solutions Limited	telecommunications services	
ITR	Intertrading Limited	agriculture and fishery	
	Investec Bank Limited – Preference Share	Financial services	investec.com
INL	Investec Limited	financial services - dual listing	investec.com
INP	Investec	financial services - cross listed	investec.com
IVT	Invicta Holdings Limited	import and distribution of machinery, equipment, motors and components for the agriculture, construction and golf industries	invictaholdings.co.za
IPS	IPSA Group	electricity generation	ipsagroup.co.uk
ISA	ISA Holdings Limited	security software, information security architects	isaholdings.co.za
ITE	Italtile Limited	ceramic tile, sanitaryware, bathroom accessory retail	italtile.com
ITXUK	Itrix CIS		

== J ==
Symbol	Company	Notes	External link
JSC	Jasco Electronics Holdings Limited	electronics manufacture including telecom towers and ancillary equipment; electrical cables and security equipment	jasco.co.za
JSE	JSE Limited	the Johannesburg Stock Exchange itself	jse.co.za
JNC	Jubilee Metals Group plc	platinum, nickel, copper exploration and mining	jubileeplatinum.com

== K ==
Symbol	Company	Notes	External link
	Kaap Agri Limited	Agriculture	
KAP	KAP International Holdings Limited	holding company: meat, leather, automotive, resin (plastic)	kapinternational.com
	Kibo Energy plc		
	Kore Potash plc		
KIO	Kumba Iron Ore Limited	iron ore; merged to form Exxaro	exxaro.com

== L ==
Symbol	Company	Notes	External link
LAB	Labat Africa Limited	integrated circuit manufacture	
	Liberty Two Degrees Limited	Property	
LEW	Lewis Group Limited	furniture and home appliance retail	
LBH	Liberty Holdings Limited	the holding company for Liberty Life, an insurance company	liberty.co.za
LHC	Life Healthcare Group	Private sector healthcare and hospitals	lifehealthcare.co.za
LNF	London Finance & Investment Group plc	financial services	
LON	Long4life Limited		
LUX	Luxe Holdings Limited	luxury goods	
	Lighthouse Capital Limited		
LBR	Libstar Holdings Limited		

== M ==
Symbol	Company	Notes	External link
MCU	M Cubed Holdings Limited	financial services	
MDN	Madison Property Fund Managers Holdings Ltd		
MKL	Makalani Holdings Limited	holding company; finance	
MSS	Marshalls Limited	commercial and light industrial property; parking garages	
MAS	Masonite (Africa) Limited	forestry, construction materials	
MSM	Massmart Holdings Limited	retail	
MTZ	Matodzi Resources Limited	diamonds in Lesotho	
MDC	Mediclinic Group	Private sector healthcare and hospitals	mediclinic.com
MRF	Merafe Resources Limited	mining, metallurgy, chromium	
MTL	Mercantile Bank Holdings Limited		
MTA	Metair Investments Limited	motor vehicle components for the vehicle assembly industry	
MML	Metmar Limited	direct mail, logistics	
MEMTX	Metorex Limited	mining, support to the mining industry	
MFL	Metrofile Holdings Limited	information management, document management, archiving	
MMG	Micromega Holdings Limited	financial services, information technology, automotive	
MMH	Miranda Mineral Holdings Limited	prospecting: diamonds, coal, gold, silver, base metals	
MLA	Mittal Steel South Africa	Arcelor-Mittal, a global steel company	
MMI	MMI Holdings Limited	life insurance, employee benefits, medical scheme, health insurance, asset management	mmiholdings.co.za
MOB	Mobile Industries Limited	marine cargo industry, including beer kegs, transponders and software solutions	
MMH	Momentum Group Limited	Financial services	
MTH	Motus Holdings	Non-manufacturing automotive	
MNY	Moneyweb Holdings Limited	financial information	
MTE	Monteagle Holdings Societe Anonyme		
MPC	Mr Price Group Limited	apparel, homewares	
MTN	MTN Group Limited	telecom	
MUR	Murray & Roberts		
MST	Mustek Limited	personal computer assembly	
MVG	Mvelaphanda Group Limited	industrial support services (food, transport, etc.), including the mining industry	
MVL	Mvelaphanda Resources Limited	mining and exploration, including gold, platinum, manganese, diamonds	
MVS	Mvelaserve Ltd	business support, security, catering, manufacturing, freight	mvelaserve.co.za

== N ==
Symbol	Company	Notes	External link
NPK	Nampak Limited	packaging	
NPN	Naspers Limited	pay tv	
NED	Nedbank Group Limited	banking	
NBKP	Nedbank Limited-Preference Shares		
NTC	Netcare	healthcare	
NAI	New African Investments Limited	car rental, publishing, radio, film, television	
NCA	New Corpcapital Limited	brokerage	
NCS	Nictus Beperk	automobile wholesale	
NHM	Northam Platinum Limited	mining	
NWL	Nu-World Holdings Limited	import and manufacture of furniture, consumer electronics, home appliances	

== O ==
Symbol	Company	Notes	External link
OAO	Oando plc	Nigeria based; oil, natural gas, refining, energy	oandoplc.com
OAS	Oasis Crescent Property Fund	Sharia-principled real estate investment company with offices in Egypt, Ireland and South Africa	oasiscrescent.com
OCE	Oceana Group Limited	commercial fishing, fish processing; potatoes; cold storage for fish, fruit	oceana.co.za
OCT	Octodec Investments Limited	real estate	octodec.co.za
OML	Old Mutual plc	financial services	oldmutual.com
OMN	Omnia Holdings Limited	chemicals, specialty chemicals, fertilizer, bulk mining, explosives	omnia.co.za
OLG	Onelogix Group Limited	logistics	
OPT	Orion Minerals Limited	mining	

== P ==
Symbol	Company	Notes	External link
PAR	Pan African Resources plc	coal mining	
PBT	PBT Group Limited		
PEM	Pembury Lifestyle Group Limited		
PEP	Pepkor Holdings Limited	Retail	
PIK	Pick ‘n Pay Stores Limited	Retail	
PPC	PPC Limited	cement, limestone	ppc.africa
PRE	Premier Fishing and Brands Limited	Foods	
PMV	Primeserv Group Limited	human resources services; vocational training, business colleges	primeserv.co.za
PRO	Prosus N.V.	Technology	
KST	PSG Financial Services	financial services	
PPE	Purple Group Limited	financial services	purplegroup.co.za
PPR	Putprop Limited	property	

== Q ==
Symbol	Company	Notes	External link
QFH	Quantum Foods Holdings Limited	Confectionery	
QUI	Quilter plc		

== R ==
Symbol	Company	Notes	External link
RACP	RECM & Calibre Ltd	financial services, fund management	recm.co.za
RBW	Rainbow Chicken Limited	chicken, frozen food, wide variety of chicken products	rainbowchickens.co.za
RMIJ	Rand Merchant Investment Holdings	financial services, fund management	rminsurance.co.za
RBX	Raubex Group	road construction, infrastructure	raubex.co.za
RAH	Real Africa Holdings Limited	holding company; food and healthcare	
RDF	Redefine Income Fund Limited	financial services, property holding, investments	redefine.co.za
RIN	Redefine Properties International Ltd	financial services	redefineinternational.com
REM	Remgro Limited	financial services, investments, industry, tobacco, mining	remgro.com
RES	Resilient Property Income Fund Limited	property development; retail property; shopping malls	resilient.co.za
RSG	Resource Generation Ltd	energy resources, coal, mining	resgen.com.au
RLO	Reunert Limited	electronics, low-voltage electrical engineering and manufacturing	reunert.co.za/2008/
RTN	Rex Trueform Clothing Company Limited	men's and women's clothing	rextrueform.com
CFR	Richemont Securities AG	watches, jewellery, luxury goods	richemont.com
RMH	RMB Holdings Limited	financial services, banking, insurance; a holding company for financial services companies	rmbh.co.za
RBP	Royal Bafokeng Platinum Ltd	mining	bafokengplatinum.co.za

== S ==
Symbol	Company	Notes	External link
SBL	Sable Holdings Limited	property, hotels, trading, automotive accessories	
SAB	SABMiller Plc	beer, soft drinks, global leader	sabmiller.com
SBV	Sabvest Limited	investments	sabvest.com
SAL	Sallies Limited	mining, fluorspar	
SLM	Sanlam Limited	financial services, insurance	sanlam.co.za
SNT	Santam Limited	insurance	santam.co.za
SNV	Santova Limited	logistics	santova.com
SAP	Sappi Limited	paper and pulp; a global company	sappi.com
SFN	Sasfin Holdings Limited	banking, commercial banking	sasfin.com
SOL	Sasol Limited	energy, chemicals, fuels; coal-to-liquid processing, gas-to-liquid processing	sasol.com/sasol_internet/
SCN	Scharrig Mining Limited	see Sentula Mining	
SER	Seardel Investment Corporation	clothing manufacture; textile manufacture; electronic goods and toys	seardel.co.za
SDH	SecureData	information security; information risk management	securedata.co.za
SKJ	Sekunjalo Investments Limited	investment in industry	sekunjalo.com
SNU	Sentula Mining	mining; metals, coal, mining services; formerly Scharrig Mining	sentula.co.za
SEP	Sephaku Holdings	cement	www.sephakuholdings.co.za
STO	Set Point Technology Holdings Limited	industrial technology; axles, wheels, meters, pumps, engineering supplies	setpoint.co.za
SHP	Shoprite Holdings Limited	supermarkets, furniture retail, convenience stores	shoprite.co.za
SBG	Simeka BSG Limited	software; desktop and server management including computer hardware, infrastructure and applications	simekabusinessgroup.co.za
SIM	Simmer & Jack Mines Ltd	uranium, gold	simmers.co.za
SYA	Siyathenga Property Fund Limited	merged with another company; is not now listed	
SLO	Southern Electricity Company Limited	electricity generation in Namibia and South Africa	selco.co.za
SOV	Sovereign Food Investments Limited	food, chickens, animal feed	sovfoods.co.za
SPA	Spanjaard Limited	lubricants and chemicals, specialized lubricants; a global company	spanjaardltd.com
SPP	The Spar Group Ltd	wholesaler, distributor, goods, services, liquor	spar.co.za
SPS	Spescom Limited	information technology, communications technology; speech and voice technology	spescom.co.za
SUR	Spur Corporation Limited	steakhouse; Spur Steak Ranch restaurant chain	spur.co.za
SQE	Square One Solutions Group Limited	information technology; bar coding; security	squareonegroup.co.za
SBK	Standard Bank Group Limited	Financial services	standardbank.co.za
SLL	Stella Vista Technologies Ltd	large-scale multimedia systems including systems for train stations and airports, sports event video display systems, scoreboards	stellavista.com
SSS	Stor-Age Property REIT	self storage	stor-age.co.za/
STA	Stratcorp Limited	financial services, financial products including real estate-based financial products	stratcorp.co.za
SUI	Sun International Limited	Hospitality, Gambling	
SPG	Super Group Limited	industrial transportation and logistics in Africa and the Indian Ocean area	supergroup.co.za
SYC	Sycom Property Fund Managers Limited	financial services; a closed-end property unit trust	sycom.co.za

== T ==
Symbol	Company	Notes	External link
TAW	Tawana Resources NL	Australia-based diamond exploration company	tawana.com.au
TKG	Telkom SA Limited	Telecommunication	telkom.co.za
TBX	Thabex Exploration Limited	diamonds, coal, gold	thabex.com
TBS	Tiger Brands Limited	food, healthcare, pharmaceuticals, fisheries	tigerbrands.co.za
TON	Tongaat Hulett Sugar	sugar, property development, agricultural development, starch, aluminum	tongaat.co.za
TDH	Tradehold Limited	a department store of the RSA and the UK	tradehold.co.za
TCP	Transaction Capital	"credit-orientated alternative assets": taxi finance and insurance, and specialised collections	transactioncapital.co.za
TPC	Transpaco Limited	paper and plastic packaging materials	transpaco.co.za
TMT	Trematon Capital Investments Limited	financial services, investment trust	
TRE	Trencor Limited	owning, leasing and managing marine cargo containers	trencor.net
TTO	Trustco Group Holdings Ltd	micro-insurance, financial services, short-term insurance, life cover, mobile, IT	tgi.na
TRU	Truworths International Limited	fashion, apparel, retail, fashion brands	truworths.co.za
TEX	Texton Property Fund Limited		
TGA	Thungela Resources Limited	mining	
THA	Tharisa plc		
TLM	Telemaster Holdings		
TMT	Trematon Capital Inv Limited		
TRL	Trellidor Hldgs Limited	security	
TSG	Tsogo Sun Limited		

== U ==
Symbol	Company	Notes	External link
UPL	Universal Partners Limited		

== V ==
Symbol	Company	Notes	External link
VLE	Value Group Limited	mobility/logistics, cargo handling, trucking, auto rental, refrigerated trucks	
VIS	Visual International Holdings Limited		
VOD	Vodacom Group Limited	mobile, communications, multi-national	vodacom.com
VKE	Vukile Property Fund Limited	retail real estate investment and development	
VUN	Vunani Ltd	financial services, investment services, fund management, investment banking	vunanilimited.co.za

== W ==
Symbol	Company	Notes	External link
WBO	WBHO	Construction	
WBC	WeBuyCars	Non-manufacturing automotive	
WSL	Wescoal Holdings Limited	coal producer	
WEZ	Wesizwe Platinum Limited	platinum exploration and mining	
WEA	WG Wearne Limited	concrete and aggregates	
WBO	Wilson Bayly Holmes - Ovcon Limited	home construction, building construction	
WKF	Workforce Holdings Limited		
WHL	Woolworths Holdings Limited	Woolworths, clothing, food, homeware, beauty, financial services	woolworthsholdings.co.za

== Y ==
Symbol	Company	Notes	External link
YRK	York Timber Holdings Limited	Timber	

== Z ==
Symbol	Company	Notes	External link
ZED	Zeder Investments Limited		
	Zaclear Holdings Limited		
ZZD	Zeda Limited		

== See also ==
- Category:Companies of South Africa
- JSE Limited
- List of African stock exchanges
