= List of largest companies in South Africa =

This article lists the largest companies in South Africa in terms of their revenue, net profit, total assets and market capitalization, according to the American business magazine Forbes and French news magazine Jeune Afrique.

== 2022 Jeune Afrique list ==
Below are the 50 largest companies in South Africa by revenue in 2022 (mostly for their respective 2021 fiscal years), with data from Jeune Afrique.

Rank	Company	Revenue (US$ millions)	Profits (US$ millions)	Industry	Headquarters city	Headquarters province
1	Eskom	13,941	−1,292	Electric utility	Sandton	Gauteng
2	Sasol	12,989	−6,272	Chemistry	Sandton	Gauteng
3	MTN	12,238	1,341	Telecommunications	Johannesburg	Gauteng
4	Shoprite	10,802	230	Retail	Cape Town	Western Cape
5	Steinhoff International	9,704	−2,910	Holding	Stellenbosch	Western Cape
6	Anglo American Platinum	9,402	2,074	Mining	Johannesburg	Gauteng
7	Sibanye Gold	8,692	2,089	Mining	Johannesburg	Gauteng
8	Spar	8,479	134	Retail	uMhlanga	KwaZulu-Natal
9	Bidcorp	8,227	78	Agroindustry	Sandton	Gauteng
10	Vodacom Group	6,707	1,165	Telecommunications	Midrand	Gauteng
11	Pick n Pay	6,351	66	Retail	Cape Town	Western Cape
12	Naspers	5,934	3,404	Holding	Cape Town	Western Cape
13	Massmart	5,920	−120	Retail	Sandton	Gauteng
14	Kumba Iron Ore	5,466	2,036	Mining	Centurion	Gauteng
15	Vodacom South Africa	5,236	...	Telecommunications	Midrand	Gauteng
16	Bidvest	5,233	−13	Holding	Johannesburg	Gauteng
17	Motus	5,009	13	Automotive	Germiston	Gauteng
18	Woolworths	4,927	38	Retail	Cape Town	Western Cape
19	Impala Platinum	4,766	1,125	Mining	Johannesburg	Gauteng
20	Sappi	4,609	−135	Pulp and paper	Johannesburg	Gauteng
21	Transnet	4,590	−572	Transport	Johannesburg	Gauteng
22	Engen	4,555	−257	Oil and gas	Cape Town	Western Cape
23	AngloGold Ashanti	4,427	971	Mining	Johannesburg	Gauteng
24	Pepkor	4,300	...	Holding	Cape Town	Western Cape
24	Datatec	4,110	6	Information technology	Johannesburg	Gauteng
26	Mediclinic	4,066	284	Healthcare	Stellenbosch	Western Cape
27	Gold Fields	3,982	745	Mining	Johannesburg	Gauteng
28	Remgro	3,734	449	Holding	Stellenbosch	Western Cape
29	MultiChoice	3,693	278	Telecommunications	Randburg	Gauteng
30	Barloworld	3,390	−171	Conglomerate	Sandton	Gauteng
31	Massmart Wholesale	3,246	...	Wholesale	Sandton	Gauteng
32	Imperial Logistics	3,165	−15	Conglomerate	Germiston	Gauteng
34	Telkom	2,949	179	Telecommunications	Centurion	Gauteng
35	WBHO	2,939	−35	Construction	Johannesburg	Gauteng
36	Transnet Freight Rail	2,692	...	Transport	Johannesburg	Gauteng
37	Massmart Retail	2,654	...	Retail	Sandton	Gauteng
38	Aspen	2,637	315	Pharmaceuticals	uMhlanga	KwaZulu-Natal
39	Clicks	2,463	128	Retail	Cape Town	Western Cape
40	Foschini Group	2,428	−127	Retail	Cape Town	Western Cape
41	Super Group	2,359	−11	Transport	Germiston	Gauteng
42	RCL Foods	2,162	68	Agroindustry	Westville	KwaZulu-Natal
43	Tiger Brands	2,033	71	Agroindustry	Sandton	Gauteng
44	Harmony Gold	1,995	−58	Mining	Johannesburg	Gauteng
45	Exxaro	1,974	716	Mining	Centurion	Gauteng
46	Lonmin	1,833	947	Mining	Johannesburg	Gauteng
47	Dis-Chem	1,793	47	Healthcare	Midrand	Gauteng
48	Life Healthcare Group	1,732	3	Healthcare	Johannesburg	Gauteng
49	ArcelorMittal	1,681	−333	Steel	Vanderbijlpark	Gauteng
50	AECI	1,645	11	Chemicals	Sandton	Gauteng

== 2019 Forbes list ==
This list is based on the Forbes Global 2000, which ranks the world's 2,000 largest publicly traded companies. The Forbes list takes into account a multitude of factors, including the revenue, net profit, total assets and market value of each company; each factor is given a weighted rank in terms of importance when considering the overall ranking. The table below also lists the headquarters location and industry sector of each company. The figures are in billions of US dollars and are for the year 2019. All 14 companies from South Africa in the Forbes 2000 are listed.

*Despite the company being South African with Head Offices in South Africa, the company is listed as British by the Forbes 2000 ranking due to the entity's registered address in London.

	Forbes 2000 rank	Name	Headquarters	Revenue (billions US$)	Profit (billions US$)	Assets (billions US$)	Value (billions US$)	Industry
1	261	Anglo American	Johannesburg*	27.6	3.6	52.2	35.9	Diversified Metals & Mining
2	415	Standard Bank	Johannesburg	9.0	2.1	147.9	22.9	Banking
3	418	Naspers	Cape Town	6.9	13.5	35.8	111.3	Media
4	445	First Rand	Johannesburg	7.6	2.3	110.5	27.2	Banking
5	530	Sasol	Johannesburg	14.8	1.3	32.8	21.0	Oil and Gas
6	661	Absa Group Limited	Johannesburg	9.7	1.1	89.6	9.9	Finance
7	755	Nedbank	Johannesburg	7.7	1.0	72.6	9.4	Banking
8	782	Old Mutual	Sandton	8.2	1.1	60.7	8.3	Finance
9	818	Sanlam	Bellville	5.8	0.9	55.9	12.4	Insurance
10	936	MTN Group	Johannesburg	10.2	0.66	17.0	13.5	Telecommunications
11	1764	Investec	Johannesburg	6.0	0.72	73.2	6.3	Investment Services
12	1764	RMB Holdings	Johannesburg	4.0	0.7	3.6	8.3	Finance
13	1881	Shoprite Holdings	Brackenfell	11.0	0.3	4.7	7.0	Retail
14	1981	Bidvest Group	Johannesburg	9.4	0.3	4.4	7.2	Finance

== See also ==
- List of companies of South Africa
- List of largest companies by revenue
- List of largest companies in Africa by revenue
- Retailing in South Africa
