= List of largest companies in Africa by revenue =

This list comprises the largest companies currently in Africa by revenue as of 2022, excluding the finance sector, according to the ranking of the largest 500 companies in Africa by Jeune Afrique.

In 2022, the largest company in Africa was Sonatrach with revenue of US$77 billion.

== List ==
Below are the 100 largest companies by revenue in 2022 (mostly for fiscal year 2021).

Rank	Company	Industry	Revenue (US$ billions)	Headquarters
1	Sonatrach	Oil and gas	77.013	Algeria
2	Eskom	Electric utility	13.941	South Africa
3	Sasol	Chemistry	12.989	South Africa
4	MTN Group	Telecommunications	12.238	South Africa
5	Shoprite Holdings	Retail	10.802	South Africa
6	Nigeria National Petroleum	Oil and gas	9.706	Nigeria
7	Steinhoff International	Holding	9.704	South Africa
8	Anglo American Platinum	Mining	9.402	South Africa
9	Sibanye Gold	Mining	8.692	South Africa
10	Spar Group	Retail	8.479	South Africa
11	Bidcorp	Agroindustry	8.227	South Africa
12	Vodacom Group	Telecommunications	6.707	South Africa
13	Pick n Pay Stores	Retail	6.351	South Africa
14	Nigeria Liquefied Natural Gas	Oil and gas	6.315	Nigeria
15	OCP Group	Mining	6.237	Morocco
16	Naspers	Holding	5.934	South Africa
17	Massmart	Retail	5.920	South Africa
18	Suez Canal Authority	Transport	5.600	Egypt
19	Kumba Iron Ore	Mining	5.466	South Africa
20	Sonangol Group	Oil and gas	5.332	Angola
21	Vodacom South Africa	Telecommunications	5.236	South Africa
22	Bidvest Group	Holding	5.233	South Africa
23	Motus	Automotive	5.009	South Africa
24	Woolworths South Africa	Retail	4.927	South Africa
25	Impala Platinum	Mining	4.766	South Africa
26	Sappi	Pulp and paper	4.609	South Africa
27	Transnet	Transport	4.590	South Africa
28	Engen Petroleum	Oil and gas	4.555	South Africa
29	AngloGold Ashanti	Mining	4.427	South Africa
30	Pepkor	Holding	4.300	South Africa
31	Datatec	Information technology	4.110	South Africa
32	Office national d'électricité	Electric utility	4.093	Morocco
33	Groupe Maroc Telecom	Telecommunications	4.082	Morocco
34	Mediclinic International	Healthcare	4.066	South Africa
35	Gold Fields	Mining	3.982	South Africa
36	Remgro	Holding	3.734	South Africa
37	MultiChoice	Telecommunications	3.693	South Africa
38	MTN Nigeria	Telecommunications	3.514	Nigeria
39	Barloworld Limited	Conglomerate	3.390	South Africa
40	Orascom Construction	Construction	3.371	Egypt
41	Naftal	Oil and gas	3.283	Algeria
42	Massmart Wholesale	Wholesale	3.246	South Africa
43	Imperial Logistics	Conglomerate	3.165	South Africa
44	Ethiopian Airlines	Airline	6.118	Ethiopia
45	MTN South Africa	Telecommunications	3.103	South Africa
46	Telkom	Telecommunications	2.949	South Africa
47	Elsewedy Electric	Energy	2.943	Egypt
48	Wilson Bayly Holmes-Ovcon	Construction	2.939	South Africa
49	Afriquia	Oil and gas	2.833	Morocco
50	Dangote Cement	Cement	2.699	Nigeria
51	Transnet Freight Rail	Transport	2.692	South Africa
52	Nigerian Petroleum Development	Oil and gas	2.686	Nigeria
53	Massmart Retail	Retail	2.654	South Africa
54	Aspen Pharmacare	Pharmaceuticals	2.637	South Africa
55	Clicks Group	Retail	2.463	South Africa
56	Ezz Steel	Steel	2.450	Egypt
57	Middle East Oil Refineries	Oil and gas	2.429	Egypt
58	Foschini Group	Retail	2.428	South Africa
59	Safaricom	Telecommunications	2.403	Kenya
60	Super Group	Transport	2.359	South Africa
61	Qalaa Holdings	Finance	2.281	Egypt
62	Sonatel	Telecommunications	2.255	Senegal
63	Maroc Telecom	Telecommunications	2.252	Morocco
64	RCL Foods	Agroindustry	2.162	South Africa
65	Al-Ezz Dekheila Steel Co.	Steel	2.153	Egypt
66	Etisalat Marocco	Telecommunications	2.024	Morocco
67	Tiger Brands	Agroindustry	2.033	South Africa
68	Telecom Egypt	Telecommunications	2.024	Egypt
69	Egyptair	Transport	2.015	Egypt
70	Flour Mills of Nigeria	Agroindustry	2.014	Nigeria
71	Harmony Gold	Mining	1.995	South Africa
72	Exxaro	Mining	1.974	South Africa
73	Tunisian Company of Electricity and Gas	Electric utility	1.949	Tunisia
74	Vodafone Egypt	Telecommunications	1.888	Egypt
75	Dangote Cement Nigeria	Cement	1.879	Nigeria
76	Petroleum Projects and Consulting	Oil and gas	1.840	Egypt
77	Marikana	Mining	1.833	South Africa
78	Dis-Chem	Healthcare	1.793	South Africa
79	Life Healthcare Group	Healthcare	1.732	South Africa
80	Société tunisienne des industries de raffinage	Oil and gas	1.683	Tunisia
81	ArcelorMittal South Africa	Steel	1.681	South Africa
82	Hassan Allam Holding	Construction	1.667	Egypt
83	AECI	Chemicals	1.645	South Africa
84	Arab Contractors	Construction	1.619	Egypt
85	Egyptair Airlines	Airline	1.602	Egypt
86	Société Ivoirienne de Raffinage	Oil and gas	1.586	Ivory Coast
87	Pioneer Foods	Agroindustry	1.584	South Africa
88	Mr Price Group	Retail	1.558	South Africa
89	Kansanshi Mining	Mining	1.539	Zambia
90	Distell Group Limited	Agroindustry	1.526	South Africa
91	Gold Fields Ghana	Mining	1.517	Ghana
92	Cevital	Agroindustry	1.508	Algeria
93	Airtel Nigeria	Telecommunications	1.503	Nigeria
94	Ghabbour Auto	Automotive	1.479	Egypt
95	Kap Industrial Holding	Holding	1.473	South Africa
96	Blue Label Telecoms	Telecommunications	1.442	South Africa
97	Kibali Gold Mine	Mining	1.440	DR Congo
98	Aveng	Conglomerate	1.425	South Africa
99	Murray and Roberts Holdings	Construction	1.422	South Africa
100	Rustenburg	Mining	1.240	South Africa

== See also ==
- List of companies by revenue
- List of largest manufacturing companies by revenue
- List of largest employers
- List of companies by profit and loss
- List of public corporations by market capitalization
- Fortune Global 500
- Economy of Africa
