= MiWay Insurance =

South African insurance company

- Company type: Privately owned
- Industry: Financial services
- Founded: 2008
- Founder: René Otto
- Headquarters: Johannesburg, South Africa
- Key people: Burton Naicker, CEO
- Website: www.miway.co.za

MiWay Insurance is the first South African-based direct insurance company to offer the purchase and administration of short-term insurance policies online. MiWay was launched in 2008 as an initiative between Santam, Sanlam and PSG.

== History ==
Launched in February 2008 as a joint venture between Sanlam, Santam and PSG, MiWay was acquired by Santam in 2010 and became a wholly owned subsidiary of Santam.

== Awards ==
In 2014, MiWay received the Mail & Guardian "Top Companies Reputation Index" Award. MiWay was the youngest company to win the Ask Afrika Orange Index Service awards in 2011. In 2019, MiWay Insurance was voted South Africa's Best Provider of Auto/Car Insurance in Ask Afrika's Icon Brands Survey Awards.
