= PSG Financial Services =

South African financial services company

- Trade name: PSG
- Formerly: PSG Konsult
- Type: Public
- Traded as: JSE: KST; NSX: KFS
- ISIN: ZAE000191417
- Industry: Financial services
- Incorporated: 14 July 1993; 33 years ago
- Founded: 1998; 28 years ago
- Founder: Willem Theron
- Headquarters: Tyger Valley, Cape Town, South Africa
- Number of locations: 265 (2026)
- Area served: South Africa; Namibia
- Key people: Lizé Lambrechts (Chairperson); François Gouws (CEO); Mike Smith (CFO)
- Services: Wealth management Asset management Insurance; Financial planning
- Revenue: ▲ R7.03 billion (2026)
- Operating income: ▲ R2.66 billion (2026)
- Net income: ▲ R1.74 billion (2026)
- AUM: ▲ R564.6 billion (2026)
- Total assets: ▲ R158.4 billion (2026)
- Total equity: ▲ R6.41 billion (2026)
- Number of employees: 3,304 (2025)
- Divisions: PSG Wealth; PSG Asset Management; PSG Insure
- Website: psg.co.za

PSG, officially PSG Financial Services is a South African financial services company specializing in asset management, wealth management, and insurance. Founded in 1993 and headquartered in Tyger Valley, in the City of Cape Town, PSG is listed on the JSE and NSX.

== History ==
PSG Financial Services was established in 1998 as PSG Konsult, by chartered accountant and businessman Willem Theron, with backing from Stellenbosch-based investment holding company PSG Group.

The company initially focused on consolidating independent financial advisory practices into a nationwide network, expanding through the recruitment of advisers and acquisitions of existing businesses.

In 2013, PSG Konsult underwent a restructuring that consolidated its operations into three principal divisions – PSG Wealth, PSG Asset Management, and PSG Insure. The restructuring reduced the number of underlying businesses from 17 to 11, and preceded plans for a public listing.

On 18 June 2014, PSG Konsult listed on the Johannesburg Stock Exchange (now JSE), having previously traded its shares over the counter since 2005. The listing was intended to improve share liquidity and provide greater flexibility for future capital raising, rather than raise additional capital immediately. PSG Group retained a controlling shareholding of approximately 63%.

In September 2022, PSG Group distributed its controlling shareholding in PSG Konsult to its shareholders as part of a wider restructuring that resulted in PSG Group's delisting from the JSE. PSG Konsult remained independently listed following the transaction.

On 30 August 2023, the company formally changed its name from PSG Konsult Limited to PSG Financial Services Limited. The change followed shareholder and regulatory approval and reflected the company's diversification of services. Its JSE share code, KST, remained unchanged.

In March 2025, PSG Insure sold the Namibian insurance business of commercial insurance company Western National to Santam Namibia for approximately R51 million. The transaction had received approval from the Namibian Competition Commission in August 2024.

In July 2026, PSG founder Willem Theron retired as chairperson after 28 years with the company. He was succeeded by Lizé Lambrechts, a former chief executive of Santam and Sanlam Personal Finance.

== Operations ==
The company operates through three divisions. PSG Wealth provides financial planning, investment management, stockbroking, retirement planning, and fiduciary services to individuals, families, and businesses. PSG Asset Management manages domestic and international investment funds for retail and institutional investors, while PSG Insure provides personal, commercial, and specialist non-life insurance products through insurance brokers and underwriting operations.

As of February 2026, the group operated 265 adviser offices across South Africa and Namibia and had 976 financial advisers, comprising 641 in PSG Wealth and 335 in PSG Insure.
