= Barloworld =

Barloworld may refer to:

- Barloworld Limited
- Barloworld (cycling team)
