= Sygnia =

South African asset management firm

- Formerly: Sygnia Investment Holdings No. 2 Proprietary Limited
- Type: Public
- Traded as: JSE: SYG; A2X
- ISIN: ZAE000208815
- Industry: Financial services
- Predecessor: African Harvest Group
- Incorporated: September 17, 2007; 19 years ago
- Founded: 2006; 20 years ago
- Founder: Magda Wierzycka
- Headquarters: Cape Town, South Africa
- Area served: South Africa; United Kingdom
- Key people: Magda Wierzycka (CEO); Haroon Bhorat (Chairperson)
- Services: Investment management
- Revenue: ▲ R1.06 billion (2025)
- Operating income: ▲ R490 million (2025)
- Net income: ▲ R383 million (2025)
- AUM: ▲ R461 billion (2025)
- Total assets: ▲ R164 billion (2024)
- Total equity: ▲ R850 million (2024)
- Number of employees: 300+ (2024)
- Website: sygnia.co.za

Sygnia is a South African financial services group headquartered in Cape Town, with offices in Johannesburg, Durban, and London. The company provides asset management, investment administration, and savings products to institutional and retail investors, and is listed on both the JSE and A2X.

As at 31 March 2026, Sygnia had R460.8 billion in assets under management (AUM).The group is the second-largest multi-manager in South Africa and the largest JSE-listed provider of internationally focused exchange-traded funds (ETFs).

== History ==
Sygnia was founded in 2006, when Magda Wierzycka led a management buyout of parts of the South African investment and asset management firm African Harvest Group, following the sale of its active asset management business to local specialist financial services group Cadiz Financial Services.

In 2014, the company established Sygnia Securities to support its index tracking and transition management activities.

On 14 October 2015, Sygnia listed on the Main Board of the JSE Limited, South Africa's largest stock exchange.

In 2016, Sygnia acquired Gallet Employee Benefits, enabling its entry into the umbrella retirement fund market. The acquisition led to the establishment of the Sygnia Umbrella Retirement Fund (SURF), while the company also launched the Sygnia RoboAdvisor, an online financial planning tool.

In 2017, Sygnia acquired the South African DBX exchange traded fund (ETF) business from German financial institution Deutsche Bank for R325 million. The acquisition added five JSE-listed ETFs to Sygnia's portfolio, which had a combined assets under management (AUM) value of R11.3 billion at the time of the transaction. The DBX business was subsequently renamed Sygnia Itrix.

In September 2018, Sygnia obtained a secondary listing on South African stock exchange A2X Markets.

In 2019, Sygnia expanded internationally by opening an office in London, UK.

In March 2021, Wierzycka announced she would step down as chief executive, with deputy CEO David Hufton taking over as sole CEO from June 2021. Wierzycka later returned to the role of chief executive.

In 2023, Sygnia listed its first actively-managed ETF, the Sygnia Itrix FANG.AI Actively Managed ETF, on the JSE. The fund was launched following regulatory changes allowing such funds to list in South Africa.

== Operations ==
Sygnia's services include multi-manager and index-tracking investment products, customised investment design, transition management, stockbroking and investment administration. Assets are administered on the group's proprietary investment administration platform. Investment administration services are also provided to institutional clients in the United Kingdom and United States.

Group subsidiaries include Sygnia Asset Management, Sygnia Life, Sygnia Securities, Sygnia Itrix and Sygnia Asset Management UK.

The Sygnia Umbrella Retirement Fund (SURF) is among the largest commercial umbrella retirement funds in South Africa.

Sygnia's Itrix ETF range had R48.9 billion in assets under management (AUM) in September 2025, making the company the second-largest ETF provider by total AUM in South Africa.

== See also ==
- Banking in South Africa
