= Logicalis =

British ICT company

Logicalis Group
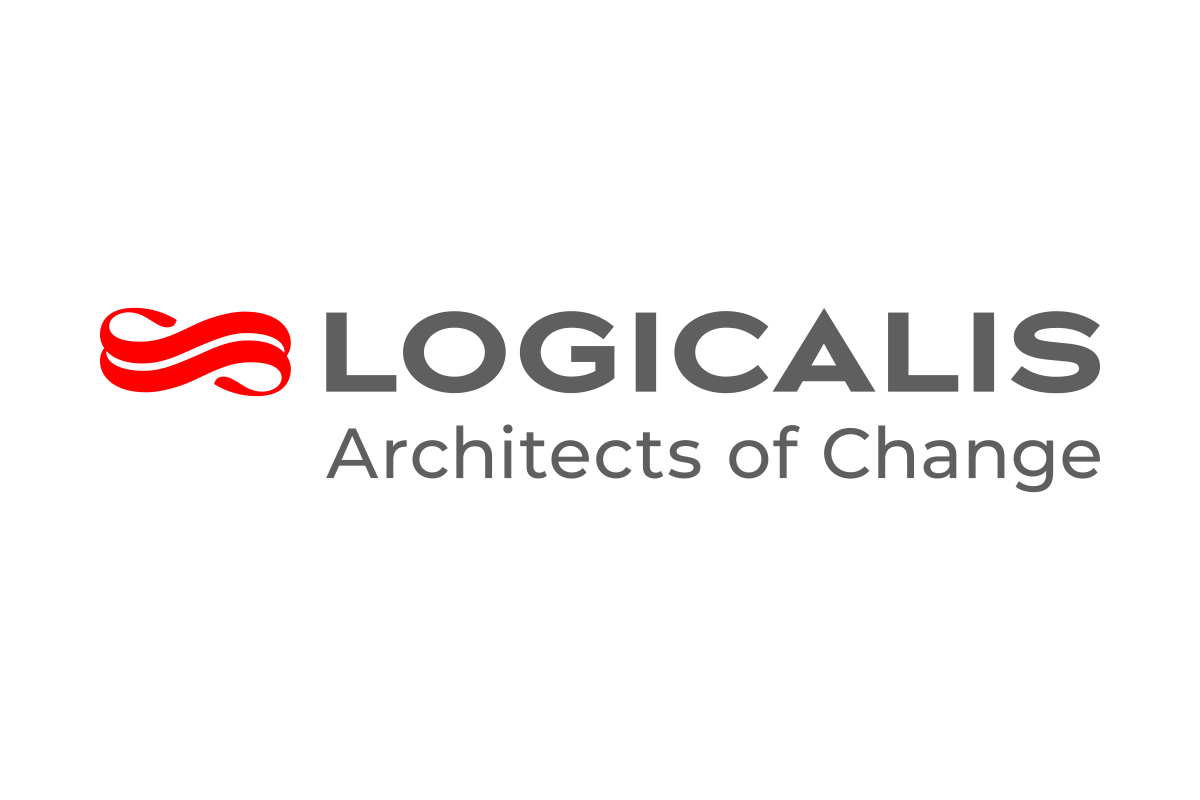
- Type: Private
- Industry: Information Technology
- Founded: London, UK 1997
- Headquarters: Maidenhead, Berkshire, UK
- Key people: Jens Montanana(Chairman); Robert Bailkoski (CEO)
- Revenue: ▲£1.63 billion (2024)
- Number of employees: +7000
- Parent: Datatec
- Website: logicalis.com

Logicalis is a global digital transformation and managed services provider (MSP), headquartered in the United Kingdom. The company is owned by Datatec, a Johannesburg, South Africa-based multinational ICT solutions and services group.

== History ==
In 2001, Logicalis Group, which is 100% owned by Datatec, became the formal statutory holding company of the Logicalis operating companies.

In 2003, Logicalis received an unsolicited offer from IBM for the Group's Australian and New Zealand businesses. The disposal was concluded in March 2004. Since then, Logicalis has continued to acquire companies throughout Europe, North and South America, and Asia Pacific, focusing on IT integration solutions and network and enterprise systems.

In 2022, parent company Datatec, split Logicalis into two separate businesses: Logicalis International and Logicalis Latin America.

Logicalis was named Global Sustainability Partner of the Year at Cisco's Partner Summit 2024, and Cisco's Partner Summit 2023.
