= Fairvest =

South African real estate investment company

- Formerly: Arrowhead Properties
- Type: Public
- Traded as: JSE: FTA; JSE: FTB; A2X
- ISIN: ZAE000304788 (FTA); ZAE000304796 (FTB)
- Industry: Real estate investment
- Predecessor: Fairvest Property Holdings
- Incorporated: 13 November 2007; 18 years ago
- Founded: 17 March 1998; 28 years ago
- Headquarters: Cape Town, South Africa
- Number of locations: 130 (2025)
- Area served: South Africa
- Key people: Darren Wilder (CEO); Ndabe Mkhize (Chairperson)
- Revenue: ▲ R2.18 billion (2025)
- Operating income: ▲ R1.16 billion (2025)
- Net income: ▲ R1.47 billion (2025)
- Total assets: ▲ R15.86 billion (2025)
- Total equity: ▲ R11.14 billion (2025)
- Number of employees: 44 (2025)
- Subsidiaries: Indluplace Properties; Onepath Investments
- Website: fairvest.co.za

Fairvest is a South African real estate investment trust (REIT), headquartered in Cape Town. Founded in 1998, the company is listed on both the JSE and A2X.

As of 2025, Fairvest has a portfolio of 130 properties, including retail, commercial, and industrial real estate. Its investment assets span a gross leasable area (GLA) of over 1.05 million m², and are worth a combined R13.4 billion.

== History ==
Fairvest was incorporated on 17 March 1998 as Basfour 429 Pty Limited.

In December 2001, Basfour was converted to a public company and renamed Fairvest Property Holdings. The company developed a strategy focused on retail properties in non-metropolitan areas, particularly convenience, community, and regional shopping centers serving lower-income consumers.

In 2013, Fairvest expanded this strategy through acquisitions including Nyanga Junction in Cape Town and Matsulu Centre in Mpumalanga.

That same year, Fairvest received approval from the JSE to become a real estate investment trust (REIT).

In January 2014, it completed the acquisition of a portfolio of four retail properties from Vukile Property Fund, issuing R235 million of new equity as part of the transaction. Vukile subsequently became a significant shareholder in Fairvest.

In 2019, Fairvest entered into discussions with Safari Investments regarding a potential merger. Safari subsequently became the subject of a competing offer from Community Property Company, and Fairvest's proposed transaction did not proceed.

In 2021, Fairvest and Arrowhead Properties announced plans to merge. The proposed transaction would create a larger JSE-listed REIT with a portfolio spanning retail, office, and industrial properties.

The merger was implemented on in January 2022. Arrowhead was the legal acquiring entity and was subsequently renamed Fairvest Limited, while the former Fairvest Property Holdings business was incorporated into the enlarged group. The combined portfolio was valued at approximately R12.1 billion, and comprised 141 properties across South Africa.

Following the merger, Fairvest began restructuring the enlarged portfolio around a more focused retail strategy. It sought to dispose of non-core office and industrial properties, reduce vacancies, and concentrate investment on convenience-oriented retail properties in underserved communities.

In 2023, Fairvest sold more than R1 billion of non-core assets – principally office properties and smaller retail assets, as part of its transition toward a retail-focused REIT. The proceeds were used in part to reduce debt.

In November 2024, Fairvest increased its shareholding in Dipula Income Fund from 5% to 26.3%. Its direct property portfolio at the end of September comprised 128 retail, office, and industrial properties valued at R12.3 billion.

In 2025, Fairvest accelerated its expansion in commuter-oriented retail. It acquired five retail properties in KwaZulu-Natal and the Western Cape for a combined R477.7 million, including Nquthu, Ulundi, Shoprite Manguzi, and Thembalethu Square.

In October 2025, Fairvest agreed to acquire the Jozini Mall and Tugela Ferry Mall rental enterprises in KwaZulu-Natal for R674 million.

== Operations ==
As of 2026, Fairvest manages an investment portfolio of 130 properties, with a combined value of R13.4 billion. These span the commercial, retail, and industrial real estate sectors. Of these, 53.7% are retail, 25.9% are industrial, and 20.4% are commercial. Fairvest's properties include:

Property	Sector	Location	GLA	Acquisition	Ref
Access Park	Retail	Cape Town, Western Cape	20,347 m²	2014; 12 years ago	
Cleary Park	Retail	Gqeberha, Eastern Cape	36,567 m²	2015; 11 years ago	
Cape Town Westgate Mall	Retail	Cape Town, Western Cape	29,010 m²	2014; 12 years ago	
Bara Precinct	Retail	Johannesburg, Gauteng	23,507 m²	2014; 12 years ago	
Middestad Centre	Retail	Bloemfontein, Free State	18,758 m²	2011; 15 years ago	
Shoprite Empangeni	Retail	Empangeni, KwaZulu-Natal	13,660 m²	2011; 15 years ago	
Cape Town Bellville Tijger Park	Commercial	Cape Town, Western Cape	21,019 m²	2016; 10 years ago	
Rosebank Quarter	Commercial	Johannesburg, Gauteng	18,767 m²	2014; 12 years ago	
Germiston Route 24	Industrial	Germiston, Gauteng	35,016 m²	2016; 10 years ago	
Randburg Trevallyn	Industrial	Johannesburg, Gauteng	31,993 m²	2016; 10 years ago	
