= Nampak =

South African packaging manufacturer

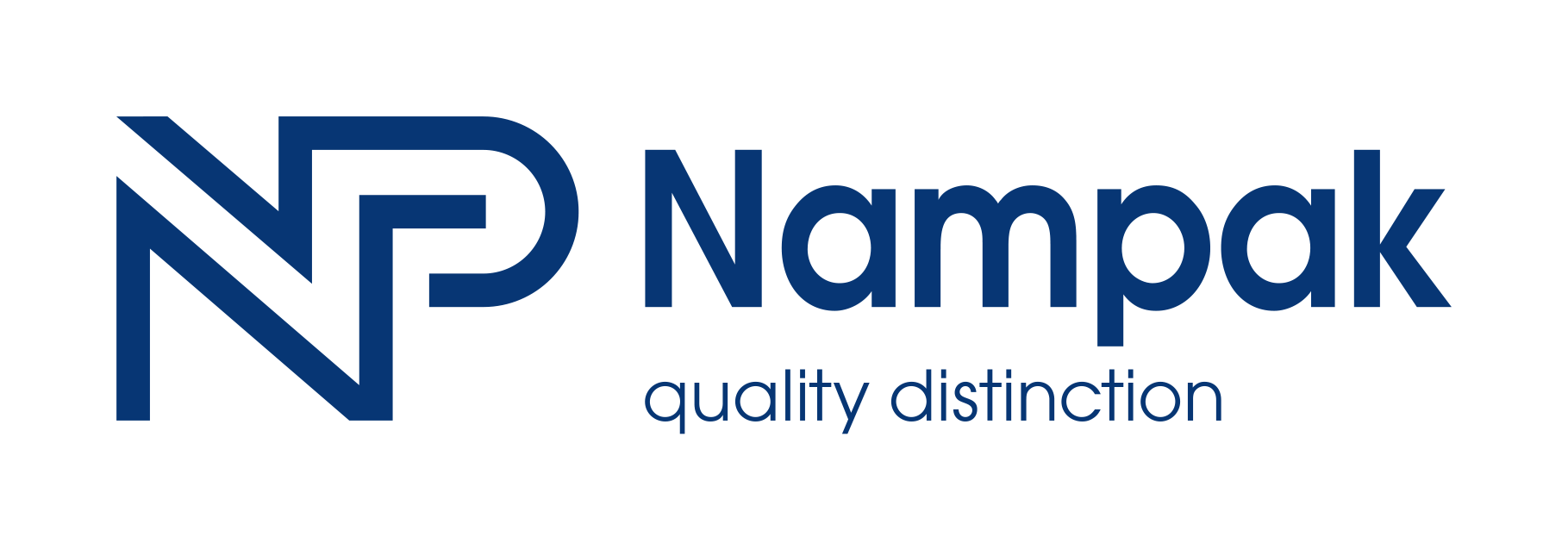
- Type: Public
- Traded as: JSE: NPK
- Industry: Packaging
- Predecessor: National Containers, National Packaging, Amalgamated Packaging Industries, and Metal Box
- Founded: 1968; 58 years ago
- Headquarters: Sandton, City of Johannesburg Metropolitan Municipality, South Africa
- Area served: Africa; Argentina; United Kingdom
- Key people: Peter Surgey (Chairman); Erik Smuts (CEO)
- Revenue: ▲ R 9.96 billion (2024)
- Operating income: ▲ R 1.24 billion (2024)
- Net income: ▲ R −702.1 million (2024)
- Total assets: ▼ R 11.29 billion (2024)
- Total equity: ▼ R 1.42 billion (2024)
- Number of employees: 2,456 (2024)
- Website: www.nampak.com

Nampak (National Amalgamated Packaging) is a South African company, based in Johannesburg, that specializes in the manufacturing and design of packaging.

Nampak is the largest diversified packaging company in Africa. The company produces packaging in glass, paper, metals, and plastic.

The company's subsidiary, BevCan, is one of the largest producers of aluminium cans in Africa. The subsidiary, DivFood, is one of the largest producers of metal cans for canning, aerosols, and metal containers in Africa. Currently, the company is focused on expanding operations into the rest of Africa.

In 2018, the company announced that it was selling its glass packaging division.

== See also ==
- List of companies traded on the JSE
- List of companies of South Africa
- Economy of South Africa
