= Betway =

Online gambling company

- Type: Subsidiary
- Industry: Online gambling
- Founded: 2006
- Headquarters: Gżira, Malta
- Key people: Anthony Werkman (CEO)
- Products: Sports betting, online casino, online poker, online bingo
- Parent: Super Group
- Website: betway.com

Betway is a British gambling company founded in 2006. Its product offering includes sports betting, online casino, online poker, and online bingo. Business operations are led from its headquarters in Malta, alongside satellite offices in London, Guernsey, and Cape Town.

== Overview ==
The Betway brand holds licenses in countries including the UK, Malta, Italy, Denmark, Spain, Belgium, Germany, Sweden, Mexico, South Africa, Portugal, Ireland, Poland, France, Argentina, and the United States. It is a member of the European Sports Security Association, the Independent Betting Adjudication Service, the Remote Gambling Association, and is accredited by international testing agency eCOGRA. Betway has a partnership with the Professional Players Federation, which promotes, protects and develops the collective interests of professional sportspeople in the UK. It is also a supporter of the Responsible Gambling Trust.

Alongside Spin Casino, Betway is a subsidiary of its holding company, Super Group. In January 2022, Super Group listed on the New York Stock Exchange via a SPAC, and now trades as SGHC.

== Sponsorships and partnerships ==
Betway has sponsored many sporting organizations, events, teams and athletes, including Manchester United, National Hockey League, South African Twenty20 Cricket League SA20, and Formula One team Williams Racing.

== World record jackpot ==
In October 2015, Betway paid out €17,879,645 ($20,062,600; £13,209,300) to Jon Heywood (UK) for hitting the jackpot on Microgaming's Mega Moolah slot while playing at Betway. This was verified by Guinness World Records, at the time, as the largest ever jackpot payout in an online slot machine, subsequently surpassed in 2019.

== Regulation and compliance ==
In March 2020, Betway was fined a then record £11.6m for historical failings in customer protection and anti-money laundering checks, allowing one customer to deposit over £8m and lose over £4m in a four-year period.

In the United States, Betway is present in Virginia, Colorado, Indiana, New Jersey, Iowa, Arizona, and Pennsylvania. Users in all states can also play the free Betway Big Pick app to win money without gambling.

== Casino developers ==
Betway Casino offers games provided by developers such as NetEnt and Play'n GO.

== Controversies ==
In 2024, Betway did not pay a price of 1.3 million Euros stating that there was a defect in their site when the client bet was correct.
