= Libstar =

South African food manufacturing company

Libstar Holdings Limited
- Trade name: Libstar
- Formerly: Liberty Star Consumer Holdings
- Type: Public company
- Traded as: JSE: LBR
- ISIN: ZAE000250239
- Industry: manufacturing
- Founded: 2005; 21 years ago
- Founder: Andries van Rensburg; Robin Smith; Metier (private equity firm)
- Headquarters: Cape Town, South Africa
- Area served: 60+ countries globally (2026)
- Key people: JP Landman (Chairperson); Charl de Villiers (CEO)
- Products: Food
- Brands: Lancewood; Cape Herb & Spice; Goldcrest; Sonnendal; Cani
- Revenue: ▲ R12.33 billion (2025)
- Operating income: ▲ R341 million (2025)
- Net income: ▲ −R223,000 (2025)
- Total assets: ▼ R8.82 billion (2025)
- Total equity: ▼ R4.80 billion (2025)
- Number of employees: 6,114 (2025)
- Website: libstar.co.za

Libstar, officially Libstar Holdings, is a South African food manufacturing company founded in 2005. Headquartered in Cape Town, Libstar has been listed on the JSE since 2018.

The company manufactures a range of food products under its own brands, including dairy products, condiments, baked goods, and convenience foods. Libstar also supplies major retailers and food service businesses with products for their own private label brands.

The company primarily operates in South Africa, but also exports products to over 60 countries across the world, as of 2026.

== History ==
Libstar was founded in 2005 by Andries van Rensburg, Robin Smith, and the private equity firm Metier, and was originally called as Liberty Star Consumer Holdings. The company expanded through acquisitions of established food manufacturing businesses, including Montagu Foods, Amaro Foods, Cape Herb & Spice, and Lancewood. This enabled Libstar to develop a diversified portfolio of branded and private label consumer products.

In October 2014, Dubai-based private equity firm Abraaj Group acquired a majority stake in Libstar from shareholders including Metier, Old Mutual Private Equity, Development Partners International, and Lereko. The investment supported the company's continued expansion in South Africa and other African markets.

On 9 May 2018, Libstar listed on the JSE, raising approximately R3 billion through the issuance of new shares and the sale of existing shares. The listing valued the company at approximately R8.5 billion. Its initial public offering attracted criticism from market analysts over its valuation, and the distribution of proceeds to existing shareholders.

In January 2023, Libstar CFO Charl de Villiers succeeded co-founder Andries van Rensburg as the company's CEO, following the latter's retirement. Later that year, Libstar completed a strategic review aimed at simplifying its operations, reducing costs, and improving profitability.

During 2024 and 2025, Libstar implemented a restructuring program that included the disposal of Chet Chemicals, the closure of its Chamonix Spring Water operation, and the sale of its Denny Mushrooms business. The changes followed declining profitability, operational difficulties, and the loss of business from a major food service customer. By January 2026, the company's market capitalization remained substantially below its valuation at the time of its 2018 listing.

== Operations ==
Libstar manufactures, markets, and distributes food products primarily in South Africa. The company also maintains a smaller household and personal care business.

The company produces products including dry and wet condiments, sauces, spices, meal ingredients, spreads, snacks, baked goods, cheese, butter, yoghurt, and convenience meals.

Its brands include Cape Herb & Spice, Cape Foods, Montagu Foods, Cecil Vinegar Works, Rialto, Ambassador Foods, Amaro Foods, Cani, Lancewood, Finlar Fine Foods, and Millennium Foods.

Libstar also produces products under licensed brands, including Denny, Robertson's, Safari, and Jan Braai. In addition, it imports and distributes international food brands such as Tabasco, Häagen-Dazs, Lurpak, Kikkoman, and Bonne Maman.

The company supplies products through retail and wholesale, food service, industrial and contract manufacturing, and export channels. Retail and wholesale accounted for 55.6% of group revenue in 2025, followed by food service at 20.6%, industrial and contract manufacturing at 12.8%, and exports at 11%.

Though its manufacturing activities are in SA, Libstar exports its products to over 60 countries, with major international markets including Namibia, Australia, Botswana, Japan, and the United States.

=== Private label supplier ===
Aside from manufacturing under its own brands, Libstar also supplies products to various major retailers and food service businesses, which are sold via private label brands. As of 2026, these clients include Pick n Pay, Woolworths, SPAR, Shoprite Holdings (including Checkers), Makro, Clicks, McDonald's, KFC, Spur, and Famous Brands.

== Corporate social responsibility ==
Libstar's corporate social investment program focuses on, among other things, education, nutrition, and, skills development. The company reported investing R22.1 million in socioeconomic development programs in 2025.

The company supports food redistribution initiatives through organizations including FoodForward SA and SA Harvest. Its subsidiaries have donated surplus food products, provided meals to disadvantaged communities, and supported educational institutions through financial contributions and teaching resources.

== See also ==
- Manufacturing in South Africa
- Retailing in South Africa
