= Tavaziva Madzinga =

Zimbabwean actuarial scientist and corporate executive

- Born: c. 1978 (age 47–48); Zimbabwe
- Education: University of Cape Town; INSEAD; Harvard Business School
- Occupations: Actuary & Business Executive
- Years active: 2000 – present
- Title: Group Managing Director & Group CEO; Britam Holdings Plc

Tavaziva Madzinga (born c.1978) is a Zimbabwean actuary and corporate executive, who was appointed as the Group Managing Director of Britam Holdings Plc (Britam), a financial services conglomerate headquartered in Nairobi, the Kenyan capital, with subsidiaries in Kenya, Uganda, South Sudan, Rwanda, Tanzania, Malawi and Mozambique. His appointment became effective on 1 February 2021.

In November 2021, the Business Daily Africa newspaper reported that Madzinga would leave Britam in April 2022, to pursue other interests. In December 2021, it was revealed that Madzinga would become an executive director at Santam, a financial services and insurance provider in Eastern and Southern Africa, effective 1 April 2022. On 1 July 2022, he will become the Group chief executive officer at Santam, replacing Lizé Lambrechts, who will leave the group. She will stay on the job, between 1 April 2022 and 30 June 2022, "to ensure a smooth transition". Madzinga will be based in Bellville, City of Cape Town, South Africa.

== Background and education ==
Madzinga was born in Zimbabwe in the 1970s. He studied at the University of Cape Town, graduating with a Bachelor of Business Science in Actuarial Science. He also holds further professional qualifications from INSEAD and Harvard Business School. He is a Fellow of the Institute of Actuaries of the United Kingdom and a Fellow of the Actuarial Society of South Africa.

== Career ==
As of January 2021, his career stretched back in excess of 20 years in the insurance business. He started out at Old Mutual, rising over the years to Regional Chief Executive Officer, for Eastern and Southern Africa. Over the 16 years he spent at Old Mutual, he served for a period of time as CEO of Old Mutual Kenya and as CEO of the Old Mutual subsidiary in Nigeria.

He then transferred to Swiss Reinsurance Company Limited, first as Managing Director, of the Middle East and Africa division and then as Chief Executive Officer of the United Kingdom and Ireland business unit, from January 2019 until January 2021. He spent three years at Swiss Re.

At Britam Holdings, Madzinga replaced Benson Irungu Wairegi, who has served at the regional conglomerate for the previous 40 years. He will be based in Nairobi, Kenya's capital city.

== Other considerations ==
Tavaziva Madzinga served on the board of the Association of British Insurers, in his capacity as the CEO of Swiss Re.

== See also ==
- Equity Group Holdings Limited
- Housing Finance Company of Kenya
