= GetWorth =

South African vehicle sales company

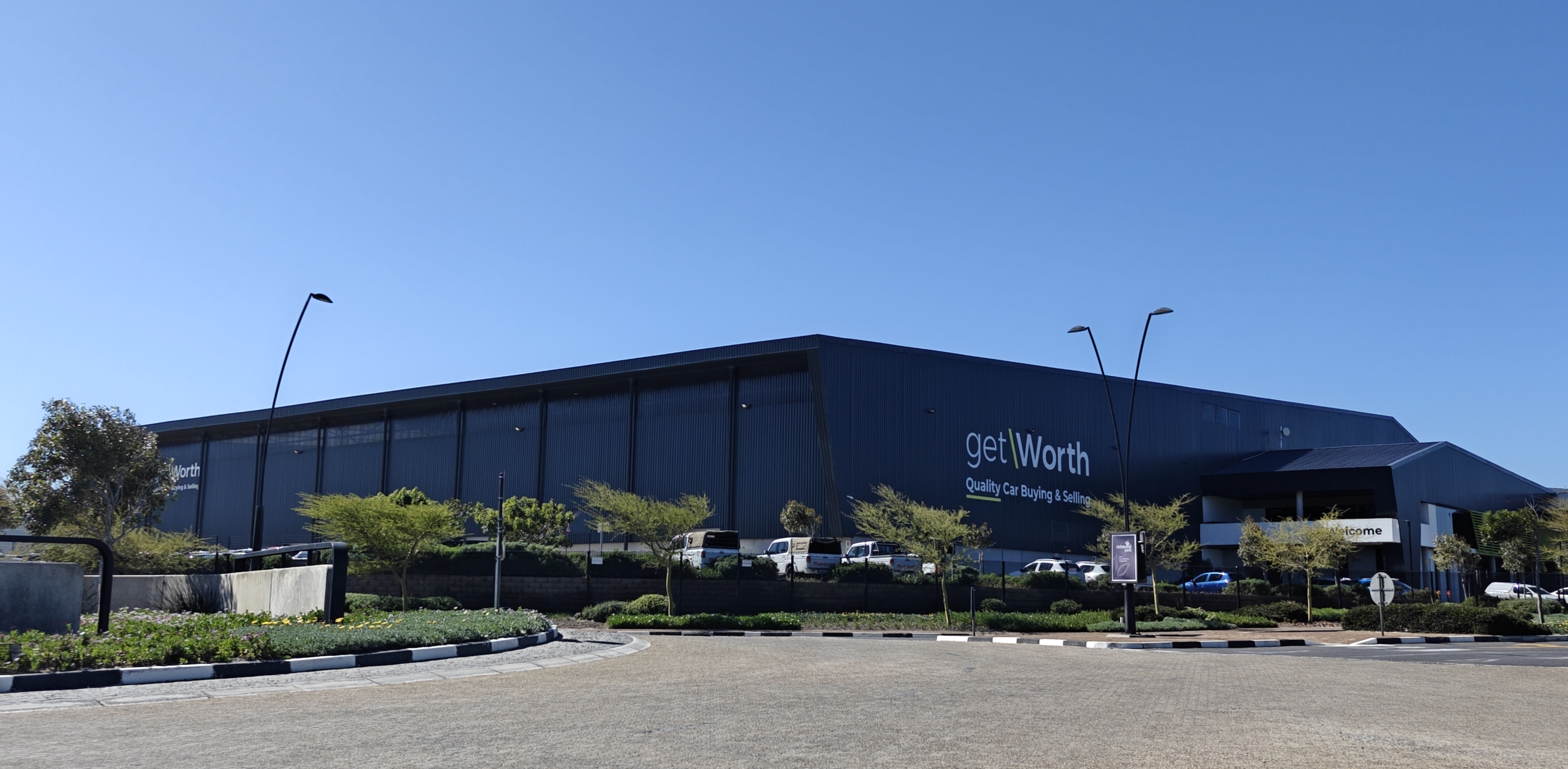
- GetWorth headquarters, including a showroom and warehouse, in Milnerton, Cape Town
- Type: Subsidiary
- Industry: Automotive; Pre-owned vehicles
- Founded: 2017; 9 years ago
- Headquarters: Cape Town, South Africa
- Area served: South Africa
- Key people: Jamie Surkont (Co-Founder & CEO); Mark Ridway (CTO)
- Parent: Motus Holdings
- Website: getworth.co.za

GetWorth (stylized as get\Worth) is a South African non-manufacturing automotive company, headquartered in Cape Town.

GetWorth sells pre-owned vehicles online, and in a warehouse format, across South Africa. Founded in 2017, the company has been a wholly owned subsidiary of major non-manufacturing automotive company Motus Holdings since 2024.

== History ==
GetWorth was founded in 2017, in Cape Town.

In 2021, GetWorth opened its first showroom, located in Montague Gardens, Cape Town.

In March 2022, a 60% shareholding in GetWorth was acquired by South Africa's largest auto retailer, Motus Holdings. At the time, it was reported that there was a shift away from traditional vehicle dealerships and towards individuals selling their own cars. As such, Motus was seeking a way to broaden its vehicle sales formats, and that acquiring shares in GetWorth allowed the former to enhance its vehicle pricing technology.

In the same year, GetWorth reported significant growth, with a 60% year-on-year growth rate for 5 consecutive years, since its foundation.

In September 2024, majority shareholder Motus Holdings acquired the remaining 40% stake in GetWorth, making the latter a wholly owned subsidiary.

== Operations ==
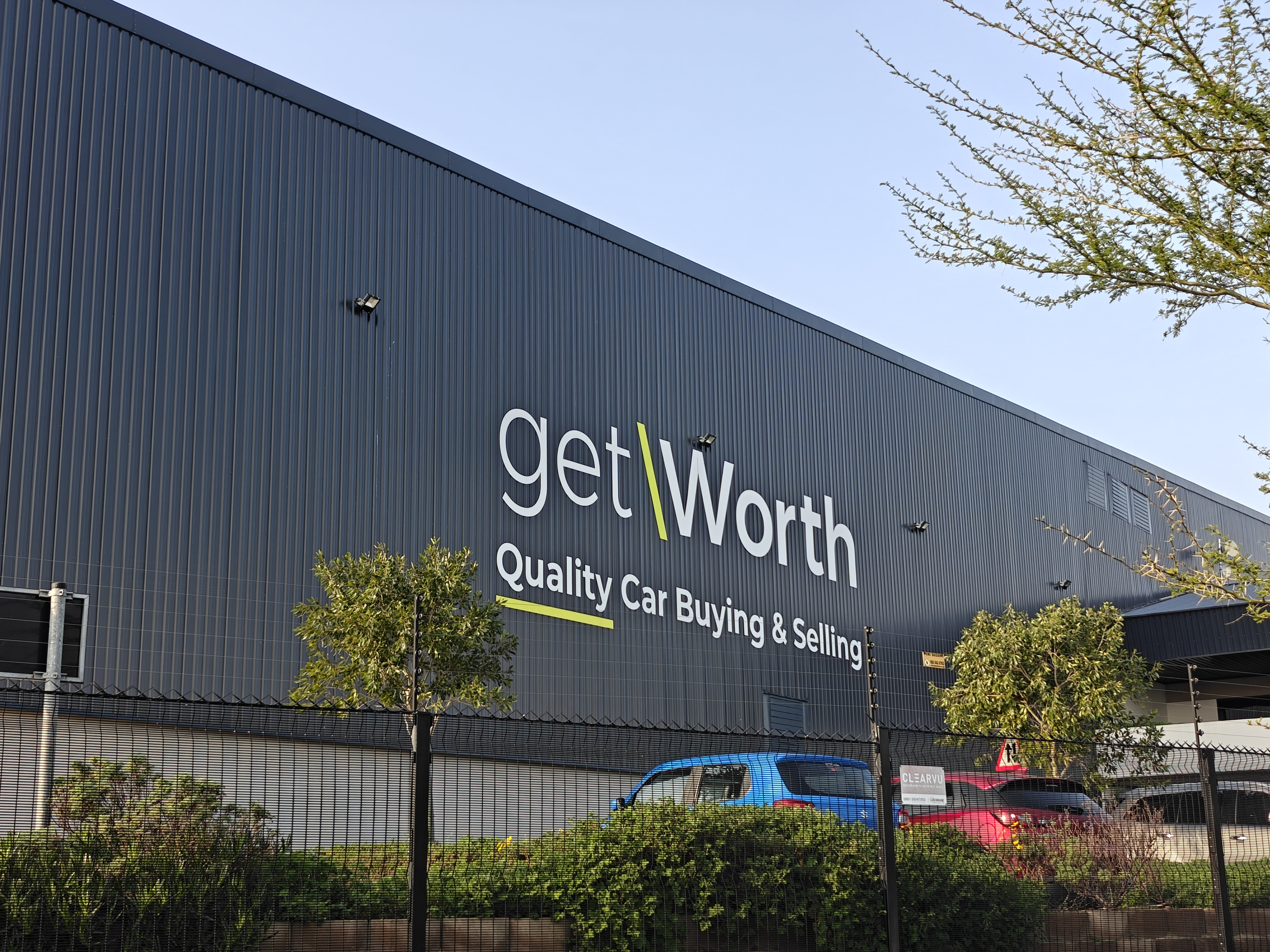
GetWorth signage

GetWorth's primary warehouse and showroom is on the same site as its headquarters, in Montague Gardens, Cape Town. The company also sells vehicles online, and delivers them nationwide. GetWorth also offers extended warranties and service plans.

When consumers submit their cars for valuation, GetWorth provides the option to send information about the vehicle to Motus dealers, who themselves may offer to purchase it.

The company uses pricing algorithms, and sales data collected over the years, to automate its vehicle pricing. It provides pricing information to credit bureau TransUnion, which owns the Mead and Mcgrouther trade and retail values guide.

== See also ==
- Automotive industry in South Africa
