= Magda Wierzycka =

Polish-South African billionaire businesswoman (born 1969)

- Born: Magdalena Franciszka Wierzycka; 1969 (age 56–57); Gliwice, Poland
- Education: University of Cape Town
- Occupations: Entrepreneur; Actuary; Anti-corruption activist
- Employer(s): Sygnia; Coronation Fund Managers; Alexander Forbes Group Holdings
- Spouse: Simon Peile
- Children: 2 sons

Magdalena Franciszka Wierzycka (born 1969 in Gliwice, Poland) is a Polish-South African billionaire businesswoman. She is the co-founder and CEO of Sygnia, a Cape Town-based investment and asset management company.

In 2018, Wierzycka was the richest woman in South Africa. Aside from her business endeavor, she is known for her anti-corruption activism. In 2020, the magazine Forbes listed her among "Africa's 50 Most Powerful Women".

== Early life and education ==
Wierzycka grew up in Jastrzębie-Zdrój, Poland where she shared a 2 bedroom flat with her sister, brother, grandmother and parents who were medical doctors. Wierzycka's Jewish grandmother was a Holocaust survivor. With the gradual economic collapse of Poland due to political sanctions and the subsequent imposition of martial law, Wierzycka moved with her family in 1982 to Austria where they lived for a year in the Polish refugee camp at Traiskirchen. Her parents were forced to dig ditches to earn a living. Her family moved to South Africa in 1983 when she was just thirteen years old, with only US$500 in their bank account. The family settled in Sunnyside, Pretoria, where she attended Pretoria High School for Girls. Wierzycka had to learn English and Afrikaans swiftly because they are the primary media of instruction in South African schools and she spoke neither of the languages. She then attended the University of Cape Town where she graduated with a Bachelor of Business Science and a Postgraduate diploma in actuarial science in 1993 because it was the only degree for which she could receive a bursary.

== Career ==
While in high school Wierzycka worked at a supermarket selling cheese and cold meats. Wierzycka's career in the financial services industry began in 1993 when she became a product development and investment actuary at the Southern Life Association for Mutual Life and Accident Insurance (now part of MMI Holdings Limited). While at Southern Life, she paid back her bursary then spent two years building an asset consulting division as an investment consultant for the retirement fund clients of Alexander Forbes. She joined Coronation Fund Managers, a third-party fund management company based in Cape Town, in 1997, as a director and Head of Institutional Business. At Coronation, she played a pivotal role in making the company one of the largest asset management firms in South Africa.

After her stint at Coronation, Wierzycka became the CEO of the African Harvest Group in 2003. In 2006, she negotiated the sale of Metallon Corporation's African Harvest Fund Managers, a R18 billion asset management company, to Cadiz Asset Management. She then led the management acquisition of the remainder of the group, which culminated in the establishment of Sygnia, a financial technology company. Wierzycka became the company's CEO in 2006. In a decade, she grew the company's assets from R2 billion to R162 billion which resulted in Sygnia becoming the second largest multi-management company in the country. On 14 October 2015, Sygnia was listed on the Johannesburg Stock Exchange. Wierzycka serves on the Africa Advisory Board of Harvard University’s Center for African Studies.

=== Anti-corruption activism ===
Wierzycka has taken strong positions against various instances of corruption in the public and business sector, notably addressing state capture by the Gupta family and their associates; KPMG; Steinhoff International; and other corruption scandals.

== Personal life ==
Wierzycka lives in Cape Town and is married to Simon Peile, who co-founded Sygnia with her. They have two sons.
