= Stor-Age Property REIT =

South African real estate investment trust

- Type: Public
- Traded as: JSE: SSS
- ISIN: ZAE000208963
- Industry: Real estate
- Incorporated: 2015; 11 years ago
- Founded: 2005; 21 years ago
- Headquarters: Cape Town, South Africa
- Number of locations: 110 (2026)
- Area served: South Africa; United Kingdom
- Key people: Gavin Lucas (CEO)
- Brands: Stor-Age; Storage King
- Services: Self storage property investment and development
- Revenue: ▲ R1.39 billion (2026)
- Operating income: ▲ R866 million (2026)
- Net income: ▼ R1.12 billion (2026)
- Total assets: ▲ R14.32 billion (2026)
- Total equity: ▲ R9.4 billion (2026)
- Number of employees: 500+ (2026)
- Website: investor-relations.stor-age.co.za

Stor-Age, officially Stor-Age Property REIT Limited, is a South African property developer and real estate investment trust (REIT), specializing in self storage facilities.

Headquartered in Cape Town, the company was founded in 2005. As of 2026, Stor-Age has 110 properties in its portfolio, worth a combined R19 billion.

== History ==
Stor-Age was founded in 2005, by Gavin Lucas, Stephen Lucas, Les Lucas, and Steven Horton. The company's first self storage facility opened in Cape Town in 2006.

In 2015, Stor-Age incorporated as Stor-Age Property REIT Limited and listed on the JSE Limited, becoming South Africa's first listed specialist self storage property fund.

In November 2017, Stor-Age expanded outside SA by acquiring UK company Storage King.

In 2021, the company entered into a joint venture with major South African commercial bank Nedbank's Corporate and Investment Banking division to develop self storage properties in South Africa. The first were built in Johannesburg.

In January and March 2022, Stor-Age expanded its UK portfolio through the acquisition of McCarthy's Storage World and Storagebase, respectively, as part of its joint venture with Moorfield Group.

In September 2022, the company obtained a secondary listing Sandton-based stock exchange A2X Markets.

In 2024, the Stor-Age entered into a third party management agreement with UK real estate investment firm Hines. That same year, the company expanded its South African portfolio through the acquisition of Extra Attic, located near Cape Town International Airport.

In 2025, Stor-Age opened a self storage facility in London, worth approximately R604 million, through its joint venture with Moorfield.

In December 2025, Stor-Age raised R500 million in equity capital. The following year, the company acquired additional South African self storage assets, including Lock-Up Storage, Execustore, and West Coast Storage.

== Operations ==
As of 2026, Stor-Age does business in South Africa and the UK, and has 110 properties in its global portfolio, worth a combined R19 billion.

=== Property investments ===
In March 2026, the 10 most valuable properties in the Stor-Age portfolio were:

Property	Location	Gross leasable area (GLA)	Value March 2026	Ref.
Gardens	Cape Town, Western Cape	12,453m²	R396 million	
Claremont	Cape Town, Western Cape	9,026m²	R263 million	
Edenvale	Edenvale, Gauteng	8,637m²	R215 million	
Tokai	Cape Town, Western Cape	8,100m²	R205 million	
Centurion	Centurion, Gauteng	20,871m²	R204 million	
Pinehurst	Durbanville, Western Cape	10,464m²	R199 million	
Table View	Cape Town, Western Cape	10,074m²	R187 million	
Sunninghill	Johannesburg, Gauteng	8,531m²	R179 million	
Mount Edgecombe	Durban, KwaZulu-Natal	9,045m²	R175 million	
Craighall	Johannesburg, Gauteng	6,528m²	R168 million	
