= Motus Holdings =

South African automotive group

Motus

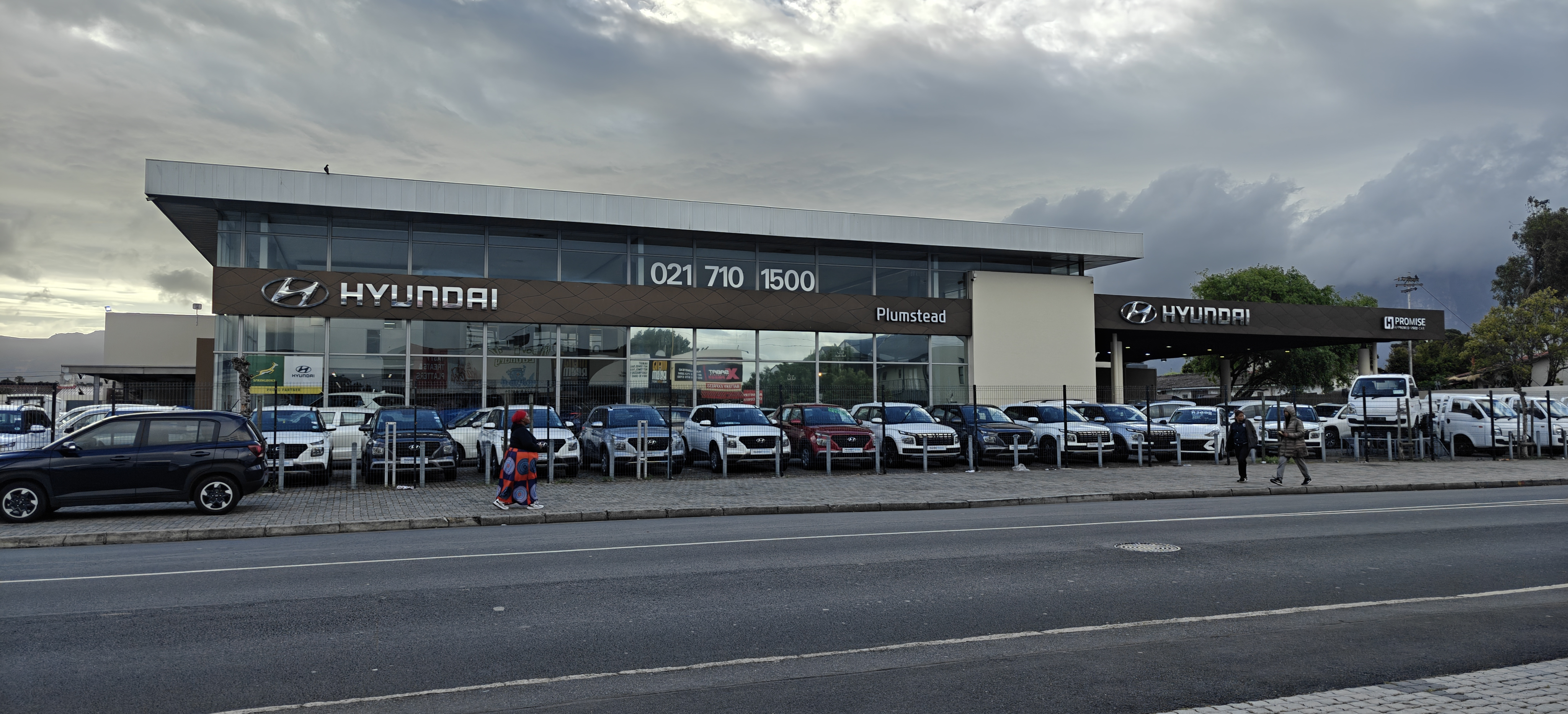
- Motus Hyundai dealership Cape Town
- Type: Public
- Traded as: JSE: MTH
- ISIN: ZAE000261913
- Industry: Automotive; Pre-owned vehicles
- Predecessor: Imperial Holdings
- Founded: 1948; 78 years ago
- Headquarters: Germiston, Gauteng, South Africa
- Number of locations: 1,285 (2025)
- Area served: Africa; Australia; South East Asia; United Kingdom, among others
- Key people: Johnson JJ Njeke (Chairman); Ockert Janse van Rensburg (CEO)
- Revenue: ▲ R113.55 billion (2026)
- Operating income: ▲ R5.71 billion (2026)
- Net income: ▲ R2.98 billion (2026)
- Total assets: ▼ R59.47 billion (2026)
- Total equity: ▲ R20.15 billion (2026)
- Number of employees: 20,000+ (2026)
- Divisions: Motus Select
- Subsidiaries: GetWorth; Midas; Motus Holdings (UK) Limited
- Website: motus.co.za

Motus (officially Motus Holdings Limited) is a South African non-manufacturing automotive group. Founded in 1948, the company is headquartered in Germiston, Gauteng.

Motus is South Africa's largest vehicle dealership group, and one of the country's largest companies by revenue. It is listed on the JSE Limited and A2X, and employs over 20,000 people. As of 2025, Motus operates 1,285 dealerships.

== History ==
Motus was founded originally part of Imperial Holdings, which was founded in South Africa in 1948, with the opening of a car dealership in Johannesburg's CBD.

In January 2018, Motus spun off from Imperial Holdings. Motus was listed on the JSE Limited in November.

In March 2021, Motus acquired a 49% shareholding in second hand vehicle retailer GetWorth. Founded in 2017, GetWorth pays buyers cash for their vehicles, and then sells them in warehouses. The company has a flagship location in Montague Gardens, Cape Town.

Motus' GetWorth shareholding was increased to 60% in May 2022. At the time, GetWorth had plans to build a new outlet, located in Gauteng.

At the end of September 2022, Motus' UK subsidiary, Motus Holdings (UK) Limited, acquired British company, Motor Parts Direct, for R3.62 billion (£182 million).

In September 2024, Motus acquired the remaining 40% shareholding in preowned passenger vehicle company GetWorth.

In November 2024, Motus CEO Osman Arbee retired, after being at the company (and the former Imperial Holdings) for over 20 years. Motus' CFO, Ockert Janse van Rensburg, was appointed as the new CEO.

In February 2025, Motus announced that it had signed a 5-year deal with Indian car manufacturer Tata to distribute its passenger vehicles in South Africa, as well as certain neighboring countries.

In 2025, Motus reported annual South African vehicle sales of 52,548, an 8% increase year-over-year. At the time, the group had 323 dealerships in the country.

== Operations ==
Motus has a presence in numerous markets, including South Africa, other parts of Southern Africa, East Africa, Australia, South East Asia, and the United Kingdom. As at mid-2025, the company ran 1,285 outlets across all its regions of operation.

The company has 4 divisions, listed below, with the percentage of the group's overall revenue each division accounted for in 2024 in brackets next to each one.

- Import and Distribution (15%)
- Retail and Rental (72%)
- Mobility Solutions, including fintech, data, and financial services (2%)
- Aftermarket Parts – distributor, wholesaler, and retailer for out-of-warranty vehicles (11%)

Among the services Motus offers are new vehicle sales, pre-owned vehicle sales (for vehicles up to 6 years of age), parts and related goods sales, vehicle workshops for maintenance, and car rental. Motus operates in both the passenger and commercial vehicle market.

The company has around 80 dealerships as part of its Motus Select Pre-owned vehicle network.

Motus also owns the South African pre-owned vehicle brand Auto Pedigree, which holds around 3,000 cars in stock, with 71 dealerships across the country as at mid-2025.

South Africa is Motus' largest market, where, as at mid-2025, the company operates 933 outlets. Of these, 335 are retail dealerships, including 31 for commercial vehicles, and 205 for passenger vehicles, as well as 63 Auto Pedigree dealerships and 36 Motus Select dealerships.

It also operates 125 car rental branches and kiosks, and 473 aftermarket parts outlets in South Africa (468 of which are franchises and 5 of which are canopy fitment centers).

The Gauteng province has the most Motus outlets, by a significant margin. This is followed by the Western Cape and KwaZulu-Natal, matching South Africa's major population center distribution.

Motus wholly owns South Africa's largest auto parts chain store, Midas.

Aside from its SA operations, Motus also has operations in Southern and East Africa, where the company owns 12 retail dealerships, 15 car rental outlets, and 58 aftermarket parts outlets. Motus also operates 47 passenger vehicle dealerships in Australia, 1 aftermarket parts distribution center in Taiwan, and 1 in China. The group also runs 88 commercial vehicle dealerships, 34 passenger vehicle dealerships, 2 parts DCs, and 178 parts outlets in the United Kingdom, and another parts DC in Europe.

In terms of new vehicle sales, in its mid-2025 annual report, for the preceding fiscal year, Motus recorded around 512,000 sales in South Africa, roughly 2.4 million in the United Kingdom, and around 1.3 million in Australia. Used car sales for the same period totaled approximately 312,000 in South Africa, approximately 7.2 million in the UK, and around 2.1 million in Australia.

The same report showed that the United Kingdom represented Motus' largest market for new energy vehicles, followed by Australia, and then South Africa.

== Brands ==
Motus is the exclusive distributor in South Africa for Mitsubishi, Tata, Renault, Kia, and Hyundai vehicles. The company also has exclusive distribution rights for Nissan in 4 East African countries, and for Haval in 2 East African countries.

Other brands Motus imports for sale in SA include Omoda, Jetour, Jaecoo, MG, and Chery.

In 2025, Motus sold vehicles in South Africa across 29 manufacturers and 39 automotive brands.

In February 2026, Motus expanded to include Honda, Suzuki, and Mahindra vehicles. This was in response to changing market conditions, including an increase in competitiveness of Chinese automotive manufacturers.

== Corporate social responsibility ==
Motus' mid-2025 annual report showed a female representation in the workforce rate of 32%, black representation in South Africa of 79%, and a total spend on Corporate Social Investment (CSI) of R24.7 million. Initiatives focused on improving road safety awareness, literacy, and community healthcare. Motus also reported a total investment to date of R56 million in the South African YES4Youth Program, with 44% of the over 2,000 individuals who have been part of the program having been employed at Motus.

As part of its environmental management approach, the company partners with registered companies for recycling, and sourced around 2,000 kW of renewable energy during its 2023 fiscal year. Motus has also introduced environmental KPIs and incentives for its business segments.
