= Vukile Property Fund =

South African real estate investment trust

Vukile Property Fund Limited
- Trade name: Vukile
- Type: Public
- Traded as: JSE: VKE; NSX:VKN
- ISIN: ZAE000180865
- Industry: Real estate investments Retail
- Incorporated: 2002; 24 years ago
- Founded: 2004; 22 years ago
- Headquarters: Johannesburg, Gauteng, South Africa
- Area served: South Africa, Spain, Portugal, and Italy
- Key people: Nigel Payne (Chairperson); Laurence Rapp (CEO); Laurence Cohen (CFO)
- Services: Retail property development, investment, and leasing
- Revenue: ▲ R5.84 billion (2026)
- Operating income: ▲ R3.58 billion (2026)
- Net income: ▲ R6.11 billion (2026)
- Total assets: ▲ R64.44 billion (2026)
- Total equity: ▲ R35.99 billion (2026)
- Divisions: Southern Africa; Iberia
- Subsidiaries: Castellana Properties; Esperia Properties
- Website: vukile.co.za

Vukile, officially Vukile Property Fund Limited is a South African specialist real estate investment trust (REIT), focused on retail property development, investment, and leasing. Founded in 2004 and based in Johannesburg, Gauteng, the company is listed on the JSE.

As of 2026, Vukile has a portfolio consisting of 56 retail properties across four countries, with a combined value of R63.7 billion.

== History ==
Vukile Property Fund was established in 2004, listing on the Johannesburg Stock Exchange on 24 June that same year. It subsequently listed on the Namibian Stock Exchange on 11 July 2007. The company initially invested in a diversified portfolio of retail, office, and industrial properties across South Africa.

During the 2010s, Vukile increasingly focused on retail properties, disposing of office and industrial assets, while acquiring multiple shopping centers. In 2014, its property portfolio exceeded R10 billion for the first time. The company subsequently consolidated its interests in Synergy Income Fund, further expanding its exposure to retail properties serving lower-income communities.

In 2017, Vukile entered the Spanish property market through its subsidiary Castellana Properties, acquiring a portfolio of retail parks for €193 million. The company subsequently acquired additional shopping centers in Spain and Portugal.

In 2026, Vukile expanded into Italy through the establishment of Esperia Properties, acquiring three shopping centers for approximately €115 million. The company also restructured its Spanish portfolio, selling retail parks valued at approximately €279 million, to concentrate on larger shopping centers.

In November 2026, Vukile announced an agreement to acquire 18 South African shopping centers from financial institution Old Mutual for R16.1 billion. These included Gateway Theatre of Shopping, Cavendish Square, and The Zone at Rosebank. The proposed acquisition represented the largest South African transaction in the company's history, and was intended to significantly expand its domestic retail portfolio.

== Operations ==
As of 2026, Vukile Property Fund operates as a retail-focused real estate investment trust (REIT), investing in and managing commercial properties across South Africa, Spain, Portugal, and Italy. Its principal activities include the acquisition, ownership, leasing, management, and redevelopment of shopping centers and retail parks. The company generates most of its operating revenue from rental income paid by commercial tenants.

In South Africa, Vukile specializes in shopping centers serving urban, rural, and commuter markets. Its portfolio includes regional shopping malls, community shopping centers, and retail parks. Although retail properties account for approximately 98% of its domestic property portfolio by value, the company also holds smaller investments in office, industrial, automotive, and residential properties.

Vukile's European operations are primarily conducted through its subsidiary Castellana Properties, which owns and manages shopping centers in Spain and Portugal. The company also has investments in Italy, through Esperia Properties.

The company's property management activities include negotiating leases, managing tenant relationships and commercial facilities, and maintaining and redeveloping buildings. Vukile undertakes strategic asset management internally, while some day-to-day property management functions in South Africa and Portugal are contracted to external service providers.

=== Portfolio ===
Below are some of Vukile's major property investments, as of November 2026. All properties in the table are shopping centers.

Property	Location	Opened	Acquired	Ownership	GLA (m^{2})	Ref
Islazul Shopping Centre	Madrid, Spain		2026; 0 years ago	100%		
Bonaire Shopping Centre	Aldaia, Valencia, Spain	2000; 26 years ago	2025; 1 year ago	100%	56,943	
El Faro Shopping Centre	Badajoz, Spain	2012; 14 years ago	2018; 8 years ago	100%	59,770	
Bahía Sur Shopping Centre	San Fernando, Cádiz, Spain		2018; 8 years ago	100%	35,418	
Los Arcos Shopping Centre	Seville, Spain	1992; 34 years ago	2018; 8 years ago	Majority interest	33,854	
Pine Crest Shopping Centre	Pinetown, KwaZulu-Natal, South Africa	Late 1980s	2004; 22 years ago	100%	43,635	
East Rand Mall	Boksburg, Gauteng, South Africa	1992; 34 years ago	2013; 13 years ago	50%	34,619	
Phoenix Plaza	Durban, KwaZulu-Natal, South Africa	1993; 33 years ago	2004; 22 years ago	100%	24,363	
Maluti Crescent Shopping Centre	Phuthaditjhaba, Free State, South Africa	2019; 7 years ago (redeveloped)	2015; 11 years ago	100%	35,756	
Mdantsane City Shopping Centre	Mdantsane, Eastern Cape, South Africa	2008; 18 years ago	2019; 7 years ago	100%	36,331	

== See also ==
- Retailing in South Africa
