= Power management system =

On marine vessels the Power Management System PMS is in charge of controlling the electrical system. Its task is to make sure that the electrical system is safe and efficient. If the power consumption is larger than the power production capacity, load shedding is used to avoid blackout. Other features could be to automatic start and stop consumers (e.g., diesel generators) as the load varies.

== A complete switchboard and generator control system ==
The marine Power Management System PMS is a complete switchboard and generator control system to synchronize the auxiliary engines of the ships by implementing automatic load sharing and optimizing the efficiency of the power plant. It handles various configurations of generators driven by diesel engines, steam turbines, and main engines in combination with switchboards of various complexity.

== Power Management System PMS Operation ==
Electrical energy in any combination of the Generators is implemented according to calculations of the electric power tables of each vessel. PMS System decides which Generators combination will be the best according to the Load Consumptions. The capacity of the Generators is such that in the event of any one generating set will be stopped then it will still be possible to supply all services necessary to provide normal operational conditions of propulsion and safety. Furthermore, it will be sufficient to start the largest motor of the ship without causing any other motor to stop or having any adverse effect on other equipment in operation. In general a PMS Power Management System performs the following functions on a Ship:

- Automatic Synchronizing
- Automatic Load Sharing
- Automatic Start/Stop/Stby Generators according to Load Demand
- Large Motors Automatic Blocking
- Load Analysis and Monitoring
- Three (3) Phase Management and Voltage Matching
- Redundant Power Distribution
- Frequency Control
- Blackout Start
- Selection of Generators Priority (first leading main, second and third standby generator in sequence)
- Equal Load Division between generators
- Tripping of non-essential load groups (load shedding in two steps)
- Blocking of heavy consumers
- Operation of second generator in case first generator will be loaded 80% of its capacity
- Operation of standby generator, in case of malfunction in any one of the two generators
- Manual, secured, semi-automatic and automatic mode operation selection of generators
- Control selection for generators in engine control room

== Power Management System PMS Benefits ==
- Diesel generator monitoring and control
- Diesel engine safety and start/stop
- Circuit breaker synchronize & connect
- Bus line voltage and frequency control
- Generator voltage and frequency control
- Generator load in KW and %
- Symmetric or asymmetric load sharing
- Load control with load shedding
- Separation of alarm, control and safety
- Single or multiple switchboard control
- Heavy consumers logic
- Automatic start and connect after blackout
- Automatic line frequency adjustment
- Control of diesel electric propulsion
- "Take me home mode", control of PTI with clutches etc.
- "One touch auto sequence", automatic mode control

== Power Management System PMS Applications on Vessel Types ==
- Tanker (ship)
- Bulk Carrier
- General Cargo Ship
- Container Ship
- LNG carrier / LPG carrier / Gas carrier
- Cruise Ship
- Yachts
