= Spescom Limited =

South African IT company

- Industry: Information technology
- Founded: 1977; 49 years ago
- Founder: Tony Farah
- Headquarters: Johannesburg, South Africa
- Products: Voice and screen recording Contact centre Enterprise Communication Software

Spescom Limited was a South African information and communications technology (ICT) company founded in 1977 by Tony Farah. When it was active, the company was listed on the Johannesburg Stock Exchange under the ticker symbol SPS.

Spescom provided business communications and enterprise technology solutions to clients in sectors including telecommunications, broadcasting, government and corporate enterprises. The company operated through several business units that delivered contact centre systems, telecommunications infrastructure, and media technology solutions.

The group operated in South Africa and other markets in Sub-Saharan Africa, as well as in parts of Europe and the Middle East. Over time, the company restructured its business portfolio, exiting some international and non-core operations, as part of a strategic refocus on communications and enterprise technology services. In 2009, the company's employed around 250 individuals.

== History ==
Spescom Limited was founded in 1977 by Tony Farah. The company initially operated in the field of electronic test and measurement equipment before expanding into communications and energy-related technologies during the 1980s and 1990s.

The company focuses on providing business communications solutions that integrate voice, video, and data technologies. It operates through four main divisions: Spescom DataFusion, Spescom DataVoice, Spescom Telecommunications, and Spescom Media IT. Spescom has offices in Johannesburg, Cape Town, Durban, and London, and employs approximately 258 staff members.

In September 1990, the company developed the Cashpower 2000, a keypad prepayment electricity meter, which was licensed by meter manufacturers internationally. In 1993, Spescom secured an international contract for prepayment meters in Brazil. These meters are now sold in over thirty-five countries worldwide.

On 6 March 1995, the company formed a joint venture with Siemens called Energy Measurements, to develop energy management and revenue collection systems, focusing on prepayment electricity metering. Spescom no longer has an interest in this market space.

In 2007, exited its interest in the enterprise software sector with the sale of its US operation, Enterprise Informatics, to focus on the convergence of voice, video and data communications. In 2008, the company introduced Libra Mobile, a system combining mobile and fixed-line telephony recording.

In 2010, the company established NewTelco South Africa in partnership with NewTelco GmbH. NewTelco SA provide carrier-neutral co-location service provider for local, regional and international carriers in South Africa. In mid-2010, the company opened an office in Kampala, Uganda to support its entry into East Africa. Spescom supplies services to large African communication organisations including Telkom, Neotel and Sentech, as well as financial institutions, public sector clients and contact centres in the region.

In 2012, Spescom was bought by Johannesburg-based IT, communications, and energy company Jasco.
