= Spur Corporation =

Steakhouse franchise restaurant chain based in South Africa

- Trade name: Spur Corporation
- Type: Public (JSE: SUR)
- Industry: Restaurant
- Founded: 24 October 1967; 59 years ago
- Founder: Allen Ambor
- Headquarters: Cape Town, South Africa
- Area served: Worldwide
- Key people: Mike Bosman (Non-Executive Chairman); Val Nichas (CEO); Cristina Teixeira (CFO); Kevin Robertson (COO)
- Products: Restaurant franchises
- Revenue: ▲ R3 045.2 million, up 27.4% (2022: R2 391.1 million) (FY 2023)
- Operating income: ▲ R292.5 million, up 40.0% (2022: R208.9 million) (FY 2023)
- Net income: ▲ R318.4 million, up 51.9% (2022: R209.7 million) (FY 2023)
- Subsidiaries: Spur Steak Ranches; Panarottis; RocoMamas; John Dory's; The Hussar Grill; Casa Bella; Nikos Coalgrill Greek; Doppio Zero; Piza é Vino and Modern Tailors
- Website: https://spurcorporation.com

Spur Corporation Limited is a South African restaurant company. It operates a number of franchise chains, among them Casa Bella, Panarotti's‚ RocoMamas and Spur Steak Ranches.

The company was founded by Allen Ambor in 1967, when he opened the Golden Spur in Newlands, Cape Town. It is listed on the Johannesburg Stock Exchange as SUR.

== Brands ==
The current Spur Steak Ranches logo.

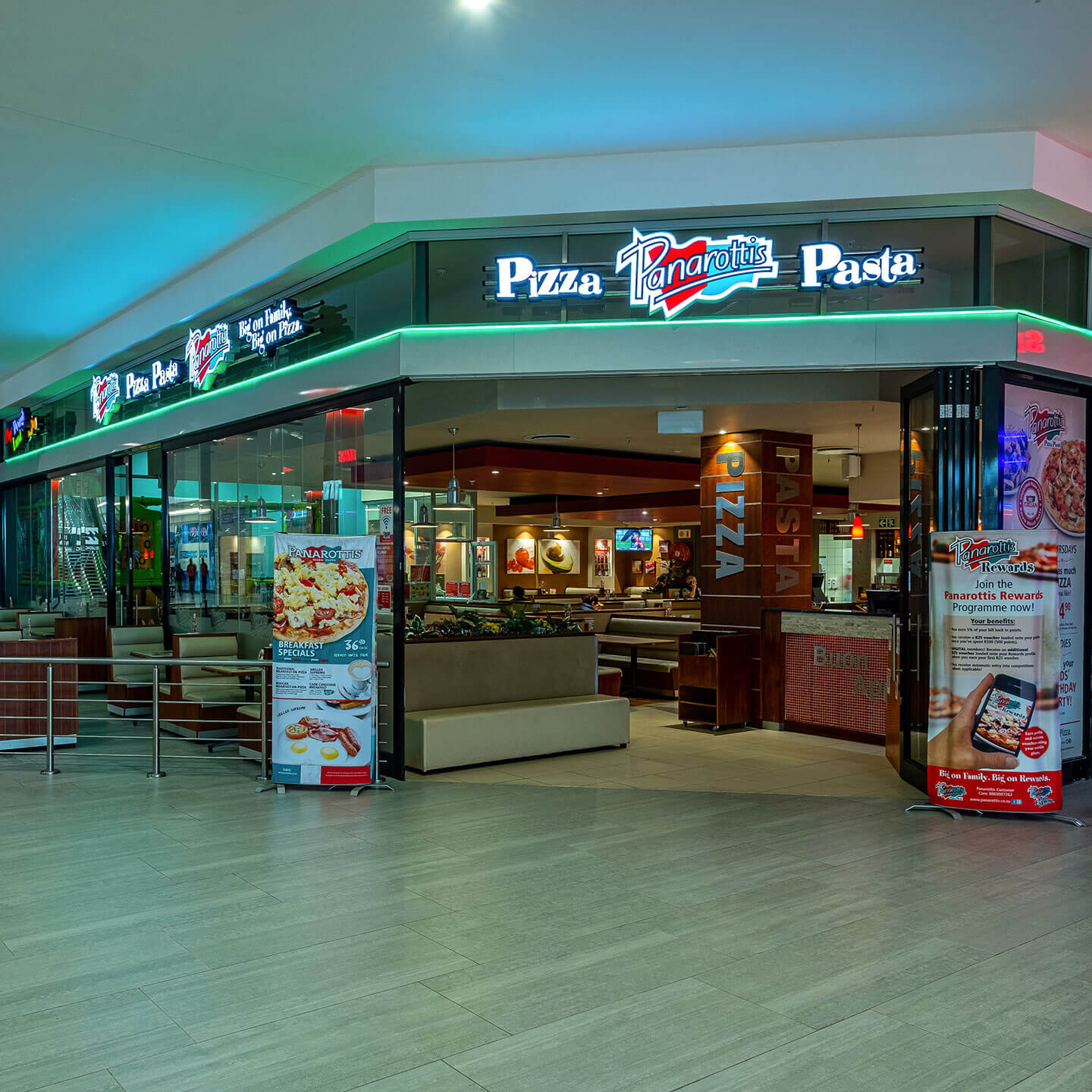
Panarotti's Pizza Pasta in Baywest Mall, Gqeberha, South Africa

Spur Steak Ranches accounts for approximately 50% of the revenue of the company. It sells food to takeaway and delivery services in some locations.

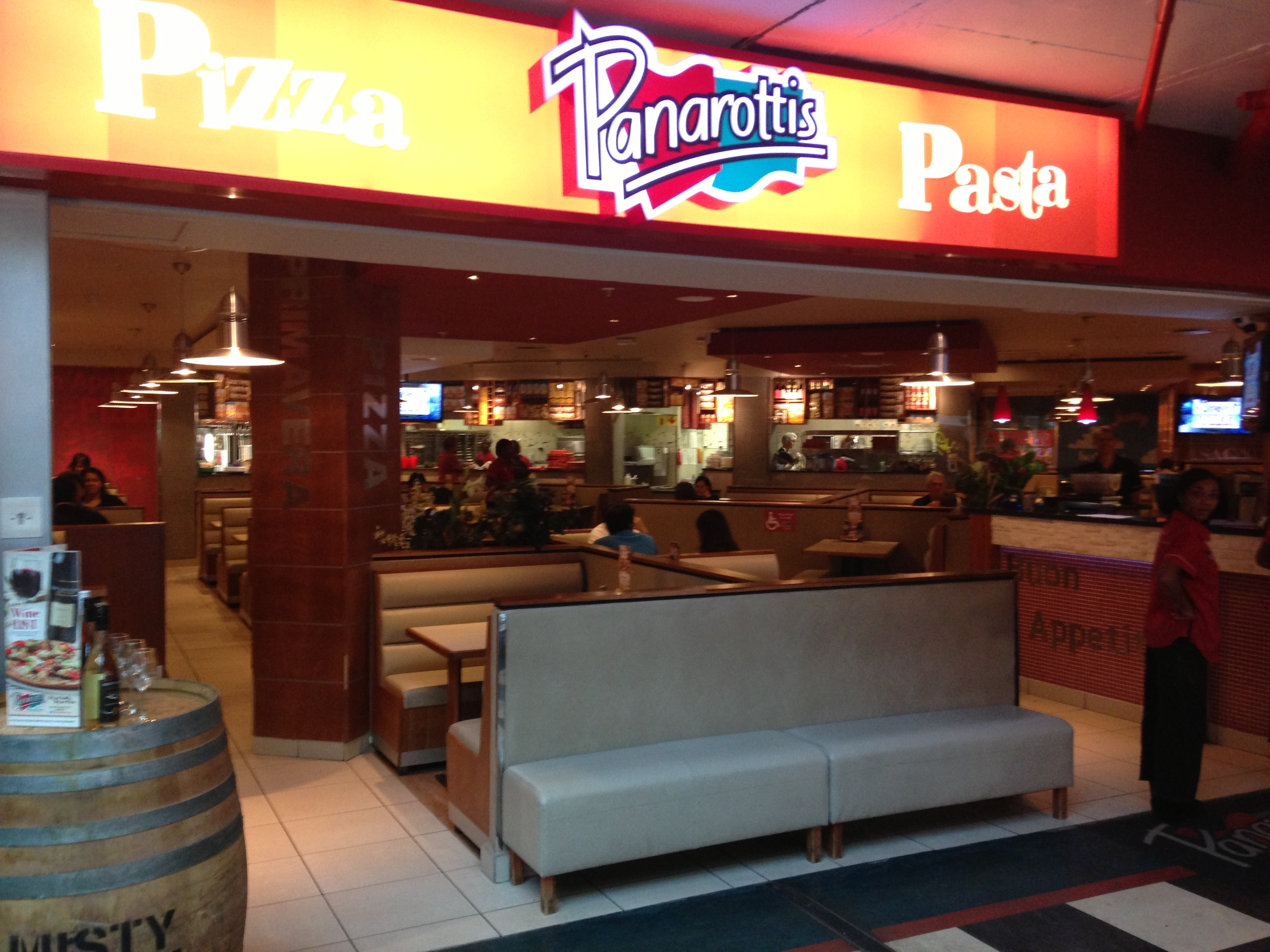
Panarotti’s Pizza Pasta in Century City shopping mall, Cape Town, South Africa.

The Panarotti's pizza and pasta restaurant chain was started in 1989 and had 84 outlets as of 2018.

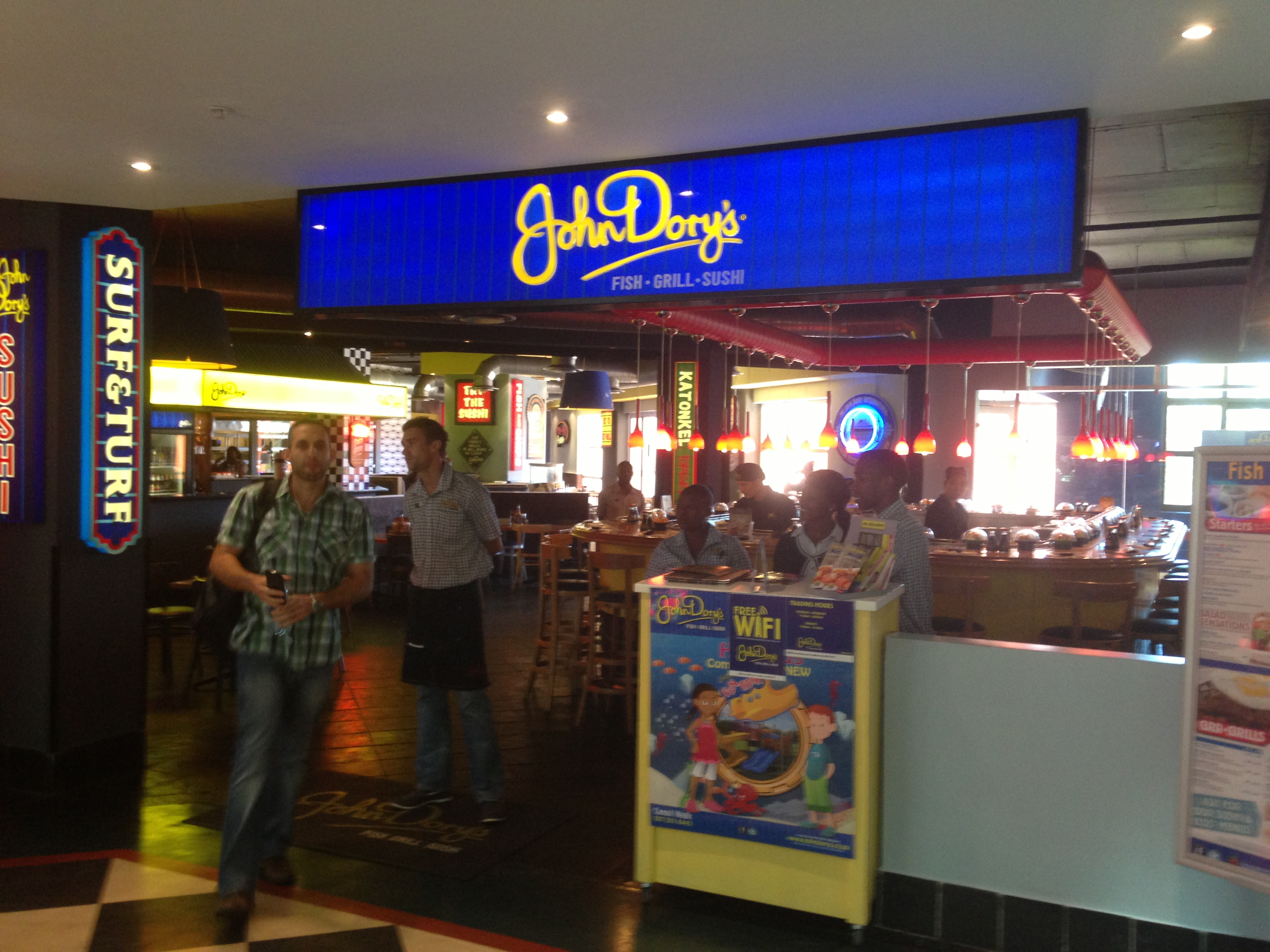
John Dory's Fish & Grill in Century City shopping mall, Cape Town, South Africa.

In 2004 the group bought a 60% shareholding in John Dory’s Fish and Grill, a KwaZulu-Natal-based franchise with 54 outlets.
