= Super Group (company) =

Digital gaming and sports betting company

- Type: Public
- Traded as: NYSE: SGHC
- Industry: Online gambling Sports betting
- Area served: Worldwide
- Key people: Neal Menashe (CEO); Alinda van Wyk (CFO)
- Products: Sports betting Online casino
- Brands: Betway; Spin
- Number of employees: 3,200
- Website: www.sghc.com

Super Group (SGHC) Limited is a global online gambling and sports betting company headquartered in Saint Peter Port, Guernsey. It is the holding company for the online betting brand Betway, and the multi-brand online casino Spin.

== Overview ==
Super Group was founded with a focus on online gaming and sports betting. In January 2022, Super Group listed on the New York Stock Exchange (NYSE) via a special-purpose acquisition company (SPAC) merger, trading under the ticker symbol "SGHC". At listing, the company was valued at approximately $4.75 billion.

On June 27, 2022, the Alcohol and Gaming Commission of Ontario approved Super Group subsidiary Cadtree Ltd to launch four online casino brands in Ontario: Spin Casino, Jackpot City, Royal Vegas, and Ruby Fortune.

In 2024, the company reported revenue of around €1.66 billion, an increase of 18% from the prior year. Adjusted EBITDA also rose significantly, reaching €330.3 million compared to €198.2 million in 2023.

Super Group operates primarily through two main segments: Betway and Spin. Betway is the company's flagship online sports betting brand, which also offers online casino games. It holds licenses in numerous jurisdictions across Europe, the Americas, and Africa, including countries such as the UK, Italy, Spain, South Africa, and several U.S. states. The Spin segment includes a diverse portfolio of online casino brands, such as JackpotCity, Spin Casino, and Royal Vegas.
