= Imperial Logistics =

South African logistics company

- Formerly: Imperial Holdings
- Type: Subsidiary
- Industry: Logistics; Market access
- Founded: 1948; 78 years ago
- Headquarters: Germiston, South Africa
- Number of locations: 26 countries (2025)
- Area served: Africa, Europe, Asia, Middle East
- Key people: Sultan Ahmed Bin Sulayem (Chairman); Mohammed Akoojee (CEO)
- Revenue: ▲ R52.2 billion (2021)
- Operating income: ▲ R2.33 billion (2021)
- Net income: ▲ R1.12 billion (2021)
- Total assets: ▼ R30.32 billion (2021)
- Total equity: ▼ R7.75 billion (2021)
- Number of employees: 25,000+ (2025)
- Parent: DP World
- Website: www.imperiallogistics.com

Imperial Logistics (officially Imperial Logistics Limited, and marketed simply as Imperial) is a South African logistics company, and one of the country's largest companies by annual revenue.

Founded in 1948 and headquartered in Germiston, Gauteng, Imperial operates across the automotive, consumer goods, healthcare, chemicals, and industrial and commodities markets. In 2022, Imperial was acquired by Emirati company DP World.

== History ==
=== Founding ===
Imperial was founded in 1948, as a car dealership in Johannesburg, South Africa.

The company was listed on the JSE Limited in 1987, as Imperial Holdings. Imperial evolved into one of the South Africa's largest diversified multinational groups. Through political, social and economic shifts, it grew into a globally significant importer, distributor, and dealer of vehicles and associated products and services, while expanding into adjacent businesses associated with the transport of goods.

In 2010, Imperial acquired CIC Holdings, a consumer packaged goods distribution business active in the Southern African Development Community (SADC) region, which initiated and accelerated Imperial's expansion into the rest of Africa.

In 2013, the group entered the Nigerian market, by acquiring a 49% stake in warehousing and distribution company, MDS Logistics.

By 2014, as a multinational industrial services and retail group, Imperial Holdings employed more than 52,000 people. The group was generating an annual revenue in excess of R100 billion, across the logistics, automotive, industrial, and financial services sectors. In the same year, Imperial decided to restructure its portfolio, disposing of 55 businesses and 90 properties, and acquiring 17 new assets.

=== Consolidation ===
In July 2016 and January 2017 respectively, the group consolidated its logistics and automotive operating companies and assets within two large, multinational businesses; Imperial Logistics and Motus Holdings. Each company had its own board, chief executive officer and executive committee. The functions of the group head office were systematically devolved, and governance standards and structures were replicated within each company. In July 2017, the group's executive committee disbanded, and authority was transferred to the two new companies' boards. In January 2018, Motus unbundled from Imperial, and listed separately on the JSE Limited, as Motus Holdings.

Imperial increased its shareholding of Nigeria-based MDS Logistics to 57% in 2019. In 2020, Imperial acquired a 49% shareholding in Pharmafrique Proprietary Limited (trading as Kiara Health) - a pharmaceutical manufacturing and healthcare services company, focused on generic and biosimilar medicines. Also in 2020 acquired a 65% stake in Geka Pharma, a distributor of pharmaceutical, medical, surgical, and allied products in Namibia. Furthermore, in 2020, Imperial increased its MDS Logistics shareholding to 65%, acquired a 51% interest in Ghanaian company, Far East Mercantile, and acquired 60% shareholding in Axis Group International, a company focused on sourcing and procurement in Asian markets. In the same year, Imperial entered into a partnership with Turkish freight forwarder, M Ekspres (known as MEX), creating a new multi-modal freight management business, specializing in traffic to, from, and transiting through Turkey.

=== DP World ownership ===
In July 2021, DP World said it would pay up to USD $887 million to acquire all remaining shares in Imperial Logistics. DP World announced on Feb 25, 2022 that the deal had been completed, and the transaction would be implemented on March 14, 2022, with delisting from the main board of the JSE on March 15, 2022.

In March 2022, South Africa's Competition Commission Tribunal approved the acquisition of Imperial by Dubai-based logistics company, DP World. The transaction was found unlikely to significantly prevent or lessen competition in any market in South Africa, and was approved subject to public interest-related conditions. These included the establishment of an employee share ownership program (ESOP), no employees being allowed to be retrenched for a 3-year period following the acquisition, as well as BBBEE-related requirements.

Imperial was sold to DP World for a sum of around R12.7 billion. The company was subsequently delisted from the JSE Limited, after having traded on the exchange for 35 years under the share tag "IPL" and ISIN "ZAE000067211".

== Operations ==
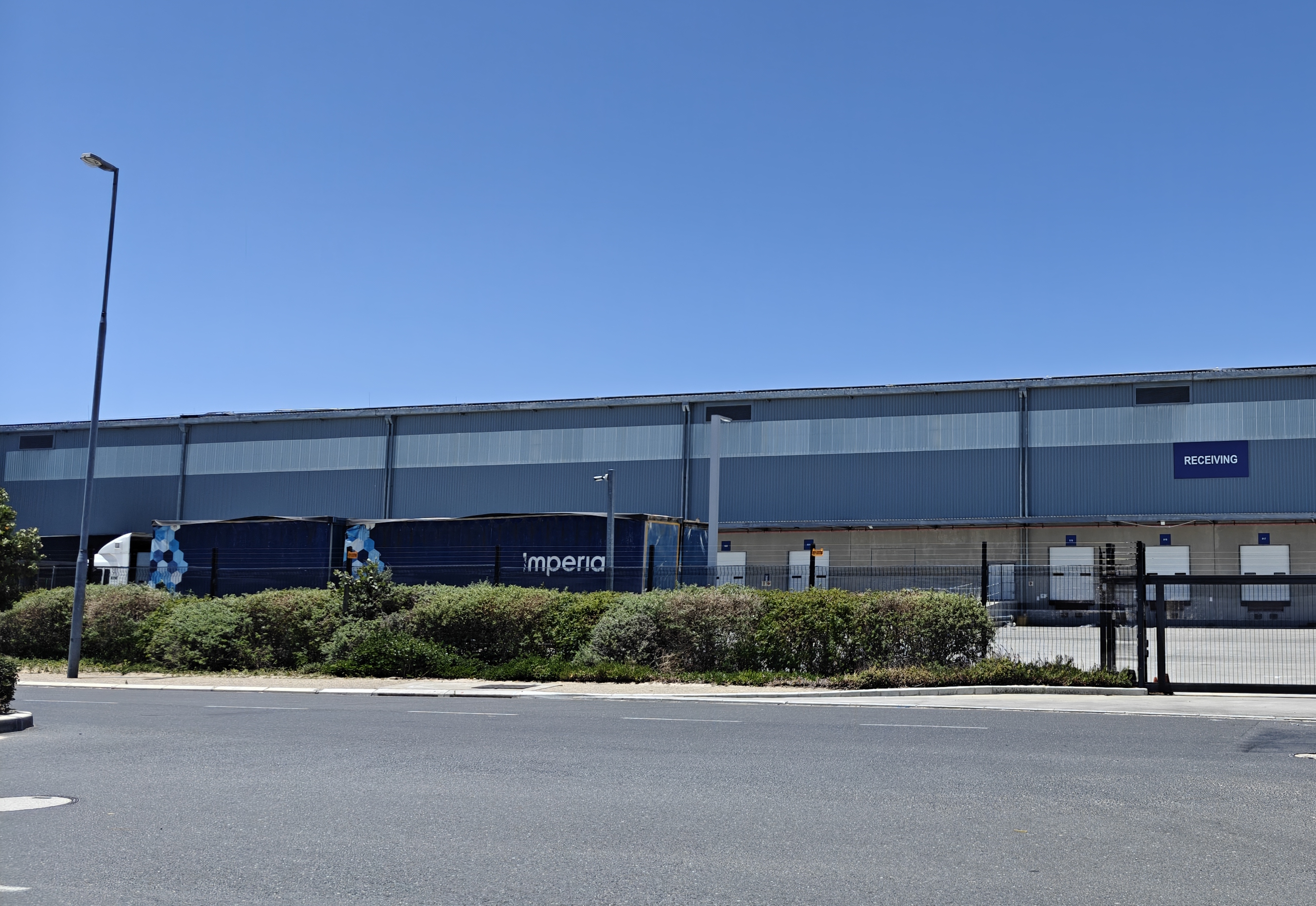
Imperial Logistics trucks in Brackenfell, Western Cape

Imperial has operations across numerous markets, including automotive, consumer goods, chemicals, healthcare, and industrial sectors. The company is focused on African and European market access and logistics solutions. It has operations in 26 countries, across Africa, Europe, Asia, and the Middle East as of 2025.

The company is a member of the Independent Reporting Committee of South Africa (IRC SA).

== Corporate social responsibility ==
Imperial's focus areas for corporate social responsibility include healthcare, education, road safety, sport, and skills development. The company partners with non-profits and governments to support related programs.

Founded in 2010, the Unjani Clinics initiative operates 80 clinics that provide affordable primary healthcare to people living in low-income communities. The program employs over 300 people. In 2020, Unjani celebrated the milestone of 1.5 million patient engagements, and also provided COVID-19 screening for 220,000 people.

The Imperial and Motus Community Trust partnered with the South African Department of Basic Education to provide R5 million each year for 5 years, to establish libraries and resource centers.

Imperial has also partnered with the Caring Women's Forum (CWF) and the United Nations High Commissioner for Refugees (UNHCR) to deliver the Kenyan Refugee Schools Undertaking. Imperial also partners with the SOS Children's Village in Kecskemét, Hungary. The Village provides humanitarian and developmental assistance to socially disadvantaged children in 137 countries, protecting their interests and rights.

Imperial has invested in electric (FCE) fuel cell trucks, fueled by green hydrogen, as part of an initiative to shift towards the use of alternative fuel vehicles and reduce carbon emissions. The company has partnered with South African green hydrogen producer, Sasol, which also has an interest in decarbonizing heavy-duty, long-haul trucking.

== See also ==
- Logistics in South Africa
