= Barloworld Limited =

Industrial brand management company

- Type: Public
- Traded as: JSE: BAW
- ISIN: ZAE000026639
- Industry: Industrial equipment and services Agriculture
- Founded: 1902; 124 years ago
- Founder: Ernest (Billy) Barlow
- Headquarters: Sandton, Gauteng, South Africa
- Key people: Dominic Sewela (CEO); Relebohile Malahleha (CFO); Haytham Zahid (Chairman)
- Revenue: ▼ R41.9 Billion (2024)
- Operating income: ▼ R5.11 billion (2024)
- Net income: ▼ R1.67 billion (2024)
- Total assets: ▼ R41,19 billion (2024)
- Total equity: ▼ R16.67 billion (2024)
- Number of employees: 6,234
- Website: https://www.barloworld.com

Barloworld (officially Barloworld Limited) is a South African holding company, with interests in the fields of industrial equipment, industrial services, and agriculture.

Once a large conglomerate with many unrelated businesses, ranging at various times from mining, information technology, and building materials, to motor vehicles, it has since repositioned itself and unbundled many of its assets. The company used to be the sponsor of the Barloworld cycling team.

== History ==
=== Initial years (1902 to 2016) ===
Barloworld was founded in Durban by Major Ernest (Billy) Barlow in 1902 as Thomas Barlow and Sons, selling wool products, and later engineering equipment. It was expanded by his son Charles Sydney (Punch) Barlow who expanded into the sale and service of Caterpillar products in 1927.

In 1940, after moving its headquarters to Johannesburg, it listed on the JSE. Barlow entered the motor business, and eventually expanded into the manufacture of cement, paint, stainless steel and household appliances, as well as mining, through the acquisition of Rand Mines Limited in 1971, with the new company called Barlow Rand.

Barloworld entered the Russian market in 1998, through its subsidiary Vostochnaya Technica. Barloworld is the official Caterpillar dealer for parts of Russia.

In 2015, the company employed 19,745 around the world.

=== Recent developments (2016 to present) ===
In November 2016, Barloworld and German company BayWa entered into a joint venture (JV) to expand their agriculture and materials handling operations in Southern Africa.

In 2018, Barloworld Equipment had been the official Caterpillar dealer in southern Africa for 90 years. In June 2018, Barloworld sold its Iberian equipment business to Tesa S.p.A. for $180 million. Tongaat Hulett, a South African sugar producer, in February 2020 decided to sell its starch business to Barloworld for $351.10 million including debt.

Barloworld's CEO Dominic Sewela announced that Barloworld would be exiting logistics in June 2020. The company purchased its starch business Ingrain from Tongaat Hulett in 2020, and that year also purchased the Caterpillar dealer Equipment Mongolia. It continued to exit its motor retail business, selling the unit to NMI Durban South Motors.

In 2021, the company announced that it planned to sell its logistics, leasing, and car rental businesses by 2022. In May 2022, Barloworld cancelled significant orders from Russia due to ongoing international sanctions. The company joined the World Coal Association in May 2022. Barloworld Ltd. in August 2022 released a number of bonds that were related to goals related to the number of women in company leadership. In September 2022, Barloworld UK continued to operate the Barloworld UK Pension Scheme. In November 2022, Barloworld was sued over accusations of racism and unlawful termination. In December 2022, Barloworld's car rental unit, Zeda, was listed separately on the JSE with a valuation of $260 million. The unit included the Avis and Budget rental brands. Barloworld said it would continue to focus on renting industrial equipment to mining and consumer-goods companies.

In December 2024, Barloworld announced its intention to sell all of its ordinary shares to a new holding company - Newco - which was to be formed by two existing corporations, namely Entsha Proprietary Limited (a 100% black-owned South African entity) and Gulf Falcon Holding Limited (a wholly owned subsidiary of the Saudi Zahid Group). Entsha would own 51% of Newco, and Gulf would own 49%. As part of the Newco proposal, Barloworld was valued at R23.3 billion. Newco stated that it intended to continue operations under the Barloworld brand.

== Operations ==
Barloworld has two major divisions - Industrial Equipment and Services, and Consumer Industries. The former provides equipment and services for Caterpillar products to industries including mining, construction, energy, and transportation. The latter provides large businesses with ingredients essential to the manufacturing of, among other things, food and beverages, paper, pharmaceuticals, adhesives, and building materials.

The company's Equipment operations are further divided into two segments. Barloworld Equipment Southern Africa operates in 11 African countries, and Barloworld Equipment Eurasia has operations in Mongolia and Russia.

== Litigation ==
=== Barloworld Handling Ltd v. Unilift South Wales Ltd ===
On 24 March 2009, Barloworld Handling Ltd applied under s.69(1) Companies Act 2006 for a change of name for the company called Unilift South Wales Ltd.

Barloworld Handling Ltd argued that since they already acquired a company called Unilift Ltd, Unilift South Wales Ltd should change their name as Unilift Ltd had goodwill and reputation for the marketing, hiring and servicing of fork lift trucks in Swansea and Cardiff.

The problems came from the fact of Unilift South Wales Ltd marketing similar products to those marketed by Unilift Ltd and as evidence of confusion, Unilift Ltd had received invoices intended for Unilift South Wales Ltd.

Barloworld Handling Ltd represented to the Company Names Tribunal that Unilift South Wales Ltd was passing off as Unilift Ltd and so they should be ordered to change their name so that there is nothing even similar to Unilift in their name or trading name.

The litigation was struck out because the Adjudicator found that the respondent had already registered its name on 18 December 2007 and was operating and had not registered a similar name to the applicant's for the purpose of trying to extort money or to prevent them from registering the name themselves. The Tribunal is there to hear complaints that respondents have been opportunistic but they do not decide on claims in the tort of passing off.

== Corporate social responsibility ==
Barloworld operates the Barloworld Empowerment Foundation (BWEF), which is focused on advancing education, entrepreneurship, youth development and social empowerment, and environmental protection and rehabilitation. All of Barloworld's community-focused initiatives are consolidated under the expertise of the BWEF. The company standardizes its goals and values across Barloworld Trust (BWT), the Barloworld Mbewu Social Innovation Programme, and the Barloworld Siyakhula Programme. In 2024, the company invested R5.8 million in socio-economic development programs.

The company operates the Barloworld Equipment Reman Centre (BRC), as part of its salvage modernization project. The BRC is one of 15 certified component repair centers in the global Caterpillar dealership network.

Barloworld has installed roof-mounted solar PV panels at 8 of its sites, in an effort to reduce energy usage and enable more environmentally-sustainable operations. As part of waste reduction, the company has an oil sludge and oil filter recycling initiative. For water reduction, Barloworld uses rainwater harvesting in water-scarce regions, and operates a closed-loop system for its wash bays and water recycling plant.

Through its Young Talent Pipeline, Barloworld provides students with bursaries, and offers traineeships to give recent graduates job experience at the company's headquarters. Its Equipment Eurasia Talent Pipeline runs an apprenticeship program in Mongolia. Through the Education Foundation Trust, Barloworld Equipment Southern Africa funds the education of learners across numerous fields, including engineering, IT, and finance.

== See also ==
- List of companies traded on the JSE
- List of companies of South Africa
- Economy of South Africa
