= Sanlam =

South African financial services group

Sanlam Limited

- Sanlam headquarters
- Type: Public
- Traded as: JSE: SLM
- ISIN: ZAE000070660
- Industry: Insurance; Asset management Financial services
- Founded: 1918; 108 years ago
- Headquarters: Bellville, Western Cape, South Africa
- Area served: Africa; Asia
- Key people: Paul Hanratty (CEO); Abigail Mukhuba (CFO); Temba Mvusi (Chairman)
- Services: Life insurance General insurance Asset management Wealth management Financial planning Healthcare; Credit and structuring
- Revenue: ▲ R244.8 billion (2025)
- Operating income: ▲ R128.3 billion (2025)
- Net income: ▼ R15.9 billion (2025)
- Total assets: ▲ R1.3 trillion (2025)
- Total equity: ▲ R111.5 billion (2025)
- Number of employees: 149,036 (2025)
- Website: sanlam.co.za

Sanlam, officially Sanlam Limited, is a South African financial services group, headquartered in Bellville, in the City of Cape Town. Sanlam is one of the largest insurance companies in Africa. It is listed on the Johannesburg Stock Exchange, the Namibian Stock Exchange and the A2X.

Established in 1918 as a life insurance company, Sanlam Group has developed into a diversified financial services business. Its five business divisions comprise Sanlam Personal Finance, SanlamAllianz, Sanlam Investments, Sanlam Corporate, and major short-term insurance company Santam.

The group's areas of expertise include insurance (life and general), financial planning, retirement annuities, trusts, wills, short-term insurance, asset management, risk management, capital market activities, investment and wealth. Sanlam operates across Africa, as well as in India, Malaysia, the United Kingdom, the United States, Australia, and the Philippines.

Sanlam's 2018 acquisition of SAHAM Finances made it Africa's largest non-banking financial services group.

== History ==
Sanlam logo on the side of its headquarters in Bellville, Western Cape

The Suid-Afrikaanse Nasionale Trust en Assuransie Maatskappy Beperk (South African National Trust and Assurance Company Limited), Santam, was registered on 28 March 1918.

Thereafter, the life assurance department was converted into a separate company, and the Suid-Afrikaanse Nasionale Lewens Assuransie Maatskappy Beperk (South African National Life Assurance Company Limited), Sanlam, was registered on 8 June 1918. Sanlam, the subsidiary, later became the spearhead of the operation, while Santam remained focused on short-term insurance.

In 1998 Sanlam demutualised, listing on the Johannesburg Stock Exchange (JSE) Ltd and the Namibian Stock Exchange. This changed Sanlam from a mutual entity into a public company with a share capital, namely Sanlam Life Insurance Ltd. At the same time a separate company, Sanlam Ltd, was installed as the parent company of the Sanlam group of businesses. The group was also restructured into several independent businesses within a federal business structure.

The group has consistently grown its local as well as an international footprint – it now has a presence in 33 African countries also India, Malaysia, the UK and Ireland, the USA, Australia and the Philippines.

In 2018, Sanlam concluded its $1.1 billion acquisition of SAHAM Finances. Additionally, the group announced details of its R11 billion BEE deal, which will see it increasing its direct black shareholding to 18% and black economic ownership to 35%.

In December 2021, The Sanlam Group entered into discussions with Allianz for the acquisition of the entire group in Africa except South Africa. Discussions are conducted between the group's headquarters in Bellville and Munich.

In February 2023, South African wills and estates administrator Capital Legacy and Sanlam announced that they would joining forces by creating a wills, estates and trusts business together. The transaction, which is subject to regulatory approval, will see Sanlam Life Insurance Limited (Sanlam Life) sell its trust business, Sanlam Trust, to Capital Legacy and Sanlam Life acquiring a 26% interest in the enlarged Capital Legacy Group that includes the Sanlam Trust business following completion of the transaction. The merged entity will be managed by Capital Legacy.

In September 2026, Sanlam announced that it would begin offering banking services in South Africa, in partnership with GoTyme Bank, starting on 1 November that same year. Sanlam said it had received regulatory approval to introduce transactional services to its offerings. The company initially announced plans to enter the banking sector in September 2025. Sanlam will facilitate the marketing and distribution of GoTyme Bank's transactional banking products to Sanlam customers, via the latter's ecosystem. The service will begin using a soft launch, before rolling out nationwide in 2027.

In October 2026, it was announced that Sanlam had made an offer to fully acquire short-term insurance company Santam, in which it already had a majority shareholding. The proposed deal would be subject to regulatory approvals. At the time of the announcement, Santam had a total market capitalization of approximately R43.9 billion, resulting in a transaction value of around R20.7 billion.

== Operations ==
Sanlam Group operates through the following divisions:

- Sanlam Personal Finance
- SanlamAllianz
- Sanlam Investments
- Sanlam Corporate
- Santam (62.7% shareholding as of 2026)

== See also ==
- Banking in South Africa
- Economy of South Africa
