= Santam =

South African financial services company

Santam Limited
- Santam Umbrella Logo

- Santam headquarters in Tyger Valley, in the City of Cape Town
- Type: Public
- Traded as: JSE: SNT
- ISIN: ZAE000093779
- Industry: Financial services
- Founded: 1 May 1918; 108 years ago
- Headquarters: Bellville, Western Cape, South Africa
- Area served: 33 countries
- Key people: Tavaziva Madzinga (CEO); Hennie Nel (CFO); Nombulelo Moholi (Chairman)
- Services: Short-term insurance
- Revenue: ▲ R56.127 billion (2025)
- Operating income: ▲ R5.658 billion (2025)
- Net income: ▲ R4.059 billion (2025)
- Total assets: ▲ R82.392 billion (2025)
- Total equity: ▲ R16.579 billion (2025)
- Owners: Sanlam (62.3%)
- Number of employees: 6,955 (2025)
- Parent: Sanlam (62.7%)
- Website: santam.co.za

Santam is a South African financial services group, focused on short-term insurance. Founded in 1918 and listed on the JSE Limited, Santam is headquartered in Bellville, Western Cape.

The company has operations in 33 countries as of 2026, and is majority owned by local financial services corporation Sanlam. As of 2023, Santam is South Africa's largest short-term insurer.

== History ==
On 1 May 1918, the Suid-Afrikaanse Nasionale Trust en Assuransie Maatskappy / South African National Trust and Assurance Company Limited (Santam) was established. One month later, the South African Life Assurance Company (Sanlam) was established as a full subsidiary of Santam, with the goal of focusing on life insurance while Santam remained focused on short-term insurance.

In October 2026, it was announced that majority shareholder Sanlam had made an offer to fully acquire Santam. The two companies issued a joint statement on the proposed deal, which would be subject to regulatory approvals. At the time of the announcement, Santam had a market capitalization of approximately R43.9 billion, making the transaction value approximately R20.7 billion.
