= Datatec =

ICT solutions and services group

Datatec Limited
- Type: Public Company (JSE)
- ISIN: ZAE000017745
- Industry: Information Technology
- Founded: 1986
- Headquarters: Johannesburg, South Africa
- Key people: Jens Montanana, CEO
- Revenue: ▼US$6.08 billion (2017); ▲US$6.45 billion (2016)
- Number of employees: 8000+
- Website: http://www.datatec.com

Datatec Limited, also known as Datatec Group, is an international ICT solutions and services group operating in more than 50 countries across North America, Latin America, Europe, Africa, the Middle East, and the Asia-Pacific. Through three core divisions, the group offers integration and managed services (Logicalis International and Logicalis Latin America) and technology distribution and financial services (Westcon International).

== History ==
Datatec was founded in 1986 by Jens Montanana, who became the company's first CEO. The company's shares started trading on the Johannesburg Stock Exchange in December 1994, with a share code of DTC.

In 1996, Datatec launched a joint venture with UUNET to form UUNET Africa, an internet service provider. In 1997, the company began its international expansion and acquired UK-based IT firm Logical Networks [3], which later changed its name to Logicalis. In June 1998, Datatec acquired a 92.5% stake in US distributor Westcon for $160 million. The company then consolidated its five-continent distribution business under the Westcon brand. In 1999, Datatec acquired communications consultancy Mason Communications.

In November 2000, the company announced it was selling its stake in UUNET Africa to WorldCom. In 2004, Datatec acquired UK-based telecommunications research and consultancy firm Analysys for £12.8 million. Analysys was merged with Mason Communications, and the new company was renamed Analysys Mason Group (AMG). In October 2006, the company was listed on the Alternative Investment Market (AIM) of the London Stock Exchange. In May 2014, the company spun off Mason Advisory from Analysys Mason to focus on IT, cloud, security, and mobile technology consulting.

In June 2017, Datatec announced it was selling the North and Latin American operations of Westcon-Comstor, along with 10% of the remaining part of Westcon (Westcon International), to Fremont, CA-based IT supply chain services company Synnex, for a reported consideration of up to $830 million. In October 2017, Datatec announced they were planning to delist their secondary listing on the London AIM market on December 8 of that year due to the limited liquidity of the shares on AIM. In May 2018, Logicalis Group, a subsidiary of Datatec, signed an agreement to acquire 100 percent of the issued share capital of Coasin, a Chilean ICT services provider that also operates in Peru.

In August 2020, Datatec announced that its subsidiary Logicalis Latin America had acquired a 30% stake in Brazilian Kumulus. In June 2021, Logicalis Group acquired Siticom, a 5G integrator based in Germany. In July 2022, the business disposed of its management consulting subsidiary, Analysys Mason, for £210m (R4.12bn) to UK fund manager Bridgepoint Development Capital.

== Companies ==
Datatec's companies have three main divisions:

=== IT managed services ===
- Logicalis – an information and communications technology infrastructure and service provider.

=== Financial services ===
- Datatec Financial Services – a financial services provider for customers and suppliers of Logicalis and Westcon-Comstor.
