= A2X Markets =

South African stock exchange

- Type: Stock exchange
- Location: Sandton, Gauteng, South Africa
- Coordinates: 26.11321°S 28.05481°E
- Founded: 2014; 11 years ago
- Key people: Ashley Mendelowitz; Chairman; Kevin Brady; Chief Executive Officer Neal Lawrence; Chief Technology Officer; Otsile Matheba; Chief Financial Officer Gary Clarke; Head of Legal and Regulation
- Currency: Rand
- No. of listings: 176
- Market cap: R 10.9 trillion
- Website: www.a2x.co.za

A2X Markets is a South African stock exchange, founded in 2017. It was launched with the goal of creating competition in the South African marketplace.

== History ==
A2X is an MTF styled stock exchange that was awarded a licence to operate an exchange by the Financial Services Board, now Financial Sector Conduct Authority (FSCA) on 6 April 2017.

On 6 October 2017, A2X debuted with 3 listings African Rainbow Capital, Peregrine Holdings and Coronation Fund Managers and a combined market cap of R14 billion.

== Order and Trade Types Offered ==
A2X offers the following on-book order types:

- Day Orders
- Good Till Date [Within the current day only]
- IOC (Immediate or Cancel)
- FOK (Fill or Kill)
- Iceberg
- Post Only
- Post Only Cancel Replace
- MaC (Market at Close)
- AoD (Auction on Demand)

In addition to the above, A2X also offers the following off-book trade capture reports:

- LIS (Large In Scale)
- NBC (Negotiated Benchmark Cross)
- MP (Matched Principal)

== See also ==
- List of African stock exchanges
