= Mutual Heights =

Building in Cape Town CBD

- Mutual Gebou
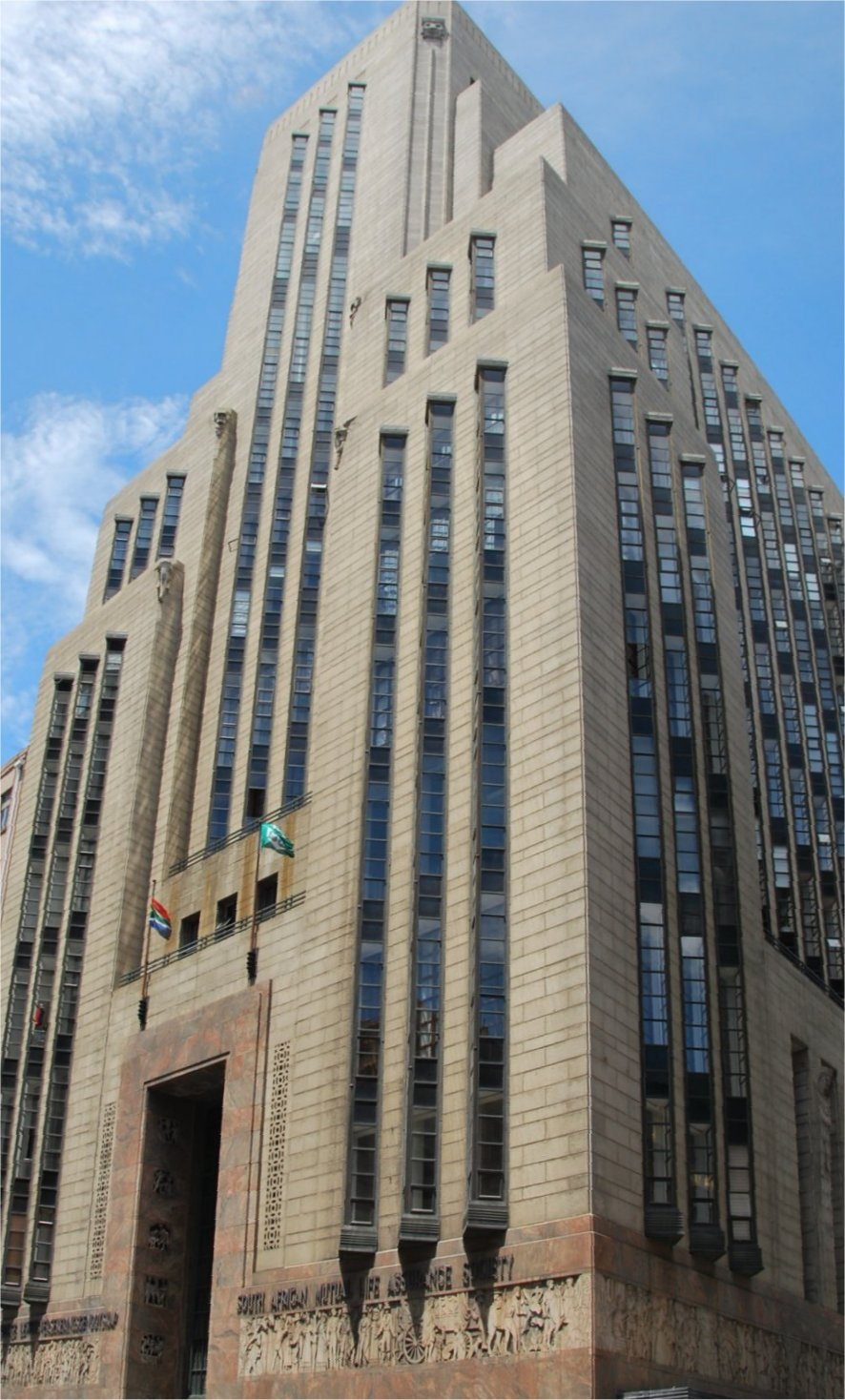
- The front of the building, in Darling Street, Cape Town

- Location within Cape Town
- Former names: The Mutual Building
- Alternative names: The Old Mutual Building

General information
- Type: Commercial converted to residential
- Architectural style: Art Deco
- Location: 14 Darling Street, Cape Town, South Africa
- Coordinates: 33°55′27″S 18°25′20″E
- Completed: 1939
- Inaugurated: 1940
- Renovated: 2005
- Owner: Mutual Heights Body Corporate

Height
- Height: 84 metres (276 ft)

Technical details
- Structural system: Reinforced concrete, granite cladding
- Floor count: 12, plus 3 levels basement parking
- Lifts/elevators: 7

Design and construction
- Architect: Fred Glennie
- Architecture firm: Louw & Louw

Renovating team
- Architect: Robert Silke
- Renovating firm: Louis Karol
- Structural engineer: Murray & Roberts
- Awards: South African Institute of Architects, Presidents Award 2008

Website
- mutualheights.info

Mutual Heights, formerly called the Mutual Building (Afrikaans: Mutual Gebou), is a skyscraper in Cape Town CBD, in the city of Cape Town, South Africa. It was built as the headquarters of the South African Mutual Life Assurance Society (now Old Mutual), and currently serves as a residential tower.

The building opened in 1940, but before the end of the 1950s, Old Mutual's operations were already moving to a new office at Mutual Park in Pinelands.

The building is a fine example of art deco architecture and design, and it has many interesting internal features such as the banking hall, assembly room, directors' board room; external features include a dramatic ziggurat structure, prismoid (triangular) windows, and one of the longest carved stone friezes in the world. It has been said that it provides evidence of the colonial attitudes of the time, and the "ideals of colonial government promulgated by Rhodes in the late nineteenth century".

The Mutual Building is now converted to residential use, although some parts of the building are used commercially. For example, the Banking Hall (which is now an events venue) and the retail shops that operate outside on the ground level.

== History ==
=== The business ===
The Old Mutual business has a long history. In 1845 John Fairbairn (a Scot) founded "The Mutual Life Assurance Society of the Cape of Good Hope" in Cape Town. Over the next 100 years the business was to evolve significantly, changing its name in 1885 to the "South Africa Mutual Life Assurance Society", but becoming familiarly known simply as "The Old Mutual", so as to distinguish it from newer businesses of the same kind.

The company employed women as early as 1901, expanded into Namibia in 1920 and into Zimbabwe (then Rhodesia) in 1927. Old Mutual is now an international business with offices all over the world, and its portfolio of financial services continues to evolve to meet market needs.

It is now some years since the business "de-mutualised" in order to issue shares and fund its operations using conventional investment markets.

=== The "new" (1940) Head Office in Darling Street ===
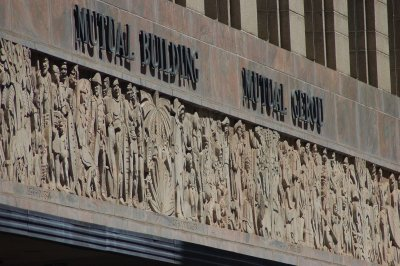
The name of the building in English and in Afrikaans ("Mutual Gebou"): The interesting frieze shown here is described in the text

In the 1930s it became clear that a new headquarters building was needed and very ambitious targets were set for the building: it was to be the tallest building in South Africa (possibly in the whole continent of Africa, with the exception of the pyramids in Egypt), it was to have the fastest lifts, it was to have the largest windows. At the same time it was to epitomise the values of the business: "Strength, Security and Confidence in the Future"; this demanded a combination of traditional and contemporary design.

Although it is clearly identified on the exterior as the "Mutual Building" (or "Mutual Gebou" in Afrikaans) it is often familiarly referred to as "The Old Mutual Building". Here, in the body of this article, it will be referred to as the "Mutual Building", thereby acknowledging the nomenclature on the exterior of the building itself.

=== Search for inspiration ===
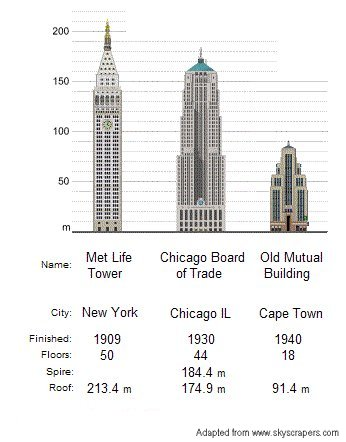
Some comparisons with earlier inspirational buildings

The figure here (adapted from www.skycrapers.com) compares the building with some of the other contemporaneous tall buildings in the world. Those involved in the design of the building travelled widely to study inspirational examples of corporate buildings elsewhere in the world. They learnt about the latest approaches to lighting, ventilation and fire protection in the US, South America, England and Sweden. In the US, the Eastern Columbia Building in Los Angeles is one example of the genre of building design that captured their attention: this building was completed in 1930 and has also since been converted to residential occupation.

The art deco style was chosen. However, the building is embellished with features in other styles (such as neo-classicist in the case of the banking hall) intended to reinforce the long-standing and traditional values of the Old Mutual business.

=== Completion ===
The building was completed in 1939 and opened early in 1940 with a great fanfare. The local paper provided a 16-page supplement, and South African architects and dignitaries enthused about it. In his definitive examination of the design of the building, Federico Freschi summarises the status of the building thus:

"Ultimately, the consensus suggests that the Old Mutual Building is at once a worthy monument to modern design principles and the consolidation of an important corporate and public image."

The building is listed elsewhere as a notable building, and it is regarded as an important example of the social values of the time and of the economic state of the nation, but all as seen from a European or "colonial" perspective, as explained by Freschi.

=== Vacating and conversion ===
Within 20 years (in the late 1950s) the Old Mutual began to vacate the building, moving in stages to new offices at Mutual Park in Pinelands, Cape Town. By the 1990s, only assorted tenants remained, the last of which departed in May 2003.

At this time, conversion to residential occupation began under the direction of Robert Silke at Louis Karol Architects. The name of the building was changed by the developers to Mutual Heights, a decision that did not find favour with all owners and residents involved in the new community. Despite scepticism about the name, it is generally agreed that the conversion was the first in a series of projects that re-invigorated the central business district of Cape Town. The conversion has been the subject of a number of architecture and design awards.

In February 2012, the large "Old Mutual" sign on the east side of the building was removed, leaving little external evidence of the commercial origins of the building; in 2015 Old Mutual Properties finally disposed of the remaining portions of the interior that had not been sold previously, including the banking hall, the directors suite and the fresco room.

== Structure of the building ==
The building is constructed using reinforced concrete, filled in internally with bricks and plaster, and clad on the outside with granite. At first sight, the building is a striking example of the Art Deco style and many of its features epitomize this genre - however, some interior features deviate from true Art Deco and probably reflect the desire of the company to demonstrate solidity and traditional values at the same time as contemporaneous, forward-looking values.

It is 276 feet (84 m) high, as measured from the ground floor to the top of the tower, but the building is often listed as being more than 90 metres high (even as high as 96.8 metres on the Old Mutual web site); this probably takes account of the "spire" at the top.

Having only 10 levels ("storeys") above ground level in the main part of this tall building (excluding the three levels of basement car parking, and the additional levels in the tower), it is evident that the spacing between floors is generous — generally each floor is about 5 metres (16 ft) above (or below) the next. In one of the meeting rooms on the eighth level (the Assembly Hall - see below), the curtains alone are more than six metres long. This generous spacing between floors was intended to achieve the greatest possible overall height for the building without exceeding the city planning limitation of 10 storeys, and it was allowed only in view of the "set back" design of the exterior structure.

== Design elements ==
The original design of the building is attributed to Louw & Louw (Cape Town architects), working with Fred Glennie (best known at the time as a mentor to architectural students) – Mr Glennie is personally credited with most of the detailed work but Ivan Mitford-Barberton was also involved with some internal details as well as with the external granite decorations.

It is pleasing that the principal areas of the building have been so little changed over the years, especially the entrance, the banking hall, the assembly room, the directors' room, the atrium, and the windows. Even the original door handles (including the Old Mutual "logo") and the original banisters (on the staircases) are all still intact, and the atrium is largely unchanged although it is now protected from the weather by a translucent roof.

The original light fittings in the "public" areas are largely still intact, and in most parts of the building there are beautiful block-wood (parquet) floors.

Here is a selection of interior design details that exemplify the quality and attention to detail that was applied to this project by the architects, artists and designers.

Some interior design details

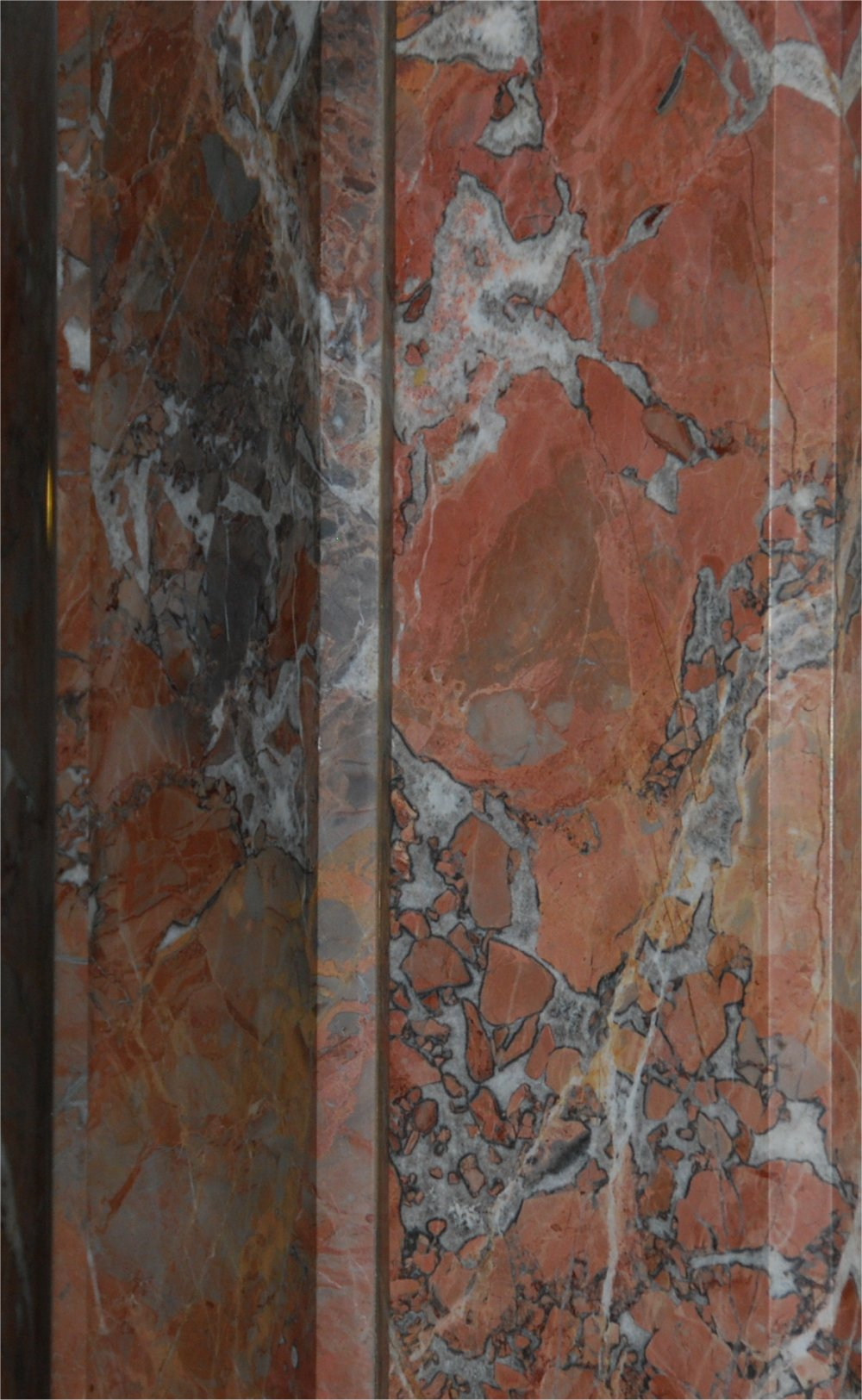
Marble from the columns in the banking hall

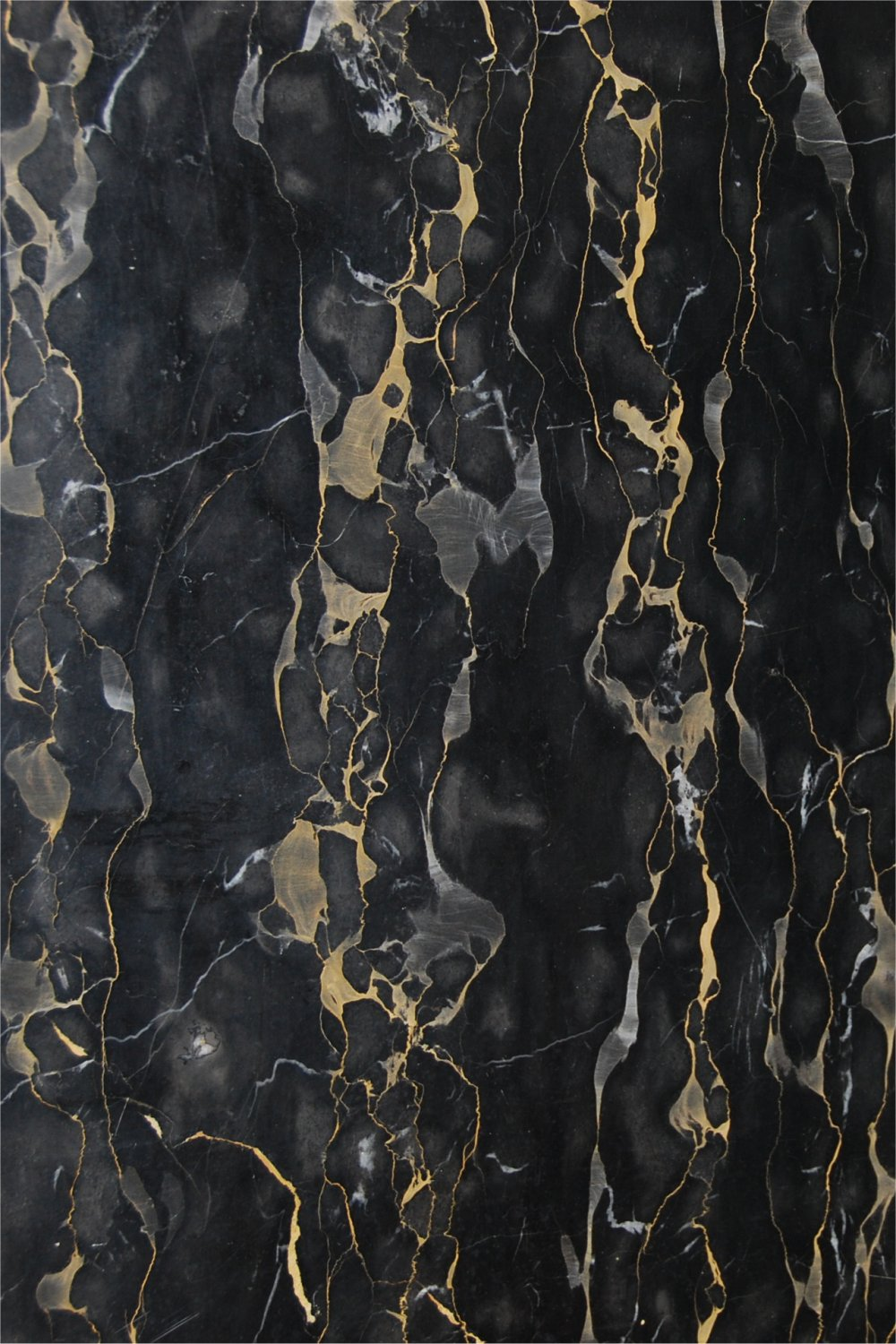
White-veined Onyx from the entrance hall

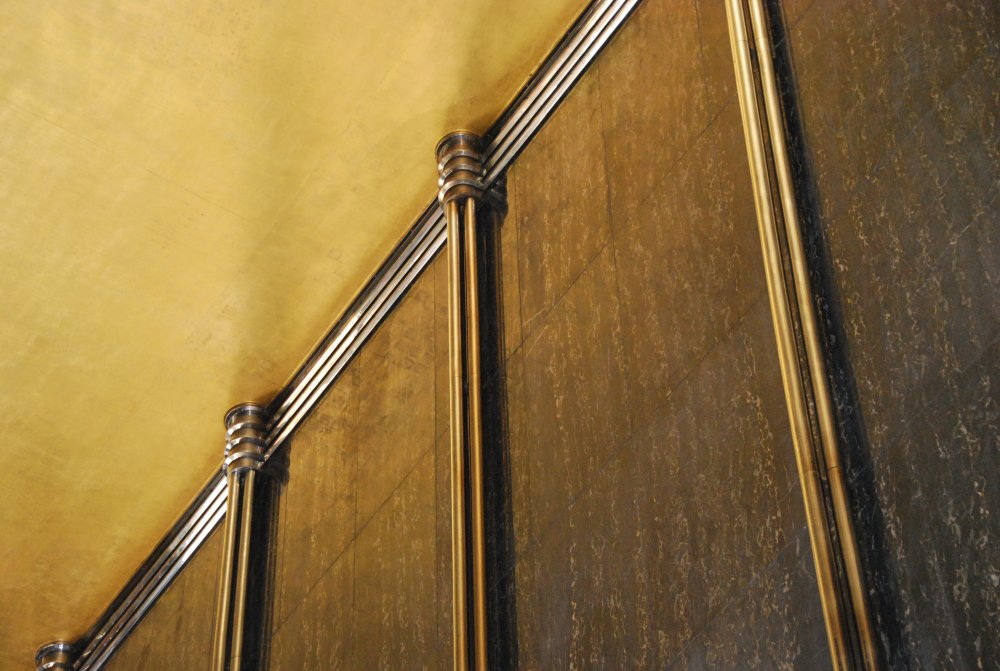
The entrance hall has a gold leaf ceiling

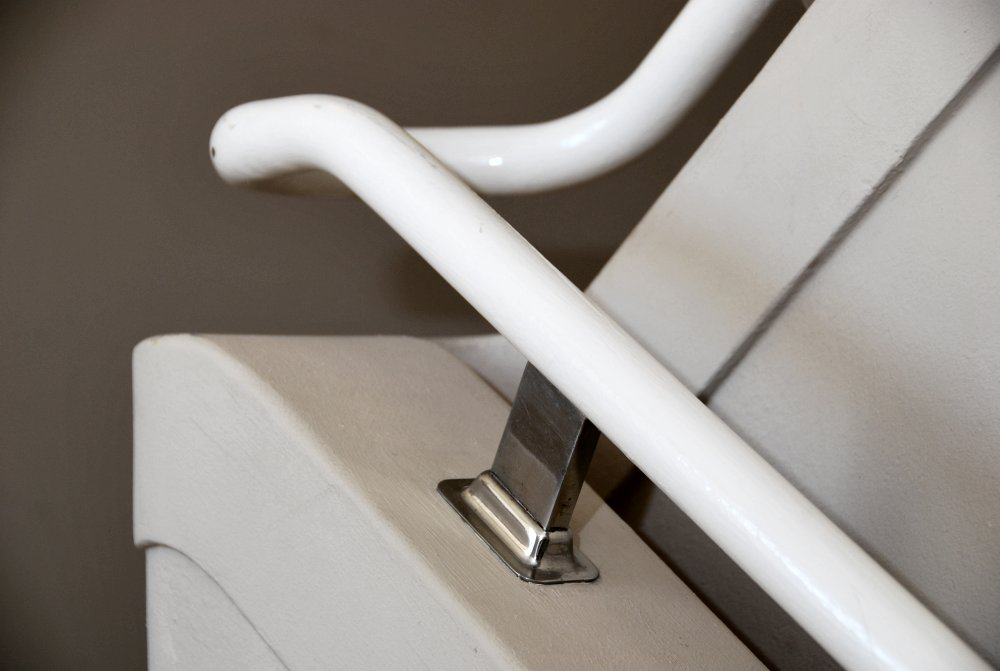
Detail of a banister on one of the stairs

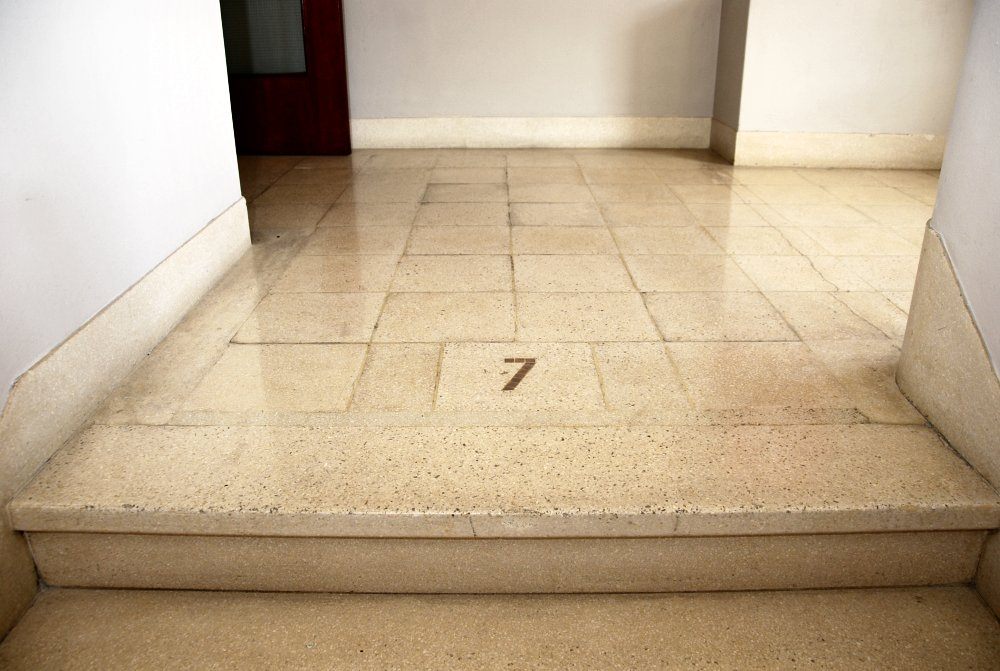
As you use the stairs, you are reminded which storey you are on

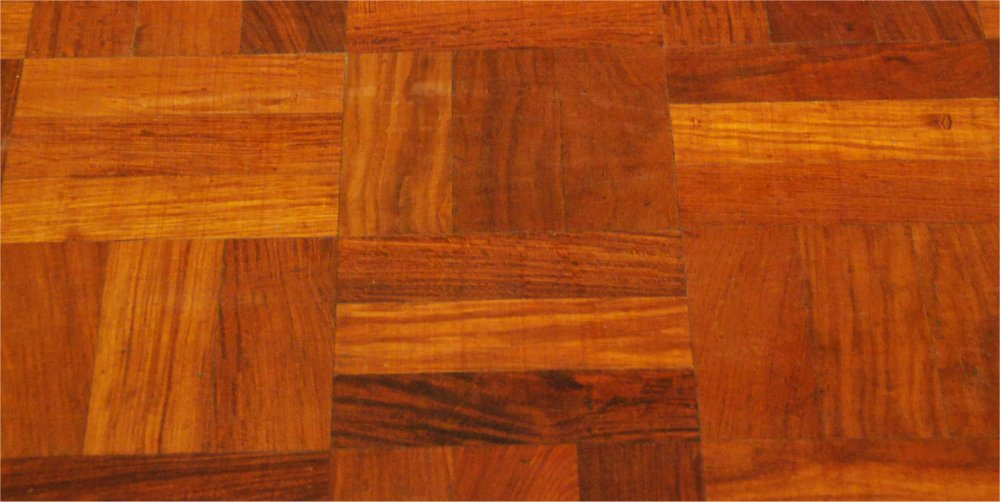
Hardwood block floors are still in place in many parts of the building

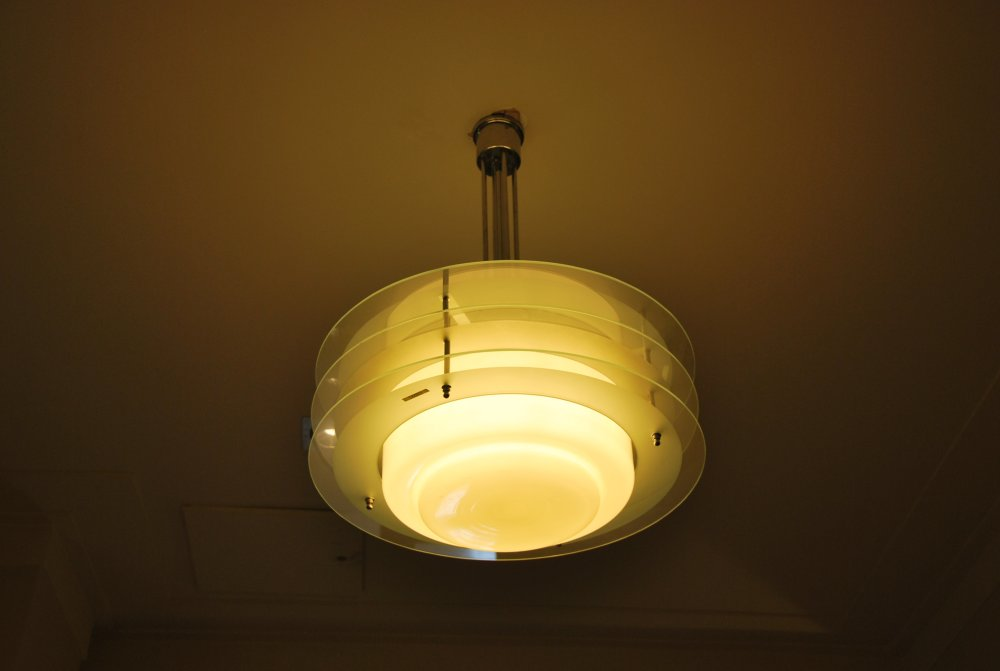
An original light fitting

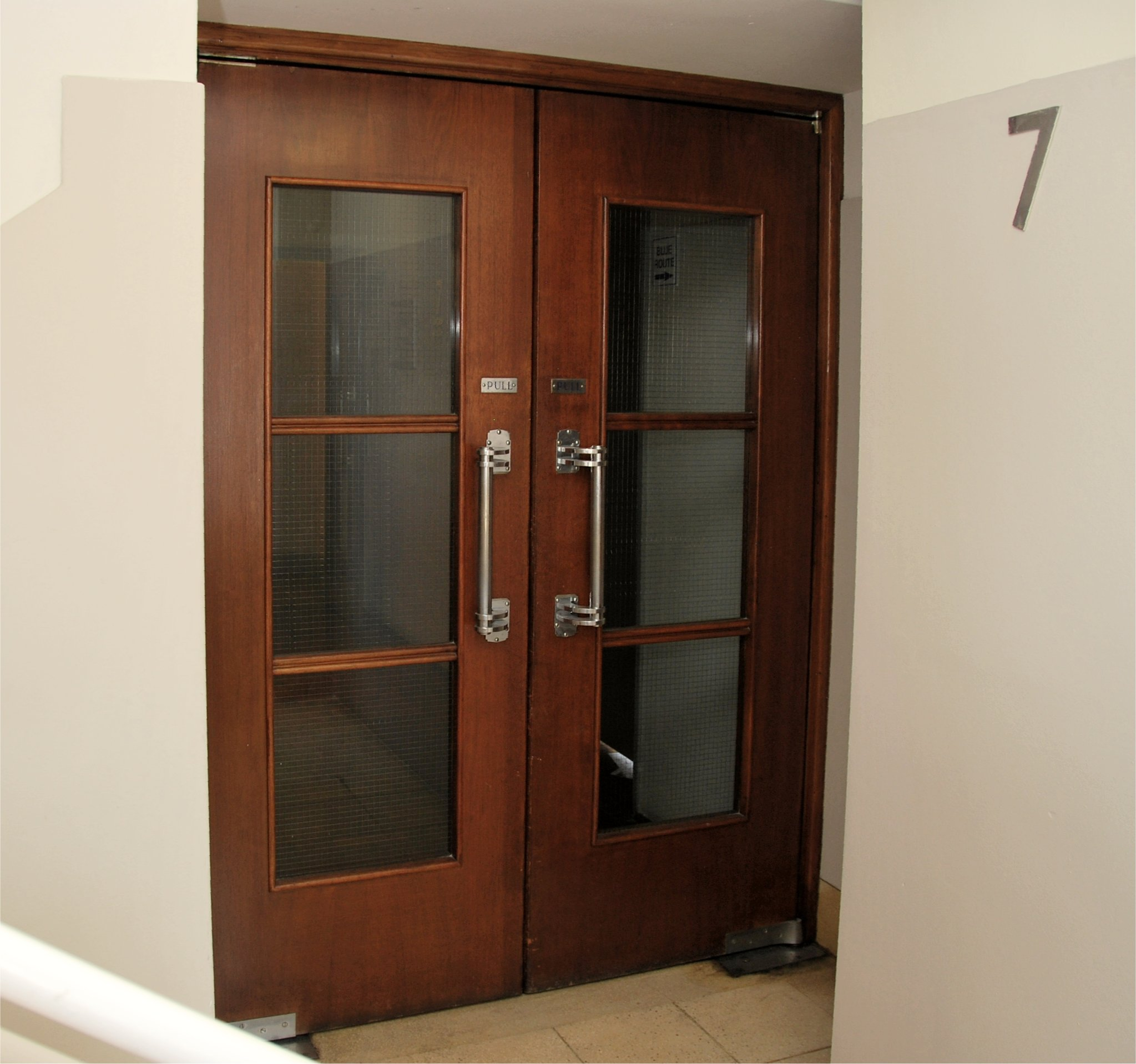
Original fire doors, with distinctive handles

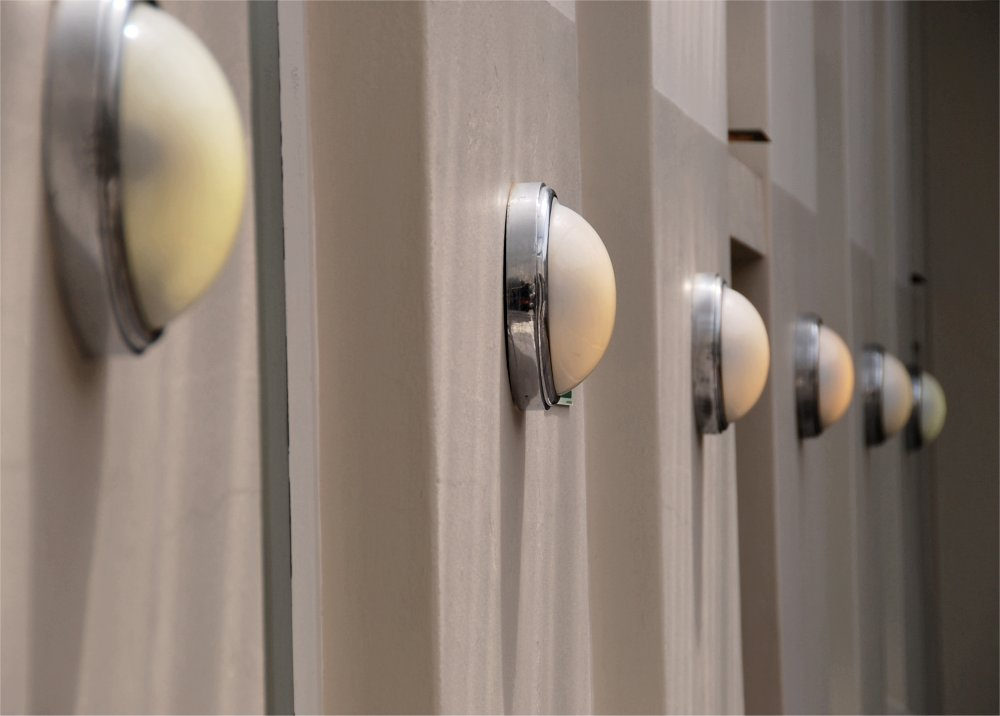
Bulkhead lights on the 9th level

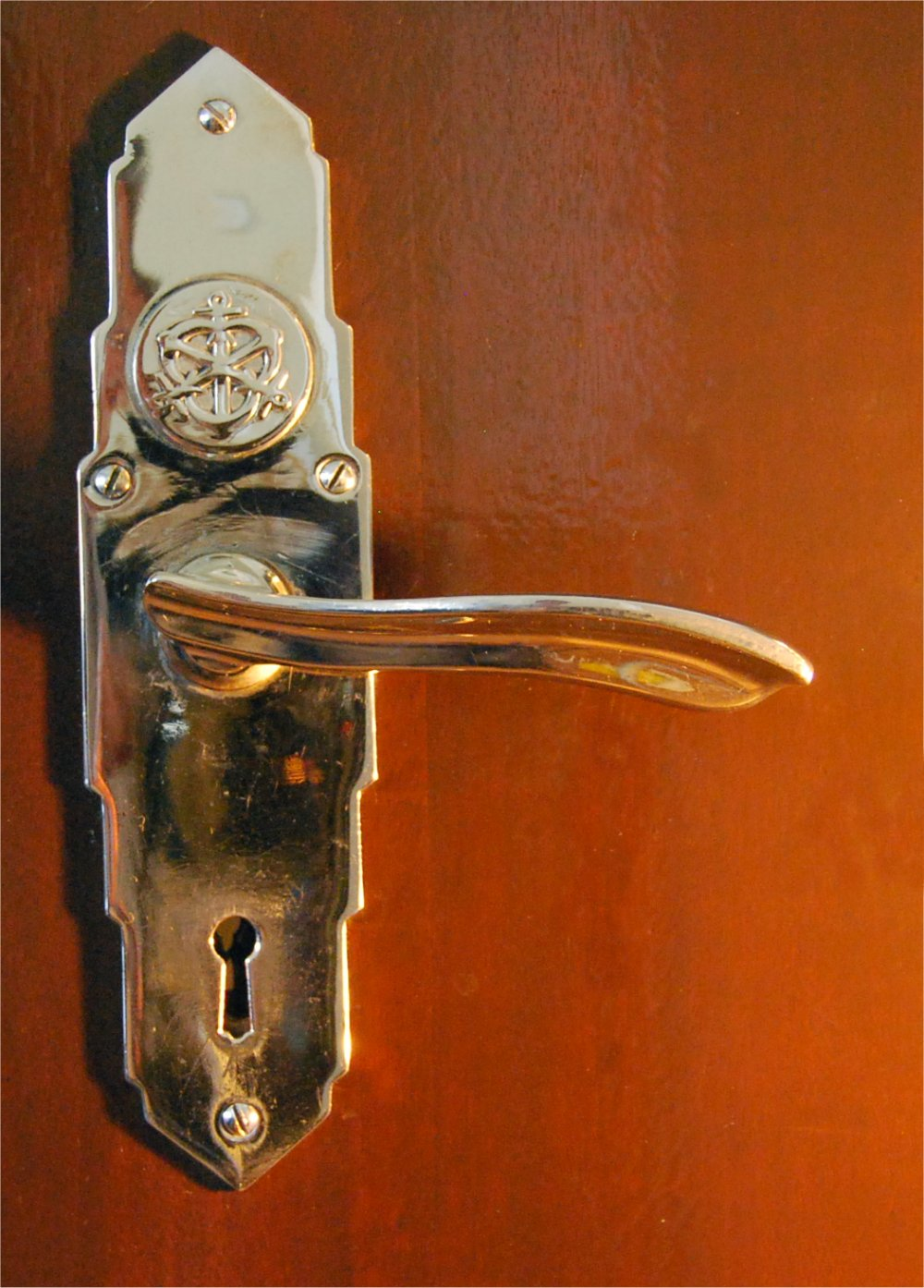
An original door handle (of which many remain)

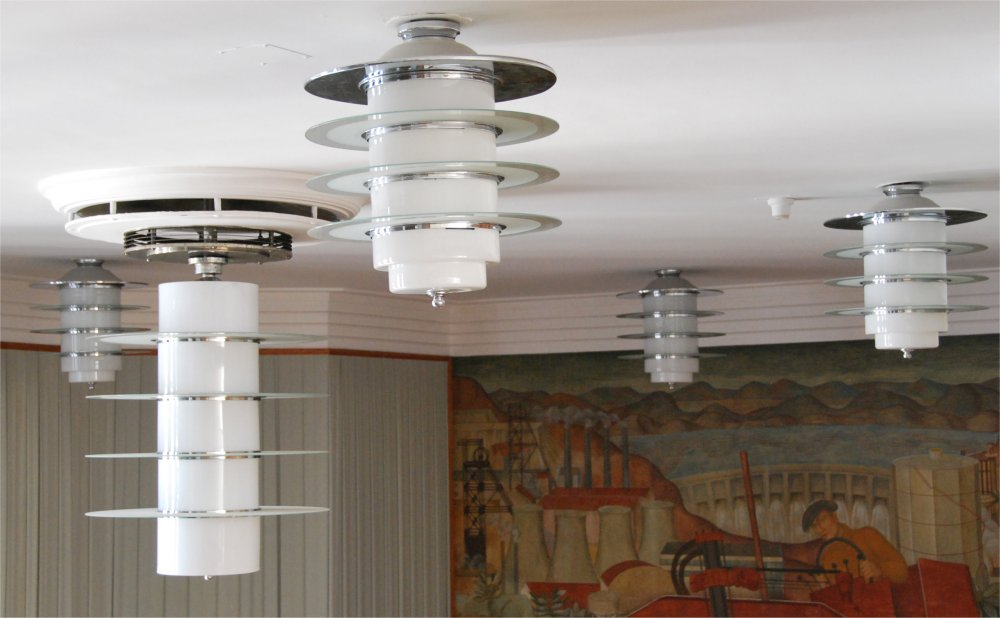
The light fittings in the Assembly Room

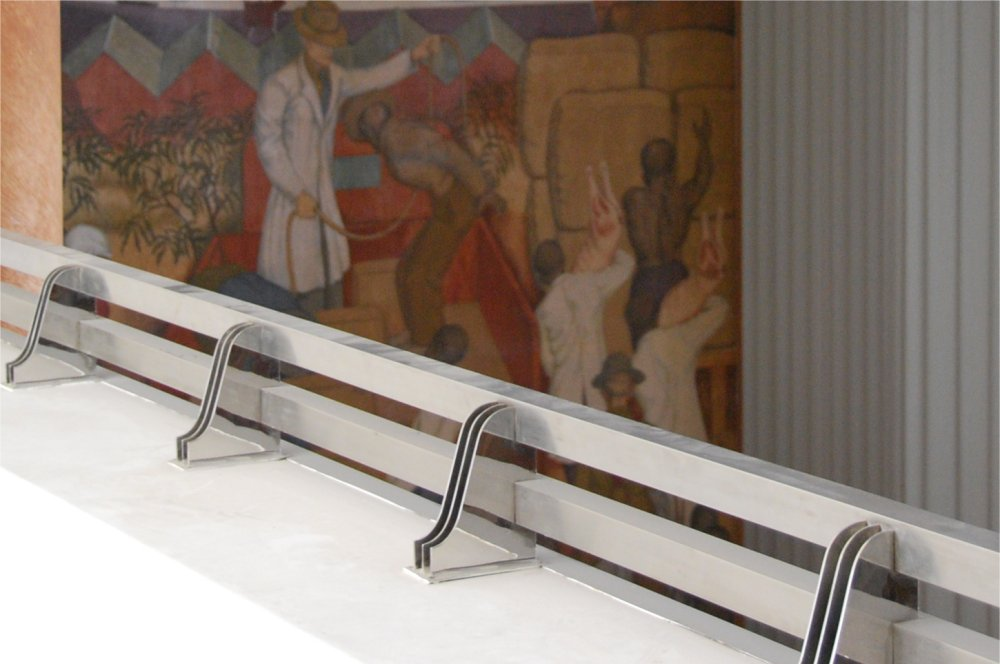
Detail of the rail at the gallery of the Assembly Room

The paragraphs below now visit each of the significant areas and features of the building in turn.

== Features of the building ==
The building incorporates a range of significant features.

=== The Entrance Hall ===
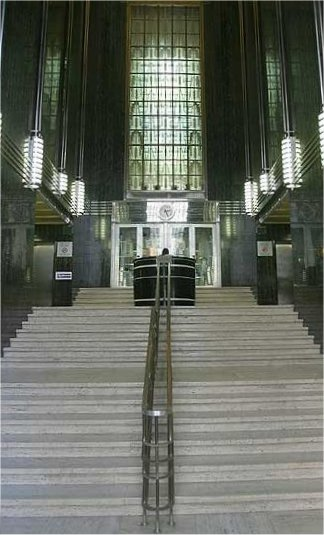
The entrance lobby

Black, gold-veined onyx is used in the Darling Street foyer, the ceiling of which is over 15 metres high and finished with gold leaf, laid by Italian workmen. The view of the glass window over the door to the banking hall (above) shows the iconic ziggurat shape of the building etched into the glass. Visitors must climb 17 steps to gain access to the banking hall, and towards the top they are met by the original "pill box" where security staff can observe who (and what) is entering and leaving the building. On either side of the pill box are the entrances to the main lifts – two on the left and two on the right (there are two "staff" lifts and one "service" lift elsewhere in the building).

Characteristic stainless steel trim and light fittings, such as can be seen here, are used extensively throughout the building.

=== The Banking Hall ===
Given its tall marble-clad colonnades, the banking hall would be more properly described as an example of "neo-classicism" although the light fittings echo the art deco theme that prevails elsewhere in the building, and again we see that the glass over the doors (at the far end in the photograph below) are etched with the ziggurat form that is taken by the whole building.

The two service counters that can be seen in the banking hall look identical, but only the one on the right is original—the one on the left is a later, somewhat inferior copy that has since been removed.

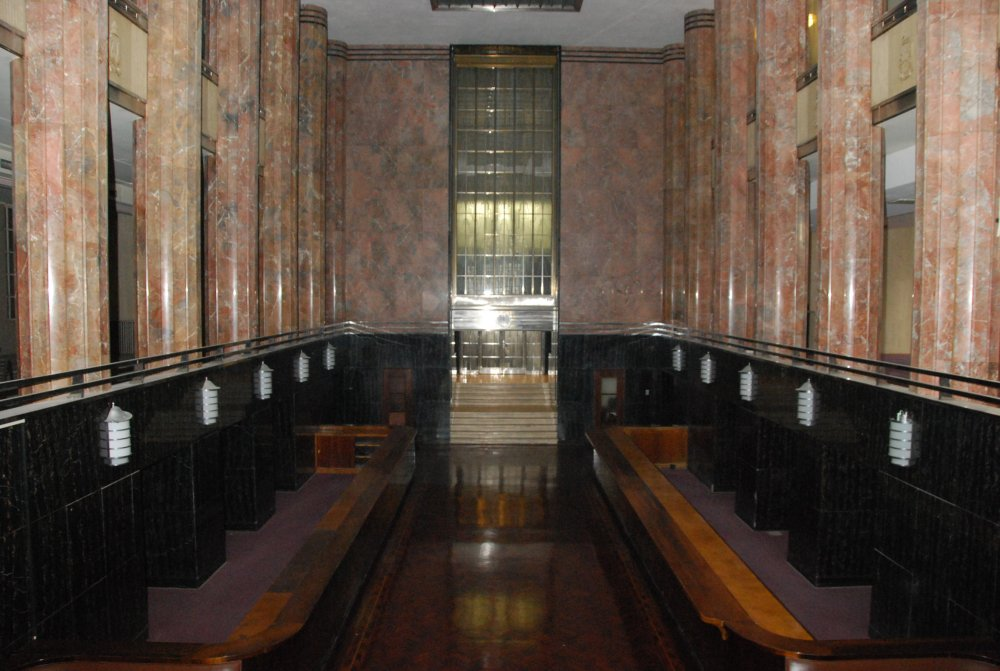
The banking hall

Between the columns of the banking hall the coats of arms are presented for each of the many provinces and countries within Southern Africa in which the South African Mutual Life Assurance Society had a presence.

The crests that appear between the columns in the banking hall

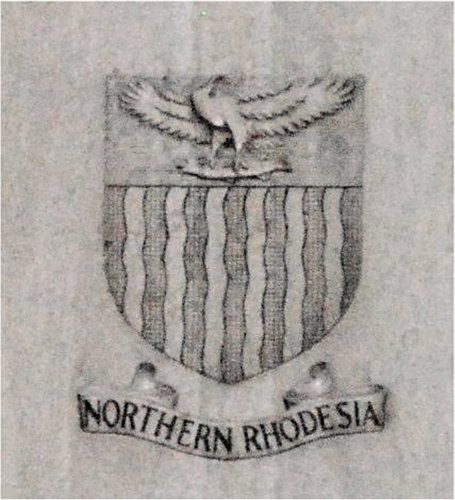
Northern Rhodesia

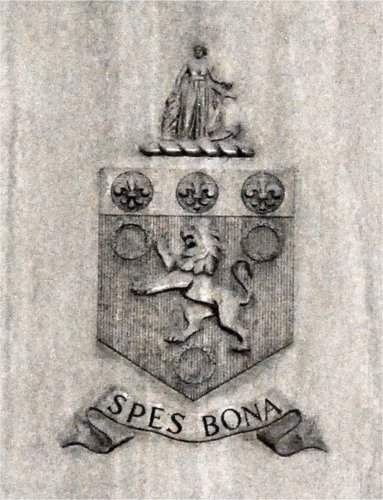
Cape Colony

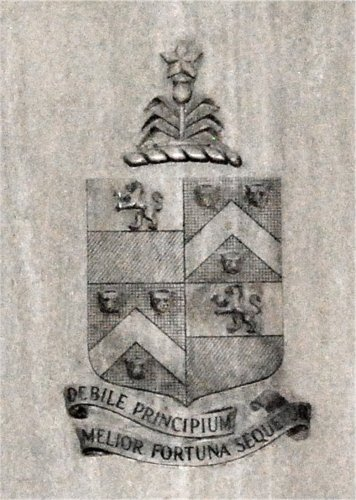
Durban

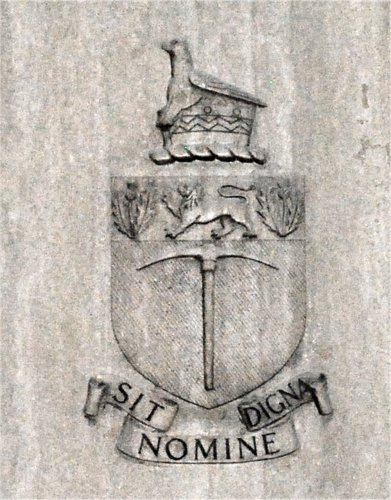
Rhodesia

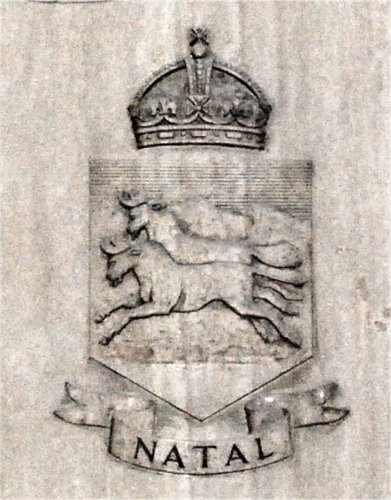
Natal

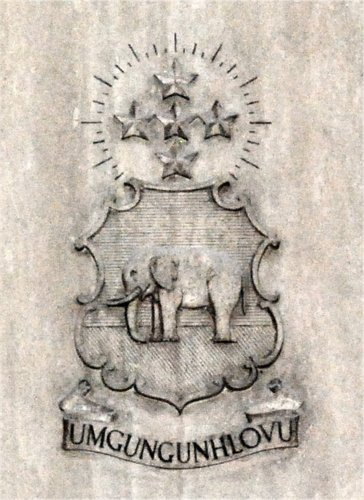
Petermaritzburg

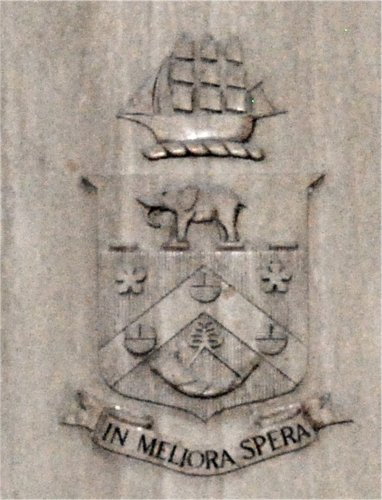
Port Elizabeth

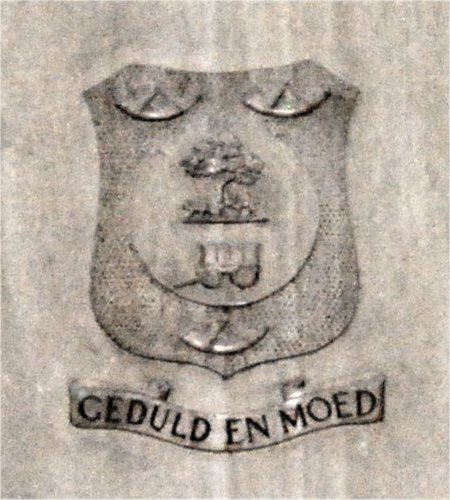
Orange Free State

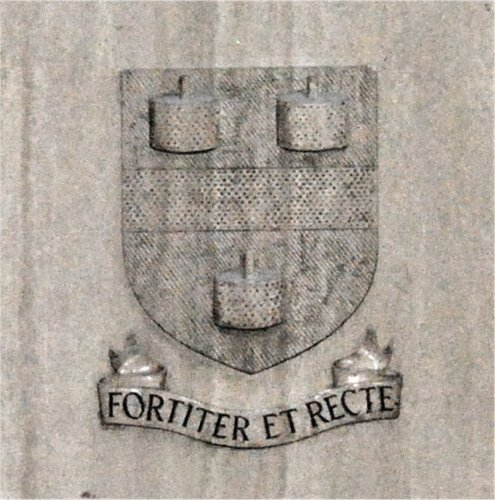
Johannesburg

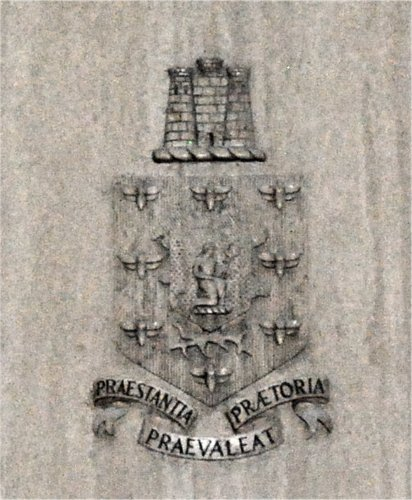
Pretoria

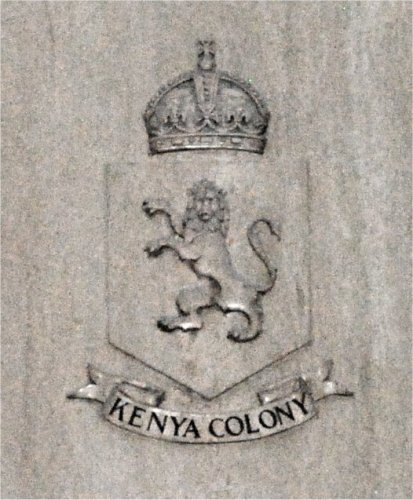
Kenya Colony

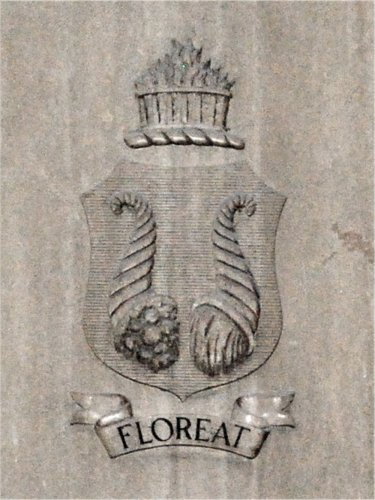
Bloemfontein

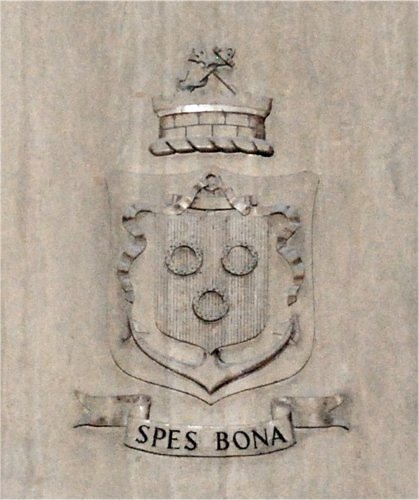
Cape Town

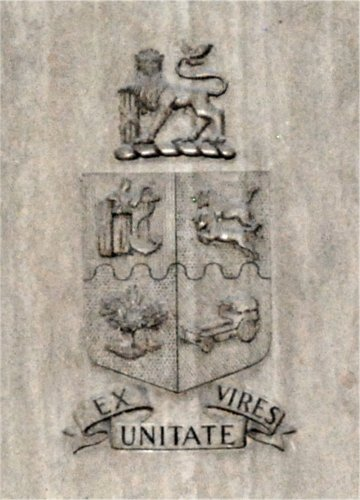
Union of South Africa

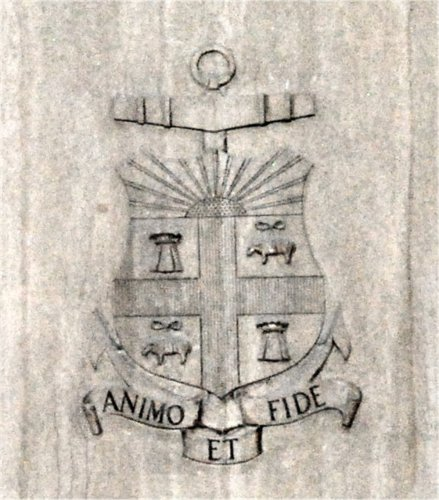
Potchefstroom

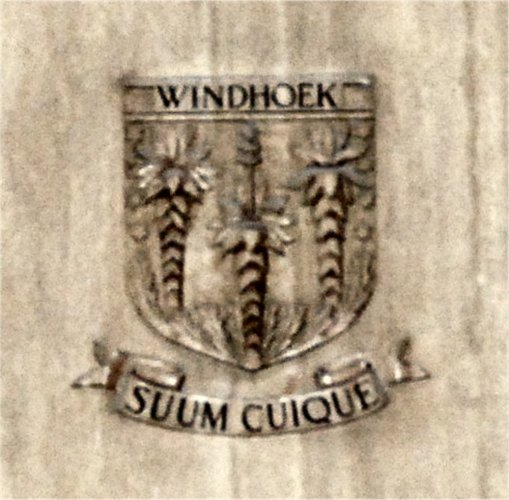
Windhoek

The banking hall is now owned privately and is available for hire as an events venue.

=== The lifts (elevators) ===
The original lifts in the building are fast ("the fastest in Africa" it was claimed when the building opened) and no expense was spared – even in the basement parking area, the lifts are trimmed with black marble. Each door has an etched representation of an indigenous bird or animal from South Africa, with significant plants as additional decoration, or in some cases the corporate logo of the time. [Difficulty in sourcing spare parts eventually led to a major project to renew the lifts, 20 years after the conclusion of the conversion project. Three of the six passenger lifts were decommissioned, three others and the service lift were replaced. The heritage features of the original lifts were carefully preserved.]

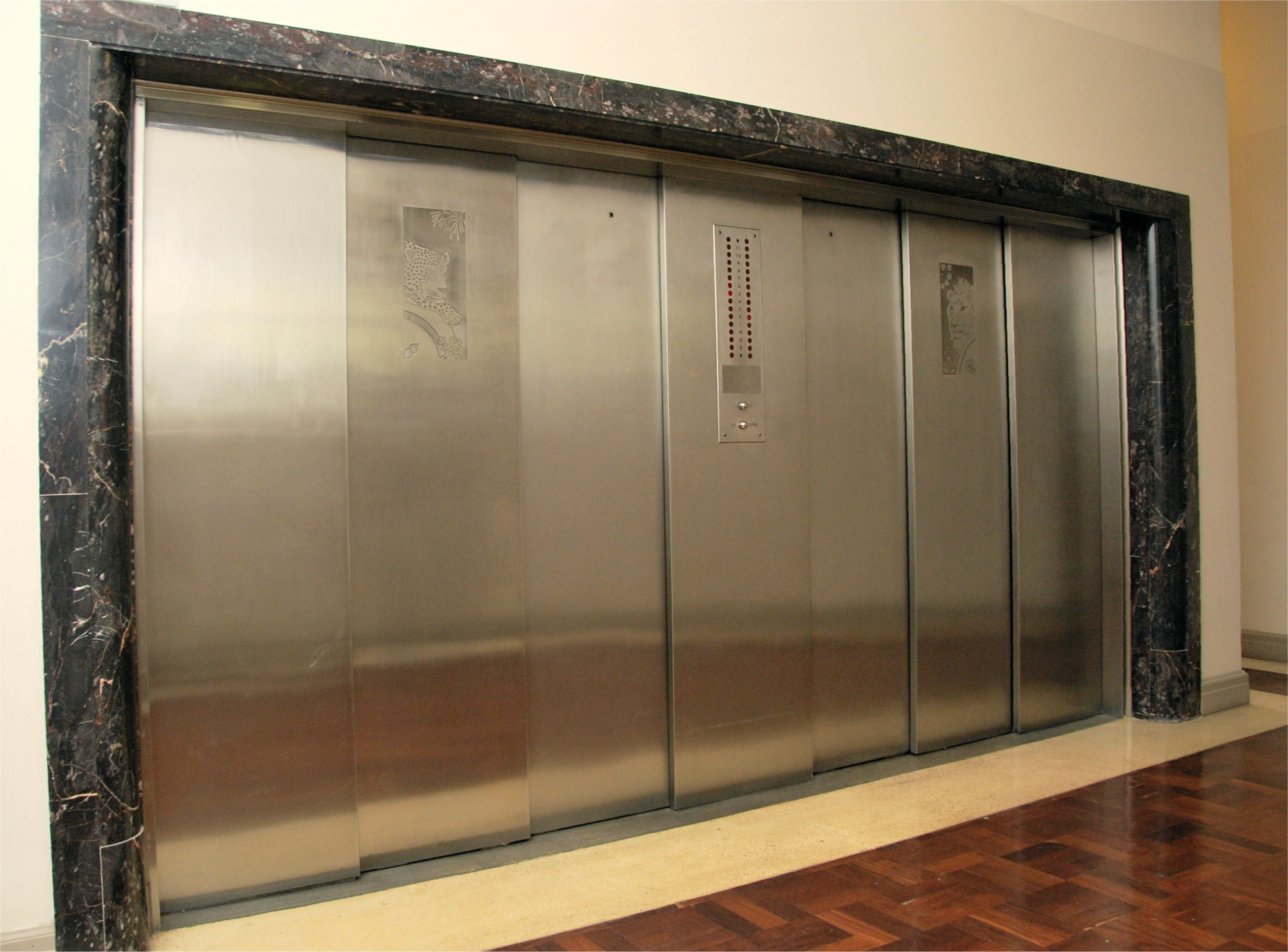
There were seven lifts in the building, four of them "principal" lifts (as here)

The individual etchings in detail (click on the images to see the full-size version):

The individual etchings on the lift doors

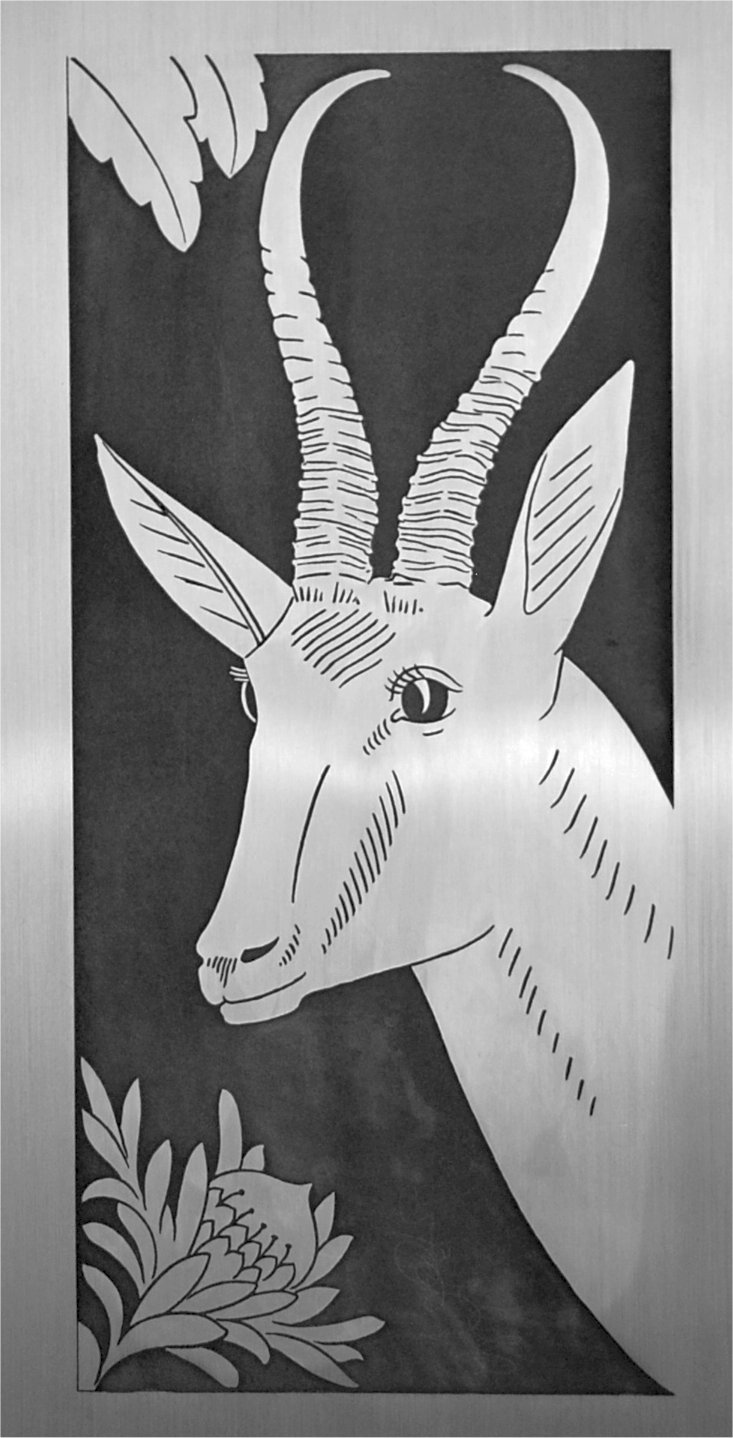
Springbok (Antidorcas marsupialis), with a king protea (Protea cynaroides), the national flower

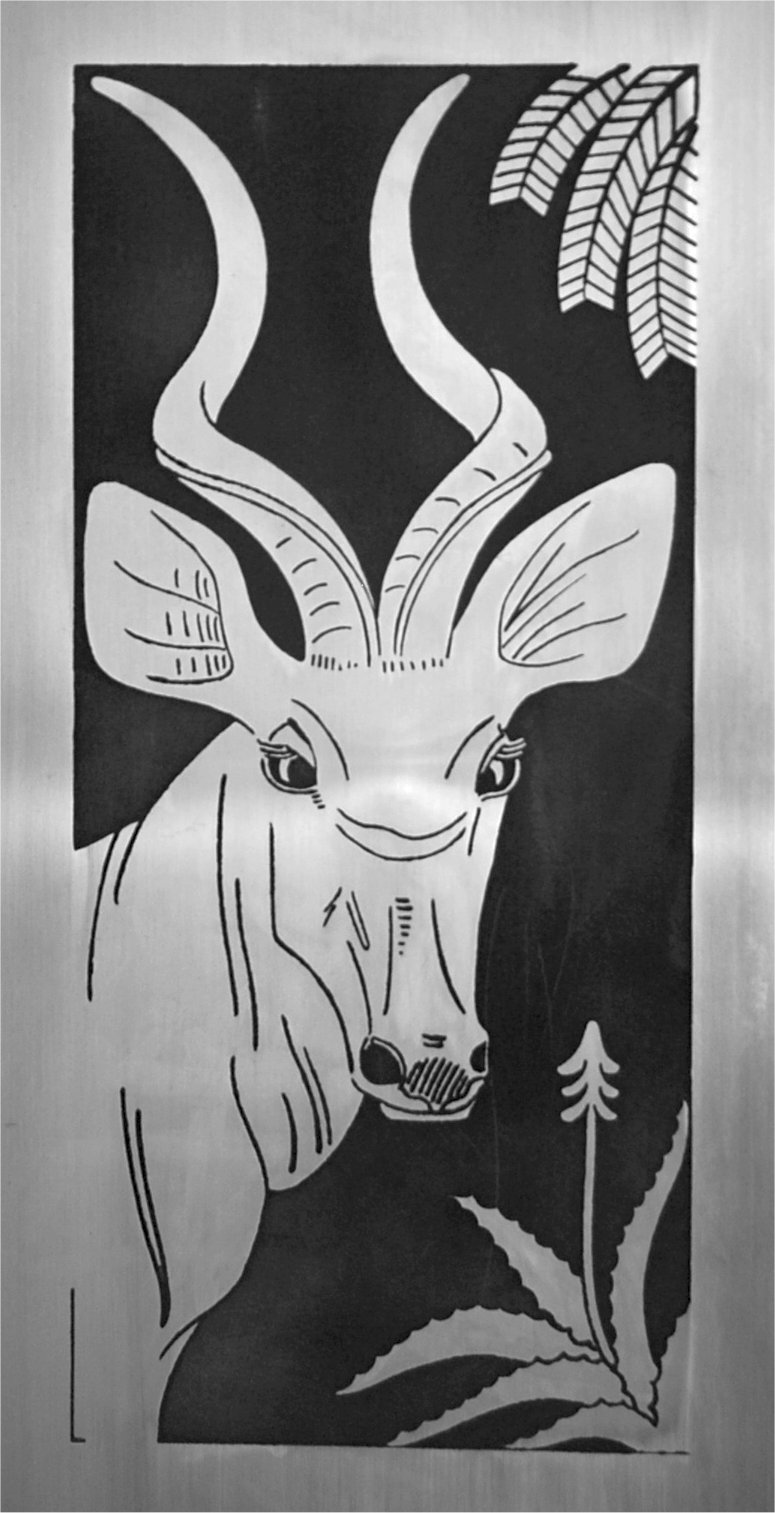
Kudu (Tragelaphus), with veltheimia (Veltheimia bracteata) at the lower right

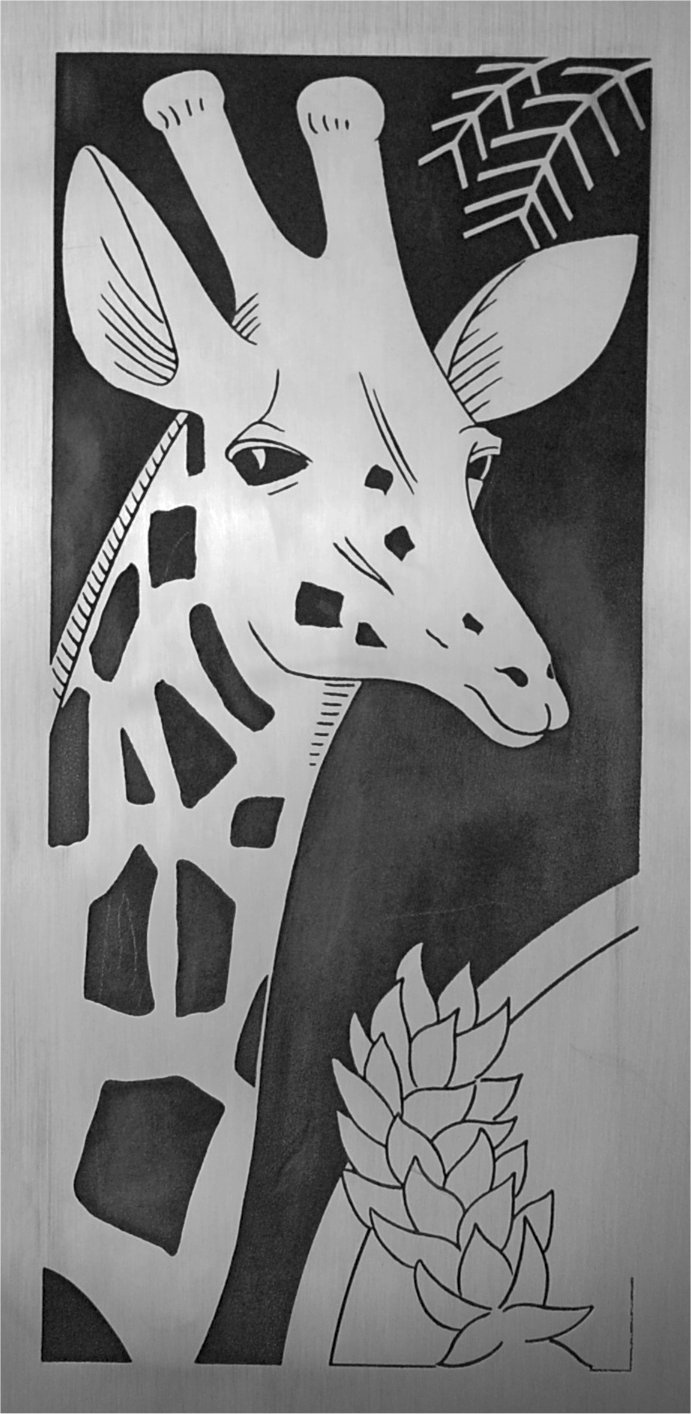
Giraffe, with a succulent (Crassula)

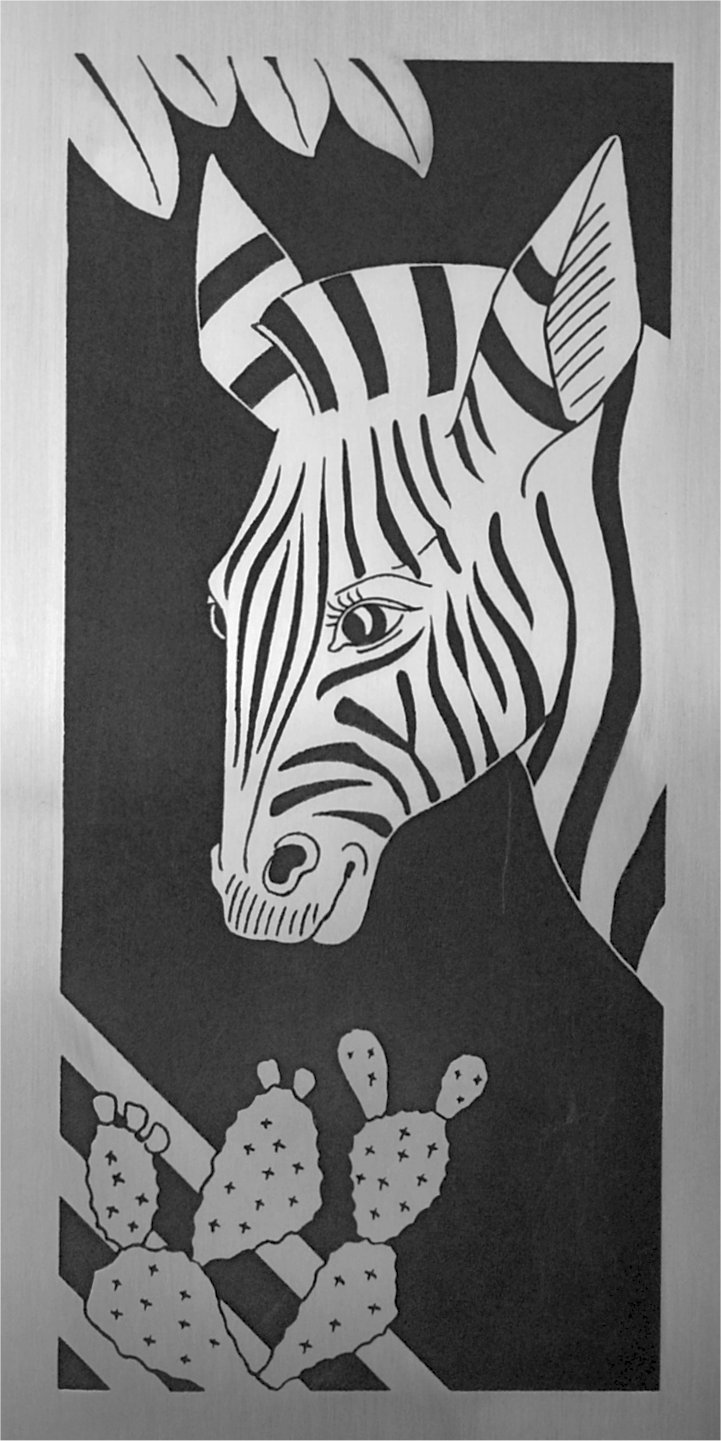
Zebra (Equus quagga), with a prickly pear (Opuntia ficus-indica)

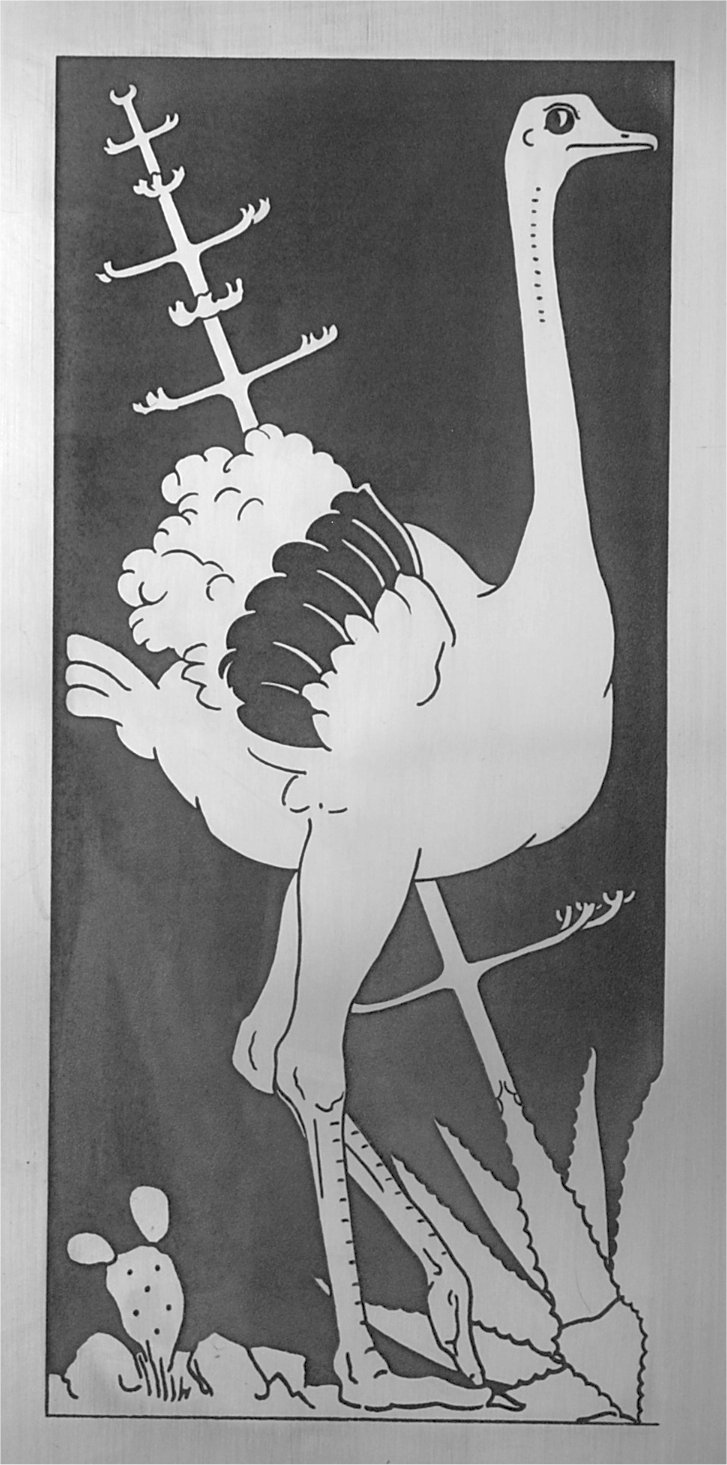
Ostrich (Struthio camelus australus), with prickly pear (lower left) and "century plant" (Agave americana)

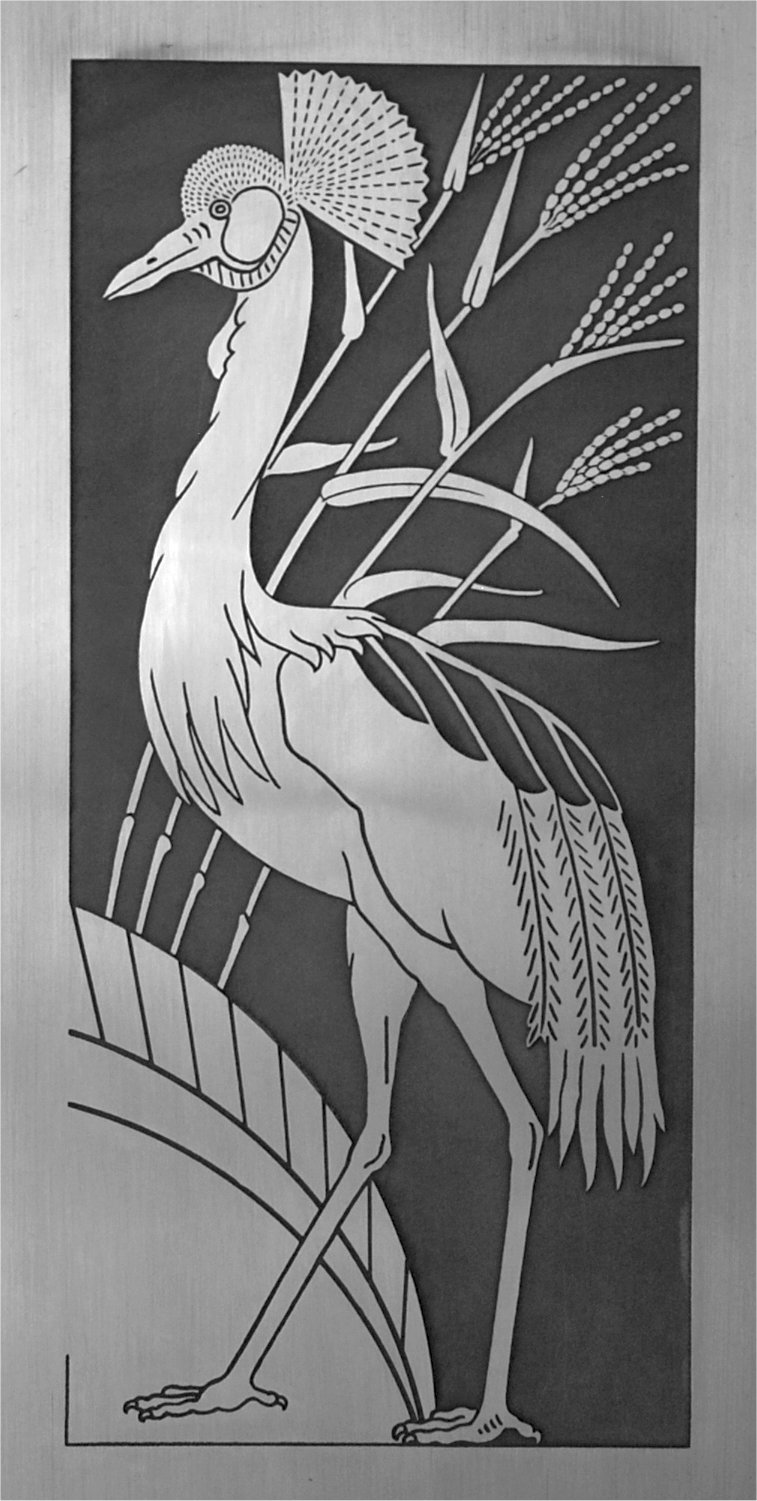
Crane (Balearica regulorm) with reeds behind (Phragmites australis)

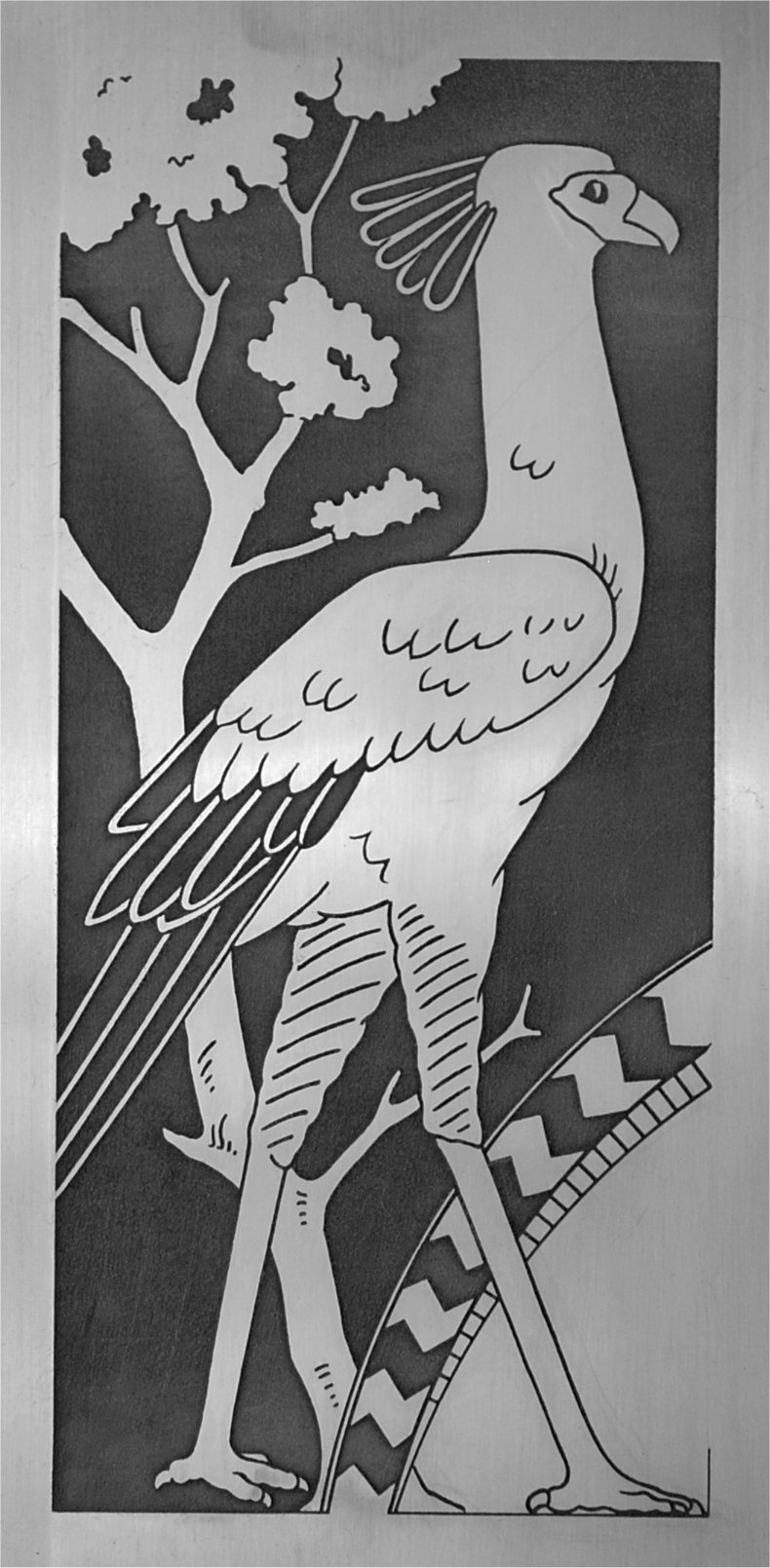
Secretary bird (Sagittarius serpentarius), with unidentifiable tree

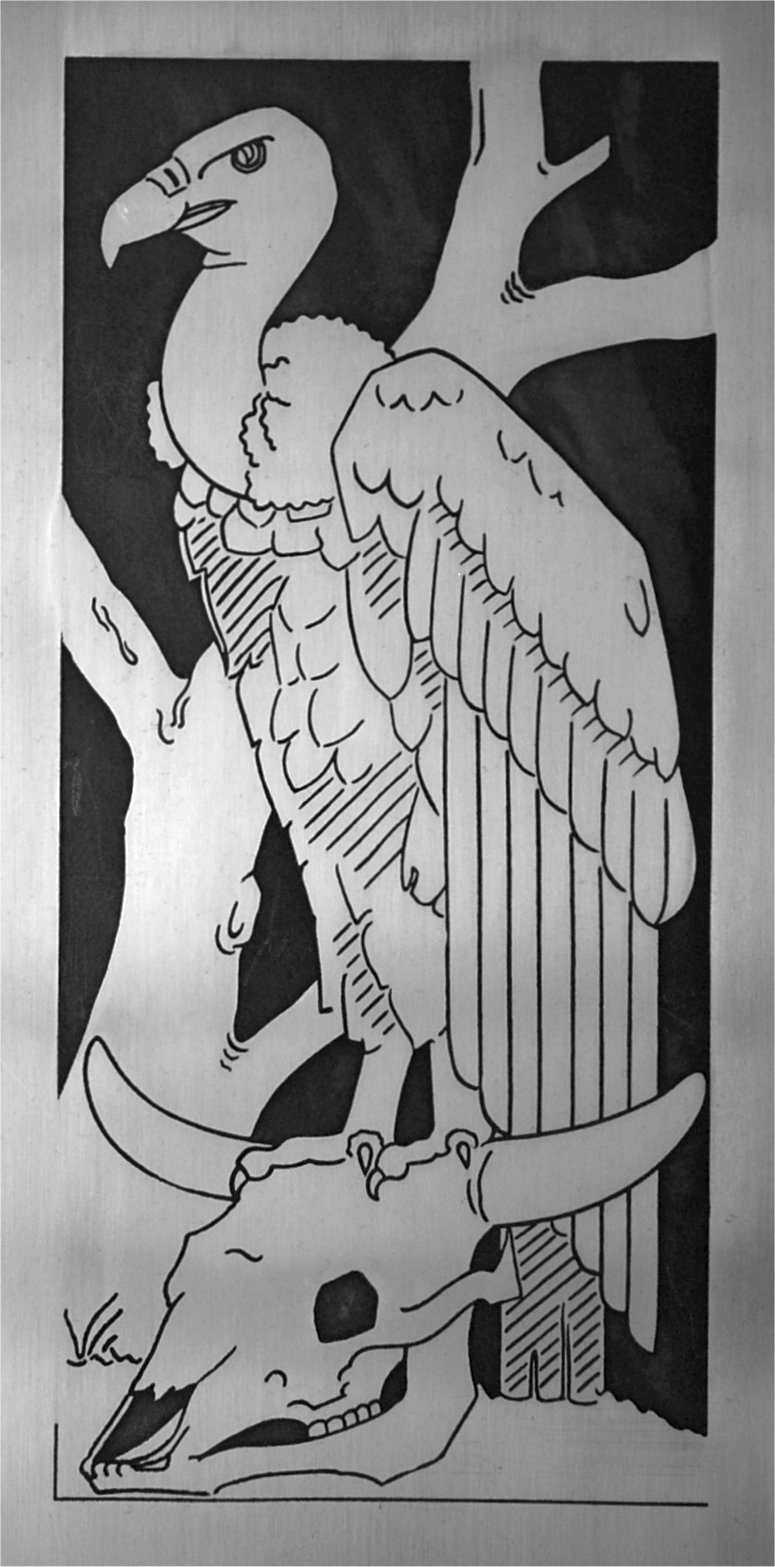
Vulture

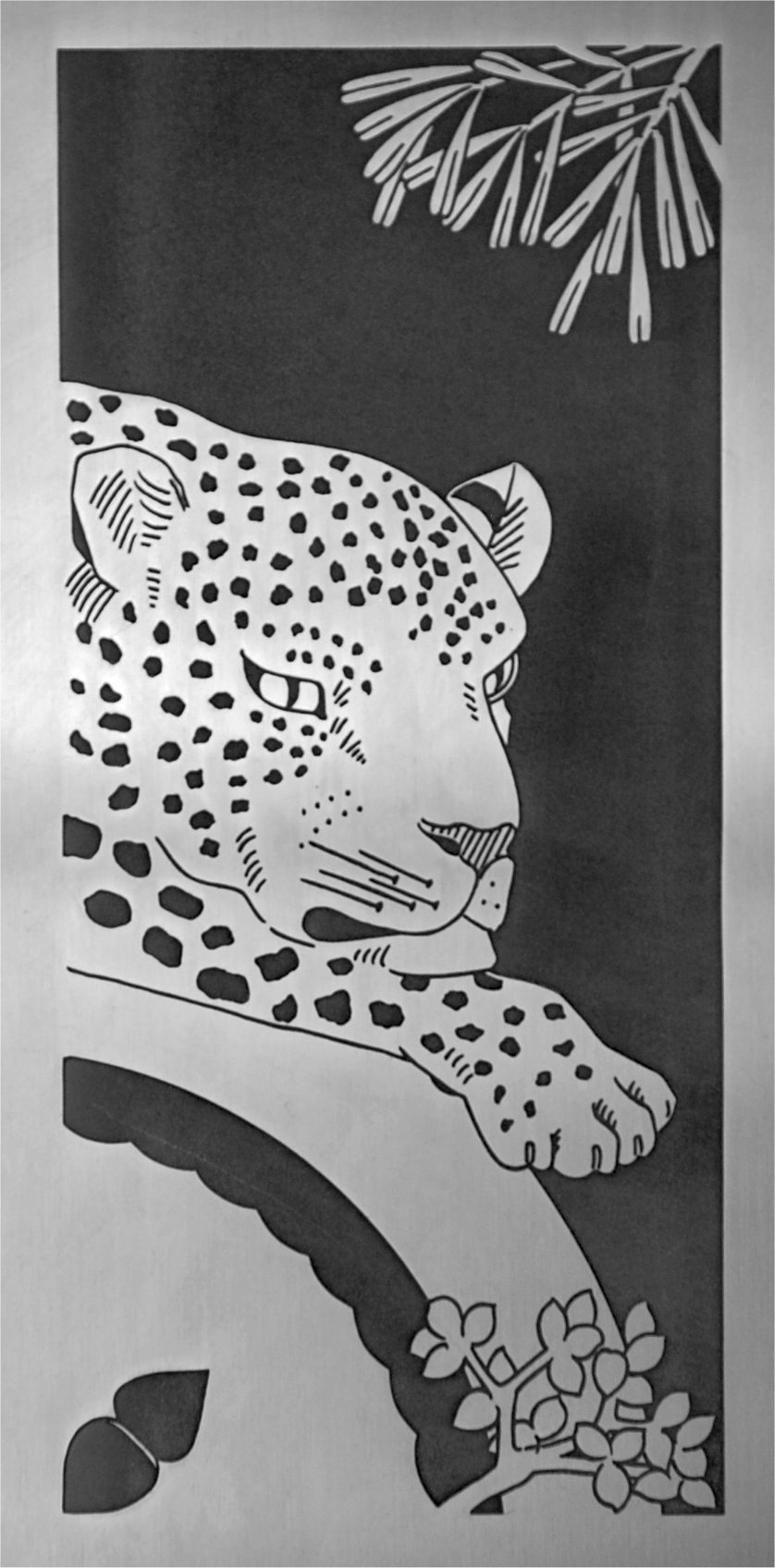
Leopard (Panthera pardus pardus), with spekboom (Portulacaria afra) at the lower right and candelabra lily (Brunsvigia josephinae) at the lower left

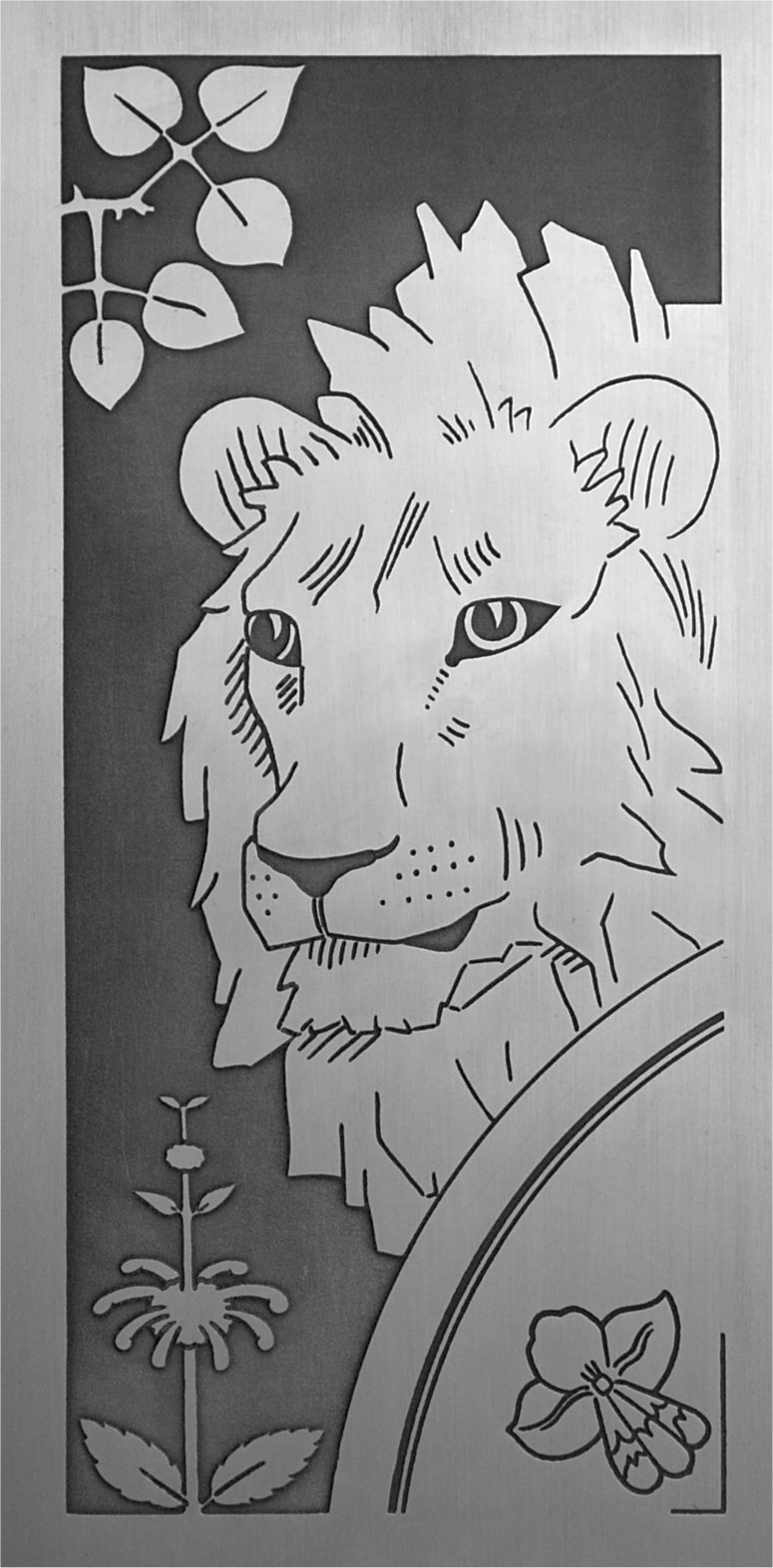
Lion, with lion's tail (or wild dagga - Leonotis leonuris) at lower left, violet painted petals (Freesia laxa) lower right and coral tree (Erythrina lysistemon) at the top

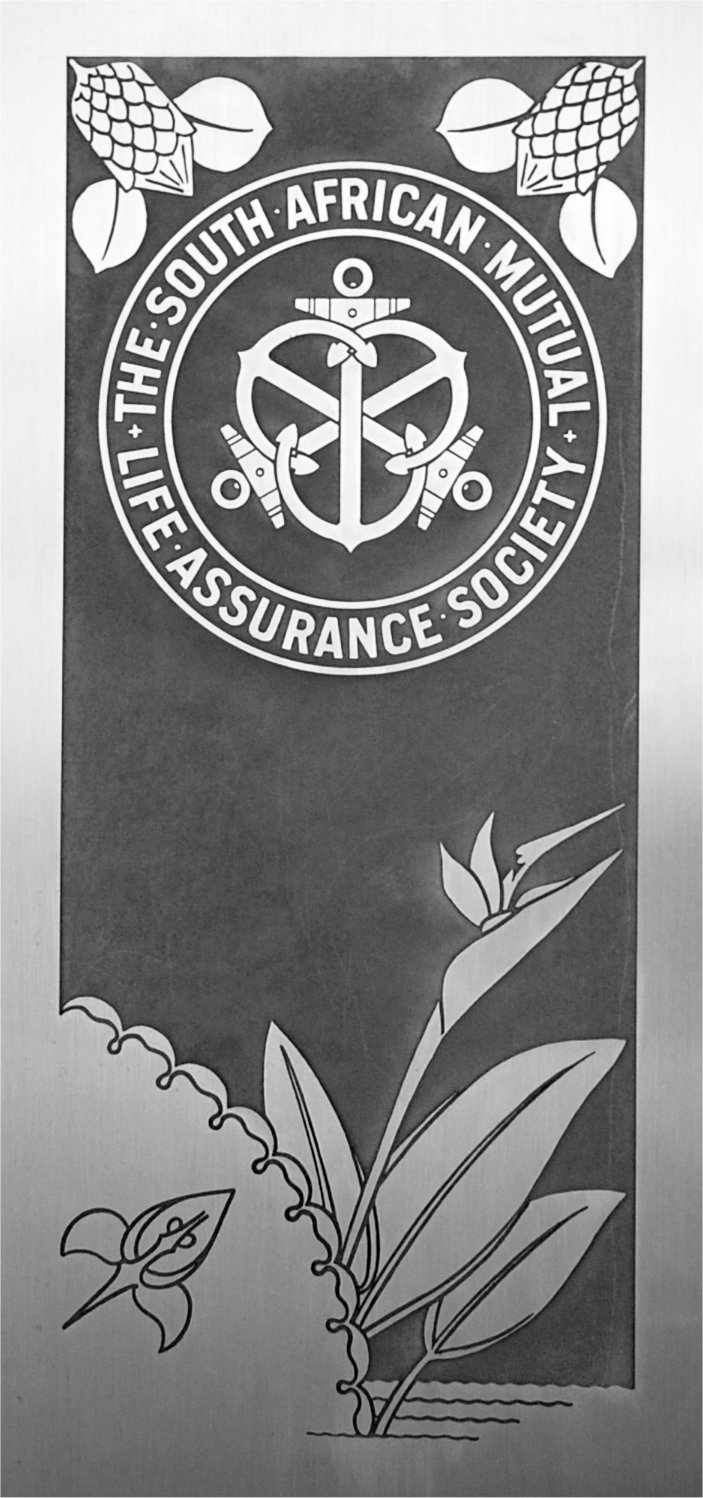
The corporate "logo" (three entwined anchors), with Strelitzia reginae (bottom right), Disa uniflora (bottom left) and proteas (Protea repens) at the top

These designs are attributed to Ivan Mitford-Barberton.

=== The Assembly Room ===
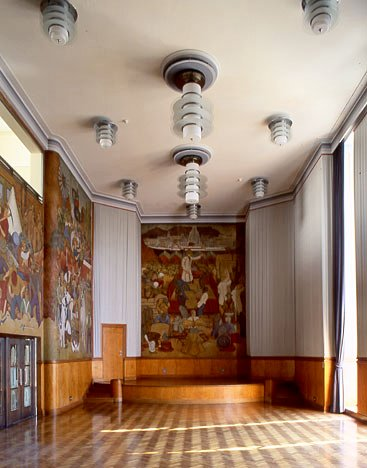
The Assembly Room

Perhaps the best known feature of the building (in artistic circles at least) is the Assembly Room, sometimes referred to as the "Fresco Room"; Freschi indicates that this was originally intended as a facility for policy holders. Here there are striking frescoes depicting some of the history of the nation of South Africa, undertaken by Le Roux Smith Le Roux two years after the completion of the building.

Le Roux was supported in his early career by the famous British architect Herbert Baker, who provided bursaries so that Le Roux could spend time in London and elsewhere. In London he undertook a mural in South Africa House with Eleanor Esmonde-White. An acquaintance (still living) of Le Roux and Esmonde-White recalls that Baker insisted that Eleanor Esmonde-White be awarded a bursary, despite gender-related objections from elsewhere; in the event she got to go to London with Le Roux, with the bursary. Following their years in London, Le Roux was awarded this commission to work on the Mutual Building and he therefore returned to Cape Town, but only after the main building work was done - it was not sensible to undertake this meticulous work while building operations were still in progress.

These frescoes are considered elsewhere as good examples of the genre—see for example "Decopix - the Art Deco Architecture Site" where the Mutual Building itself is well represented. The five frescoes on the end walls and over the entrance depict more than 100 years of the history of the nation, including industrial development, the Great Trek, mining following the discovery of gold, the growth of industry and agriculture, and a hint of international travel and trade. Freschi considers that ".. in contemporary terms, Le Roux's work was seen to be distinctly progressive and very much in keeping with the ostensibly liberal party line of Jan Smuts' coalition government".

The panels are reproduced below, and selected portions from them are provided in the images that follow.

The five panels are presented left to right, in a clockwise direction when standing in the Assembly Room, back to the windows. The first and fifth are on the side walls, the second, third and fourth are on the long wall that includes the main entrance.

The fresco panels in the Assembly Room

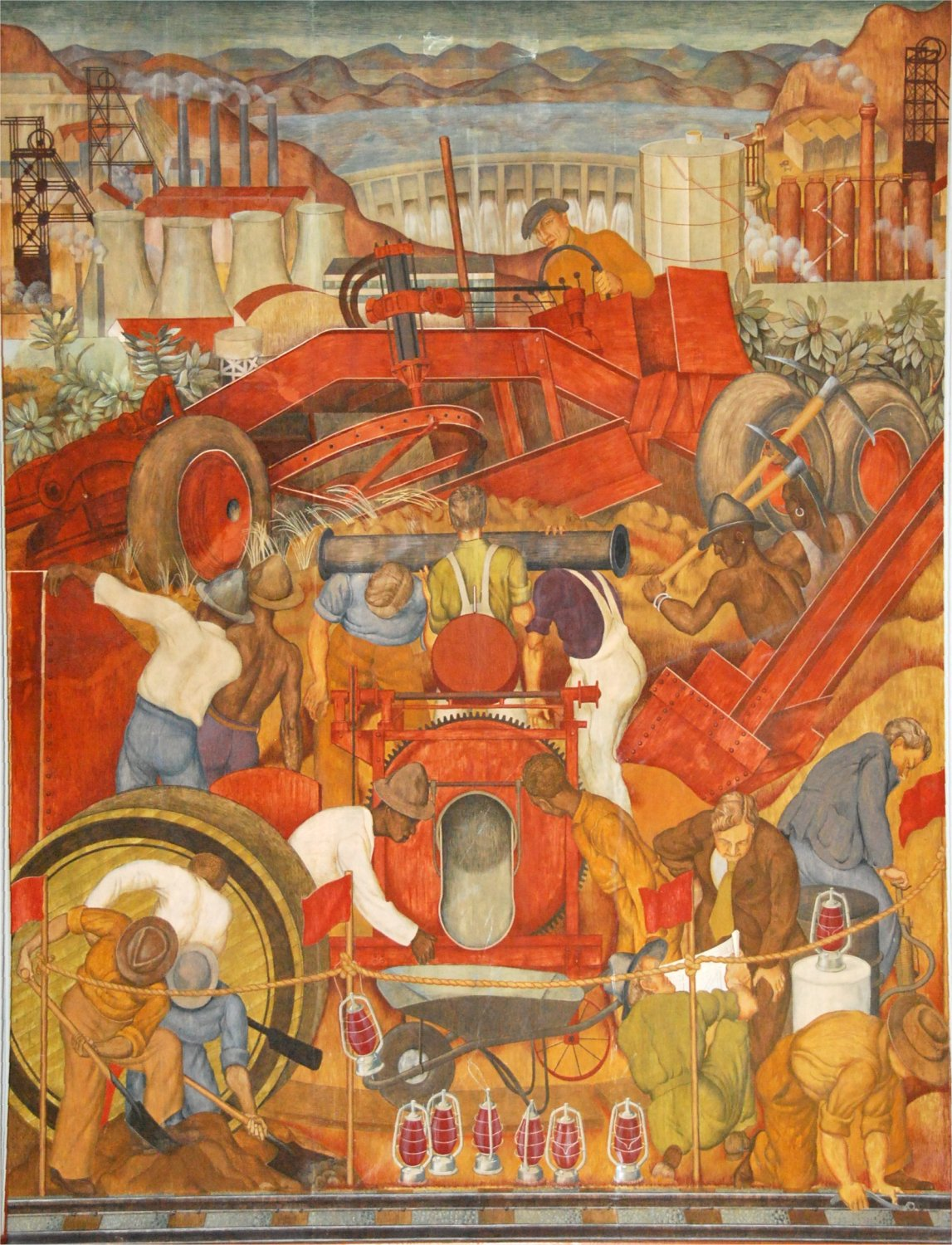
Engineering water, building industry and railroads

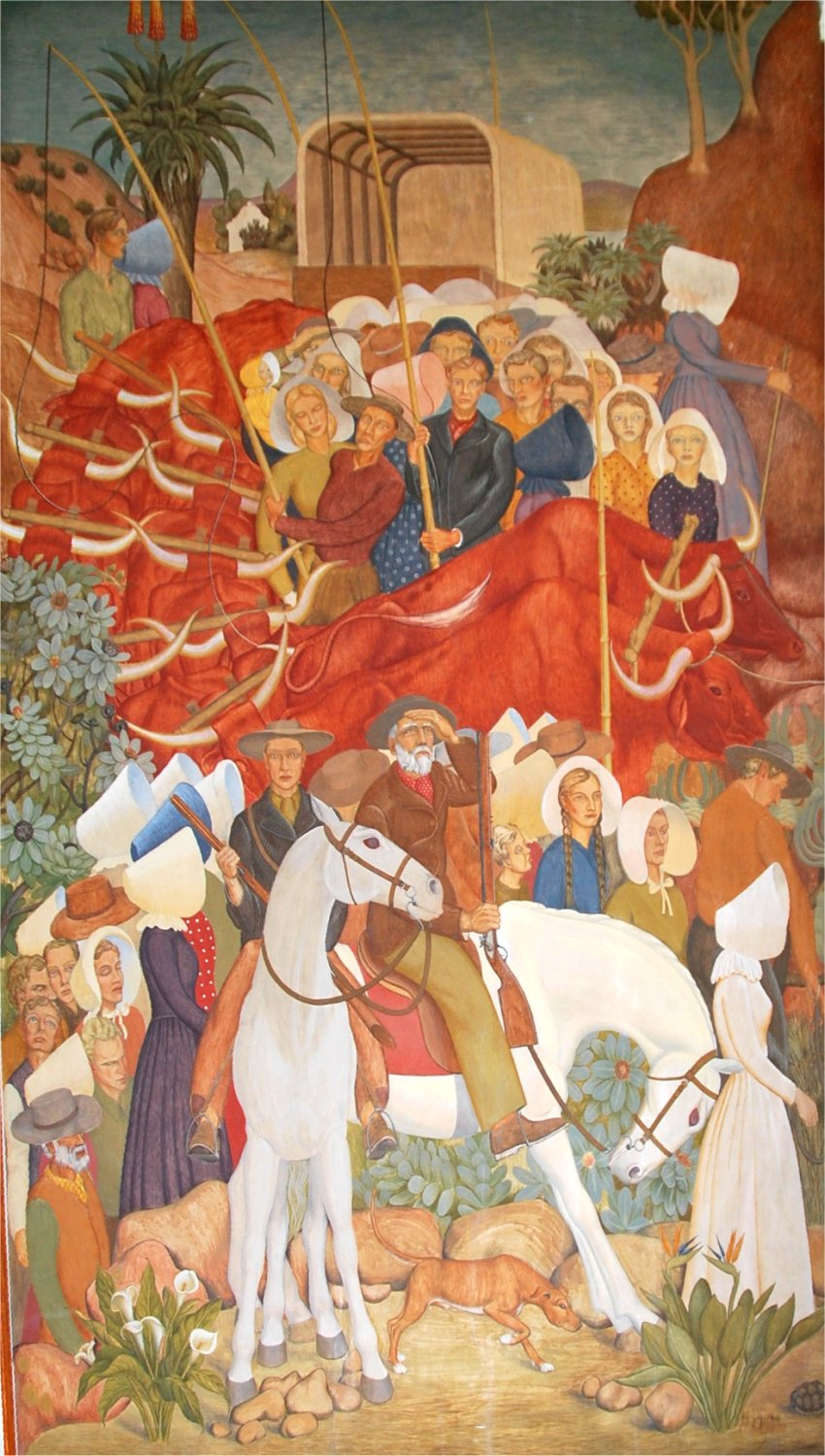
The Great Trek

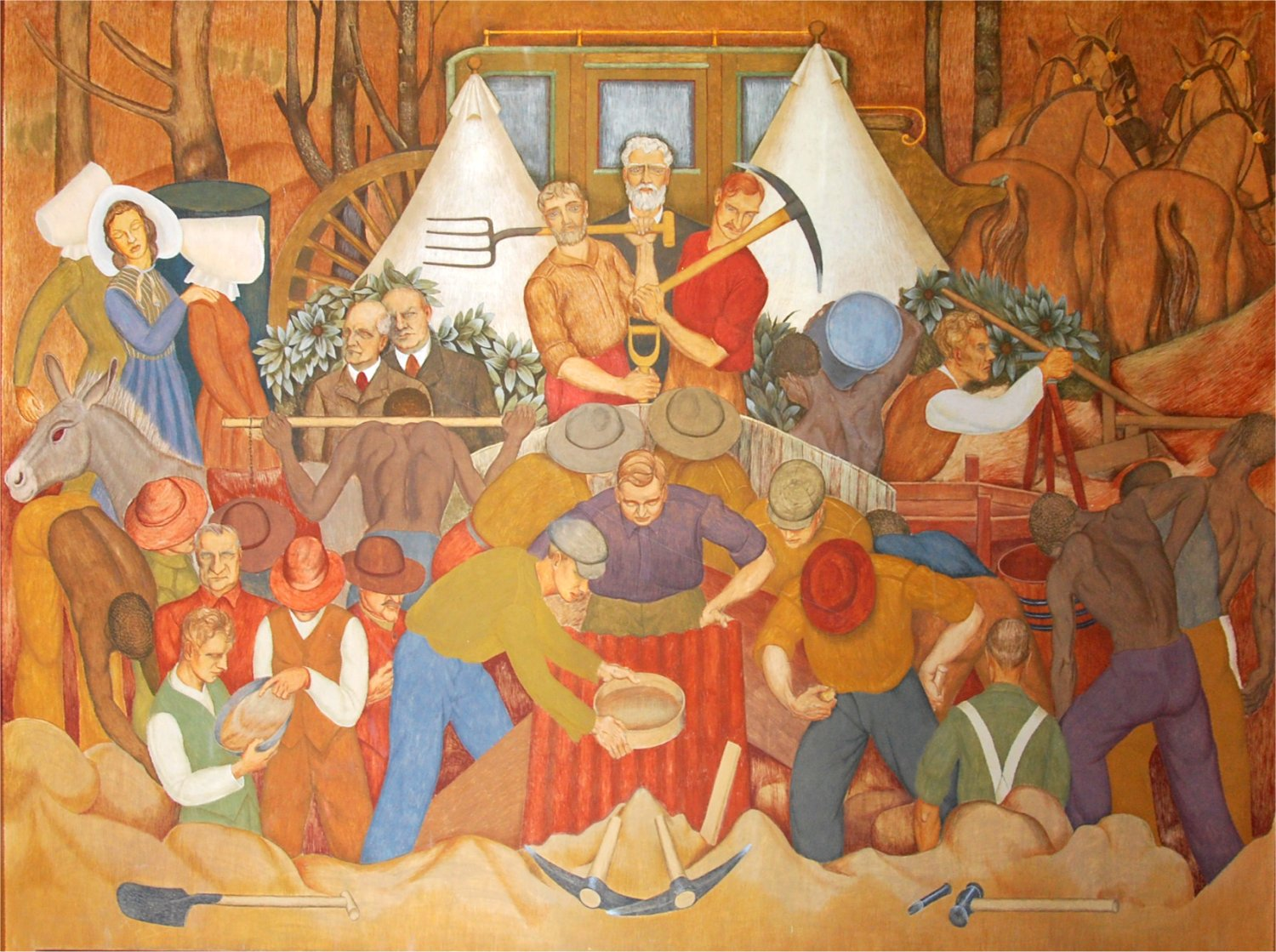
The discovery of gold

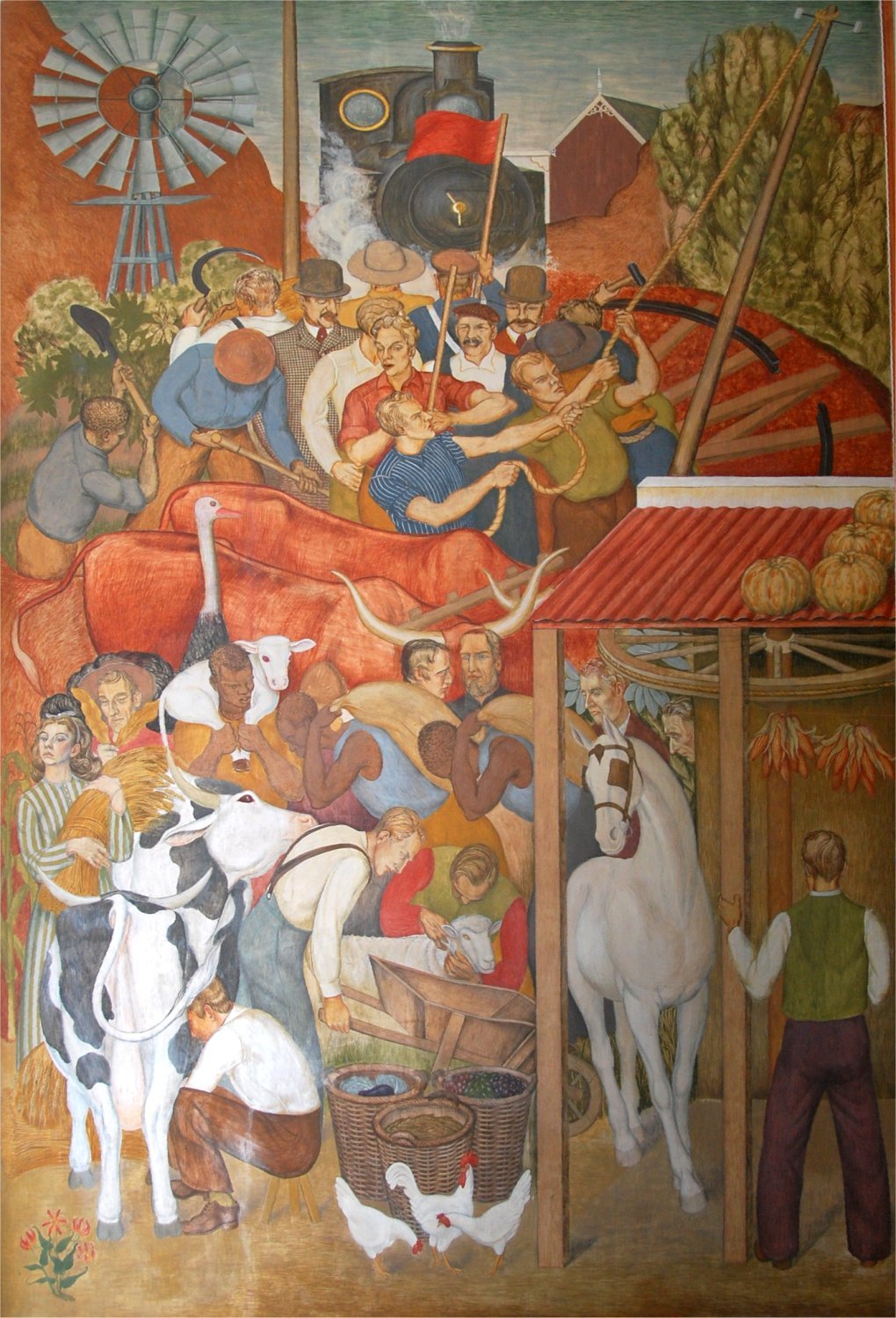
Railroads in service, productive farms

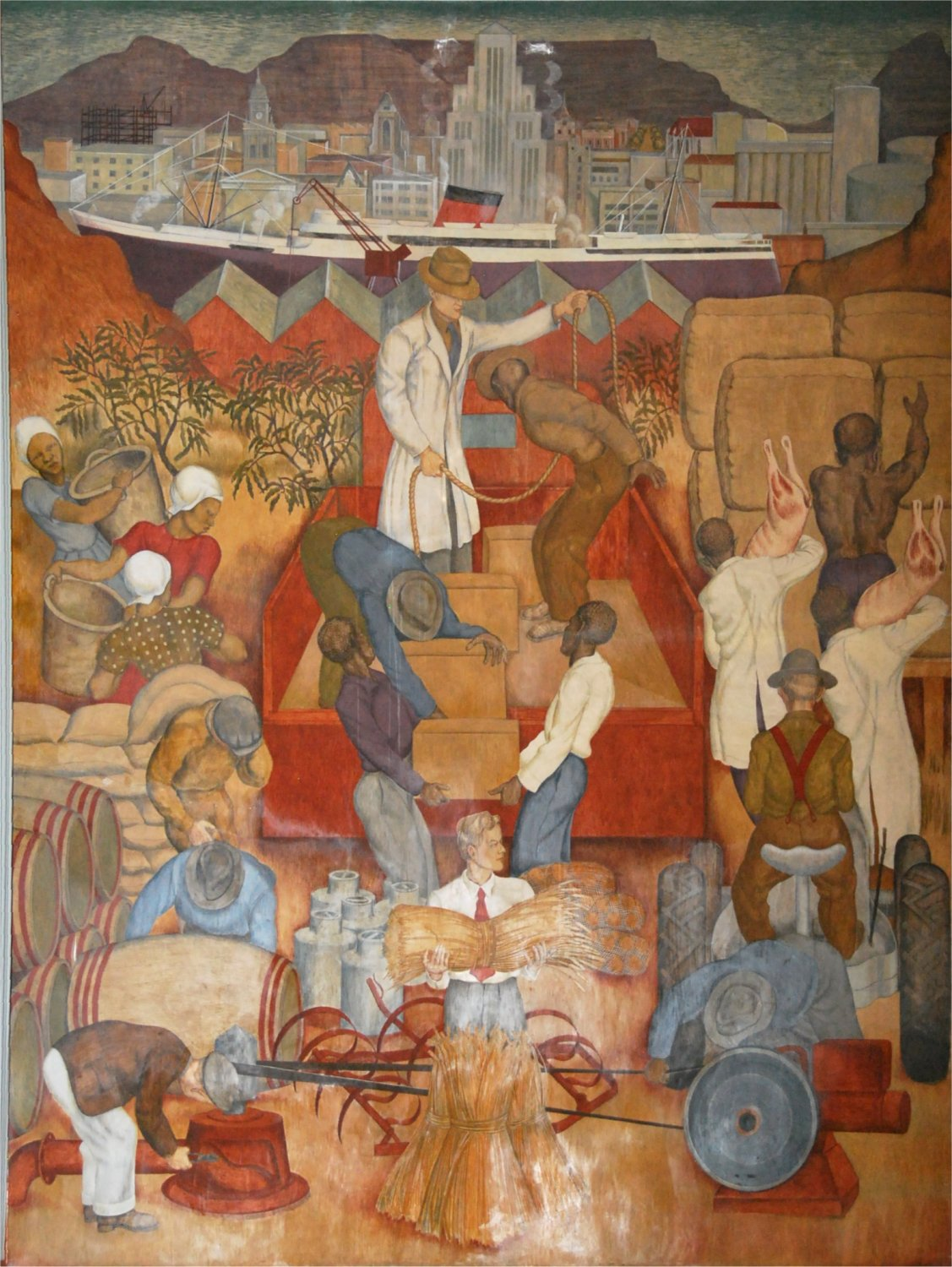
Trade and international travel

The fifth image includes a representation of the Mutual Building itself, the tallest building in what is known as the "City Bowl", below the slopes of Table Mountain. This did not remain true for long, it was only one year later that the General Post Office was built on the other (seaward side) of Darling Street, and a large number of larger more modern buildings have been built since (see the views from and of the building, shown further down this page).

Some details from the panels:

Some selected portions of the fresco panels in the Assembly Room

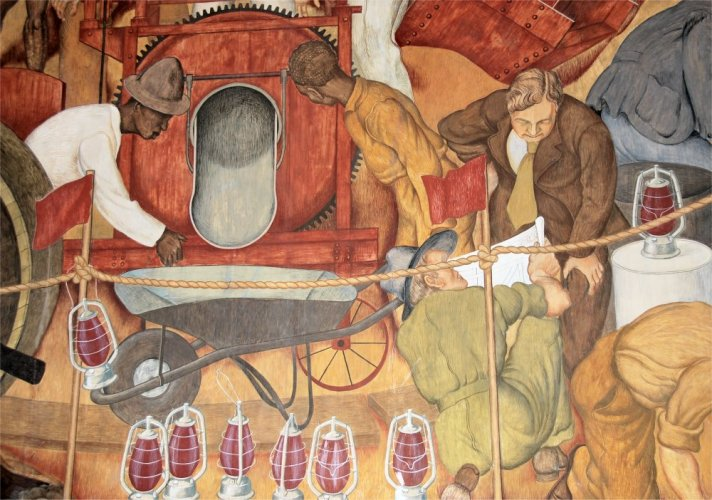
Mixing concrete, working with the plans

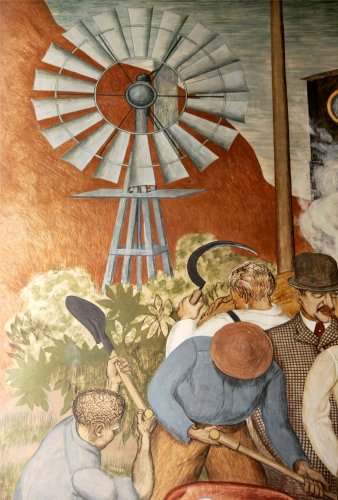
Wind-powered water pumps provide irrigation

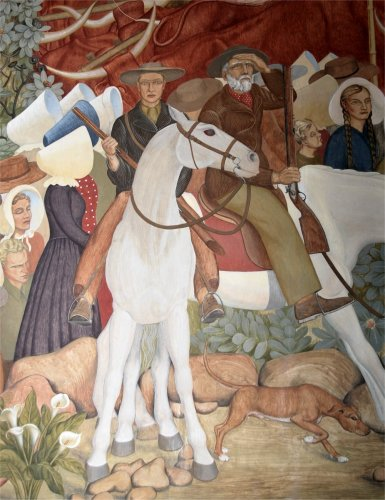
The Great Trek - ladies in their bonnets, men on horses

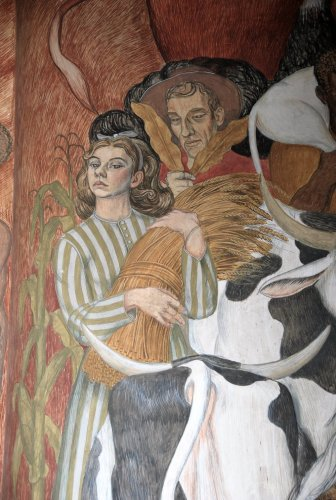
Farm produce at last - a smile on his face

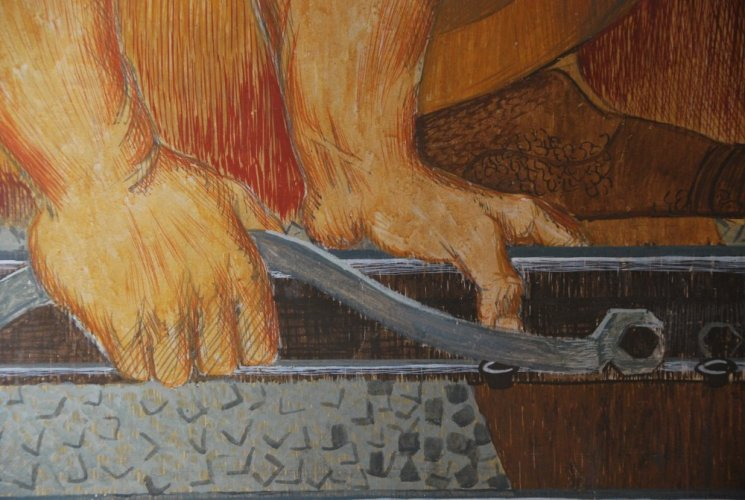
A detail - laying railway track

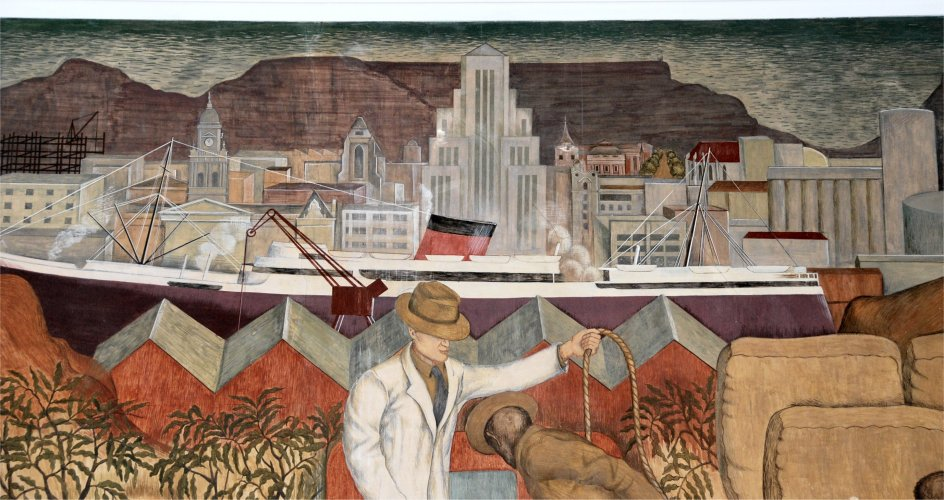
The image of the Mutual Building under Table Mountain

In 2016 the Assembly room was purchased for private use, and with the adjoining sections of the building it is being re-finished as private accommodation.

=== The Directors' Rooms ===
On the fourth level, at the front of the building, is the Directors' Board Room. As well as the board room there are two side rooms, one of which was a sitting room for Directors.

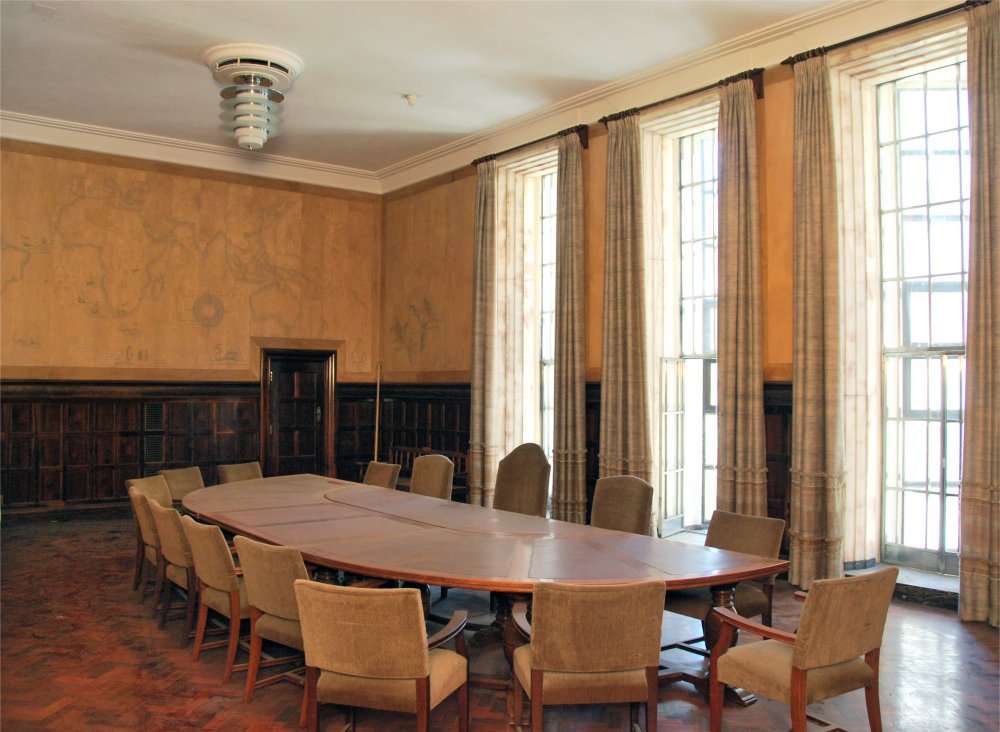
The Directors' Board Room

In the board room there is a continuous carved stinkwood frieze above the dado rail that incorporates animal and floral motifs (14 different species of birds and animals are represented). Ivan Mitford-Barberton is credited with this carving and it is probably the last work that he did in the building. Above the carved frieze is a mural designed and executed by Joyce Ord-Brown using stain on pale sycamore panelling. It represents Cape Town as the "Tavern of the Seas" in a light hearted way. The curtains are notable, being hand woven in a workshop in Eswatini (also known as Swaziland), by Coral Stephens Handweaving, a company established in the 1940s.

The selections below show some portions of the mural and the frieze, followed by some other details of the directors' rooms. The sea plane (second picture) is probably a Martin M-130, which is not recorded as having serviced South Africa (it worked the pacific routes). This is probably "artistic licence" on the part of Ord-Browne.

Portions of the Joyce Ord-Browne decorations

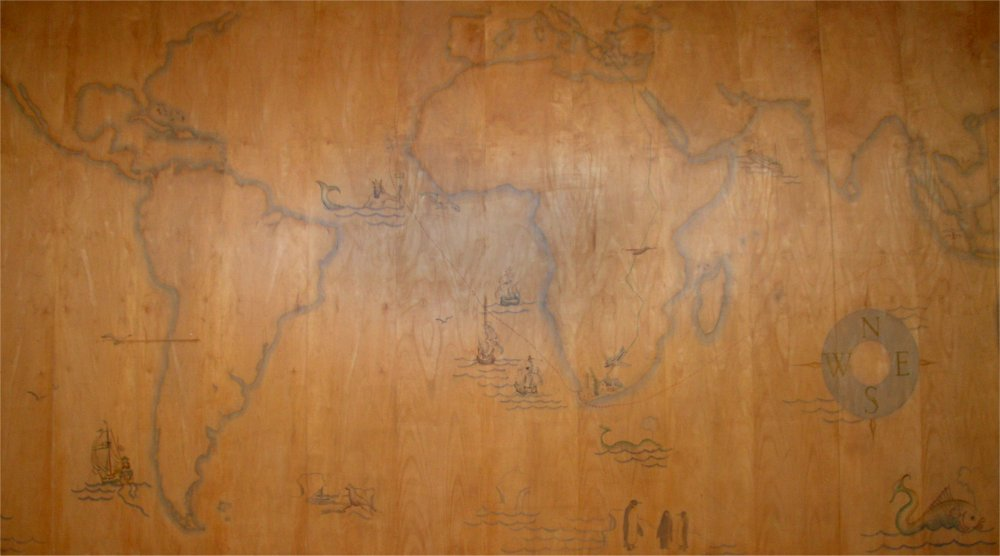
The Southern hemisphere, with route from Cape Town to London

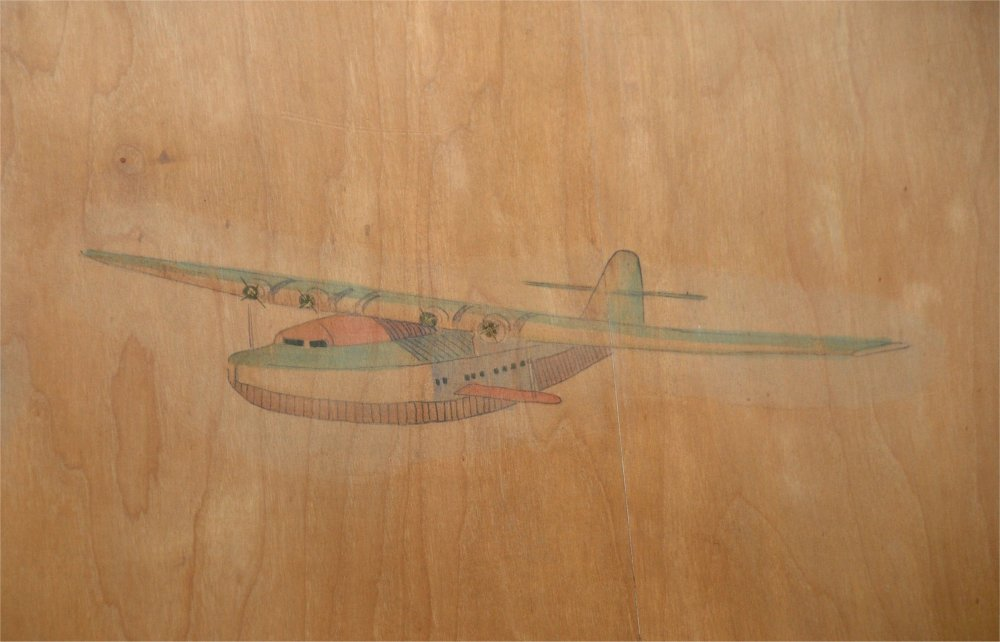
A sea plane

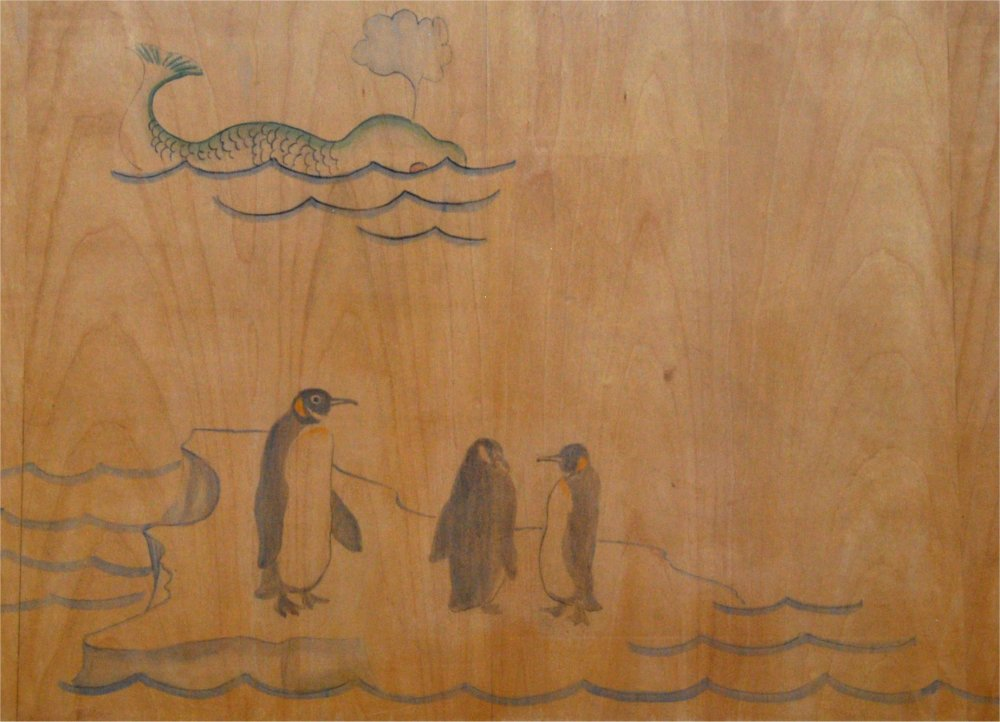
Penguins and whales

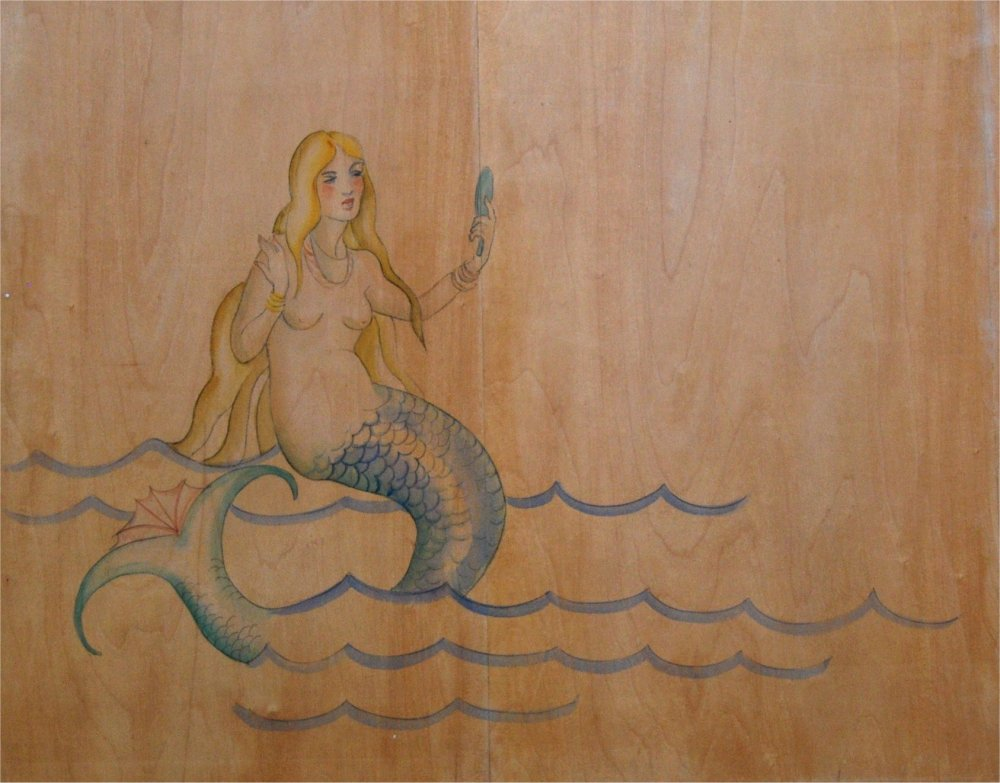
A mermaid

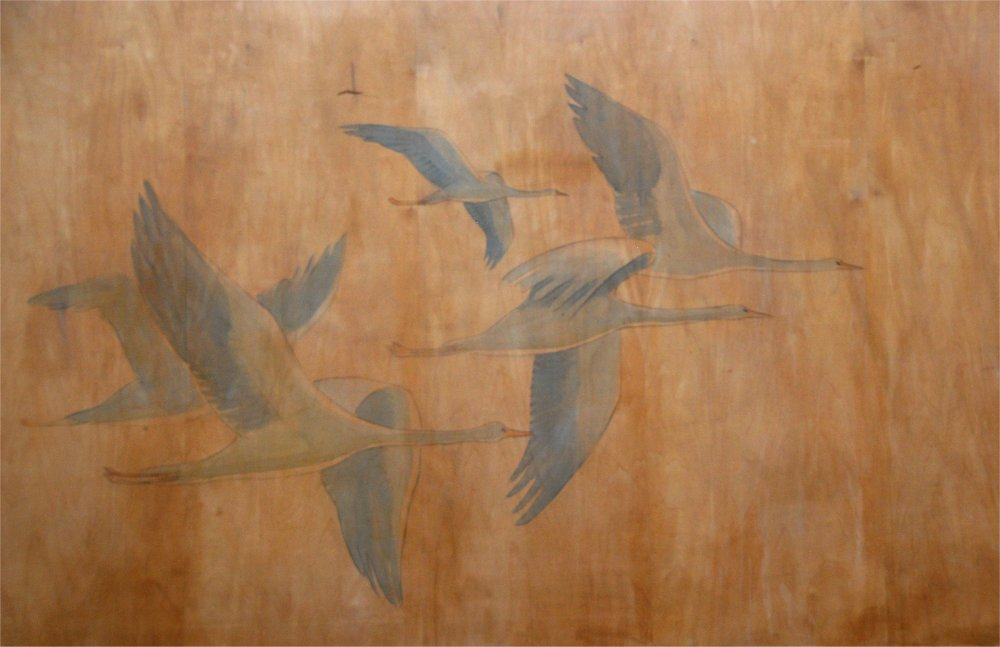
Blue cranes flying

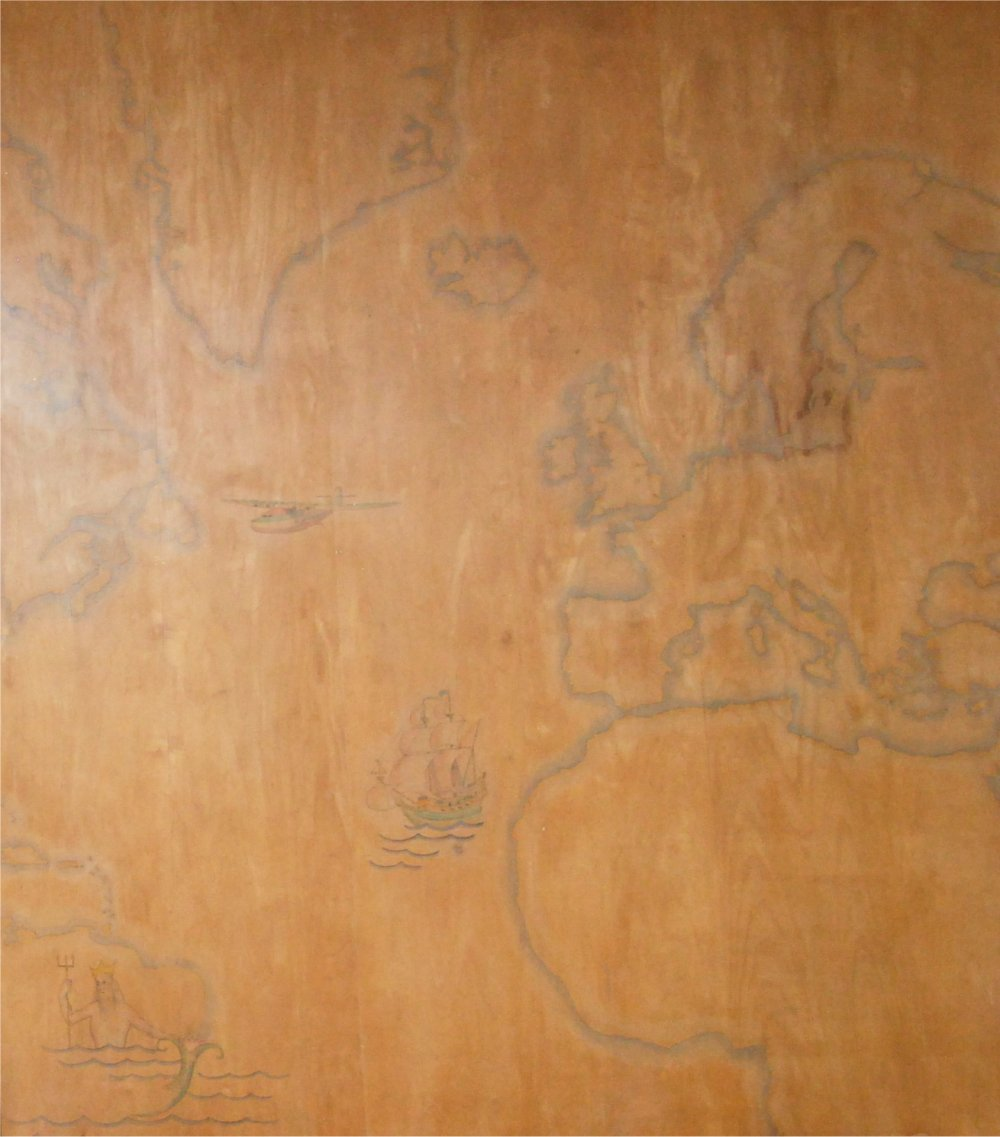
A portion of the Northern hemisphere, with King Neptune
Portions of the Mitford-Barberton stinkwood frieze

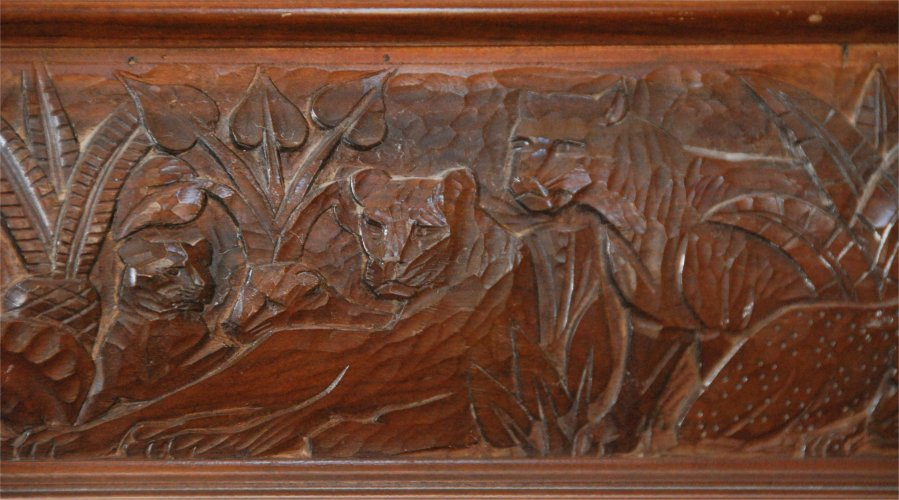

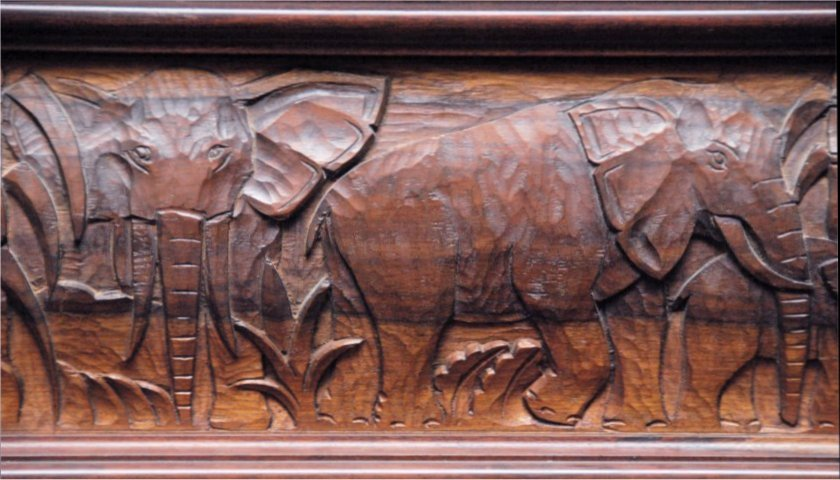

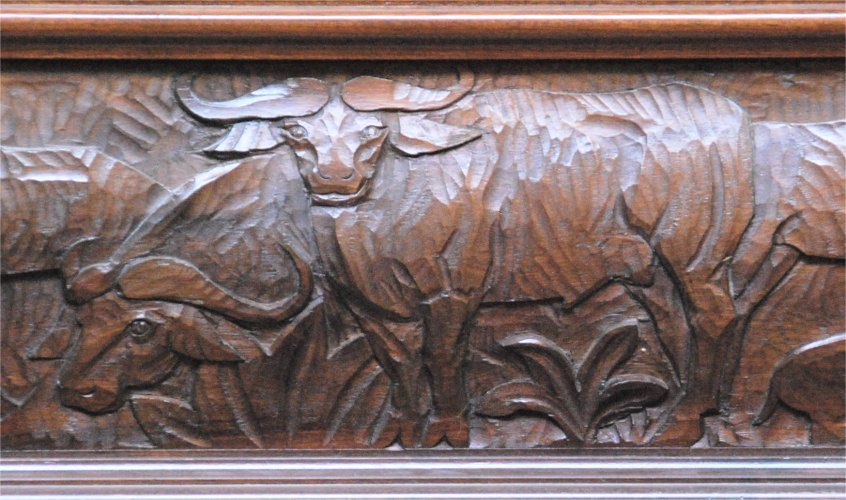

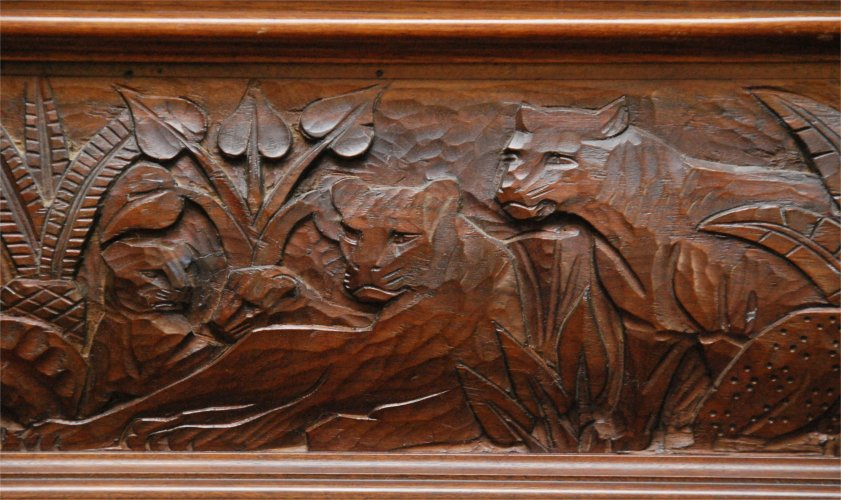

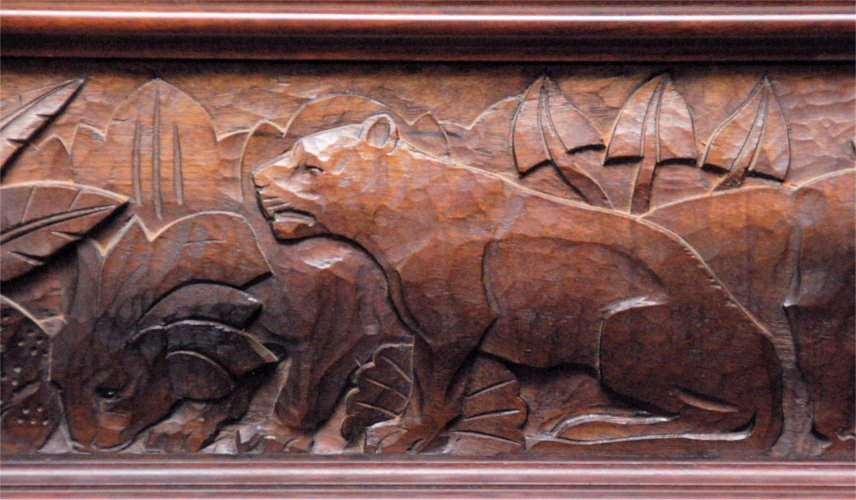
Some features of the directors' board room and sitting room

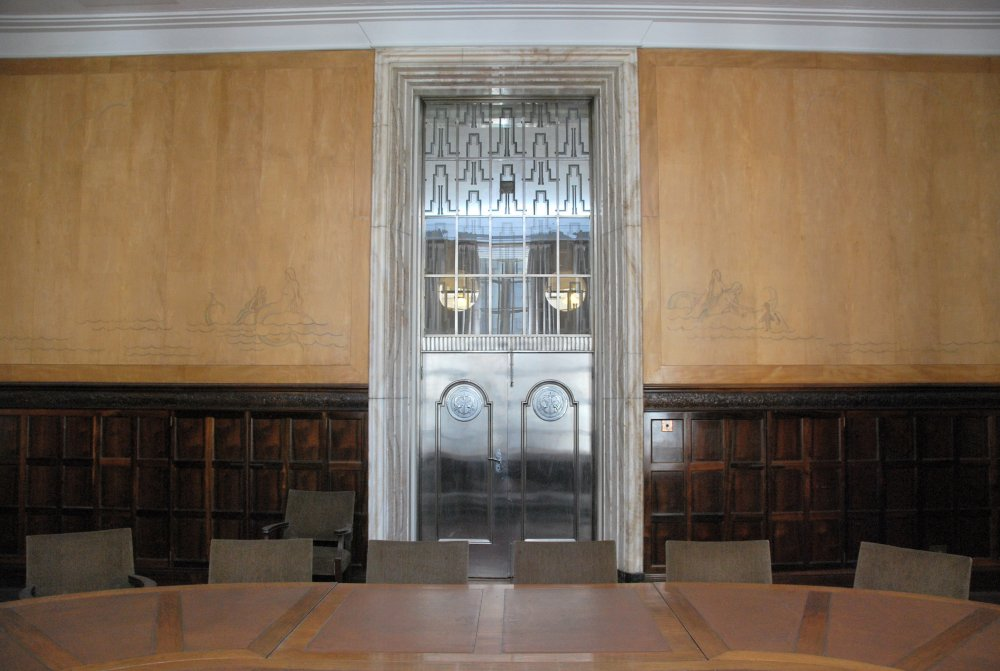
Entrance to the board room (see note below)

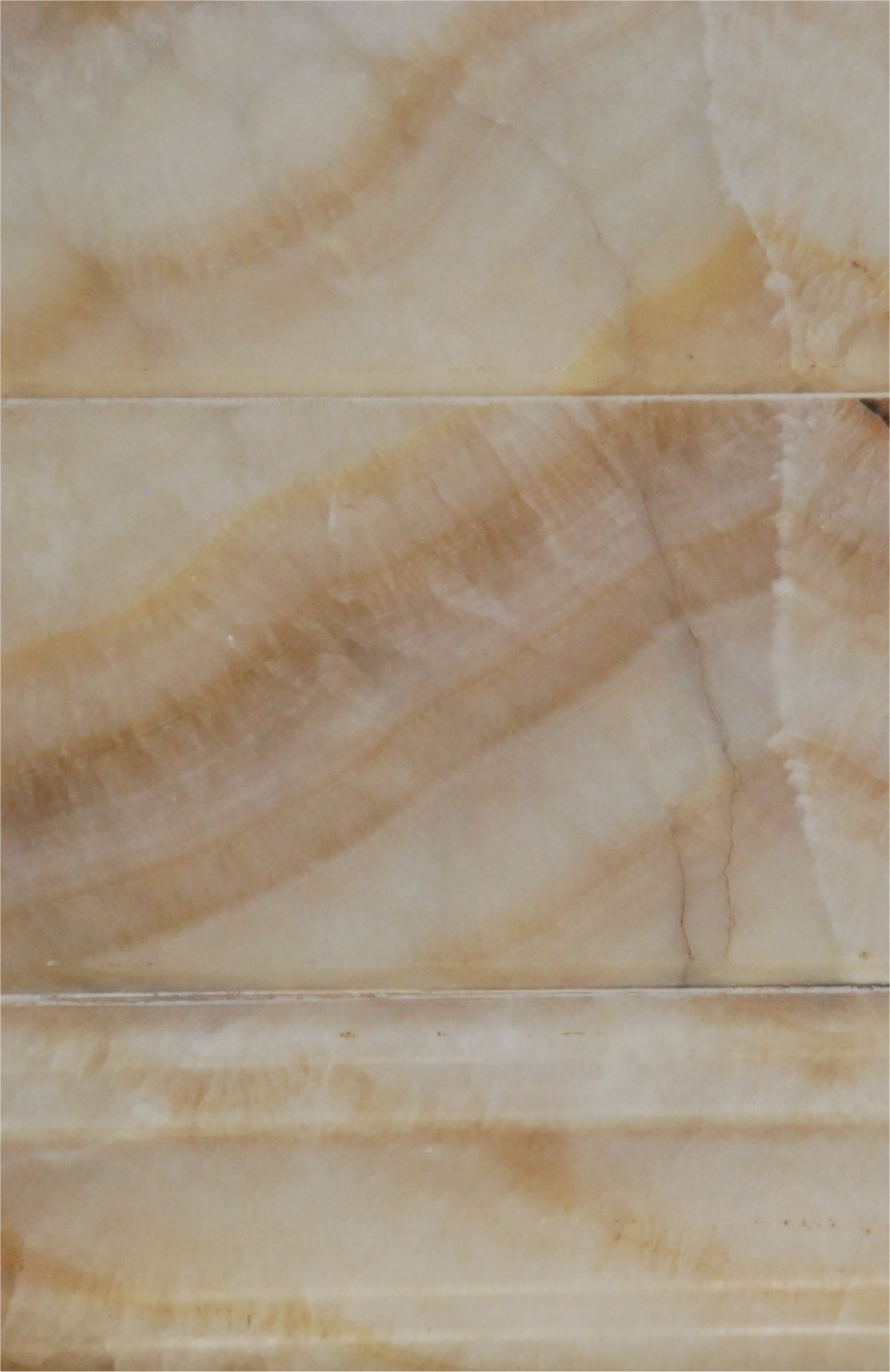
Marble at the door to the board room

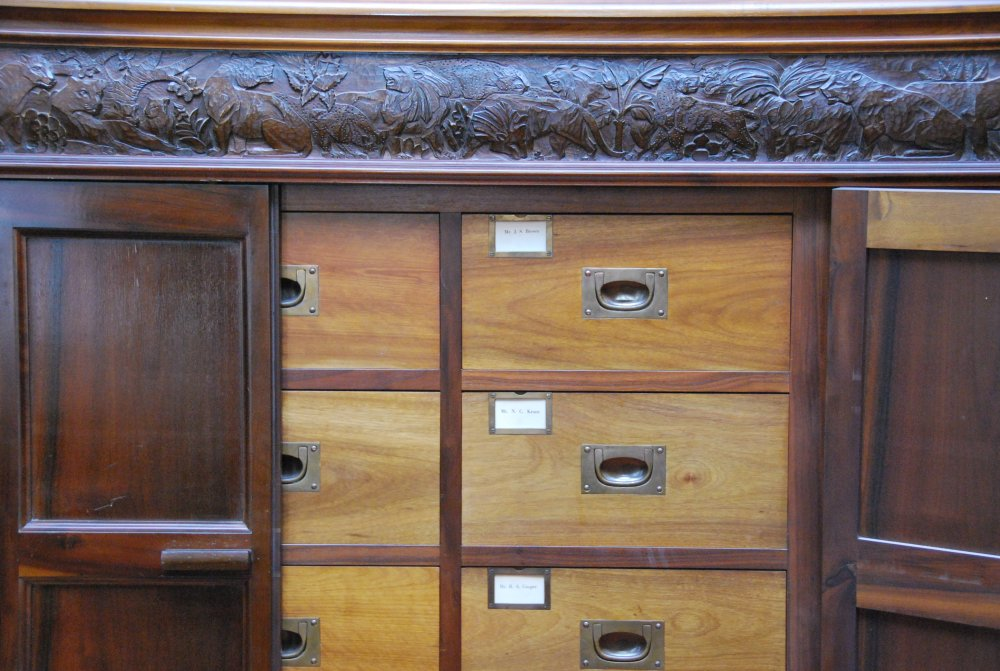
Directors had their own storage drawers in the board room

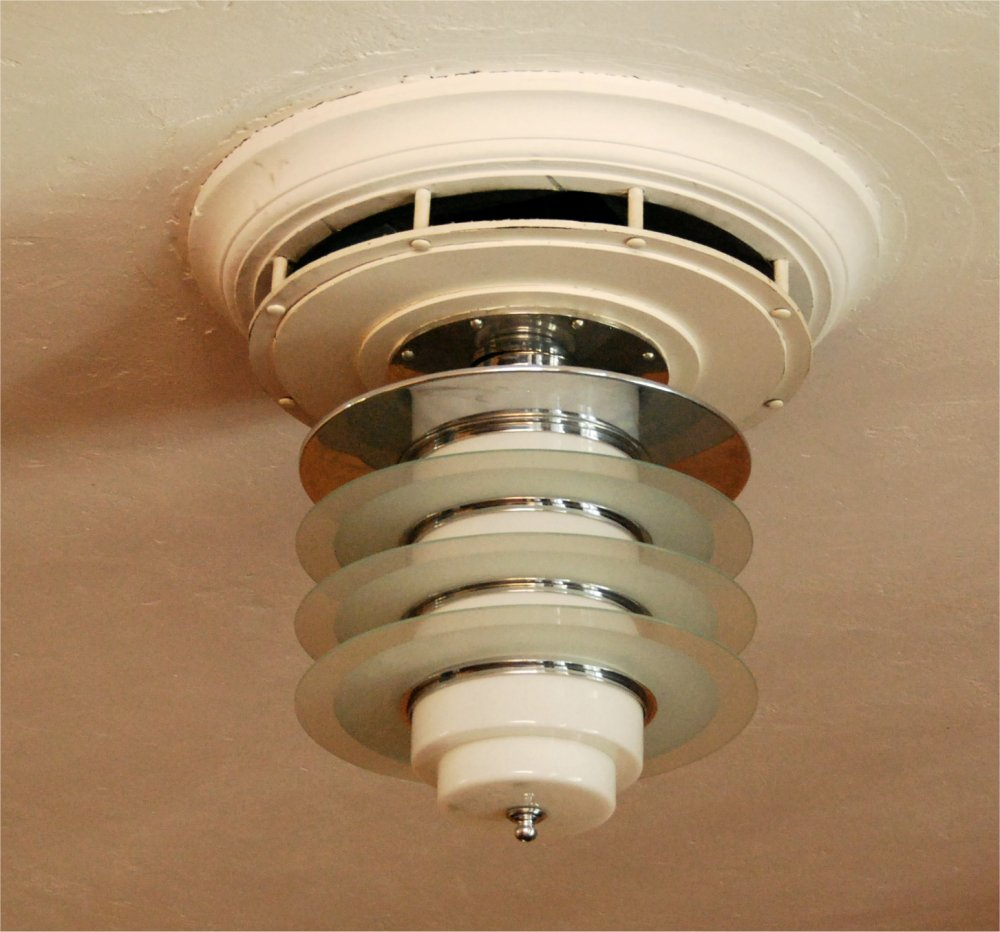
An original light fitting in the board room that (seemingly) doubles as a ventilation device

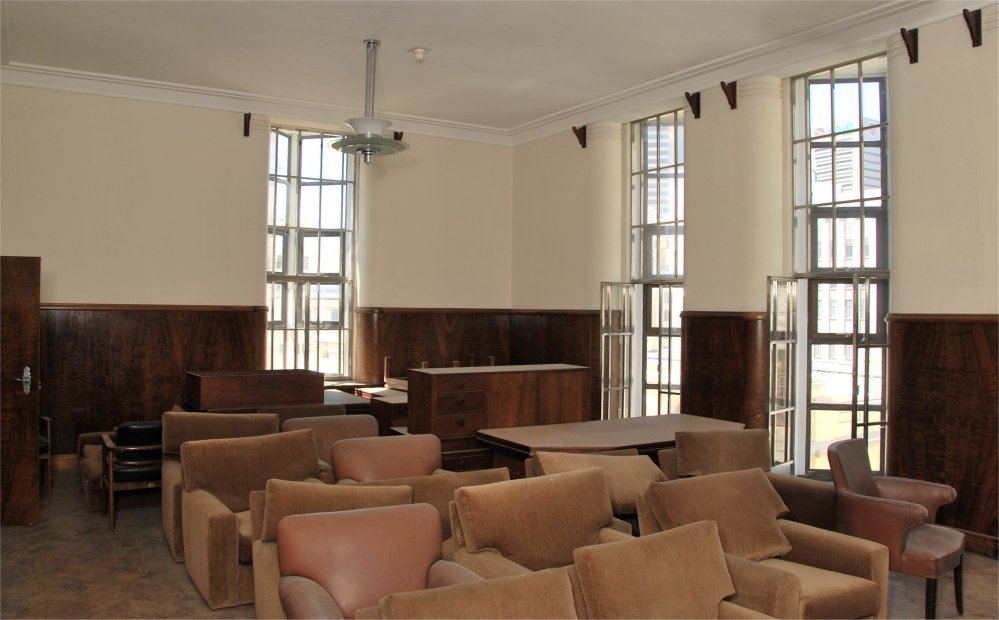
Easy chairs in the sitting room - unused in a long time

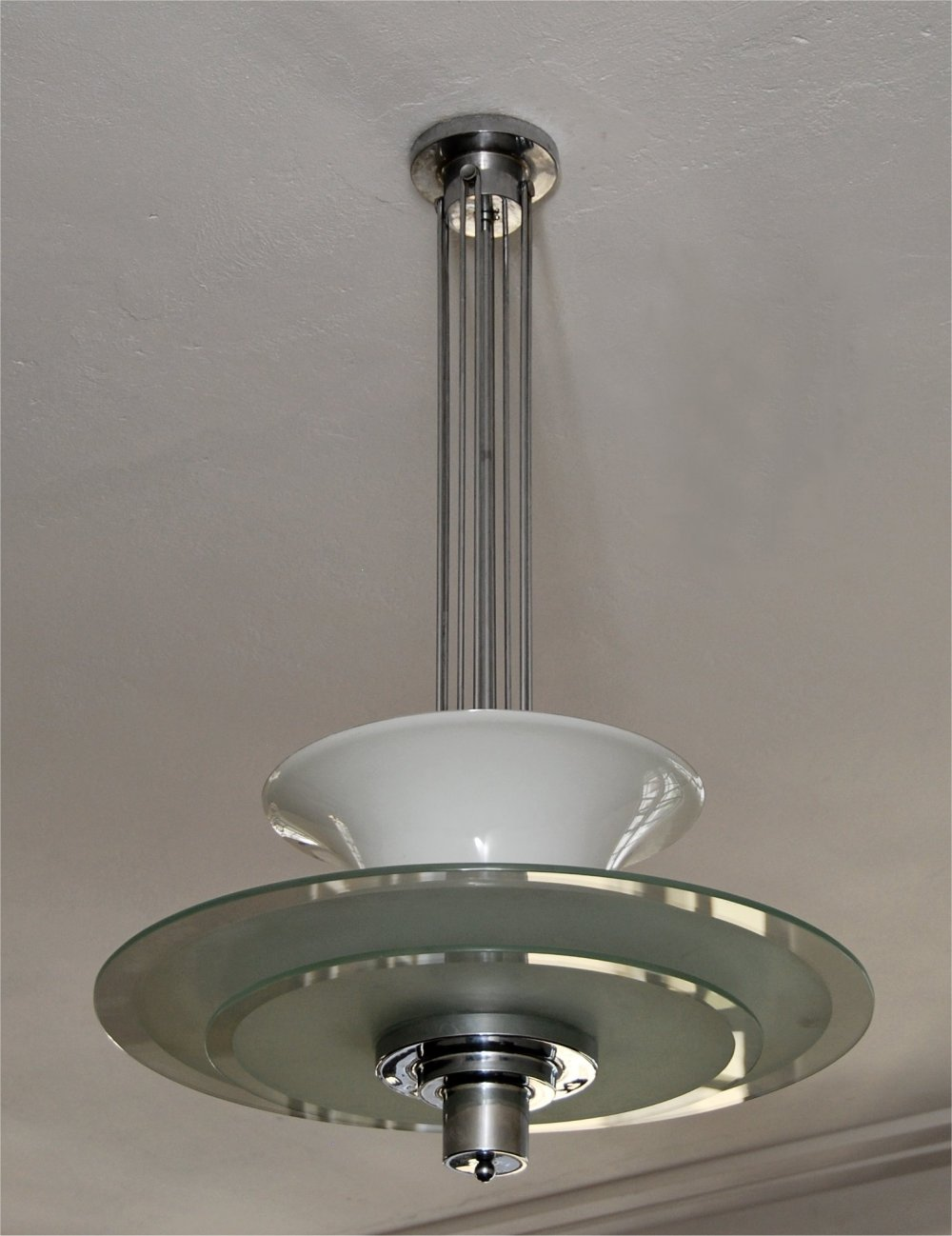
Another original light fitting in the sitting room

It is of note that the etched ziggurat icon on the glass over the entrance to the board room (see the enlarged version of the first image above) is not the same as that which is used elsewhere.

The Directors' suite has great heritage value but in 2015 it was re-finished and it is now used as offices for a heritage-related project management business.

=== The atrium ===
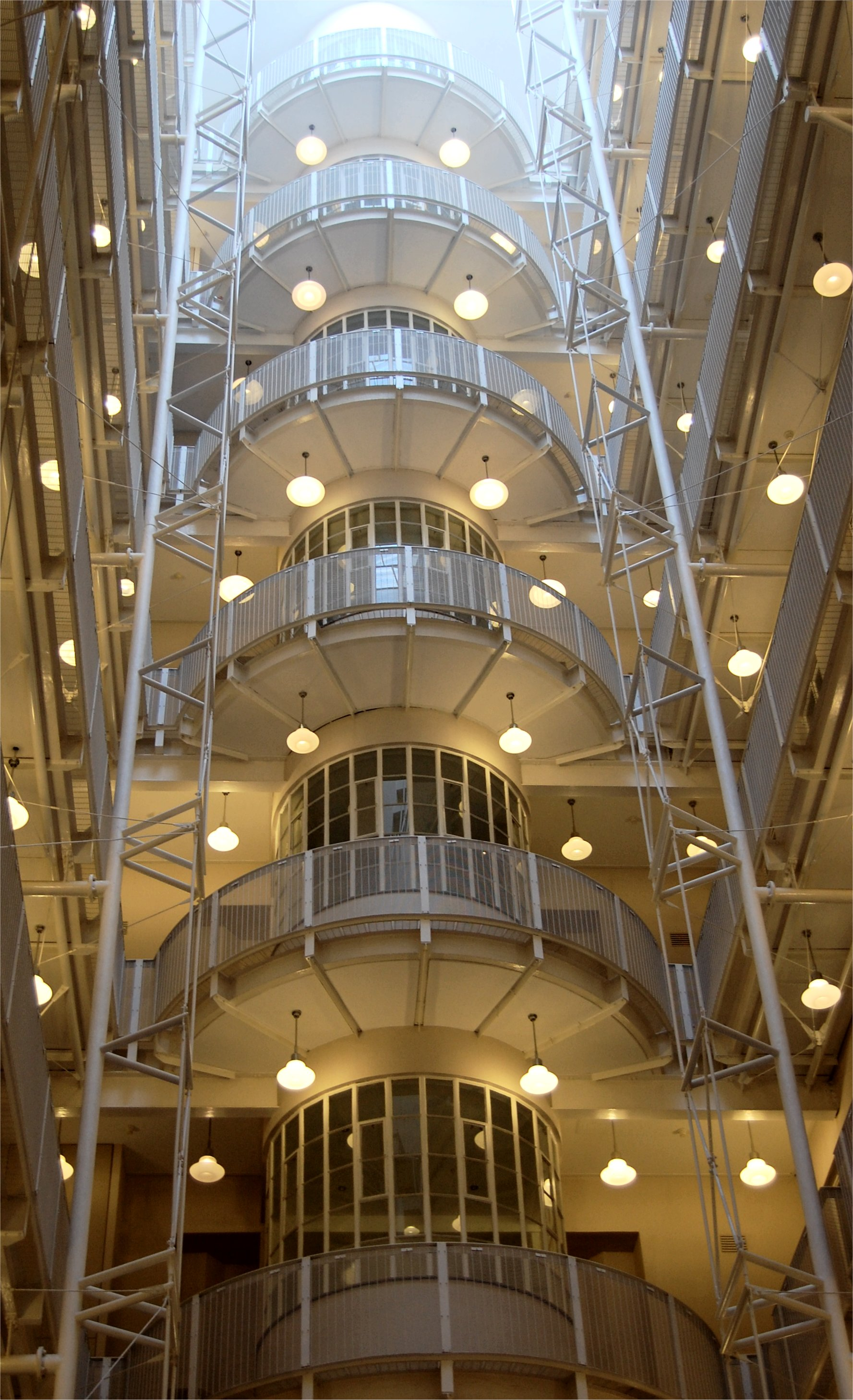
On entering the residential area of the building, one is struck by this extraordinary "top to bottom" atrium

The atrium extends from the roof of the banking hall to the very top of the main building. It was originally open to the weather, but it is now protected by a translucent roof, through which the tower can be seen extending even higher.

The circular windows visible here are incorporated into the apartments that now occupy the front of the building.

=== The windows ===
The rising nature of the ziggurat mass of the exterior of the building is reinforced by the prismoid (triangular) windows, which extend up and down the height of the building. These windows are of note because they set the Mutual Building apart from some of the buildings that inspired it, for example the Eastern Columbia Building in Los Angeles. They are also functional, because they allow light to enter the building more effectively than would otherwise be the case (using the reflective properties of the inside face of the glass), and by opening and closing blinds on the one side or the other it is possible on sunny days to manage the heat entering the building as the sun traverses the sky.

Water-cooled air conditioning was another innovative feature of the original building, that avoided the need for extensive natural ventilation and allowed more freedom for the design of the windows and granite spaces between; the same water-cooled air conditioning design is in use today.

As Freschi notes in his paper, the prismoid windows make for much more visual interest than the conventional windows in the General Post Office building. Here the image juxtaposes the Mutual building (foreground) with the General Post Office built the following year (behind).

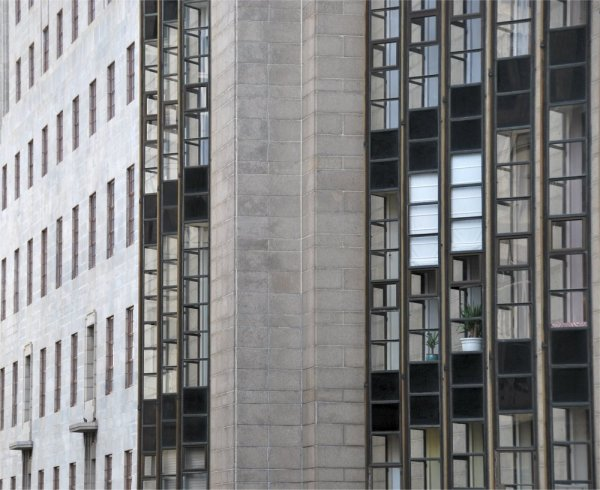
The windows compared

=== Granite cladding ===
The granite cladding of the building was hewn from a single boulder on the Paarl Mountain, north east of the city of Cape Town. The cladding incorporates decorative baboon, elephant and tribal heads that project from the upper facades of the Darling Street elevation (the front of the building).

The granite decorations

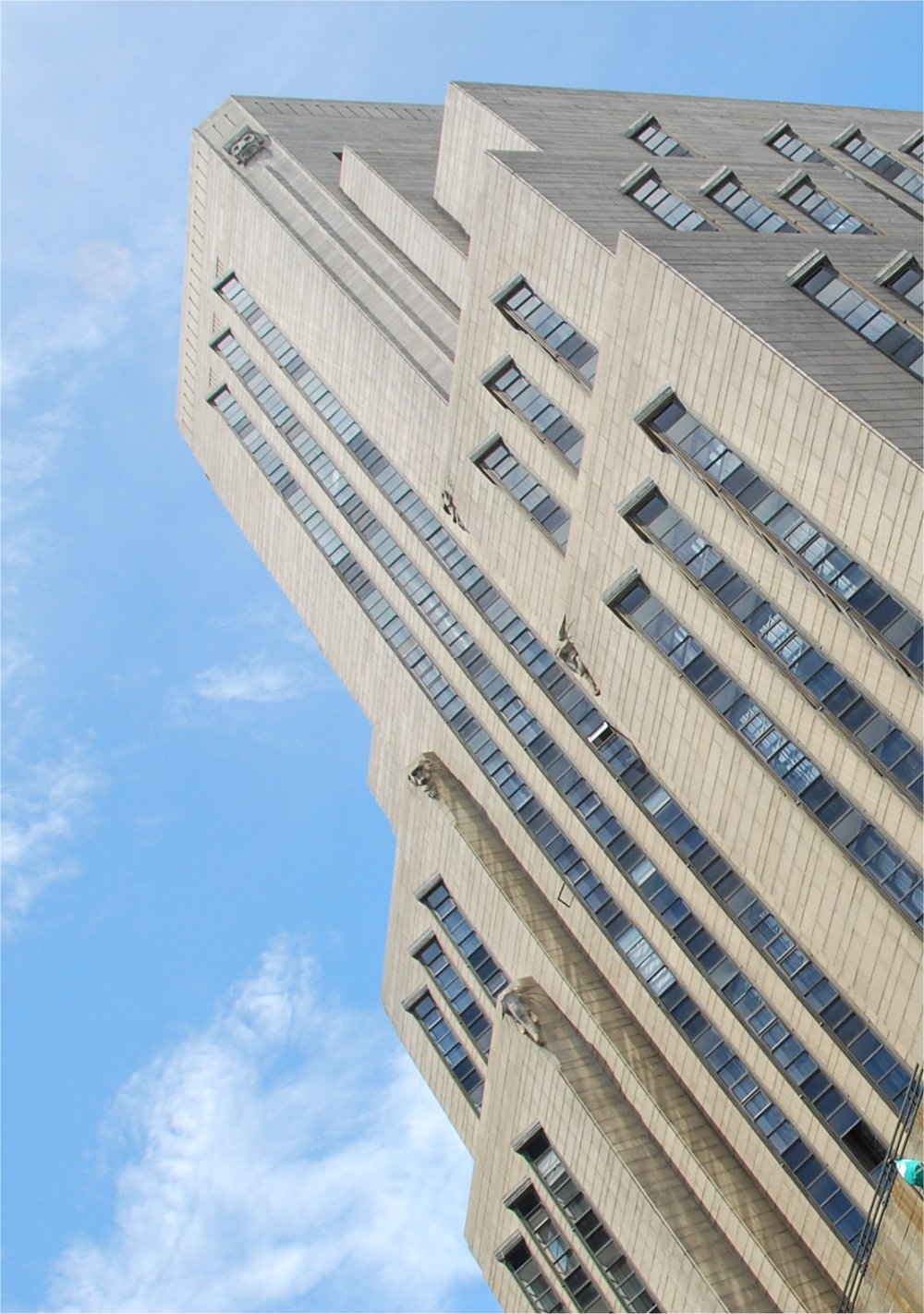
The decorations

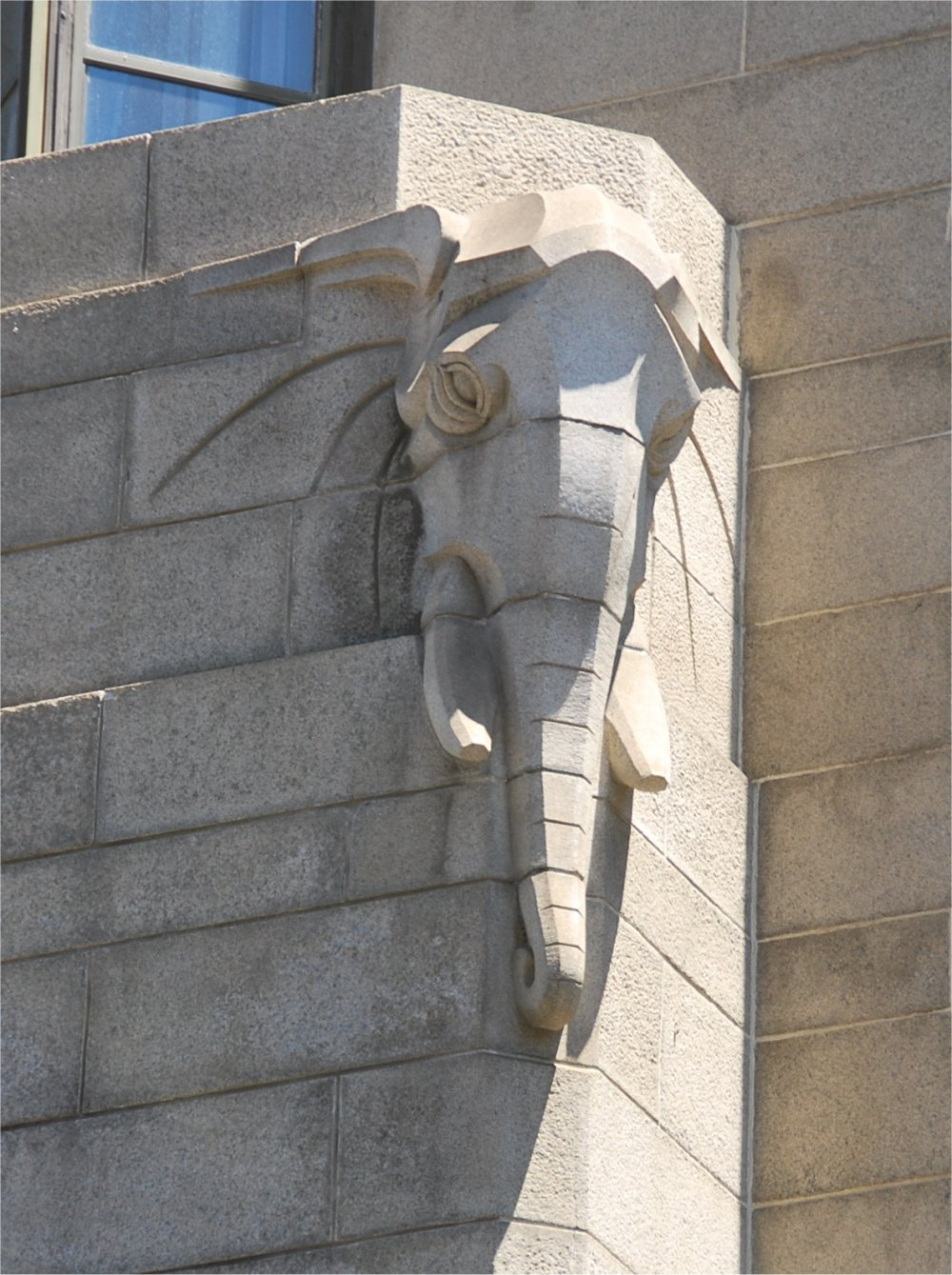
Elephant (6th level)

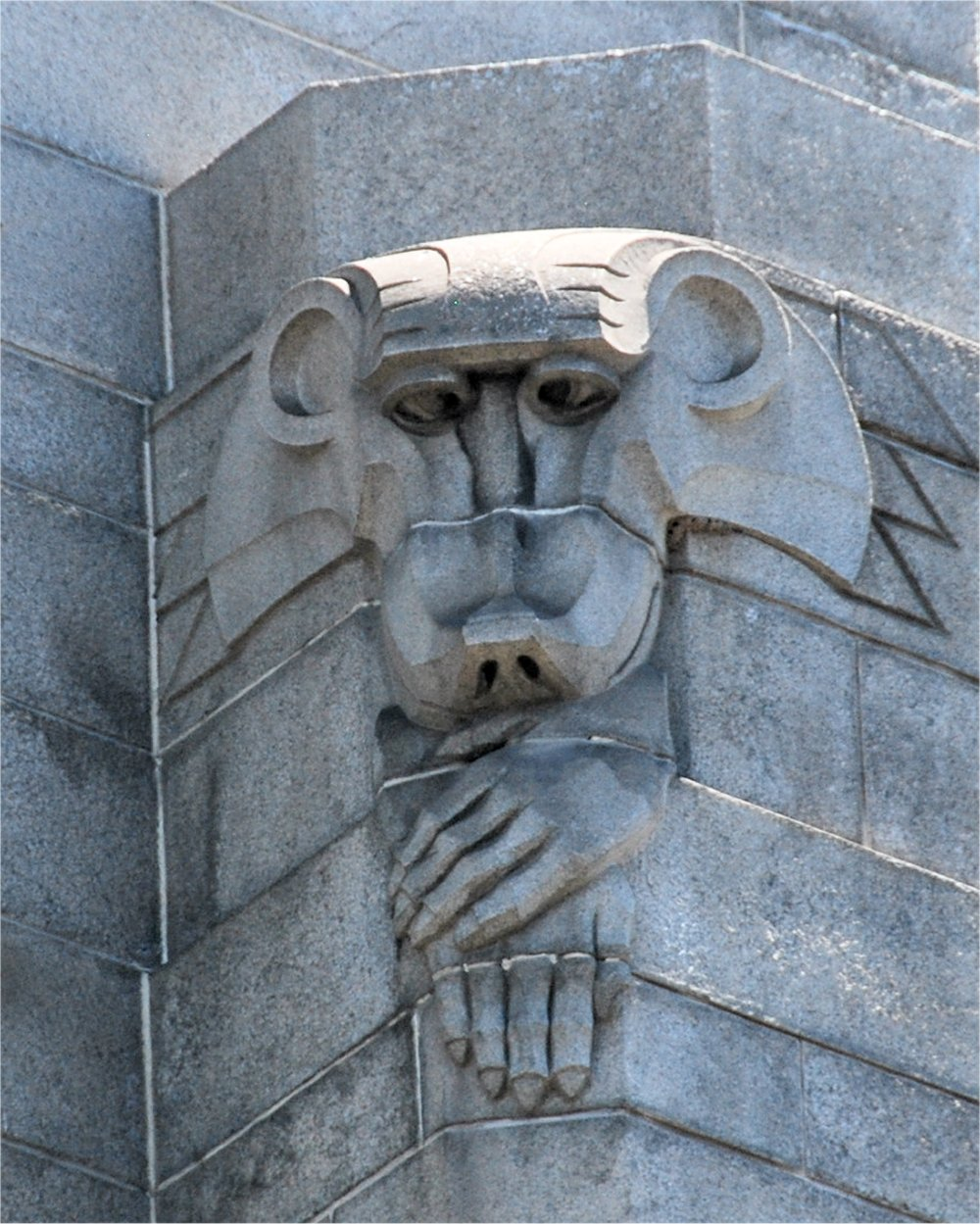
Baboon (8th level)

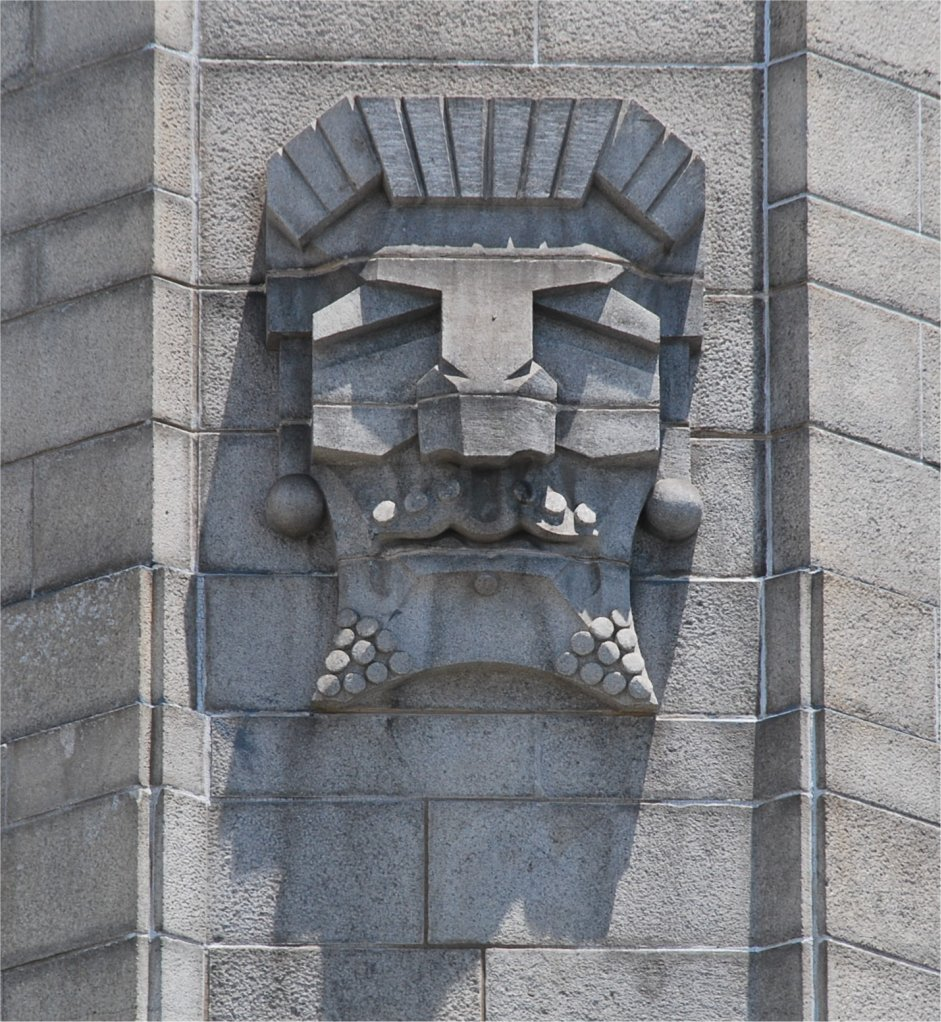
Tribal head (tower)

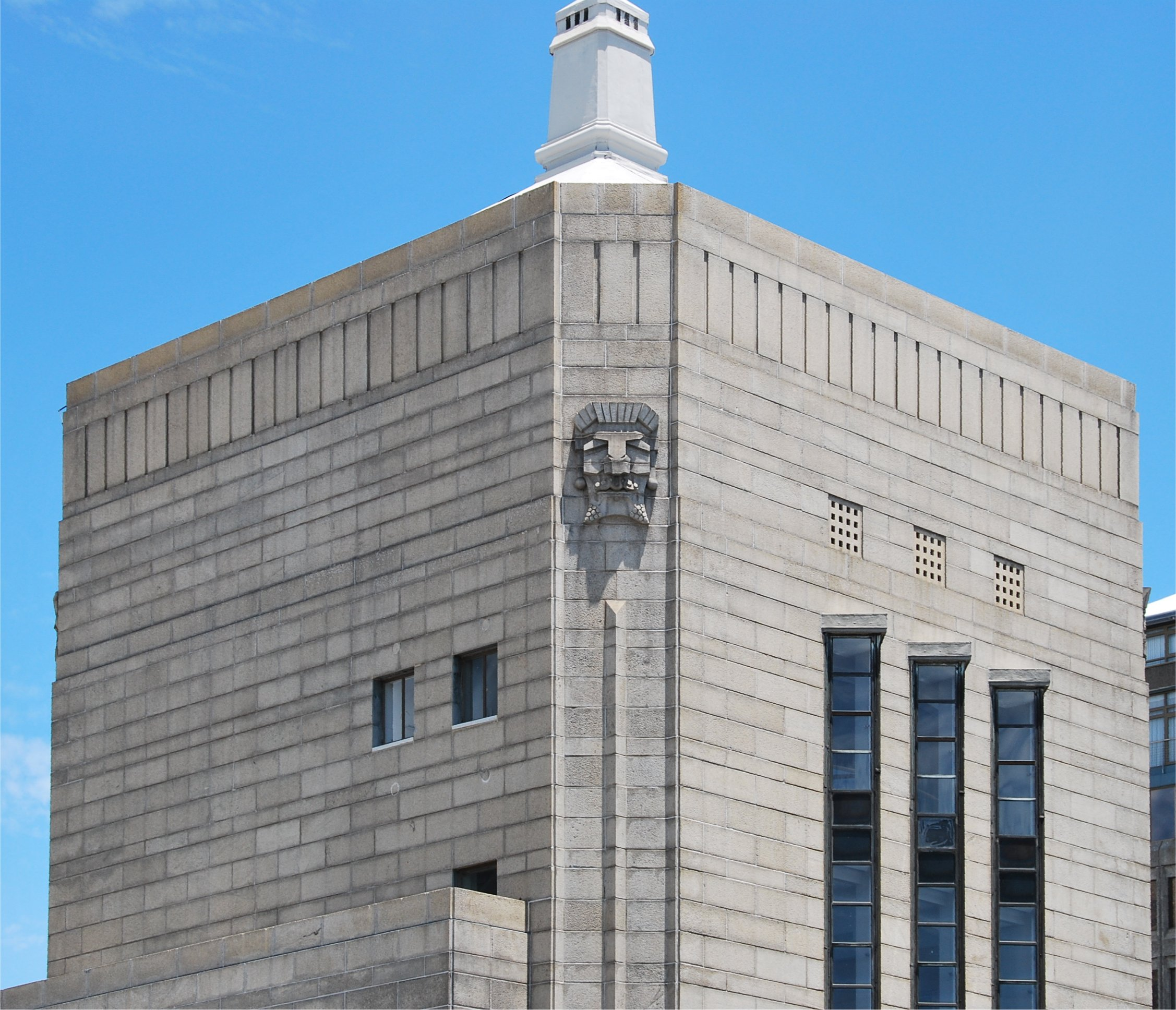
Tower with tribal head

=== The Tribal Figures ===
On the Parliament Street facade there are carved granite figures representing nine ethnic African groups (not just South African) labelled thus: "Xosa", "Pedi", "Maasai", "Matabele", "Basuto", "Barotse", "Kikuyu", "Zulu", and "Bushman". Note that the identification of the tribes does not necessarily follow current practice.

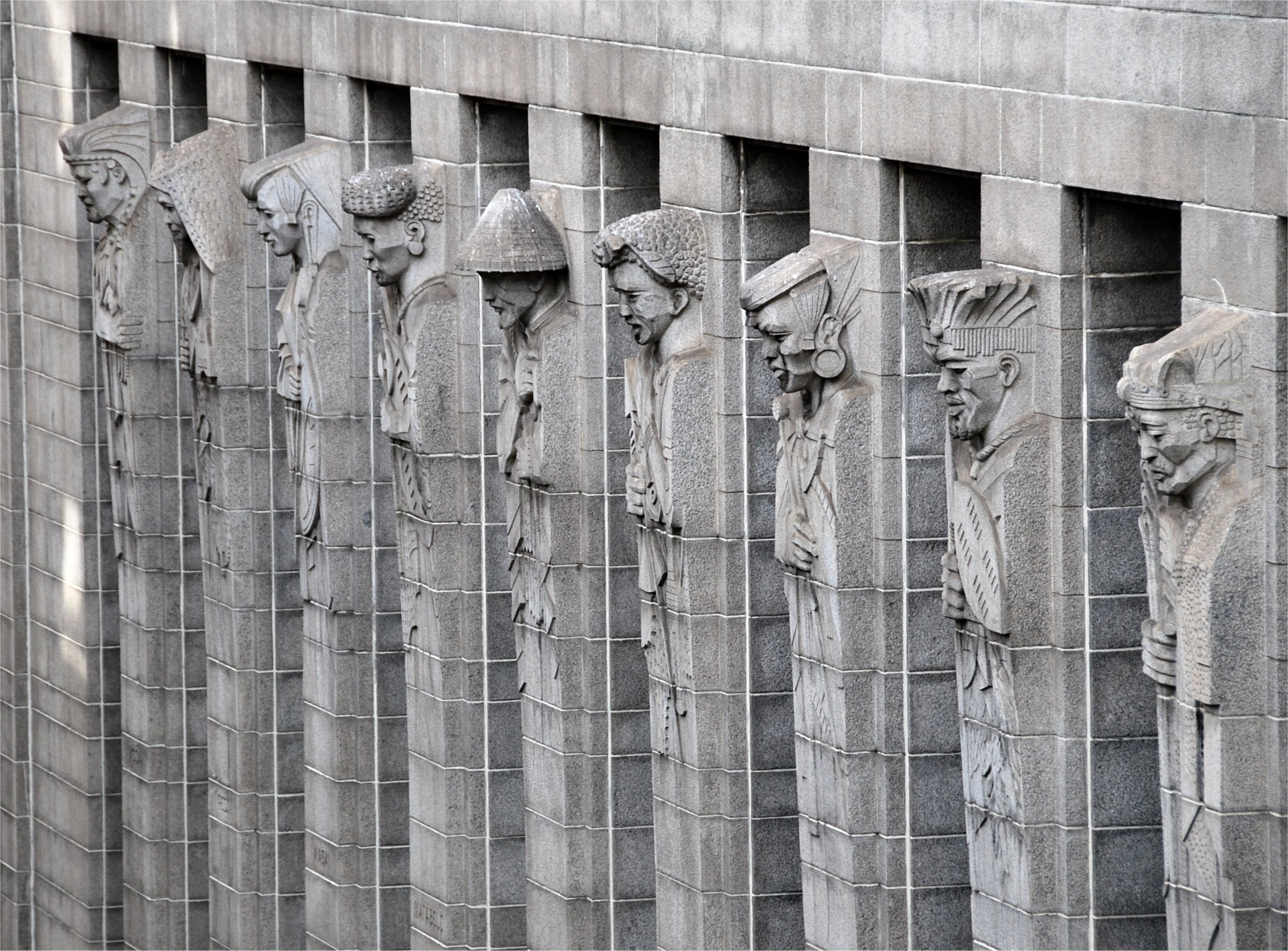
The nine tribal figures looking over Parliament Street.

The individual figures in detail (remember you can click on the images to see the full-size version):

The individual tribal figures

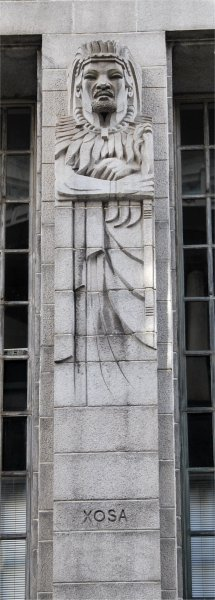
"Xosa"

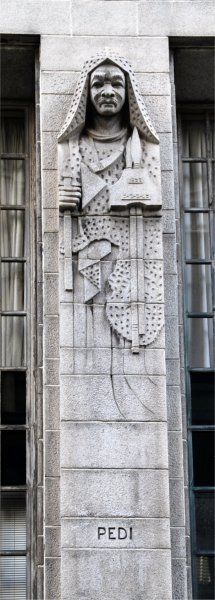
"Pedi"

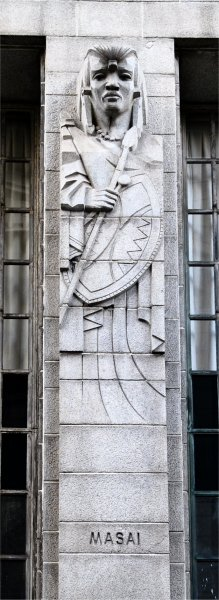
"Masai"

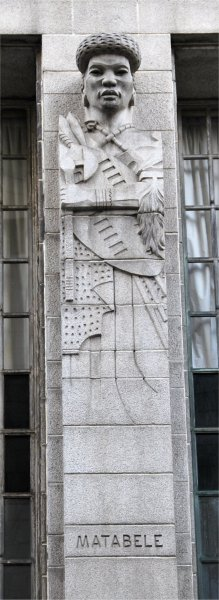
"Matabele"

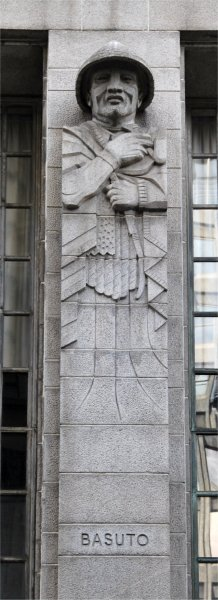
"Basuto"

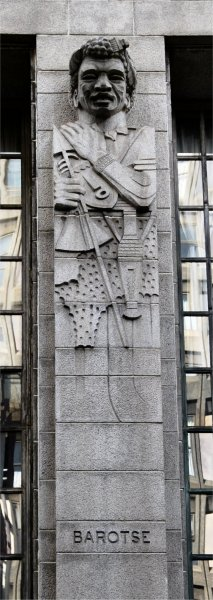
"Barotse"

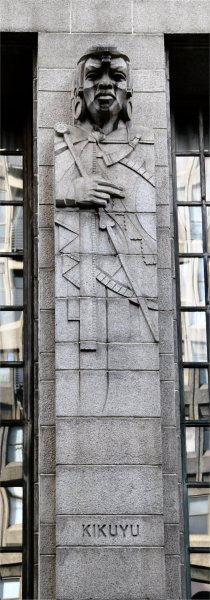
"Kikuyu"

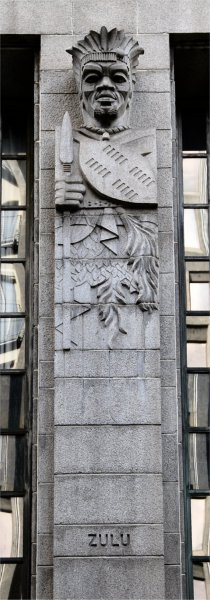
"Zulu"

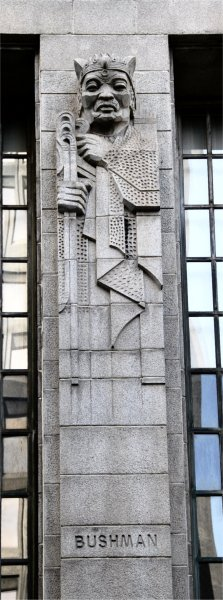
"Bushman"

Recently Sanford S. Shaman has written a critique of these figures, and other features of the building partly based on interviews with pedestrians walking around the building.

=== The frieze ===
Around the three sides of the building facing Darling Street, Parliament Street and Longmarket Street there is a 386 feet (118 metre) frieze depicting scenes from the colonial history of South Africa, reported at its completion to be the longest such frieze in the world.

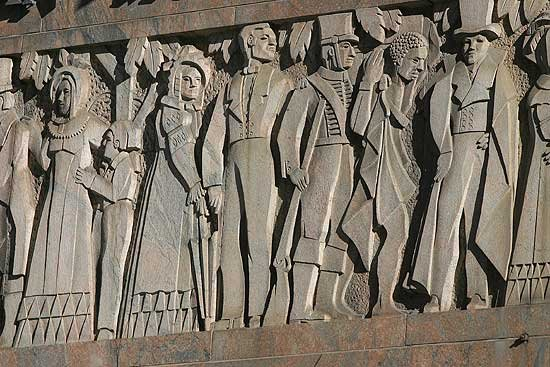
A portion of the 386 feet frieze that traverses three sides of the building, showing the 1820 settlers landing

It is of interest that, at the time, it was proclaimed that the building was built by South Africans, using South African materials; while the frieze was itself designed by South African, Ivan Mitford-Barberton (born in Somerset East, Eastern Cape, in 1896), the work was executed by a team of Italian immigrants led by Adolfo Lorenzi. It has recently come to light that, in the course of the work, Lorenzi's team of masons were incarcerated when the Second World War broke out in 1939, being Italian and therefore regarded as "the enemy" at that time. They were obliged to finish their work under an armed guard.

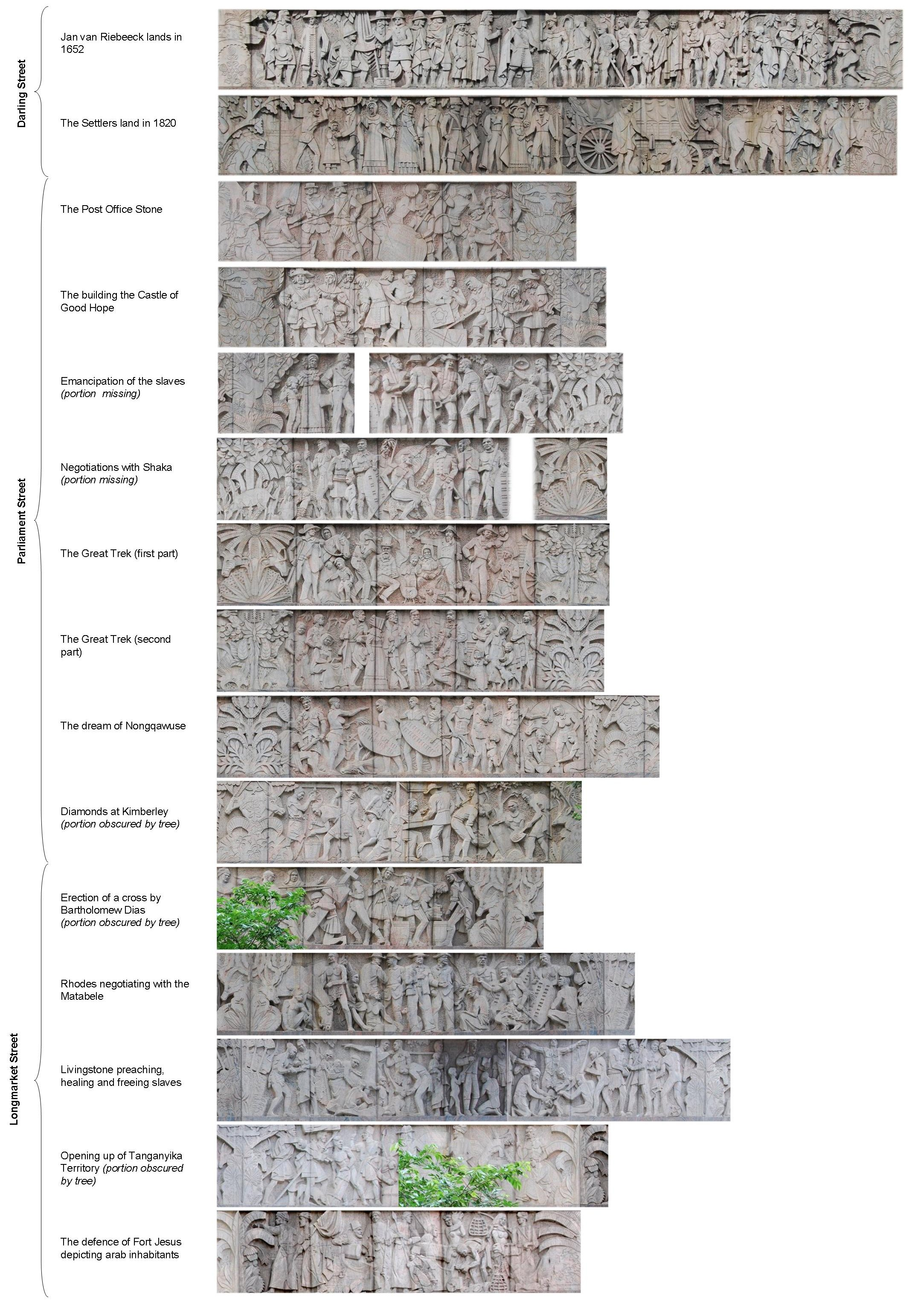
A composite showing almost all of the frieze in its 15 sections – some portions are missing in this version – click to see a readable version and then choose the "Full resolution" option under the image (but be patient, this is a large file – 1Mb)

A composite view of the frieze can be seen at the right; unfortunately in this version some portions are missing or obscured by trees in leaf.

The sections of the frieze are as follows:

- The landing of Jan van Riebeeck
- The arrival of the 1820 Settlers
- The "Post Office Stone"
- The building of the Castle of Good Hope
- The emancipation of the slaves
- Negotiations with Chaka (also known as "King Shaka)"
- The Great Trek
- The dream of Nongqawuse (other spellings are sometimes used)
- Discovery of diamonds at Kimberley
- Erection of a cross by Bartholomew Dias
- Rhodes negotiating with the Matabele
- David Livingstone preaching, healing and freeing slaves
- The opening up of Tanganyika Territory
- The defence of Fort Jesus depicting Arab inhabitants

A second version of this collage of the complete frieze can be found elsewhere

== Views of (and from) the building ==
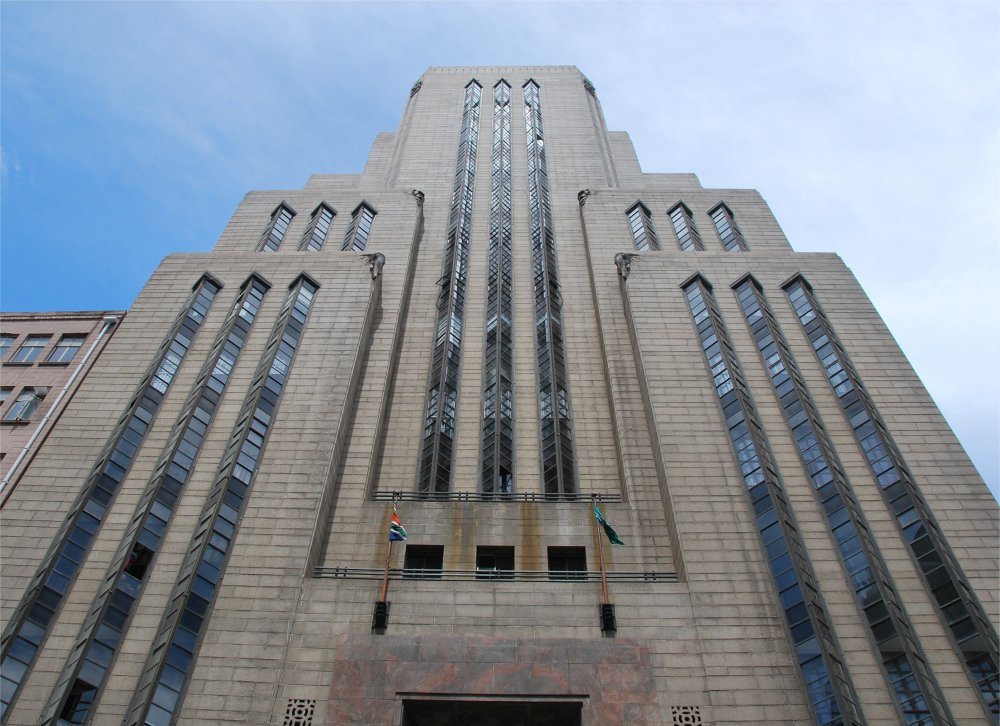
Seen from Darling Street

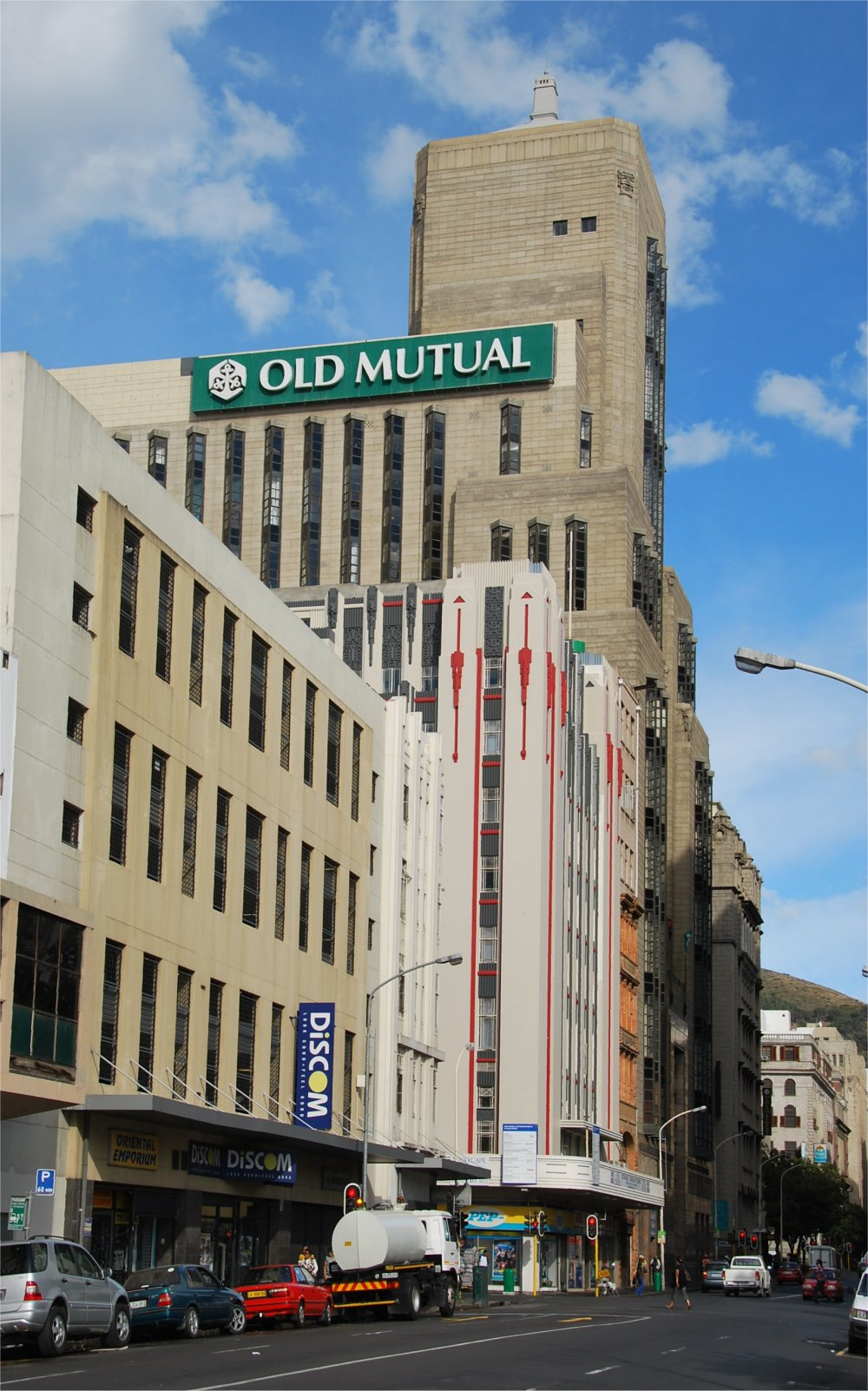
The busy city works around the building. The Mutual Building can claim that its restoration and conversion to residential use brought new life to the city centre, and started a five-year programme of re-invigoration and rapid improvement. The large green "Old Mutual" sign and logo were removed from the building in February 2012.

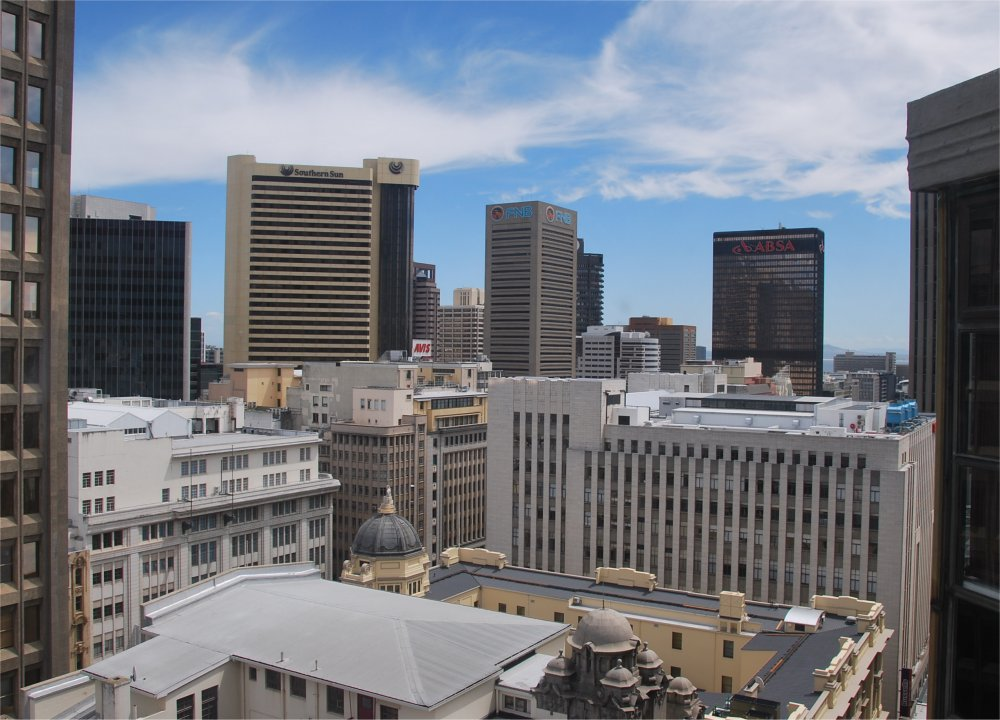
The skyline of the city of Cape Town has changed significantly since the Mutual Building was constructed. Even from its highest point of easy access, the Mutual Building View is now dwarfed by the more modern buildings in the Cape Town central business district.

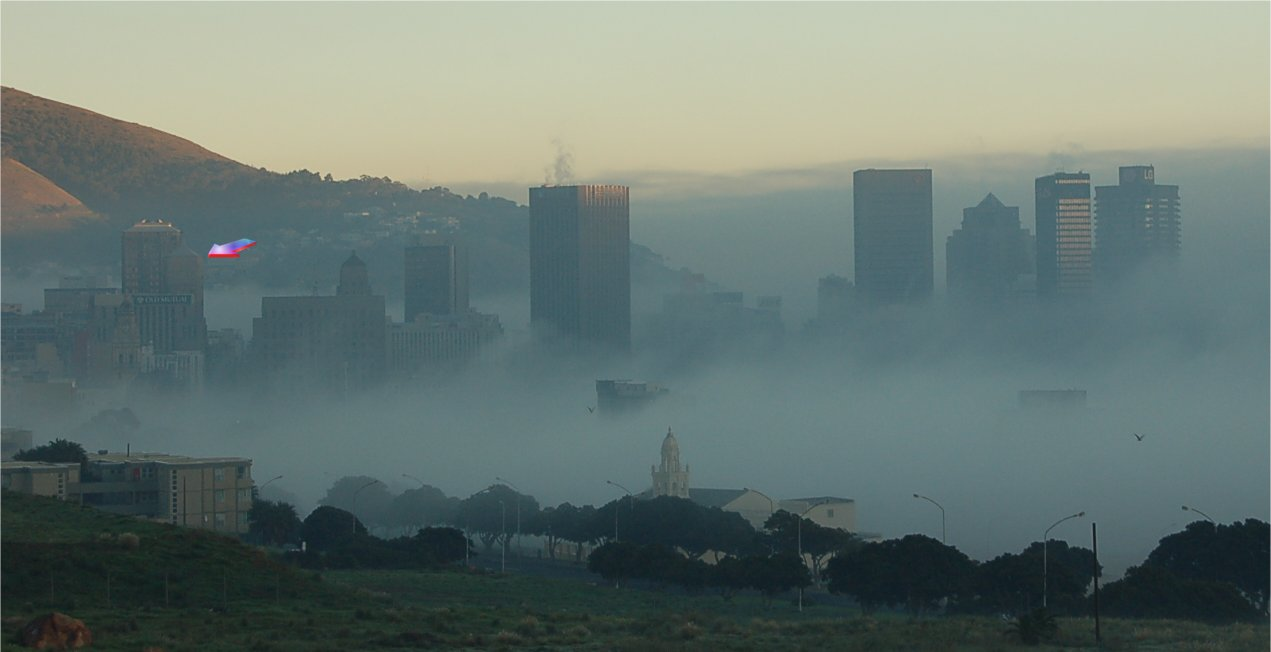
In the modern skyline the Mutual Building is lost in a maze of tall buildings. Here the sea mist swirls around the central business district and the small coloured arrow picks out the Mutual Building, at the left. This photograph is taken from District Six, on the slopes of Devil's peak to the east of Table Mountain. Click to see the full size version of this photograph, when the outline of the building can be more easily discerned.

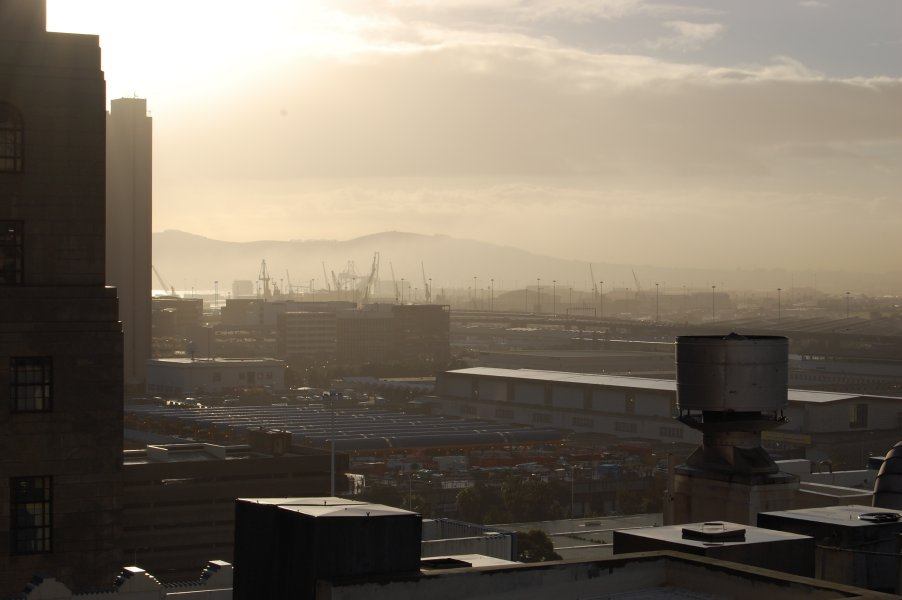
The view of the harbour from the middle levels of the Mutual Building in Darling Street in Cape Town, once uninterrupted, is now obscured by the General Post Office constructed shortly afterwards (seen here at the extreme left).

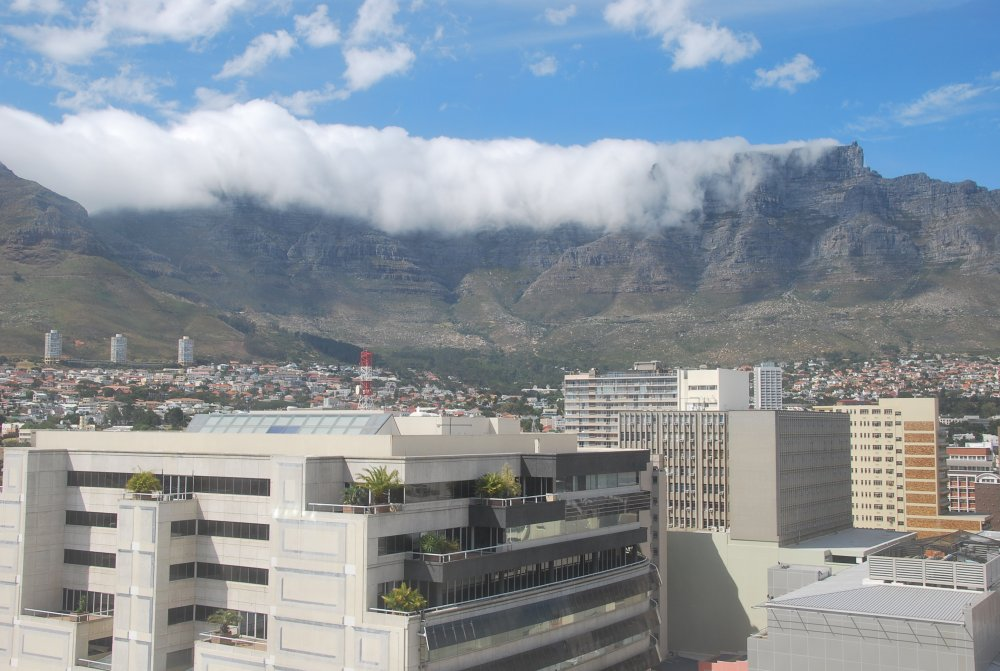
Table Mountain and its "table cloth" seen from the upper levels of the building.

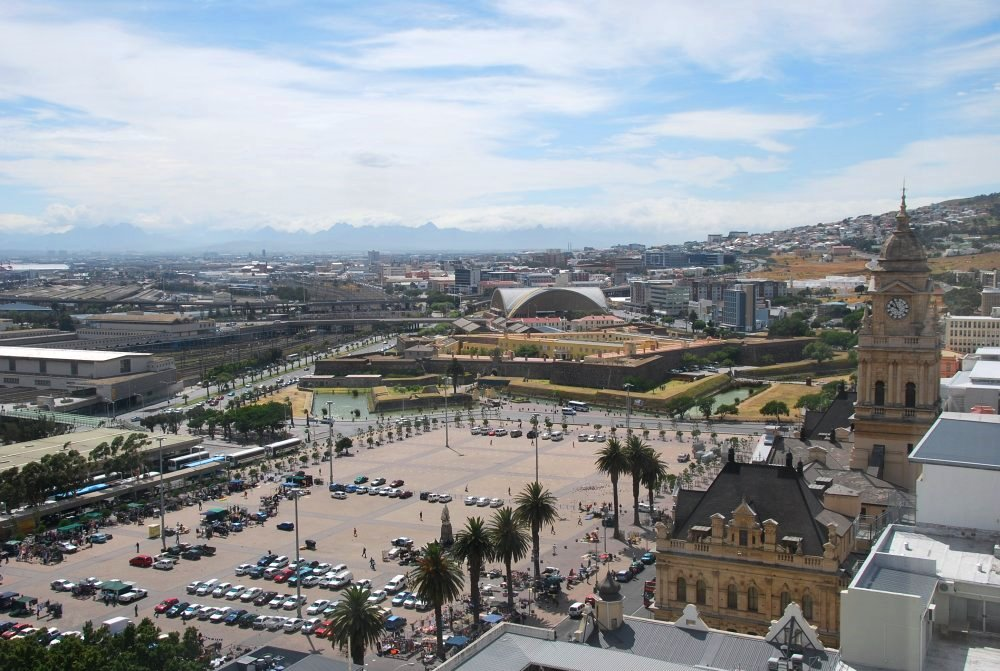
Looking in the other direction, the City Hall, the Grand Parade and the Castle can all be seen clearly. In the distance are the Hottentots Holland Mountains.
