= Liberty Life Assurance Kenya Limited =

Liberty Life
- Company type: Private
- Industry: Life insurance, financial services
- Founded: 1964
- Headquarters: Liberty House, Nairobi, Kenya
- Key people: Abel Munda; Managing Director; Peter Nderitu Gethi; Chairman
- Products: Life insurance and pensions
- Net income: ▼KES: 0.4685 billion (2015)
- Total assets: ▲KES: 23.50 billion (2015)
- Parent: Liberty Kenya Holdings
- Website: www.liberty.co.ke

The Liberty Life Assurance Kenya Limited, commonly referred to as Liberty Life, is a Kenyan life insurance company headquartered in Nairobi, Kenya. It is among the five largest life insurance companies in Kenya. It is a subsidiary of Liberty Kenya Holdings, which is an insurance holding company with headquarters in Nairobi.

Liberty Life is licensed and regulated by the Insurance Regulatory Authority of Kenya (IRA), the Retirement Benefits Authority of Kenya (RBA) and is a member of the Association of Kenya Insurers (AKI).

== History ==
Liberty Life Assurance Kenya Limited can trace its roots to 1964 when it was founded as Kenya American Insurance Company Limited; the company provided insurance services, investment solutions, education and retirement savings plans. In 1987 the company had a name change to American Life Insurance Company (Kenya) Limited, ALICO. Later, in 2004, ALICO was owned by CFC Bank (now Stanbic Bank) leading to a further metamorphosis of the organization's name into CFC Life Assurance Limited.

The company, through further change during 2008 when Stanbic Bank merged with CFC Bank (to form CFC Stanbic, now Stanbic Bank); which brought CFC Life and Heritage Insurance Company under CFC Stanbic Holdings which was also the financial services conglomerate that encompassed CFC Stanbic Bank and CFC Financial Services after the acquisition that happened that year. Later in July 2010 the CFC Stanbic Holdings Limited shareholders would participate in a vote that lead to the separation and demerger of the company's insurance and banking sections.

In 2011 CFC Insurance Holdings became listed on the Nairobi Securities Exchange, (NSE). CFC Life changed its name fully to Liberty Life Assurance Kenya Limited in October 2014.

== Non-insurance related ==
Sponsorship

Kajiado Township Primary School Library, a library whose sponsorship was done by Liberty Life in partnership with Heritage Insurance and Oxford Press Kenya. Abel Munda, the Liberty Life managing director, also a KES 800,000 borehole in the school. The facilities were sponsored to benefit not only the school's students but also to benefit the more than 1,400 students from neighboring schools in the Kajiado County, Kenya, and to enable the nurturing of innovation, curiosity and problem solving among the students.

== See also ==
- List of insurance companies in Kenya
- Stanlib Kenya
- Stanbic Bank Kenya
- Capital Markets Authority of Kenya
