= Safika Holdings =

Private South African investment holding company

Safika Holdings (Pty) Ltd
- Company type: Proprietary limited
- Founded: 1995
- Founder: Moss Ngoasheng; Vuli Cuba
- Headquarters: Safika House; Houghton, Johannesburg
- Key people: Moss Ngoasheng (CEO); Saki Macozoma (executive chairman)
- Website: safika.co.za

Safika Holdings (Pty) Ltd is a private South African investment holding company. Led by Moss Ngoasheng and Saki Macozoma, the company is known for its involvement in lucrative black economic empowerment deals and for its close relationship and reciprocal shareholdings with Standard Bank. It holds international investments in a variety of sectors, including mining and financial services.

Based in Johannesburg, Safika Holdings was founded in 1995 by Ngoasheng and Vuli Cuba. Macozoma joined the company in 2001 and became an equal participant in 2003.

== History ==
Safika Holdings was founded in 1995 by Moss Ngoasheng and Vuli Cuba. Prominent anti-apartheid activist Saki Macozoma joined the company in 2001 when he purchased a 10 per cent stake in Safika. He doubled his stake in 2003, becoming an equal participant – with Cuba and Ngoasheng – in the consortium that held a controlling 60 per cent of the company. During its first decade, Safika acquired a reputation as a major player in black economic empowerment (BEE) deals.

In the mid-2000s, Safika established reciprocal shareholdings with Standard Bank, which identified Safika as a preferred BEE partner on the basis of its "management capabilities". In June 2003, Standard Bank and the Liberty Group sold a 25.2 per cent stake in Stanlib to a BEE consortium led by Safika. The following year, Safika and Cyril Ramaphosa's Millennium Consolidated Investments launched the Tutuwa Consortium, which in July 2004 concluded agreements to acquire an effective 10 per cent of Standard Bank and 10 per cent of Liberty Life. Safika had a 20 per cent stake in Tutuwa, and the deal was worth an estimated R4.3 billion. Finally, in 2005, the Competition Commission approved the sale to Standard Bank of a 20 per cent stake in Safika.

Upon the conclusion of the 2005 deal, Safika's shareholders were Standard Bank (20 per cent), Ngoasheng (20 per cent), Cuba (20 per cent), Macozoma (20 per cent), Marc Ber (10 per cent), Soto Ndukwana (5 per cent), and Richard Chauke (5 per cent); this shareholding structure prevailed until Cuba announced his resignation from the company in 2008. Over the next decade, Safika maintained what it called its "close working relationship" with Standard Bank.

== Holdings ==
Through its subsidiaries, Safika has interests in financial services, agriculture, transport, gaming, aerospace, property, and telecommunications. In 2011, it expanded to Australia by launching private equity firm Winsaf as a joint venture with the Australian Wingate Group.

Safika also has substantial interests in South African mining through subsidiary Safika Resources, in which it has an 85 per cent interest. Safika Resources's flagship investment is a 39 per cent stake in Ntsimbintle Mining, which in turn holds various manganese assets, notably including a 50.1 per cent of Tshipi é Ntle Manganese Mining and its lucrative Tshipi Borwa mine in the Northern Cape. In 2019, Safika Resources also acquired a substantial 44.72 per cent stake in Orion Minerals's Prieska Resources, a zinc-and-copper-oriented venture.
