= Gordon Institute of Business Science =

South African business school

- Other name: GIBS Business School
- Type: Business school
- Established: 2000
- Accreditation: Triple Crown Accreditation: Association to Advance Collegiate Schools of Business (AACSB), the Association of MBAs (AMBA), and the European Quality Improvement System (EQUIS)
- Affiliations: University of Pretoria
- Dean: Professor Morris Mthombeni
- Students: 10,500 academic alumni
- Location: Johannesburg, Gauteng, South Africa; 26.1294°S 28.0464°E
- Campus: Urban
- Colours: Dark blue
- Website: www.gibs.co.za

Centres:
- Centre for African Management and Markets
- Centre for Business Ethics
- Entrepreneurship Development Academy (EDA)
- Centre for Leadership and Dialogue
- Personal and Applied Learning

Initiatives

- Responsible Finance Initiative
- GIBS Principles for Responsible Management Education (PRME)
- GIBS Media Leadership Think Tank

The Gordon Institute of Business Science (GIBS) is the business school for the University of Pretoria, and it is situated in Illovo, Johannesburg, South Africa. GIBS is Triple Crown accredited, holding EQUIS accreditation from the European Foundation for Management Development (EFMD), the Association of MBAs (AMBA), and the Association to Advance Collegiate Schools of Business (AACSB). The School also holds regional accreditation from the Association of African Business Schools (AABS) and accreditation from the South African Council on Higher Education (CHE). GIBS is a member of the South African Business Schools Association (SABSA) and Global Business School Network (GBSN). GIBS is a United Nations Principles for Responsible Management (PRME) Champion and is an affiliate of the Central and East European Management Development Association (CEEMAN).

GIBS offers programmess including the Masters in Business Administration (MBA), Post Graduate Diploma in Business Administration with a specialisation in General Management (PGDip) Postgraduate Diploma in Business Administration (PDBA), MPhils specialising in Corporate Strategy, Change Leadership, Leading New Economies, Evidence Based Management and Doctor of Business Administration (DBA/PHD). In 2012, the GIBS DBA became the first South African doctoral programme in business to receive international accreditation from AMBA. GIBS also offers various executive programmes: short courses, executive-level program like the Global Executive Development and General Management Programme, and company-specific programs. Extended programmes are longer certificate programmes and include the Social Entrepreneurship Programme, Leading Women Programme, and Nexus Leadership Programme.

== History and campus ==
GIBS was established in January 2000 following a contribution by Sir Donald Gordon, the founder of Liberty Life and Liberty International, and a major investment by the University of Pretoria following discussions that started in 1998. The business school follows on the university's Graduate School of Management's long tradition of MBA tuition. Founded in 1949, the GSM MBA was the first MBA program to be launched outside of North America. The GSM, as of January 2008, was formally replaced by the Gordon Institute of Business Science.

GIBS is situated in a greenfield campus on Illovo Boulevard, a mixed-use commercial node between the suburbs of Rosebank and Sandton in Johannesburg, with a satellite inner city campus on Pritchard Street. Accommodation is provided on the Illovo campus by the on-campus Illovo Hotel. The Illovo campus is served by the Rosebank Gautrain station, with a nearby Gautrain bus stop and the inner city campus by the Johannesburg Park Station.

Sir Donald Gordon

Sir Donald Gordon (24 June 1930 – 21 November 2019) was a South African businessman and philanthropist. He was educated at King Edward VII School in Johannesburg before doing his articles to be a Chartered Accountant at the firm Kessel Feinstein (now Grant Thornton). He founded the Liberty Life Association of Africa in 1957, out of which he formed Transatlantic Insurance Holdings plc, now Liberty International (a property portfolio of £6.2 billion (2009)) and Liberty Holdings Limited (total assets of R449 billion (2011)). He was a co-founder of the British company Abbey Life. In June 2005, he was awarded a British knighthood in recognition of his services to the arts and business.

== Rankings ==
Financial Times World Ranking	2019	2020	2021	2022	2023	2024	2025	2026
Executive MBA	82	-						
Executive Education Customised	45	60	-	-	44	72	64	51
Executive Education Open	38	32	-	-	41	26	37	39

== Academics ==
In 2021, the school had 35 permanent faculty members, 29 adjunct faculty members, 11 international faculty members, 8 extraordinary professors, and 1 honorary professor (80% of faculty members hold a doctorate). In 2026, the school’s faculty comprised 46 permanent faculty members, of whom 85% hold doctorates and 39% are international; 43 adjunct faculty members (66% doctorate-qualified, 33% international) and 11 extraordinary professors, all of whom hold doctorates, with 73% being international. Past and present faculty members include Gill Marcus (ninth Governor of the South African Reserve Bank) and Nick Binedell.

Company-specific programs clients include Standard Bank, Anglo American PLC, ABSA, SABMiller, Sasol, the United Nations Children's Fund (UNICEF) and the South African National Treasury among others. The company-specific programs have been delivered in 22 countries and include certificates in senior management development, wealth management, middle management development as well as its foundation management development.
