= Sirius 1 Solar Power Station =

Solar power station in South Africa

- Country: South Africa
- Location: Upington, Dawid Kruiper Municipality, ZF Mgcawu District, Northern Cape, South Africa
- Coordinates: 28°32′45″S 21°06′16″E
- Status: Operational
- Construction began: December 2018
- Commission date: February 2020
- Construction cost: US$140.753 million
- Owner: Scatec Solar
- Operator: Scatec

Solar farm
- Type: Flat-panel PV
- Site area: 250 hectares (620 acres)

Power generation
- Nameplate capacity: 86 MW (115,000 hp)
- Annual net output: 217 GWh

External links
- Website: [ Homepage]

The Sirius 1 Solar Power Station, is an 86 MW solar power station in South Africa. The power station was developed by a joint venture between Aurora Power Solutions and Sirius Solar PV Project One. The off-taker of the energy generated here is Eskom Holdings, the South African national electricity utility parastatal company. A 20-year power purchase agreement between Eskom and the owners of the power station, governs the purchase and sale of electricity between the two. Commercial commissioning was achieved in February 2020.

== Location ==
The power station sits on 250 hectares (620 acres), near the town of Upington, in Dawid Kruiper Municipality, in ZF Mgcawu District, in the Northern Cape Province of South Africa. The solar farm is located approximately 24 kilometres (15 mi), southwest of the central business district of Upington. The geographical coordinates of the power station are: 28°32'45.0"S, 21°06'16.0"E (Latitude:-28.545833; Longitude:21.104444).

== Overview ==
The design calls for a ground-mounted solar park with capacity generation of 86 MW. The power station comprises 277,500 solar panels, manufactured by BYD Electronic. Other infrastructure includes 37 Sunny Central 2200 inverters, supplied by SMA Solar Technology. The concession for this project was awarded in 2015, during the 4th round of the Renewable Energy Independent Power Producer Procurement Programme (REIPPP) of the South African government.

== Ownership ==
As of December 2021, the ownership of this power station, was as illustrated in the table below.

Shareholding in Sirius 1 Solar Power Station
Rank	Shareholder	Domicile	Percentage	Notes
1	Scatec Solar	Norway	42.0	
2	H1 Holdings	South Africa	35.0	
3	Norfund	Norway	18.0	
4	Upington Community Trust	South Africa	5.0	
	Total		100.0	

=== Change in ownership ===
In February 2023, Scatec Solar and Norfund, both of Norway sold their combined 60 percent shareholding previously held in the 258 megawatts Upington Solar Complex, comprising Dyasons Klip 1 Solar Power Station, Dyasons Klip 2 Solar Power Station and Sirius 1 Solar Power Station. Their ownership in each of these solar farms was purchased by Stanlib Asset Management Proprietary, "an asset manager based in Johannesburg, South Africa". The deal required South African regulatory approval.

The sale of Scatec's 42 percent shareholding was completed in June 2023, for a consideration of US$49 million. However, Scatec retained the operations and maintenance (O&M) contract for the Upington Solar Complex.

== Construction and timeline ==
The engineering, procurement and construction (EPC) contract was awarded to Scatec Solar, who also have the 20-year operations and management contract. The cost of construction is reported as US$140.753 million. Construction started in December 2018. Commercial commissioning was achieved in February 2020.

== Other considerations ==
Scatec Solar, in partnership with Norfund and H1 Holdings, won concessions for three solar plants, two of which are now online. The three power stations are Serius 1 Solar Power Station (86 MW), Dyason's Klip 1 Solar Power Station (86 MW) and Dyason's Klip 2 Solar Power Station (86 MW).

The cost for the three solar farms is budgeted at US$317 million, borrowed on syndicated terms arranged by Standard Bank Group. Of the $317 million, $244.1 million was borrowed and the owners of the power stations injected US$72.9 million as equity investment.

== See also ==
- List of power stations in South Africa
