= Liberty Kenya Holdings Limited =

- Company type: Public Company
- Traded as: KN: LBTY
- Industry: Insurance
- Founded: 1964; 62 years ago
- Revenue: ▲KES: 8.30 billion (2014)
- Net income: ▲KES: 1.15 billion (2014)
- Total equity: ▲KES: 6.16 billion (2014)
- Parent: Liberty Holdings Limited
- Website: www.libertykenya.co.ke

Liberty Kenya Holdings Limited is a major Kenyan insurance company that is a subsidiary of the South African Liberty Holdings Limited, a Pan-African financial services company.

The group's headquarters are located in Nairobi, Kenya, with subsidiaries in Kenya and Tanzania. The flagship company of the group is CFC Life, with headquarters in the CFC House along Mamlaka Road in Nairobi, Kenya's capital and largest city.

== History ==
The group was founded in Kenya in 1964 as the Kenya American Insurance Company Limited as part of the AIG Group of companies. In 1987, the organization changed its name to American Life Insurance Company (Kenya) Limited – ALICO Kenya. CfC Bank holdings acquired ALICO Kenya in 2004 and changed its name to CfC Life Assurance Company Ltd.

In 2008, CfC Bank holdings merged with Stanbic bank, forming CFC Stanbic Bank Holding which was now a subsidiary of the Standard Bank Group.

In 2011, Liberty Holdings Limited became the strategic investor in CfC Life and Heritage with the listing of CfC Insurance Holdings on the Nairobi Securities Exchange through introduction. This was a form of demerger from CFC Stanbic Holdings which separated the banking and insurance business of the group. Existing CFC Stanbic Holdings shareholders were allocated shares in the newly listed company. This was the first company spin-off on the NSE

In 2012, the company changed its name from CFC Insurance Holdings to Liberty Kenya Holdings Limited to align the group to the Liberty Group corporate brand.

In 2014, Liberty Kenya Holdings made history again by being the first listed firm in Kenya to have a scrip issue. This was a cash-retention strategy by the firm.

The group announced that its life insurance subsidiary, CfC Life Assurance Company, was re-branding to Liberty Life Assurance Kenya Limited with effect from 28 October 2014.

== Principal subsidiaries ==
Liberty Kenya Holdings Limited consists of the following companies:

- Liberty Life Assurance Kenya Limited - Life insurance - Nairobi, Kenya 100% shareholding - An insurance company in Kenya offering long term life insurance and assurance services. This is the flagship company of the group.
- Heritage Insurance Company Kenya Limited - General insurance - Nairobi, Kenya 100% shareholding - An insurance company in Kenya offering short-term and general insurance services.
- Heritage Insurance Company of Tanzania - General insurance - Dar es Salaam, Tanzania 60% - An insurance company in Tanzania offering short-term and general insurance services. This entity is held by the group through Heritage Insurance Company Kenya Limited.
- CfC Investments Limited - Investments - Nairobi, Kenya 100% shareholding - Offers investment services.
- Azali Limited - Dormant - Nairobi, Kenya 100% shareholding - This entity is held by the group through Heritage Insurance Company Kenya Limited.

The group has one associate company:

- Strategis Insurance Tanzania Limited - General insurance - Dar es Salaam, Tanzania 43% - An insurance company in Tanzania offering corporate and group medical insurance services. This entity is held by the group through Heritage Insurance Company Tanzania Limited. On May 1, 2014, the group announced that it was in talks with its co-investors in Strategis that could see the Group take a majority stake or acquire all of Strategis’ shares.

== Ownership ==
The shares of Liberty Kenya Holdings Limited are listed on the Nairobi Stock Exchange (NSE), where they trade under the symbol CFCI. The shareholding of Liberty Kenya Holdings is as follows:

Liberty Kenya Holdings Limited stock ownership

Rank	Name of owner	Percentage ownership
1	Liberty Holdings Limited	57.74
2	African Liaison and Consultants Services Limited	15.35
3	Others via Nairobi Securities Exchange	26.91
	Total	100.00

== Governance ==
Liberty Kenya Holdings Limited is governed by a five-person board of directors with Philip Odera as chairperson and Mike du Toit as the managing director.

== See also ==
- CfC Stanbic Holdings
- Economy of Kenya
- Liberty Holdings Limited
- List of Insurance companies in Kenya
- Nairobi Stock Exchange
- Standard Bank Group
