= Odera =

Odera is a surname. Notable people with the surname include:

- Chris Odera (1963–2012), Kenyan boxer
- Ezekiel Odera (born 1988), Kenyan footballer
- Owiso Odera (1974–2016), Sudanese-born Kenyan actor
- Philip Odera (born 1961), Kenyan economist, businessman, and bank executive
