= INTU =

INTU may refer to:

- Intu, property company in the United Kingdom
- Intuit, (software company)
