= Patrick Mweheire =

Ugandan banker

- Born: Patrick Mweheire; 1970 (age 55–56); Kampala, Uganda
- Education: Daemen College (BA in History & Economics); Harvard Business School (Master of Business Administration)
- Occupation: Bank Executive
- Years active: 1994–present
- Title: Group CEO; Standard Bank Group for Eastern Africa
- Spouse: 1

Patrick Mweheire is a Ugandan investment banker and bank executive. He is the regional group managing director and regional group chief executive of Standard Bank Group for Eastern Africa. He took up this position on 1 March 2020.

Before that, from January 2015, until February 2020, he served as the managing director and CEO of Stanbic Bank Uganda Limited. the largest commercial bank in the country, by assets and branch list.

== Background and education ==
Mweheire was born in 1970, to an affluent family, with three other siblings. He grew up on Nakasero Hill, arguably one of the most upscale residential neighborhoods in Kampala, the capital and largest city in Uganda. He attended Kings College Budo, for his O-Level and A-Level education, graduating in 1990. In 1990, he enrolled in Daemen College in upstate New York, graduating in 1994, with a magna cum laude degree of Bachelor of Arts in History and Economics, in 1994, also receiving the President's Medal awarded to the most distinguished student for that graduating year. In 1999, he graduated from Harvard Business School with the degree of Master of Business Administration (MBA).

== Career ==
In 1993, while still an undergraduate, Mweheire interned for three months on Wall Street, at Prudential Securities. After graduation in 1994, he was hired as a Financial Analyst in the investment banking division, working there until 1997. Following his MBA studies at Harvard Business School, he was hired by Merrill Lynch. He worked in their mergers & acquisitions—investment banking division from 1999 until 2008, rising from a junior banker all the way to the top. In 2008, he was hired by Renaissance Capital to run their African investment banking unit, based out of London, with a presence in 7 African countries. In 2012, he relocated back to Uganda to take up the position of executive director and Head of Corporate and Investment Banking at Stanbic Bank Uganda (SBU). In January 2015, the Board of Directors at SBU appointed Patrick Mweheire as managing director and CEO of the bank, replacing Philip Odera, a Kenyan national. Mweheire is the first Ugandan to head the bank since Standard Bank became majority shareholder in 2001.

In 2020, Mweheire was appointed Regional Chief Executive for Eastern Africa (managing bank franchises in Kenya, Uganda, Tanzania, Ethiopia and South Sudan), for the Standard Bank Group, based in Nairobi, Kenya. He was replaced at Stanbic Bank Uganda, by another investment banker, Anne Juuko.

== Other responsibilities ==
He is married with one son. He is a fan of Chelsea FC, in the English Premier League.

== See also ==
- Standard Bank Group
- Stanbic Bank
- List of banks in Uganda
