= Wendy Appelbaum =

South African businesswoman and philanthropist (born 1961)

- Born: Wendy Gordon; 1960 (age 65–66)
- Citizenship: South Africa
- Education: University of the Witwatersrand
- Spouse: Hylton Appelbaum
- Father: Donald Gordon

Wendy Appelbaum (née Gordon; born 1960) is a South African businesswoman and philanthropist. The daughter of Sir Donald Gordon, founder of the Liberty Group, she has owned the De Morgenzon wine estate in Stellenbosch since 2003.

Appelbaum is one of the richest women in South Africa. Through her family inheritance and business interests, Forbes estimated her net worth at $183 million in 2012, though she dismissed this estimate as "complete rubbish."

== Life and career ==
Appelbaum was born in 1960 and grew up in Johannesburg, South Africa. She was one of three children, and the only daughter, born to insurance magnate Donald Gordon and his wife Peggy. She hoped to become a medical doctor but was not accepted into medical school; instead, she studied psychology at the University of the Witwatersrand, graduating with a Bachelor of Arts in 1982.

In the early 1990s, she gained her first directorship when she was appointed to the board of Liberty Investors, the holding company of her father's Liberty Group. In 1994, she became a co-founder and deputy chairman of Women's Investment Portfolio Holdings (Wiphold), but she sold her stake in the company soon after it became the first female-controlled company to list on the JSE. Thereafter she joined the boards of several other companies. But her father sold the family's control of the Liberty Group after he retired in 1999, telling the Business Report that Appelbaum was "terribly miserable" about his decision but that she was "better off at home looking after my grandchildren" than running the family business.

In 2003, Appelbaum and her husband bought De Morgenzon, a commercial wine estate in Stellenbosch where she makes award-winning wines. In 2011, she also bought the nearby Quoin Rock estate on auction for R60 million after tax authorities seized it from Dave King. Shortly after the auction she repudiated the purchase when it became apparent that the auctioneer had created a fictitious 'chandelier bidder' to push the price up.

== Philanthropy and activism ==
Appelbaum is a trustee of the Donald Gordon Foundations, one of the largest philanthropies in Africa. For many years she was a member of Peggy Rockefeller's Global Philanthropists' Circle, a trustee of the Helen Suzman Foundation, a member of Harvard University's Women's Leadership Board, and of The President of Harvard's Global Advisory Council. She is a member of the International Women's Forum. She is also known for adopting social causes: she pursued a successful consumer protection complaint against the Auction Alliance after becoming convinced that it had attempted to defraud her through ghost bidding in the Quoin Rock sale,. She also supported a successful legal challenge in the Constitutional Court against garnishee orders.

She is a director of the Wits Donald Gordon Medical Centre (WDGMC), a tertiary training hospital owned by the University of the Witwatersrand .

She was a director of Synergos Africa, an international developmental organisation focused on finding solutions to issues relating to poverty and health She was a founding member of Women Moving Millions

== Honours ==
Forbes named Appelbaum to its list of Africa's 50 Most Powerful Women in 2020 and to its list of 50 Over 50: EMEA in 2023. Her alma mater awarded her an honorary doctorate in medicine in December 2019.

== Personal life ==
She is married to Hylton Appelbaum and has two sons.
