= Insurance Regulatory Authority =

Insurance Regulatory Authority may refer to:

- Insurance Regulatory Authority (Kenya)
- Insurance Regulatory Authority of Uganda
