= Dyason's Klip 1 Solar Power Station =

Solar farm in South Africa

Dayson's Klip 1 Solar Power Station
- Country: South Africa
- Location: Upington, Dawid Kruiper Municipality, ZF Mgcawu District, Northern Cape, South Africa
- Coordinates: 28°34′15″S 21°03′52″E
- Status: Commissioned
- Commission date: February 2020
- Construction cost: US$140.75 Million
- Owner: Dyason's Klip 1 Solar Consortium
- Operator: Scatec

Solar farm
- Type: Flat-panel PV
- Site area: 208 hectares (514 acres)

Power generation
- Nameplate capacity: 86 MW (115,000 hp)
- Annual net output: 217 GWh

The Dyason's Klip 1 Power Station, (also Dyasons Klip 1 Power Station), is an 86 megawatts solar power plant in South Africa. The power station was developed and is owned and operated by a consortium comprising an international independent power producer (IPP), South African and European investors and a local charitable trust. Commercially commissioned in February 2020, the solar farm's 217 GWh of energy production annually is sold to Eskom, the national electricity utility company, under a long-term power purchase agreement (PPA).

== Location ==
The solar farm is located in the settlement of Dyasons Klip in Dawid Kruiper Municipality (ZF Mgcawu District), Northern Cape Province. Dyasons Klip is located approximately 31 kilometres (19 mi), southwest of Upington, the nearest large town. The geographical coordinates of the Dyasons Klip 1 solar farm are:28°34'15.0"S, 21°03'52.0"E (Latitude:-28.570833; Longitude:21.064444).

== Overview ==
The lead developer in Dyasons Klip 1 power plant is the Norwegian IPP, Scatec, which has interests in two other solar farms in the Upington Solar Complex. The other two are (a) Sirius 1 Solar Power Station (86 MW), that was commissioned in February 2020 and (b) the 86 MW Dyason's Klip 2 Power Station under development. The three solar power plants, with a cumulative generation capacity of 258 MW are part of South Africa's Renewable Energy Independent Power Producer Procurement Programme (REIPPP).

The power station comprises 277,500 modules each rated at 310 Watts, supplied by BYD of China. It also contains 37 Sunny Central 2200 inverters manufactured by SMA Solar Technology of Germany.

== Developers ==
The consortium that owns this power station has four shareholders as illustrated in the table below. For descriptive purposes we will call the special purpose vehicle company that owns and operates the solar farm Dyasons Klip 1 Solar Consortium.

Shareholding in Dyasons Klip 1 Solar Consortium
Rank	Shareholder	Domicile	Percentage	Notes
1	Scatec Solar	Norway	42.0	
2	Norfund	Norway	18.0	
3	H1 Holdings	South Africa	35.0	
4	Upington Community Trust	South Africa	5.0	
	Total		100.00	

=== Change in ownership ===
In February 2023, Scatec Solar and Norfund, both of Norway divested from the 258 megawatts Upington Solar Complex, comprising Dyasons Klip 1 Solar Power Station, Dyasons Klip 2 Solar Power Station and Sirius 1 Solar Power Station. Their combined 60 percent shareholding in each of these solar farms was purchased by Stanlib Asset Management Proprietary, "an asset manager based in Johannesburg, South Africa". The deal requires South African regulatory approval.

== Construction costs ==
The cost of construction is reported as US$140.75 million.

== See also ==
- List of power stations in South Africa
