= Saki Macozoma =

South African former political prisoner (born 1957)

Sakumzi Justice Macozoma (Saki) (born 1957) is a South African former political prisoner who is now one of South Africa's most prominent businessman and a leader in civil society.

== Early life and education ==
Macozoma was born in Port Elizabeth on 12 May 1957. He studied political science, economics, and journalism at the University of South Africa (UNISA) and at Boston University in the USA. He holds a BA degree from Unisa.

== Political and business life ==
After spending five years in prison alongside Nelson Mandela on Robben Island for anti-apartheid activities he joined the South African Council of Churches. He also worked for the African National Congress (ANC) and South African Breweries. Macozoma is one of a small group of former ANC politicians who left politics and rapidly became successful in the business world. He became an ANC Member of Parliament in 1994 but left the legislature in 1996 to become managing director of Transnet Limited, South Africa's largest parastatal and South African Railways and Harbours Administration. During this time he was also chairman of South African Airways.

Makozoma is chairman of Vodacom Group Limited, Tshipi é Ntle Manganese Mining (Pty) Limited, international investment house, Safika Holdings and Ntsimbintle Mining BEE, which is owned by a number of Black Economic Empowerment groups and Safika Resources Limited. Safika Resources is a 100% owned subsidiary of Safika Holdings Limited and has a 74% interest in Ntsimbintle Newco Mining that in turn own a 50.1% interest in Tshipi é Ntle Manganese Mining (Pty) Limited. He is also a director of Volkswagen South Africa. OM Holdings Limited, a Singapore-based Australian Stock Exchange quoted company, own a 26% interest in Ntsimbintle Newco Mining. Jupiter Mining Limited, a public quoted Australian company on the Australian Securities Exchange ASX, own 49.9% of Tshipi é Ntle Manganese Mining (Pty) Ltd – Nsimbintle Holdings Limited owns a 19.9% interest in Jupiter Mining Limited. Tshipi abandoned its sale of the company and will no longer IPO in South Africa as previously planned. Jupiter Kalahari (Mauritius) Limited, 100% owned subsidiary of Jupiter Mining Limited, exited a joint venture agreement with OM Tshipi(s)PTE on 11 April 2017. The venture marketed all Manganese ore produced at the Tshipi Borwa Mine. OM Tshipi(s)PTE will continue to market Manganese ore from Tshipi Borwa mine.

On 10 August 2021 Macozoma was appointed to his advisory panel by Oscar Mabuyane, the premier of South Africa's Eastern Cape province.

From 2007 to December 2013, Macozoma was chairman of Liberty Holdings. He resigned to concentrate on his business interests. Before joining Standard Bank he was chief executive of New Africa Investments Limited (Nail), a publicly listed investment company with a broad portfolio that included radio stations, outdoor media and the Hertz car rental company.

Macozoma is well known for his work in civil society and is a former chairman of the Council of Higher Education and former chairman of the University of Witwatersrand Council. He is a member of the Board of Governors of Rhodes University and chairman of the Kwazulu Natal Philharmonic Orchestra.

Mr. Macozoma has also served as president of Business Leadership South Africa (African Leadership Academy) and of the President's Big Business Working Group (List of business schools in South Africa) and formerly co-chairman of the Business Trust (South African company law.

He was a member of the National Executive Committee of the African National Congress from 1991 to 2008.

In 2005 Billy Masethla, then director of South Africa's National Intelligence Agency (NIA), was arrested and charged with illegally conducting surveillance of Mr Macozoma and his family.

== Move to COPE ==
On 28 February 2009 Mr. Macozoma briefly joined Congress of the People(COPE), a party that broke away from the ruling African National Congress in 2008. Mr Macozoma is now politically unaffiliated.

== Awards ==
In 2012 Macozoma and former president Nelson Mandela were together awarded the University of South Africa's (UNISA) highest honour, a Calabash award ( South Africa UNISA Calabash Award ) and the UKZN Scholarship Awards, Robben Island alumnus award, designed to honour those imprisoned by the apartheid regime because they fought against the system of State oppression.

The Anglican Church of Southern Africa honoured Macozoma when the Most Rev'd Thabo Makgoba, Archbishop of Cape Town admitted him to the Order of Simon of Cyrene at a meeting of the church's Provincial Synod in Benoni, Gauteng on 1 Oct 2013
