= Philip Odera =

Kenyan economist

- Born: Philip Odera; 1961 (age 64–65); Maseno, Kenya
- Education: St. Lawrence University (BA.Econ.); Suffolk University (MBA)
- Occupations: Economist, bank executive, businessman
- Years active: 1995 – present
- Title: Managing director & CEO; Stanbic Bank

Philip Odera is an economist, businessman and bank executive in Kenya, the largest economy in the East African Community. He is the designate managing director and chief executive officer of CfC Stanbic Bank Limited, a Kenyan financial institution, with total assets of US$2 billion (KES:180.51 billion), as of December 2013. From 2007 until 2014, he was the CEO and managing director of Stanbic Bank Uganda, the largest commercial bank in Uganda.

== Background and education ==
Odera was born in Maseno, Kisumu County, in the former Nyanza Province in western Kenya, circa 1961. He attended local schools before he relocated to the United States for further studies. He holds the degree of Bachelor of Arts in economics from St. Lawrence University in New York State. He also holds the degree of Master of Business Administration majoring in Finance, from Suffolk University in Massachusetts.

== Career ==
Prior to 2007, Philip Odera worked with Stanbic IBTC Bank, a large banking institution in Nigeria, with total assets valued in excess of NGN:763 billion (US$3.74 billion), as of December 2013. Stanbic IBTC Bank is a subsidiary of Standard Bank of South Africa. From 2007 until 2014, he was the managing director and CEO of Stanbic Bank Uganda, the country's largest commercial bank by assets. In February 2015, he was appointed by the board of directors at CfC Stanbic Holdings to become the new CEO, pending regulatory approval by the Central Bank of Kenya.

== See also ==
- Standard Bank
- List of banks in Kenya
