= Wole Adeniyi =

Nigerian banker

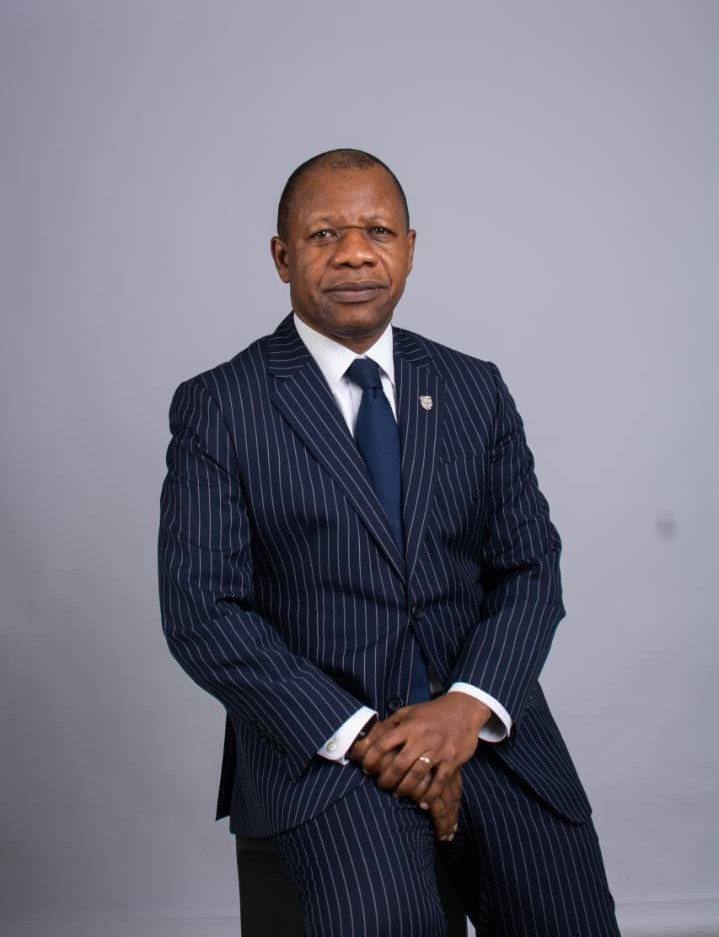
- Citizenship: Nigerian
- Education: Holds a degree in Business Administration from the University of Benin and a Master of Business Administration (MBA) from the University of Manchester.
- Occupation: Chief Executive Officer (CEO) of Stanbic IBTC Bank Limited

Wole Adeniyi is a Nigerian banker who is Chief Executive Officer of Stanbic IBTC Bank Limited, a subsidiary of the Standard Bank Group. He has held leadership roles across operations, retail, and digital banking.

== Early life and education ==
Adeniyi holds a degree in Business Administration from the University of Benin and a Master of Business Administration (MBA) from the University of Manchester.

According to his professional profile on the Nigeria–South Africa Chamber of Commerce (NSACC) website, Adeniyi is a Fellow of the Institute of Chartered Accountants of Nigeria (ICAN) and the Chartered Institute of Bankers of Nigeria (CIBN). He is also listed as an Associate of the Chartered Institute of Taxation of Nigeria (CITN) and a Certified Information Systems Auditor (CISA).

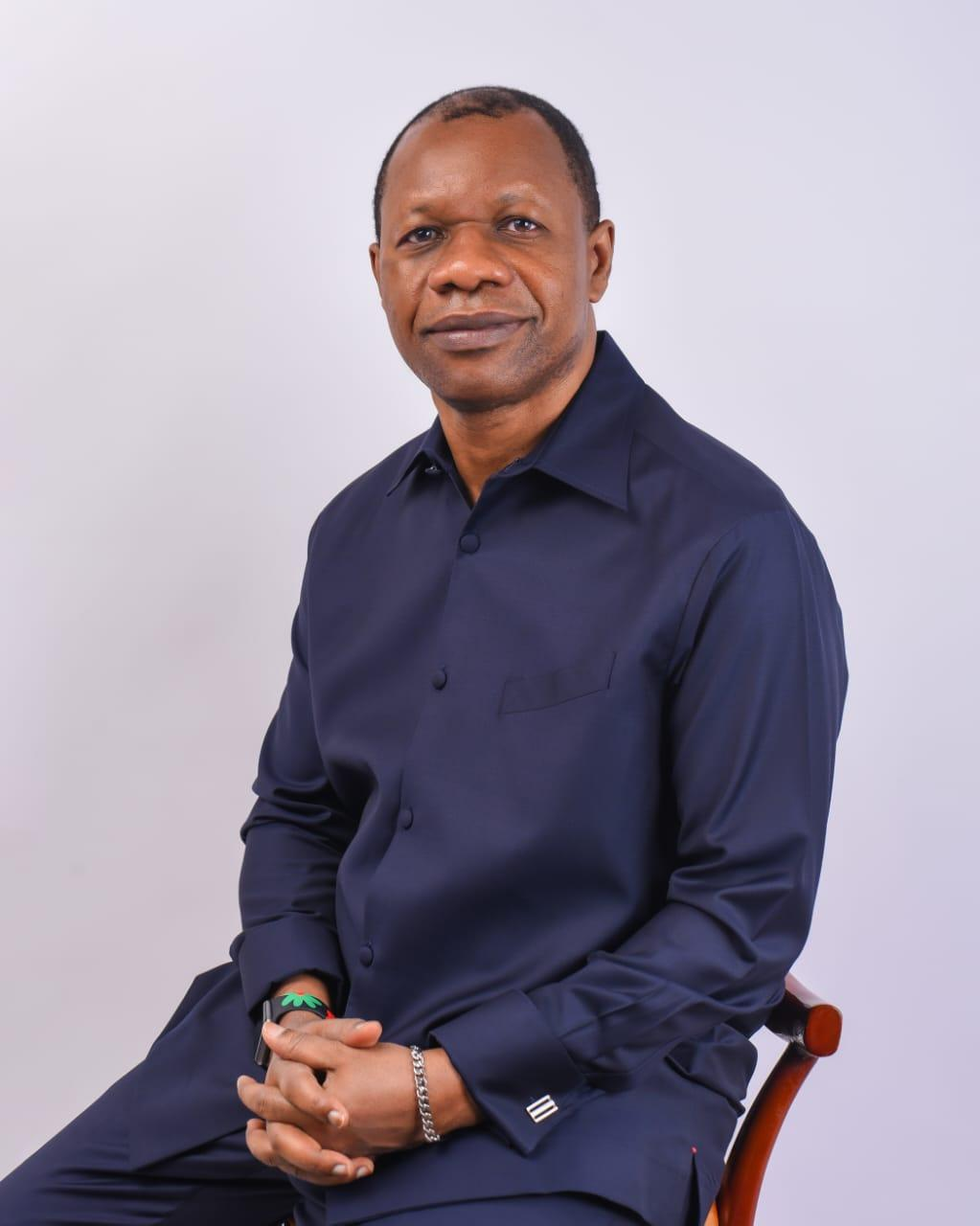
Wole Adeniyi

== Career ==
According to Stanbic IBTC Bank’s official website, Adeniyi joined the bank in 2007, where he was Executive Director of Operations and later of Personal and Business Banking before being appointed Deputy Chief Executive Officer and subsequently Chief Executive Officer.

He was appointed Chief Executive Officer of Stanbic IBTC Bank in 2020 following the appointment of Dr. Demola Sogunle as Chief Executive Officer of Stanbic IBTC Holdings.

As an executive, he oversaw areas including operations, retail, and SME banking.

== Board memberships and affiliations ==
Adeniyi is on several corporate and economic boards. He sits on the boards of the Nigeria Inter-Bank Settlement System (NIBSS), the Nigerian Economic Summit Group (NESG), and the Nigeria–South Africa Chamber of Commerce.
