= Stanbic Holdings Plc =

Financial services organization in Kenya

- Formerly: CfC Stanbic Holdings Limited
- Type: Public
- Traded as: KN: CFC
- Industry: Financial services
- Founded: 2008; 18 years ago through merger
- Headquarters: Nairobi, Kenya
- Key people: Patrick M Mweheire (CEO), Kitili Mbathi (Chairman)
- Products: Commercial and Investment banking
- Revenue: ▲KSh 16.20 billion (2013)
- Net income: ▲KSh 5.41 billion (2013)
- Total assets: ▲KSh 180.51 billion (2013)
- Total equity: ▲KSh 32.4 billion (2013)
- Parent: Standard Bank
- Website: www.stanbicbank.co.ke

Stanbic Holdings Plc, formerly known as CfC Stanbic Holdings Limited, is a Kenyan financial services organization with headquarters in Nairobi, Kenya, with subsidiaries in Kenya and South Sudan. Stanbic Holdings is a member of the Standard Bank Group, a financial services giant based in South Africa. The institution is licensed and governed by the Central Bank of Kenya, the national banking regulator.

The institution serves the banking needs of large and small business customers as well as individuals. As of 2013, Stanbic Holdings Plc was a large financial services organization in Kenya, with an assets valued at over KSh 180.51 billion (US$1.78 billion). At that time, shareholder's equity was valued at about KSh 32.43 billion (US$319.696 million).

== History ==
CfC Stanbic Holdings is the result of a merger between Stanbic Bank Kenya Limited and CfC Bank Limited.

=== Before the merger ===
==== Stanbic Bank Kenya Limited ====
Stanbic Bank Kenya Limited (SBK) was established in 1958 when Ottoman Bank incorporated its first subsidiary in the region. This was after acquiring Torr's Hotel from Ewart Grogan and converting it to its head office. In 1969, Ottoman Bank sold its Kenyan operations to National and Grindlays Bank (NGB Kenya) making its exit from the East African market.

In 1970, the Kenya government and NGB entered into an agreement that saw the government takeover full control of NGB Kenya with the exception of the two branches inherited from Ottoman Bank, one in Nairobi while the other in Mombasa. NGB Kenya was then rebranded to Kenya Commercial Bank while the two separated branches became Grindlays Bank International (Kenya) Limited (GBI). Shareholding in GBI was 60 per cent by NGB London and 40 per cent by the government of Kenya.

In 1992, Standard Bank Investment Corporation (Stanbic Bank), a subsidiary of Standard Bank, acquired GBI by virtue of it being part of ANZ Grindlays Bank's African subsidiaries. The bank's name was changed from Grindlays Bank International (Kenya) Limited to Stanbic Bank Kenya Limited in 1993. At the point of the merger, the bank was 96.31% owned by Standard Bank through Stanbic Africa Holdings Limited (SAHL) and the balance of 3.69% held by the Government of Kenya.

==== CfC Bank Limited ====
CFC Bank Limited (CFC Bank) was incorporated in 1955 as Credit Finance Corporation, a finance institution, and was listed on the Nairobi Stock Exchange. Due to changing trends, regulatory requirements in the Kenyan banking industry and the need to meet growing customer requirements, Credit Finance Corporation obtained a commercial banking license from the Central Bank of Kenya in March 1995 and changed its name to CfC Bank Limited. The bank was associated with Moi Era individuals such as Former Attorney-General Charles Njonjo, Jeremiah Kiereini and Bruce Mackenzie who held shares in the company through African Liaison and Consultants Services Limited. In 2004, CfC Bank entered into the insurance industry through the acquisition of American Life Insurance Company (Kenya) Limited, a subsidiary of AIG and changed its name to CfC Life Assurance Company Limited (now part of Liberty Kenya Holdings Limited).

=== Merger 2007 ===
On 12 November 2007, the shareholders of CFC Bank at an Extraordinary General Meeting approved the merger of CFC Bank and Stanbic Bank. This was the largest banking merger in Kenya's history. The Merger was executed in three interlinked phases:

1. CfC Bank acquired 100 percent of SBK through the allotment new fully paid shares of CfC to SBK's shareholders.
2. On completion of the allotment of shares in phase one, SAHL acquired an additional CfC shares from existing shareholders. SAHL's shareholding in CfC was increased to 60 percent of the revised share capital of CfC.
3. On completion of phases one and two above, there was an internal reorganisation, effectively to transfer CfC's banking business to SBK to form a merged single banking operation. SBK was then renamed CfC Stanbic Bank Limited and retained its banking licence. The banking licence for CfC was returned to the Central Bank of Kenya to allow it to operate purely as a listed non-operating holding company, renamed CfC Stanbic Holdings Limited.

The merger process was completed by 1 June 2008.

The Post merger structure was as follows:

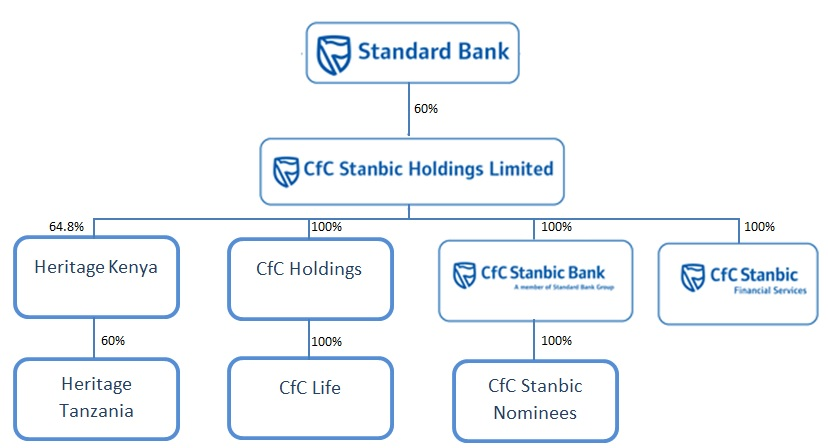
CfC Stanbic Holdings Post merger structure

=== Post-merger ===
After the Merger, the management engaged in restructuring of operation. In 2009, CfC Stanbic Holdings began restructuring its group corporate structure including the de-merger of the Insurance Businesses into CfC Insurance Holdings Limited. Liberty Holdings Limited came on board as strategic investor in CfC Insurance Holdings Limited. The restructure involved consolidating all its insurance businesses to CfC Insurance Holdings Limited and later a de-merger of the insurance arm. This was completed in April 2011 with the listing of CfC Insurance Holdings Limited on the NSE through introduction. These shares were distributed to CfC Stanbic Holdings shareholders as a form of dividend. The Banking and Financial Services Businesses were retained in CfC Stanbic Holdings and remain the core business of the group. CfC Insurance Holdings Limited was later renamed Liberty Kenya Holdings Limited as a step of aligning the group to the Liberty group corporate brand.

=== Expansion ===
CfC Stanbic Holdings expanded into South Sudan in 2012 making it the third Kenyan bank to venture into the new African nation, after Kenya Commercial Bank Group and Equity Group Holdings Limited.

In August 2016, the group dropped the 'CfC' brand and was renamed Stanbic Holdings plc.

== Member companies ==
The companies that comprise Stanbic Holdings include, but are not limited to, the following:

- Stanbic Bank Limited (100% share), a commercial bank in Kenya, serving individuals and businesses, focusing mainly on large corporations
- SBG Securities Limited (100% share), an Investment banking service provider in Nairobi
- Stanbic Insurance Agency Limited (100% share), a bancassurance service provider for the group.
- CfC Stanbic Nominees Limited (100% share), holds securities purchased on behalf of customers of Stanbic Bank, under the custodial services arrangements.
- CfC FS Nominees Limited (100% share), holds securities purchased on behalf of customers of SBG Securities Limited, under the custodial services arrangements.

== Ownership ==
The stock of Stanbic Holdings listed on the NSE, where it trades under the symbol: SBIC.

Stanbic Holdings Limited Stock Ownership
Rank	Name of Owner	Percentage Ownership
1	Stanbic Africa Holdings	74.92
2	Permanent Secretary to the Treasury of Kenya	1.10
3	Others	23.98
	Total	100.00

== Governance ==
The chairman of the Board of Directors of Stanbic Holdings, is Kitili Mbathi. Patrick Mweheire serves as the chief executive officer.

== See also ==
- Central Bank of Kenya
- Nairobi Stock Exchange
- Economy of Kenya
- Liberty Kenya Holdings Limited
- Standard Bank Group
- Liberty Holdings Limited
- List of banks in Kenya
- List of banks in South Sudan
