= First Assurance Kenya Limited =

- Company type: Subsidiary
- Industry: Financial services
- Founded: 1930; 96 years ago
- Headquarters: Nairobi, Kenya
- Products: Insurance policies & annuities
- Revenue: ▲ Aftertax: KES: 537,562,000 (US$5.363 million) (2014)
- Total assets: KES: 7.11 billion (US$71 million) (2014)
- Owner: Absa Group Limited (63.3%)
- Number of employees: 132 (2015)
- Website: firstassurance.co.ke

First Assurance Kenya Limited (FAKL), also First Assurance Company Limited, is an insurance company in Kenya. It is a member of Absa Group.

== History ==
The company was founded in 1930 as Prudential Assurance Company, later re-branding to its present name. In 2015, Barclays Africa Group of South Africa, acquired 63.3 percent shareholding in FAKL for an estimated KSh2.9 billion. The original shareholders received KSh2.2 billion and Barclays Africa injected KSh700 million new capital into the business.

== Overview ==
FAKL is a key financial services provider in East Africa. As at December 2014, the company's total assets were valued at KSh 7.11 billion (approx. US$71 million), with shareholders' equity valued at KSh2.162 billion (approx. US$21.6 million). In 2015, the company had 132 employees, with over 50,000 policyholders in general, medical and group life insurance. The insurance firm has five branches in Kenya; one branch each in Kisumu, Mombasa and Nakuru; and two branches in Nairobi. It also has branches in Dar es Salaam, Tanzania. In June 2014, the company was rated "A-, with Stable Outlook", by Global Credit Rating Company of South Africa.

- Note: US$1.00 = KSh 100.24 on 10 April 2016

== Ownership ==
The shares of First Assurance Kenya Limited are privately held. The shareholding in the stock of the company is illustrated in the table below:

First Assurance Kenya Limited stock ownership
Rank	Name of owner	Percentage ownership
1	Barclays Life Assurance Kenya	63.3
2	First Assurance Investment	
3	Syndicate nominees	
	Total	100.00

== See also ==
- List of banks in Kenya
- List of insurance companies in Kenya
- Economy of Kenya
