= Harlequin Watford =

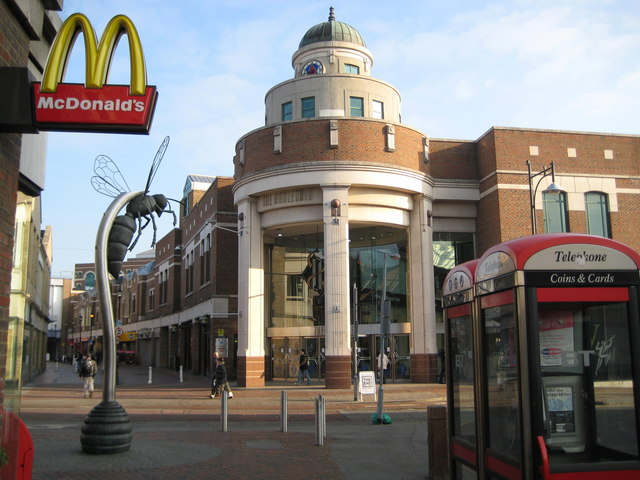
- Location: Watford, Hertfordshire, England
- Coordinates: 51°39′19″N 0°23′39″W
- Opened: 1992
- Previous names: The Harlequin; Intu Watford; Atria Watford
- Developer: Intu Properties
- Manager: Michael Stevens
- Owner: SGS UK Retail (93%), Watford Borough Council (7%)
- Architect: Chapman Taylor Partners
- Num. of stores: Over 145
- Floor area: 107,000 m^{2} (1,150,000 sq ft)
- Floors: 7 (inc. Parking)
- Parking: 2050 + 3000 (Watford Council) in Watford
- Website: https://harlequinwatford.com

Harlequin Watford is a shopping centre in the middle of Watford, Hertfordshire, England. It opened in June 1992 as the Harlequin Shopping Centre. The centre was rebranded as Intu Watford in 2013 following the renaming of its parent Capital Shopping Centres Group as Intu Properties. It was renamed to Atria Watford in March 2021 by the new owners, Global Mutual. Atria Watford was renamed back to the Harlequin (although under the name Harlequin Watford) on 3 July 2025.

The building is glass roofed with symmetrical malls. The anchor stores of the centre were branches of John Lewis (known as Trewins until rebranding in 2001) and Debenhams, until their closure in 2020. Apple Store, Marks & Spencer, Zara and Next continue to operate in the centre.

== History ==
In 1962 there were discussions about development of the site with the plans including a ten-pin bowling alley and 130 flats.

The Sainsbury's store on Queen's Road was bought and demolished (1983) to create space for the centre and a warehouse. During the development of the centre, listed high street buildings were renovated and Queen's Road was maintained as a pedestrian cross route through the town.

The shopping centre was named and opened by Harlequin Enterprises Ltd (founded 1987, dissolved 2000) in 1990. The name was a winning entry to a local competition; according to the Watford Observer, the name was probably a reference to the nearby railway line, at the time branded the "Harlequin line" as it passed through Harlesden and Queen's Park.

Watford Council extended a resident parking permit scheme in 1996 to deal with the parking congestion that had arisen since the opening of the centre.

Intu Properties purchased the adjoining Charter Place shopping centre from Watford Borough Council in April 2013. Planning permission was granted in 2014 for Charter Place to be demolished, to make way for a new mixed-use scheme which comprises 16 retail units, a new department store, 11 restaurants and a 9 screen Cineworld cinema, one of which is a high definition IMAX, which will be integrated into the main Intu Watford centre. Demolition work began in November 2015. On 27 September 2018 Debenhams opened a new 86,000 sq ft store in the extension, featuring its first redesigned beauty hall. The 400,000 sq ft extension has increased the total size of the shopping centre to 1.15 million sq ft, making it number 12 in the list of the UK biggest retail destinations.

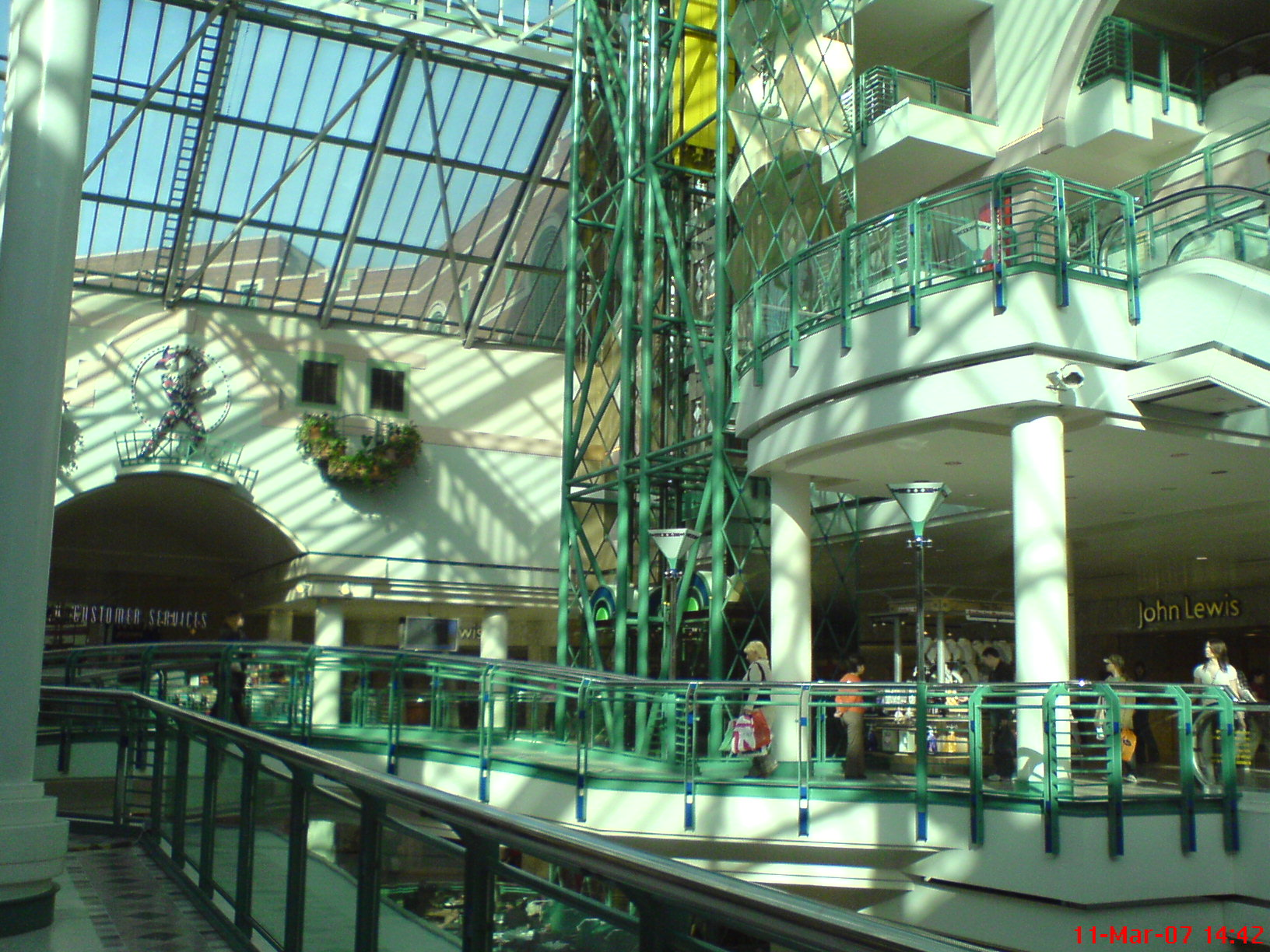
The open plan mall of the Harlequin, in the year 2007

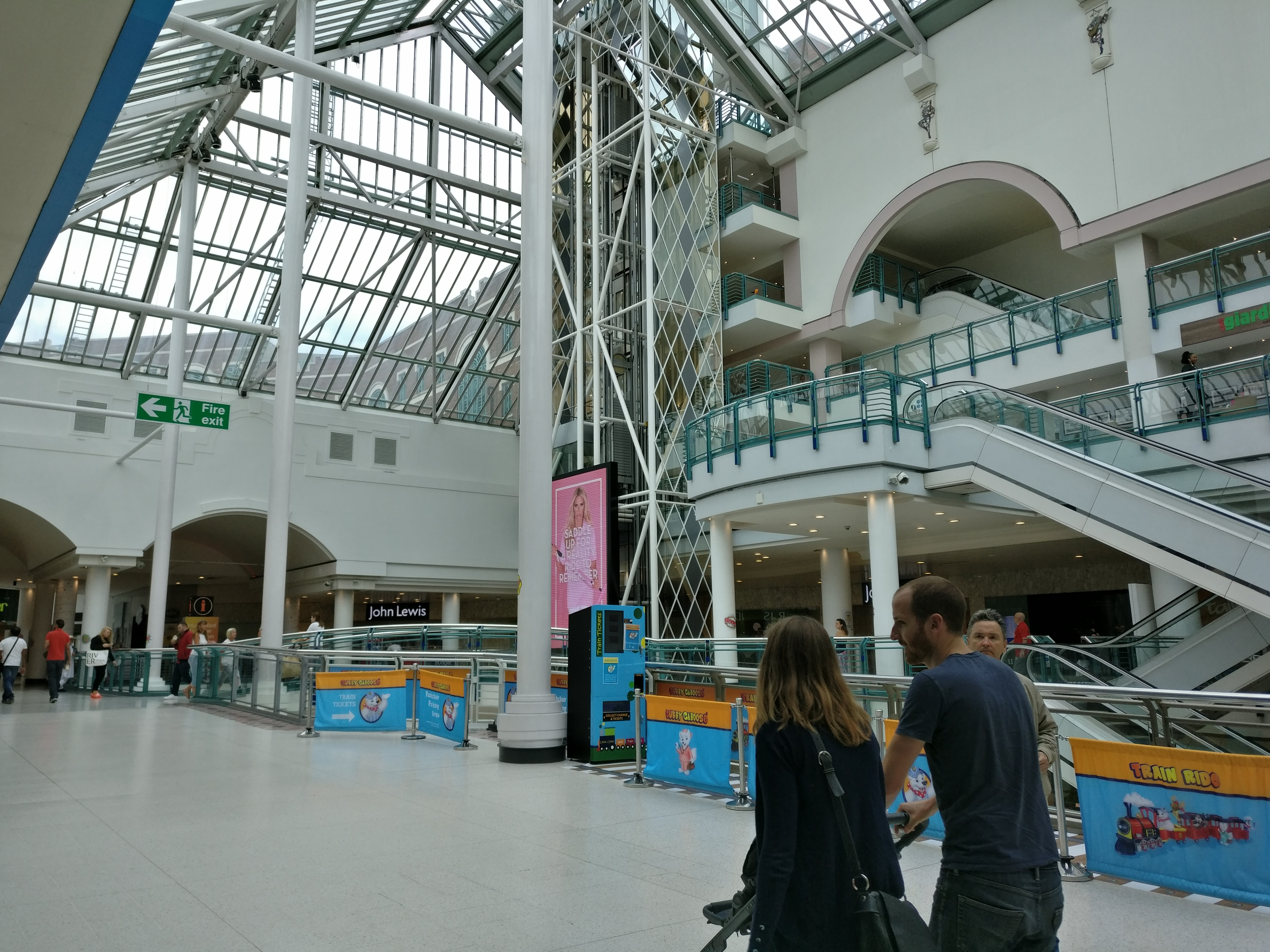
The same area in 2016

Following Intu Properties plc entering administration in June 2020, a subsidiary of the company called Intu SGS received funding to take full control of the centre along with Lakeside, Victoria Centre and Braehead. The transfer from Intu to Intu SGS is expected to take place by the end of 2020, and will involve Global Mutual becoming asset manager of the centres and Savills serving as property manager.

On 4 March 2021, new owners Global Mutual announced the renaming of the centre to atria Watford. It is named after the skylights spanning its roof. This announcement caused controversy, with calls to revert the name to the Harlequin.

The shopping centre was officially renamed Harlequin Watford on 3 July 2025.
