= Alewyn Burger =

South African banker

- Born: 1951 (age 74–75)
- Education: University of South Africa
- Occupation: CRO
- Employer: Standard Bank (former COO)

Alewyn Burger (born 1951) is a South African banker and former chief operating officer of Standard Bank. He has a PhD in mathematics from the University of South Africa and attended Harvard Business School's six-week Advanced Management Program (1991).

He semi-retired from his position at Standard Bank in 2011 and currently acts as an advisor for PwC and SAP. He also teaches as a visiting professor at the University of Stellenbosch Business School.

== Academic life and early career ==
His studies started at the Rand Afrikaans University in Johannesburg where he received an MSc degree in mathematical statistics in 1974 and subsequently earned a PhD in mathematical statistics at the University of South Africa in 1981. In 1991 he completed an Advanced Management Program (AMP) at Harvard Business School.

- Advanced Management Program at Harvard Business School 1991
- Advanced Executive program (AEP) at University of South Africa 1986
- Received a MSc at the Rand Afrikaans University 1974

== ABSA Bank merger ==
Burger had a key position during the Absa Bank Group merger between 1992 and 1997, which included amalgamating United Bank, Allied Bank, the Volkskas Group as well as the Sage Group. Burger was instrumental in integrating the IT systems into a single integrated operation, and transforming the organization from a product silo structure to a more customer centric.

== Current and previous directorships ==
- 1999-2001 Frankling (Pty) Ltd Investment company.
- 1997-1998 Absa Bank Group Member of group board. Responsible for cards and electronic banking, Commercial banks, ABSA Direct, Group operations, Electronic Commerce and Group R&D
- United Building Society 1979–1991
  - United Group Executive Director, accountable for all operations, research and technology services.
  - United Building Society. General Manager for IT, Research and Management Services divisions
  - Deputy General Manager, IT and Research Department
  - Assistant General Manager for the IT Division
  - Head Office Manager of Applications Programming, IT Division
  - Manager of the Research department
- 1974-1980 SA Defence Force in the DISA unit. Work relating to Statistics and Operations Research.
- Standard Bank

Board and advisory positions

- Absa Bank Group
  - Commercial Bank Divisional Board
  - Corporate Bank Divisional Board
  - Financial Services
  - Private Banking and Investment Services
  - Bankfin
  - Cortal Direct
- SA Banking Council (representing ABSA)
- Global Access SA
- Destiny Electronic Commerce (JV with Naspers: Chairman)
- Smartec Technonologies (JV with Franklin: Chairman)
- Payments Association of SA (Chairman 1996–1998)
- Transwitch Services, Easypay (JV with Pick ‘n Pay: Chairman 1996–1998)
- Visa International Regional Board (Representing ABSA)
- MasterCard Regional Board for Middle East and Africa (representing ABSA)
- Maestro Global Board (representing ABSA)

== Awards and recognitions ==
- ICT Industry Leader of the year 2005
- IT personality of the year in South Africa 2003
- Finalist in South African National Boss of the year competition 1998

He is married and has three children.
