= The Glades (Bromley) =

Coordinates: 51.4042°N 0.0168°E

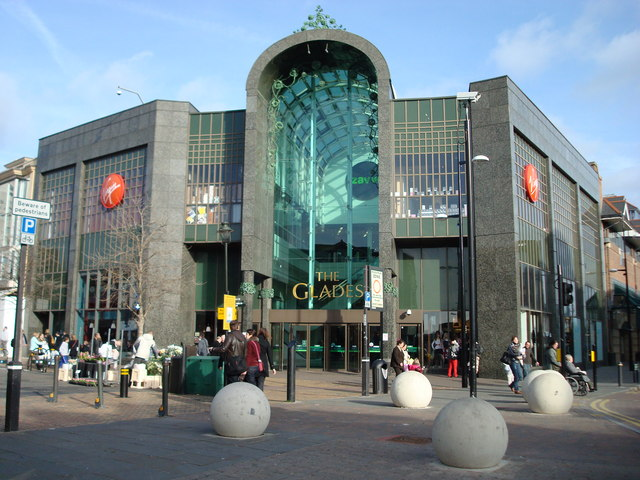
- Location: Bromley, Greater London, England
- Opened: 22 October 1991; 35 years ago
- Owner: Alaska Permanent Fund (85%), London Borough of Bromley (15%)
- Num. of stores: 135
- Num. of anchor tenants: 4
- Floor area: 464,000 sq ft (43,100 m^{2})
- Floors: 2 shopping, 2/4 car parking, 1 service
- Parking: 1,420 spaces
- Website: www.theglades.co.uk

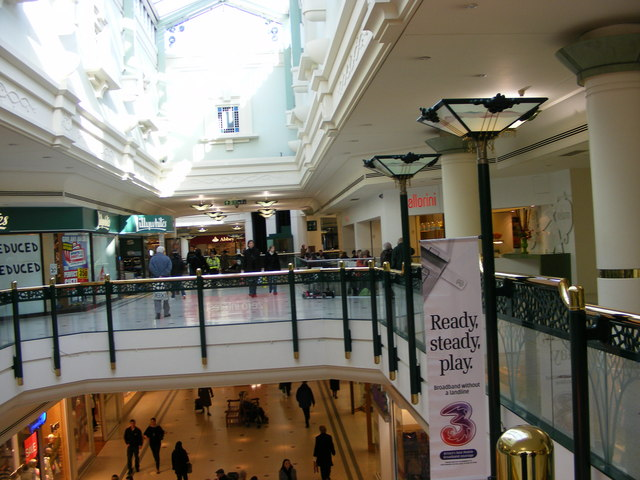
Interior of the centre

The Glades is a shopping centre in Bromley, England. It has a total of 135 stores trading from a combined floorspace of 464,000 sq ft (43,100 m^{2}). Opened as The Glades on Tuesday 22 October 1991, the centre is currently jointly owned by Alaska Permanent Fund (85%) and the London Borough of Bromley (15%). In October 2015 it was confirmed that Alaska Permanent Fund Corporation had agreed to acquire the stakes held by intu Properties and CGNU/Aviva in a £177m deal, giving the APFC 85% holding of the mall (Bromley Council retained its 15% share) and taking the Bromley centre out of intu's network. The sale completed towards the end of 2016.

The name "The Glades" was chosen following a competition in which Bromley residents were asked for suggestions. "The Glades" was chosen reflecting the history of Bromley as a wooded area. The centre was rebranded as Intu Bromley in the summer of 2013 following the renaming of parent Capital Shopping Centres Group plc as Intu Properties plc. Following intu Properties' sale of the centre, the intu branding and name was withdrawn from the centre, bringing back its original name.

== Stores ==
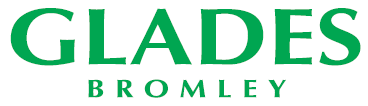
Former logo of The Glades

Major stores within the centre include Marks & Spencer (also opening onto Bromley High Street), Boots, Waterstones, Zara, H&M, David Clulow, New Look, Superdrug, and Apple Store. In all, there are 135 stores within The Glades.

The Glades also includes Regent Arcade, a parade of small boutique shops which runs from Elmfield Road near the street entrance to the former site of Debenhams and links in to the lower mall beneath Waterstones.

=== Extension at main entrance ===
Building began in Autumn 2006 on a £25 million extension close to the main entrance of the centre. The development involved the demolition of two buildings on the high street and several existing units within The Glades.

=== River Island (unit 85/86) mezzanine extension ===
In 2009 the mezzanine floor which was only staff and stock rooms above unit 86 was extended into empty space above unit 85. The menswear was moved to the mezzanine. The staff room was moved to the ground floor.

=== The Restaurant Terrace ===
Work was completed in July 2016 on a new extension to the centre to house 5 new restaurants including Wagamama, Byron Hamburgers, Giraffe World Kitchen and Ed's Easy Diner. Project Pie, a pizza restaurant in the Restaurant terrace closed within months of opening and remains closed.
