= Sanlam Allianz Holdings Kenya Plc =

- Formerly: List: Indo Africa Insurance Co. Ltd Pan Africa Insurance Co Pan Africa Insurance Holdings Ltd Sanlam Kenya plc
- Company type: Public; NSE: SLAM
- Industry: Insurance, financial services
- Founded: 26 October 1946; 79 years ago
- Headquarters: SanlamAllianz Tower; Nairobi, Kenya
- Key people: John Simba, chairman Mugo Kibati, group CEO
- Products: Insurance and asset management
- Revenue: ▲KES: 7.36 billion (2024)
- Net income: ▲KES: 1.05 billion (2024)
- Total assets: ▲KES: 39.17 billion (2024)
- Total equity: ▲KES: 1.92 billion (2024)
- Website: Homepage

Sanlam Allianz Holdings (Kenya) Plc is an insurance, investment and retirement group based in Kenya.

== Overview ==
The Group's headquarters are located in Nairobi, Kenya, with subsidiaries and associates in Kenya. Sanlam Allianz Holdings Kenya plc is a member of the Sanlam Group, a South African JSE listed financial services group with business interests in Africa, Europe, India, the United States, Australia and South East Asia.

== History ==
Sanlam Kenya plc was founded on 26 October 1946 as the Indo Africa Insurance Company Limited and began writing life insurance business in 1947. In 1963, the Company became the first insurance company to list its shares on the Nairobi Securities Exchange. In the same year, the company name was changed to Pan Africa Insurance Company to reflect its broader ownership base.

In 2000, Pan Africa Insurance Company Limited entered into a strategic partnership with African Life Assurance of South Africa. This was through an acquisition of a minority stake in Pan Africa Insurance Holdings Limited by Hubris Holdings Limited, African Life Assurance investment vehicle.

With the aim of creating more focus and facilitate management specialization with resultant improvement in productivity, efficiency and customer service, Pan Africa Insurance Company Limited commenced a restructure of its business units in 2002. The Company transferred its long term and life Insurance to Pan Africa Life Assurance Limited and its short term general insurance to Pan Africa General Insurance Limited. Pan Africa Insurance Company Limited then changed its name to Pan Africa Insurance Holdings Limited to reflect its present role as a holding Company of the two wholly owned subsidiaries.

In 2004, the short-term insurance business of Pan Africa General Insurance Limited was merged with that of Apollo Insurance Company Limited. This led to the formation of APA Insurance. Due to this merger, Pan Africa General Insurance Limited was renamed PA Securities Limited and held 39.97% shareholding in APA Insurance Limited. This investment in APA Insurance limited was disposed by the group in 2011.

The group became part of the Sanlam Group in 2005, when African Life Assurance was acquired by Sanlam.

On 4 November 2014, Pan Africa Insurance Holdings Limited announced plans to acquire a controlling stake in unlisted Gateway Insurance a move that would see the group re-enter the general insurance market since it disposed its 39.97% stake in APA Insurance.

In August 2016, Pan Africa Insurance Holdings Limited rebranded to Sanlam Kenya plc. In December 2021, The Sanlam Group entered into discussions with Allianz for the merger of the operations of entire group in Africa except South Africa. Following the group reorganization and a successful rights issue, group changed its name to Sanlam Allianz Holdings Kenya Plc.

== Subsidiaries and investments ==
The companies that comprise Sanlam Allianz Holdings Kenya Plc include:

=== Current investments ===
- Sanlam Allianz Life Insurance Limited – 100% shareholding, offering life insurance. Formerly known as Pan Africa Life Assurance Limited.
- Sanlam Securities Limited – 100% shareholding – investment arm of the group. Previously known as Pan Africa General Insurance Limited. Pan Africa Securities was a result of restructuring and merger of the group's general insurance business with that of Apollo Insurance Company Limited through the sale and transfer of their respective assets and liabilities to APA Insurance Limited. Pan Africa thus acquired a 39.97% shareholding in APA Insurance Limited and retained its non-general insurance business. PA securities disposed its shareholding in APA in 2011.
- Mae Properties Limited – 100% shareholding – Real Estate company, held through PA Securities Limited.
- Chem Chemi Mineral Water Limited – 100% shareholding – water bottling company, held through PA Securities Limited.
- Runda Water Limited – 24.90% shareholding – water distribution in Runda Estate, held through Mae Properties.

=== Former investments ===
- Sanlam Allianz General Insurance – 71.86% shareholding – offering short-term insurance.
- Sanlam Investment Management (Kenya) Limited – 100% shareholding – investment and portfolio managers.

== Ownership ==
The shares of the Sanlam Allianz Holdings Kenya are traded on the Nairobi Securities Exchange, under the symbol: SLAM. As of 31 December 2024, the shareholding in the group's stock was as depicted in the table below:

Sanlam Kenya plc Stock Ownership
Rank	Name of Owner	Percentage Ownership
1	Hubris Holdings Limited	57.14
2	Patel Baloobhai Chhotabhai	21.04
3	Other Local and International Investors	21.82
	Total	100.00

== Governance ==
Sanlam Allianz Holdings Kenya plc is governed by John P N Simba as the Chairman of the group and Patrick Tumbo as the CEO.

== See also ==
- List of Insurance companies in Kenya
- Nairobi Securities Exchange
- Sanlam
