= List of insurance companies in Kenya =

This is a list of notable Insurance Companies carrying on insurance business in Kenya. They are regulated by the Insurance Regulatory Authority:

- Allianz
- Britam Holdings T/A British-American Insurance Company Kenya Limited, and as Real Insurance Company
- CIC Insurance Group
- First Assurance Kenya Limited
- I&M Holdings Limited T/A GA Insurance Company
- Jubilee Insurance Company Limited
- Kenya Reinsurance Corporation
- Liberty Kenya Holdings Limited T/A Heritage Insurance Company
- Liberty Life Assurance Kenya Limited
- Momentum Group Limited T/A Metropolitan Life Insurance Kenya, and as Cannon Assurance Company Limited
- Old Mutual Holdings - formerly UAP Holdings
- Sanlam Allianz Holdings Kenya Plc – formerly Pan Africa Life Assurance

== See also ==
- Insurance Regulatory Authority
- Nairobi Securities Exchange
- Economy of Kenya
