= SnapScan =

South African fintech

- Type: Private
- Industry: Fintech
- Founded: 2013; 13 years ago
- Founder: Kobus Ehlers; Malan Joubert
- Headquarters: Cape Town, South Africa
- Products: POS systems
- Brands: SnapCode
- Services: Payment facilitation Payment wallet Merchant portal
- Owner: Standard Bank, via Firepay (majority shareholding)
- Website: snapscan.co.za

Screenshot of the mobile wallet section of the SnapScan app

SnapScan is a South African fintech company and mobile payment platform. It was originally developed as a QR code payment system (SnapCode), whereby users could scan a merchant's QR in the SnapScan app to authorize a payment. The company has subsequently expanded into online payments and other merchant tools.

Headquartered in Cape Town, the company was founded in 2013, making it one of South Africa's early mobile payment applications. It is owned by Firepay, which itself is majority owned by major South African financial institution Standard Bank.

As of 2026, SnapScan has partnered with over 60,000 merchants across SA.

== History ==
In 2006, Cape Town-based mobile security startup FireID was founded by Justin Stanford and xxxxx, with Johann Rupert's Reinet Investments as its original funder.

In 2011, Reinet withdrew funding in FireID, 40 employees were retrenched, and the company was closed. Co-founder Justin Stanford stated that long lead times between sales resulted in the company not bringing in enough cash revenue to continue operating.

However, shortly thereafter, one of FireID's cofounders, Malan Joubet, negotiated a management buyout and repositioned the company as an tech incubator. The original security business was spun off as FireID Security. Also in 2011, FireID Payments (FirePay) was registered as its own legal entity, under the FireID umbrella.

FirePay conceptualized SnapScan mobile payments, and launched SnapScan in 2013, in partnership with South Africa's largest commercial bank by annual revenue, Standard Bank. At the time, it was one of six startups in the FireID incubator.

Also in 2013, SnapScan won Best App of the Year at the MTN MTN Business App of the Year Awards. MTN stated that it gave SnapScan the award due to the team demonstrating a solid passion for application development, and showed innovation and an understanding of what a user really wants from a mobile app.

In March 2014, after a beta testing period, Standard Bank announced in a press release that the SnapScan app had officially launched to the public.

In 2016, South African financial institution Standard Bank acquired a majority shareholding in SnapScan's parent company, Firepay, for an undisclosed amount. Standard Bank confirmed that the app would not be limited to its own customers. The SnapScan team remained on to continue developing the app. At the time, the company had partnered with over 32,000 South African merchants.

In 2023, SnapScan extended their partnership with Standard Bank to develop SnapStore Pro, a point-of-sale machine that combines NFC, SnapCode, and card payments.

== Operations ==
As of August 2026, services offered by SnapScan include QR-based payments (SnapCode), online payments, SnapStore Pro POS systems, Bill payments, donations, a SnapScan wallet for stored funds, a SnapStore merchant mobile app, a merchant portal with transaction reconciliation, and Payment APIs.

SnapScan has partnered with over 67,000 merchants across South Africa, as of 2024. Major partnered companies include Superbalist, Quicket, One Day Only, Pathcare, Yuppiechef, Bootlegger Coffee Company, Vida e Caffè, Burger King SA, DStv, and Engen Petroleum.

== See also ==
- Cape Town tech industry
- Banking in South Africa
- Economy of South Africa
