= Stanbic IBTC Holdings =

Nigerian financial services company

Stanbic IBTC Holdings PLC
- Type: Public Company; NGX: STANBIC
- Industry: Financial services
- Founded: 1989
- Headquarters: Stanbic IBTC Towers, Walter Carrington Crescent, Victoria Island, Lagos State, Nigeria
- Key people: Chukwuma (Chuma) Nwokocha; Chief executive officer Wole Adeniyi; Chief executive officer - Stanbic IBTC Bank; Bunmi-Dayo Olagunju; Deputy chief executive officer - Stanbic IBTC Bank; Olumide Oyetan; Chief executive officer - Stanbic IBTC Pension Managers
- Products: Loans, savings, investments, debit and credit cards, mortgages, insurance, asset managements, business advisory, pensions, stockbroking, financial technology and financial advisory services
- Revenue: NGN 355.16 billion (2023)
- Total assets: NGN 5.15 trillion (as at 31 December, 2023)
- Number of employees: Over 4,200 (2020)
- Parent: www.standardbank.com
- Rating: AAA (nga) National Long Term Rating by Fitch
- Website: www.stanbicibtc.com

Stanbic IBTC Holdings, commonly referred to as Stanbic IBTC, is a financial service holding company in Nigeria with subsidiaries in banking, stock brokerage, investment advisory, asset management, investor services, pension management, trustees, insurance brokerage and life insurance businesses. The company's newly opened corporate headquarters, Stanbic IBTC Towers, is situated at Walter Carrington Crescent, Victoria Island, Lagos. Stanbic IBTC Holdings is a member of the Standard Bank Group, a financial services giant based in South Africa. Standard Bank is Africa's largest banking group ranked by assets and earnings, with operations in 20 African countries and 13 countries outside Africa.

== Overview ==
Stanbic IBTC Holdings Plc. began as the result of a merger between Stanbic Bank Nigeria Limited and IBTC Chartered Bank Plc. in 2007, then adopting a holding company structure in 2012 to comply with the revised regulatory framework advised by the Central Bank of Nigeria (CBN), requiring banks to either divest from non-core banking financial services or adopt a holding company structure.

=== Before the merger ===
==== IBTC Chartered Bank Plc. ====
Investment Banking & Trust Company Plc (IBTC) was formed as an investment bank on 2 February 1989 with Atedo N.A. Peterside as the chief executive officer and A. Olawale Edun as an executive director.

In 2005, the Central Bank of Nigeria announced its re-capitalization program for commercial banks. This meant that all commercial banks had to have a NGN 25 billion minimum capital base. This CBN order led to the merger of Investment Banking and Trust Company (IBTC) with Chartered Bank Plc and Regent Bank Plc on 19 December 2005 to form IBTC Chartered Bank Plc with a total asset base of NGN 125 billion and listed on the Nigerian Stock Exchange.

==== Stanbic Bank Nigeria Limited ====
Stanbic Bank Nigeria Limited was founded in 1991 when Standard Bank Investment Corporation (Stanbic Bank), acquired the African operations of ANZ Grindlays Bank. The name was later changed to Stanbic Bank Nigeria Limited, and it was a wholly owned subsidiary of Stanbic Africa Holdings Limited (SAHL).

=== Merger ===
On 24 September 2007, IBTC Chartered Bank Plc merged with Stanbic Bank Nigeria Limited. Stanbic Africa Holdings Limited (SAHL) on behalf of Standard Bank tendered an offer for the acquisition of additional IBTC shares in order to attain majority shares in the merged business. This resulted in SAHL having a majority shareholding 50.75% up from 33.33% as at the merger date. The business name was subsequently changed to Stanbic IBTC Holdings Plc and resumed trading on the NSE.

== Member companies ==
The companies comprised in Stanbic IBTC Holdings are as follows:

- Stanbic IBTC Bank – commercial bank in Nigeria, serving individuals and businesses, and regulated by the Central Bank of Nigeria
- Stanbic IBTC Pension Managers Limited – a leading pension fund administrator (PFA) in Nigeria
- Stanbic IBTC Asset Management Limited – providing asset management services, incorporated in 1992
- Stanbic IBTC Stockbrokers Limited – providing stock brokerage service
- Stanbic IBTC Trustees Limited – specializes in trusteeship and estate management
- Stanbic IBTC Capital Limited – offers investment banking services
- Stanbic IBTC Insurance Brokers – operates as the insurance brokerage arm of the group; deals more with general insurance, non-life insurance
- Stanbic IBTC Insurance Limited – provides life insurance services
- Stanbic IBTC Nominees – acts as custodian in money market and fixed income securities for the Nigerian market.
- Zest Payment – fintech subsidiary of Stanbic IBTC Holdings Plc

== Ownership ==
The stock of Stanbic IBTC Holdings listed on the NSE, where it trades under the symbol STANBIC. Shareholding in the group's stock is depicted in the table below:

Stanbic IBTC Holdings PLC stock ownership

Rank	Name of owner	Percentage ownership
1	Stanbic Africa Holdings Limited	63.7
2	Others	36.3
	Total	100.00

== Governance ==
The running of Stanbic IBTC Holdings is overseen by a seven-person board of directors (five non-executive and two executive).

The chairman of the Board of Stanbic IBTC Holdings is Sola David-Borha.

== See also ==
- List of banks in Nigeria
- List of banks in Africa
