= Donald Gordon (South African businessman) =

South African businessman

Sir Donald Gordon
- Born: 24 June 1930; Johannesburg, Union of South Africa
- Died: 21 November 2019 (aged 89)
- Education: University of the Witwatersrand, Johannesburg
- Occupations: Businessman, philanthropist
- Children: 3, including Wendy Appelbaum

Sir Donald Gordon (24 June 1930 – 21 November 2019) was a South African-British businessman and philanthropist. He founded Liberty Life Association of Africa in 1957 and Liberty International.

== Career ==
Educated at King Edward VII School in Johannesburg, and then enrolled at the University of the Witwatersrand, Johannesburg where he obtained a BCom degree in Accounting. Thereafter, he completed his articles to be a Chartered Accountant at the firm Kessel Feinstein (now Grant Thornton).

He founded the Liberty Life Association of Africa in 1957 out of which he formed Transatlantic Insurance Holdings, now Liberty International, in 1980.

He was behind the development of Sandton City, one of the most successful shopping centres in the world.

Gordon was a director of the Guardian Royal Exchange Group for 24 years and chaired their South African subsidiary, Guardian National Insurance Company.

== Other interests ==
The Gordon Institute of Business Science (GIBS) in Johannesburg, South Africa was established in January 2000 following a substantial contribution by Donald Gordon and a major investment by the University of Pretoria.

In 2004, Gordon gave the Royal Opera House and Wales Millennium Centre a collective donation of £20 million payable over five years. This is believed to be one of the largest single private donations ever made to the arts in the UK. Sir Donald has had the Grand Tier at the Royal Opera House as well as the main auditorium of the Wales Millennium Centre named after him.

== Awards and recognition ==
At the 2000 Entrepreneur of the Year Awards in London, Gordon received the "Entrepreneur of the Year Special Award for Lifetime Achievement". He received an honorary doctorate of economic science from the University of the Witwatersrand and an honorary doctorate in commerce from the University of Pretoria. In 1968, he was named "Businessman of the Year" by the South African Sunday Times. In 1999, he was named as "The Achiever of the Century in South African Financial Services" by South African Financial Mail.

In 2005 Birthday Honours List, he was awarded a knighthood in recognition of his services to arts and business.

In 2024, at the South African Jewish Board of Deputies' 120th anniversary gala dinner, he was honoured among 100 remarkable Jewish South Africans who have contributed to South Africa. The ceremony included speeches from Chief Rabbi Ephraim Mirvis, and Gordon was honoured among other business figures such as Raymond Ackerman, Sol Kerzner and Barney Barnato.
