= Insurance Regulatory Authority (Kenya) =

Kenyan government authority tasked with regulation of insurance

Insurance Regulatory Authority of Kenya
- IRA

Agency overview
- Formed: 2006
- Preceding agency: Department of Insurance, Ministry of the National Treasury & Planning.
- Jurisdiction: Kenya
- Headquarters: Zep-Re Place, Longonot Road, Upper Hill, Nairobi, Kenya.
- Motto: Bima Bora Kwa Taifa
- Agency executives: Moses Njenga Chege, Chairperson of the Board of Directors.; Godfrey Kimaiyo Kiptum (MBS), Commissioner of Insurance & Chief Executive Officer.
- Parent department: Ministry of the National Treasury and Economic Planning
- Website: www.ira.go.ke

The Insurance Regulatory Authority of Kenya (IRA) is the sole authority charged with regulation and supervision of the insurance industry within the Republic of Kenya, as guided by Section 3 of Kenya's Insurance Act, which establishes the Authority. The Authority ensures legal compliance by insurance/reinsurance and all other insurance-related entities, protects consumers and promotes a high degree of policy security for policyholders.

== History ==
=== Background ===
The regulation of the insurance industry in Kenya was initially based on the UK Companies Act 1960. The Government of Kenya enacted the Insurance Act Kenya CAP 487 in 1985 with the aim of localizing regulation of the insurance business. The newly-enacted legislation established the Department of Insurance within the Ministry of the National Treasury and Planning, headed by a Commissioner of Insurance, to supervise the insurance sector.

=== Creation of IRA ===
The Insurance Act was amended in 2006 in an attempt to promote further efficient regulation of the insurance sector. The Department of Insurance was separated from its parent ministry and established as a body corporate known as the Insurance Regulatory Authority.

With this amendment, not only did the department gain greater independence from bureaucratic hindrances, which improved its efficiency as intended, but the holder of the Commissioner's office gained additional responsibility in the secondary role of serving as the chief executive officer of the newly established authority.

== Functions ==
IRA is responsible for the maintenance of the stability of the insurance sector. Its main objectives and functions are found in the Insurance Act.

== See also ==
- List of Insurance companies in Kenya
- List of financial supervisory authorities by country
