= Intu =

United Kingdom-based real estate investment trust

Intu Properties plc
- Intu logo since 2013
- Trade name: Intu Group
- Formerly: Liberty International plc Capital Shopping Centres Group plc
- Type: Public limited company
- Traded as: LSE: INTU; JSE: ITU
- ISIN: GB0006834344
- Industry: Property
- Founded: 1980; 46 years ago (as Liberty International)
- Founder: Donald Gordon
- Defunct: 26 June 2020; 6 years ago
- Fate: Administration then closure
- Successor: SGS UK Retail (formerly Intu SGS); XPE Group plc (formerly Intu Debenture)
- Headquarters: London, United Kingdom
- Area served: United Kingdom, Spain
- Key people: John Strachan (Chairman); John Whittaker (former Deputy Chairman); Matthew Roberts (former Chief Executive Officer)
- Products: Investment and development of shopping centres and other commercial property
- Revenue: £542.3 million (2019)
- Operating income: £(1,542.7) million (2019)
- Net income: £0 (2020)
- Divisions: Intu List of Properties
- Subsidiaries: Intu SGS

Intu Properties plc was a British real estate investment trust (REIT), largely focused on shopping centre management and development. Originally named Transatlantic Insurance Holdings plc and later Liberty International plc, it changed its name in May 2010 to Capital Shopping Centres Group plc after demerging its Capital & Counties Properties business unit to form an independent business. The company adopted the Intu name on 18 February 2013, and this was followed by the rebranding of most of its shopping centres under the Intu title from May 2013.

The company's shares were listed on the London and Johannesburg stock exchanges until it entered administration in June 2020. The company owned or part-owned 17 shopping centres in the UK and one in Spain prior to entering administration.

== History ==
Former Liberty International logo

The company was established by Sir Donald Gordon in 1980 under the name Transatlantic Insurance Holdings plc as an offshoot of Liberty Life Association of Africa, a business he had founded in 1957. The company developed into a leading investor in life assurance businesses in the 1980s and divested its remaining life assurance interests (a 29% holding in Sun Life) in 1991. In 1992 it merged with Capital & Counties, a leading shopping centre developer, securing itself a listing on the London Stock Exchange. It changed its name to Liberty International in 1996 and, after demerging Capital & Counties Properties in May 2010, renamed itself Capital Shopping Centres Group (CSC).

The company also disposed of a significant holding in its Californian subsidiary Capital and Counties USA, which was acquired by Equity One in May 2010. Equity One was later acquired by Regency Centers Corporation.

In 2011, CSC purchased the Trafford Centre from The Peel Group and offered a 20% stake in CSC to Peel chairman John Whittaker. The 20% stake in CSC was worth approximately £700m at the time, valuing the Trafford Centre at approximately £1.65 billion. Whittaker continued to purchase shares after the takeover and became the largest shareholder in 2012, with a stake of 24.63%.

Former Capital Shopping Centres logo

CSC purchased the Westfield Group's 75% stake in Westfield Broadmarsh in Nottingham in November 2011.

=== Rebrand as Intu ===
In January 2013, CSC announced its rebranding as Intu and the renaming of twelve of its shopping centres to incorporate the new consumer-facing brand. A new orange and black brand identity was introduced at the same time, including a bird logo said to represent a "symbol of joy". At the same time and in response to changing consumer behaviour, Intu launched the UK's first online shopping centre and insourced all shopping centre staff, previously employed by facilities management company Bilfinger Europa.

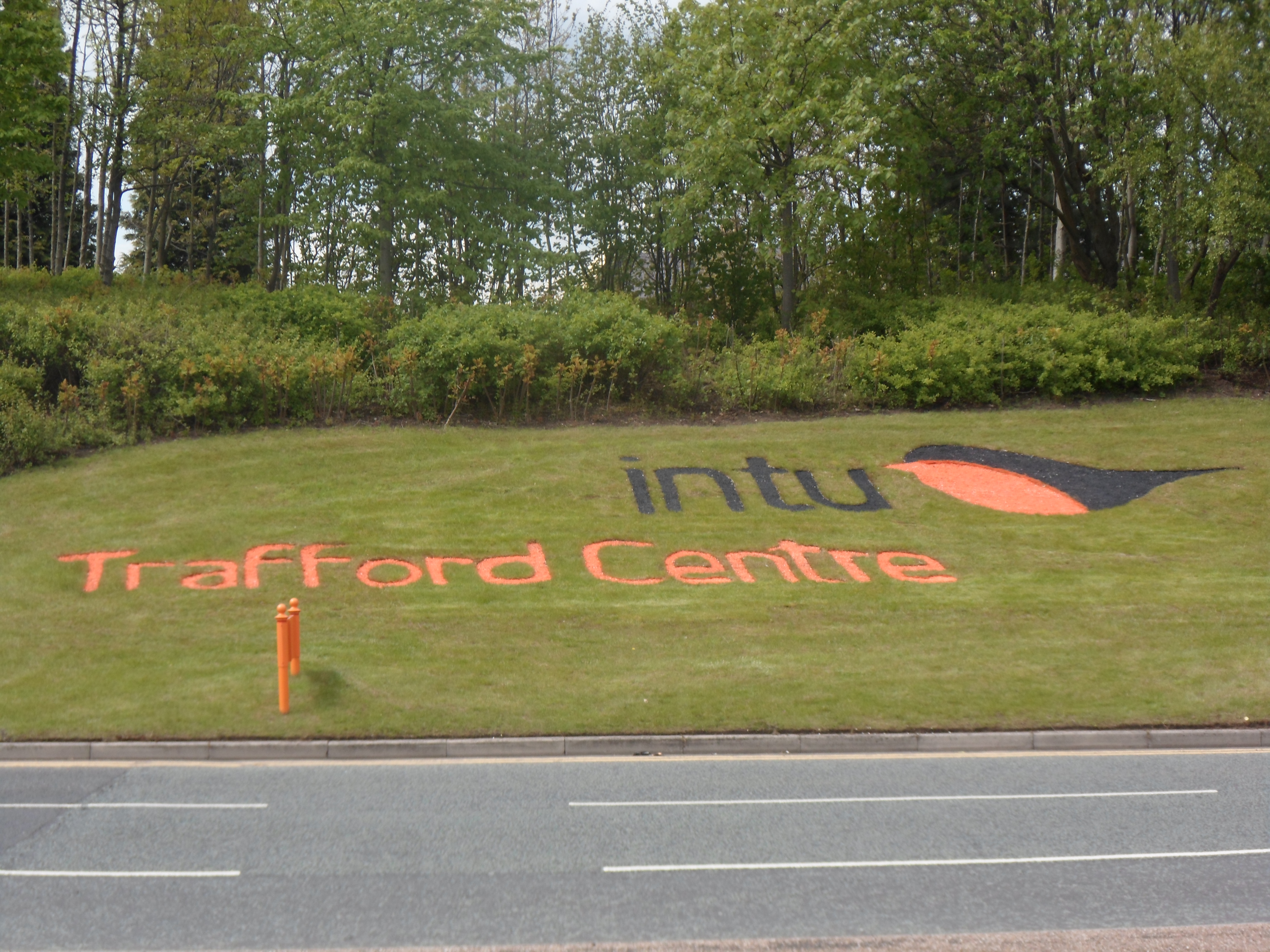
The 2013 logo in landscaped form at Intu Trafford Centre

=== 2013 to 2019 ===
The company announced on 27 February 2013 that it had agreed to purchase Midsummer Place in Milton Keynes from Legal & General for £250.5 million. The sale was completed by the end of March 2013.

In March 2014, Intu announced that it had purchased the Merry Hill Shopping Centre and Westfield Derby for a £867.8m property deal that saw Intu take complete ownership of Westfield's Derby shopping centre and Sprucefield Park in Northern Ireland.

In December 2017, the company agreed to a takeover by property development company Hammerson for £3.4 billion, subject to shareholder approval. In April 2018, Hammerson recommended that its shareholders reject the proposed takeover. With Intu hit by declining footfall on the high street and failures among major retailers, Peel Group, Olayan Group, and Brookfield Property launched a £2.8bn takeover bid in October, but, after due diligence procedures, they withdrew the offer in November 2018.

In November 2019, Intu said it was in talks to sell three Spanish shopping centres: Puerto Venecia in Zaragoza, intu Asturias in Oviedo, and intu Xanadu in Madrid. In December 2019, it sold its share in the Zaragoza asset for €237.7 million, delivering net proceeds of around €115m. The following month it sold its Oviedo asset, raising around €85 million.

=== 2020 demise ===
In March 2020, Intu abandoned a £1.3 billion emergency cash call as not enough investors were willing to support the call. The company had £4.5 billion of debt. The company subsequently warned that it could collapse if unable to raise further funds, after reporting a loss of £2bn for 2019. Intu shares had lost almost 90% of their value in a year, and the results announcement prompted a 25% drop to just over 4p. On 26 March, as the COVID-19 pandemic prompted more retailers to delay rent payments to Intu, the company warned that it would need some waivers from its lenders and was likely to breach its debt covenants in July; its shares fell 11% to 3.6p in the first hour of trading following the warning. On 23 June, the company warned that shopping centres might close if financial restructuring talks with lenders failed, and lined up KPMG as administrators as a "contingency". On 26 June, Intu went into administration.

In August, Intu SGS, a subsidiary of Intu and holding company for Intu Watford, Braehead, Victoria Centre and Lakeside, received funding to take full control of the four centres, appointing Global Mutual as asset manager and Savills as property manager. Intu SGS took full control of the four centres, with Global Mutual & Savills assuming management, in October. In September, the transfers of Intu Derby, Merry Hill, and Milton Keynes to new owners were confirmed. Intu announced that Chapelfield would also be transferred to new owners, although these were not identified.

== Properties ==
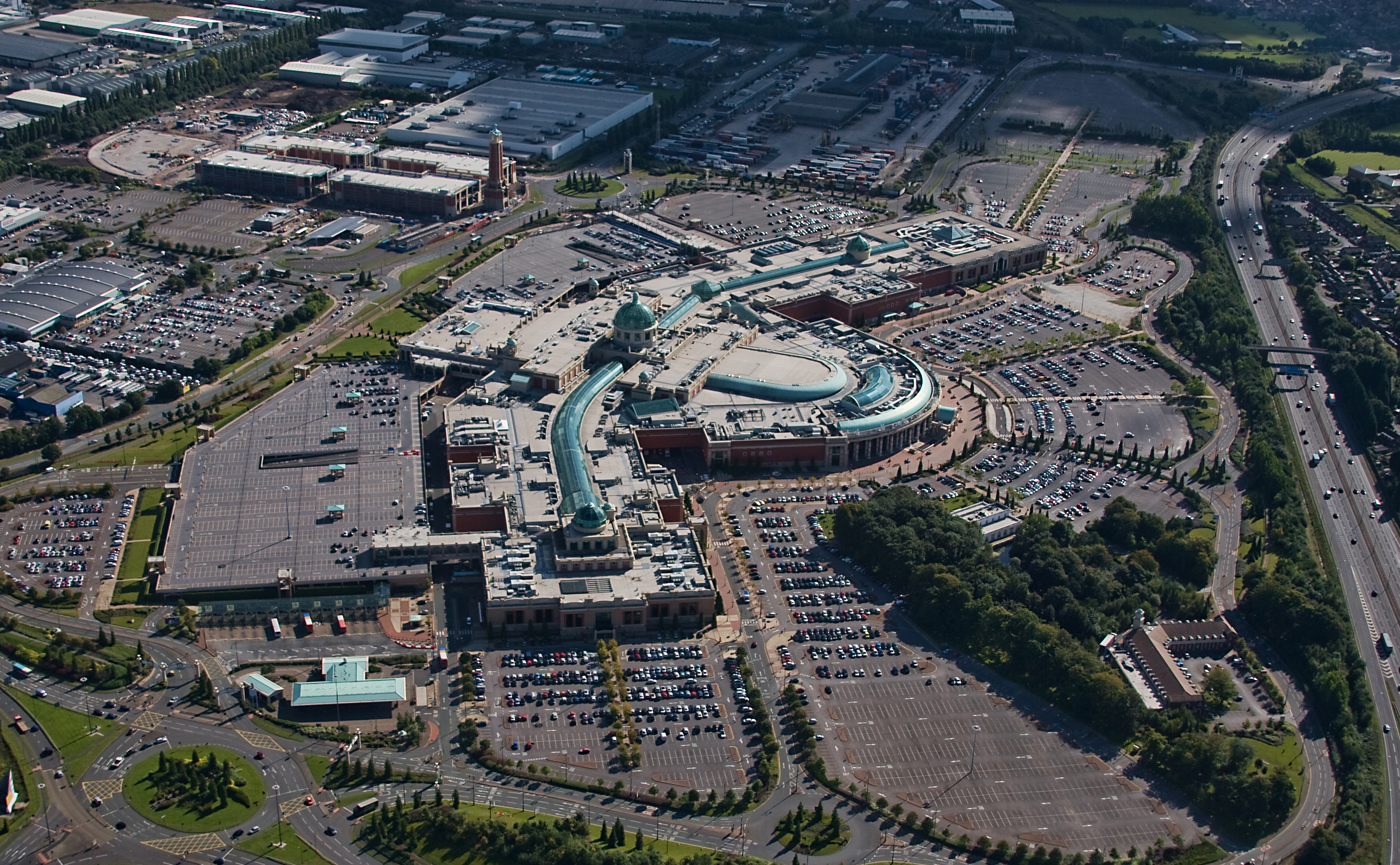
The Trafford Centre was Intu's most valuable asset at £1.66 billion in 2019. Following administration June 2020, Intu's creditors took control in November 2020 forming The Trafford Centre Limited.

As of 31 December 2019 the company's investment properties were valued at £5.9 billion, when Intu owned or part-owned 17 shopping centres in the UK:

Name	Market value (in Pound sterling)	Location	Ownership	Fate
intu Braehead	£288.9m	Renfrew, Renfrewshire (near Glasgow)	Intu 100%	Sale to Intu SGS agreed, renamed Braehead Shopping Centre
intu Broadmarsh	—N/a	Nottingham, Nottinghamshire	Was Intu 70%, Nottingham City Council 30%	Permanently closed its doors before Intu's closure, ownership was handed back to Nottingham City Council.
intu Bromley	£200m	Bromley, Bromley	Was Intu 63.5%, Aviva 21.5%, 15% London Borough of Bromley	Ownership from Intu and Aviva was taken over by Alaska Permanent Fund in late 2016 and was renamed back to The Glades
intu Chapelfield	£106.5m	Norwich, Norfolk	Intu 50%, LaSalle Investment Management 50%	Management taken over by LaSalle Investment Management and mall renamed Chantry Place
Intu Derby	£77.3m	Derby, Derbyshire	Intu 50%, LaSalle Investment Management 50%	50% sold to Cale Street Investments giving them 100% ownership. Mall renamed Derbion
intu Eldon Square	£214.1m	Newcastle, Tyne and Wear	Intu 60%, Newcastle City Council 40%	Management taken over by MAPP and mall renamed Eldon Square
intu Lakeside	£1,000.0m (£1 billion)	West Thurrock, Essex (near London)	Intu 100%	Sale to Intu SGS agreed
intu Metrocentre	£676.8m	Gateshead, Tyne and Wear	Intu 54%, GIC Real Estate 36%, Church Commissioners 10%	Management taken over by Sovereign Centros
intu Merry Hill	£587.6m	Dudley, West Midlands	Intu 100% as of June 2016	Sale to Ellandi agreed
intu Milton Keynes	£212.5m	Milton Keynes	Intu 100%	Sale to Ellandi agreed and mall renamed Midsummer Place
intu Potteries	—N/a	Hanley, Stoke-on-Trent, Staffordshire	Intu 100%	Transferred to MAPP and mall renamed The Potteries Centre
intu Trafford Centre	£1,669.5m (£1.67 billion)	Trafford, Greater Manchester	Intu 100%	Transferred to The Trafford Centre Limited and mall renamed The Trafford Centre
intu Uxbridge	—N/a	Uxbridge, Greater London	Intu 20%, Kumpulan Wang Persaraan 80%	Management transferred to Savills and mall renamed The Chimes
intu Victoria Centre	£201.0m	Nottingham, Nottinghamshire		Sale to Intu SGS agreed
intu Watford	£324.9m	Watford, Hertfordshire	Intu 93%, Watford Borough Council 7%	Sale to Global Mutual and mall renamed atria Watford
The Mall at Cribbs Causeway	£159.3m	Almondsbury, Gloucestershire (near Bristol)	Intu/M&G Real Estate 66%, JT Baylis 34%	Intu share transferred to M&G Real Estate
Manchester Arndale Centre	£309.0m	Manchester, Greater Manchester	Intu/M&G Real Estate 95.3%, Others 4.7%	Intu share transferred to M&G Real Estate
St. David's	£230.0m	Cardiff	Intu 50%, Land Securities 50%	Intu share transferred to Land Securities
intu Xanadú	£233.8m	Madrid, Spain	intu 50%, TH Real Estate 50%	intu 50% to be sold to Northwood by the end of 2020
