= STANLIB =

South African financial services company

- Type: Subsidiary
- Industry: Financial services
- Founded: 2002; 24 years ago
- Headquarters: Johannesburg, Gauteng, South Africa
- Area served: Southern Africa
- Products: Asset management Wealth management
- Total assets: ▲ R804.42 billion (2025)
- Parent: Standard Bank (via Liberty Holdings)
- Website: stanlib.com

STANLIB is a South African asset manager, founded in 2002 and based in Johannesburg. The company is a wholly owned subsidiary of JSE-listed Liberty Holdings Limited, and operates across 4 Southern African countries.

The company was formed in 2002 when Liberty Asset Management (LIBAM) and Standard Corporate and Merchant Bank Asset Management merged. Both of these companies at the time were subsidiaries of Liberty Holdings and Standard Bank respectively.

As of 2025, STANLIB has total assets under management (AUM) of over R804 billion.

== History ==
STANLIB's predecessor was incorporated in 1862 when the Standard Bank of British South Africa was founded in London. It became a South African bank in 1962. Life assurer Liberty Life was founded in 1957. The first unit trust was launched by Guardbank Management Corporation Ltd in 1970.

STANLIB's formation was the result of the amalgamation of seven Standard Bank and Liberty businesses in May 2002. The amalgamation of various unit trust ranges followed in 2004. In June 2006, 15 investment franchises were formed.

In the same year, STANLIB's wealth business was integrated with asset management functions. Later in 2006, a distribution and client support function was established in the UK, in order to offer products suitable for international investors. Operations were expanded to Uganda and Botswana in 1992, Namibia in 1994, and Swaziland and Kenya in 1999. Lesotho followed in 2001.

STANLIB Africa has operated since 1997. Since its inception, STANLIB Africa has secured retail and institutional mandates in 7 countries outside South Africa.

In 2007, Liberty Holdings Limited acquired the remaining 62.6% of STANLIB that it did not already own, acquiring 37.4% from Standard Bank Group and 25.2% from Quantum Leap Investments 740, thereby becoming the sole owner of STANLIB.
