= Liberty Holdings Limited =

South African corporation

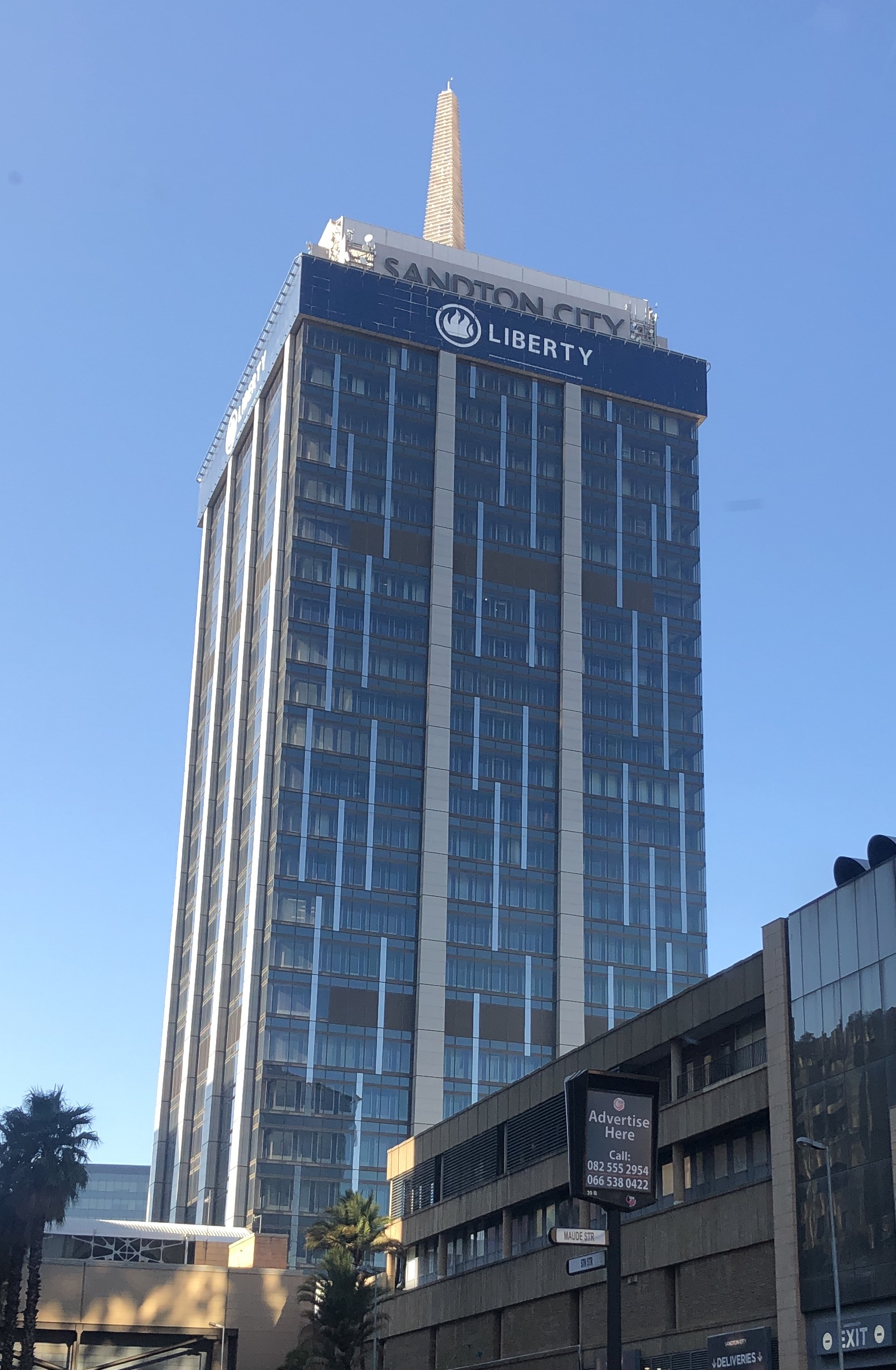
- Liberty logo on a building in Sandton, Gauteng
- Type: Public
- Traded as: JSE: LBH
- ISIN: ZAE000127148
- Industry: Insurance; Asset management
- Founded: September 10, 1957; 69 years ago
- Founder: Sir Donald Gordon
- Headquarters: Johannesburg, Gauteng, South Africa
- Area served: South Africa
- Key people: Yuresh Maharaj (CEO)
- Revenue: ▲ R6.98 billion (2024)
- Net income: ▲ R6.02 billion (2024)
- Total assets: ▲ R12.25 billion (2024)
- Total equity: ▲ R11.57 billion (2024)
- Parent: Standard Bank
- Website: libertyholdings.co.za

Liberty Holdings Limited, also referred to as Liberty, is a South African financial services and property holding company that focuses on insurance and asset management.

Liberty is a wholly owned subsidiary of major South African financial services group Standard Bank, and has operations in 19 countries across Africa.

== History ==
The company was founded in South Africa as the Liberty Life Association of Africa Ltd in 1957, by entrepreneur and philanthropist Sir Donald Gordon.

In 2021, South African financial services group Standard Bank announced its intention to purchase Liberty outright, through a combination of Standard Bank Group shares and cash. At the time, Standard Bank already owned 54% of Liberty's ordinary shares. The deal was subject to shareholder and regulatory approvals.

== See also ==
- Old Mutual
- Standard Bank
