= Standard Bank =

South African bank

Standard Bank Group Limited

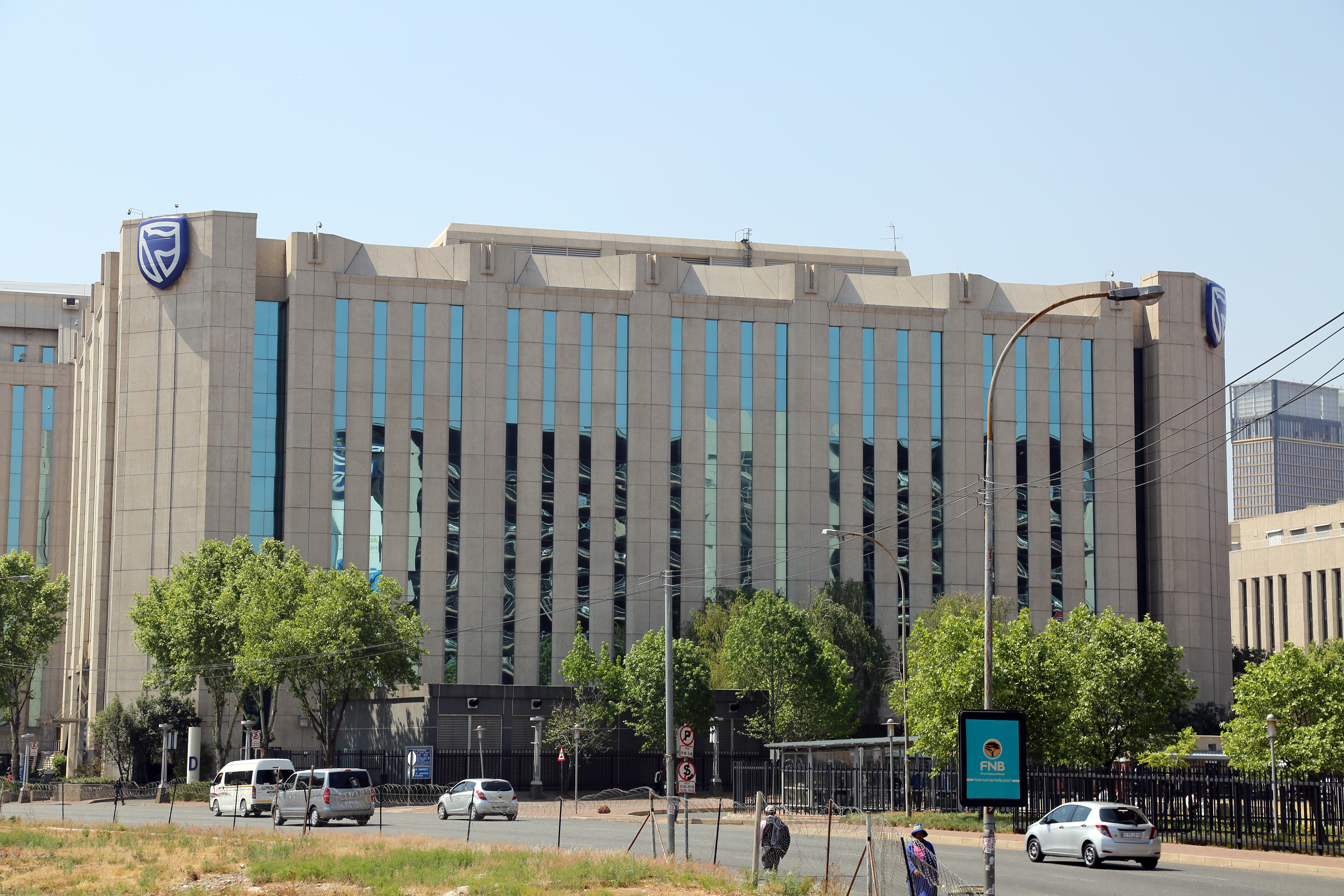
- Headquarters in Johannesburg
- Type: Public
- Traded as: JSE: SBK; LSE: SBK
- ISIN: ZAE000109815 (JSE)
- Industry: Banking
- Founded: 15 October 1862; 164 years ago
- Headquarters: 5 Simmonds Street, Selby South, Johannesburg, South Africa
- Area served: Africa; Asia; Europe; North America; South America
- Key people: Nonkululeko Nyembezi-Heita (Chairperson); Sim Tshabalala (CEO)
- Products: Commercial banking Foreign currency exchange Insurance; Investment banking Investment management Private banking Consumer banking Wealth management
- Net income: ▲ R181 billion (2024)
- AUM: R1.5 trillion (2024)
- Total assets: ▲ R 3.26 trillion (2024)
- Total equity: ▲ R292 billion(2024)
- Number of employees: 54,115 (2024)
- Subsidiaries: SnapScan (via Firepay)
- Website: www.standardbank.com

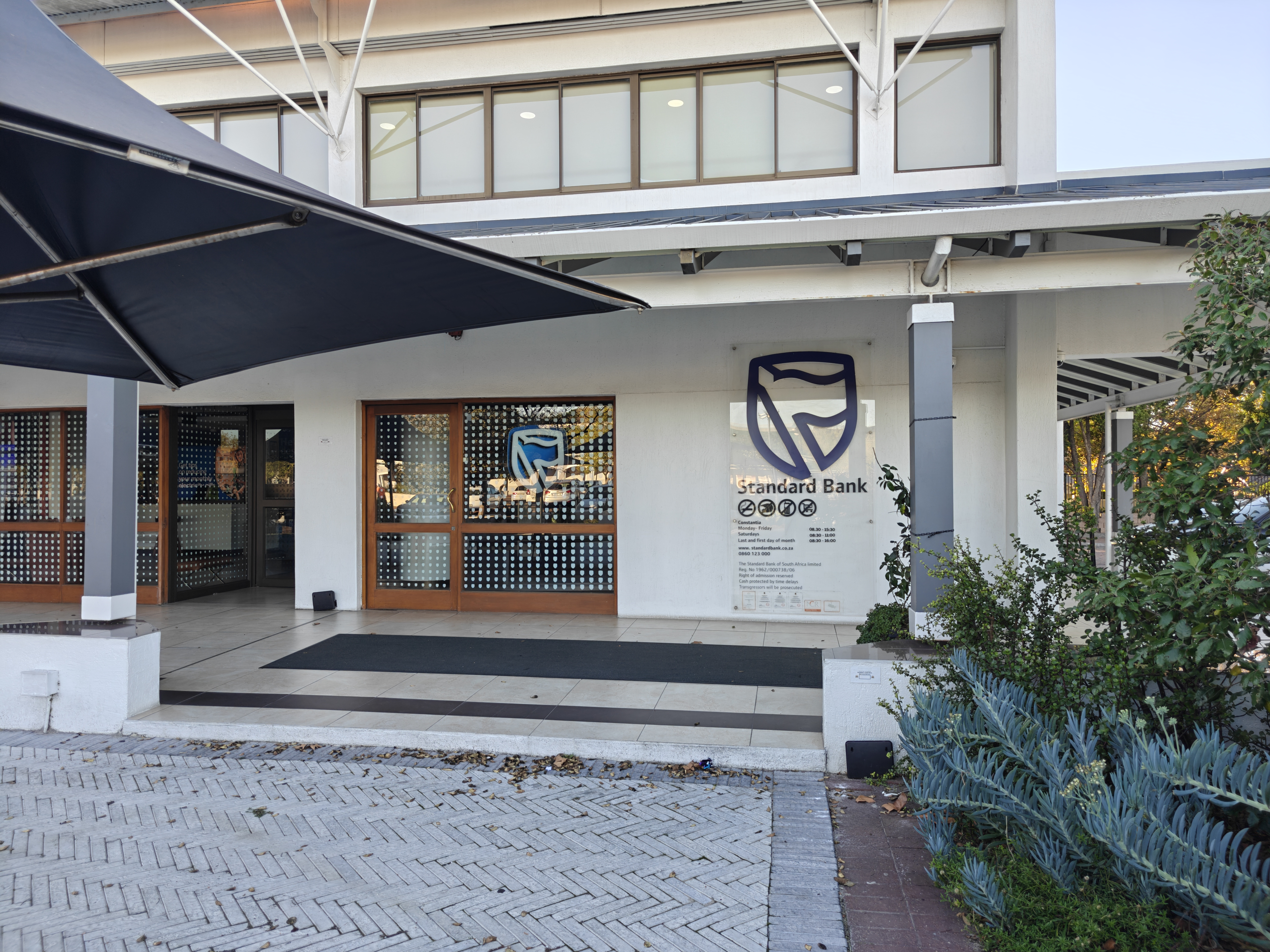
A Standard Bank branch in Cape Town

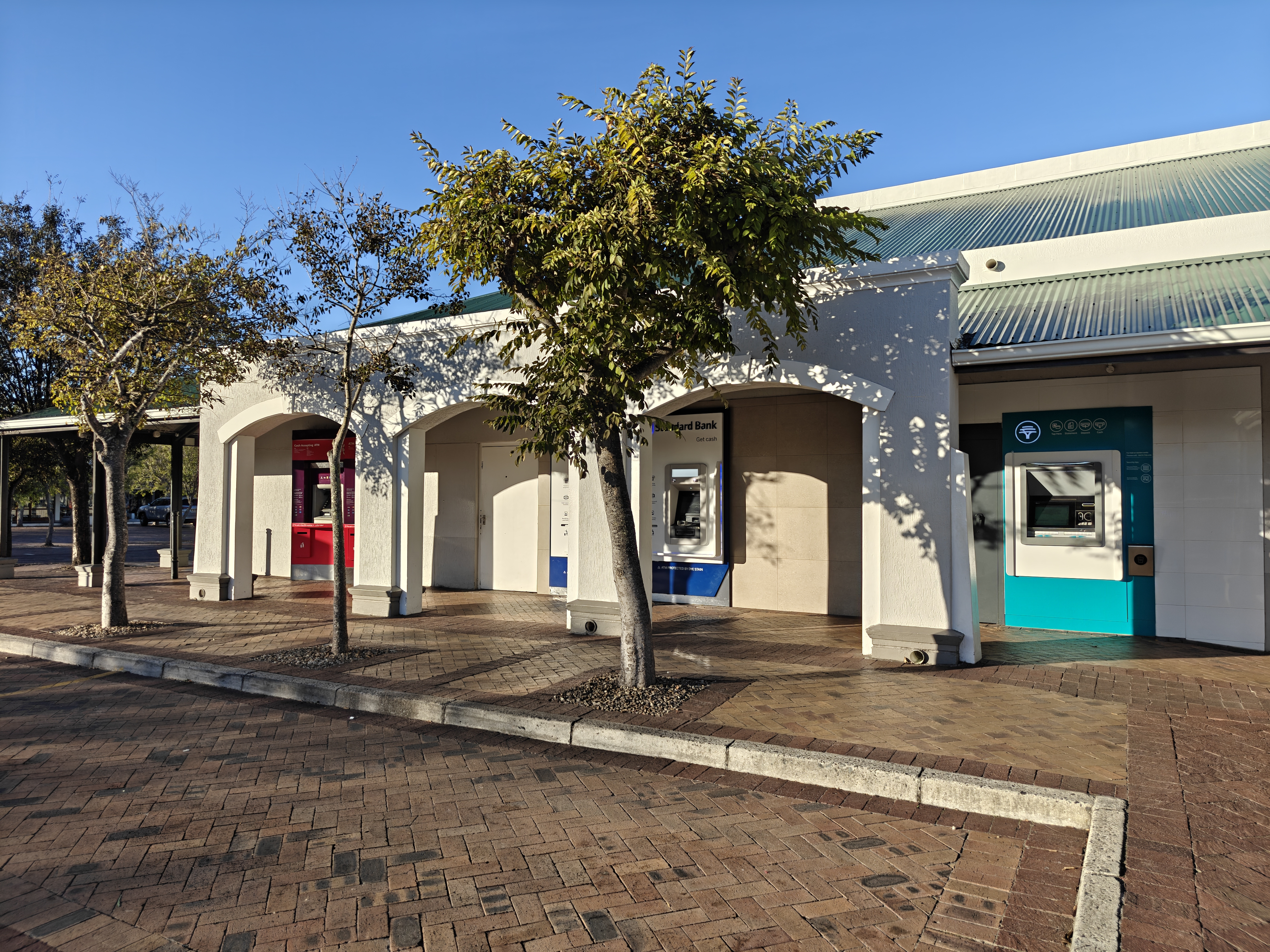
A Standard Bank ATM in between those of competing major South African banks, in Constantia, Cape Town

Standard Bank (officially Standard Bank Group Limited) is the largest bank in Africa, as well as the continent's largest lender by assets, holding a total of R3.8 trillion in assets in 2026.

The company's corporate headquarters, Standard Bank Centre, is located in Johannesburg, Gauteng. The bank has a presence in over 20 Sub-Saharan African countries, 4 global centers, and 2 offshore hubs, for a total of 26 countries of operation.

The bank is also a majority shareholder of Firepay, which itself owns major South African mobile, online, and POS payment platform SnapScan.

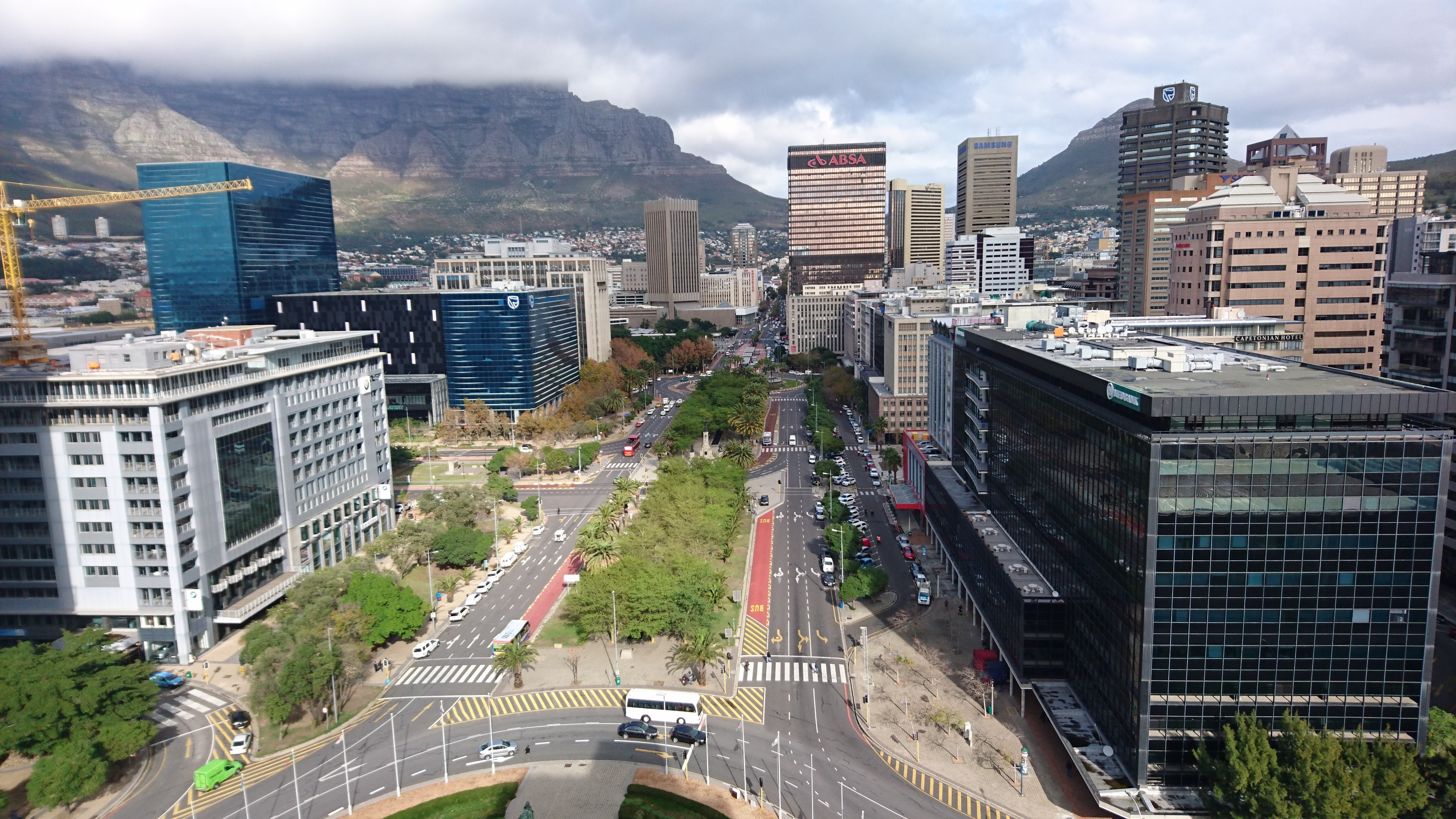
Standard Bank's Western Cape regional office (rear left) in Heerengracht Street, Foreshore, Cape Town

== History ==
The bank now known as Standard Bank was formed in 1862 as a South African subsidiary of the British overseas bank Standard Bank, under the name The Standard Bank of South Africa.

The bank's origins can be traced to 1862, when a group of businessmen led by the prominent South African politician John Paterson formed a bank in London, initially under the name Standard Bank of British South Africa. The bank started operations in 1863 in Port Elizabeth, South Africa, and soon after opening it merged with several other banks including the Commercial Bank of Port Elizabeth, the Colesberg Bank, the British Kaffrarian Bank and the Fauresmith Bank.

It was prominent in financing and development of the diamond fields of Kimberley in 1867. The word "British" was dropped from the title in 1883. When gold was discovered on the Witwatersrand, the bank expanded northwards and on 11 October 1886 the bank started doing business in a tent at Ferreira's Camp (later to be called Johannesburg), thus becoming the first bank to open a branch on the Witwatersrand gold fields. On 1 November 1901 a second branch was opened in Eloff Street of Johannesburg.

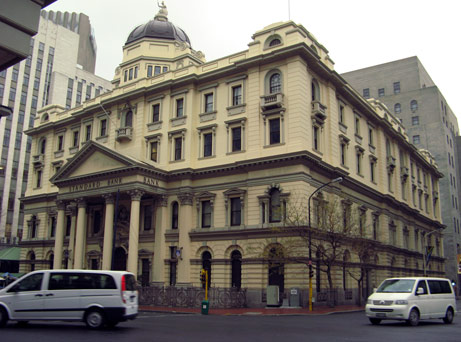
Standard Bank in Adderley Street, Cape Town

Until 1962 the British bank was formally known as the Standard Bank of South Africa, although by then its operations spread across Africa. When the South African operations were formed into a subsidiary in 1962, the parent changed its name to Standard Bank Limited, and the South African subsidiary took its parent's previous name.

In 1967 shares in the Standard Bank of South Africa were offered to the South African public, although the British parent company retained over 80% of the shares.

The parent bank merged in 1969 with Chartered Bank of India, Australia and China and the combined bank became known as Standard Chartered. In 1969 the Standard Bank Investment Corporation (now Standard Bank Group) was established as the holding company of the South African bank.

During the 1970s and 1980s Standard Chartered gradually reduced its shareholding, and sold its remaining 39% stake in Standard Bank Group in 1987, transferring complete ownership of the holding company to South African investors and in particular Liberty Life (and its affiliates), with the latter being the company's major shareholder until 1999.

In 2013, Standard Bank partnered with Cape Town-based fintech FirePay to launch the QR code-based mobile payment app SnapScan.

In 2016, Standard Bank acquired a majority shareholding in SnapScan's parent company, Firepay, for an undisclosed amount. Standard Bank confirmed that the app would not be limited to its own customers.

In March 2019, Standard became the first bank in Africa to shift its operations onto Amazon Web Services. In March 2019, the bank announced a reduction of 91 branches and 1200 staff. The decision was taken due to a growing use of self-service channels and a branch network becoming less relevant.

In July 2021, Standard Bank announced that it would increase its stake in Liberty Holdings, a South African insurance company, from 54% to 100%, for $594 million.

== Operations ==
As of 2024, Standard Bank had a presence in over 20 Sub-Saharan African countries, 4 global centers, and 2 offshore hubs. It held 13% of the top 100 African banks' combined assets, and was its largest bank by total assets, at R3.07 trillion (~ USD 166 billion).

Also in 2024, the bank had 16.1 million personal and private banking clients (4 million of whom used digital banking). In the same year, Standard Bank reported it had 816,000 business and commercial banking clients, across 16 countries. Its client revenue across 20 corporate and investment banking countries was R50.6 billion, and its insurance and asset management division had R1.5 trillion in assets under management.

Standard Bank operated 1,168 branches in 2024, as well 5,562 ATMs. In the same year, it reported that 42% of its senior positions were held by women.

=== South Africa ===
The Standard Bank of South Africa Limited operates Standard Bank Financial Services Holdings Pty Ltd (of which Standard Bank Insurance Brokers Pty Ltd is a subsidiary), Standard Offshore Finance Company Limited Isle of Man, and Diners Club S.A. Pty Ltd.

In 2023, Standard Bank operated 652 branches in its home country of South Africa, with plans to add 33 more.

It offers transactional banking, private banking, savings and investment banking, credit cards, mortgages, vehicle finance, personal loans, and Forex services to South African consumers.

== Expansion and acquisitions ==
=== Africa ===
In 1992 the bank acquired the operations of ANZ Grindlays Bank in eight African countries. Most of the newly acquired banks were renamed Stanbic Bank, to avoid confusion with the former parent (and now competitor), Standard Chartered, which continued to operate in Africa. Several more banks in Africa were acquired during the 1990s, and adopted the Stanbic name. Standard Bank now trades under the name Stanbic Bank in Botswana, the Democratic Republic of the Congo, Ghana, Kenya, Malawi, Nigeria, South Sudan, Tanzania, Uganda, Zambia and Zimbabwe.

==== Eswatini ====
Standard Bank Eswatini opened its doors in 1988 and is today a leading commercial bank in the country.

==== Ivory Coast ====
In February 2014, Standard Bank Group is expected to open a representative office in Abidjan, Ivory Coast, marking the entry of the banking conglomerate into Francophone West Africa. Ivory Coast becomes the 19th African country where Standard Bank maintains a subsidiary.

==== Malawi ====
In December 2001, Standard Bank acquired 60.18% holding in the Commercial Bank of Malawi. The bank was renamed Standard Bank Malawi.

==== Madagascar ====
In Madagascar, the group is represented by Union Commercial Bank.

==== Mozambique ====
Standard Bank SARL ("SBM") has a long history and is considered one of the leaders of the local market. Already active in Mozambique for 120 years. The network's Standard Bank is one of the largest in the country. Covers all major towns and cities of Mozambique, with 44 branches.

==== Namibia ====
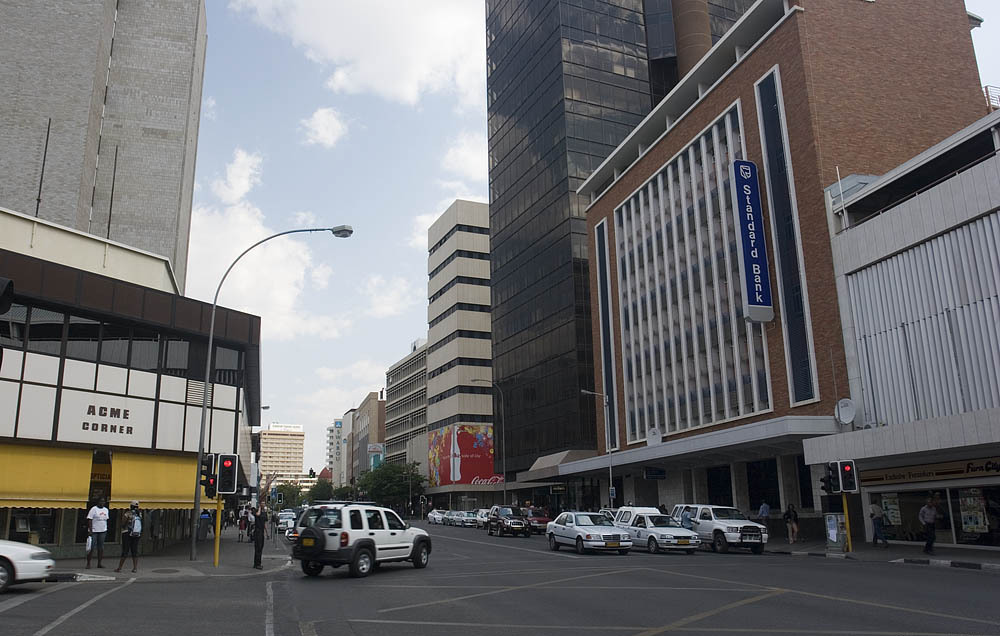
Standard Bank in Windhoek

The Standard Bank Namibia is largely detached from the South African parent company for legal reasons. The bank was established in Namibia by the first commercial branch on 19 August 1915 in Lüderitz. It's one of the largest banks in Namibia and operates from more than 50 branches.

==== Nigeria ====
On 21 August 2007 Standard Bank Group acquired controlling interest in IBTC Chartered Bank. founded by the merger of the International Banking & Trust Company Plc and Chartered Bank Plc. This gave subsidiary Stanbic IBTC Holdings significant presence in the Nigerian market.

==== Tanzania ====
Stanbic Bank building in Dar es Salaam, Tanzania

In 1995, the bank acquired the operations of the Meridien BIAO Bank and renamed it Stanbic Bank Tanzania Limited. In September 2012, Stanbic Bank Tanzania secured financing worth $3 billion for Mchuchuma Iron Ore and Liganga Coal mining project in the Ludewa district of the newly created region of Njombe in southwestern Tanzania.

==== Uganda ====
In 2002, Standard Bank acquired 90 percent of Uganda Commercial Bank, the largest commercial bank in Uganda at that time, making Standard Bank a major actor in the banking sector of that East African country. They renamed the bank Stanbic Bank (Uganda) Limited. As of December 2012, Stanbic Bank (Uganda) was still Uganda's largest commercial bank with approximately 20 percent of all bank assets and about 18 percent of all bank branches in the country. The stock of Stanbic Bank (Uganda) Limited is traded on the Uganda Securities Exchange (USE) under the symbol SBU. Standard Bank Group maintains approximately 80 percent shareholding.

In 2015 Stanbic Bank was involved in a fraud scandal involving money transfers from the Swedish embassy to private accounts of a former embassy employee.

==== Zimbabwe ====
Stanbic Bank Zimbabwe Limited operates as a registered commercial bank in Zimbabwe. In November 1992, Standard Bank began operations in Zimbabwe as Stanbic Bank.

=== Europe ===
==== United Kingdom ====
In the early 1990s the bank started operations in London, and Standard Bank London Ltd was awarded a banking licence in 1992.

It was announced in July 2013 that Standard Bank was in talks to sell business in London to the Industrial and Commercial Bank of China for more than $500 million. In November 2013, Standard Bank confirmed it was in talks to sell a controlling stake in its London-based global markets business.

In January 2014 the Financial Conduct Authority (FCA) fined Standard Bank PLC (Standard Bank) £7,640,400 for failings relating to its anti-money laundering (AML) policies and procedures over corporate customers connected to politically exposed persons (PEPs). Between 15 December 2007 and 20 July 2011, Standard Bank failed to comply with Regulation 20(1) of the Money Laundering Regulations because it failed to take reasonable care to ensure that all aspects of its AML policies were applied appropriately and consistently to its corporate customers connected to PEPs.

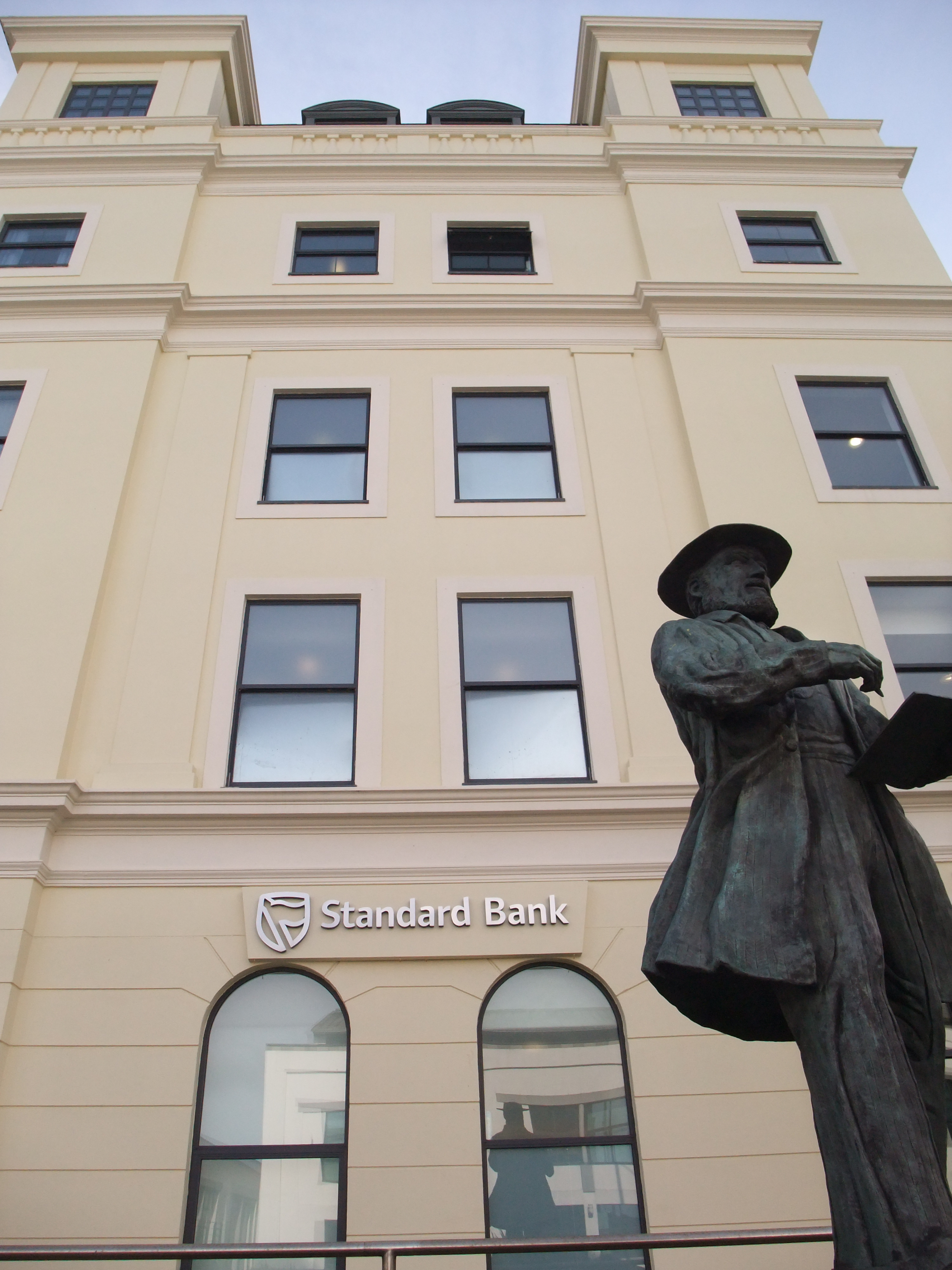
Statue of Manx Poet T.E Brown on Prospect Hill, Douglas Isle of Man, IM1 1SB

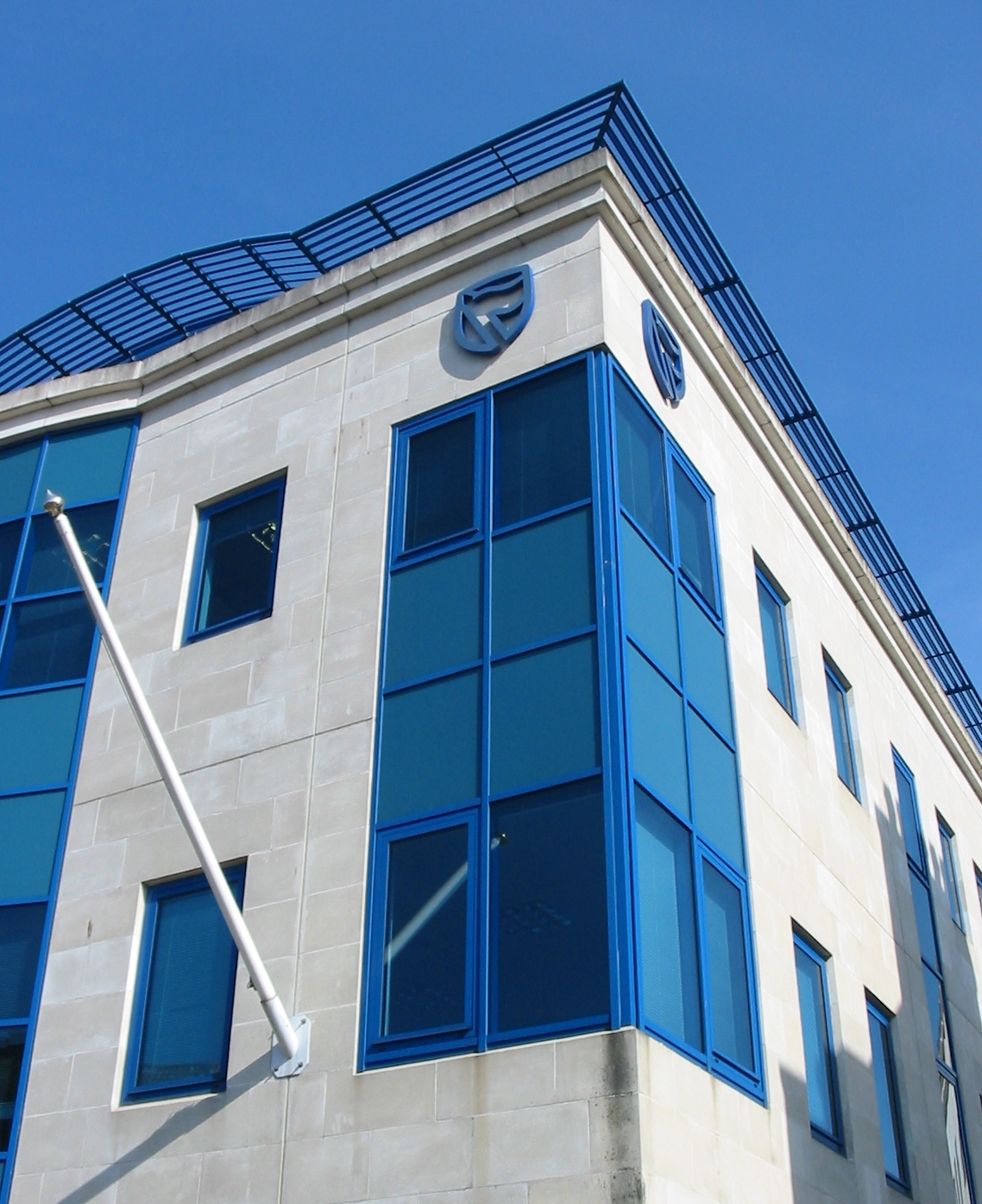
Standard Bank in Jersey

==== Turkey ====
In August 2007, Standard Bank Group acquired a 67% share of the Turkish bank Dundas Ünlü Securities and now operates in Turkey under the name of Standard Ünlü. The bank sold its shares down to 25% in April 2012 and the Turkish sub was renamed ÜNLÜ & Co. afterwards.

==== Russia ====
On 6 March 2009, Standard Bank announced plans to acquire 33% of Russia's second biggest investment bank, Troika Dialog. Troika, which was Russia's oldest brokerage, acquired Standard Bank's Russian banking operation, and in addition received cash of $200-million in the form of a 'convertible loan'. Two executives of Standard Bank joined Troika's six-member board.

In March 2011, Sberbank, number one bank in Russia by the size of capital and assets, bought Troika Dialog and paid Standard Bank $372 million for its 36.4% stake in Troika.

=== Argentina ===
In 2006, Standard Bank bought BankBoston Argentina unit expanding its operations into this country. In 2012, ICBC acquired 80% of its shares. Rebranding occurred in April 2013.

== Investments in Standard Bank ==
=== Loan deal with Chinese banks ===
On 11 September 2009 Industrial and Commercial Bank of China, Industrial and Commercial Bank of China (Macau), Bank of China, China Development Bank, China CITIC Bank initiated $1Billion club loan to Standard Bank.

=== ICBC deal ===
In October 2007 the Industrial and Commercial Bank of China acquired a stake of about 20% in Standard Bank for US$5.5bn. Half the stake came from ICBC acquiring existing shares and half from new shares. ICBC will also get two seats on the board of directors.

== Bank charges ==
In 2005 Standard Bank was rated as having the lowest bank charges in South Africa. By 2010 that had changed, to the extent that Standard Bank was rated by Finweek's review of SA bank charges as having amongst the highest bank charges in the country. A report by Afriforum confirmed Standard Bank's position as having the highest bank charges in the country along with Absa Bank.

== Customer service ==
The South African Customer Satisfaction Index (SAcsi) of 2015 and 2016 rated Standard Bank as being lowest among South African banks in terms of customer service. Its overall movement in this index has shown a mild decline from previous ratings.

Consumer satisfaction at Standard Bank rose by 2.4%, from 75.3 in 2019 to 77.7 in 2020.

== See also ==
- CfC Stanbic Holdings
- Stanbic IBTC Holdings
- Stanbic Bank Uganda
- Alewyn Burger former COO

== Bibliography ==
- Amphlett, George Thomas (1914). History of the Standard Bank of South Africa ltd., 1862-1913. Glasgow, Printed by R. Maclehose.
