= List of banks in South Africa =

This is a list of commercial banks and other credit institutions in South Africa, as updated late 2024 by the Reserve Bank of South Africa.

== List of commercial banks ==
=== Domestic banks ===
- Absa Bank Ltd, part of Absa Group
- African Bank Limited
- Bank Zero
- Bidvest Bank Ltd
- Capitec Bank Ltd
- Discovery Bank
- FirstRand Ltd, part of FirstRand Group
- Investec Bank Ltd
- Nedbank Ltd, part of Nedbank Group
- OM Bank, part of Old Mutual Group
- Sasfin Bank Ltd
- The Standard Bank of South Africa Ltd, part of Standard Bank Group Ltd
- Tyme Bank Ltd

=== Merged or defunct banks ===
- Mercantile Bank Ltd (South Africa), part of Capitec Bank Ltd
- Grindrod Bank, part of African Bank Limited
- Ubank, part of African Bank Limited

=== Foreign subsidiaries ===
- Access Bank (South Africa) Ltd, part of Access Bank Group
- Albaraka Bank Ltd, part of Al Baraka Group
- Habib Bank, part of Habib Bank Group (Pakistan)
- HBZ Bank Ltd, part of Habib Bank Group (Switzerland)

=== Foreign branches ===
- Bank of China
- Bank of Communications
- Bank of Taiwan
- Citibank
- China Construction Bank
- Deutsche Bank
- Goldman Sachs
- HSBC
- JPMorgan Chase
- Standard Chartered Bank
- State Bank of India

== Mutual banks ==
- Bank Zero Mutual Bank
- Finbond Mutual Bank
- GBS Mutual Bank
- YWBN Mutual Bank

== Co-operative banks ==
- Ditsobotla Primary Savings and Credit Co-operative Banks
- OSK Koöperatiewe Bank Beperk
- Ziphakamise Savings and Credit Co-operative Bank
- KSK Koöperatiewe Bank Beperk
- GIG Co-operative Bank

== See also ==
- Development Bank of Southern Africa
- Land and Agricultural Development Bank of South Africa
- Postbank South Africa
- BankservAfrica
- Banking in South Africa
- List of banks in Africa
