= OM Bank =

South African digital bank

- Company type: Subsidiary
- Industry: Financial services Digital banking
- Founded: 2025; 1 year ago
- Headquarters: Cape Town, South Africa
- Number of locations: 346 (Old Mutual partner branches) (2026)
- Area served: South Africa
- Key people: Clarence Nethengwe (CEO); Nomkhita Nqweni (Chairwoman)
- Services: Transactional accounts Savings accounts Credit cards
- Net income: -R1.06 billion (2025)
- Parent: Old Mutual
- Website: oldmutual.co.za/bank

OM Bank is a digital-only bank in South Africa. Founded in 2025 and headquartered in Cape Town, the company is a subsidiary of financial services corporation Old Mutual.

Focused on the retail mass market (specifically the upper income mass market and lower income affluent market segments), the bank competes with the likes of fellow digital-only institutions TymeBank and Bank Zero.

While the bank launched significantly later than competing digital-only institutions like TymeBank, Bank Zero, and Discovery Bank, Old Mutual stated that this was not an issue, but rather a strategic advantage and a win for its future customers. Old Mutual said that it had watched the market and learned what worked before launching OM Bank.

== History ==
In 2016, major South African financial services corporation Old Mutual partnered with UK-based 10x Banking, founded by former Barclays CEO Antony Jenkins, to lay the groundwork for OM Bank.

The group applied for a South African banking license in 2022, and completed the bank's core systems by the end of 2023 at a cost of R1.75 billion. In 2024, OM Bank's board approved a further R800 million for testing and marketing.

In April 2024, the South African Prudential Authority granted Old Mutual approval to establish OM Bank under Section 16 of the Banks Act.

After completing testing with employees and a limited number of invited clients from Old Mutual, OM Bank soft launched in 2025, launching to the public in September of that same year. The bank could not register under its parent company's name (Old Mutual) due to regulatory requirements. The Old Mutual group hoped to leverage its existing customer base, brand, and distribution network to grow the bank.

In January 2026, it was reported that OM Bank had set a goal of reaching break-even by its 2028 financial year. The bank estimated it will need 2.5 million to 3 million customers to become profitable. This accounts for 500,000 dormant customers, as well as 700,000 clients who are not highly active. In a progress update in early November 2025, OM Bank's CEO said the company had around 150,000 customers. In mid-January 2026, OM Bank stated it was receiving around 4,000 to 5,000 new sign-ups each day. If sustained, this would put the bank on track to reach its break-even goal as intended. In the same month, OM Bank said its first annual results would be released in March 2026.

In June 2026, it was reported that OM Bank had reached 473,000 clients, with retail deposits increasing to a total of R541 million. At the same time, Old Mutual confirmed that its Old Mutual Finance division was being integrated into OM Bank, including the transfer of Money Account customers to the bank.

== Operations ==
OM Bank offers digital-only services, with no physical banking infrastructure such as branches or ATMs. However, OM Bank customers are able to use its parent company's Old Mutual branches, of which, as of January 2026, the company had a total of 346 across South Africa. As of September 2025, the bank targets customers earning between R8,000 and R80,000 per month.

Consumers sign up and transact either via a web browser or the bank's app. While the bank doesn't operate ATMs, it has partnered with various South African supermarket chains for cash-based services, including Shoprite, Boxer, Checkers, and Pick n Pay.

As of January 2026, OM Bank provides the following services:

- Transactional and savings accounts
- Credit cards

OM Bank has integrated itself with the overarching Old Mutual Rewards Program of its parent company.

== See also ==
- Old Mutual
- Banking in South Africa
- List of banks in South Africa
