= Eubanks =

Eubanks may refer to:

- Eubanks (surname)
- Eubank, Kentucky, also known as Eubanks
- Eubanks, Oklahoma, ghost town
- Eubanks, Virginia
- Eubanks, North Carolina
- Mount Eubanks, mountain in Antarctica
- Eubanks Point, headland in Antarctica
- 6696 Eubanks, main-belt asteroid

== See also ==
- Eubank (disambiguation)
- Ewbank (disambiguation)
