= African Bank Limited =

South African commercial bank

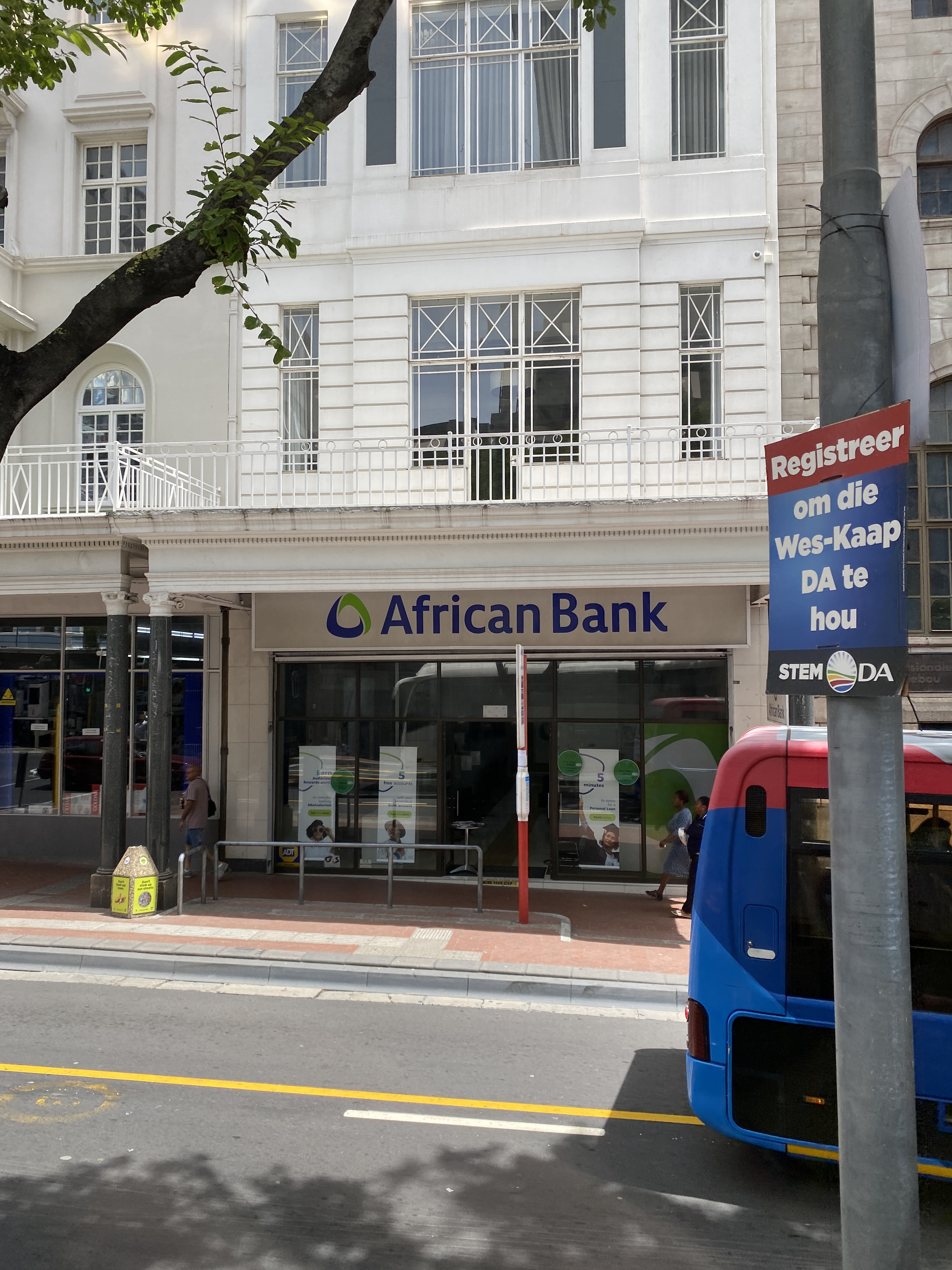
- Type: Private
- Industry: Financial services
- Founded: July 31, 1975; 51 years ago
- Headquarters: Midrand, Gauteng, South Africa
- Key people: Thabo Dloti (Chairman); Kennedy Bungane (CEO)
- Products: Banking, loans, checking, savings, investments, debit cards, credit cards, personal loans
- Operating income: ▼ R 6.74 billion (2024)
- Net income: ▼ R −384 million (2024)
- Total assets: ▲ R 48.46 billion (2024)
- Total equity: ▲ R 11.89 billion (2024)
- Number of employees: 4,235 (2024)
- Website: africanbank.co.za

African Bank is a South African retail bank that offers financial products and services. It is licensed as a "locally controlled bank" by the South African Reserve Bank (SARB).

Headquartered in Midrand, Gauteng, the bank has a countrywide branch distribution network in addition to a full digital channel offering; as well as sales, collections and customer service contact centres.

== Overview ==
As of 30 September 2022, African Bank Limited had total assets worth ZAR:28.695 billion, with shareholders' equity of ZAR:11.080 billion. In 2019, the bank, its subsidiaries and affiliates employed 3,886 people.

== History ==
At a 1964 National Federal Chamber of Commerce (NAFCOC) conference a call was made for the creation of a bank for Black South Africans. Sam Mostuenyane, who led NAFCOC at that time, attempted to raise the capital to start the bank but failed. It was only in 1975 when R1 million was raised and met Reserve Bank approval, that it was founded. The original African Bank Limited, was established on 31 July 1975, and was a subsidiary of African Bank Investments Limited, then a bank-controlling company listed on the Johannesburg Stock Exchange. The first branch opened in Ga-Rankuwa near Pretoria.

In 1995, the bank experienced financial difficulties and its controlling stake was purchased for R100 million by Natal Building Society and New African Investments Limited. They restructured the bank from a deposit taker into a lending bank and relisted it on the JSE. In 1998, Theta Investment Group Limited acquired the bank's license. In 1999, Theta changed its name to African Bank Investments Limited (ABIL).

On 10 August 2014, the original African Bank Limited was placed under curatorship by the South African Reserve Bank, under the terms of the South African Banks Act, Act 94 of 1990. Thomas Winterboer was appointed as curator to implement the restructuring proposal and manage the affairs of the bank, subject to the supervision of the Registrar of Banks. It was established that the original bank had poor lending practices that resulted in write-downs of bad loans.

The SARB announced a restructuring proposal, which received support from a consortium of six South African banks and the Public Investment Corporation. A new banking group, African Bank Holdings Limited, was created to assume the viable assets and some of the liabilities of the old bank. The legacy bank and the compromised part of the business was renamed Residual Debt Services Limited (RDS). RDS surrendered its banking license on 4 April 2014.

On 4 April 2016, the new African Bank Limited opened its doors as the new entity, with the required licenses and registrations required by the various regulators in place.

In May 2022, African Bank announced a deal to acquire Grindrod Bank in addition to their holding company Grindrod Financial Holdings. African Bank stated that the acquisition worth R1.5 billion, will aid the introduction of business banking into their services since Grindrod Bank has 26 years of specialisation in the corporate and investment banking sector.

== Shareholding ==
As of September 2022, the shareholding in the stock of African Bank Limited, was as depicted in the table below.

African Bank Limited stock ownership
Rank	Name of owner	Percentage ownership
1	South African Reserve Bank (SARB)	50.00
2	Government Employees Pension Fund (GEPF)	25.00
3	FirstRand Bank Limited	7.00
4	Standard Bank of South Africa Limited	6.00
5	Absa Trading and Investment Solutions Proprietary Limited	5.00
6	Nedbank Limited	4.00
7	Investec Bank Limited	2.00
8	Capitec Bank Limited	1.00
	Total	100.00

== See also ==
- Banking in South Africa
- List of banks in South Africa
