= NBS =

NBS may refer to:

== Business ==
- National Bank of Samoa
- National Bank of Serbia
- National Bank of Slovakia
- National Book Store, in the Philippines
- Nationwide Building Society, UK
- NBS (Natal Building Society), former bank in South Africa
- NBS Bank, Malawi
- Nelson Building Society, New Zealand
- Newcastle Building Society, UK

== Science and technology ==
- National Bureau of Standards, former name of National Institute of Standards and Technology, US
- Nature-based solutions, use of nature for addressing societal challenges
- N-Bromosuccinimide, a chemical reagent
- Newborn screening, a series of medical tests given to newborn babies
- Nijmegen breakage syndrome, a genetic medical condition

== Schools ==
- Nottingham Business School, UK
- National Broadcasting School, UK
- NUST Business School, of the National University of Sciences and Technology, Pakistan

== Telecommunications ==
- Nagano Broadcasting Systems, Japan
- National Broadcasting Service, former name of National Broadcasting Network (Trinidad and Tobago)
- National Broadband Plan (United States)
- NBS Television (Uganda)
- Nippon Broadcasting System, Japan

== Other ==
- Changbaishan Airport, China (IATA code)
- NASCAR Busch Series, the former name of the NASCAR Xfinity Series
- National Battlefield Site, a protected area in the United States
- National Building Specification, a system of construction specification used in the UK
- National Bureau of Statistics (disambiguation)
- National Library of Serbia
- Navigation and Bombing System, formerly used by the Royal Air Force, UK
- No Bad Songz, 2018 album by Kizz Daniel

== See also ==
- NBSS (disambiguation)
