= Lesaka Technologies =

South African fintech

- Formerly: Net 1 UEPS Technologies
- Type: Public
- Traded as: JSE: LSK; Nasdaq: LSAK
- ISIN: US64107N2062
- Industry: Fintech
- Founded: 2017; 9 years ago
- Founder: Serge Belamant
- Headquarters: Johannesburg, Gauteng, South Africa
- Area served: Southern Africa; United Kingdom
- Key people: Ali Mazanderani (Chairman)
- Revenue: ▲$659 million (2025)
- Operating income: ▼ -$27 million (2025)
- Net income: ▼ -$87 million (2025)
- Total assets: ▲$653 million (2025)
- Total equity: ▼$165 million (2025)
- Website: lesakatech.com

Lesaka Technologies (formerly Net 1 UEPS Technologies) is a South African financial technology company that is listed on the NASDAQ (Nasdaq: LSAK) and Johannesburg Stock Exchange (JSE: LSK).

Founded in 2017 and headquartered in Johannesburg, Gauteng, The company says its focus is on financial inclusion, providing financial services to underserved communities and merchants.

== History ==
The company was founded as Net 1 UEPS Technologies in 1997, by Serge Belamant, who also developed its basic technology. He left the company in 2017 under a "separation agreement" filed with the Securities and Exchange Commission for $8 million.

Herman Kotze, the company's chief financial officer, became its CEO after Belamant's departure. The company became known for products such as EasyPay and Cash Paymaster Services (CPS).

In 2020, Value Capital Partners invested R580 million into the company and began a process of redefining the strategy, appointing a new board and management team, and strengthening the company's corporate governance.

In 2021, the company appointed Chris Meyers as its new CEO.

In 2022, Net1 rebranded as Lesaka Technologies, which coincided with the R3.7 billion acquisition of the Connect Group.

Meyer stepped down as chief executive in 2023. Upon his departure from the company, Ali Mazanderani was appointed as executive chairman and former chairman Kuben Pillay became lead independent director.

== Acquisitions ==
In 2010, the company announced that it would acquire KSNet, a Korean payment processor, for $233 million. Net1 expanded into the United Kingdom with the acquisition of Zazoo in 2015. It reached an agreement with MobiKwik, a mobile phone based payment system and digital wallet based in India, in 2016.

Net1 sold KSNet to Stonebridge Capital and Payletter for $237 million in March 2020. In September 2020, Cash Paymaster Services (CPS), a subsidiary of Net1, went into liquidation. It had been in a previous legal dispute over deductions from grant payments for micro loans‚ airtime and other financial services.

In March 2022 Net1's R3.7 billion 100% acquisition of the Connect Group was approved by the South African Competition authorities. The transaction was first announced in November last year, when Net1 signed a definitive agreement to acquire 100% of the Connect Group.

In February 2024 Lesaka announced it was acquiring Touchsides, a platform-as-a-service and software-as-a-service solutions provider to licensed tavern outlets.

In May 2024, Lesaka Technologies acquired Adumo, a payment platform headquartered in Cape Town, for $85 million.

In June 2025, Lesaka Technologies signed a deal to acquire Bank Zero, a South African digital mutual bank, for R1.091 billion, pending regulatory approvals. The deal received approval from the South African Competition Commission in late 2025. In June 2026 it was reported that the acquisition's deadline had been extended to 31 January 2027, due to pending regulatory approvals. In October 2026, the deal was awaiting Prudential Authority and Reserve Bank approvals, which Lesaka said it estimated would be complete by December 2026.

== Controversies ==
=== SASSA grant beneficiaries scandal ===
Subsidiary Cash Paymaster Services (CPS) was the primary contractor responsible for paying millions of South African Social Security Agency (SASSA) grant beneficiaries from 2012 to 2018. The R10 billion, five-year contract was controversial due to irregularities in the procurement process and concerns over the exploitation of grant beneficiaries. The contract was ruled invalid in AllPay v CEO of SASSA in the Constitutional Court.

Cash Paymaster Services was ordered to pay SASSA implementation costs; it was subsequently liquidated in 2020, and Net1 rebranded as Lesaka Technologies. SASSA said it intends to recover the R1.5 billion it is owed.

In its Form-10K to the SEC in 2022, Lesaka said it continues to cater to grant recipients through its EasyPay Everywhere platform, with the majority of its active 1.9 million customers being grant recipients.
