= 10X Investments =

South African investment company

- Type: Subsidiary
- Industry: Investment; Finance
- Founded: 2008; 18 years ago
- Founder: Steven Nathan
- Headquarters: Cape Town, South Africa
- Area served: South Africa
- Key people: Tobie van Heerden (CEO); Christopher Eddy (Head of Investments)
- Services: Financial services
- AUM: R68 billion (2026)
- Owner: Old Mutual
- Website: 10x.co.za

10X Investments, alternatively referred to simply as 10X, is an investment firm based in Cape Town, South Africa. Founded in 2008, the company had total assets under management of R68 billion in 2026.

As of 2026, 10X is a subsidiary of major South African financial services company Old Mutual, through its Old Mutual Wealth division.

== History ==
10X Investments was founded in 2008 by Steven Nathan, who then served as the company's CEO. Also in 2008, the company launched corporate umbrella retirements funds, with the first multi-asset index tracking in South Africa, and recorded an assets under management (AUM) total value of R130 million.

The following year, it launched its retail business, and recorded a total AUM value of R245 million.

In 2014, major South African financial services group Old Mutual bought a 30% shareholding in 10X, via its Old Mutual Private Equity division. In the same year, UK-based investment firm DiGAME also invested in 10X.

In November 2017, 10X announced that it had acquired R83.76 million in new funding from existing shareholder Old Mutual Private Equity, and new shareholder DiGAME Investment Company. 10X said it would use the funds to further expand its retail offering, as well as consider international opportunities. At the time, 10X managed over R8 billion on behalf of individuals, and blue-chip clients such as Virgin Active, General Motors and Deutsche Bank.

In 2018, 10X launched its first unit trusts, and recorded a total assets under management value of R9.4 billion.

In January 2021, after 15 years at the helm, 10X Investments’ founder and CEO Steven Nathan resigned. Subsequently, the company’s chairman, Henk Beets, assumed the role of acting CEO.

In 2023, 10X acquired CoreShares Asset Management, an exclusively intermediated assets firm. The acquisition resulted in 10X becoming a full-service asset management firm with over R31 billion in assets under management. After around 18 months since the acquisition, the firms' combined assets had grown to around R41 billion. That same year, 10X listed the first actively managed ETF on the JSE Limited, South Africa's largest stock exchange.

In October 2025, South African financial services group Old Mutual announced that it intended to acquire 10X Investments for R2.2 billion, subject to regulatory approval. At the time, 10X had over 60,000 clients, and total AUM of R68 billion.

The deal was unconditionally approved by the South African Competition Tribunal in January 2026. As part of the acquisition, Old Mutual Wealth would acquire 10X Investments from its sister company, Old Mutual Private Equity (OMPE), and independent company DiGame Investments. Old Mutual said that it was acquiring the increased shareholding in 10X in order to increase its exposure to passive investments in South Africa.

== Operations ==
10X provides services including retirement annuities, living annuities, preservation funds, unit trusts, and tax-free investments. It does so across two flagship funds - 10X Your Future and 10X Income - as well as numerous other funds, including its offshore 10X MSCI World Index Feeder fund.

As is required under South African law, 10X is a Financial Services Provider licensed with the Financial Sector Conduct Authority (FSCA). The company is also a Section 13B Pension Funds Administrator (under the Pension Funds Act 24 of 1956).

== See also ==
- Banking in South Africa
- Old Mutual
