= PayInc =

Automated clearing house in South Africa

- Formerly: BankservAfrica
- Company type: Automated clearing house
- Industry: Financial services
- Founded: 1972; 54 years ago
- Headquarters: Johannesburg, South Africa
- Area served: Africa
- Products: Payment processing, Clearing and settlement services, Consulting
- Services: Payment collection, Payment switching, Clearing and settlement, Consulting, System hosting, Business process outsourcing, SWIFT bureau and payment solutions, Disaster recovery, Business continuity
- Parent: Reserve Bank of South Africa (50%); South African commercial banks (50%)
- Website: payinc.co.za

PayInc (formerly BankservAfrica) is an automated clearing house located in Johannesburg, South Africa, serving both national and pan-African transactions. It annually processes a significant volume of transactions, encompassing various sectors such as banking, corporates, government, and retail. Its role as Africa's largest automated payments clearing house is primarily attributed to its substantial transaction volume.

== History ==
Prior branding

The establishment of BankservAfrica originated from the need to unify shared services within the South African banking industry. Prior to its formation in 1972 as the Automated Clearing Bureau (Pty) Limited, various industry-owned companies operated independently in different payment channels. The transformation aimed to streamline operations, leading to the eventual rebranding as BankservAfrica in 2010. In August 2025, it rebranded to PayInc.

In 2025, the Competition Commission approved a 50% acquisition of PayInc by the Reserve Bank of South Africa.

== Shareholders ==
PayInc is entirely owned by South African commercial banks, with the following shareholders:

- Absa Bank Limited (23.125%)
- FirstRand Limited (23.125%)
- Nedbank Limited (23.125%)
- Standard Bank of South Africa Limited (23.125%)
- Dandyshelf Group (7.5%), comprising:
  - Grobank
  - Bidvest Bank
  - Capitec Bank
  - CitiBank
  - Investec Bank
  - Mercantile Bank
  - Teba Bank Limited

== PayShap ==
PayShap is an instant payment inter-bank electronic funds transfer service. The service had arisen from the Reserve Bank's Payments Ecosystem Modernisation (PEM) programme; PayShap is part of the Rapid Payments Platform (RPP). It was launched in March 2023 and has 12 banks participating: Absa, Al Baraka Bank, African Bank, Capitec Bank, Discovery Bank, FNB, HBZ Bank Limited, Investec, Nedbank, OM Bank, Standard Bank, and GoTyme Bank. Users link their bank accounts to an identifier called a ShapID; this is essentially the cellphonenumber@bank. Depending on the bank, there may be a fee associated with a PayShap transfer.
