= Eubanks (surname) =

Eubanks is a surname. It is a plural variant of the English surname Eubank. Notable people with the surname include:

- Austin Eubanks (1981–2019), American public speaker and expert on drug-addiction and recovery
- Bob Eubanks (born 1938), American game show host
- Christopher Eubanks (born 1996), American tennis player
- David Eubanks (born 1935), American preacher, president of Johnson Bible College 1969–2007
- Drew Eubanks (born 1997), American basketball player
- Duane Eubanks (born 1969), American jazz trumpeter and flugelhornist
- Eugene Eubanks (1938–2011), American educator and school administrator
- Gordon Eubanks (born 1946), American computer industry executive
- Jerry Eubanks (born 1950), American musician
- James Eubanks (born 1992/3), known as "Clayster", American professional Call of Duty video game player
- J.J. Eubanks (John Eubanks, born 1968), American basketball player
- John Eubanks (born 1983), American football player
- Kevin Eubanks (born 1957), American guitarist and composer
- Kristin Eubanks (born 1981), American wrestler
- Lester Eubanks (born 1943), American murderer and fugitive
- Luther B. Eubanks (1917–1996), American judge
- Nick Eubanks (born 1996), American football player
- Rachael A. Eubanks, American state treasurer
- Rachel Eubanks (1922–2006), African-American classical composer
- Ralph Eubanks (born 1957), American author, essayist, journalist, professor and public speaker
- Ray E. Eubanks (1922–1944), American soldier, Medal of Honor recipient
- Robin Eubanks (born 1955), American trombonist
- Sijara Eubanks (born 1985), American mixed martial artist
- Uel Eubanks (1903–1954), American baseball player
- Virginia Eubanks (born 1972), American political scientist

== See also ==
- Eubank (disambiguation)
- Ewbank (disambiguation)
