= Standard Chartered South Africa =

Financial services company

Standard Chartered Bank South Africa
- Company type: Private company
- Industry: Financial services
- Founded: 1992
- Headquarters: Sandton, South Africa
- Products: Loans, transaction accounts, savings, investments, debit cards
- Revenue: ▲ Aftertax:
- Total assets: ZAR:32,239,234,000 (2014)
- Number of employees: 600+ (2014)
- Parent: Standard Chartered
- Website: www.sc.com/za/

Standard Chartered South Africa, whose full name is Standard Chartered Bank South Africa, often referred to as Stanchart South Africa, is a commercial bank in South Africa. It is a subsidiary of British Standard Chartered and is registered as a Foreign Bank, by the South African Reserve Bank.

The bank is a large financial services provider. As of December 2014, its total assets were valued at ZAR:32,239,234,000. At that time, the shareholders' equity was ZAR:3,765,873,000.

== Branch network ==
In April 2016, the bank had opened branches in Johannesburg, Cape Town, and Durban.

== See also ==
- List of banks in South Africa
