= Discovery Bank =

South African digital bank

- Type: Subsidiary
- Industry: Financial services Digital banking
- Founded: November 14, 2018; 7 years ago
- Headquarters: Sandton, Gauteng, South Africa
- Area served: South Africa
- Key people: Hylton Kallner (CEO)
- Services: Transactional accounts Savings accounts Credit cards Personal loans Home loans Revolving credit
- Revenue: ▲ R3.1 billion (June 2026)
- Total assets: ▲ R34.66 billion (March 2026)
- Parent: Discovery Limited
- Website: discovery.co.za/portal/bank/

Discovery Bank is a major digital-only bank in South Africa. Founded in 2015 and headquartered in Sandton, Gauteng, the company is a subsidiary of JSE-listed financial services corporation Discovery Limited.

While not a private bank, it targets affluent clients. As of June 2026, Discovery Bank serves 1.57 million customers in South Africa.

== History ==
In 2016, South African financial services company Discovery Limited announced that it had set aside R1 billion to build the digital infrastructure in order to launch its own bank, and that it was awaiting approval of its banking license. Discovery acknowledged that its bank would target affluent consumers, and aimed to launch within two years. At the time, former FNB CEO Michael Jordaan said that Discovery Bank had great potential.

As part of its founding, the bank bought the customer base (totaling 300 000 individuals) that it had established in 2004, when it began offering a credit card via its Discovery Card Joint Venture partnership with existing South African bank, FNB.

Discovery Bank launched in November 2018, at a media briefing in Sandton, Johannesburg, with the goal of being open to customers in early 2019. Discovery Limited's CEO described the new institution as a "behavioral bank" that worked to address behaviors leading to poor financial outcomes. He also said the bank could be integrated with Discovery Vitality rewards, as well as with other Discovery products, including investments, life insurance, medical aid, and insurance.

Discovery Bank launched in the same month that competing South African digital banks, TymeBank and Bank Zero, began testing their own offerings.

In February 2019, it was reported that Discovery Limited had spent R6 billion launching its bank.

In December 2020, CEO Barry Hore, who oversaw the bank’s build and migration phase, stepped down from his role. He was replaced by Hylton Kallner, who had been Discovery's Chief Marketing Officer and Chair of the Discovery South Africa Exco. At the time, Discovery Bank announced that it had over 500,000 customers, and R5 billion in retail deposits.

In partnership with South African fintech Cumulate, in June 2021, Discovery Bank launched financial education platform Worth. The platform's online courses were launched with the goal of teaching individuals how to manage their money more effectively, boosting financial knowledge and building wealth.

In June 2023, Discovery Bank launched a new finance product for residential solar and backup power services, in partnership with local power system hardware distributor Rubicon. The goal was to offer Discovery Bank clients solar solutions with competitive finance options. At launch, the offering would be available to select clients, expanding over time. The service would include an online energy needs calculator, a dedicated solar budget facility, and Rubicon Energy Advisors to assist with the power system's selection process.

In December 2024, Discovery stated that over 80% of its home loans came from clients moving those loans from an existing provider, with just 20% of them being new home loans.

In March 2025, it was reported that Discovery had invested R15 billion in building its banking infrastructure. At the time, the bank had reached 1 million customers, and had begun making a profit (ahead of its target date).

Discovery Limited's June 2025 Annual Financial Statements recorded total customer deposits at Discovery Bank of R23,3 billion, constituting an increase of 26% year-over-year.

In September 2025, Discovery Bank stated its intention to double its 1.2 million strong customer base and increase its profits to R3 billion by 2029. The company stated that it was gaining around 1 000 customers per day. The company further stated its goal of launching an AI tool to integrate into its banking services. Its total number of banking clients had increased by 32%, and total number of accounts by 35% (to 2.61 million) year-over-year.

Also in September 2025, it was reported that Discovery's home loans portfolio was worth over R2,2 billion.

In June 2026, Discovery Bank posted its first profit. The bank generated R370 million in normalized profit from operations, representing a 644% increase year-over-year. The company's revenue increased by 31% to R3.1 billion, and its retail deposits increased 17% to R27.2 billion. That same month, Discovery Bank had a total of 1.57 million customers. The company revealed that it planned to use AI to expand its service during stage two of its development, and said that AI already managed the majority of the bank's customer service functions.

== Operations ==
Discovery Bank offers digital-only services, with no physical banking infrastructure such as branches or ATMs. Consumers sign up and transact either via a web browser or the bank's app.

Discovery Bank provides the following services:

- Transactional and savings accounts
- Credit cards
- Personal loans and home loans
- Revolving credit facilities

The bank partners with various South African companies for rewards, including Woolworths, Pick n Pay, Clicks, TotalSports, Sportsmans Warehouse, Virgin Active, Planet Fitness, and Kulula.

== Accolades ==
Discovery Bank was ranked first in DataEQ’s South African Banking Sentiment Index for 2024, and was rated 27% above the banking industry average.

In September 2025, Discovery Bank was voted the best bank for customer service for the fourth consecutive year, in the ASK AFRICA Orange Index (an independent benchmark study in the field of customer experience).

== See also ==
- Discovery Limited
- Banking in South Africa
- List of banks in South Africa
