= Supergroup =

Supergroup or super group may refer to:

- Super Group Limited, a South African logistics and transport company
- In L-carrier, a multiplexed group of Channel Groups
- Super Group, the holding company for online sports betting and gaming businesses: Betway and Spin
- Super Group, an album by Shonen Knife
- Super-group, a team of superheroes who work together
- Supergroup, a rarely used term in mathematics for the counterpart of a subgroup
- Supergroup (biology), one of a number of taxonomic groups proposed for eukaryotes
- Supergroup (City of Heroes), the term for player guilds in the City of Heroes MMORPG
- Supergroup (music), a music group formed by artists who are already notable or respected in their fields
- Supergroup (physics), a generalization of groups, used in the study of supersymmetry
- Supergroup (stratigraphy), a geological unit
- Supergroup (TV series), a VH1 reality show
- SuperGroup plc, the former name of British clothing company Superdry
