= BoE Stockbrokers =

Financial services provider

BoE Stockbrokers (Pty) Limited
- Type: Subsidiary
- Founded: 2003
- Headquarters: Cape Town, South Africa
- Key people: Paul Abrahams; Harold D. Kock; Paul S. Finlayson; Brett Lambert; Donald Rogan; Donna Barnes; John Kendall; John Paynter; Michael Wilmot
- Website: nedsecure.co.za

BoE Stockbrokers is an authorised financial services provider, and a member of the Nedbank Group. As a South African stockbroking company, BoE Stockbrokers (Pty) Ltd offers services from personal investment advice and investment management to extensive E-commerce facilities, focussing specifically on high-net-worth and affluent individuals, trusts and small institutional clients.

== History ==
BoE Stockbrokers was a wholly owned subsidiary of BoE (Board of Executors), which was established as a Trust Company in Cape Town in 1838. BoE was a leading independent and specialised banking and financial services group, listed on the Johannesburg Stock Exchange. BoE Stockbrokers was managed as part of the Merchant Banking Group within BoE. BoE was merged with Nedbank in 2003 and BoE Stockbrokers became a brokerage arm of Nedbank and Old Mutual.

== See also ==
- Nedbank
- Old Mutual
