= IKhokha =

South African fintech company

iKhokha
- Type: Subsidiary
- Industry: Fintech
- Founded: 2012; 14 years ago
- Founder: Matt Putman; Ramsay Daly; Clive Putman
- Headquarters: uMhlanga, KwaZulu-Natal, South Africa
- Area served: South Africa
- Products: Payment terminals
- Services: Online payment services
- Parent: Nedbank (since 2025)
- Website: ikhokha.com

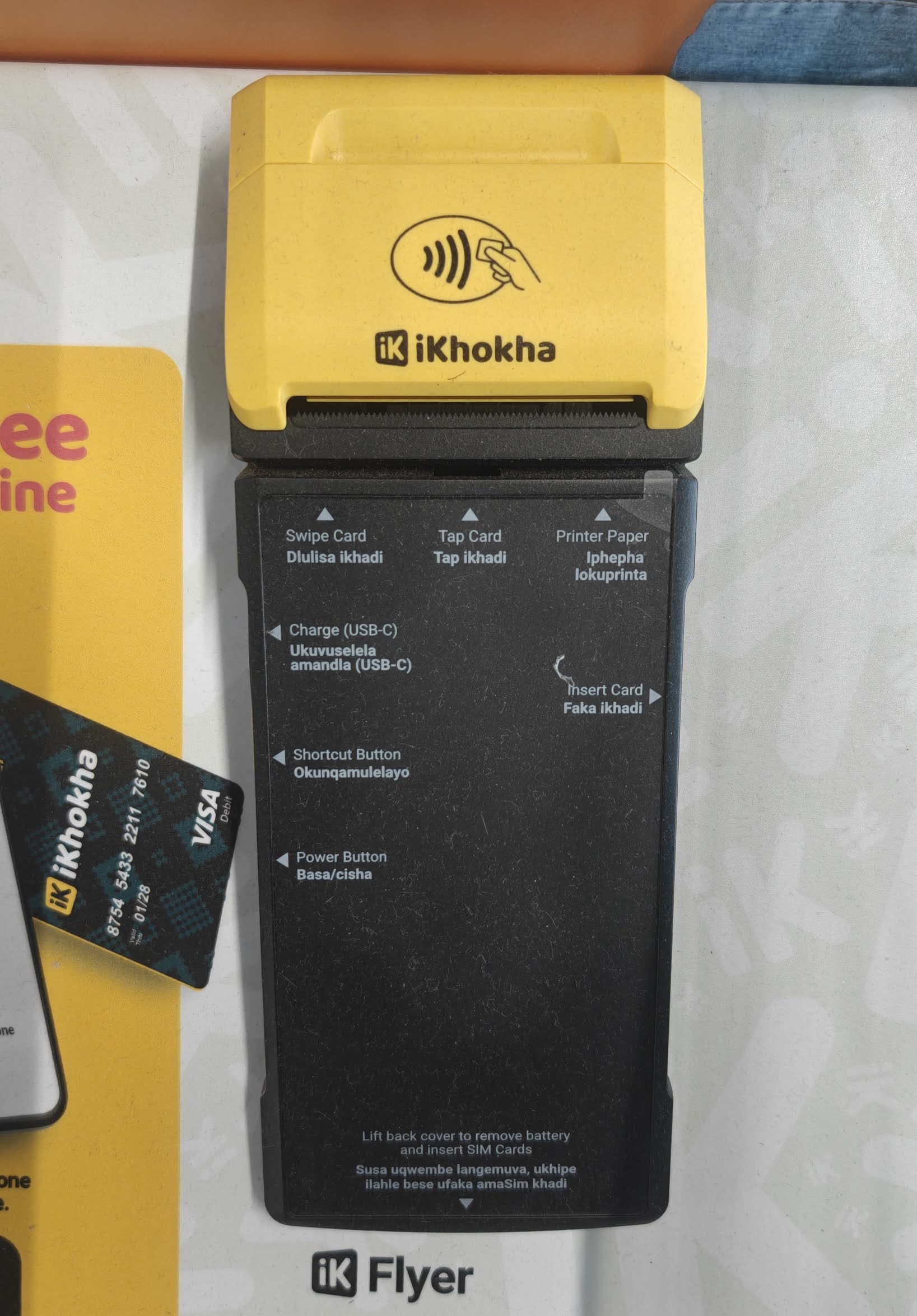
iKhokha payment terminal

iKhokha is a South African fintech company, providing online payment solutions. Founded in 2012 and headquartered in uMhlanga, KwaZulu-Natal, the company sells a variety of card machines and POS systems, and offers debit cards, accounting software, business insurance, and a business management dashboard.

iKhokha has been a wholly-owned subsidiary of major South African commercial bank Nedbank since its 2025 acquisition. That same year, iKhokha was processing over R20 billion in annual digital transactions.

== History ==
iKhokha was founded in 2012 by Matt Putman, Clive Putman, and Ramsay Daly, with the goal of increasing South African entrepreneurial access to the digital economy. Part of the inspiration for the creation of the company came from Matt Putman reading about the establishment of US payment company Square (now Block).

In 2016, the company began offering loans (which it called cash advances) to its merchants. Applications are done in-app, and once merchants agree to repayment terms, they receive the funds within 24 hours. At the time the service launched, iKhokha had around 2,500 clients.

In 2019, iKhokha funders Crossfin Holdings and Apis Partners created adumo (now Lesaka), a funding consolidation vehicle that brought together numerous fintech companies, including iKhokha, Switchpay, and Innervation. While some fintech's were rolled into the adumo name, iKhokha remained a separate brand in the market. iKhokha was unbundled from the adumo platform in 2023.

In 2022, the company launched its iK Pay Gateway, a credit and debit card payment gateway for WooCommerce websites. That same year, it released iK Pay Link, which enables merchants to send a payment link to a customer via social media, WhatsApp, SMS or e-mail, via the iKhokha app.

In July 2024, it was reported that iKhokha had surpassed R2 billion in disbursed working capital to its customer base.

In August 2025, major South African commercial bank Nedbank announced an agreement where it would wholly acquire iKhokha for approximately R1.65 billion. The deal was part of the bank's strategy to expand its support for SMEs. The acquisition thus marked the exit of iKhokha's initial investors - Apis Partners, Crossfin Holdings, and the International Finance Corporation (IFC).

In October 2025, the Competition Commission gave its approval for iKhokha's acquisition by Nedbank. No public interest concerns were raised, and the transaction was thus approved without conditions. Two months later, the bank confirmed it intended to run iKhokha as a standalone subsidiary.

In April 2026, it was reported that South African Total Workspace Solutions franchise Nashua had partnered with iKhokha, to integrate the latter's payment solutions into its own SME offering.

== Operations ==
As of December 2025, iKhokha has 55,000 payment devices in operation across its SME clients. Devices are bought outright, and no device service fee is charged, as is the case with some commercial bank payment terminals. iKhokha incentivizes merchants by decreasing their transaction rates the more payments they process through its devices.

iKhokha produces dual SIM payment terminals that are compatible with card providers VISA, Amex, and Mastercard, and have NFC payment functionality.

== Accolades ==
In 2016, iKhokha received the MTN Enterprise App of the year award. The company received the award again in 2023.

In October 2022, iKhokha won the Accelerating Digital Acceptance in Africa award at Mastercard's EMEA EDGE Conference in Dubai. iKhokha was recognized for its newly-released iK Tap on Phone product, and its positive impact on SMEs across South Africa. The Tap on Phone product enables business owners to receive card payments with a tap of a customer's bank card on the vendor's smartphone, and was released as part of iKhokha's mission to increase SME's access to affordable payment solutions.

== See also ==
- Banking in South Africa
- Economy of the Western Cape
