= Federal Office of Statistics =

Federal Office of Statistics may refer to:

- Federal Statistical Office (Switzerland)
- Federal Office of Statistics (Bosnia and Herzegovina)
- Federal Office of Statistics (Nigeria), now National Bureau of Statistics of Nigeria

See also

- National Bureau of Statistics (disambiguation)
