= Mukuru (South Africa) =

South African fintech

- Type: Private
- Industry: Financial services
- Founded: 2004; 22 years ago
- Founder: Rob Burrell; Andre Ferreira; Brian Nugent
- Headquarters: Cape Town, Western Cape, South Africa
- Area served: Worldwide, across 60+ countries
- Key people: Andy Jury (CEO)
- Services: Money transfers Payment facilitation Bank cards
- Website: mukuru.com

Mukuru, officially Mukuru Africa Pty Ltd, is a South African fintech, based in Cape Town. Founded in 2004, the company provides financial services including international money transfers, payment facilitation, and other financial products to consumers across Africa, Asia, and Europe.

As of 2026, Mukuru has over 17 million customers.

== History ==
Mukuru was founded in 2004, initially as a platform enabling people in the United Kingdom to purchase international airtime vouchers for family members in Zimbabwe.

In 2010, Mukuru established its South African business through a joint venture with bureau de change Inter-Africa, and began expanding its electronic remittance services in the country.

In 2012, the company expanded into additional African markets and introduced agent-assisted customer registration, in-home KYC verification, and a USSD-based service, with major South African retail chain PEP becoming its first South African retail partner.

In 2017, Mukuru expanded beyond remittances with the introduction of the Mukuru Card, backed by local financial institution Standard Bank, enabling customers to receive salaries, make electronic purchases, and access their funds. The company subsequently expanded its operations into Asia and additional African markets, while establishing its Mukuru Orange Booth network in Zimbabwe.

In 2018, Mukuru introduced intra-African remittance services, while in 2019 it expanded into Uganda, Eswatini, and Tanzania, and introduced remittance services through WhatsApp.

In 2020, Mukuru expanded into China, acquired several hundred Zoona booths in Malawi, launched additional digital services, and became a payout partner for WorldRemit.

By 2021, Mukuru had expanded from a remittance service into a broader financial-services platform, offering products including Mukuru Groceries and the Mukuru Money Card. The company reported having served over 8 million customers through its network, and having processed over 80 million transactions.

In December 2024, the Reserve Bank of Zimbabwe authorised Mukuru's Zimbabwean subsidiary to operate as a deposit-taking microfinance institution, allowing it to offer savings and other financial products beyond remittances. In March 2025, the company launched the Mukuru Wallet in Zimbabwe. At the launch, Zimbabwe's deputy finance minister said that Mukuru had handled 52% of the country's estimated US$2 billion in diaspora remittances in 2024.

By 2026, Mukuru had over 17 million customers, with around 320,000 pay-in and pay-out locations across over 60 countries.

In January 2026, Mukuru partnered with foreign exchange provider Travelex, allowing customers in South Africa to collect remittance payouts at Travelex's 46 branches in the country.

In 2026, Mukuru moved the banking infrastructure supporting its Mukuru Card EFT accounts from Access Bank to Bank Zero, with customers receiving new Bank Zero–Mukuru account details while retaining their existing cards. The arrangement formed part of Bank Zero's alliance banking model, under which fintechs and digital platforms offer financial products using the bank's infrastructure.

== See also ==
- Banking in South Africa
