= NBSS (disambiguation) =

NBSS is short for NetBIOS Session Service.

NBSS may also refer to:

== Schools ==
- Naval Base Secondary School, a government school in Yishun, Singapore
- North Bennet Street School, a private school in Boston, Massachusetts

== Other ==
- Canadian National Breast Screening Study, a randomized trial in Canada
- National Bank Surveillance System, a bank monitoring system
- Scottish Bible Society, previously known as the National Bible Society of Scotland (NBSS)

== See also ==
- NBS (disambiguation)
