= Natal Building Society =

South African bank

NBS
- Type: Public
- Industry: Banking
- Founded: 1882
- Defunct: 2004
- Successor: Nedbank
- Headquarters: Durban, South Africa
- Area served: South Africa
- Products: Financial services
- Website: www.nedbank.co.za

NBS (previously known as Natal Building Society) was one of the largest Independent banks in South Africa before it went through a series of mergers starting in 1998 to become part of Nedbank by 2004. It was headquartered in Durban.

== History ==
The Natal Building Society (NBS) was established as a building society in 1882.

In 1998, NBS merged with Boland Bank to form NBS Boland. The managing director at that time was John Graham Maxwell. In 1999, NBS Boland merged with B.o.E. Holdings Limited. In 2002, B.o.E. Holdings Limited was merged with Nedcor.

In 2002, The NBS, Cashbank and PEP Bank divisions of BoE were incorporated into Peoples Bank, the subsidiary of Nedbank. and was fully integrated by 2004.

== See also ==
- List of banks in South Africa
- Economy of South Africa
- South African Reserve Bank
