= Canadian National Breast Screening Study =

The Canadian National Breast Screening Study, sometimes abbreviated as CNBSS or NBSS, was a randomized trial conducted with the aim of evaluating whether mammography reduced breast cancer incidence or mortality among women who underwent screening. The trial was initiated in 1980, and was conducted in fifteen screening centers in six different Canadian provinces. It was the first study designed to determine whether mammography was effective among women between the ages of 40 and 49.

== Methodology ==
In the CNBSS, nearly 90,000 women were randomly assigned to either undergo mammographic screening annually, or not undergo it, for five years (1980-1985). The women who participated in the study were aged 40–59, and were divided into two groups: the age 40-49 group and the age 50-59 group. The women aged 40–49 in the mammography group also received annual breast exams, as did the women aged 50–59 in both the mammography and control groups. The women aged 40–49 in the control group received only one breast exam, after which they were told to remain under the care of their family doctor.

== Results ==
The first paper reporting on results of the study was published in 1992, whereupon it generated considerable debate in the scientific community. In February 2014, the BMJ published more results from the study after following up on the participants for twenty-five years, with the authors concluding that "annual mammography in women aged 40-59 does not reduce mortality from breast cancer beyond that of physical examination or usual care when adjuvant therapy for breast cancer is freely available." The study also reported substantial overdiagnosis among women who had been screened, which the authors stated accounted for about 22% of the cancers detected by screening.

== Reaction ==
H. Gilbert Welch, of the Dartmouth Institute for Health Policy and Clinical Practice, has described the CNBSS as “probably the most meticulously done randomized trial of screening mammography." In contrast, in response to the 2014 study reporting on the results of the CNBSS after twenty-five years of follow up, the American College of Radiology (ACR) and Society of Breast Imaging issued a statement describing the paper as “an incredibly misleading analysis based on the deeply flawed and widely discredited Canadian National Breast Screening Study.” The ACR's statement also claimed that the investigators who conducted the CNBSS allocated women with "large incurable cancers" to the mammography group, which led to more women dying in the screened group. Welch responded to this statement by arguing that if it was true, there would have been more deaths among screened women, when in fact there were the same number of deaths among both the screened and unscreened groups. A 2015 review regarding the CNBSS concluded that its findings are "not applicable to current practice" because the study included a high proportion of women with palpable tumors, which, according to the authors of the review, "cannot contribute to an improved mortality reduction."
