= LeasePlan =

Car leasing company

- Industry: Leasing
- Founded: 1963; 63 years ago
- Headquarters: Netherlands
- Number of locations: Established in 32 countries
- Area served: Worldwide
- Key people: Tex Gunning (CEO)
- Services: Fleet management services
- Owner: ABN Amro (1985–2004); LP Group B.V. (2004–23); ALD (2023–present)
- Number of employees: More than 6500
- Website: www.leaseplan.com

LeasePlan is an international company of Dutch origins, specialised in automobile leasing and fleet management - its products are composed of operational fleet management services. Founded in 1963, it has more than 14% of its approximately 6,600 employees working out of the Netherlands.

On May 22, 2023, the company was acquired by ALD Automotive. However, it was once controlled by a consortium that included Stichting Pensioenfonds Zorg en Welzijn, Arbejdsmarkedets Tillægspension, GIC Private Limited, TDR Capital and Luxinva S.A. of the Abu Dhabi Investment Authority.

== History ==
Founded in the Netherlands in 1963 following a joint venture between a bank and a company providing services to drivers, LeasePlan initially specialised in the open-book management model (an actual costs management system). LeasePlan expanded internationally in the 1970s by establishing operations in Belgium, Germany, France, and Great Britain.

In 1985, the banking group ABN-Amro acquired 100% of the shares in LeasePlan and founded a holding company named ABN-Amro Lease Holding. LeasePlan diversified its offer by introducing an online fleet management software package (Plan8, now called FleetReporting).

Responding to the trend in market consolidation, LeasePlan acquired several companies in the years following 2000 (Dial in Great Britain, in France, and in Italy, and CSC in the United States).

Since 1993 the company holds a banking license.

In 2003, the holding company of the LeasePlan Group was renamed LeasePlan Corporation.

In 2004, ABN-Amro sold LeasePlan Corporation to a consortium consisting of the Volkswagen Group (50%), The Olayan Group (25%), and Mubadala Development Company (25%). In 2009 German Metzler Bank took over the shares of the latter two companies.

In 2012 LeasePlan acquired the Italian car leasing activities of BBVA.

On 21 March 2016, an international consortium led by the Dutch Stichting Pensioenfonds Zorg en Welzijn pension fund completed its acquisition of the company. In 2017, the company announced it was exploring strategic alternatives for the business, that included a potential initial public offering (IPO). However the IPO was cancelled in October 2018, with no further plans to bring the company public.

On 6 January 2022 the French fleet rental and car leasing company ALD Automotive, the listed subsidiary of the French bank Société Générale announced an intention to acquire the company for 4.9 billion euros. The acquisition was completed in May 2023.

== International presence ==
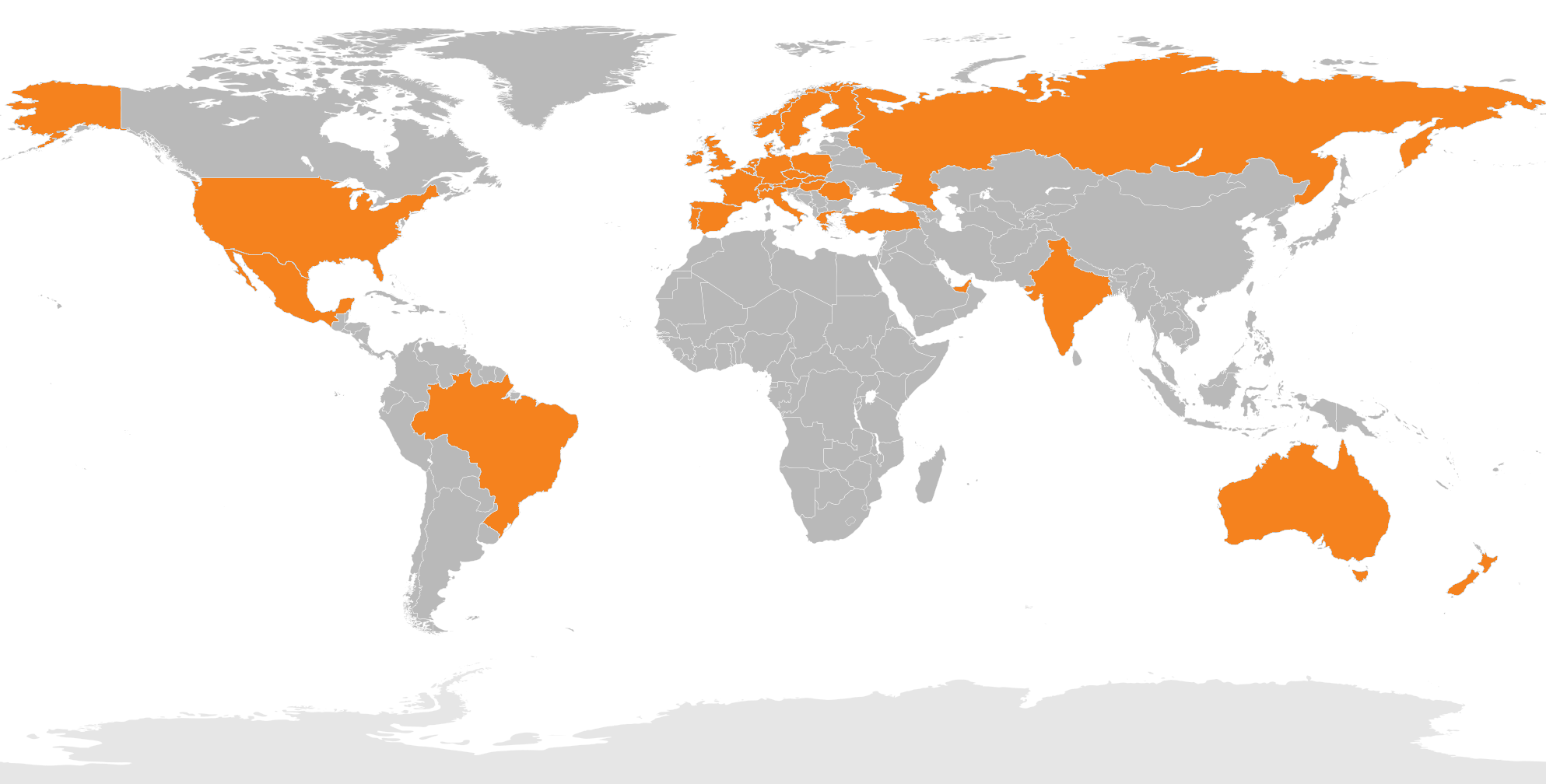
LeasePlan's world presence

LeasePlan, present in over 30 countries, became the first company in the leasing industry to manage more than 1.8 million cars worldwide, and offer fleet management services. LeasePlan is present in both traditional and emerging markets.

=== Countries ===
The following is a list of countries where LeasePlan is established:

==== LeasePlan Europe ====
- Netherlands, France, Belgium, Luxembourg, United Kingdom, Ireland, Portugal, Spain, Denmark, Germany, Switzerland, Norway, Sweden, Finland, Austria, Slovakia, Czech Republic, Poland, Hungary, Greece, Italy, Romania and Turkey.

===== LeasePlan UK =====
LeasePlan UK was created in 1979. The company operates a fleet of over 137,000 vehicles including over 38,000 commercial vehicles. Major clients include NHS, Virgin Media and Carlsberg. It also sells off-lease vehicles to wholesalers and through its new CarNext.com unit. Awards the company has earned include Fleet News leasing company of the year 2016 and Green Fleet leasing company of the year 2016.

==== LeasePlan America ====
- United-States, Canada, Mexico and Brazil

==== LeasePlan Asia ====
- Russia, United Arab Emirates, and India

==== LeasePlan Oceania ====
- In 2021, Australia and New Zealand operations were sold to SG Fleet, a subsidiary of South African holding company Super Group Limited.

== LeasePlan Bank ==
LeasePlan Bank is a Dutch internet savings bank and an undertaking of LeasePlan. LeasePlan Bank was established in 2010 to provide an additional source of financing for LeasePlan's core business.
