= Zoe Cruz =

Greek American banking executive

- Born: Zoe Papadimitriou; February 2, 1955 (age 71); Greece
- Citizenship: American
- Education: Harvard Business School
- Occupation: Business executive
- Known for: Former banking executive at Morgan Stanley
- Spouse: Ernesto Cruz (div. 2014)
- Children: 3

Zoe Cruz (born Zoe Papadimitriou on February 2, 1955) is a Greek American senior banking executive and former co-president of Morgan Stanley. Currently, she serves as Founder and CEO of Menai Financial Group.

== Early life and education ==
Cruz was born Zoe Papadimitriou in Greece. At the age of 14, she and her parents moved to Massachusetts, United States. She graduated from Harvard University magna cum laude with a B.A. in Romance Languages & Literatures in 1977 and earned an MBA from Harvard Business School in 1982.

Cruz is fluent in Greek, English, Spanish and French.

== Career ==
In 1982, after graduating from business school and becoming a mother, Cruz was recruited by Morgan Stanley and had a 25-year tenure at the firm. She became a vice president in 1986, a Principal in 1988, and a managing director in 1990. From 2000 to 2005, she held the position of global Head of Fixed Income, Commodities and Foreign Exchange. She was appointed co-president on February 9, 2006.

In 2006, she was on the list of Forbes' 100 Most Powerful Women of the World and ranked in the #10 spot.

On November 29, 2007, Morgan Stanley announced that Cruz was resigning as co-president of the firm and that she would retire immediately.

Following Morgan Stanley, Cruz was on the board of trustees for the Harlem Children’s Zone, a nonprofit providing education and social service programs for children in New York. She also served on the Harvard College Dean’s Council, the board of directors for the Lincoln Center and as a full committee member for New York-Presbyterian Hospital.

Cruz also sat on the advisory board at Ondra Partners, an independent financial advisory firm founded in 2008.

In 2009, Cruz started hedge fund Vorás Capital Management, a macro, and credit fund. The firm was converted into EOZ Global, a single family office that invests in startups, in 2012. EOZ Global’s holdings span a number of industries, including biotech and manufacturing.

Cruz was appointed as a member of the Bowdoin College Investment Committee in 2012 and remains on the committee today.

In January 2014, Cruz, long dubbed "Cruz Missile," joined the Board of Anglo-South African financial behemoth Old Mutual as an independent non-executive director. She sat on its board of directors through 2018.

From 2016 to 2017, she was a senior advisor to regulatory consulting firm Promontory Financial Group LLC.

Cruz was appointed to the Advisory Council of the Harvard Kennedy School Center for Business and Government in 2016 and still serves on the council today.

Cruz was on the board of directors of Ripple from 2017 to 2019.

In 2018, Cruz was appointed a non-executive director and member of Man Group’s Board and Remuneration Committee, and she maintains these positions with the company to date.

In 2020, Cruz founded Menai Financial Group, a firm that provides institutional-grade investment products, market making services and infrastructure for the digital asset space.

== Accolades ==
In 2015, Cruz was named one of Fortune’s “Most Powerful Women in Business”, and was recognized by The Wall Street Journal as a businesswoman “In Line to Lead.” She was named one of Forbes’ “Most Powerful Women” in 2005, 2006 and 2007. Cruz was named as the highest paid woman by Fortune in 2006, with total compensation of $30 million. In 2007, she was recognized as one of The Wall Street Journal’s “50 Women to Watch in Business,” one of Fortune’s “6 CEOs to Be” and “Power 50”, and one of American Banker’s “Most Powerful Women’s in Finance.” She has also been named one of Crain’s New York’s “Most Powerful Women.”

In 2025, Cruz was featured in the Forbes' 50 Over 50: Investment list.
