= Ewbank (disambiguation) =

Ewbank is a United Kingdom company. Ewbank may also refer to:

- Ewbank (name)
- Ewbank da Câmara, municipality in Minas Gerais, Brazil
- Ewbank scale, a numerical scale for grading the difficulty of rock climbing routes, named after John Ewbank
- Ewbank, Singleton, heritage-listed building in Singleton, New South Wales, Australia
- Ewbanks Liquorice, a former confectionery manufacturer based in Pontefract, England

== See also ==
- Eubank (disambiguation)
- Ewbanks, Illinois
- Ubank Limited, a South African bank operating in the microfinance sector
- UBank, an Australian bank
