= Grindrod Bank =

South African commercial bank

- Type: Private
- Industry: Financial services
- Founded: 1994
- Headquarters: Durban, South Africa,
- Key people: David Polkinghorne (CEO); Rakesh Garach (CFO); Gareth Jasson (COO)
- Products: Loans, savings, invoice discounting, investments, deposits, property, corporate finance
- Total assets: US$550+ million (2009)
- Number of employees: +190 (2020)
- Website: grindrodbank.co.za

Grindrod Bank (GRDB) is a commercial bank in South Africa. It is licensed as a "locally-controlled financial institution" by the South African Reserve Bank, the national banking regulator.

== Overview ==
GRDB is a large financial services provider in South Africa, based on assets. It currently employs ninety six(96) people as of 2011. The bank's total asset base was in excess of US$550 million (ZAR:3.7 billion), with shareholders' equity in excess of US$37 million (ZAR:250 million).

== History ==
The bank was established in 1994 as a subsidiary of Grindrod Limited. The bank maintains headquarters in Durban, with offices in Johannesburg, Pretoria and Cape Town. In 2006, it acquired 100% of the assets of Marriott Merchant Bank. Grindrod Bank focuses on meeting the needs of high-net-worth individuals, large corporations and institutions.

== Ownership ==
As of January 2020, Grindrod Bank is 100% owned by Grindrod Financial Holdings. Grindrod Financial Holdings is 96.83% held by Grindrod Limited.

Grindrod Limited is a holding company listed on the Johannesburg Stock Exchange under the ticker GND. The two business divisions are: Freight Services and Financial Services. The company operates in logistics, transportation, freight movement, and related industries in South Africa and has over 100 years of operating history.

== Branch network ==
As of January 2020, Grindrod Bank maintains a branch network in the cities of Johannesburg, Durban, Pretoria and Cape Town at the following locations:

1. Durban Head Office & Branch - 1st Floor North, 20 Kingsmead Boulevard, Kingsmead Office Park, Durban
2. Johannesburg Branch - 4th Floor, Grindrod Tower, 8a Protea Place, Sandton, Johannesburg
3. Pretoria Branch - 1st Floor, Building 21, Oxford Office Park, 3 Bauhinia Street, Centurion, Pretoria
4. Cape Town Branch - 3rd floor, The Terraces, 25 Protea Road, Claremont, Cape Town

== Acquisition by African Bank ==
In May 2022, South African media reported that African Bank had offered ZAR:1.5 billion (approx. USD:97 million) to acquire Grindrod Bank and its holding company Grindrod Financial Holdings. The deal requires both shareholder and regulatory approvals.

== See also ==
- List of banks in South Africa
- Reserve Bank of South Africa
- Economy of South Africa
