= Ewbank (name) =

Ewbank is Germanic surname. Notable people with the name include:

== As a given name ==
- Andrew Ewbank Burn (1864–1927), English clergyman

== As a surname ==
- Giovanna Ewbank (born 1986), Brazilian actress
- Inga-Stina Ewbank (1932–2004), Swedish educator
- John Ewbank (climber) (1948–2013), Australian rock climber
- John Ewbank (composer) (born 1968), Dutch composer, lyricist, and record producer
- John Wilson Ewbank (1799–1847), English painter
- Louis Ewbank (1864–1953), Justice of the Indiana Supreme Court
- Weeb Ewbank (1907–1998), American football coach

== See also ==
- Eubank, a surname
