= Super Group Limited =

South African logistics and automotive holding company

- Type: Public
- Traded as: JSE: SPG
- ISIN: ZAE000161832
- Industry: Logistics; Automotive retail
- Incorporated: 16 June 1943; 83 years ago
- Founded: 1986; 40 years ago
- Headquarters: Sandton, Gauteng, South Africa
- Area served: Sub-Saharan Africa; Europe
- Key people: Valentine Chitalu (Chairperson); Peter Mountford (CEO); Colin Brown (CFO)
- Services: Supply chain management Freight transport and distribution Warehousing and logistics Fleet management and leasing Vehicle sales and servicing Equipment leasing
- Revenue: ▲ R45.83 billion (2026)
- Operating income: ▲ R2.37 billion (2026)
- Net income: ▼ R525.42 million (2026)
- Total assets: ▲ R40.18 billion (2026)
- Total equity: ▲ R13.58 billion (2026)
- Number of employees: 15,974 (2026)
- Divisions: Supply Chain; Fleet Solutions; Dealerships
- Subsidiaries: Super Group Holdings; Fleet Africa; SG Freight; SG Convenience; Digistics; DIG
- Website: supergroup.co.za

Super Group is a South African logistics and automotive holding company, founded in 1986. Listed on the JSE and based in Sandton, Gauteng, Super Group has operations spanning sectors including supply chain management, warehousing, fleet management, and vehicle sales.

As of 2026, the company has operations across Africa and Europe, and employs around 16,000 people.

== History ==
Super Group was founded on 4 December 1986. In 1987, the company acquired Super Rent, an auto rental company operating around 150 vehicles, marking Super Group's expansion into commercial vehicle rentals. During the following years, the group expanded into truck maintenance, vehicle leasing, freight transport, and distribution through acquisitions and the establishment of new businesses.

By 1996, Super Group had grown into one of South Africa's largest privately owned transport businesses, with approximately 2,500 vehicles and 2,000 employees. In September that year, the company obtained a listing on the Johannesburg Stock Exchange through a reverse takeover of the listed automotive dealership group Motolink. It subsequently expanded into cross-border freight logistics, automotive retail, security services, and financial services through a series of acquisitions.

During the 2000s, Super Group diversified beyond its core transport operations, acquiring businesses in automotive parts retail, vehicle manufacturing, insurance, and industrial equipment. Several of these investments performed poorly, contributing to mounting financial difficulties. The company was particularly affected by the 2008 financial crisis, declining vehicle sales, high debt levels, and accounting irregularities. By early 2009, Super Group had reported substantial financial losses and announced plans to restructure its operations and recapitalize the business.

In July 2009, Peter Mountford was appointed CEO. Under Mountford, Super Group undertook a major restructuring, including a rights issue to strengthen its balance sheet and the disposal of non-core businesses. These included its interests in Mica Hardware, Emerald Insurance, industrial equipment, and automotive parts retailer AutoZone, which was sold in 2010. The restructuring refocused the company on supply chain management, fleet services, and automotive dealerships.

During the 2010s, Super Group pursued international expansion, particularly in the fleet management and logistics sectors. In March 2014, its Australian fleet management subsidiary, SG Fleet, was listed on the Australian Securities Exchange, while Super Group retained a controlling interest. In 2015, the company acquired a 75% stake in German logistics operator inTime, expanding its operations into continental Europe. The acquisition was partly financed through a R900 million rights issue.

In September 2021, SG Fleet acquired the Australian and New Zealand operations of LeasePlan, substantially expanding its fleet leasing and management business. The transaction was one of the group's largest international acquisitions and strengthened its position in the Australasian fleet management industry.

In December 2024, Super Group announced plans to dispose of its 53.6% interest in SG Fleet as part of a broader strategic restructuring. The transaction was completed in April 2025, generating approximately R7.47 billion in proceeds. The company used part of the proceeds to reduce debt and distributed approximately R5.54 billion to shareholders through a special dividend. In July 2025, it also completed the sale of its German inTime logistics business to Mutares.

In March 2026, Super Group acquired a 70% interest in DIG, a South African plant and equipment rental business serving the mining industry, for an initial R448 million, with additional contingent consideration. The acquisition expanded the group's fleet solutions operations into mining equipment rental. During the 2026 financial year, the group also expanded its South African automotive dealership network, particularly its representation of Chinese and Indian vehicle manufacturers.

During the 2026 financial year, Super Group added 11 vehicle dealerships to its SA network, representing brands including Chery, Geely, GWM, Jetour, Lepas, Omoda, Jaecoo, Mahindra, and Tata. By June 2026, the group operated 31 dealerships representing Chinese and Indian manufacturers, with its South African dealership division generating R11.96 billion in annual revenue.

== Operations ==
As of 2026, Super Group operates across sub-Saharan Africa, the United Kingdom, and Europe, with its businesses organized into three main divisions – Supply Chain, Fleet Solutions, and Dealerships. Its operations encompass freight transportation, distribution, warehousing, fleet management, equipment rental, and automotive retail. The group operates through a network of subsidiaries and associated businesses serving the mining, manufacturing, retail, automotive, and consumer goods industries.

=== Supply chain ===
The company's Supply Chain division provides freight transportation, warehousing, distribution, and supply chain management services across Southern Africa and Europe. Its activities include road freight transport, cross-border logistics, freight forwarding, customs clearing, cold chain distribution, and third-party logistics services. In the 2026 financial year, the division generated revenue of R20.47 billion, making it the group's second-largest division by revenue.

In Southern Africa, the division operates through businesses including SG Freight, SG Coal, SG Convenience, and Digistics. These provide bulk commodity transport, fuel distribution, refrigerated transport, warehousing, and distribution services. Its customers include mining companies, manufacturers, retailers, and quick-service restaurant chains. The group's cross-border logistics operations extend into countries including Zimbabwe, Zambia, Mozambique, Malawi, and the DRC.

The European supply chain operations include Ader, a Spanish logistics business providing transport, distribution, home delivery, and logistics services. Super Group also retained an interest in British logistics operator AMCO during 2026, although it classified the business as held for sale following financial losses and its decision to reduce exposure to European automotive logistics.

=== Fleet solutions ===
Super Group's Fleet Solutions division provides vehicle leasing, fleet management, and equipment rental services, primarily in South Africa. Its Fleet Africa subsidiary manages commercial, passenger, and specialized vehicle fleets for public and private sector clients. Services include vehicle procurement, financing, maintenance, fleet administration, telematics, and vehicle replacement.

=== Automotive dealerships ===
In South Africa, Super Group operates an automotive retail network through its Super Group Dealerships division. As of 2026, the division represented 35 vehicle brands across 66 dealerships nationwide, offering new and used vehicle sales, servicing, parts, and vehicle finance and insurance services. Its franchises include established manufacturers such as Toyota, Ford, GWM, and Lepas.

The company also operates a dealership network in the UK, primarily representing Ford. Its British operations sell new and used vehicles and provide servicing, maintenance, spare parts, and vehicle finance and insurance services. The group also operates commercial vehicle dealerships and related automotive services.

== Corporate social responsibility ==
Super Group operates a corporate social responsibility (CSR) program focused on education, skills development, healthcare, food distribution, and community development. Its initiatives include bursaries, vocational training, youth development programs, and support for charitable organizations. In the 2026 financial year, the company reported spending R19.83 million on corporate social investment, compared with R14.4 million in 2025.

== See also ==
- Logistics in South Africa
- Automotive industry in South Africa
