= H. Gilbert Welch =

American doctor

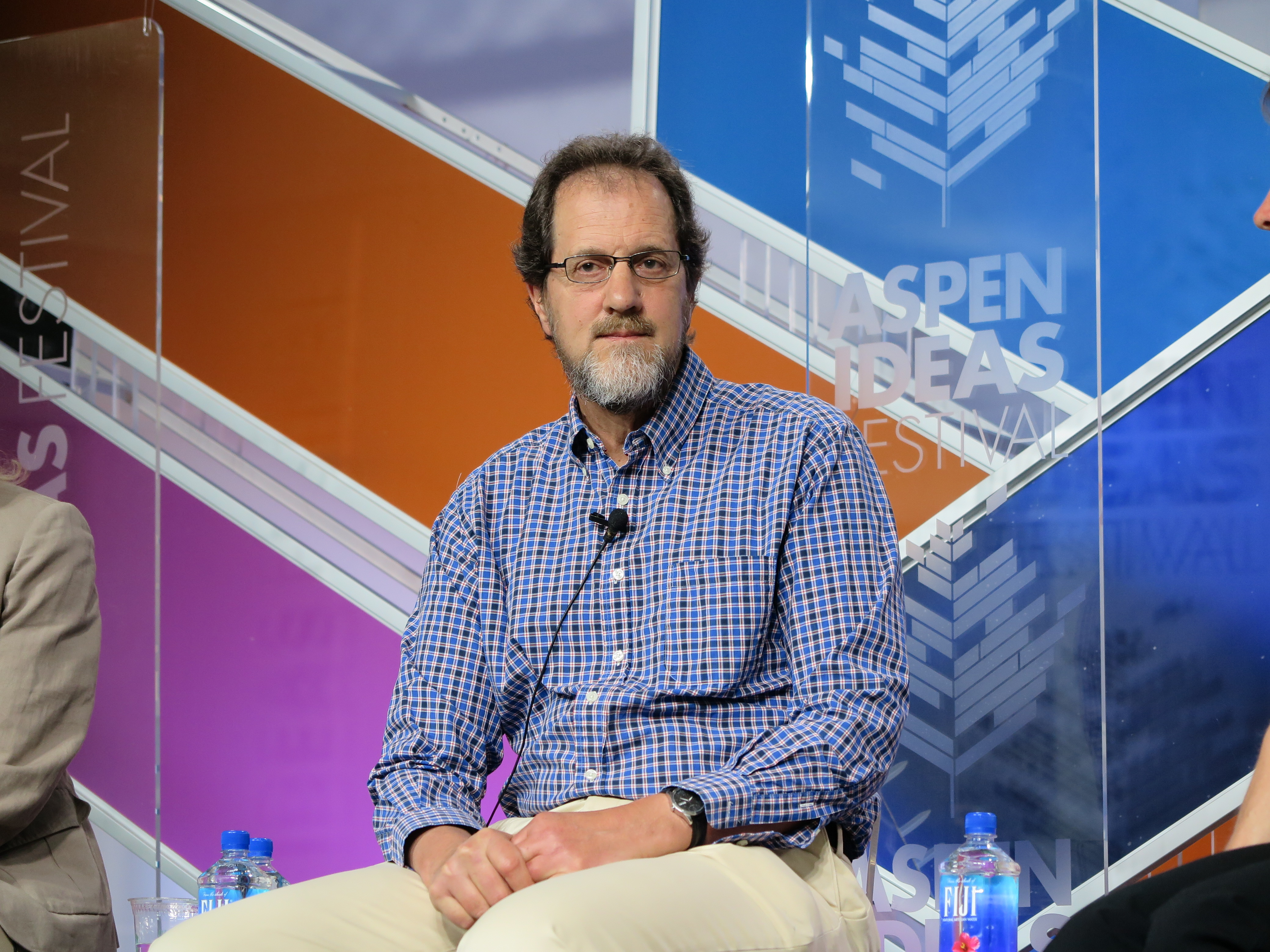
H. Gilbert Welch in 2015

H. Gilbert Welch is an American academic physician and cancer researcher. He was an internist at the Veterans Administration Medical Center in White River Junction, Vermont, as well as a professor of medicine at the Dartmouth Institute for Health Policy and Clinical Practice. In September 2018, Welch resigned from Dartmouth College after a 20-month long research misconduct investigation at Dartmouth concluded he had committed plagiarism.

== Education ==
Welch received his BA from Harvard University in 1976, his MD from the University of Cincinnati in 1982, and his MPH from the University of Washington in 1990.

== Career ==
Welch joined Dartmouth Medical School as an assistant professor in 1990. He was promoted to associate professor there in 1995, and to full professor in 2000.

== Research ==
Welch is known for his research into cancer screening. In 2012, Welch co-authored a study which found that mammography was having little to no impact on breast cancer death rates. The study also concluded that substantial overdiagnosis was associated with mammographic screening, "accounting for nearly a third of all newly diagnosed breast cancers." In 2014, Welch and two other researchers published a perspective piece in the New England Journal of Medicine examining trends in thyroid cancer incidence and mortality in South Korea. The piece found that thyroid-cancer mortality has not changed appreciably there from 1993 to 2011, despite the rate of diagnoses for this type of cancer increasing by a factor of 15 during the same time period.

In 2016, he led a study which concluded that women were more likely to be diagnosed with a small tumor that will never increase in size through mammography than they are to have a dangerous tumor detected through the practice. This 2016 study, which included two staff members of the National Cancer Institute (Barnett Kramer and Philip Prorok), was found to have contained uncredited data from a colleague, Samir Soneji. In 2018, after a 20-month investigation, Dartmouth College determined that Welch had "engaged in research misconduct, namely, plagiarism, by knowingly, intentionally, or recklessly appropriating the ideas, processes, results or words of Complainants without giving them appropriate credit, and that these actions represented a significant departure from accepted practices of the relevant research community." Welch disputed the investigation's finding, telling Retraction Watch that "the underlying data are publicly available — all the analyses, all the figures and all the writing in the article are my co-authors' and mine." Dartmouth College considered Welch's claims in a formal appeal process before concluding he engaged in research misconduct, specifically plagiarism.

== Views on early detection ==
Welch is critical of the concept of early detection in medicine, stating that "we have exaggerated the benefits of medical care, and we've underplayed — or ignored entirely — the harms. This is particularly true when it comes to early detection." He has also argued that mammograms tend to detect abnormalities that are "not destined to cause them [women who undergo screening] any problems" but are still labeled cancer in these women.

== Books ==
- Should I be Tested for Cancer? Maybe Not and Here's Why (University of California Press, 2004)
- Overdiagnosed: Making People Sick in the Pursuit of Health (Beacon Press, 2011)
- Less Medicine, More Health: 7 Assumptions That Drive Too Much Medical Care (Beacon Press, 2015)
