= Old Mutual =

Pan-African investment, savings, insurance, and banking group

Old Mutual Ltd
- Type: Limited company
- Traded as: JSE: OMU; LSE: OMU; ZSE: OMU
- Industry: Financial services
- Founded: 17 May 1845; 181 years ago (Cape Town, Cape Colony)
- Founders: John Fairbairn; Saul Solomon
- Headquarters: Cape Town, South Africa
- Area served: Africa
- Key people: Trevor Manuel, Chairman; Iain Williamson, CEO; Casper Troskie, CFO
- Products: Life insurance Savings and investment Asset management Banking; Short-term insurance
- Revenue: R109,877 million (2018)
- Operating income: R9,963 million (2018)
- AUM: R1.04 trillion (2018)
- Number of employees: 31,000 (2018)
- Subsidiaries: OM Bank (100%); 10X Investments (Majority)
- Website: www.oldmutual.com

Old Mutual (officially Old Mutual Limited) is a South African investment, savings, insurance, and banking group, operating across Africa. Headquartered in Cape Town, the company is listed on the Johannesburg Stock Exchange, the Zimbabwe Stock Exchange, the Namibian Stock Exchange, and the Botswana Stock Exchange.

The company operates a digital bank subsidiary, OM Bank, which was launched to the South African public in 2025. It also holds a majority shareholding in Cape Town-based investment firm 10X Investments - a stake it acquired in 2026.

Old Mutual was founded in South Africa by John Fairbairn in 1845 and was demutualised and listed on the London Stock Exchange and other stock exchanges in 1999.

The company introduced a new strategy called 'managed separation' that entailed the separation of its four businesses – Old Mutual Emerging Markets, Nedbank, UK-based Old Mutual Wealth and Boston-based Old Mutual Asset Management (OMAM) – into standalone entities in 2018. This led to the demerger of Quilter plc (formerly 'Old Mutual Wealth') and the unbundling of its shareholding in Nedbank.

The business, which is now largely based in South Africa, provides sponsorship and supports bursaries at South African universities.

== History ==
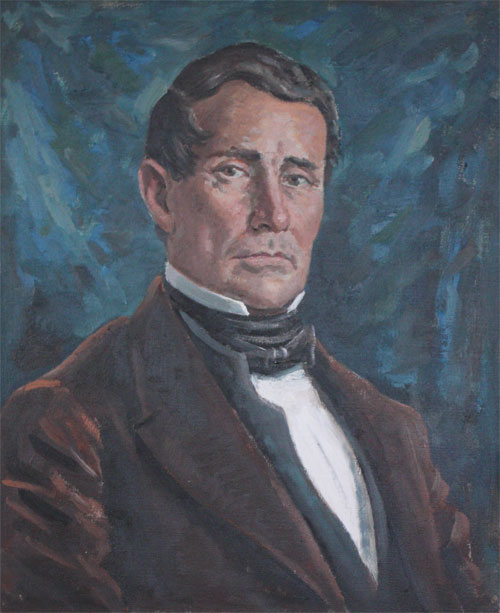
John Fairbairn, Founder and first Chairman

The company was founded in 1845 as a mutual insurance company by John Fairbairn, together with several other prominent Cape Town figures, such as the liberal politician Saul Solomon. The original name The Mutual Life Assurance Society of the Cape of Good Hope was changed to The South Africa Mutual Life Assurance Society in 1885.

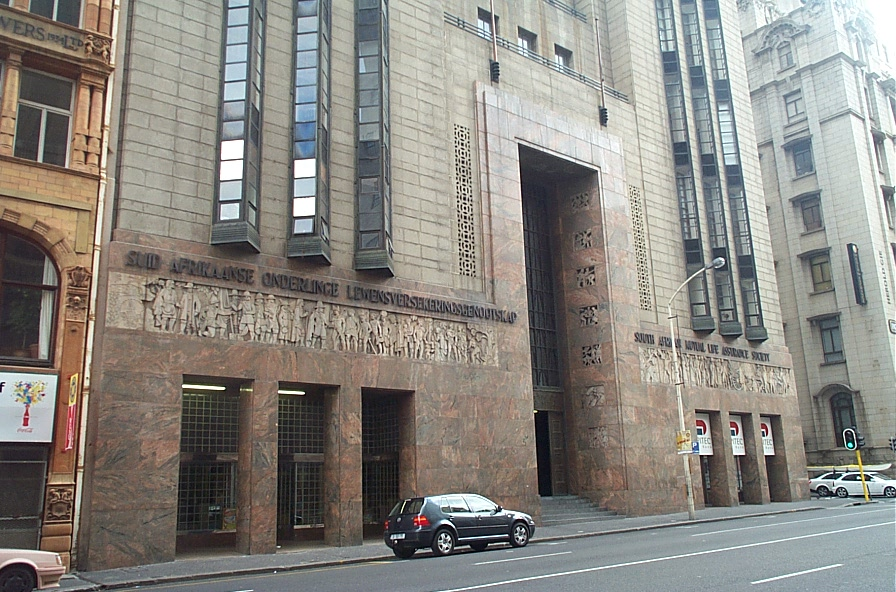
Original Old Mutual headquarters in Cape Town. The building now serves as residential accommodation.

In 1939, the Old Mutual headquarters opened in the art deco-style Mutual Building ('Mutualgebou' in Afrikaans), in Darling Street, Cape Town CBD. The building has since been converted into condos, and renamed Mutual Heights. In 1956, Old Mutual relocated its head office to Mutualpark in Pinelands, at that time the largest office block in the southern hemisphere.

Old Mutual acquired a major shareholding in the newly formed Mutual & Federal in 1970, acquiring the remaining shares in 2009. Mutual & Federal was renamed as Old Mutual Insure on 5 June 2017, and is now a part of the Old Mutual Emerging Markets business.

In 1973, Old Mutual acquired shareholding in Nedcor Bank (renamed the Nedbank Group in 2005).

In 1997 and 1998, the company acquired UK stockbrokers Capel-Cure Myers and Albert E. Sharp respectively, which then merged to form Capel-Cure Sharp.

By 1999, it was demutualised and the company listed on the London, Johannesburg, Zimbabwe, Malawi and Namibian Stock Exchanges as Old Mutual. Old Mutual also established a head office in London.

In 2000, it bought the Gerrard Group, a financial services concern, for $857 million. Capel-Cure Sharp subsequently merged with Greig Middleton, Gerrard Group's private client business. Old Mutual sold Gerrard to Barclays Bank plc in 2003.

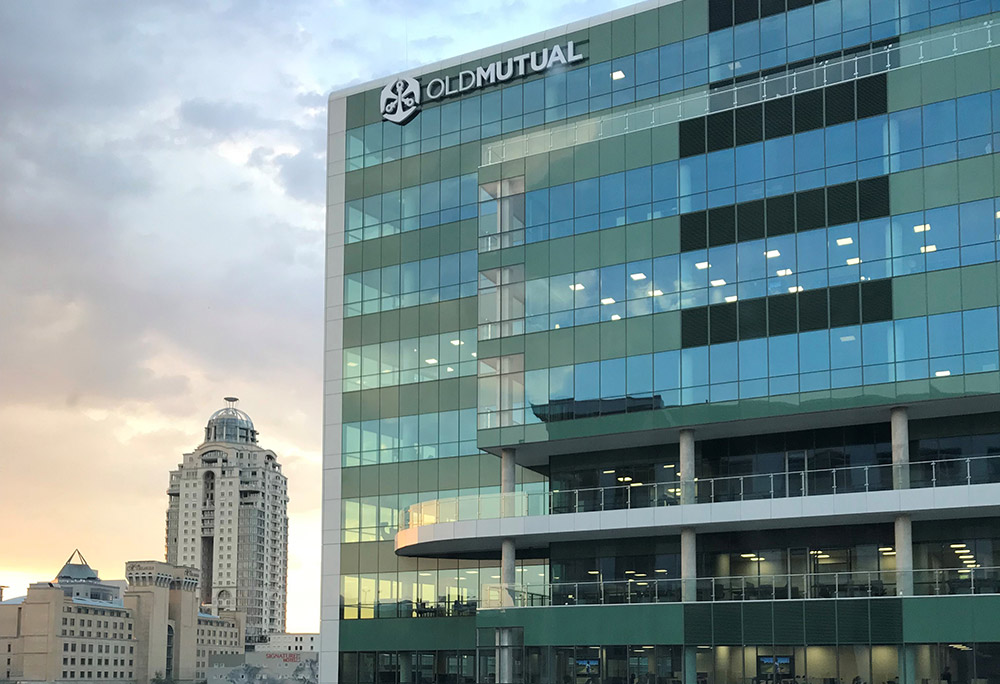
Old Mutual Head Office in Sandton.

Later in 2000, Old Mutual purchased United Asset Management, based in Boston, for US$1.46 billion in cash and assumed ownership of UAM net debt of around US$769 million, thus acquiring a large and diverse US-based asset manager. Among the holdings of UAM were the PBHG Funds of Pilgrim Baxter & Associates. In 2003, PBA was one of many companies who faced charges related to market timing brought by the U.S. Securities and Exchange Commission (SEC) and the Attorney General of New York. Ultimately, the PBHG Funds (renamed Liberty Ridge) were absorbed into the Old Mutual Funds group.

In 2005, Mike Levett retired as chairman and was succeeded by Christopher Collins. In the same year a Black Economic Empowerment deal was introduced at Old Mutual South Africa, Nedbank and Mutual & Federal.

In 2006, Old Mutual acquired the Swedish insurer, Skandia, in a $6.5billion deal, bringing additional business in the United Kingdom, several other countries in Europe, Latin America, the Far East and Australia (that Old Mutual has since exited). Old Mutual also announced its Black Economic Empowerment deal in Namibia.

Patrick O'Sullivan became chairman of Old Mutual in 2010, succeeding Christopher Collins. The same year HSBC backed away from its plan to acquire 70% of Nedbank, including Old Mutual's 53% share. In 2011, Old Mutual sold US Life to Harbinger Group Inc. for $350 million.

Old Mutual sold its Nordic operations to Skandia Liv for £2.1 billion in 2012.

In 2013, Old Mutual strengthened operations in Africa with the acquisition of Provident Life Assurance in Ghana and Oceanic Life in Nigeria.

Also in 2013, Old Mutual acquired the Fairheads Trust Company, one of the oldest trust companies in South Africa, and established the Old Mutual Wealth Trust Company. Old Mutual Wealth Trust Company has two divisions: Old Mutual Wealth Fiduciary and the Old Mutual Wealth Family Office, that continues to work closely with the Fairheads Trust individuals and families with whom it has built relationships over the past 90 years. However, Old Mutual did not acquire Fairheads Benefit Services.

As of January 2014, with the additions of attorney Adiba Ighodaro, daughter of Nigeria's 3rd Secretary-General of the Commonwealth of Nations, Chief Emeka Anyaoku, and former Wall Street powerhouse Zoe Cruz, Old Mutual's Board became 30% female represented.

In 2014 Skandia Colombia was renamed to Old Mutual Colombia, Provident Life Assurance to Old Mutual Ghana and Skandia UK became Old Mutual Wealth. Later in 2014, Old Mutual Wealth sold Skandia Germany, Skandia Austria and Skandia Poland.

May 2015 saw Old Mutual celebrating 170 years of operations and Bruce Hemphill becoming group chief executive in November.

In March 2016, Old Mutual plc announced a new strategy for the group, called 'managed separation', that sought to unlock and create value for shareholders. The strategy would entail the separation of its four businesses – Old Mutual Emerging Markets, Nedbank, UK-based Old Mutual Wealth and Boston-based Old Mutual Asset Management (OMAM) – into standalone entities. In August 2016, Old Mutual Investment Group signed a deal with the Nigeria Sovereign Investment Authority to invest $700 million in hospitality, retail, commercial sectors, and food security, and sold its Italian wealth management arm to the ERGO Group for €278 million.

A significant strategic milestone was reached during the first half of 2017 with the announcement of a series of transactions that would reduce Old Mutual plc's stake in OM Asset Management (OMAM) to 5.5%. OMAM is now independent from Old Mutual plc. Additionally, in 2017 Old Mutual completed the sale of Indian-based Kotak Mahindra Old Mutual Life Insurance Ltd.

The company announced in November 2017 that Old Mutual Wealth would be demerged as Quilter plc in 2018.

In June 2018 the company executed the 'managed separation' strategy. Old Mutual plc shares were de-listed and Old Mutual Limited and Quilter plc, now independent businesses, listed on the Johannesburg, Zimbabwe, Malawi, Namibian and London Stock Exchanges. On 15 October 2018, Old Mutual unbundled their majority shareholding in Nedbank, marking a distribution worth approximately R43.2 billion to Old Mutual shareholders, and the completion of Old Mutual Group's managed separation. Old Mutual's head office moved to No 1 Mutual Place, Sandton in the same year.

In April 2019 the company sold its Latin American businesses to Lily Bermuda Capital, a wholly owned subsidiary of Singapore-based CMIG International Holding. This was followed in May by Peter Moyo being suspended as CEO due to "a material breakdown in trust and confidence between him and the board". Iain Williamson, previous COO, was appointed as acting CEO.

=== Launch of OM Bank ===
In 2022, Old Mutual applied for a South African banking license. This was granted by South Africa's Prudential Authority in 2024, whereafter digital-only OM Bank was formed as a subsidiary of Old Mutual, under Section 16 of the Banks Act.

OM Bank launched to the public in September 2025, confirmed in November of the same year that it had reached 150,000 customers, and announced a goal in January 2026 of reaching break-even by the company's 2028 financial year.

=== Recent developments ===
In January 2026, the South African Competition Tribunal unconditionally approved Old Mutual's acquisition of a majority shareholding in Cape Town-based investment firm 10X Investments. The deal, worth R2.2 billion, shifts Old Mutual from joint to sole controller of 10X, and follows a period of gradual investment in 10X by Old Mutual Private Equity, which began in 2014. It comprises Old Mutual Wealth acquiring 10X Investments from its sister company, Old Mutual Private Equity (OMPE), and independent company DiGame Investments.

10X was founded in 2008, and at the time of the deal, had over R68 billion in assets under management and over 60,000 clients. Old Mutual stated that it was acquiring the increased shareholding in 10X in order to increase its exposure to passive investments in South Africa.

== Operations ==
The structure of the business is as follows:

- Old Mutual South Africa
  - Old Mutual Investment Group
  - Old Mutual Insure
  - Old Mutual Wealth (South Africa)
- Old Mutual Botswana
- Old Mutual Ghana
- Old Mutual Malawi
- Old Mutual Namibia
- Old Mutual Nigeria
- Old Mutual Swaziland
- Old Mutual Zimbabwe
- Old Mutual East Africa Group
  - Old Mutual Holdings
  - Faulu Microfinance Bank Limited
- Old Mutual-Guodian (China)

== Sponsorships ==
Old Mutual and its subsidiaries are involved in a number of sponsorships worldwide:

- The Old Mutual National Choir Festival (South Africa)
- The Old Mutual Victory Race (Namibia)
- Go2Berg
- Music at the Gardens

== Bursaries ==
Old Mutual South Africa awards a number of bursaries every year for exceptional matriculants and actuarial students at South African universities. It also offers partly qualified actuarial employees study leave before actuarial exams. Actuarial students are also typically awarded salary increases following exam passes.

== Responsible business ==
Old Mutual participates in the United Nations Global Compact (UNGC), as well as the Carbon Disclosure Project.

== Old Mutual Amazing Voices ==
Old Mutual Amazing Voices is a pan-African music competition reality television series produced by Destiny TV and launched by Old Mutual for DStv and M-Net's various local interest channels across Africa in their respective regions.

== See also ==
- Old Mutual Holdings
- Real People Group
