= Financial Sector Conduct Authority (South Africa) =

Market conduct regulator of financial institutions in South Africa

Agency overview
- Formed: April 1, 2018; 8 years ago
- Preceding agency: Financial Services Board (South Africa)
- Jurisdiction: South Africa
- Headquarters: Pretoria, South Africa
- Minister responsible: Enoch Godongwana (Minister of Finance)
- Agency executive: Unathi Kamlana (Commissioner)
- Website: www.fsca.co.za

The Financial Sector Conduct Authority (FSCA) is the South African financial institutions market conduct regulator and a successor agency to the Financial Services Board (South Africa).

The FCSA was established in 2018, through the promulgation of the Financial Sector Regulation Act 9 of 2017. The act also established the Prudential Authority, which is responsible for prudential regulation in South Africa. The goal of the Act was, among other things, to promote the fair treatment of customers by financial institutions operating in South Africa.

The FSCA is headed by a Commissioner, and the body reports to the Minister of Finance, who leads the National Treasury.

South African companies can apply to the FSCA to become licensed Financial Services Providers, which is a requirement under South African law to practice as such. Consumers can use the FSCA's website to check if a firm is authorized to practice in its field.

== See also ==
- List of financial supervisory authorities by country
- Banking in South Africa
- Economy of South Africa
