= Eubanks, Virginia =

Unincorporated community in Virginia, United States

- Unincorporated community
- Location within Northern Virginia Location within Virginia Location within the United States
- Coordinates: 39°9′30″N 77°46′11″W
- Country: United States
- State: Virginia
- County: Loudoun
- Time zone: UTC−5 (Eastern (EST))
  - Summer (DST): UTC−4 (EDT)
- GNIS feature ID: 1499393

Eubanks is an unincorporated community in northern Loudoun County, Virginia, United States. Eubanks is located on Woodgrove Road (VA 719) north of Round Hill and south of the South Fork Catoctin Creek.
