= Serge Belamant =

South African entrepreneur (born 1953)

Serge Christian Pierre Belamant
- Born: September 22, 1953 (age 73); Tulle, France
- Occupations: Entrepreneur, inventor
- Known for: Universal Electronic Payment System (UEPS); Chip Offline Pre-authorised Card (COPAC)
- Title: Founder of Net1 UEPS Technologies; Co-founder & chair of Zilch

Serge Belamant (born 1953) is a French-born South African entrepreneur best known for designing the Universal Electronic Payment System (UEPS) and the Chip Offline Pre-authorised Card (COPAC).

He founded the cash-payments company Net1 UEPS Technologies in 1989, led it through dual listings on the NASDAQ and the Johannesburg Stock Exchange, and oversaw the contentious welfare-payments contract with the South African Social Security Agency (SASSA) until his retirement in 2017. Since 2018 he has been non-executive chair of London-based buy-now-pay-later fintech Zilch.

== Early life and education ==
Belamant moved from France to South Africa with his family in 1967 and matriculated from Highlands North Boys' High School, Johannesburg. In 1972 he entered the University of the Witwatersrand to study civil engineering but switched to computer science and applied mathematics in his second year. He left the university without a degree and later took short courses in information systems at the University of South Africa (UNISA).

== Early career and SASWITCH (1981–1989) ==
Belamant worked for Control Data Corporation as a systems analyst for a decade before joining SASWITCH Ltd in 1985. Economic sanctions had left the consortium's national ATM network dependent on unsupported Christian Rovsing computers. Belamant led a rebuild on fault-tolerant Stratus hardware and wrote protocol-translation software that allowed fourteen banks to connect without altering their host systems.

By 1988 SASWITCH was handling about three million ATM transactions a month, according to the Competition Commission. The switch—now run by BankservAfrica—remains the backbone of South Africa's shared ATM network.

== Net1 UEPS Technologies (1989–2017) ==
=== Founding and UEPS ===
In 1989, Serge Belamant developed the Universal Electronic Payment System (UEPS), enabling secure, real-time transactions even in areas with limited connectivity. In the same year, he founded NET1 UEPS Technologies Inc., serving as its CEO and Director.

=== COPAC for VISA ===
In 1995, VISA tasked Belamant with designing the Chip Offline Pre-authorized Card (COPAC), a technology still widely used in chip-enabled credit and debit cards. A year later, he listed his company APLITEC (Applied Technology Holdings Limited) on the Johannesburg Stock Exchange.

=== Listings and acquisitions ===
In 1999, Belamant acquired Cash Payment Services (CPS) from First National Bank of South Africa, modernizing its welfare payment system to serve millions in rural areas. In 2005, he led Net1 Technologies to an IPO, listing it as Net1 UEPS Technologies Inc. on the Nasdaq. A secondary listing on the Johannesburg Stock Exchange (JSE) followed in 2008.

=== SASSA contract ===
Under Belamant's leadership, NET1 managed welfare payments for the South African Social Security Agency (SASSA), handling payments for over 10 million beneficiaries monthly. Despite criticism over handling the SASSA contract, investigations by the U.S. Department of Justice and the South African Constitutional Court found no wrongdoing.

== Zilch (2018–present) ==
Belamant co-founded London-based "buy-now-pay-later" firm Zilch Technology in 2018 and serves as non-executive chair. Zilch reported £145 million in annual-recurring revenue and 4.5 million customers in January 2025.

== Patents ==
Belamant is listed as inventor on more than a dozen payment-security patents, including:

- "Funds transfer system" (US RE36,788, 2000) – the basis for UEPS.
- "Financial transactions with a varying PIN" (WO 2014/037869, 2014).
