= Prudential Authority =

South African government agency responsible for prudential regulation

Agency overview
- Formed: April 1, 2018; 8 years ago
- Preceding agency: Financial Services Board
- Jurisdiction: South Africa
- Status: Active
- Headquarters: Pretoria, Gauteng, South Africa
- Agency executives: Fundi Tshazibana (CEO); Lesetja Kganyago (Chairperson)
- Parent agency: The South African Reserve Bank
- Key document: The Prudential Authority Regulatory Strategy
- Website: resbank.co.za/en/home/publications/prudential-authority

The Prudential Authority (PA) is the South African government agency responsible for the country's prudential regulation (the supervision and regulation of its banks and other financial institutions).

The agency was established in 2018, through the promulgation of the Financial Sector Regulation Act 9 of 2017. The act also established the FSCA, which is responsible for the country's financial institutions market conduct regulation.

The two new agencies were previously joined, as the Financial Services Board. The PA is within the administration of the South African Reserve Bank. As such, its processes align with those of the SARB, and the PA is audited by the SARB's Internal Audit Department.

As per its mandate, the Prudential Authority is responsible for regulating South Africa's banks (of all types), insurers, co-operative financial institutions, financial conglomerates, and certain market infrastructures.

To ensure it follows its mandate, the Prudential Authority publishes a Regulatory Strategy. The strategy provides public information about the PA's approach to regulation and supervision, guiding principles for its regulatory and supervisory decisions, major priorities over a three-year period, and the outcomes it intends to achieve in order to realize those priorities.

The PA is the body that issues banking licenses in South Africa, and manages the registration and deregistration of financial institutions. It is also responsible for issuing sanctions against financial institutions for noncompliance with applicable financial acts.

== Priorities ==
In its 2025 - 2030 Regulatory Strategy, the PA stated that it had the following six priorities:

- Strengthening and enhancing the regulation and supervision of deposit-taking institutions, thereby assisting with maintaining the stability and integrity of the South African financial system
- Implementing and enhancing the financial conglomerate regulatory and supervisory framework
- Strengthening and enhancing the prudential regulation and supervision of market infrastructures
- Strengthening and enhancing the regulatory and supervisory frameworks for insurers
- Enhancing the supervision of and combating financial crime, such as money laundering
- Developing and implementing approaches to the prudential regulation and supervision of retirement funds, collective investment schemes, friendly societies, and medical schemes

== Structure ==
The PA is headed by a Committee, comprising the Governor of the South African Reserve Bank (SARB) as chairperson, the PA's CEO (who is also a Deputy Governor of the SARB), and two other Deputy Governors of the SARB. The four heads of department (HoDs) of the PA, as well as the Head of the SARB's Financial Stability Department, are standing invitees to Prudential Committee meetings.

== See also ==
- List of financial supervisory authorities by country
- Banking in South Africa
- Economy of South Africa
