= Ubank =

South African Bank

Ubank Limited
- Industry: Banking
- Founded: 1975
- Headquarters: Midrand, Gauteng (City of Johannesburg Metropolitan Municipality), South Africa
- Number of locations: Several branches
- Services: Microfinance
- Parent: African Bank
- Website: www.ubank.co.za

Ubank Limited (formerly known as Teba Bank) is a South African bank operating in the microfinance sector which mainly targets lower-income blue-collar workers, especially those in the mining sector.

== History ==
Teba Limited (stylised as TEBA), which was involved with the South African mining industry, was founded in 1912. The predecessor of the bank was the Teba Savings Fund (also known as Teba Cash) that was established in 1976 and processed the salaries of miners working at gold and platinum mines. In 1983, the savings fund became a separate company from Teba Limited, and was renamed as Teba Bank after obtaining a banking license from the South African Reserve Bank in 2000.

In 2002, the bank launched the Teba Bank Funeral Plan catering to miners.

In October 2010, the bank was renamed as Ubank.

In 2022, The bank was placed under curatorship by the Reserve Bank of South Africa to "proactively mitigate the adverse consequences on Ubank's depositors, and to preserve the stability of the South African banking and financial services sector as a whole."

UBank now fall under African Bank.

== Operations ==
The bank chiefly operates in the rural areas of South Africa, with a large majority of its clientele identifying as low-income miners; in fact, according to a 2002 profile of the bank in Business in Africa, for many years "Teba Bank was the only financial institution thousands of workers toiling in South African mines knew." According to a 2010 report, the bank had some 500,000 clients, half of whom worked in the mining sector. It has over a hundred branches and around 37 ATMs. Its head office is in Midrand, Gauteng.
