= National Bureau of Statistics =

National Bureau of Statistics or State Bureau of Statistics may refer to:

- National Bureau of Statistics of China
- National Bureau of Statistics of Moldova
- National Bureau of Statistics, Nigeria
- National Bureau of Statistics of Tanzania
- Australian Bureau of Statistics
- State Bureau of Statistics (Croatia)

== See also ==
- List of national and international statistical services
