= Financial Services Board (South Africa) =

Financial regulatory authority

Agency overview
- Formed: 1990
- Preceding agency: None
- Dissolved: 2018
- Superseding agency: Financial Sector Conduct Authority (South Africa) (FSCA) and Prudential Authority (PA)
- Jurisdiction: South Africa
- Headquarters: Pretoria, South Africa
- Employees: 411 (2009)
- Agency executive: Dube Tshidi
- Website: www.fsb.co.za

The Financial Services Board (FSB) was the government of South Africa's financial regulatory agency responsible for the non-banking financial services industry in South Africa from 1990 to 2018. On 1 April 2018, its responsibilities were split into two new agencies the Financial Sector Conduct Authority (FSCA) for conduct regulation and the Prudential Authority (PA) for prudential regulation.

Prior to its dissolution, it was an independent body which had a mandate to supervise and regulate the non-bank financial services industry in the public interest. This included the regulation of the biggest stock exchange in Africa the Johannesburg Stock Exchange.

== History ==
The FSB was established in 1991 based on recommendations by the Van der Horst Committee to create an independent body to supervise and regulate the non-banking financial services industry. A number of additional acts later expanded and increased the role of the FSB. These included;

In September 2004, the Financial Advisory and Intermediary Services Act (FAIS) expanded the mandate of the FSB to include aspects of market conduct in the banking industry.

Financial Intelligence Centre Act (2001) and subsequent amendments have added responsibilities to the FSB to combat money laundering.

=== Reorganization into Prudential Authority and Financial Sector Conduct Authority ===
On 21 August 2017, the Financial Sector Regulation Act (FSR Act) was signed into law.

Among other changes. the FSR Act created a prudential regulator, the Prudential Authority (PA), and a market conduct regulator, the Financial Sector Conduct Authority (FSCA.

- The PA is responsible for regulating banks, insurers, cooperative financial institutions, financial conglomerates, and certain market infrastructures.
- FSCA was given the mandate of market conduct regulator of financial institutions that provide financial products and financial services, and financial institutions that are licensed in terms of a financial sector law, including banks, insurers, retirement funds and administrators, and market infrastructures.

On April 1, 2018, the PA assumed the FSB's responsibilities for non-bank financial institution prudential supervision and the FSB's responsibilities for market conduct were assumed by FSCA

== Responsibilities and functions ==
The FSB's stated vision was "to promote and maintain a sound financial investment environment in South Africa"

It was responsible for all non-bank financial intermediaries, which included;

- Capital Markets
- Collective Investment Schemes
- Financial Services Providers
- Insurers
- Re-insurers, short and long-term
- Lloyd's correspondents
- Other credit agents
- Nominee companies
- Retirement funds
- Friendly Societies
- Funerals

It was given responsibility for ensuring that the regulated entities complied with the relevant legislation as well as capital adequacy requirements to promote the financial soundness of these entities, whereby the investing community would be protected.

It was given enforcement powers to deal with breaches through the enforcement committee. The committee could impose unlimited penalties, compensation orders, and cost orders. Such orders were enforceable on the same basis as a judgment of the Supreme Court of South Africa.

It also ran a customer complaints service and a separate appeals board could be approached by anybody aggrieved by a decision of the FSB or its executive officers. The appeals board was an independent tribunal, whose members were neither employees of the FSB nor active participants in the financial services industry. Its chairman and the members were appointed by the Minister of Finance.

== International ==
FSB was a member of International Organization of Securities Commissions (IOSCO) and is a signatory of the IOSCO multilateral MoUs.

The FSB participated in the activities of African regulatory bodies, particularly those in the Southern African Development Community (SADC) region. It had long-standing close relations with Committee Of Insurance, Securities And Non-Banking Financial Authorities (CISNA), part of the SADC directorate.

== Structure ==
The FSB's board oversaw its operations through various committees. The board also appointed the FSB executive officer who presided over the day-to-day running of the FSB. Besides those committees, the FSB also provided funding for the ‘Office of the FAIS Ombud’ and the ‘Office of the PFA’ on the basis of approved budgets. The Offices were part of the same regulatory framework within which the FSB operated, but functioned independently of the FSB, as their sole mandate was to dispose of complaints lodged by consumers of financial services in terms of their respective Acts.

The Executive Officer was also the Registrar of Non-banking Financial Institutions. There were four Deputy Executive Officers responsible for supervision of the various industries, namely Financial Advisory and Intermediary Services, Retirement Funds and Friendly Societies, and Insurance and Investment Institutions.

== Failures and mismanagement ==
The FSB was unable to prevent a number of significant scandals and disasters in South Africa's pension funds industry. It was also accused of favouritism and overcharging for legal and administrative services. Some of its interactions with financial service providers have been described as harsh and bizarre, which led to criticism from the press as well as the financial services industry. In a report released in March 2019, the Public Protector, Busisiwe Mkhwebane, castigated the FSB's officials for a variety of failures spanning more than a decade. The FSCA, a successor to the FSB, countered however that the report was "riddled with inaccuracies".

== See also ==
- Economy of South Africa
- South African Reserve Bank
- Securities Commission
