= Bank Zero =

South African digital bank

- Type: Private
- Industry: Banking; Financial services
- Founded: 2021; 5 years ago
- Founder: Michael Jordaan; Yatin Narsai
- Headquarters: Sandton, Gauteng, South Africa
- Area served: South Africa
- Key people: Michael Jordaan (Chairman); Yatin Narsai (CEO)
- Products: Financial services
- Website: bankzero.co.za

Bank Zero is a South African digital mutual bank. Headquartered in Sandton, Gauteng, the bank provides commercial and corporate financial services. Bank Zero registered with the South African Reserve Bank in 2018, and launched in 2021.

As of September 2026, the bank has 275,000 customers, plus an additional 500,000 end customers via its alliance banking model.

== History ==
Bank Zero was co-founded in 2018, by Michael Jordaan and Yatin Narsai. By the end of 2018, after integration with the South African Reserve Bank, Bank Zero was a full settlement bank.

In early 2019, Bank Zero integrated into the rest of the South African national payments system to become a full clearing bank with an independent licence.

In November 2019, Bank Zero announced a patented debit card, obtained with an agreement with MasterCard, and combined with Bank Zero's in-house, patented security procedures. Instead of storing the card number that is embossed on the card on both the magnetic stripe, and in the card chip, the debit card would have three different card numbers for each: the embossed number, the magnetic strip, and the card chip.

Doing so would allow Bank Zero to limit specific types of transactions to each card number. For example, the magnetic strip card number could only be used at an ATM and at a point-of-sale terminal; the card chip card number could only be used at point-of-sale devices; and, the embossed number could only be used for online transactions. The bank said the new card would dramatically minimize the negative impact of card data theft and card skimming.

While Bank Zero had originally planned to soft launch some of its products at the end of 2019, the company decided to delay its launch to 2020. After disruptions due to the COVID-19 pandemic, the bank's launch was further delayed, until 2021.

In June 2025, Lesaka Technologies (formerly Net1 UEPS Technologies) announced that it had signed a deal to acquire Bank Zero for R1.091 billion, pending regulatory approvals. This received approval from the South African Competition Commission in late 2025.

In June 2026, it was reported that the acquisition had been delayed, pending remaining regulatory approvals. The deal's deadline was extended to 31 January 2027.

In September 2026, after approximately five years of operations, Bank Zero announced that it had posted its first profit the month before, beating its own break-even projection of December 2026. This followed the bank's deposit base more than doubling in the preceding year. At the time of the announcement, Bank Zero had 275,000 of its own customers, plus an additional 500,000 end customers via its partnership with South African fintech Mukuru. Bank Zero also stated that business banking accounted for 18% of its total number of accounts held by clients.

In October 2026, Lesaka Technologies' acquisition of Bank Zero was still going ahead. The deal had received unconditional approval by South Africa's Competition Commission and was awaiting approval from the Prudential Authority, as well as exchange control approval from the Reserve Bank. Lesaka said it expected the transaction to complete in December 2026. At the time, Lesaka had 2 million retail customers and 125,000 business customers.

== Operations ==
The bank is 45% black-owned and 20% female-owned. Instead of outsourcing traditional pre-ready banking packages, Bank Zero relies on a core banking platform.

Bank Zero uses IBM Z mainframe computers and LinuxONE, as a secure platform that can protect against data breaches with IBM's Secure Service Container.

== See also ==
- Banking in South Africa
