= Eubank =

Eubank is a toponymic surname of Old English origin in use since the 13th century, derived from the phrase yew-bank, referring to those who lived near a ridge of yew. Historical spellings include Ewbanke, Ewbanck, Ewbancke, Ewbanche, Ubank, Yuebanc, and Ewbank.

== People with the surname ==
- Carlyle Eubank (born 1987), American writer and screenwriter
- Chris Eubank (born 1966), British boxer
- Chris Eubank Jr (born 1989), British boxer
- Damon R. Eubank (1959–2023), Kentucky historian
- Danielle Eubank (born 1968), American painter and expedition artist
- Harold P. Eubank (1924–2006), American physicist
- James R. Eubank (1914–1952), American lawyer and politician
- John Eubank (1872–1958), American baseball player
- Mark Eubank (born 1940), American television meteorologist
- Shari Eubank (born 1947), American actress
- Sharon Eubank (born 1963), American director of Latter-day Saint Charities
- William Eubank (born 1982), American film director, screenwriter andcinematographer

== Fictional characters ==
- Balph Eubank, character in 1957 novel Atlas Shrugged

== See also ==
- Eubanks (disambiguation)
- Ewbank (disambiguation)
