= Capitec Bank =

Bank in South Africa

Capitec Limited

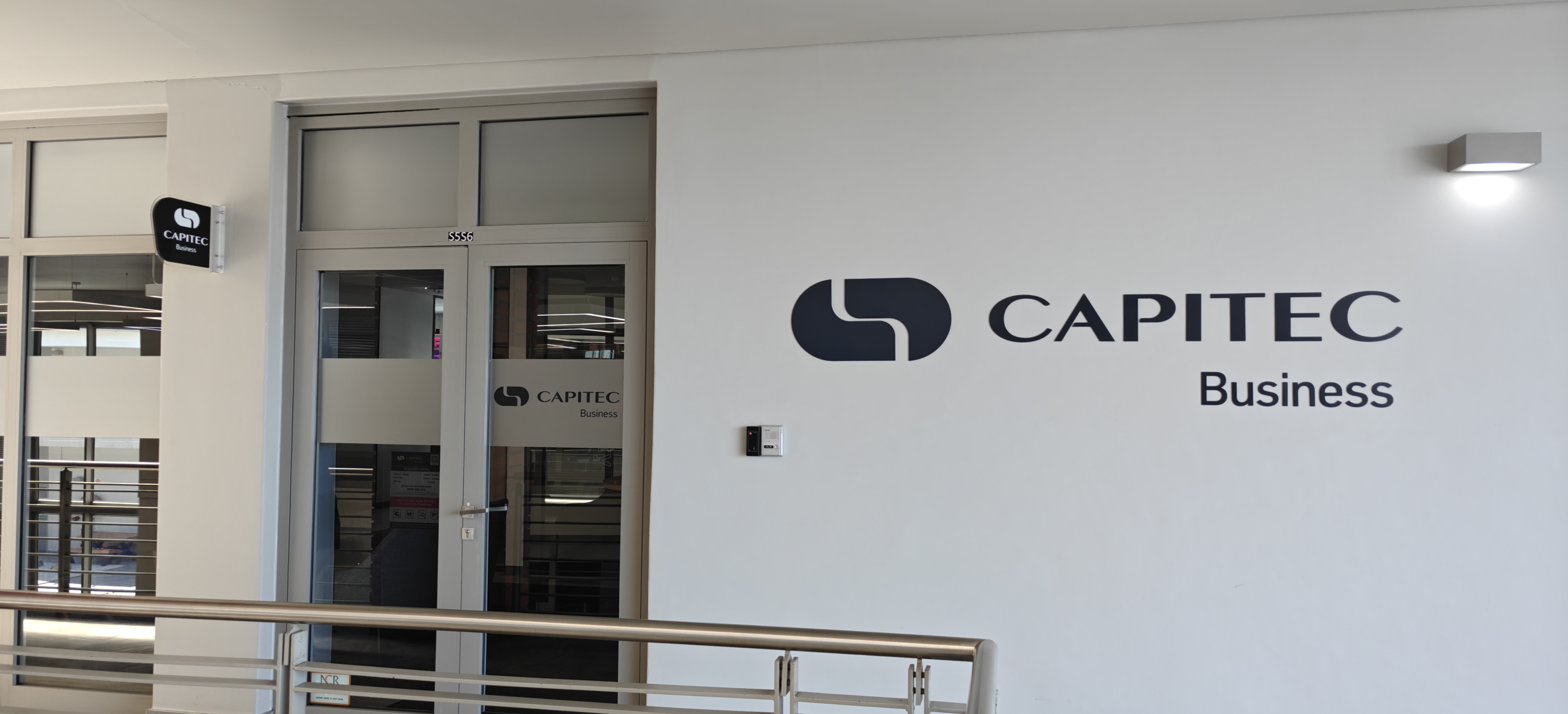
- Capitec Business Banking Center in a shopping center, in Somerset West, Cape Town
- Trade name: Capitec Limited
- Type: Public
- Traded as: JSE: CPI
- ISIN: ZAE000035861
- Industry: Banking; Financial services
- Founded: 1 March 2001; 25 years ago
- Founders: Jannie Mouton; Michiel Le Roux; Riaan Stassen
- Headquarters: Stellenbosch, South Africa
- Area served: South Africa
- Key people: Graham Lee (CEO)
- Products: Investment banking Savings; Credit cards Loans; Mobile telecoms
- Services: Financing
- Revenue: ▲ R35.80 billion (2025)
- Operating income: ▲ R17.73 billion (2025)
- Net income: ▲ R13.74 billion (2025)
- Total assets: ▲ R238.46 billion (2025)
- Total equity: ▲ R50.91 billion (2025)
- Number of employees: 16,935 (2025)
- Website: capitecbank.co.za

Capitec (officially Capitec Limited) is the largest South African commercial bank by customer base. It is licensed by the Reserve Bank of South Africa, the central bank and national banking regulator.

As of September 2025, Capitec was the largest retail bank in South Africa, based on number of customers, serving a total of 24.1 million individuals (constituting 38% of the South African population at the time).

That same month, Capitec also had South Africa's largest branch network, at 880, largest ATM network, at almost 9,000, and highest return on equity out of the "big five" banks. As of mid-2026, Capitec has the largest market capitalization out of all South African commercial banks, at a total value of R566 billion.

== History ==
Capitec was formed in 1997 through the acquisition of micro-lending businesses such as Smartfin and Finaid by the founding entity, PSG, an independent financial services group. It then registered as a bank in 2001.

The bank only managed to attract a notable amount of deposits in 2006. The infant years – 2001 to mid-2006 – were plagued with challenges that stagnated growth.

In 2014, Capitec bought a 40% shareholding in loan provider AvaFin, which serves Mexico, Poland, Spain, Czechia, and Latvia.

According to the annual results for the 2015 financial year, the Capitec's asset base was in excess of R53.9 billion, with R11.6 billion in equity, and with retail savings deposits increasing by 32 percent for the year to R19.3 billion and retail fixed savings increasing by 19 percent to R10.7 billion for the year.

In 2024, Capitec increased its shareholding in loan provider AvaFin to 97%, at a cost of approximately R540 million.

In March 2025, Capitec announced that founding member and CEO Gerrie Fourie would retire in July of the same year, and would be replaced by Graham Lee. At the time, South African online publication news24 credited Fourie for having overseen the rapid rise of Capitec, which transformed from a challenger bank serving 5 million people when he was appointed in 2014, to over 24 million at the time of his departure from his role.

In July 2026, it was reported that Capitec shares had increased 191% over the preceding five years. At the same time, the bank had grown to have the largest market capitalization out of all commercial banks in SA, despite being significantly younger than the rest of the country's "big five".

In August 2026, following its AGM, the bank announced that it would be changing its registered name from Capitec Bank Holdings Limited to simply Capitec Limited. trading in the existing shares under the old name would cease on 26 August 2026, and the official record date for the new name would be 28 August 2026. The bank's new name came into effect on 2 October 2026.

== Operations ==
Capitec offers a range of finance products, including transactional, savings, and investment accounts. Its Capitec App has the most users for a financial services app in South Africa, at 14 million in total, as of October 2025.

Serving as an MVNO, the bank also provides mobile connectivity packages, branded as Capitec Connect, through a partnership with major South African telecoms company Cell C.

== Corporate social responsibility ==
Capitec funds numerous CSR initiatives. The bank has a particular focus on education, and in 2025, it spent a total of around R60 million on programs in the sector (mostly via its Capitec Foundation).

The bank's MoneyUp Academy, seeks to improve general financial literacy in South Africa by providing educational tips to users. As of 2024, it has over 751,000 members. A similar platform exists via its fully automated MoneyUp Chat feature, which operates via WhatsApp, and, as of 2024, has over 144,000 members.

== Accolades ==
In 2025, Capitec had the highest customer satisfaction rating in the South African Customer Satisfaction Index (SAcsi), at 82.2.

== See also ==
- List of banks in South Africa
- Johannesburg Stock Exchange
- Economy of South Africa
