= GoTyme Bank (South Africa) =

South African digital bank

- Formerly: TymeBank
- Type: Private
- Industry: Banking; Financial services
- Founded: 2015; 11 years ago
- Founder: Tjaart van der Walt; Coen Jonker
- Headquarters: Johannesburg, Gauteng, South Africa
- Area served: South Africa
- Key people: Patrice Motsepe, Coen Jonker, Tauriq Keraan (CEO), Thabani Jali (Chairman), Thabo Kelvin Ndimande (Influencer), Dieter Botha (CTO)
- Products: Banking services
- Net income: ▲ R −330.11 million (2024)
- Total assets: ▲ R 8.82 billion (2024)
- Total equity: ▲ R 1.79 billion (2024)
- Parent: Tyme Group
- Website: gotyme.co.za

TymeBank logo, used before the company's 2026 rebranding

GoTyme Bank (formerly TymeBank, and incorporated as TymeBank Limited) is a South African digital-only bank aimed at the lower income market.

Headquartered in Johannesburg, Gauteng, the company was founded in 2015. GoTyme is a division of financial services corporation Tyme Group, which operates banks under the GoTyme name in various markets, including Singapore, Indonesia, Vietnam, and the Philippines.

Unlike major commercial banks in SA, GoTyme does not have any physical bank branches and relies on an Android banking App, and Internet Banking site and a partnership with two retail chains, Pick n Pay and Boxer, to host a national network of self-service kiosks that facilitate the account opening process.

The Prudential Authority of the South African Reserve Bank (SARB), granted permission for GoTyme (then TymeBank) to operate exclusively online on 28 September 2017.

The bank rebranded from TymeBank to GoTyme Bank in January 2026, aligning itself with branding already used in foreign markets, such as the Philippines. A new app was released at the time of rebranding, and existing TymeBank clients could continue using their old physical cards.

== History ==
The "Tyme" (Take Your Money Everywhere) concept was originally developed as part of a Deloitte Consulting project, funded by the telecommunications provider, MTN Group. It went on to become a stand-alone business in June 2012.

In 2015, the Commonwealth Bank of Australia (CBA) acquired 100% of Tyme, and renamed the business TymeDigital by Commonwealth Bank SA. On 28 September 2017, TymeDigital secured an operating licence from the South African Reserve Bank (SARB). It was the first full banking licence to be issued by the SARB since 1999.

In 2018, financial services company, ARC Imali-Madi (RF), bought a 10% stake in TymeDigital. On 5 November 2018, African Rainbow Capital Financial Services Holdings - owned by South African entrepreneur Patrice Motsepe - obtained approval from the South African Reserve Bank to acquire CBSA’s 90% majority stake in the business. The name of the business was changed in November 2018 from TymeDigital by CommonwealthBank SA to Tyme Bank Limited.

TymeBank, as it was then branded, soft-launched on 5 November 2018, allowing consumers to open a basic transactional bank account at a limited number of kiosks in Pick n Pay Stores as well as online.

In October 2025, it was reported that TymeBank had grown to over 10 million customers, and was valued at R26 billion. The bank stated that it would be rebranding to GoTyme Bank during the first half of 2026.

On 22 January 2026, TymeBank rebranded to GoTyme Bank, aligning its naming with foreign operations, such as those in its Asian markets, where the company had seen rapid growth in recent years. The registered company name remained as TymeBank Limited. At the time of rebranding, a new app was released, but customers migrated from one app to the other in phases. All customer data had already been migrated to the new app at the time it was launched, and existing bank accounts remained in operation throughout. Customers could also continue to use their existing physical cards once they transitioned to GoTyme Bank.

In September 2026, major South African financial services group Sanlam announced that it would begin offering banking services in South Africa, in partnership with GoTyme Bank, starting on 1 November that same year. Sanlam said it had received regulatory approval to introduce transactional services to its offerings. Sanlam will facilitate the marketing and distribution of GoTyme Bank's transactional banking products to Sanlam customers, via the latter's ecosystem. The service will begin using a soft launch, and then roll out across SA in 2027.

== Banking in the cloud ==
TymeBank was the first bank in South Africa to put its core-banking platform in the cloud. 85% of TymeBank's systems are AWS cloud applications that provide system scalability, uniform security and cost efficiencies. TymeBank's use of technology and the strategic relationship with Pick n Pay and Boxer stores eliminates the need for physical branches. The reduced operating costs and the national presence of the retail stores removes the barriers that have traditionally prevented an estimated 11 million unbanked South Africans from accessing banking services.

== Ownership ==
Previously wholly owned by African Rainbow Capital Financial Services Holdings, on 10 June 2019 African Rainbow Capital (ARC) and Ethos Private Equity jointly announced an investment of R200 million by the Ethos Artificial Intelligence (AI) Fund and co-investors (jointly Ethos AI Fund) into Tyme Bank Holdings. The transaction is subject to all conditions precedent being met.

The investment by the Ethos AI Fund in TymeBank will result in the fund being an 8% shareholder in the bank.

ARC announced in December 2021 that Tencent and CDC Group had become shareholders in TymeBank. This capital raising was expected to support TymeBank's emerging markets expansion.

== Business model and milestones ==
GoTyme offers a transactional account, money transfer service, savings account and educational App. There are plans to introduce credit cards, unsecured loans, and loans to small and medium-sized enterprises (SME).

On 7 August 2019, TymeBank appointed Tauriq Keraan as the new CEO and by 28 November 2019, the bank had signed up one million customers. By the end of October 2021, TymeBank had four million customers, and it announced partnerships with TFG and Zion Christian Church.

== See also ==
- Banking in South Africa
