= Nedbank =

South African financial services group

Nedbank Group Limited

- Nedbank's regional office in Cape Town
- Trade name: Nedbank
- Type: Public
- Traded as: JSE: NED
- Industry: Financial services
- Founded: 1 March 1888; 138 years ago
- Headquarters: Sandton, South Africa
- Area served: Africa; Europe; UAE
- Key people: Jason Quinn (CEO); Daniel Mminele (Chairman)
- Services: Banking; Asset management Insurance
- Revenue: ▲ R75.9 billion (2018)
- Operating income: ▲ R51.1 billion (2018)
- Net income: ▲ R28.8 billion (2018)
- Total assets: ▲ R1.04 trillion (2018)
- Total equity: ▲ R91.3 billion (2018)
- Number of employees: 31,277 (2018)
- Subsidiaries: Nedbank Limited iKhokha
- Capital ratio: ▼11,7% (2018)
- Website: nedbank.co.za

Nedbank Group is a South African financial services group offering wholesale and retail banking services as well as insurance, asset management, and wealth management. Nedbank Limited is a wholly-owned subsidiary of Nedbank Group.

Headquartered in Sandton, Gauteng, Nedbank's primary market is South Africa. Nedbank also operates in five other countries in the Southern African Development Community (SADC), through subsidiaries and banks in Eswatini, Lesotho, Mozambique, Namibia and Zimbabwe, as well as in offices in Ghana and Kenya. Outside Africa, Nedbank provides international financial services in the Isle of Man, Jersey, Guernsey, the United Kingdom, and the United Arab Emirates.

== History ==
The bank was founded in 1888, in Amsterdam as the Nederlandsche Bank en Credietvereeniging voor Zuid-Afrika ("Dutch Bank and Credit Union for South Africa"). In August that year, the bank opened an agency in Church Street, Pretoria, South Africa with its mission being to provide credit and banking in and with South Africa.

In 1903, the company was renamed to Nederlandsche Bank voor Zuid-Afrika ("Dutch Bank for South Africa"). In 1906, the bank expanded and an office in London was opened. In 1925, NBvZA merged with the Transvaalsche Handelsbank.

In May 1940, Germany invaded and occupied the Netherlands, and this impacted the management of the South African agency from latter country. The South African head office and its branch in London had sufficient assets in sterling, dollars and gold to cover its liabilities. As it was an agency and with its Dutch head office no longer in control, the South African government appoint a controller to run the bank until 1945. Its share of the South African banking market in 1945 stood between 2 and 3 percent.

The banks split on 15 January 1951, renaming its South African counterpart as Nederlandse Bank in Suid-Afrika/Netherlands Bank of South Africa (NBSA) with the Dutch bank (NBvZA) holding a 75% share in the new company. On 1 October 1954, the Nederlandsche Bank en Credietvereeniging voor Zuid-Afrika (NBvZA) merged with Amsterdamsche Goederen Bank becoming Nederlandse Overzee Bank (NOB). In a NBSA shares issue in 1957, NOB maintained its shareholding at 75% but in December 1961, a new share issue by NBSA was not taken up by NOB and so the latter's shareholding dropped to 49 percent. On 1 July 1964, NOB sold some of its shareholding in NBSA to the South African public which saw its holding of the latter drop to 25 percent. NOB merged with Bankierscompagnie NV in 1968 and by the 1971 was called Bank Mees and Hope. After a further share issue in 1968, the Mees en Hope's share in NBSA dropped to 20 percent.

In July 1969, a decision to sell the remaining 20 percent was agreed too and the company became 100% South African-owned after the Mees en Hope Groep NV received payment for its remaining shares between August 1969 and 1 June 1970. The South African counterpart was completely independent. The Dutch counterpart of the bank no longer exists. Syfrets SA and Boland Bank listed on the Johannesburg Stock Exchange in 1969. In 1971, NBSA changed its name to Nedbank.

Nedbank Group formed from the merger of Syfrets SA, Union Acceptances and Nedbank in 1973. In 1986, Old Mutual became the major shareholder (53%) of Nedbank.

In 1992, Syfrets, UAL Merchant Bank, and Nedbank Investment Bank Division merged to become Nedcor Investment Bank (NIB). Old Mutual, Nedcor's holding company, was demutualised and listed on the London Stock Exchange in 1999.

The new Nedcor Group was formed on 1 January 2003, combining Nedcor, BoE, Nedcor Investment Bank, and Cape of Good Hope Bank into one legal entity. The Nedcor Group was renamed the Nedbank Group on 6 May 2005.

In August 2009, Nedbank acquired the 49.9% of Imperial Bank South Africa that it did not own, so Imperial Bank South Africa is wholly owned by Nedbank.

In October 2014, Nedbank acquired a 20% stake in Ecobank, converting its $285 million claim in Ecobank into equity.

In October 2025, Nedbank received approval, without conditions, to acquire uMhlanga-based fintech iKhokha. The acquisition was part of Nedbank's strategy to expand its support for SMEs, and the bank confirmed it would run iKhokha as standalone subsidiary. The acquisition was worth R1.65 billion.

== Nedbank Group ==
Nedbank Group is the holding company of all Nedbank's businesses, subsidiaries, associates and affiliates. The Nedbank Group's major subsidiary and associate companies include the following:

=== Local subsidiaries ===
- Nedbank Limited
- Syfrets Securities Limited
- Nedgroup Investments Proprietary Limited
- Nedgroup Private Wealth Stockbrokers Proprietary Limited
- Nedgroup Collective Investments (RF) Proprietary Limited
- Nedgroup Securities Proprietary Limited
- Nedgroup Private Wealth Proprietary Limited
- Nedbank Group Insurance Holdings Limited
- The Board of Executors
- Dr Holsboer Benefit Fund

=== Foreign subsidiaries and associates ===
- Ecobank Transnational Incorporated
- Nedbank (Zimbabwe)
- Nedbank (Eswatini)
- Nedbank (Lesotho)
- Nedbank Namibia Limited
- Nedbank Limited (Malawi) – Until December 2019
- Nedbank (Mozambique)
- Nedbank Private Wealth Limited (Isle of Man)
- NedEurope Limited (Isle of Man)
- Nedgroup International Holdings Limited
- Nedgroup Investments Africa (Mauritius)

== Ownership ==
Nedbank shares are traded on the JSE under the share code NED and on the Namibian Stock Exchange under the share code NBK. As at 18 January 2019, the shareholding in the group's stock consisting of 497,053,536 issued shares rounded to the nearest digit was:

Nedbank Group
Name of owner	Ownership (%)
Old Mutual Life Assurance Company Limited (SA)	46
Government Employees Pension Fund (SA)	11
Public Investment Corporation (SA)	10
Coronation Fund Managers (SA)	7
GIC Asset Management (Singapore)	5
Allan Gray Investment Management (US)	4
BlackRock (US)	4
The Vanguard Group (US)	3
Lazard Asset Management (US)	2
Nedbank Group share schemes (SA)	2
Sanlam Investment Management (SA)	2
Dimensional Fund Advisors (US)	2

== See also ==
- BoE Stockbrokers
- List of banks in South Africa
- Economy of South Africa
- South African Reserve Bank
