= Banking in South Africa =

Banking in South Africa comprises numerous competitive commercial banks (serving both consumers and businesses), private banks, asset management firms, and co-operative financial institutions. Many of these institutions, especially the commercial and private banks, also operate outside the country's borders.

South Africa has multiple independent governmental bodies working together to regulate the banking sector. The South African Reserve Bank (SARB) serves as SA's central bank, and the country's currency is the South African rand.

Credit profiles, including individual credit scores, are provided in SA by four main bureaus. These are TransUnion (the country's largest), Experian SA, XDS, and VCCB.

In 2025, South Africa had 17 registered commercial banks for its population of 64 million people. A total of 91.1% of banking income was held by the largest five of those banks. In July 2026, around 84% of South African adults had a bank account.

Also in 2025, South Africa had over 3,300 bank branches, over 22,000 ATMs, and around 150,000 employees working in the banking sector. In the same year, the market capitalization of just six of the country's major banking groups was worth over R1.6 trillion.

In recent years, there has been a shift away from cash-based transactions and the use of branches and ATMs in South Africa, towards the use of digital payments and virtual card transactions. This has been reported by multiple commercial banks. Some estimates show that as of January 2026, around a third of online transactions are processed via virtual cards, and around 66% of in-store card transactions are made using tap-to-pay smart devices, such as smartphones and smartwatches.

== Commercial banking ==
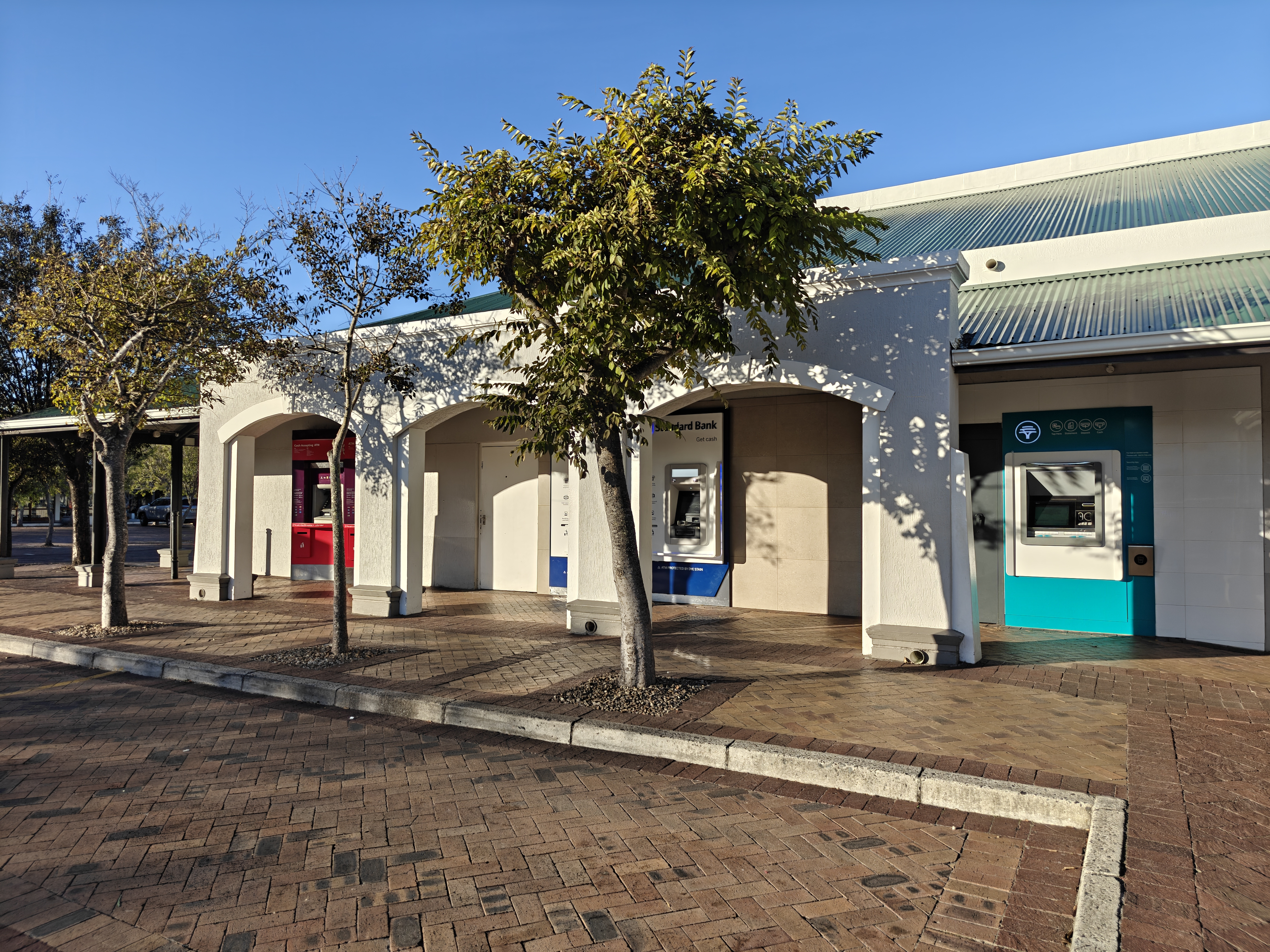
ATMs of ABSA, Standard Bank, and FNB (three of SA's largest commercial banks), in Cape Town

Commercial banking in the country is dominated by the "big five" banks: Standard Bank, FNB, Absa, Nedbank, and Capitec. As of March 2020, they control nearly 90% of the sector's total assets.

Other major, established South African commercial banks include Investec (an exclusively private bank). More recent entrants into the banking market include digital-only GoTyme Bank, Bank Zero, Discovery Bank, and OM Bank.

=== Financials ===
As of 2025, FirstRand, the parent company of FNB, is the country's largest banking group by market capitalization, at almost R500 billion. Meanwhile, Standard Bank has the highest revenue and headline earnings. Capitec has the highest return on equity at 29% - significantly higher than its main competitors.

Also as of 2025, the total market capitalization of the big five banking groups amounts to R1.53 trillion.

The table below is ranked in descending order, according to market capitalization (the total value of a public company's outstanding shares) in South African rand, as at September 2025.

Bank	Market capitalization (R billion)	Annual revenue (R billion)	Headline earnings (R billion)	HEPS (cents)	Tier 1 capital (R billion)	ROE (%)
FirstRand (incl. FNB)	448.9	135.7	41.8	748	192.91	20.2
Capitec	413.3	35.8	13.7	11,912	42.77	29.0
Standard Bank	399	181.7	44.5	2,691	225.8	18.5
ABSA	165.4	109.9	22.1	2,662	146.86	14.8
Nedbank	105.8	73.5	16.9	2,662	101.7	15.8
Totals	1,532.4 (~ 1.53 trillion)	536.6	232.9	–	710.04	–

=== Banking networks ===
Capitec has the largest branch network by far, at almost 900 in total, with the other four major commercial banks operating roughly the same number, at just over 600 each. Capitec also operates the largest ATM network, at almost twice the size of most of the other major commercial banks.

In October 2026, it was reported that the average annual operating cost of an ATM was approximately R307,000, while the estimated annual cost to operate a bank branch was R1.4 million.

That same month, the South African Reserve Bank announced its intention to begin white labeling all of the country's ATMs. It also said that, for transactions below a certain value, it wanted no SASWITCH fees, which are paid when customers interact with ATMs from a different bank to their own, and no interchange fees, which are paid for transactions between banks.

The table below is ranked in descending order, according to total number of branches, as at September 2025.

Bank	Parent company	HQ (bank)	Established	Branches	ATMs
Capitec	Capitec Bank Holdings	Stellenbosch, Western Cape	2001; 25 years ago	880	8,798
FNB	FirstRand	Sandton, Gauteng	1838; 188 years ago	630	4,771
Standard Bank	Standard Bank Group	Johannesburg, Gauteng	1862; 164 years ago	626	3,450
Nedbank	Nedbank Group	Sandton, Gauteng	1888; 138 years ago	623	4,297
ABSA	Absa Group	Johannesburg, Gauteng	1986; 40 years ago	616	5,138
Totals	–	–	–	3,375	22,454

=== People ===
Standard Bank has the largest number of employees within the overall group, however, FNB has the highest by far in South Africa. Capitec has the most customers, by a significant margin, with almost twice as many as second-place Standard Bank. Capitec has 38% of the South African consumers who bank at one of the big five.

Combined, the "big five" banks account for almost 200,000 jobs (~ 150,000 in SA), and over 64 million banking customers.

The table below is ranked in descending order, according to total group employees, as at September 2025.

Bank	Employees (group)	Employees (SA)	Customers (SA, million)
Standard Bank	54,115	29,378	12.4
FNB	50,717	40,194	10
ABSA	36,779	26,542	10
Nedbank	25,613	23,600	7.6
Capitec	16,935	16,935	24.1
Discovery Bank	–	–	1.2
OM Bank	–	–	0.742
Totals	184,159	136,649	66.04

== Private banking ==
Investec, a private bank, also operates in the United Kingdom. Investec maintains minimum annual salary and/or minimum net worth requirements in order to be eligible to open an account. Headquartered in Cape Town, Investec has (as of 2024) over 7,000 employees, and around R730 billion in assets.

Private bank	Parent company	HQ	Established	Annual revenue (R billion)	Adjusted operating profit (R billion)	Total assets (R billion)	Customers (SA)	Ref.
Investec	Investec Limited	Cape Town, Western Cape	1974; 52 years ago	8.14	3.23	251.83	128,000	

Most major commercial banks also offer their own private banking tiers. However, these are not as exclusive as banking with independent private-banking-only institutions, and don't carry the same prestige or the same level of personal customer service. These include:

- FNB Private (FirstRand)
- Standard Bank Private (Standard Bank Group)
- Absa Private Banking (Absa Group)
- Nedbank Private Wealth (Nedbank Group)

== Investment banking ==
South Africa has several major corporate and investment banking operations serving large companies, financial institutions, governments, and other institutional clients. These are generally divisions within larger financial institutions, and they provide services relating to matters including mergers and acquisitions; equity capital markets; debt financing; advisory; capital markets; corporate lending; specialized financing; corporate transactional banking services; and project and infrastructure financing.

Firms providing this kind of investment banking include Investec, RMB, Standard Bank Group, Absa Group, and Nedbank Group.

== Asset management ==
South Africa is home to numerous asset management firms, some of which are independent, while others are subsidiaries of major financial institutions. Most of these are headquartered in either Cape Town or Johannesburg. As of June 2025, total assets under management (AUM) held by major investment firms in SA, attributable to South African clients, totaled over R5.12 trillion. They are as follows:

Asset manager	Parent company	HQ (asset manager)	Year of establishment	Assets under management (R billion)	Ref.
Ninety One	Ninety One Limited	Cape Town, Western Cape	1991; 35 years ago	909.93	
STANLIB	Liberty Holdings	Johannesburg, Gauteng	2002; 24 years ago	804.42	
Coronation	Independent	Cape Town, Western Cape	1993; 33 years ago	668.47	
Sanlam Investment Management	Ninety One Limited	Cape Town, Western Cape	1967; 59 years ago	646.09	
Alexforbes Investments	Alexander Forbes Group Holdings	Johannesburg, Gauteng	1997; 29 years ago	467.76	
Sanlam Multi-Managers	Sanlam	Cape Town, Western Cape	2002; 24 years ago	436.40	
Old Mutual Investment Group	Old Mutual	Cape Town, Western Cape	1993; 33 years ago	427.49	
Nedgroup Investments	Nedbank Group	Cape Town, Western Cape	2003; 23 years ago	427.43	
Momentum	Momentum Group Limited	Centurion, Gauteng	2004; 22 years ago	336.35	
Total	–	–	–	5,124.34 (~ 5.12 trillion)	–

== Credit scoring ==
Four main credit bureaus maintain credit profiles on South Africans. These profiles include credit history, as well as credit scores based on each bureau's particular scoring system. Two of the companies are South African, and two are local operating entities of foreign firms. TransUnion is SA's largest credit bureau. The four bureaus are:

Bureau	Company type	HQ	Local office	Established in SA	Credit scoring system	Free reports & providers	Ref.
TransUnion	Foreign	USA	Sandton, Gauteng	1993; 33 years ago	Excellent: 767–999; Good: 681–766; Favorable: 614–680; Average: 583–613; Below Average: 527–582; Unfavorable: 487–526; Poor: 0–486	Yes, via the Old Mutual Creditview portal	
Experian	Foreign	Ireland	Johannesburg, Gauteng	1996; 30 years ago	Excellent: > 850; Good: 751–850; Fair: 681–750; Poor: 551–680; Very Poor: < 550	Yes, via the Up by Experian portal	
XDS	Domestic	SA	Sandton, Gauteng	1993; 33 years ago	Great: > 657; Good: 634–657; Average: 616–633; Below Average: 599–615; Poor: < 599	Yes, via the Old Mutual Rewards portal	
VCCB	Domestic	SA	Potchefstroom, North West	1996; 30 years ago	Very Low Risk: 901–1000; Low Risk: 876–900; Medium Low Risk: 851–875; Medium Risk: 801–850; Medium High Risk: 751–800; High Risk: 601–750; Very High Risk: 3–600	Yes, via the VCCB website	

== Banking legislation and regulatory authorities ==
Regulations pertaining to banking in South Africa follow a "twin peak" model, being set by two major independent entities; the Financial Sector Conduct Authority (FSCA), and the Prudential Authority (PA). This model was established as part of the 2017 Financial Sector Regulation Act (FSR Act).

On the one side, the FSCA governs market conduct regulations, supervising and setting regulations for the conduct of financial institutions.

On the other side, the PA governs prudential regulations. The PA is focused on the regulation and supervision of financial institutions that provide financial products or services and market infrastructure.

Together, these two authorities carry out their functions in order to protect financial customers and maintain financial stability in South Africa.

All banks in South Africa have to register as such, and comply with the Banks Act.

=== The South African Reserve Bank ===
The South African Reserve Bank (SARB), is the national monetary authority, and serves as South Africa's central bank, having been established in 1921. SARB was the fourth central bank established outside of Europe, having existed since 1921. It is headed by a Governor, a role which is currently held by Lesetja Kganyago, who succeeded Gill Marcus.

SARB has, among others, the following responsibilities within its remit:

- Formulating and implementing monetary policy
- Issuing bank notes and coins
- Controlling gold and foreign-exchange reserves
- Supervising the financial services sector
- Acting (independently) as banker to the South African Government
- Ensuring the effective functioning of the national payment system (NPS)
- Acting as lender of last resort in exceptional circumstances
- Administering the country's remaining exchange controls

=== Other entities ===
Regulatory authorities and government entities working in the banking sector include:

- Financial Intelligence Centre (FIC)
- Financial Action Task Force (FATF)

=== Legislation ===
Legislation that governs banking in South Africa includes:

- Banks Act, 1990.
- Financial Sector Regulation Act, 2017. Prudential Authority within SARB.
- Financial Intelligence Centre Act, 2001 and Financial Intelligence Centre.
- Financial Advisory and Intermediary Services Act, 2002 (FAIS).
- National Credit Act, 2005 (NCA).
- Information Regulator and Protection of Personal Information Act, 2013 (POPI).
- South African Reserve Bank Act 90, of 1989
- Postbank Limited Act 9, of 2010
- National Payment System Act 78, of 1998
- Companies Act 71, of 2008

The FSR Act regulates co-operation between the FSCA and PA, the SARB, the Financial Stability Oversight Committee, the National Credit Regulator, and the FIC.

== Potential new entrants ==
In September 2025, UK-based digital financial institution Revolut announced its intention to apply for a banking license and launch a bank in the SA market. In mid-2026, it was reported that the bank set a goal of launching in SA by 2028.

In July 2026, the largest bank in the UAE, First Abu Dhabi Bank (FAB), confirmed its intention to apply for a South African banking license. This followed a court ruling in favor of FAB, after a decade-long court battle with FirstRand, relating to trademark infringement with FNB.
