= List of asset management firms =

An asset management company is an asset management/investment management company/firm that invests the pooled funds of retail investors in securities in line with the stated investment objectives. For a fee, the company/firm provides more diversification, liquidity, and professional management consulting service than is normally available to individual investors. The diversification of portfolio is done by investing in such securities which are inversely correlated to each other. Money is collected from investors by way of floating various collective investment schemes, e.g. mutual fund schemes. In general, an asset management company is a company that is engaged primarily in the business of investing in, and managing, portfolios of securities. A study by consulting firm Casey Quirk, which is owned by Deloitte, found that asset management firms ended 2020 with record highs in both revenue and assets under management.

== Largest companies ==
The following list given below is a list of the top asset management companies in the world, ranked by total assets under management (AUM) as of 2025:

Firm/company	AUM in 2025	Country
BlackRock	$11.5T	United States
Vanguard Group	$10.1T	United States
Fidelity Investments	$5.5T	United States
State Street Global Advisors	$4.7T	United States
JPMorgan Chase	$4T	United States
Goldman Sachs	$3.1T	United States
Capital Group	$2.8T	United States
UBS	$2.8T	Switzerland
Allianz	$2.5T	Germany
Amundi	$2.3T	France
BNY	$2.0T	United States
Invesco	$1.8T	United States
Franklin Templeton	$1.6T	United States
Northern Trust Corporation	$1.6T	United States
T. Rowe Price	$1.6T	United States
Morgan Stanley	$1.5T	United States
Prudential Financial	$1.5T	United States
Geode Capital Mgmt	$1.5T	United States
Legal & General	$1.4T	UK
BNP Paribas	$1.4T	France

== Asset management companies worldwide ==
=== Africa and Middle East ===
- (Egypt) EFG Hermes
- (Kenya) UAP Old Mutual Holdings
- (Nigeria) First City Monument Bank
- (Nigeria) Heirs Holdings
- (Nigeria) Stanbic IBTC Holdings
- National Social Security Fund (Uganda)
- (South Africa) 10X Investments
- (South Africa) Alexforbes
- (South Africa) Allan Gray
- (South Africa) Camissa
- (South Africa) Coronation Fund Managers
- (South Africa) Foord
- (South Africa) Ninety One
- (South Africa) Old Mutual
- (South Africa) Public Investment Corporation
- (South Africa) Sanlam
- (South Africa) STANLIB
- (South Africa) Taquanta

=== Americas ===
- (United States) Acadian Asset Management
- (United States) AdvisorShares
- (United States) Affiliated Managers Group
- (United States) AllianceBernstein
- (United States) Allspring Global Investments
- (United States) American Century Investments
- (United States) Ameriprise Financial
- (United States) Aristotle Capital Management
- (United States) Arrowstreet Capital
- (United States) AQR Capital
- (United States) Barings LLC
- (United States) BlackRock
- (Brazil) Bradesco
- (United States) Blackstone
- (United States) BNY Investments
- (United States) Boston Partners
- (United States) Bridgewater Associates
- (Canada) Brookfield Asset Management
- (United States) Brown Advisory
- (Brazil) BTG Pactual
- (United States) Calamos Investments
- (United States) Cambridge Associates
- (United States) Cambridge Investment Research
- (United States) Capital Group Companies
- (United States) Charles Schwab Corporation
- (Canada) CI Financial
- (United States) Cohen & Steers
- (United States) Columbia Threadneedle Investments
- (United States) Conning
- (Canada) Connor, Clark & Lunn
- (United States) Dimensional Fund Advisors
- (United States) Dodge & Cox
- (United States) DoubleLine Capital
- (United States) Dreyfus Corporation
- (United States) Eaton Vance
- (United States) Edward Jones Investments
- (United States) Eldridge
- (United States) Federated Hermes
- (United States) Fidelity Investments
- (Bermuda) Fidelity International
- (United States) First Trust
- (United States) Fisher Investments
- (United States) Franklin Templeton Investments
- (United States) GAMCO Investors
- (United States) Geode Capital Management
- (Canada) Gluskin Sheff
- (United States) GMO LLC
- (United States) GQG Partners
- (Canada) Guardian Capital Group
- (United States) Harbert Management Corporation
- (United States) Harris Associates
- (United States) Hartford
- (United States) Income Research + Management
- (United States) Invesco
- (Brazil) Itaú Unibanco
- (United States) J. & W. Seligman & Co.
- (United States) Janus Capital Group
- (United States) Knight Vinke Asset Management
- (United States) Legg Mason
- (United States) Loomis, Sayles & Company
- (United States) Lord Abbett
- (United States) LSV Asset Management
- (Canada) Mackenzie Investments
- (Canada) Manulife Investment Management
- (Canada) Mawer Investment Management
- (United States) Merrill
- (United States) MFS Investment Management
- (United States) Neuberger Berman
- (United States) NISA Investment Advisors
- (United States) Northern Trust
- (United States) Nuveen Investments
- (United States) Oaktree Capital Management
- (Bermuda) Orbis Investment Management
- (United States) Payden & Rygel
- (United States) PGIM
- (United States) PIMCO
- (United States) PineBridge Investments
- (United States) Polen Capital
- (Canada) Power Financial
- (United States) PRIMECAP
- (United States) Principal Financial Group
- (Canada) PSP Investments
- (United States) Putnam Investments
- (United States) Pzena Investment Management
- (United States) Raymond James
- (United States) RhumbLine Advisers
- (United States) RLJ Companies
- (United States) Ruane, Cunniff & Goldfarb
- (United States) Russell Investments
- (United States) SEI Investments Company
- (United States) State Street Global Advisors
- (Canada) Sun Life Financial
- (United States) T. Rowe Price
- (United States) TCW Group
- (United States) Thornburg Investment Management, Inc.
- (United States) TIAA
- (United States) Tsai Capital
- (United States) VanEck
- (United States) The Vanguard Group
- (United States) Victory Capital
- (United States) Virtus Investment Partners
- (United States) Voya Financial
- (United States) Waddell & Reed
- (United States) Wellington Management Company
- (United States) Wilshire Associates
- (United States) WisdomTree Investments
- (Brazil) XP Inc.

=== Asia-Pacific ===
- (Malaysia) Affin Hwang Capital
- (Australia) AMP Capital
- (Singapore) Artradis
- (Japan) Asset Management One
- (Australia) Australian Ethical Investment
- (India) Axis Mutual Fund
- (Australia) BetaShares
- (China) Bosera Asset Management
- (Australia) BT
- (Malaysia) Capital Dynamics
- (Australia) Challenger
- China Asset Management
- China Southern Asset Management
- (Australia) Colonial First State
- (China) E Fund Management
- (Singapore) Eastspring Investments
- (Australia) First Sentier Investors
- (China) Fullgoal Fund Management
- (China) Harvest Fund Management
- (India) HDFC Asset Management Company
- (China) ICBC Credit Suisse Asset Management
- (India) ICICI Prudential Asset Management Company
- (Australia) IFM Investors
- (Australia) Investors Mutual Limited
- (India) JM Financial
- (India) Kotak Mahindra Asset Management Company
- (Australia) Macquarie Asset Management
- (Australia) Magellan Financial Group
- (South Korea) Mirae Asset Financial Group
- (Japan) MUFG
- (China) Noah Holdings
- (Japan) Nomura Holdings
- (India) Nuvama Group
- (China) Penghua Fund Management
- (Australia) Perpetual
- (Australia) Pinnacle Investment Management
- (Australia) Platinum Asset Management
- (Australia) Plenary Group
- (South Korea) Samsung Asset Management
- (India) SBI Mutual Fund
- (South Korea) Shinhan Asset Management
- (Japan) Sumitomo Mitsui Trust Holdings
- (China) Tianhong Asset Management
- (India) UTI Asset Management Company
- (Hong Kong) Value Partners
- (China) Zhong Ou Asset Management

=== Europe ===
- (United Kingdom) Aberdeen Group
- (Netherlands) Aegon N.V.
- (United Kingdom) Alliance Trust
- (Germany) Allianz Global Investors
- (France) Amundi
- (Italy) Anima Holding
- (Netherlands) APG
- (United Kingdom) Ashmore Group
- (United Kingdom) Asset Invest
- (United Kingdom) Aviva Investors
- (France) AXA Investment Managers
- (Italy) Azimut Holding
- (United Kingdom) Baillie Gifford
- (United Kingdom) Barclays
- (United Kingdom) Bluebay Asset Management
- (France) BNP Paribas Asset Management
- (United Kingdom) Brewin Dolphin
- (Luxembourg) Candriam Investors Group
- (France) Capital Fund Management
- (United Kingdom) The Children's Mutual
- (United Kingdom) Cork Gully
- (Germany) DekaBank
- (Germany) DWS Group
- (United Kingdom) Edinburgh Partners
- (United Kingdom) Evelyn Partners
- (Italy) Eurizon Capital
- (United Kingdom) F&C Asset Management
- (Italy) Generali Investments
- (United Kingdom) Generation Investment Management
- (United Kingdom) Henderson Group
- (United Kingdom) Henderson New Star
- (United Kingdom) HSBC
- (United Kingdom) Insight Investment
- (United Kingdom) Intelligent Money
- (United Kingdom) Janus Henderson
- (United Kingdom) Jupiter Fund Management
- (Netherlands) Van Lanschot Kempen
- (France) La Française Group
- (United Kingdom) Legal & General
- (Liechtenstein) LGT Group
- (United Kingdom) Lindsell Train
- (United Kingdom) Liongate Capital Management
- (United Kingdom) M&G Investments
- (Germany) MEAG
- (United Kingdom) Mercury Asset Management
- (Switzerland) Mirabaud Group
- (Switzerland) Swiss Life
- (United Kingdom) Newton Investment Management
- (Netherlands) NN Investment Partners
- (United Kingdom) Octopus Group
- (United Kingdom) Quilter plc
- (United Kingdom) Rathbones
- (United Kingdom) Record Currency Management
- (Switzerland) Lombard Odier
- (Netherlands) Robeco
- (United Kingdom) Royal London Asset Management
- (United Kingdom) Schroders
- (United Kingdom) Scottish Mortgage Investment Trust
- (United Kingdom) Scottish Widows
- (Norway) Skagen Funds
- (Iceland) Stodir
- (Austria) Superfund Group
- (Switzerland) UBS
- (Germany) Union Investment

=== Middle East ===
- (Kuwait) NBK Capital
- (Saudi Arabia) Kingdom Holding Company
- (Bahrain) Investcorp
- (Israel) Clarity Capital
- (Israel) eToro

== See also ==
- List of investment banks
- List of private-equity firms
- List of venture capital firms
- Holding company
- Transnational corporation
