= Lions Gate =

Lions Gate, Lion Gate, Lionsgate or similar terms may refer to:

== Gates ==
- Lion Gate, Mycenae, Greece
- Lion Gate (Mumbai), India
- Lion Gate, one of the entrances to the ancient Hittite city of Hattusa, now in Turkey
- Lion Gate, one of the entrances to the gardens of Hampton Court Palace in London
- Lion Gate, one of the entrances to Kew Gardens in London
- Lions Gate (Porta Leoni), Roman gate in Verona
- Lions' Gate, also called St. Stephen's Gate, Old City of Jerusalem
- Porte des Lions, monumental passageway in the Louvre Palace
- Lions' Gate (Puerta de los Leones), one of the entrances to Chapultepec, Mexico City, Mexico

== Entertainment ==
- Lions Gate Entertainment Corporation, former name of Starz Entertainment, a Canadian-American entertainment company founded 1997
- Lionsgate Studios, a Canadian-American film and television production and distribution conglomerate formed by 2024 Starz Entertainment corporate spin-off
  - Lionsgate Films, the film studio division
  - Lionsgate Television, the television studio division
  - Lionsgate Canada, Canadian subsidiary that acquires and produces film and television series
  - Lionsgate UK, the British film subsidiary

== Places ==
- Lions Gate Bridge, Greater Vancouver, British Columbia, Canada; a bridge
- Lions Gate Hospital, North Vancouver, British Columbia, Canada; a hospital
- North Shore Studios, North Vancouver, British Columbia, Canada; formerly Lions Gate Studios, a TV and film stage studio formerly owned by Lions Gate Entertainment
- Lionsgate Newark Studios, Newark, New Jersey, USA; a TV and film stage studio of Lionsgate Studios
- Lionsgate City, a fictional setting in Kenneth Oppel's 2004 novel Airborn

== Other uses ==
- Lion's Gate Project, professional wrestling developmental branch
- Liongate Capital Management, a defunct investment management firm in the United Kingdom
- Lionsgate Academy, a multi-campus public charter school in Minnesota, United States
- Lions Gate Chorus, a Canadian acapella band
- Lions at the Gate, an American heavy metal band

== See also ==
- All pages with titles containing "Lion" and "Gate"
- All pages with titles containing "Lions" and "Gate"
- Gate (disambiguation)
- Lion (disambiguation)
