= JHG =

JHG may refer to:

- Xishuangbanna Gasa Airport, IATA code
- Janus Henderson Group, NYSE ticker symbol
