= Rhumbline =

Rhumbline may refer to:

- Rhumb line (or loxodrome), an arc crossing all meridians of longitude at the same angle
- A rhumbline network (group of windroses), or straight lines, sometimes emerging from a compass rose, used in portolan charts and in some planispheres
- RhumbLine Advisers, American investment management firm based in Boston
