= Witan Investment Trust =

British investment trust

Witan Investment Trust plc
- Company type: Public
- Traded as: LSE: WTAN
- Industry: Investment management
- Founded: 1909; 117 years ago
- Defunct: October 2024; 20 months ago
- Headquarters: London, United Kingdom
- Key people: Andrew Bell (CEO); Andrew Ross (Chairman)
- Website: www.witan.com

Witan Investment Trust plc was a multi-managed, global equity investment trust. It was listed on the London Stock Exchange until it merged with Alliance Trust in October 2024.

== History ==
Witan Investment Trust plc (Witan) was established in 1909 to manage the estate of Alexander Henderson, 1st Baron Faringdon. First listed on the London Stock Exchange in 1924, it established Henderson Administration (became Henderson Global Investors, now Janus Henderson) to manage its funds in 1932 and then sold its remaining stake in Henderson in 1997. In 2004, Witan became self-managed, appointed its first CEO and adopted a multi-manager approach. Andrew Bell was appointed CEO in 2010. In 2020, Witan became a signatory to the UN-supported Principles for Responsible Investment.

In June 2024, it was announced that Witan Investment Trust would merge with Alliance Trust to create Alliance Witan. This would be achieved through the voluntary winding up of Witan Investment Trust. Following completion of the transaction, Alliance Trust formally rebranded itself Alliance Witan on 11 October 2024.

== Operations ==
The company's portfolio is actively managed between a selection of 8 to 12 third-party delegated investment managers. They manage approximately 90% of Witan’s assets. The remaining assets are invested directly by Witan’s Executive team, which is also responsible for the selection and monitoring of the managers and for the management of the Company’s gearing, under delegated guidelines from the Board.

The CEO of Witan Investment Trust plc is Andrew Bell. The chairman of Witan Investment Trust plc is Andrew Ross.
