= Allan Gray Entrepreneurship Challenge =

- Abbreviation: AGEC
- Formation: 2016; 10 years ago
- Type: Entrepreneurship challenge
- Purpose: Allan Gray support
- Location: South Africa, Botswana, Eswatini, Namibia,
- Parent organization: Allan Gray Orbis Foundation
- Website: theentrepreneurshipchallenge.com

Allan Gray Entrepreneurship Challenge (also known as AGEC) is an annual international entrepreneurship education programme established by the Allan Gray Orbis Foundation. It was launched in 2016 in South Africa and used an online entrepreneurship game in schools and also include three other Southern African countries such as Botswana, Eswatini and Namibia.

== History ==
The Allan Gray Entrepreneurship Challenge (AGEC) was piloted in 2015 by the Allan Gray Orbis Foundation and officially launched in 2016 in South Africa in partnership with Allan Gray Proprietary Limited. It was created to access to entrepreneurship education beyond the foundation's existing programmes.

In 2023, the High School Game was piloted in Botswana, Eswatini and Namibia. From 2024, the game became available in those countries as part of the Challenge's regional expansion. By 2025, the Challenge had developed into a programme incorporating digital games, physical games and business–pitch activities across four Southern African countries.

== Impact ==
The Allan Gray Entrepreneurship Challenge has expanded its participation since its launch and regarded as the leading competition for aspiring entrepreneurs from South Africa. In 2023, thousand participants took part in the revised programme, including approximately 17,500 primary–school learners. The programme reported more than 21,000 learners across the four countries, while its High School Game had been played more than 200,000 times. In 2025, participation increased to more than 40,000 learners across Southern Africa.

The challenge include Business Pitch Challenge, High School Game and Ultimate AGEC Hype Ambassadors. During the finals, the Business Pitch Challenge prize is only awarded to only three participants and top 10 participants on the High School Game Leader board from each countries.

== Honours and awards ==
- 2025 GEE! Learning Game Award – The Allan Gray Entrepreneurship Challenge was named the winner for Gold Award in Informal Learning Game category.
- 2025 International Serious Play Award – The Allan Gray Entrepreneurship Challenge received a Silver Medal.
