= WestPac Wealth Partners =

- Type: Private
- Industry: Financial services
- Founded: 2007
- Founder: Nash Subotic
- Headquarters: San Diego, California, United States
- Services: Wealth management, financial planning, investment advisory, insurance services
- Number of employees: 380+ (2025)
- Website: westpacwealth.com

WestPac Wealth Partners is an American financial services firm headquartered in San Diego, California. Founded in 2007, it provides wealth management, financial planning, investment advisory, and insurance services.

== History ==
WestPac Wealth Partners was founded in Honolulu, Hawaii, in September 2007 by Nash Subotic, Serbian-American entrepreneur who was born in Bosnia and a former basketball player. The firm began with three financial representatives and initially operated under the name Wealth Strategy Partners before adopting the WestPac Wealth Partners name.

WestPac operates as an agency of The Guardian Life Insurance Company of America. Securities products and investment-advisory services are offered through Park Avenue Securities, a registered broker-dealer and investment adviser that is wholly owned by Guardian.

During the 2010s, WestPac expanded beyond Hawaii into the western United States. Fortis Financial merged with WestPac in 2016, and Broad River merged with the firm in February 2017. In 2019, Northern Rockies Financial Group joined WestPac as part of the firm’s expansion into Montana.

The company expanded offices in California, Nevada, Washington, Oregon, Arizona, Montana, and Hawaii. Its corporate headquarters later moved to San Diego, California and having more than 380 employees in 2025.

By 2026, WestPac administered more than $5 billion in assets and served more than 38,000 clients nationwide.

WestPac Wealth Partners ranked first in the small and medium workplace category of Fortune's Best Workplaces in Financial Services & Insurance list in 2024 and 2025. In 2025, it also ranked first on Fortune's 100 Best Medium Workplaces list. The company was ranked first on the magazine's Best Workplaces for Parents list for three consecutive years ending in 2025.

In 2025, WestPac was included in the Inc. 5000 ranking of privately held companies in the United States by revenue growth.
