= Primo Orpilla =

American interior designer

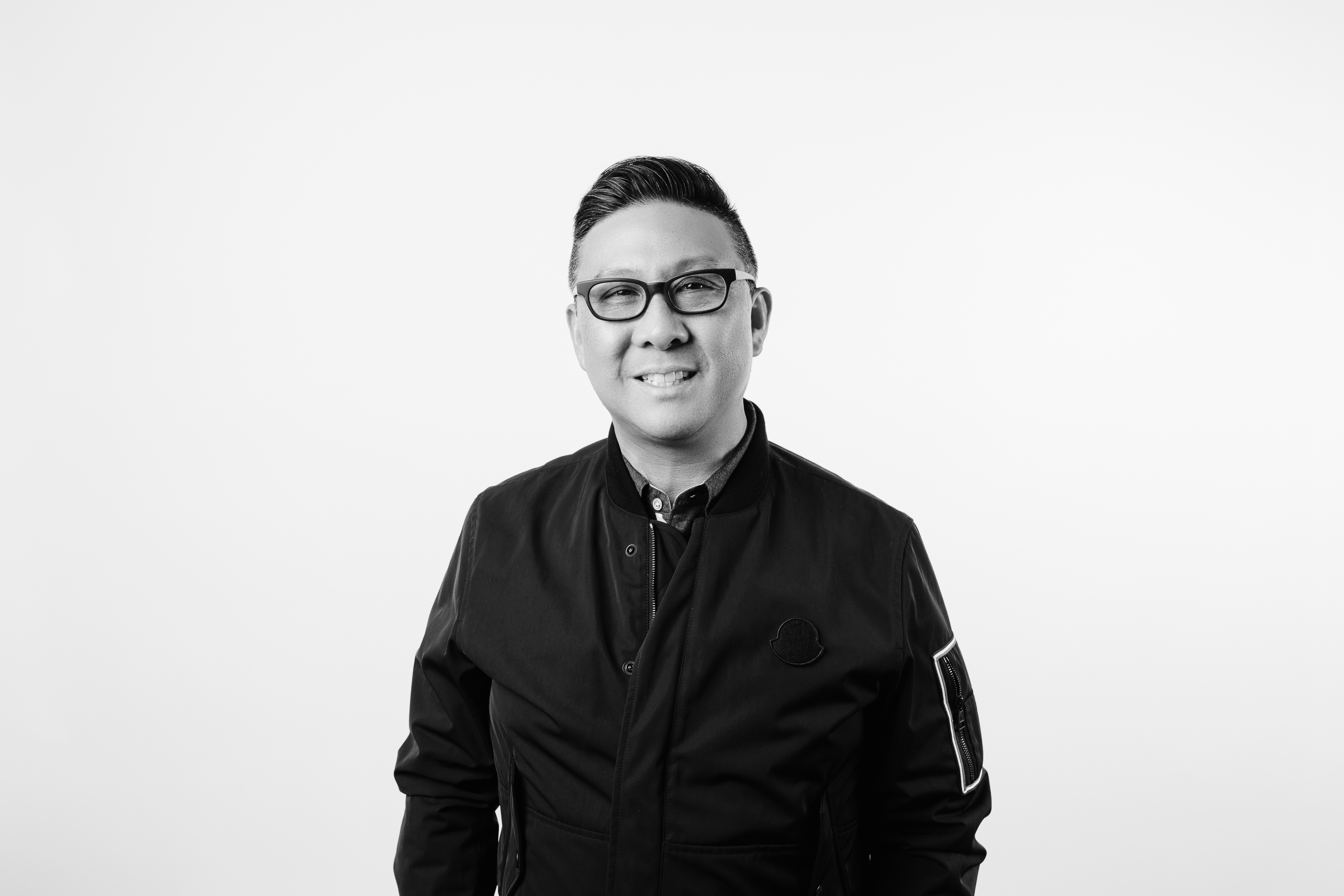
- Education: San Jose State University
- Occupation(s): Co-Founder and Principal at Studio O+A
- Years active: 1991–present

Primo Orpilla is an American interior designer. He has established his business in San Francisco with the aim to providing technological companies with offices that would be a translation of "technology mindset" into design. According to Primo Orpilla the new technology company working space is organised to “share the light and flatten the organization" in the attempt to encourage collaboration within the company.

== Career ==
Primo Orpilla is the interior designer of the offices of large technology companies in Silicon Valley including Facebook, Microsoft, AOL, Samsung, Uber, Yelp, and Giant Pixel. Other companies including Alibaba Group, TATA, Levi Strauss, Evernote and Cambridge Associates have also used his services.

In 2015, he extended his activities to finance and contracting firms looking for improvement of their work amenities.
