= Capital Guardian =

Capital Guardian may refer to:

- Capital Guardian, a division of Capital Group Companies
- Capital Guardians, nickname of units of the District of Columbia National Guard, including
  - 113th Wing
  - 201st Airlift Squadron

== See also ==
- Guardian Capital Group, Canadian financial services business
- Guardian (disambiguation)
- Capital (disambiguation)
