= Janus Henderson =

British-American investment firm

Janus Henderson Investors
- Type: Private
- ISIN: JE00BYPZJM29
- Industry: Investment management
- Founded: 1934; 92 years ago
- Headquarters: City of London, England, UK
- Key people: John Cassaday (Chair); Ali Dibadj (CEO)
- Revenue: ▲US$2.47 billion (2024)
- Operating income: ▲US$646 million (2024)
- Net income: ▲US$409 million (2024)
- AUM: ▲US$493 billion (2025)
- Total assets: ▲US$6.96 billion (2024)
- Total equity: ▲US$4.72 billion (2024)
- Owner: Trian Partners
- Number of employees: 2,300 (2024)
- Subsidiaries: Janus Capital Group; Janus Capital Management LLC; Henderson Global Investors Limited
- Website: janushenderson.com

Janus Henderson is a British-American global asset management group headquartered in the City of London, United Kingdom. It offers a range of financial products to individuals, intermediary advisors, and institutional investors globally under the trade name Janus Henderson Investors.

== History ==
The organization was founded in 1934 to manage the assets of the wealthy London financier Alexander Henderson after his death. The group became Henderson Global Investors. Separately, Janus Capital was created by Tom Bailey in 1969 in Denver, Colorado, who sought to establish an independent asset management service in the western US.

Janus Henderson was then formed from the all stock merger of Janus Capital Group and Henderson Group which completed in May 2017. At the time of the merger, the combined group had assets under management of US$331 billion. The new holding company, Janus Henderson Group plc, was incorporated in Jersey and was listed on the New York Stock Exchange.

In November 2019, the company was fined £1.9 million by the Financial Conduct Authority for overcharging investors. In March 2023, the company was fined €1.7 million by the Netherlands Authority for the Financial Markets for failure to provide notification of its shareholding of 3.02% in Renewi on a timely basis.

The company entered into a joint venture with Privacore Capital, to provide alternative assets for private wealth clients, in June 2023.

In May 2024, the company acquired Tabula Investment Management which specialises in European exchange-traded funds, and in August 2024, it acquired the majority stake in Victory Park Capital Advisors, a private credit manager focused on private asset-backed finance.

In September 2024, the firm acquired NBK Capital Partners, based in the Middle East, which became Janus Henderson Emerging Markets Private Investments Ltd.

In April 2025, Janus Henderson announced a partnership with The Guardian Life Insurance Company of America, which included Janus Henderson managing the $45 billion fixed income asset portfolio for Guardian’s general account. Guardian Life also provided $400 million in seed capital for Janus Henderson’s fixed income and credit products.

In September 2025, it was announced that Janus Henderson and its private credit manager, Victory Park Capital, made a strategic partnership with CNO Financial Group, a life and health insurer and financial services provider in the U.S. In the deal CNO acquired a minority interest in Victory Park Capital and Janus Henderson will remain the majority owner.

In October 2025, Trian Partners and General Catalyst made a non-binding offer to acquire Janus Henderson in a deal valuing the company at $7.2 billion. In December 2025, Janus Henderson signed a definitive agreement to be taken over by Trian and General Catalyst for $49 a share in cash—valuing the deal at a slightly higher $7.4 billion. The deal is expected to close in mid-2026. In March 2026, the board of Janus Henderson unanimously rejected a takeover proposal from Victory Capital and reaffirmed its recommendation for the take-private transaction from Trian. Janus Henderson Group plc was officially delisted from the New York Stock Exchange in July 2026 at $52 per share.

== Operations ==
The company manages mutual funds and ETFs, separately managed accounts, Collective Investment Trusts, and model portfolios in four asset classes: Equities, Fixed Income, Multi-Asset and Alternatives. Offerings include collateralized loan obligations (CLO) strategies, private credit and asset-backed finance capabilities, and tokenized investment products. Janus Henderson is one of the largest providers of active fixed income ETF's, including over $30 billion invested in a fixed income CLO ETF in 2026.

In 2024, the company reported having approximately 2,300 employees in 25 offices.
