= Hugo Wesendonck =

German lawyer

Hugo Wesendonck (24 April 1817 - 19 December 1900) was a German entrepreneur, lawyer and politician.

== Life ==
Wesendonck was the third son of five children of the businessman August Wesendonck and his wife Sophia. One of his brothers was Otto Wesendonck, whose wife Mathilde Wesendonck was a close friend of Richard Wagner. Hugo Wesendonck studied after his Abitur at Gymnasium in Elberfeld 1834-1837 Law at the University of Bonn, where he was one of the founders of the Corps Saxonia. After completing his military service and completing his studies in Berlin, he began a civil service career as an auscultator (trainee lawyer) at the district court in Elberfeld in 1837. In 1842 Wesendonck became a lawyer in Dusseldorf.

After the outbreak of the March Revolution in 1848, Wesendonck was a co-founder of the Association for Democratic Monarchy in Düsseldorf and took part in the pre-parliament. From 18 May 1848 until the end of the rump parliament on 18 June 1849, Wesendonck was a member of the Frankfurt National Assembly for the Düsseldorf constituency. There he was a member of the left parliamentary groups Deutscher Hof and Donnersberg as well as secretary of the Central March Association. Wesendonck was one of the speakers at the people's assembly on the Pfingstweide in Frankfurt am Main in September 1848. In October he took part in the Berlin Democratic Congress and in the anti-parliament. From March to May 1849 he edited the parliamentary correspondence of the Left in Frankfurt am Main. In the same year he became a member of the Second Chamber of the Prussian Landtag.

After the escalation of the imperial constitution campaign, an investigation was brought against Wesendonck in Düsseldorf in July 1849 for high treason and treason, which he evaded in December by fleeing to the United States via Switzerland and France. In 1850, Wesendonck was sentenced to death in absentia.

In the United States, Wesendonck began with the help of his older brother Otto, who emigrated with his wife to Zurich, a trading business with manufactured goods based in Philadelphia. In 1860, he founded Germania Life Insurance and the Deutsche Sparbank in New York.

== Literature ==
- Heinrich Best, Wilhelm Weege: Biographisches Handbuch der Abgeordneten der Frankfurter Nationalversammlung 1848/49. Droste, Düsseldorf 1998, ISBN 3-7700-0919-3, S. 356–357.
- Egbert Weiß: Corpsstudenten in der Paulskirche, in: Einst und Jetzt, Sonderheft 1990, München 1990, S. 45.
- Hugo Wesendonck: Erinnerungen aus dem Jahre 1848, New York, 1898
