= Orbis Investment Management =

Investment management firm

- Founded: 1989
- Founder: Allan W.B Gray
- Headquarters: Hamilton, Bermuda
- Key people: Adam Karr (President)
- AUM: US$34 billion (June 2023)
- Website: www.orbis.com

Orbis Investment Management is an investment management firm headquartered in Bermuda, with offices in London, Vancouver, Sydney, San Francisco, Hong Kong, Tokyo and Luxembourg. The company has a close relationship with Allan Gray Investment Management in South Africa and Allan Gray Australia. Orbis manages approximately $35 billion on behalf of both institutional and individual investors. Orbis Access, its direct-to-consumer platform, was launched in the UK in January 2015.
