= Allan Gray (investor) =

South African businessperson

Allan W.B. Gray
- Born: Allan William Buchanan Gray; 8 April 1938; East London, South Africa
- Died: 10 November 2019 (aged 81); Bermuda
- Education: Selborne College; Rhodes University; Harvard Business School
- Occupation: Founder of Allan Gray Investment Management
- Years active: 1973–2019
- Spouse: Gill Gray
- Children: 3

Allan William Buchanan Gray (8 April 1938 – 10 November 2019) was a South African billionaire businessman and philanthropist. He founded the eponymous investment management company, the nonprofit Allan Gray Orbis Foundation, and the Allan and Gill Gray Charitable Trust.

Before he donated his stake in the Allan Gray investment management company, his net worth was estimated to have been US$1.8 billion in 2017.

== Early life ==
Gray was born in the South African city of East London in 1938. His family had migrated from Aberdeen, Scotland to the then Cape Colony town of Butterworth in the 1890s.

His grandmother was the first female mayor in South Africa, when she was elected mayor of Butterworth years later and had attended the University of Aberdeen. Gray stated that his grandmother played a large role in his future success by instilling a family focus on education.

After completing high school at Selborne College, he studied accounting at Rhodes University and went on to earn an MBA at Harvard Business School in 1965. Gray was known to be dyslexic.

== Career ==
After Harvard, Gray started working for the asset management firm Fidelity Management and Research in Boston, where he stayed for eight years. He established a reputation for being a successful contrarian investor in the economic crash of 1962.

He returned to South Africa in 1973 to found what would become Allan Gray Limited in Cape Town. The company initially focused on investment counseling, later growing to include institutional clients.

In 1989, Gray established Orbis Investment Management in London, to focus on investing in international markets. Two years later the company relocated its headquarters to Bermuda.

By 2015, Orbis was managing over $30 billion in assets. Similarly, Orbis's sister company, Allan Gray grew to be South Africa's largest privately held investment management firm, managing over $35 billion in client capital, making Gray one of Africa's richest men, with a net worth above $2 billion. The return on investment from Allan Gray and Orbis since its founding is comparable in success to Warren Buffett's firm Berkshire Hathaway.

== Philanthropy ==
Gray established the Allan Gray Foundation in 2007 with a US$130 million endowment to fund bursaries and scholarships for talented South African high school students. This was the largest single recorded donation to a charity in South Africa at the time.

In 1979 Gray founded the Allan and Gill Gray Charitable Trust.

In 2016, Gray donated his entire stake in his company to the Allan and Gill Gray Charitable Trust so that dividends from his share in both the South African company and the Orbis Group can be exclusively used for philanthropic purposes.

== Awards and honours ==
In 2012 Gray was awarded an honorary doctorate from the University of Cape Town.

== Personal life and death ==
He was married to Gill Gray, and they lived in Hamilton, Bermuda. Their son, William Gray, was president of Orbis in 2007.

He died of a heart attack in Bermuda on 10 November 2019.
