= Camissa Asset Management =

South African asset management firm

- Formerly: Kagiso Asset Management
- Type: Private
- Industry: Asset management Financial services
- Incorporated: 1998; 28 years ago
- Founded: 2001; 25 years ago
- Founder: Roland Greaver; Gavin Wood
- Headquarters: Cape Town, South Africa
- Area served: South Africa
- Key people: Roland Greaver (CEO); Gavin Wood (CIO)
- Services: Investment management
- AUM: R97 billion (2026)
- Owner: Management and staff (74%); Sinayo Capital (26%)
- Website: camissa-am.com

Camissa Asset Management is a South African asset management firm based in Cape Town. Established in 2001 as Kagiso Asset Management, Camissa had a total of R97 billion in assets under management (AUM) in 2026.

== History ==
Camissa Asset Management was established in 2001 as Kagiso Asset Management, a joint venture between Kagiso Group, which had a 51% shareholding, and Coronation Fund Managers, with a 49% stake.

In 2005, Coronation sold its share in the business, and management and staff acquired a 30% shareholding. The company subsequently increased employee ownership, with management and staff holding 49.9% by 2011, while Kagiso Tiso Holdings retained the controlling stake.

In 2009, the company launched its first Shariah-compliant investment fund, the Islamic Equity Fund. The following year, it established its own unit trust management company, Kagiso Collective Investments.

In 2018, the company launched an offshore UCITS fund business domiciled in Ireland, expanding its investment offering to international investors.

In February 2022, Kagiso Tiso Holdings sold its 50.1% shareholding in the company, as part of a restructuring. Management and staff increased their joint shareholding to 74%, while Sinayo Capital acquired the remaining 26%. The company changed its name to Camissa Asset Management, marking its transition to an independently controlled, employee-owned business.

In 2024, Camissa managed R58.1 billion in assets on behalf of South African clients, comprising R42.7 billion in institutional mandates and R15.4 billion in retail mandates. At the time, the company had an investment team totaling 21 people.

== Operations ==
Camissa manages investment portfolios for individual and institutional investors. The company also manages investments through an offshore fund structure domiciled in Ireland, which provides access to its investment strategies for international investors.

As of 2026, Camissa held a total of R97 billion in assets under management (AUM).

== See also ==
- Banking in South Africa
