= Zhong Ou Asset Management =

Chinese asset manager

Zhong Ou Asset Management Co., Ltd
- Native name: 中欧基金管理有限公司
- Formerly: Lombarda China Fund Management
- Type: Private
- Industry: Financial services
- Founded: July 19, 2006; 19 years ago
- Headquarters: Shanghai, China
- Key people: Dou Yuming (Chairman); Liu Jianping (CEO)
- AUM: US$70 billion (Q1 2023)
- Owners: Dou Yuming (25%); Warburg Pincus (23.3%); Guodu Securities (20%)
- Subsidiaries: Zhong Ou Asset Management International Limited
- Website: www.zofund.com

Zhong Ou Asset Management (Zhong Ou; Chinese: 中欧基金管理; pinyin: Zhōng'ōu Jījīn Guǎnlǐ) is a Chinese asset management company founded in 2006. It is headquartered in Shanghai, China.

== Background ==
The company was originally founded in July 2006 as Lombarda China Fund Management, a three-way joint venture (JV) between Banca Lombarda e Piemontese (49%), Guodu Securities (47%) and Pingdingshan Coal Group (4%). According to Luca Frontini who was then-CEO of Lombarda China, the decision was made as Banca Lombarda was looking for the next growth opportunity and wanted to have more international presence. The deal took only nine months.

In May 2008, Lombarda China shareholders voted to remove Frontini as CEO. His departure came as a surprise to many as he was among the few recognizable foreigners running a Chinese fund house. An industry source suggested Frontini may have been a victim of a clash between shareholders due to a trend of increasing tensions between foreign and domestic owners of Sino-foreign joint ventures. While tensions were less common during bull markets, due to the 2008 financial crisis, the company at the time had experienced a decline of 20% of its assets under management in the latest quarter. Another source stated that Frontini might have been condemned due to lack of local language skills. Lombarda China's strategy as a boutique fund house in a highly regulated and immature market was seen as inappropriate especially given the limited investment tools available. The shareholders were making moves towards what they thought was appropriate senior management positioning. Wang Hua stepped in as interim CEO.

Later on Lombarda China was rebranded to Zhong Ou Asset Management. In 2014, Zhong Ou claimed to be the first fund house in China that allowed members of the management team to hold an ownership stake.

In July 2017, UBI Banca (formed from Banca Lombarda) transferred 10% of its 35% stake in Zhou Ou to Zhong Ou's management team. As a result, it was no longer the largest shareholder of the fund house as the management team now owned 32%.

In April 2023, Warburg Pincus obtained approval from the China Securities Regulatory Commission (CSRC) to acquire a 23.3% stake of Zhong Ou from Intesa Sanpaolo (who acquired UBI Banca). This came at a time where foreign financial institutions were seeking increase their investments in local fund houses to get more exposure to China mutual fund market.

== Regulatory issues ==
In June 2011, Xu Chunmao, a former vice president at Lombarda China was put in police custody for investigation after he was found to be involved with insider trading. The Shanghai Asset Management Association stated Xu used the tactic of front running during his tenure at Everbright Pramerica Fund Management between 2006 and 2010. Xu joined Lombarda China in May 2010 before the CSRC launched a probe into suspicious trades by him. At the time, Xu was the most senior manager in China's asset management sector to be convicted of insider trading.
