= Ian's Law =

New York state law

Ian's Law, enacted as Chapter 398 of the Laws of 2010, is a New York state law that amended the state's insurance law relating to the discontinuance of health insurance policies. The law requires insurers to provide advance notice and replacement coverage options when ending a class of policies and prohibits insurers from discontinuing coverage for the purpose of removing a high-cost policyholder from a plan. The law was named after Ian Pearl, a Florida resident with spinal muscular atrophy whose dispute with Guardian Life Insurance Company of America received national media coverage in 2009.

== Background ==
Ian Pearl, a resident of Southwest Ranches, Florida, was born with Type II spinal muscular atrophy. At age 19, he suffered respiratory arrest and later required the use of a ventilator and home nursing care.

Pearl received health insurance coverage through a small-business plan purchased by his father from Guardian Life Insurance Company of America. The policy covered home nursing services costing approximately US$1 million annually.

In 2008, Guardian Life informed the Pearl family that it would discontinue the category of insurance policies that included Pearl's plan. Under the federal Employee Retirement Income Security Act of 1974, insurers could not terminate coverage for an individual policyholder while continuing the broader policy category. Guardian instead discontinued the entire class of policies in New York.

The Pearl family filed suit against the insurer. During the case, internal company emails became public. One email referred to eliminating a block of policies "to get rid of the few dogs", referring to high-cost policyholders. Other documents described certain policyholders as "trainwrecks".

In October 2009, a federal judge ruled that Guardian's actions were legal under existing law. The case received coverage from CNN, the Miami Herald, the Washington Times, and KFF Health News. Guardian later restored Pearl's coverage following public attention surrounding the case.

== Legislative history ==
Ian's Law was introduced in the New York State Senate on November 4, 2009, as Senate Bill S6263-C. The bill was sponsored by Senator Eric Schneiderman.

Supporters of the bill said insurers were able to discontinue entire classes of insurance policies in order to remove expensive policyholders from coverage.

The legislation was passed by the New York State Legislature and signed into law by Governor David Paterson in 2010.

== Provisions ==
Ian's Law amended New York insurance law to establish additional requirements for insurers discontinuing a class of group health insurance policies.

Under the law:

- insurers must provide written notice at least 90 days before discontinuing coverage
- insurers must offer affected policyholders the option to purchase replacement coverage offered by the insurer
- insurers may not discontinue a group plan for the purpose of removing a high-cost policyholder from coverage
- and the state Superintendent of Insurance may review discontinuances involving policyholders with serious medical conditions who do not have access to comparable replacement coverage.

At the bill signing, Paterson said the law strengthened consumer protections for individuals whose health insurance coverage was terminated without replacement coverage being offered.

== See also ==
- Employee Retirement Income Security Act of 1974
- Leandra's Law
- Timothy's Law
