= Winthrop Center =

Skyscraper in Boston, Massachusetts, USA

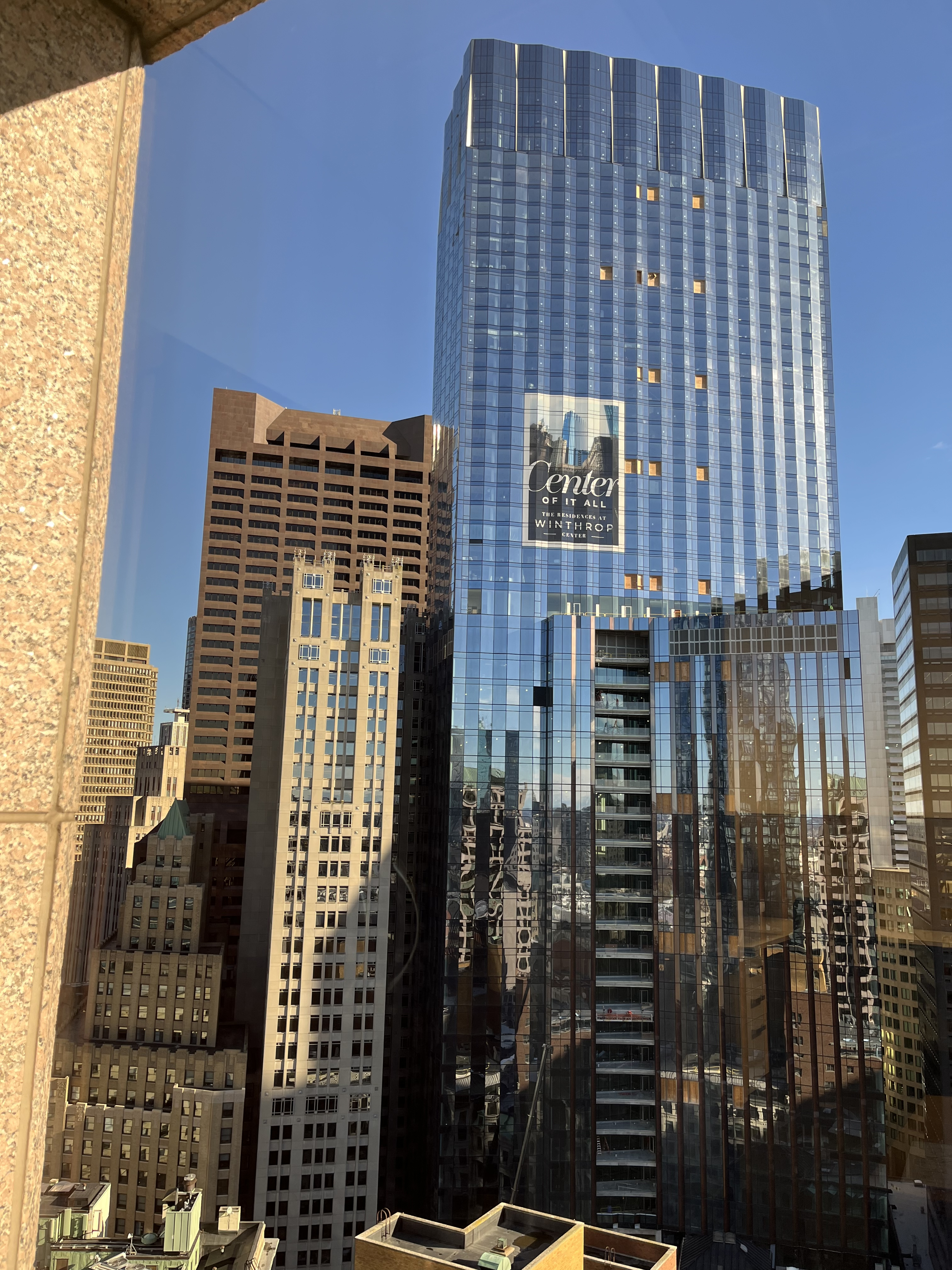
Winthrop Center December 8, 2022

Winthrop Center, is a skyscraper in Boston, Massachusetts, United States. It is currently the fourth-tallest building in Boston, Massachusetts. The tower is built on the site of the defunct Winthrop Square Garage in the Financial District.

== History ==
While planning the Winthrop Square Tower, six developers pitched designs to the Boston Planning & Development Agency, where the design by the Millennium Partners was chosen in August 2016.

On October 26, 2016, the Boston Redevelopment Agency approved the construction of the tower.

In November 2016, Millennium Partners increased the height to 775 feet (236 m). The building's planned height was later shortened to 702 feet (214 m).

In January 2018, the height was lowered again, to 691 feet (211 m), and in May 2018 to 690.7 feet (210.5 m)

On October 18, 2018 Millennium Partners announced a groundbreaking date for October 24, 2018 and changed the name from “Winthrop Square Tower” to “Winthrop Center”. The completion of the tower was planned for March 2023.

== One Winthrop Square Park redevelopment ==
Winthrop Square to receive enhancements in connection with tower construction, and with that, Millennium Partners decided to redevelop the heart of Winthrop Square Park. It would include street trees, a water feature, granite paving, flowering understory trees, canopy trees, sculptural benches and a pedestrian connection to Winthrop Center.

== Controversy ==
Many activists and residents in the city have opposed the building's construction, as the building as originally proposed would create a large shadow on Boston Common for at least 90 minutes on some mornings. This would break a state law that prohibits shadows on Boston Common or the Public Garden. The tower was also scrutinized by Massport, claiming that the tower's height would interfere with air traffic from Logan Airport. Former Boston Mayor Marty Walsh has stated that he wishes to modify the state law prohibiting the building's construction, to allow the construction of the tower but to prevent future developments in the area.

The planned height of the building was altered in September 2017, to comply with the Federal Aviation Administration's declaration that the building's proposed height was too tall and would, therefore, disrupt flights from Logan International Airport. The planned height of the building was lowered from 775 feet (236 m) to 702 feet (214 m). The height was reduced again, in January 2018, to 691 feet (211 m), and a modified design with a height of 690.7 feet (210.5 m) was approved on May 1, 2018.

== Tenants ==
- Cambridge Associates
- Deloitte
- Income Research + Management
- M&T Bank
- McKinsey & Company

== See also ==
- List of tallest buildings in Boston
