= Where Keynes Went Wrong =

Where Keynes Went Wrong: And Why World Governments Keep Creating Inflation, Bubbles, and Busts
- Author: Hunter Lewis
- Language: English
- Subject: Economics
- Publisher: Axios Press
- Publication date: 2009
- Publication place: United States
- Media type: Print
- Pages: 384
- ISBN: 978-1-60419-017-5

Where Keynes Went Wrong: And Why World Governments Keep Creating Inflation, Bubbles, and Busts is a non-fiction work by Hunter Lewis. It was first published in 2009.

== Synopsis ==
This 384 page book for both general reader and economist questions the validity of John Maynard Keynes’s assumptions. Lewis argues that The General Theory of Employment, Interest and Money is based almost exclusively on Keynes’s intuition rather than on demonstrated logic or solid evidence. Lewis begins by demystifying Keynes by giving his elaboration of Keynes's writings in General Theory of Employment, Interest, and Money and other works. Using claims from the Austrian School of economics and citing historical evidence, Lewis then argues that government policies based on Keynes’s prescriptions have actually made things worse, not better. Lewis presents alternatives to Keynesian intervention and urges a change in current global policy to foster economic recovery.

== Critical reception ==
In a January 2011 article published in L'Osservatore Romano, Ettore Gotti Tedeschi, the Vatican bank chief, cited the work in his warnings about economic policies of both United States and European governments thus endorsing Hunter Lewis's moral philosophy arguments regarding sustainability and social justice.

Belgian economist Paul De Grauwe gave the book an unfavorable review, describing it as a "collection of bullet point presentations" that presented "no more than a caricature of Keynes' view" and argued that "Keynes is the great devil because he has legitimized so much of post-war government policies".
