= Asset Invest =

English land investment company

Asset Invest Ltd
- Type: Private company
- Industry: Asset management Land investment
- Founded: 2021
- Headquarters: London, England, United Kingdom
- Key people: Fraser Karlsen (director)
- Products: Land investments
- Website: www.asset-invest.uk

Asset Invest Ltd is an asset management company which specialises in land investments across the United Kingdom, and is registered in London.

== History and operations ==
The company's registered director is Fraser Karlsen. In 2024, in relation to a plot of land in Knutsford, Cheshire, he described the company's operations: "Asset Invest own over 2,300 titles throughout the UK. When our consultants and surveyors get onto the respective title or file we decide the best process either retain or sell." In June 2024, he gave a similar description when asked about the sale of a grassy bank "roughly twice the width of a kingsize bed" in front of residential houses in Crookston Road in the Royal Borough of Greenwich.

=== Controversies ===
In 2023, Asset Invest bought the titles to 87 plots of land from Bilton Land Limited for £1 plus VAT. In August 2025, the company sent letters to home owners in the former Percy Bilton estate in Bexhill, East Sussex requesting retrospective permission for alterations under the terms of restrictive covenants on their homes. The home owners would be charged substantial sums for this permission. The issue was also publicised in April 2026 by Bexhill and Battle MP Kieran Mullan.

Also in April 2026, a Kent parish council intended to try to buy at auction a small parcel of land forming a large roundabout in Abingdon Road on the Beverley estate in Barming, Maidstone. Residents had assumed the plot was owned by Kent County Council (whose contractors cut the grass), but the ultimate owner was Asset Invest. A deal was agreed outside of the auction, preventing potential development of the space.

According to the "What our clients say" section at the bottom of Asset Invest's website via a customer testimonial from a Leslie O, Asset Invest at some point bought the land on which sits only the access road to The Brambles estate in Wardhedges, Flitton, Bedfordshire. Asset Invest then offered the residents the chance to buy the road as a collective, which residents did after seeking legal advice.
