= Hunter Lewis =

American economist

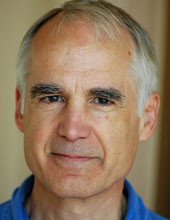
Hunter Lewis

Hunter Lewis (born October 13, 1947) is an American businessman and investor who is the co-founder of Cambridge Associates LLC, a global investment firm, and author of books in the fields of economics and moral philosophy.

== Early life ==
Lewis was born in Dayton, Ohio, US, in 1947 and graduated from Groton School and Harvard University (AB 1969).

== Investment career ==
After working at the Boston Company, then one of the largest investment managers, where he became a vice president in 1972, Lewis in 1973 co-founded and was co-chief executive and then chief executive of Cambridge Associates LLC, an investment advisor to American research universities and colleges representing over three-quarters of U.S. higher education endowment assets, other non-profits, international organizations, and families, with offices in the U.S., Europe, and Asia. Lewis was a co-inventor of what became known as the American University style of institutional investing, which gave American university endowment funds the highest investment returns in the world among institutional investors, and which became widely emulated.

Lewis retired from Cambridge Associates in 2018 and founded Hunter Lewis LLC, another investment advisory firm.

During his investment career, Lewis also was the treasurer of the World Wild Life Fund.

== Publications ==
Hunter Lewis has written a number of books on economics, and has had articles published by Barron's, The Wall Street Journal and others.

Books on economics include:

- Economics in Three Lessons & One Hundred Economic Laws (Axios Press; October 1, 2017)
- Crony Capitalism in America: 2008-2012 (AC² Books; September 1, 2013)
- Where Keynes Went Wrong: And Why World Governments Keep Creating Inflation, Bubbles, and Busts (Axios Press; September 25, 2009)
- Are the Rich Necessary?: Great Economic Arguments and How They Reflect Our Personal Values (Axios Press; September 25, 2007; Rev and expanded PB edition October 30, 2009)
- The Real World War (Coward, McCann & Geoghegan/Putnam; 1982)

Books on moral philosophy include:

- The Secular Saints: And Why Morals Are Not Just Subjective (Axios Press, 2018)
- A Question of Values: Six Ways We Make the Personal Choices That Shape Our Lives (Harper, Collins; 1990, Axios Press; Rev edition May 25, 2000)
- The Beguiling Serpent (Axios Press; August 31, 2000)
- Alternative Values: For and Against Wealth, Power, Fame, Praise, Glory, and Physical Pleasure (Axios Press; July 25, 2005)

Articles include:

- Why Index Funds Could Fade (Barron's; August 12, 2022)
- A Risky Time For Venture Funds (Wall Street Journal; February 2, 2022)
- Sustainability, The Complete Concept: Environment, Healthcare, and Economy
