= United Asset Management =

Former American holding company

- Company type: Private
- Industry: Financial services
- Founded: 1980; 46 years ago
- Founder: Norton Reamer
- Defunct: 2000
- Fate: Acquired by Old Mutual
- Headquarters: Boston, Massachusetts, U.S.

United Asset Management was an American holding company headquartered in Boston, Massachusetts.

== Background ==
The company was founded in 1980 as United Asset Management (UAM) by Norton Reamer, who previously had served as the CEO of Putnam Investments. The company was the first major firm with a business model that consisted of purchasing a number of money management firms.

UAM's strategy was to purchase a variety of investment management firms, and then keep a portion of the firms' profits. They allowed each company to operate autonomously and did not close poorly performing units. More than half of UAM's assets were retirement funds. They used stock and cash to fund its acquisitions. They used First Boston as an investment bank to raise money for takeovers, using equity rather than convertible bonds. Some investors viewed the idea of purchasing stock in UAM as akin to an option on the New York Stock Exchange, where it was listed in 1987.

In 1992, UAM acquired Acadian Asset Management.

In September 2000, UAM was purchased by Old Mutual for US$1.46 billion in cash. Old Mutual also assumed UAM net debt of around US$769 million. The company was then renamed Old Mutual Asset Management (OMAN).

== Post acquisition ==
In June 2016, OMAN acquired 60% of Landmark Partners for $240 million.

On October 15, 2014, OMAN held an initial public offering on the New York Stock Exchange.

In March 2018, the company rebranded itself as Brightsphere Investment Group.

In November 2018, Paulson & Co. acquired a 25% stake of Brightsphere Investment Group from HNA Group which acquired it in 2017.

In June 2020, Brightsphere Investment Group became a member of the S&P 600.

In 2021, the company sold its interest in most of its holding companies. On June 2, Landmark Partners was sold to Ares Management. On July 19, the Investors Counselors of Maryland was sold to William Blair & Company. On July 22, Thompson, Siegel & Walmsley was sold to Pendal Group. On August 31, Campbell Global was sold to JPMorgan Chase.

On January 1, 2025, the company rebranded to Acadian Asset Management Inc.
