= Connor, Clark & Lunn =

Canada asset management firm

Connor, Clark & Lunn Financial Group Ltd.
- Type: Private
- Industry: Investment Management
- Founded: 1982; 44 years ago
- Founders: Larry Lunn; John Clark; Gerry Connor
- Headquarters: Exchange Tower, Toronto, Ontario, Canada
- Key people: Michael Freund (Chairman); Warren Stoddart (President and CEO)
- AUM: CA$132 billion (2024)
- Website: cclfg.cclgroup.com

Connor, Clark & Lunn Financial Group (CC&L) is a Canadian multi asset investment management firm headquartered in Toronto, Ontario. It is one of Canada's largest privately owned investment management firms. Outside Canada, it has offices in the United States, the United Kingdom and India.

== History ==
In 1982, Larry Lunn, John Clark and Gerry Connor founded Connor, Clark & Lunn in Vancouver. At the time there was a perception that most money management wisdom was based in Toronto so Connor, Clark & Lunn made a pitch to pension funds that it would be an alternative choice from the Toronto groupthink. The approach paid off and CC&L won business due to its being perceived as different.

In 1987, Connor, Clark & Lunn made its name by anticipating Black Monday in advance. Over the next five years, its assets climbed from CA$700 million to CA$5 billion.

In October 2001, Connor, Clark & Lunn and Arrowstreet Capital created a joint venture named Connor, Clark & Lunn Arrowstreet Capital. It would invest in global equities for institutional investors.

Towards the end of 2002, Connor, Clark & Lunn was restructured to become Connor, Clark & Lunn Financial Group. It became an umbrella that contained eight investment management affiliates and three distribution businesses.

In 2013, CC&L sold its structured products unit to Aston Hill for CA$20.5 million.
