= John Y. Campbell =

British-American economist (born 1958)

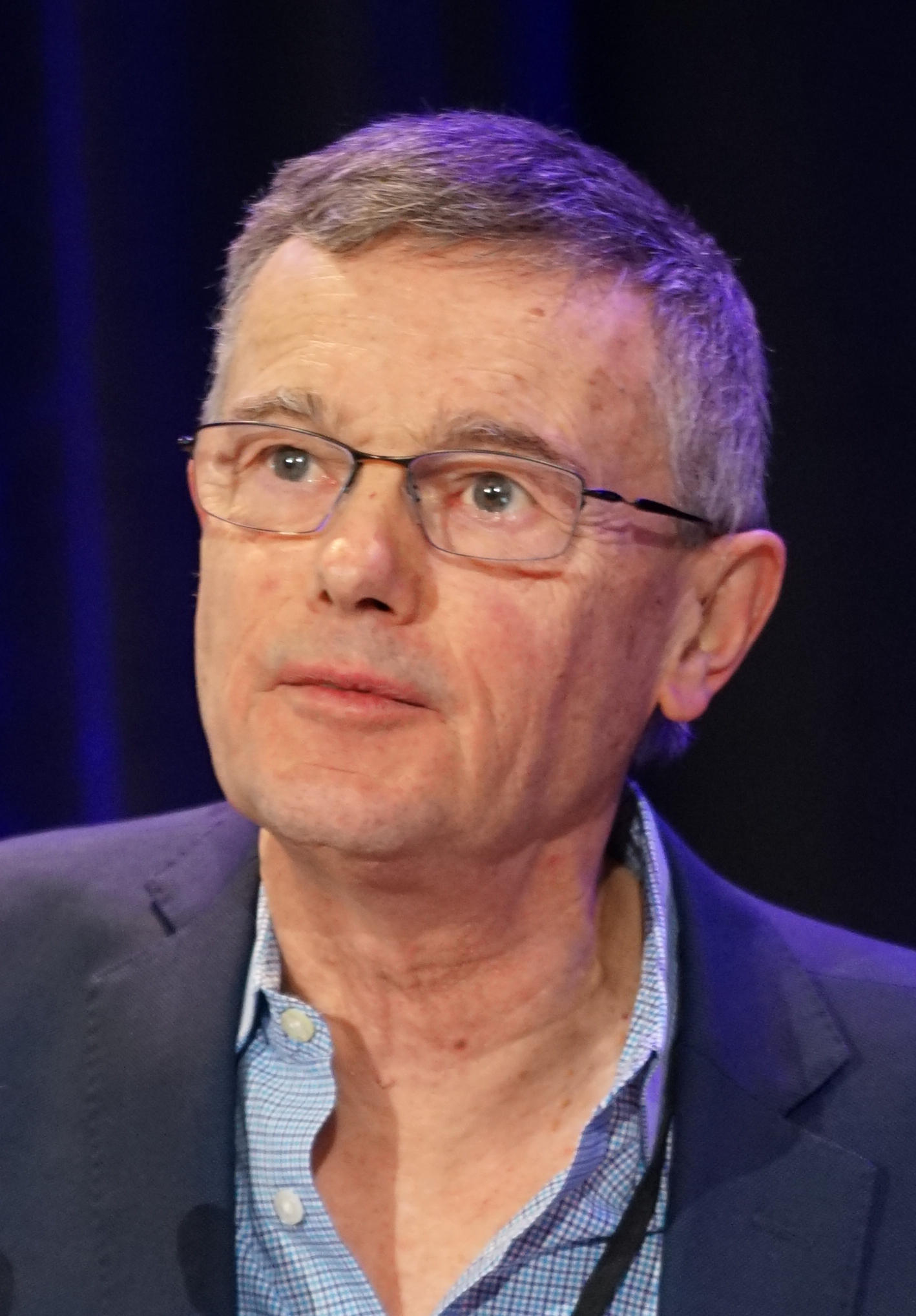
- Campbell at ASSA 2026
- Born: May 17, 1958 (age 68); London, England

Academic background
- Education: Corpus Christi College, Oxford (BA); Yale University (MPhil, PhD)
- Doctoral advisor: Robert Shiller

Academic work
- Discipline: Financial economics
- Institutions: Harvard University
- Website: Information at IDEAS / RePEc

John Young Campbell (born May 17, 1958) is a British-American economist who serves as the Morton L. and Carole S. Olshan Professor of Economics at Harvard University, where he has taught since 1994.

== Biography ==
=== Early years ===
Born in London, Campbell was educated at the Dragon School, Winchester College, and Corpus Christi College, Oxford, where he read PPE and took a first in 1979. From 1979 to 1984, he attended Yale University, receiving an MPhil in 1981, and a PhD in 1984. His thesis adviser at Yale was Robert J. Shiller and his dissertation committee included James Tobin and Stephen A. Ross.

=== Academic career ===
From 1984 to 1994, Campbell taught at Princeton University, where he was an assistant professor from 1984 to 1989, and the Class of 1926 Professor of Economics from 1989 to 1994. In 1994, he became the Otto Eckstein Professor of Applied Economics at Harvard University, where he has remained ever since; he was named the Morton L. and Carole S. Olshan Professor of Economics in 2005, and held a Harvard College Professorship from 2006 to 2011.

Campbell has received various honors, including:

- Research Associate of the National Bureau of Economic Research (NBER), 1987
- Fellow of the Econometric Society, 1990
- Fellow of the American Academy of Arts and Sciences, 2000
- President of the American Finance Association, 2005
- Honorary Fellow, Corpus Christi College, Oxford, 2008
- President, International Atlantic Economic Society, 2008
- Corresponding Fellow, British Academy, 2009
- Honorary doctorates from Maastricht University, 2009; Université Paris Dauphine, 2009; Copenhagen Business School, 2015; BI Norwegian Business School, 2018; London Business School, 2026
- Fellow of the Financial Management Association, 2024
- Member of the National Academy of Sciences, 2026

His invited lectures include:

- Clarendon Lectures, University of Oxford, 1999
- Marshall Lectures, University of Cambridge, 2001
- Joint Luncheon Address to the American Economic Association and the American Finance Association, 2002
- Presidential Address, American Finance Association, 2006
- Princeton Lectures in Finance, 2008
- Ely Lecture, American Economic Association, 2016
- Arrow Lectures, Stanford University, 2017

=== Personal life ===
Campbell is married with four adult children and two grandchildren. He lives in Lexington, Massachusetts.

== Activities ==
Campbell is known for his research in financial economics, macroeconomics, and econometrics. He concentrates on asset pricing, portfolio choice for long-term investors, and household finance.

Campbell co-edited the American Economic Review from 1991 to 1993 and edited the Review of Economics and Statistics from 1996 to 2002. He served on the executive committee of the American Economic Association from 2016 to 2018, and chaired the Association's Ad Hoc Committee to Consider a Code of Professional Conduct during this period. Campbell was Chairman of the Department of Economics at Harvard from 2009 to 2012 and served on the board of the Harvard Management Company from 2004 to 2011. He co-founded Arrowstreet Capital, a quantitative asset management company, in 1999 and co-directed the firm's research through 2023.

== Books ==
- The Econometrics of Financial Markets (with Andrew Lo and Craig MacKinlay, Princeton University Press 1997)
- Strategic Asset Allocation: Portfolio Choice for Long-Term Investors (with Luis Viceira, Oxford University Press 2002)
- The Squam Lake Report: Fixing the Financial System (with the Squam Lake Group of financial economists, PUP 2010)
- Financial Decisions and Markets: A Course in Asset Pricing (PUP 2018)
- Fixed: Why Personal Finance is Broken and How to Make It Work for Everyone (with Tarun Ramadorai, PUP 2025)
