= Brewin Dolphin =

British investment management firm

RBC Brewin Dolphin
- Formerly: Brewin Dolphin
- Company type: Subsidiary
- Industry: Investment management
- Founded: 1762; 264 years ago
- Headquarters: London, England, UK
- Key people: Robin Beer (CEO)
- Revenue: ▲£405.9 million (2021)
- Operating income: ▲£74.0 million (2021)
- Net income: ▲£55.3 million (2021)
- AUM: ▲£51.7 billion (2022)
- Parent: Royal Bank of Canada (2022-present)
- Website: www.brewin.co.uk

RBC Brewin Dolphin (the trading name for Brewin Dolphin Holdings) is one of the largest British wealth management firms with over 30 offices throughout the UK, Jersey and Ireland, and c. 2,000 employees. It provides investment management and financial planning services to individuals, companies, intermediaries and charities.

On 27 September 2022, Brewin Dolphin was acquired by the Royal Bank of Canada; the company has since been known as "RBC Brewin Dolphin".

== History ==
The business can trace its origins back to the establishment of the stockbroking firm of John Dawes, a founder of the London Stock Exchange, in 1762. His firm evolved through many partner changes to become Wontner, Dolphin & Francis in 1970. In 1974 Brewin & Co merged with Wontner, Dolphin & Francis to form Brewin Dolphin. The business was incorporated in 1987 and acquired by Scandinavian Bank the same year. It was then the subject of a management buy-out from Scandinavian Bank in 1992 and was first listed on the London Stock Exchange in 1994.

It acquired Bell Lawrie, a Scottish firm of investment managers, in 1993. It went on to buy Wise Speke, an investment manager operating in the North of England, in 1998 and Popes, a firm based in Stoke-on-Trent, in 2002. It sold Stocktrade to Alliance Trust Savings in 2015. It then acquired Duncan Lawrie Asset Management, a firm operating in London, in December 2016 and Investec Wealth Management, a firm operating in Ireland, in October 2019. Other acquisitions include IFA firms Aylwin (2018), Epoch Wealth Management (2019), and actuarial consultancy Mathieson Consulting (2019).

In March 2022, RBC made a recommended offer for the company worth £1.6 billion, subject to regulatory and shareholder approval. The necessary approvals were secured in September 2022.
