= Taquanta =

South African asset management company

Taquanta Investment Holdings
- Type: Private
- Industry: Asset management Financial services
- Founded: 2007; 19 years ago
- Headquarters: Cape Town, South Africa
- Area served: South Africa
- Key people: Sebenzile Matsebula (Chairperson); Justin Kretzschmar (CEO)
- Services: Investment management
- AUM: R280 billion (2026)
- Subsidiaries: Taquanta Asset Managers
- Website: www.taquanta.co.za

Taquanta, officially Taquanta Investment Holdings, is a South African investment holding company. Founded in 2007 and headquartered in Cape Town, the firm, through its subsidiaries, had total assets under management (AUM) of over R280 billion in 2026.

== History ==
The businesses that later formed Taquanta originated from a 1997 merger involving Syfrets, UAL Merchant Bank, Nedbank, and Investment Bank. In 2003, the merged operations were restructured into Nedbank Treasury Asset Management, Nedcor Treasury Management Services, and NIB Securities.

In 2004, a black economic empowerment consortium known as Taquanta acquired minority shareholdings in the three businesses, which were subsequently renamed Taquanta Asset Managers, Taquanta Treasury Solutions, and Taquanta Securities. Nedcor retained majority stakes in the asset management and treasury services businesses, while the ownership of NIB Securities was divided among the consortium, Nedcor, and Old Mutual.

In 2007, Taquanta Investment Holdings was established as an independent holding company after acquiring Nedbank's majority shareholdings in Taquanta Asset Managers, Taquanta Treasury Solutions, and Taquanta Securities. The transaction was partly financed through preference shares subscribed for by Nedbank. Justin Kretzschmar, who had been Acting CEO since March 2007, became head of the new holding company in August that year.

By 2008, Taquanta had repaid the vendor financing used for the buyout, completing the group's transition to financial independence from Nedbank. At the time, the company described itself as a black-owned financial services group.

In 2014, Taquanta Treasury Solutions was sold to its management.

In 2017, ZICO Investments' shareholding in Taquanta was bought out proportionately by the remaining shareholders. The following year, Taquanta introduced an employee share scheme. Through this, 11 employees received direct equity ownership, as part of the company's succession and ownership transformation strategy.

In April 2021, Taquanta Investment Holdings acquired Ngwedi Investment Managers from Ngwedi Capital Holdings.

In June 2023, the company ranked tenth among South African asset managers in terms of total assets under management for South African clients, at approximately R255.1 billion. The survey's figures included domestic, African, and international assets managed for those clients.

== Operations ==
Taquanta provides investment management services to institutional and corporate clients, using fixed-income, multi-asset, index-tracking, and equity strategies. The group's total assets under management in 2026 was over R280 billion.

== Structure ==
Taquanta consists of multiple legal entities, with Taquanta Asset Managers being a subsidiary of Taquanta Investment Holdings. In 2024, the shareholders of Taquanta included DEC Investment Holding Company, Taquanta Black Staff, and Work Biz Trading.

== See also ==
- Banking in South Africa
