= Guardian Capital Group =

Financial services company

- Type: Public
- Traded as: TSX: GCG
- Industry: Financial services
- Founded: 1962; 64 years ago
- Headquarters: Toronto, Ontario
- Key people: George Mavroudis (CEO)
- Revenue: ▲CA$241.2 million (2023)
- Net income: ▲CA$59.8 million (2023)
- AUM: ▲CA$165 billion (As of September 2024)

Guardian Capital Group, founded in 1962, operates several fully owned subsidiaries whose operations are to provide investment management services, financial advisory services, retail distribution of mutual funds, insurance, and general corporate services. Guardian Capital Group is headquartered in Toronto, Ontario, Canada, and became publicly listed on the Toronto Stock Exchange in 1969. As of December 31, 2015, the company has $24.2 billion in assets under management.

== History ==
In May 2001, Guardian Capital Group sold a portion of its retail mutual fund business with roughly $2 billion in assets under management to the Bank of Montreal in exchange for 4.96 million common shares, worth roughly $180 million. Guardian Capital LP, one of Canada's largest investment management firms and a subsidiary of Guardian Capital Group, actively manages many of BMO's mutual fund products.

In January 2011, George Mavroudis was appointed President of Guardian Capital Group after the passing of John Christodoulou. Mavroudis has been with the company since 2005 in the position of Senior Vice-President, Strategic Planning and Development. Prior to joining Guardian Capital Group, Mavroudis held previous appointments as a managing director with J.P. Morgan Asset Management in its London, New York City, Moscow, and Toronto offices.

In November 2017, Guardian Capital Group acquired a majority interest in Alta Capital Management LLC, an independent U.S.-based asset management firm. Alta Capital specializes in high-quality growth equity strategies and managed approximately $3 billion in assets at the time of the acquisition. The transaction was part of Guardian's strategy to enhance its investment management capabilities and expand its footprint in the U.S. market.

In March 2021, Guardian Capital Group completed the acquisition of BNY Mellon's Canadian wealth management business. The acquisition included BNY Mellon Wealth Management Advisory Services and its related operations, adding significant expertise and client assets to Guardian's existing platform. This strategic move strengthened Guardian's position in the Canadian wealth management market.

In June 2022, Guardian Capital Group purchased a 60% stake in Rae & Lipskie Investment Counsel Inc., an Ontario-based private wealth management firm.

In December 2023, Guardian Capital Group announced the sale of its Worldsource Wealth Management division to Desjardins Group for $750 million. The acquisition, which included Worldsource Securities Inc., Worldsource Financial Management Inc., and related entities, was aimed at enhancing Desjardins’ wealth management offerings. Guardian Capital stated that the sale was part of its strategy to focus on its core investment management operations.

In January 2024, Guardian Capital Group completed the acquisition of Sterling Capital Management LLC from Truist Financial Corporation. Sterling Capital Management, a U.S.-based investment management firm, added approximately $76 billion in assets under management to Guardian’s portfolio. The acquisition is part of Guardian’s strategy to expand its presence in the U.S. market and strengthen its investment management capabilities.

== Key subsidiaries ==
- Guardian Capital LP - Investment management firm for institutional and retail clients.
- Guardian Capital Advisors - Investment management firm for high-net-worth individuals.
- Alexandria Bancorp Ltd. - Fully licensed bank located in the Cayman Islands and Barbados providing corporate governance advisory, investment management, and banking services.
- Rae & Lipskie Investment Counsel Inc. - Ontario-based private wealth management firm.
- Alta Capital Management LLC - U.S.-based asset management firm specializing in high-quality growth equity strategies.
- Sterling Capital Management LLC - U.S.-based investment management firm managing approximately $76 billion in assets.

== See also ==
- List of asset management firms
