= Thornburg Investment Management, Inc. =

Private independent investment management company

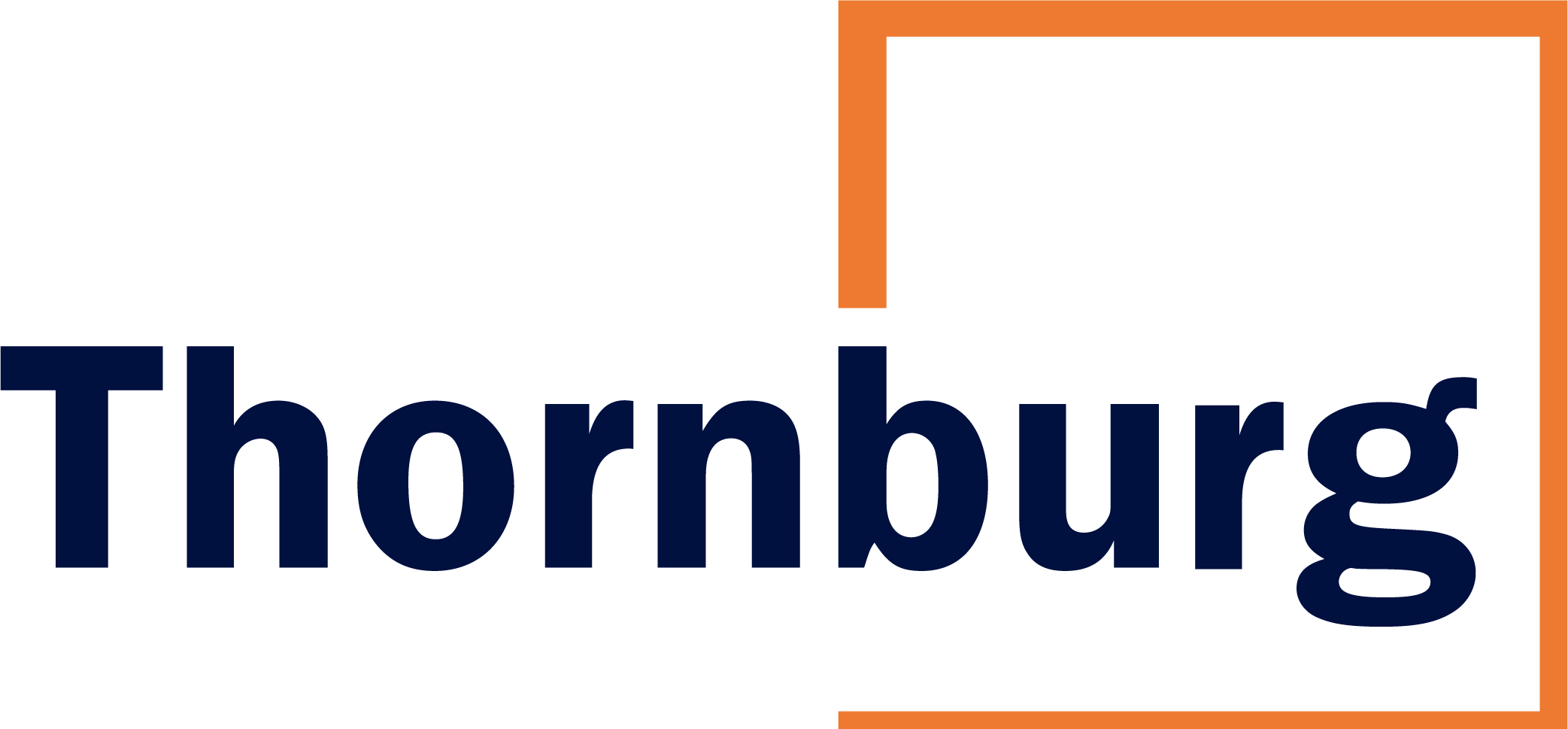
- Type: Private limited liability partnership
- Industry: Investment management
- Founded: June 1982; 44 years ago
- Founder: Garrett Thornburg (Chairman)
- Headquarters: Santa Fe, New Mexico, United States
- Key people: Mark Zinkula (CEO); Brian McMahon (Vice-Chairman); Matt Burdett (Head of Equities); Christian Hoffmann (Head of Fixed Income); Nimish Bhatt (CFO); Amy Callow (General Counsel); Jesse Brownell (Global Head of Distribution); Michael Corrao (Director of Global Communications)
- AUM: US $60 billion
- Number of employees: 240
- Website: www.thornburg.com

Thornburg Investment Management is a US-based private, independent investment management company. As of May 31, 2026, it had assets under management and advisement totaling $60 billion. It was founded in 1982 by Garrett Thornburg and is headquartered in Santa Fe, New Mexico with additional offices in London and Hong Kong.

== History ==
In 1982, American investor Garrett Thornburg established Thornburg Investment Management in Santa Fe, New Mexico.

The first strategy was a joint venture between Thornburg and Reich & Tang to create the Daily Tax Free Income Fund, a high-yielding tax-exempt money market fund. Brian McMahon, now the firm's Vice Chairman and Chief Investment Strategist, led the Daily Tax Free Income Fund’s first purchase from Norwest Bank, closing the deal the day after Thanksgiving 1982, just hours after the bank was nearly destroyed by fire.

By 1984, McMahon moved to Santa Fe to join Thornburg and the firm's first employee, Dawn Fischer. Together, they filed a prospectus to launch Thornburg's first mutual fund, the Tax Free Municipal Lease Fund, and formed Thornburg Securities Corporation to distribute the fund.

After raising $6.7 million, the Tax Free Municipal Lease Fund officially launched on September 28, 1984. On June 28, 1985, the firm changed the fund's name from the Tax Free Municipal Lease Fund to the Thornburg Limited Term Municipal Fund.

In 1995, Thornburg hired Bill Fries to create its first value equity fund. The firm launched its first equity fund, the Thornburg Value Fund, on October 2, 1995. It launched the Thornburg International Value Fund in 1998, which was renamed the Thornburg International Equity Fund on February 1, 2021. Fries was named Morningstar’s 2003 International Fund Manager of the Year.

Thornburg's flagship multi-asset portfolio, Thornburg Investment Income Builder Fund, was launched in 2002. As of February 2026, the fund has over $22 billion in assets.

The Thornburg Campus, the first commercial LEED (Leadership in Energy and Environmental Design) Gold building in New Mexico, was designed by world-renowned architect Ricardo Legorreta, and opened in 2009.

On September 30, 2015, the company launched Thornburg Better World International Fund. The fund is based on ESG investing and has regularly outperformed its peers, garnering US Lipper Awards in 2023, 2024 and 2025 for its returns.

On July 28, 2021, Thornburg announced the successful completion of the initial public offering of the Thornburg Income Builder Opportunities Trust (NASDAQ: TBLD), raising $580 million by selling 29,000,000 common shares at $20 per share.

Thornburg formed a joint venture in September 2024 with Bow River Capital to provide private credit solutions that support the needs of lower- and middle-market businesses.

In January 2025, the company launched its first two Exchange-Traded Funds (ETFs), Thornburg International Equity ETF (TXUE) and Thornburg International Growth ETF (TXUG). A month later in February 2025, Thornburg launched two fixed income ETFs, Thornburg Core Plus Bond ETF (TPLS) and Thornburg Multi Sector Bond ETF (TMB). Thornburg rang Nasdaq's closing bell on October 7, 2025, in celebration of the ETF launches. As of June 2026, Thornburg's ETF platform has grown to over $700 million in assets.

Thornburg and Frankfurt, Germany-based and leading third-party marketer Active Fund Placement announced a partnership in June 2025 to bring Thornburg’s flagship global equity income and multi-sector fixed income strategies to institutional and professional clients in Germany and Austria. In October 2025, Thornburg announced a partnership with Capital Strategies Partners to expand Thornburg’s distribution in Italy and the Middle East. In February 2026, Thornburg formed a strategic partnership with Sweden-based Boden Capital to expand its presence among institutional investors across the Nordic region. The collaboration will give investors in the region broader access to Thornburg’s UCITS fund range, including the Global Opportunities Fund and the Equity Income Builder Fund, as well as additional actively managed global equity and fixed income strategies.

Thornburg filed to add ETF share classes to two of its mutual funds on January 21, 2026, becoming the third asset manager after Dimensional Fund Advisors and F/m Investments to disclose its plan to adopt the multi-class structure since receiving preliminary approval from the Securities and Exchange Commission. On April 1, 2026, Thornburg announced that it added two ETF share classes of mutual funds, Thornburg American Opportunities Fund (TAOZ) and Thornburg Focus Growth Fund (TFGZ), making the company among the first to launch actively managed ETF share classes and the first one to list them on Nasdaq.

In February 2026, SS&C Technologies Holdings, Inc. and Thornburg launched a generative AI-powered sales enablement solution that integrates directly into CRM systems.

On June 23, 2026, Thornburg launched the Thornburg Premium Income Builder ETF (NYSE: THOR), a new actively managed global equity ETF that combines dividend-paying global equities with a flexible, fundamentally driven options strategy designed to generate income while maintaining participation in long-term market appreciation. The fund is managed by industry veterans Brian McMahon and Matt Burdett, who currently oversee Thornburg's flagship Income Builder strategy, drawing upon Thornburg's decades of experience managing income-oriented portfolios, including the firm's flagship Thornburg Investment Income Builder strategy.

== Overview ==
Thornburg Investment Management is an employee-owned firm offering mutual funds, ETFs, closed-end funds, institutional accounts, separate accounts and UCITS funds for non-U.S. investors. It manages 21 mutual funds, seven ETFs, one closed-end fund, and billions of dollars in separately managed accounts assets. The company has clients across the United States, Europe, Asia and Latin America.

Thornburg Investment Management has over $60 billion under management and advisement and employs 240 people.

== Recognition ==
In 2008, Thornburg Investment Management won a Lipper Award for best large fixed-income group. The Thornburg Investment Income Builder Fund was awarded the 2019 Lipper Fund Award in the United Kingdom. Thornburg Better World International Fund garnered US Lipper Awards in 2023, 2024 and 2025 for its returns.

It was named Philanthropist of the Year by Journal North and the St. Vincent Hospital Foundation in 2017.

Thornburg's philanthropy program was awarded a prestigious STAR Award by the Investment Management Education Alliance (IMEA) in 2021 and 2023. In 2024, With Intelligence named Thornburg's philanthropy program the Best Philanthropic Initiative at their annual Asset Manager Sales, Marketing and Leadership Awards. In 2025, Thornburg's philanthropy program was a finalist for a Wealth Management Industry Award, an IMEA Star Award and an MMI/Barron's Industry Award.

With Intelligence named Thornburg a finalist in four 2026 Mutual Fund and ETF Award categories: Multi-asset mutual fund of the year for Thornburg Investment Income Builder Fund (TIBIX); Newcomer ETF Firm of the Year: Thornburg; Newcomer ETF of the Year: Thornburg International Equity ETF (TXUE); PR Campaign of the Year: Thornburg. Thornburg captured two wins for best multi-asset mutual fund of the year for Thornburg Investment Income Builder Fund (TIBIX), beating other category finalists Abraham Trading's Fortress Fund (FORKX), Kensington Dynamic Allocation (KAGIX), and Potomac Defensive Bull Fund (CRDBX), and the best newcomer ETF firm of the year, a victory over Russell Investments, WEBs Investments, and VistaShares ETFs.
