= Nuvama Group =

Indian wealth management firm

- Company type: Public
- Traded as: NSE: NUVAMA; BSE: 543988
- ISIN: INE531F01015
- Industry: Investment management
- Founded: 1993
- Headquarters: Mumbai, Maharashtra, India
- Number of locations: 100+ offices
- Area served: India; Hong Kong; Singapore; UAE; United Kingdom; United States
- Key people: Ashish Kehair (MD & CEO)
- Services: Wealth management Asset management Asset services Capital markets
- Revenue: ▲₹2,901 crore (US$300 million) (FY2025)
- Net income: ▲₹986 crore (US$100 million) (FY2025)
- AUM: ▲₹4.6 trillion (US$48 billion) (June 2025)
- Owner: PAG (54.74%)
- Number of employees: 3,400 (June 2025)
- Rating: AA− (CRISIL); A1+ (ICRA)
- Website: nuvama.com

Nuvama Wealth Management Limited (doing business as Nuvama Group) is an Indian multinational wealth management company headquartered in Mumbai. Established in 1993, the company offers services in wealth management, asset management, asset servicing, and capital markets.

As of June 2025, Nuvama reported assets under management of approximately ₹4.6 trillion (US$48 billion). Since 2021, the company has been majority owned by PAG, a multinational investment firm.

== History ==
The company was established in August 1993 as Kayjay Financial Research Services Private Limited. In 1998, its name was changed to KJS Securities Private Limited and then to Rooshnil Securities Private Limited.

In 2002, the company was acquired by the Edelweiss Group, and changed its name to Edelweiss Securities Limited in 2004. During the fiscal year 2009–10, it acquired Arum Investments Private Limited.

In 2021, multinational investment firm PAG acquired a controlling stake in the company from Edelweiss Group and minority shareholders-Kora Management and Sanaka Capital. In 2022, the company was renamed as Nuvama Wealth Management Limited, before being listed on the NSE and BSE on 26 September 2023.

In 2024, Nuvama formed a 50:50 joint venture with Cushman & Wakefield to establish a real estate fund. Later that year, Nuvama established a wholly-owned subsidiary based in Dubai International Finance Centre.

== Subsidiaries and services ==
Nuvama is engaged in wealth management services through two divisions: Nuvama Wealth for HNIs and Nuvama Private for UHNIs. In 2021, it established a wholly-owned subsidiary called Nuvama Asset Management, which provides alternative investment services through private and public markets, and commercial real estate assets. The Nuvama Capital Markets division includes Nuvama Institutional Equities, which is engaged in equity research and broking business; Nuvama Investment Banking, which includes equity/debt capital markets, private equity, and M&A advisory services; and Nuvama Asset Services, which provides clearing, custody, fund accounting, and reporting services to financial institutions.
