= Arrowstreet Capital =

Asset management firm based in Boston

Arrowstreet Capital, Limited Partnership
- Company type: Private
- Industry: Investment Management
- Founded: June 1999; 27 years ago
- Founders: John Y. Campbell; Bruce Clarke; Peter Rathjens
- Headquarters: John Hancock Tower, Boston, Massachusetts, U.S.
- Key people: Bruce Clarke (Chairman); Brandon J. Hall (CEO)
- AUM: US$285 billion (April 8, 2026 filing)
- Number of employees: 500 (2026)
- Website: www.arrowstreetcapital.com

Arrowstreet Capital (Arrowstreet) is an American investment management firm based in Boston. The firm is noted for its usage of quantitative analysis in its approach to investing as well as maintaining a low profile despite its large number of assets under management.

== Background ==
Arrowstreet was founded in 1999 by Bruce Clarke, the CEO of PanAgora Asset Management along with John Y. Campbell and Peter Rathjens who were also executives at the firm. Arrowstreet was established to manage money for institutional investors by investing in international and emerging market equities. Clients include the Oregon Public Employees Retirement System, CalPERS and Macquarie Group.

In 2002, Arrowstreet launched its hedge fund business. It had to assure its clients that the new business would not drain talent from its traditional asset management business or cause intra-office conflict with respect to compensation as the strategies were different.

Pensions & Investments noted that Arrowstreet makes use of computer models to allow the firm to perform well in different market environments and tends to avoid systematic biases such as favouring certain stocks. The models appear to take "non-linear" factors into account to a greater extent than its peers. During the value equity rally between 2003 and 2006 after the Dot-com bubble, Arrowstreet lagged behind peers such as Acadian Asset Management and LSV Asset Management when it came to performance. However, when it came to a volatile market cycle such as the 2008 financial crisis, Arrowstreet had a much stronger performance over its competitors.

With regards to stock selection, the investment team at Arrowstreet would use computer models to go through thousands of stocks and rank them by attractiveness based on selected criteria. For the core global equities fund, the team narrowed down the selection to 150-200 stocks.

In 2008, Arrowstreet repurchased shares from outside owners to become 100% employee owned.

In March 2011, former Treasury official, Anthony Ryan left his position of chief administrative officer at Fidelity Investments to join Arrowstreet. Ryan who previously worked with Arrowstreet's co-founders at PanAgora now serves as the CEO of Arrowstreet after Clarke stepped down from his position as CEO in 2014.

Arrowstreet maintains a low profile and its clients have stated the investment process of the firm is like a black box as it is difficult to ascertain in detail how the firm operates.
