= Lionsgate Academy =

Minnesota public charter school

Location
- Minnetonka, Minnesota; Shoreview, Minnesota; North St. Paul Minnesota United States

District information
- Type: Public Charter School
- Grades: 7–12
- Established: 2008

Students and staff
- Students: Shoreview 186 (2025-2026) Minnetonka 150 (2025-2026) Lynx Shoreview 20 (2025-2026)
- Staff: 200+

Other information
- Website: lionsgateacademy.org

Lionsgate Academy (District 4183) is a Minnesota public charter school which serves grades from 7 up to 12. Established in 2008, Lionsgate Academy is open to students of all abilities: however, their program is inclusively designed to meet the unique needs of students on the autism spectrum. The school has multiple locations.

== History ==
Lionsgate was founded by Bernadette Groh and Tamara Phillips, with the aim to educate students with autism. The first meetings regarding the school's founding were held in July 2006, which launched the school's first board. Following the creation of the mission regarding impacts on both the lives of teenagers with autism during the high school days, as well as an adult, the founders wanted a name that would reflect to their mission as well as their particular needs.

The name Lionsgate Academy originated from the translation of the founders' children's names, Ari, which translated to 'lion' in Hebrew and Arabic. Soon after, an application to the Minneapolis Board of Education was written and completed by July 2007, with acceptance announced in October 2007. With the announcement of the acceptance, word of the school was spread via the Star Tribune and other newspapers.

First opening on September 2, 2008, to seventy students in grades 7 to 10, the school began rapid growth, reaching 151 students by the school year of 2012 to 2013.

In 2011, the school saw its first graduating class, which resulted in the formation of the AIM Program, which is a transitional program for students seeking to become more independent in the areas of Independent Living, Employment, and Post Secondary Education. The program AIM serves students from 18 to 21 years of age, and is located off-site.

For the school's first eight years, it was located at 3420 Nevada Avenue North in Crystal, Minnesota, in a shared building with the local Cornerstone Church. The building, which is now Beacon Academy, was originally Crystal Heights Elementary School, before its purchase by the church, making it particularly suitable for Lionsgate Academy.

In November 2015, Lionsgate leased a former office building at 5605 Green Circle Drive in Minnetonka, and opened in the school year of 2016. Wellington Wealth Management, Inc. owns the building.

At the Ribbon Cutting for the school's Green Circle Drive location in November 2016, Lionsgate announced an expansion on the east side of the Twin Cities. The school, which will initially serve grades 7 to 10, like Lionsgate when it first opened, opened in the school year of 2018 to 2019. It is located at 599 Cardigan Rd. in Shoreview.

A second location opened in Shoreview, Minnesota in 2018, to accommodate more families living on the east side of the Twin Cities.
