= Income Research + Management =

Asset management firm based in Boston

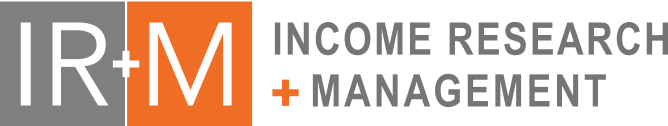
- Trade name: Income Research + Management
- Company type: Private
- Industry: Investment Management
- Founded: 1987; 39 years ago
- Founders: John Sommers; Jack Sommers
- Headquarters: Winthrop Center, Boston, Massachusetts, United States
- Key people: Jack Sommers (Chairperson); Bill O'Malley (CEO)
- AUM: US$102 billion (June 2024)
- Number of employees: 200+ (June 2024)
- Website: www.incomeresearch.com

Income Research + Management (IR+M) is an American investment management firm based in Boston. The firm specializes in active management fixed income strategies for institutional investors.

== History ==
In 1987, IR+M was founded as a private investment firm by former Putnam Advisory CEO, John Sommers with his son Jack to specialize in the USD fixed income market.

In 1994, Bill O’Malley joined IR+M from Wellington Management Company as its third professional. He was Jack's roommate in their first year at Amherst College.

In the early days of the firm, it followed a flat organization structure where employees had many job duties and roles were not very specific about job duties.

In 2001, John and Jack Sommers began selling equity in the firm to its employees with O’Malley being the first employee to acquire a stake. This was done to dilute their holdings as other employees buy into the firm so it can remain focused solely on fixed income investments.

After the 2008 financial crisis, IR+M had significant inflows from investors; its assets rose from $14 billion in 2008 to $21 billion in 2009. Investors had lost confidence in their investment managers but did not want to sell as bond prices were depressed with poor liquidity. IR+M offered to take in portfolios and set up Treasury-only separately managed accounts for investors that migrated.

In October 2019, IR+M underwent a management change by formalizing its senior team and clarifying the titles in part to satisfy investors desire for transparency. O’Malley became the firm's first ever CEO and Jack Sommers became executive chairperson. O'Malley has stated the firm wants to stay private "forever" and has supported this continuing to distribute equity to its employees. At the time, of its 175 employees, 55 had equity in the firm. This was seen as a possible reflection of the firm's growth.

In 2023, IR+M moved its headquarters to the Winthrop Center which was geared towards a hybrid work setup.

As of June 30, 2023, IR+M is approximately 84.78% employee-owned by 68 employees.

== Investment strategy ==
IR+M believes that careful security selection and active portfolio risk management will lead to superior returns over the long-term. Due to difficulty in predicting future interest rate changes, it keeps duration and yield curve exposure neutral to the benchmark. The research process combines quantitative and qualitative analysis and is based on fundamentals. Investment decisions do not use black box models or rely heavily on quantitative ones.

Due to IR+M 's size, it can invest in smaller issues and securities with creative structures that larger investment managers cannot do. As a result, in 2019, even with investors’ move to passive management and a market with low interest rates, IR+M generated 60 basis points of alpha on its core strategies.
