= Polen Capital =

Asset management firm based in Florida

Polen Capital Management, LLC
- Type: Private
- Industry: Investment Management
- Founded: 1979; 47 years ago
- Founder: David Polen
- Headquarters: Boca Raton, Florida, U.S.
- Key people: Stan Moss (CEO)
- AUM: US$30 billion (2026)
- Number of employees: 150 (2026)
- Website: www.polencapital.com

Polen Capital is an American investment management firm headquartered in Boca Raton, Florida. The firm's main strategy is growth investing in a limited number of growth equities. In recent years, the firm has expanded into investments in the credit market.

Outside the U.S., the firm has offices in London and Hong Kong.

== Background ==
In 1979, Polen Capital was founded in New York by David Polen.

In 1989, Polen Capital launched its flagship fund, the Focus Growth Strategy, which invested in growth equities based in the U.S. It was developed by Polen to follow a high-conviction, low-turnover approach where only between 100 and 150 stocks are invested in and are held for a long period of time. It would focus only on companies with strong sustainable growth potential. Thousands of stocks are observed and a filter is applied where only a small selection is bought. From 1989 to 2020, the fund had a compounded average annual return of 15%.

In 2002, Polen Capital moved its headquarters to Boca Raton in Florida due to it having a more affordable cost of living.

In 2012, Polen died and was succeeded by his co-manager, Damon Ficklin, and CEO Stan Moss.

In 2014, Polen Capital explored the idea of making a global version of its US-focused flagship fund and in 2015, launched the Global Growth Strategy fund.

In 2016, London-based investment company, iM Square (now iM Global Partner), acquired a 20% stake of Polen Capital.

In December 2021, Polen Capital diversified into the credit market business after it acquired DDJ Capital Management a Boston-based high-yield credit investment firm. It was rebranded to Polen Capital Credit.

In March 2023, Polen Capital acquired LGM's emerging markets equities team as well as their funds from Columbia Threadneedle Investments so it could expand into the Asia market. The LGM funds were rebranded under the Polen name. At the same time, the firm opened an office in Hong Kong.

As of May 2023, the firm's asset allocation was stated to be 85% in growth equities and 15% in credit. There are long-term goals to have a more balanced asset allocation as well to move away from a US focus.

In June 2023, Polen Capital established a strategic partnership with Income Partners, a Hong Kong-based investment firm focusing on Asian Credit. It involved Polen Capital investing an unspecified sum into Income Partners.

In February 2024, after UK-based Somerset Capital (founded by Jacob Rees-Mogg and Dominic Johnson) closed due to St. James's Place plc severing ties with it, Polen Capital acquired its funds and portfolio managers.

Although Polen Capital has demonstrated strong returns, due to its high-conviction investment strategy, it has also suffered from significant underperformance several times. From 2003 to 2006, the firm's performance lagged the S&P 500. Due to the 2008 financial crisis, the firm's assets under management shrunk to less than one seventh of its size from 2004. In 2013, the firm also underperformed the S&P 500 by 10.2%.

Polen Capital is majority-owned by its employees.
