= Mawer Investment Management =

Canada asset management firm

Mawer Investment Management Ltd.
- Formerly: Mawer & Associates
- Company type: Private
- Industry: Investment Management
- Founded: 1974; 51 years ago
- Founder: Charles Mawer
- Headquarters: Calgary, Alberta, Canada
- Key people: Craig Senyk (Chairman); Jim Hall (President)
- AUM: CA$90.4 billion (September 2024)
- Number of employees: 280+ (2024)
- Website: www.mawer.com

Mawer Investment Management (Mawer) is a Canadian investment management firm headquartered in Calgary, Alberta. It acts as a subadvisor for Manulife Investment Management.

== History ==
In 1974, stockbroker Charles Mawer founded the company originally as Mawer & Associates. It focused on looking after money for high-net-worth individuals and pension funds in the form of investment funds.

In 2005, ten years after its founder retired from running it, Mawer was selected by Manulife Investment Management to manage its investment funds in a subadvisory capacity.

In November 2018, Mawer hired Bank of Nova Scotia to explore options such as a sale; this came at a time when other Canadian asset management firms were being acquired. However, in December, it decided to remain independent.

With the philosophy of buying strong, growing companies at cheap prices, it has been noted for charging low management fees compared to its peers. Due to lower commissions, financial advisers have avoided selling Mawer funds. The partnership between Mawer and Manulife have allowed more generous and less visible compensation structures for funds.
