= Thomas H. Bailey =

American billionaire

- Born: July 3, 1937 (age 89)
- Died: 08/30/2025
- Education: Michigan State University; Ivey School of Business
- Occupation: financier
- Known for: founder of Janus Capital Group
- Spouse: divorced
- Children: 2

Thomas H. Bailey (born July 3, 1937) is an American financier, noted for founding Denver-based Janus Capital Group, one of the largest mutual fund institutions in the United States. In 2015, Bailey had an estimated net worth of $1.1 billion.

Bailey has a bachelor's degree from Michigan State University and an MBA from Ivey Business School at the University of Western Ontario.
