= Artradis =

Artradis Fund Management
- Founded: 2001
- Founders: Stephen Diggle; Richard Magides
- Defunct: 2011
- Headquarters: Singapore
- Website: www.artradis.com

Artradis Fund Management (often referred to simply as Artradis), founded in 2001, was an Asian long volatility biased multi strategy alternative asset manager with operations centered in Singapore and presence in the BVI and Switzerland. Its flagship funds, Barracuda and AB2, conducted market-neutral trading strategies including index arbitrage, warrant arbitrage, stock class arbitrage, convertible bond arbitrage, volatility arbitrage, volatility dispersion, and dividend arbitrage. A common theme through these strategies was to be long tail risk, primarily through volatility.

The company was co-founded in 2001 by Stephen Diggle and Richard Magides and grew assets under management from US$4 million to US$4.7 billion at its peak in 2008, principally in its flagship Barracuda and AB2 funds. These funds halved in size to US$2 billion in 2009 as a result of withdrawals and underperformance, more than halved again in 2010 to US$800 million, and were finally closed in early 2011. Over the life of the funds the net profit to investors exceeded US$2.7 billion, all in years leading to 2007 and 2008, which "were spectacular" according to Mr. Diggle, and the founders made Forbes' Wall Street's 20 Highest Earners by earning US$90 million each in a single year, 2008.

Following the performance in 2007, Artradis’ AB2 fund won the ‘best Asian hedge fund’ award at the Asian Masters of Hedge awards. The AB2 fund also won Eurekahedge's ‘best Asian hedge fund’ award for the performance the subsequent year. The Barracuda fund won the AsiaHedge ‘fund of the year’ award in 2008 as well as the Asian Investor fund of the year 2007.

Investors who purchased units in 2008 or subsequent year lost a significant part of their investment before the funds were shut down: the AB2 Fund was down 23 percent in 2010 and 27.5% in 2009 (cumulative loss of 44%), while the Barracuda fund lost 17% in 2010 and nearly 14% in 2009 (cumulative loss of 29%).
