= Alliance Witan =

British investment trust

Alliance Witan plc
- Formerly: The Alliance Trust Public Limited Company (1888–2006); Alliance Trust plc (2006–2024)
- Type: Public
- Traded as: LSE: ALW; FTSE 100 Component
- Industry: Financial services
- Founded: 21 April 1888; 138 years ago
- Headquarters: London, England, UK
- Key people: Dean Buckley (chairman)
- Products: Investment Trust
- Revenue: ▲£97.9 million (2025)
- Operating income: ▲£83.4 million (2025)
- Net income: ▲£73.0 million (2025)
- Total assets: ▼£5,490.1 million (2025)
- Total equity: ▼£5,112.7 million (2025)
- Website: www.alliancewitan.com

Alliance Witan plc, formerly Alliance Trust plc, is a publicly traded investment and financial services company, established in 1888 and was headquartered in Dundee, Scotland until management was transferred to Willis Towers Watson in London. It is listed on the London Stock Exchange and is a constituent of the FTSE 100 Index. It is one of the largest investment trusts in the UK.

== History ==
The Alliance Trust plc was formed by the 1888 merger of three Dundee-based mortgage and land companies: the Dundee Investment Company, the Dundee Mortgage and Trust Investment Company and the Oregon and Washington Trust (which was set up to provide loans to immigrant farmers on the West Coast of the United States). Many prominent figures in Dundee invested some of their money in the Alliance Trust and its predecessors, including merchants, ship owners, textile manufacturers and businessman such as Sir John Leng. The company subsequently expanded into other asset classes. In 1918 the firm agreed to share premises and other costs with the Western & Hawaiian Investment Company, a mortgage lender which initially focused its business on sugar planters in Hawaii before expanding. Five years later it was renamed The Second Alliance Trust, although no formal merger between the two took place until 2006.

The Trusts later moved into fixed income investing in the 1920s and 30s, before adding significant quantities of shares to their portfolios in the late 1950s. A savings division was established by Alliance Trust in 1986, offering pensions and other investment products.

A formal merger with The Second Alliance Trust was finally conducted in 2006, as the investment strategies of the two companies had come to closely resemble each other. Legally, the Second Alliance Trust became a private company, wholly owned by the Alliance Trust, and its shareholders became holders of new Alliance Trust shares.

The company left its headquarters of over 90 years, Meadow House in Dundee's Reform Street on 1 June 2009 for a purpose-built facility on 8 West Marketgait in Dundee City Centre.

Following the resignation of Katherine Garratt Cox, self-management of the trust ended, and management was transferred to Willis Towers Watson on 1 April 2017.

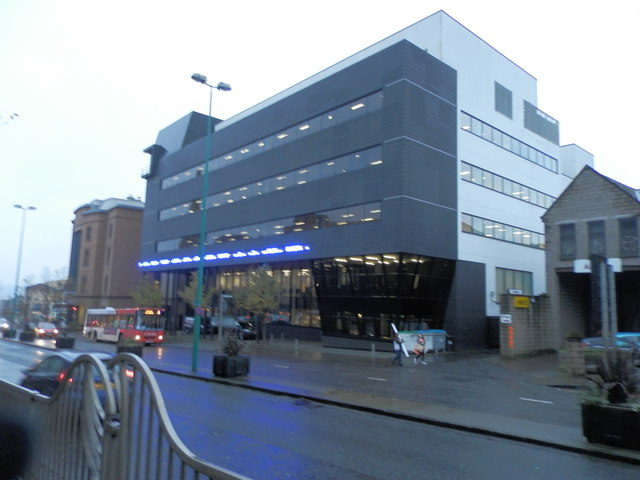
Former company offices at 8 West Marketgait, Dundee

In 2011, it was reported that University of Dundee Archive Services had become custodians of the Alliance Trust's extensive archives.

Following criticism by Elliott Advisors, an activist shareholder, Katherine Garrett-Cox stood down as Chief Executive and left the company in March 2016.

Dean Buckley succeeded Gregor Stewart as Chairman in January 2024.

In June 2024, it was announced that Alliance Trust would merge with Witan Investment Trust to create Alliance Witan. This would be achieved through the voluntary winding up of Witan Investment Trust. The company formally rebranded itself Alliance Witan on 11 October 2024, and four former directors of Witan were appointed as non-executive directors of Alliance Witan PLC.

== Investment strategy ==
In December 2016, the board announced that the Trust would change its investment philosophy to a multi-manager model in a bid to improve performance. In March 2017, the Trust's shareholders approved the change in approach. The Trust then formally appointed Willis Towers Watson (WTW) as investment manager with effect from 1 April 2017.

== Former operations ==
Alliance Trust Savings purchased Stocktrade from Brewin Dolphin in 2015 and sold it to Embark Group in 2019.

Until October 2018, Alliance Trust was the parent company of Alliance Trust Savings Limited, an execution-only trading platform. The business was sold to Interactive Investor for £40m; the sale included the office building at West Marketgait, Dundee.
