= Janus Capital Group =

Former American publicly owned investment firm headquartered in Denver, Colorado

Janus Capital Group Inc.
- Type: Public company
- Traded as: NYSE: JHG (formerly)
- Industry: Financial
- Founded: 1969; 57 years ago
- Founder: Thomas H. Bailey
- Fate: merged with Henderson Group, forming Janus Henderson in 2017
- Headquarters: Denver, Colorado, United States
- Revenue: $1,076 million (2015)
- AUM: $190.9 billion (2016)
- Number of employees: 1,272 (2016)
- Website: www.janus.com

Janus Capital Group, Inc. was an American publicly owned investment firm headquartered in Denver, Colorado. It was founded by Thomas H. Bailey as Stilwell Financial Incorporated in 1969. Outside the U.S., Janus had offices in Sydney, Paris, Zürich, Frankfurt, Dubai, Taipei, London, Milan, Tokyo, Hong Kong, Melbourne, and Singapore. It was a constituent of the S&P MidCap 400 Index.

It merged with Henderson Group in May 2017 to create Janus Henderson.

== History ==
Janus was founded by Thomas H. Bailey in 1969. A controlling interest was purchased by Kansas City Southern Industries in 1984. Kansas City Southern Industries then demerged its financial services businesses to create Stilwell Financial in 1999. Bailey stepped down as president and CEO in June 2002.

The company was renamed Janus Capital Group, following the integration of Janus Capital Corporation into its parent company, Stilwell Financial, in January 2003.

The Janus Fund opened in 1970 with approximately a few hundred thousand dollars in assets.

Further funds were launched in 1985, including the Janus Venture Fund, its first small cap equity fund, and the Janus Twenty Fund, its first concentrated equity fund.

In 1991, Janus launched a number of other new types of fund, including its first global equity fund, the Janus Worldwide Fund, its first international equity fund, the Janus Overseas Fund, and its first mid cap equity fund, the Janus Enterprise Fund. It also launched the Janus Aspen Series (JAS), a product line created for investors wanting to invest in Janus through variable insurance contracts or certain qualified retirement plans.

Myron Scholes, Nobel laureate and Ph.D., joined Janus as chief investment strategist on July 8, 2014.

On September 26, 2014, Bill Gross left Pimco to join Janus as manager of the Janus global unconstrained bond strategy.

In October 2014, Janus acquired VS Holdings, a company based in Darien, Connecticut, and its VelocityShares business.

In July 2015, Janus acquired a majority interest in Kapstream Capital, a fixed income specialist.

In February 2016, Janus launched a small cap growth and small cap/mid cap growth ETF, followed in June by four new ETFs around investment themes – long-term care, health and fitness, organic foods and personal care.

On October 3, 2016, Janus Capital Group Inc and Henderson Group plc announced their merger, creating Janus Henderson.
