= Cambridge Investment Research =

US-based broker-dealer and asset management firm headquartered in Fairfield, Iowa

- Type: Private
- Industry: Financial services
- Founded: 1981; 45 years ago
- Founder: Eric Schwartz
- Headquarters: Fairfield, Iowa, United States
- Key people: Eric Schwartz (Chairman); Amy Lynn Webber (CEO & President)
- Products: Broker-dealer services Asset management
- AUM: US$100 billion (2019)
- Parent: Cambridge Investment Group
- Website: www.joincambridge.com

Cambridge Investment Research Incorporation is a United States-based broker-dealer and asset management firm headquartered in Fairfield, Iowa. Founded in 1981, the company acts as a broker-dealer and manages investment assets through its subsidiary Cambridge Investment Research Advisors Inc.

It is one of the largest independent broker-dealers in the United States.

== History ==
Cambridge Investment Research was founded in 1981 by Eric Schwartz. The company was incorporated in Iowa in October 1995.

In April 2016, the U.S. Securities and Exchange Commission charged Cambridge Investment Research Advisors with failing to adequately supervise an employee who defrauded at least 47 advisory clients and engaged in unsuitable trading in some clients’ accounts. The company settled the case by paying a $225,000 penalty.

In January 2017, Schwartz stepped out of the CEO role and was made executive chairman, and Amy Webber was made CEO in addition to her role as president.

As of 2017, the company was re-structured as a holding company, Cambridge Investment Group, Inc., that comprised multiple broker-dealers and registered investment adviser subsidiaries, including: Cambridge Investment Research Advisors, Inc. and Cambridge Investment Research, Inc.

== Investments ==
The company's top holdings as of 2025 were:

Number	Security	Number of shares	Percentage of portfolio
1.	Vanguard Index Funds	1,840,000	2.40%
2.	Apple Inc.	4,310,000	2.6912%
3.	NVIDIA Corporation	5,530,000	2.6590%
4.	Invesco QQQ Trust	570,000	0.3909%
