= Liongate Capital Management =

- Company type: Private company
- Industry: Financial services
- Founded: 2003
- Founders: Randall Dillard, Jeff Holland and Ben Funk
- Defunct: 2015
- Fate: Liongate was rolled into Principal Global Investors’ (a subsidiary of Principal Finance Group, NYSE ticker: PFG) broader business.
- Headquarters: London, United Kingdom
- Key people: Randall Dillard, Jeff Holland and Ben Funk
- Products: Investment products, fund management, investment funds
- Website: www.liongatecapital.com

Liongate Capital Management was a global investment management firm, focused on creating and managing fund of hedge fund investments for institutional and private investors. Liongate was founded in 2003 by Randall Dillard, Jeff Holland and Ben Funk, and was closed in 2015. Prior to its closure it managed a range of funds of hedge funds, and some bespoke multi-strategy funds, in both commingled funds and tailored, single client portfolios.

== History ==
The firm, which at it peak managed over USD 3 billion with an additional USD 4 billion in assets under advisory, had a global reach with offices in London, New York, Zurich, Dubai, Malta and Mumbai. The Liongate partners sold the firm to Principal Financial Group in 2013 as the large US insurer and asset manager wanted a hedge fund research platform in order to quickly ramp up retail hedge fund distribution in the US. During the 2008 financial crisis, when the majority of hedge fund's had large draw downs and gated its investor base caught out having invested in far too many illiquid strategies, the Liongate Multi-Strategy Fund performed well and had sufficient liquidity to allow its investors to withdraw funds.

The firm’s flagship Liongate Multi-Strategy Fund, launched in April 2004, was a diversified fund of hedge funds that aimed to deliver a consistent annual return to investors within a targeted annualised standard deviation of 4-6%. The Liongate Commodities Fund was launched in January 2008. Randall Dillard was the lead portfolio manager of the funds and the firm's Chief Investment Officer.

The firm and its people won a number of industry awards. In 2009, the flagship fund was awarded Best Multi-Strategy Fund of Hedge Funds by Institutional Investor. The flagship fund was also named Best Diversified Fund of Hedge Funds by Hedgeweek. Financial News named Jeff Holland one of the top 40 Under 40 in hedge funds. Jeff Holland was named a Rising Star of Hedge Funds by Institutional Investor.

Liongate Capital Management was authorized and regulated by the Financial Services Authority (FSA) in the UK and was a registered investment advisor with the Securities and Exchange Commission (SEC) in the US.

In 2013, Principal Financial Group acquired 55% of Liongate in 2013 to expand in hedge funds and meet demand for alternative investments. By the time Principal purchased Liongate, assets under management had declined from its peak of USD 3 billion to USD 1.4 billion.

As investors increasingly began to favour direct allocations to hedge funds rather than investing in funds of hedge funds, investors continued to withdraw from funds of hedge funds or demand lower fees to reduce total fees. PFG transferred the firm's team, proprietary systems and offices in house to focus solely on the US retail market. Jeff Holland and Randall Dillard retired from Liongate in 2015, shortly after Ben Funk had left the firm, and PFG returned remaining assets to institutional investors and closed Liongate as a standalone business.

== See also ==
- Hedge fund
- Fund of hedge funds
