= Victory Capital =

American asset management company

Victory Capital Holdings, Inc
- Formerly: Key Asset Management
- Company type: Public
- Traded as: Nasdaq: VCTR; S&P 600 component
- Industry: Financial services
- Predecessor: Cleveland Trust
- Founded: 1894; 132 years ago
- Headquarters: San Antonio, Texas, United States
- Key people: David Brown (chairman and CEO); Michael Policarpo (president)
- Products: Mutual funds; Exchange-traded funds; Separately managed account; 529 plan; Individual retirement account
- Services: Investment management; Broker-dealer; Fund administration
- Revenue: ▼US$854.80 million (2022)
- Operating income: ▲US$399.11 million (2022)
- Net income: ▼US$275.51 million (2022)
- AUM: US$163.6 billion (April 2024)
- Total assets: ▼US$2.54 billion (2022)
- Total equity: ▲US$1.07 million (2022)
- Number of employees: ▲512 (2022)
- Website: www.vcm.com

Victory Capital Holdings, Inc. is an American financial services company headquartered in San Antonio, Texas that focuses on investment management. Outside the US, it also has investment professionals in London, Hong Kong and Singapore.

== History ==
The origins of Victory Capital are traced back to Cleveland Trust, a bank that was established in 1894 in Cleveland, Ohio with $500,000 in capital. In 1903, it merged with the Western Reserve Trust Company.

In the early 1970, it formed a holding company for itself named CleveTrust which was not subject to the same limitations of individual banks and was able establish to affiliates throughout the state. By 1977, the trust company of it managed $7 billion in trust funds for its client. In 1979, CleveTrust was renamed to AmeriTrust Corporation and in 1983, it changed to a national charter allowing it to expand outside the state of Ohio.

In the 1980s, AmeriTrust Corporation was weakened by the real estate market collapse and in September 1991, was acquired by Society Corporation.

In 1993, the trust company under Society Corporation was established as its own registered investment adviser under the name Society Asset Management.

In March 1994, Society Corporation merged with Keycorp and Society Asset Management was renamed to Key Asset Management. Gradison McDonald Investments and Spears, Benzak, Salomon & Farrell, both investment firms also acquired by KeyCorp were subsidiaries of Key Asset Management. William G. Spears was the chairman and CEO of Key Asset management from 1996 to 1999. In 1999, Key Asset Management had managed $72 billion in total assets.

In 2001, Key Asset Management was renamed to Victory Capital. Its subsidiaries Gradison McDonald and Spears, Benzak, Salomon & Farrell also took the Victory Capital brand name although their operations would remain independent.

In February 2013, Victory Capital partnered with Crestview Partners to complete a management buyout from KeyCorp for $246 million to become an independent firm. The sale included its broker-dealer affiliate, Victory Capital Advisers. At the time it had $22 billion in assets under management.

In October 2014, Victory Capital acquired Munder Capital Management and its subsidiary Integrity Asset Management.

In May 2015, Victory Capital completed its acquisition of Compass EMP and started offering exchange-traded funds (ETFs).

In July 2016, Victory Capital acquired RS investments from The Guardian Life Insurance Company of America and its emerging markets team was rebranded as Sophus Capital.

In January 2017, Victory Capital rebranded its Compass EMP ETF business as VictoryShares.

On February 8, 2018, Victory Capital held its initial public offering and became a listed company on the Nasdaq with an offering price at $13 per share.

In November 2018, Victory Capital announced it would acquire USAA Asset Management Company for $850 million. As a result, in January 2019, Victory Capital announced it would move its headquarters from Cleveland, Ohio to San Antonio, Texas. Both actions were completed in 2019.

In 2021, Victory Capital made a series of acquisitions where it acquired THB Asset Management, New Energy Capital Partners and WestEnd Advisors.

In 2023, the company rebranded USAA Investments as Victory Income Investors.

In April 2024, Victory Capital agreed to acquire the U.S. business of global asset manager Amundi. The business manages $104 billion in assets and has 480 employees. In exchange, Amundi would receive a 26.1% stake in Victory and access to its U.S. products and clientele.
