= NBK Capital =

Financial services company

Watani Investment Company (NBK Capital)(now known as NBK Wealth)
- Native name: شركة الوطني للاستثمار
- Company type: Private; Joint stock
- Industry: Investment Banking
- Founded: Kuwait City, Kuwait (2005)
- Founders: Consortium of Kuwaiti merchants
- Area served: Kuwait, Dubai, Istanbul, Cairo
- AUM: ▲US$8.9 billion (2023)
- Number of employees: over 150
- Parent: National Bank of Kuwait
- Website: nbkcapital.com

Watani Investment Company (NBK Capital) is a financial services firm with operations across the Middle East. NBK Capital was established in July 2005 as a fully owned subsidiary of the National Bank of Kuwait (NBK), the largest Kuwaiti bank and the highest rated in the Middle East.

NBK Capital focuses on four principal lines of business: Alternative Investments, Asset Management, Brokerage and Investment Banking.

NBK Capital operates regionally in Kuwait, Dubai, Egypt and Turkey with over 170 investment professionals.

NBK Capital’s Investment Banking group sells advisory services (whether debt, equity or M&A advisory) to clients across sectors.

The Alternative Investments group at NBK Capital manages three funds under its two main divisions –

• Private Equity – NBK Capital Equity Partners Fund, a $250 million regional private equity fund and the Kuwait Investment Opportunities Fund, a Kuwaiti $120 million private equity fund launched in 2008.

• Mezzanine – NBK Capital - GSC Group Mezzanine Fund, a $200 million mezzanine fund

The Asset Management group manages 49 investment funds with assets under management exceeding $10.2 billion. The funds are diversified across asset classes and include Money Markets, Equities, Islamic, Alternative Investments, and Real Estate.

The Brokerage group at NBK Capital provides a full brokerage service which offers online, institutional, and personal brokerage services. This comes hand in hand with the published research, in which NBK Capital aims to provide objective fundamental research on Middle East and North Africa (MENA) capital markets.

In April 2015, NBK Capital acted as joint lead manager in the launching of a $700 million bond by the National Bank of Kuwait.
