= Acadian Asset Management =

Asset management firm based in Boston

Acadian Asset Management Inc.
- Company type: Public
- Traded as: NYSE: AAMI; S&P 600 component
- Industry: Investment Management
- Predecessor: Acadian Financial Research
- Founded: 1986; 40 years ago
- Founders: Gary Bergstrom; John Chisholm; Churchill Franklin; Ron Frashure
- Headquarters: 260 Franklin Street, Boston, Massachusetts, U.S.
- Key people: Kelly Young (CEO)
- AUM: US$120 billion (September 2024)
- Number of employees: 330 (March 2023)
- Website: www.acadian-asset.com

Acadian Asset Management (or simply Acadian) is an American investment management company headquartered in Boston with additional offices in London, Singapore and Sydney. The company is noted for its usage of Quantitative analysis and strategies when making investment decisions.

== Background ==
The company's predecessor, Acadian Financial Research, was founded in 1977 by Gary Bergstrom. It managed investment strategies for the State Street Corporation. In 1986, Acadian Asset Management was founded by Bergstrom, John Chisholm, Churchill Franklin, Ron Frashure to manage assets independently. The company's name comes from the region, Acadia.

Acadian is an active manager and relies on fields such as artificial intelligence and data science to supplement its decision making process.

In 1992, Acadian was acquired by United Asset Management. In 2000, Acadian became a subsidiary of Old Mutual Asset Management (OMAN) after Old Mutual acquired United Asset Management.

In 2009, Acadian laid off 8% of its workforce due to volatile market conditions related to the 2008 financial crisis.

On October 15, 2014, OMAN held an initial public offering on the New York Stock Exchange.

In March 2017, Acadian partnered with Microsoft to use its Bing predicts big data technology to support its investment decision making process. However only several months later, it ended its partnership stating it had not found a way to turn social media data into useful signals for investments.

In 2018, the direct parent of Acadian, Old Mutual Asset Management separated from Old Mutual and was rebranded to BrightSphere Investment Group.

On January 1, 2025, BrightSphere Investment Group rebranded to Acadian Asset Management Inc.
