= The Guardian Life Insurance Company of America =

American mutual life insurance company

- Type: Mutual
- Industry: Insurance: Life & Health
- Founded: 1860; 166 years ago
- Headquarters: New York, NY 10001; U.S.
- Key people: Andrew McMahon (chairman and CEO)
- Number of employees: 8,000 employees 3,000 financial reps
- Subsidiaries: Berkshire Life Insurance Company of America The Guardian Insurance & Annuity Company, Inc. (GIAC); The Guardian Life Insurance Company of America Park Avenue Wealth Management (previously Park Avenue Securities)
- Website: www.guardianlife.com, www.guardiananytime.com

The Guardian Life Insurance Company of America is an American insurance company and one of the largest mutual life insurance companies in the world. Based in Manhattan, it has approximately 8,000 employees in the United States, and a network of over 3,000 financial representatives in more than 70 agencies nationwide. Founded in Manhattan in 1860, the company offers life insurance, disability income insurance, annuities, investments, and dental and vision insurance coverage. In 2026, Guardian reported its largest dividend payout to date at $1.7 billion.

== History ==
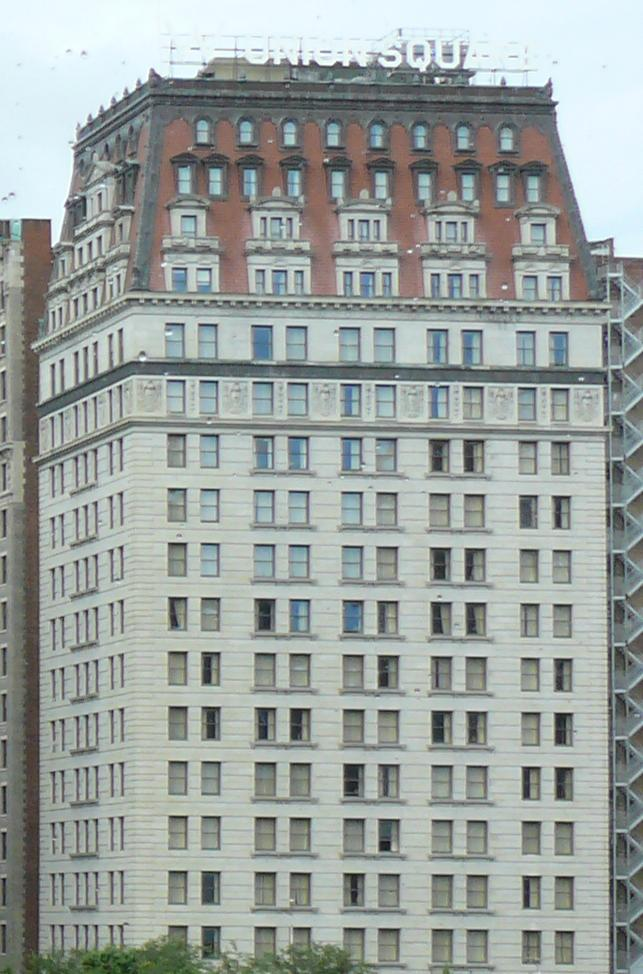
The former Germania/Guardian Life Insurance Building in Union Square, Manhattan

Guardian founder Hugo Wesendonck, a German civil rights lawyer, participated in the 1848-49 revolution and helped draft a constitution for a united Germany. Accused of treason, he fled post-revolution Europe and landed in the U.S. With start-up funds from fellow German refugees, he opened Germania Life Insurance Company in 1860 on Wall Street in Manhattan, to cover the growing number of German immigrants arriving on American shores. Two years later, he opened a branch in San Francisco, and later across the country, reaching territories such as Colorado, New Mexico, North Dakota, and South Dakota.

As operations expanded, the company moved to the Germania Life Insurance Company Building at Union Square in 1911 – a location that would serve as Guardian's headquarters for more than 85 years.

In 1868, Germania had become the first U.S. insurance company to start an agency in Europe. By the early 20th century, almost half its business was outside North America, until the pressures of World War I forced it to stop its business in Europe. In 1918, in response to Anti-German sentiment in the United States, the company changed its name to The Guardian Life Insurance Company of America. In 1925, Guardian became a mutual insurance company, which means that its policyholders are its owners.

In 1979, Guardian began to regionalize many Home Office functions, and satellite offices are now located in Bethlehem, Pennsylvania; Appleton, Wisconsin; Spokane, Washington; and Norwell, Massachusetts. In 1999, Guardian relocated its headquarters to 7 Hanover Square in the Financial District. In April 2017 the company announced plans to move several hundred employees to Bell Labs in Holmdel, New Jersey. Two years later, Guardian moved its headquarters to Hudson Yards.

== Products ==
Guardian Life Insurance’s products include life and disability insurance, dental, group benefits, retirement, and wealth management services.

=== Dental ===
Guardian is the 6th largest dental provider in the US, with 6.4 million participants as of February 2015. Guardian acquired First Commonwealth in 1999, and acquired Premier Access in 2014, and Avesis in 2016.

=== Disability insurance ===
In July 2001, Guardian merged with Berkshire Life Insurance Company. As of February 2015, the newly formed Berkshire Life Insurance Company of America subsidiary administers all disability products for Guardian.

=== Human resources ===
Guardian acquired Reed Group in 2012 and through it, provides human resources to companies dealing with employees on absence due to disability. It helps manage and administer claims related to employee absences, offers "LeavePro", a software to manage absences, and offers "MDGuidelines", a web-based tool to manage employee's return to work. In 2015, they grew this business by acquiring Aon Hewitt's absence management business.

=== Investment services ===
In 2006, Guardian acquired 65% of RS Investments. RS provides its services to pensions, investment companies, high net worth individuals, corporations, and banks. It also has a selection of mutual funds which it offers to clients. In 2007, RS Investments was one of the largest stockholders in Corrections Corporation of America, with 2,486,866 shares. In 2016, Victory Capital acquired RS Investments.

In September 2016, Guardian sold their 401(k) business to Ameritas Life.

Additionally, Guardian owns a full service broker-dealer Park Avenue Securities (PAS). PAS was established in 1999 by Guardian.

== Controversies ==
In 2009, Guardian was the subject of controversy when, in December 2008, it cancelled the insurance plan that covered Ian Pearl, who has muscular dystrophy and requires 24-hour nursing care, which costs approximately million dollars a year. Under the federal ERISA law Guardian was obligated to continue the coverage for one year after it cancelled the plan and thus policy under the plan. Guardian offered no comparable plan to replace it, and his parents characterized the cancellation as a "death sentence." His parents sued Guardian and lost the case in October 2009, when a federal judge found that Guardian had the right to terminate the entire plan. The Pearl family appealed to the Secretary of Health and Human Services and to the media, and publicized a memo that emerged during the trial, which characterized high cost policies like the one Pearl had, as "dogs" and "trainwrecks." Guardian publicly and personally apologized to the Pearls and agreed to continue coverage for Ian and two other patients in similar situations. Ian Pearl lives in New York State, and as a result of the controversy, New York passed "Ian's Law" that among other things, requires that insurance companies that cancel insurance plans must offer similar replacement coverage to policy holders under the cancelled plan.
