= Coronation Fund Managers =

South African fund management company

- Type: Public
- Traded as: JSE: CML
- ISIN: ZAE000047353
- Founded: 1993; 33 years ago
- Headquarters: Cape Town, South Africa
- Area served: Worldwide
- Key people: Anton Pillay (CEO); Karl Leinberger (CIO)
- Products: Unit Trust Funds; Tax-free investments Retirement annuities Institutional fund management Offshore investment
- Services: Asset management Fund management
- AUM: R761 billion (2025)
- Website: coronation.com

Coronation Fund Managers, often referred to simply as Coronation, is a South African independent asset management company headquartered in Cape Town. The firm manages capital for institutional and retail investors, utilizing a long-term, valuation-driven investment philosophy.

Coronation operates across major South African metropolitan areas and maintains an international presence through offices in Ireland and the United Kingdom, as well as a joint venture with Namibia Asset Management in Namibia. It is listed on the JSE Limited.

== History ==
Coronation Fund Managers commenced operations in Cape Town in 1993, as an independent asset management company operating without tied distribution channels. Since its establishment, the firm has grown its asset base organically. International expansion began in the late 1990s, with the opening of an office in Dublin in 1998 and in London in 1999.

In June 2003, Coronation Fund Managers was listed on the Johannesburg Stock Exchange (JSE). That same year, it became the first South African asset manager to achieve compliance with the Global Investment Performance Standards (GIPS).

In 2008, Coronation launched two Africa portfolios.

== Operations ==
Coronation operates across South Africa, the United Kingdom, and Ireland, and maintains a strategic partnership with Namibia Asset Management. Its client base includes pension funds, medical schemes, family offices, and individual investors.

The firm offers funds across various asset classes, including multi-asset, equity, fixed income, and hedge funds. It cover developed and emerging markets, as well as specific African mandates.

== Regulation and stewardship ==
Coronation is regulated by the Financial Sector Conduct Authority (FSCA) in South Africa. Its international operations fall under the supervision of the Financial Conduct Authority (FCA) in the United Kingdom, the Central Bank of Ireland, and the U.S. Securities and Exchange Commission (SEC).

The firm became a signatory to the United Nations Principles of Responsible Investments in 2007 and adopted the Code for Responsible Investing in South Africa in 2012. In 2019, Coronation joined the Climate Action 100+ initiative, followed by the adoption of the Task Force on Climate-related Financial Disclosures (TCFD) framework in 2020.

== Transformation ==
Coronation has participated in several initiatives aimed at economic transformation within the Southern African financial services sector. These include the launch of Namibia Asset Management (1996), the funding of African Harvest Asset Management (1999), and the establishment of Kagiso Asset Management (now Camissa Asset Management) in 2001. In 2018, the firm partnered in the launch of Intembeko Investment Administration.

In 2005, Coronation established the Imvula Trust to facilitate direct black ownership. In November 2024, shareholders approved a Broad-Based Black Economic Empowerment (B-BBEE) transaction that increased the company's effective black ownership to 52% as measured by the Financial Sector Code. This transaction was named the Exxaro BEE Deal of the Year by DealMakers in 2024. The firm has maintained a Level 1 B-BBEE contributor status since 2021.
