= RhumbLine Advisers =

Asset management firm based in Boston

RhumbLine Advisers LP
- Type: Private
- Industry: Investment Management
- Founded: 1990; 36 years ago
- Founder: John D. Nelson
- Headquarters: Boston, Massachusetts, United States
- Key people: Denise D'Entremont (CEO)
- AUM: US$136.5 billion (December 2025)
- Number of employees: 30 (March 2024)
- Website: www.rhumblineadvisers.com

RhumbLine Advisers (RhumbLine) is an American investment management firm based in Boston. The firm specializes in passive management index-based strategies for institutional investors.

== History ==
RhumbLine was founded in 1990 by African-American John D. Nelson. An avid sailor who had served in the United States Navy, Nelson settled on a nautical reference when creating the firm. Squeezing two words together, he called it RhumbLine, a term for navigating a direct course from point A to point B. Prior to this Nelson was senior vice president at State Street Corporation who helped establish its public funds division. He was also a former chief administrative and budget officer for the Democratic National Committee.

In 1991, Bing Sung joined RhumbLine from the Harvard University endowment and would become its chief investment officer.

In 1998, the U.S. Securities and Exchange Commission (SEC) sued Sung and RhumbLine for unauthorized trading and concealing the losses involved. It alleged that Sung cost a pension funds for the AT&T Corporation and Massachusetts teachers and state employees, $150 million and $12 million respectively in 1996 after he made huge unauthorized bets on technology stocks. The lawsuit came after a two-year investigation by the SEC when the fraud was first discovered in September 1996. RhumbLine had agreed to manage AT&T's options programs within the strict limits. But in early 1995, Sung began to exceed them. In late 1995, Sung secured waivers at the Chicago Board Options Exchange and the Philadelphia Stock Exchange by saying he was hedging $9 billion in stock holdings by AT&T. On several occasions, Sung gave false performance reports to AT&T, understating losses by millions. By September 1996, the positions grew so large that the options on the Nasdaq-100 index in AT&T's fund made up two-thirds of the entire market for those options.

Sung who had resigned in 1996 after the losses were discovered denied any wrongdoing. Rhumbline agreed to a censure, to improve its monitoring controls and to pay a $50,000 penalty fine. Nelson agreed to pay a $10,000 fine and a one year suspension. Nelson stated that RhumbLine no longer traded options and would focus on index funds. Ronald Golz who had been with RhumbLine since its founding took over the firm for a year. The firm then held meeting with clients who were concerned by the incident. In August 1999, Sung agreed to pay a $50,000 fine and to be barred from the investment advisory industry.

On June 30, 2013, RhumbLine founder Nelson died of complications from Alzheimer's disease.

In March 2017, it was reported RhumbLine had several mandates from pension funds in recent months due to the continued popularity of passive management as well as the firm's range of smart beta, ESG and infrastructure offerings.

In August 2021, it was reported that the Massachusetts Pension Reserves Investment Management (PRIM) recommended that the fund approve an initial allocation of up to $1 billion for RhumbLine's Passive S&P 500 Index. It was done to reduce the concentration of assets managed by State Street Global Advisors. PRIM staff members described RhumbLine as a diverse, female and minority-owned firm which fell under the FUTURE Initiative to increase Diversity, equity, and inclusion.

== Investment strategy ==
RhumbLine has stated it uses three strategies to construct portfolios: replication, sampling, and optimization. The investment process is quantitative and model-driven with the portfolios being reviewed daily by automated reports.
