= Cambridge Associates =

Privately held investment firm based in the United States

Cambridge Associates LLC
- Type: Private
- Industry: Financial services
- Founded: 1973; 53 years ago
- Founders: Hunter Lewis, James Bailey
- Headquarters: Boston, Massachusetts, U.S.
- Key people: David Druley (CEO)
- Products: Asset management, investment management
- AUM: US$276 billion (September 2024)
- Total assets: US$86 billion (December 2023)
- Number of employees: 1,387
- Website: cambridgeassociates.com

Cambridge Associates LLC is a privately held investment firm based in the United States. It provides investment portfolio management and advisory services to institutional investors, including foundations and endowments, pensions, private clients, and corporate and government entities.

== History ==
Cambridge Associates was founded by Harvard College roommates Hunter Lewis and James Bailey in 1973.

The firm initially provided investment research to endowments and foundations, and over time, it expanded its services to investment consulting and portfolio management for many institutional investors, such as endowments, foundations and pensions. Cambridge Associates’ CEO, David Druley, was appointed in 2016 after having been head of global investments. He succeeded Sandra A. Urie, who was chairman and CEO for 16 years.

On February 3, 2022, it was announced that Cambridge Associates will be taking 115,000 square feet in the Winthrop Center tower for its new headquarters later in the year.

== Business ==
Cambridge Associates has, as of 2025 year-end, $616 billion in assets under advisement, of which roughly $86 billion is managed for client on a discretionary basis—almost tripled from $30 billion in 2018. The firm has moved further into the business of investing on behalf of clients in addition to its traditional business of largely recommending investment managers to institutions and wealthy individuals and families.

The institutions that outsource the management of their investment portfolio to Cambridge Associates include the American Red Cross, for its pension and endowment; the University of Louisiana at Lafayette Foundation, and the endowment of Lewis & Clark College.

The Wall Street Journal, Bloomberg and Reuters utilize Cambridge Associates research.

In 2017, the firm laid off 3% of its workforce in the investment staff, performance reporting and data collection areas in order to more closely focus on its portfolio management operations.

== Investment services ==
It offers investment consulting, outsourced portfolio solutions, research services and tools, and performance monitoring across various asset classes. The company also provides services in areas, such as investment objectives, asset allocation, investment management structures and guidelines, investment manager selection and evaluation, and performance monitoring.
