= Allan Gray (company) =

South African investment management firm

- Type: Private
- Founded: 1973; 53 years ago
- Founder: Allan W.B. Gray
- Headquarters: Cape Town, South Africa
- Area served: Southern Africa
- Key people: Ian Liddle (Chairman)
- Services: Asset management
- AUM: R322.5 billion (31 December 2021)
- Owner: The Allan & Gill Gray Foundation (Controlling interest)
- Website: allangray.co.za

Allan Gray, officially Allan Gray Proprietary Limited, is a South African investment management firm, headquartered in Cape Town. The company was founded in 1973, and operates in numerous Southern African countries.

The company offers a range of investment products, including tax-free savings accounts, unit trusts, group savings plans for employers, actively-managed ETFs, retirement annuities, preservation funds, living annuities, endowment policies, and segregated portfolios for institutional investors.

== History ==
Allan Gray Investment Counsel was established in October 1973 by Allan W.B. Gray, securing its first client the following year.

In 1989, in order to expand its global investment capabilities, the company's founder established Orbis Investment Management.

In 1992, the company rebranded to Allan Gray Limited.

In 1996, Allan Gray opened its first office outside of SA, located in Windhoek, Namibia. This was followed by an office in Gaborone, Botswana, in 2004.

== Corporate social responsibility ==
Allan Gray participates in social investments primarily through the Allan Gray Orbis Foundation and E Squared, which are dedicated to the education and financial support of emerging entrepreneurs. The foundation receives an annual donation calculated as 5% of the pre-tax profits from Allan Gray, along with a $150 million endowment from the company's founder.

Additionally, E Squared holds a 20% stake in Allan Gray Limited, a structure intended to allocate resources towards entrepreneurial development and education.
