= De Kock =

De Kock is a Dutch occupational surname meaning "the cook".

The surname may refer to:

- Arthur de Kock (1866–1957), South African rugby player
- Charles Paul de Kock (1793–1871), French novelist
- Eugene de Kock (born 1949), South African police colonel and assassin
- Frits de Kock (1818–1881), Dutch government minister, son of Hendrik Merkus
- Gerald de Kock, South African cricket commentator
- Gerhard de Kock (1926–1989), Governor of the South African Reserve Bank, son of Mike de Kock
- Gert De Kock (born 1980), South African rugby player
- Hendrik Merkus de Kock (1779–1845), Dutch general, minister, and governor of the Dutch East Indies
  - Fort de Kock on Sumatra was named after him
- Henry de Kock (1819–1892), French playwright, novelist, and chansonnier, son of Charles Pal
- Jean Conrad de Kock (1755–1794), Dutch banker executed in France, father of Hendrik Merkus and Charles Paul
- Johan de Kock (born 1964), Dutch footballer
- Kobus de Kock (born 1988), South African rugby player
- Lucas Cornelisz de Kock (1495–1552), Dutch Renaissance painter active in the Tudor court
- Meyer de Kock (1849–1901), South African Republic burgher executed for treason
- Michiel de Kock Steenkamp (born 1987), South African rugby player
- Michiel Hendrik de Kock (1898–1976), Governor of the South African Reserve Bank
- Neil de Kock (born 1978), South African rugby player
- Paul de Kock (1793–1871), French novelist
- Peter de Kock (born 1967), Dutch cameraman, film producer and director.
- Quinton de Kock (born 1992), South African cricketer
- Riel de Kock (born 1983), South African cricketer
- Véronique De Kock (born 1977), Belgian beauty pageant contestant

== See also ==
- De Cock
- De Kok
