= COVID-19 pandemic in South Africa =

- Confirmed active COVID-19 cases in provinces from March 2020 to July 2022.

- Natural excess deaths (green) up to 2022-12-10 vs confirmed COVID-19 deaths (red) up to 2022-07-02.
- Disease: COVID-19
- Pathogen: SARS-CoV-2
- Location: South Africa
- First outbreak: Wuhan, Hubei, China
- Index case: Hilton, KwaZulu-Natal
- Arrival date: 5 March 2020 (6 years, 8 months, 2 weeks and 2 days ago)
- Confirmed cases: 4,073,188 +1,358 as of 1 February 2022
- Active cases: 6,118
- Recovered: 3,946,943
- Deaths: 102,595 +0 as of 1 February 2023
- Fatality rate: 2.52%
- Test positivity rate: 12.7% as of 25 March 2023
- Vaccinations: 24,210,952 (total vaccinated); 21,038,796 (fully vaccinated); 41,798,812 (doses administered)

Government website
- https://sacoronavirus.co.za https://vaccine.enroll.health.gov.za

The COVID-19 pandemic in South Africa was part of the pandemic of coronavirus disease 2019 (COVID-19) caused by the severe acute respiratory syndrome coronavirus 2 (SARS-CoV-2).

On 5 March 2020, Minister of Health Zweli Mkhize had confirmed the spread of the virus to South Africa, with the first known patient being a male citizen who tested positive upon his return from Italy. On 15 March 2020, the President of South Africa, Cyril Ramaphosa, declared a national state of disaster, and announced measures such as immediate travel restrictions and the closure of schools from 18 March. On 17 March, the National Coronavirus Command Council was established, "to lead the nation's plan to contain the spread and mitigate the negative impact of the coronavirus". On 23 March, a national lockdown was announced, starting on 27 March 2020. The first local death from the disease was reported on 27 March 2020. On 21 April, a 500 billion rand stimulus was announced in response to the pandemic. Ramaphosa announced that from 1 May 2020, a gradual and phased easing of the lockdown restrictions would begin, lowering the national alert level to 4. From 1 June, the national restrictions were lowered to level 3. The restrictions were lowered to alert level 2 on 17 August 2020. From 21 September 2020, restrictions were lowered to alert level 1.

In December 2020, the country experienced a 2nd wave of COVID-19 infections, mostly with infections from the SARS-CoV-2 Beta variant. The lockdown was tightened from an adjusted level 1 to an adjusted level 3 starting on 29 December 2020. The lockdown was lowered from an adjusted level 3 to an adjusted level 1 starting on 1 March 2021. On 17 February 2021, the national COVID-19 vaccination program was officially rolled out.

On 8 May 2021, local cases of variants of concern Delta (first detected in India, which has a higher transmissibility than the dominant strain, Beta) and Alpha were reported. On 31 May 2021 the country was moved from adjusted level 1 to an adjusted alert level 2, due to a 3rd wave of infections, mostly with infections from the Delta variant. On 15 June 2021 the country was moved to alert level 3. On 28 June 2021, the country was moved to adjusted level 4, with the Delta variant fast becoming the dominant strain in the country. On 9 July 2021, sixteen months into the pandemic, doctors in Johannesburg described the system there as beyond its breaking point, with insufficient beds and barely enough oxygen. On 25 July 2021 the country was lowered to adjusted level 3. On 13 September 2021, an adjusted alert level 2 took effect, and on 1 October 2021 more restrictions were eased by moving to adjusted alert level 1.

On 26 November 2021, the World Health Organization (WHO) classified the Omicron variant, first identified in Botswana but first reported to the WHO by South Africa, as a variant of concern. Several countries announced travel bans from South Africa and its neighboring countries. The country was entering its 4th wave by 1 December 2021, mostly with infections from the standard BA.1 subvariant of the Omicron variant. On 4 February 2022 it was announced that South African scientists had replicated the Moderna COVID-19 vaccine. Further easing of restrictions came into effect on 23 March 2022, including dropping the requirement to wear masks outdoors though still required indoors in public vehicles and spaces, allowing proof of vaccination or a COVID-19 test not older than 72 hours as an alternative for entering certain venues, and reducing distancing to 1 metre except in schools. On midnight 4 April 2022, the National State of Disaster was terminated, though some transitional provisions remained in place for a period of 30 days.

A limited 5th wave from late-April 2022 was mostly from infections from the BA.4, BA.5, and BA.2 subvariants of the Omicron variant. Deaths were more decoupled from cases, likely due to high levels of population immunity from infection and/or vaccination. Eminent risk declined by mid-June 2022, and on 22 June 2022 all remaining health regulations regarding COVID-19 were ended.

During the first two years, 2020 and 2021, excess deaths were estimated at 292.3 per 100000 population. As of 2 January 2023 there have been 341123 excess deaths of persons older than 1 years from natural causes since 3 May 2020, with 85%–95% of these excess deaths attributable to COVID-19, and the remaining 5%–15% probably mainly due to overwhelmed health services. In May 2023, it was announced by the WHO Director-General that COVID-19 was no longer a Public health emergency of international concern.

== Timeline ==
Since the first patient with COVID-19 was confirmed in South Africa on 3 March 2020 the country has experienced five waves of the pandemic.

== Preparations and response ==
After the World Health Organization (WHO) declared COVID-19 a Public health emergency of international concern on 30 January 2020, an emergency operation centre was immediately activated.

=== Testing ===
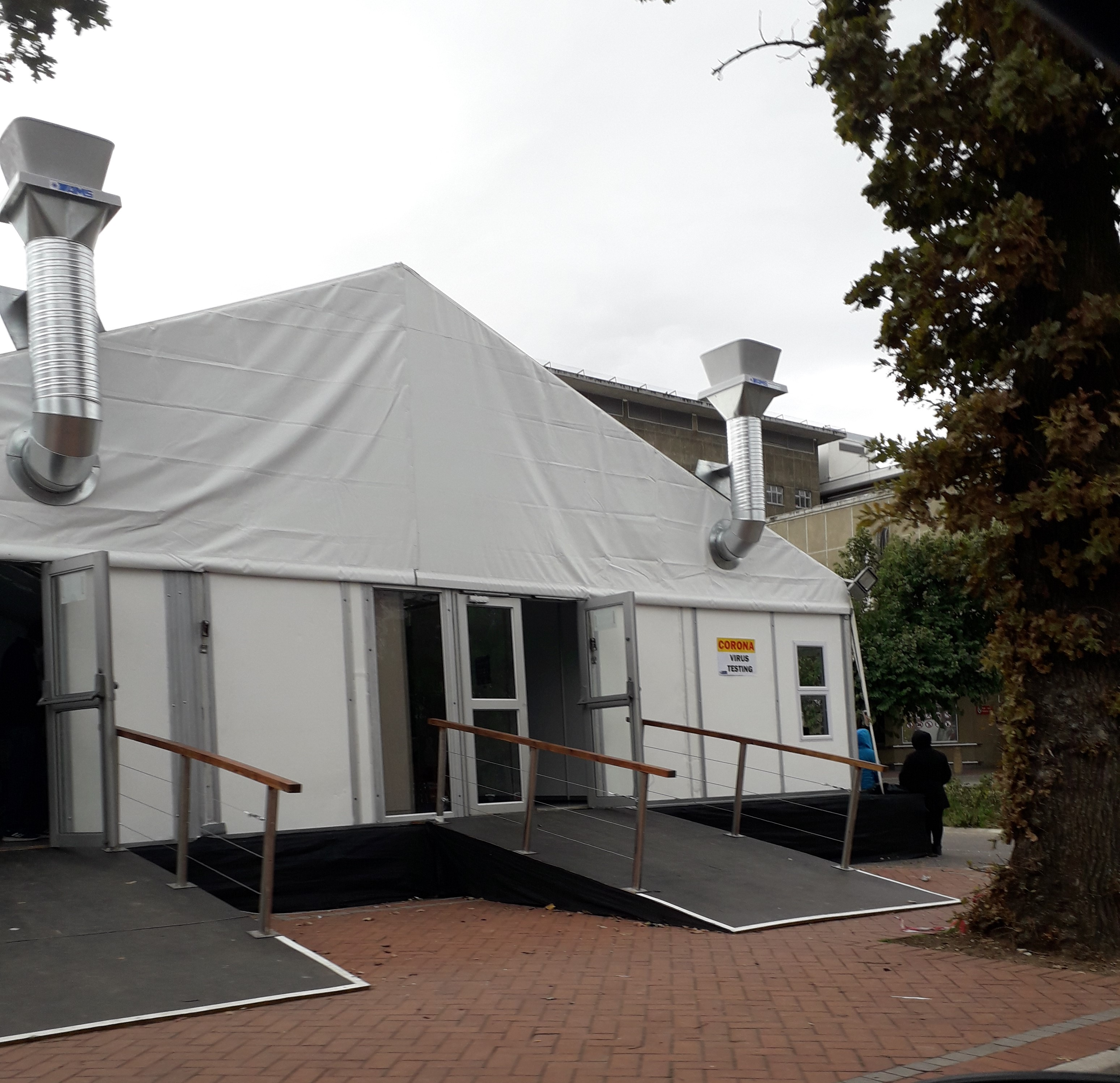
A COVID-19 testing tent at the Paarl Provincial Hospital

The National Institute for Communicable Diseases (NICD) started testing people in South Africa for SARS-CoV-2 on 28 January 2020, and by 7 February had conducted 42 such tests.

By mid-March, state hospitals were offering free COVID-19 testing.

On 30 March 2020, the government announced its intentions of initiating an enhanced screening and testing programme. On 3 April 2020, the NICD made alterations to its testing guidelines to further allow for anyone who presented with relevant COVID-19 symptoms to be tested (previously there were additional requirements such as history of foreign travel or recent contact with a confirmed case). By the start of April, 67 mobile testing units had been established and 47000 people had been tested, some in drive-through facilities.

On 8 April, the National Health Laboratory Service (NHLS) detailed its testing capacity through the country. The NHLS would be able to perform approximately 36000 tests per day.

Many private clinical pathology laboratories were also conducting tests. The CEO of the NHLS, Dr Kamy Chetty, said that by 9 April 2020 the majority of tests had been done in the private sector as the initial cases had been linked to international travellers who were likely to be on private medical aids.

By 9 April 2020, South Africa had conducted 68874 tests at 1.2 tests per thousand, considerably lower than for example Turkey (3.3), the United Kingdom (3.6), and South Korea (9.7). However, the ratio of positive tests to total tests conducted was significantly lower than most countries. By 10 April, the number of tests had increased to 73028, making the average number of tests per day in the first 10 days of April roughly 3300. The chair of the board of the NHLS, Eric Buch, stated that it had a capacity of 15000 tests per day and would welcome doing more tests.

On 14 April, Stavros Nicolaou, head of Business for South Africa's healthcare working group and Aspen Pharmacare executive, said that South Africa had the capacity and kits to do 25000 tests a day.

By 23 April the total number of tests was 143570. The number of daily tests increased: for the first 14 days of April the daily average number of tests was 3394; for the next 9 days the daily average was 6283. The rate of positive tests versus total tests remained less than 3%. The Minister of Health released figures that showed that of all the tests done up to 23 April 62% had been done in the private sector and 38% in the public sector. However, that ratio was changing as the public sector increased capacity. The public sector performed 63% of the new tests reported on 23 April 2020.

By 27 April, 185497 tests had been performed on South African residents, with the public sector doing the majority of the tests. Provincial test coverage varied by over a factor of 8. The number of tests per 100000 residents (based on 2019 population estimates) was Northwest 66, Limpopo 69, Mpumalanga 101, Northern Cape 111, Eastern Cape 247, KwaZulu-Natal 270, Free State 284, Gauteng 439, and Western Cape 541 (national average 317). A surveillance programme was started to monitor community transmission (as opposed to tests done on people who displayed symptoms or who had been in contact with COVID-19 patients). In the three arms of the programme 812 tests had been done and two positive cases had been detected.

By 28 June, the total number of tests was 1567084. The private sector had now overtaken the public sector, in terms of tests completed. The private sector had done 804248 test with the public sector only doing 762836.

By 11 July, 2108570 had been done with the private sector still doing the most tests.

=== Genomic surveillance ===
South Africa had created a sizable genomic surveillance consortium by May 2020. Due to this, scientists from Southern Africa, led by Tulio de Oliveira, discovered and confirmed the COVID-19 virus's Beta variant in 2020 and its Omicron variant in November 2021.

=== Clinical trials, vaccines and treatment ===
On 17 March 2020, the South African Health Products Regulatory Authority announced that it would expedite review of treatments, vaccines and clinical trials.

A team from 8 universities and 14 hospitals led by Helen Rees and Jeremy Nel from the University of the Witwatersrand participated in the World Health Organization Solidarity Clinical Trials that investigated medications.

=== State of disaster ===
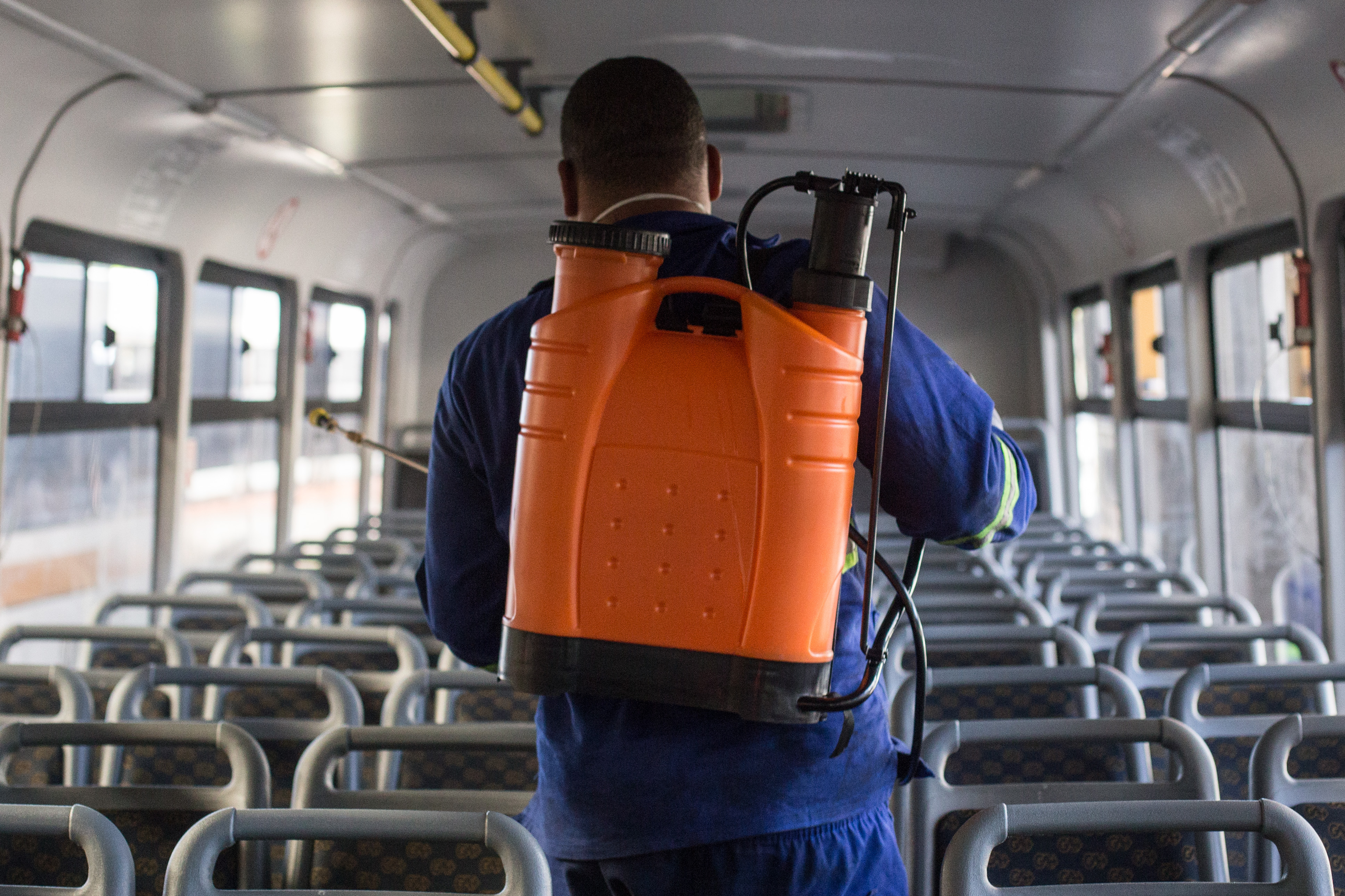
A Golden Arrow Bus Services bus being sanitised in March 2020

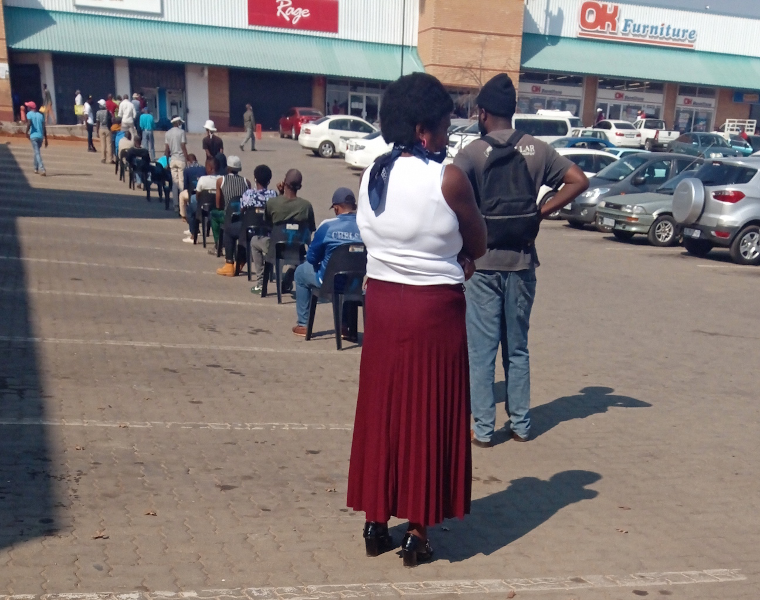
Shoppers practicing measures of social distancing whilst buying groceries in South Africa.

By mid-March, isolation measures gathered pace, and on 15 March 2020, President Cyril Ramaphosa declared a national state of disaster, prohibiting gatherings of more than 100 people.

On 17 March, Ramaphosa, supported by Deputy President David Mabuza, convened the inaugural meeting of the National Command Council on COVID-19, or as it was subsequently called, the National Coronavirus Command Council, "to lead the nation's plan to contain the spread and mitigate the negative impact of the coronavirus".

On 18 March, Minister of Cooperative Governance and Traditional Affairs Nkosazana Dlamini-Zuma signed a government gazette limiting the number of patrons at pubs, clubs, and restaurants to 50.

Parliament suspended all activities as of 18 March. and the African National Congress (ANC) and Democratic Alliance (DA) postponed their elective conferences. The Commission for Conciliation Mediation and Arbitration (CCMA) cancelled all scheduled cases from 18 March 2020 and prohibited walk-in referrals of new cases – in lieu of electronic referrals.

Schools were closed on 18 March 2020, resuming in early June. Most universities suspended classes around this time as well. University of Pretoria, University of Cape Town, Stellenbosch University, Rhodes University, University of KwaZulu-Natal and Durban University of Technology graduation ceremonies were cancelled or postponed until further notice.

After panic buying, some retailers put limitations on the number of certain items customers could buy. On 19 March, Minister of Trade and Industry Ebrahim Patel signed a government gazette that enforces price controls on essential items and that could see price gougers punished with measures including a R10 million fine, a fine equivalent to 10% of a firm's turnover, or 12 months in prison.

On 3 June, Minister Dlamini-Zuma extended the state of disaster, which was to lapse on 15 June, three months after its announcement, to 4 July citing "the need to continue augmenting the existing mitigation measures undertaken by organs of state to address the impact of the disaster." On midnight 4 April 2022, the National State of Disaster was terminated, though some transitional provisions remained in place for a period of 30 days.

==== Tobacco and alcohol ====
During the announcement on the lifting of level 5 lockdown measures on 23 April, Cyril Ramaphosa announced that the sale of tobacco would be permitted again, this statement was contradicted on 29 April by Minister Dlamini-Zuma. The resulting uncertainty over tobacco sales during level 4 lockdown caused British American Tobacco to file an urgent court appeal which was dropped on 6 May and reopened by 29 May. The ban raised concerns by the Human Sciences Research Council and South African Revenue Service that it would encourage the growth of illicit tobacco sales thereby growing the power and influence of organised crime. The ANC Women's League defended Dlamini-Zuma's statement amid accusations that she was receiving financial support from illicit tobacco traders. By 4 May, Ramaphosa confirmed the continuation of the ban during level 4. The Democratic Alliance accused Dlamini-Zuma of lying to the public over the strength of support for the tobacco ban and called for her removal from office. On 11 December The Western Cape High Court ruled that the tobacco sales ban was unconstitutional.

During the level 5 lockdown period, the sale of alcohol was banned; so as to reduce pressure from alcohol-related incidents putting additional pressure on hospitals. The ban was controversially reimposed on 12 July amid concerns that the ban was leading to the growth of illicit alcohol sales. Two years later the Supreme Court of Appeal found that there "was no scientific justification for the continued ban on the sale of tobacco products: there is no evidence that short-term quitting has clinical significance for Covid-19 severity and outcome."

==== Criticism ====
The uncertainties around the length of the lockdown, its intensity, and concerns over the erosion of civil liberties has drawn criticism from a number of notable individuals and political parties in South Africa. Former finance minister and senior ANC member Trevor Manuel questioned the rationality of the way in which government implemented the lockdown whilst expressing concern that the lockdown endangered the South African Constitution. The DA challenged the use of the military to enforce night curfews, criticised the ban on e-commerce and restrictions on exercise hours, and filed a court challenge over the constitutionality of the lack of parliamentary oversight in the National Disaster Management Act. The Freedom Front Plus filed an application to the Gauteng High Court challenging the constitutional validity of the National Disaster Management Act. The Economic Freedom Fighters criticised the relaxation of some of the May 2020 lockdown regulations as an example of giving into industry pressure by allowing them to reopen.

The number of passengers ferried per trip in minibus taxis was criticised during the lockdown restrictions, in July 2020. The Colleges of Medicine of South Africa stated that allowing minibus taxis to operate at 100 percent occupancy, for short journeys, was a possible danger to public health and contradicted some lockdown restrictions. Initially in the first stage of the lockdown period minibus taxis were required to operate at 70 percent occupancy, provided passengers wore masks and windows were opened. This 70% occupancy requirement was noted as being flouted by taxi operators.

=== Repatriation ===
On 14 March 2020, 112 South Africans were repatriated from Wuhan, China, and placed under observation and in quarantine at The Ranch Resort near Polokwane.

Medical screening was performed prior to departure, four South Africans who were showing signs of coronavirus were left behind to mitigate risk. Only South Africans who tested negative were repatriated.

Test results cleared all the South Africans, including the flight crew, pilots, hotel staff, police and soldiers involved in the humanitarian mission who, as a precautionary measure, all remained under observation and in quarantine for a 14-day period at The Ranch Resort.

=== Cuban doctors ===
On 27 April 217 Cuban medical health specialists (mostly doctors) arrived in South Africa to assist with the pandemic response at the invitation of the South African government and were deployed across the country.

Their arrival and the reported R429 million cost paid to the Cuban government was controversial. The South African Medical Association stated that their deployment was premature as many South African doctors and nurses had not yet been deployed as part of the pandemic response. The South African Internationally Trained Health Professionals Association criticised the government for not instead using unemployed South African medical graduates. The Democratic Alliance stated that government should first prioritise using local healthcare professionals. The Daily Maverick questioned the high cost paid for the doctors. The United States government criticised their deployment and payments made for their services as a form of human trafficking whilst the Cuban embassy rejected allegations of profiting from the deployment of its doctors and stated that criticism was part of a "smear campaign".

=== Donations ===
South Africa received donation of personal protective equipment like medical masks from China and ventilators from the United States.

On 5 August 2020, the World Health Organization (WHO) deployed a "surge team" made up of 43 experts including David Heymann, who headed the international response to the 2003 SARS epidemic, to help the national and provincial responses to minimize the spread and impact of COVID-19.

=== COVID AlertSA tracing app ===
On 8 August 2020, the department of health released a COVID-19 contact tracing app. The app aims to reduce infections in the second and third waves of Covid. the app is available on Google Play, the App Store and The Huawei App Gallery.

== Lockdown ==
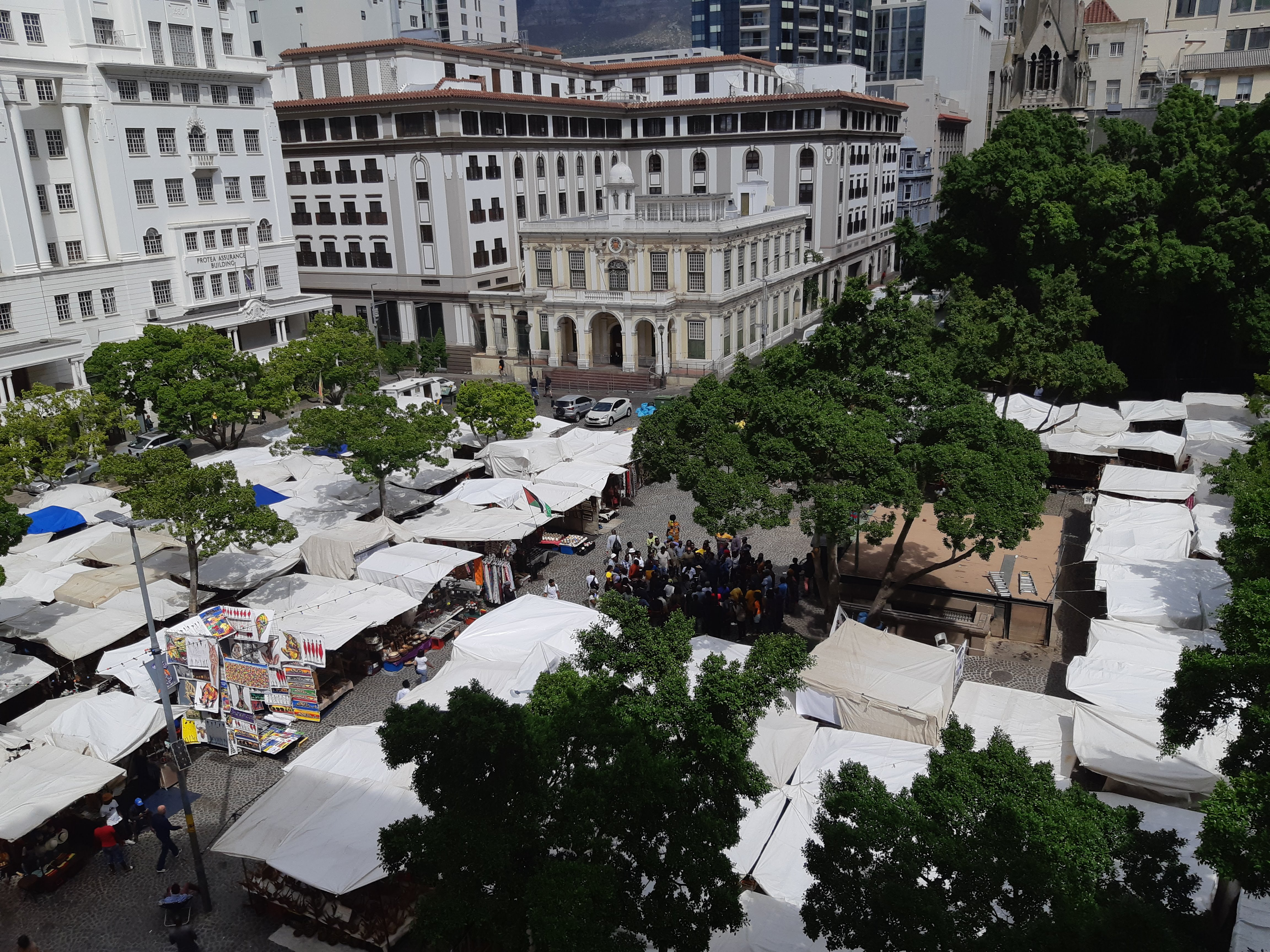
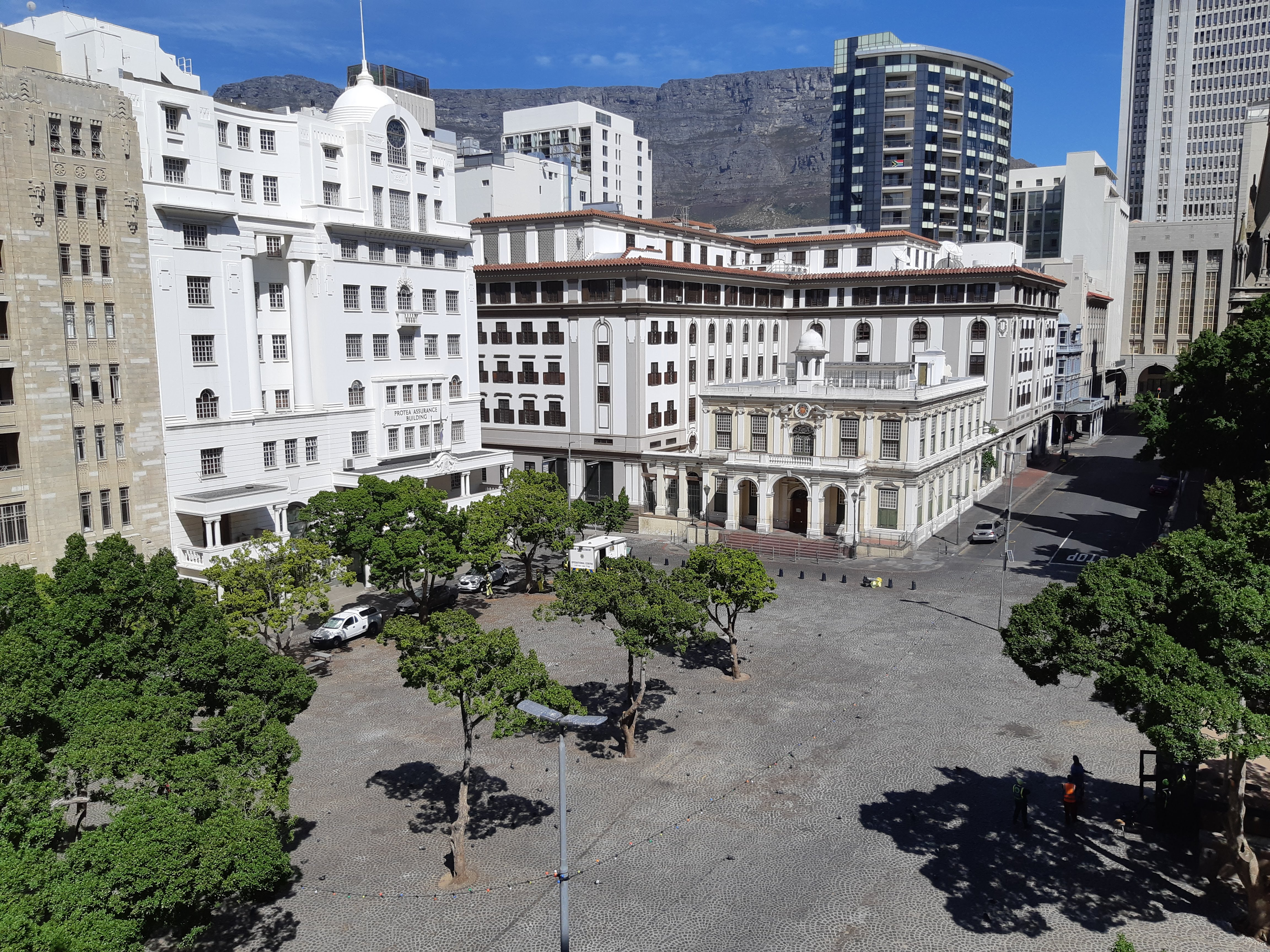
Greenmarket Square in Cape Town seven days before (left) and on the first day (right) of the COVID-19 national lockdown. After the lockdown the market stall traders that normally setup on the square everyday are not present and only people exempt from the lockdown (security personnel and municipal employees) can be seen.

On 23 March 2020, President Cyril Ramaphosa addressed the nation and announced a 21-day national lockdown effective from midnight 26 March through to 16 April, with the deployment of the South African National Defence Force (SANDF) to support the government. On 9 April the President announced a two-week lockdown extension, until the end of April. Exempt from the lockdown are people deemed necessary to the effective response to the pandemic such as:

- health workers, pharmacy and laboratory personnel, emergency personnel;
- security services (police officers, military personnel, and private security);
- people regarded as necessary to the basic functioning of the economy (supermarkets, transportation and logistical services, petrol stations, banks, essential financial and payment services); and
- those working in industries that can not be economically shut down (such as mines and steel mills).

During the lockdown, all gatherings except for funerals were prohibited. Restaurants, taverns, bottle stores and all other stores not selling essential goods were to close during the lockdown period. Schools, already closed a week before the lockdown period, will not reopen until after the lockdown. Non-exempt people are only allowed to leave their homes during this period to access health services, collect social grants, attend small funerals (no more than 50 people) and shop for essential goods. See the South African Government Gazette 25 March 2020 for a complete list of exemptions and non-exemptions during the lockdown period. South Africans were ordered not to take their dogs for a walk during the lockdown, though they may walk them around their house or apartment building.

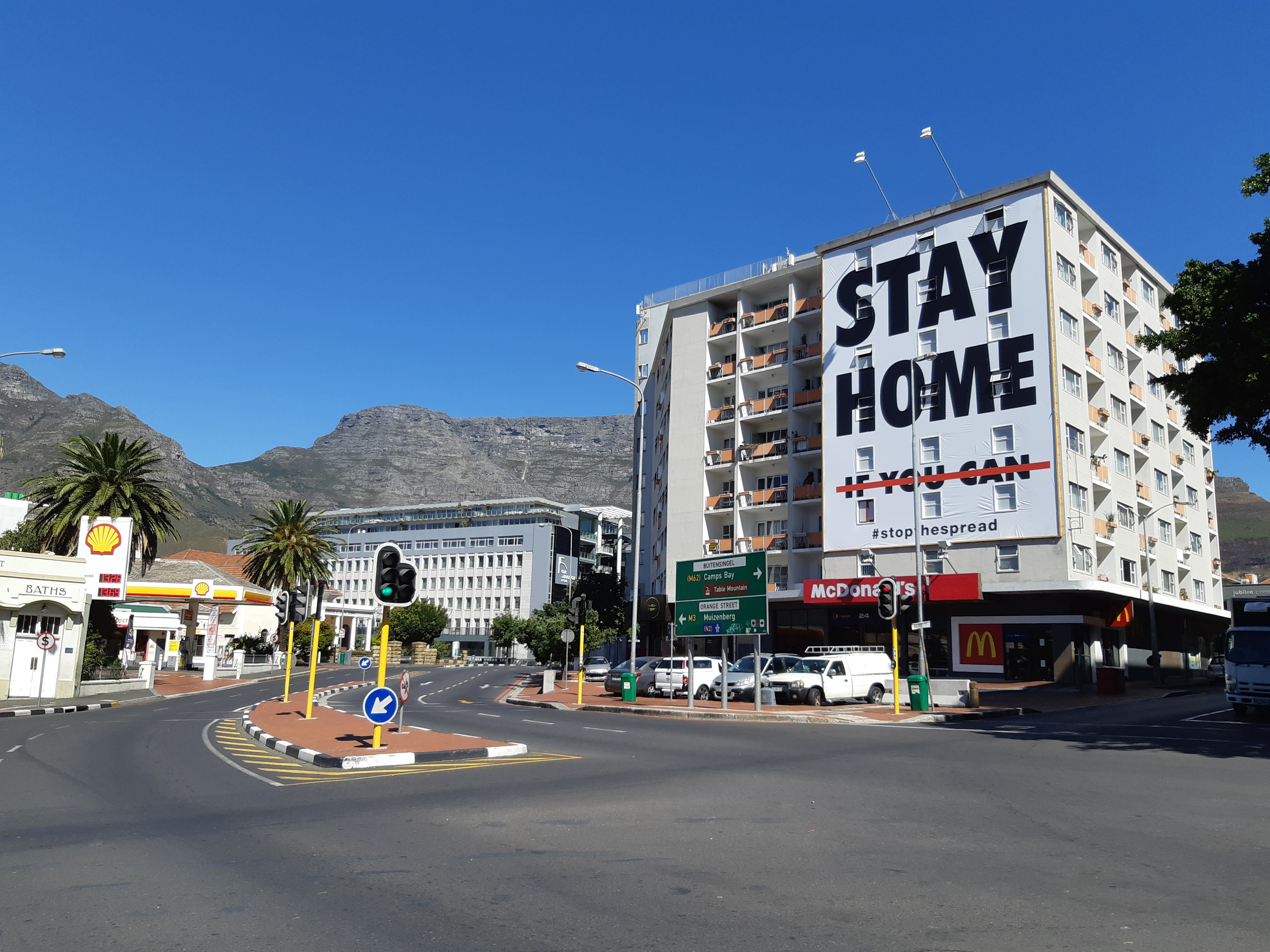
A billboard at the end of Long Street, Cape Town encourages people to stay at home during the lockdown period.

People may not be evicted from their place of residence during the lockdown.

Movement between provinces, and between metropolitan and district areas are prohibited except for

- essential workers, to and from work;
- transportation of sanitised and disinfected cargo from ports of entry;
- the transportation of mortal remains; and
- the attendance of funerals (restricted).

All borders of the country are closed during the lockdown, except for designated ports of entry for the transportation of fuel, cargo, and goods.

International and domestic passenger flights are prohibited, except for flights authorised by the Ministry of Transport, for the evacuation of South African nationals in foreign countries, and for certain repatriations.

=== Fewer deaths ===
The lockdown resulted in fewer deaths from road accidents and homicides. During Easter, from 9 April 2020 to 13 April, there were 28 fatalities from road accidents during the lockdown, compared to 162 in 2019. During the lockdown, 432 murder cases were reported, compared to 1542 during the same period the previous year: 29 March 2019 to 22 April 2019. Overall deaths for the year up to 21 April 2020 were "generally within the bounds of expectation" according to the Medical Research Council. Nonetheless, for the 5 weeks before 21 April 2020, non-natural deaths including those from homicide and road traffic accidents were lower for both females and males.

=== Enforcement ===
Minister of Police Bheki Cele announced, on 5 April, a reduction in cash-in-transit thefts thanks to increased road blocks and more visible policing. He also announced a reduced murder rate. Trauma related hospital admission decreased by two-thirds. By the end of the first seven days of the lockdown a total of 2,289 people had been arrested for violating lockdown orders. Minister Cele announced, on 13 November, that from July to September, compared to 2019, many different crimes ranging from contact and property crimes to sexual offences all declined because of national lock-down.

Minister of Communications and Digital Technologies Stella Ndabeni-Abrahams, on 8 April, was put on special leave for two months, one without pay, for violating lockdown regulations. A picture of her appeared on social media while having lunch at ANC NEC member Mduduzi Manana's home.

Enforcement was done across the country with varying degrees of success. In the Eastern Cape it was reported in early April that little to no enforcement of the lockdown was implemented in at least some of the province's rural areas.

The use of force by police and SANDF personnel was controversial with multiple reports of excessive force in enforcing the lockdown. This included incidents of beatings and preventing people from filming police abuses leading the public advocacy group Right2Know to release a statement that the police had no right to prevent the public "from exercising their constitutional right to film and record incidents".

By 3 April, the eighth day of the lockdown, the Independent Police Investigative Directorate (IPID) reported that they were investigating eight deaths involving the police since the start of the lockdown. At the time, this exceeded the number of deaths in the country due to the pandemic. This was in-spite of President Ramaphosa's public call for police restraint. By 12 April a total of nine people had died due to police and army action following the beating to death of a man in Alexandra by the army.

The South African National Editors' Forum issued a statement expressing concern over police action denying the media access to sites when covering COVID-19 related stories. On 27 April the Office of the United Nations High Commissioner for Human Rights expressed concerns about the heavy handed and highly militarised enforcement of COVID-19 related lockdown measures in a number of countries including South Africa. By 30 April the government confirmed that a total of five people were alleged to have been killed by police within the first three weeks of the lock down along with 152 incidents of assault by police.

The Pretoria High Court ordered the South African government to take steps to prevent police abuse during the lockdown, following the death of Collins Khosa, who died of injuries after being beaten by the police.

== Impact ==
=== Economic ===
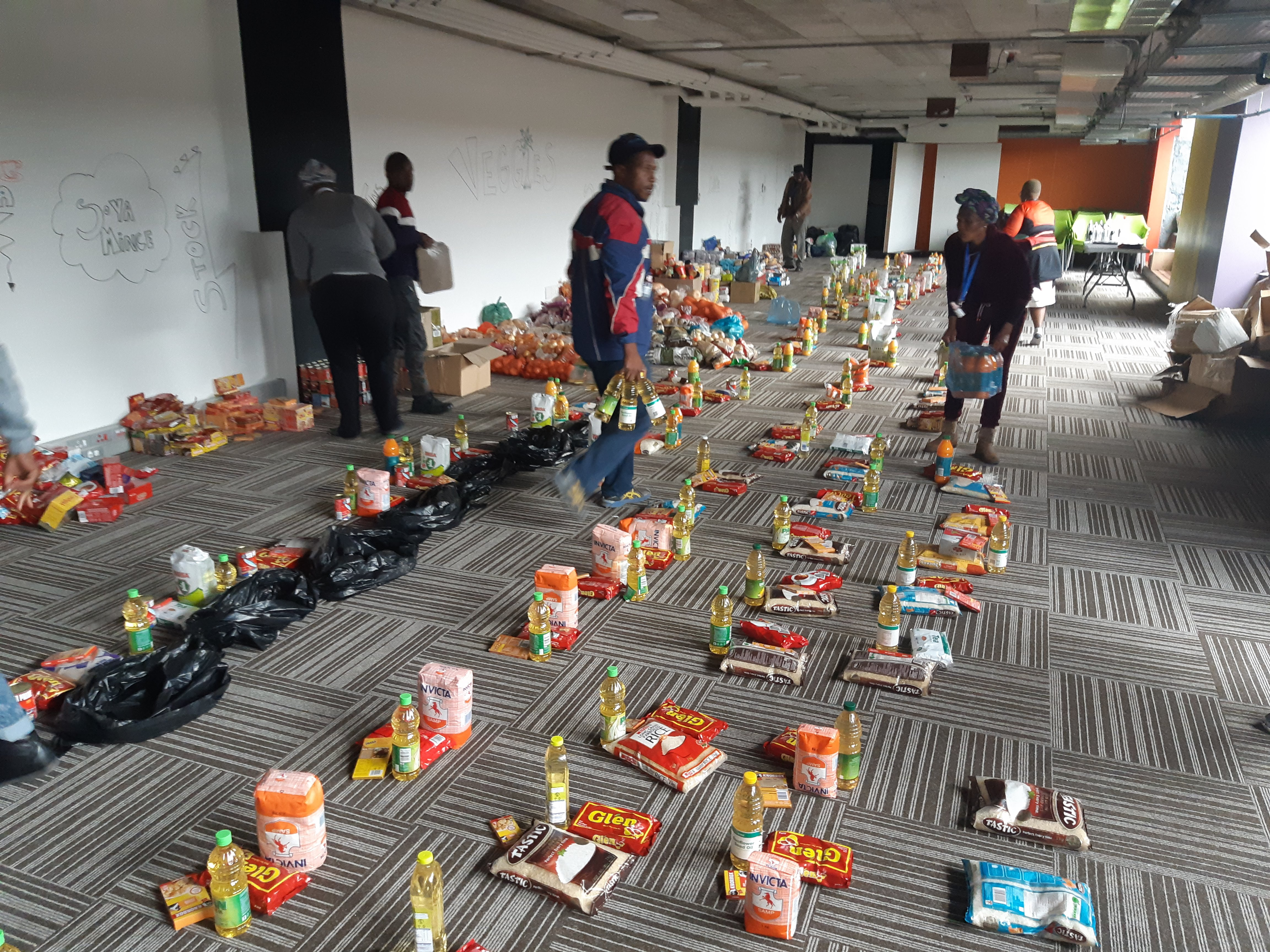
Volunteers in Philippi, Western Cape packing food parcels to be given out to the needy during the COVID 19 pandemic lockdown. The lockdown had a seriously negative impact on South Africa's economy that hit the poor and unemployed especially hard.

At the beginning of the national shutdown on 27 March South African economists predicted that the pandemic could cause a 2.5% to 10% contraction of South Africa's total GDP in 2020. The national lockdown and resulting economic slowdown reduced demand for electricity by more than 7500 MW thereby temporarily reducing the impact of the long running South African energy crisis. It is estimated that the government would experience a revenue shortfall for 2020 of between R70 and 100 billion. This resulted in the South African government announcing a R500 billion stimulus package thereby accelerating deficit spending from 6.8% to over 10% of GDP for the 2020 financial year. In late July it was announced that South Africa would be taking out a R70 billion IMF loan increasing the country's total debt to GDP ratio to 83%. Trade unions and the EFF were critical of using the IMF to take out the loan whilst the DA and other opposition political parties voiced concern over corruption when using the borrowed funds.

The Johannesburg Stock Exchange lost 15% of its value in the week ending 13 March 2020, its worst week in 21 years. On 19 March, the South African Reserve Bank governor, Lesetja Kganyago announced a reduction of the country's repo rate by 100 basis points or 1 percentage point to 5.25%. On 14 April, a further reduction to 4.25% per year was made. On 22 March, Standard Bank announced a 90-day payment holiday for small and medium-sized business and students to try and shield them from the economic impact of the outbreak, starting from 1 April. In May it was estimated that the state will lose R285-billion in tax revenue for the financial year 2020–21 due to the pandemic and resulting lockdown.

Within the first month of the lockdown three million South Africans had lost their jobs contributing to an increase in food insecurity and poverty. By mid-July wide spread food shortages were reported across the country and in rural Eastern Cape in particular. In December 2020 it was reported by Finfind and the Department of Small Business Development that 42.7% of small businesses in South Africa had closed due to the economic impact of the lockdown.

Financial services company Transaction Capital predicted that the protracted years-long lockdown that the ANC government implemented in response to the pandemic would cause 34% of households in South Africa to fall out of the middle class.

=== Corruption and profit gouging ===
Corruption has had a significant negative impact on efforts to fight the pandemic by inflating the costs of government procurement whilst eroding public confidence in government institutions. Years of corruption prior to the pandemic has reduced the capacity of the country's health service. Incidents of police corruption also increased during the lockdown period as security officials used their expanded positions of power to extort bribes from members of the public. Concerns were raised that funds from a COVID-19-related R70 billion IMF loan to South Africa would be lost through corruption. On 7 August President Ramaphosa announced that ministerial committee would be set up to investigate COVID-19 corruption in state tenders.

In late July President Ramaphosa announced that measures would be implemented to combat corruption in the delivery of food parcels and the procurement of exorbitantly priced goods. The Special Investigation Unit (SIU) stated that it was investigating a number of suspicious transactions and alleged acts of corruption from the R500 billion COVID-19 Relief Fund. A number of government officials implicated in allegations of COVID-19-related corruption include Ace Magashule, the wife of Bandile Masuku, and the husband of presidential spokesperson Khusela Diko. Magashule, Diko and Masuku have denied any involvement in COVID-19 related procurement corruption allegations.

An investigation into COVID related fraud at the City of Johannesburg found that over 1,500 employees of the City improperly received COVID-19 related social relief and grants.

Notable COVID-19 corruption or profit gouging scandals included:

- Digital Vibes scandal valued at R150 million
- Gauteng Education Department school sanitisation scandal valued at R431 million
- Red Roses Africa disinfectant supply scandal valued at R515 million
- Sicuro Safety and Hennox Supplies profit gouging scandals
- Kwazulu-Natal government PPE procurement scandal
- The improper procurement and illegal importation of Heberon Alfa R 2b from Cuba by the South African National Defence Force (SANDF).

=== Social impact ===
The Rise of Gender Based Violence

South Africa's COVID-19 lockdown led to a rise in domestic abuse within many South African private spheres. Due to the nationwide five-stage lockdown, families were forced to live in proximity to one another. The national shutdown began at stage five, when the general public, aside from essential services, was confined to their residences. In addition, the government imposed bans on alcohol and cigarettes in stages 5 and 4, with stage 3 permitting the retail sale of alcohol within certain hours during the COVID-19 lockdown. Stage five was implemented from March 26, 2020, to April 30, 2020, and stage four from May 1, 2020, to May 31, 2020, during the COVID-19 lockdown. South Africa's extreme COVID-19 measures significantly reduced individuals' mobility and autonomy, particularly affecting women living in abusive spaces. South Africa already has a high rate of gender-based violence, with one in three women experiencing physical or sexual violence in their lives. Therefore, women were isolated within the home with their abusers while being unable to reach out to any support systems and networks. The restrictions on alcohol lead to a decrease in alcohol-related injuries, but an increased reporting of domestic violence. However, these reports did not affect the government's decision to lift the substance restrictions, as public health was its main priority. Several factors contributed to the rise of domestic violence against women and children during lockdown. Many families faced the change of traditional gender roles being challenged within the home. Men were unable to work in the public sphere and provide financially, and were now involved in the private sphere, which challenged ideas around masculinity within South Africa's patriarchal society. Economic, food, and social insecurities plagued families and intimate partnerships with stress and conflict within homes. Therefore, this increases the number of violent and dangerous situations for women and children within the home. Households with lower socio-economic status (SES) experienced violence stemming from food insecurity, while high SES households experienced violence from the forced proximity. South Africa's COVID-19 lockdown disproportionately impacted women and children within the homes due to being trapped within vulnerable, abusive spaces. The ongoing psychological impacts on women and families during South Africa's 5-stage lockdown need to continue being studied to better understand South Africa's systemic gender based violence.

==== Events cancelled or postponed ====
Major sporting codes suspended their activities, including Super Rugby, 2019–20 Pro14 season, Varsity Rugby, Craven Week, Premier Soccer League, Athletics South Africa, Sunshine Tour golf, Wimpy Lifesaving South Africa national championships and Parkrun. The Cape Epic cycle tour, the 2020 Two Oceans Marathon and the 2020 Comrades Marathon were cancelled. The 2020 Cape Town Rugby Sevens, 4–6 December 2020, were cancelled.

Live events cancelled or postponed included the Mangaung African Cultural Festival (MACUFE), Bloem Show, AfrikaBurn, Cape Town International Jazz Festival, Klein Karoo Nasionale Kunstefees, Splashy Fen Festival, Rand Show, National Arts Festival (changing to virtual), SciFest Africa (postponed to 9–15 September), WWE Live South Africa (postponed until September), Comic Con Cape Town, and Matric Rage festivals in Johannesburg, Jeffreys Bay and Plettenberg Bay. South African tours were postponed by the Lighthouse Family, Boyz II Men and BeBe Winans.

Trade and agricultural shows postponed or cancelled included HuntEx, DecorEx Cape Town & Durban, Tyrexpo (postponed to 4–6 August 2020), Power & Electricity World expo (postponed until 20–21 August), the Pietermaritzburg Royal Show, SA Cheese Festival, Qualité Awards Dinner, and Agri-Expo Western Cape Youth Show.

The Zion Christian Church cancelled its annual Easter pilgrimage. The Muslim Judicial Council (MJC) suspended Friday prayers, then closed mosques altogether on Sunday 22 March, but the call to prayer will still be given. Chief Rabbi Warren Goldstein suspended Synagogues. Traditional circumcision schools in the Eastern Cape were suspended.

The City of Johannesburg closed all public facilities indefinitely including public swimming pools, recreational and civic centres, stadiums, libraries, sporting facilities, and the Johannesburg Zoo. The Ethekhwini Metropolitan Municipality closed all of Durban's public facilities including swimming pools, beaches, libraries, community halls, and museums while restrictions have been put in place for the Durban Art Gallery and cemeteries to only allow 50 people at a time. The City of Cape Town closed all public facilities indefinitely including public swimming pools, recreational and civic centres, stadiums, sporting facilities, and the nature reserves.

The 2021 Women's FIH Hockey Junior World Cup because of a new COVID-19 variant, the tournament was put on hold on 26 November 2021 and a decision will be made by the FIH in the near future. Ballito Rage 2021 cancelled after 36 test positive for Covid-19, Plett Rage festival cancelled.

==== Protests ====
On 5 August, members of the entertainment, restaurant, fitness, and events industries staged a socially distanced national protest by lighting buildings red. The #LightSAred campaign was staged so as to highlight the negative economic impact of the COVID-19 lockdown measures on these industries.

==== Looting ====
In April 2020, a number of liquor stores and food stores were targeted by looters in the Cape Town suburbs of Elsies River, Delft South, Samora Machel, Manenberg, Sherwood Park, Nyanga Junction, and Gatesville. On 21 July 2020, a truck carrying COVID-19 specimens was hijacked at a clinic in Motherwell, Eastern Cape and found abandoned 500 metres away.

==== Migration ====
In a trend dubbed "semigration" the South African media has reported that the pandemic catalyzed significant movement of wealthier South Africans from cities in Gauteng province (notably Johannesburg) to urban areas of the Western Cape province (notably Cape Town). A trend that, although accelerated by the pandemic, was reportedly driven by an increased desire for access to natural amenities, the ability to work remotely, and better municipal management.

=== Birth sex ratio change ===
Between September 2012 and December 2020, the sex ratio at birth declined and inverted (less than 50%) in June 2020 for the first time. This drop, attributed to population stress, took place three months after COVID-19 in South Africa started in March 2020.

=== Spread ===
Model-based simulations indicate that the 95% confidence interval for the time-varying reproduction number R_{t} was higher than 1.0 until mid-July, exceeding 1.0 again from late October to December 2020.

== Statistics ==
=== Cumulative cases ===
==== Nationwide ====
View source data.
View source data.

=== Daily cases ===
View source data.
View source data.
View source data.

==== By province ====
Cases in South Africa by province (total and per capita).

Number of active COVID-19 cases in South African provinces

===== Gauteng =====
Cases in Gauteng Province metros with Johannesburg detail.

== Misinformation ==
The arrival of the COVID-19 virus in South Africa saw an increase in the dissemination of misinformation about the virus on social media and other platforms. These range from messages minimising the virus's harm in the country to the propagation of conspiracy theories about government actions to control the virus.

Deliberately spreading fake news and other misinformation in South Africa about the virus was declared an offence punishable by a fine, six months' imprisonment, or both.

One individual was arrested for posting a video showing himself drinking in public with friends following the national lock-down whilst stating that there was "nothing called corona here". In another incident a man claimed that 10000 government officials would be going door-to-door using contaminated test kits to test people for the virus. A conspiracy theory that Bill Gates wished to test a COVID-19 "vaccine" in Africa or South Africa first caused significant controversy on social media following the publication of a now retracted story in News24.

Fake news that 5G cellular technology was the true cause of COVID-19 symptoms also spread in the country during this period as it also did in other countries around the world. In the course of it, three telecommunication towers belonging to Vodacom and MTN were burnt by protesters.

== Vaccination ==
On 17 February 2021, South Africa started its national vaccination program against Covid-19. The program went through in phases, prioritizing healthcare and frontline workers, followed by citizens over the age of 60. South Africa has accepted delivery of 3 different vaccines, Johnson and Johnson's Janssen, Pfizer-BioNTech's Comirnaty, and Oxford-AstraZeneca; administering both Janssen and Comirnaty, but the Oxford-AstraZeneca vaccine was suspended due to its relative lack of protection against the Beta variant (501.V2).

On 29 March 2022, South African health officials said that about 92,370 expired doses of Pfizer's COVID-19 vaccine were to be destroyed by the end of March due to a low uptake by citizens.

On 8 April 2022 there were 2 vaccination schedules
Primary schedule					Booster doses			
1st dose	interval	2nd dose	interval	immunocompromised prescribed/registered additional dose	interval	1st booster	interval	2nd booster
Janssen			28-92+ days	Janssen or Comirnaty	60 days	Janssen or Comirnaty	90 days	Janssen or Comirnaty (Note: 1 of the last 3 doses must be Comirnaty.)
Comirnaty	21 days	Comirnaty	28-92+ days	Comirnaty or Janssen	90 days	Comirnaty or Janssen		

As of 9 April 2022, there were 34118324 vaccine doses administered in South Africa.

== See also ==
- COVID-19 pandemic in Africa
- COVID-19 vaccination in South Africa
- COVID-19 pandemic by country and territory
- List of COVID-19 deaths in South Africa
- List of deaths due to COVID-19
- 2020 in South Africa
- 2021 in South Africa
