= Enoch Godongwana =

South African politician

The Honourable Enoch Godongwana MP
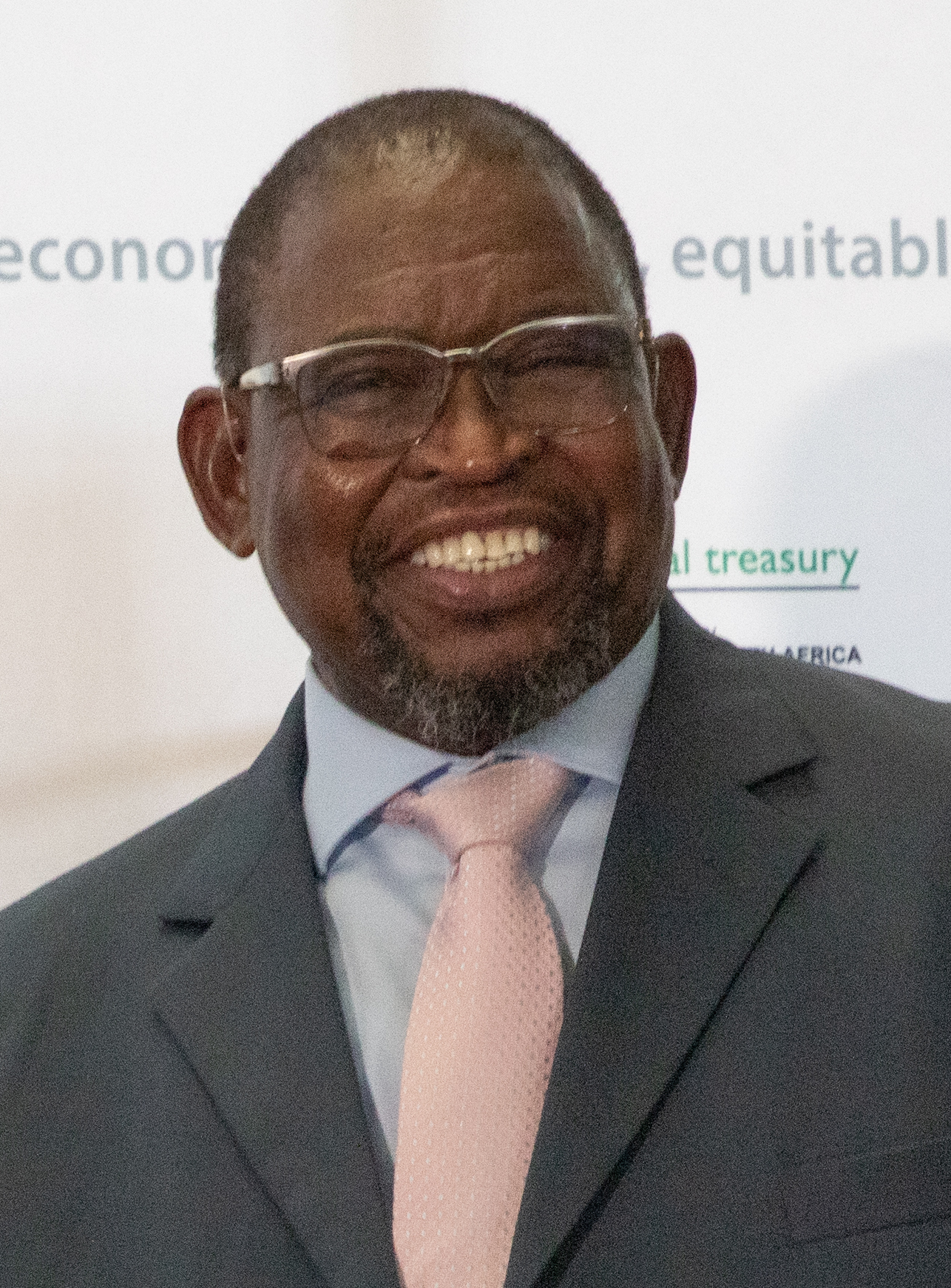
- Godongwana in 2023

Minister of Finance
- Incumbent
- Assumed office 5 August 2021
- President: Cyril Ramaphosa
- Deputy: David Masondo; Ashor Sarupen
- Preceded by: Tito Mboweni

Member of the National Assembly
- Incumbent
- Assumed office 28 February 2023
- Constituency: Eastern Cape
- In office 14 November 2008 – 31 December 2011

Deputy Minister of Economic Development
- In office 31 October 2010 – 16 January 2012
- President: Jacob Zuma
- Minister: Ebrahim Patel
- Preceded by: Gwen Mahlangu-Nkabinde
- Succeeded by: Hlengiwe Mkhize

Deputy Minister of Public Enterprises
- In office 10 May 2009 – 31 October 2010
- President: Jacob Zuma
- Minister: Barbara Hogan
- Succeeded by: Ben Martins

Personal details
- Born: 9 June 1957 (age 69) Cala, Cape Province; Union of South Africa
- Party: African National Congress
- Spouse: Thandiwe Godongwana
- Education: University of London

Enoch Godongwana (born 9 June 1957) is a South African politician and former trade unionist who is currently serving as the Minister of Finance since August 2021. He is a member of the National Executive Committee of the African National Congress (ANC).

Born in the Eastern Cape, Godongwana rose to political prominence as the general secretary of the National Union of Metalworkers between 1993 and 1997. After that, from 1997 to 2004, he served in the Executive Council of the Eastern Cape as Member of the Executive Council for Finance. He was first elected to the ANC National Executive Committee in December 1997, and he was the Deputy Provincial Chairperson of the ANC's Eastern Cape branch from 2003 to 2006 under Chairperson Makhenkesi Stofile. Premier Nosimo Balindlela sacked him from the Executive Council under controversial circumstances in September 2004.

Between May 2009 and January 2012, Godongwana was a deputy minister under the first cabinet of President Jacob Zuma. He was Deputy Minister of Public Enterprises from 2009 to 2010 and Deputy Minister of Economic Development from 2010 to 2012. He resigned from the latter position in January 2012 after a scandal involving one of his business interests, an investment company called Canyon Springs. However, he remained a prominent figure as long-serving chairperson of the ANC National Executive Committee's subcommittee on economic transformation, and he was chairperson of the Development Bank of Southern Africa from 2019 to 2021. He was appointed to the cabinet of President Cyril Ramaphosa on 5 August 2021.

== Early life and education ==
Godongwana was born on 9 June 1957 in Cala in the former Cape Province, now part of the Eastern Cape. He matriculated at St John's College in Mthatha, and he completed an MSc in financial economics at the University of London in 1998.

== Trade union career ==
Godongwana began his political career in the trade union movement, beginning as a shop steward for the Metal and Allied Workers' Union in 1979 and rising through the ranks to become an organiser for the National Union of Metalworkers (Numsa) between 1983 and 1989. He was Numsa's regional secretary from 1990 until 1993, when he was elected to succeed Moses Mayekiso as its national general secretary. He served as general secretary until 1997, when he stepped down and was succeeded by Mbuyi Ngwenda.

At the same time, he was a member of the executive committee of the Congress of South African Trade Unions (Cosatu) from 1992 to 1997, as well as the chairperson of Cosatu's economic development task force. He was also a founding member of the National Economic Development and Labour Council (NEDLAC), and represented labour during the drafting of post-apartheid labour legislation, including the Labour Relations Act of 1995. The Financial Mail credited Godongwana for bringing Numsa, a notoriously militant and workerist union, "into the Cosatu fold", as well as for setting it up for the major expansion in membership that it subsequently underwent.

== Eastern Cape Executive Council: 1997–2004 ==
Godongwana left the union movement in 1997 to take office in the Executive Council of the Eastern Cape, appointed by Premier Makhenkesi Stofile as Member of the Executive Council (MEC) for Finance, Economic Affairs, Environment and Tourism. After the April 2004 general election, his large portfolio was divided and he became MEC for Finance alone, now under Premier Nosimo Balindlela, with the rest of the portfolio given to new MEC Andre de Wet. In the Executive Council and Eastern Cape Provincial Legislature, he represented the African National Congress (ANC), Cosatu's Tripartite Alliance partner.

Between 1998 and 2002, Godongwana instituted a "single government chequebook" in the provincial government, reducing the ability of other departments to pursue discretionary spending. The measure led to improved audit outcomes and facilitated spending cutbacks.

=== ANC leadership ===
During his tenure in the provincial government, at the ANC's 50th National Conference in December 1997, Godongwana was elected for the first time to the party's National Executive Committee (NEC). He was re-elected to a second five-year term on the committee in December 2002. Although his ties to the left wing of the Tripartite Alliance apparently put him at odds with the ANC's incumbent national leadership, he rose in stature in the Provincial Executive Committee of the ANC in the Eastern Cape.

On 26 April 2003, he was elected to succeed Stone Sizani as Deputy Provincial Chairperson of the Eastern Cape ANC, deputising Premier Stofile. Godongwana won in a crowded field of candidates, receiving 177 votes against the 125 to Phumulo Masualle, 98 to Mandisi Mpahlwa, and 83 to Thobile Mhlahlo. The vote followed an earlier iteration of the election – with the same outcome – which had been held in 2002 but annulled and rerun at the request of the NEC. He held the Deputy Provincial Chairperson position for a single term, stepping down in December 2006 to be succeeded by Mbulelo Sogoni.

=== Dismissal and aftermath ===
On 6 September 2004, Premier Balindlela sacked Godongwana as MEC for Finance, replacing him with Billy Nel. Balindlela's office said that his dismissal was related to "a probe into financial irregularities" in the provincial Department of Finance. Godongwana remained an ordinary Member of the Provincial Legislature until November, when he resigned from his seat.

The reasons for Godongwana's dismissal remained unclear, and his departure created tensions in the provincial Tripartite Alliance. In 2008, media published a leaked copy of the report of the three-person Pillay Commission, chaired by Judge Ronnie Pillay, which had investigated financial irregularities in the administration of former Premier Stofile. Pillay's report implicated Godongwana, Stofile, and Stone Sizani in maladministration and corruption in their respective departments. However, the trio rejected Pillay's findings and mounted a court challenge, which succeeded in May 2005 when the Grahamstown High Court discarded the report on review.

== Legislative hiatus: 2004–2008 ==
After leaving the provincial government, he served as head of the Financial Sector Charter Council, while also managing various personal business interests; by 2009, he was a director of 24 different companies, including Denel and the Pan African Insurance Group. Meanwhile, he was re-elected to the ANC NEC at the 52nd National Conference in Polokwane in December 2007. He received 1,891 votes across roughly 4,000 ballots, making him the 34th-most popular member of the 80-member committee. He reportedly supported Tokyo Sexwale's abortive presidential campaign ahead of the conference.

After the 52nd Conference, the NEC appointed Godongwana to succeed Geraldine Fraser-Moleketi as the chairperson of the NEC's subcommittee on labour. However, during the five-year term of the 52nd NEC, that subcommittee was disbanded, and Godongwana took up a highly influential role as chairperson for policy in the subcommittee on economic transformation, the overall chair of which was Max Sisulu.

== National Assembly: 2008–2012 ==
On 14 November 2008, Godongwana joined the National Assembly, the lower house of the South African Parliament. He filled a casual vacancy in the seat formerly held by Geraldine Fraser-Moleketi, who was among the ministers who resigned after the ANC removed President Thabo Mbeki from office.

=== Deputy ministerial offices ===
Godongwana was re-elected to a full term in the National Assembly in the April 2009 general election, and he was also appointed Deputy Minister of Public Enterprises under the first cabinet of newly elected President Jacob Zuma. In that office, he deputised Minister Barbara Hogan. Until the cabinet announcement, he had been touted as a possible choice for appointment as Deputy Minister of Finance.

On 31 October 2010, Zuma announced his first cabinet reshuffle, in which Godongwana was moved to succeed Gwen Mahlangu-Nkabinde as Deputy Minister of Economic Development. The Department of Economic Development had been newly created after the 2009 election and was led by Minister Ebrahim Patel, also a former trade unionist.

=== Canyon Springs controversy ===
Godongwana chaired Canyon Springs Investments 12, a shell company which he jointly owned 50% of with his wife. Canyon Springs was found to be involved in allegedly defrauding clothing factory workers of R100-million of their pension fund money from 2007 until 2011. His R1.5 million salary was found to be drawn from money loaned by the Southern African Clothing and Textile Workers’ Union (Sactwu) to the company, which loaned money was never returned to the union. He claimed to be unaware of the company's money sources.

Richard Kawie and Sam Buthelezi, other co-owners of Canyons Springs Investment 12, had fraud cases opened against them for not repaying the union's loan.

=== Resignation ===
On 15 January 2012, presidential spokesperson Mac Maharaj said that Godongwana had resigned as Deputy Minister of Economic Development "to pursue personal interests". Godongwana had apparently resigned in early December and been asked to stay on until mid-January. He also resigned from the National Assembly with effect from 31 December 2011, ceding his seat to Shepherd Mayathula.

Godongwana denied that his resignation was related to the Canyon Springs controversy, saying that he had realised he would be busy with "party work" in 2012. The Canyon Springs liquidation inquiry continued until August 2012. According to Sactwu, the matter was concluded in January 2017 when Godongwana reached a settlement with the union, in terms of which he repaid Sactwu with interest.

== Legislative hiatus: 2012–2021 ==
Over the next decade, Godongwana was absent from legislative politics. During this period, and among other pursuits, he held non-executive directorships at the Development Bank of Southern Africa (DBSA), the New Development Bank, Mondi PLC, Platinum Group Metals, and several other companies. He also ran a consultancy and was a visiting fellow at the Wits School of Governance from 2018 to 2021.

=== ANC economic transformation ===
==== Nationalisation of mining ====
Godongwana retained his most prominent public profile through the ANC's NEC subcommittee on economic transformation. Indeed, he led a task team of the subcommittee that, in 2012, provided recommendations to the NEC about the role of the state in the mining sector. The task team had been established after the ANC's 2010 national general council in Durban, at which the ANC Youth League derailed the agenda to open a debate about the nationalisation of mines. After that council, Godongwana said that the NEC had not paid enough attention to the ANC Youth League's proposal before then, saying, "If I had done my work, we would not have been here now". The first report of his task team, published in early 2012 under the title State Intervention in the Minerals Sector, made fairly moderate recommendations. He was later described as "part of the team that pushed back against the call to nationalise the mines".

==== Treasury reshuffles ====
Re-elected to the NEC in December 2012, Godongwana was also appointed to succeed Max Sisulu as overall economic subcommittee chairperson. In this capacity, Godongwana frequently provided critical commentary on the turbulence that arose at the National Treasury during Zuma's second term as president. For example, in December 2015, markets reacted adversely to a controversial cabinet reshuffle, in which Zuma replaced Finance Minister Nhlanhla Nene with Des van Rooyen, a relatively unknown politician with links to the Gupta family. When Minister Lindiwe Zulu was quoted as saying that the market reaction was the result of manipulation intended to undermine Zuma, Godongwana publicly questioned this claim and challenged Zulu to provide evidence. Years later, Lungisa Fuzile, who was director-general in the Treasury at time, told the Zondo Commission that Godongwana had called to warn him about the implications of the reshuffle. According to Fuzile, Godongwana had told him to "watch it" because "You are now going to get a Gupta minister who will arrive with his advisers."

The following year, when new Finance Minister Pravin Gordhan was facing fraud charges, Godongwana was among the politicians who defended Gordhan and implied that the charges had political motives. He told eNCA that, "I share that view that in fact these charges are being concocted in order to cover all of those things [misconduct], to find a minister which [sic] is pliant, which is going to accept all those things". He also said that he would join public demonstrations in support of Gordhan, because "We can not be silent as South Africans when people who are running good governance are being undermined." In 2017, he questioned the decision of Gordhan's successor, Malusi Gigaba, to appoint Chris Malikane, a controversial figure reportedly linked to the Gupta family, as his economic adviser.

==== Land expropriation ====
Also in 2017, Godongwana was involved in mediating the ongoing policy dispute around two populist proposals of the pro-Zuma radical economic transformation faction: a proposal to nationalise ownership of the South African Reserve Bank (SARB) and, particularly important, a proposal to expropriate land without compensation. Under Godongwana's leadership, the economic subcommittee argued that transformation platforms should consider the state's fiscal position. Indeed, in March 2017, Godongwana dismissed the call for "radical economic transformation" as rhetoric, telling the Mail & Guardian:

These people who are making radical changes... what are those radical changes? People must be tested whether they are proposing practical things. They're talking abstract. Can you ask them to say 'These are the practical things to be done?'

Godongwana personally argued against amending the Constitution to allow for land expropriation without compensation, saying that land reform had been obstructed by a lack of political will rather than by the constitutional framework. He later elaborated that previous governments had made "a lot of mistakes" in pursuing land reform, including blindly accepting the principle that expropriated land should be compensated at market value. However, at the ANC's 54th National Conference in December 2017, Godongwana was involved in drafting a policy resolution that endorsed the plan to amend the Constitution to allow for land expropriation without compensation, provided that doing so was sustainable and did not harm other economic sectors. His involvement in devising this compromise led some to credit him with "saving" the conference, which was almost derailed by fierce debate about the land issue. The Financial Mail said that Godongwana had mastered "the art of producing vague, watered-down compromises in the guise of economic policy" as a means to constraining the "worst excesses" of the ANC's left.

At the same conference, Godongwana supported Cyril Ramaphosa's successful bid to succeed Zuma as ANC president, and he was himself re-elected to the NEC, ranked 31st of 80 members. In the aftermath of the conference, he was reappointed chairperson of the economic subcommittee.

=== Development Bank of Southern Africa ===
In September 2019, Godongwana was appointed chairperson of the board of DBSA, deputised by Mark Swilling. In October 2020, Bantu Holomisa of the opposition United Democratic Movement wrote to Parliament's Standing Committee on Public Accounts to draw attention to what he described as "maladministration, mismanagement and possible deep-rooted corruption" at DBSA. He also complained about Godongwana's leadership, saying that Godongwana was unsuitable for the chairmanship as a "politically exposed person" and that he had turned the institution "into his personal spaza shop".

DBSA denied Holomisa's allegations and said that Godongwana's political exposure did not make him ineligible for the job. Finance Minister Tito Mboweni appeared before the Standing Committee on Public Accounts in June 2021 and said that the allegations were unfounded and emanated from a "bitter" former board member.

== Minister of Finance: 2021–present ==
On 5 August 2021, President Cyril Ramaphosa reshuffled his cabinet, announcing that Godongwana would take office as Minister of Finance. He succeeded Tito Mboweni, who had asked to stand down. The markets responded adversely to the announcement, with the rand losing value, but recovered quickly, viewed as a reflection of Godongwana's existing reputation with investors. Observers also noted that Godongwana's political relationships across the Tripartite Alliance probably lent him more political capital than Mboweni had. He was appointed to the cabinet from outside Parliament until 28 February 2023, when he was sworn in to the National Assembly, replacing Mike Basopu.

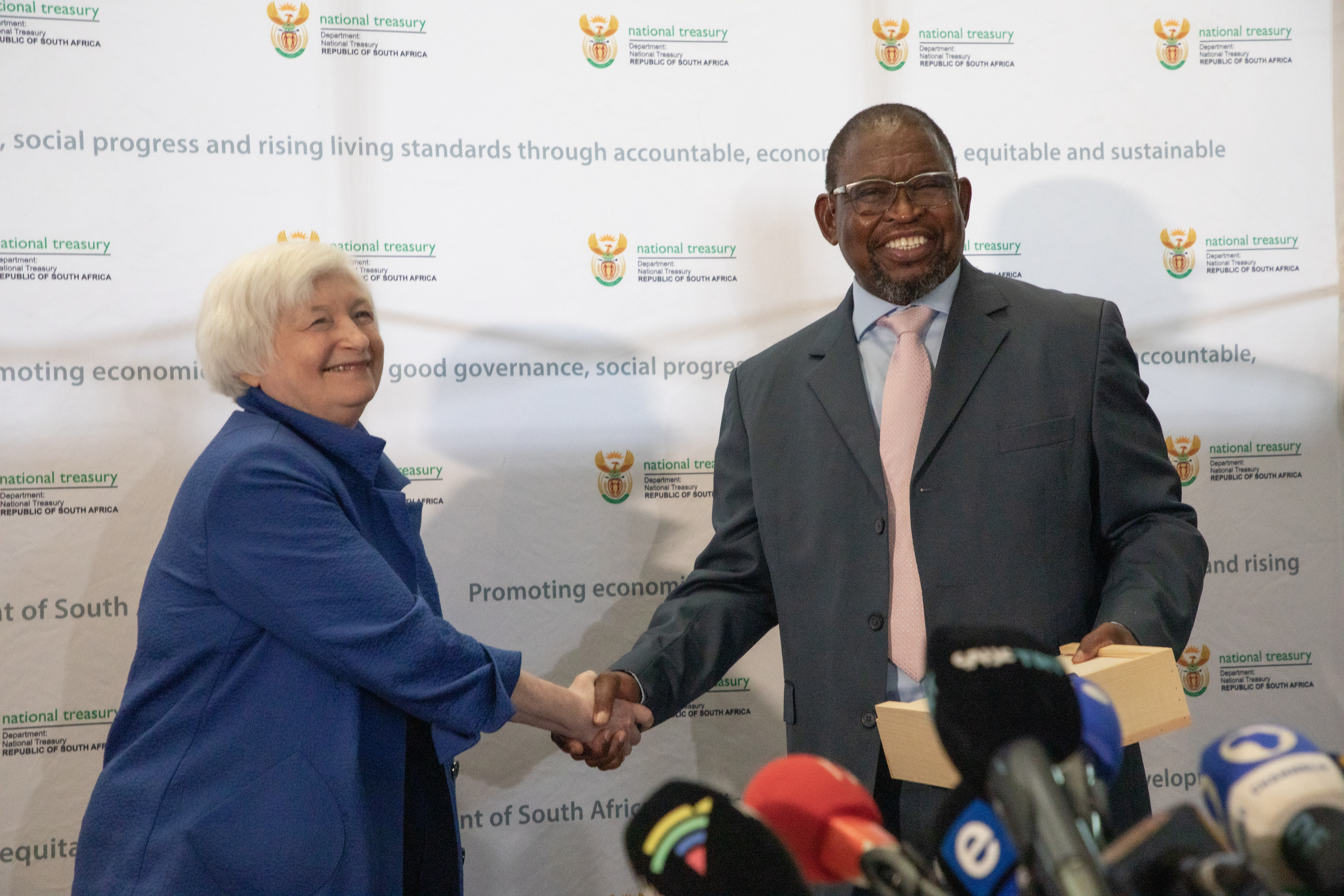
Godongwana with United States Treasury Secretary Janet Yellen in November 2022

He was sworn into president Ramaphosa's third cabinet on 3 July 2024.

=== Fiscal consolidation ===
In his first medium-term budget speech in November 2021, Godongwana emphasised fiscal discipline and announced a policy of "tough love" towards South Africa's struggling state-owned enterprises, including Eskom. Godongwana told Parliament:

We must be prepared to consolidate some of our state-owned entities and let go of those that are no longer considered strategically relevant. As far as SOEs are concerned, I think what I want to do is practice tough love.

In future years, he gained a reputation as a staunch champion of fiscal consolidation and as "the finance minister with one of the tightest grips on the country's purse strings". When asked about his former communist ideological leanings – he had been a member of the South African Communist Party in his union days – Godongwana said, "There are practical solutions and practical problems against which, sometimes, abstract ideologies don’t hold."

=== ANC leadership ===
In November 2021, Godongwana said that he would step down as the chair of the NEC's subcommittee on economic transformation in order to allow younger leaders to emerge. Mmamoloko Kubayi replaced him in April 2022. At the ANC's next national conference, held at Nasrec in December 2022, Godongwana was re-elected to the NEC, ranked 19th of 80. He was also reappointed an ordinary member of the economic transformation subcommittee, which was to remain under Kubayi's leadership; and the NEC elected him to the influential ANC National Working Committee as one of the most popular candidates – he tied with Barbara Creecy for second place behind Kubayi.

By that time, Godongwana was viewed as a member of President Ramaphosa's inner circle, particularly as a member of the group sometimes called the "Chris Hani cabal". Also including Gwede Mantashe, Oscar Mabuyane, and Mondli Gungubele, this group was from the Eastern Cape and was influential in Ramaphosa's camp in the ANC.

== Personal life ==
He is married to Thandiwe Godongwana, with whom he has children. He is known for wearing feathered homburg hats.

In December 2001, while Godongwana was serving in the Eastern Cape Executive Council, the East London Magistrate's Court convicted him of drunk driving. He had been arrested in February and had failed a blood alcohol content test after he refused to submit to a breathalyser. He pled guilty to the charge, saying in mitigation that he had been driving because his niece had asked him for a lift, and he told press that it was "an error of judgement on my part, which I indeed regret. I am terribly sorry". He was fined R8,000 in lieu of serving 200 days in prison, with half of the fine suspended; he was also given a prison sentence of three years, suspended for the duration.

In August 2022, a masseuse at a game reserve in the Kruger National Park laid a complaint of sexual harassment against Godongwana, who she said had touched her inappropriately during a massage. He strongly denied the allegation. He told the Business Day that he believed the allegations were being used to "smear" him "to achieve narrow and selfish political ends" ahead of the ANC's upcoming national conference, and he undertook to continue "focusing on the critical tasks of revitalising our economy and protecting the fiscus". In late September, the National Prosecuting Authority said that, having assessed the evidence, it would not prosecute Godongwana.

Political offices
Preceded by Tito Mboweni	Minister of Finance; 2021–	Incumbent
Preceded by Moses Mayekiso	General Secretary of the National Union of Metalworkers of South Africa; 1993–1996	Succeeded by Mbuyiselo Ngwenda
