= William Henry Clegg =

South African businessman (1867–1945)

William Henry Clegg (1867 – 16 March 1945) was the first Governor of the South African Reserve Bank, serving from 17 December 1920 until 31 December 1931. He was succeeded by Johannes Postmus.

== Early life ==
Clegg was born in 1867 in Stanley, West Yorkshire, the son of George Clegg.

== Career ==
Clegg began his banking career in September 1886 when he joined the Bank of England. By 1895, he had become an assistant to the auditor and was promoted to first auditor in 1900. In 1914, he was appointed principal of the branch banks office, and by 1919, he had become the Bank's chief accountant.

In 1920, Clegg was appointed the first Governor of the South African Reserve Bank, a position he held until 1931. After the end of his tenure, he was named chairman of the Commission of Inquiry into the Hong Kong currency. He returned to the Bank of England in 1932, where he served as a director.

== Marriage ==
In 1895, he married Mary Van Valkenburgh Baker. She died from injuries sustained in a fire in 1909. https://www.ancestry.co.uk/family-tree/person/tree/3913282/person/1012313476/facts

In 1916, he married Elinor Constance Mary Clement Bowen (1890-1954) and had two sons and a daughter.

== Death ==
He died on 16 March 1945 at Stillwood House in Winchester, England.
