= De Kok =

de Kok
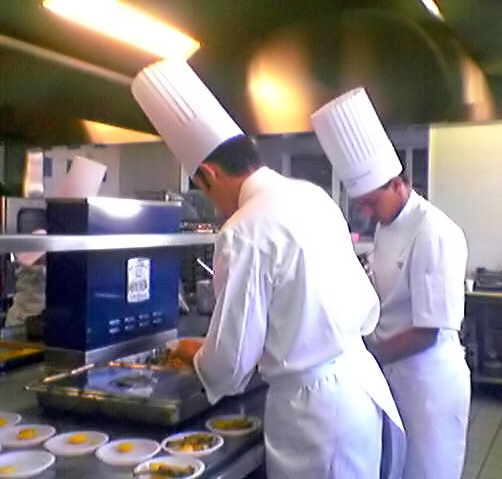
- Two chefs in the process of cooking.

Origin
- Origin: Dutch and Flemish
- Meaning: Derived from the occupation of a cook.

De Kok or DeKok is a Dutch occupational surname. It may refer to:

- Frans de Kok (1924–2011), Dutch conductor
- Frits de Kok (1882–1940), Dutch businessman, CEO of Royal Dutch Shell
- Ingrid de Kok (born 1951), South African author
- Irene de Kok (born 1963), Dutch judoka
- Johannes Antonius de Kok (born 1930), Dutch Roman Catholic bishop
- Roger G. DeKok (1947–2003), United States Air Force commander
- Roosmarijn de Kok (born 1994), Dutch fashion model
- Winifred May de Kok (1893–1969), South African author

== See also ==
- De Cock
- De Kock
- Kok (surname)
