= Webster Mfebe =

South African politician and businessman (born 1959)

Member of the Free State Executive Council for Sports, Arts, Culture, Science and Technology
- In office 1997–2004
- Premier: Ivy Matsepe-Casaburri; Winkie Direko
- Succeeded by: Joel Mafereka

Member of the Free State Provincial Legislature
- In office December 1996 – 2004

Member of the National Assembly
- In office 1994 – December 1996

Personal details
- Born: Mthawelanga Webster Mfebe; 14 July 1959 (age 66)
- Citizenship: South Africa
- Party: African National Congress

Mthawelanga Webster Mfebe (born 14 July 1959) is a South African businessman, politician, and former trade unionist. He has been the chief executive officer of the South African Federation of Civil Engineering Contractors since 2013.

Before entering business full-time, Mfebe represented the African National Congress (ANC) in the National Assembly from 1994 to 1996 and then in the Free State Provincial Legislature from 1996 to 2004. He was the Free State's Member of the Executive Council (MEC) for Sports, Arts, Culture, Science and Technology from 1997 to 2004.

== Early life and career ==
Born on 14 July 1959, Mfebe rose to political prominence during apartheid through the trade union movement and Mass Democratic Movement.

== Legislative career ==
In South Africa's first post-apartheid elections in 1994, Mfebe was elected to an ANC seat in the National Assembly. He remained in the seat until 1996, when he resigned in order to join the Free State Provincial Legislature; he was sworn in on 18 December. He was also appointed to Premier Ivy Matsepe-Casaburri's Executive Council as MEC for Sport, Arts, Culture, Science and Technology. During his first year in the portfolio, his department held the inaugural Mangaung African Cultural Festival (Macufe), an arts festival that thereafter became an annual event.

In the 1999 general election, Mfebe was elected to a full term in the provincial legislature, and newly elected Premier Winkie Direko retained him in his position as MEC. He left the provincial government after the next general election in 2004.

== Later career ==
From 2005 to 2009, Mfebe worked at the SABC, where, among other positions, he was head of sport. From 2009 to 2012, he was executive director for stakeholder relations at Basil Read, a construction company. He also had his own consulting company, Phendula Consulting, as well as non-executive directorships in other companies.

On 1 January 2013, he took office as chief executive officer of the South African Federation of Civil Engineering Contractors (SAFCEC; since renamed the South African Forum of Civil Engineering Contractors), a not-for-profit employers' organisation in the civil engineering sector. In this capacity, Mfebe has occasionally attracted media attention as a critic of government policies, for example through a 2019 open letter he wrote to President Cyril Ramaphosa about the power of extortion rackets targeting the construction sector.
