= Johannes Postmus =

Johannes Postmus (1877 – 1947) was the second Governor of the South African Reserve Bank. His term of office was from 1 January 1932 until 30 June 1945. He was succeeded by Michiel Hendrik de Kock.
