= Moses Mayekiso =

- Born: Moses Jongizizwe Mayekiso; 21 October 1948 (age 77); Transkei, Eastern Cape, South Africa
- Occupations: Trade union leader Community activist
- Organization(s): MAWU, NUMSA
- Title: Member of the National Assembly of South Africa
- Term: 1994–1996

Moses Jongizizwe Mayekiso (born 21 October 1948) was a South African trade union leader and a leading activist in the struggles against the apartheid regime during the 1980s. He became general secretary of the National Union of Metalworkers of South Africa and an elected member of the South African Parliament.

== Early life ==
Moses Mayekiso was born in Askeaton, Transkei, Eastern Cape. He attended high school until 1972 in Pondoland East. Mayekiso worked as a miner in Free State. In 1973 he obtained work at Toyota Marketing in Sandton, Johannesburg.

== Political activist ==
By 1979 Mayekiso had been elected as shop steward of the Metal and Allied Workers' Union (MAWU). He organised strike action for trade union recognition and was sacked from Toyota, along with other MAWU members. Mayekiso instead became a full-time organiser for MAWU in East Rand.

=== 1980s ===
In November 1984 he participated with the Transvaal Regional Stayaway Committee in a two-day strike. Mayekiso and four other committee members were arrested and charged under the Internal Security Act. The subversion charges against him were dropped in April 1985, marked by jubilant demonstrations and an hour-long rally in downtown Johanenesburg.

Mayekiso was elected chairman of the Alexandra Action Committee (AAC) in 1985. He saw himself as a 'workerist' and socialist, whose role was to prevent the 'populism' of the ANC from subduing the struggle. He is described as unusual for a trade union activist because he also took on the broader politics of township activism. He was the central figure in the Alexandra township uprising of 1986, which resulted from an attack by the security forces on a funeral in the township. Mayekiso and the AAC leadership were arrested and subjected to severe beatings. Metal workers went on strike in protest on 5 March 1986 and Mayekiso was released.

Mayekiso was appointed Secretary General of MAWU in May 1986. In June 1986 he was again arrested and put on trial for treason, subversion and sedition. He was elected as the general secretary of the new 130,000 member National Union of Metalworkers of South Africa (NUMSA) in May 1987 while still in prison. It was not until April 1989 that he was acquitted of the treason charges, alongside four other activists. The success was the result of a campaign in South Africa and internationally. Mayekiso's arrest had been recognised as a direct attack on the trade union movement and non-violent protest, with a guilty verdict resulting in all non-violent protest being seen as treasonable.

=== 1990s ===
Mayekiso joined the African National Congress (ANC) in 1990 and became a central committee member of the South African Communist Party (SACP). He was part of the welcoming committee for Nelson Mandela's 1990 release from Victor Verster prison.

He was elected to the South African Parliament in 1994 and served for two years before resigning in frustration at the lack of grass-roots connection.

== Sources ==
- Glenn Adler; Doris Suarez, eds. (1993). "International Labor Solidarity: The Campaign for Justic for Moses Mayekiso". Union Voices: Labor's Responses to Crisis. New York: State University of New York Press. ISBN 0-7914-1247-4.
- Belinda Bozzoli (2004). Theatres of Struggle and the End of Apartheid. Edinburgh University Press. ISBN 0-7486-1941-0.

Trade union offices
Preceded by Tembi Nabe	General Secretary of the Metal and Allied Workers' Union; 1986–1987	Succeeded by Union merged
Preceded by New position	General Secretary of the National Union of Metalworkers of South Africa; 1987–1993	Succeeded by Enoch Godongwana
