= Chris Stals =

South African economist (born 1934)

Christian Lodewyk Stals

Governor of the South African Reserve Bank
- In office August 1989 – August 1999
- Preceded by: Gerhard De Kock
- Succeeded by: Tito Mboweni

Personal details
- Born: 13 March 1934 (age 92) Germiston, Transvaal, Union of South Africa
- Citizenship: South African citizenship
- Education: University of Pretoria

Christian Lodewyk Stals, better known as Chris Stals (born 13 March 1934) was the seventh Governor of the South African Reserve Bank, serving from 8 August 1989 to 7 August 1999. He succeeded Gerhard de Kock who had died in office.

He obtained a BComm degree from the University of Pretoria

During his term, South Africa's constitutional arrangements were changed again. The Second Republic was superseded by the Third Republic. It was also during his term that South Africa returned to the Commonwealth of Nations. It was President Nelson Mandela who kept Stals in office. Stals was succeeded by Tito Mboweni.

Academic offices
Preceded by Anton Rupert	Chancellor of the University of Pretoria; 1992–2005	Succeeded by Wiseman Nkuhlu
