= Gill Marcus =

South African banker and politician (born 1949)

Governor of the South African Reserve Bank
- In office November 2009 – November 2014
- Preceded by: Tito Mboweni
- Succeeded by: Lesetja Kganyago

Personal details
- Born: 10 August 1949 (age 77) Johannesburg, Union of South Africa
- Education: University of South Africa

Gill Marcus (born 10 August 1949) is a South African banker and politician who served as Governor of the South African Reserve Bank from 2009 to 2014. She was the first and only woman and the ninth person to hold the position.

== Life and career ==
=== Early years ===
Marcus was born in Johannesburg, South Africa. Her grandparents were Jewish émigrés of Lithuanian-Jewish origins; both of her parents were born in South Africa.

=== Exile ===
Both her parents were anti-apartheid activists and members of the South African Communist Party (SACP). They went into exile in 1969, together with Gill, her two sisters and brother. She completed her degree by correspondence with the University of South Africa, with a BComm in Industrial Psychology in 1976. She joined the SACP and the African National Congress (ANC) in 1970 and began working for the exiled ANC's Department of Information and Publicity (DIP) in London, later becoming the DIP's deputy secretary.

=== Return ===
Marcus returned to South Africa in 1990 after the ANC was unbanned. She established the ANC's Information Department in 1990.

=== Politician and central banker ===
She was elected a Member of Parliament in 1994 and became Deputy Minister of Finance in the Government of National Unity of Nelson Mandela from 1996 to 1999, serving under Trevor Manuel. In 1999 she became Deputy Governor of the Reserve Bank under Tito Mboweni. She held the post for five years but left due to a personality clash with Mboweni.

She then held the Professorship of Leadership and Gender Studies at the Gordon Institute of Business Science, before going into business, initially as chairman of Western Areas mining company and later as non-executive director of Gold Fields. In 2007 she succeeded Danie Cronjé as chair of Absa Group and Absa Bank.

In July 2009, President Jacob Zuma announced that she would return to the Reserve Bank to succeed Mboweni as Governor. The appointment was welcomed by both economists and trade unionists.

She stepped down at the end of her five-year term in November 2014.
