= Gerard Rissik =

Gerard Rissik (21 February 1903 – 4 October 1979) was the fourth Governor of the South African Reserve Bank. His term of office was from 1 July 1962 to 30 June 1967. He was succeeded by Dr. Theunis Willem de Jongh.

== Career ==
Rissik joined the reserve bank on 3 March 1923 as junior clerk. He would enrol at the Transvaal University College and obtained a Bachelor of Commerce in 1926. While completing his degree he completed the Institute of Bankers exam in 1925 obtaining a banking diploma. To facilitate his career further Rissik passed his Chartered Institute of Secretaries exams and an auditing course from the University of South Africa.

In 1933, he has promoted to Audit Clerk and then in 1939, Assistant Secretary. Rissik became the Reserve Bank's Chief Accountant and Secretary in 1943 and in 1954, its Chief Cashier. He was appointed executive assistant to the governor in 1958 before being appointed a deputy governor in 1960.

On 1 July 1962 he was appointed governor of the bank until his retirement in 1967. Other positions held during his career include secretary of the National Finance Corporation and chairman of the South African Bank Note Company.

== Marriage ==
Rissik married Alice Meltzer in December 1931 and had two sons.
