= June-Rose Nala =

South African trade unionist and academic

June-Rose Nala is a former South African trade unionist and academic.

Born in Durban, Nala worked at the Frame Group textile mill as a weaver. She became active in the wave of strikes in 1973, as the Durban Moment developed. In September, the National Union of Textile Workers was established, and Nala was elected to its executive.

In 1975, Nala was elected as secretary of the Natal Benefit Fund. The Government of South Africa believed that she was involved in instigating strikes at the Natal Cotton and Woollen Mills, and in May 1976 both she and Obed Zuma were arrested and detained. However, they were both released without charge in December.

On release, Nala was elected as general secretary of the Metal and Allied Workers' Union (MAWU). She held the position until 1984, when she travelled to England, to study at Ruskin College. She returned to South Africa by 1989, when she became a lecturer at the University of Natal. In this role, she founded the Workers' College, which in 1999 became formally linked with the university.

In 2007, Nala spoke at the congress of the National Union of Metalworkers of South Africa, the successor of MAWU.

Trade union offices
| Preceded by Alpheus Mthethwa | General Secretary of the Metal and Allied Workers' Union; 1976–1984 | Succeeded by Tembi Nabe |
