= The Hands of Che Guevara =

2006 film by Peter de Kock

- Directed by: Peter de Kock
- Release date: May 2006
- Country: Netherlands
- Language: Dutch

The Hands of Che Guevara (Dutch: De handen van Che Guevara; Spanish: Las manos de Che Guevara) is a 2006 documentary film made by Dutch film director Peter de Kock. The documentary is a search for the severed hands of the Latin American guerrilla fighter Ernesto Che Guevara.

After Guevara's execution in Bolivia in 1967, his hands were severed from his body for purposes of identification. After fingerprints were taken, the hands, and Guevara's body, disappeared. In 1997 the body was found buried under a landing strip in Vallegrande, Bolivia. Guevara's hands were not found in the grave, and it is not clear what became of them after his death, although some accounts indicate they were sent to Cuba by Antonio Arguedas.

The film attempts to answer the question of their location.

There is also a book of the same title. It is called Las Manos de Guevara (The Hands of Che Guevara), written by Evgenii Dolmatovskii. It was published in 1974 by Planeta.
