= Tito Mboweni =

South African politician (1959–2024)

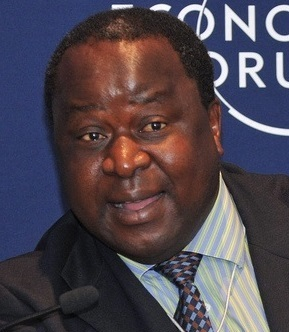
- Mboweni in 2011

Minister of Finance
- In office 9 October 2018 – 5 August 2021
- President: Cyril Ramaphosa
- Deputy: David Masondo
- Preceded by: Nhlanhla Nene
- Succeeded by: Enoch Godongwana

Governor of the South African Reserve Bank
- In office 8 August 1999 – 8 November 2009
- Preceded by: Chris Stals
- Succeeded by: Gill Marcus

Minister of Labour
- In office 1994–1999
- President: Nelson Mandela

Personal details
- Born: Tito Titus Mboweni; 16 March 1959 Tzaneen, Transvaal, Union of South Africa
- Died: 12 October 2024 (aged 65) Johannesburg, Gauteng, South Africa
- Citizenship: South African
- Children: 3
- Education: National University of Lesotho; University of East Anglia

Tito Titus Mboweni (16 March 1959 – 12 October 2024) was a South African politician who served as Minister of Finance of South Africa in the government of President Cyril Ramaphosa from 2018 to 2021.

Mboweni was the eighth Governor of the South African Reserve Bank and the first Black South African to hold the post from 1999 to 2009. He was sworn in as Minister of Finance on 9 October 2018, following Nhlanhla Nene's resignation.

Mboweni was a founding member of Mboweni Brothers Investment Holdings and a former international advisor of Goldman Sachs International. He had been appointed a non executive Director for South Africa at the New Development Bank (BRICS Development Bank).

== Early life and career ==
The youngest of three children, Tito Mboweni was born on 16 March 1959. He grew up in Tzaneen in the Limpopo Province. He attended the University of the North between 1979 and 1980, where he registered for a Bachelor of Commerce degree. He did not complete his studies there and left South Africa to go into exile in 1980.

While in exile in Lesotho, Mboweni joined the African National Congress (ANC), South Africa's current governing party, and was an activist for the party in many capacities. He obtained a Bachelor of Arts (Hons) in economics and political science from the National University of Lesotho in 1985. In 1988 he obtained a Master of Arts in Development Economics from the University of East Anglia in England.

== Political career ==
Prior to his appointment as Minister of Labour, Mboweni was Deputy Head of the Department of Economic Policy in the ANC. He also represented the ANC on several domestic and international platforms. Mboweni was a member of the ANC's National Executive and National Working Committees and was also Chairperson of the National Executive Committee's Economic Transformation Committee, which coordinated the development of ANC economic policies.

Mboweni served as Minister of Labour from May 1994 to July 1998 in South African President Nelson Mandela's cabinet. While Minister of Labour Mboweni was the architect of South Africa's post-Apartheid labour legislation, which allowed for collective bargaining and the establishment of labour courts. He became one of the World Economic Forums Global Leaders of Tomorrow in 1995.

In 1997, Mboweni was appointed head of the ANC's Policy Department which was responsible for managing ANC policy processes. Upon joining the South African Reserve Bank, he resigned all of his elected and appointed positions in the ANC.

Mboweni joined the South African Reserve Bank in July 1998 as the first black Advisor to the Governor. On 8 August 1999, he succeeded Chris Stals as Governor of the Reserve Bank. As governor, he oversaw the launch of the inflation targeting policy to help the bank achieve price stability and dealt with the rand's plunge due to global and local events.

During his tenure, Mboweni was appointed honorary Professor of Economics at the University of South Africa for 2000 to 2003. The Governor was also elected Chancellor of the University of the North-West and was installed as Chancellor on 23 February 2002. The University of Stellenbosch appointed the Governor Professor Extraordinary in Economics for the period 1 April 2002 to 31 March 2005.

== Career in the private sector ==
In June 2010, Mboweni was appointed an International Adviser of Goldman Sachs International, where he provided strategic advice to the firm on business development opportunities, with a particular focus on South Africa and Sub-Saharan Africa. He also served as chairman of bullion producer AngloGold Ashanti, among other company directorships.

== Minister of Finance, 2018–2021 ==
On 9 October 2018, Mboweni was announced by President Cyril Ramaphosa as the new Minister of Finance of the Republic of South Africa with immediate effect following Nhlanhla Nene's resignation. From the beginning of his tenure Mboweni often found himself at odds with the ruling ANC policy and ideology. The ruling ANC has always inclined itself towards socialist policies, a stance which has been viewed as a form of appeasing its alliance partners, the South African Communist Party and COSATU. On the other hand, Mboweni continuously proffered liberal solutions such as his 2019 economic recovery growth plan which was rejected by SACP and COSATU.

His economic growth plan was widely criticised in the Public Sector. In an opinion piece, Telkom Group CEO Sipho Maseko slammed Mboweni's proposed reforms for the ICT sector, particularly plans related to the rollout of spectrum, as being "ill-thought-out". However the response was different in the private sector, CEO of Bridgement Daniel Goldberg during his Sage tour to Cape Town, Johannesburg, and Durban hailed the plan, saying "it will improve the rate at which big state owned enterprises pays its suppliers consequently increasing efficiency in the economy. Phumlani Majozi in his opinion piece on Finance 24 argued that "Mboweni's ideas on how to revamp this economy, presented in his recent paper, titled "Economic Transformation, Inclusive Growth and Competitiveness: Towards an Economic Strategy for South Africa", are what will get this country back on track."

In June 2020, Mboweni proposed a new austerity policy, to cut the state's wage bill of R160.2 billion over three years and to adopt a Zero-based budget system in order to avoid a sovereign debt crisis in 2024.

On 5 August 2021, Mboweni resigned as finance minister. He was succeeded in the post by Enoch Godongwana.

== Joining the private sector ==
On 31 January 2022, Mboweni resigned as an ANC Member of the National Assembly to take up a position in the private sector. He was appointed chairman and independent non-executive director of Accelerate, a property fund company.

== Other activities ==
- World Bank, Ex-Officio Member of the Board of Governors (2018–2021)
- Joint World Bank-IMF Development Committee, Member (2018–2021)
- Asia School of Business, Member of the Board of Governors (2015-2024)

== Controversy ==
In January 2020, Mboweni became the first member of a South African cabinet since the end of apartheid to propose that South Africa and Lesotho be united as a federal state. Reactions to this proposal in both countries were partly negative and partly positive.

In August 2020, President Cyril Ramaphosa "strongly reprimanded" Mboweni over comments he made on Twitter about the dismissal of the Bank of Zambia’s governor Denny Kalyalya. In a statement, the presidency explained that "in one of his tweets, Minister Mboweni is promising to mobilise if not given reasons why the Central (bank) Governor has been fired," citing the need for central bank independence.

== Death ==
Mboweni died following a short illness at a hospital in Johannesburg, on 12 October 2024. He was 65.

== Recognition ==
- 2015 – Honorary professor, School of Economic and Business Sciences at the University of the Witwatersrand
- 2001 – Honorary Doctorate of Economics, University of Natal

== In popular culture ==
In 2017, he was the subject of a song by South African rapper Cassper Nyovest in which Tito Mboweni's name is included 75 times in the 4-minute song, with his name invoked to refer to the creation and ownership of money as his signature is included on the Rand note.

Political offices
Preceded by Nhlanhla Nene	Minister of Finance; 2018–2021	Succeeded by Enoch Godongwana
