= André de Wet =

South African rugby union player and politician

- Full name: André Eloff de Wet
- Born: 1 August 1946 (age 80) Kokstad, South Africa
- Height: 1.95 m (6 ft 5 in)
- Weight: 101.3 kg (223 lb)
- School: Selborne College
- University: Stellenbosch University

Rugby union career
- Position: Lock
Provincial / State sides
Years	Team	Apps	(Points)
- Western Province
- Border
International career
Years	Team	Apps	(Points)
1969	South Africa	3	(0)

André Eloff de Wet (born 1 August 1946) is a South African former international rugby union player.

Born in Kokstad, de Wet represented Border Schools while attending Selborne College and played rugby for Stellenbosch University, from where he was selected to a Southern Universities XV. He made his representative debut for Western Province in 1967 and two years later gained Springboks selection for a home series against the Wallabies, appearing as a lock in two Test matches. As a member of the 1969–70 Springboks tour, de Wet made a further Test appearance against England at Twickenham. He later competed for Border.

Post rugby, de Wet served in both the House of Assembly and Eastern Cape Provincial Legislature.

== See also ==
- List of South Africa national rugby union players
