= Theunis Willem de Jongh =

Theunis Willem de Jongh was the fifth Governor of the South African Reserve Bank. His term of office was from 1 July 1967 to 31 December 1980. He was succeeded by Gerhard de Kock.
