= Metal and Allied Workers' Union =

Trade union in South Africa

Logo of the union

The Metal and Allied Workers' Union (MAWU) was a trade union representing workers in metalworking, engineering and related industries in South Africa.

The union was founded in April 1974 in Pietermaritzburg, with the assistance of the General Factory Workers' Benefit Fund. It admitted all workers, regardless of ethnicity, and so was unable to apply for official recognition. By the end of the year, it also had a branch in Durban, and from 1975 it was active in the Transvaal. However, it remained small, with 6,500 members in 1974, of whom only one third were fully paid up.

The union refused to participate in wage or liaison committees, instead fighting for recognition at the company level. It was admitted to the International Metalworkers' Federation. It began working closely with the National Union of Motor Assembly and Rubber Workers of South Africa and the United Automobile, Rubber and Allied Workers Union, and in 1979 they and other unions formed the Federation of South African Trade Unions.

By 1980, the union had 8,400 members, and it continued to grow. However, in 1983, some dissatisfied members left, to form the rival United Metal, Mining and Allied Workers of South Africa (UMMAWOSA).

In 1985, the union led a strike at Sarmcol in Mpophomeni, leading to 970 workers being sacked. Four members of the shop stewards' committee were abducted, and three of them were murdered, the other surviving a gunshot wound. The union achieved a compromise, with it gaining access to workers at the plant, but not official recognition.

In 1985, MAWU transferred to the new Congress of South African Trade Unions. In 1987, it merged with the Motor Industry Combined Workers' Union, the National Automobile and Allied Workers' Union and UMMAWOSA to form the National Union of Metalworkers of South Africa.

== General Secretaries ==
1974: Alpheus Mthethwa
1976: June-Rose Nala
1984: Tembi Nabe
1986: Moses Mayekiso
