= Gerhard de Kock =

South African politician (1926-1989)

Dr. Gerhardus Petrus Christiaan de Kock

Governor of the South African Reserve Bank
- In office 1 January 1981 – 7 August 1989
- Preceded by: Theunis Willem de Jongh
- Succeeded by: Chris Stals

Personal details
- Born: 14 February 1926 Cape Town, South Africa
- Died: 7 August 1989 (aged 63) Pretoria, South Africa

Dr. Gerhardus Petrus Christiaan de Kock better known as Gerhard de Kock (14 February 1926 – 7 August 1989) was the sixth Governor of the South African Reserve Bank. He was the son of Dr. M.H. de Kock, who was the third Governor of the South African Reserve Bank. South Africa's constitutional arrangements were changed during his term in office. The 1st Republic was superseded by the 2nd Republic in late 1984. Dr. de Kock was the first (and only) Governor of the South African Reserve Bank to die in office. His term was from 1 January 1981 until his death on 7 August 1989. He was succeeded by Dr. Chris Stals.

As early as 1951 Dr Gerhardus de Kock was engaged by the Reserve Bank to do specialised research on a part-time basis. At the end of 1955 he joined the Bank as an economist. Shortly after his appointment at the Bank he was chosen to represent the Bank at the first course presented by the Bank of England for foreign bank officials in London. As from 1 July 1962 the position held by Dr De Kock was changed to Economic Adviser and on 1 January 1964 he was appointed Head: Economics Department. In 1967 the status of his post was upgraded and he started to attend the meetings of the Board of Directors. In May 1966 he was seconded to the Treasury as a Special Economic Adviser for 14 months. He finally left the Economics Department towards the middle of 1968 when he was appointed Alternate Executive Director of the International Monetary Fund in Washington, D.C., as the representative of South Africa, Australia, New Zealand, Lesotho and Swaziland, a position which he held with distinction up to the middle of 1971.

On his return to South Africa, Dr. de Kock was appointed as a Deputy Governor of the Reserve Bank with effect from 1 July 1971 and then to Senior Deputy Governor on 1 July 1976. In 1977 Dr. De Kock was seconded to the Ministry of Finance as a Special Economic Adviser. He was also appointed during this period as the Chairman of the Commission of Inquiry into the Monetary System and Monetary Policy in South Africa. This commission eventually became known as the De Kock Commission. The final phase in Dr. De Kock’s career began when he succeeded Dr. T. W. de Jongh as Reserve Bank Governor, a position he held until his death in August 1989.

Dr. de Kock also served as a Director and later as Chairman of the National Finance Corporation and its "successor" the Corporation for Public Deposits. Other positions occupied by him included that of Alternate Governor (later Governor) for South Africa on the Board of the International Bank for Reconstruction and Development (World Bank), Governor for South Africa on the Board of the Development Bank for Southern Africa, member of the Committee of Twenty and member of the Prime Minister’s Economic Advisory Council. Dr De Kock played an important role in professional bodies through active participation and delivering lectures. In 1980 and 1981 he was the President of the Economic Society of South Africa and also served one term as President of the Institute of Bankers in South Africa.

Honorary doctorates and awards received / bestowed on Dr de Kock included the following:

- 1982 - D.Econ. (University of Natal)
- 1983 - Stals Prize for Economics - (SA Akademie vir Wetenskap en Kuns)
- 1987 - D. Com. (University of Port Elizabeth)
- 1988 - D.Com. (University of Pretoria & Potchefstroom University for CHE)
- 1990 - Frans du Toit Medal - (SA Akademie vir Wetenskap en Kuns)

Other distinctions included his election as an honorary Fellow of the Institute of Bankers in South Africa in 1984 and his election by Euromoney magazine as "Central Banker of the Year" in 1988. After his death the University of Pretoria instituted the Gerhard de Kock Memorial Lecture, which was delivered annually by a prominent personality in the field of central banking.

A bronze bust of Dr de Kock by the sculptor Jo Roos remains to this day (recently removed due to mega renovations happening in the reserve bank), to the entrance of the Gerhard de Kock Auditorium in the Head Office Building of the Reserve Bank.
