= Lesetja Kganyago =

South African banker (born 1965)

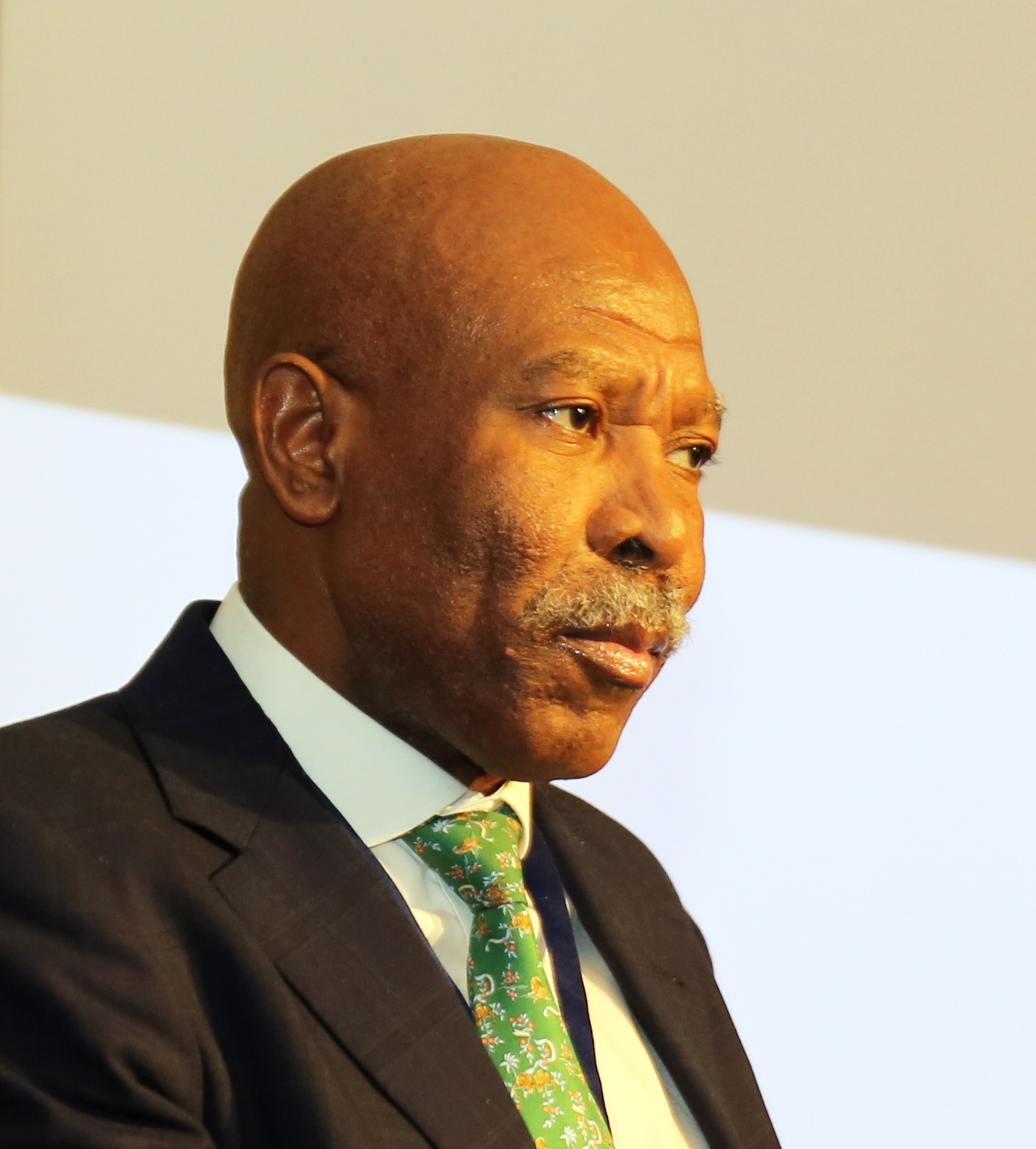

Governor of the South African Reserve Bank
- Incumbent
- Assumed office 9 November 2014
- Preceded by: Gill Marcus

Personal details
- Born: 7 October 1965 (age 61) Moletije, South Africa
- Spouse: Zibusiso Kganyago
- Relations: Ntopile Kganyago (uncle)
- Education: University of South Africa (BCom); SOAS, University of London (MSc)

Lesetja Kganyago (born 7 October 1965) is a South African economist and central banker. He is the Governor of the South African Reserve Bank (SARB), having assumed the position on 9 November 2014, following the expiry of the term of his predecessor, Gill Marcus.

In 2025, Kganyago was announced as the new Chancellor of Stellenbosch University, following the end of Justice Edwin Cameron's term.

== Background and education ==
Kganyago was born in Ga Maribana, Moletjie, Limpopo on 7 October 1965. He moved to Johannesburg with his mother, at the age of 18. He matriculated from Pax College (Brothers of Charity in Polokwane). For several semesters, he attended University of the Witwatersrand, but left before graduating.

He completed his studies at the University of South Africa, in 1991, earning the degree of Bachelor of Commerce (BCom) in Accounting and Economics. He also holds the degree of Master of Science in Development Economics from SOAS, University of London, obtained in 1994.

Kganyago also holds numerous certificates, and diplomas in management, economics and finance from Internationally recognized institutions, including the Wits Business School and Harvard University.

== Career ==
Beginning in 1996 until 1998, Kganyago served as the Director of the South African National Treasury. From 1998 until January 2004, he served as the Chief Director: Liability of the National Treasury. From January 2005 until May 2011, he was the Director-General of the National Treasury of South Africa.

In 2011, Kganyago was appointed Deputy Governor of the South African Reserve Bank, serving in that capacity from May 2011 until November 2014. Two other individuals served concurrently with him, at Deputy Governor level. On 9 November 2014, he became Governor of the South African Reserve Bank, replacing former Governor, Gill Marcus.

From 2018 until 2020, Kganyago chaired the International Monetary and Financial Committee (IMFC), the policy advisory committee of the Board of Governors of the International Monetary Fund (IMF).

In 2019, President Cyril Ramaphosa re-appointed Kganyago for another five-year term. In March 2024, Ramaphosa re-appointed him to a third five-year term, effective 9 November 2024.

== Other activities ==
- International Monetary Fund (IMF), Chairman of the International Monetary and Financial Committee (since 2018)
- Financial Stability Board (FSB), Member of the Regional Consultative Group for Sub-Saharan Africa
- Association of African Central Bankers, Chairman
- Southern African Development Community (SADC), Chair of the Committee of Central Bank Governors

== Recognition ==
Kganyago received the 2018 Governor of the Year award at the 5th annual Central Banking Awards ceremony.

== See also ==
- South African Reserve Bank
- South African rand
- Banking in South Africa
