= Gerald de Kock =

South African cricket commentator

Gerald de Kock is a South African sports commentator specialising in cricket. Formerly media manager of the South African national cricket team, he is currently chief cricket presenter on SuperSport, having worked previously for the SABC.

As communications officer for the Proteas, De Kock's task was every day to monitor all that was said and written about the team in the global media. "During the game," he told Nagraj Gollapudi in 2004, "I have to gauge the pulse of the media box, and, based on the chief talk of the day, I warn the players about certain points. I don't tell them what to say; I just need to let them be aware of things."

De Kock also commentates for the Comrades Ultra Marathon annually
