= Peter de Kock =

Dutch cameraman, film producer and director

Peter de Kock is a Dutch cameraman, film producer and director. He studied at the Film academy in Amsterdam and worked as a director of photography on many films and documentaries. De Kock made his directorial debut with the film The Hands of Che Guevara, a documentary about the severed hands of the Latin American guerrilla fighter Ernesto Che Guevara that were put in a jar of formaldehyde and disappeared from public view. The film was a success at many international film festivals.

== Filmography ==
=== Cinematographer ===
- Loenatik (1997)
- Stephan Lorant, A man in pictures (1997)
- Kinky Friedman, Proud to be an asshole from el Paso (2001)
- Planet Kamagurka (2004)
- John Callahan, Touch me someplace I can feel (1990)

=== Director ===
- The Hands of Che Guevara (2006)
