= Michiel Hendrik de Kock =

South African Reserve Bank Governor (1898–1976)

Michiel Hendrik de Kock (29 January 1898, Malmesbury, Cape Colony —18 September 1976, Cape Town) was the third Governor of the South African Reserve Bank. His term of office was from 1 July 1945 to 30 June 1962. All South African banknotes issued during the reign of Queen Elizabeth II carry his signature. The Union of South Africa became the Republic of South Africa under the Constitution of the First Republic on 31 May 1961. His signature is also carried on the first issue of Rand banknotes, which were first issued on 14 February 1961. His successor was Dr. G. Rissik. His son, Dr. G.P.C. de Kock also served as a Governor of the South African Reserve Bank.
