= SciFest Africa =

SciFest Africa, a project of the Grahamstown Foundation, is South Africa’s national science Festival held annually in late March or early April in Grahamstown, Eastern Cape.

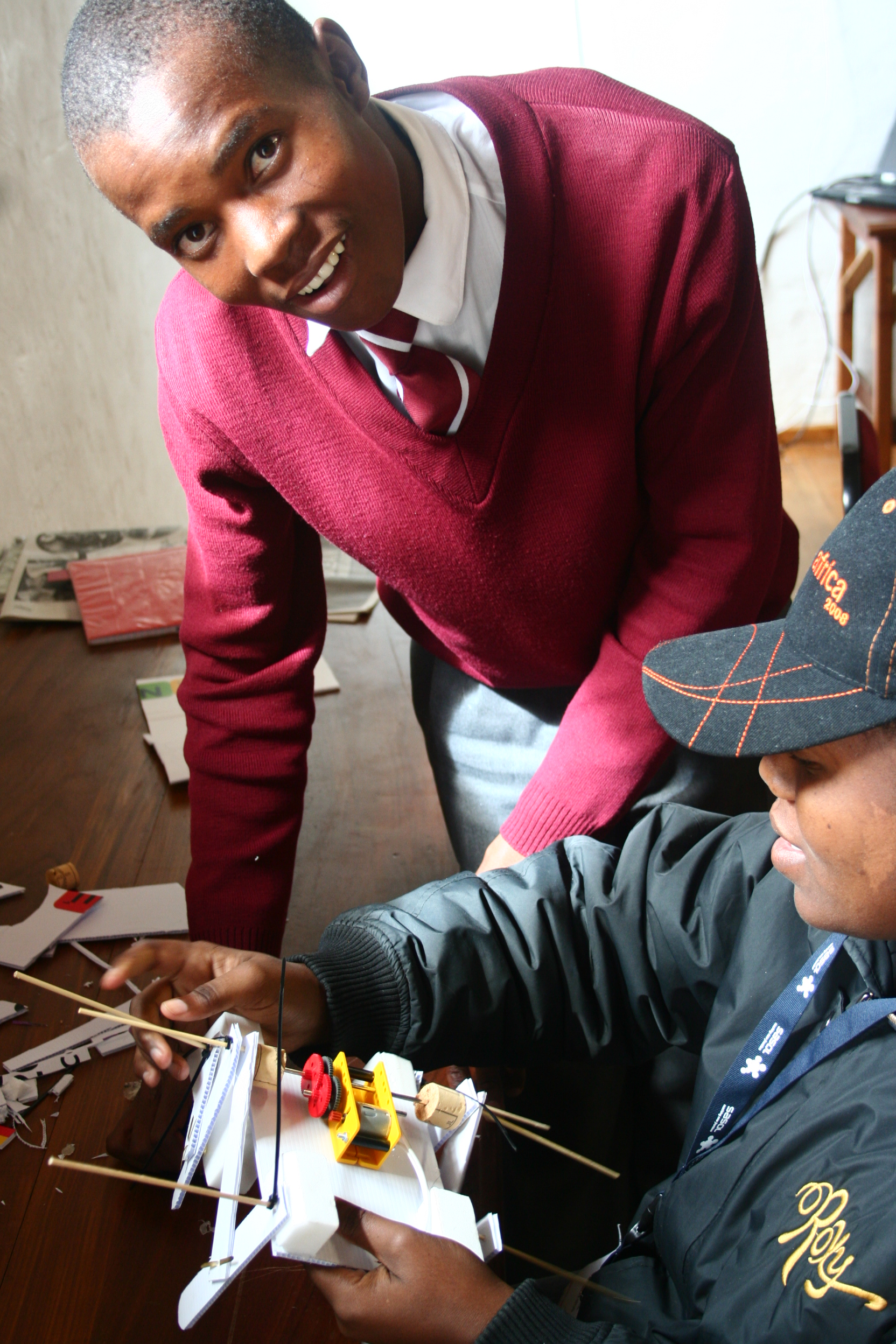
Two children during a robotics workshop, at Scifest 2008

The festival features over 600 events including lectures, interactive exhibitions, workshops, educational theatre, field trips, a soap box derby, laser shows, quizzes, science olympics, a film fest, science shows and tours. According to the festival organizers, about 58,000 visitors attended the 2008 festival.

The main aims of the festival, as stated by the organizers, is to break through popular misconceptions and create a new mindset about science, technology, engineering and mathematics by demonstrating that these disciplines underpin our everyday activities.

Scientists from several countries are invited to share their work, make science accessible to ordinary people, give career guidance, and act as role models for our youth.

== History ==
SciFest Africa was the first Festival of its kind on the African continent and was launched in 1997 as a high profile, national event to promote a culture of science in a festive way. It was modelled on the Edinburgh International Science Festival and was formerly known as Sasol SciFest but changed its name to SciFest Africa after the 2007 Festival.

== Other projects ==
When it isn't Festival time, the non-profit organization SciFest Africa concentrates on various other projects related to science, technology, engineering and maths in South Africa:

- SciFest-on-the-Road is the national outreach programme which aims to promote science across South Africa. A tour of one or more provinces over a two-week period ensures that more high school learners are exposed to the fun side of science. They have the opportunity to meet a top lecturer or to be edutained by a theatre production. This project has been running since 2000.
- Primary School outreach is the latest addition to SciFest Africa's projects. Aimed specifically at historically disadvantaged schools and younger learners, Primary School outreach hopes to ignite a spark in South Africa's young learners. Many of the areas visited do not have access to science or equipped science labs. Each learner is given a workbook of experiments which they can try out at home.
- Mall Shows are done by a team of university science students and done in shopping malls.
