= South African Reserve Bank =

Central Bank of South Africa

10 other official names: Suid-Afrikaanse Reserwebank (Afrikaans); iBulungelo-mali eliKhulu leSewula Afrika (Southern Ndebele); iBhanki enguVimba yoMzantsi Afrika (Xhosa); iBhange-ngodla laseNingizimu Afrika (Zulu); liBhangi lesiLulu leNingizimu Afrika (Swazi); Panka ya Resefe ya Afrika Borwa (Northern Sotho); Banka ya Sesiu ya Afrika Borwa (Sotho); Banka-kgolo ya Aforika Borwa (Tswana); Bangikulu ya Afrika-Dzonga (Tsonga); Bannga ya Vhukati ya Afurika Tshipembe (Venda)
- Central bank of: South Africa
- Headquarters: Pretoria, Gauteng, South Africa
- Coordinates: 25.7502°S 28.2591°E
- Established: 30 June 1921; 105 years ago
- Ownership: Private
- Governor: Lesetja Kganyago
- Currency: Rand; ZAR (ISO 4217)
- Reserves: US$77.76 billion (2026)
- Bank rate: 6.75%
- Preceded by: Bank of England
- Website: resbank.co.za
- South African Reserve Bank

Agency overview
- Jurisdiction: South Africa
- Child agency: Prudential Authority
- Key document: Currency and Bank Act of 10 August 1920

The South African Reserve Bank (SARB) is the central bank of South Africa. It was established in 1921, through the promulgation of the Currency and Bank Act of 10 August 1920. It was created as a direct result of the abnormal monetary and financial conditions which World War I had brought. The SARB was only the fourth central bank established outside the United Kingdom and Europe, the others being the Federal Reserve, Bank of Japan and Bank of Java.

The earliest suggestions for the establishment of the Central Bank in South Africa date back to 1879. A select committee, of ten members of Parliament, was established on 31 March 1920 to examine the benefits to the national interest of the establishing of the central bank.

Following on the recommendations of the committee, the South African Reserve Bank opened for business on 30 June 1921, making it the oldest central bank in Africa. The first banknotes were issued to the public by the Bank on 19 April 1922.

Unlike the Bank of England, which provided the model for establishing the SARB, the SARB is privately owned. The Bank of England was privately owned until 1946.

The SARB administers the Prudential Authority, the body responsible for prudential regulation in South Africa.

== Functions of the South African Reserve Bank ==
- Formulating and implementing monetary policy;
- Issuing banknotes and coins;
- Supervising the financial services sector;
- Ensuring the effective functioning of the national payment system (NPS);
- Managing official gold and foreign-exchange reserves;
- Acting as banker to the government – but not owned by South African Government.
- Administering the country's remaining exchange controls; and
- Acting as lender of last resort in exceptional circumstances.

== Organisational structure ==
=== Board of directors ===
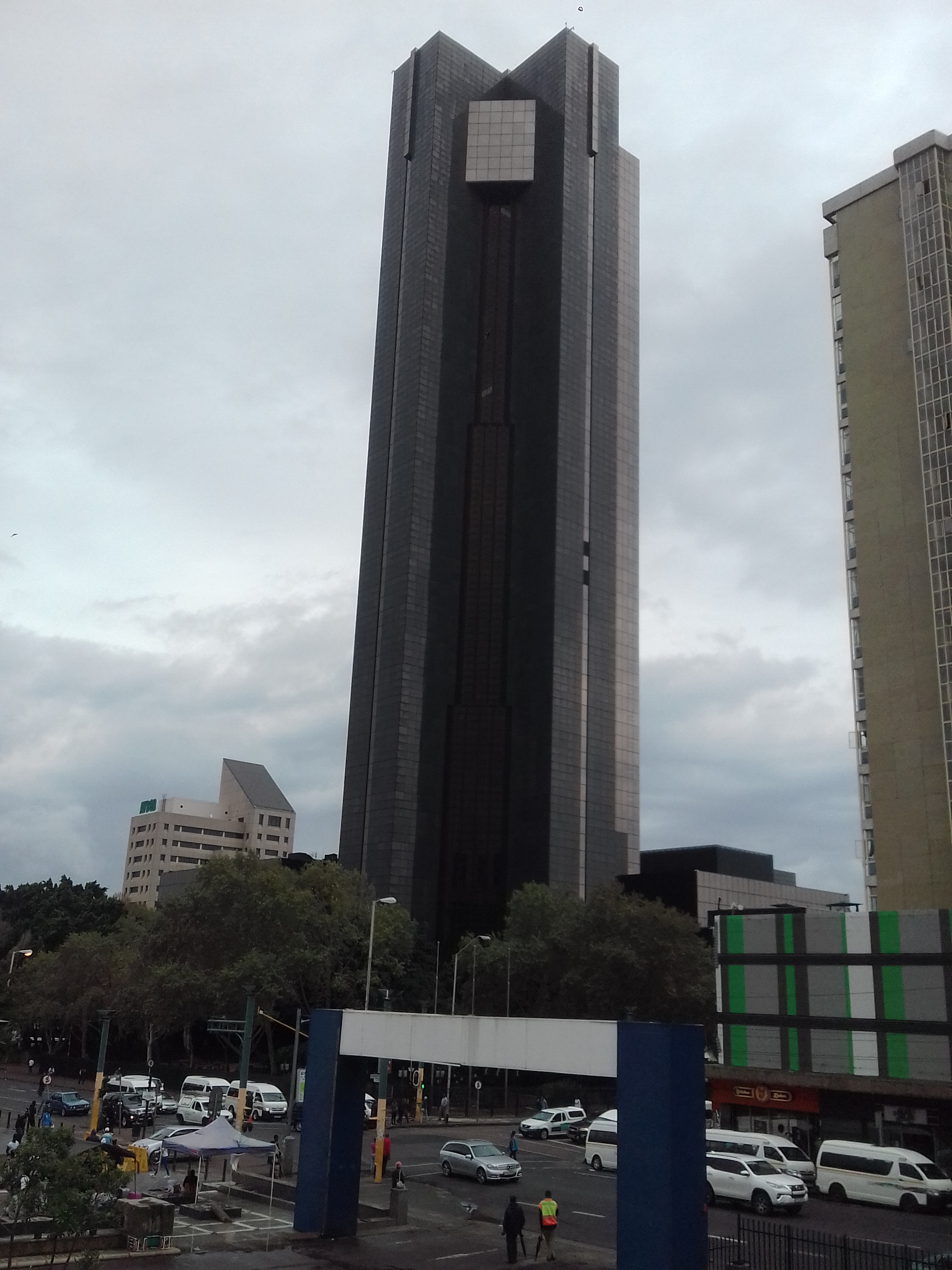
South African Reserve Bank head offices in Pretoria. The site is planned to be renovated, including the addition of a Reserve Bank museum.

SARB has a board of directors consisting of a Governor Lesetja Kganyago three Deputy Governors, and eleven Directors. The Governor, and Deputy governors are appointed for five-year terms by the President of South Africa in consultation with the Minister of Finance. Four of the directors are also appointed by the President for terms of three years. The remaining seven directors are appointed by the Shareholders of the Bank, also for a three-year term.

=== Ownership ===
The Reserve Bank, with 2 million issued shares, is one of eight reserve banks worldwide that have shareholders other than the governments of their respective countries (the others being Belgium, Greece, Italy, Japan, Switzerland, Türkiye and the United States).

The only limitation on shareholding is that no single shareholder may own more than 10,000 shares individually. Currently there are 696 shareholders, as of the shareholders index report of 31 August 2018, owning shares in the South African Reserve Bank.

Shareholders are entitled a dividend of not more than 10 South African cents per share per annum (the total maximum dividend is therefore 200,000 South African Rand or a maximum of 1,000 South African Rand for any individual shareholder), with the remaining profits being paid to the South African government.

The South African government has announced that it plans to nationalise the Reserve Bank.

=== Subsidiaries ===
On 1 April 2024, an arm of the South African Reserve Bank, the Corporation for Deposit Insurance (CODI), became operational; this is South Africa's deposit insurance scheme.

== List of governors of the South African Reserve Bank ==
- William Henry Clegg – December 1920 – December 1931
- Johannes Postmus – January 1932 – June 1945
- Michiel Hendrik de Kock – July 1945 – June 1962
- Gerhard Rissik – July 1962 – June 1967
- Theunis Willem de Jongh – July 1967 – December 1980
- Gerhard de Kock – January 1981 – August 1989
- Chris Stals – August 1989 – August 1999
- Tito Mboweni – August 1999 – November 2009
- Gill Marcus – November 2009 – November 2014
- Lesetja Kganyago – November 2014–

== See also ==
- Banking in South Africa
- South African pound
- South African rand
- BankservAfrica
- List of central banks of Africa
- List of central banks
- List of financial supervisory authorities by country
