= Mangaung African Cultural Festival =

- Genre: Jazz, afropop, fusion, rock, soul, R&B
- Dates: Annually in October
- Location: Bloemfontein
- Years active: 1997–present
- Founders: Free State Provincial Government
- Website: macufe.fssacr.gov.za

The Mangaung African Cultural Festival (MACUFE) is an annual showcase of African arts, culture and various sports disciplines that takes place in Bloemfontein, South Africa. It is one of the largest emerging festivals in Africa; it grew from having an audience of 30 000 in 1997 to 140 000 in 2015.

The festival runs for 10 days beginning on the first week of October each year in the Free State province of South Africa.

MACUFE consists of a main musical festival, an arts and crafts exhibition, theatre productions, a beauty pageant, the Sparta Macufe Cup which is a soccer tournament at the Free State stadium and performing arts. It also hosts an official corporate village where there are brand specific lounges, each with their own client service personnel.

== History ==
Even though the unfolding of an arts festival platform after 1994 in the New South Africa was a key development in SA professional theatre, numerous festivals did relatively little to explore and celebrate black South African culture, theatre or productions. Every festival had a small number of black artists taking part in productions, and audiences included a few black theatre-goers, but the participation of the white and Western-oriented producers, as well as audiences, outweighed the contribution from black African and historically put artists and festival-goers at a disadvantage. Apart from some exceptional cases, English and Afrikaans were used almost exclusively on the festival stages.

The festival was launched in 1997 by the Free State Provincial Government to celebrate the best local and international African artists in various disciplines. At the announcement of the festival in 1997 the general manager of SABC2, Thaninga Msimango, declared that “the concept was initiated because there was no cultural festival that expressed the rich culture of indigenous South Africans.” The Free State MEC for sports, arts and culture, M.W. Molefe, added that “most popular and successful festivals in South Africa are focused on Eurocentric culture, paying scant regard to indigenous African culture". Officially dubbed an “African cultural festival”, rather than an “arts festival”, the intention was clear: to stage an event that would recognise and celebrate indigenous African cultural heritage, and specifically as a balance to the other arts festivals which were perceived to do little in that regard.

== Events ==
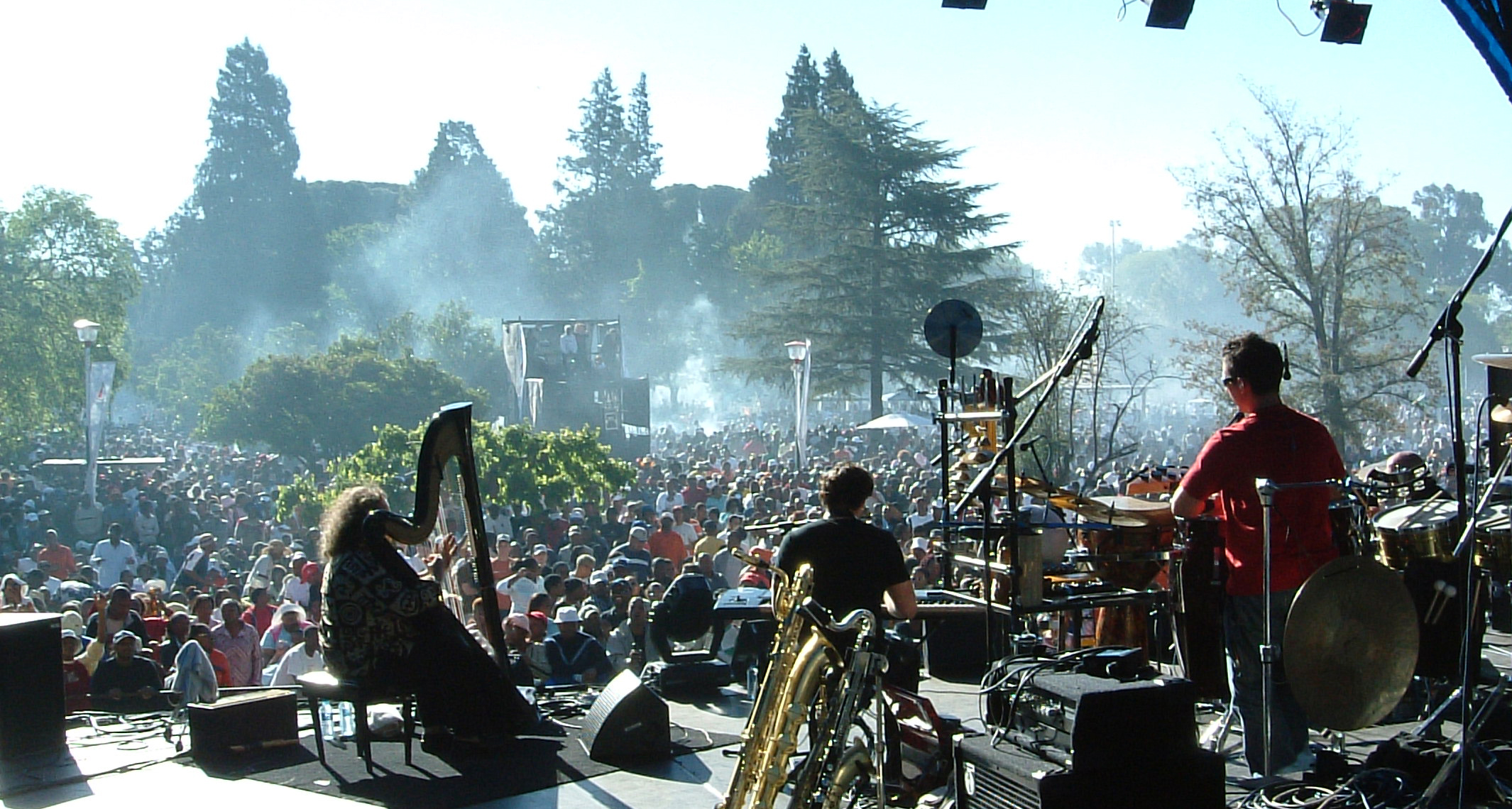
MACUFE Main Stage 2007

- Miss Glamorous Free State is a provincial beauty pageant that takes place during MACUFE. The pageant was established in 2014 under the Dipalesa Pitchov Foundation. Dipalesa Mbola represented the Free State in Miss South Africa 2014. The pageant is open to women between the ages 18 and 27 who seek to further their academic studies. The aim of the pageant is to empower the women with the means to attain their tertiary education.
- MACUFE Comedy Festival is a comedy show showcasing both the new and well established stand-up comedians of South Africa. The show takes place at The Dome, Old Greys in Bloemfontein and has had the likes of Trevor Noah, Loyiso Gola and Kagiso Lediga perform there.
- African Footprint is South Africa's longest running musical; it started showcasing in 1999. The multi-award winning musical takes place at the Civic Theatre. Produced by Richard Loring, the musical is slowly becoming an annual event at MACUFE.
- MACUFE Arts & Craft Market sees over 80 exhibitors showcasing, making and selling their various crafts. Their products include wire products, wool products, clothing, shoes, leather products and a multitude of beauty, health and home decor products. The market is held inside a marquee. There is also a food court with a beer garden, live music and cultural performances.
- MACUFE Gospel Concert takes place on the Sunday of the festival at The Dome, Old Greys in Bloemfontein. It brings together gospel artists all around South Africa for an entire day and night of praise and worship.
- Main Music Festival takes place at the King's Park Rose Garden, Bloemfontein. It is the highlight of the festival as it has both national and international artists taking the stage. It is the last musical event that takes place during MACUFE and has seen national artists such as Letta Mbulu, Caiphus Semenya, Zonke Dikana , Lira, and Mafikizolo take the stage. International artists who have performed at the main music festival include Maxwell, Angie Stone, Karyn White, Andy Narell, Randy Crawford, Bebe Winans and Joe Sample.
- Sparta MACUFE Cup is a soccer game that takes place at the Free State Stadium. It is the last event to take place during MACUFE. The game brings two teams in the Premier Soccer League to play against each other for the Sparta MACUFE cup. Bloemfontein Celtic F.C. were the reigning champions between 2012 and 2015; they were then beaten by Kaizer Chiefs F.C. in 2016 who currently hold the cup.

== Sponsors and media coverage ==
The Department of Arts and Culture and the Department of Sports, Arts, Culture and Recreation in Free State are some of the largest sponsors of the festival, spending a surplus of 20 million rand each year. Other sponsors include SA Express, Standard Bank, Vodacom and the National Lotteries Commission.

Lesedi FM radio, Daily Sun, Sunday Sun, The Sowetan, The New Age and The Africas News Network are amongst some of the largest known platforms that cover the festival. The SABC are also amongst the broadcasters at the festival.

== See also ==
- National Arts Festival
- Department of Arts and Culture (South Africa)
