= De Cock =

de Cock
Origin
- Origin: Dutch and Flemish
- Meaning: Derived from the Middle Dutch "kok, cok", meaning "cook"

De Cock or de Cock is a Dutch and Flemish surname. It may refer to:

- Helenius de Cock
- Hendrick de Cock, Dutch Church reformer
- Jan De Cock, Belgian artist
- Jan Claudius de Cock, Belgian painter, sculptor, and printmaker
- Jan Wellens de Cock
- Kevin De Cock
- Olivier De Cock
- Oscar De Cock
- Tom De Cock

== See also ==
- De-cock
