= ABSA =

ABSA may refer to:

- ABSA Aerolinhas Brasileiras S/A, doing business as LATAM Cargo Brasil, a cargo airline
- Absa Group, or absa, formerly Amalgamated Banks of South Africa, a multinational banking and financial services conglomerate
  - Absa Bank, a major commercial bank in South Africa and the flagship bank of Absa Group
  - Absa Bank Botswana
  - Absa Bank Ghana
  - Absa Bank Kenya
  - Absa Bank Mauritius
  - Absa Bank Mozambique
  - Absa Bank Seychelles Limited
  - Absa Bank Tanzania
  - Absa Bank Uganda Limited
  - Absa Bank Zambia
- African Baseball & Softball Association, now WBSC Africa
- American Biological Safety Association
- Association of British Secretaries in America
- Australian Bird Study Association
- Absa, a fictional character in Rivals of Aether
