= Mizinga Melu =

Zambian accountant and bank executive

- Born: Mazabuka, Zambia
- Citizenship: Zambia
- Education: University of Zambia (Bachelor of Arts); Henley Management College (Master of Business Administration)
- Occupation: Senior business executive
- Years active: 1994–present
- Known for: Business, management
- Title: Chief executive officer Absa Bank Zambia Plc
- Spouse: Chipepo Melu

Mizinga Melu is a Zambian businesswoman, accountant, and bank executive. She is the chief executive officer of Absa Bank Zambia Plc, effective February 2017, based in Lusaka.

Prior to her current assignment, she was the CEO of Barclays Africa Management, responsible for overseeing the "development of stakeholder relationships with governments, regulators, the Boards and customers" in the subsidiaries on the African Continent, outside of South Africa. All Barclays Africa Group managing directors, outside of South Africa, reported directly to her. She took office effective 1 October 2014. Prior to that, she was the managing director and CEO of National Bank of Commerce (Tanzania). She was appointed to that position in March 2013, and assumed office on 20 May 2013. Before that, she was the managing director and CEO of Standard Chartered Bank Zambia, from January 2008 until May 2013. In 2020, she was awarded CEO of the year by Global Banking and Finance Review. In January 2021, she released a book she wrote titled "Braving the Odds". It was a bestseller on Amazon.

== Overview ==
Melu is the first Zambian and the first woman to hold the position of managing director and chief executive officer at Standard Chartered Bank Zambia and during her tenure, was the only female chief executive officer in the thirteen African countries where Standard Chartered Bank maintains subsidiaries.

== History ==
She was born on 17 March, in Mazabuka, Mazabuka District, in Zambia's Southern Province. She worked at Zambia National Commercial Bank in the late 1980s and early 1990s. In 1993, she joined Standard Chartered Bank and over the years worked at the bank's subsidiaries in different countries, including the following: Zambia, South Africa, Kenya, Tanzania, Uganda, the United States of America and the United Kingdom. Prior to becoming managing director and CEO at Standard Chartered Zambia, she was Global Head of Development Organizations at the bank's international headquarters in London, UK.

== Education ==
She attended Roma Girls Secondary School, graduating in 1985. After obtaining her first degree from the University of Zambia (UNZA), she obtained the degree of Master of Business Administration (MBA) from Henley Management College, of the University of Reading, in the United Kingdom.

== Awards ==
She has been the recipient of the following awards:

- 2022 Lab Awards by the OHNS
- 2022 Most influential African Woman Banker
- 2020 Southern African Women in Leadership Trailblazers Awards,
- 2019 Banking CEO of Year Zambia by International Business Magazine.
- 2017 Transformational Leadership Award.
- 2013 The All Africa Business Woman of the Year Award.
- 2013 CEO of the year across all industries by the Zambia Institute Chartered Accountants.
- 2013 Business Woman for the year by Africa Business Leaders Awards (AABLA).

== Other responsibilities ==
She is married to Chipepo Melu, an economist and real estate developer. Together they are the parents on one daughter, Ruthmary and one son, Matthew. Mrs. Melu also serves as chairperson of the Zambia Daily Mail.

== See also ==
- Tanzania Economy
- Barclays Africa
- Barclays Tanzania
- NBC Tanzania
- Tanzania Banks
- Banks in Africa
