= Arrie Rautenbach =

South African businessman and corporate executive

Arnold Rautenbach
- Born: 27 March 1965 (age 61); South Africa
- Education: North-West University; INSEAD
- Occupations: Businessman and Banker
- Years active: 1997 - present
- Title: Former Chief Executive Officer; Absa Group Limited
- Term: 2022 - 15 October 2024
- Predecessor: Jason Quinn

Arnold Rautenbach (born 27 March 1965) was the chief executive officer (CEO), of Absa Group Limited, a financial services conglomerate, with headquarters in Johannesburg, South Africa, and subsidiaries in eleven sub-Saharan countries. Prior to being CEO, Rautenbach was the head of the bank group's retail and business banking (RBB) unit. He took over from Jason Quinn, who was the interim CEO of Absa Group from April 2021 to March 2022. Jason Quinn resumed his role as Absa Group's Financial Director. Rautenbach's tenure as Group CEO of Absa Group started on 29 March 2022 up to 15 October 2024.

== Background and education ==
Rautenbach is a South African national. He holds a Bachelor of Business Administration degree (BBA) and a Master of Business Administration degree (MBA), both awarded by North-West University, Potchefstroom Campus. He has also received specialized training in management from INSEAD.

== Career ==
At the time he became CEO of Absa Group, Rautenbach had over 25 years of banking experience. He joined Absa Group in the late 1990s, starting out at Bankfin. He has served in various roles, including as managing executive of distribution, managing executive of Absa Card Division and as chief executive of Retail and Business Banking.

== Other considerations ==
In his new role as CEO of Absa Group, Rautenbach sat on the boards of Absa Group Limited and Absa Bank Limited. He was the substantive CEO appointed to replace the last substantive Absa Group CEO, Daniel Mminele, who resigned on 20 April 2021.

Rautenbach's tenure as Group CEO, began a few days before a new group Chairperson, Sello Moloko, assumed office, replacing Wendy Lucas-Bull, who retired on 31 March 2022.

== See also ==
- Wendy Lucas-Bull
- Maria Ramos

Preceded by Jason Quinn (Interim)	Chief Executive Officer of Absa Group Limited; 2022- 15 October 2024	Succeeded by Charles Russon interim CEO
