= Jason Quinn (accountant) =

South African accountant and corporate executive

- Born: c. 1975 (age 50–51); South Africa
- Education: University of South Africa; University of KwaZulu-Natal; South African Institute of Chartered Accountants
- Occupations: Accountant and Banker
- Years active: 1993 - present
- Title: Chief Executive; Nedbank Group
- Term: 2024 - present
- Predecessor: Michael William Thomas Brown

Jason Quinn (born circa 1975) is the chief executive officer (CEO) designate of Nedbank Group. He previously was CEO in acting capacity, of Absa Group Limited, a financial services conglomerate, with headquarters in Johannesburg, South Africa, and subsidiaries in eleven sub-Saharan countries. Prior to his current assignment, Jason was the chief financial officer of Absa Group Limited. In addition, he has been a member of the board of directors of the financial services conglomerate, since September 2016.

== Background and education ==
Jason holds a bachelor's degree in business and commerce, awarded by the University of South Africa. He also holds a B.Comm (Honors) degree, awarded by the University of KwaZulu-Natal. In addition he is a Chartered Accountant (South Africa), recognized by the South African Institute of Chartered Accountants.

== Career ==
Jason spent 15 years at Ernst and Young, at their Johannesburg office. He made Partner there, before he left to join Absa in 2008. He was appointed Group Financial Controller at the bank, serving in that role for four years.

Between 2012 and 2016, he served, first as the CFO of Retail and Business Banking, and then as Head of Finance, at Barclays Africa Group, spending about equal time at each position.

In September 2016, Jason Quinn joined the board of Absa Group Limited and was appointed Group Financial Director. He is a member of a number of board sub-committees.

In April 2021, he was appointed as interim chief executive officer at Absa Group Limited, replacing Daniel Mminele, who resigned and left the bank.

== Other considerations ==
In addition to the Absa Group board, Jason Quinn sits on the boards of Absa Financial Services and Woolworths Financial Services. He is also an employer-appointed Trustee of the Absa Pension Fund.

== See also ==
- Wendy Lucas-Bull
- Maria Ramos
- Daniel Mminele

Preceded by Daniel Mminele	Chief Executive Officer of Absa Group Limited; 2021-2022	Succeeded by Arrie Rautenbach
