= Sello Moloko =

South African businessman and corporate executive

- Born: 6 July 1965 (age 61); Soweto, South Africa
- Education: University of Leicester (Bachelor of Science in Mathematics) (Postgraduate Certificate in Education); Wharton School of the University of Pennsylvania (Advanced Management Program)
- Occupations: Businessman, Banker & Corporate Executive
- Years active: since 1992
- Title: Chairman, Absa Group; Chairman, Telkom
- Spouse: Keneilwe Moloko

Matthews Sello Moloko (born 6 July 1965) is a South African businessman, banker and corporate executive, who served as group chairman of Absa Group, a large pan-African financial services group, with subsidiaries in Botswana, Ghana, Kenya, Mauritius, Mozambique, Seychelles, South Africa, Tanzania, Uganda and Zambia. He concurrently served as the chairman and non-executive director of Absa Bank Limited, the South African subsidiary and the largest of the subsidiary banks of the Absa Group. He began his tenure at Absa on 1 April 2022. He is also the chairman of Telkom, the South African telecommunications conglomerate, since March 2019. Mololo resigned from the banking group effective 15 July 2025 and was succeeded by René van Wyk.

== Background ==
Sello was born 6 July 1965 in Soweto, South Africa. He is the firstborn of four children. He holds a Bachelor of Science degree in Mathematics and a Postgraduate Certificate in Education, both obtained from the University of Leicester in the United Kingdom. He also successfully attended an Advanced Management Program, at the Wharton School of the University of Pennsylvania, in the United States.

== Career ==
Sello was appointed as a non-executive director of the Absa Group in October 2021, with his appointment effective 1 December 2021. At the same time, he was appointed as chairman-designate of both Absa Group Limited and Absa Bank Limited, effective 1 April 2022. He replaced Wendy Lucas-Bull, who retired as the bank group's chairperson after nine consecutive years in that position. On 15 July 2025, Sello Mokolo resigned from his leadership positions at Absa Group and handed over those responsibilities to René van Wyk.

Previous leadership positions in business include as co-founder and Executive Chairman of Thesele Group, an all-Black diversified investment company. His business experience spans over 30 years. He has served in the past as the CEO of Old Mutual Asset Managers. He has previously chaired the boards of diverse companies, including Alexander Forbes, Sibanye-Stillwater and General Reinsurance Africa. Sello also serves on the boards of M&G Investments and DG Capital. He is the former deputy CEO of Capital Alliance Asset Managers.

Sello is a Trustee of the University of Cape Town Foundation. He previously served as the president of the national Association of Black Securities and Investment Professionals (ABSIP).

== See also ==
- Arrie Rautenbach
- Simpiwe Tshabalala
