= Kihara Maina =

Kenyan corporate executive

- Born: 1969 (age 56–57); Kenya
- Education: Moi University (Bachelor of Science in Mathematics and Statistics); University of Chicago Booth School of Business (Master of Business Administration)
- Occupations: Businessman & Bank Executive
- Years active: 1993–present
- Title: Regional Chief Executive Officer; I&M Bank Group

Kihara Maina is a businessman and bank executive in Kenya. He is the Regional Chief Executive Officer at I&M Bank Group, an East African financial services conglomerate, active in Kenya, Tanzania, Rwanda, Uganda and Mauritius. He is based in Nairobi.

He took up his current position in 2023, while Gul Khan replaced him as I&M Bank Kenya, CEO. For the seven years before that, Kihara was the CEO and managing director of Barclays Bank Tanzania, based in Dar es Salaam.

== Background and education ==
He was born in Kenya circa 1969. After attending primary school locally, he enrolled in Alliance High School (Kenya), an all-boys middle and high school, located in Kikuyu, Kiambu County, Kenya. He graduated in 1987 with a High School Diploma in Mathematics, Physics and Chemistry.

His first degree, a Bachelor of Science in Mathematics and Statistics, was obtained from Moi University near Eldoret, Uasin Gishu County in 1991. His second degree, a Master of Business Administration, was awarded in 2009, by the University of Chicago Booth School of Business, in Chicago, Illinois, United States.

== Career ==
In 1993, Kihara was hired by Stanbic Bank Kenya Limited, today part of Stanbic Holdings Plc. Later he transferred to Barclays Bank of Kenya, today Absa Bank Kenya Plc. He served in various roles, rising to Head of Trading at the bank in 2001. In 2004 he was promoted to Regional Treasurer, East Africa, responsible for treasury functions at Barclays subsidiaries in Kenya, Tanzania and Uganda. In 2009, he was again promoted to managing director and chief executive officer of Barclays Bank of Tanzania, serving there until 2016. In May 2016, he was appointed as the CEO of I&M Bank Kenya.

== Other considerations ==
Kihara is a married father of two children, one son and one daughter.

== See also ==
- I&M Holdings Limited
- List of banks in Kenya
