= Bongiwe Gangeni =

South African pharmacist, banker and corporate executive

- Born: c. 1978 (age 47–48); South Africa
- Education: University of the Witwatersrand; University of Pretoria; Harvard University
- Occupations: Banker and Corporate Executive
- Years active: since 2000
- Known for: Professional competence
- Title: Designate Head of Consumer, Private & Business Banking (CPBB), Africa, Middle East and Europe, at Standard Chartered Bank.

Bongiwe Gangeni (born c. 1976) is a South African pharmacist, businesswoman and corporate executive, who is a designated corporate executive at Standard Chartered Bank, responsible for Africa, the Middle East and Europe. She starts her assignment in March 2022. She will be based in Dubai, in the United Arab Emirates.

Before that, she served as a member of the Absa Bank Limited Executive Committee, concurrently carrying the mantles of Deputy Chief Executive Officer for Retail and Business Banking, and of Head of Relationship Banking. She worked at Absa for fourteen years, based in Johannesburg, South Africa.

== Background and education ==
She was born in South Africa in the late 1970s. Bongiwe grew up in Thembisa, a northeastern suburb of Johannesburg. After attending local primary and secondary schools, she was admitted to the University of the Witwatersrand, where she obtained a Bachelor of Pharmacy degree. She then went on to obtain a postgraduate Diploma in Management from Wits Business School, the business school of the same university.

Her degree of Master of Business Administration was awarded by the Gordon Institute of Business Science, the business school of the University of Pretoria. Bongiwe also completed the Advanced Management Programme at Harvard Business School.

== Career ==
After her first degree, Bongiwe practiced as a pharmacist for a few years. The then found a job as a management consultant with Accenture, working there for two years.

She joined Absa Bank Limited in 2007, back when Barclays Africa Group was the majority shareholder. After one year in Johannesburg, she was seconded to London, United Kingdom at Barclays headquarters to undergo banking leadership training. Bongiwe returned to South Africa in 2009 and took on progressively increasing responsibility. At the time she left Absa, she was the Deputy CEO Retail and Business Banking at Absa Bank Limited.

== See also ==
- List of banks in South Africa
