= Imperial Bank =

Imperial Bank may refer to

- Canadian Imperial Bank of Commerce, one of the "Big Five" banks in Canada, once the Imperial Bank of Canada
- Imperial Bank of China, first Chinese-owned bank modelled on Western banking practice
- Imperial Bank of India, oldest and the largest commercial bank of the Indian subcontinent, now State Bank of India
- Imperial Bank of Persia, British-owned state bank
- Imperial, 1990s Russian commercial bank associated with Russian hydrocarbon firms including Gazprom
- Imperial Bank South Africa, commercial bank
- Imperial Bank Limited, commercial bank in Kenya
