= Banknotes of Volkskas Limited (South West Africa) =

Notes between 1949 and 1959

Banknotes were issued by Volkskas Limited between 1949 and 1959 from its Windhoek branch. The notes are quite scarce.

The notes are expressed in South West African pounds in Afrikaans, English, and in German.

== Catalogue ==
- P13a. 10 shillings. 1 June 1949; 4 June 1952. Blue on green and tan underprint.
- P13b. 10 shillings. 1 September 1958. Blue on green and tan underprint.
- P14a. 1 pound. 1 June 1949; 17 April 1951; 4 June 1952. Brown.
- P14b. 1 pound. 1 September 1958. Brown.
- P15a. 5 pounds. 1 June 1949; 4 June 1952. Brown.
- P15b. 5 pounds. 1 September 1958; 1 September 1959.
