= South West African banknote issuers =

South West Africa had banknotes issued at various times between 1916 and 1959 while under South African administration. The issues of 1916-18 are denominated in South West African marks. The later issues are denominated in South West African pounds.

== List of issuers of South West African mark-denominated notes ==
- Sonja Scholz, Windhoek.
- Gibeon Savings and Loans Association, Gibeon.
- Speisser and Silla, Windhoek.
- South West African Land Credit Association, Luderitz.
- Swakopmund Co-operative Bank, Swakopmund
- Swakopmund Bookshop, Swakopmund and Windhoek.
- Viktoria Pharmacy, Windhoek.
- Wecke and Voigts, Karabib, Okahandja, Swakopmund, and Windhoek.

== List of issuers of South West African pound-denominated notes ==
- Barclays Bank (Dominion, Colonial and Overseas)
- Standard Bank of South Africa Limited
- Volkskas Limited

== See also ==
- Commonwealth banknote-issuing institutions
