= Madeline Kimei =

Tanzanian legal expert and arbitrator

- Born: Madeline Kimei
- Occupation: Lawyer
- Known for: iResolve Platform
- Notable work: iResolve

Madeline Kimei is a Tanzanian legal expert, arbitrator and mediator practicing commercial and corporate law. She currently serves as President of the Tanzania Institute of Arbitrators (TIArb). She is considered the first woman in Tanzania to start an online platform dealing with dispute resolution called iResolve which she launched in 2015. She is specialized in providing corporate and commercial legal support, counsel for domestic and international arbitration, commercial mediation and dispute management specialist.

== Background history ==
Kimei pursued her LLB at Coventry University (UK) and LLM in law and finance from Bournemouth University(UK). She took the diploma in Legal Practice from then Law School of Tanzania and was enrolled to Mainland of Tanzania roll of Advocates in 2011. She is an ADR enthusiast and accredited as a Commercial Mediator by the Chartered Institute of Arbitrators -CIArb (UK). She also holds the certificate dispute management from India Institute of Arbitration and Mediation (IIAM). She has been a member of the Tanzania Institute of Arbitrators since 2011 and serves as the Vice Chair to the Institute since June 2016. She is well versed and familiar with the UNCITRAL Rules for Arbitration, the ICC Rules and TiArb Arbitration Rules.

== Work experience ==
Kimei previously worked as in-house general counsel for Stanbic Bank and National Bank of Commerce. She has a background in contract advisory and contract management, knowledge of the FIDIC claims management and dispute resolution. She advises on labor related disputes and corporate/commercial transactions. In 2015 Kimei was bestowed as a fellow of the China - Africa Legal Research Centre and a consultant for the China Research Centre for Legal Diplomacy, Legal Training Base and the FOCAC China Africa Legal Cooperation Forum.

She established a boutique corporate & dispute resolution firm and is currently the CEO responsible for the management, operations, strategy and business development of the company. She currently serves as a member of the governing council of the Tanganyika Law Society, vice chair of the Tanzania Institute of Arbitrators and board member for MMG Gold Limited. Kimei also served as the in-house counsel and company secretary to the boards of Stanbic Bank Tanzania (2010-2012) and National Bank of Commerce Ltd (2013-2015), guiding and advising the board on corporate governance related issues and legal matters. As a commercial mediator, her approach is results-oriented, both in terms of problem solving and in terms of party satisfaction. She focuses to create awareness of the use of alternative means to resolve disputes.
