= René van Wyk =

South African banking executive

- Education: University of Johannesburg; University of South Africa; INSEAD
- Occupation: Chartered accountant • Banker • Corporate Director
- Years active: 1993–present
- Employer(s): ABSA Group Limited; ABSA Bank Limited
- Board member of: Absa Group; Absa Bank; Motus Holdings

René van Wyk is a South African chartered accountant and banker. He was appointed independent non-executive chairperson of Absa Group Limited and Absa Bank Limited in July 2025. He previously served as the Registrar of Banks at the South African Reserve Bank and as interim Group Chief Executive Officer of Absa in 2019.

== Education ==
Van Wyk holds a Bachelor of Commerce degree from the University of Johannesburg and a Bachelor of Accounting Science (Honours) from the University of South Africa. He completed an Advanced Management Programme at INSEAD. He is also a registered Chartered Accountant (South Africa).

== Career ==
=== Early career ===
Van Wyk worked at KPMG as a partner in the financial services group in his early years. He later joined the Nedbank Group from 1993 to 2011, holding various positions including Executive Director responsible for risk at Nedcor Investment Bank, and Chief Executive Officer of Imperial Bank, a subsidiary of Nedbank.

=== South African Reserve Bank ===
Van Wyk was Registrar of Banks and Head of Banking Supervision at the South African Reserve Bank until his retirement in May 2016.

=== Absa Group and board roles ===
- Van Wyk first joined the Absa Group Board as an independent non-executive director on 1 February 2017.
- He served as an interim Group Chief Executive of the company from 1 March 2019 to 14 January 2020, following the departure of Maria Ramos.
- After a short break, he re-joined the board, again, as a non-executive director from 1 August 2020, and became an independent non-executive director from 1 August 2021.
- He was appointed as independent non-executive director of Absa Bank Limited on 1 February 2022.
- On 15 July 2025, Van Wyk was appointed Chairman of Absa Group and Absa Bank.
