= South West African pound =

Currency

The pound was the paper currency of South West Africa between the 1930s and 1959 by the Standard Bank of South Africa Limited, Barclays Bank (Dominion, Colonial and Overseas), and Volkskas Limited. These notes circulated along with the South African pound notes of the South African Reserve Bank until 1961, when they were withdrawn and replaced with rand notes only. The South West African pound was pegged at par with the South African pound, which had replaced the South West African mark in 1918.

== See also ==
- South West African banknote issuers
