= Kuru Dance and Music Festival =

Annual celebration in Botswana

The Kuru Dance and Music festival is an annual celebration included in the Botswana's calendar of events marking the full moon where Khoisan communities find it very significant in their culture to interchange cultural knowledge through song and dance.

== Background ==
The Kuru Dance and Music Festival was started in 1997 to celebrate khoisan or San culture among the Naro San at D'Kar in the Ghanzi District, Botswana to recognize the richness of San culture through song and dance. It was also meant to encourage pride in San cultural values, and art projects were developed as a larger cultural program that organizes an annual cultural festival well known in Botswana. The Festival also serves as an important and sacred healing function for San communities, as it is held every August with dates coinciding with the full moon. This festival is spearheaded by the Kuru Cultural Center with help from sponsors like Ministry of Youth, Gender, Sport and Cultures and Barclays Bank of Botswana,

== Custodians & stakeholders ==
There are organizations that have a special interest on the festival, they come together to plan and organize for the festival to be a success. Established in 1986 The Kuru Development Trust popularly known as the Kuru Family of Organizations, is a local San Non-governmental Organization that hosts the San music and dance festival, and facilitates economic self-reliance among the San. The Trust collaborates with the Working Group of Indigenous Minorities in Southern Africa (WI MSA)-A regional organization that facilitates the development of San Communities in the region; to assist marginalized communities in Botswana with establishment of self-sustainable community self-help organizations, which will increase the capacity of these communities to gain control over their social and economic lives and which will be able to define and implement the communities' own development. The Trust is run by a board of trustees whose membership is made up of 20% representatives of the founding body-church organizations in the Netherlands, and 80% of local San representatives from village development organizations.

This festival has over the years attracted support through sponsorship by local companies and organizations like Barclays Bank of Botswana and MYSC. Barclays sponsorship of the festival aligns perfectly with its strategic ambition to foster growth as a business and communities. The Bank has sponsored the festival since 2015, it supports the conservation of Botswana's dynamic heritage, as it encourages community trade and can ultimately drive development. MYSC is a default supporter of the festival as it was established by the government of Botswana to create an enabling environment for youth empowerment, sport development and preservation of culture and heritage in collaboration with relevant stakeholders to enhance unity and pride of people of Botswana.

== Types of dance ==
There are a number of dances performed during the festival. Different dances are performed to narrate the life story of the San people. These include hunting and gathering dances, rite of passage, puberty and courtship dances and the infamous trance healing dance.

=== Hunting and gathering dance ===
The San people naturally being hunters and gatherers they perform a dance to recognize this part of their identity. They perform the hunting and gathering dance to mark both the preparation of the coming hunting or gathering season and celebrating a kill after a successful hunting. Hunting dance can be performed to mark a young boy's successful first kill after an animal especially an antelope. He is secluded and later initiated by doing markings oh his arms, the eland fat is rubbed on the scars. Hunting dances are dramatic renditions of the hunt from spoor recognition to ultimately slaughtering the animal. They celebrate a successful hunt and pay reverent to the mother nature.

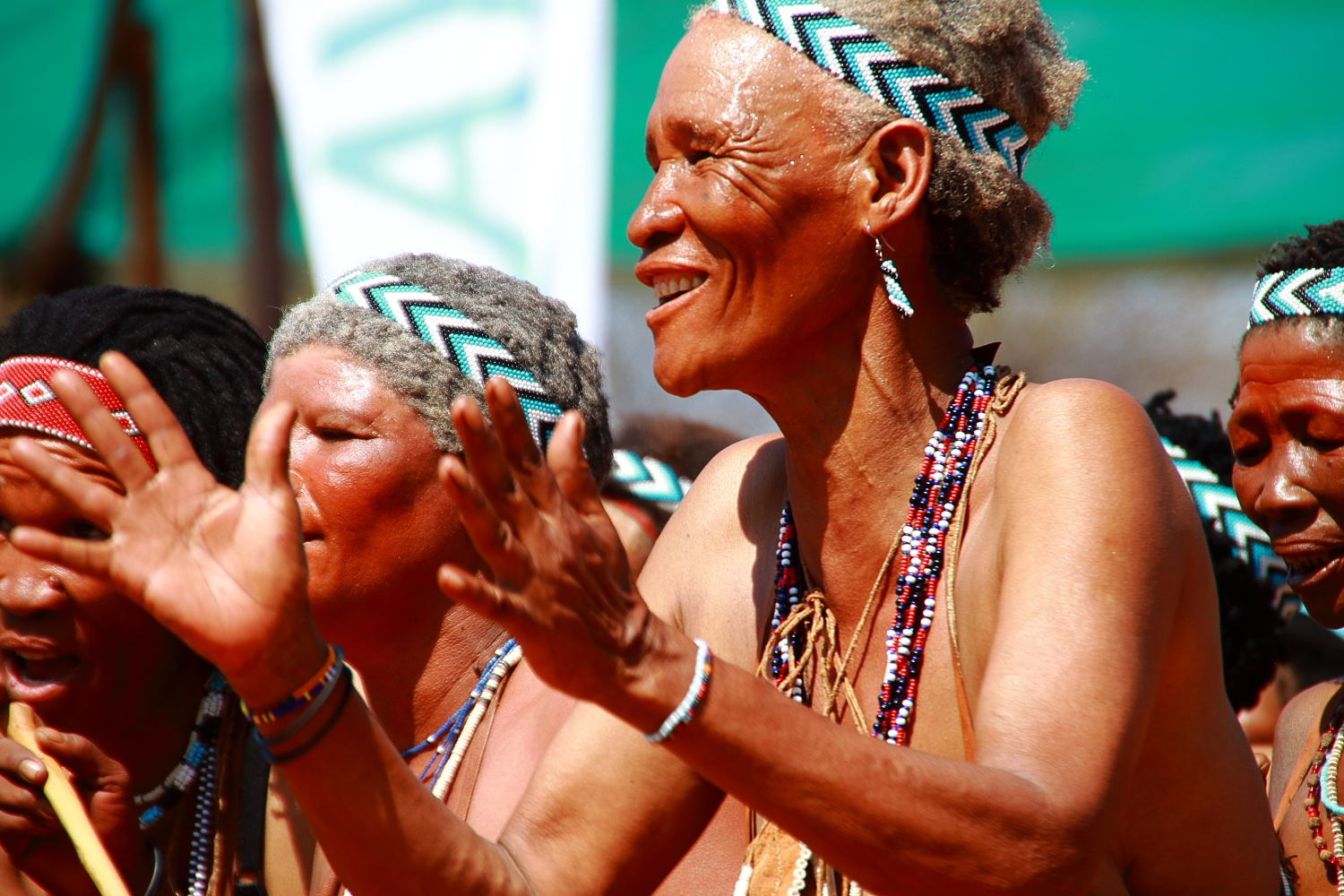
San women clapping and singing during a song and dance

Throughout the performance of this dance, female performers sits in a semi circle, orchestrating a backdrop of song, rhythmic clapping and sound percussion, while the men dramatize the hunting rite, invariably assuming the roles of hunter and prey. The males mimes the hunting of an animal such as a gemsbok, throughout the dance the hunters track the animal and stabs it with poisoned arrows. The mimed drama ends with an animal being slaughtered and women immediately prepare a feast to celebrate. At this point there is paced rhythmic hand-clapping and footsteps as they celebrate a successful hunt.

=== Rites of passage ===
As a young woman start experiencing puberty symptoms like menstrual cycle for the first time i said to be suffering from the "eland illness". The eland symbolizes femininity, fertility and good health. During this time she is secluded and ritually painted in red ochre, wood ash and charcoal, mixed together with animal fat and plant pigment. A rites of passage dance is performed to welcome a young woman into adulthood and marriage. Puberty dances are demure, flirtatious and playfully seductive, males taking part in the dances the mating behaviour of eland bulls by sniffing the female folk, grimacing in mock and emulating the mounting action of bull animals.

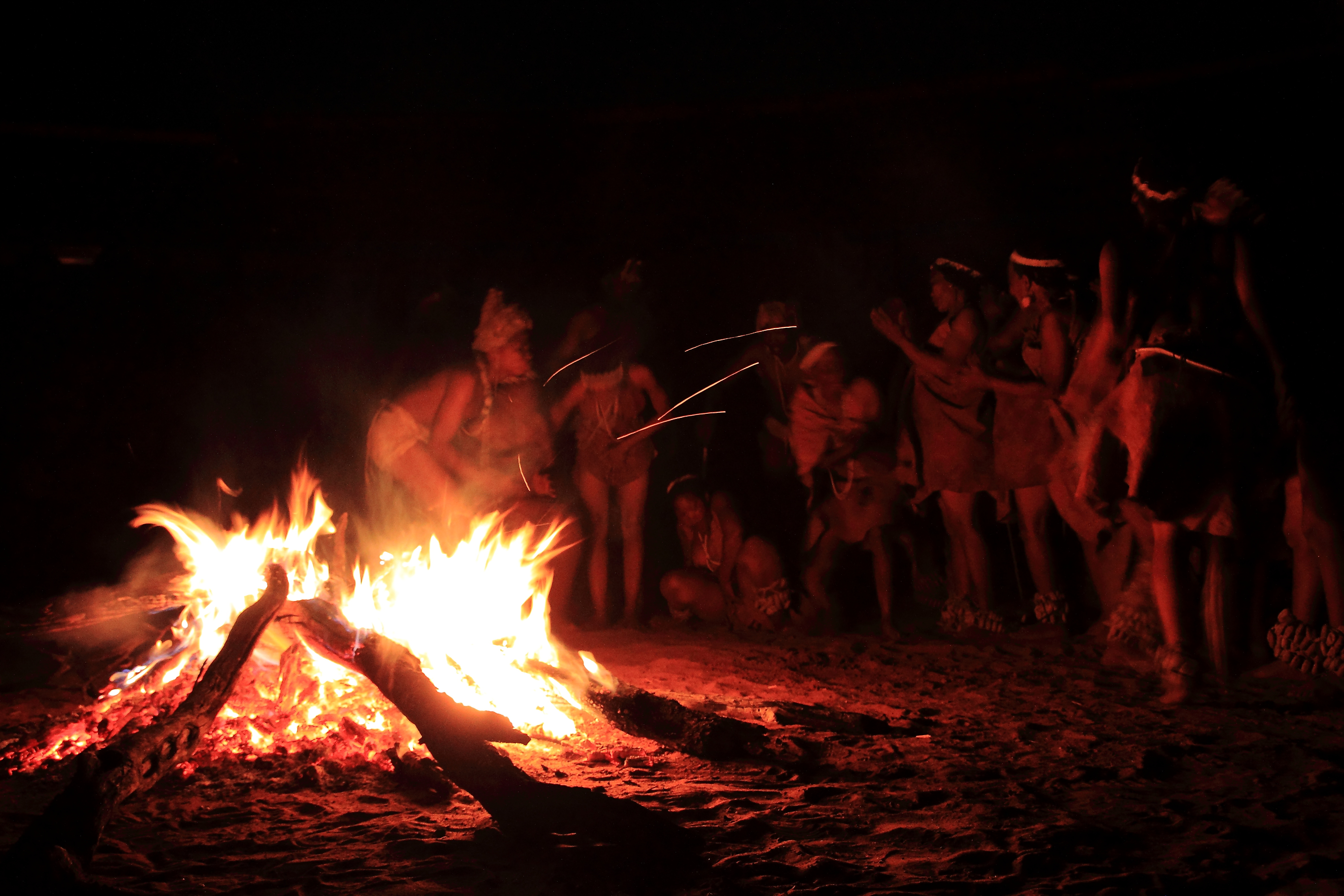
Healing dance at the Kuru dance festival

=== Trance healing dance ===
Performances of this dance are done at dusk and gain momentum at night as the San believe that this time is a divine time when the universe vibrates with sacred energy. The dance is performed as a way to communicate with ancestors and divine spirits and seek for their intervention during the healing ritual of the sick. There is a fire lit and women singers and male dancers sit around the fire in one accord each playing their role accordingly, as the song and dance escalates in rhythm the spiritual leader or shaman becomes possessed with spirit from the ancestral world. At this point male dancers and the shaman would collapse. They believe that at the pick of the song and dance the divine spirit lurks around and the shaman would lay hands on the sick and the dancers thereby removing sickness altogether.
