= Mazabuka =

Town in Zambia

- Town
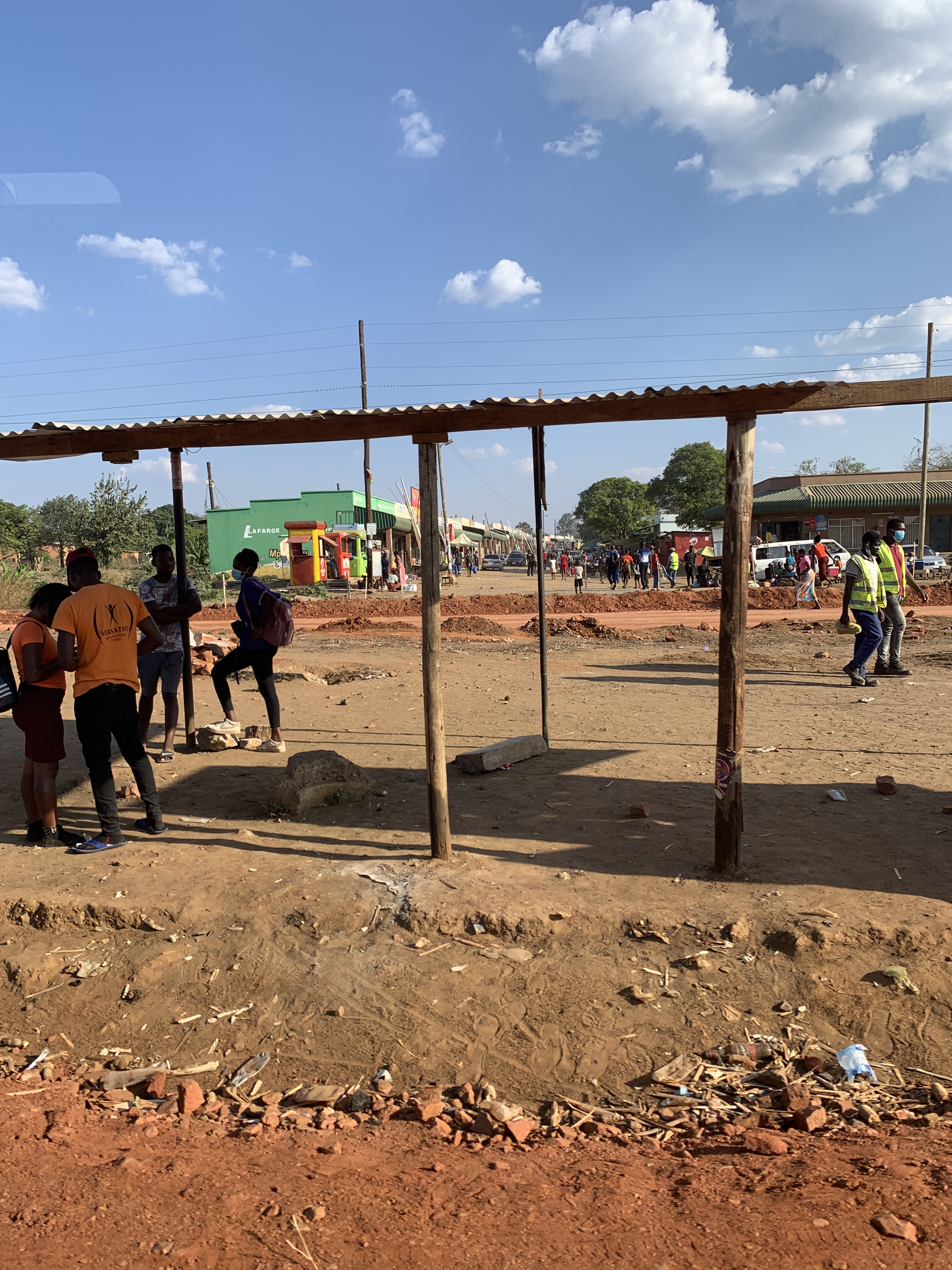

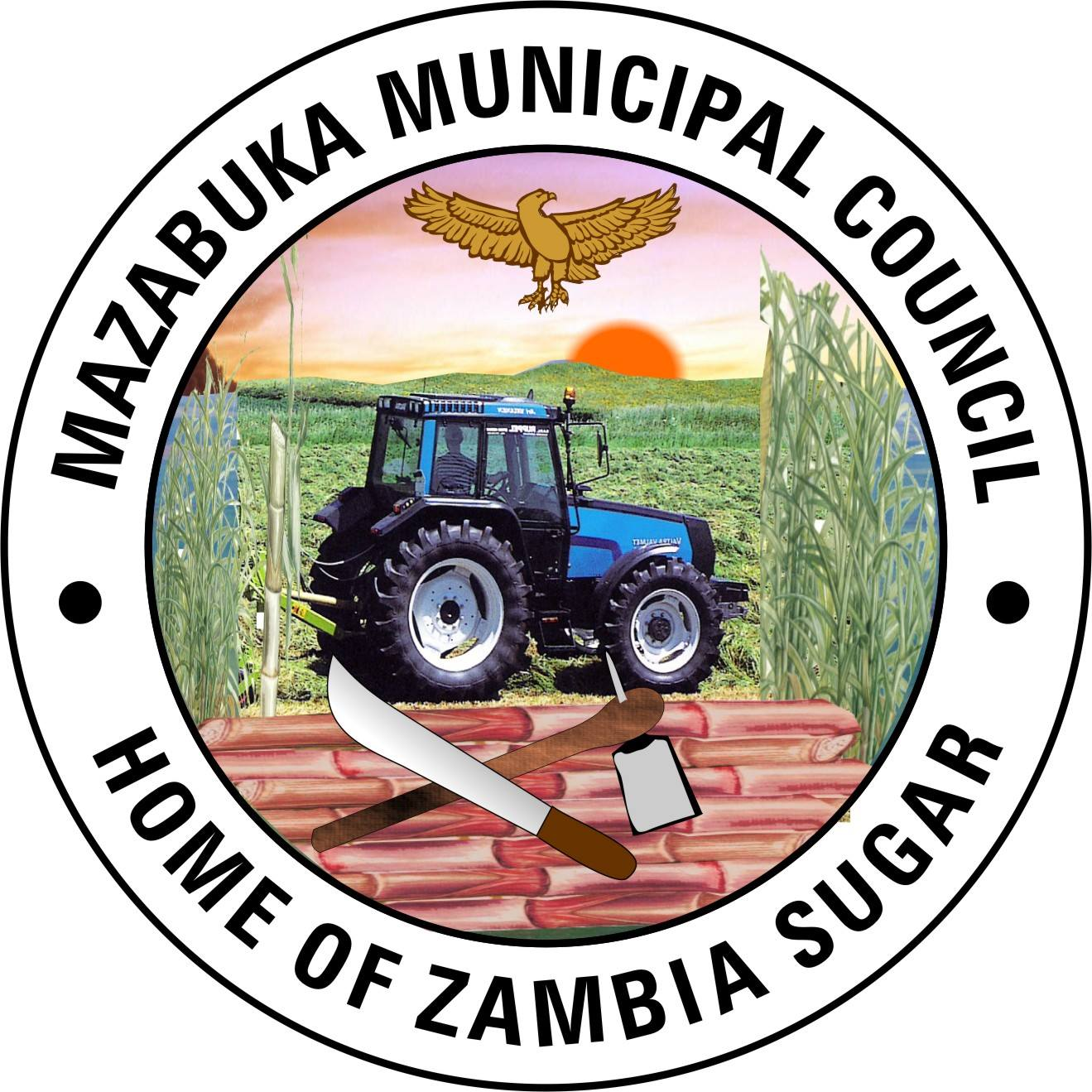
- Seal
- Nickname: sweetest town
- Location within Zambia
- Coordinates: 15°50′48″S 27°44′51″E
- Country: Zambia
- Province: Southern Province
- District: Mazabuka District
- Elevation: 1,067 m (3,501 ft)

Population (2010)
  - Total: 71,700
- Census
- Time zone: UTC+2 (CAT)
- Climate: Cwa

Mazabuka is a town in the Southern Province of Zambia. It is the capital of Mazabuka District, one of the thirteen administrative units in the Southern Province.

== Etymology ==
The name Mazabuka originates from a Tonga local language word "kuzabuka" which means "To cross over the river". The name should have been "mwazabuka" which translates to "you have crossed". However, due assimilation, the name became "Mazabuka" which nonetheless translates to "you have crossed". It is believed that the name was coined after the Tonga people crossed the Kafue River near a place called Nanga during their migrations.

== Location ==
The town is located in Mazabuka District, in Zambia's Southern Province. The town lies on the south east edge of the Kafue Flats wetland, along the Lusaka–Livingstone Road. It is approximately 135 kilometres (84 mi), by road, southwest of Lusaka, the national capital and largest city. The geographical coordinates of Mazabuka are:15°50'48.0"S, 27°44'51.0"E (Latitude:-15.846667; Longitude:27.747500). Mazabuka sits at an average elevation of 1,067 metres (3,501 ft) above mean sea level.

== Overview ==
The town has grown around sugar cane plantations, and currently it hosts the headquarters of Zambia Sugar, the largest sugar-manufacturing company in Zambia, with annual output in excess of 318,467 tonnes (351,050 tons) of crystalline sugar annually.

== History ==
During World War II, 50 Polish refugees escaping from German- and Soviet-occupied Poland, were admitted in Mazabuka in 1941.

== Population ==
In 1990, the city had 24,596 people. In 2000, the town's population was 47,148 people. During the 2010 national census and household population survey, the city had 71,700 inhabitants. The table below illustrates the same data in tabular format.

Year	Population
1990	24,596
2000	47,148
2010	71,700

== Transport ==
While being on the Lusaka–Livingstone Road, Mazabuka is also connected to Lusaka in the north-east and Livingstone in the south-west by the Zambia Railways line.

== Education ==
Mazabuka is home to two well known day schools, among others, in the province. Both are grant aided schools run by the Roman Catholic missionaries. These are St Edmunds Secondary School and Mazabuka Girls Secondary School. The two have the highest enrollment of grade eights(G8) from all the primary schools. Musikili Primary School is a private boarding school for children between 5 and 13 years old. Flamboyant School, is a school for children with disabilities and is located on the outskirts of the town. It is operated by the Mazabuka Association for the Disabled.

== Healthcare ==
Mazabuka is home to (a) Mazabuka Sugar Hospital for the management and staff of Zambia Sugar Plc and (b) Mazabuka General Hospital for the general public.

== Notable people ==
- Mizinga Melu, the Zambian businesswoman and bank chief executive who serves as the managing director and CEO of Absa Bank Zambia Plc, was born in Mazabuka.
- Stanley Fischer, an economist who served as Governor of the Central Bank of Israel, among others, was born on October 15, 1943, in Mazabuka.

== Munali Nickel Mine ==
In September 2006 following a positive feasibility study, Albidon Limited of Australia obtained permits and approvals to mine Nickel in Mazabuka. The initial project development required more than U$180 million, which was funded by debt financing from Barclays Capital and the European Investment Bank and equity from Albidon Limited, JINCHUAN mining group of China and ZCCM Investment Holdings .

In April 2007, then Zambian President, Levy Mwanawasa launched the Munali Nickel Project at a ground breaking ceremony. The mine would be built and operated under the venture's special purpose vehicle Albidon Zambia Limited (AZL).

AZL commenced mining and production of nickel concentrates in April 2008. Operations were suspended in 2009 because of poor market conditions. After the 2008 financial crisis the mine struggled for many years.

It was briefly owned and run by JINCHUAN mining group of China from 2010. JINCHUAN would invest U$ 37 million and employ about 350 workers. However, the mine was shut down again in 2011 due to cashflow problems.

A joint venture Mabiza Resources between Consolidated Nickel Mines Plc of the United kingdom and CE Mining took ownership in 2014 but delayed capital injection which led the government of Zambia at the time to threaten repossession of the asset. From 2015 the JV has placed in U$ 50 million investment to reboot operations at the Munali Nickel Mine. The Mine recommenced operations in 2019.

The mine is managed by an all-Zambian management team and currently has a workforce of 380 people, of which 10% are women. Munali currently exports over 10% high quality Nickel concentrate. The mine is expected to generate 3,300t of Ni in 2020, which is anticipated to reach 4,000t in 2021. Although it is billed as a nickel project, Munali also contains commercial quantities of copper, cobalt and platinum group metals (PGMs).

See Also: Mining in Zambia
