= Jason Quinn =

Jason Quinn may refer to:

- Jason Quinn (accountant), South African accountant and corporate executive
- Jason Quinn (chef), active in Orange County, California
- Quinn brothers' killings
