= List of banks in Botswana =

This is a list of commercial banks in Botswana, as updated by the Bank of Botswana by late 2024.

== List of commercial banks ==
- ABSA Bank Botswana Limited, part of Absa Group
- Access Bank Botswana Limited (formerly BancABC), part of Access Bank Group
- Bank Gaborone Limited
- Bank of Baroda (Botswana) Limited, part of Bank of Baroda Group
- BBS Bank Limited
- First Capital Bank Limited, part of First Capital Bank Group
- First National Bank of Botswana Limited
- Stanbic Bank Botswana Limited, part of Standard Bank Group
- Standard Chartered Bank Botswana Limited, part of Standard Chartered Group

== See also ==
- Economy of Botswana
- List of banks in Africa
