= Musikili Primary School =

Location
- Mazabuka District; Mazabuka, Southern Province; Zambia
- Coordinates: 15°51′42″S 27°38′17″E

Information
- School type: Private

Musikili Primary School is a private boarding school in Zambia for boys and girls from grade 1 to grade 7. The school is located in the Mazabuka District of the Southern Province, about 15 kilometres (9.3 mi) to the west of Mazabuka

== Notes and references ==
- "Zambian prep school Musikili to visit Kingswood". Kingswood College. 24 October 2013.
- "Bailiffs seize min bus from Musikili private school". Lusaka Times. 5 March 2010.
