= Daniel Mminele =

South African bank executive

Aaron Daniel Mminele
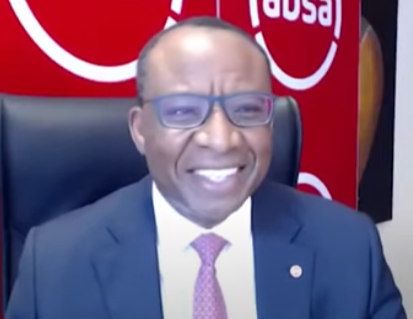
- Speaking at the 2021 World Economic Forum
- Born: 1965, aged 60–61; Phalaborwa, South Africa
- Occupation: Banker
- Years active: 1987-
- Title: CEO, Absa Group Limited
- Term: 2020-2021
- Predecessor: Maria Ramos

Daniel Mminele (born 1965) is a South African banker who was the chief executive officer (CEO) of Absa Group Limited from January 2020 to April 2021. Absa Group Limited is a financial services conglomerate headquartered in Johannesburg, South Africa, with subsidiaries in Botswana, Ghana, Kenya, Mauritius, Mozambique, Seychelles, South Africa, Tanzania, Uganda and Zambia.

Prior to his role at Absa Group, Mminele spent over 20 years at the South African Reserve Bank (SARB). He rose through the ranks to become a Deputy Governor and was a member of key committees, including the Monetary Policy Committee and Financial Stability Committee. He retired from the SARB in June 2019, after completing his second consecutive five-year term as Deputy Governor.

== Background and education ==
Mminele was born in Phalaborwa, Mopani District Municipality, Limpopo Province, South Africa, in 1965. He received his early education in Germany and was trained as a banker at Sparkasse Paderborn, in association with the Chamber of Commerce and Industry of East-Westphalia (Bielefeld), earning his banking qualification in 1987. He subsequently obtained various associate certificates from the Chartered Institute of Bankers of the United Kingdom, attending classes at City of London Polytechnic (later Guildhall University).

== Career ==
Mminele's career began at Westdeutsche Landesbank Girozentrale, where he spent eight years (1987 to 1995) in various roles at its offices in Düsseldorf and London. He returned to South Africa in 1995 and spent approximately two years each at Commerzbank as a customer relations manager in corporate banking, and at African Merchant Bank as a project and structured finance specialist, both based in Johannesburg. In 1999, he joined the South African Reserve Bank. In 2009, he was appointed Deputy Governor, responsible for financial markets and international economic relations.

He was chief executive officer of Absa Group from 15 January 2020 until 20 April 2021, becoming the first person of African descent to hold that role.

== Honors and awards ==
While at the SARB, he was a member of the Reserve Bank's Monetary Policy Committee and Financial Stability Committee. He is the first Black African CEO of Absa. In 2018, German President Frank-Walter Steinmeier bestowed the Great Order of Merit upon Mminele for his contributions to promoting German-South African relations. This order is the highest honor Germany can confer on an individual for services to the country. In 2019, he was awarded the Lifetime Achiever Award by the Association of Black Securities and Investment Professionals (ABSIP).

== See also ==
- Wendy Lucas-Bull

Preceded by Maria Ramos	Chief Executive Officer of Absa Group Limited; 2020-	Succeeded by Incumbent
