= First National Bank of Botswana =

- Company type: Public
- Traded as: BwSE: FNBB
- Industry: Finance, Banking
- Revenue: BWP 1,128m (2015)
- Net income: BWP 591m
- Website: fnbbotswana.co.bw

First National Bank of Botswana is a Botswana-based company engaged in the banking sector. The Bank, through Pick n Pay franchise, offers sales and service channels called FNBB Kiosk. These kiosks are found in identified Pick and Pay stores that are being converted from Score supermarkets. The Bank has around three kiosks located at Lobatse, Gaborone and Francistown, which offer services, such as account opening, general enquiries, loan applications, credit card applications, Internet and cellphone registration, and check deposits. It operates a network of approximately 130 automated teller machines and over 4,000 point of sale devices. It offers customized payment, value add, collection and receipting, cash management, funding, investment, insurance and assurance, forex and trade finance, dedicated relationship manager, operating accounts, and debit and credit cards.

== See also ==
- Botswana Stock Exchange
- List of banks in Botswana
