= Allied Building Society (South Africa) =

Defunct South African bank

Allied Building Society or Allied Bank South Africa is a defunct South African building society and later a licensed bank, that merged with a group of other banks in 1991 to form the Amalgamated Banks of South Africa (ABSA) Limited.

== History ==
The Allied Building Society (ABS) was formed via the merger of two building societies in 1955. These societies were the Rand Provident Building Society created in 1890 and the Alliance Permanent Mutual Building Society formed in 1894. A later merger in 1970 saw the Johannesburg Building Society, created in 1888, merge into Allied Building Society. In 1982, Allied Building Society was the second largest building society in South Africa.

In 1987, Allied Building Society purchased a banking license and became Allied Bank and listed on the Johannesburg Stock Exchange brought about by competition from existing banks in their home loan market and deposit business and banking legislation changes in August 1986. By March 1991, United Building Society had obtained a forty nine percent share holding of Allied. On 31 December 1991, Allied along with United Bank and Volkskas merged to form Amalgamated Banks of South Africa more simply called ABSA.
