= South West African mark =

Temporary currency

Südwestafrikanische Mark (German); Suidwes-Afrikaanse Mark (Afrikaans)
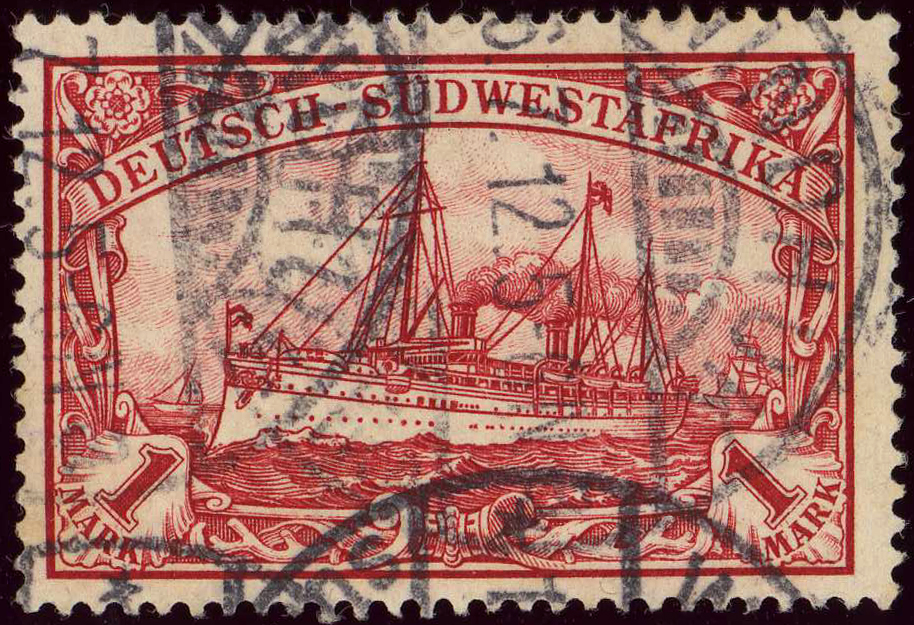
- 1 German South West African mark

Units of account
- Subunit
- 1/100: Pfennig

Denominations
- Banknotes
- Freq. used: 1, 2, and 3 Mark
- Coins
- Freq. used: 10, 25, 50 Pfennig

Demographics
- User(s): South West Africa

The South West African mark was a temporary currency issued in South West Africa between 1916, after the withdrawal of the German South West African mark, and prior to the introduction of the South African pound in 1918.

A number of notes were denominated in South West African marks and pfennigs, especially by the Swakopmund Bookshop that issued 10-, 25-, and 50-pfennig, and 1-, 2-, and 3-mark notes.

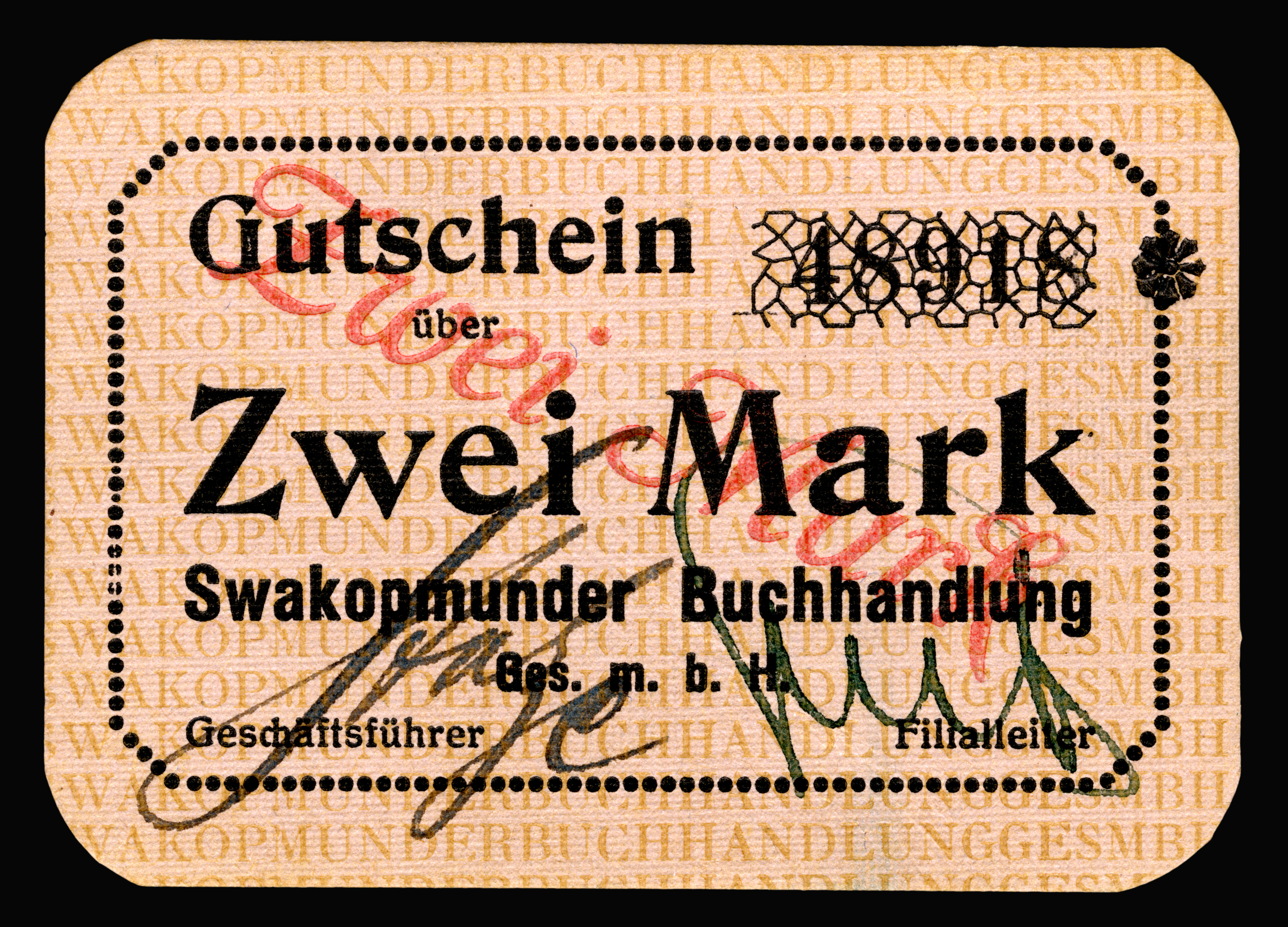
A two-mark Swakopmunder Buchhandlung note issued in 1916

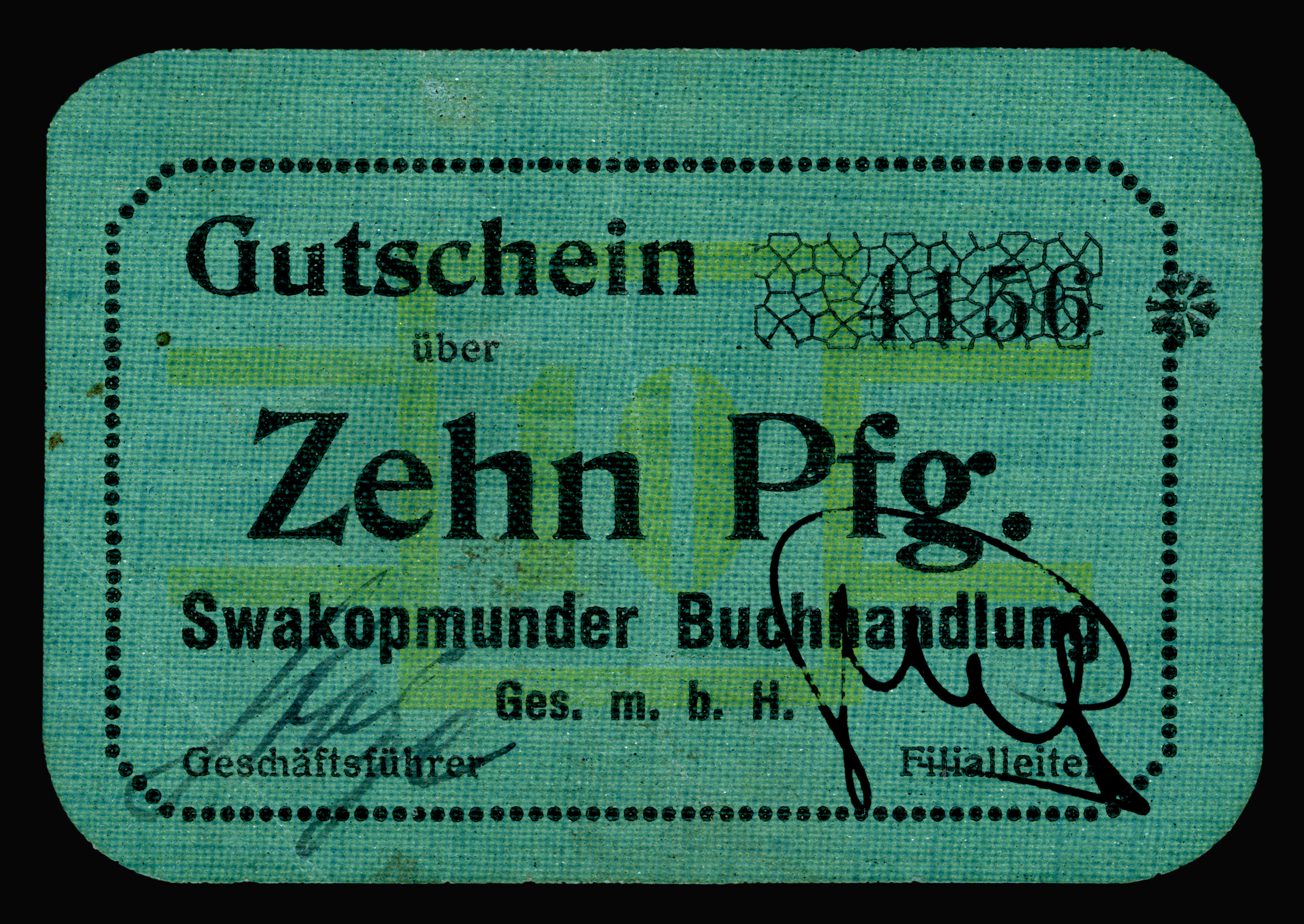
A ten-pfennig Swakopmunder Buchhandlung note issued in 1916

== See also ==
- South West African banknote issuers
