= Absa Bank Ghana =

Ghanaian commercial bank

Coordinates: 05°32′29″N 00°12′25″W

Absa Bank Ghana Limited
- Formerly: Barclays Bank of Ghana Limited
- Type: Subsidiary
- Industry: Financial services
- Founded: 1917; 109 years ago
- Headquarters: Absa House, J.E. Atta-Mills High Street, Accra, Ghana
- Key people: Frances Adu-Mante (board chair); Edward Nartey Botchway (managing director and CEO)
- Products: Loans, checking, savings, mortgages, debit and credit cards, wealth management, investments, etc.
- Total assets: GHS:12.546 billion (US$2.075 billion) (2020)
- Parent: Absa Group Limited
- Website: absa.com.gh

Absa Bank Ghana Limited (ABGL), formerly known as Barclays Bank of Ghana Limited, is a commercial bank in Ghana, licensed by the Bank of Ghana, the country's central bank and national banking regulator. ABGL is a subsidiary of Absa Group Limited, a financial services conglomerate, headquartered in South Africa, with subsidiaries in 12 African countries and with assets in excess of US$87 billion as of 30 June 2017. Absa Group's shares trade on the Johannesburg Stock Exchange under the symbol ABG.

== Location ==
The headquarters of the bank are located at Absa House, J.E. Atta-Mills High Street, in the central business district of Accra, the capital of Ghana.

== Overview ==
Absa Bank Ghana is a large financial services company, serving corporate clients, high networth individuals, retail customers and small and medium enterprises. As of 31 December 2020, the bank had assets of GHS:12.546 billion (US$2.075 billion), with shareholders' equity of GHS:1.948 billion (US$322.2 million).

== History ==
According to the archives of Barclays Bank Ghana, Colonial Bank opened shop in what was then known as the Gold Coast in 1917. In 1925, Anglo-Egyptian Bank, Colonial Bank and National Bank of South Africa were merged to form Barclays Bank (Dominion, Colonial and Overseas). In 1975, the Government of Ghana acquired 40 percent shareholding in Barclays Bank of Ghana. That stake was returned in 2003. In 2013, the bank became a member of Barclays Africa Group, with Barclays Plc holding a controlling 62.3 percent majority ownership.

== Name change ==
In 2016, Barclays Bank Plc, which owned 62.3 percent of Barclays Africa Group (BAG), the then majority shareholder of Barclays Bank of Ghana Limited, decided to divest its majority shareholding in BAG, worth £3.5 billion at that time. In 2017 Barclays reduced its shareholding in BAG to 14.9 percent.

Following that, in 2018 BAG re-branded to Absa Group Limited. Under the terms of that re-brand, Absa had until June 2020 to change the names of its subsidiaries in 12 African countries.

In Ghana, the re-brand concluded on 10 February 2020, when both the bank's legal and business names became Absa Bank Ghana Limited.

== Automated teller machines ==
As of May 2020 the bank had over 160 automated teller machines (ATMs). Of these, at least 110 are intelligent ATMS (iATMs), capable of accepting deposits, withdrawals without an ATM card and money transfers between customer accounts at Absa. Daily money withdrawal maximums have also been increased.

== Governance ==
The bank is supervised by a board of directors, was chaired by Charles A. Cofie, and one of the non-executive directors. The managing director and CEO is Edward Nartey Botchway.

Mrs Frances Adu –Mante was appointed as the board chair of Absa Bank Ghana in 2021. She assumes office with the expertise as a banker, legal practitioner and business executive for over 42 years.

She occupies other positions such as the chair of the board of trustees of the University of Ghana Business School Endowment Fund. Also she serves as a member of the Governing Council of the Presbyterian University College of Ghana.

The former Ecobank employee is a consultant at ROFAM Consultancy Services, a Legal & Human Resource Management Consultancy.

== Philanthropic Activities ==
Aside its banking activities, the bank has engaged in initiatives as a form of give back to society. This includes a financial literacy programme for Persons with Disabilities to empower with skills on budgeting, savings, borrowing and fraud prevention. A number of initiatives to empower and support women businesses, such as the She Business : A two (2) million in collateral free loans for women entrepreneurs. Absa Inspire Me Conference : An annual conference to empower and guide women-owned businesses to do well, with the likes of accomplished women in the business and banking space such as Ibukun Awosika gracing the conference as a key note speaker in 2023

== See also ==
- List of banks in Ghana
