= Absa Bank Mauritius =

Commercial bank in Mauritius

Coordinates: 20°14′36.5″S 57°29′37.5″E

Absa Bank Mauritius Limited
- Type: Subsidiary
- Industry: Financial services
- Founded: 1919; 107 years ago
- Headquarters: Absa House, 68 Wall Street, Cybercity, Ebene, Mauritius
- Key people: Iqbal Rajahbalee (chairman); Ravin Dajee (Managing Director and CEO)
- Products: Loans, checking, savings, mortgages, debit and credit cards, wealth management, investments, etc.
- Number of employees: Absa Group Limited
- Website: www.absabank.mu/en/personal/

Absa Bank Mauritius Limited (ABML), formerly known as Barclays Bank Mauritius Limited, is a commercial bank in Mauritius, licensed by the Bank of Mauritius, the country's central bank and national banking regulator.

== Location ==
The headquarters of the bank are located at Absa House, 68 Wall Street, Cybercity, Ebene, Mauritius. Ebene is a town approximately 16 kilometres (10 mi), by road, south of Port Louis, the capital and largest city in the country.

== Overview ==
Absa Bank Mauritius is a large financial services company, serving corporate clients, high networth individuals, retail customers and small and medium enterprises. As of September 2010, the bank had assets of MUR:127,295,000,000 (US$3.343 billion), with shareholders' equity of MUR:16,011,000,000 (US$420.494 million).

This bank is a subsidiary of Absa Group Limited, a financial services conglomerate, headquartered in South Africa, with subsidiaries in 12 African countries and with assets in excess of US$87 billion as of 30 June 2017, whose shares of stock trade on the Johannesburg Stock Exchange under the symbol ABG.

== History ==
According to the archives of Barclays Bank Mauritius, the oldest bank in Mauritius that became a component of the bank is The National Bank of South Africa, which established a branch in the country in 1919. This brought the Mauritian operations under Barclays Bank. In 2002, Barclays Bank Mauritius bought Banque Nationale de Paris Intercontinentale (BNPI). This acquisition brought with it six branches to add to Barclays' existing 13 branches.

Since then the bank went through mergers, acquisitions and divestitures. Barclays Bank Mauritius operated as a branch of Barclays until 1 June 2013, when it was incorporated as Barclays Bank Mauritius. That same year, the bank became a member of Barclays Africa Group, with Barclays Plc holding a controlling 62.3 percent majority ownership.. On 10 February 2020, the Bank of Mauritius announced the cancelling of Barclays Bank Mauritius Limited's licence and that a new banking licence issued for the company in its new name Absa Bank (Mauritius) Limited.

== Name change ==
In 2016, Barclays, which owned 62.3 percent of Barclays Africa Group (BAG), the then majority shareholder of Barclays Bank of Mauritius Limited, decided to divest its majority shareholding in BAG, worth £3.5 billion at that time. In 2017 Barclays reduced its shareholding in BAG to 14.9 percent.

Subsequently, in 2018 BAG re-branded to Absa Group Limited. Under the terms of that re-brand, Absa has until June 2020 to change the names of its subsidiaries in 12 African countries.

In Mauritius, the re-brand concluded on 10 February 2020, when both the bank's legal and business names became Absa Bank Mauritius Limited.

== Governance ==
The bank is supervised by a ten-person board of directors, chaired by Iqbal Rajahbalee, one of the non-executive directors. The managing director and CEO is Ravin Dajee.

== See also ==
- List of banks in Mauritius
- List of banks in Africa
