= Imperial Bank South Africa =

Commercial bank in South Africa

- Company type: Private
- Industry: Financial services
- Founded: 1996
- Headquarters: Johannesburg, South Africa
- Key people: Hubert Brody, Chairman, René van Wyk, Managing Director and Chief Executive Officer
- Products: Loans, Savings, Checking, Investments, Debit Cards, Credit Cards, Mortgages
- Parent: Nedbank
- Website: www.imperialbank.co.za

Imperial Bank South Africa Limited, also referred to as Imperial Bank South Africa (IBSA), but commonly known as Imperial Bank, is a commercial bank in the Republic of South Africa. It is licensed as a locally controlled financial institution by the Reserve Bank of South Africa, the national banking regulator.

== History ==
The bank was established in 1996 by Imperial Holdings Limited. In 2001, the Nedbank Group acquired 50.1% controlling interest in the bank. Imperial Holdings retained 49.9% shareholding. In August 2009, the Nedbank Group acquired the 49.9% that it already did not own, thereby becoming the sole owner of the bank.

== Branch network ==
As of November 2010, IBSA maintained headquarters at 24 Achter Road, Sandton, Rivonia, Johannesburg, South Africa. No other information is available about the branches of the bank.

== Governance ==
The Chairman of the ten (10) person Board of Directors, is Hubert Brody, a non-Executive Director. The Managing Director and Chief Executive Officer is René Van Wyk.

== See also ==
- List of banks in South Africa
- South African Reserve Bank
- Economy of South Africa
- Banking in South Africa
- Nedbank Group
