= Risk assurance =

Risk assurance is often associated with accounting practices and is a growing industry whereby internal processes are developed to create a "checks and balances" system. These checks predominantly identify differences between risk appetite and real risk.Business risk refers to factors that can affect the company, both internally and externally. There are various types of business risks: strategic, compliance, financial and operational. Risk assurance aims to mitigate any of these areas. As such, companies can pre-analyse the industry to scout for potential risks or if a risk has already occurred, managers can analyse the problem in an attempt to mitigate the effects.

Risk assurance involves tiers of internal processes including management and internal controls, financial control and security, inspection, compliance, internal audit and leadership teams that are aware of the companies internal and external risks. Following internal processes, assurance requires an external audit team who examines the internal processes effectiveness and reports to senior management with successes and areas for redevelopment.

Auditors in risk assurance auditing filter information technology general controls (ITGCs) and completing a system and organisation control (SOC 1) report.

Internal control is a large component of risk assurance whereby an entity's management design processes to provide reasonable assurance regarding the achievement of operational objectives, reporting and compliance.

Internal control's 5 components include:

1. Control environment

2. Risk assessment

3. Control activities

4. Information and communication

5. Monitoring activities

Physical internal control are accounting procedures that prevent fraud and ensure operational efficiency such as CCTV, passwords, and security locks. Internal audits are another internal control and play a role in corporate governance. These audits evaluate the effectiveness of a businesses' internal control. Another internal control is having different employees delegated to different tasks in a transaction.
