= Absa Bank Mozambique =

Mozambican commercial bank

Coordinates: 25°58′28″S 32°34′27″E

- Type: Subsidiary
- Industry: Financial services
- Headquarters: Rani Towers; Maputo, Mozambique
- Key people: Victor Gomes (chairman); Pedro Carvalho'm (Managing Director)
- Products: Loans, checking, savings, investments, debit cards
- Parent: Absa Group Limited
- Website: www.absa.co.mz/en/personal/

Absa Bank Mozambique, formerly known as Barclays Bank Mozambique, is a commercial bank in Mozambique. It is licensed by the Bank of Mozambique, the central bank and national banking regulator.

== Overview ==
The bank is a large retail bank that serves the banking needs of individuals, small and medium-sized businesses (SMEs), and large corporations. It is a member of the South African banking conglomerate, Absa Group Limited, whose stock is traded on the Johannesburg Stock Exchange and whose total assets exceeded US$91 billion, as of October 2019.

== Branch network ==
The bank's headquarters is at Rani Towers, in the central business district of Maputo, the capital and largest city in Mozambique. As of February 2020, the bank maintained branches in multiple locations across the country.

== Name change ==
In 2016, Barclays Bank Plc, which owned 62.3 percent of Barclays Africa Group (BAG), the then parent company of Barclays Bank of Mozambique, decided to divest its majority shareholding in BAG, worth £3.5 billion at that time. In 2017 Barclays reduced its shareholding in BAG to 14.9 percent.

Following those events, BAG re-branded to Absa Group Limited in 2018. Under the terms of that re-brand, Absa has until June 2020 to change the names of its subsidiaries in 12 African countries.

Beginning in October 2019, Barclays Bank Mozambique began re-branding to Absa Bank Mozambique. The re-brand concluded on 11 November 2019, when both the bank's legal and business names became Absa Bank Mozambique.

== Governance ==
The bank is governed by a board of directors. The chair of the board is one of the non-executive directors. The current chairperson is Victor Gomes. The managing director of the bank is Pedro Carvalho.

== See also ==
- List of banks in Mozambique
- Absa Group Limited
