= Absa Bank Seychelles Limited =

Commercial bank in Seychelles

Coordinates: 04°37′24″S 55°27′08″E

- Company type: Subsidiary
- Industry: Financial services
- Founded: 1959; 67 years ago
- Headquarters: Victoria House, State House Avenue, Victoria, Seychelles
- Key people: Jean Weeling Lee (chairman); Johan Van Schalkwyk (managing director and CEO)
- Products: Loans, checking, savings, investments, debit cards
- Number of employees: 130 (2006)
- Parent: Absa Group Limited
- Website: www.absa.sc/personal

Absa Bank Seychelles Limited, formerly known as Barclays Bank Seychelles Limited, is a commercial bank in Seychelles. It is licensed by the Central Bank of Seychelles, the central bank and national banking regulator.

== Location ==
The bank's headquarters is located at Capital City Building, Independence Avenue, Victoria, Seychelles. The geographic coordinates of the bank's headquarters are:(Latitude:-4.622926386062543; Longitude:55.45356283347604).

== Overview ==
The bank is involved in meeting the banking needs of individuals, small and medium-sized businesses (SMEs), and large corporations. It is one of the nine commercial banks licensed in the country. Absa Bank Seychelles Limited is a subsidiary of Absa Group Limited, the Pan African financial services conglomerate headquartered in South Africa, with subsidiaries in 12 African countries, whose total assets exceeded US$87 billion as at 30 June 2017.

== History ==
The bank opened in the country 1959, as a branch of Barclays of the United Kingdom. The bank operated in that capacity until 2000, when Barclays Bank Seychelles Limited was incorporated. In 2006, the bank served approximately 35,000 customers, through 5 branches, 7 ATMs and 130 members of staff. In 2013, the bank became a member of Barclays Africa Group, in which Barclays Plc had a 62.3 per cent majority shareholding.

== Name change ==
Beginning in October 2019, Barclays Bank Seychelles Limited began re-branding to Absa Bank Seychelles Limited. The process concluded on 10 February 2020, when the legal and business names of the bank changed to Absa Bank Seychelles Limited.

== Governance ==
The bank is governed by a board of directors. The chairman of the board is Jean Weeling Lee, one of the non-executive directors. The managing director and CEO is Johan Van Schalkwyk.

== See also ==
- List of banks in Seychelles
- Absa Group Limited
