= National Bank of Commerce (Tanzania) =

Tanzanian Bank

NBC (Tanzania) Limited
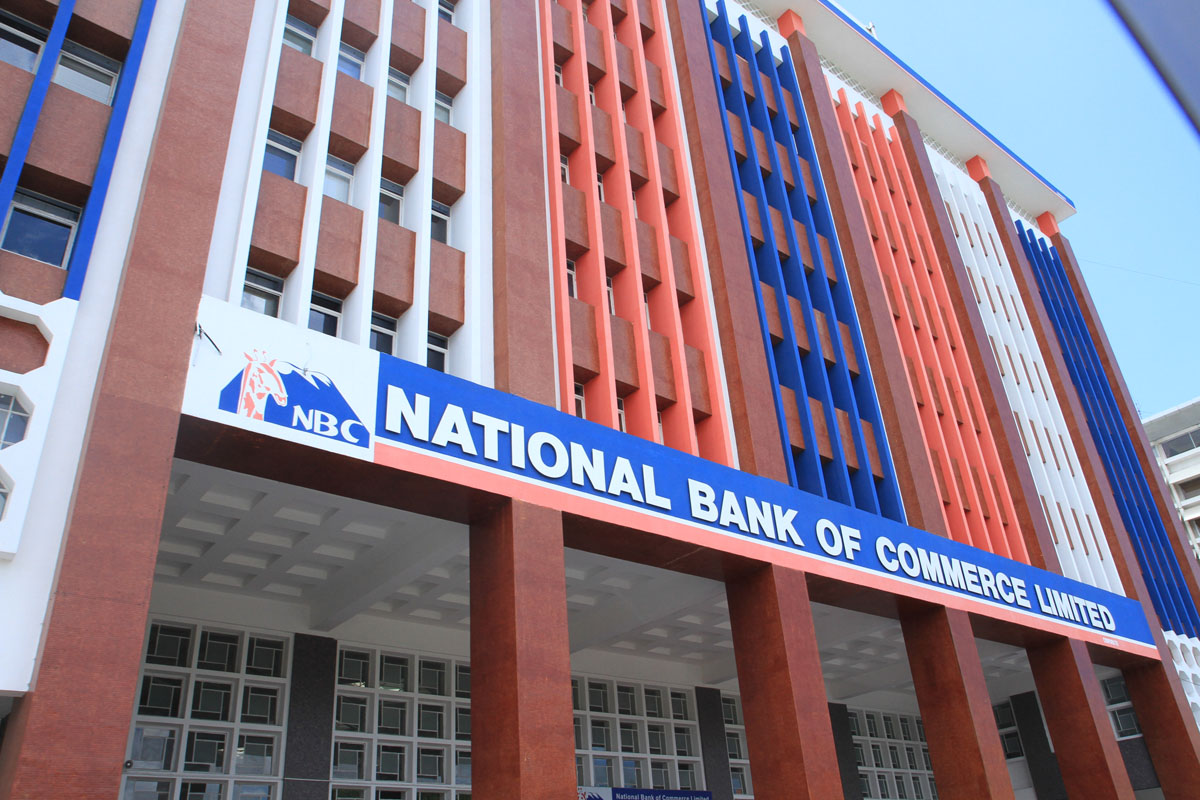
- Type: Private
- Industry: Financial services
- Founded: 1997; 29 years ago
- Headquarters: Sokoine Drive, Kivukoni, Dar es Salaam, Tanzania
- Key people: Francis Mwakapalila; Chairman; Theobald Sabi; Managing Director
- Products: Loans, Savings, Checking, Investments, Debit Cards, Global Markets, Mortgages
- Revenue: ▲:Pretax:TSh 14.3 billion (US$6.5 million) (2013)
- Total assets: TSh 1,768+ trillion (US$779+ million) (2017)
- Number of employees: 1,200+ (2017)
- Website: www.nbctz.com

National Bank of Commerce (Tanzania), whose full name is National Bank of Commerce (Tanzania) Limited, sometimes referred to as NBC (Tanzania), or as NBC (Tanzania) Limited, is a commercial bank in Tanzania. It is one of the commercial banks licensed by the Bank of Tanzania, the country's central bank and the national banking regulator. In August 2019, the bank was fined TSh 1 billion (US$435,000) because of the failure to establish a data center in the East African nation.

== Location ==
The headquarters of the bank and its main branch are located along Sokoine Drive, in Dar es Salaam, Tanzania's financial capital and largest city. The geographical coordinates of the bank's headquarters are: 06°49'04.0"S, 39°17'24.0"E (Latitude:-6.817778; Longitude:39.290000)

== Overview ==
It is one of the oldest banks in the country tracing its roots to as far back as Tanzanian independence. At the end of the year in 2015, the bank had an asset base of over US$773 million (TSh 1.69 trillion) and is the fourth-best capitalized commercial bank in the country, behind National Microfinance Bank, CRDB Bank and FBME Bank.

At the end of 2017, Tanzania's total banking assets were valued at TSh 29.97 trillion (US$13.2 billion). At the same time, National Bank of Commerce (Tanzania) was reported to own 5.6 per cent of all national banking assets, translating to TSh 1,768+ trillion (US$779+ million).

== History ==
The bank traces its origins to 1967 when the Tanzanian Government nationalized financial institutions, including banks. In 1991, the banking industry was deregulated. Six years later, in 1997, the institution then known as "NBC" was split into three separate entities: (a) NBC Holding Corporation (b) National Microfinance Bank (NMB) and (c) NBC (1997) Limited. In 2000, the South African banking group, Absa Group Limited, acquired a majority stake in NBC (1997) Limited. The Government of Tanzania retained a 30% shareholding and the International Finance Corporation (IFC), a member of the World Bank Group took up 15% shareholding in the bank. The new entity became known as National Bank of Commerce (Tanzania) Limited.

=== Merger ===
As of March 2016, Barclays Bank Plc. was seeking regulatory approval in Tanzania to merge this bank with Barclays Bank Tanzania in which Barclays maintains a controlling interest.

== Corporate affairs ==
=== Ownership ===
At the end of 2015, the bank maintained a shareholder's equity of approximately US$117.7 million (TSh 257 billion). The shareholding in NBC (Tanzania), as of February 2011, is as depicted in the table below:

National Bank of Commerce (Tanzania) Stock Ownership
Rank	Name of Owner	Percentage Ownership
1	Absa Group Limited	55.0
2	Government of Tanzania	30.0
3	International Finance Corporation	15.0
4	TOTAL	100.0

==== Barclays Africa Group ====
Formerly known as Barclays Africa Group, is the largest consumer banking group in South Africa. It controls assets in excess of US$77 billion (ZAR:841.33 billion), as of June 2013. In addition to its vast businesses inside South Africa, the Group owns subsidiaries operating in various parts of Africa, including majority shareholding in businesses in Angola, Mozambique and Tanzania, as well as minority interests in businesses in Namibia and Zimbabwe. In 2013, Absa Group Limited re-branded to Barclays Africa Group. In 2018, it rebranded back to Absa Group Limited.

=== Key people ===
Francis Mwakapalila is the Chairman of the Board. The Managing Director of NBC (Tanzania) Limited is Theobald Sabi, who assumed the role following the departure of former Managing Director Edward Marks who was reassigned.

== Branch Network ==
As of August 2018, NBC Bank Tanzania maintains a branch network of 49 branches and numerous ATM's in most major cities and towns of the country.

== See also ==
- Barclays Africa
- NMB Tanzania
- Barclays Tanzania
- Tanzania Banks
- Tanzania Economy
