= Absa Bank Kenya =

Bank of Kenya

Absa Bank Kenya Plc
- Type: Public
- Traded as: KN: ABSA
- Industry: Banking
- Founded: 1916; 110 years ago
- Headquarters: Nairobi, Kenya
- Key people: Charles Muchene (chairman); Jeremy Awori (managing director)
- Products: Loans, credit cards, savings, investments, mortgages, insurance
- Revenue: ▲: Aftertax: KES:7.161 billion (US$68.18 million) (2019)
- Total assets: KES:374.109 billion (US$3.561 billion) (2019)
- Owner: Absa Group Limited (68.5%)
- Number of employees: 1991 (2020)
- Website: www.absabank.co.ke/personal/

Absa Bank Kenya Plc, formerly Barclays Bank Kenya Limited, is a commercial bank in Kenya and a subsidiary of South Africa-based Absa Group Limited. It is licensed by the Central Bank of Kenya, the central bank and national banking regulator.

== Location ==
The headquarters and main branch of the bank are located at Absa Westend Building, off Waiyaki Way, in Nairobi, Kenya's capital and largest city.

== Overview ==
As of December 2019, the bank is a large financial services institution in Kenya, with an asset base in excess of KSh:374.109 billion (US$3.561 billion), with shareholders' equity of KSh:44.079 billion (US$419.654 million).

As of March 2014, Barclays Bank of Kenya was the fifth-largest commercial bank in Kenya, by assets, behind KCB Group, Equity Group Holdings Limited, Cooperative Bank and Standard Chartered Kenya.

== History ==
The bank's history traces from 1916 when the National Bank of South Africa (now First National Bank) opened a branch. In 1925, National Bank of South Africa was merged with the Anglo-Egyptian Bank and the Colonial Bank in 1925 to form Barclays Bank (Dominion, Colonial and Overseas). This brought the Kenyan operations under Barclays Bank.

The bank was licensed in its present form in 1953 and in 1978 it was incorporated locally as Barclays Bank of Kenya, a wholly owned subsidiary of Barclays Bank International. The bank listed its shares on the Nairobi Stock Exchange in 1986 through a successful IPO. These shares trade under the symbol: BARC.

Before 2013, The bank is a subsidiary of Barclays Bank Plc. (through Barclays Africa), an International financial services conglomerate, whose shares of stock are listed on the London Stock Exchange under the symbol: BARC and on the New York Stock Exchange (NYSE) under the symbol: BCS. In 2013, Barclays Plc adopted the combined strategy to operate as “One Bank in Africa” with an aim of increasing efficiency and boosting returns from the African Units. This led to the merging of all Barclays Plc. businesses in Africa (other than Egypt and Zimbabwe units) through Absa Group Limited, leading to the formation of Barclays Africa Group. The stock of Barclays Africa Group, which owns 68.5% of Barclays Bank of Kenya, is listed on the JSE.

== Shareholding ==
As of 31 December 2020, the major shareholders in the stock of the bank were as illustrated in the table below:

Barclays Bank of Kenya stock ownership
Rank	Name of owner	Percentage ownership
1	Absa Group Limited	68.50
2	Patel, Baloobhai;Patel, Amarjeet Baloobhai	0.78
3	Kenya Commercial Bank Nominees Limited A/C 915b	0.77
4	Standard Chartered Nominees Resd A/C KE11450	0.70
5	Standard Chartered Kenya Nominees Ltd A/C Ke004667	0.57
6	Standard Chartered Nominees Resd A/C KE11443	0.48
7	Standard Chartered Nominees Resd A/C KE11401	0.48
8	The Jubilee Insurance Company Of Kenya Limited	0.37
9	Kariuki, Patrick Njogu	0.34
10	Standard Chartered Nominees A/C 9230	0.33
11	Others	26.68
	Total	100.00

== Branch network ==
As of June 2026, the bank maintains a network of 91 branches and 208 ATMs in various locations across Kenya.

== Governance ==
The chairman of the ten-person board of directors of Absa Bank Kenya is Charles Muchene, one of the non-executive directors. Jeremy Awori serves as the managing director of the bank.

== Re-branding ==
Following the issuance of the requisite regulatory approvals, Barclays Bank of Kenya re-branded to Absa Bank Kenya, on 10 February 2020.

== See also ==
- Economy of Kenya
- List of banks in Kenya
- List of banks in Africa
- Central Bank of Kenya
