= Volkskas =

Volkskas Beperk / Ltd.
- Company type: Division
- Industry: Banking
- Founded: 1934
- Defunct: 1992
- Successor: ABSA
- Headquarters: Pretoria
- Area served: South Africa, South West Africa
- Key people: J.J. Bosman (Founder), Dr. Danie Cronjé (CEO)
- Products: Financial services
- Total assets: ZAR 5 billion (1981)

Volkskas Beperk (English: Peoples' Bank) was a South African bank founded in 1934 as a cooperative loan bank, becoming a commercial bank in 1941. In 1991, by which time it had become South Africa's largest Afrikaner bank, Volkskas merged with United Building Society, Allied Building Society and Trust Bank to form Amalgamated Banks of South Africa.

The bank issued banknotes for circulation in South West Africa between 1949 and 1959 from its Windhoek branch.

== Early years ==
Volkskas was formally opened on 1 February 1935 in the De Villiers building in Pretoria by J.J. Bosman and a typist. It was registered as a cooperative loan bank under the Co-Operative Societies Act and thus began serving Afrikaners forced by the Great Depression to move to the city between 1929 and 1933.

The bank was already registered on 9 July 1934 as Volkskas (Koöperatief) Beperk (i.e. "Limited"). The bank provided credit union services in which people could set up savings or deposit accounts, and clients could obtain bank loan installments against the signature of two friends or other approved security.

After four months in business, the bank turned a profit of R17.06. At this stage, the bank had no branches and two tellers. The first branch was opened on 1 August 1935, on Mark Street in Johannesburg. The premises on which the building stood were the first property owned by Volkskas.

== Expansion ==
In 1939, Volkskas began opening checking accounts. Negotiations with the other large banks of the time came to nothing, so on 1 March 1941, Volkskas began circulating its first checks. Within three weeks, the other banks began accepting Volkskas's checks. That same year, it also expanded to become a full commercial bank, realizing the founders' long-awaited dream. Full banking status brought rapid expansion and a solid economic footing to the company.

Volkskas's inter-registration with established local banks under the Banking Law of 1942 helped it connect better with the local economy, to the point that in 1947, it became a member of the Settlement Banking Office and set up agency agreements with other area banks in towns where the latter were unrepresented.

Already in 1946, overseas representation began to meet the growing needs of clients who conducted transactions through other channels in other countries. This branch was aided by Volkskas getting certification in 1947 as a foreign currency handler. The bank handled most currencies of the world.

== Further growth ==
In 1950, it was decided to change the name from Volkskas to Suid-Afrikaanse Nasionale Handelsbank Bpk. The name had already been approved by the authorities by Barclays Bank (D.C. & O.), and a suit was filed in the High Court of South Africa over the name. In 1951, the verdict was resolved in Barclays's favor.

In 1952, J.J. Bosman, founder of Volkskas, died. At the time of his death, it was already the third-largest bank in South Africa. On 22 August 1952, the 100th branch was opened in Strand, Western Cape by Dr. T.E. Dönges. Later that year, a branch also opened in Transkei.

Changes in the financial world required Volkskas to eventually diversify into other industries. The bank entered the leasing field with the purchase of Trans-Orange Finance and Development Bank and long-term financing through the Volkskas Belegginskorporasie Beperk. Volkskas helped found the Nasionale Bouvereniging, which later played a primary role in supporting Afrikaner interests in construction along with Saambou.

The bank has been computerized since 1967. The integration of wholesale banking by the company was also a highlight. Volkskas Aksepbank Beperk ("Volkskas Merchant Banking Limited") established operations to serve corporate clients in the industries of industrial materials, mining, trade and real estate, public corporations, and local authorities. Volkskas Industriële Bank Beperk provided wholesale financing for large lease-to-buy and rental transactions with a focus on industrial materials. Volkskas Kommersiële Eiendomme Beperk was the division handling property interests (other than branches).

This expansion required the group to restructure so the divisions could fully realize their profit potential. A new bank holding company, Volkskas-Groep Beperk, was founded with five active subsidiaries, including Volkskas Beperk, Volkskas Aksepbank Beperk, Volkskas Industriële Bank Beperk, Volkskas Nywerhede Beperk, and Volkskas Kommersiële Eiendomme Beperk.

In 1978, the Volkskas Building (now ABSA Centre Pretoria) opened. On 30 September 1991, the Amalgamated Banks of South Africa (ABSA) group was formed from the merger of the United Building Society, Allied Building Society, and Volkskas Groups with part of the Sage Group. This resulted from the acquisition of the Bankorp Group consisting of Trust Bank and Sentrabank on 1 April 1992. These banks all traded under their own names until 1998, when United, Volkskas, Allied, and TrustBank all merged under the ABSA umbrella.

== See also ==
- Banknotes of Volkskas Limited (South West Africa)
- ABSA Group Limited

== Sources ==
- Monumentaal die bouwerke... ATKV. 1980
