= Absa Bank Botswana =

Commercial bank in Botswana

Coordinates: 24°39′02″S 25°54′14″E

Absa Bank Botswana Limited
- Formerly: Barclays Bank of Botswana Limited
- Type: Public subsidiary
- Traded as: BwSE: ABBL
- Industry: Financial services
- Founded: 1950; 76 years ago
- Key people: Oduetse Andrew Motshidisi (chairman); Keabetswe Pheko-Moshagane (managing director and CEO)
- Products: Loans, checking, savings, mortgages, debit and credit cards, wealth management, investments, etc.
- Total assets: BWP:17,963 billion (US$1.609 billion)
- Number of employees: 1,100 (2020)
- Parent: Absa Group Limited (67.8%)
- Website: absa.co.bw/personal/

Absa Bank Botswana Limited, formerly known as Barclays Bank of Botswana Limited, is a commercial bank in Botswana, licensed by the Bank of Botswana, the country's central bank and national banking regulator.

== Location ==
The headquarters of the bank are located at the 5th Floor, Building 4 Plaza, Plot 74358, in the central business district of Gaborone, the capital and largest city in Botswana.

== Overview ==
Absa Bank Botswana is a large financial services company, serving corporate clients, high networth individuals, retail customers and small and medium enterprises. As of June 2019, the bank had assets of BWP:17,963,238,000 (US$1.609 billion), with shareholders' equity of BWP:2,103,780,000 (US$188.438 million).

This bank is a subsidiary of Absa Group Limited, a financial services conglomerate, headquartered in South Africa, with subsidiaries in 12 African countries and with assets in excess of US$87 billion as of 30 June 2017, whose shares of stock trade on the Johannesburg Stock Exchange under the symbol ABG.

== History ==
According to the bank's website, it started operating in Botswana as a branch of Barclays Bank Plc of the United Kingdom, in 1950. In 1975, Barclays Bank of Botswana was incorporated as a legal business entity and continued to operate in the country, as a subsidiary of Barclays. On 19 June 1989, the shares of the bank were listed on the Botswana Stock Exchange, where today, they trade under the symbol ABBL.

== Name change ==
Barclays Bank Plc, which owned 62.3 percent of Barclays Africa Group (BAG), the then majority shareholder of Barclays Bank of Botswana Limited in 2016, decided to divest its majority shareholding in BAG, worth £3.5 billion at that time. In 2017 Barclays reduced its shareholding in BAG to 14.9 percent.

Subsequently, in 2018 BAG re-branded to Absa Group Limited. Under the terms of that re-brand, Absa had until June 2020 to change the names of its subsidiaries in 12 African countries.

Beginning in December 2019, Barclays Bank Botswana Limited began re-branding to Absa Bank Botswana Limited. The re-brand concluded on 10 February 2020, when both the bank's legal and business names became Absa Bank Botswana Limited.

== Governance ==
The bank is supervised by a five-person board of directors, chaired by Oduetse Andrew Motshidisi, one of the non-executive directors. The managing director and CEO is Keabetswe Pheko-Moshagane.

== See also ==
- List of banks in Botswana
- Botswana Stock Exchange
