= Absa Bank Zambia =

Commercial bank in Zambia

Absa Bank Zambia Plc
- Type: Subsidiary of Absa Group Limited
- Industry: Banking
- Founded: January 1, 1918; 108 years ago
- Headquarters: Lusaka, Zambia
- Key people: Newton Barton Young; Ag. Chairman; Mizinga Melu; Managing Director
- Products: Loans, credit cards, savings, investments, mortgages
- Revenue: ▲:Aftertax: ZMW:1,059,376,000 (US$41.95 million) (2020)
- Total assets: ZMW:18,557,608,000 (US$734.86 million) (2020)
- Number of employees: 792
- Website: www.absa.co.zm/personal

Absa Bank Zambia Plc, formerly Barclays Bank of Zambia, is a commercial bank in Zambia. It is licensed by the Bank of Zambia, the central bank and national banking regulator.

== Location ==
The headquarters and main branch of Absa Bank of Zambia are located at 4643 and 4644 Elunda Office Park, Addis Ababa Round About, in the city of Lusaka, Zambia's capital city. The geographical coordinates of the bank's headquarters are: 15°24′49.0″S 28°18′11.0″E

== Overview ==
The bank is a large financial institution in Zambia. The institution serves the banking needs of large corporations, small and medium sized enterprises, individuals and government departments. As of 31 December 2020, the bank's total assets were valued at ZMW:18.558 billion (US$732.86 million), with shareholders' equity of ZMW:1,210,490,000 (US$47.93 million). As of December 2020, the bank employed 792 people in Zambia.

== History ==
According to its website, Barclays Bank has been present in Zambia since 1918. However, the bank was licensed in its present form in 1974. The bank is a member of the Absa Group Limited, which was a subsidiary of Barclays Bank Plc., until June 2017, when Barclays Plc decided to sell down its shares in the group. In March 2018, Barclays Africa Group made a decision to re-brand to Absa Group Limited.

=== Name change ===
In 2016, Barclays Bank Plc, owned 62.3 percent of Barclays Africa Group (BAG). At that time BAG was the parent company of Barclays Bank of Zambia. Barclays decided to divest its majority shareholding in BAG, worth £3.5 billion then. In December 2017, Barclays reduced its shareholding in BAG to 14.9 percent. Following those events, BAG re-branded to Absa Group Limited in 2018. Under the terms of that re-brand, Absa had until June 2020 to change the names of its subsidiaries in 12 African countries.

In Zambia, the re-brand concluded on 10 February 2020, when both the bank's legal and business names became Absa Bank Zambia Plc.

== Branch network ==
As of May 2020, the bank maintained a network of over 47 branches.

== Governance ==
The Ag. Chairman of the Board of Directors of Absa Bank Zambia, is Newton Barton Young. Mizinga Melu, serves as the Managing Director of the bank.

== See also ==
- Economy of Zambia
- List of banks in Zambia
- List of banks in Africa
- Bank of Zambia
- Absa Group Limited
