= Mazabuka District =

Coordinates: 16°00′S 28°00′E

- District
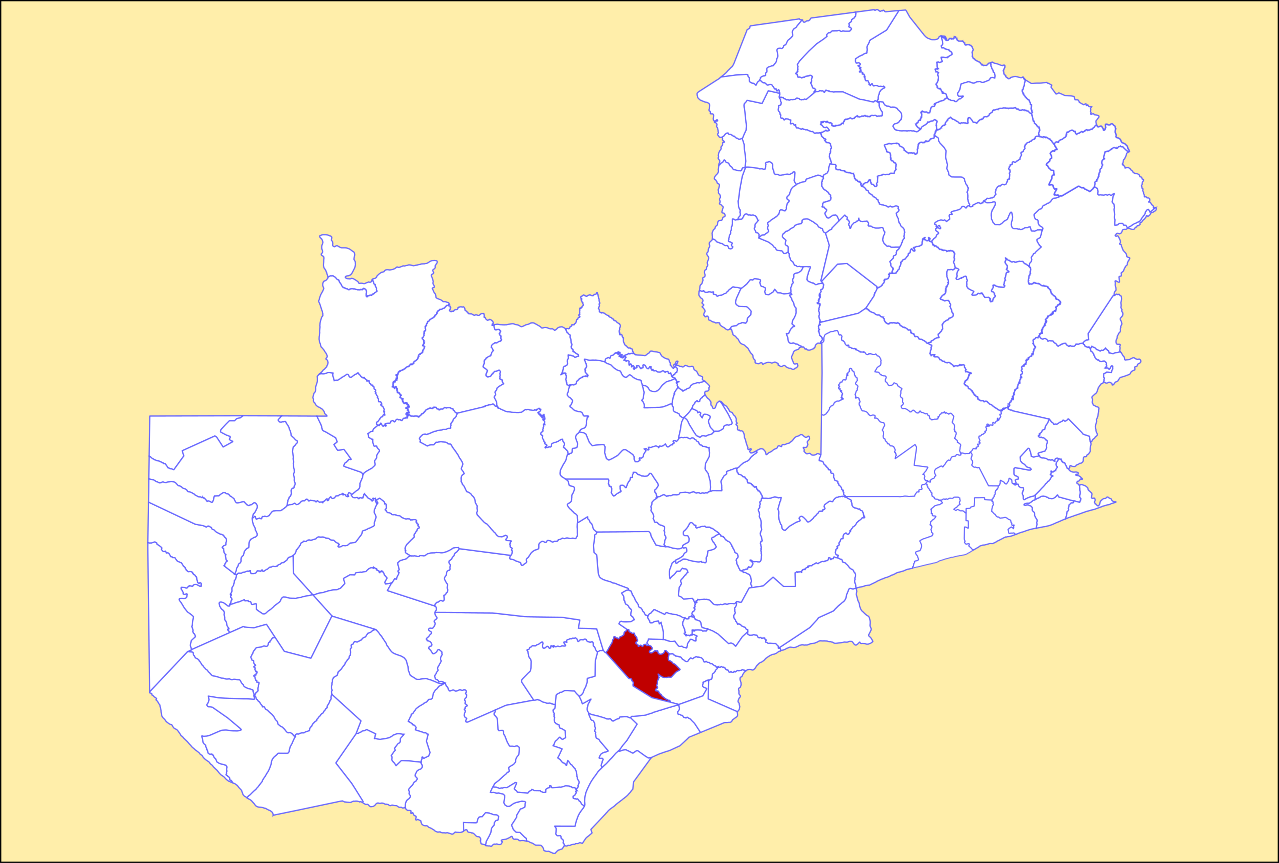
- District location in Zambia
- Country: Zambia
- Province: Southern Province
- Capital: Mazabuka

Area
  - Total: 4,007.5 km^{2} (1,547.3 sq mi)

Population (2022)
  - Total: 232,045
  - Density: 57.903/km^{2} (149.97/sq mi)
- Time zone: UTC+2 (CAT)

Mazabuka District is a district of Zambia, located in Southern Province. The capital lies at Mazabuka. As of the 2000 Zambian Census, the district had a population of 232,045 people.
