= Absa Bank Tanzania =

Commercial bank in Tanzania

Absa Bank Tanzania Limited
- Type: Subsidiary of Absa Group Limited
- Industry: Banking
- Founded: 1925; 101 years ago
- Headquarters: Absa House, Ohio Street, Kivukoni, Dar es Salaam, Tanzania,
- Key people: Obedi Laiser (managing director); Sabiha Gulam (chief operating officer)
- Products: Loans, transaction accounts, savings, investments, debit cards
- Revenue: ▲Aftertax:TSh 1.075 billion (US$650,000) (Q1:2013)
- Total assets: TSh 634.34 billion (US$382 million) (March 2013)
- Number of employees: 490 (2017)
- Parent: Absa Group
- Website: Company website

Absa Bank Tanzania Limited (ABT), formerly Barclays Bank Tanzania Limited, is a commercial bank in Tanzania and a subsidiary of South Africa-based Absa Group Limited. ABT is licensed by the Bank of Tanzania, the country's central bank and national banking regulator.

== Location ==
The headquarters and main branch of Barclays Bank of Tanzania Limited are located in Barclays House, along Ohio Street, in the city of Dar es Salaam, the financial capital and largest city of Tanzania. The geographical coordinates of the bank's headquarters are: 06°48'40.0"S, 39°17'12.0"E (Latitude:-6.811111; Longitude:39.286667).

== Overview ==
ABT is a large financial services provider in Tanzanian, serving large corporations, small-to-medium enterprises, and individuals. As of March 2013, its total assets were valued at about TSh 634.34 billion (US$382 million). As of December 2013, the bank had 87,000 customers and 42 automated teller machines, and maintained 24 networked branches.

== History ==
ABT was established in Tanzania in 1925. In 1967, it was nationalized and converted into the National Bank of Commerce, Tanzania's largest bank by assets. With the liberalization of the economy in the 1990s, Barclays Bank Plc re-entered the country, resuming business in 2000.

As at March 2016, Barclays Bank Plc. was seeking regulatory approval in Tanzania to merge this bank with National Bank of Commerce (Tanzania) in which Barclays (now Absa) maintains 55 percent shareholding.

== Name change ==
In 2016, Barclays Africa Group (BAG) was owned 62.3 percent by Barclays Plc of the United Kingdom. In February that year, Barclays decided to downsize it shareholding in BAG, valued at £3.5 billion, then. In December 2017, Barclays reduced its shareholding in BAG to 14.9 percent.

In 2018, BAG re-branded to Absa Group Limited.Under the terms of that re-brand, Absa has until June 2020 to change the names of its subsidiaries in 12 African countries.

In Tanzania, the re-brand concluded on 11 February 2020, when both the bank's legal and business names became Absa Bank Tanzania Limited.

== Branch network ==
As of May 2023, the bank maintained a network of 15 branches at the following locations:

1. Ohio Street Branch - Barclays House, Ohio Street, Dar es Salaam (main branch)
2. Slipway Branch - Msasani, Dar es Salaam
3. Alpha House Branch - New Bagamoyo Road, Dar es Salaam
4. Mikocheni Branch - Old Bagamoyo Road, Mikocheni, Dar es Salaam
5. Pugu Branch - Nyerere Road, Dar es Salaam
6. City Mall Branch - City Mall, Dar es Salaam
7. Arusha Sopa Plaza Branch - Sopa Plaza, Serengeti Road, Arusha
8. Mbeya Branch - Mwanjelwa, Mbeya
9. Morogoro Branch - Lumumba Road, Morogoro
10. Moshi Branch - Mawenzi Road, Moshi
11. Dodoma Branch - Madukani Road, Dodoma
12. Iringa Branch - Iringa
13. Mwanza City Centre Branch - Rock City Mall, Mwanza
14. Tanga Branch - King Street, Tanga
15. Zanzibar Main Branch - Zanzibar State Trading Corporation Building, Zanzibar

== See also ==
- List of banks in Tanzania
- List of banks in Africa
