= Maria Ramos (businesswoman) =

South African economist and businesswoman

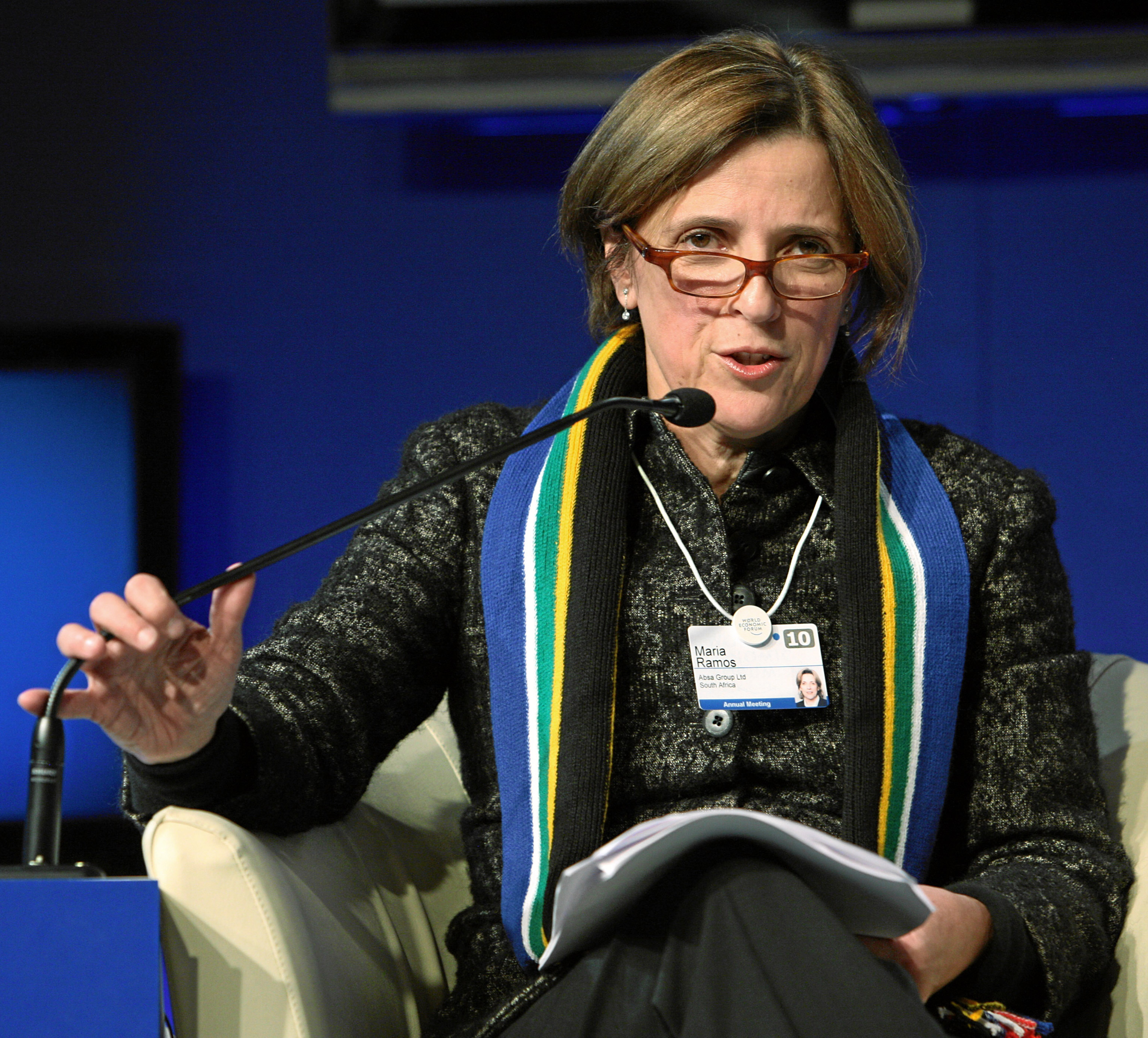
- Ramos at Davos in 2010
- Born: 22 February 1959 (age 67); Lisbon, Portugal
- Citizenship: South Africa, Portugal
- Education: University of the Witwatersrand; University of London
- Occupations: Businesswoman; civil servant; economist
- Years active: 1987–present
- Spouse: Trevor Manuel (m. 2008)

Maria da Conceição das Neves Calha Ramos (born 1959) is a South African businesswoman and former civil servant. She has been the group chair of Standard Chartered since May 2025.

Ramos was the chief executive officer of the Absa Group from 2009 to 2019, during which time she oversaw the company's unbundling from Barclays. An economist by training, she was the director-general of the South African National Treasury from 1996 to 2004, and the chief executive officer of Transnet from 2004 to 2009. She left Absa in 2019 to retire, but nonetheless was chairperson of AngloGold Ashanti from 2020 to 2024.

== Early life and career ==
Ramos was born in Lisbon, Portugal on 22 February 1959. She was the eldest of four daughters and her parents emigrated to Mozambique and then, when Ramos was six years old, to Vereeniging, South Africa. Her family was working class; her father was a bricklayer.

After high school she worked at a Barclays branch in Vereeniging as a waste clerk, saving money for her university tuition. She also received scholarship money from Barclays, becoming the first woman to receive the bank's formerly male-only scholarship. After completing an Institute of Bankers diploma in 1983, she attended the University of the Witwatersrand, completing an Bachelor of Commerce in 1986 and a degree in economics in 1987. While a student in Johannesburg, she became involved in the anti-apartheid movement.

Between 1989 and 1995 she worked as an academic economist, as a lecturer at the University of South Africa from 1989 to 1991, a lecturer at the University of the Witwatersrand from 1991 to 1994, and a research officer at the London School of Economics from 1994 to 1995. During this time she completed a master's degree in economics at the University of London in 1992, and from 1990 to 1994 she was an economist in the economic planning department of the African National Congress (ANC), which was then engaged in the negotiations to end apartheid. During the post-apartheid transition she worked on the constitutional negotiations and on the Transitional Executive Council's subcommittee on finance.

== Career in the public sector ==
=== National Treasury: 1995–2004 ===
In May 1995, Ramos joined the post-apartheid South African government as deputy director-general for financial planning in the National Treasury. Minister of Finance Trevor Manuel became the political head of the treasury in April 1996, and on 3 July 1996 the cabinet approved Ramos's appointment as director-general of finance with immediate effect. By 1999, the Mail & Guardian described Ramos and Manuel as among "the most influential and powerful people" in government, commenting that, "Ramos is boss. Manuel is boss only when others need him to be." The opposition Democratic Alliance were among her admirers.

Though she was initially appointed on a five-year contract, the cabinet approved a three-year extension of her term in June 2001. However, in September 2003, Ramos announced that she would leave the treasury in January 2004 to succeed Mafika Mkwanazi as group chief executive officer of Transnet. Lesetja Kganyago was appointed to replace her as director-general.

=== Transnet: 2004–2009 ===
Six months after her arrival at Transnet, in August 2004, Ramos announced a proposal for a major restructuring of the Transnet Group, supported by Public Enterprises Minister Alec Erwin. The restructuring included unbundling South African Airways from the group and divesting from various minor subsidiaries. Ramos also pursued the privatisation of various Transnet property interests, including the V & A Waterfront, and announced a rebranding strategy for the utility in 2007.

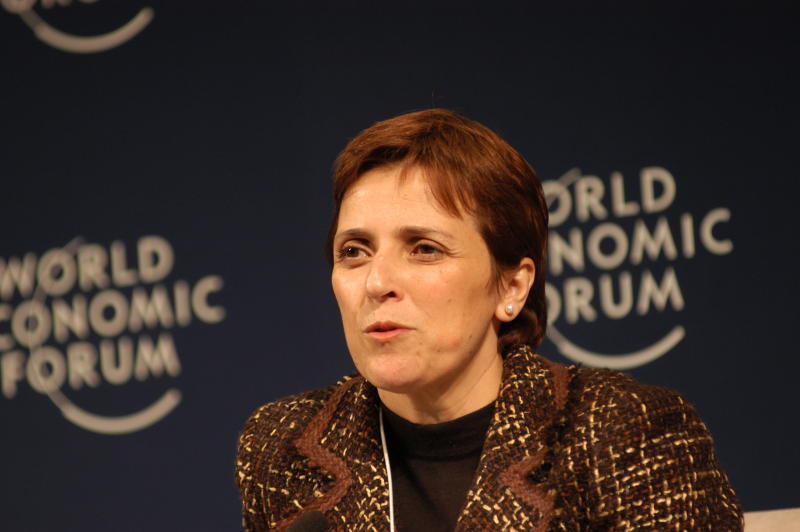
Ramos at the World Economic Forum in January 2009

Because of her role at Transnet, Empowerdex labelled Ramos the second most economically influential woman in South Africa, after Deputy President Phumzile Mlambo-Ngcuka, in 2005. She was also reportedly the highest-paid woman executive in the country. She spent five years at the utility; in November 2008, she announced that she would leave at the end of February 2009.

== Career in the private sector ==
In March 2009, Ramos succeeded Steve Booysen as chief executive of Absa Group, one of South Africa's largest banking conglomerates. She became the top-paid executive in South Africa's banking industry. Absa Group subsumed Barclays Africa's operations in 2013, but in 2015 Barclays chief executive Jes Staley announced that Barclays, Absa's British parent company, planned to sell most of its majority stake in Absa. Ramos negotiated and oversaw the subsequent unbundling.

On 29 January 2019, Ramos announced that she would leave Absa at the end of February 2019, retiring upon her 60th birthday. South African press speculated that she would be appointed as head of the South African Revenue Service or even as Minister of Finance, and the incumbent Finance Minister Tito Mboweni said that she was being considered for appointment as chief reorganisation officer at Eskom.

Ramos was appointed as a director at AngloGold Ashanti in June 2019, and on 8 December 2020 she was appointed as chairperson of the company's board. She replaced Sipho Pityana with immediate effect. She held the position for three-and-a-half years, handing over to Jochen Tilk at an annual general meeting on 28 May 2024.

She has been an independent director of Standard Chartered and Standard Chartered Bank since 1 January 2021. In February 2025 it was announced that Ramos would succeed José Viñals as Chair of Standard Chartered, effective May 2025. She has also been a non-executive director at Richemont since 2011, though the company announced in 2023 that she would resign from the board on 31 March 2025. She has been an independent director at Sanlam, SABMiller, the Saudi British Bank, and Remgro Limited.

== Other activities ==
Appointed by António Guterres, Ramos and Achim Steiner co-chaired the United Nations Task Force on Digital Financing of Sustainable Development Goals from 2018 to 2020. In 2021, she was appointed to the World Bank–International Monetary Fund High-Level Advisory Group on Sustainable and Inclusive Recovery and Growth, co-chaired by Mari Pangestu, Ceyla Pazarbasioglu, and Nicholas Stern. Between 2019 and 2021, she was a member of the interim board of the South African Public Investment Corporation.

In 2020, she was appointed as a member of the global advisory council of the Bretton Woods Committee, and she is a member of the international advisory board of Oxford University's Blavatnik School of Government. She has also been chairperson of the Banking Association of South Africa, a member of the executive committee of the World Economic Forum's International Business Council, and a member of the executive committee of Business Leadership South Africa. While Absa chief executive, she was a member of the Group of Thirty.

== Honours ==
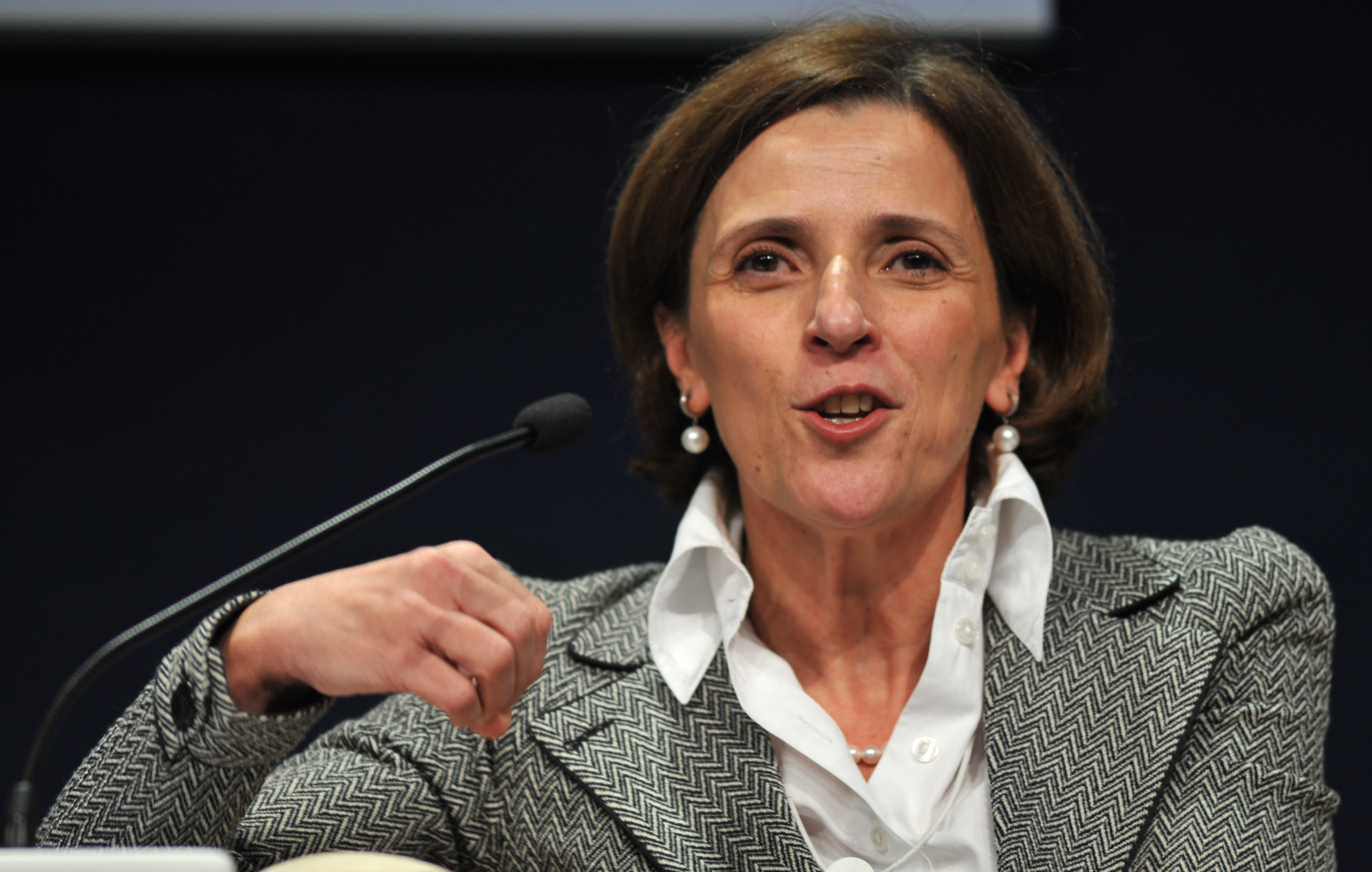
Ramos at the World Economic Forum on Africa in Cape Town in June 2009

A recipient of honorary doctorates from the University of the Free State and Stellenbosch University, Ramos was named Businesswoman of the Year by the South African Businesswoman's Association in 2001 and Business Leader of the Year by the Sunday Times in 2005. She received African Business's Outstanding Businesswoman of the Year Award in 2009, the Wits Business School's Management Excellence Award in 2010, and CNBC's Africa Woman Leader of the Year Award in 2011. She has often been ranked in Fortune's list of most powerful women, as well as in its Forbes counterpart; in 2017, she was the only African on the Forbes 100 Most Powerful Women ranking.

== Personal life ==
Ramos married South African politician Trevor Manuel on 27 December 2008. The ceremony was held at L'Ormarins, Anton Rupert's wine estate in Franschhoek. Manuel was widely rumoured to have had an extramarital affair with Ramos when they worked together at the National Treasury.

Preceded by Mkwanazi, M.	Chief Executive Officer of Transnet; 2004-2009	Succeeded by Molefe, B.
