= Wendy Lucas-Bull =

South African businesswoman, banker and executive (born 1953)

- Born: 11 September 1953 (age 72); Johannesburg, South Africa
- Citizenship: South African
- Education: University of the Witwatersrand (Bachelor of Science)
- Occupations: Businesswoman and banker
- Years active: 1974; 52 years ago
- Title: Chairperson of Shoprite Holdings
- Term: 2020; 6 years ago
- Predecessor: None

Wendy Elizabeth Lucas-Bull (née Adair; born 11 September 1953) is a South African businesswoman, banker and corporate executive, who has served as a senior executive for numerous large South African companies, including holding the position of Chairperson of major South African financial services group Absa until 2022.

Among the other positions she has held are CEO of FirstRand Retail, Executive Director of Rand Merchant Bank Holdings, and serving as an international partner at Andersen Consulting. She has also served in non-executive directorships at companies including Barclays, Nedbank, Anglo American Platinum, Lafarge, Telkom, Eskom, Discovery, and the Development Bank of Southern Africa.

She is currently Chairperson of South Africa's largest retail company by revenue, Shoprite Holdings, a position she has held since 2020.

== Background ==
Wendy was born in Johannesburg, South Africa, on 11 September 1953, to William George Adair and Lilian Flora O'Leary. She graduated with a Bachelor of Science degree from the University of the Witwatersrand, in 1974.

== Career ==
After graduating university, she joined the Chamber of Mines Research Labs from 1975 until 1976 as an Operations Research Analyst. In 1977 she went to London, joining Shell International as an Operations Research consultant until 1978. She joined Anderson Consulting in 1978 based in Johannesburg and London, leaving as a partner in 1994.

Prior to her appointment as chairman of the Absa Group in 2013, Lucas-Bull served as executive director of Rand Merchant Investment Holdings from 1995, before she served as the CEO of First Rand's retail division.

Wendy is one of the four founders and board members of the Peotona Group. Previous leadership positions in business include as non-executive directorships at Barclays, Anglo American Platinum Limited, the Development Bank of Southern Africa, Alexander Forbes, Eskom, Nedbank, Telkom, Aveng, Lafarge Industries, the South African Financial Markets Advisory Board, Discovery Holdings, Dimension Data Plc and the Momentum Group.

== Other consideration ==
Lucas-Bull has served in the past, as a member of the President’s Advisory Council on Black Economic Empowerment.
