= Absa Bank =

Commercial bank in South Africa

Absa Bank Limited

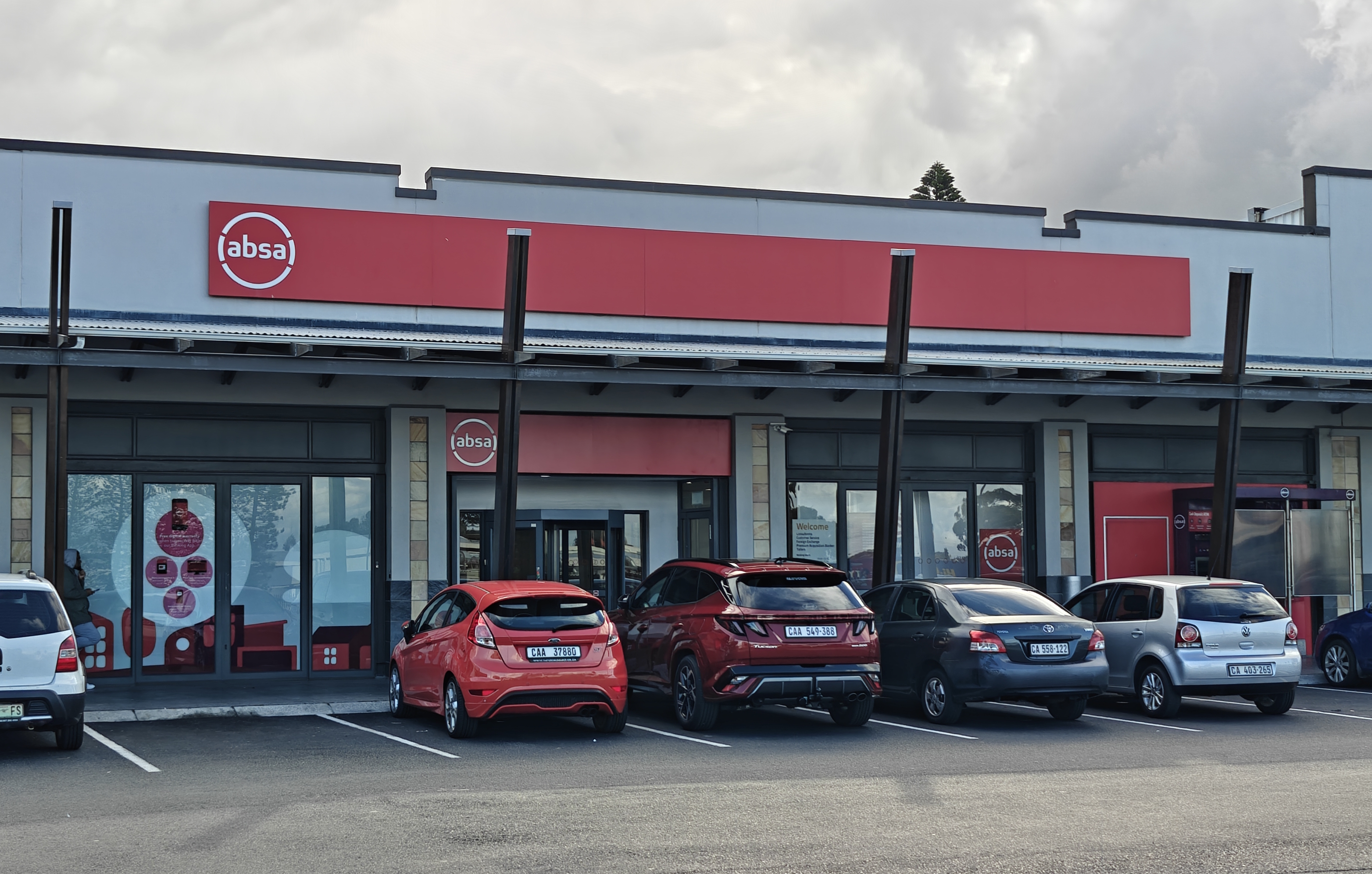
- ABSA Branch in Tokai, Cape Town
- Formerly: Amalgamated Banks of South Africa
- Type: Subsidiary
- Industry: Financial services
- Founded: 1986; 40 years ago
- Headquarters: 7th Floor, Absa Towers West; 15 Troye Street, Johannesburg, Gauteng, South Africa 26.20585726°S 28.04899148°E
- Number of locations: 630 branches and 5,016 ATMs (2025)
- Area served: South Africa
- Key people: René van Wyk (Chairman); Kenny Fihla (CEO)
- Products: Checking accounts Savings; Investments; Loans
- Revenue: ▲ R72.32 billion (2025)
- Operating income: ▼ R13.46 billion (2025)
- Net income: ▼ R11.39 billion (2025)
- Total assets: ▲ R1.95 trillion (2025)
- Total equity: ▲ R139 billion (2025)
- Number of employees: 26,565 (2025)
- Parent: Absa Group Limited
- Website: absa.co.za

Absa Bank Limited, commonly referred to as Absa and formerly known as the Amalgamated Banks of South Africa, is a major commercial bank in South Africa and the flagship bank of Absa Group. As with all commercial banks, it is licensed by the Reserve Bank of South Africa - the central bank and national banking regulator. Headquartered in Johannesburg, Gauteng, Absa is publicly-traded, and listed on the JSE Limited.

As of December 2025, Absa operates 630 branches, over 5,000 ATMs, and over 90,000 point of sale systems across South Africa. The company employs over 26,000 people in SA.

== History ==
According to the archives maintained by Barclays Bank Plc, Amalgamated Banks of South Africa Limited was incorporated in 1986, by "the merger of UBS (United Building Society) Holdings, the Allied and Volkskas Groups, and certain interests of the Sage Group".

In 1992, Absa acquired the entire shareholding of the Bankorp Group, which included TrustBank, Senbank and Bankfin. The name of the bank's holding company was changed to Absa Group Limited in 1997.

In 2005, Barclays acquired a 62.3 percent majority stake in ABSA, and Barclays' existing subsidiary in South Africa and Barclays Capital's business were subsequently operated under the Absa brand. Twelve other financial subsidiaries in 11 sub-Saharan African countries were made part of the group. Absa Group changed its name to Barclays Africa Group.

In 2016, Barclays Bank Plc, which owned 62.3 percent of Barclays Africa Group (BAG), the then parent company of Absa Bank Limited (the South African subsidiary), decided to divest its majority shareholding in BAG, worth £3.5 billion at that time.

In 2017, Barclays reduced its shareholding in BAG to 14.9 percent. After that, BAG re-branded to Absa Group Limited in 2018. Under the terms of that re-brand, Absa had until June 2020 to change the names of its subsidiaries in 12 African countries.

== See also ==
- Banking in South Africa
- List of banks in South Africa
