= Absa Group =

South African banking conglomerate

- Logo used since 2018
- Formerly: Amalgamated Banks of South Africa (ABSA) (1991–2005); Barclays Africa Group Limited (2005–2018)
- Type: Public
- Traded as: JSE: ABG
- Industry: Banking; Financial services; Investment services; Insurance services
- Founded: 1986; 40 years ago
- Headquarters: Johannesburg, South Africa
- Area served: Botswana; Ghana; Kenya; Mauritius; Mozambique; Namibia; Nigeria; Seychelles; South Africa; Tanzania; Uganda; Zambia
- Key people: René van Wyk (Group Chairman); Kenny Fihla (Ag. Group CEO)
- Products: Commercial banking; Financial services; Retail banking; Credit cards; Private equity; Investment management; Investment banking
- Revenue: ▲ R 109.95 billion (2024)
- Operating income: ▲ R 95.65 billion (2024)
- Net income: ▲ R 30.65 billion (2024)
- Total assets: ▲ R 2.07 trillion (2024)
- Total equity: ▲ R 183.28 billion (2024)
- Number of employees: 36,779 (2024)
- Subsidiaries: List of subsidiaries
- Website: www.absa.africa

Absa Group Limited, commonly known and stylized simply as absa (formerly the Amalgamated Banks of South Africa (ABSA) until 2005 and Barclays Africa Group Limited until 2018), is a multinational banking and financial services conglomerate based in Johannesburg, South Africa and listed on the Johannesburg Stock Exchange. It offers personal and business banking, credit cards, corporate and investment banking, wealth and investment management and bank assurances.

Operating in 10 Sub-Saharan African countries including in-house South Africa, Botswana, Ghana, Kenya, Mauritius, Mozambique, Seychelles, Tanzania, Uganda and Zambia, the conglomerate maintains representative offices in Namibia and Nigeria and internationals offices in London and New York City, as well as a technology support office in the Czech Republic. Absa had assets of R1.9 trillion as of June 2024.

Absa Group Limited recently announced that its board of directors has appointed Kenny Fihla, a senior financial services executive with 20 years of experience, as its new Group Chief Executive Officer, effective 17 June 2025, and subject to regulatory approval.

== History ==
=== Formation of ABSA and Barclays Africa Group Limited (1991–2017) ===
Absa Group began with the incorporation Amalgamated Banks of South Africa (ABSA) Limited in 1986 from a merger of the United Building Society Holdings South Africa, Allied Bank South Africa, Volkskas Bank Group and certain interests of the Sage Group. In 1992, ABSA acquired the entire shareholding of the Bankorp Group (which included TrustBank, Senbank and Bankfin). In 1997, ABSA changed the name of the holding company to ABSA Group Limited and adopted a new corporate identity. It consisted of four main operating divisions, whose brands; "United", "Volkskas", "Allied" and "TrustBank" brands were retired the following year in favor of the ABSA brand.

In May 2005, Barclays of the United Kingdom purchased 56.4 percent stake in Absa, which was criticized by the then-governor of the South African Reserve Bank, Tito Mboweni, who said he "had yet to see the benefits of Barclays' management of Absa". With the acquisition, Absa Group Limited was rebranded as Barclays Africa Group Limited.

=== eBank charges (2005-2012) ===
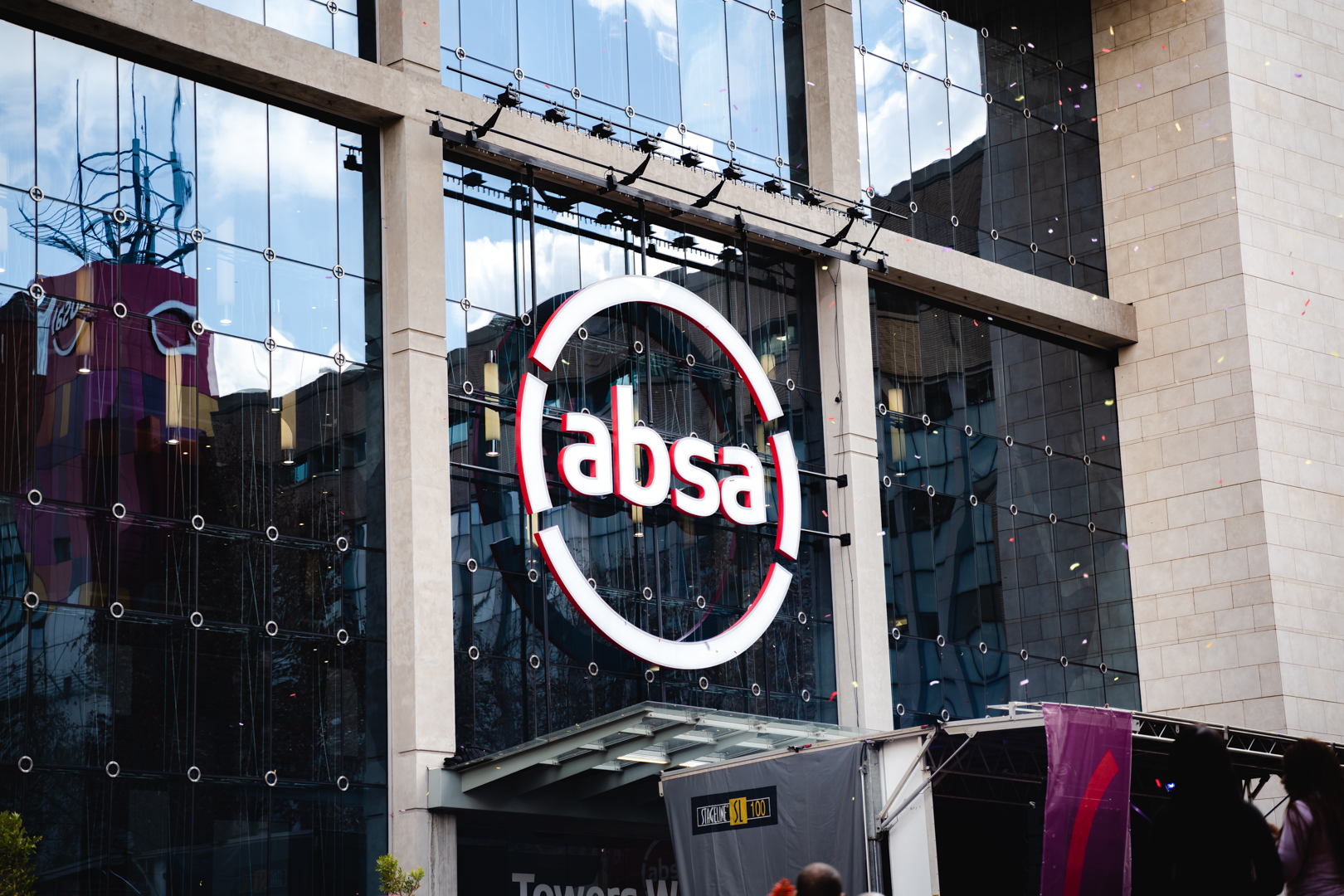
Absa Group in Johannesburg, South Africa, 2018

Finweek Bank Charges Reports from 2008 through 2010 found Barclays Africa Group Holdings Limited to be the most expensive bank in South Africa. Pay-as-you-transact (PAYT) fees increased 82 percent from 2005 to 2010. The 2012, Finweek Bank Charges Report ranked Absa's Gold Value Bundle as the cheapest package option amongst the four banks that were compared. The report has also shown Absa's PAYT pricing structure to have reduced by 25 percent by 2013, leaving it third cheapest in the overall ranking at that time.

In 2013, the group acquired the entire issued share capital of Barclays Africa Limited and issued 129,540,636 consideration shares to Barclays Africa Group Holdings Limited (a wholly owned subsidiary of Barclays) thus increasing the shareholding of Barclays plc to 62.3 percent. The Consideration Shares were listed on the JSE from the commencement of trading on 31 July 2013. The name change from "Absa Group Limited" to "Barclays Africa Group Limited" was completed in August 2013.

In 2017, the South African Public Protector, Busisiwe Mkhwebane, found that the bailout of R1.125 billion that Absa's predecessor Bankorp Group had received between 1985 and 1992 from the Reserve Bank was illegal, and recommended that Absa be forced to pay back R2.25 billion, the current equivalent of the amount. The report was set aside by the Pretoria High Court, finding that "The public protector did not conduct herself in a manner which would be expected from a person occupying the office of the public protector." The court assessed some costs of the case personally against Mkhwebane due to her conduct, an order upheld by the Constitutional Court of South Africa in July 2019.

=== Absa Group Limited (2018-present) ===
Barclays Bank Plc in 2018 owned 14.9 percent of Absa Group Limited. In March 2018, Barclays Africa announced the group's name would revert to Absa Group Limited, effective 30 May 2018. The company underwent rebranding in 2018, inclusive of a new logo and slogans.

Absa opened an international office in London in September 2018, then in 2019, opened another international office in New York City. As of October 2019, according to Club of Mozambique, Absa Group Limited had total assets in excess of R1.9 trillion as of June 2024. ABGL in 2020 was the majority shareholder of 11 banks located in Botswana, Ghana, Kenya, Mauritius, Mozambique, Seychelles, South Africa, Tanzania (two entities), Uganda and Zambia. In March 2022, Sello Moloko was appointed group chairman and Arrie Rautenbach was appointed CEO, and its fourth CEO in three years. The company had been without a CEO for eleven months after the abrupt resignation of Daniel Mminele. In August 2022, Barclays Plc sold its remaining stake in Absa, which it had acquired in 2005, selling 7.4 percent of Absa's issued capital for $620 million.

== Overview and structure ==
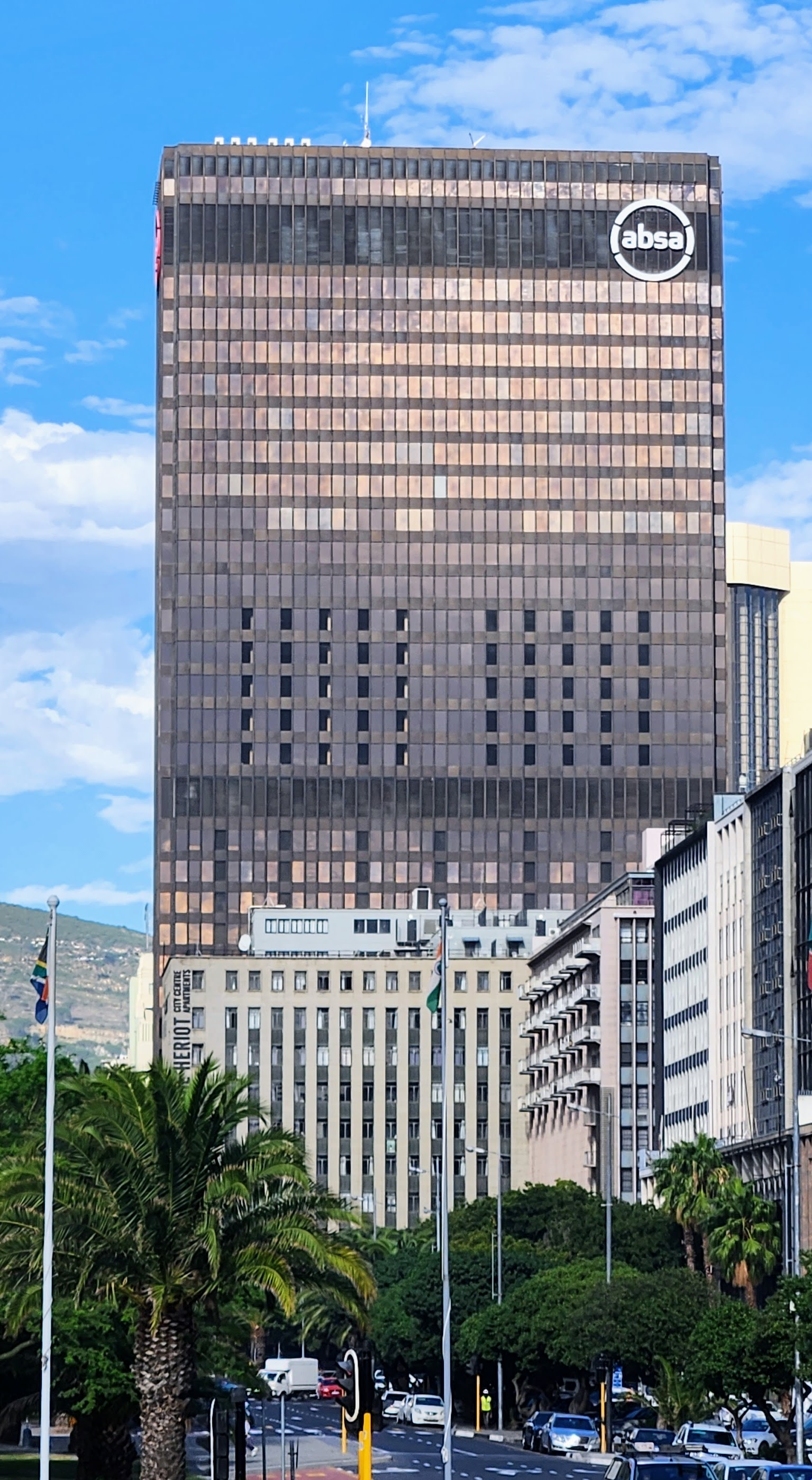
ABSA Center on Heerengracht Street, in Foreshore, Cape Town

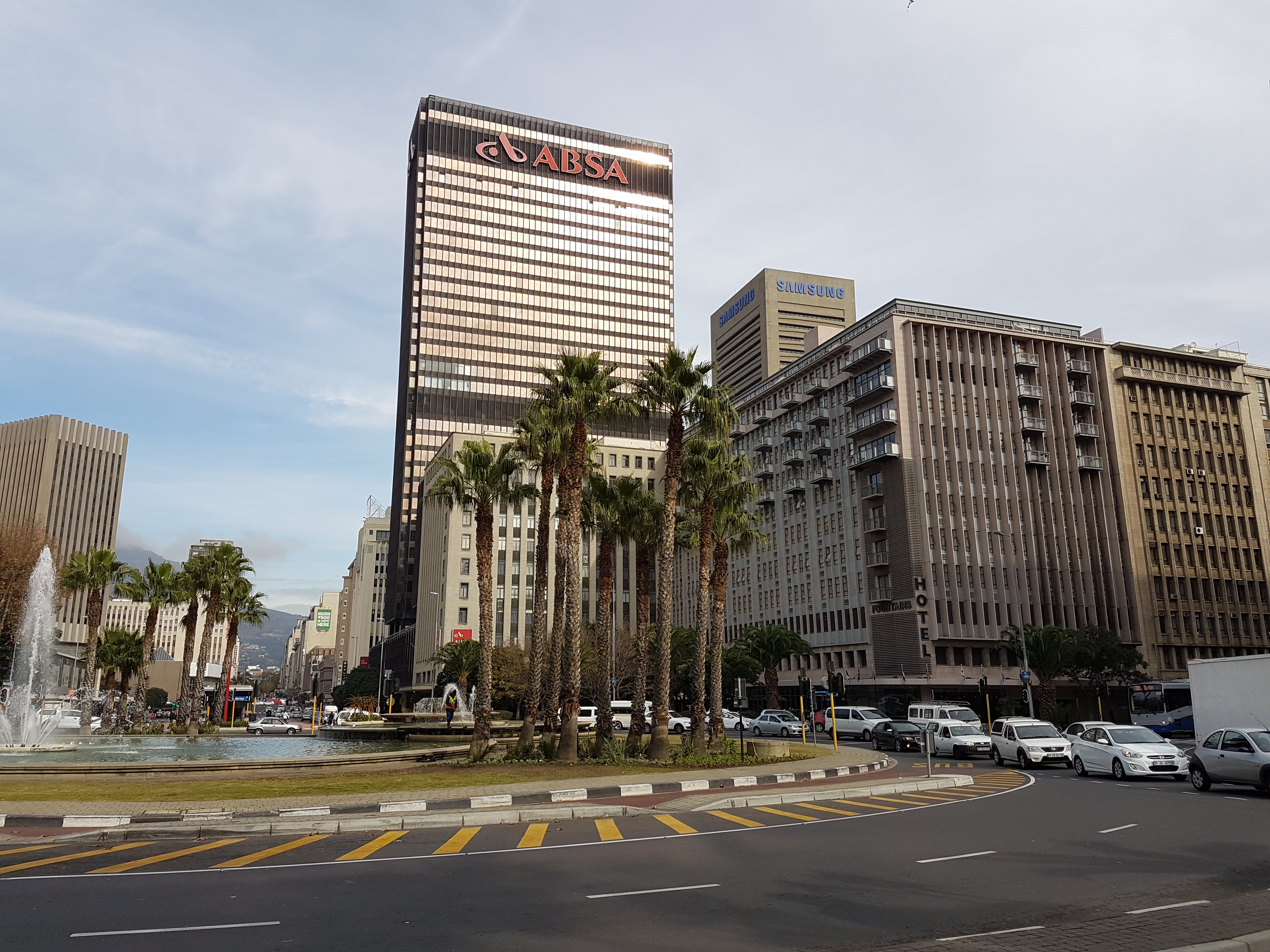
ABSA's old branding, shown on the ABSA Center in Cape Town before the signage was replaced

Absa Group Limited's shares are listed on the JSE Limited stock exchange. In 2020, Absa Bank Kenya and Absa Bank Botswana continue to be listed on their respective stock exchanges.

=== Major shareholders ===
Below is the Absa Group's 10 largest shareholders as at June 2023:

Current majority shareholders	June 2023 (%)
Public Investment Corporation (SA)	5.15
BlackRock, Inc. (US, UK)	4.98
M&G (US, UK)	4.96
Ninety One (SA)	4.68
Old Mutual (SA)	4.40
Citigroup Global Markets	4.02
The Vanguard Group (US, AU)	3.94
Investec Securities (SA)	3.89
Sanlam Investment Management (SA)	3.32
Others	60.66

Geographical holding (by owner)	June 2023 (%)
United Kingdom	7.52
South Africa	61.66
United States and Canada	19.32
Other countries	11

=== Subsidiaries ===
- Absa Bank Limited (100%)
- Absa Financial Services Limited (100%)
- Absa Bank Botswana (67.8%)
- Absa Bank Ghana (100%)
- Absa Bank Kenya (68.5%)
- Absa Bank Mauritius (100%)
- Absa Bank Mozambique (98.1%)
- Absa Bank Seychelles (99.8%)
- Absa Bank Uganda (100%)
- Absa Bank Zambia (100%)
- National Bank of Commerce Limited (55%)
- Absa Bank Tanzania (100%)

== Legal matters ==
=== Mortgage loans misconduct ===
In South Africa, banks must secure consent from the borrower if the bank wishes to securitise the loan, allowing the bank to bundle in the loan with other loans and sell it to new owners.

In 2014, South African courts made a number of rulings against Absa's mortgage loan division in a number of previous summary judgements against clients who had taken out loans with the bank and who the bank had accused of defaulting on their loans. In August 2014, Absa brought a case against James Grobbelaar and Kevin Jenzen for allegedly defaulting on their home loans. However, Absa was unable to provide proof of the loan agreements, claiming that they had been destroyed in a fire in 2009 and instead presented an unsigned blank loan agreement.

In November 2014, Absa withdrew a similar case it had brought in the North Gauteng High Court against Emmarentia and Monica Liebenberg for allegedly defaulting on loans taken out in 2007, with the bank being unable to provide a copy of the signed documents that the bank claimed to be the loan agreement they were enforcing. The Liebenberg's accused the bank of trying to bully them "into submission, by threatening legal costs and expenses and by pursuing a wrongful summary judgement application knowing full well the massive disputes involved". The Liebenbergs also stated in their affidavit that the bank had inflated the interest rate of the loan and charged additional fees that had never been agreed to and would have been illegal even if they had been written into a signed agreement.

== See also ==
- List of companies traded on the JSE
- List of companies of South Africa
- List of banks
- List of banks in South Africa
- Economy of South Africa
