= List of schools in Norway =

Schools in Norway are usually divided into the following categories: elementary schools (barneskole) for 1st to 7th grade, lower secondary schools (ungdomsskole) for 8th to 10th grade, upper secondary schools (videregående skole) for 11th to 13th grade, colleges (høgskole), and universities (universitet). The common name for schools with grades 1 through 10 is grunnskole.

This is an incomplete list of schools in Norway:

== Upper secondary schools ==
=== Akershus ===
| School | Location |
|---|---|
| Asker School of Arts | Asker Municipality |
| Asker videregående skole | Asker Municipality |
| Bjertnes videregående skole | Nittedal Municipality |
| Bjørkelangen videregående skole | Aurskog-Høland Municipality |
| Bleiker videregående skole | Asker Municipality |
| Drømtorp videregående skole | Nordre Follo Municipality |
| Dønski videregående skole | Bærum Municipality |
| Eidsvoll videregående skole | Eidsvoll Municipality |
| Eikeli videregående skole | Bærum Municipality |
| Frogn videregående skole | Frogn Municipality |
| Holmen videregående skole | Asker Municipality |
| Hvam videregående skole | Nes Municipality |
| Jessheim videregående skole | Ullensaker Municipality |
| Kjelle videregående skole | Aurskog-Høland Municipality |
| Lillestrøm videregående skole | Lillestrøm Municipality |
| Lørenskog videregående skole | Lørenskog Municipality |
| Mailand videregående skole | Lørenskog Municipality |
| Nadderud videregående skole | Bærum Municipality |
| Nannestad videregående skole | Nannestad Municipality |
| Nes videregående skole | Nes Municipality |
| Nesbru videregående skole | Asker Municipality |
| Nesodden videregående skole | Nesodden Municipality |
| Roald Amundsen videregående skole | Nordre Follo Municipality |
| Rosenvilde videregående skole | Bærum Municipality |
| Rud videregående skole | Bærum Municipality |
| Rælingen videregående skole | Rælingen Municipality |
| Røyken videregående skole | Asker Municipality |
| Sandvika videregående skole | Bærum Municipality |
| Skedsmo videregående skole | Lillestrøm Municipality |
| Ski videregående skole | Nordre Follo Municipality |
| Stabekk videregående skole | Bærum Municipality |
| Steinerskolen i Bærum | Bærum Municipality |
| Steinerskolen på Nesodden | Nesodden Municipality |
| Strømmen videregående skole | Lillestrøm Municipality |
| Sørumsand videregående skole | Lillestrøm Municipality |
| Valler videregående skole | Bærum Municipality |
| Vestby videregående skole | Vestby Municipality |
| Ås videregående skole | Ås Municipality |

=== Agder ===
| School | Location |
|---|---|
| Academy of Commerce - Arendal | Arendal Municipality |
| Academy of Commerce - Kristiansand | Kristiansand Municipality |
| Arendal videregående skole | Arendal Municipality |
| Byremo videregående skole | Lyngdal Municipality |
| Dahlske videregående skole | Grimstad Municipality |
| Drottningborg videregående skole | Grimstad Municipality |
| Eilert Sundt videregående skole | Farsund Municipality |
| Flekkefjord videregående skole | Flekkefjord Municipality |
| Kristen videregående skole Bygland (KVS Bygland) | Bygland Municipality |
| Kristen videregående skole Sør (KVS Lyngdal) | Lyngdal Municipality |
| Kristiansand katedralskole | Kristiansand Municipality |
| Kristiansand tekniske fagskole | Kristiansand Municipality |
| Kvadraturen videregående skole | Kristiansand Municipality |
| Lillesand videregående skole | Lillesand Municipality |
| Mandal videregående skole | Lindesnes Municipality |
| Risør videregående skole | Risør Municipality |
| Sam Eyde videregående skole | Arendal Municipality |
| Setesdal videregående skole | Evje og Hornnes Municipality |
| Sirdal videregående skole | Sirdal Municipality |
| Sonans Kristiansand | Kristiansand Municipality |
| Søgne videregående skole | Kristiansand Municipality |
| Sørlandets maritime videregående skole | Kristiansand Municipality |
| Tangen videregående skole | Kristiansand Municipality |
| Tvedestrand videregående skole | Tvedestrand Municipality |
| Valle videregående skole | Valle Municipality |
| Vennesla videregående skole | Vennesla Municipality |
| Vågsbygd videregående skole | Kristiansand Municipality |

=== Buskerud ===
| School | Location |
|---|---|
| Academy of Commerce - Drammen | Drammen Municipality |
| Buskerud videregående skole | Modum Municipality |
| Drammen videregående skole | Drammen Municipality |
| Eiker videregående skole | Øvre Eiker Municipality |
| Gol videregående skole | Gol Municipality |
| Hønefoss videregående skole | Ringerike Municipality |
| Kongsberg videregående skole | Kongsberg Municipality |
| Lier videregående skole | Lier Municipality |
| NTG - Geilo | Hol Municipality |
| Numedal videregående skole | Nore og Uvdal Municipality |
| Ringerike videregående skole | Ringerike Municipality |
| Sonans Videregående | Drammen Municipality |
| St. Hallvard videregående skole | Lier Municipality |
| Tyrifjord videregående skole | Hole Municipality |
| Ål videregående skole | Ål Municipality |
| Åssiden videregående skole | Drammen Municipality |

=== Finnmark ===
| School | Location |
|---|---|
| Båtsfjord private videregående skole as | Båtsfjord Municipality |
| Alta videregående skole | Alta Municipality |
| Deanu joatkkaskuvla Tana videregående skole | Tana Municipality |
| Hammerfest videregående skole | Hammerfest Municipality |
| Kirkenes videregående skole | Sør-Varanger Municipality |
| Lakselv videregående skole | Porsanger Municipality |
| Nordkapp videregående skole | Nordkapp Municipality |
| Sámi joatkkaskuvla Samisk videregående skole | Karasjok Municipality |
| Sami joatkkaskuvla ja boazodoalloskuvla Samisk videregående skole og reindriftskole | Kautokeino Municipality |
| Vadsø videregående skole | Vadsø Municipality |
| Vardø videregående skole | Vardø Municipality |

=== Innlandet ===
| School | Location |
|---|---|
| Academy of Commerce - Hamar | Hamar Municipality |
| Dokka videregående skole | Nordre Land Municipality |
| Elverum videregående skole | Elverum Municipality |
| Gausdal videregående skole | Gausdal Municipality |
| Gjøvik tekniske fagskole | Gjøvik Municipality |
| Gjøvik videregående skole | Gjøvik Municipality |
| Hadeland videregående skole | Gran Municipality |
| Hamar katedralskole | Hamar Municipality |
| Jønsberg Upper Secondary School | Stange Municipality |
| Lena-Valle videregående skole | Østre Toten Municipality |
| Lillehammer videregående skole | Lillehammer Municipality |
| MFSG - Gjøvik School of Marketing | Gjøvik Municipality |
| Nord-Gudbrandsdal videregående skole | Sel Municipality |
| Nord-Østerdal videregående skole | Tynset Municipality |
| NTG - Kongsvinger | Kongsvinger Municipality |
| NTG - Lillehammer | Lillehammer Municipality |
| Raufoss videregående skole | Vestre Toten Municipality |
| Ringsaker videregående skole | Ringsaker Municipality |
| Sentrum videregående skole | Kongsvinger Municipality |
| Skarnes videregående skole | Sør-Odal Municipality |
| Solør videregående skole | Åsnes Municipality |
| Sonans Lillehammer | Lillehammer Municipality |
| Stange videregående skole | Stange Municipality |
| Steinerskolen på Hedmarken | Stange Municipality |
| Storhamar videregående skole | Hamar Municipality |
| Storsteigen videregående skole | Alvdal Municipality |
| Trysil videregående skole | Trysil Municipality |
| Valdres vidaregåande skule | Nord-Aurdal Municipality |
| Vinstra videregående skole | Nord-Fron Municipality |
| Øvrebyen videregående skole | Kongsvinger Municipality |

=== Møre og Romsdal ===
| School | Location |
|---|---|
| Atlanten videregående skole | Kristiansund Municipality |
| Bjørknes Private School | Ålesund Municipality |
| Borgund videregående skole | Ålesund Municipality |
| Gjermundnes videregående skole | Vestnes Municipality |
| Haram videregående skole | Haram Municipality |
| Herøy videregående skole | Herøy Municipality |
| Hustadvika videregående skole | Hustadvika Municipality |
| Kristiansund videregående skole | Kristiansund Municipality |
| Molde School of Culture | Molde Municipality |
| Molde videregående skole | Molde Municipality |
| Rauma videregående skole | Rauma Municipality |
| Romsdal videregående skole | Molde Municipality |
| Spjelkavik videregående skole | Ålesund Municipality |
| Stranda videregående skole | Stranda Municipality |
| Sunndal videregående skole | Sunndal Municipality |
| Surnadal videregående skole | Surnadal Municipality |
| Sykkylven videregående skole | Sykkylven Municipality |
| Tingvoll videregående skole | Tingvoll Municipality |
| Ulstein videregående skole | Ulstein Municipality |
| Vestborg vidaregående Skole | Stranda Municipality |
| Volda videregående skole | Volda Municipality |
| Ørskog videregående skole | Ålesund Municipality |
| Ørsta videregående skole | Ørsta Municipality |
| Ålesund maritime skole | Ålesund Municipality |
| Ålesund videregående skole | Ålesund Municipality |

=== Nordland ===
| School | Location |
|---|---|
| Academy of Commerce - Bodø | Bodø Municipality |
| Academy of Commerce - Sortland | Sortland Municipality |
| Andøy videregående skole | Andøy Municipality |
| Aust-Lofoten videregående skole | Vågan Municipality |
| Bodin videregående skole | Bodø Municipality |
| Bodø videregående skole | Bodø Municipality |
| Brønnøysund videregående skole | Brønnøy Municipality |
| Fauske videregående skole | Fauske Municipality |
| Hadsel tekniske fagskole | Hadsel Municipality |
| Knut Hamsun videregående skole | Hamarøy Municipality |
| Kristen videregående skole - Nordland | Nesna Municipality |
| Meløy videregående skole | Meløy Municipality; Gildeskål Municipality |
| Mosjøen videregående skole | Vefsn Municipality |
| Narvik videregående skole | Narvik Municipality |
| Nordland School of Fishing - Lofoten tekniske fagskole | Vestvågøy Municipality |
| Polarsirkelen videregående skole | Rana Municipality |
| Saltdal videregående skole | Saltdal Municipality |
| Sandnessjøen videregående skole | Alstahaug Municipality |
| Sortland videregående skole | Sortland Municipality |
| Vest-Lofoten videregående skole | Vestvågøy Municipality |
| Vefsn School of Agriculture | Vefsn Municipality |

=== Oslo ===
School
Academy of Commerce
Academy of Commerce - Oslo - Helsfyr
Bjerke videregående skole
Bjørknes Privatskole
Blindern videregående skole
Edvard Munch videregående skole
Eikelund videregående skole
Elvebakken videregående skole
Etterstad videregående skole
Forsøksgymnaset i Oslo
Foss videregående skole
Hartvig Nissens skole
Hellerud videregående skole
Hersleb videregående skole
Heltberg private gymnas
Holtet videregående skole
Kirkeveien videregående skole
Kongsskogen videregående skole
Kuben videregående skole
Kristelig Gymnasium
Lambertseter videregående skole
Nordre Aker videregående skole
Nydalen videregående skole
Oslo by Steinerskole
Oslo High School of Trade
Oslo katedralskole
Oslo sanitetsforenings Hjelpepleierskole
Oslo Voksenopplæring
Persbråten videregående skole
Rudolf Steinerskolen i Oslo
Sofienberg tekniske fagskole
Sonans Oslo
Stovner videregående skole
Treider College
Treider Private School
Ullern videregående skole
Ulsrud videregående skole
Vinterlandbruksskolen i Oslo
Vika videregående skole

=== Østfold ===
| School | Location |
|---|---|
| Academy of Commerce - Østfold | Fredrikstad Municipality |
| Askim videregående skole | Indre Østfold Municipality |
| Borg videregående skole | Sarpsborg Municipality |
| Frederik II videregående skole | Fredrikstad Municipality |
| Glemmen videregående skole | Fredrikstad Municipality |
| Greåker videregående skole | Sarpsborg Municipality |
| Halden videregående skole | Halden Municipality |
| Kalnes videregående skole | Sarpsborg Municipality |
| Kirkeparken videregående skole | Moss Municipality |
| Malakoff videregående skole | Moss Municipality |
| Mysen videregående skole | Indre Østfold Municipality |
| Plus-skolen | Fredrikstad Municipality |
| Rudolf Steinerskolen i Moss | Moss Municipality |
| Seiersborg videregående skole | Fredrikstad Municipality |
| St. Olav videregående skole | Sarpsborg Municipality |
| Tomb School of Agriculture | Råde Municipality |
| Østfold møbelsnekkerskole | Indre Østfold Municipality |
| Østfold tekniske fagskole | Sarpsborg Municipality |

=== Rogaland ===
| School | Location |
|---|---|
| Academy of Commerce - Haugesund | Haugesund Municipality |
| Academy of Commerce - Stavanger | Stavanger Municipality |
| Bergeland videregående skole | Stavanger Municipality |
| Bryne videregående skole | Time Municipality |
| Dalane videregående skole | Eigersund Municipality |
| Gand videregående skole | Sandnes Municipality |
| Godalen videregående skole | Stavanger Municipality |
| Haugaland videregående skole | Haugesund Municipality |
| Hetland videregående skole | Stavanger Municipality |
| Holgersens videregående skole | Haugesund Municipality |
| Jåttå videregående skole | Stavanger Municipality |
| Karmsund videregående skole | Haugesund Municipality |
| Kopervik videregående skole | Karmøy Municipality |
| Næringsmiddelteknisk skole, Norconserv | Stavanger Municipality |
| Randaberg videregående skole | Randaberg Municipality |
| Rogaland kranskole | Gjesdal Municipality |
| Rogaland videregående sjøaspirantskole | Stavanger Municipality |
| Sandnes videregående skole | Sandnes Municipality |
| Sauda videregående skole | Sauda Municipality |
| Skeisvang videregående skole | Haugesund Municipality |
| Sola videregående skole | Sola Municipality |
| Sonans Stavanger | Stavanger Municipality |
| St. Olav videregående skole | Stavanger Municipality |
| St. Svithun videregående skole | Stavanger Municipality |
| Stavanger katedralskole | Stavanger Municipality |
| Stavanger offshore tekniske skole | Stavanger Municipality |
| Steinerskolen i Haugesund | Haugesund Municipality |
| Steinerskolen i Stavanger | Stavanger Municipality |
| Strand videregående skole | Strand Municipality |
| Tryggheim videregående skole | Hå Municipality |
| Tveit videregående skole | Tysvær Municipality |
| Uldals videregående skole | Stavanger Municipality |
| Vardafjell videregående skole | Haugesund Municipality |
| Vinterlandbruksskulen i Ryfylke | Tysvær Municipality |
| Vinterlandbruksskulen på Jæren | Hå Municipality |
| Våland videregående skole | Stavanger Municipality |
| Øksnevad videregående skole | Klepp Municipality |
| Ølen videregående skole | Vindafjord Municipality |
| Lundeneset videregående skole | Vindafjord Municipality |
| Åkrehamn videregående skole | Karmøy Municipality |

=== Telemark ===
| School | Location |
|---|---|
| Bamble videregående skole | Bamble Municipality |
| Bø videregående skole | Midt-Telemark Municipality |
| Fyresdal videregående Steinerskole | Fyresdal Municipality |
| Hjalmar Johansen videregående skole | Skien Municipality |
| Kragerø videregående skole | Kragerø Municipality |
| Kvitsund Gymnas | Kviteseid Municipality |
| Nome videregående skole | Nome Municipality |
| Notodden videregående skole | Notodden Municipality |
| Academy of Commerce - Grenland | Skien Municipality |
| Porsgrunn videregående skole | Porsgrunn Municipality |
| Rjukan videregående skole | Tinn Municipality |
| NTG - Skien | Skien Municipality |
| Skien videregående skole | Skien Municipality |
| Skogmo videregående skole | Skien Municipality |
| Sonans Porsgrunn | Porsgrunn Municipality |
| Telemark tekniske fagskole | Porsgrunn Municipality |
| Treider College | Skien Municipality |
| Vest-Telemark videregående skole | Tokke Municipality |

=== Troms ===
| School | Location |
|---|---|
| Academy of Commerce - Harstad | Harstad Municipality |
| Academy of Commerce - Tromsø | Tromsø Municipality |
| Bardufoss videregående skole | Målselv Municipality |
| Breivang videregående skole | Tromsø Municipality |
| Harstad tekniske fagskole | Harstad Municipality |
| Heggen videregående skole | Harstad Municipality |
| Ishavsbyen videregående skole | Tromsø Municipality |
| Kongsbakken videregående skole | Tromsø Municipality |
| Kvaløya videregående skole | Tromsø Municipality |
| Nordkjosbotn videregående skole | Balsfjord Municipality |
| Nord-Troms videregående skole | Nordreisa Municipality |
| Norsk privatgymnas | Tromsø Municipality |
| Senja videregående skole | Senja Municipality |
| Sjøvegan videregående skole | Salangen Municipality |
| Stangnes Rå videregående skole | Harstad Municipality |
| Tromsdalen videregående skole | Tromsø Municipality |
| Tromsø kokk- og stuertskole | Tromsø Municipality |

=== Trøndelag ===
| School | Location |
|---|---|
| Academy of Commerce - Trondheim | Trondheim Municipality |
| Aglo videregående skole | Stjørdal Municipality |
| Bybroen videregående skole | Trondheim Municipality |
| Byåsen videregående skole | Trondheim Municipality |
| Charlottenland videregående skole | Trondheim Municipality |
| Cissi Klein videregående skole | Trondheim Municipality |
| Fosen videregående skole | Ørland Municipality |
| Gauldal videregående skole | Midtre Gauldal Municipality |
| Grong videregående skole | Grong Municipality |
| Guri Kunna videregående skole | Hitra Municipality; Frøya Municipality |
| Heimdal videregående skole | Trondheim Municipality |
| Inderøy videregående skole | Inderøy Municipality |
| Johan Bojer videregående skole | Indre Fosen Municipality |
| Kristen videregående skole - Trøndelag | Trondheim Municipality |
| Kyrksæterøra videregående skole | Heim Municipality |
| Levanger videregående skole | Levanger Municipality |
| Lukas Stiftelsens videregående skole | Malvik Municipality |
| Malvik videregående skole | Malvik Municipality |
| Meldal videregående skole | Orkland Municipality |
| Melhus videregående skole | Melhus Municipality |
| Meråker videregående skole | Meråker Municipality |
| Mære School of Agriculture | Steinkjer Municipality |
| Olav Duun videregående skole | Namsos Municipality; Overhalla Municipality |
| Ole Vig videregående skole | Stjørdal Municipality |
| Oppdal videregående skole | Oppdal Municipality |
| Orkdal videregående skole | Orkland Municipality |
| Røros videregående skole | Røros Municipality |
| Selbu videregående skole | Selbu Municipality |
| Skjetlein videregående skole | Trondheim Municipality |
| Sonans Private High School | Trondheim Municipality |
| Sonans Trondheim | Trondheim Municipality |
| Staup Gardener School | Levanger Municipality |
| Steinerskolen i Trondheim | Trondheim Municipality |
| Steinerskolen på Rotvoll | Trondheim Municipality |
| Steinkjer tekniske fagskole | Steinkjer Municipality |
| Steinkjer videregående skole | Steinkjer Municipality |
| Strinda videregående skole | Trondheim Municipality |
| Thora Storm videregående skole | Trondheim Municipality |
| Tiller videregående skole | Trondheim Municipality |
| Trondheim Katedralskole | Trondheim Municipality |
| Val videregående skole | Nærøysund Municipality |
| Verdal videregående skole | Verdal Municipality |
| Ytre Namdal videregående skole | Nærøysund Municipality |
| Åfjord videregående skole | Åfjord Municipality |

=== Vestfold ===
| School | Location |
|---|---|
| Academy of Commerce - Tønsberg | Tønsberg Municipality |
| Færder videregående skole | Tønsberg Municipality |
| Gjennestad Gardener School | Sandefjord Municipality |
| Greveskogen videregående skole | Tønsberg Municipality |
| Holmestrand videregående skole | Holmestrand Municipality |
| Horten videregående skole | Horten Municipality |
| Melsom videregående skole | Sandefjord Municipality |
| NettGymnaset | Tønsberg Municipality |
| Nøtterøy videregående skole | Færder Municipality |
| Re videregående skole | Tønsberg Municipality |
| Rudolf Steinerskolen i Vestfold | Færder Municipality |
| Sande videregående skole | Holmestrand Municipality |
| Sandefjord videregående skole | Sandefjord Municipality |
| Thor Heyerdahl videregående skole | Larvik Municipality |

=== Vestland ===
| School | Location |
|---|---|
| Academy of Commerce - Bergen | Bergen Municipality |
| Amalie Skram videregående skole | Bergen Municipality |
| Arna videregående skole | Bergen Municipality |
| Askøy videregående skole | Askøy Municipality |
| Austevoll videregående skole | Austevoll Municipality |
| Austrheim videregående skole | Austrheim Municipality |
| Bergen High School of Commerce | Bergen Municipality |
| Bergen katedralskole | Bergen Municipality |
| Bømlo videregående skole | Bømlo Municipality |
| Dale vidaregåande skule | Fjaler Municipality |
| Danielsen Intensivgymnas | Bergen Municipality |
| Danielsen videregående skole | Bergen Municipality |
| Eid vidaregåande skule | Stad Municipality |
| Firda vidaregåande skule | Gloppen Municipality |
| Fitjar videregående skole | Fitjar Municipality |
| Flora vidaregåande skule | Kinn Municipality |
| Framnes kristne videregående skole | Kvam Municipality |
| Fusa videregående skole | Bjørnafjorden Municipality |
| Fyllingsdalen videregående skole | Bergen Municipality |
| Førde videregående skole | Sunnfjord Municipality |
| Hjeltnes Gardener School | Ulvik Municipality |
| Hop videregående skole | Askøy Municipality |
| Høyanger vidaregåande skule | Høyanger Municipality |
| Intensivgymnaset | Bergen Municipality |
| Knarvik videregående skole | Alver Municipality |
| Kongshaug Upper Secondary School of Music | Bjørnafjorden Municipality |
| Kvam videregående skole | Kvam Municipality |
| Kvinnherad videregående skole | Kvinnherad Municipality |
| Kyrre skole | Bergen Municipality |
| Laksevåg og Bergen maritime videregående skole | Bergen Municipality |
| Langhaugen videregående skole | Bergen Municipality |
| Måløy vidaregåande skule | Kinn Municipality |
| Nettgymnas.no | Voss Municipality |
| Nordahl Grieg videregående skole | Bergen Municipality |
| Odda videregående skole | Ullensvang Municipality |
| Olsvikåsen videregående skole | Bergen Municipality |
| Os Gymnas | Bjørnafjorden Municipality |
| Os videregående skole | Bjørnafjorden Municipality |
| Osterøy videregående skole | Osterøy Municipality |
| Rubbestadnes yrkesskole | Bømlo Municipality |
| Rudolf Steinerskolen i Bergen | Bergen Municipality |
| Sandsli videregående skole | Bergen Municipality |
| Slåtthaug videregående skole | Bergen Municipality |
| Sogn jord- og hagebruksskule | Aurland Municipality |
| Sogndal vidaregåande skule | Sogndal Municipality |
| Sonans Videregående | Bergen Municipality |
| Sotra videregående skole | Øygarden Municipality |
| Steinerskolen i Bergen | Bergen Municipality |
| Stend School of Agriculture | Bergen Municipality |
| Stord videregående skole | Stord Municipality |
| Stryn vidaregåande skule | Stryn Municipality |
| Tertnes videregående skole | Bergen Municipality |
| Voss Gymnas | Voss Municipality |
| Voss School of Agriculture | Voss Municipality |
| Voss School of Domestic Work | Voss Municipality |
| Årdal vidaregåande skule | Årdal Municipality |
| Årstad videregående skole | Bergen Municipality |
| Åsane videregående skole | Bergen |

== Colleges ==
- University of Agder
- Bergen Academy of Art and Design
- Western Norway University of Applied Sciences
- Oslo New University College
- University of Nordland
- University of South-Eastern Norway
- Griegakademiet
- Inland Norway University of Applied Sciences
- Molde University College
- Norwegian School of Economics
- Nord University
- Norwegian Air Force Academy
- Norwegian Academy of Music
- MF Norwegian School of Theology, Religion and Society
- Norwegian Military Academy
- Royal Norwegian Naval Academy
- Norwegian Police University College
- Norwegian School of Information Technology
- BI Norwegian Business School
- Oslo National Academy of the Arts
- Oslo School of Architecture and Design
- Oslo Metropolitan University
- Sámi University of Applied Sciences
- Volda University College
- Østfold University College

== Universities ==
- Norwegian University of Life Sciences (UMB) (Ås Municipality) (estb. 2005)
- Norwegian University of Science and Technology (NTNU) (Trondheim Municipality) (estb. 1996)
- University of Bergen (UiB) (Bergen Municipality) (estb. 1948)
- University of Oslo (UiO) (Oslo Municipality) (the country's first university) (estb. 1811)
- University of Stavanger (UiS) (Stavanger Municipality) (estb. 2005)

== Other Schools ==
- Grimstad Bible School
- Red Cross Nordic United World College, a United World College, established in 1995
- Skagerak International School, established in 1991
- Sagavoll Folkehøgskole
- Stiftelsen Norges Toppidrettsgymnas, The Norwegian College of Elite Sport
