= List of schools in Sandefjord =

Schools in Sandefjord Municipality, Norway include:

== Higher education ==
- Norwegian school of management (BI Vestfold)

== Secondary/high schools ==
All external links are in Norwegian.

- Sandefjord videregående skole
- Skagerak International School
- Skiringssal folkehøyskole

== Middle schools ==
All external links are in Norwegian.

- Skagerak Middle School,
- Breidablikk
- Ranvik
- Varden
- Bugården

== Primary schools ==
All external links are in Norwegian.

- Skagerak Primary School, IB World School delivering Primary Years Programme (PYP)
- Haukerød, north of the city
- Krokemoa, approximately 4 km west of the city
- Byskolen, the oldest school in Sandefjord
- Unneberg, the smallest in the municipality
- Gokstad, by the north end of Østerøya
- Virik
- Sande, close to the city
- Framnes, shut down
- Fevang
- Helgerød
- Mosserød
- Store Bergan
- Ormestad, shut down

== See also ==
- List of schools in Norway
