= Skagerrak (disambiguation) =

Skagerrak is a strait between Denmark, Norway and Sweden.

Skagerrak or Skagerak may also refer to:

- Skagerrak (film), a 2003 Danish drama
- Skagerrak (power transmission system)
- Skagerak Energi, a Norwegian utility company
- Skagerak International School, in Norway
