= Bjørkelangen =

- Village
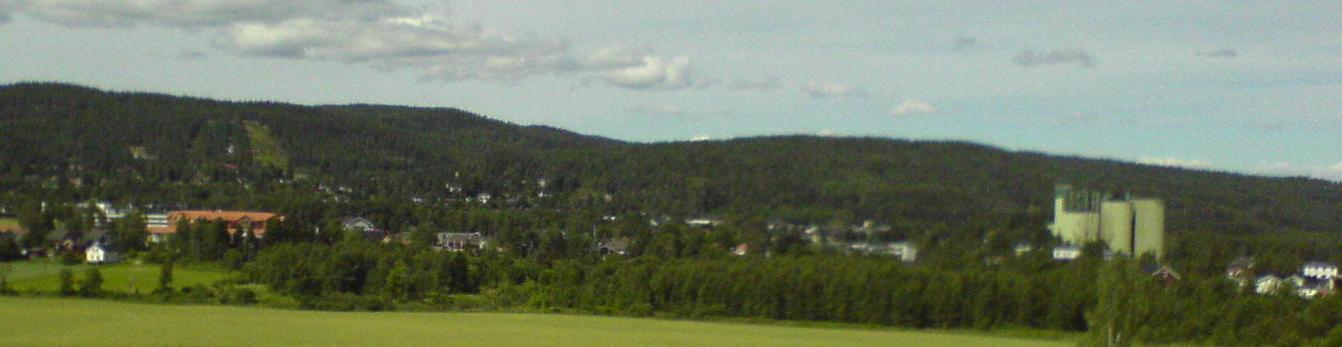
- Bjørkelangen seen from Eidslia

- Location in Akershus
- Coordinates: 59°53′04″N 11°34′10″E
- Country: Norway
- County: Akershus
- District: Romerike
- Municipality: Aurskog-Høland

Area
  - Total: 2.76 km^{2} (1.07 sq mi)

Population (2015)
  - Total: 3,196
- Time zone: UTC+1 (CET)
  - Summer (DST): UTC+2 (CEST)
- Postal code: 1940

Bjørkelangen is a village of 3,196 inhabitants (January 2015 figures) in the Akershus county of south-eastern Norway. Located immediately north of Lake Bjørkelangen, it became the administrative centre of the Aurskog-Høland municipality in 1966.

The village is home to a primary school, a junior high school, and two senior high schools: Bjørkelangen Videregående Skole, which is a traditional high school offering a broad academic curriculum, and Kjelle Videregående Skole, which focuses on agricultural and forestry education.

Commercial facilities in Bjørkelangen include three grocery stores, two petrol stations, as well as a number of clothing stores and other retail outlets near the main, pedestrianized street.

== Gallery ==
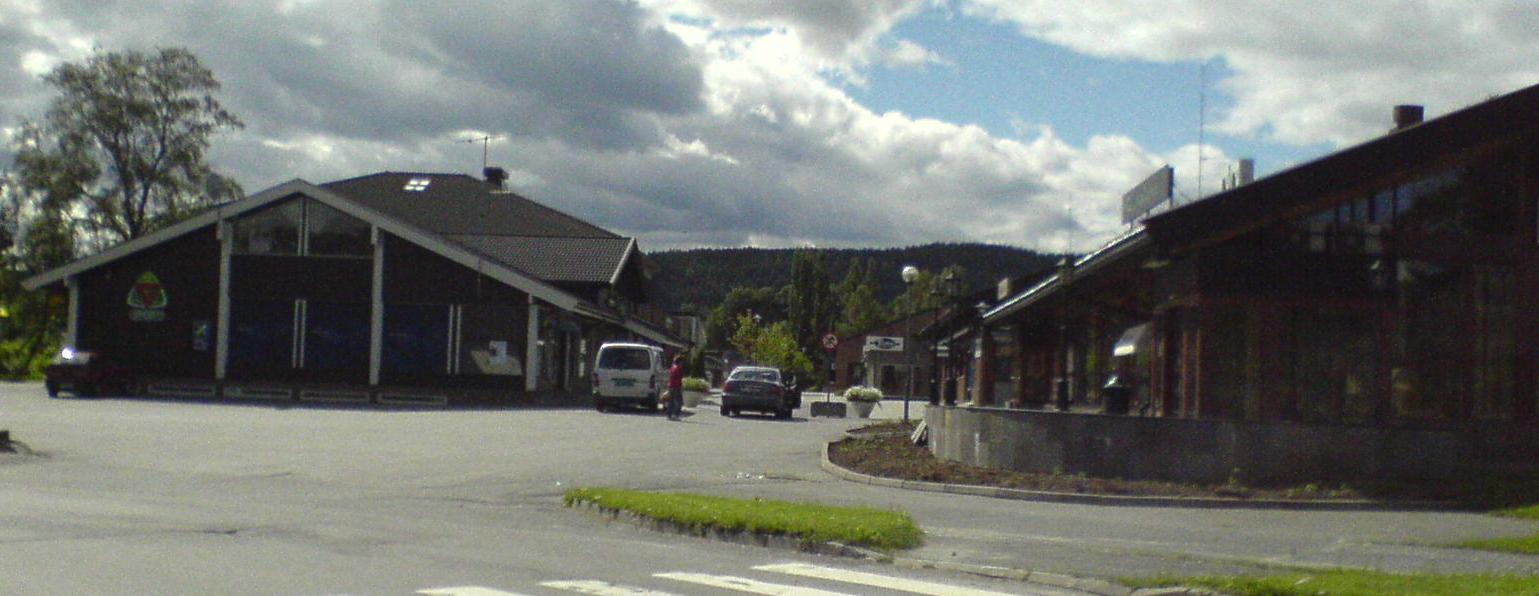
Main shopping street

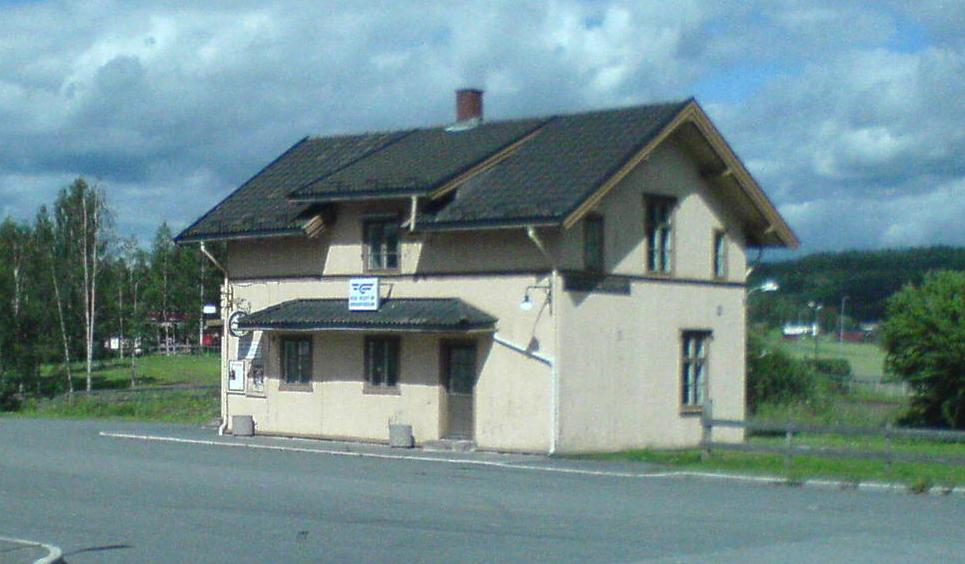
Former railway station

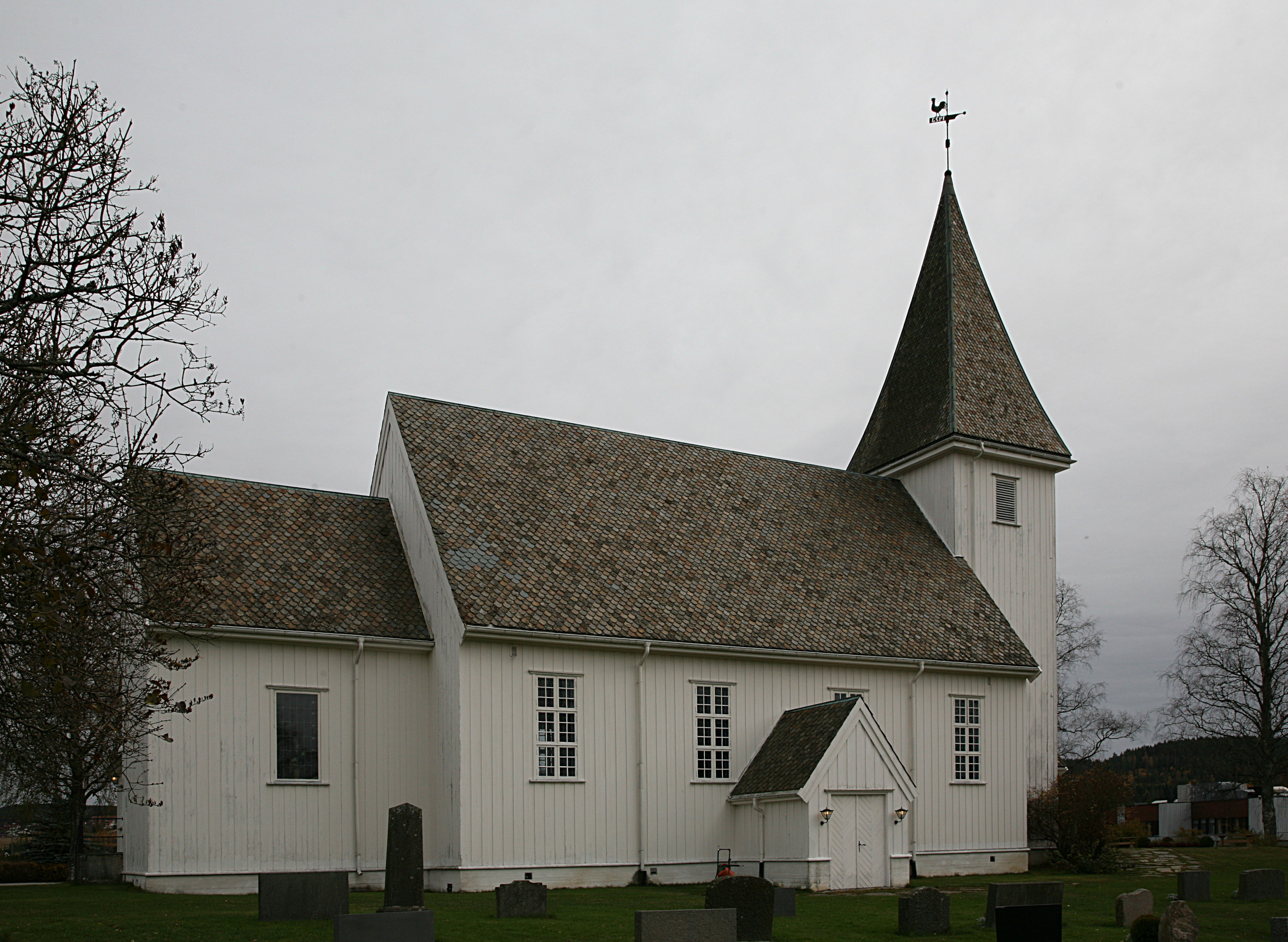
Bjørkelangen church
