= Dina (musician) =

- Born: Caroline Lillian Kongerud; 1 August 1985 (age 41); Holtet, Oslo, Norway
- Origin: Norway
- Genres: Pop; trance
- Occupation: Singer
- Years active: 2003–present
- Labels: Tribe Records; Universal Music; Catchy Tunes
- Website: dinaweb.no

Caroline "Dina" Lillian Kongerud (commonly referred to by the stage name Dina), born 1 August 1985, is a Norwegian pop/trance artist. She released one album and seven singles in the early 2000s, several of which were hits. Her first single topped the Norwegian record chart and was later re-released in Swedish and English.

== Early life ==
Kongerud grew up in Holtet, Oslo, the daughter of a university professor. She attended Lambertseter Upper Secondary School in Oslo, including one year as an exchange student in the United States. She also studied classical singing at the Barratt Due Institute of Music in Oslo.

At age seven, she began playing classical music, switching to pop music at age 14. From age 11, she took classes in opera singing. When she was a child, she was nicknamed "Dina", which she adopted as her stage name when entering the music industry.

== Career ==
Dina started writing songs in 2000, initially writing in English, before switching to Norwegian. She began her music career by engaging the Norwegian singer-songwriter Jahn Teigen's talent company Teigen Studio. Later she signed with the Norwegian record label Tribe Records. She was the first trance music artist in Norway to sing in Norwegian, and also the first female Norwegian trance artist.

Dina released four successful singles in 2003, including "Bli hos meg" ("Stay with me"), and "For evig min" ("Forever mine"). "Bli hos meg" was the first ever trance song in Norwegian, and topped the Norwegian charts for three weeks. Despite being given the worst possible score, a "die throw" of 1, in a review by the newspaper Dagbladet, the song was a major hit. The single sold to double platinum and stayed on the VG-lista Top 20 record chart for 21 weeks, the longest of any song in 2003. Her second single, "For evig min", stayed on VG-lista for 10 weeks and peaked at 4th place. Her first and only album Dina was released in November 2003, spending five weeks on VG-lista. The album reached a peak position of 18th on the record chart. The 11-track album was released by Universal Music, and was given a positive review and a "die throw" of 4 by the newspaper Dagsavisen.

She released another single in 2004, called "Besatt" ("Obsessed"). In 2005 she released the single "Hvis" ("If"), which reached 5th place on the VG-lista Top 20 record chart and stayed on the chart for 13 weeks. Her seventh single, "En sommernatts drøm" ("A summernight's dream"), was also released in 2005 and reached 17th place on VG-lista, staying on the chart for four weeks. In addition, she collaborated with her then-boyfriend Diaz on the 2005 rap single "Ikke alene" ("Not alone"), released by the label Nordic Records. "Ikke alene" was included in Diaz' 2006 album Jessheimfanden. In 2007 Dina re-released her debut single "Bli hos meg" in Swedish and English in collaboration with the musician Deejay Jay. "Bli hos meg" was relaunched by the Swedish record label Catchy Tunes on 20 June 2007 under the titles "Bli Hos Mig" and "Say Goodbye".

Dina was a finalist in Miss Norway 2003 only months before she became an artist. In 2006 she participated in the first season of Skal vi danse?, the Norwegian version of Strictly Come Dancing. In 2004 she played herself in an episode of the comedy television programme Team Antonsen.

Kongerud studied law at the University of Oslo, graduating in 2010. As of 2016, she was working as a lawyer at the Ministry of Local Government and Regional Development while occasionally performing as a musical artist.

In November 2016, Dina released a new version of the 2003 song "Bli hos meg" through Universal Music.

== Discography ==
=== Albums ===
- Dina (November 2003)

=== Singles ===
Solo

- "Bli hos meg" (2003)
- "For evig min" (2003)
- "Besatt" (2004)
- "Hvis" (2005)
- "En sommernatts drøm" (2005)
- "Bli hos meg" (new version) (2016)

Collaborations

- "Ikke alene" (2005, with Diaz)
- "Bli Hos Mig" (2007, with Deejay Jay)
- "Say Goodbye" (2007, with Deejay Jay)

== Chart positions ==
=== Albums ===
- 2003 — Dina # 18 - VG-lista

=== Singles ===
- 2003 — "Bli hos meg" # 1 - VG-lista
- 2003 — "For evig min" # 4 - VG-lista
- 2005 — "Hvis" # 5 - VG-lista
- 2005 — "En sommernatts drøm" # 17 - VG-lista
