= Hjertnes Civic and Theater Center =

Building complex in Sandefjord, Norway

Coordinates: 59°07′44″N 10°13′11″E

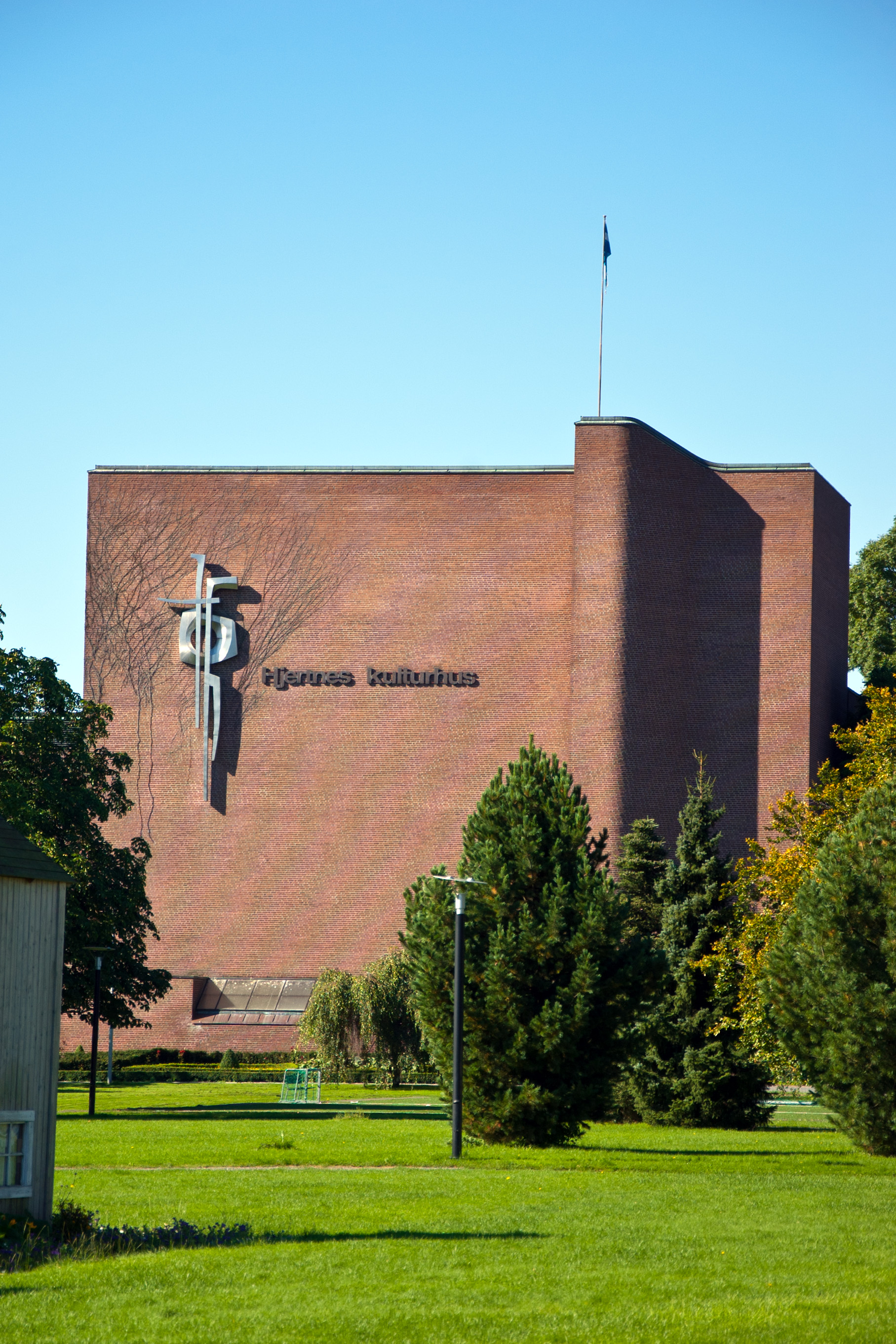
Hjertnes seen from Badeparken.

Hjertnes Civic and Theater Center is a series of municipal buildings in the city of Sandefjord in Sandefjord Municipality, Norway, which houses the City Hall, city library and a movie theater. It is situated next-door to Scandic Park Hotel at Sandefjordsveien in the city center. It has three auditoriums and an outdoor amphitheater. Hjertnes also presents concerts, live theater, operas and other cultural events.

The city hall was dedicated by shipping magnate Anders Jahre (1891–1982) on June 21, 1975. A bronze statue of Anders Jahre by sculptor Joseph Grimeland (1916–2002) sits by the City Hall's main entrance. The sculpture was unveiled on June 21, 1975. A large stainless steel sculpture, the sea queen (Havdronningen), was made by Arnold Haukeland and is located outside the building. The sculpture was unveiled on April 7, 1976, and it is nearly ten meters tall. It was a gift to the city from Lars Christensen Jr., AS Thor Dahl, and Framnæs Mekaniske Værksted.

Hjertnes Civic and Theater Center was designed by architects Trond Eliassen and Birger Lambertz-Nilsen.

== History ==
When the Hjertnes Civic and Theater Center was completed in 1975, Aftenposten described its Hjertnes Hall as the best concert venue in Norway.

The city hall was completed in 1975 and is built of red-brown brick. Anders Jahre raised a total of NOK 40 million towards the construction. As of 2000, it consists of a public library, administration offices, city hall, movie theater, and halls for concerts and theatrical performances.
