= Badeparken =

Public park in Sandefjord, Norway

Coordinates: 59°07′43″N 10°13′24″E

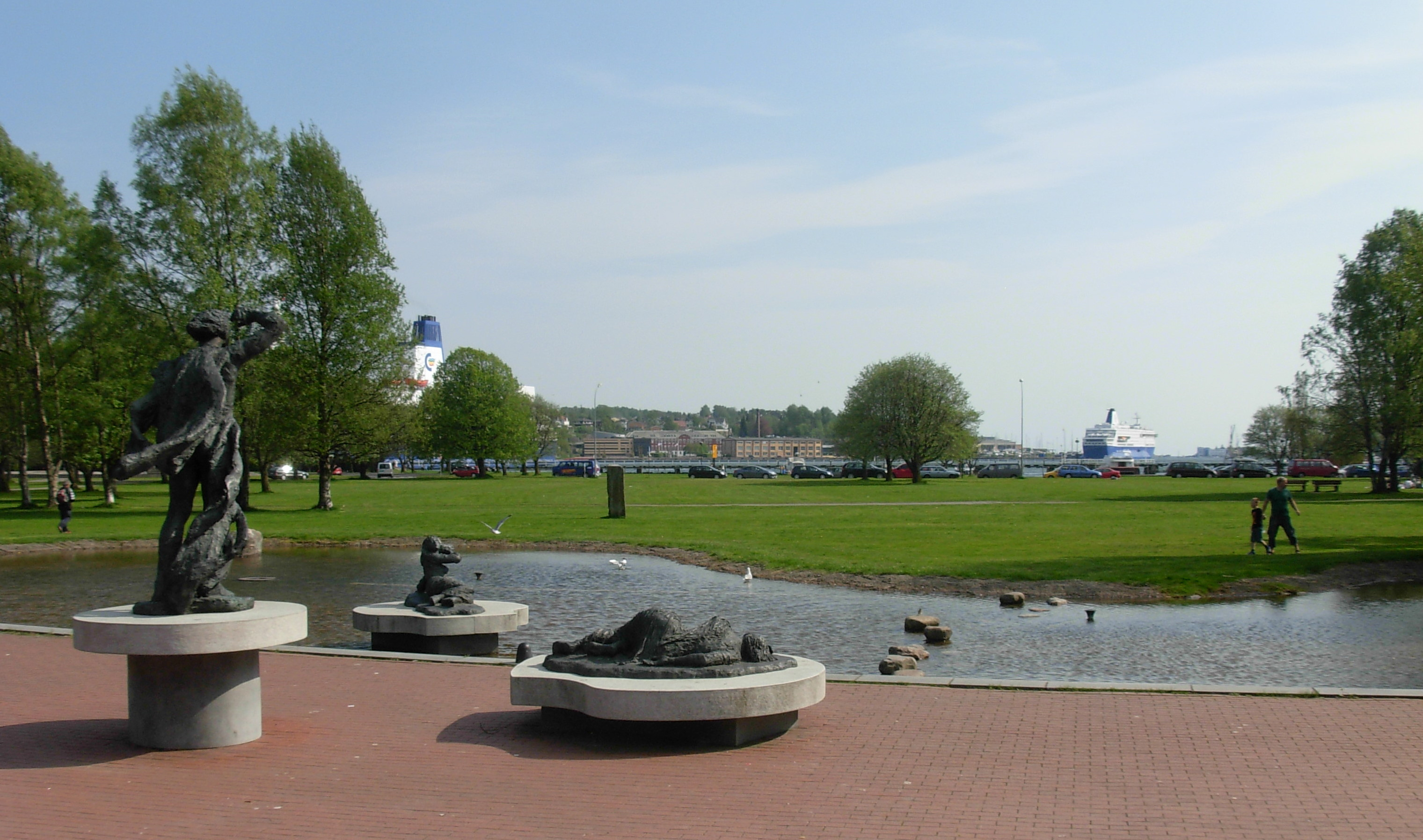
The sculpture Poseidon by Nina Sundbye is located by a 400 m^{2} reflection pool.

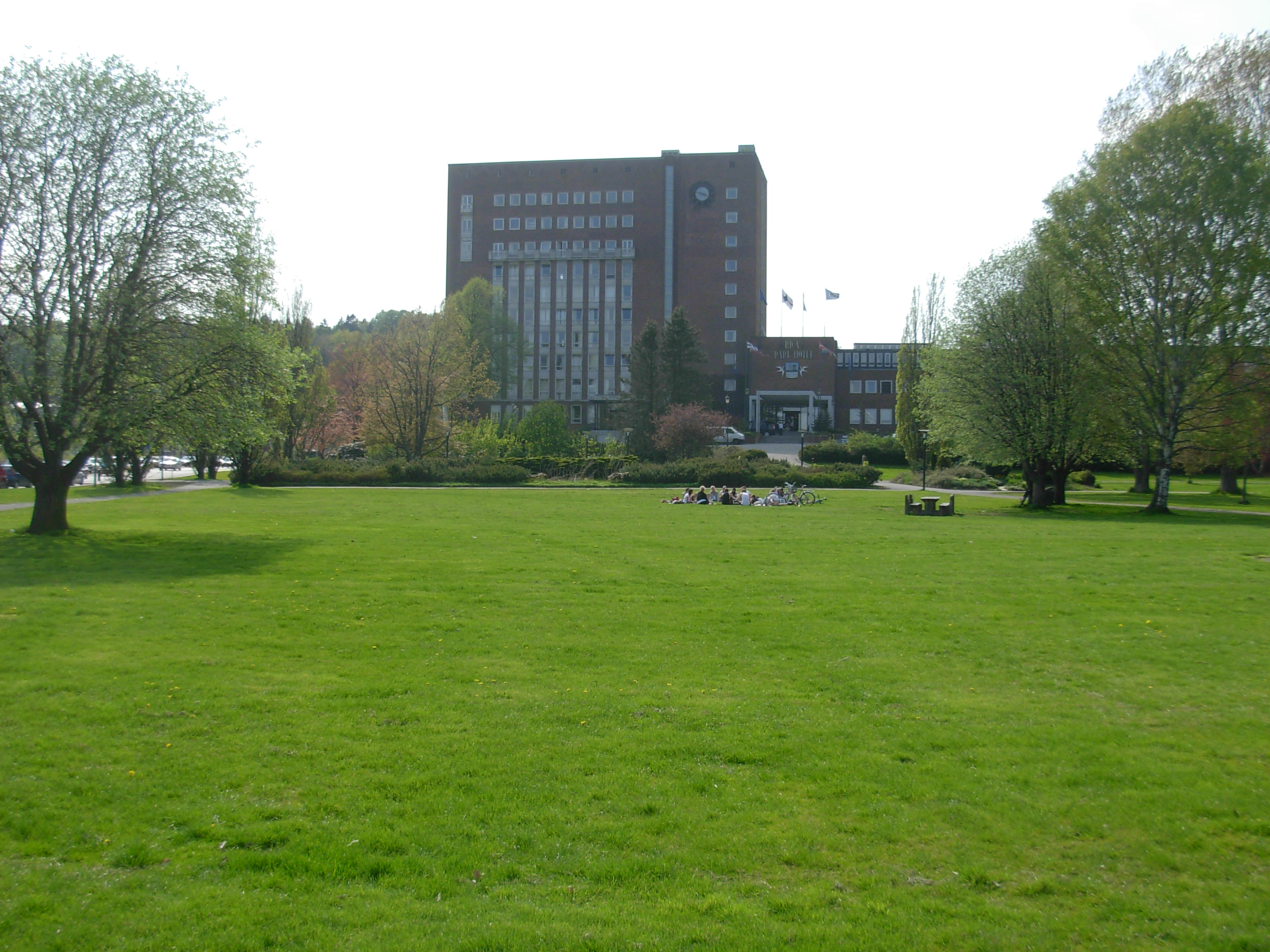
Park Hotel as seen from Badeparken

Badeparken ("the Bathing Park") is a 12-acre (4.8 ha) public park in the centre of the city of Sandefjord in Sandefjord Municipality, Norway. It is near the harbor and is home to a playground, sculpture park, several reflection mirrors, and an amphitheater. The park was established for guests at Sandefjord Spa in 1902. The park’s site was previously a field, Badejordene, which belonged to Hjernesgården (Hjertnes Farm). Sandefjord Spa established the park here in the early 1900s. The city had plans to develop housing in the park in 1936, however, the plans were revoked and it remained a park. The park received its current look between World War II and 1953 after parts of Sandefjord Spa were demolished and walking paths, trees, and a music pavilion were installed in the park.

In the southeast, Badeparken borders the streets Strandpromenaden and Jernbanealleen that meet by Whaler's Monument. It borders Sandefjordsveien in the west and Hjertnespromenaden in the north. Sandefjord Spa is located near the park. Badeparken is adjacent to Scandic Park Hotel and Hjertnes Civic and Theater Center.

Tree species in the park include Rowan, European ash, Goat willow, Alder, and Maple.

An ice-skating rink ("Thor Dahlsgate isflate") has been installed near the park. The Grans Octoberfest and the music festival Fjordfesten take place here, as well as a seasonal amusement park (tivoli).
