= Asker Upper Secondary School =

Coordinates: 59°49′53.7″N 10°26′14.88″E

- Asker videregående skole
- Asker, Akershus; Norway

Information
- Headmaster: Cathrine Kittilsen Zandjani
- Faculty: 100
- Age range: 16-19
- Enrollment: 680 (2018)

Asker Upper Secondary School (Norwegian: Asker videregående skole) is an upper secondary school in Asker, Norway. Founded in 1955, it has 680 students aged 16–19, as of 2018. The school only offers a general academics program, after the sports program got moved to Bleiker Upper Secondary School (Norwegian: Bleiker videregående skole)

== Alumni ==
Notable former (and current) students include Morten Harket (A-ha), and Helge Lund (CEO of StatoilHydro).
