= Tribe Records (Norway) =

Norwegian record label

Tribe Records was a Norwegian record label founded in 1998. The company became one of the biggest contributors to the Norwegian record chart VG-Lista Topp 20 the following years. Tribe fast became a commercial label focusing on dance, trance and pop.

Tribe Records was among the first record-companies in Norway to fully start with the 360-deals when building their artist. The label had management, booking, and the standard label functions.

== History ==
Originally, four partners founded the company: Christopher Collings, Andreas Papandreu Høyer, Anders Dybvik and Martin O. Muren. In 2001 John Sørensen joined the group.

In 2002 Tribe Records became the biggest domestic hit-label in Norway with a total of 28.9% of the Norwegian hit share on VG-Lista. Many artists such as Dina, Spritneybears, 2PM, L8R and Spin-Up were signed with the label.

In its last three years, Tribe Records collaborated with the Danish company Capella Music, owned by the founder of Mega Records Edel-Mega Records Kjeld Wennick. At the end of 2003, the label was closed down.

== Participants ==
- Christopher Collings: A&R and creative leader. Later he founded We Love The 90's.
- Andreas Høyer: to some extent A&R, presented as head of promotion.
- Anders Dybvik: head of projects, sales and booking
- John Sørensen
- Martin O. Muren

== Marketing controversies ==
Representatives of Tribe Records have stated in numerous interviews that their slogan is "we make ur shit hit".

The label's aggressive marketing methods soon came under fire when they organised marketing activities in kindergartens to promote the new group "Splash". Following weeks of pressure from various newspapers, most notably Avis1, the leader of the Norwegian Teacher's Association (Norsk Lærerlag) Laila-Brith Josefsen, and Ombudsman for Children Trond Waage, the label cancelled the plans. The dispute peaked when the Tribe Records bought the entire front page of Avis1, advertising Splash as "This year's album" signed with "Tribe Kindergarten".

The strategy on having total control of each band and artist signed to the label was not very popular among the music journalists. When Håkon Moslet wrote his reviews on one of the acts; "Spin-Up", his write-up was more of an essay that criticised the label and its methods, rather than an actual review of the act.

When Spritneybears, one of Norway's highest-selling artists for three years, finally released its album in 2003, rumours arose that the artists had never sung any vocals on the albums themselves. It was rumoured that most vocals were instead performed by Kjetil Tefke, who was never officially attached to the band or credited.

In 2003, when Jostein Hasselgård, the Norwegian winner of Eurovision Song Contest, was readying his single for release, Tribe Records quickly recorded and released a cover version of the track in the same week. The Tribe version of Hasselgård's song outperformed Hasselgård's own version, peaking four places higher on the sales chart than Hasselgård did.

Norway's third-largest newspaper, Dagbladet, at last nominated Tribe as "The Last Cowboys" of the music scene. However, the persons involved went separate ways only months later.

== Artists ==
=== Caroline Dina Kongerud ===
Known as Norway's first dance artist singing in Norwegian.

- Album:
  - "Dina"
- Single:
  - 2003: "Bli Hos Meg"
  - 2003: "For Evig Min"
  - 2004: "Fri Meg Nå"

=== Spritneybears ===
- Album:
  - 2003: "A Night At Spritney Mansion", TR-10034
- Single:
  - 2002: "The Bumpisong"
  - 2002: "Fraglene"
  - 2003: "Ghostbusters"
  - 2003: "Woodpeckers From Space"

=== L8R ===
Norway's first real boyband. The album was mainly produced by Clawfinger, and the young boys referring to their music as metal pop

- Album:
  - "Enter The Dragon", TR-10039
- Single:
  - "Back In Black"
  - "In Da House"
  - "World Of Pain"

=== 2PM ===
To ensure the breakthrough of this artist, Tribe started to brand its first single as "This Year's Official Russ-single" (Årets Offisielle Russelåt).

- Album:
  - "2PM"
- Single:
  - "Sonata", TRS-10009
  - "Mountain King", TRS-10012
  - "C'Mon", TRS-10013
  - "Open Your Eyes", TRS-10020
  - "Tetris"

=== Splash ===
A duo consisting of Anett Nylander and Janni Santillan

- Single
  - "Everybody" TRS-10022
- Album
  - "Splash"
  - "God Jul & Godt Nyttår"

=== Spin-Up ===
- Album:
  - 2001: "Heart Arrow Star"
- Single:
  - 2001: "If You Wanna Party"
  - 2001: "Sing Na Na Na"
  - 2002: "Edge Of Braking", TRS-10015

=== TwoGees ===
- Single:
  - "My Man Is Out", TRS-10011

=== Silent Forces & Shahzad ===
- Single:
  - "Rap Møter Banghra", TRS-10017
  - "Fasana (Tid For Tabla)", TRS-10024

=== The Shining ===
- Single:
  - "Maze", TRS-10011

=== Howard & Christine ===
A duo consisting of Håvard Sylte and Christine Hauge.

- Single
  - 2002: "Støveldance"
  - 2003: "Ooa Hela Natten"
  - 2003: "I'm Not Afraid To Move On"

=== Chixie Dicks ===
- Album
  - "Sluts Of The Industry"
- Single
  - "It's Your Duty"

== Compilations ==
=== Mpetre Hits ===
Joint venture with the Norwegian public service NRK's channel Mpetre.

- "Mpetre Hits Volum 2"
- "Mpetre Hits Volum 3"

=== Deejay Charts ===
- "Deejay Charts Volum 1"
- "Deejay Charts Volum 2"

=== Russehits 2003 ===
- "Russehits 2003"

=== +47 Hip Hop ===
Joint venture with the Norwegian hip hop gazette, Kingsize.

- "+47 Hip Hop – En Introduksjon"
