= Tangen Upper Secondary School =

Tangen High School
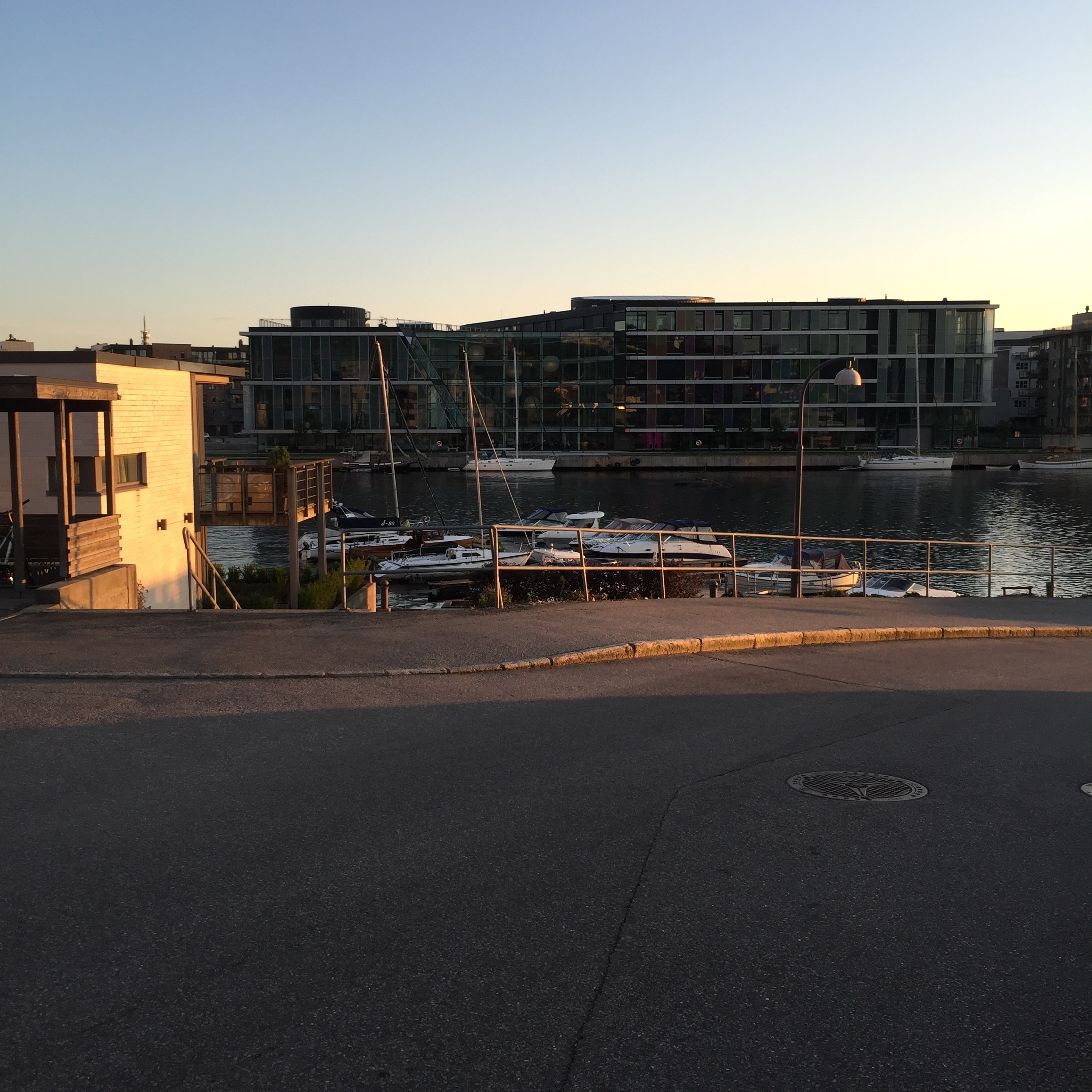

Location
- Tangen 21; Kvadraturen, Kristiansand, Agder 4608; Norway
- Coordinates: 58.1479°N 8.0083°E

Information
- Type: Public high school
- Established: 2009
- Principal: Stein Kristian Dillevig
- Enrollment: 1000
- Color: Blue
- Website: Official website

Tangen Upper Secondary School (Norwegian: Tangen videregående skole) is a public school in Kristiansand, Norway. It has around 1200 students and 250 employees.

== See also ==
- Kvadraturen skolesenter
- Education in Norway
