= Ski Upper Secondary School =

Ski Videregående skole

Location
- Ski, Norway, Akershus; Norway
- Coordinates: 59°43′03″N 10°50′57″E

Information
- Head teacher: Hege Britt Johnsen
- Website: https://ski.vgs.no/

Ski videregående skole is a school (high school, upper secondary school) in Ski, Norway. The school was founded in its present form in 1938, while the current building dates from 1968. It is situated in the city of Ski.

Pupils who want to start at the school, regularly need quite high grades, as it is a rather attractive place to study, given its lines of study, several good teachers and its central location, close to the city centre.

As of 2008, the school offers three main ways to study: music, dance and drama, physical education and regular education. None of the options are meant to give pupils an education that enables them to get right into work after finished graduation. Instead, the students are supposed to study at universities and similar facilities after Ski videregående skole.
