= Valdres Upper Secondary School =

School in Innlandet, Norway

Coordinates: 60.9688°N 9.3069°E

Valdres Upper Secondary School (Valdres videregåande skule) is a high school in Leira, just south of the town of Fagernes in Nord-Aurdal Municipality in Innlandet county, Norway. It is the main high school for the vast majority of students in the greater Valdres area, and offers a relatively broad range of subjects. The school is run by the Innlandet County Municipality.

Since distances in the area are quite large, many students live in small apartments closer to the school (e.g. students from the areas furthest away may take up to an hour of travel every day by bus just to reach the school).

Prior to 2001, the school was split into two campuses, one in Leira and another at Fagernes, but a new building and heavy investment from the municipality enlarged the Leira campus so that everyone could be at one school.

The principal is Kari Elisabeth Rustad, and the student count is generally around 500.
