= Skagerak International School =

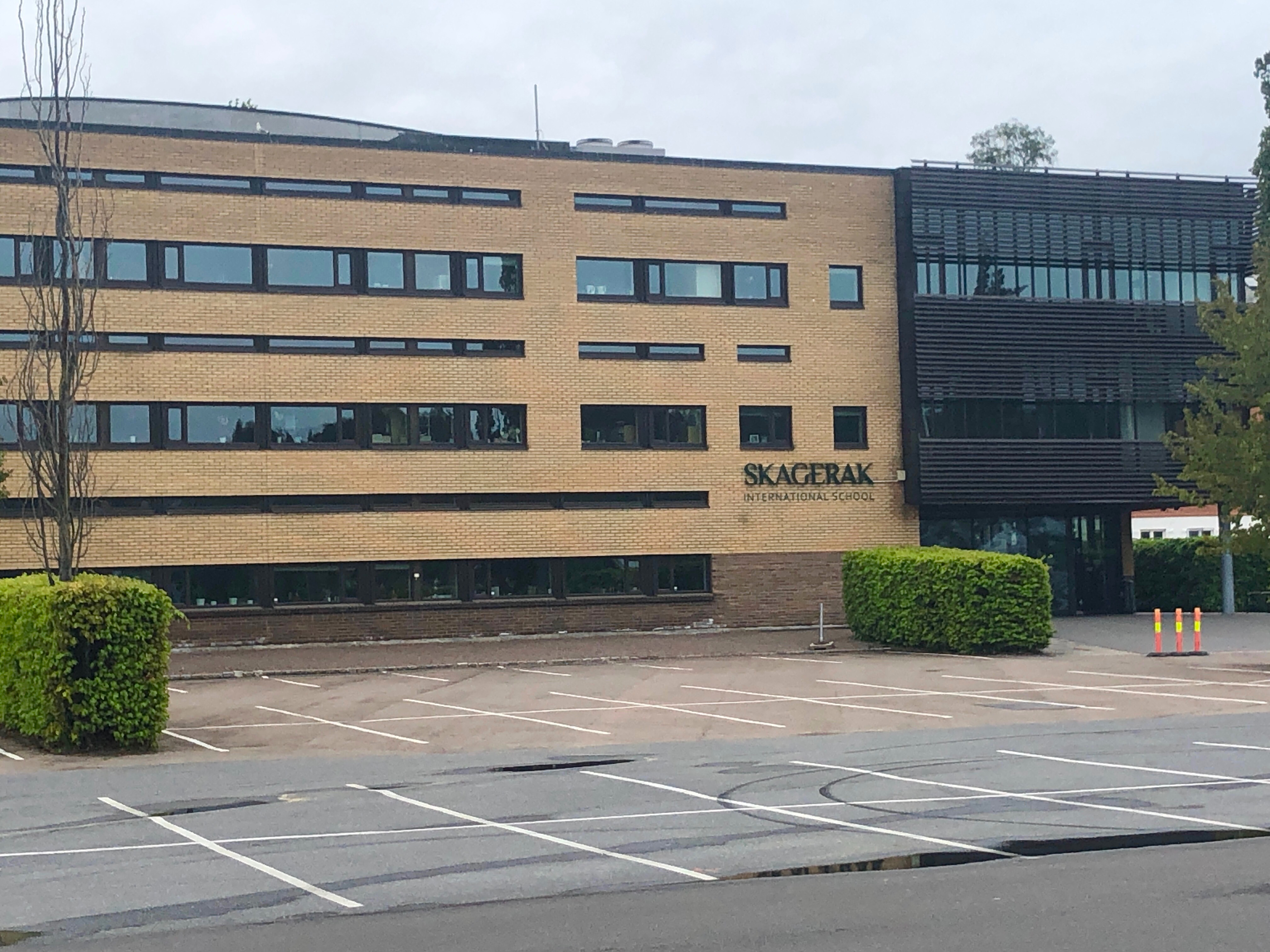

Location
- Framnesveien 7 Framnes; Sandefjord, Vestfold; Norway; 59°07′14.5″N 10°13′50.9″E

Information
- Type: Private
- Motto: "An open-minded community that fosters lifelong learning in a global context."
- Established: 1991
- Founder: Elisabeth Norr
- Director: James Tester
- Head of school: Niklas Winander (high school)
- Faculty: approx. 40
- Gender: 49.3% male, 50.7% female
- Age range: 4–19
- Student to teacher ratio: 1:8
- Hours in school day: 8
- Campus type: Suburban
- School fees: 25,000-40,000 NOK

The international schools at Skagerak are a group of private schools located on the waterfront in the city of Sandefjord in Sandefjord Municipality, Norway. Skagerak is located at the prestigious premises of the former shipyard administration at Framnes. They comprise a kindergarten, primary school, middle school, and a high school. The high school is recognized as an International Baccalaureate World School. Together, they promote mutual respect, intercultural awareness and international-mindedness through the International Baccalaureate programmes: the Diploma, Middle Years and Primary Years programmes. The PYP was authorized in June 2006 and the Middle School is a candidate for MYP authorization in June 2007.

The Skagerak schools were founded to provide a high level of education and quality teaching concerning each student. The schools’ population is made up of a mix of Norwegian students, those who have lived overseas, and students with a variety of other nationalities. Although English is the language of instruction, students are, or become, bilingual and several additional languages are offered in the middle and high schools. The teachers are as diverse as the students, providing a wide range of international influence and knowledge. Although relatively small, Skagerak offers students a varied curriculum with opportunities such as outdoor education, cultural trips, service, performing arts, and sport.

Annual ski trips take place from PY6 and up, and Primary, and Middle School students participate in organized outdoor education programs of excursions and camps, along with two or more annual international trips. High School students often participate in service-oriented trips to Central Asia, Africa, and Europe. As of 2009, the school had 359 enrolled students from 20 countries. It was 34 full-time faculty members and 6 part-time, originating from 13 countries. The faculty is highly experienced, and most have backgrounds in international education. Students benefit from English medium education with an additional emphasis on other languages to support bilingualism. The school is operated by its own independent Board of Governors.

Representatives for the world's leading universities are visiting the high school yearly, and Skagerak offers university guidance for graduates. High School classes also attend international universities which have previously included University of British Columbia in Canada, Glyndŵr University in Wales, London School of Economics, and others. Despite being a private school, it is recognized by the Norwegian State Educational Loan Fund, which funds 85 percent of the tuition fees. Sports offered at Skagerak are soccer, tennis, volleyball, basketball, gymnastics, athletics, and indoor games. The campus facilities encompass two playing fields, two basketball courts, a tennis court, and a turf playing area. It has a cafeteria, an art room, and three science laboratories.

The annual graduation for High School students takes place during a ceremony held at the Banquet Hall at Scandic Park Hotel. Diplomas and awards are awarded at the ceremony.

As of 2011, there were 173 students enrolled at its high school, 102 at its middle school, and 95 at its elementary school. For high school students, 85 percent of the cost is covered by the state, and students paid an annual fee out-of-pocket of 20,790 NOK.

== History ==
The Kindergarten (est. 2005) and the Primary School (est. 2000) were located in Kjellbergveien until 2011, and the Middle (est. 2000) and High Schools (est. 1991) in Framnesveien, housed in the old prestigious facilities of Framnæs shipyard mechanical workshop and facilities. In 2011, the Kindergarten and Primary School were moved to Framnesveien, and the schools are now united, occupying a total of three buildings between them.

Fourth grade at Skagerak won first and second spots in the international Destination Imagination competition in 2012, which was held in Manchester, England. Skagerak International School was the only Norwegian school to participate. The class qualified for the finals which were arranged at the University of Tennessee in Knoxville on May 23-26th, 2012.

21 High School students at Skagerak attended a Habitat for Humanity trip to Cluj in the Transylvania region of Romania on June 23, 2012. The students raised money before traveling to Romania where they constructed houses for the poor. Besides Romania, Skagerak has arranged similar trips to Moshi, Tanzania since 1997, where students have built classrooms, toilets, washing facilities, and more.

Two developing projects in Nepal received 300,000 NOK after a fundraiser by Skagerak in 2014. Rotary International donated 2,50 NOK for every 1 NOK the school collected for the projects. 26 students traveled to Nepal in the fall of 2014 to check up on the projects. The school has done similar fundraising with projects in Ladakh in the Himalayan part of India.

In the 2014 school year, international trips were offered to Spain, Germany, Nepal, Paris, France, and Geneva, Switzerland. High School and Middle School students traveled to Rongai, Kenya in the summer of 2016 as part of the Global Awareness Project.

Skagerak International became the first Norwegian school to attend the international conference operated by Future Problem Solving Program International in the United States in 2018. Skagerak students traveled to University of Wisconsin–La Crosse in 2018 to compete against 2,200 students from throughout the world in the academic competitions where students apply critical thinking and problem-solving skills to hypothetical future situations.

Skagerak International School will open an elementary school and a middle school in Tønsberg, Norway in the fall of 2020. The schools will be located in the former facilities of Slottsfjellskolen, a building near Tønsberg Fortress which was designed by Henrik Thrap-Meyer in the 1880s.

== Accreditations and affiliations ==
Skagerak is a member of the Norwegian Association For Private Schools (NFFL). The High School is also a member of UNESCO's SOUL project. It is accredited by the Norwegian Department of Education and Science.

The school's mission is: "To inspire, guide and challenge students to be actively involved in a caring and committed internationally-minded and bilingual community; engaging students in learning that enables them to succeed and encouraging them to assume responsibility."

== Rankings ==
National tests in 2010 found Skagerak Middle School to be the second-best middle school in Norway.

The first release of national High School scores by the Ministry of Education and Research in 2016 found Skagerak to be one of the best in Norway.

== Playmaker Theatre ==
Skagerak's Playmaker Theatre, previously known as Sandefjord Playmakers, was established in 2011. The theatre group's first production, a rendition of Peer Gynt by Henrik Ibsen, was performed at Sandefjord Spa in April 2012. In April 2013, they performed The Wizard of Oz and the performances were moved to Verdensteatret (The World Theatre) at Konges gate 1 in Oslo. The 2014 theatrical production was Romeo and Juliet, while C.S. Lewis’ Narnia: The Lion, the Witch and the Wardrobe was featured in 2015. The 2016 production was a rendition of J.R.R. Tolkien’s The Hobbit, in 2017 Oliver Twist, and the 2018 production was a reenactment of George Orwell’s Animal Farm. The 2019 production is Louise Carroll's Alice in Wonderland “Treasure Island” “Midnight Summer’s Dream”
