= Bjørkelangen Upper Secondary School =

School in Bjørkelangen, Norway

Coordinates: 59°53′18.6″N 11°34′54.6″E

Bjørkelangen Videregående Skole is located in the town of Bjørkelangen in Aurskog-Høland municipality in Norway. It is a college with approximately 650 students.

It offers the following study focus areas: General high school education, business and administration, sales and service, health and social, mechanical studies, arts, and sports studies.
