= Bjørkelangen (lake) =

Lake in Aurskog-Høland, Norway

- Location within Akershus
- Location: Aurskog-Høland (Akershus)
- Coordinates: 59°50′46″N 11°31′42″E
- Basin countries: Norway
- Surface area: 2.86 km^{2} (1.10 sq mi)
- Shore length^{1}: 14.07 km (8.74 mi)
- Surface elevation: 124 m (407 ft)
- References: NVE
- ^{1} Shore length is not a well-defined measure.

Bjørkelangen is a lake in the municipality of Aurskog-Høland in Akershus county, Norway.

== See also ==
- List of lakes in Norway
