= Sandefjord Spa =

Spa in Norway

Coordinates: 59.1282°N 10.2285°E

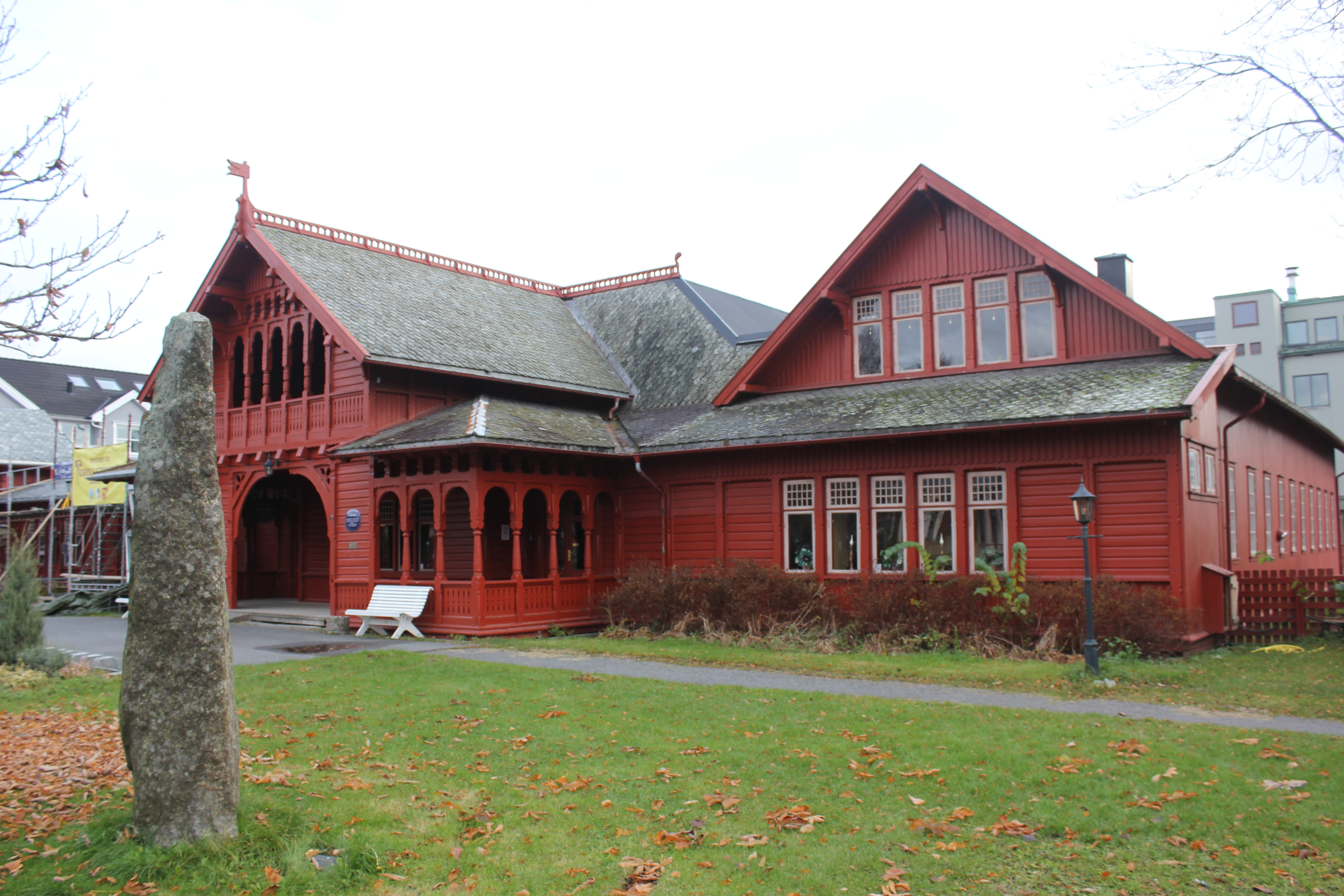
The 1899 "Kurbadet" in Sandefjord, Norway is made in dragestil ("style of a dragon").

Sandefjord Spa (Norwegian: Sandefjord Kurbad, often shortened to Kurbadet), was a spa in Sandefjord, Norway, established by Heinrich Arnold Thaulow in 1837. The main building from 1899 is one of the largest wooden buildings in Norway and in the Nordic countries overall. Kurbadet was one of Europe's most visited baths in the late 1800s. Royalty and Prime Ministers from throughout Europe visited the spa in the late 1800s. It was the first spa in Sandefjord and functioned as a medical institution focusing on the treatment of symptoms for rheumatic diseases. A majority of spa visitors were from Norway, but international guests from Germany, Britain and the United States also visited Kurbadet.

The spa was open from 1837 until 1939, when it became a municipal property. The buildings are now housing a café, bar, gallery, and a host of local associations. The bath's original building from 1899 is made in style of a dragon and is located in the city centre. Tours of Kurbadet can be scheduled.

Badeparken, or "the Bathing Park", is located nearby and was established by the spa in 1902.

== History ==
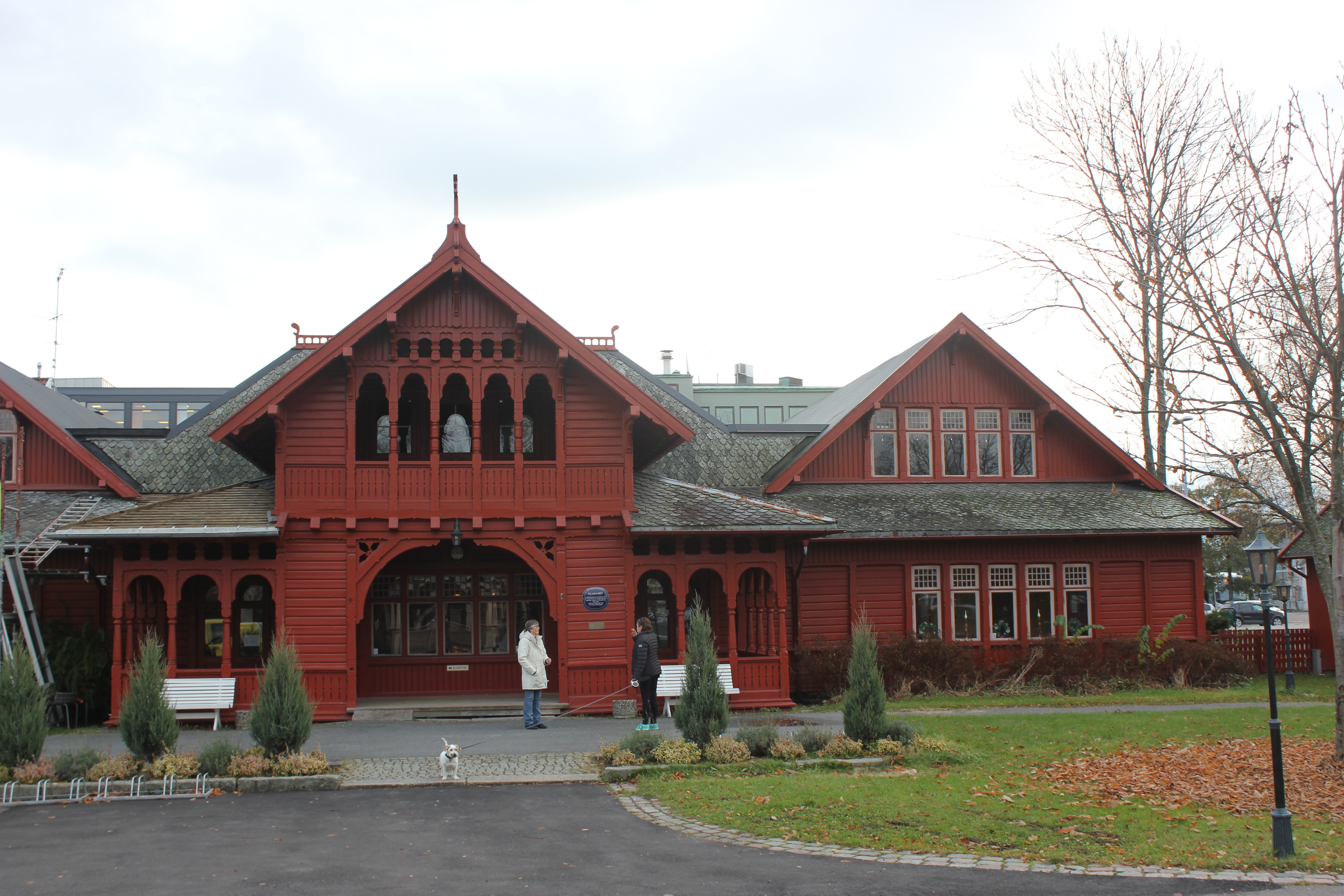

The spa first opened its doors on 1 August 1837. The original installations were based on seawater tub baths and mud baths. When a sulfur source was found in 1838, the spa began offering sulfurous water for bathing. The spa became one of the most popular spas in Europe but fell into disrepair after World War II. The city council voted in 1980 to restore the spa as a cultural monument.

Sandefjord Spa was established in the mid-1800s by Dr Thaulow, the city's first physician. It was located in a large wooden structure at Bryggegaten, and guests were treated sulphur baths and were offered saltwater baths at Strømbadet. Among the spa's notable visitors were Henrik Ibsen, Svend Foyn, Camilla Collett, Adolph Tidemand, and members of the royal family. The spa later expanded when Dr Thaulow purchased Hjertnes Hovedgård, a large farm by the city harbor, now home to Park Hotel. The building, Socitetsbygningen, was equipped with a restaurant, reading hall, smoking room and pool tables. The bath's own orchestra practiced in the hall.

== Notable visitors ==
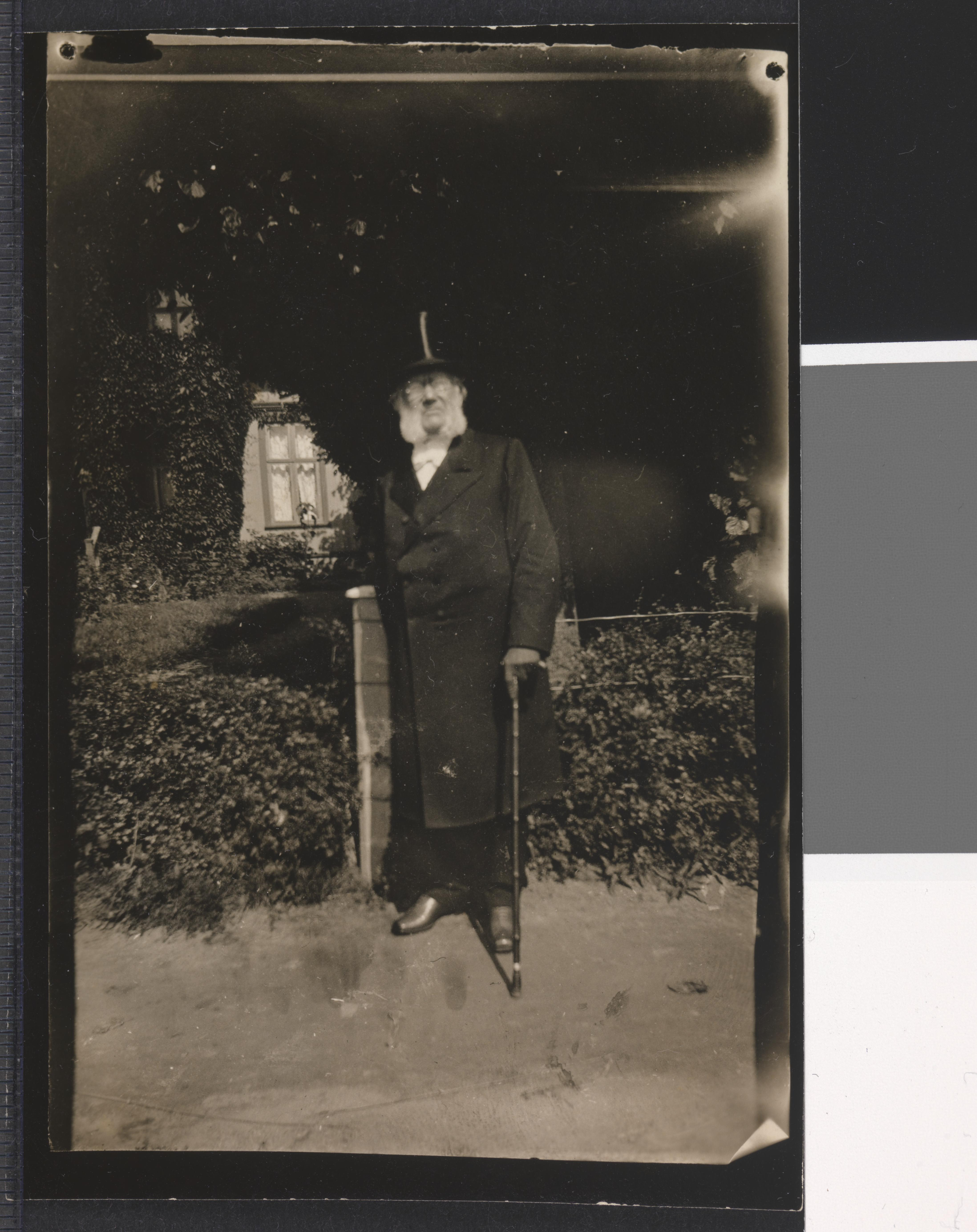
Henrik Ibsen visiting Kurbadet, summer of 1900.

Some notable visitors to the spa included:

- Henrik Ibsen, playwright and theatre director
- Johan Sebastian Welhaven, author and poet
- Adolph Tidemand, painter
- Hans Gude, painter
- Camilla Collet, author
- Crown Princess Louise
- Crown Prince Charles XV
- Louise of Sweden
- Prince Frederick of the Netherlands
- King Oscar I of Sweden
- Prince Oscar II of Norway
