= Langhaugen videregående skole =

Secondary school in Bergen, Norway

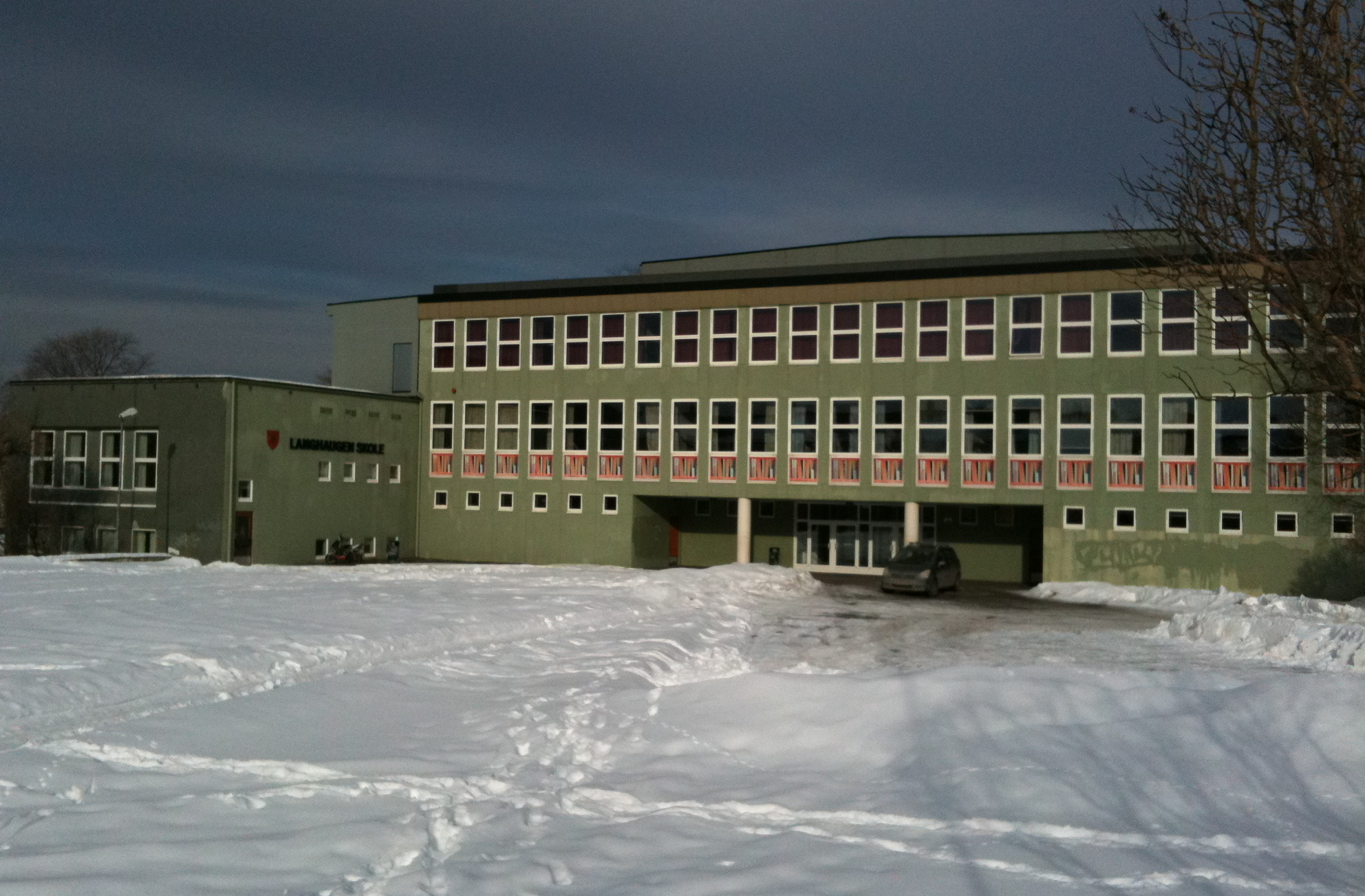

Address
- Hagerups vei 17; 5093 Bergen; Norway
- Coordinates: 60°21′45″N 5°21′42″E

Information
- Type: Secondary school
- Motto: Kunnskap og kreativitet - Trivsel og takhøyde (Knowledge and creativity - Well-being and tolerance)
- Established: 1960
- Authority: Vestland fylkeskommune
- Head teacher: Tore Tveit
- Staff: 89
- Grades: VG1–VG3
- Gender: coeducational
- Age range: 16–19
- Enrollment: 623 (2018)
- Language: Norwegian
- Website: las.hfk.no

Langhaugen videregående skole (formerly Langhaugen gymnas) is a county upper secondary school in Årstad, a suburb of Bergen. The school opened in 1961 as a replacement for Sydneshaugen skole, which is now used by the University of Bergen; the school building was designed by the city architect Eystein Michalsen. It offers specialised study in music, dance and drama. In 2018 it was the fourth most popular school at its level in Bergen by enrollment.

== Educational offerings ==
Langhaugen VGS offers French, German, and Spanish as foreign languages in addition to English, which is a requirement. It has five classes at each grade level for study specialisation, plus one for music, dance and drama with a specialisation in music and one for music, dance and drama with a specialisation in dance, a total of 21 classes for around 600 students. The music specialisation was first offered in 1986, dance in 1997. The reviewers for Bergens Tidende praised the school musical highly in both 2021 and 2022, when the school celebrated its 60th anniversary.

In 2020, the county council of Vestland decided to extend the school's facilities for dance and physical education by renovation and addition of a new building, making possible the addition of another class in music, and to explore having the school open after hours as a culture house.

== Alumni ==
- Anne-Grete Strøm-Erichsen (politician)
- Erna Solberg (politician)
- Frank Hammersland (musician)
- Karoline Krüger (musician)
- Marte Mjøs Persen (politician)
- Sondre Lerche (musician)
- Tor Endresen (musician)
