= Bleiker Upper Secondary School =

High School in Asker, Norway

Coordinates: 59.8268°N 10.4454°E

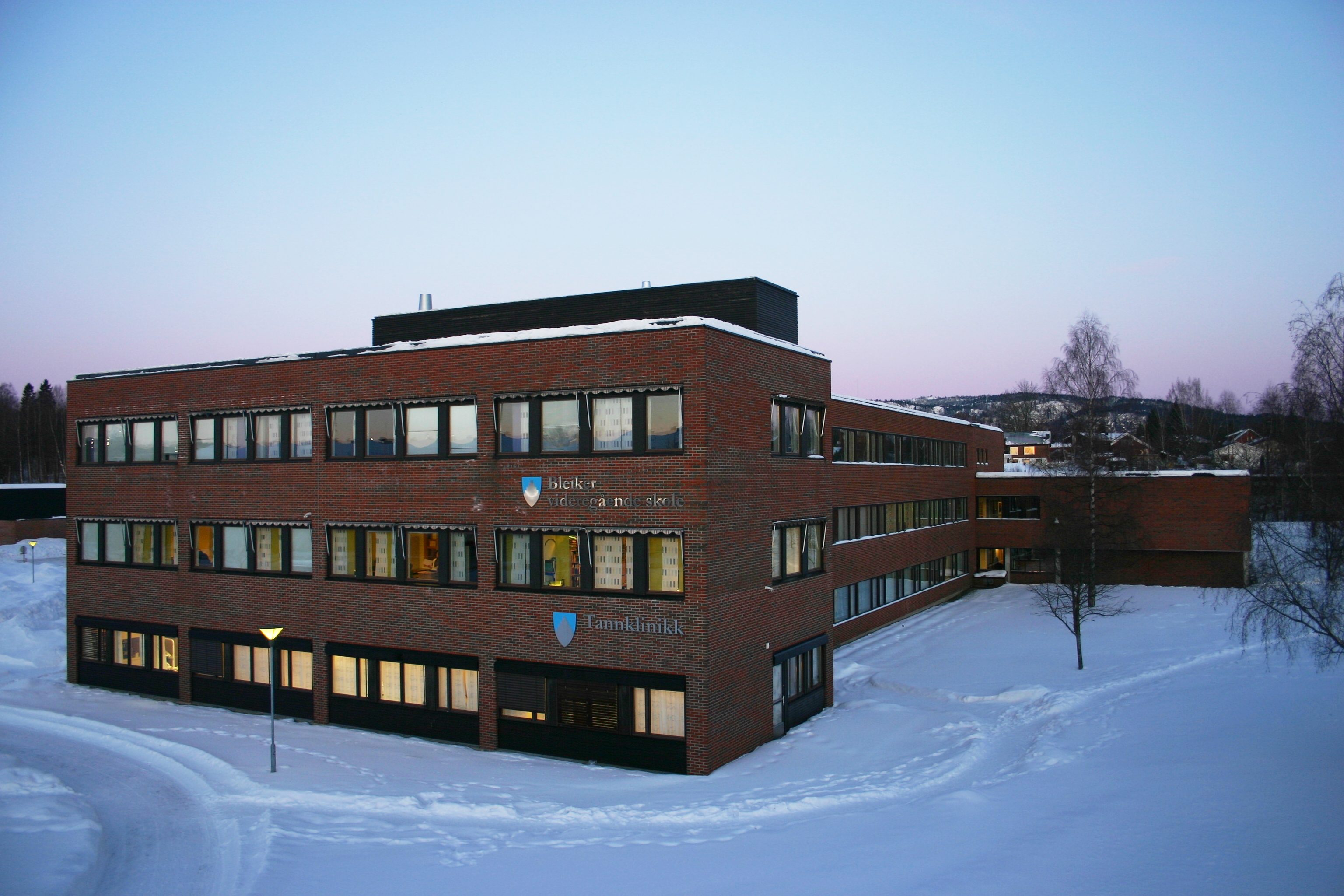
Bleiker videregående High School

Bleiker High School (Bleiker videregående skole) is located in Asker, Norway. The school was established in 1969 under the name Asker vocational school and was the first vocational school in Asker . Previously, students would take vocational education go to Sandvika. But in 1967, two branch classes in Asker, and they became the basis for the new school was the first time lived in many places. After 10 years it got its own school building in 1979.

== 1979 ==
The school had five specializations in 1979:

- Craftse and Industrial ( HI )
- Home Economics ( HH )
- Arts & Crafts ( HE)
- Social and Health (SH)
- Trade and Commercial Subjects

== 2010 ==
In 2010 the school had these specializations;

- Alternative Education
- Electrical
- Restaurant and Food Processing
- Service and Transport
- Studiespesialisering Design Studies
- Technical and Industrial Production
- Specialization in general studies, economic and administrative sciences
- Media and Communication
- Music, dance and drama
- Alternative education

In autumn 2010 the Health and Social Care specializations returned to Bleiker.
