= Scandic Park Hotel =

Hotel in Sandefjord, Norway

Coordinates: 59°07′38″N 10°13′15″E

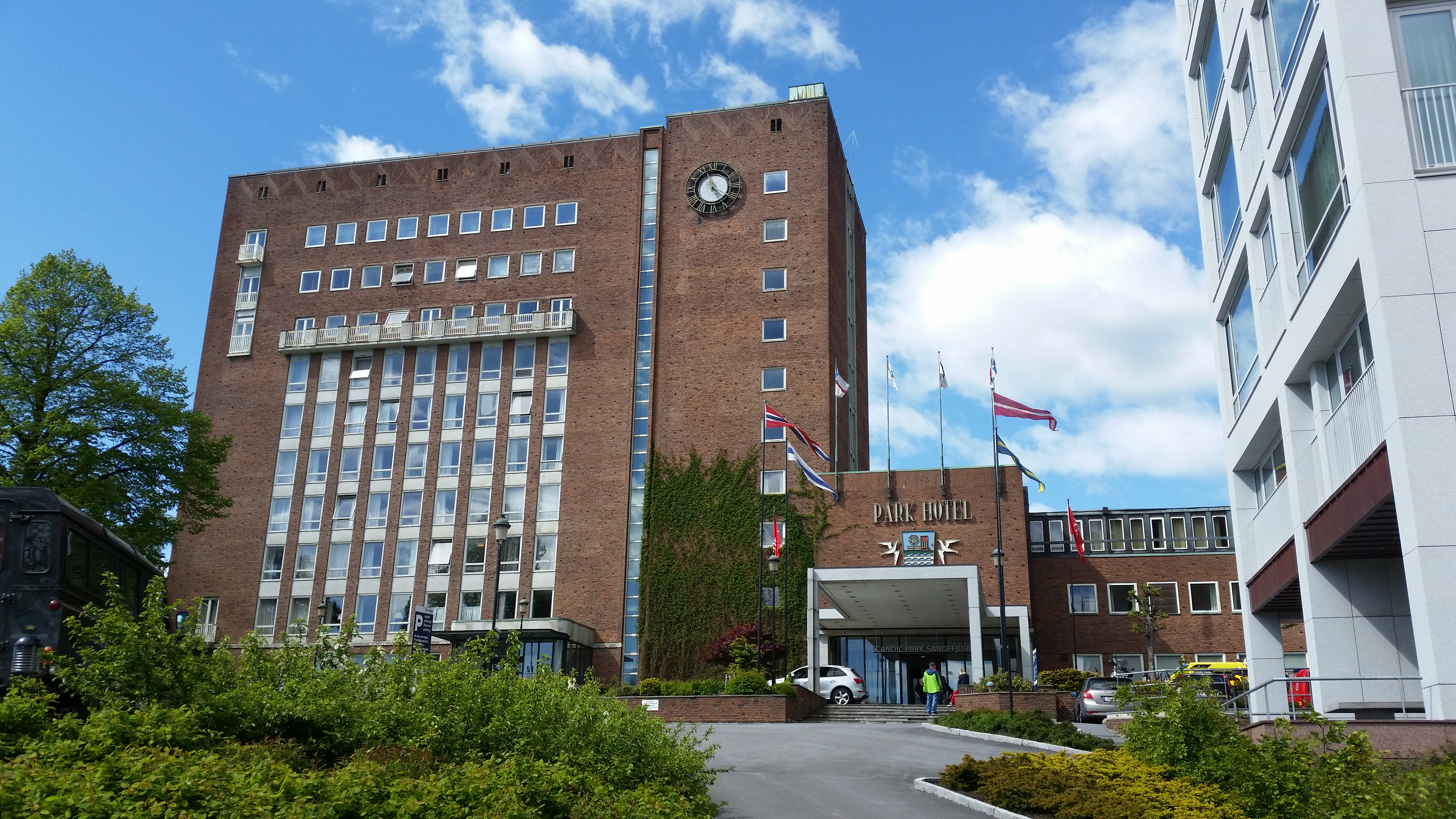
- Former names: Rica Park Hotel, Hvalfangstens Hus

General information
- Location: Strandpromenaden 9; 3208 Sandefjord, Norway
- Opening: 1959
- Owner: Scandic Hotels
- Operator: Scandic Hotels

Technical details
- Floor count: 8

Design and construction
- Architect: Arnstein Arneberg
- Developer: Anders Jahre

Other information
- Number of rooms: 349
- Number of restaurants: 3

Website
- http://scandic-park-sandefjord-hotel.hotel-ds.com/en/

Scandic Park Hotel (formerly Rica Park Hotel) is a large hotel in Sandefjord, Norway. The Park Hotel was completed in 1960 and was the largest and most luxurious hotel in Vestfold County when established. Park Hotel was built on a site that previously belonged to Sandefjord Spa. It is located next to the harbor and near the city center. It caters for conferences, business functions, and courses. Most rooms overlook the Sandefjordsfjord. The hotel houses three restaurants: Parkstuen, Kosmos, and Vinstuen. It has spa facilities, gyms, solariums, saltwater swimming pools, saunas, conference halls, and a banquet hall.

The hotel was designed by architect Arnstein Arneberg, and opened as “The Whaling House” (Hvalfangstens Hus) in 1959. It was frequently visited by the shipping magnate Anders Jahre.

A whale jawbone arch from a Blue whale killed in 1956 has been placed outside the hotel.

== History ==
The first parts of Hvalfangstens Hus were completed in the fall of 1959. The hotel was built on the former site of Socitetsbygningen which belonged to Sandefjord Spa. In the 1950s, Socitetsbygningen were demolished to give room to Hvalfangstens Hus (the Whaling House).

When it was established as Hvalfangstens Hus, the eighth floor was occupied by offices for Norges Hvalfangstforbund and other whaling organizations. The ninth and tenth floors occupied Anders Jahre's business offices. The hotel became the basis for modern-day tourism in Sandefjord. The Oslo City Hall was one of architect Arnstein Arneberg’s inspirations when designing the hotel. Park Hotel was highly modern for its time in the 1960s and had maids equipped with teletypewriters, waiters equipped with radio receivers, and electric doors. In 1967, a heated seawater swimming pool and spa were installed at the hotel. The hotel has views of the adjacent park Badeparken, surrounding hillsides, and the Sandefjord Harbor and Sandefjordsfjord.

== Gallery ==
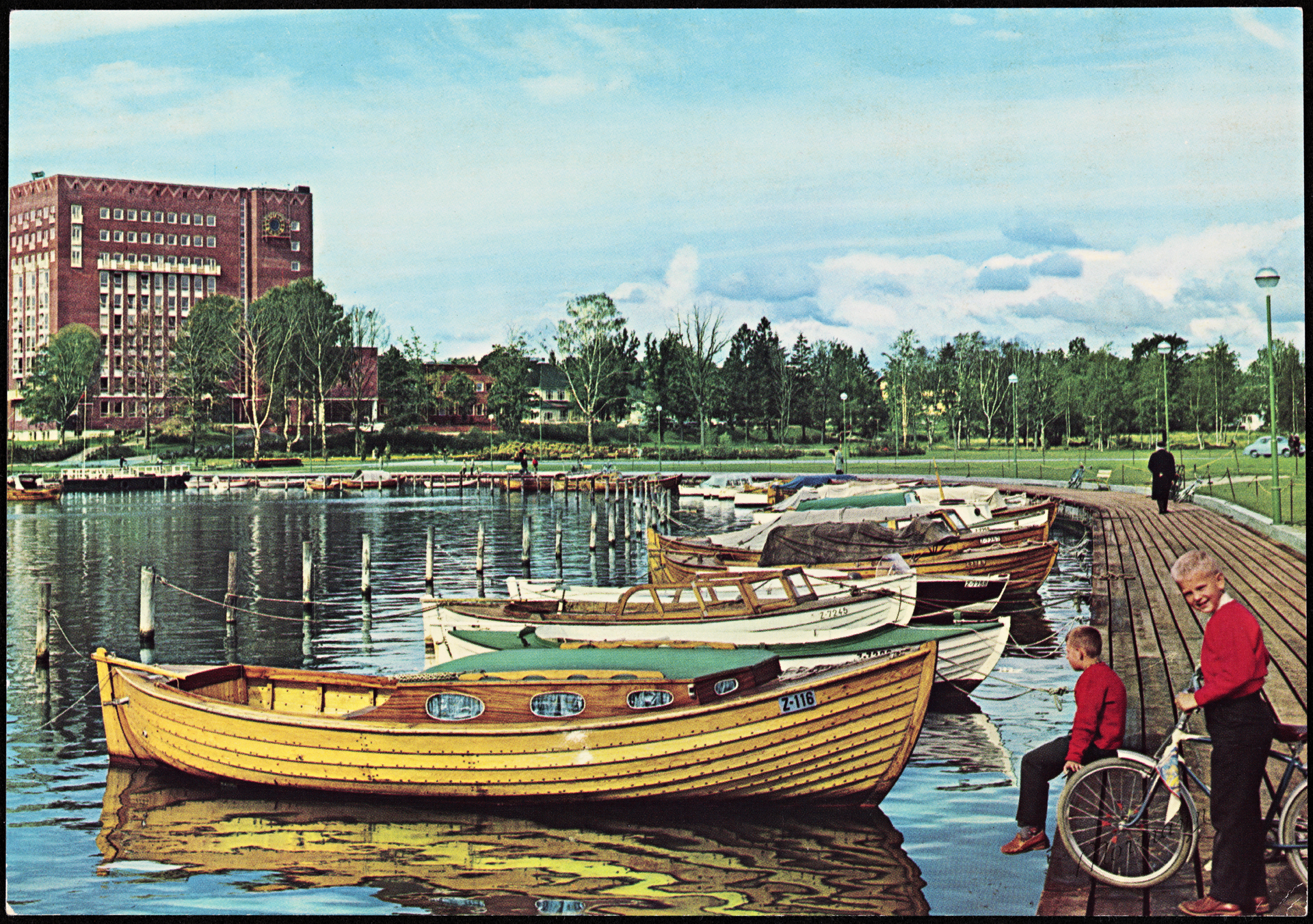

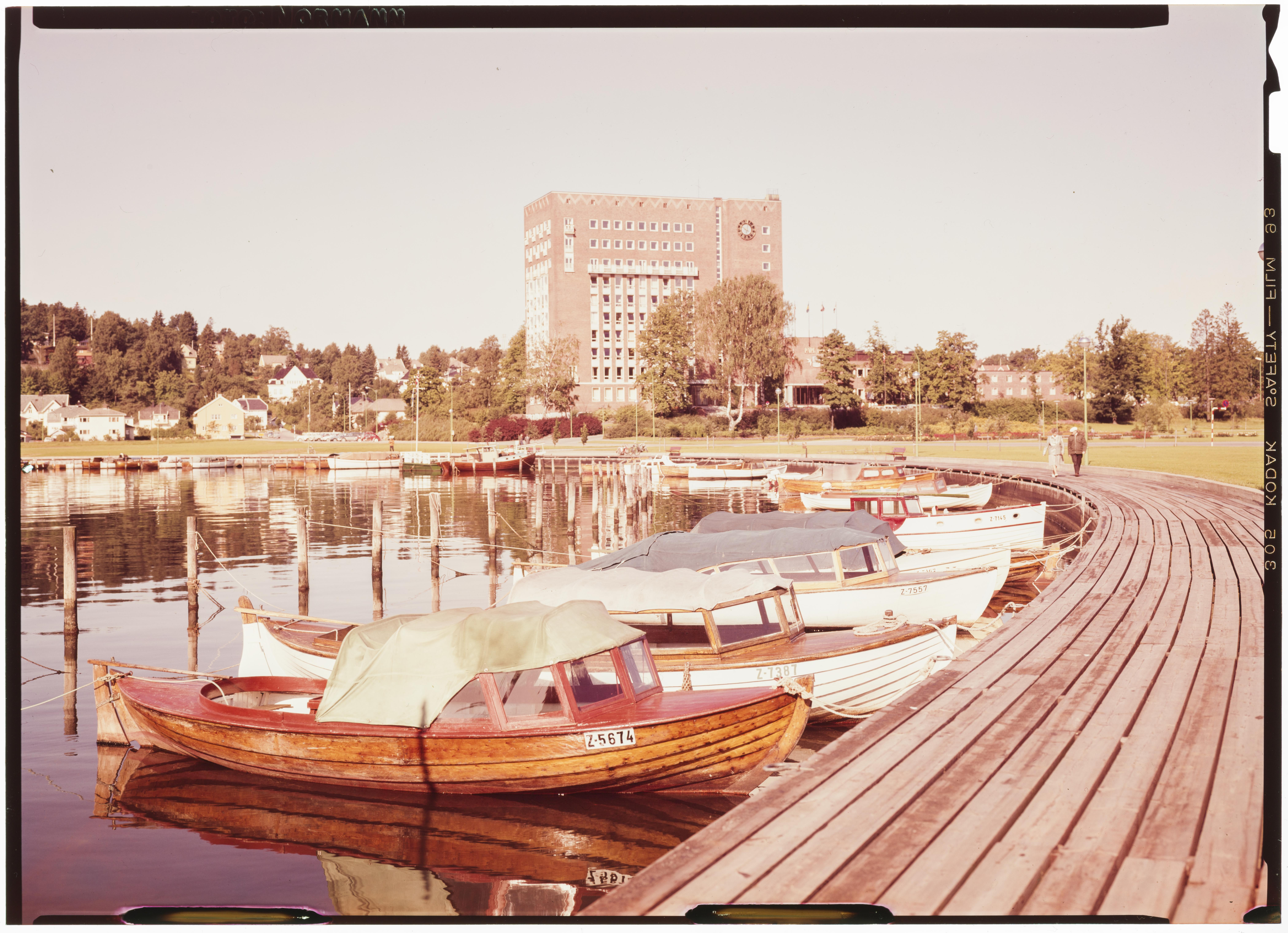

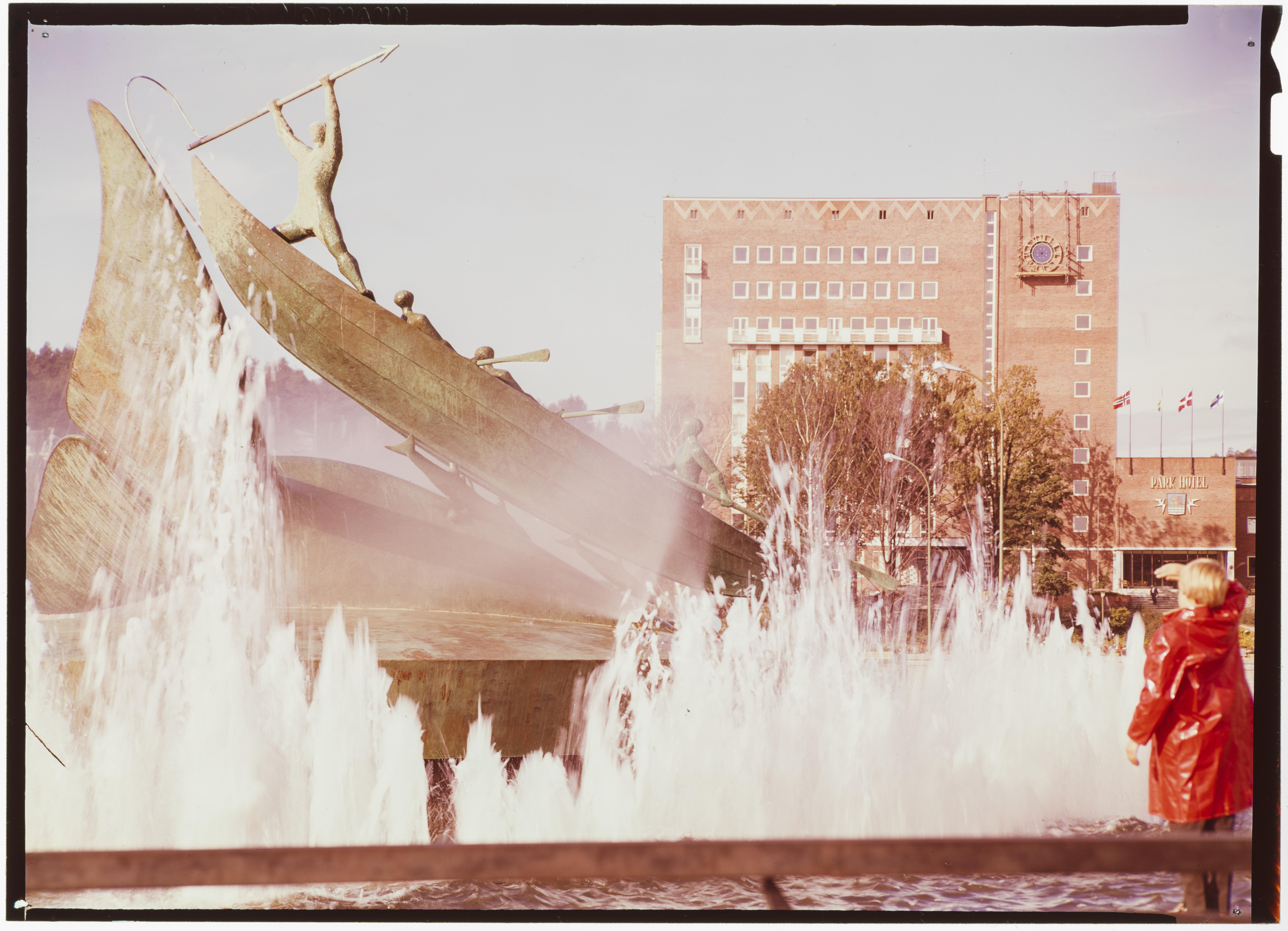

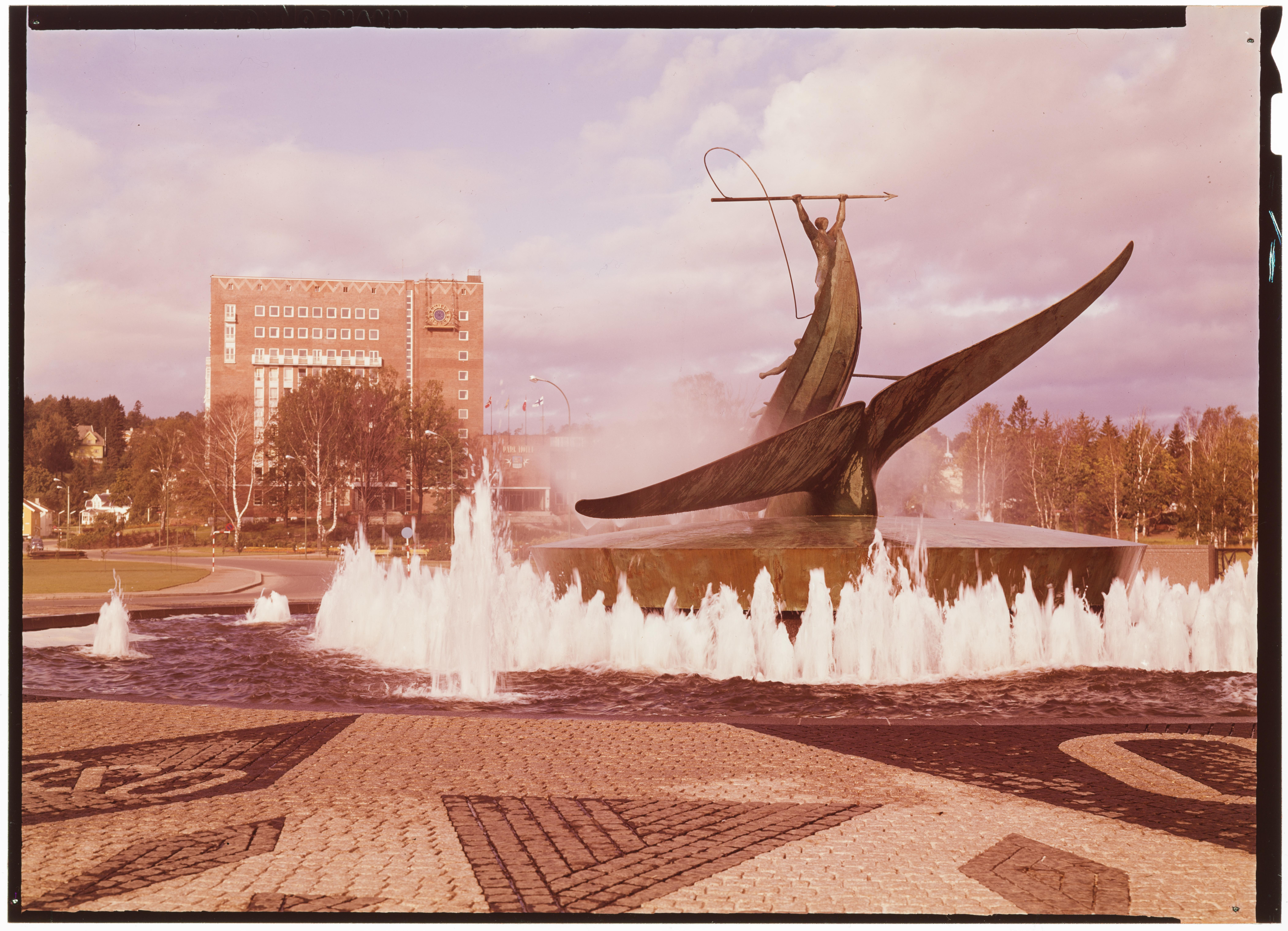

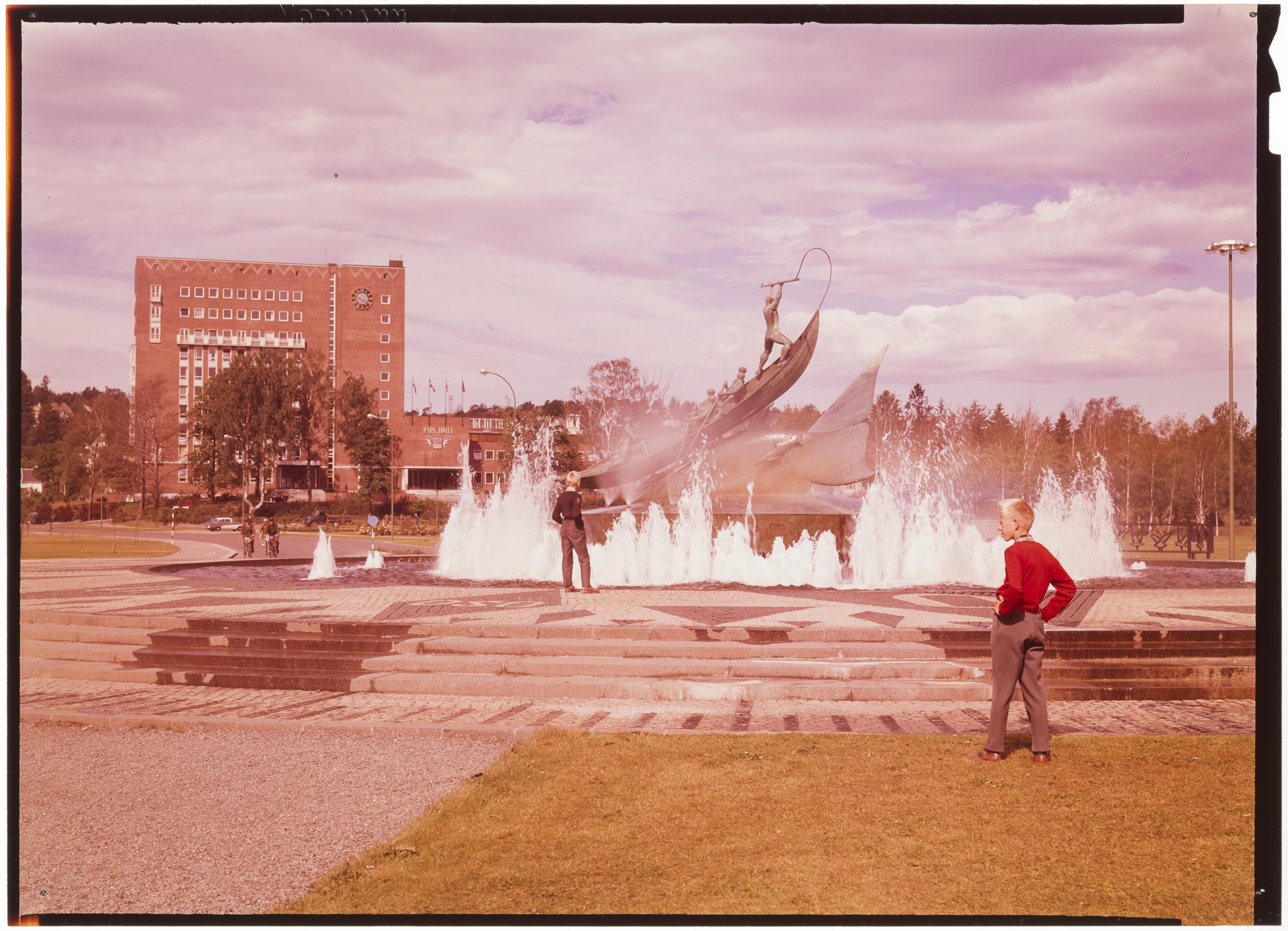

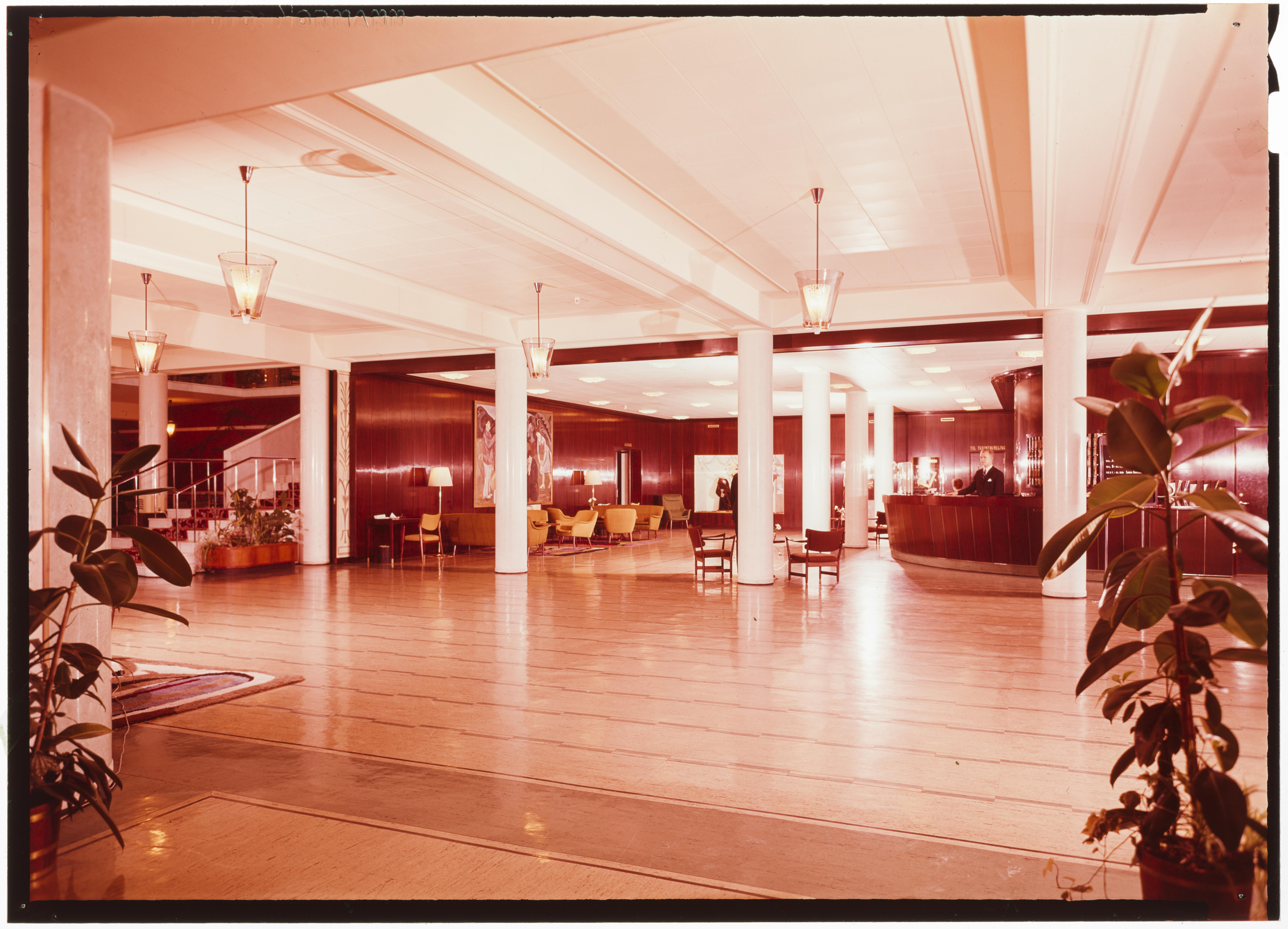

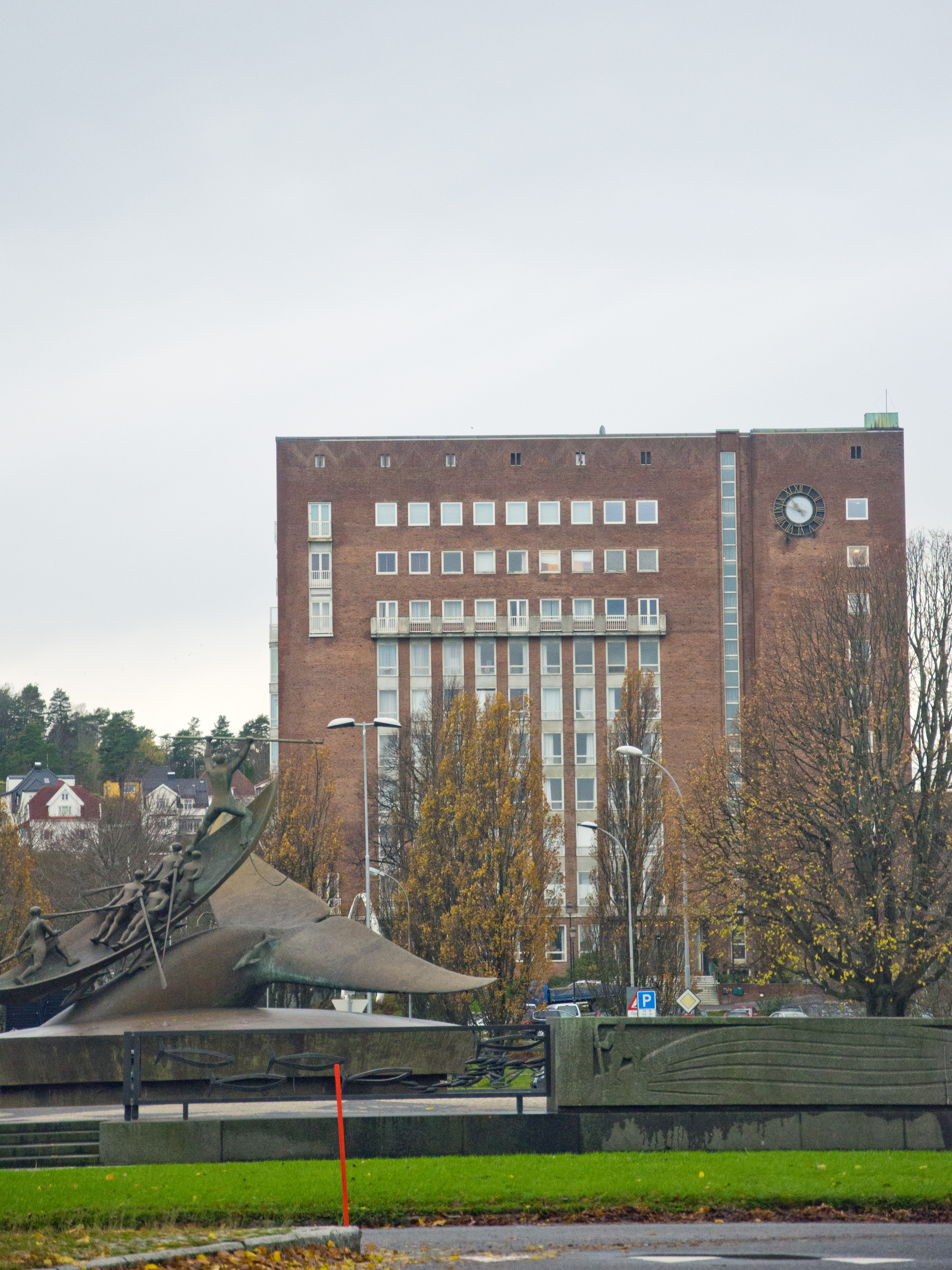

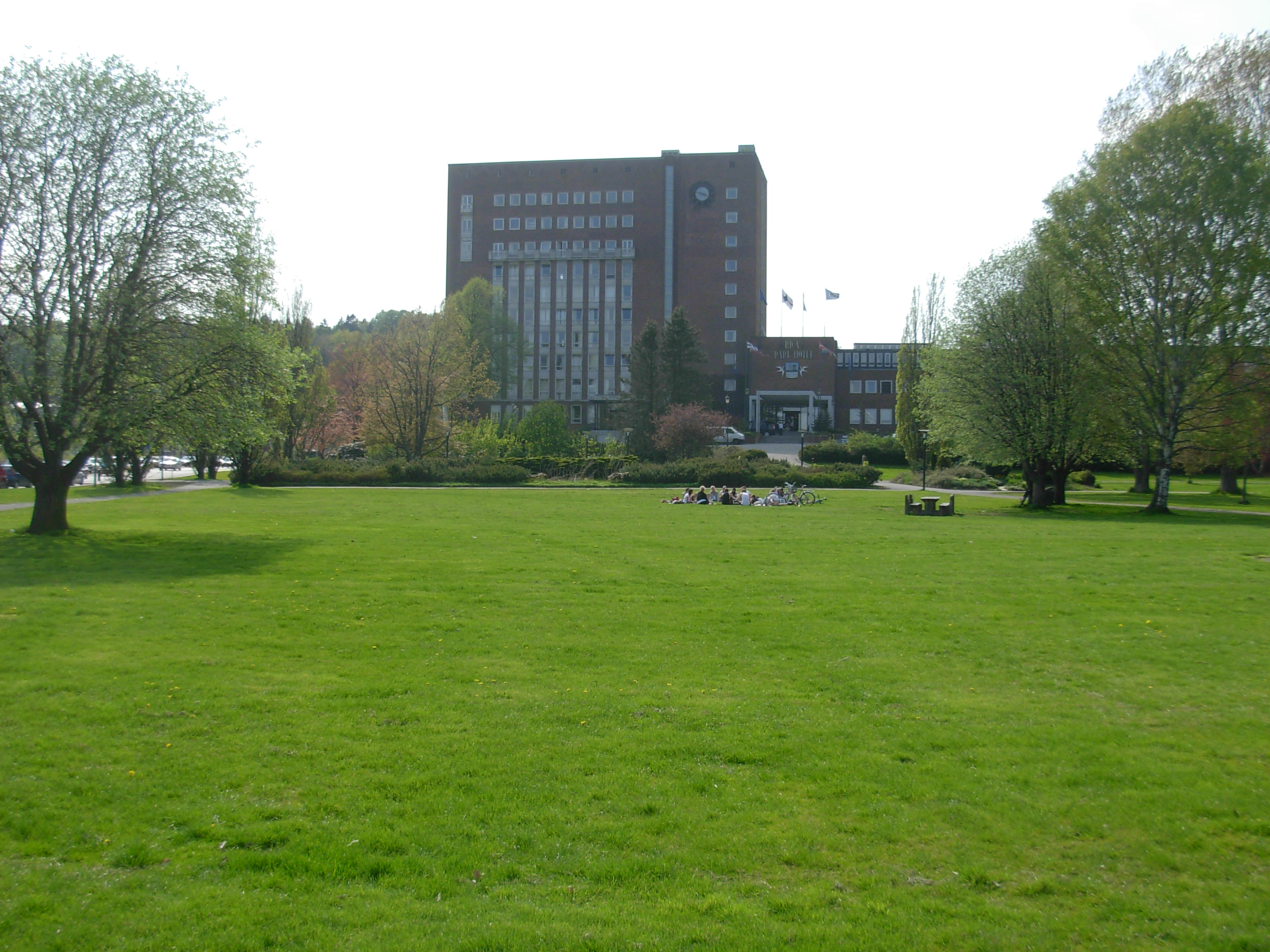
