= Kvadraturen Upper Secondary School =

Coordinates: 58.1489°N 8.0017°E

Location
- Tollbodgata 75; Kvadraturen, Kristiansand, Agder 4614; Norway

Information
- Type: Public high school
- Motto: Her er du, og blir noe (Here are you, and become something)
- Established: 1812 (as a Sunday school)
- Principal: Preben Skogen
- Enrollment: 1100
- Color: Green Orange
- Website: Official website
- of

Kvadraturen Upper Secondary, Kvadraturen videregående skole, former Kvadraturen skolesenter, is a public high school in Kristiansand, Norway. It is one of the largest high school in Southern Norway. It first opened as a Sunday school in 1812. The school has two blocks on 4 and 5 floors with a skywalk between both. On the bottom floor of the old building is where the cafeteria and the library is located, while the new building is mostly classrooms and offices. The lines at the school is studies, electricians and technology servicing, health and youth development, specialization and supplementary general admission and alternative learning.
