= Lambertseter Upper Secondary School =

- Lambertseter videregående skole
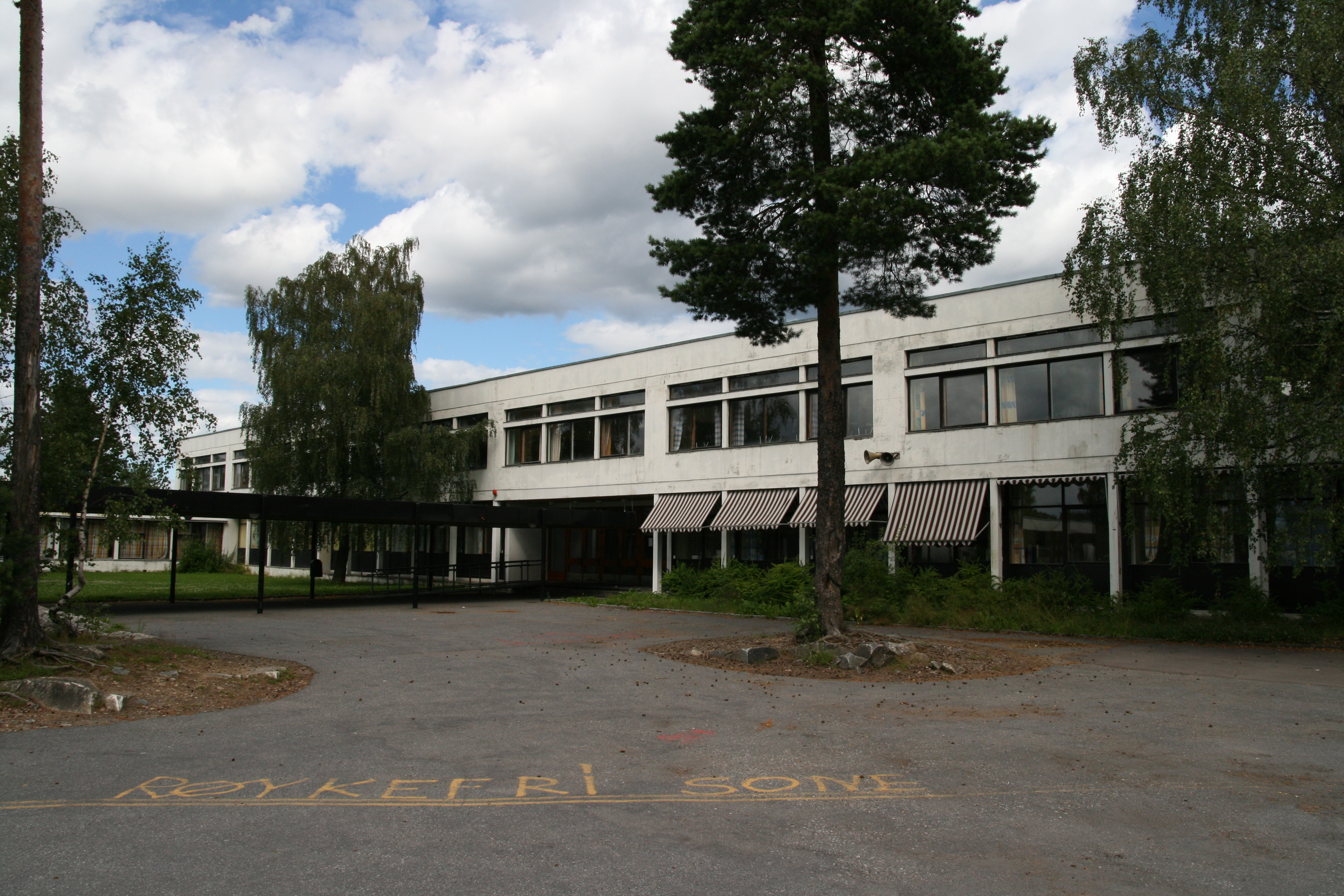
- Lambertseter Upper Secondary School

Location
- Cecilie Thoresens vei 6 Oslo; Norway
- Coordinates: 59°52′44.234″N 10°48′34.531″E

Information
- School type: Public secondary school
- Founded: 1961
- Headmaster: Siv Jacobsen
- Staff: 100
- Grades: 11–13
- Age range: 16–19
- Enrollment: 855
- Classes offered: General education Sports studies
- Language: Norwegian; English
- Campus: Suburban
- Website: https://lambertseter.vgs.no/

Lambertseter Upper Secondary School (Norwegian: Lambertseter videregående skole) is a public upper secondary school located in the district of Nordstrand in Oslo, Norway. The school was established in 1961 and offers general academics (the college preparatory studiespesialisering of the Norwegian school system) and sports studies. The school also has a special section for severely multihandicapped students. It currently has a total of about 855 students and 100 employees.
