= List of boarding schools =

List of notable boarding schools by country

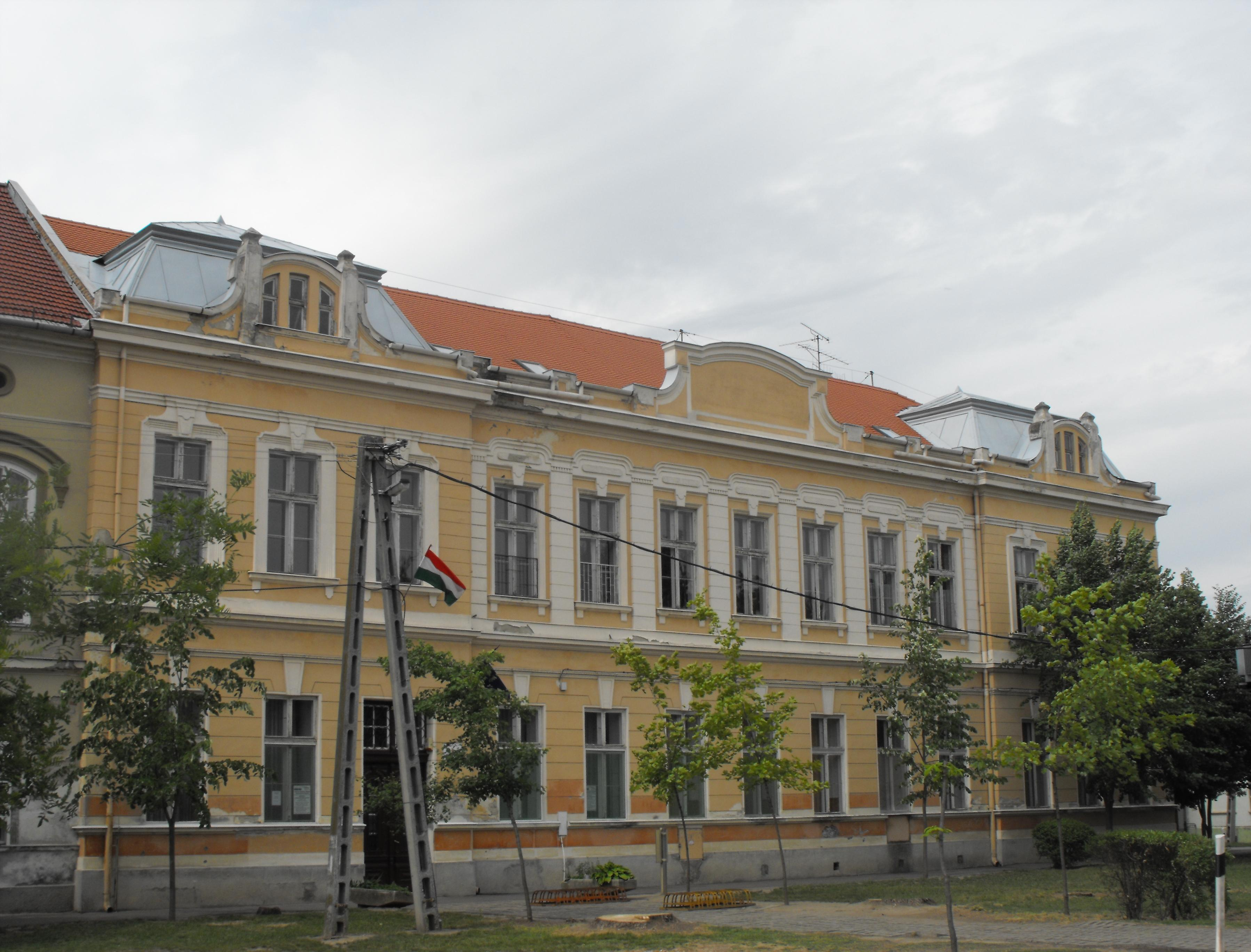
The Makó boarding school

This is a list of notable boarding schools, where some or all pupils study and live during the school year.

== Africa ==
=== Cameroon ===
- Our Lady of Lourdes College, Mankon
- Sacred Heart College, Bamenda
- Saker Baptist College, Limbe

=== Gambia ===
- Armitage High School

=== Ghana ===
- Aburi Girls' Senior High School
- Accra Academy
- Accra Girls Senior High School
- Achimota School
- Adisadel College
- Aggrey Memorial A.M.E. Zion Senior High School
- Anglican Senior High School, Kumasi
- Archbishop Porter Girls' School
- Ghana National College
- Holy Child School
- Koforidua Senior High Technical School
- Kumasi Academy
- Kumasi High School
- Mfantsiman Girls' Senior High School
- Mfantsipim School
- Ofori Panin Senior High School
- Opoku Ware School
- Pope John Senior High School and Minor Seminary
- Prempeh College
- Presbyterian Boys' Secondary School
- St. Augustine's College
- St. Louis Secondary School
- St. Monica's School
- St Rose's Girls Secondary School
- Wesley Girls' Senior High School

=== Kenya ===
- Brookhouse School
- Nairobi Academy
- Rift Valley Academy
- Saint Andrews School

=== Malawi ===
- Bishop Mackenzie International School
- Kamuzu Academy
- Saint Andrews International High School

=== Namibia ===
- Deutsche Höhere Privatschule Windhoek

=== Nigeria ===
- Apata Memorial High School
- Bristol Academy, Abuja
- Federal Government Girls' College, Owerri
- Landmark University Secondary School
- Loyola Jesuit College
- Mea Mater Elizabeth High School
- Olashore International School

=== Rwanda ===
- Ecole des Sciences Byimana

=== South Africa ===
- Afrikaanse Hoër Meisieskool
- Afrikaanse Hoër Seunskool
- African Leadership Academy
- Cornwall Hill College
- Dale College Boys' High School, Qonce
- Diocesan College
- Diocesan School for Girls, Makhanda
- Durban Girls' College
- Durban High School
- Glenwood High School
- Graeme College, Makhanda
- Grey College, Bloemfontein
- Grey High School
- Helpmekaar Kollege
- Heritage Academy, Pietermaritzburg
- Herschel Girls' School
- Hilton College
- Jeppe High School for Boys
- Kearsney College
- King Edward VII School, Johannesburg
- Kingswood College
- Maritzburg College
- Michaelhouse
- Oprah Winfrey Leadership Academy for Girls
- Paarl Boys' High School
- Parktown Boys' High School
- Paul Roos Gymnasium
- Penryn College
- Pinelands High School
- Pretoria Boys High School
- Pretoria High School for Girls
- Queen's College, Queenstown
- Rhenish Girls' High School
- Roedean School
- Rondebosch Boys' High School
- Rustenburg School for Girls
- Selborne College
- South African College Schools
- St. Alban's College
- St. Andrew's College, Makhanda
- St. Anne's Diocesan College
- St Benedict's College, Bedfordview
- St. Charles College, Pietermaritzburg
- St David's Marist, Inanda
- St. John's College, Johannesburg
- St. Mary's Diocesan School for Girls, Kloof
- St Stithians College
- Stanford Lake College
- Stirling High School, East London
- Treverton Preparatory School and College, Mooi River
- Victoria Girls' High School, Makhanda
- The Wykeham Collegiate
- Wynberg Boys' High School
- Wynberg Girls' High School

=== Eswatini ===
- Waterford Kamhlaba

=== Tanzania ===
- Isamilo International School Mwanza
- School of St Jude
- St Mary's Mbeya Secondary School
- United World College East Africa

=== Uganda ===
- King's College, Budo
- Mbarara High School
- Rainbow International School
- Taibah College School

=== Zambia ===
- Banani International Secondary School
- Baobab College
- Ibenga Girls Secondary School
- Chengelo Secondary School
- Ellensmere High School
- Mbereshi Girls' School
- Musikili Primary School
- Sakeji School
- St. Mary's Minor Seminary, Chipata

=== Zimbabwe ===
- Bernard Mizeki College
- Chaplin High School
- Chinhoyi High School
- Chisipite Senior School
- Christian Brothers College, Bulawayo
- Churchill School
- Cornway College
- Eaglesvale Senior School
- Ellis Robins School
- Falcon College
- Fletcher High School
- Girls' College
- Gokomere High School
- Goldridge College
- Goromonzi High School
- Hillcrest College
- Inyathi High School
- Jameson High School
- Kutama College
- Kwenda Mission
- Kyle College
- Lingfield Christian Academy
- Lomagundi College
- Marist Brothers Secondary School, Dete
- Mazowe Boys High School
- Midlands Christian College
- Moleli High School
- Monte Cassino Girls High School
- Mzingwane High School
- Peterhouse Boys' School
- Peterhouse Girls' School
- Plumtree School
- Prince Edward School
- Rufaro High School
- Saint Alberts High School
- St Dominic's Chishawasha
- St. Faith's School, Rusape
- St George's College
- St Ignatius College
- Watershed College

== Asia ==
=== Armenia ===
- Monte Melkonian Military College
- Chinese-Armenian Friendship School
- UWC Dilijan

=== Bangladesh ===
- Barishal Cadet College
- Cumilla Cadet College
- Faujdarhat Cadet College
- Feni Girls' Cadet College
- Jhenaidah Cadet College
- Joypurhat Girls' Cadet College
- Mirzapur Cadet College
- Mymensingh Girls' Cadet College
- Pabna Cadet College
- Rajshahi Cadet College
- Rangpur Cadet College
- Sylhet Cadet College
- Dhaka Residential Model College
- International Hope School Bangladesh

=== Brunei ===
- Jerudong International School

=== China ===
- Chefoo School
- Dingwen Academy Hangzhou
- English School Attached to Guangdong University of Foreign Studies
- Guangdong Country Garden School
- Shanghai Foreign Language School
- Shanghai Pinghe School

=== Hong Kong ===
- Buddhist Fat Ho Memorial College
- Diocesan Boys' School
- Harrow International School Hong Kong
- Hong Kong Adventist College
- Jockey Club Ti-I College
- Li Po Chun United World College
- Pui Kiu Middle School
- St. Paul's Co-educational College
- St. Stephen's College
- United Christian College (Kowloon East)

=== Indonesia ===
- Pesantren
- Taruna Nusantara

=== Japan ===
- Columbia International School
- NUCB International College
- Hokkaido International School
- Rugby School Japan
- UWC ISAK Japan

=== Kazakhstan ===
- Haileybury Almaty

=== South Korea ===
Most international, foreign language high schools and self-regulated schools in South Korea are boarding schools.

- Branksome Hall Asia, Seogwipo, Jejudo
- Bugil Academy, Cheonan, South Chungcheong Province
- Cheongshim International Academy, Gapyeong, Gyeonggi Province
- Gyeonggi Suwon International School, Suwon, Gyeonggi Province
- Hankuk Academy of Foreign Studies, Yongin, Gyeonggi Province
- KIS (Korea International School) Jeju, Seogwipo, Jejudo
- Korean Minjok Leadership Academy, Hoengseong, Gangwon Province
- Taejon Christian International School, Daejeon Metropolitan City

=== Malaysia ===
- Alam Shah Science Secondary School
- Kolej Islam Sultan Alam Shah
- Kolej Tunku Kurshiah
- Malay College Kuala Kangsar
- MARA Junior Science College
- Royal Military College
- Sekolah Alam Shah
- Sekolah Berasrama Penuh Integrasi Gombak
- Sekolah Berasrama Penuh Integrasi Jempol
- Sekolah Berasrama Penuh Integrasi Selandar
- Sekolah Datuk Abdul Razak
- Sekolah Menengah Agama Persekutuan Kajang
- Sekolah Menengah Agama Persekutuan Labu
- Sekolah Menengah Sains Hulu Selangor
- Sekolah Menengah Sains Johor
- Sekolah Menengah Sains Kuala Selangor
- Sekolah Menengah Sains Muar
- Sekolah Menengah Sains Muzaffar Shah
- Sekolah Menengah Sains Raja Tun Azlan Shah
- Sekolah Menengah Sains Sabah
- Sekolah Menengah Sains Selangor
- Sekolah Menengah Sains Seri Puteri
- Sekolah Menengah Sains Teluk Intan
- Sekolah Menengah Sains Tengku Muhammad Faris Petra
- Sekolah Menengah Sains Tuanku Jaafar
- Sekolah Menengah Sains Tuanku Munawir
- Sekolah Menengah Sains Tuanku Syed Putra
- Sekolah Menengah Sultan Abdul Halim
- Sekolah Tuanku Abdul Rahman

International schools:

- Dalat International School
- Kolej Tuanku Ja'afar
- Kolej Yayasan Saad
- Marlborough College Malaysia
- Uplands International School of Penang

=== Nepal ===
- Basu Higher Secondary School, Bhaktapur
- Birendra Sainik Awasiya Mahavidyalaya, Bhaktapur
- Budhanilkantha School, Kathmandu
- Chelsea International Academy
- Durbar High School, Kathmandu
- Emerald Academy, Jhapa
- Gandaki Boarding School, Pokhara
- Green Hills Academy, Kavresthali, Kathmandu
- Kathmandu University High School, Kathmandu
- Mount Everest Boarding School, Pokhara
- Nepal Police School
- Siddhartha Vanasthali Institute, Kathmandu

=== Pakistan ===
- Abbottabad Public School, Abbottabad
- Aitchison College, Lahore
- Army Burn Hall College, Abbottabad
- - Cadet College Fateh Jang
  - Cadet College Hasan Abdal
  - Cadet College Kohat
  - Cadet College Petaro
  - Cadet College Razmak
  - Cadet College Skardu
- Chand Bagh School, Muridke
- Divisional Public School Faisalabad
- Government College University, Lahore
- Lawrence College
- Mansehra International Public School and College
- Military College Jhelum
- Military College Murree
- Military College Sui
- PAF College Sargodha
- Sadiq Public School, Bahawalpur

=== Philippines ===
- Adventist University of the Philippines, Cavite
- Brent International School, Baguio

=== Singapore ===
- Anglo-Chinese School
- Dunman High School
- Hwa Chong Institution Boarding School
- Nanyang Girls' High School
- NUS High School of Math and Science
- Raffles Institution
- St. Andrew's Junior College
- St. Joseph's Institution
- Singapore Sports School
- River Valley High School
- United World College of South East Asia
- Victoria School
- Waseda Shibuya Senior High School

=== Thailand ===
- American Pacific International School, Chiang Mai
- Assumption College Sriracha
- British International School, Phuket
- Bromsgrove International School Thailand
- Harrow International School, Bangkok
- Mahidol Wittayanusorn School
- Mater Dei School
- Prem Tinsulanonda International School
- Regent's International School, Bangkok
- Vajiravudh College
- Wattana Wittaya Academy

=== Sri Lanka ===
- Ananda Sastralaya, Kotte
- Bandaranayake College, Gampaha
- Jaffna Central College
- Kingswood College, Kandy
- Panadura Royal College
- Royal Central College, Polonnaruwa
- Royal College, Colombo
- S. Thomas' College, Gurutalawa
- St. Aloysius College, Ratnapura
- St. Patrick's College, Jaffna
- Trinity College, Kandy
- Vembadi Girls High School

=== Taiwan ===
- I-Shou International School
- Sacred Heart Girls High School (Taiwan)

== Middle East ==
=== Bahrain ===
- Bahrain School

=== Iran ===
- Tehran Japanese School

=== Israel ===
- Alexander Muss High School in Israel
- Givat Haviva International School
- HaKfar HaYarok
- Israel Arts and Science Academy
- Israel Goldstein Youth Village
- Mikveh Israel

=== Jordan ===
- King's Academy

=== Palestine ===
- Talitha Kumi School

=== United Arab Emirates ===
- Repton School Dubai

== Oceania ==
=== New Zealand ===
==== North Island ====
- Auckland Grammar School, Auckland
- Auckland International College, Auckland
- Carncot Independent School, Palmerston North
- Dilworth School, Auckland
- Diocesan School for Girls, Auckland
- Epsom Girls' Grammar School, Auckland
- Feilding High School, Manawatu
- Hamilton Boys' High School, Hamilton
- Hamilton Girls' High School, Hamilton
- Hato Paora College, Feilding
- Hato Petera College, Auckland
- Hereworth School, Havelock North
- Hukarere Girls' College, Napier
- Iona College, Havelock North
- King's College, Auckland
- Lindisfarne College, New Zealand, Hastings
- Longburn Adventist College, Manawatu
- Mount Albert Grammar School, Auckland
- Napier Boys' High School, Napier
- Napier Girls' High School, Napier
- New Plymouth Boys' High School, Taranaki
- New Plymouth Girls' High School, Taranaki
- Nga Tawa Diocesan School, Marton
- Palmerston North Boys' High School, Palmerston North
- Rathkeale College, Masterton
- Sacred Heart College, Auckland
- St Cuthbert's College, Auckland
- St Kentigern College, Auckland
- St. Patrick's College, Silverstream, Upper Hutt
- St Paul's Collegiate School, Hamilton
- St Peter's School, Cambridge
- Scots College, Wellington
- Taranaki Diocesan School for Girls, Stratford
- Taumarunui High School, Taumarunui
- Te Aute College, Hawke's Bay
- Wairarapa College, Masterton
- Whanganui Collegiate School, Wanganui
- Wesley College, Auckland
- Whangarei Girls' High School, Whangarei

==== South Island ====
- Christchurch Boys' High School, Christchurch
- Christchurch Girls' High School, Christchurch
- Christ's College, Christchurch
- Columba College, Dunedin
- Dunstan High School, Alexandra
- Garin College, Nelson
- Gore High School, Gore
- John McGlashan College, Dunedin
- Medbury School, Christchurch
- Mount Aspiring College, Wānaka
- Nelson College, Nelson
- Nelson College for Girls, Nelson
- Otago Boys' High School, Dunedin
- Rangi Ruru Girls' School, Christchurch
- St Andrew's College, Christchurch
- St Bede's College, Christchurch
- St Hilda's Collegiate School, Dunedin
- St Kevin's College, Oamaru
- St Margaret's College, Christchurch
- St Peter's College, Gore
- Southland Boys' High School, Invercargill
- Southland Girls' High School, Invercargill
- Timaru Boys' High School, Timaru
- Timaru Girls' High School, Timaru
- Waitaki Boys' High School, Oamaru
- Waitaki Girls' High School, Oamaru

== Europe ==
=== Austria ===
- American International School, Salzburg
- Höhere Internatsschule des Bundes Wien (in German), Vienna
- St. Gilgen International School, St. Gilgen
- Theresianum, Vienna

=== Bosnia and Herzegovina ===
- United World College in Mostar

=== Czech Republic ===
- Carlsbad International School, Karlovy Vary
- Townshend International School, Hluboká nad Vltavou

=== Denmark ===
- Bagsværd Kostskole og Gymnasium
- Birkerød Gymnasium (in Danish), Birkerød
- Grenaa Gymnasium, Grenaa
- Herlufsholm School, Næstved
- Nyborg Gymnasium (in Danish), Nyborg
- Sorø Academy, Sorø
- Tokai University Boarding School in Denmark

=== France ===
- Chavagnes International College
- École des Roches (in French), Normandy
- École Saint Martin de France (in French), Pontoise
- Lycée Konan (closed)
- Lycée Lakanal
- Lycée privé Sainte-Geneviève
- Lycée Seijo (closed)
- Maison d'éducation de la Légion d'honneur
- Notre-Dame International High School

=== Germany ===
- Aloisiuskolleg
- Berlin Brandenburg International School
- CJD Christophorusschule Königswinter
- Collegium Augustinianum Gaesdonck (in German)
- Ettal Abbey
- Heimschule Kloster Wald (in German)
- Landheim Schondorf
- Pforta
- Robert Bosch United World College
- Schule Birklehof
- Schule Schloss Salem
- Schule Schloss Stein (in German)
- St. George's School, Cologne
- Stiftung Louisenlund
- Schloss Torgelow

=== Ireland ===
- Alexandra College, Dublin
- Bandon Grammar School, Cork
- Blackrock College, Dublin
- Cistercian College, Roscrea, County Tipperary
- Clongowes Wood College, County Kildare
- Dundalk Grammar School, County Louth
- Glenstal Abbey School, County Limerick
- Gormanston College, County Meath
- Kilkenny College, County Kilkenny
- The King's Hospital, Dublin
- Midleton College, County Cork
- Newtown School, Waterford
- Rockwell College, County Tipperary
- Saint Columba's College, Dublin
- Sligo Grammar School, County Sligo
- Sutton Park School, Dublin
- Villiers School, Limerick
- Wesley College, Dublin
- Wilson's Hospital School, Multyfarnham, County Westmeath
- Coláiste na Rinne
- Headfort School
- Newbridge College
- Rathdown School

=== Italy ===
- St. Stephen's School Rome
- Cicognini National Boarding School
- United World College of the Adriatic

=== Lithuania ===
- National M. K. Čiurlionis School of Art

=== Netherlands ===
- United World College Maastricht

=== Norway ===
- Kvitsund Gymnas, Telemark
- UWC Red Cross Nordic, Flekke, Fjaler
- Sagavoll Folk High School
- Vestborg Upper Secondary School

=== Portugal ===
- Colégio Militar
- Instituto de Odivelas
- Instituto dos Pupilos do Exército

=== Romania ===
- Costache Negruzzi National College, Iași

=== Slovakia ===
- Lutheran Gymnasium Tisovec

=== Spain ===
- Chester College International School
- International School of Barcelona

=== Russia ===
- Interdom
- Letovo School
- Moscow National Guard Presidential Cadets School
- Suvorov Military School

=== Sweden ===
- Lundsbergs boarding school
- Grennaskolan
- Mullsjö Secondary School
- Sigtunaskolan Humanistiska Läroverket

=== Switzerland ===
- Aiglon College
- American School in Switzerland (TASIS), Lugano
- Brillantmont International School, Lausanne
- Collège Alpin International Beau Soleil
- Collège du Léman
- Ecole d'Humanité, Bern
- Institut Alpin Videmanette
- Institut auf dem Rosenberg
- Institut Le Rosey
- Institut Monte Rosa
- Institut Montana (in Russian)
- Leysin American School
- Lyceum Alpinum Zuoz
- St George's School in Switzerland
- Collège Champittet
- Institut Villa Pierrefeu
- Saint-Charles International School
- Surval Montreux

=== Turkey ===
- American Collegiate Institute
- Darüşşafaka
- Galatasaray High School
- Istanbul High School
- Kabataş Erkek Lisesi
- Kadıköy Anadolu Lisesi
- Robert College

=== Ukraine ===
- Kyiv Lysenko State Music Lyceum
- School of Stolyarsky

== North America ==
=== Canada ===
==== Alberta ====
- Alberta School for the Deaf, Edmonton
- Saint John's School of Alberta, Stony Plain

==== British Columbia ====
- Bodwell High School, North Vancouver
- Brentwood College School, Mill Bay
- Island Oak High School, Vancouver Island
- Maxwell International School, Shawnigan Lake (closed in 2000)
- Pearson College UWC, Victoria
- Queen Margaret's School, Duncan
- St. George's School, Vancouver
- St. Margaret's School, Victoria
- St. Michaels University School, Victoria
- Shawnigan Lake School, Shawnigan Lake

==== Manitoba ====
- Balmoral Hall School, Winnipeg
- Mennonite Collegiate Institute, Gretna
- St. John's-Ravenscourt School, Winnipeg

==== New Brunswick ====
- Rothesay Netherwood School, Rothesay

==== Nova Scotia ====
- King's-Edgehill School, Windsor
- Kingston Bible College Academy, Kingston
- Landmark East School, Wolfville

==== Ontario ====
- Albert College, Belleville
- Appleby College, Oakville
- Ashbury College, Ottawa
- Bishop Strachan School, Toronto
- Branksome Hall, Toronto
- Columbia International College, Hamilton
- The Giles School, Toronto
- Havergal College, Toronto
- Lakefield College School, near Lakefield
- Pickering College, Newmarket
- Ridley College, St. Catharines
- Robert Land Academy, Wellandport
- Rosseau Lake College, Rosseau
- St. Andrew's College, Aurora
- Trafalgar Castle School, Whitby
- Trinity College School, Port Hope
- Upper Canada College, Toronto

==== Quebec ====
- Bishop's College School, Lennoxville
- Collège Bourget, Rigaud
- Sedbergh School, Quebec, Montebello
- Stanstead College, Stanstead

==== Saskatchewan ====
- Athol Murray College of Notre Dame, Wilcox
- Caronport High School, Caronport
- Luther College, Regina
- Rosthern Junior College, Rosthern
- Western Christian College, Regina

== Central America and the Caribbean ==
=== Jamaica ===
- Hampton School (Jamaica)
- Knox College High School
- Westwood High School (Jamaica)

=== Cuba ===
- Camilo Cienfuegos Military Schools System
- Ruston Academy

=== Costa Rica ===
- Costa Rica Country Day School, Guanacaste Province
- United World College of Costa Rica

== South America ==
=== Argentina ===
- St. George's College, Buenos Aires

=== Brazil ===
- Escola Sesc de Ensino Médio (in Portuguese)

=== Uruguay ===
- Liceo Militar General Artigas

=== Venezuela ===
- Christiansen Academy
