= Mount Mumpu =

Mountain in Zambia

- Mumpu Welume
- Location within Zambia

Highest point
- Elevation: 1,893 m (6,211 ft)
- Coordinates: 13°20′43″S 29°36′41″E

Geography
- Location: Central Province, Zambia

Mount Mumpu is the tallest free-standing mountain in Zambia at nearly 2,000 m (6,600 ft). It is regularly used by Chengelo Secondary School for expeditions run by the Ndubaluba Outdoor Centre. The Western ascent has a route through one of the largest bat caves in southern Africa.
