= Kwenda Mission =

Coordinates: 18°48′S 31°26′E

Information
- Established: 1892; 134 years ago

Kwenda Mission High School is an 'O' and 'A' Level boarding school in Mashonaland East Province in Zimbabwe.

The school is situated about 150 km south of the capital city Harare. Located in the Chikomba Area, Kwenda Mission High School offers "O" and "A" Level education for both girls and boys. The mission was opened in 1892 by Methodist (Wesley) Missionaries. Mr Chiwenga is the current headmaster and Rev Makwara is the current principal as well as chief administrator of the institution.

It is one of the 9 mission schools run by the Methodist Church in Zimbabwe. Its sister schools are Waddilove High School in Marondera, Chemhanza High School in Wedza, Tekwane Mission in Matebeleland, which was among the first mission stations opened by the missionaries in the 19th century, Sandringham High School in Norton, Pakame High School in Shurugwi, Moleli High School in Makwiro, Matthew Rusike College in Epworth and Bulawayo Methodist College in Bulawayo

Its notable alumni include Dr Sekai Nzenza the current Zimbabwe Ambassador to France, Spain and the Vatican, Aaron Chinhara of Glow petroleum, Perence Shiri, Dewa Mavhinga , Tendai Magwaza Dynamos football player, to mention just a few.

In ZIMSEC 2025 the school achieved 100% in A level with 31 students scoring 15 points while O Level had 98% with 3 failing out of 177 students who sat for the exams. The school has witnessed tremendous developments with the refurbishment of hostels, paving of the whole school, new school bus etc.
