= Mohd Omar Mustapha Ong =

Malaysian politician

Yang Berbahagia Datuk Mohd Omar Mustapha PJN
- محمد عمر مصطفى
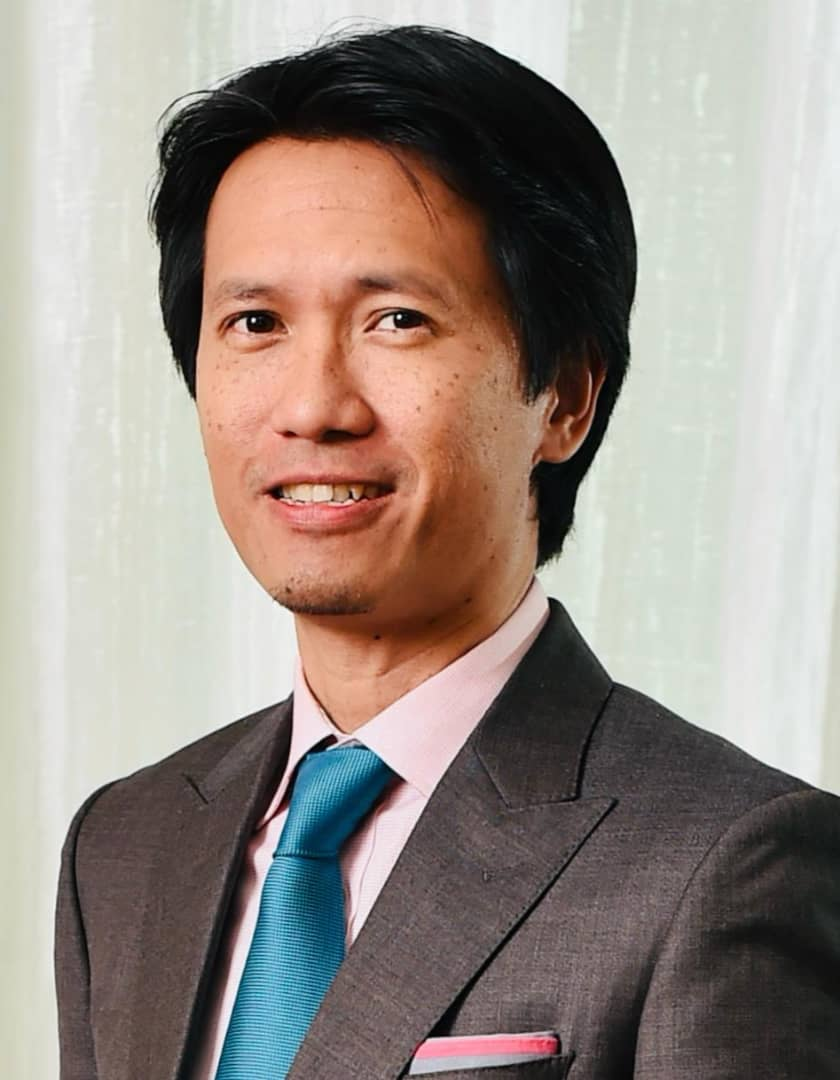
- Omar in 2025

Vice President of the National Vision Party
- Incumbent
- Assumed office 21 June 2026 Serving with: Abdul Rahim Thamby Chik; Wan Saiful Wan Jan; Leong Kim Soon; Huan Cheng Guan
- President: Hamzah Zainudin
- Preceded by: Office established

Assistant Chief of Staff to the Deputy Prime Minister of Malaysia
- In office 2004–2006
- Deputy Prime Minister of Malaysia: Najib Razak

Personal details
- Born: Mohd Omar bin Mustapha; 1971 (age 54–55)
- Party: National Vision Party (WAWASAN) (2026–kini)
- Other political affiliations: Perikatan Nasional (PN) (2026–)
- Spouse: Rozita Ramelan
- Children: 5
- Education: SMS Muar; Lady Margaret Hall, Oxford (BA, MA)
- Occupation: Corporate Figure; Management Consultant; Politician
- Mohd Omar Mustapha Ong on X

Mohd Omar bin Mustapha (Jawi: محمد عمر بن مصطفى; born 1971) is a Malaysian corporate figure and politician who is the founder of Ethos & Company and Ethos Capital. He also served as a special officer and assistant chief of staff to the deputy prime minister of Malaysia, Dato’ Sri Najib Razak, from 2004 to 2006. He is a founding member and the vice president of the National Vision Party (WAWASAN), a component party of the Perikatan Nasional (PN) coalition.

== Early life and education ==
The child of a Malaysian diplomat, Omar spent his childhood and teenage years in Asia (Ho Chi Minh City, Islamabad, Jakarta), Europe (Rome, Warsaw), and the Americas (Washington, D.C., Brasilia). He returned to Malaysia at the age of 13 and attended a boarding school in Muar, Johor. He was the top student in 1988 at Sekolah Menengah Sains Muar (SAMURA), where he eventually secured a Petronas Scholarship and completed his A-Levels at Rugby School in the UK. Omar then studied at the University of Oxford for his BA (Honours) and MA degrees in philosophy, politics, and economics (PPE) at Lady Margaret Hall, Oxford.

In 1994, he received the Tun Ismail Ali Award from the British-Malaysia Society. He also participated in the "Global Public Policy Leadership Program" at the Harvard Kennedy School of Government and completed the McKinsey Mini-MBA Program.

== Corporate career ==
Omar began his career at Petronas in 1994 as a corporate planning executive, later working in downstream operations in Cambodia and Vietnam. He also participated in joint venture negotiations with a Chinese state-owned enterprise for Petronas's initial downstream investment in China.

In 1997, he joined the Multimedia Development Corporation (MDeC) as chief of staff to the chairman and CEO. There, he managed technology startup acquisitions and intellectual property negotiations with US companies for the Multimedia Super Corridor (MSC) project.

He joined McKinsey & Company in 1999 as a senior associate, working in the firm's Kuala Lumpur, London, and Dubai offices. His consulting work focused on corporate strategy, national development planning, and post-merger integration across Southeast Asia, Western Europe, and the Gulf Cooperation Council (GCC).

He also founded Ethos Capital in 2008, a local private equity firm launched with an initial fund of $75 million USD—at the time, which was noted to be one of the largest private equity funds ever established by a local firm in Malaysia.

He previously served as an independent non-executive director of Symphony House Berhad, AirAsia, and Petroliam Nasional Berhad (PETRONAS). In addition, he chaired the Nomination and Remuneration Committees at Symphony House Berhad, AirAsia, and Petronas, overseeing board nomination processes, leadership succession planning, and organizational remuneration policies. He also served as Chairman of the Petronas Leadership Centre, Petronas's corporate leadership development institution responsible for training and developing the company's leadership talent.

In addition, he is a Fellow of the Institute of Corporate Directors Malaysia (ICDM), a professional recognition awarded to individuals who have demonstrated leadership and outstanding contributions in the fields of corporate governance and board development.

== Political career ==
=== Early years ===
He served as a member of the National Economic Council under Malaysia's fifth prime minister, Tun Abdullah Ahmad Badawi, from 2003 to 2005. He also served in the Malaysian government as a special officer and assistant chief of staff to the deputy prime minister, Dato’ Sri Najib Razak, from 2004 to 2006.

=== National Vision Party (WAWASAN) ===
After the formation of the National Vision Party (WAWASAN), Omar was unveiled as one of the five vice presidents in the party, supporting the 17th and 19th Leader of the Opposition, Hamzah Zainuddin. Omar is also concurrently the WAWASAN Division Chief of Langkawi.

== Controversies and issues ==
=== Fourth Floor Boys ===
In 2012, the late political blogger and founder of the Malaysia Today website, Raja Petra Kamarudin, had named Omar as one of the members of Khairy Jamaluddin's "Fourth Floor Boys," who were the controversial team that influenced national policymaking during Abdullah Ahmad Badawi's premiership.

=== Proxy for Najib Razak ===
On 21 June 2023, the High Court was informed that Dato’ Sri Najib Razak made payments totalling nearly RM23 million via 39 cheques to the company Semarak Konsortium Satu Sdn Bhd for international media services and speechwriting between 2011 and 2014. The company's director, Mohd Omar, received RM22,981,688 between 3 March 2011 and 23 April 2014 for the preparation of English-language speech texts, coordination with international media, and the production of articles for magazines and newspapers.

=== Bribery Scandal Against Anwar Ibrahim ===
In September 1998, Mustapha Ong approached Jamal Amro, a 39-year-old Palestinian-American who worked as a part-time driver for the Malaysian Embassy, and offered him $10,000–$15,000 USD to claim falsely that he had had a sexual relationship with Anwar Ibrahim.

The Malaysian judge refused to hear Amro's testimony, considering it irrelevant to the charges being tried. Amro also claimed that after refusing to make the false allegation, the Malaysian Embassy stopped hiring him to drive Malaysian dignitaries. In a later court testimony from the year 2000 proceedings, Ong reportedly told Jamal that he could receive up to $200,000 USD if he signed a false statement accusing Anwar of sexual misconduct, and that he can meet someone connected with Abdullah Ahmad Badawi's staff during the trip to New York to receive the money. He described the source of money as "Mr Clean", which was Abdullah Badawi's political nickname. In April 1999, 7 months prior to the 29 November 1999 elections, Anwar was convicted of corruption. Mustapha Ong himself later wrote an article in 2004 supporting a royal pardon for Anwar Ibrahim, one year after UMNO's candidate Abdullah Ahmad Badawi entered office as prime minister. He began his letter with affirming that he is still a strong supporter of the BN government, calls Badawi a close friend and political comrade, and claims that Badawi had consistently maintained Islamic values and political principles.

== Personal life ==
Omar is married to entrepreneur Dato’ Sri Rozita Ramelan and has five children. Omar now manages family office investments, dividing his time between Kuala Lumpur, Singapore, and Thailand.

== Awards and recognition ==
=== Awards in Malaysia ===
- Malaysia :
  - Commander of the Order of Meritorious Service (PJN) – Datuk (2011)

=== Recognition ===
- Young Global Leader by the World Economic Forum (2007)
- Eisenhower Fellow, United States (2008)
