= Oba Oladele Olashore =

- Ajagbusi-Ekun of Iloko-Ijesa
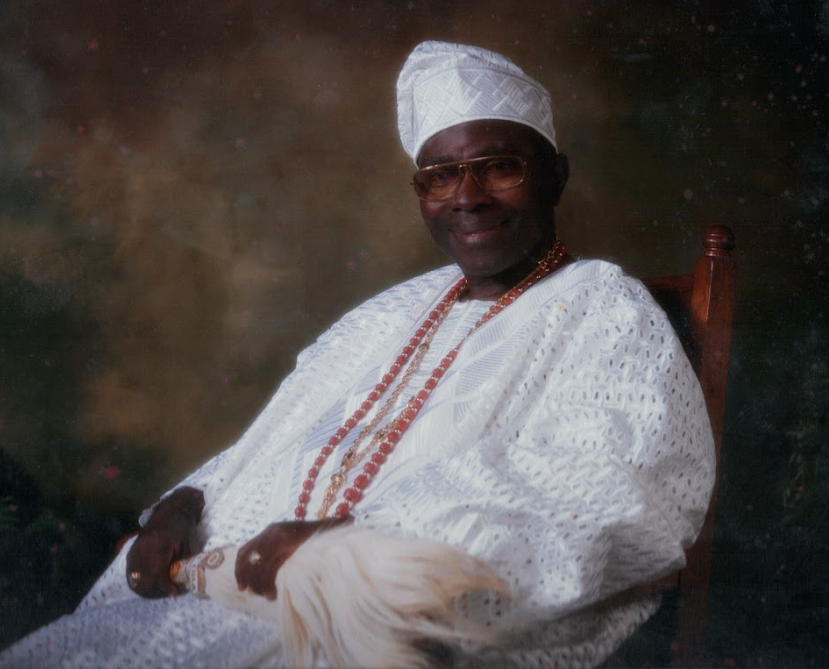
- Reign: 20th century – 2012
- Predecessor: Oba Samuel Oyerinde Olashore
- Born: February 17, 1935; Iloko-Ijesa, Nigeria
- Died: June 2, 2012 (aged 77); London, United Kingdom
- Occupation: Banker, traditional ruler, educator

Oba Oladele Olashore (February 17, 1935 – June 2, 2012) was a Nigerian banker, educator, philanthropist, and traditional ruler. He served as the 19th Ajagbusi-Ekun of Iloko-Ijesa, a town in Osun State, Nigeria. Olashore was a former managing director of First Bank of Nigeria and the founder of Lead Merchant Bank. He also established the Olashore International School, a private secondary school designed to provide quality education in rural Nigeria. He was a recipient of the national honour of Commander of the Order of the Niger (CON).

== Banking career ==
Oba Olashore began his professional career at the UAC before transitioning into banking. He rose through the ranks to become the managing director of First Bank of Nigeria, where he played a role in modernizing Nigeria's banking operations. Later, he founded Lead Merchant Bank and served as its chairman. Following the bank's eventual closure, the Nigeria Deposit Insurance Corporation (NDIC) secured a court judgment to reimburse affected depositors.

== Reign as traditional ruler ==
Following the death of his father, Oba Olashore ascended the throne as the 19th Ajagbusi-Ekun of Iloko-Ijesa. His reign focused on infrastructural and educational development. In 1992, he established the Olashore International School, which follows international education standards and serves students from across Nigeria.

== Philanthropy and legacy ==
In addition to the school, Oba Olashore founded the Oladele Olashore International Foundation (OISA Foundation), aimed at supporting educational and welfare initiatives for underprivileged children in Nigeria.

He was honored with the national award of Commander of the Order of the Niger (CON) in recognition of his contributions to banking, education, and community development.

== Death ==
Oba Olashore died on June 2, 2012, at the age of 77. His passing was widely reported and marked with national tributes.

== See also ==
- List of Nigerian traditional rulers
- Education in Nigeria
- First Bank of Nigeria
