= Island oak (disambiguation) =

Island oak is a common name of Quercus tomentella, an oak in the section Protobalanus.

Island oak may also refer to:

- Island Oak High School, a school on Vancouver Island, in British Columbia
- Quercus cedrosensis, also known as Cedros Island oak, a species of plant in the family Fagaceae
- Quercus parvula, also known as Santa Cruz Island oak, an evergreen red oak

== See also ==
- Oak Island (disambiguation)
