= Armenia–China relations =

- Armenia: China

Diplomatic mission
- Embassy of Armenia, Beijing: Embassy of China, Yerevan

Envoy
- Armenian Ambassador to China Vahe Gevorgyan: Chinese Ambassador to Armenia Li Xinwei

The first references to Armenian-Chinese contact are found in the works of 5th-century historian Moses of Chorene and 6th-century geographer and mathematician Anania Shirakatsi. Following the dissolution of the Soviet Union, the People's Republic of China officially recognized Armenia on December 27, 1991. Diplomatic relations between Armenia and the People's Republic of China were established on April 6, 1992. The Embassy of China to Armenia was established in July 1992, while the Embassy of Armenia to China started its activities on August 10, 1996. The Armenian Ambassador to China resides in the Beijing embassy.

Presidents of Armenia Levon Ter-Petrosyan and Robert Kocharyan visited the P.R. of China in May 1996 and September 2004. President Serzh Sargsyan was in China in May 2010 to participate in the opening ceremony of the "Shanghai World Expo 2010". High-level visits from China to Armenia included members of the Politburo Standing Committee of the Chinese Communist Party Luo Gan, in September 2003, and Li Changchun, in April 2011.

== History ==
The first relations between the Armenian and Chinese people can be traced back to around AD 1000. In Chinese, "Armenia" is pronounced "Ya-mei-ni-ya" (Chinese: 亚美尼亚; pinyin: Yàměiníyà). These four characters literally mean "the beautiful maid of Asia." In Armenian legends and fairy tales, China is called the country of Chenes, Chinumachin, or Chinastan. Some ancient Armenian literary works have traces of Chinese cultural icons. For example, there are qilin, fenghuang (Chinese phoenix), and dharmachakra designs in the Armenian Bible.

Armenians visited China for trade and imported silk, porcelain, jade, embroidered fabrics, and other goods to bring back to Armenia via the Silk Road. In China, there was high demand for Armenian medicinal products, vegetables, mineral paints, and insects, especially the Armenian cochineal (Porphyrophora hamelii), which was used to dye the finest Chinese silk and Indian silk fabrics.

The Chinese porcelains and celadonite that were discovered during archeological excavations of the Armenian cities of Garni, Dvin, Ani, and the Amberd fortress are evidence of early-medieval Armenian-Chinese economic trade.

Movses Khorenatsi, Anania Shirakatsi, Stepanos Orbelian, and King Hethum I of Armenia wrote about China, Chinese culture, and the Chinese people.

During the time of the Mongol Empire, the relations between Armenia and China were furthered. Many Armenians began to settle in China. In 1688 the British East India Company agreed to permit Armenians access to Chinese maritime trade. The Armenians made full usage of this agreement with the British established maritime trade hubs in Shanghai and Macao.

On 27 December 1991, China officially recognized Armenia as an independent state. On April 6, 1992, many Central Asian countries established diplomatic relations with China. In July 1992, China established an embassy in the Armenian Capital of Yerevan. In 1996, Armenia established their embassy in Beijing.

== Trade and economic relations ==
=== Trade turnover (mln. US dollars) ===
Year	Export	Import (origin)	Import (consignment)
2012	31.2	399.7	208.1
2011	16.2	404.2	209.1
2010	30.8	404.2	223.3
2009	17.8	284.6	130.6
2008	18.1	382.1	169.3
2007	7.8	194.7	84.0
2006	0.4	111.0	52.5
2005	9.2	65.5	27.1
2004	21.7	38.4	13.3
2003	4.5	31.4	8.6
2002	4.0	-	10.1
2001	0.0	-	7.8
2000	0.5	-	5.4
1999	0.0	-	4.8

The data in the chart above shows that the trade volume between Armenia and China, although still relatively small, has grown significantly over the last decade and exceeded US$400 million by 2008. There was a significant slump in trade volume in 2009, probably due to the Great Recession. Trade volume increased, exceeding US$400 million for two consecutive years in 2010 and 2011.

Armenia's main export is ore, while the products imported from China to Armenia are diverse and include clothes, shoes, machinery, chemicals, equipment, construction materials, furniture, food etc.

Armenia joined the Belt and Road Initiative in 2015.

=== Industry ===
In May 2010, Shanna (Shanxi-Nairit) Synthetic Rubber Co., jointly funded by Shanxi Synthetic Rubber Group and Armenia's Nairit LLC, was established and started production. Armenia's president attended the inauguration of the Shanxi-Nairit joint venture, marking the commencement of the company's chloroprene rubber production in Datong. Shanxi-Nairit joint venture was created based on an agreement signed in 2003 by the Shanxi Synthetic Rubber Company (China) and Nairit LLC (RA). Nairit LLC holds 40 percent of Shanxi-Nairit's shares.

China and Armenia have signed some bilateral cooperation agreements related to agriculture and scientific research, including the "Xinjiang-Armenia Top-quality Fruit Tree Planting Technical Cooperation", the "Central Asian Sci-Tech Exchange and Cooperation on Grapes", and the "Study on Vinyl Acetate and Its Byproducts".

== Education and culture ==
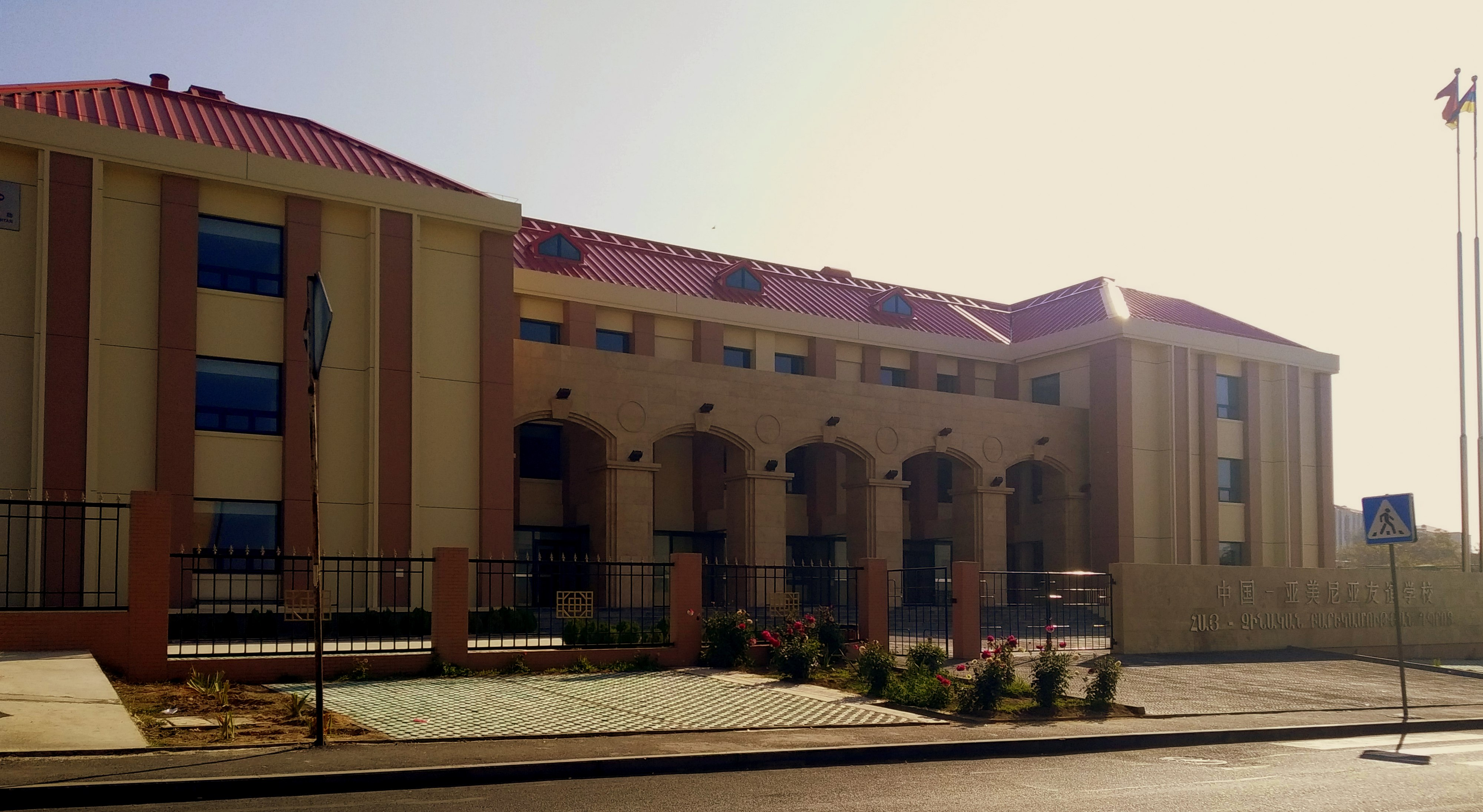
Chinese-Armenian Friendship School in Yerevan

The Chinese and Armenian governments have agreed to send 15 exchange students to study in each other's country each year. However, the two countries have not yet signed an agreement ensuring that the exchange students can receive credit for their work complete abroad. As of 2007, there are were no direct flights between Armenia and China.

Every year, China celebrates Armenian Cultural Day and Armenia celebrates Chinese Cultural Day. Armenians are very interested in Chinese culture and enjoy a variety of Chinese theatrical performances.

Confucius Institute opened at Yerevan State Linguistic University in 2008. Another Confucius Institute opened elsewhere in Armenia. Additionally, in 2018, the Chinese-Armenian Friendship School opened in Yerevan.

== Military ==
Armenia has established diplomatic relations and military-technical collaborations with China. This includes the importation of Chinese-made weapons and the training of Armenian officers at Chinese military academies. Additionally, China provides 10 million yuan annually in military assistance for non-lethal activities aimed at enhancing security around the infrastructure of the Silk Road Economic Belt (SREB).

According to Chang Wanquan, Minister of the PRC's Ministry of Defense, the Chinese and Armenian militaries have maintained the trend of conducting friendly exchanges and pragmatic cooperation, and the Chinese military has promoted the steady development of the relations between the two armed forces. According to Seyran Ohanyan, former Defense Minister of Armenia, Armenia regards China as a reliable friend and partner. He expressed satisfaction with the development of the bilateral military relations seen in recent years and he expressed his hopes to promote cooperation between the two militaries in a variety of areas. On 18 January 2012, China and Armenia signed a Military Cooperation Agreement between the two countries. In 2013, Ohanyan held talks with Xu Qiang, Vice Chairman of the Central Military Commission, and Chang Wanquan, Minister of the PRC's Ministry of Defense.

Armenian defense ministers regularly participate in the Beijing Xiangshan Forums to discuss military-technical cooperation with China. For example, in October 2023, the current Minister of Defence met with Colonel General He Weidong, a member of the Politburo and Vice Chairman of the Central Military Commission of the People's Republic of China. According to Armenia's Ministry of Defence, the two officials discussed potential future collaboration.

== Armenian genocide ==
At present, China has not recognized the Armenian genocide. During the Armenian genocide, China hosted a small number of Armenian refugees, mostly concentrated around Harbin and Tianjin, prompting expressions of gratitude from the survivors. In 2011, Chinese Foreign Minister Yang Jiechi laid flowers on the Armenian Genocide memorial in Yerevan. In 2015, the Armenian community of China organized an important series of cultural and artistic events in Nanjing to commemorate the centennial of the Armenian genocide. The aim was to share Armenian history, art, and culture with the Chinese people during this significant occasion.

== Resident diplomatic missions ==
- Armenia has an embassy in Beijing.
- China has an embassy in Yerevan.
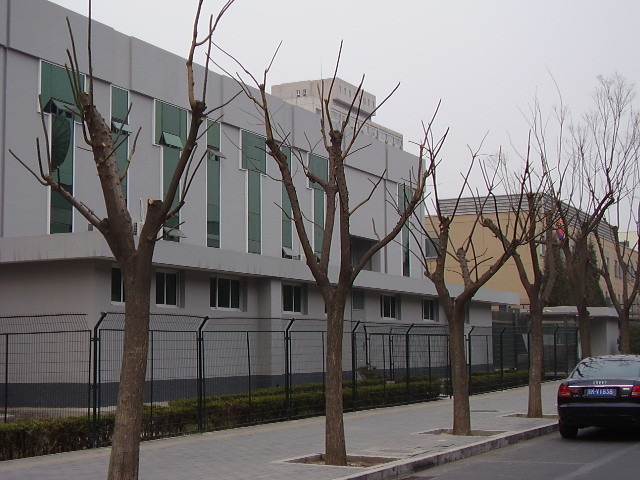
Embassy of Armenia in Beijing

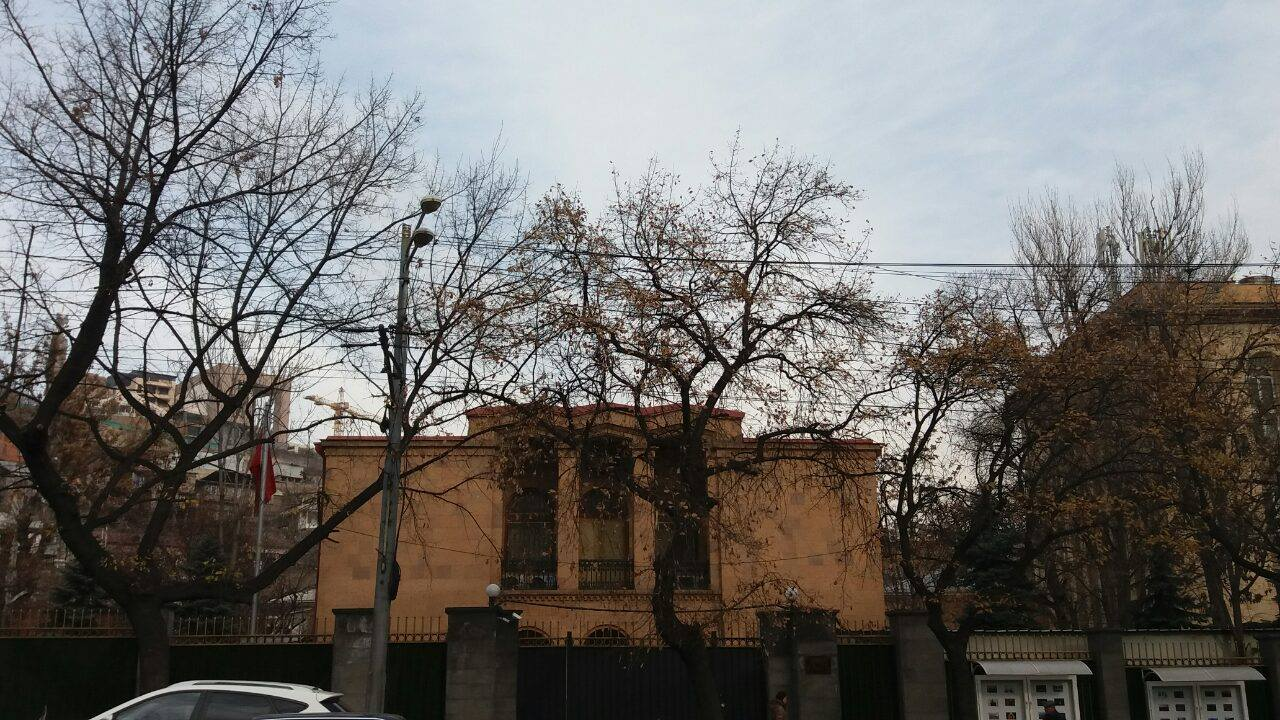
Embassy of China in Yerevan

== See also ==
- Armenians in China
- Foreign relations of Armenia
- Foreign relations of China
