= List of ambassadors of Armenia to China =

Ambassador of Extraordinary and Plenipotentiary of Armenia to the People's Republic of China
- Residence: Beijing
- Nominator: Vahagn Khachaturyan
- Website: Armenian Embassy - Beijing

The Armenian Ambassador to China (Armenian: Հայաստանի Հանրապետության դեսպան Չինական Ժողովրդավարական Հանրապետությունում) is the head of the diplomatic mission of Armenia in the People's Republic of China.

== Background ==
Armenian-Chinese official talks started, when the People's Republic of China officially recognized Armenia on 27 December 1991. Diplomatic relations between Armenia and the People's Republic of China were established on 6 April 1992.

The Armenian embassy was opened in Beijing on 10 October 1996.

== List of Envoys to the Republic of China ==
Name	Appointed	Terminated
Azat Martirosian*	1996	1997
Azat Martirosian	1997	2001
Vasili Kazaryan	2001	2007
Vahagn Movsisyan	2007	2008
Armen Sargsyan	2008	2016
Sergey Manassarian	2016	2022
Vahe Gevorgyan	2024	current

- Charge d’Affairs of Armenia

The Armenian Embassy in China is also accredited to Singapore, Vietnam and South Korea.

== See also ==
- Foreign relations of Armenia
