= St. Mary's Minor Seminary, Chipata =

Catholic school in Zambia

Information
- School type: Secondary boarding school
- Motto: Ora et labora (Pray and work)
- Religious affiliation: Catholicism
- Established: 1980; 45 years ago
- School board: Roman Catholic Diocese of Chipata
- Teaching staff: 11
- Gender: Boys
- Age: 12+
- Enrollment: 155 (2021)

St. Mary's Minor Seminary is a Catholic senior secondary boarding school in Zambia, run by the Roman Catholic Diocese of Chipata for males aged 12 years and older. The minor seminary is 600 kilometres (370 miles) from Lusaka and is situated 20 kilometres (12 miles) from the Chipata-Chadiza Road.

== History and operations ==
The school is sometimes called new St. Mary's because it is the second seminary after the sale of the St. Mary's which was situated along Malawi Road. The new seminary was opened in 1980 by late Cardinal Medardo Joseph Mazombwe, then-Bishop of the Chipata Diocese, with the sole aim of raising up young men that would proceed to the Major seminary to pursue diocesan priesthood.

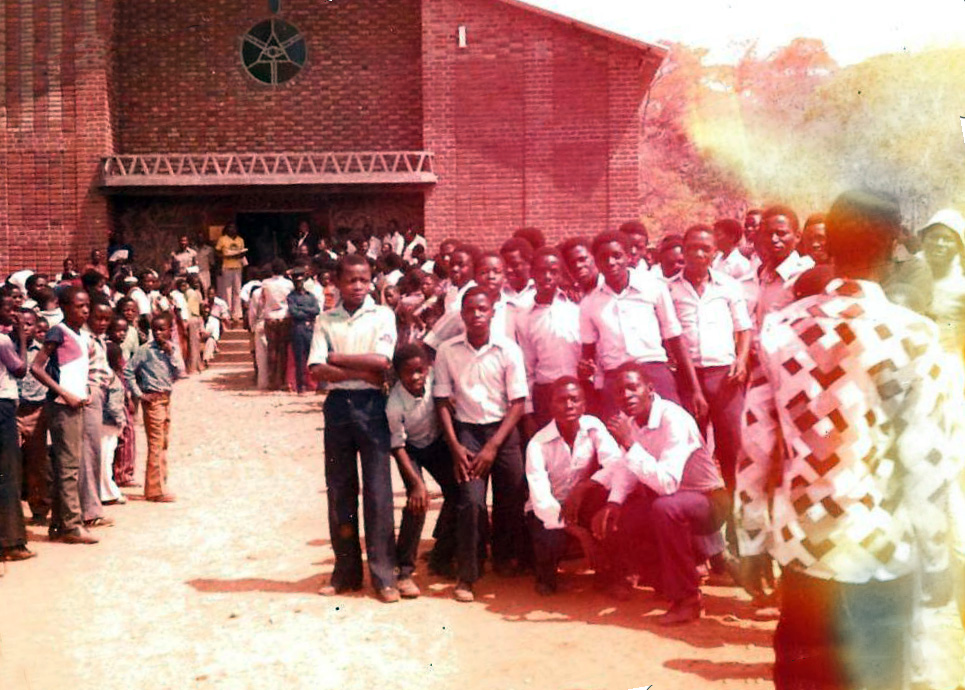
A group of seminarians in front of the chapel, October 4, 1981.

In 2021, the school had 155 pupils and 11 teachers, with a 100% pass rate at Year 12.

== Symbols ==
- The chapel symbolises the centrality of prayer and all spiritual activities of the seminary.
- The hoe symbolises the hard work that the boys should cultivate.
- The chalice and the Eucharist: celebration of Mass that should be the centre of life of every seminarian and a reminder that he is called to be a priest to offer mass for the people.
- Motto: Ora et Labora ("Pray and Work")

== See also ==
- Education in Zambia
- List of boarding schools
- List of Roman Catholic seminaries
- List of schools in Zambia
- Roman Catholicism in Zambia
