= Oak Island (disambiguation) =

Oak Island is an island located in Lunenburg County, Nova Scotia. It is known for the Oak Island mystery—claims of buried treasure and unexplained objects being found on the island.

Oak Island may also refer to:

== Places ==
Listed alphabetically by province or state

=== Canada ===
- Oak Island (Manitoba), a settlement in the Rural Municipality of Taché
- Oak Island (Nova Scotia), the original location of New Minas, Nova Scotia

=== United States ===
- Oak Island (Minnesota), an island and unincorporated community in Lake of the Woods County
- Oak Island (New York), an island in the St. Lawrence River in Hammond, New York
- Oak Island, New York, a hamlet of the town of Babylon, New York
- Oak Island (North Carolina), a barrier island in Brunswick County
  - Oak Island, North Carolina, a town on the island
- Oak Island (Oregon), alternate name of Hog Island (Oregon), an island in the Willamette River in Clackamas County
- Oak Island (South Carolina), a historic plantation house in Charleston County
- Oak Island (Texas), an unincorporated community in Chambers County
- Oak Island (Washington), an island in Washington state now known as Reach Island
- Oak Island (Wisconsin), an island in Lake Superior

== Other uses ==
- Oak Island (EP), an album by the American band Our Last Night
- Oak Island Golf Club, a golf club located at Caswell Beach, North Carolina
- Oak Island Life Saving Station, a historic life saving station at Caswell Beach, North Carolina
- Oak Island Light, a lighthouse on Caswell Beach, North Carolina
- Oak Island Yard, a rail facility in Newark, New Jersey
- The Curse of Oak Island, a History channel television series

== See also ==
- Ekerö, an urban area in Sweden that translates to Oak Island
- Island oak (disambiguation)
