= Saint-Charles International School =

Location
- Porrentruy, Ajoie; Switzerland
- Coordinates: 47.4205°N 7.0752°E

Information
- Type: Private International Boarding School
- Motto: Supporting Growth
- Religious affiliation: Christianity
- Established: 1897
- Founder: Ernest Daucourt
- Authority: République et Canton du Jura. Confédération Suisse
- Principal: Carmen Kocher
- Website: www.saint-charles.ch

Saint-Charles International School is an international private boarding school located in Porrentruy, Ajoie, in the Swiss Canton of Jura.

== History ==
Founded in 1897 by Ernest Daucourt, Saint-Charles International School has a history of over 125 years. Initially, the school served as a boarding institution, providing academic support to young Catholics from the Jura region.

In 1915, the Catholic Institute became the Saint-Charles Institute, on the initiative of Abbot Charles Humair, who served as its new rector as at then. In 1925, the Institute became the Collège Saint-Charles and expanded its facilities to accommodate more pupils.

In 2020, Saint-Charles became an IB World School and was authorized to teach the IB (International Baccalaureate) Diploma Programme. In 2022, the institute was authorized to deliver the IB Middle Years Programme.

== Academic program ==
The school offers primary, middle school, and secondary school programs. The International Section of the school includes the International Baccalaureate (IB) Diploma Programme and Middle Years Program (MYP).

Lycée Saint-Charles, recognized by the Swiss Confederation, allows students to undertake the Matura exams. Since 2016, the institute has offered a bilingual French-English Matura exam. Students may take preparatory courses in order to obtain internationally recognized diplomas such as the Goethe Zertifikat and TestDaF (German), First Certificate (English) and CELI (Italian).

== Associations ==
Saint-Charles International School Switzerland is a member of following associations:

- Catholic Schools of Switzerland
- Federation of Swiss Private Schools
- Premium Switzerland
- Boarding Schools Association
- World Schools
- International Baccalaureate
