= Bishop Mackenzie International School =

Location
- Barron Avenue, Lilongwe; Malawi
- Coordinates: 14.005°S 33.760°E

Information
- Type: Private for-profit
- Established: 1944 (81 years ago)
- Director: Adrian Moody
- Principal: Lisa Hughes (primary); Yasmin Henn(secondary)
- Education system: International Baccalaureate: Primary Years Programme (PYP), Middle Years Programme (MYP), Diploma Programme (DP)
- Nickname: BMIS
- Accreditation: Council of International Schools (CIS) and New England Association of Schools and Colleges (NEASC)
- Publication: Chikumbutso (yearbook),
- Website: bmis.mw

Bishop Mackenzie International School (BMIS) is an English-medium private, nonprofit coeducational day school based in Lilongwe, Malawi.

Founded in 1944, it provides an education to approximately 693 students in the primary and secondary schools from Reception to Year 13 (4–18 years old, grades K–12). BMIS is an IB World School offering the International Baccalaureate® (IB) Primary Years (PYP), IB Middle Years (MYP) and IB Diploma (DP) Programmes. Additionally, BMIS is a fully accredited member of the Council of International Schools (CIS) and the New England Association of Schools and Colleges (NEASC).

== History ==
The school was named in memory of Charles Mackenzie, a prominent figure in the early history of Malawi. He joined David Livingstone on the Zambezi in 1861 as Bishop of Central Africa and Head of the Anglican Universities Mission. Mackenzie died of malaria and the mission collapsed almost before it began; yet he helped create a vanguard for the abolition of the slave trade by means of Livingstone's much heralded "Commerce and Christianity".

BMIS was founded in 1944 as The Lilongwe European School. Originally there were no more than a dozen pupils.

In 1998, the school separated from the Designated Schools Board and established itself as a trust under Malawi law. All parents are members of the parents' association, which constitutes the membership of the board of trustees. BMIS became an International Baccalaureate Diploma Programme-authorized school in 1997. The school expanded the IB programmes in 2006 introducing the Primary Years Programme (PYP), which was authorized in 2011. BMIS was fully authorized in 2013 to offer the IB Middle Years Programme (MYP) for secondary students in Years 7 - 11.

== Academic curriculum ==
The school offers an education with the principal language of instruction being English. The school also offers specialist teachers for students for whom English is not their first language and need support in developing language acquisition to enable them to succeed in the classroom. Specialist teachers are also available for students who have special needs.

The International Baccalaureate® (IB) Primary Years Programme (PYP) is for students aged 3–11. PYP has an emphasis on the holistic growth of the child during his/her developmental years. The program seeks to create an engaging and challenging educational framework for children. Five essential elements that are part of this curriculum are concepts, knowledge, skills, attitudes and action.

The International Baccalaureate® (IB) Middle Years Programme (MYP): This program is for students between the ages of 11 and 16 years. Being a critical phase in most students' lives, this age requires a program which can help students to develop the knowledge and skills that are essential during the challenging times. The program focuses on five areas of interaction that are approaches to Learning, community and service, human ingenuity, environment and health and social education.

The International Baccalaureate® (IB) Diploma Programme: This program is aimed for students between the ages 16 and 19. The program includes six subjects with three core parts: 1) creativity, activity and service; 2) extended essay; and 3) theory of knowledge.

== After-school activities ==
The school offers a wide range of intellectual, cultural, sporting and service activities aimed at providing the students with an experience beyond their academic development. These are offered through the after-school activities programme, inter-house and interschool sports competitions, student council activities, and a community service programme.

After school activities are run in two sessions in the afternoons; from 2pm to 3pm and then 3pm to 4pm. Swimming is a very popular activity, since the weather in the first and second terms allows for maximum use of the outside swimming pools. Football, basketball, rugby, and hockey are also popular sports, but the school also arranges tennis, karate, table tennis, ballet, chess, photo-club and a wide range of other activities to suit all interests and abilities. BMIS regularly competes with other schools in Lilongwe and further afield (often a 4–5 hour bus ride away) as well as international tournaments.

In the Primary School, children take part in curriculum activities as well as after school programmes where they participate in fundraising and events with local charities, orphanages and community projects. The local Ndi Moyo, Operation Smile and Tilinanu orphanage are a few projects that the children are currently actively working on. Recently, children have also been involved in briquette making and recycling projects. They also frequently collaborate with less fortunate children in Lilongwe schools. Progressively through the school, students' involvements take on different perspectives as they mature and are able to not only participate, but actively organize events and activities. Community and service elements are built into the Middle Years and Diploma programmes.

== Facilities ==
The school's campus is located on the southwestern edge of Lilongwe's Area 3, a settled area of suburban housing. The campus occupies ten hectares (approximately twenty-five acres) of land with established shade trees and evergreen gardens, two sports fields, two basketball courts, and a swimming pool complex comprising an 18-meter pool, 25-meter pool, and an infant splash pool.

The BMIS Primary School has 21 teacher-based classrooms and specialized rooms for art, music, reading/ICT and educational support. In the Secondary School, facilities include 21 specialist teacher classrooms, four science laboratories plus a dedicated data-logging lab, and three Technology rooms. Art and music have specialist rooms and a new drama studio is under construction.

The school library has over 22,000 literary and reference works, with three distinct sections for secondary and primary students. An assembly hall with a stage is also used as a theatre and further doubles as a sports hall for badminton, volleyball and gymnastics.

The school employs a full-time nurse who is available during the school day. The clinic has three beds that may be used while waiting for a parent to collect a sick child. Medication may be left with the nurse to administer to children if required. The US Embassy Medical Centre regularly runs first aid training with teachers and staff at the school. The embassy also provided a portable defibrillator unit for emergency standby.

== Technology ==
The school has a fiber-optic network and campus-wide wireless coverage that facilitates connectivity for over 200 computers. The school also provides over 100 iPads for classroom research and encourages students to bring the own devices to connect to the network and Internet. In 2014, security CCTV cameras were introduced into the key thoroughfares and gates around the school and a central PA system was installed.

== New constructions ==
The school has recently completed building a new hall as well as a new block of changing rooms.

== School magazines ==
Chikumbutso, Tikambe and Mawa are the official school publications. Both students and staff contribute the content of these three magazines.

- Mawa is published on a weekly basis and provides the parent community with a summary of the forthcoming events.
- Tikambe is published monthly and features news and articles about the events and activities that have taken place in the school.
- Chikumbutso is the school yearbook, which is published at the end of each academic year.

== See also ==
- Education in Malawi
- List of international schools
