= Mansehra International Public School and College =

Mansehra International Public School and College (MIPS), is a private high school in Mansehra, Pakistan. It was founded in 1995 by Engr Sher Afzal Khan Swati. The school is situated, about 3400 feet above sea level, close to the Abbottabad Road in the middle of the Government Food Godown. The area where the school is situated was devastated by the 2005 Kashmir earthquake on 8 October 2005.

== Administration ==
The school is administrated by Sher Afzal Khan Swati and Faisal Khan Swati. It is divided into sections for boys and girls. Both the school and the college provide boarding. There are over 750 students studying in the school and 400 in the college. Of these, 45 children receive full financial support from the institution. The faculty consists of 50 staff.

The institution is self-governing under a board of governors. The Government Allotted Registration No is 1279 as a Permanent Recognized Education Department.

== Academic aspects ==
The teaching medium is English and emphasis is laid on both the national language and English which are compulsory subjects throughout the course. The school and college prepare students for the Mansehra educational board examinations, as well as the F.Sc Intermediate and Matriculation examinations.

== Award ceremonies ==
Political leaders are the guest of honour at the school's annual prize giving.

- 2003 - Leader of the opposition in the Khyber-Pakhtunkhwa Assembly Shahzada Gustasap Khan who said that there is no room for extremism and intolerance in Islam.
- 2004 - Khyber-Pakhtunkhwa Minister for Law and Parliamentary Affairs, Muhammad Ayaz Khan who said that the provincial government was determined to extend all facilities for the promotion of education and the enhancement of literacy rate which was much below the international standard.

== Facilities ==
The school estate covers an area of 35 kanals. There are facilities for sport and extracurricular activities.
