= Mount Everest Boarding School =

Address
- Lekhnath, Pokhara-27; Pokhara, Gandaki; Nepal

Information
- Type: Private
- Motto: Education for Humanity
- Established: 1985 A.D./2042 B.S.
- School district: Kaski
- Principal: Yukta Narayan Aryal
- Houses: Sagarmatha, Annapurna, Machhapuchhre, Dhawalagiri
- Color(s): Blue, red, yellow and green
- Publication: Aarohan (Annual school magazine)
- Affiliations: PABSON
- Information: +977-061-562010,

Mount Everest Boarding School is one of the oldest private schools in Pokhara, Nepal.

== History ==
In 1985, Dr. Vijay Raj Sharma, a prominent lecturer from Tribhuvan University, conceived the idea of a school to meet the education needs of the growing community in Pokhara. The school was established on 3rd Poush, 2042 (18 December 1985) by Dr. Vijay Raj Sharma. Regional educational director Anand Lal Pradhan was the chief guest at that programme.

In the year 2054 B.S., the students took the S.L.C. exams for the first time. All the students achieved 1st Division results.

The school is home to over 200 students.

The school motto is "Committed to Academic and Extracurricular Excellence".

== Location ==
The school in situated in New Road, Pokhara. The Annapurna mountain range forms the scenic backdrop to the school.
