= Vestborg Upper Secondary School =

Location
- Hevsdalsvegen 11, 6200 Stranda; Stranda; Norway

Information
- Type: Private School
- Motto: Vi oppdager saman (We discover together)
- Established: 1949
- Principal: Geir Magne Engås
- Enrollment: 91 (2016/17)
- Website: www.vestborg.no

Vestborg Upper Secondary School (Norwegian: Vestborg Vidaregående Skole) is a Christian boarding school in the village of Stranda which is located within Stranda Municipality in Møre og Romsdal county, Norway. The school is owned by the Norwegian Lutheran Mission. It offers general studies as well as supplementary studies qualifying for higher education for students who have previously attended vocational studies. The school accepts students from all over the country.

== History ==
The school established on 9 January 1949 as a mercantile school named Storfjord handelsskole. Later it changed names to Vestborg handelsskole in 1954. It was not until 1981 that the school became an upper secondary school, with its current name.

== Headmasters ==
- Knut Vikenes (1949-1962)
- Gunnar Skotte (1962-1986)
- Bernhard Belt (1986-1993)
- Svein Roar Grønbeck (1993-1998)
- Lars Birger Stige (1998-2005)
- Odd Rannestad (2005-2008)
- Geir Magne Engås (2008–present)
