= Chester College International School =

Location
- Travesia de Montouto, 2 Teo; Santiago de Compostela, Galicia, 15894; Spain
- Coordinates: 42.839257°N 8.544873°W

Information
- Other name: CCIS
- Type: Private, American day and boarding international school
- Established: 1985
- Grades: PK–12
- Gender: Co-educational
- Age range: 3–18
- Accreditations: COGNIA and Ministry of Education (Spain)
- Affiliation: Mediterranean Association of International Schools (MAIS)
- Website: www.chestercollege.org

Chester College International School (CCIS) is a full-accredited international American-Spanish day and boarding school founded in 1985 by Juan Pías and Dolores Peleteiro, for students from Early Learning (age 3) up to grade 12 (age 18), located in the outskirts of Santiago de Compostela, Spain.

It is accredited by the US accreditation agency Cognia and the Spanish Ministry of Education.

Chester College International School offers an integrated American-Spanish curriculum. The school's languages of instruction are English and Spanish. The school can cater for students with no Spanish initially.

Students in CCIS who fulfil all requirements obtain both an American "High School Diploma" and a Spanish "Título de Bachiller".

Chester College International School is a member of the Mediterranean Association of International Schools (MAIS) and both a Trinity College London and a College Board SAT and AP examination centre.

CCIS organises English and Spanish language immersion summer camps in the month of July, since 1985. These Camps have a special focus on sports, Music and performing arts.

It also organises short language stays for individuals and school groups during the school year.
