= Chengelo Secondary School =

Chengelo School
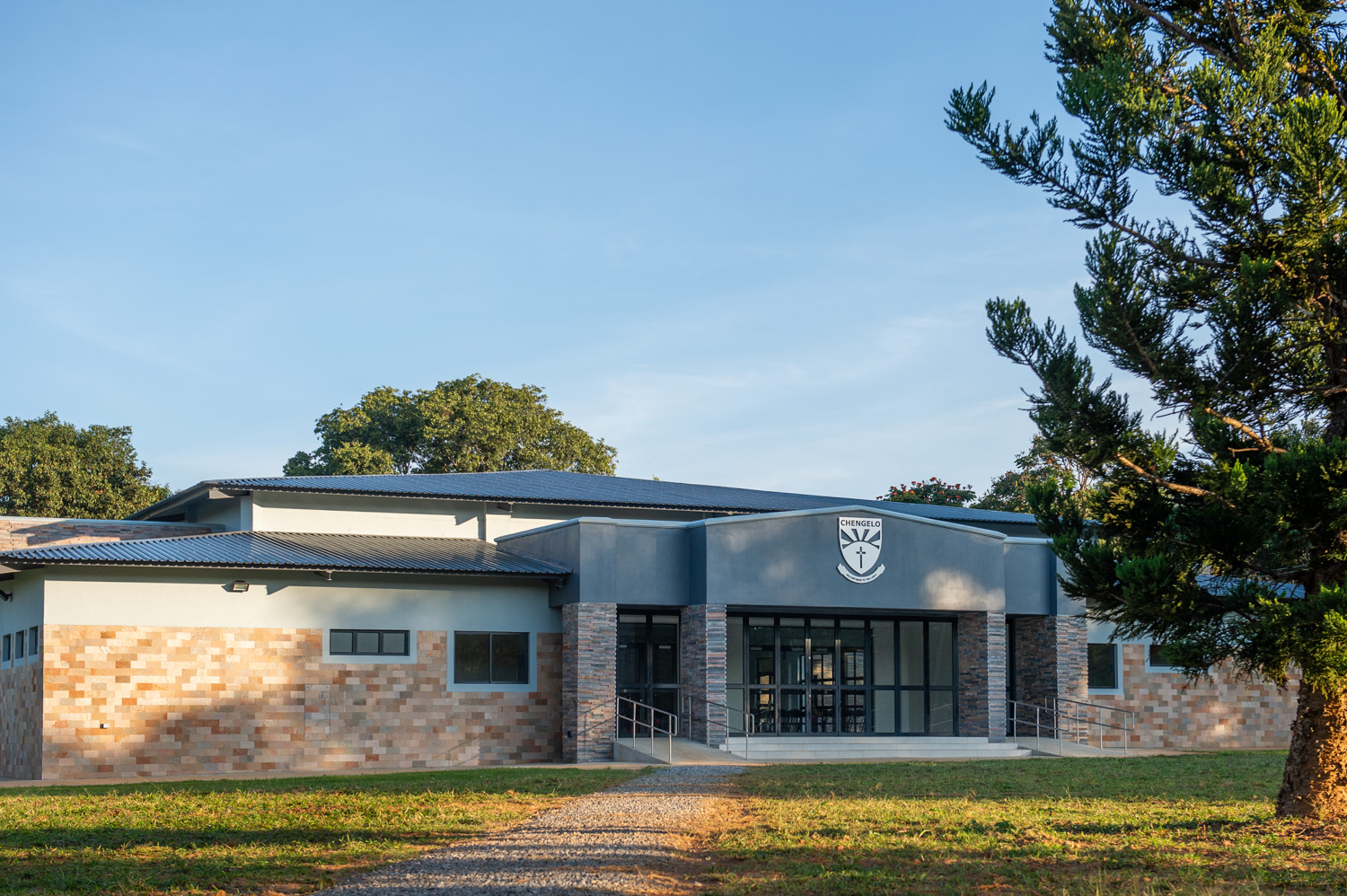
- School Hall
- Mkushi; Zambia

Information
- Type: Independent School
- Motto: As a witness to the light
- Religious affiliation: Christian
- Established: September 1988
- Founders: Mkushi Christian Fellowship
- Principal: Paul Vines
- Staff: 150
- Grades: Primary, Secondary and Sixth Form
- Age: 5 to 18
- Enrollment: ~490 pupils
- Education system: CAIE / IGCSE / GCE A-level / BTEC First Diploma Agriculture
- Language: English
- Houses: Kaimbi; Mukwa; Ndale; Kudu; Sabre; Impala
- Color
- Song: "As a witness to the light"
- Website: www.chengeloschool.org

Chengelo School is a co-educational Christian, early learning, primary and secondary, boarding, independent school, located in Mkushi in the Central Province of Zambia. The multi-campus site has a primary campus, adjacent to a secondary campus. Chengelo has a wide-range of academic and sporting offerings, including a training farm dedicated to Agriculture education.

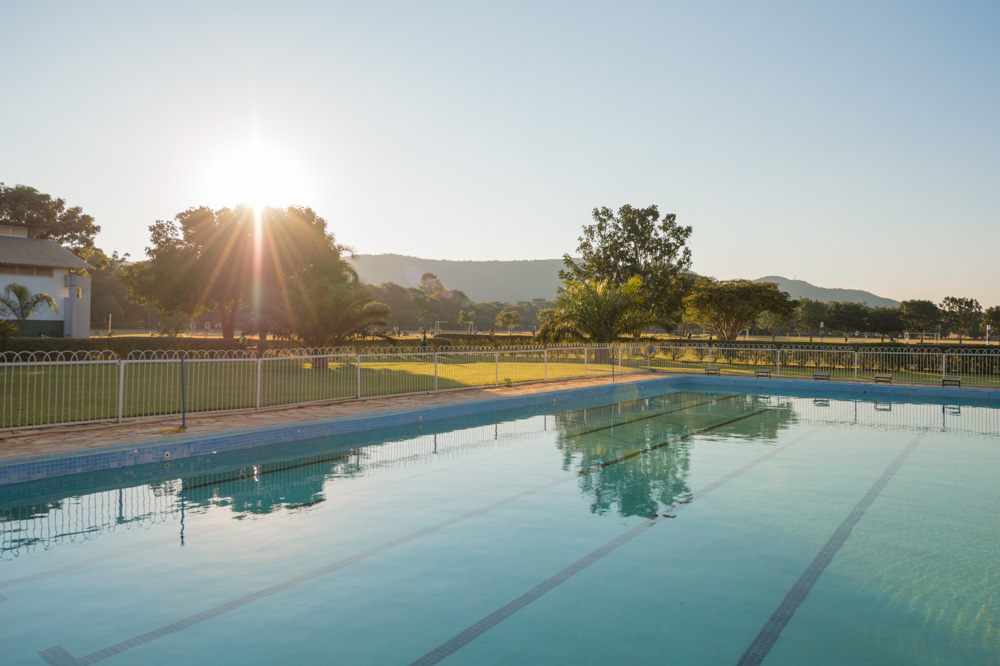

== History ==
Chengelo School first opened on the east end of the present-day campus in September 1988. It was founded by the Mkushi Christian Fellowship, led by farmers Russell Wyatt, Barton Young and David Moffat. They believe they received a clear vision from God to establish the institution. Until his death in 2023, Wyatt served on the board of trustees, together with Young and Moffat, who continue to serve.

Chengelo has grown to about 490 students, with over 150 staff. Supporters of the school included the late President of the Republic of Zambia, Levy Mwanawasa, whose children attended Chengelo.

Chengelo enrolls students of all backgrounds and faiths. The school also educates students from a missionary or farming background.

== Academics ==
Chengelo secondary students are prepared for IGCSE, GCE A Level, and/or BTEC First Diploma. The primary follows a Cambridge curriculum that prepares students for secondary.

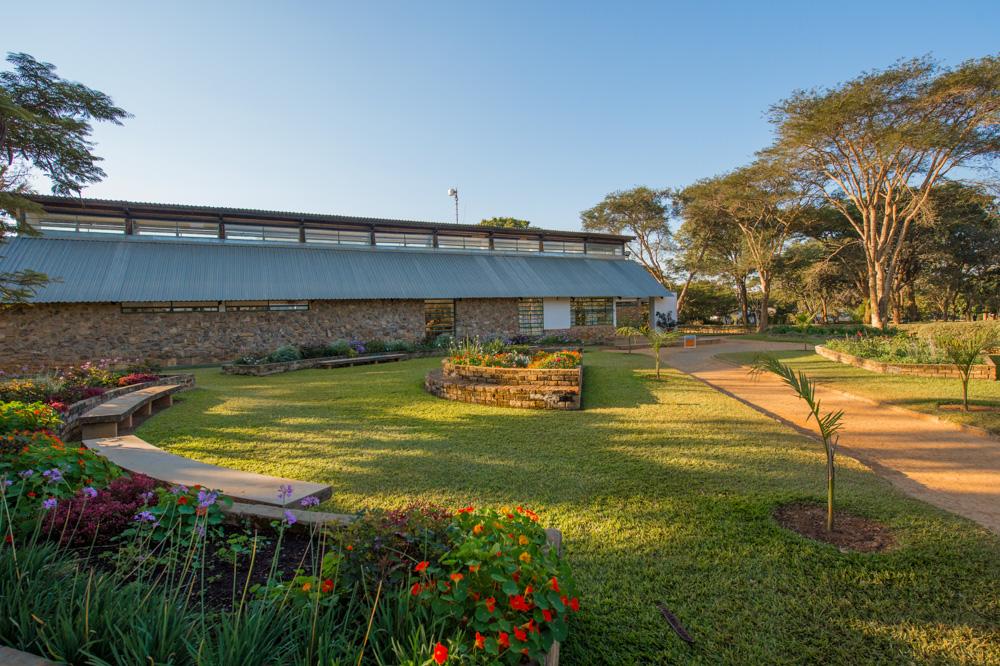
The Neil Solomon Memorial Library

In the November 2015 Cambridge exam session, five students from the school received "Top of the World" awards for scoring the highest standard mark in the world for a single subject.

== Sports ==
Chengelo's physical education curriculum includes a wide variety of sports. Chengelo consistently fields competitive teams for inter-school sports competitions.

In 2014, Chengelo formed the 'Elite Athletics Squad'. This was due to the abundant talent at Chengelo that needed expert training. During the year 2015, the squad toured the UK, participating in a number of athletic meetings.

== Ndubaluba Outdoor Centre ==
Situated thirty kilometres from the main campus is the Ndubaluba Outdoor Centre. The centre was opened in 1993 by Chengelo's founding headmaster Neil Solomon, and his wife Ruby. The centre was named after Lady Ross' Lourie known locally as an 'Ndubaluba bird'. The centre was used to run A level correspondence courses as well as outdoor activities, but soon focused solely on outdoor doings adventure education. After the departure of Neil and Ruby Solomon, running of the centre was taken over by Richard Thompson who is centre manager to the present day.
