= BTEC First Diploma =

Vocational qualification

The BTEC First Diploma is a vocational qualification taken in England and Wales and Northern Ireland by young people aged 14 and over and by adults. The qualification is organised and awarded by the Edexcel Foundation within the BTEC brand.

== Qualification Overview ==
The BTEC First Diploma is a vocational qualification at Level 2. It is the equivalent of 4 GCSE grades A*-C.

The course is available from Edexcel and is in many different subjects. This qualification is mainly studied at further education colleges. The course is designed to give students a good grounding to progress onto the BTEC Subsidiary Diploma / BTEC Diploma / BTEC Extended Diploma in a related subject.

As BTEC stands for Business & Technology Education Council, the best known subjects for the Diplomas are business and Information Technology.

The course is assessed in units of which 11-13 consist in total. Students are graded on their understanding of the unit by the grading of either a pass, merit or distinction (highest achievable). Students who wish to progress onto a BTEC Subsidiary Diploma / BTEC Diploma / BTEC Extended Diploma will usually need to attain merit grades or above in order to meet the entry requirements, however, this can vary depending on the college.

== Level ==
The First Diploma is regarded as equivalent in level to the GCSE. However some students who may have three grade Cs could progress onto a degree in a university providing that they have gained a distinction or a merit profile. Most Universities will require a Level 3 qualification such as BTEC Subsidiary Diploma / BTEC Diploma / BTEC Extended Diploma so it would be advisable to contact each University first.

The usual entry requirements consist of a mix of GCSE subject passes at grades D-G or better. Equivalent entry qualifications are also commonly accepted, including an appropriate BTEC Introductory Diploma with a merit grade or higher.

== Subjects available ==
Animal Care

Art and Design

Business

Construction

Engineering

Health and Social Care

IT and Computing

Land-based Technology

Media, Music & Performing Arts

Vehicle Technology

Science

Sport

Public Services

Travel and Tourism

Management

Hospitality

== Progression ==
Possible outcomes include:

- progression to a BTEC Extended Diploma course at a further education college
- progression into employment
