= Moleli High School =

Coordinates: 17.887°S 30.354°E

Information
- Motto: Shona: Tsvakai Chokwadi Kuyamura Vamwe (Seek the Truth to Help Others)
- Established: 1962; 63 years ago
- Founder: Ronald E. Sellers
- Sister school: Sandringham High School
- Gender: Mixed
- Enrollment: c.620
- Houses: Mamukwa; Sellers; Rusike; White

Moleli High School is a co-educational high school located in Mashonaland West Province, Makwiro, Chegutu District, Msengezi area near the town of Norton in the Zvimba area, 80 kilometres southwest of the Zimbabwean capital Harare. It offers O- and A-levels in boarding facilities. It was established in 1962 by Ronald E. Sellers of the Methodist Church in Zimbabwe and named after the late Methodist Rev. Modumedi Moleli. It is a Methodist mission school. Moleli has a student population of about 620 pupils and is considered one of Zimbabwe's top-performing high schools. It is a sister school to Sandringham High School which they share sibling rivalry.

The school motto, "Tsvakai Chokwadi Kuyamura Vamwe", is Shona, meaning "seek the truth to help others". The school is known for the Chivero Boat disaster in which 22 form 1 students were killed when their boat capsized at Lake Chivero. The school also made headlines when a mysterious hysteria hit some of the female students. In addition to academic learning, students participate in sports (including football, volleyball, basketball, table tennis), chess and debating. In the seventies, it was one of the only three African schools which played softball together with St. Ignatius and Kutama College.

Like most high schools in Zimbabwe, which follow the traditional British school system, students at Moleli are divided into four houses, each having its own colour: Mamukwa (blue), Sellers (green), Rusike (red), and White (yellow).

== Notable alumni ==
- Tony Gara, MP and mayor of Harare
- Gershom Pasi, Former Zimbabwe Revenue Authority (Zimra) Commissioner-General
- Bukhosi Mhlanga, Radio Presenter and Former Chief Executive Officer Of Free Hosting Africa
- Ziyambi Ziyambi, Minister of Justice, Legal and Parliamentary Affairs.
