= International School of Barcelona =

- Sitges, Catalonia; Spain

Information
- Other name: BSB Sitges (The British School of Barcelona) - Current. Since 2016
- Former name: ESCAAN International School
- Type: Private international Early Years and Primary school
- Established: September 1994; 31 years ago
- Status: Cognita school
- Grades: K-12; including baccalaureate
- Age range: 2 to 11
- Enrolment: c. 300
- Website: www.britishschoolbarcelona.com

International School of Barcelona, abbreviated as ISB, and formerly known as ESCAAN International School, was a Private international primary and secondary school, with an option for boarding, located in a quiet residential overlooking the town of Sitges, Catalonia, an autonomous community in the northeastern corner of Spain.

ISB was acquired by the international educational group Cognita on 1st January 2016. As from September, the school was integrated as a new campus under the brand of The British School of Barcelona. Therefore, international School of Barcelona became a Cognita school, changing its name for BSB Sitges and becoming the second campus of BSB at that time.

After the change of ownership, the school currently known as BSB Sitges became a Pre-Nursery, Early years and Primary school for students from 2 to 11 years of age. The previous offer of Secondary and Sixth Form is now delivered at the sister campus BSB Castelldefels where all BSB Sitges students continue their education when they graduate from Primary. It is no longer a boarding school.

== School organisation and studies ==
- Early Years (2 to 4 years)
- Primary (5 to 11 years)
- Secondary and Pre-University (with two pathways to choose from: IB Diploma Programme and the Cambridge A Level) are currently delivered at BSB Castelldefels.

All courses from Early Years and Primary are based on the English National Curriculum. All subjects except foreign languages are taught in English.

== Facilities ==
Current BSB Sitges campus (former ISB School) is a three-stored building, with classrooms and learning and library spaces as well as Early Years learning areas, a languages Centre, an Information Technology Centre, a Food Technology Centre, STEAM & Reading areas, a Music room and three music rehearsal rooms, a theatre, a dining rooms, a medical room and play spaces and sports areas. It also has an agreement with the adjoining Sports Club to benefit from their first-class sports facilities, such as the Olympic swimming pool and tennis courts. The school provides transport to and from the cities that lie between Barcelona and Tarragona.

== See also ==
- Education in Catalan
