= Chinese-Armenian Friendship School =

School in Yerevan, Armenia

Coordinates: 40.216305°N 44.534903°E

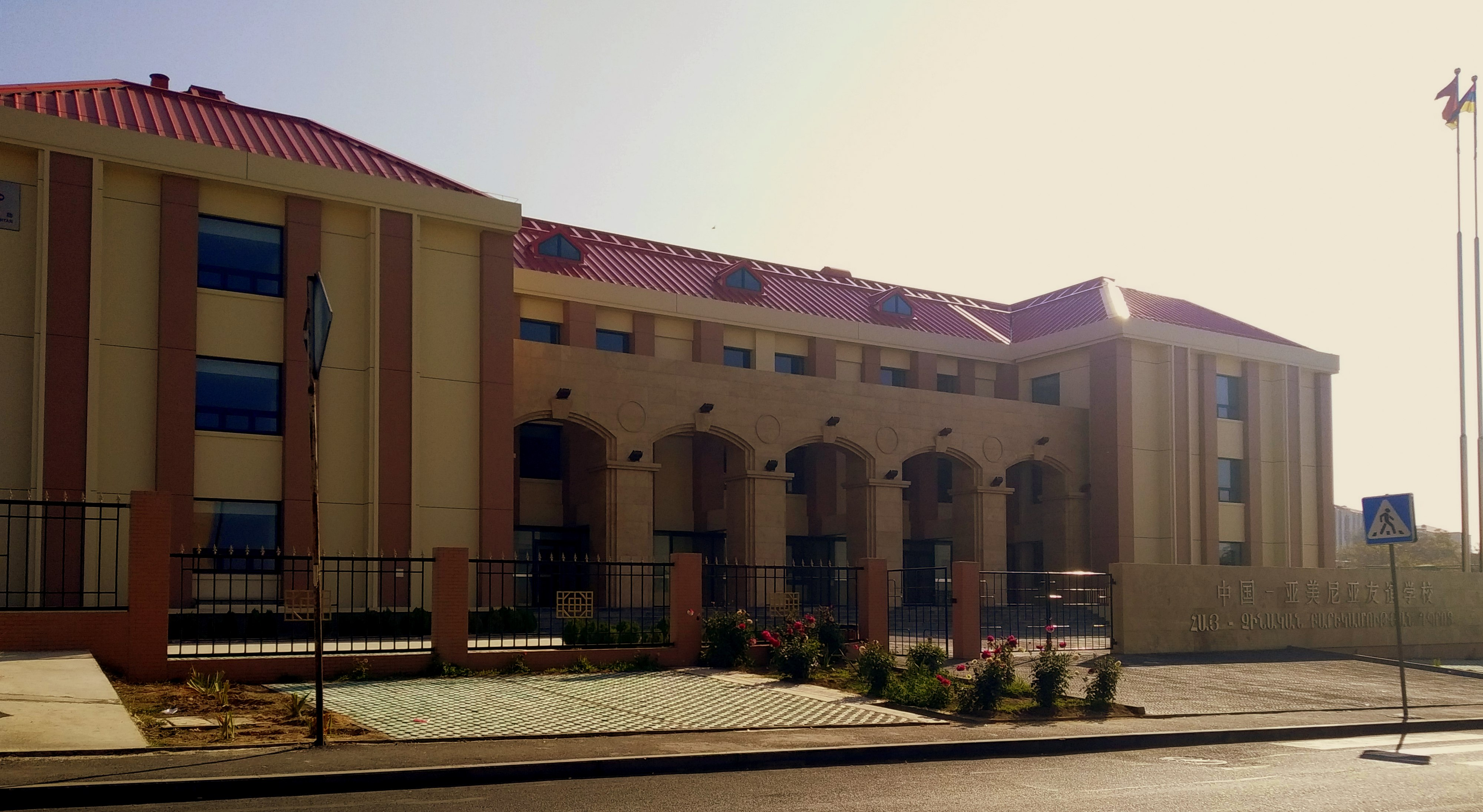
- School building

Chinese name
- Simplified Chinese: 中国-亚美尼亚友谊学校
- Traditional Chinese: 中國亞美尼亞友誼學校
Transcriptions
Standard Mandarin
- Hanyu Pinyin: Zhōngguó-Yàměiníyà Yǒuyì Xuéxiào

Armenian name
- Armenian: Հայ-չինական բարեկամության դպրոց

Chinese-Armenian Friendship School (Armenian: Հայ-չինական բարեկամության դպրոց, Chinese: 中国-亚美尼亚友谊学校) is a school in Kanaker, Yerevan, Armenia. It serves grades 5 through 12. It is Armenian-medium with Chinese language being a major focus of study.

The school, with a capacity of 405 students, opened on August 22, 2018. It includes a museum related to Chinese-relevant topics. Nikol Pashinyan, the Prime Minister of Armenia, and Tian Erlong, the Ambassador of China to Armenia, attended the school's opening. The school building and supplies had a cost of over $12 million, and the funds to do so came from the Chinese government.

It functions as a boarding school for students who are not from the Yerevan area.

== See also ==
- Armenia-China relations
- Education in Armenia
