= St. George's The British International School =

Coordinates: 50°52′33″N 6°56′48″E

St. George's School
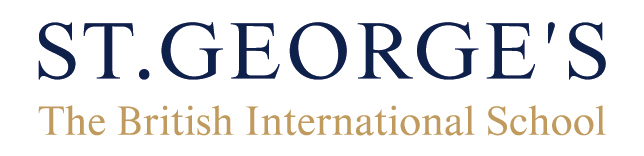
- The British International School
- Cologne, Duisburg, Munich

Information
- School type: International school
- Established: 1985
- Founder: Marietta Horton
- Language: English
- Website: www.stgeorgesschool.com

St. George's School is an IB World School, for students from age 2-18.

St George's is a private school and teaches the English National Curriculum (in form of IGCSE at Key Stage 4 - at age 16) and the IB Diploma Programme after Key Stage 4 (at age 16-18).

St. George's is a coeducational school which is run independently from local or state financial support.

It has schools in three German cities: Cologne, Duisburg and Munich. St. George's School Cologne was the first British boarding school in Germany.

School uniform is compulsory, with the aim of improving discipline, reducing social exclusion and strengthening the identity of the school.

== Locations ==
St. George's School Cologne is the oldest school, founded in 1985. The school has been an International Baccalaureate World School since April 2006, and offers the IB Diploma Programme. St. George's has established two further schools, St. George's School Duisburg (opened in September 2002) and St. George's School Munich (opened in September 2013). St. George's Munich acquired a new school building on a 20-year lease in 2018 with construction completing in 2019.

The addresses of the schools are as follows:

Cologne - Husarenstraße 20, 50997 Köln

Duisburg - Am Neuen Angerbach 90, 47259 Duisburg

Munich - Heidemannstraße 182, 80939 München

== See also ==
- German schools in the United Kingdom: German School London
