= CJD Christophorusschule Königswinter =

Private secondary school in Rhein-Sieg-Kreis, Germany

Coordinates: 50°41′00″N 7°11′14″E

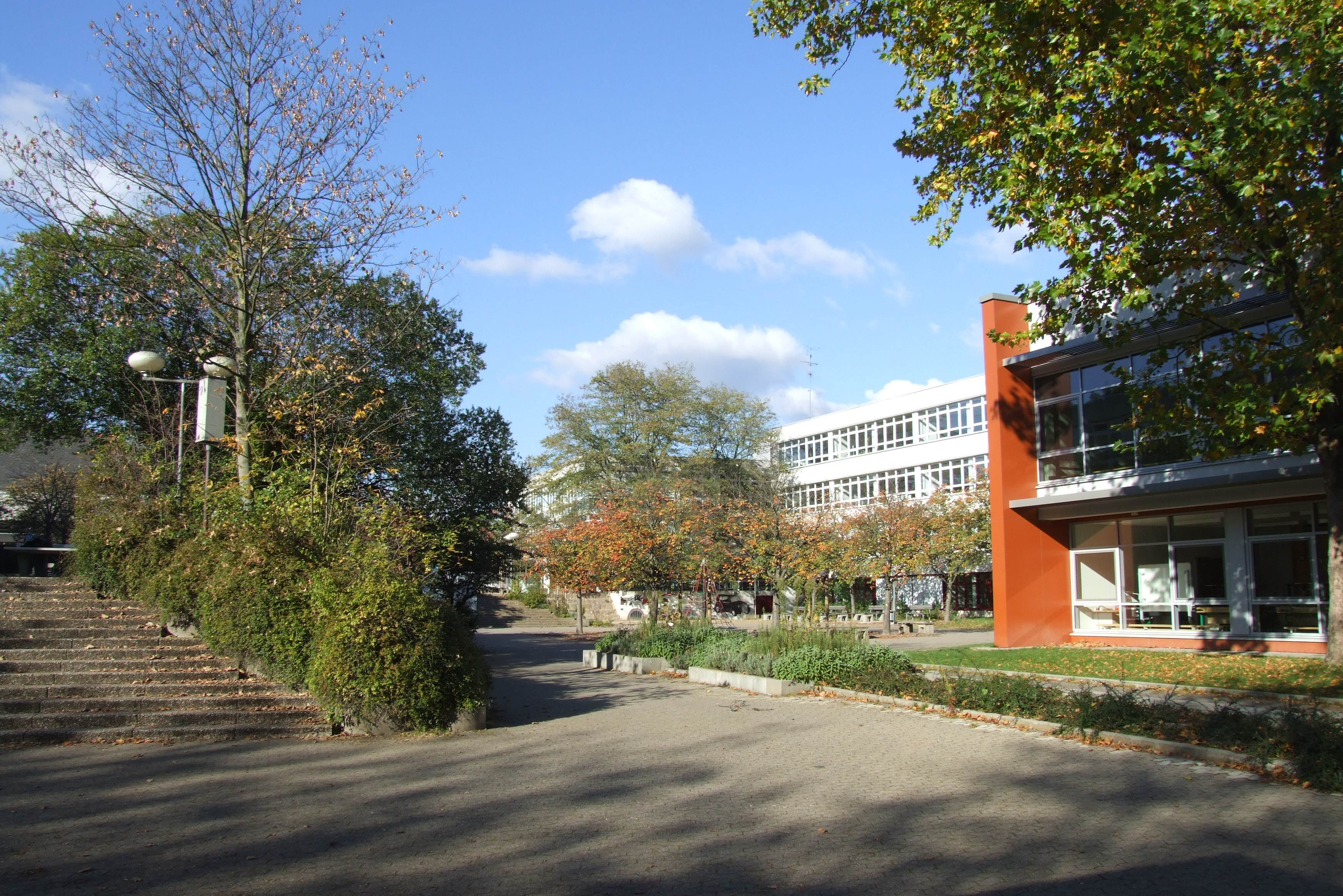
- Cleethorpeser Platz 12; 53639 Königswinter; Königswinter, North Rhine-Westphalia; Germany

Information
- Type: private, Christian
- Motto: Let nobody be lost!
- Established: 1992
- Principal: Reinhard Koglin, Wilhelm Meyer, Martin Krude, Peter Malburg
- Faculty: 105
- Enrollment: 1450
- Website: www.cjd-koenigswinter.de

The CJD Christophorusschule Königswinter is a state recognized private, alternative school located in Rhein-Sieg-Kreis (North Rhine-Westphalia, on the border to Rhineland-Palatinate), and is run by the Christliches Jugenddorfwerk Deutschlands (Christian Youth Village Foundation of Germany – CJD). The school consists of a secondary school and a high school, which correspond to the state equivalents. The Christophorusschule has about 1,450 male and female students (including 400 in the secondary school), and about 105 teachers for instruction. In addition, a dormitory is available for students in grades 5-12, a branch for the highly gifted students, a knowledge center for gifted demands, and a school psychology service with certified psychologists.

Also, there is an exchange program with schools in the United States (Milford, Ohio), France (Avignon, Cognac and Sangatte), Spain (Boadilla del Monte), Sweden (Kungsbacka) and Japan.

== History ==
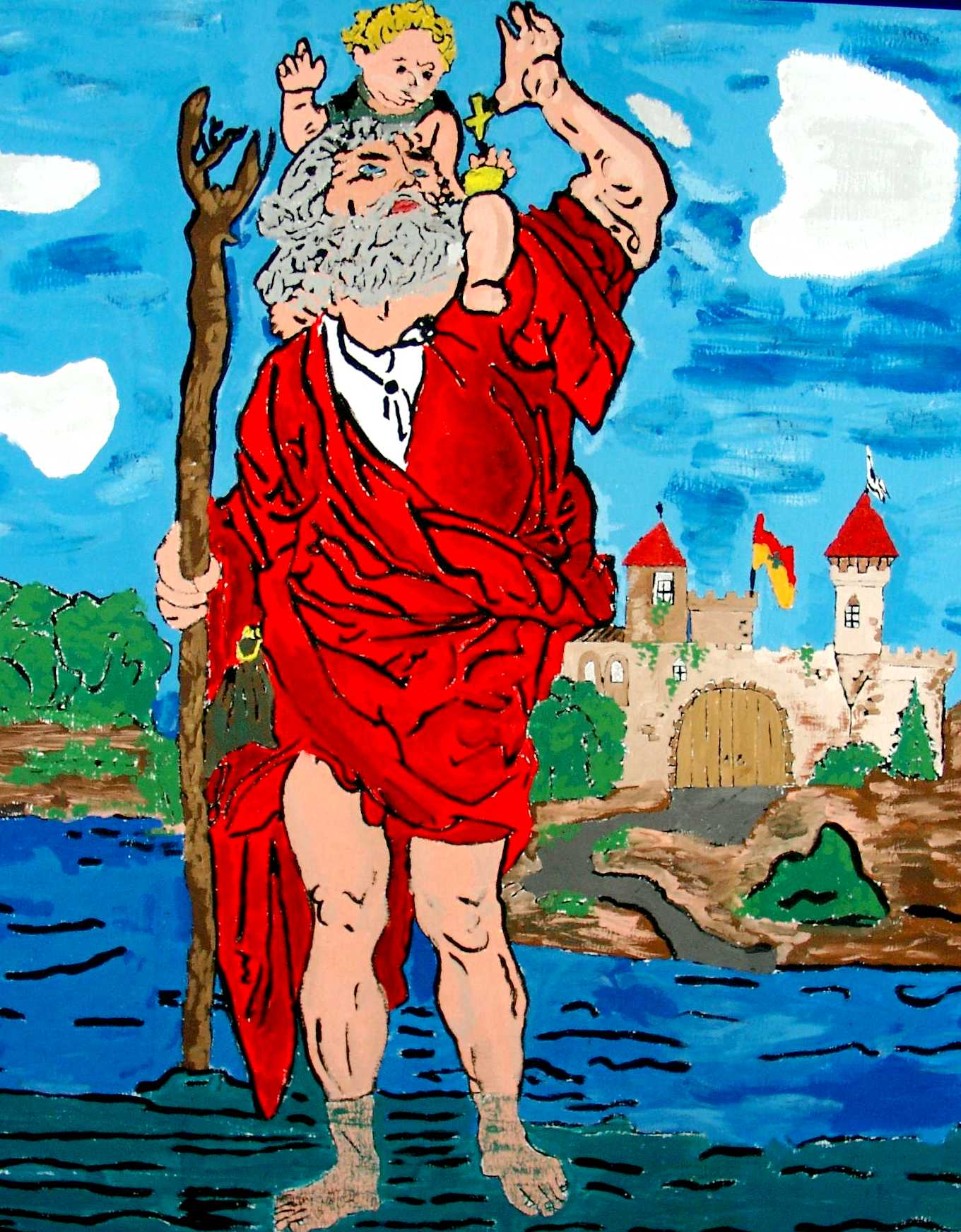
Picture of Saint Christopher

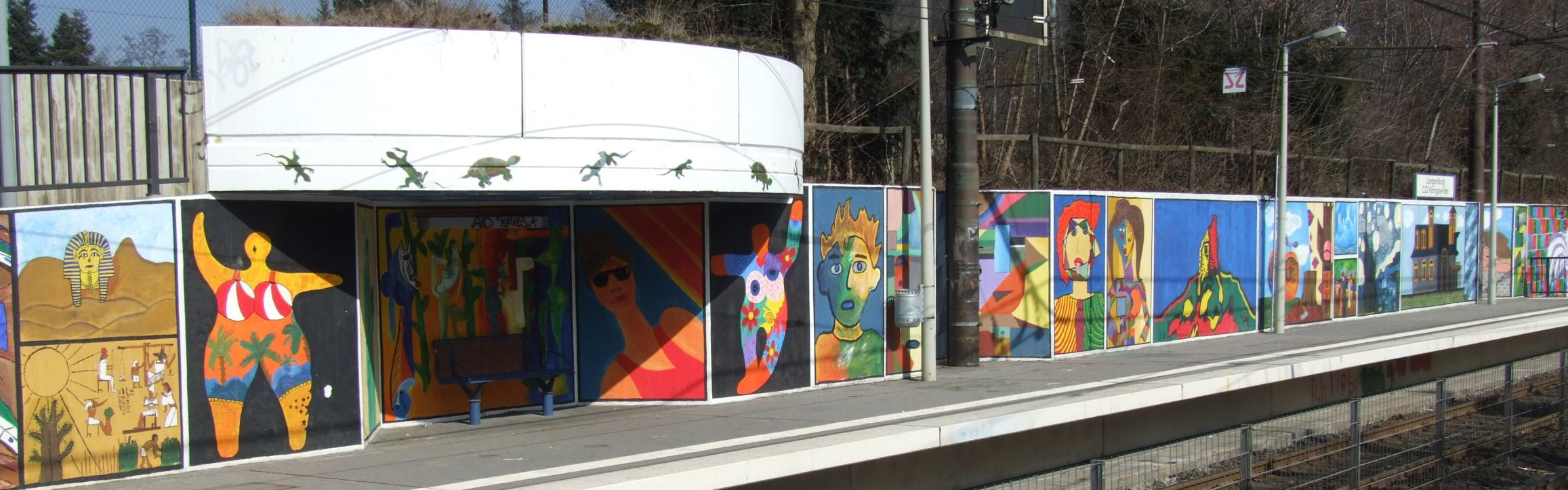
Stop Longenburg – CJD Königswinter

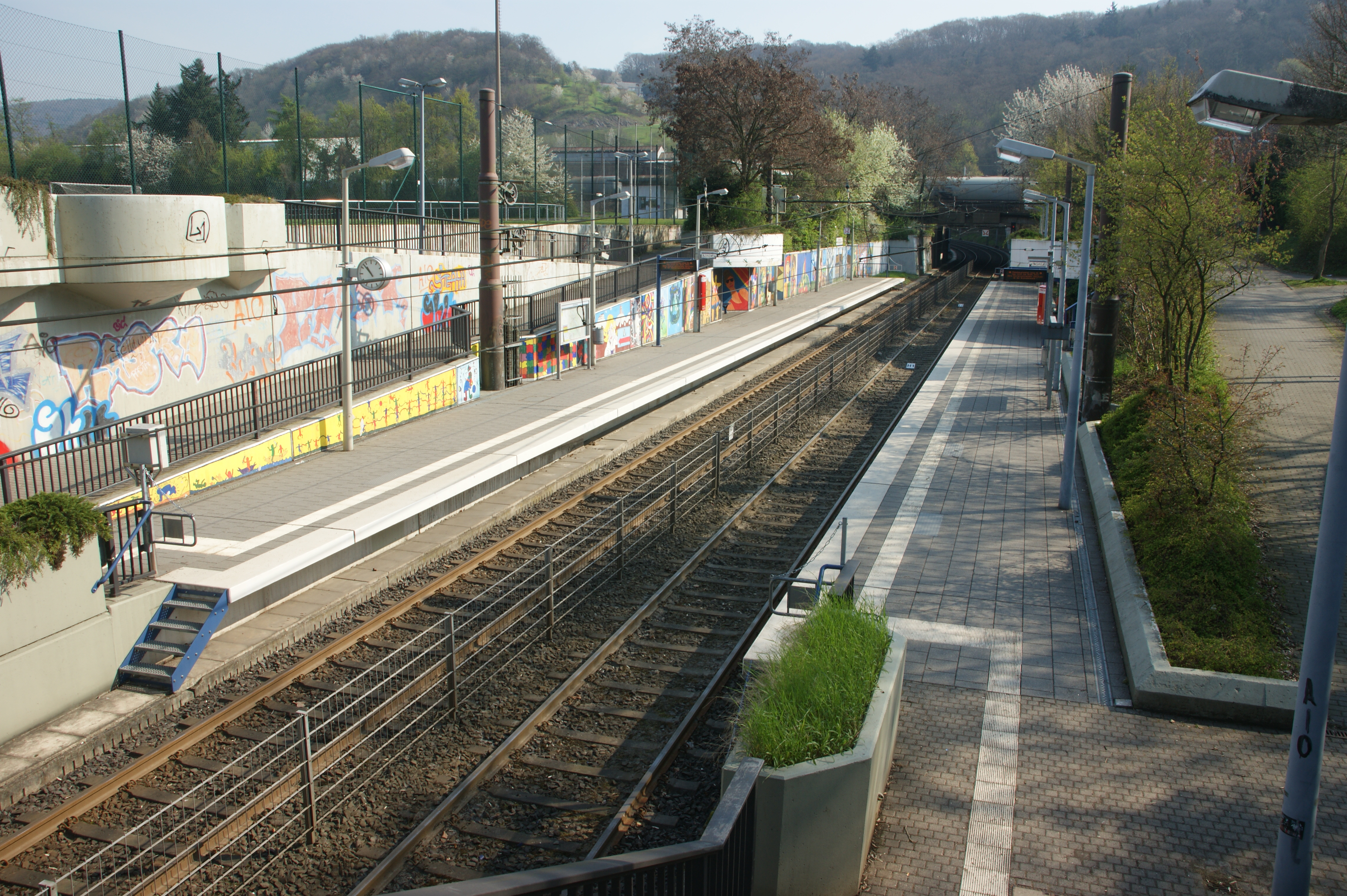
Longenburg – CJD Königswinter

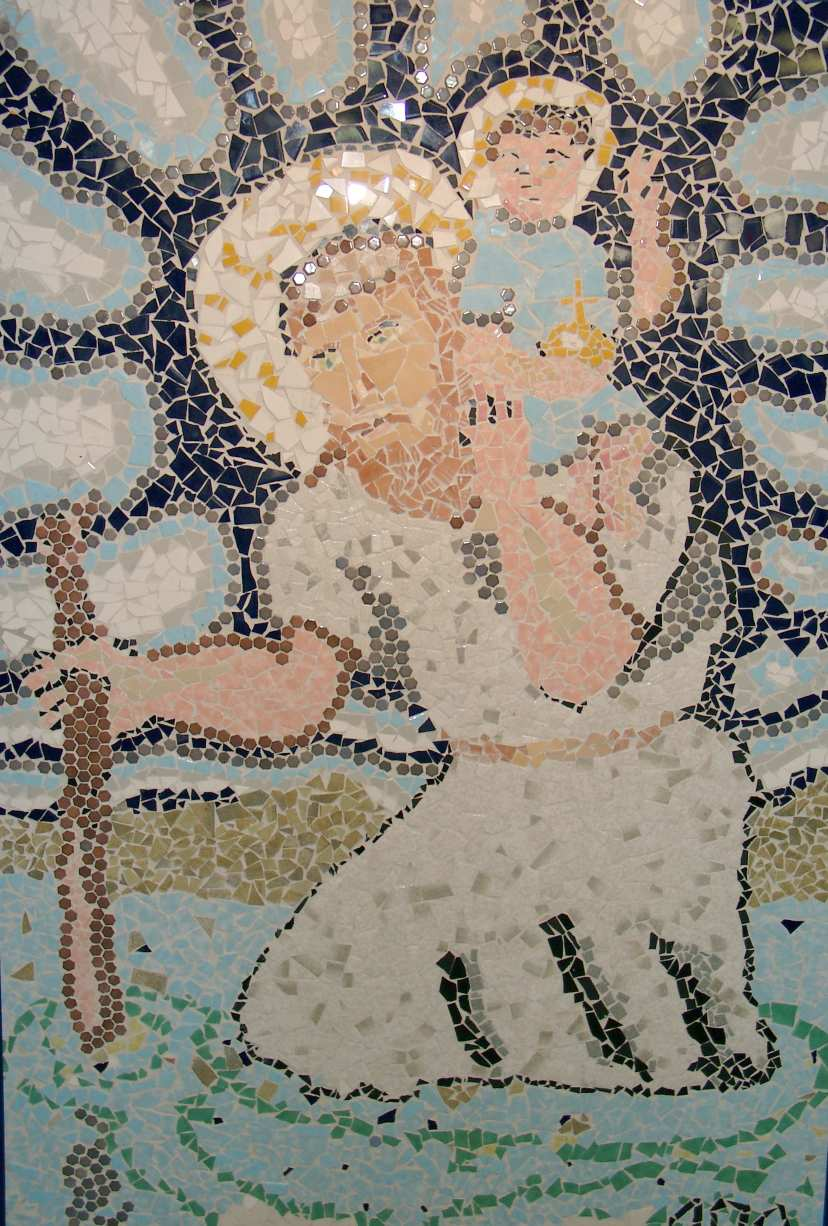
Mosaic of Saint Christopher

The Christophorusschule was founded by the CJD in 1992, with a staff consisting of just under 20 teachers, 7 of which, including the former principal, Hans Joachim Gardyan, came from the CJD Braunschweig. The school began in 1992 with a total of 360 students from grades 5–8 in the secondary school and from grades 5–11 in the high school. The first instruction building used was the previous school of Gymnasium am Petersberg which was built in 1971 and closed in 1991. Later, with the increase in student numbers, the 1995 building of the closed Städische Realschule am Petersberg was used to make room. This along with the Petersberggymnasium made up a school center. Before the school opening, the city of Königwinter made a fierce argument about the future of the empty school buildings because they had actually planned to open an alternative state institution, comprehensive school in 1991, but plans were delayed one year. In 1995, Christophorusschule had its first graduation class. In 2000, the dormitory (with groups living in the former Pfarrhaus of St. Remigius with approximately 70 rooms) opened. In September 2005 (with support from the German Telephone Company Deutsche Telekom Donations and their chairman, Klaus Kinkel) grades 9 and 10 started a different field in the high school called the Junior Engineer Academy, which modified the Baden-Württemberger Student Engineer Academy at the middle level. In January 2006, the Bonn-Berlin-Ausgleich financed the opening of the CJD Fine Arts House, which is available to students and organizations in the region. Hans Joachim Gardyan was named the school principal from 1992 to 2006. His successors were Reinhard Koglin (head principal), Johannes Heide (principal of the high school) and Jörg Möller (principal of the secondary school until January 2009, followed by Andreas Breitenstein), beginning in the 2006/2007 school year.

== Location ==
The Christophorusschule is located near the old downtown of Königswinter, about 200 meter away from the Rhine River. Immediately, in the area, lies the dormitory, the church Maria, Königin des Friedens (Queen of the Heaven), an outside sports field, the gymnasium, and the Königswinter Paul-Lemmerz indoor swimming pool. And, the school has an auditorium with 700 seats, which is used for school events. In June 2005, the Longenburg stop of the Telekom-Express city train line (SWB Line 66) was transformed by students in different art classes. In return, since the end of 2005, the stop has taken the name “Longenburg-CJD Königswinter.”

== Specific Features ==
Along with the classes for the secondary school and high school, there are two additional classes per grade levels 5-9 (so-called integrated classes), in which approximately half the students are gifted students and the other half are outstanding high school students. Also, in the 2006/2007 school year, beginning with grade 6, a new Research subject was introduced. In the grades 10–12, there is a class for gifted students in every level. In the honors course, they have separate courses and they register for three honors courses (instead of two, which is common of the higher grades). The actual instruction time in the school year in these courses is shortened to allow for the subsequent project phase. The school offers an extensive program, with about 100 extracurricular activities, including a junior company, a bee-keeper program, a paramedic study group, and a Japanese study group. Japanese is also taught as a regular subject in the higher grades and can be chosen as a subject for the final graduation examination. Students also have the opportunity to achieve the internationally recognized DELF-Diploma (French), the Cambridge Certificate (English) or the DELE (Spanish). A music school is included in the high school to enable students to learn an instrument in the afternoon. Above that, there is an orchestra with a choir and a popular band called Tinitus.

== Famous Graduates ==
- Sophie Moser, Violinist. When she was a student she had already won renowned awards and has performed all over the world. At the age of 18, she toured with Daniel Barenboim.
- Axel Bellinghausen, Soccer Player.

== Motto ==
- Let nobody be lost! (Keiner darf verloren gehen!)
- Everyone has a chance! (Jedem seine Chance!)
- Not for all the same, but for all the best! (Nicht für alle das Gleiche, sondern für jeden das Beste!)
