= Emerald Academy =

Emerald Academy Higher Secondary School
- एमेरल्ड एकाडेमी उच्च माध्यमिक बिद्यालय
- Bhadrapur, Province No. 1, 57203; Nepal

Information
- Other name: Emerald Academy and College, Emerald Academy
- School type: Private Institutional
- Religious affiliation: None
- Established: 1986
- Status: Open
- Authority: District Education Office Jhapa
- Grades: Kindergarten - high school
- Enrollment: 500
- Language: English
- Campus type: Urban
- Color: Black White
- Accreditation: National Examination Board (Nepal)
- Communities served: Jhapa, South Eastern Nepal
- Graduates: 99.9%

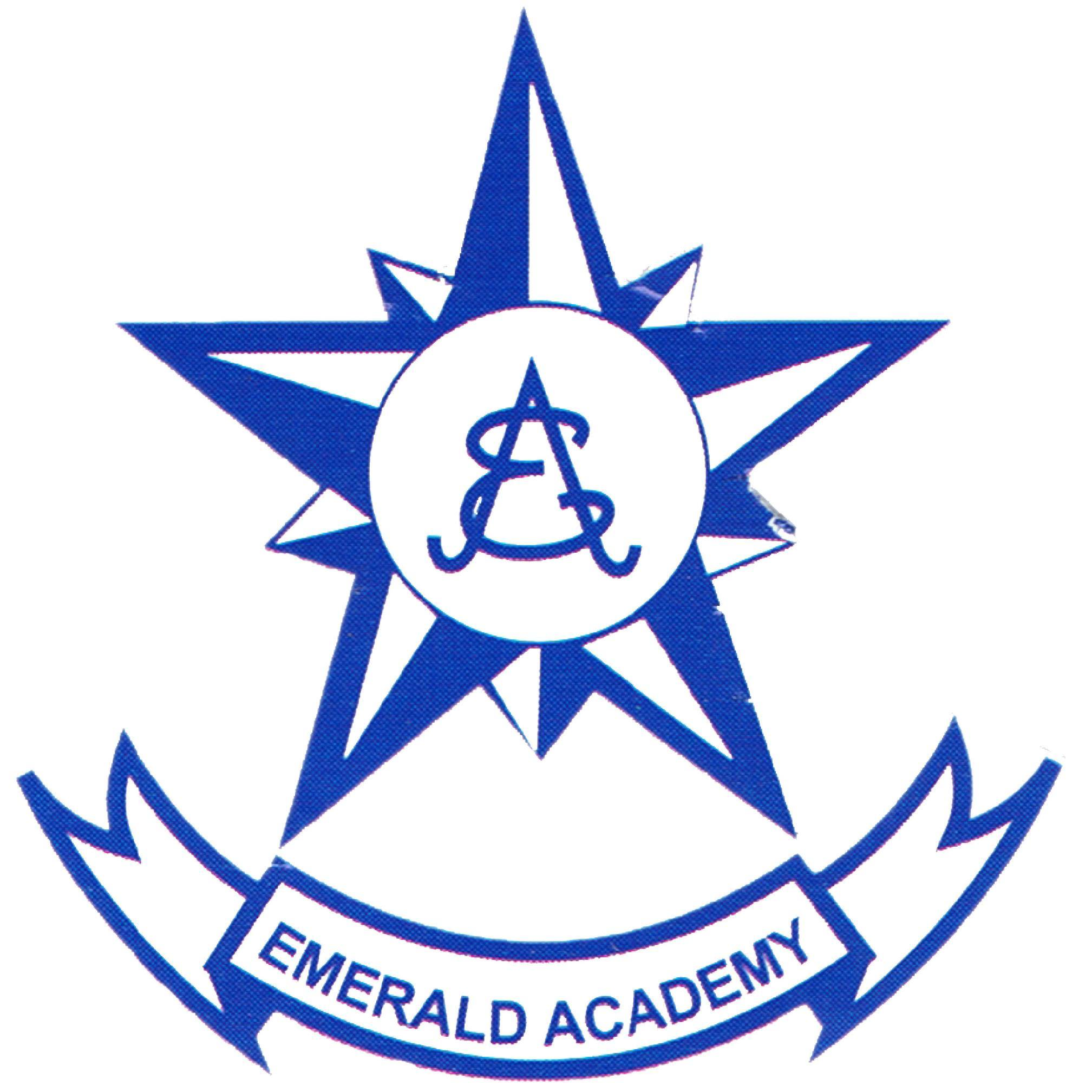
logo

Emerald Academy Higher Secondary School is located in Bhadrapur, Jhapa, Nepal. It is a private educational institution that provides education from kindergarten to higher secondary levels, and it is affiliated with Nepal's National Examination Board (NEB).

== History ==
Established in 1986, the academy has grown over time and now includes both secondary and higher secondary education, along with a separate college wing offering undergraduate studies, such as Bachelor in Business Studies (BBS) under Tribhuvan University.

The main building was used for kindergarten, junior education, and various activities such as music, sports, and assemblies. Emerald Academy also opened a branch in Ekantakuna Lalitpur. This branch included only one building until 2003, when Emerald Academy purchased another building across the road. This second branch was used for secondary education.

== Education ==
The medium of instruction is English language with emphasis on formal dress code of Black and White.

1) Lower Kindergarten till Grade 10 (Secondary Education Examination)

2) 10+2 (Science, Humanities and Management with Hotel Management and computer sciences) Under National Examination Board

3) Bachelors In Business Studies - BBS 4 year (Tribhuvan University affiliated)
