= Jameson High School =

Coordinates: 18.332724°S 29.909721°E

Location
- 29 Mashonganyika Ave, Kadoma; Zimbabwe

Information
- Type: Government Boarding school, Government Day school
- Denomination: Interdenominational

Jameson High School, located in Kadoma, Zimbabwe, offers education from Form 1 up to A-Level.

Jameson High School was named after Sir Leander Starr Jameson, a Doctor and an administrator of the former Rhodesia, now Zimbabwe. Jameson is a co-ed, interracial school which offers sports such as rugby, cricket, tennis, basketball, swimming, field hockey, netball, track & field and volleyball.

There are four hostels, Warne House (boys - the Bulldogs), Starr House, (boys - the Mighty Men), Leander Hostel (girls- the Birds) and Hoult House (girls- the Bunnies). Around 700 students enroll at the school yearly and 200 live in boarding. The school motto is 'Sine Metu' (Latin for 'without fear') and the school mascot is a Panda Bear.

== List of Headmasters at Jameson High School ==
- Mr. Tony Tanser (1941 - 1943)
- Mr. David Stewart (1944 - 1945)
- Mr. John Simpson (1945 - 1961)
- Mr. Duncan Whaley (1961 - 1968)
- Mr. Angus Burns (1968 -)
- Mr. Jock Steenkamp (1978 - 1980)
- Mr. Roy Gordon (1980 - 1984)
- Mr. Rick Kershaw
- Mr. David Mutambara (1985 - 1994)
- Mrs. Noma Konono
- Mr. Ngara (1995 - 1998)
- Mr. Runyowa (1999 - )
- Mr Matsiwe (2008–Present
