= Bristol Academy, Abuja =

School in Abuja, Nigeria

Location
- Abuja; Nigeria
- Coordinates: 8.99798°N 7.55547°E

Information
- Established: 2002
- Staff: 70
- Enrollment: 338

Bristol Academy is an international pre-school, primary school and secondary school in Karu, Abuja, Nigeria established in September 2002.

It has approximately 338 students and 70 staff.
