= Guangzhou Experimental Foreign Language School =

Private secondary school in Guangzhou, Guangdong, China

- 广州市广外附设外语学校

Location
- 599 Guanghua First Road; Baiyun District; Guangzhou, Guangdong, 510450; China; 23°14′37″N 113°14′59″E

Information
- Founded: 1993; 33 years ago
- Education system: Chinese; Nova Scotia (Sino-Canadian program)
- Website: gwdwx.com

The Guangzhou Experimental Foreign Language School (广州市广外附设外语学校) is a private secondary school in Guangzhou, Guangdong, China. The school is affiliated with the private Guangdong University of Foreign Studies.

In 2022, the school was renamed Guangzhou Experimental Foreign Language School. It offers a Sino-Canadian program based on the Nova Scotia high school curriculum for grades 10 to 12; students who meet the requirements can earn a Nova Scotia High School Diploma.
