= Chelsea International Academy =

School in Bagmati Province, Nepal

Vidhya Sanskar School
- An Undertaking of Chelsea International Academy
- Attarkhel, Gokarneshwar Municipality, Bagmati Province; Nepal

Information
- Type: Higher secondary school
- Motto: Vision Through Virtue
- Established: 2005
- School district: Kathmandu District
- Principal: Sudhir Kumar Jha
- International students: No
- Student to teacher ratio: 20:1
- Language: English, Nepali
- Song: सु संस्कृत अनुसासित सिक्षित उच्च बिचार, सब को गौरव, सब को प्यारो हाम्रो बिध्या संस्कार ।
- Yearbook: Chelsea Wavelength

Chelsea International Academy, is a Higher Secondary boarding school in Nepal. The college is located at Lakhe Chaur Marg, Kathmandu and the school is located at Attarkhel. Gokarneshwar Municipality. The School was founded in 2005 and has been focusing on Pre-Primary school, Primary School, Lower Secondary through Montessori method and Cambridge GCE A-Level. There have been three world topper of A levels from this school and 77+ Nepal toppers.

== Academics ==
The school operates three courses of study:

- School Leaving Certificate level (a nationwide curriculum up to class 10 prescribed by the Department of Education of Nepal)
- +2 Science and Management (affiliated to NEB),
- Cambridge International A-Level

== Subjects offered in Cambridge International A-Level ==
=== Science Stream ===
- Mathematics
- Physics
- Biology
- Chemistry
- Computer Science

=== Non Science Stream ===
- Economics
- Business
- Accounting
- Sociology
- Psychology
- Information Technology
- Art and Design

== Guidance Counseling ==
The institution provides A Level students with comprehensive university application support through dedicated guidance counseling. This includes personalized advice based on individual aptitude and interests, alongside resources for independent research. Students are encouraged to evaluate prospective colleges based on academic programs, campus culture, and financial requirements.

== Infrastructure and facilities ==
Key infrastructures of the school are as follows:

- Operational lab for science (physics, chemistry and biology).
- ICT Lab
- Multiple dining halls
- Library
