= Isamilo International School Mwanza =

Coordinates: 2°30′30.33″S 32°54′24.55″E

Isamilo International School

Location
- Isamilo; Mwanza; Tanzania, PO Box: 42

Information
- Motto: The Right Balance
- Denomination: Diocese of Pacific Ocean
- Gender: Co-educational
- Age: 3 to 18
- Houses: 3
- Colours: Sky Blue and Navy Blue
- Boarding Facility: Yes (Male & Female)
- DfCSf No.: 703 6228
- CIE Center Number: TZ020
- UCAS Code: 45898

Isamilo International School Mwanza, founded in 1956, is an international school for students aged 3 to 18 in Mwanza, Tanzania. The school has been known as The Government European School, Isamilo Primary School and Isamilo School Mwanza before being renamed in 2008 to its present name, Isamilo International School Mwanza.

The school teaches subjects in accordance with the National Curriculum for England. The school has added A-Levels and boarding to the school as an addition to the IGCSEs that it has offered since 1998 when it opened the secondary school. Exams are provided by the Cambridge International Examinations (CIE) board.

The original school motto was "quisque ingenium perficiat" and the new school slogan, adopted in 2008, is "The Right Balance". The school is registered with the Tanzanian Ministry of Education and Culture (Nos: MZ.01/4/002 & S.957), the British Department for Children, Schools and Families (DfCSf No. 703 6228), and the Association of International Schools in Africa (AISA).
