= Sedbergh School (Quebec) =

Private English-language senior school in Montebello, Quebec, Canada

Coordinates: 46.5740°N 74.3994°W

Sedbergh School was a private English language boarding school located in Montebello, Quebec, Canada. Founded in 1939, it offered coeducation programs (grade seven to university entrance) for Canadian and international students.

Due to declining enrollment and poor economic forecasts, Sedbergh School closed operations in June 2010.

== Notable alumni ==
- Peter Kirby
- Michael Pitfield
- Scott Griffin
