= Carlsbad International School =

Coordinates: 50°12′49.48″N 12°52′49.62″E

Information
- School type: International Boarding School
- Established: 2014
- Grades: 9-12
- Website: https://carlsbadschool.wixsite.com/cimun

Carlsbad International School was a private, co-educational, Central European, boarding and day school for high school students, Grades 9 – 12. It is located in the UNESCO candidate spa town of Karlovy Vary, west of Prague, in the Czech Republic.

== History ==
The school was founded in 2014.

In March 2015 it was accredited by the International Baccalaureate Organization to administer the IB Diploma Programme.

== Structure ==
It is a member of the Association of European Boarding Schools. Full boarding tuition is €37,000, while day students pay €20,000. In May 2017 it became a Member of the Council of International Schools and its first class of 18 IB students graduated. In summer, CIS organizes international Summer Camps offering an ESL programme, filmmaking, tennis or golf. The faculty to student ratio is 1:4 and the average CIS class size is 8. CIS Faculty are 80% native English speakers and 67% hold advanced degrees. CIS offers a wide variety of Activities, sports clubs (including football, volleyball, basketball, badminton) and specialized sports programmes with individual study and training plans (tennis, triathlon and golf). CIS provides a healthy lifestyle, safety, top pastoral care and international community spirit with over 30 nationalities represented. CIS facilities include a premium school restaurant, Tennis Club Gejzirpark with a modern fitness center and skiing slopes on the top of Klínovec in the Ore Mountains.
