= SMS Muar =

Sekolah Menengah Sains Muar
- SAMURA

Location
- Johor; Malaysia
- Coordinates: 2°03′N 102°33′E

Information
- Type: Public Secondary School, boarding School; Sekolah Berprestasi Tinggi; Sekolah Berasrama Penuh
- Motto: Berilmu Berbakti (To have knowledge, to serve)
- Established: 31 May 1983
- School code: JEA9004
- Principal: Tn. Haji Mohd Fared bin Samin
- Grades: Form 1-Form 5
- Enrollment: 750-800
- Classrooms: Arif, Bijak, Cerdik, Dinamik, Gigih
- Houses: Pujangga; Sarjana; Bestari; Budiman
- Colour: Blue White Red Yellow
- Slogan: Dipimpin untuk memimpin
- Rival: Sekolah Tun Fatimah, SMS Kota Tinggi, Sekolah Dato' Abdul Razak
- National ranking: 31
- Yearbook: Legacy
- Affiliations: Sekolah Berasrama Penuh Ministry of Education (Malaysia)
- Alumni name: Alumni SAMURA
- Website: www.samura.edu.my

Sekolah Menengah Sains Muar (English: Muar Science Secondary School; abbreviated SAMURA) is a full boarding public residential school (Sekolah Berasrama Penuh) in Tanjung Agas, Tangkak (formerly part of Muar), Johor, Malaysia. It is the only government-funded school in the Tangkak district bearing the title Science School. In 2011, the school was awarded with the Sekolah Berprestasi Tinggi or High Performance School title, awarded to schools in Malaysia that have met stringent criteria including academic achievement, strength of alumni, international recognition, network and linkages. Their performance in the recent 2024's Sijil Pelajaran Malaysia examination is GPS of 1.75 .The school is also an adopted school for Multimedia University.

== History ==
The school was established on 31 May 1983 in Tanjung Agas, Muar, Johor, on a 42-acre (170,000 m^{2}) site near the main road that connects the cities of Muar and Tangkak. 204 first-former students registered that day. In the following month, a second group of 421 students under the sponsorship of Malaysian Department of Civil Service registered to undergo TOEFL preparation course for overseas universities. A third group of students, consisting of 175 fourth-former students, registered on 1 September 1983.

The school enrolled Form 1 students at the beginning of its operation. However commencing from 1988, SMS Muar ceased the intake of Form 1 students. Since then, it accepted only Form 4 students. Although for a short and limited period of time from 1991 to 1994, it did receive Upper and Lower Sixth formers as well. SMS Muar has now resumed to accept intakes of the Form 1 students commencing from 2016 until to-date.

In 1992, the school achieved a 100% grade one (1st. Grade) result in the Sijil Pelajaran Malaysia (Malaysian Certificate of Education). Upon completion of the Sixth Formers batch of STPM 1994, the school was chosen to provide a matriculation programme for Universiti Malaysia Sabah from 1995 up until May 2000. Thereafter until 2015, SMS Muar (acronym "SAMURA") has only fourth and fifth formers.

SAMURA achieved no. 1 ranks for SPM examination results in Johor school for four consecutive years from 2005 to 2009, outperforming other SBP schools in the state primarily Sekolah Tun Fatimah and Sekolah Menengah Sains Johor.

In 2016, after the redelineation of districts & introduction of a few new districts in Johor DT state, SAMURA is classified as a school within the district of Tangkak and no longer under the administration of Muar district.

== Notable alumni ==
- Datuk Khairussaleh Ramli (CEO/MD RHB Bank Bhd and RHB Group) - Class of '84
- Ambassador Siti Hajjar Adnin (Former Malaysia's Ambassador to Ireland) - Class of '85
- Ali Hassan bin Mohd Hassan (CEO & Founder Al-Ikhsan Sports) - Class of '87
- Omar Mustapha Ong (Former Advisor to the 6th Prime Minister of Malaysia) - Class of '88
- Wan Hasliza Wan Zainuddin (Film Director/Producer) - Class of '89
- Tuan Syed Alwi Mohamed Sultan (Former CEO AgroBank Malaysia Berhad) - Class of '91
- Hasrul Farid Hasnan (Chief Internal Auditor, SME Bank Malaysia Berhad) - Class of '91
- YB. Hahasrin Hashim (ADUN Johor N.34 Panti) - Class of '93
- Mohd Idzwan bin Yacob (Nasyid member's group, Firdaus & Headmaster of INASIS TNB, UUM) - Class of '93
- Dato' SM Azli bin Tan Sri SM Nasimuddin (Executive Director Go Auto Sales, CEO HAVAL Malaysia) - Class of '01
- Nur Syakirin Husnal Az Hari (Celebrity Presenter) - Class of '06
- Hawa Rizwana Redzuan (TV3 Presenter) - Class of '12
- Ahmad Janatul Firdaus bin Datuk Dr Haji Dzulkarnain (Tokoh Pekerja Negara (Eksekutif) 2019) - STPM 1992)
