= Island Oak High School =

Location
- 5814 Banks Road, Duncan, British Columbia; Canada; 48.7819°N 123.728°W

Information
- Principal: Gary Ward
- Grades: 9 to 12
- Website: www.islandoak.org

Island Oak High School is located in Duncan, Vancouver Island, British Columbia, in Canada. It offers Grades 9 to 12. Enrollment is limited to between 30 and 50 students. The current enrollment is around twenty students split into two classes. There is a faculty of thirteen teachers, specialists, administrators, and assistants. In Feb. 2007 the school hosted the BC Waldorf Teachers Conference.

The school has been operated since 1995 by the Steiner Educational Society, a group of parents and community members. It is certified by the Ministry of Education of British Columbia and receives government funding for Independent Schools.

The school is a Developing Member of the Association of Waldorf Schools of North America.

Typically, over half of the Grade 9 students entering the school come from a Waldorf elementary school. Sunrise Waldorf School, a Kindergarten to Grade Eight school also located in the Cowichan Valley, provides many of the students, but is not formally associated with Island Oak High School.

Every year since founding, a number of international students have come to the school in exchange for Island Oak High School students visiting their countries. Approximately 25% of the students are boarding or exchange students. They come from Waldorf Schools in France, Germany, England, Russia, Netherlands, Switzerland, Colombia, Peru, Chile and Australia. Most recently, exchange students have come from Germany, Switzerland, China, Japan and other Asian locations. International students stay for periods ranging from three months to several years. The opportunity to travel to other countries, to study and learn other languages and immerse themselves in other cultures is an attraction for BC and Canadian students of Grade Ten and Eleven. The high school offers many opportunities for students to grow and explore in their learning environment. Island oak typically sees two short-term exchanges per year with varying numbers of students, one at the beginning of the first semester and a second at the beginning of the second semester.

== See also ==
- Alternative education
