= Sandringham High School =

High School in Zimbabwe

Coordinates: 18.08463°S 30.66097°E

Sandringham High School is a Zimbabwean Methodist Church school located 25 km from the town of Norton and 65 km from Harare. It is a mixed school that offers educational services up to Form 6.

== History ==
The Methodist Church in Zimbabwe acquired a farm next to Chibero College of Agriculture in Chivero communal lands, Mhondoro, so it could build a church and school to facilitate the settlement of church members. The school taught primary school and secondary school levels. The campus was hosted multiple buildings, including school blocks, residencies for boys and girls, sports fields, and teacher's accommodations. The secondary school curriculum focused on technical education. Girls were taught home economics, food and nutrition, and fashion and fabrics, while boys were taught construction and agriculture.

O levels were introduced in the 1970s. Enrollment expanded to four classes by the 1980s.

Advanced levels were introduced in the late 1980s under School Principal Mr. Jumo. Subjects offered included science, band, and art.

== Motto ==
"Hard work yields good results."

== T2 era and JC ==
Building home economics with its proximity to Chibero College of Agriculture, with a technical emphasis on good results.

== Extracurriulars ==
The school released a gospel album entitled Dai Waiziva. All songs on this album were composed by the choirmaster Mr. Chimuti. The song "Rumbidzwai" off this album peaked at #1 on the Power FM top 20. The school was inspired to release an album by an Upper Six group of 2007 (Vatendi).

The school offers quizzes, debates, chess, and drama.

Sports include athletics, football, basketball, volleyball, tennis, and softball.
