= Olashore International School =

International boarding school in Iloko-Ijesa, Osun State, Nigeria

- Olashore International School Logo

Location
- Iloko-Ijesa; Nigeria; 7.65336°N 4.81550°E

Information
- Type: Boarding School
- Founder: Oba Oladele Olashore
- Principal: Mr. Guy Cassarchis
- Secondary years taught: Junior and Senior School
- Website: www.olashoreschool.com/home/

Olashore International school is a private co-educational boarding secondary school located in Osun State, Nigeria. The School was founded by the late Oba Olashore in 1994.

The school has been accused of covering up the sexual assault of one of its former students, Obiamaka Chidinma Azubike, by 13 boys in 2004. The school also allegedly protected the alleged perpetrators of the violence. In January 2022, the school announced that a five-man panel had been inaugurated by the school's Board of Trustees to invetigate the incident and concerns but no report for the investigation has been released.

Olashore International School is situated on a 60-hectare campus, approximately three hours from Lagos, Nigeria. The school offers both the Nigerian and British curricula, preparing students for examinations including the Cambridge IGCSE, the West African Senior Secondary Certificate Examination (WASSCE), SAT, JAMB, and IELTS. In 2016, the school became a member of the Council of British International Schools. Students participate in extracurricular activities including sports, performing arts, and the Duke of Edinburgh Award scheme. The school operates an on-site farm where students engage in practical agricultural activities.

== History ==
Olashore International School became operational on January 9, 1994, and started with 100 year 7 students.

The school was founded by Oba Oladele Olashore CON in his hometown of Iloko, Nigeria and named after himself. Together with the founding Principal, Dr. D. F. Burgess they influenced the early years of the school greatly.

== See also ==
- British International School Lagos
