= The Chinese High School Clock Tower Building =

Coordinates: 1°19′35″N 103°48′12.3″E

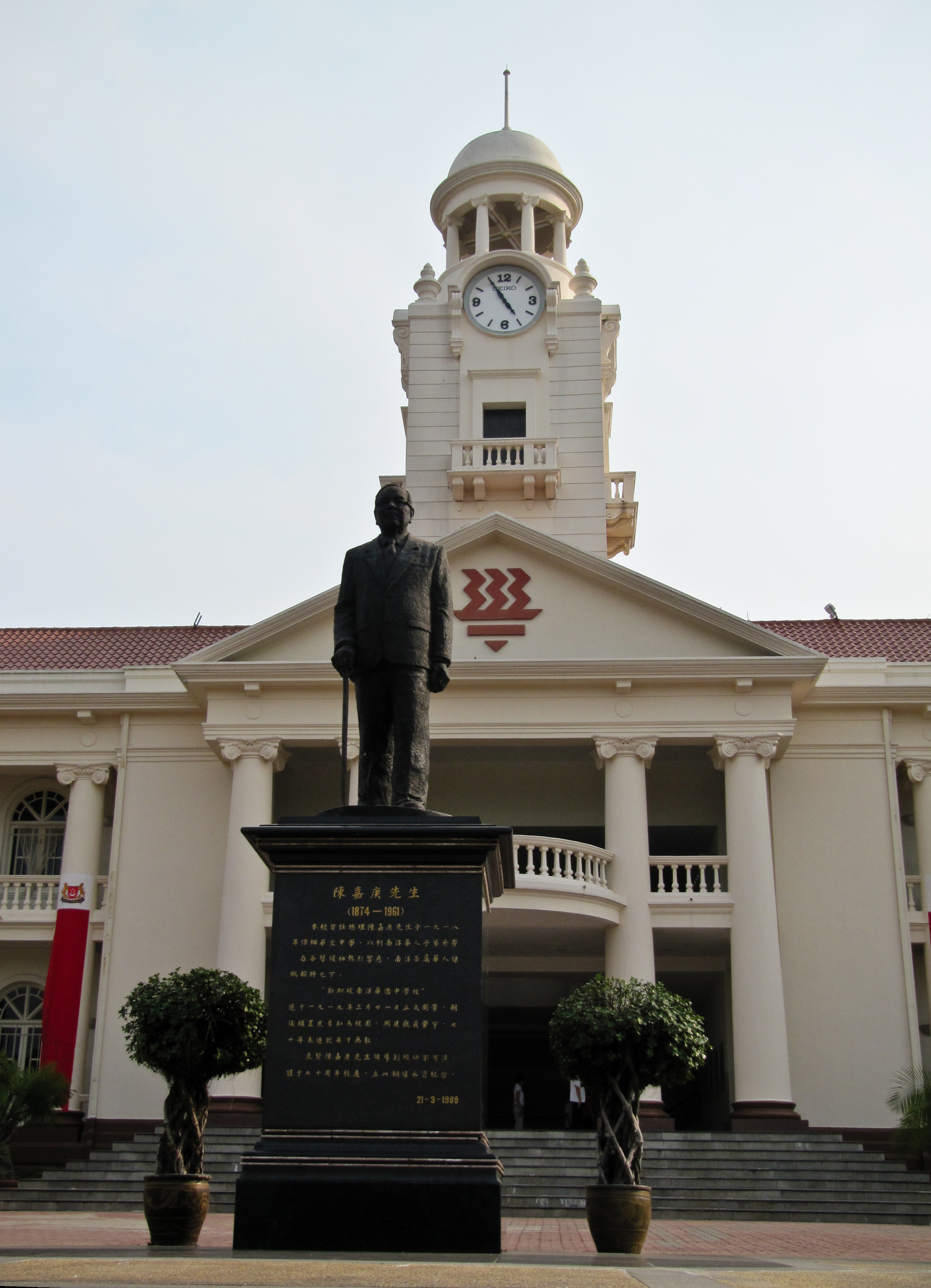
- Hwa Chong Institution Clock Tower Building with a statue of the school's founder, Tan Kah Kee, in the foreground. Pictured in 2009.

- Location within Singapore
- Location: 673 Bukit Timah Road Singapore

History
- Built: 1925

Site notes
- Governing body: National Heritage Board

National monument of Singapore
- Designated: 19 March 1999; 27 years ago
- Reference no.: 43

The Chinese High School Clock Tower Building, a gazetted national monument in Singapore, is situated in the campus of the integrated Hwa Chong Institution, which incorporates The Chinese High School and Hwa Chong Junior College.

Standing at 31 metres tall atop a small knoll on which parts of the campus was built on, the building was completed as part of the campus of The Chinese High School in 1925, funded by generous donations from the Chinese community leaders. It served as an imposing landmark for the Bukit Timah area where it is surrounded by relatively low-rise private housing estates.

It was used in tactical military situations during the Pacific War in World War II. Its strategic location atop a hill gave any troops stationed in it a good view of the island. It was used by the Allied defenders during the Battle of Singapore, as well as during the Japanese Occupation of Singapore, it was occupied by the Imperial Japanese Army for the purpose of surveillance.

The tower's four-faced clock was destroyed and removed during World War II, and was restored in the early 1970s, with replacements donated by Seiko. The clock tower went through a series of restoration and expansion in the 1990s, in which a new library was added.

On 19 March 1999, two days before the 80th anniversary of the school, the clock tower was gazetted as a national monument, to mark the significance of the institution as the first Chinese-medium secondary school to be built in Southeast Asia catering to the Overseas Chinese by its founder, Mr Tan Kah Kee.

== Architecture & Facilities ==
The Clock Tower Building is a work by Swan & Maclaren, a renowned firm that also designed the Sultan Mosque, the Former Tanjong Pagar Railway Station, Civilian War Memorial, and Raffles Hotel. Neoclassical architectural elements, including a symmetrical plan, the frontal triangular pediment, stately Ionic columns, and arched doorways and windows form distinctive traits of the iconic building. The 36-metre-high clock tower and a cupola, supported by eight small Ionic columns, crowns the tower.

The Clock Tower building features eight high roof classrooms catering to the high school section of the institution, previously reserved for the top performing classes. Currently, it serve as venues for students in academic special programmes.

== Gallery ==
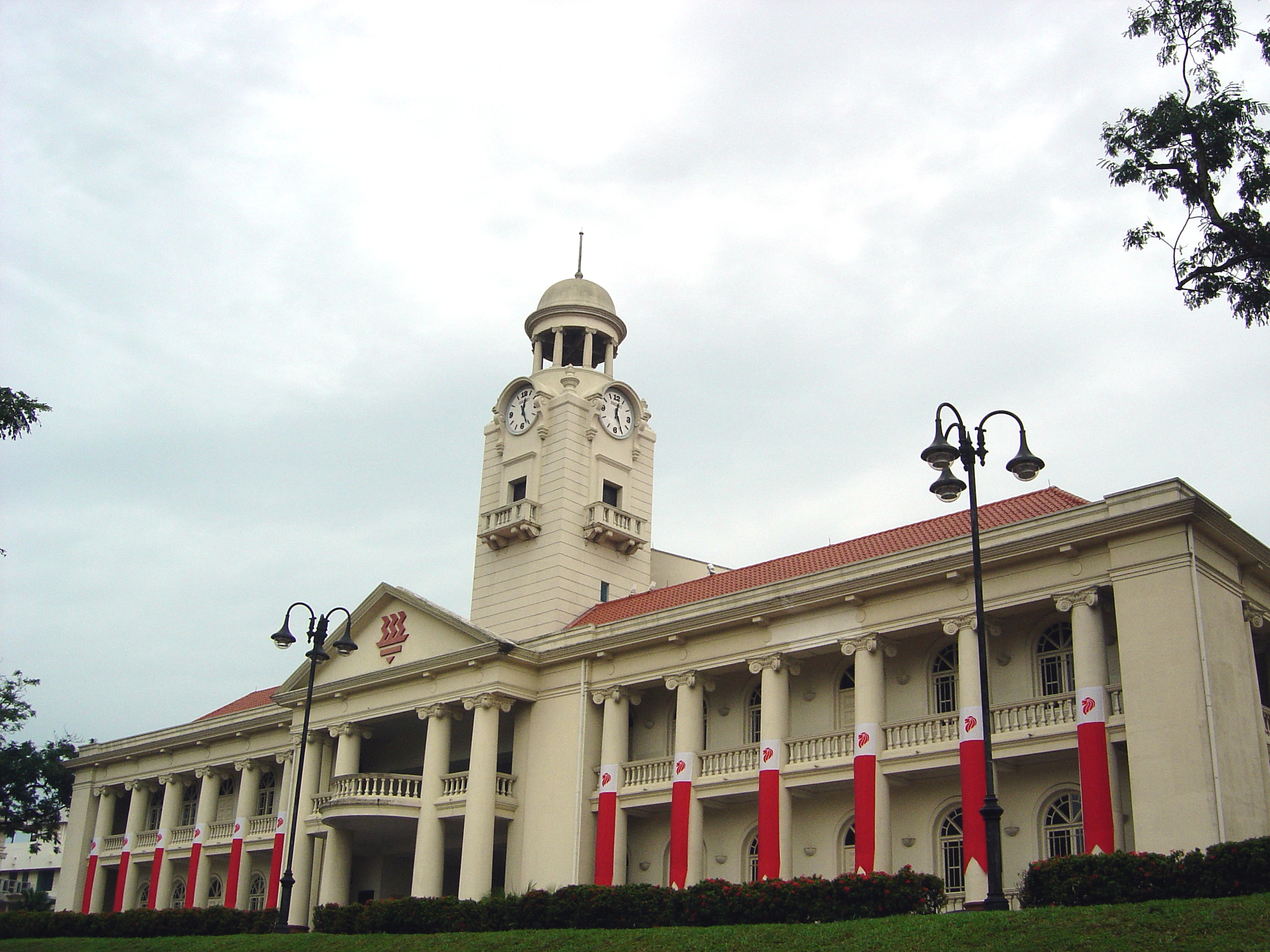
Clock Tower Building

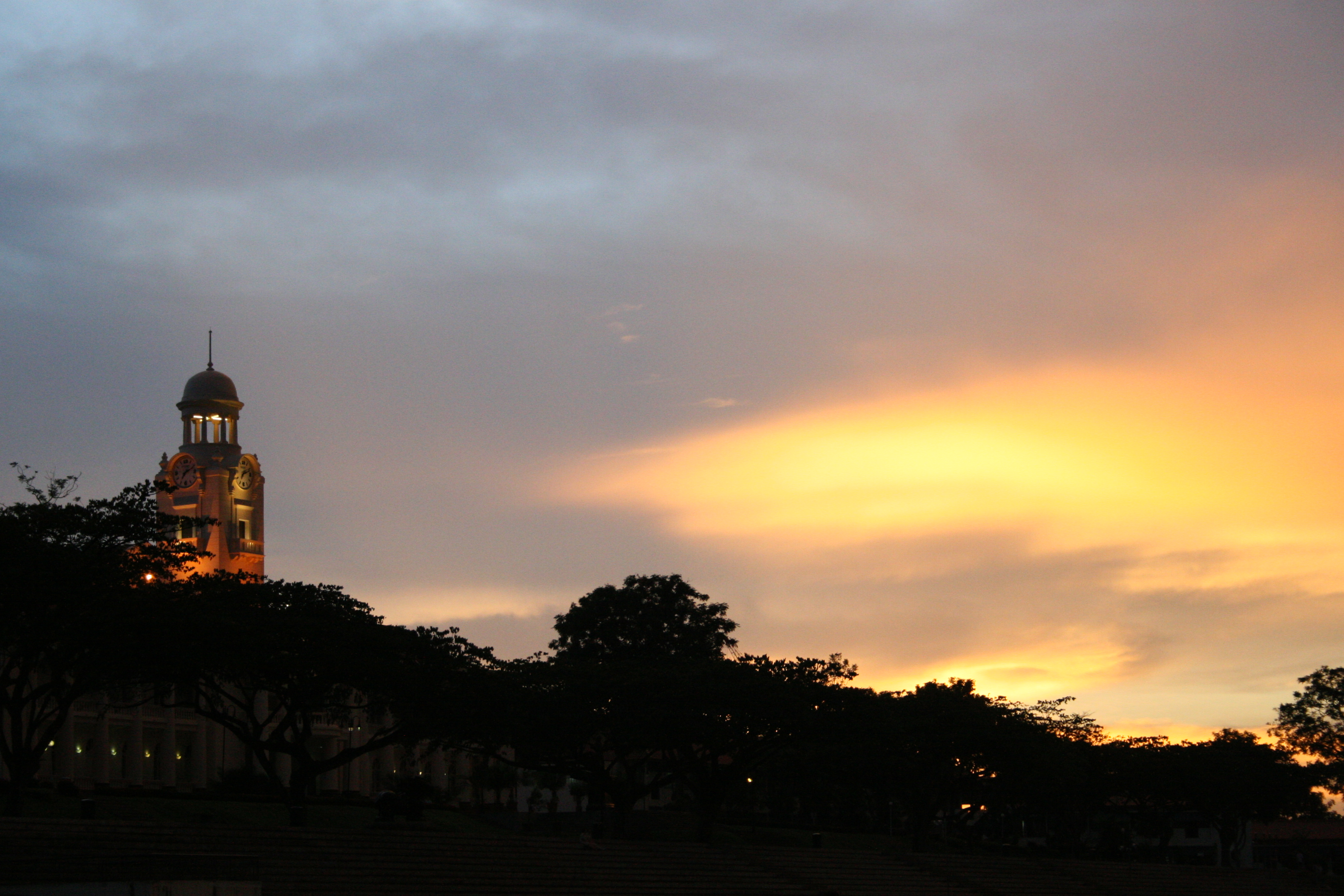
As seen from a distance during sunset
