= Hwa Chong Institution =

Independent School in Central Region, Singapore

- 华侨中学 (Chinese); Institusi Hwa Chong (Malay) ஹ்வா சாங் கல்வி நிலையம் (Tamil)

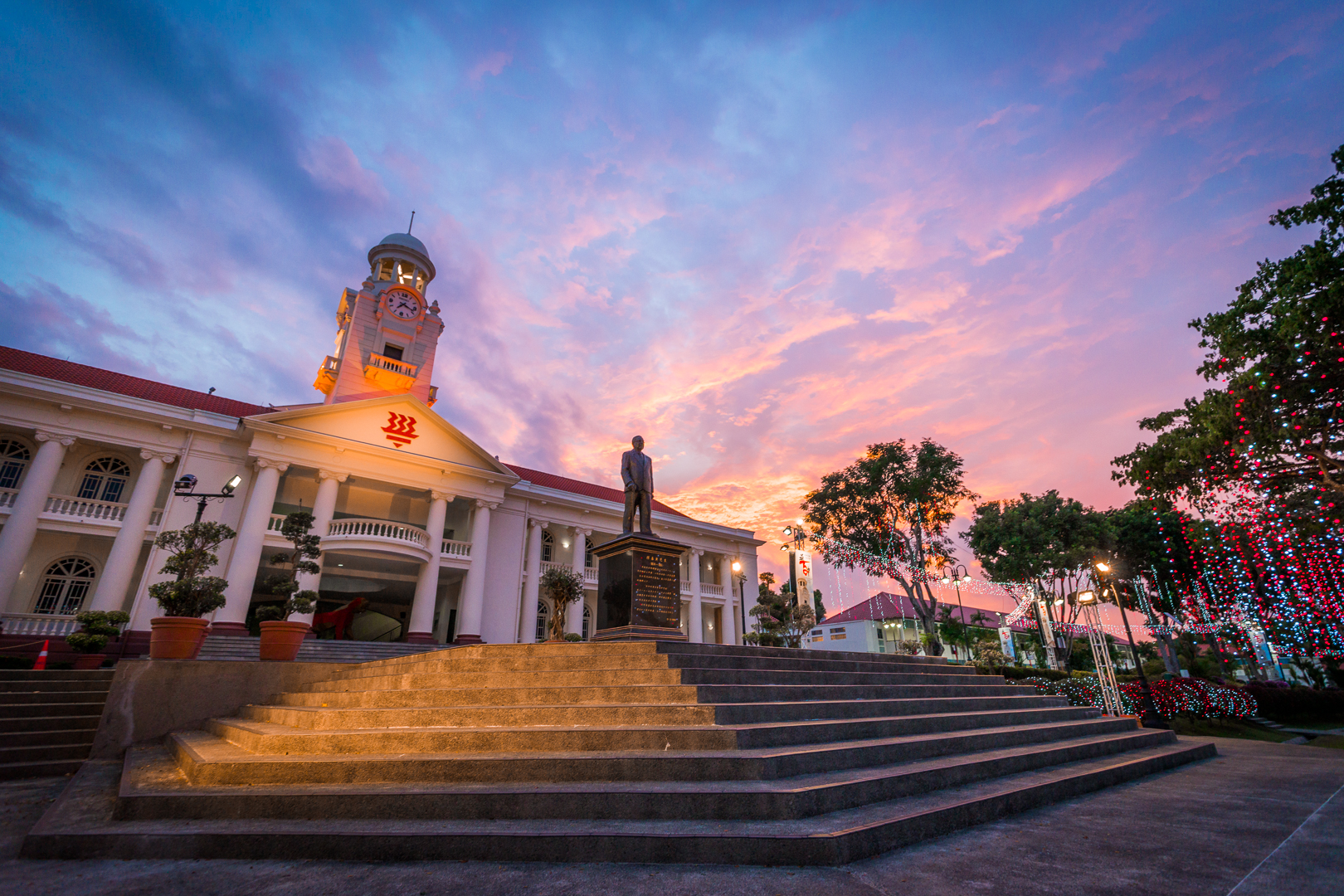

Location
- 661 Bukit Timah Road, Singapore 269734; Bukit Timah; Singapore; 1.326540°N 103.803491°E

Information
- Former names: The Chinese High School (1919–2004); Hwa Chong Junior College (1974–2004)
- School type: Independent; Boys (secondary); Co-educational (junior college)
- Motto: 自强不息 (Tireless self - improvement with tenacity, innovation and passion)
- Established: 1 January 2005; 21 years ago
- Principal: Lee Peck Ping
- Enrollment: ~4000
- Campus size: 29 hectares (0.29 km^{2})
- Campus type: Urban
- Color: Red Yellow White
- Affiliations: Nanyang Girls' High School; Hwa Chong International School; Hwa Chong Institution Boarding School
- Website: hci.edu.sg

Hwa Chong Institution (HCI) is an independent secondary educational institution in Bukit Timah, Central Region, Singapore. It was established in 2005 by the merger of The Chinese High School (1919–2005) and Hwa Chong Junior College (1974–2005).

HCI provides secondary education for boys only from Years 1 to 4, and pre-university education for both boys and girls in Years 5 and 6. Since 2005, HCI and its affiliated school Nanyang Girls' High School have offered a six-year Integrated Programme (IP), which allows students to skip the Singapore-Cambridge GCE Ordinary Level (O-Levels) examinations and proceed to take the Singapore-Cambridge GCE Advanced Level (A-Levels) examinations at the end of Year 6. HCI operates under the Special Assistance Plan (SAP) and offers the IP and the Gifted Education Programme (GEP). Its name "Hwa Chong" ("Hua Zhong" or "华中") is an abbreviation of The Chinese High School's Chinese name, "Hua Qiao Zhong Xue" or "华侨中学".

== History ==
Previously two separate but affiliated schools — The Chinese High School and Hwa Chong Junior College – HCI was established via a merger on 1 January 2005. It was among the first batch of schools to offer the six-year Integrated Programme, which leads directly to the Singapore-Cambridge GCE Advanced Level examinations at the end of the sixth year. In spite of the merger, the High School section remains boys-only. The College section remains co-educational; its Integrated Programme cohort consists of boys from Hwa Chong's High School section as well as girls from Nanyang Girls' High School.

=== The Chinese High School (1919–2004) ===
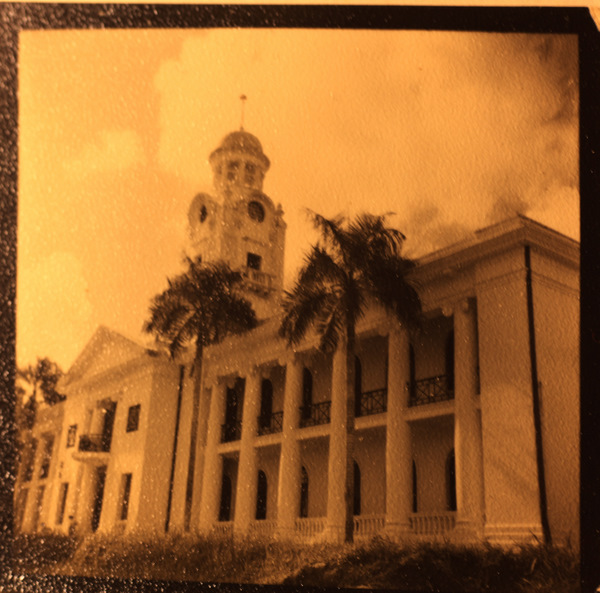
The Chinese High School Clock Tower in the 1950s

The Chinese High School was founded by Tan Kah Kee in March 1919 at Niven Road, as the Singapore Nanyang Overseas Chinese Middle School (traditional Chinese: 新加坡南洋華僑中學; simplified Chinese: 新加坡南洋华侨中学). With an enrolment of 78 pupils, it was the first Chinese institution of higher learning at that time in Southeast Asia, catering to Chinese dialect groups amongst the overseas Chinese. Six years later, the school moved to its Bukit Timah campus.

After its founding, the school offered comprehensive secondary level Chinese education. It remained funded and supported by Tan Kah Kee until shortly before World War II. In 1934, Lee Kong Chian, Tan Kah Kee's son-in-law, became the chairman of the school's board and remained in his post until 1955. During his tenure, the school faced the threat of closure several times due to financial difficulties, but managed to survive due to strong financial support from Lee and Tan. Together, they built a legacy which is currently commemorated by the school body through songs, plays, musical performances, and a heritage trail.

During the Battle of Singapore, the school's clock tower, due to its height, served as a vantage point and surveilance tower for both the Allied forces and Japanese army. Following the war, the school resumed its Chinese education. In the 1950s and 1960s, during periods of civil unrest in Singapore, many students, teachers and alumni participated in or led the anti-colonial riots.

After Singapore gained independence in 1965, the school came under the purview of the Ministry of Education and was accorded the Special Assistance Plan (SAP) status in 1979. Later, in 1988, the school achieved the status of an independent school. This scheme was perceived by the ministry as successful, and was thus extended to other well-performing schools in Singapore. On 19 March 1999, the school's clock tower was gazetted as a national monument.

=== Hwa Chong Junior College (1974–2004) ===
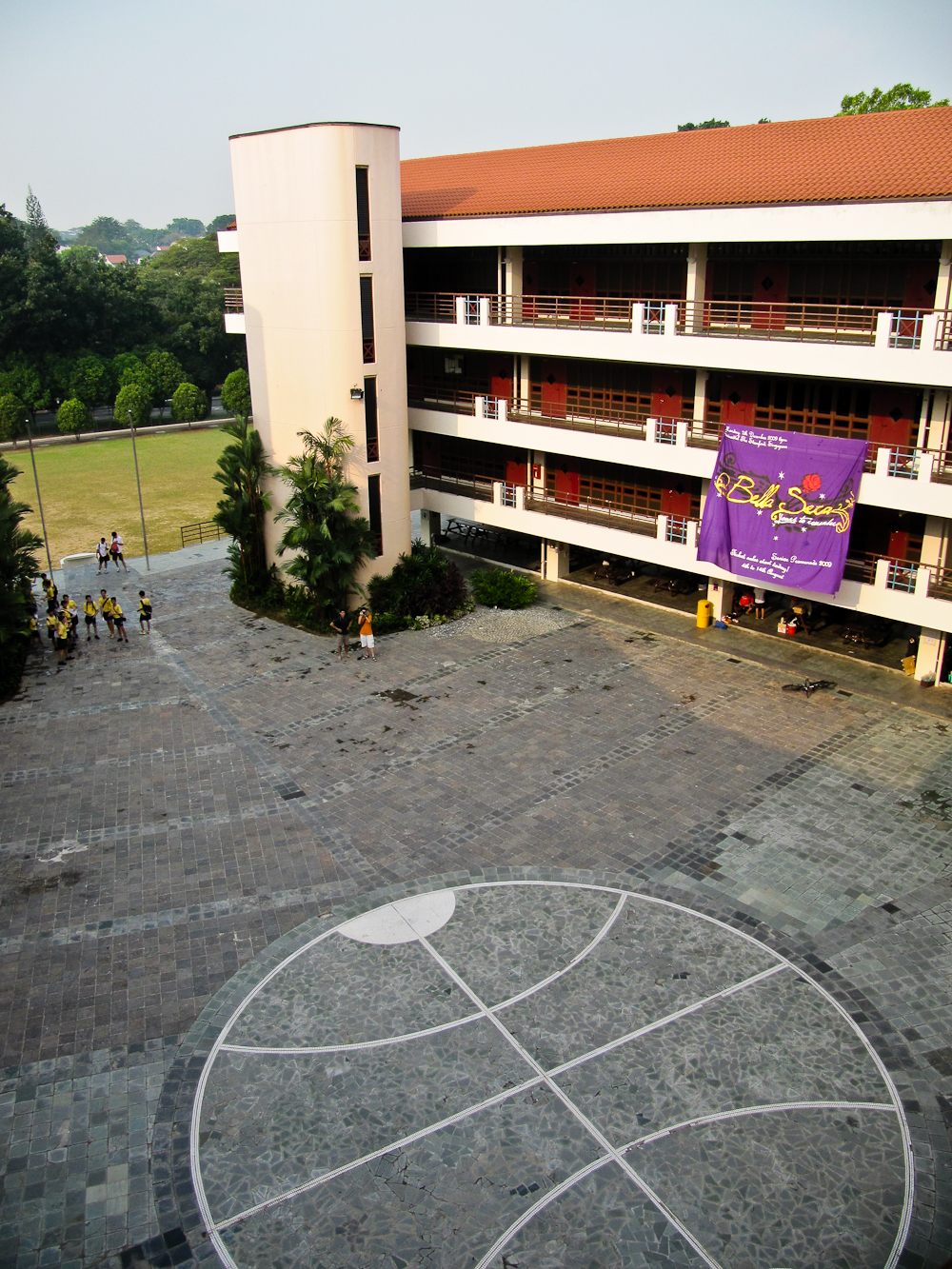
The Central Plaza of the college section, previously a part of Hwa Chong Junior College

In the late 1960s, Singapore's education system for secondary schools was in the form of a four-year programme followed by a two-year programme for pre-university education. The Chinese High School's board of directors decided to construct a junior college immediately adjacent to the school. This junior college was the second to be built in Singapore, and the first government-aided one.

Hwa Chong Junior College began lessons in 1974 under the same administration as The Chinese High School. The name "Hwa Chong" ("Hua Zhong") is an abbreviation of The Chinese High School's Chinese name, "Hua Qiao Zhong Xue", to mark the relationship between the two schools. During its initial thirteen years, Hwa Chong Junior College gradually developed into a top junior college in Singapore, with the school frequently producing high-scoring students in the Singapore-Cambridge GCE Advanced Level examinations.

Hwa Chong Junior College moved out of its campus at Bukit Timah Road in the late 1980s following the discovery of structural problems with the building to facilitate rebuilding. Students were relocated to Ngee Ann Polytechnic initially, before a temporary campus was erected in Bukit Batok. The temporary campus was utilised from 1987 to 1992, as reconstruction works proceeded at the original campus. Lessons restarted at the original campus in 1993.

After The Chinese High School was accorded independent school status in 1987, Hwa Chong Junior College followed suit in 2004, becoming the first junior college in Singapore to be granted the status of an independent school.

=== Merger as Hwa Chong Institution (2005–present) ===
Following the introduction of the Integrated Programme into Singapore's education system in the early 2000s, The Chinese High School merged with Hwa Chong Junior College on 1 January 2005 to form an integrated institution, featuring a High School section and a college section. The merged institution kept the native name of The Chinese High School (華僑中學; 华侨中学), and adopted "Hwa Chong Institution" as its administrative name. The college section is formally renamed as "Hwa Chong Institution (College)" (華僑中學 (高中部); 华侨中学 (高中部)) In the same year, Hwa Chong International School was established under the auspices of the institution, offering independent education that leads to the International Baccalaureate Diploma.

When HCI was formed in 2005, the former Hwa Chong Junior College's principal Ang Wee Hiong became the new principal and chief executive officer of HCI, while Hon Chiew Weng, who was previously the principal of The Chinese High School, became principal of the High School Section and Deputy Chief Executive Officer of HCI.

In 2008, HCI was selected by the Ministry of Education to implement the FutureSchools@Singapore programme, one of five initial schools to do so and amongst the eventual fifteen planned. In the same year, the Hwa Chong Diploma was introduced and has been awarded to the best performing 30% of each year's graduating cohort on top of the Singapore-Cambridge GCE Advanced Level certificate.

After Hon Chiew Weng succeeded Ang Wee Hiong as Principal of HCI in 2009, the role of chief executive officer was abolished. Hon stated that since HCI was a school and not a company, there was no need for a chief executive officer. Hon retired on 22 December 2017, and was succeeded by Pang Choon How, an alumnus of the school who was previously the principal of Chung Cheng High School (Main). On 15 December 2023, he was succeeded by Lee Peck Ping.

==== 100th Anniversary ====
HCI commemorated its centenary on its founder's day, 21 March 2019.

On 21 March 2019, in commemoration of the school's centennial, a dinner dubbed the "dinner of 10,000 people" was organised and held. It was celebrated in the field before the school's iconic clock tower and the statue of Tan Kah Kee, the school's founder. The celebratory dinner entered the Singapore Book of Records as the largest school anniversary dinner, with 12,581 attendees, including Prime Minister Lee Hsien Loong. This was the fifth time Hwa Chong had organised such a celebratory dinner, with prior dinners in 1979, 1989, 1999 and 2009.

The same year, the school staged the Centennial Musical at the National University of Singapore Cultural Centre. The musical featured 537 participants, and was attended by alumna Sim Ann, Senior Minister of State at the Ministry of Communications and Information. The Singapore Symphony Orchestra's Tan Wee-Hsin was the conductor, while Yang Wenzhong was the director at-large with the orchestra comprising HCI students.

== School identity and culture ==
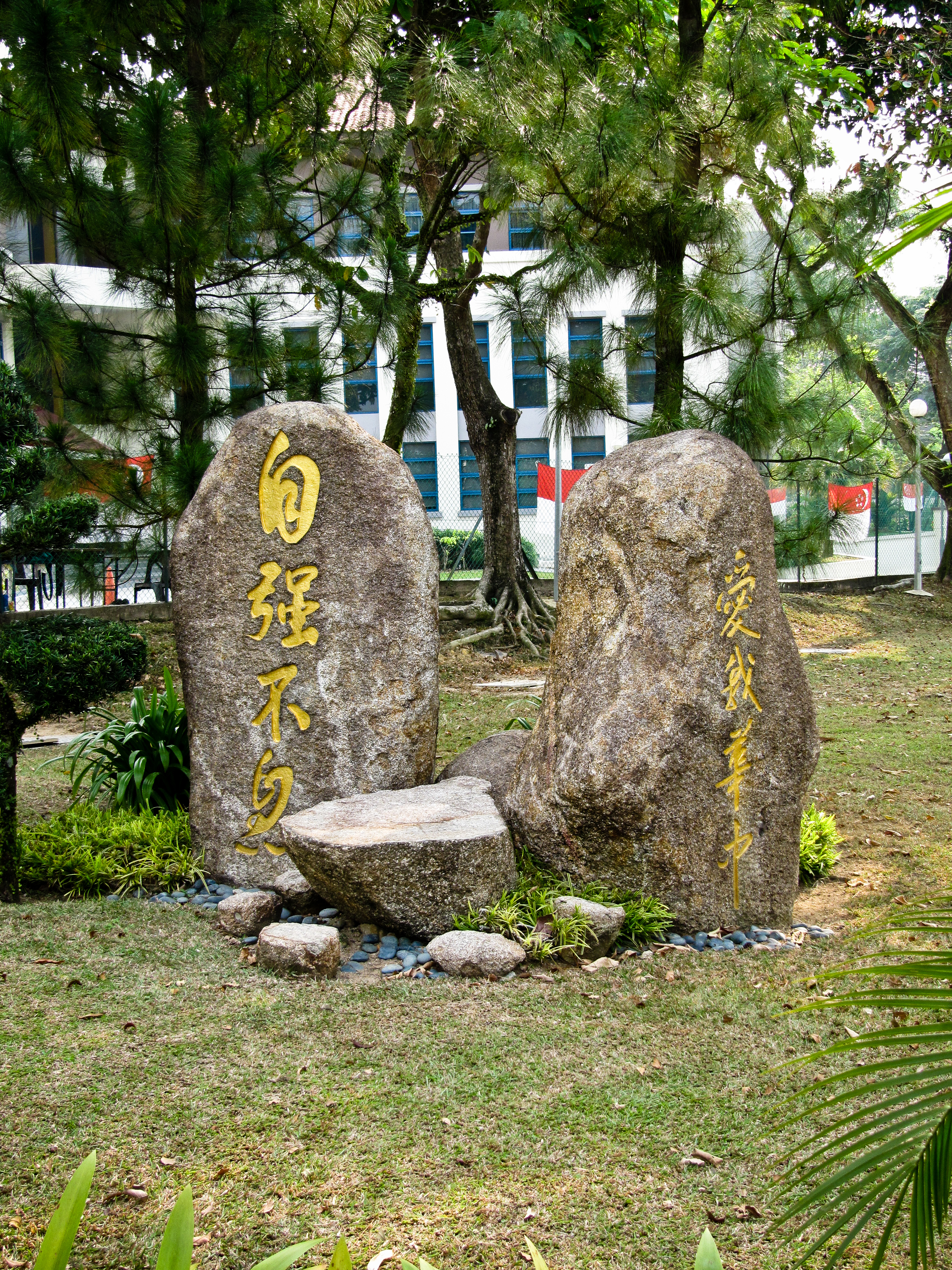
A stone tablet with the school motto inscribed

=== Uniform and attire ===
In the High School Section, students in Secondary 1 to Secondary 3 (inclusive) wear a white short-sleeved shirt with khaki short trousers and white socks, which must cover the ankles. The four metal buttons must be worn on the two front pockets and on both shoulders. The school collar pin should be worn on the left collar. Either white, blue or black shoes with either white or black laces must be worn. Secondary 4 students wear beige long trousers with a beige shirt, similar to the boys in the College Section. College girls wear a beige blouse and a beige skirt. The uniform for the College Section is the same as that of the former Hwa Chong Junior College, and it was designed by a Malay girl of the pioneer batch.

=== Discipline ===
Students earn demerit points for poor behaviour. Accumulated demerit points can affect final grades and eligibility for certain awards, scholarships and overseas trips. The student handbook for the High School Section states that students who commit serious offences may be punished with detention, caning, suspension, or expulsion. Only the principal or discipline master may administer caning. Students found smoking are immediately caned or suspended or both. Caning may also be given for integrity-related offences (e.g. cheating), uncivilised behaviour (e.g. defiance), and criminal offences (e.g. fighting).

=== Crest ===
The current school crest of HCI is a stylised form of the traditional Chinese character Huá (華), which is part of the school name and reflects its Chinese heritage. The red crest also bears much similarity to a burning torch of passion.

== Affiliations ==
=== Nanyang Girls' High School ===
HCI offers the six-year Integrated Programme with its affiliated school Nanyang Girls' High School (NYGH), which is known as the Hwa Chong Affiliate Programme. Under the programme, NYGH students and HCI High School students proceed to the HCI College Section for their pre-university education in Years 5 and 6, and sit for the Singapore-Cambridge GCE Advanced Level examinations at the end of Year 6. However, HCI High School and NYGH students who have not achieved a Mean Subject Grade (MSG) of 3.00 or below at the end of Year 4, or who have applied to leave the Integrated Programme, do not proceed to the HCI College Section for Years 5 and 6.

=== Hwa Chong family of schools ===
Under the umbrella Hwa Chong family of schools, HCI is affiliated to Hwa Chong International School (HCIS) and Hwa Chong Institution Boarding School (HCIBS). All three schools share the same prefix in their names, and are located in the same main campus. However, in spite of the multi-sharing, each school possesses its own set of facilities, though students from the different schools may access and use the facilities in other schools.

HCIS is a co-educational, private independent international school offering a six-year programme from Grade 7 (11–13 years old) to Grade 12 that leads to the International Baccalaureate (IB) Diploma. In the interim years, the students will sit for the International General Certificate of Secondary Education (IGCSE). HCIS saw its final batch of graduating IGCSE students and the first batch of graduating IB students in 2010.

HCIBS is the institution's boarding school, accommodating HCI's international scholars. It also houses international scholars studying in other local schools such as Singapore Chinese Girls' School and Bukit Panjang Government High School. Local Singaporean boarders staying in the boarding school are participants of HCI's Integrated Boarding Programme. The boarding complex was designed by architect Kenzo Tange, consisting of seven six-storey halls providing accommodation for up to 1,000 boarders or guests.

== Campus ==
The main campus of HCI in Bukit Timah covers 72 acres, making it one of the largest campuses in Southeast Asia. The campus land is shared among the Hwa Chong family of schools, which also include Hwa Chong International School and Hwa Chong Institution Boarding School. Also onsite is the Bukit Timah campus of the Singapore University of Social Sciences and its administrative headquarters. Despite the multi-sharing, each entity possesses its own set of facilities, marked by certain perimeters. The school also has a national monument in its campus.

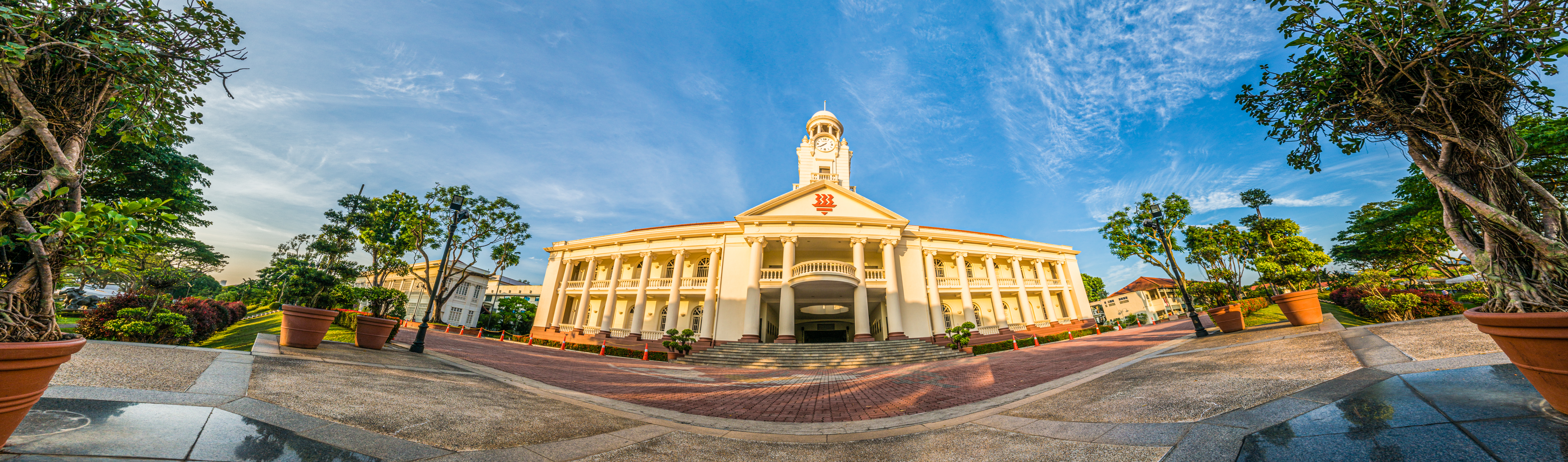
A panoramic view of the clock tower and its surroundings.

=== Main campus ===
==== Clock tower ====
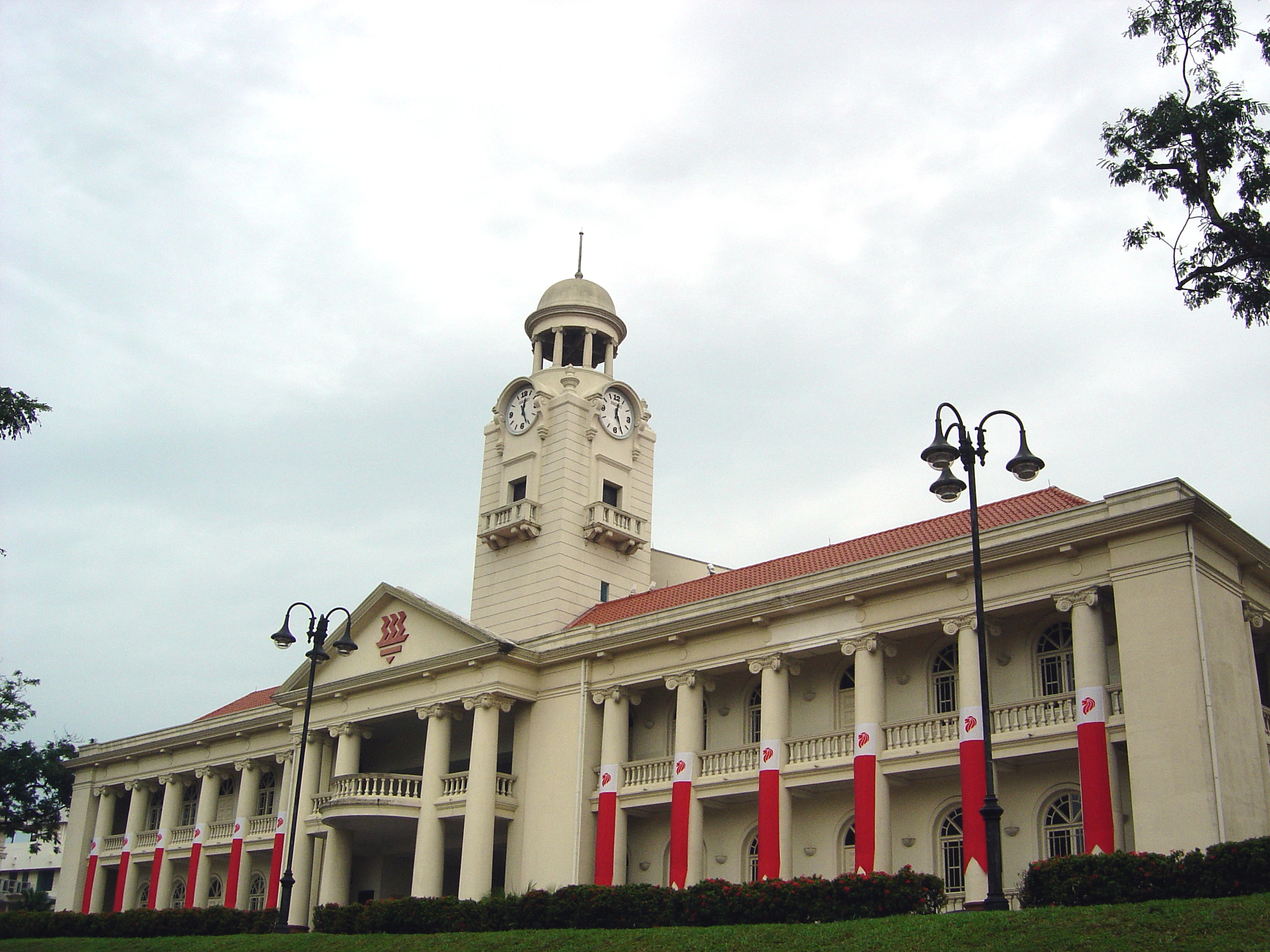
Clock tower of Hwa Chong Institution

The 31-metre tall clock tower of the school is a national monument. It is the only school in Singapore to have a national monument in its campus. It is built in the neoclassical architectural style. It was built in 1925 by Swan & Maclaren and was funded by donations of the Chinese community. The clock tower was gazetted as a national monument in 1999. The classrooms in the building which holds the clock tower is used for special programmes.

==== Library ====
There are two libraries in the campus, the Jing Xian Library in the college section and the Kong Chian Library in the High School section respectively. The Jing Xian library was founded in 1974, and was renamed in 1983 in honour of the father of the chairman of the management committee. The Kong Chian Library officially opened as the Kuo Chuan Library in 1957, but was later renamed in honour of Lee Kong Chian in 1967.

==== Scholastic Renaissance Center ====
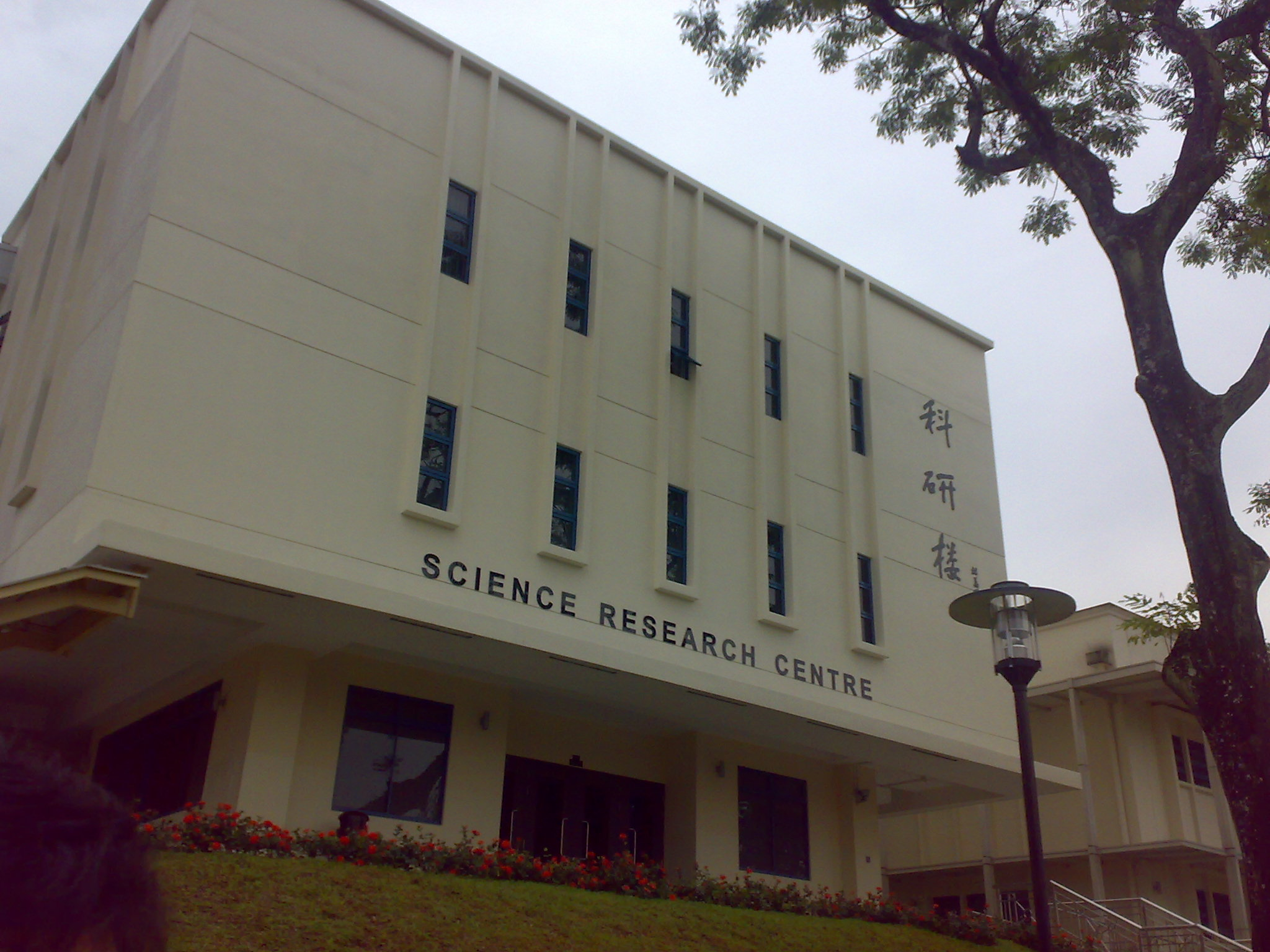
Hwa Chong Institution Science Research Centre

The Science Research Centre, built in 2008, has ten purpose-built laboratories in which students experience different research disciplines outside of the usual curriculum, including labs for Robotics and Engineering, Biotechnology and Microbiology, and the Pharmaceutical Sciences. It was renamed from the Science Research Center in 2026, as the block also houses art rooms and classes The centre provides resources to support the research and innovation programmes, serving as a central facility for student research activities.

==== Ong Teng Cheong SALT Centre ====
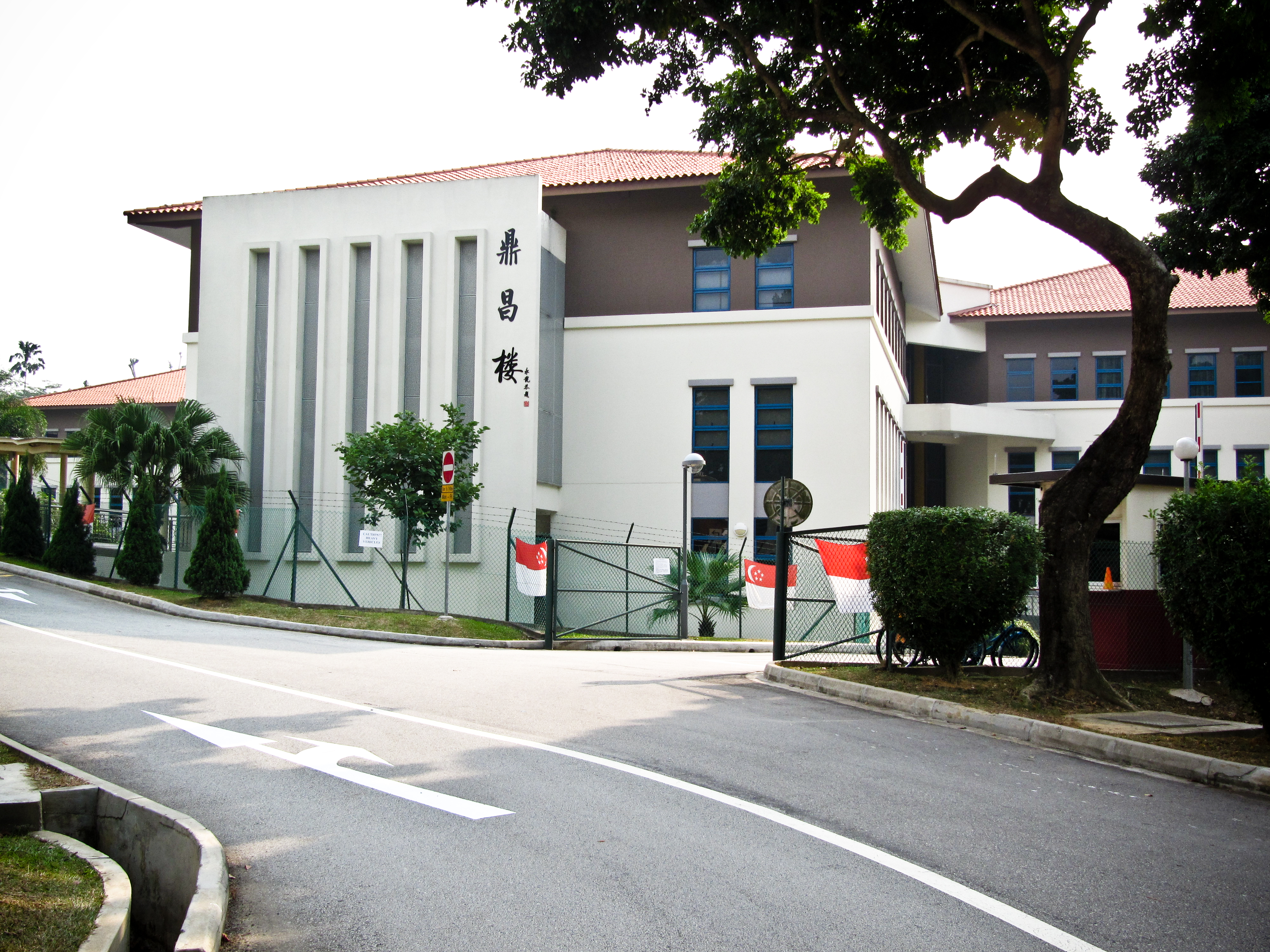
Hwa Chong Institution SALT Centre

The Ong Teng Cheong Student Activities and Leadership Training Centre (also called the Ong Teng Cheong SALT Centre, or the SALT Centre), named in honour of alumnus Ong Teng Cheong, the fifth President of Singapore, aims to develop students holistically, particularly in arts and leadership development. Housed in it are dance studios, music rooms, and a cardiovascular and weight-training room. The centre also houses a moot parliament hall modelled on the Singapore Parliamentary Chamber. The venue is used for events such as student council meetings, co-curricular activities, lectures by guests speakers, and Model United Nations conferences such as the Hwa Chong Model ASEAN Summit and The Hague International Model United Nations conference.

Other facilities in Hwa Chong Institution include a table tennis room, street soccer courts, a judo dojo, three-storey library, a makerspace, a gymnasium, a 400-metre track, a multi-purpose hall, a multi-storey carpark, lecture theatres, general laboratories, a gym and classrooms.

=== Overseas campuses ===
==== Beijing Satellite Campus ====
In line with the school's plan to set up a Global Academy, HCI established its Beijing Satellite Campus in 2007, the first of its kind for a Singapore school. An agreement was inked with The Second High School Attached to Beijing Normal University, in which classrooms will be leased. A total of four batches of students make their way to the campus every year, staying for up to two months. Priority is given to scholars of HCI's Bicultural Studies Programme and Humanities Programme. Students in the campus take lessons together with students from China in partner schools, carry out community involvement activities, and take field trips to cities such as Xi'an, Tianjin and Shanghai.

HCI has been quoted as saying that it is looking to opening satellite campuses in India and the United States, with the aim of establishing the two in the near future. In July 2010, it was announced that HCI would be developing a school in the Sino-Singapore Guangzhou Knowledge City in Guangzhou, akin to that of its first satellite campus, following the inking of a memorandum of understanding. This would see HCI partnering a top local school for exchange and mutual learning programmes.

In 2021, the Guangzhou SCA school was established.

== Information ==
Secondary 1 boys first enter the High School Section and study there for four years before proceeding to the College Section, where they prepare to take the Singapore-Cambridge GCE Advanced Level examinations at the end of Year 6. The High School Section uses the Mean Subject Grade (MSG) grading system in tests and exams. The school-wide Integrated Programme offered enables students to skip the Singapore-Cambridge GCE Ordinary Level examinations, which is typically taken by Secondary 4 students in Singapore. This is with the exception of the Higher Chinese Language O levels. The Hwa Chong Diploma was introduced in 2008 and is awarded to the best performing 30% of its graduating cohort. It is awarded on top of the GCE Advanced Level certificate, and is an added qualification to university applications.

The school enrols an estimated 4,000 students, spread across the six levels, with a student-teacher ratio of 13:1. Hwa Chong Institution has produced 58 President's Scholars. The college section's Humanities Programme has a significant percentage of its students going on to study abroad at places such as the University of Oxford, University of Cambridge, Harvard University, Yale University, Stanford University, University of Chicago, NYU, UC Berkeley, Peking University and Tsinghua University.

=== Consortia and faculties ===
Students in the High School Section are divided into what are called consortia – a different naming convention from the typical house system. The four consortia in the school are Aphelion, iSpark, Ortus and ProEd. The iSpark consortium houses HCI's School Based Gifted Education Programme (SBGE) students. From 2025 onwards, future batches will no longer be differentiated by SBGE across consortiums, and will have 3 iSpark classes instead of the previous 4. The consortia work closely with one another and each has its own student council. In the College Section, the student population is divided into four faculties – Apollo (God of the Sun), Ares (God of War), Athena (Goddess of Wisdom) and Artemis (Goddess of the Hunt) – named after Greek deities. Similar to the high school section, each faculty is governed by a faculty committee which serves the student body.

=== Special programmes ===
Various special programmes are offered in HCI, such as the Bicultural Studies Programme, the Art Elective Programme and the Science and Math Talent Programme. These programmes offer a degree of specialisation that is generally not possible in the standard curriculum, enabling students in the school to explore respective fields to a greater degree. Despite having similar names, the special programmes offered in the High School and College sections are different; however, most are closely associated with each other. An example would be the Humanities Programme (HP), in which the high school HP focuses on the three core humanities subjects – History, Geography and English Literature, while the college HP offers a greater variety of subjects such as China studies and economics while gearing students for university humanities programmes locally and abroad.

Special programmes offered in the school are as follows:

- Bicultural Studies Programme (BSP)
- Computing Talent Programme (CTP)
- Language Elective Programme (LEP)
- Science and Math Talent Programme (SMTP)
- Humanities Programme (HP)
- Art Elective Programme (AEP)
- Malay Special Programme (MSP)
- Research Studies
- School-based Gifted Plus Programme
- Gifted And Talented Education Programme (GATE)
- Structured Integrated Programme (SIP-for students who are not faring well in their studies)

In 2008, the Centre for Scholastic Education (CSE) was set up to house all special programmes in the High School Section except for the AEP and the MSP. They are the BSP, HP and SMTP. From 2013 onwards, all students participating in Special Programmes are housed under CSE, part of the iSpark Consortium. The Integrated Programme-Special Programme (IPSP) has been abolished in the same year. CSE also used to house the now-defunct Entrepreneurship Programme. CSE is an umbrella term to describe the specialised academic programmes offered at the upper secondary level.

HCI's AEP students have consistently attained awards such as the UOB Painting of the Year Award, and scholarships from the Media Development Authority, National Arts Council, Urban Redevelopment Authority and Ministry of Education to further their studies within creative fields.

In 2013, the Special Science and Maths Talent programme (SSMT) was introduced to the SMTP curriculum to train talented students in areas such as physics and biology.

Sexuality and relationship education programmes are also conducted.

== School information systems ==
=== Integrated e-Message Board (iEMB) ===
The Integrated e-Message Board (iEMB) serves as Hwa Chong Institution's official platform for disseminating school-wide announcements and notices. All students, parents, and staff are instructed to check their iEMB daily for important updates. The iEMB platform supports modern web browsers including Internet Explorer, Firefox, and Google Chrome. However, as of January 2026, it is no longer being used by students.

=== Intelligent School Portal (ISP) ===
The Intelligent School Portal (ISP) functions as HCI's centralized administrative and academic gateway for students, staff, and parents. Users can access account settings, manage personal information, view examination results, register for co-curricular activities (CCAs), and submit out-of-campus requests.

Login credentials for the ISP are identical to those used for iEMB, allowing seamless access across platforms. The ISP is essential for daily school operations and communication among all user groups. From 2025, ISP has been changed to login with Google

== Sabbatical Programme ==
Under HCI's Integrated Programme, the Sabbatical Programme is offered whereby students from Secondary 1 to 4 go on one-week sabbatical courses in each term in the first semester (Terms 1 and 2). The programme is unique in allowing the majority of the school populace to put aside formal curricular lessons for a week in pursuit of their passions or interests, though some students are required to attend certain courses by their teachers' discretion. Sabbaticals offered are of a wide variety, in categories as defined by the school: Arts & Aesthetics, Chinese Studies, Humanities, English & Literature, Leadership, Technology, Science and Math, Camps and Student Exchange; they are essentially courses for students to opt for, such as beginner guitar and songwriting lessons, professional music production, Model United Nations training camps, football friendlies with other schools, etc. Also, the school requires students to use the specifically designed Online Bidding System – the i-ComP – to organise their sabbatical plans. Students who accumulate demerit points as a result of various offences are penalised in their sabbatical bidding or are recommended for corrective work order.

== Co-curricular activities ==
HCI offers a wide variety of extra-curricular activities called co-curricular activities (CCAs) by the Ministry of Education, and this is in part due to the school's large student population and size. It offers more than 30 CCAs.

=== Sports ===
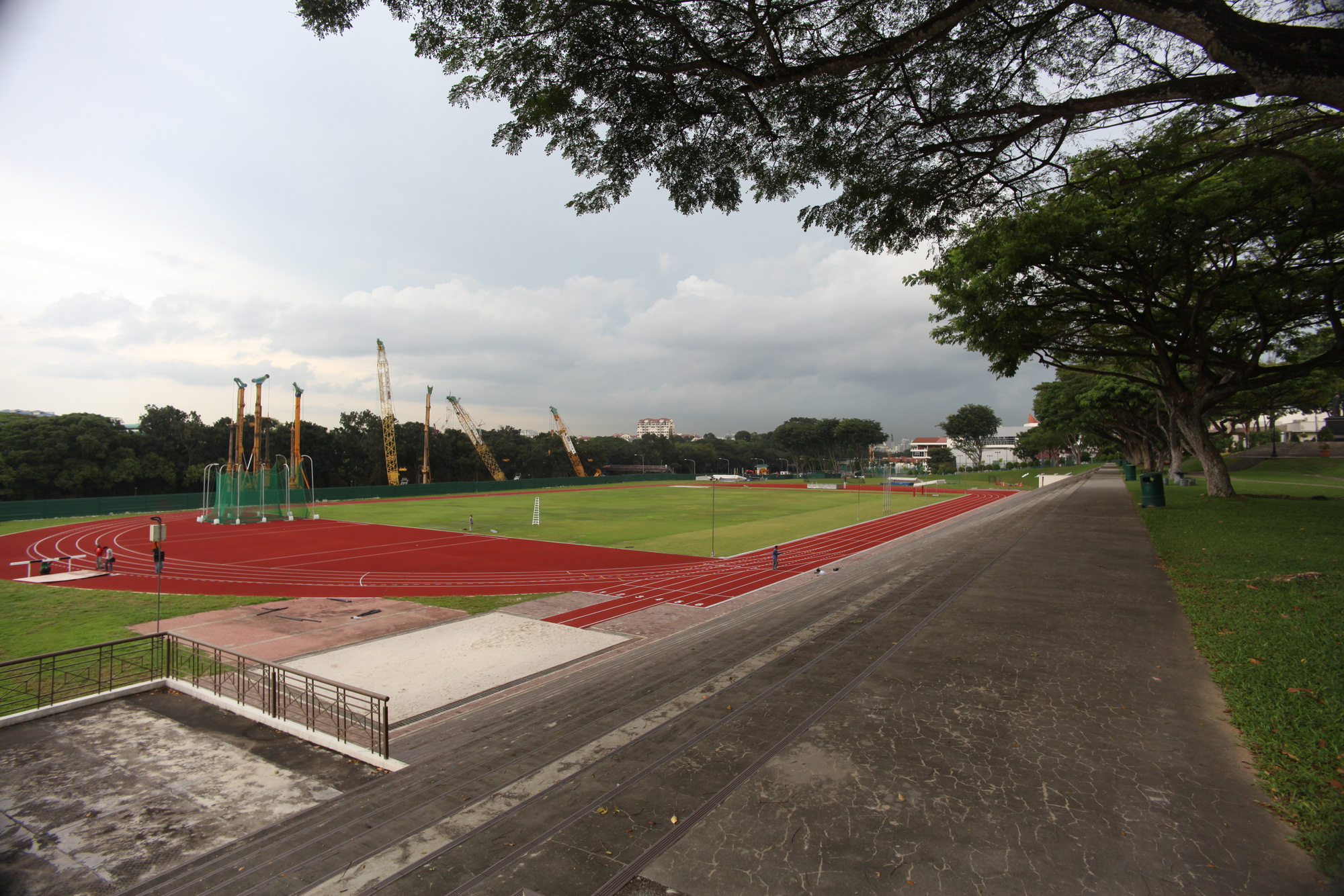
The school track and field

Hwa Chong Institution offers a variety of sports Co-Curricular Activities (CCAs), including soccer, ten-pin bowling, wushu, and touch rugby. The school's fencing, canoeing, gymnastics, judo, shooting, table tennis, and track and field teams have consistently participated in national competitions. The track and field team has held national records in pole vault and has won championships in several divisions. Other teams, including basketball, taekwondo, volleyball, water polo, and wushu, have also participated in various competitions, with notable achievements. For example, in 2010, the volleyball team won the championship in both the Boys' and Girls' A divisions. Nine students from Hwa Chong Institution were selected to represent Singapore in the 2010 Summer Youth Olympics, two of whom were from the championship-winning basketball team.

=== Uniformed groups ===
Hwa Chong Institution currently offers four uniformed groups: the National Cadet Corps (Land), National Police Cadet Corps, St John Brigade, and Scouts (and Ventures & Rovers). These CCAs operate with a structured organization and hierarchy. The Hwa Chong National Cadet Corps (HCINCC) has received the Gold award for 15 consecutive years and won the Best Unit Competition (BUC) in 2000. It is also recognized as a Centre of Excellence for Precision Drill among all NCC units in Singapore. The National Police Cadet Corps (NPCC) is the largest uniformed group in HCI and has achieved 25 consecutive Gold awards in the Unit Overall Proficiency Award (UOPA) as of 2022. The unit has also received The NPCC Golden Cane in recognition of their achievement. The St John Brigade has earned Gold in the Corps Achievement Award for 20 consecutive years. The Scouts unit includes the Bugle Band and Lion Dance troupe, which perform at special events. All four uniformed groups have achieved Gold in the annual national assessment. In addition to regular training, the units also participate in inter-unit competitions such as bowling and captain's ball.

=== Performing arts ===
In 2010, Hwa Chong Institution offered eleven performing arts groups, including the Chinese Orchestra, String Orchestra, Piano Ensemble, Chinese Drama Club, Harmonica Ensemble, English Drama Club, Choir, Music and Dance Society, Guitar Ensemble, Band, and Chinese Dance. By 2023, the number of active performing arts groups had decreased to six: Chinese Orchestra, String Orchestra, Chinese Drama, English Drama, Choir, and Band. In the 2010 Singapore Youth Festival, the English Drama Club received a Silver Award.

In addition to occasional performances held locally at venues such as Victoria Theatre and the school's Drama Centre, many of Hwa Chong Institution's performing arts groups also travel overseas for exchanges and performances. The High School Band, Choir, Chinese Orchestra, and String Orchestra have participated in various international events. In 2010, the College Choir achieved notable results at the Festival of Songs in Olomouc, Czech Republic. In 2011, the Choir received a Gold with Honours in the Singapore Youth Festival Central Judging of Choirs. The Chinese Orchestra has performed in China, Malaysia, and Australia, and was part of the Singapore Youth Festival closing ceremonies in 2005 and 2009. From 2013 to 2023, the Chinese Orchestra received Distinction in the Singapore Youth Festival Central Judging for Chinese Orchestras, with the exception of 2019, when it earned an accomplishment award. Prior to this, from 1993 to 2011, the Orchestra consistently received Gold, the highest award at that time. The High School Band has performed at the Istana and participated in the Pacific Basin Music Festival in Hawaii in 2010, where it earned a Gold award. The Band has also performed at the National Day Parade. The High School String Orchestra, also known as HCISO, has toured internationally, including performing at the 2006 Gothenburg International Music Festival, where it earned first runners-up in the open category. HCISO also toured with the Australian Boys Choir to Melbourne and Johor Bahru for the 7th JB Arts Festival. More recently, HCISO received Distinction at the 2023 Singapore Youth Festival. In 2012, HCISO was one of six schools and the only one in Asia invited to participate in the Los Angeles International Music Festival at the Walt Disney Concert Hall.

== Outreach programmes ==
HCI organises academic competitions and conferences, both for its students and external participants. The school organises the Asia Pacific Mathematical Olympiad for Primary Schools (APMOPS) and the Singapore Mathematical Olympiad for Primary Schools (SMOPS). The International Science Youth Forum (ISYF) is hosted at HCI and co-organised by Nanyang Technological University, Institute of Advanced Studies (IAS), bringing students from across Asia-Pacific together to network and dialogue, with Nobel laureates coming down to share their experiences in the scientific field; a record five Nobel laureates were involved in 2010.

== Controversies ==
=== 2020 Singaporean general election ===
In 2020, an email from the school administration advising students not to "discuss matters" regarding the 2020 Singaporean general election sparked controversy and debate. It was sent on the school's Integrated e-Message Board to College Section students, advising them to avoid posting anything related to the general election on social media platforms associated with the school, as well as the students' own social media accounts. A screenshot of the message was leaked and circulated online, stirring debate on topics such as free speech, political opinions and whether youths should be free to engage in political discussions.

The incident led to a backlash in which a group of alumni, led by filmmaker Anthony Chen, sent a letter to the school administration to express their disappointment. HCI defended its advice to students in a statement saying, "Our intention is not to silence students' voices, nor to curb their interest in national issues. Instead, we encourage our students to engage actively in discussions and even debates on national issues, in a safe environment." The school refused to comment if disciplinary action had been taken against students who had raised concerns.

=== Homophobic sex education ===
On 13 July 2022, a school counsellor at the institution gave a talk to secondary 4 students using false content that many deemed to be homophobic. According to reports, amongst the content shown to students was "What are LBGT so proud of?" followed by a list: "58% of homosexuals have problems with intestinal worms", "23% of children with lesbian parents have been sexually abused", "78% of homosexuals have STDs" and "1 in 15 homosexuals is a pedophile". Photos of the presentation quickly went viral and was reported by local press and by rights groups in Singapore.

Following the backlash, Hwa Chong released a statement saying that the presentation was based on the individual staff's personal perspectives and not of the school or MOE. The school also promised a review of the processes. The school initially suspended the counsellor from giving further sexuality education presentations. On 2 August 2022, however, Minister for Education Chan Chun Sing revealed in a written reply to a question in Parliament that the school had suspended the counsellor from all duties, pending further investigations.

Organizations like Pinkdot have condemned the message and Hwa Chong's response to the incident, saying, "To chalk this incident up to the actions of one rogue counsellor ignores systemic issues of inadequate sexuality education.".

=== Criticism of hybrid canteen model ===
In early January 2026, the institution faced public criticism following the launch of a new hybrid canteen model operated in partnership with airline caterer SATS Ltd. The model, introduced at the start of the academic year on 2 January 2026, allows students and staff to pre-order bento meals prepared off-site by SATS through an app, alongside food from a reduced number of on-site live stalls. The school said the change was meant to address long queue times during recess and challenges faced by independently run food stalls in maintaining affordable prices amid rising costs.

The commissioning of SATS meals sparked controversy after photos of the pre-packed bento meals were shared widely on social media, notably on Reddit, prompting netizens to liken them to "prison food" or cookhouse meals in the military and question their appeal, nutritional balance and value for money. Some commenters and students claimed the portion sizes were insufficient, meals were blander or carbohydrate-heavy, and quality did not justify the prices compared to traditional canteen options. A petition urging the school to reconsider the SATS central kitchen arrangement garnered significant signatures, which highlighted concerns about nutrition, cost, and reduced choice for students.

In response, HCI acknowledged the concerns and stated that circulating images "did not accurately reflect the typical food offerings or portion standards"; meals were designed by certified nutritionists and complied with MOE and Health Promotion Board (HPB) guidelines. The school also emphasised ongoing efforts to monitor meal quality and gather feedback from students and parents, including sampling sessions and the planned establishment of a canteen review committee to assess food quality, pricing, and variety in collaboration with SATS.

Student opinions was mixed: while some defended the new options as "edible" and convenient, others said they preferred freshly cooked canteen food, leading to longer queues at live stalls. A few students reported choosing alternatives rather than the pre-ordered bentos after initial trials.

== Notable alumni ==
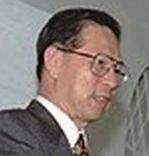
Ong Teng Cheong

HCI and its predecessor schools, The Chinese High School and Hwa Chong Junior College, have a wide alumni base extending to various sectors and industries in Singapore and other countries. One of the school's alumni is Pang Choon How, the previous principal of the school. Its best-known alumnus is probably Ong Teng Cheong, the fifth President of Singapore, who graduated from The Chinese High School in 1955.

Other prominent alumni include politicians such as Jek Yeun Thong, Grace Fu, Chee Hong Tat, Ng Chee Meng, Lee Yi Shyan, Sim Ann, Koh Poh Koon, Tan Kiat How, Ker Sin Tze, Murali Pillai and Sam Tan, as well as Singapore Armed Forces top brass such as Ng Yat Chung, Aaron Beng, Ng Chee Khern, Hoo Cher Mou, Ng Chee Peng, Goh Si Hou and Kelvin Khong.

HCI's more notable alumni in business and finance include TikTok chief executive officer Shou Zi Chew, Hyflux founder Olivia Lum, United Overseas Bank (UOB) chairman Wee Cho Yaw, Razer Inc. founder Min-Liang Tan, Jumbo Group chief executive officer Ang Kiam Meng, CapitaLand chief executive Officer Ronald Tay, Qian Hu Corporation founder Kenny Yap, and Sea Ltd co-founder Ye Gang.

In the arts and media, there are also notable HCI alumni such as film director Anthony Chen, musicians Liang Wern Fook, Eric Moo, and Gentle Bones, artist Tan Swie Hian, playwright Kuo Pao Kun, and actress Grace Quek, better known as Annabel Chong.

== Gallery ==
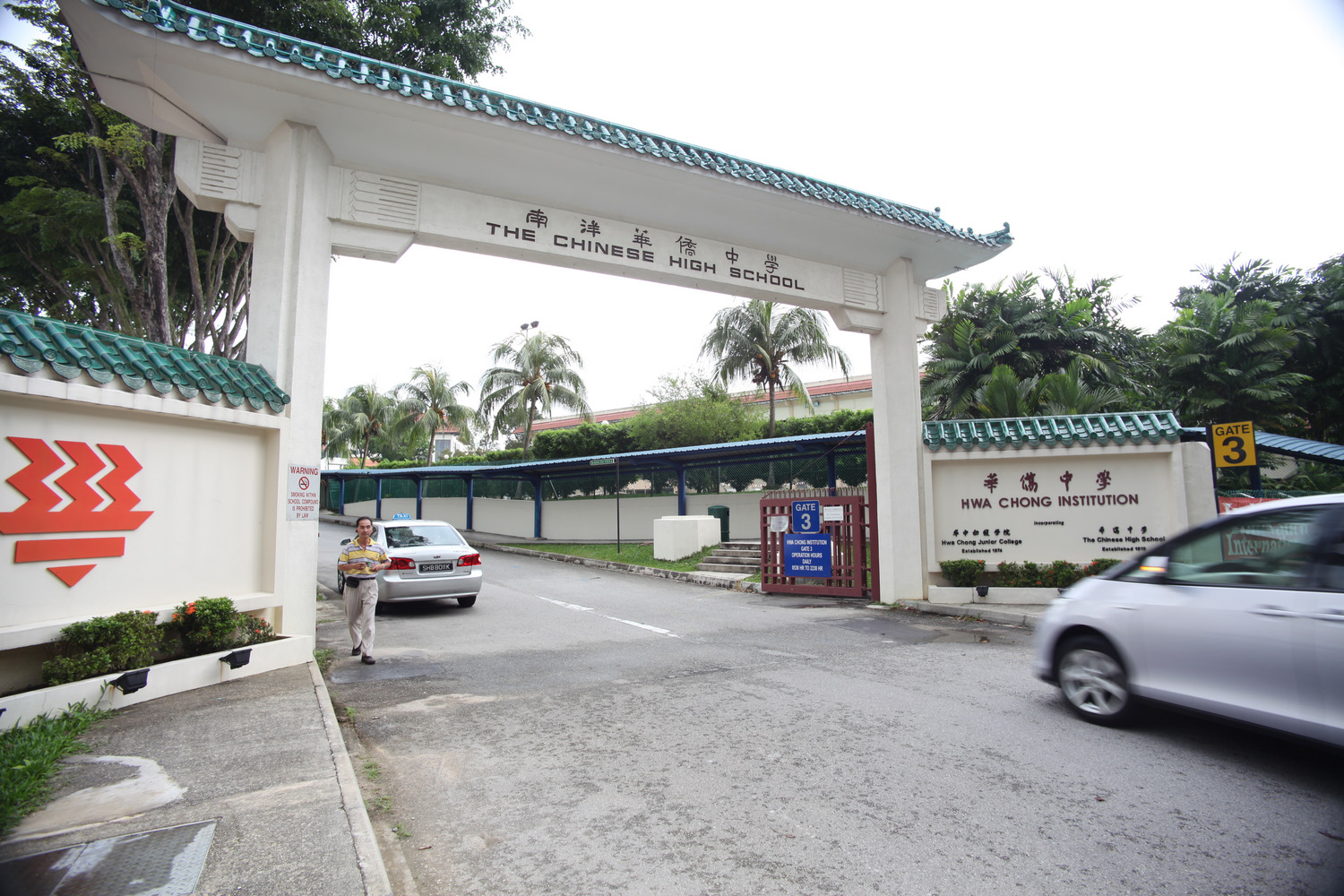
Gate 3 of Hwa Chong Institution

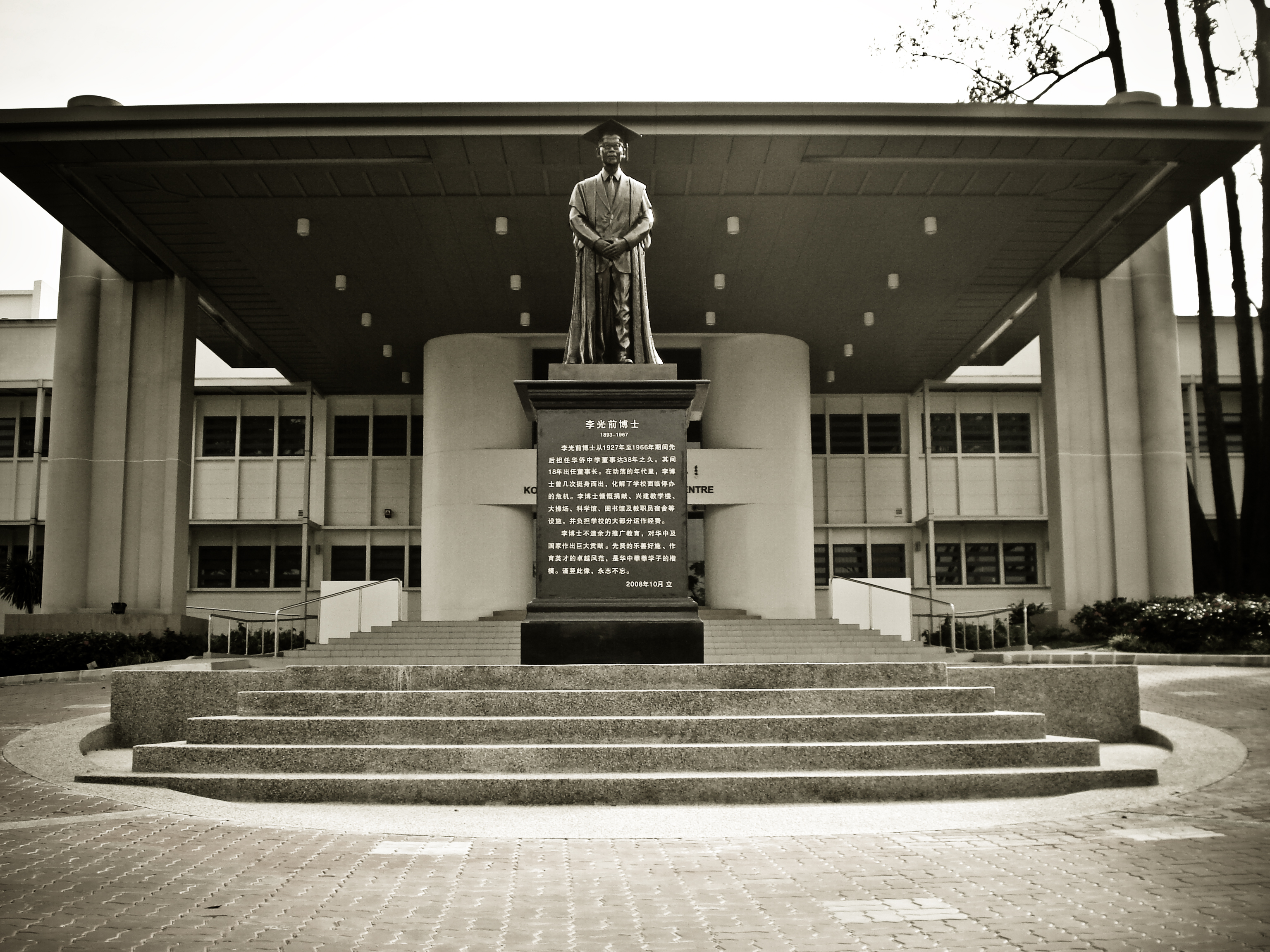
Statue of Lee Kong Chian, a major donor, after whom the Kong Chian Administration Centre in the background is named

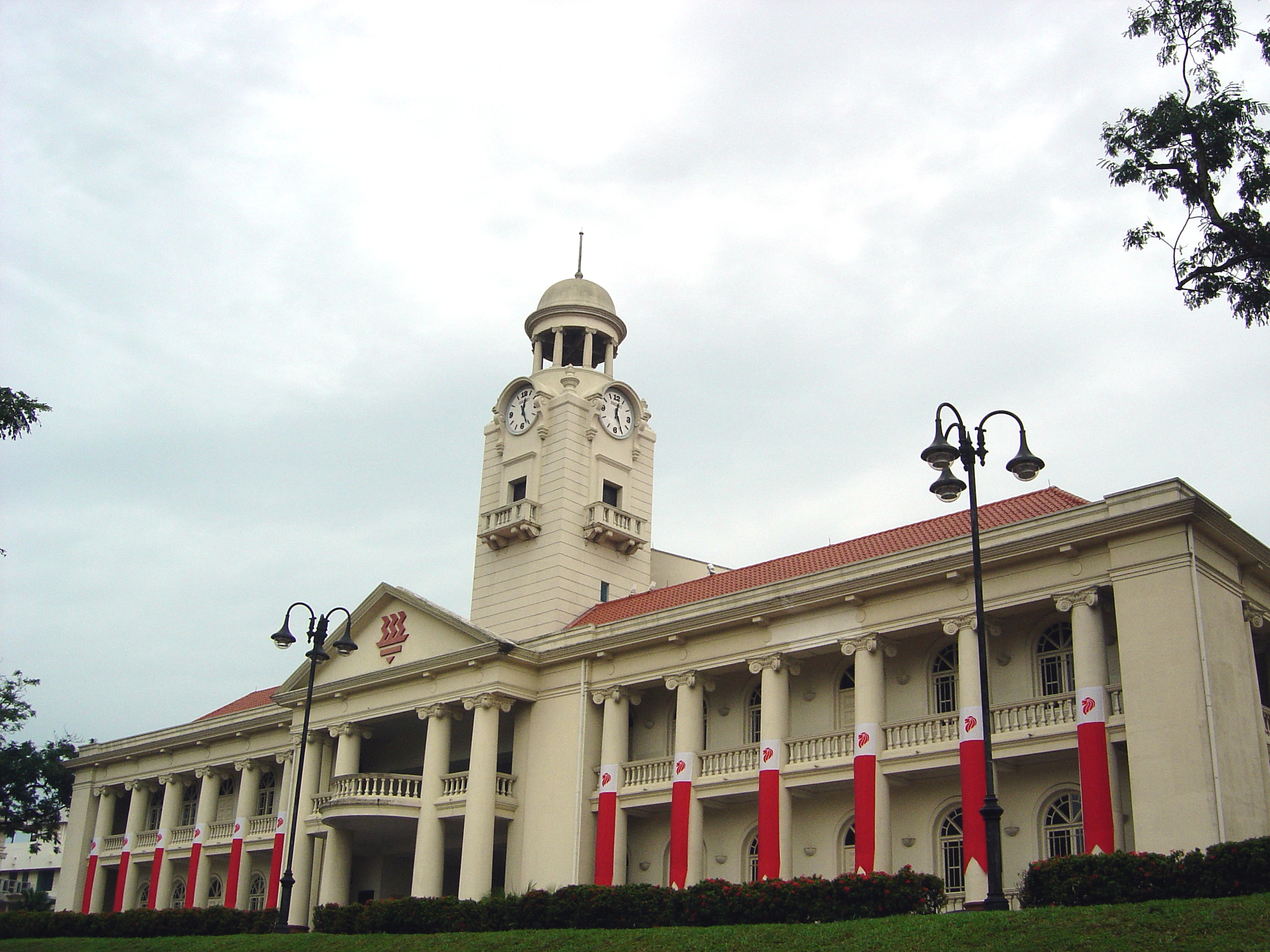
The Clock Tower Building, a national monument, which formerly served as an observation point during the Battle of Singapore

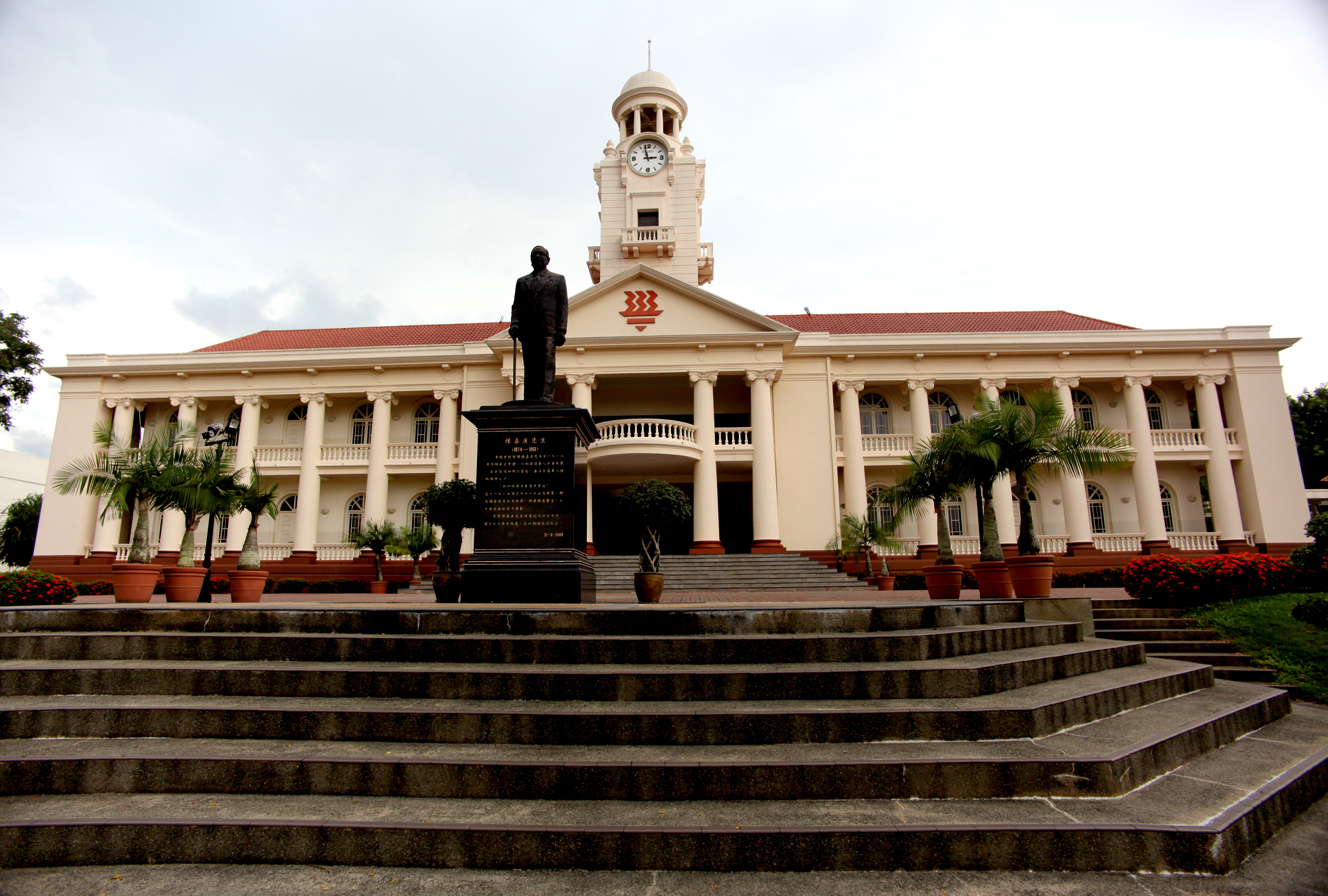
Another view of the Clock Tower, with a statue of Tan Kah Kee in front of it

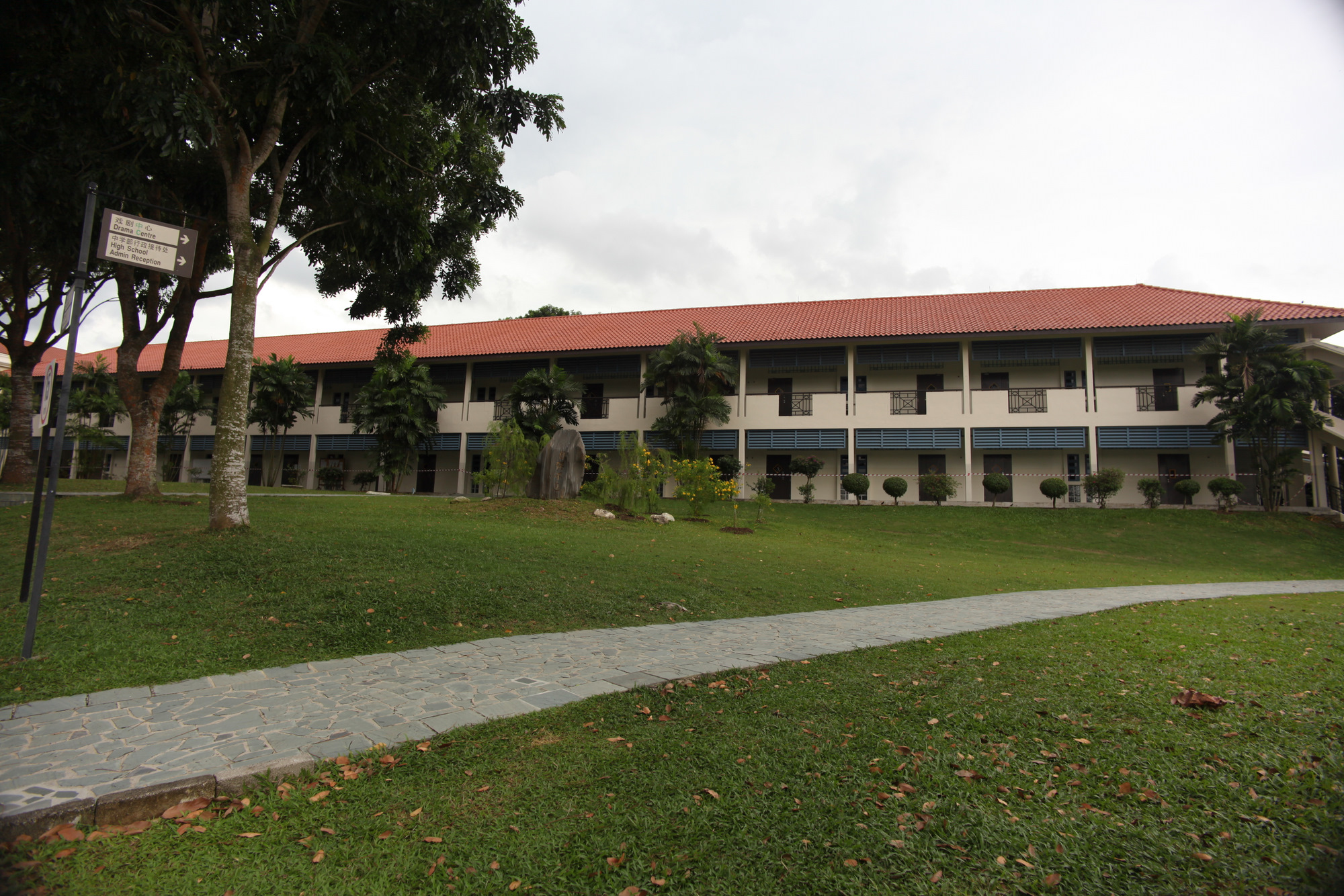
Classroom Block A of the High School Section

== See also ==
- Education in Singapore
- Integrated Programme
- List of schools in Singapore
