= Hwa Chong International School =

- 华中国际学校 (Chinese); Sekolah Antarabangsa Hwa Chong (Malay) ஹ்வா சாங்ச ர்வதேச பள்ளி (Tamil)

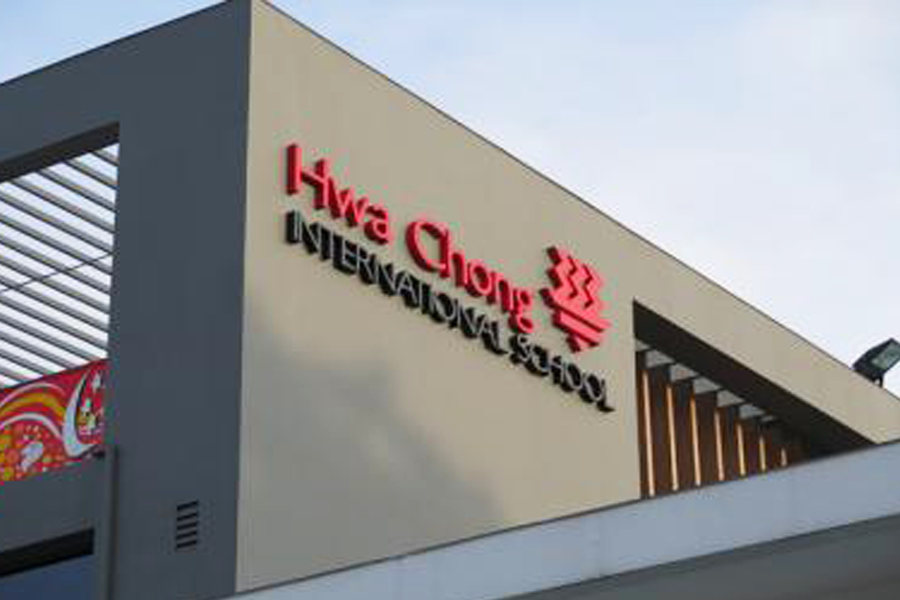
- The main block of Hwa Chong International School, within the campus of Hwa Chong Institution.

Location
- 663 Bukit Timah Road; Singapore 269783; Singapore
- Coordinates: 1.3261°N 103.8012°E

Information
- Type: International school Co-educational; Independent
- Motto: Continual Pursuit of Excellence
- Established: 1 January 2005; 21 years ago
- Principal: Linda Lee
- Enrollment: 950
- Colour: Red Yellow
- Affiliation: Hwa Chong Institution; Hwa Chong Institution Boarding School
- Website: https://www.hcis.edu.sg/

Hwa Chong International School (HCIS) is a co-educational international school in Bukit Timah, Central Region, Singapore that offers secondary education under the International Baccalaureate (IB) programme. It is an affiliated school of Hwa Chong Institution (HCI) but remains distinct from it, differing considerably in academic standards, enrollment and faculty. While HCI is focused on local academic excellence, HCIS is largely catered toward international students from affluent families, prioritising a global education model over the traditional domestic academic track.

== Overview ==
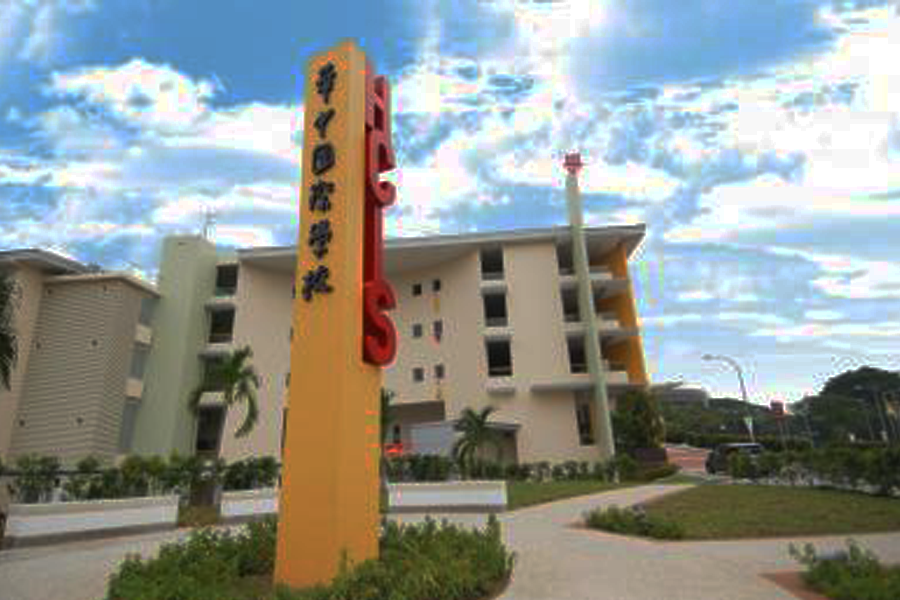
Hwa Chong International School campus, within the campus of Hwa Chong Institution.

Founded in 2005, Hwa Chong International School (HCIS) is part of the Hwa Chong family of schools. While it is an international school, about half of the students are either Singaporeans or permanent residents, largely the latter, a requirement from the Ministry of Education (MOE). The rest of the student body comprises international students from over dozens of countries.

== Activities ==
In November 2007, Hwa Chong International School hosted an International Youth Forum on Global Warming, attended by students from several countries.

HCIS was one of the three IB schools in Singapore chosen to host the International Baccalaureate Asia Pacific Regional Workshop in March 2009.

== Controversies ==
=== Bullying case ===
In 2020, a video went viral of a bullying case in HCIS. One student was shown pushing another boy towards a mirror in a toilet, holding the boy by the shoulders. He then told him to "laugh at yourself" and "laugh like hell". The school responded claiming that there was "no malice intended" in the case of a boy who was filmed taunting and beating up a fellow student in a toilet, and adding that the clip in question was over a year old.
