= International Science Youth Forum @ Singapore =

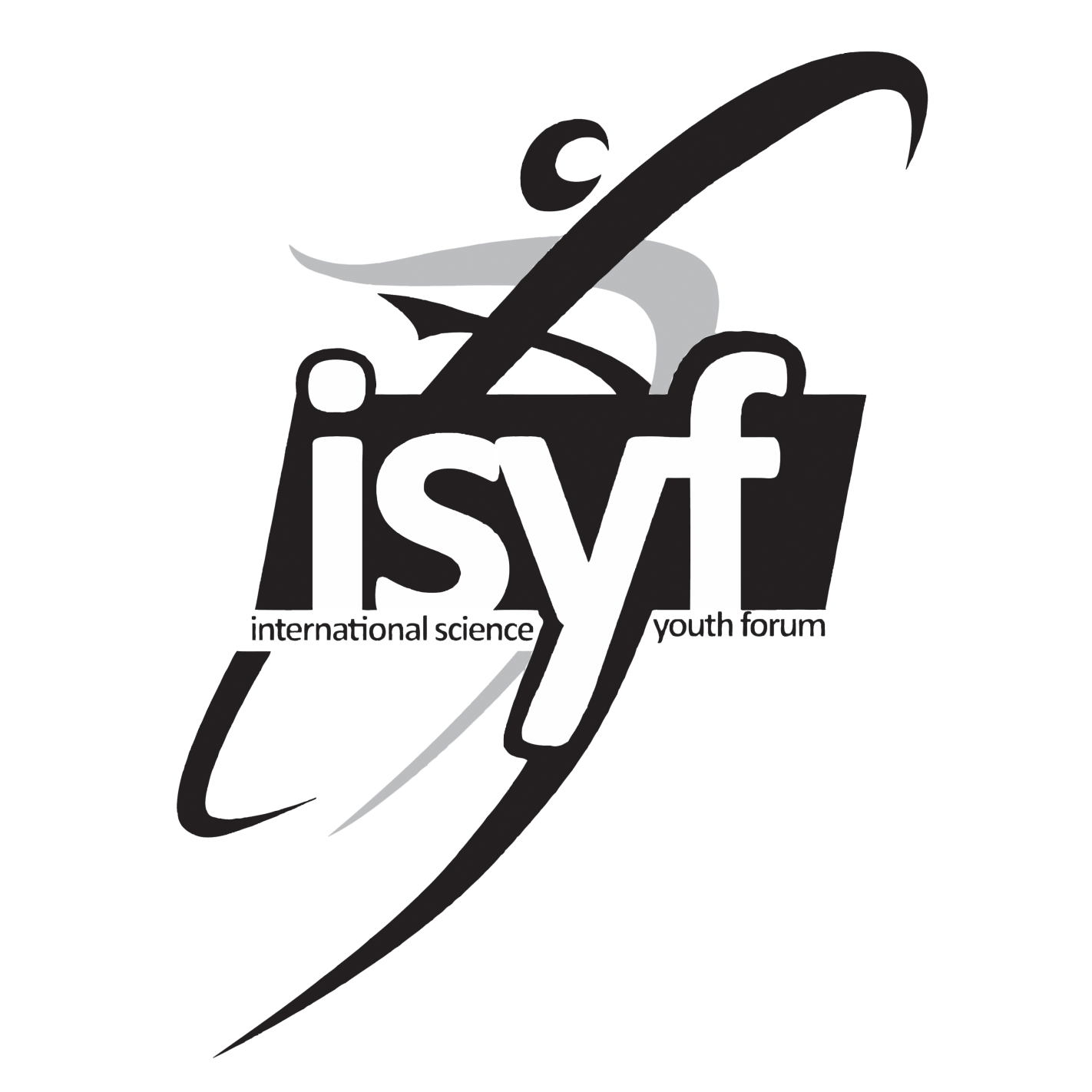
- Status: Active
- Genre: Forum
- Frequency: Annually
- Locations: Hwa Chong Institution, Nanyang Technological University
- Country: Singapore
- Years active: 18
- Inaugurated: January 19, 2009
- Most recent: 5th - 9th January 2026
- Website: isyf.hci.edu.sg

The International Science Youth Forum (ISYF) is a science enrichment programme for students from all over the globe. It is hosted at Hwa Chong Institution (HCI), under the Students' Science Research Club (SSRC), and co-organised by Ministry of Education (Singapore), with the support of National Research Foundation, Singapore, Agency for Science, Technology and Research (A*STAR), National University of Singapore (NUS), Nanyang Technological University (NTU), Singapore University of Technology and Design (SUTD) and Science Centre Singapore, bringing students from across Asia-Pacific together to network and dialogue, with Nobel laureates coming down to share their experiences in the scientific field.

The first edition of the event was hosted in 2009. In 2010, a record five Nobel laureates were involved in the panel discussion, one of the key parts of the forum. Afterwards, Nobel laureates consistently graced the event in conjunction with the Global Young Scientist Summit. On average, each year, ISYF brings together over 120 students and educators from all over the world.

In 2021 and 2022, due to the COVID-19 pandemic, the forum was held online through zoom. In 2023, the forum went back to its original physical format, inviting over 100 delegates across the world to Singapore. In 2024, the event was scaled back compared to previous years but still enjoyed praises from all stakeholders due to its smooth operation and meaningful talks. Following the success in 2024, further editions of the event was also hosted in 2025 and 2026.

== Forum ==
First organized in 2009 by students from Hwa Chong Institution and co-organized by Nanyang Technological University, Institute of Advanced Studies (IAS), the forum has been held every year since 2009.

=== Themes ===
| Year | Theme |
|---|---|
| 2009 | Science and the Ever Changing Environment |
| 2010 | Future Innovations and Science |
| 2011 | Challenges for a Sustainable World |
| 2012 | Nurturing the Scientific Mind |
| 2013 | Breaking Through |
| 2014 | Science for Humanity in the 21st Century |
| 2015 | Becoming a Modern Scientist |
| 2016 | Communicating Science |
| 2017 | Innovation for a Better Life |
| 2018 | Transcending Frontiers |
| 2019 | Science: A Common Language |
| 2020 | Evolving Aspirations: Divergent Pathways, Convergent Future |
| 2022 | Sparking Innovation, Igniting Collaboration |
| 2023 | Reconnecting, Reimagining: Looking Ahead to a Better World |
| 2024 | Science and Technology for Humanity: Building a Sustainable Future |
| 2025 | Innovation Unified: Towards A Better Future |
| 2026 | Curiosity Unlocked: How Questions Drive Discovery in the Age of AI |

== Eminent Scientists over the Years ==
| Name | Notable Award/Position/Accomplishment | Year(s) Invited |
|---|---|---|
| Sir Anthony Leggett | Nobel Prize in Physics in 2003 | 2009, 2012, 2014, 2016, 2017 |
| Professor Douglas D. Osheroff | Nobel Prize in Physics in 1996 | 2009, 2010, 2013 |
| Professor Kurt Wüthrich | Nobel Prize in Chemistry in 2002 | 2009, 2014 |
| Professor Avram Hershko | Nobel Prize in Chemistry in 2004 | 2009 |
| Professor Jerome I. Friedman | Nobel Prize in Physics in 1990 | 2010, 2011 2014, 2016 |
| Sir Richard J. Roberts | Nobel Prize in Physiology or Medicine in 1993 | 2010, 2015 |
| Professor Leland H. Hartwell | Nobel Prize in Physiology or Medicine in 2001 | 2010 |
| Professor David J. Gross | Nobel Prize in Physics in 2004 | 2010, 2014, 2016 |
| Professor David Phillips | President of Royal Society of Chemistry | 2010 |
| Professor Robert C. Richardson | Nobel Prize in Physics in 1996 | 2011 |
| Professor Vladimir Voevodsky | Fields Medal in 2002 | 2011, 2013, 2014, 2017 |
| Professor Aaron Ciechanover | Nobel Prize in Chemistry in 2004 | 2012, 2014, 2015 |
| Professor Claude Cohen-Tannoudji | Nobel Prize in Physics in 1997 | 2012, 2015, 2018, 2019 |
| Professor Danny Shechtman | Nobel Prize in Chemistry in 2011 | 2012, 2013 |
| Professor Sydney Brenner | Nobel Prize in Physiology or Medicine in 2002 | 2012 |
| Professor James Barber | Fellow of the Royal Society in 2005 | 2012 |
| Professor Albert Fert | Nobel Prize in Physics in 2007 | 2013 |
| Professor Artur Ekert | Co-inventor of Quantum Cryptography | 2013 |
| Professor Ada Yonath | Nobel Prize in Chemistry in 2009 | 2014, 2018, 2019, 2020 |
| Professor Hartmut Michel | Nobel Prize in Chemistry in 1988 | 2014, 2023 |
| Dr. J. Robin Warren | Nobel Prize in Physiology or Medicine in 2005 | 2014, 2016 |
| Professor Martin Chalfie | Nobel Prize in Chemistry in 2008 | 2014 |
| Professor Stephen Smale | Fields Medal in 1966 | 2014 |
| Professor Jackie Ying | Named one of the "One Hundred Engineers of the Modern Era" by AIChE; Executive Director of Institute of Bioengineering and Nanotechnology in A*STAR; Professor in Department of Chemical Engineering at Massachusetts Institute of Technology (MIT) | 2014, 2018 |
| Professor Andre Geim | Nobel Prize in Physics in 2010 | 2015, 2017 |
| Professor Arieh Warshel | Nobel Prize in Chemistry in 2013 | 2015 |
| Sir Tim Hunt | Nobel Prize in Physiology or Medicine in 2001 | 2015, 2016, 2017, 2018, 2019, 2020,2023 |
| Professor Ngô Bảo Châu | Fields Medal in 2010 | 2015 |
| Dr. Ng Wai Kiong | Team Leader and Senior Scientist for Formulation Sciences at Institute of Chemical and Engineering Sciences (ICES) (Singapore) | 2015 |
| Dr. Su Yi | Deputy Department Director of Computing Science Department at A*STAR | 2015, 2020 |
| Professor Carlo Rubbia | Nobel Prize in Physics in 1984 | 2016 |
| Professor Ei-ichi Negishi | Nobel Prize in Chemistry in 2010 | 2016 |
| Professor Rudolph Arthur Marcus | Nobel Prize in Chemistry in 1992 | 2017 |
| Professor Barbara Liskov | ACM A.M. Turing Award in 2008 | 2017 |
| Professor Michael Grätzel | Millennium Technology Prize in 2010 | 2017, 2020 |
| Sir James Fraser Stoddart | Nobel Prize in Chemistry in 2016 | 2018 |
| Professor Klaus von Klitzing | Nobel Prize in Physics in 1985 | 2018 |
| Professor François Englert | Nobel Prize in Physics in 2013 | 2018 |
| Sir Michael Francis Atiyah | Fields Medal in 1966; Abel Prize in 2004 | 2018 |
| Dr. Guo Huili | Adjunct Assistant Professor at Department of Biological Sciences in National University of Singapore (NUS) | 2018 |
| Professor Lim Xin Hong | Principal Investigator at Institute of Medical Biology in A*STAR; Adjunct Assistant Professor at Lee Kong Chian School of Medicine in Nanyang Technological University (NTU); Adjunct Assistant Professor at Cancer and Stem Cell Biology Programme in Duke-NUS Medical School | 2018 |
| Dr. Michael Sullivan | Department Director at Institute of High Performance Computing in A*STAR; Adjunct Assistant Professor at National University of Singapore (NUS) | 2018 |
| Dr. Jonathan Loh | Senior Principal Investigator at Institute of Molecular and Cell Biology in A*STAR | 2018 |
| Professor Tan Choon Hong | Associate Professor at Nanyang Technological University (NTU); President of Singapore National Institute of Chemistry; Director of CN Yang Scholars Programme | 2018 |
| Professor Barry Barish | Nobel Prize in Physics 2017 | 2019 |
| Professor Michael Levitt | Nobel Prize in Chemistry 2013 | 2019 |
| Professor Pierre-Louis Lions | Field Medal in 1994 | 2019 |
| Dr. Tuomo Suntola | Millenium Technology Prize in 2018 | 2019 |
| Dr. Chong Yi Dong | Associate Professor at Nanyang Technological University (NTU), School of Physical & Mathematical Sciences; Assistant Chair, School of Physical & Mathematical Sciences | 2019 |
| Dr. Kat Agres | Founder and Principal investigator in the Music Cognition Group under the Social & Cognitive Computing Department, Institute of High Performance Computing, at A*STAR; Assistant Professor at National University of Singapore (NUS) Yong Siew Toh Conservatory of Music | 2019 |
| Dr. Kedar Hippalgaonkar | Assistant Professor at Nanyang Technological University (NTU), School of Material Science and Engineering | 2019 |
| Dr. Thomas Liew | Associate Professor and Executive Director in the Department of Electrical and Computer Engineering, at the National University of Singapore (NUS); Member of International Committee of Weights and Measures; Member of the board of directors of Metrologia; Executive Director of National Metrology Centre | 2019 |
| Professor Zee Upton | Research director of Institute of Medical Biology (IMB), A*STAR; Leader of the Skin Integrity, Repair and Regeneration Theme in the Skin Research Institute of Singapore (SRIS), a tripartite initiative with Nanyang Technological University and the National Health Group | 2019 |
| Sir Konstantin Novoselov | Nobel Prize in Physics in 2010 | 2020 |
| Professor Wendelin Werner | Fields Medal in 2006 | 2020 |
| Dr. Anand Andiappan | SIgN Fellow at the Singapore Immunology Network (SIgN); Senior Scientist at A*STAR | 2020 |
| Professor David Cameron-Smith | Senior Principal Investigator at the Singapore Institute for Clinical Sciences, part of A*STAR | 2020 |
| Dr. Neerja Karnani | Senior Principal Investigator leading the Systems Biology and Integrative Omics group at Singapore Institute for Clinical Sciences (SICS), A*STAR | 2020 |
| Dr Pavitra Krishnaswamy | Scientist, Principal Investigator and Deputy Division Head at the Institute for Infocomm Research at A*STAR | 2020 |
