= Hwa Chong Institution Boarding School =

Coordinates: 1°19′30″N 103°48′1″E

Hwa Chong Institution Boarding School 华中寄宿学校 (Chinese) Sekolah Berasrama Institusi Hwa Chong (Malay)

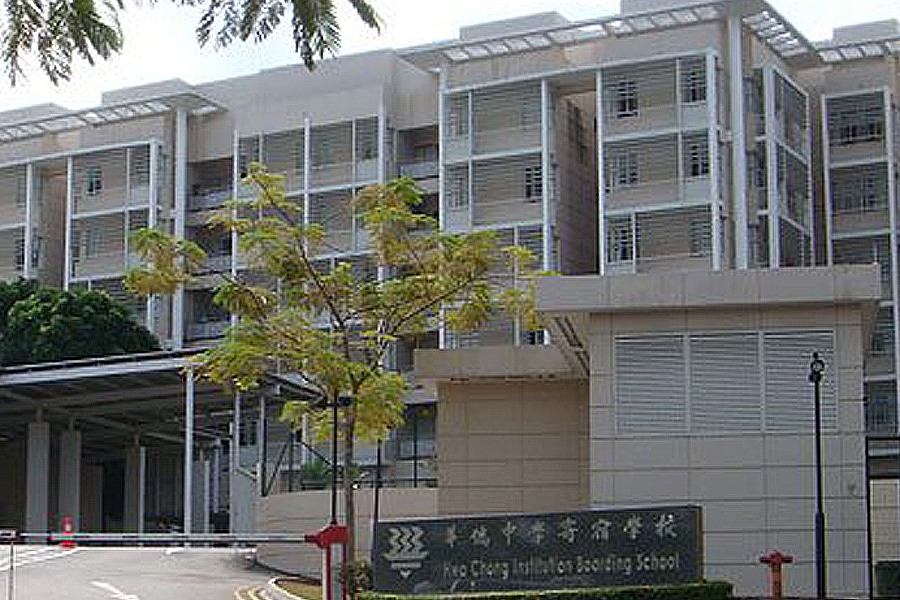
- The entrance of Hwa Chong Institution Boarding School, within Hwa Chong Institution.

Address
- 673 Bukit Timah Road, Singapore 269735; Singapore; Singapore

Information
- Type: Boarding school
- Established: 2002
- Colour(s): Red Yellow
- Affiliation: Hwa Chong International School; Hwa Chong Institution; Nanyang Girls High School
- Website: www.hcibs.edu.sg/

Hwa Chong Institution Boarding School (HCIBS) is a boarding school located in Hwa Chong Institution, Singapore. The boarding school is part of the Hwa Chong family of schools, including Hwa Chong Institution and Hwa Chong International School.

The boarding school began its operations in 2002, and was officially opened in 2003 by then-Deputy Prime Minister Lee Hsien Loong. There are also local boarders, who are mainly students from Hwa Chong Institution.

Each 18-24 boarders will be assigned with a cluster mentor, who provides a link between boarding school and parents and who is concerned with all aspects of his/her education, personal development and welfare.

== Boarding complex and facilities ==
Designed by architect Kenzo Tange, the complex consists of seven 6-storey blocks (Hall A - Hall G) providing accommodation for up to 1,000 boarders or guests. Halls A, B and C each has five residential levels (six for Hall E, F and G), in which each level is separated into left and right clusters, while Halls E, F and G each has six residential levels. Halls E, F, and G are also connected with walkways. Each cluster is supervised by a cluster mentor, who act as guardians to the students living there.

== Integrated Boarding Programme ==
Besides scholars, all secondary 3 and 4 students of Hwa Chong Institution (High School) are given an opportunity to board in the boarding school for one term (at a time). Students may choose to continue boarding after their term has ended. As of 2014, it has been increased to 2 terms.

== Boarders' Council ==
The Boarders' Council is a student committee elected by the boarding school population. It acts as a bridge between boarders and the boarding school staff. The Boarders' Council is also responsible for the organization and planning of major events such as Investiture Dinner, National Day Celebrations, Year-End Dinner, Orientation and Chinese New Year. The first Boarders' Council was formed in 2001.
