= High Performance School =

Distinction for Malaysian schools

In Malaysia, a High Performance School (Malay: Sekolah Berprestasi Tinggi; also known as HPS) is a title conferred to a group of schools that have ethos, character, and a unique identity to excel in all aspects of education. The schools have a tradition of high culture and excellent work with the national human capital and continuing to grow holistically and are competitive in the international arena. The title is given by Malaysian Ministry of Education (MOE). This is a section of a part of the National Key Result Areas of Government Transformation Programme (GTP).

== Background ==
Desire to identify and create Sekolah Berprestasi Tinggi (SBT) has been announced by the Prime Minister, Dato Seri Najib Bin Tun Abdul Razak in his speech at the National Assembly administration members, civil servants and government-linked companies (GLCs) at the Putrajaya International Convention Centre (PICC) on 27 July 2009. This is as a section in one of the six main part in NKRA which is ″Improving Student Outcome".

"As a pilot project, a total of 100 schools, consisting of ordinary types, schools, cluster schools and boarding schools. With this, we will provide an environment conducive to teaching and learning and promote cooperation between the public and private sector to drive the achievement of students. All these plans will be implemented within three years before the end of 2012."

MOE has prepared an action plan to identify 100 SBT by 2012. This effort is in line with the "1Malaysia: People First, Performance Now". On 9 September 2009, MOE decided to recognize 100 schools consisting of government schools and government-aided schools to be set up as SBT and a SBT Sector Management Division of Residential School and Cluster School (BPSBPSK) so that management of SBT can be implemented efficiently.

A total of 20 schools have been announced as SBT Cohort 1 by Deputy Prime Minister and the Minister of Education, Tan Sri Muhyiddin Yassin on 25 January 2010. The recognition ceremony was held at SMK Aminuddin Baki, Kuala Lumpur on 29 January 2010. On 18 February 2011, a total of 23 schools was announced as SBT Cohort 2 at Sarawak. Another 9 schools were elevated to SBT on 25 May 2011. On 4 February 2012, another 14 schools recognized as SBT Cohort 3 in a recognition ceremony in Putrajaya. On 28 December 2012, 25 schools were given SBT status. After almost 2 years, the fifth cohort consisting of 13 schools were announced, bringing the total to 128. RM27.8mil had been allocated for the schools to enhance their quality of education. The government has agreed to continue the project from 2013 to 2015 with the target of 10 SBTs each year with at least one SBT in each state.

== Rational ==
Rational appreciation and give recognition to the school HPS is to:

- Lifting Best Quality Schools: Improving the quality of school performance through increased levels of autonomy to enable schools to implement innovation in education (e.g., organizational management, instructional management, curriculum management, financial management and human resource management).
- Producing Outstanding Students: Produce outstanding students of international caliber to further their education in educational institutions in the world and become superior personalities in all fields of endeavor.
- Bridging the Gap Between Schools in System: Inspire other schools to develop excellence to high levels through bench marking, mentoring and networking with HPS.

== Selection ==
Selection of schools for SBT recognition were conducted by the Selection Committee of SBT, chaired by the Director General of Education (DG) and staffed by the Deputy Director of Education (TKPPM), Operations Sector Education Sector Policy and Development TKPPM Education, Teaching Professionalism TKPPM Sector Development, Director Boarding Schools Management Division and the School of Excellence (BPSBPSK) and the Secretariat of the National Key Result Areas (NKRA). The selection criteria are announced to all schools through MOE portal.

SBT candidate for recognition consists of primary and secondary schools which are in Band 1 based on a composite score that takes into account the Grade Point Average (GPS) and Decision Self Rating School (SMEs) based on Malaysian Education Quality Standard (SQEM).

HPS selection through three screenings:

- First Screening: School is in a band (1), the primary school got a composite score of at least 85 percent (%), and secondary school got a composite score of at least 90 percent (%) Recognition Nomination Form must fill HPS (BPP-SBT). Composite score is a 70% average grade school (GPS) and 30% of Malaysian Education Quality Standard (SQEM). Schools will be listed according to the composite score and scores in BPP-SBT.
- Second Screening: OER will select the eligible school from the band of (1) to be evaluated and verified using SQEM instruments and Annex-SBT by the Inspectorate and Quality Assurance (JNJK). Annex-HPS will evaluate five characteristics of school excellence and superiority of eminent personalities, awards received, networking, networking and bench marking.
- Third screening: Schools that have been verified by JNJK sorted by rating scores SQEM and Annex-SBT. Only schools that receive a score of at least 90% in ratings SKPM have been verified by JNJK be taken into account. The selection committee will choose the school that is recognized as eligible for High Performance Schools.

== Honorarium ==
HPS schools received recognition given special provisions, incentives and training for leaders, teachers and support staff members (AKS). The management of the school are given autonomy in curriculum management, financial management, human resources management and selection of students based on their performance.

== Criticism ==
The award were criticised as it only select the nation top school at current time and abandoned the other premier, historical schools. Victoria Institution, St. John's Institution, Penang Free School, Malacca High School, St. Michael's Institution, Sekolah Tuanku Abdul Rahman, St. Xavier's Institution and Bukit Mertajam High School were left behind during the announcing of 20 pioneer schools of SBT. Lee Wei Lian, Malaysian Insider journalist in his article "The tragic tale of Malaysia education" said,

Just imagine if Eton College in the UK or Raffles Institution in Singapore was not recognised as one of the top schools in their respective countries.

That is the equivalent of what has befallen what were once the most respected schools in Malaysia. Today, they do not even rate a mention on a list of the top 20 high performance schools.

He further added,

What does it then say about a government that allowed such historic and educational gems, some that date back nearly 200 years, to slip down the ranks in less than 50?"

Wong Chun Wai, the Group Chief Editor of The Star, in his article "Surprise Exclusion",

It's a huge disappointment. Most of us who come from premier schools must have wondered why the list of top 20 high performing schools, presumably the country's best, excluded our alma maters.

Dr. Mohamed Khir Bin Toyo, in his entry in his blog titled "Which is more important, SBT or Kids in the rural area?" questioned with some of the school already enrolled bright students such as Fully Residential School made the list, some students are only "lucky" for them to be in the awarded school. He said some teachers complain as their "ordinary" school budget were being cut down but at the same time, the government splashed RM 700 million for each SBT. He further questioned the priorities of the government of giving more to already establish schools but neglecting to lift up Low Performance School.

Politician, Lim Kit Siang, in his comment after the announcement of the nationals best students and schools for Sijil Pelajaran Malaysia 2009, said, "It is a slap for SBT's as only two of the nationals best students hails from SBT and only three schools from SBT's made up to the list in nationals best schools" .The others (8 out of 10 students and 7 out of 10 schools) is non-SBT's.

Teachers and Association leaders from Sabah and Sarawak criticised as the initial list do not contain any schools from either states.

Parents from SJK(C) Pei Hwa Pedas, Rembau on 17 February 2010, in their complain of the school did not have enough Islamic Education teachers, said "There is no use of producing SBT's if lack of educators is still a problem in our education."

== First cohort ==
20 pioneer schools were selected on 25 January 2010.

=== Fully Residential Schools ===
1. Sekolah Tun Fatimah, Johor Bahru, Johor (STF)
2. Sekolah Dato' Abdul Razak, Seremban, Negeri Sembilan (SDAR)
3. Malay College Kuala Kangsar, Perak (MCKK)
4. Sekolah Sultan Alam Shah, Putrajaya (SAS)
5. Sekolah Menengah Sains Tuanku Syed Putra, Perlis (SYED PUTRA)
6. Sekolah Menengah Sultan Abdul Halim, Jitra, Kedah (JENAN)
7. Kolej Islam Sultan Alam Shah, Klang, Selangor (KISAS)
8. Sekolah Seri Puteri, Cyberjaya (SSP)
9. Kolej Tunku Kurshiah, Bandar Enstek, Negeri Sembilan (TKC)
10. Sekolah Menengah Sains Muzaffar Syah, Ayer Keroh, Melaka (MOZAC)

=== National Secondary Schools ===
1. Sekolah Menengah Kebangsaan Sultanah Asma, Kedah
2. Sekolah Menengah Kebangsaan (P) St George, Penang
3. Sekolah Menengah Kebangsaan (P) Sri Aman, Petaling Jaya
4. SMK Aminuddin Baki, Kuala Lumpur

=== National Primary Schools ===
1. Sekolah Kebangsaan Seri Bintang Utara Kuala Lumpur
2. Sekolah Kebangsaan Zainab (2) Kota Baharu, Kelantan
3. Sekolah Kebangsaan Taman Tun Dr ismail, Kuala Lumpur
4. Sekolah Convent Kota Taiping, Perak
5. Sekolah Kebangsaan Bukit Damansara Kuala Lumpur

== Second Cohort ==
23 schools were conferred this title on 18 February 2011.

=== Government-funded Religious School ===
- Sekolah Menengah Imtiaz, Terengganu

=== Fully Residential Schools ===
1. Sekolah Menengah Sains Muar (SAMURA), Johor
2. Sekolah Tuanku Abdul Rahman (STAR), Perak
3. Sekolah Berasrama Penuh Integrasi Gombak (INTEGOMB), Selangor
4. Sekolah Berasrama Penuh Integrasi Kubang Pasu(iKups), Kedah
5. Sekolah Berasrama Penuh Integrasi Tun Abdul Razak (InSTAR), Pahang
6. Sekolah Menengah Sains Alam Shah (ASiS), Kuala Lumpur
7. SMS Tengku Muhammad Faris Petra (FARIS PETRA), Kelantan
8. Sekolah Menengah Sains Miri (SAINSRi), Sarawak
9. Sekolah Menengah Sains Seri Puteri (SESERI), Kuala Lumpur
10. Sekolah Menengah Sains Selangor (SMSS), Kuala Lumpur
11. Sekolah Menengah Sains Tengku Abdullah (SEMESTA), Pahang

=== National Primary Schools ===
1. Sekolah Kebangsaan (SK) Ulu Lubai, Sarawak
1. SK Convent Muar, Johor
2. SK Seri Biram, Pahang
3. SK Sultan Ahmad Tajuddin, Kedah
4. SK Setiawangsa, Kuala Lumpur
5. SK (Perempuan) Methodist Kuantan, Pahang
6. SK Sultan Ismail, Terengganu
7. SK Jalan Tiga, Selangor

=== National-type Premier Schools ===
1. SJK(C) Perempuan China, Pulau Pinang
2. SJK(C) Lick Hung, Selangor.

Another nine schools were chosen in SBT Cohort 2 on 25 May 2011.

=== Fully Residential School ===
1. Sekolah Menengah Sains Tuanku Munawir (SASER), Seremban
2. Sekolah Menengah Sains Sabah (SMESH), Kota Kinabalu
3. Sekolah Menengah Sains Kuching (SAINSKU), Sarawak.
4. Sekolah Menengah Agama Persekutuan Labu (SMAP LABU), Negeri Sembilan
5. Sekolah Menengah Sains Kuala Selangor (KUSESS), Kuala Selangor
6. Sekolah Menengah Sains Tengku Abdullah (SEMESTA), Pahang

=== National Secondary School ===
- Sekolah Menengah Kebangsaan Lembah Bidong, Kuala Terengganu
- Sekolah Menegah Kebangsaan King George V (KGV) Seremban, Negeri Sembilan

=== Religious School ===
- Sekolah Menengah Kebangsaan Agama Naim Lil Banat, Kota Bharu

=== National Premier School ===
- Sekolah Kebangsaan Seksyen 9, Shah Alam

=== National-type Premier School ===
- Sekolah Jenis Kebangsaan Cina Tung Hua, Sibu

== Third Cohort ==
14 schools elevated to SBT on 2 February 2012.

=== Fully Residential Schools ===
1. Sekolah Menengah Sains Perempuan, Seremban
2. Sekolah Menengah Sains Johor
3. Sekolah Menengah Sains Kota Tinggi (SAKTI), Johor
4. Sekolah Menengah Sains Sultan Mohamad Jiwa, Kedah
5. Sekolah Menengah Sains Tuanku Jaafar (STJ), Negeri Sembilan

National Premier School

1. Sekolah Kebangsaan (SK) Infant Jesus, Malacca.

2. SK (P) Sultan Ibrahim

3. SK Ibrahim

4. SK Minden Heights, Penang

5. SK Sultan Sulaiman 1

6. SK Tengku Mahmud, Terengganu

7. SK Wellesley, Penang

8. SK Assunta Convent, Pahang

National-type Premier School

1.SJKC Foon Yew 2, Johor

2.SJKC Keat Hwa (H)

3.SJKC Kwang Hwa, Penang.

== Fourth Cohort ==
Another 25 schools were conferred on 28 December 2012.

=== Fully Residential School ===
1. Sekolah Menengah Sains Sultan Mahmud, Terengganu
2. Sekolah Menengah Sains Kepala Batas, Penang
3. Sekolah Menengah Sains Pokok Sena, Kedah
4. Sekolah Sains Sultan Haji Ahmad Shah, Pahang
5. Sekolah Menengah Sains Hulu Selangor (SEMAHSUR), Selangor
6. Sekolah Menengah Sains Labuan, Labuan
7. Sekolah Berasrama Penuh Integrasi Batu Rakit (BRAINS), Terengganu
8. Sekolah Berasrama Penuh Integrasi Selandar, Malacca
9. Sekolah Berasrama Penuh Integrasi Kuantan

=== National Secondary School ===
1. SMK Sultan Ismail, Johor
2. SMK Infant Jesus Convent, Johor

=== Government-funded Religious School ===
- SM Imtiaz Kuala Terengganu

=== National Premier School ===
1. SK Tengku Ampuan Intan, Terengganu
2. SK Zainab 1, Kelantan
3. SK Bertam Indah, Penang
4. SK Sultanah Asma, Kedah
5. SMK Jalan Empat
6. SK Convent Infant Jesus 2, Malacca
7. SK Bandar Penawar 2, Johor
8. SK Seri Gaya, Sabah
9. SK (P) Methodist 2, Malacca
10. SK Bandar Maharani, Johor
11. SRK Seri Indera, Perlis

=== National-type Premier School ===
1. SJK(C) Ave Maria Convent, Perak
2. SJK(C) Yok Bin, Malacca
3. SJK(C) Union, Penang

On 18 September 2013, 24 school were elevated as SBT.

=== Fully Residential School ===
1. Sekolah Menengah Sains Kubang Pasu (KUPSIS)
2. Sekolah Menengah Sains Machang (SMACH)
3. Sekolah Berasrama Penuh Integrasi Jempol (INTEJ)
4. Sekolah Menengah Sains Raja Tun Azlan Shah (SERATAS)
5. Sekolah Berasrama Penuh Integrasi Gopeng (I-GOP)
6. Sekolah Menengah Agama Persekutuan Kajang (SMAPK)
7. Sekolah Berasrama Penuh Integrasi Rawang (SEPINTAR)

=== National Secondary School ===
1. Sekolah Menengah Kebangsaan Dato' Penggawa Barat, Pontian, Johor

=== Religious School ===
1. Sekolah Menengah Kebangsaan Agama (SMKA) Sharifah Rodziah
2. SMKA Al Irshad

=== National Premier School ===
1. SK Tengku Mariam
2. SK Convent of the Infant Jesus 1 (M)
3. SK Convent
4. SK Sultan Idris II
5. SK Marian Convent
6. SK Batu Lanchang
7. SK Taman Megah
8. SK Bukit Jelutong
9. SK Sri Petaling
10. SK Putrajaya Presint 11 (1)

=== National-type Premier School ===
1. SJK (T) Ladang Rem
2. SJK(C) Han Chiang
3. SJK (C) Kuen Cheng 2

== Fifth Cohort ==
On 30 October 2014, 13 schools were granted this title.

=== Fully Residential School ===
1. Sekolah Menengah Sains Rembau, Rembau, Negeri Sembilan
2. Sekolah Menengah Sains Tun Syed Sheh Shahabudin, Bukit Mertajam, Penang

=== National Secondary School ===
1. Sekolah Menengah Kebangsaan Bukit Jambul, Gelugor, Penang
2. Sekolah Menengah Kebangsaan Abdul Rahman Talib, Kuantan, Pahang

=== National Primary School ===
1. SK Air Merah, Kedah
2. SK Seri Wakaf Baharu, Kelantan
3. SK Kubang Kerian 3, Kelantan
4. SK St. Thomas, Pahang
5. SK Lingga Baru, Sabah
6. SK Saujana Impian, Selangor
7. SK Kampong Raja, Terengganu
8. SK Putrajaya Presint 9 (2), Putrajaya.

=== National-type Primary School ===
1. SJKT Ringlet, Pahang

== Sixth Cohort ==
On 18 Mac 2016, 6 schools were granted this title.

=== Fully Residential School ===
1. Sekolah Menengah Sains Lahad Datu, Lahad Datu, Sabah.
2. Sekolah Menengah Sains Tapah, Tapah, Perak

=== National Primary School ===
1. SK Father Barre's Convent (M), Kedah.
2. SK Raja Muda (Integrasi), Selangor.
3. SK King George V, Negeri Sembilan.
4. SK Putrajaya Presint 18 (1), Putrajaya.

== See also ==
- Government Transformation Programme (Malaysia)
- Education in Malaysia
- Sekolah Berasrama Penuh
- Cluster School
