= Sekolah Menengah Agama Persekutuan Bentong =

Coordinates: 3.4736°N 102.0177°E

Sekolah Menengah Agama Persekutuan Bentong (Arabic المدرسة الثنوية الدنية الفدرلية بنتوغ)

Location
- 28600 Karak; Bentong, Pahang; Malaysia

Information
- Other name: SUPERB
- Type: Boarding school
- Motto: Superb Unggul Pencetus Reformasi Berintegriti
- Established: 2012
- School district: Bentong
- Principal: En. Mohd Joha bin A. Wahab@Mohamad
- Grades: Forms 1 to 5
- Classrooms: Ibnu Arabi, Ibnu Khaldun, Ibnu Majjah, Ibnu Nafis, Ibnu Rushd, Ibnu Sina
- Colours: Purple and orange
- Yearbook: Suara SUPERB
- Affiliations: Sekolah Berasrama Penuh (Ministry of Education)
- School code: CRA 0001
- Special student bodies: Majlis Kepimpinan Murid (MKM); Pembimbing Rakan Sebaya (PRS); Badan Agama Dakwah, Akhlak dan Kerohanian (BADAR); SUPERB Peach Prefects (SPP)
- Principles: Religion (agama), knowledge (ilmu) and good deeds (amal)
- Website: http://www.superb.edu.my/

Sekolah Menengah Agama Persekutuan Bentong (SMAP Bentong), usually known as SUPERB (derived from Sekolah Agama Persekutuan Bentong) (Arabic: المعهد الإسلامي الفدرالي بنتوغ; English: Bentong Federal Islamic Secondary School) is the seventh residential school (Sekolah Berasrama Penuh) in Pahang Darul Makmur, Malaysia. It is Pahang's first Sekolah Menengah Agama Persekutuan (SMAP) and Malaysia's third, after Sekolah Menengah Agama Persekutuan Labu and Sekolah Menengah Agama Persekutuan Kajang. SUPERB was the first residential school which implemented the Ministry of Education's Tahfiz Model Ulul Albab program (in 2014), in which students undergo the Tahfiz program with five years of study.

== History ==
Construction of SM Agama Persekutuan Bentong began on 10 April 2008, and was completed in October 2011 at a total cost of RM 56.6 million. The school covers an area of 40 acres (16 ha). The acronym SUPERB was coined by Khairil Azwar Razali, the school's first head of its English-language department. SMAP Bentong began operation on 11 June 2012, with 20 teachers, eight staff members, and its initial batch of students. The following year, SM Agama Persekutuan Bentong received two more batches: Predominate 1317 and Valours 1314. With the three batches, SMAP Bentong received several awards and certificates.

== Location ==
SMAP Bentong is in the FELDA settlement of Mempaga. The nearest towns are Karak and Bentong, 30 minutes away by road.

== Tahfiz Model Ulul Albab ==
The Tahfiz Model Ulul Albab (TMUA), which was implemented at SMAP Bentong in 2014, is a combination of the national curriculum (Kurikulum Kebangsaan) and Tahfiz Integrated Curriculum (Kurikulum Bersepadu Tahfiz, or KBT). It has three approaches:

- Quranic: Enables students to memorize all 30 chapters (juzu') of the Quran and understand its contents in five years of secondary-school study.
- Encyclopedic: Provides a foundation for students to master a variety of sciences and languages, making the students a reference source for their peers.
- Ijtihadik: Produces students who can express opinions to solve problems, maximizing creative higher-order thinking skills (HOTS). Students can participate in extra-curricular activities such as horseback riding, swimming and archery.

The implementation of the TMUA) in selected schools, under the supervision of the Education Ministry, is expected to produce 10,920 students who have memorized the Quran by 2021. It will provide an alternative to parents who want their children to be huffaz and hold professional positions.
