= Fully Residential Schools in Malaysia =

Malaysian boarding school

SBP logo

Sekolah Berasrama Penuh (SBP) or Fully Residential School is a school system established in Malaysia to nurture outstanding students to excel in academics and extracurricular activities. Since 2008, SBPs are directly administered by Fully Residential and Excellent Schools Management Division, Ministry of Education.

== History ==
SBP began in 1890, with Richard Olaf Winstedt as deputy (he later became Director of Education in Malaya). "The Selangor Raja School" was established as an English-mediated educational initiative to educate the Malay elites such as the members of the royal families in various Malayan states. In 1894, the school was closed for renovation and was reopened in 1905 at Kuala Kangsar, to this day known as the Malay College Kuala Kangsar (MCKK).

Sultan Idris Shah I of Perak, in the Conference of Rulers (Durbar) in 1903, criticised the policy of British administration, especially in the education of the Malays, saying it was merely "to produce better Malay farmers or fishermen only". Sultan of Perak himself has offered on-site locations for MCKK, with the purpose "for the education of the Malays of good family and for the training of Malay boys for admission to certain branches of the government service". In 1947, "Malay Girl College" was established in Kuala Lumpur, later moved to Seremban, Negeri Sembilan, known as Tunku Kurshiah College until now, named after the first Raja Permaisuri Agong.

In September 1955, an Education Committee was established which led to the conception of the Razak Report in 1956. Razak Report approved and produced the Education Ordinance 1957. The Razak Report recommended the formation of six units of Sekolah Berasrama Penuh (SBP), namely Sekolah Dato' Abdul Razak (1956), Sekolah Tun Fatimah (1956), Sekolah Tuanku Abdul Rahman (1957), Sekolah Menengah Sultan Abdul Halim (1963), Sekolah Sultan Alam Shah (1963) and Sekolah Seri Puteri (1968).

In 1955, Kolej Islam Malaya was embodied in the former palace on the site, which was donated by Sultan Hisamuddin in Klang, Selangor. In 1966, the college was moved to Jalan Universiti in Petaling Jaya, Selangor. In 1967, after the customisation work was completed, the college relocated to Klang and was named Kolej Islam Klang. In 1972, the college administration was taken over entirely by the Ministry of Education and the name was changed to Kolej Islam Sultan Alam Shah.

On 1 July 1971, all nine residential schools have been administered directly by Education Minister instead of State Directors of Education. Between 1973 and 1975, 10 SBPs were built. The projects that needed to be implemented in the Second Malaysia Plan were stated as "important projects in the plan is the establishment of ten pilot residential science secondary schools added to provide educational opportunities for pupils from rural areas to pursue their education in science subjects."

To date, Malaysia has 74 SBPs: 11 premier schools, 46 science secondary schools, 13 integrated SBPs and 3 federal Islamic secondary school. 6 of SBPs are all-boys and another 6 are all-girls. The latest SBP opened in Malaysia was Tanah Merah Integrated Boarding School (INTERA), opened in 2026 in Tanah Merah, Kelantan.

== Traditions ==
The history of SBP is a rich one, and certain fields are considered the hallmark of SBP schools. These include:

- Fully Residential School Excellence Day (Hari Kecemerlangan SBP, HKSBP)
- Prime Minister's Trophy Debate Championship (Pertandingan Bahas ala Parlimen Piala Perdana Menteri, PPM)
- SBP Wind Orchestra Competition (SBPWOC)
- SBP 7's Rugby Annual Championship
- Islamic Leadership Conference (Nadwah Kepimpinan Islam, NKI)
- Malaysia International Young Inventors Olympiad (MIYIO)
- Fully Residential Schools' International Symposium (FRSIS)
- Malay Gamelan and Caklempong Competition

== List of fully residential schools in Malaysia ==
As of 2023, Malaysia has 71 fully residential schools which are later divided into five zones, namely Northern Zone, Central Zone, Southern Zone, Eastern Zone and SQL Zone.

No.	Name of School	Shortform(s)	Zone	Location	Est.	Motto	Official Website
1	Kolej Islam Sultan Alam Shah; Sultan Alam Shah Islamic College	KISAS	Central	Klang, Selangor	1955	Fastaqim Kama Umirta (So remain on a right course as you have been commanded)	
2	Kolej Melayu Kuala Kangsar; The Malay College Kuala Kangsar	MCKK	North	Kuala Kangsar, Perak	1905	Fiat Sapientia Virtus (Manliness through Wisdom)	
3	Kolej Tunku Kurshiah; Tunku Kurshiah College	TKC	South	Nilai, Negeri Sembilan	1947	Rajin dan Usaha Tangga Kemajuan (Practice and Hard Work Make Perfect)	
4	Sekolah Berasrama Penuh Integrasi Batu Rakit; Batu Rakit Integrated Fully Residential School	BRAINS	East	Kuala Terengganu, Terengganu	2003	Berilmu, Berakhlak, Berkualiti (Knowledgeable, Virtuous, Quality)	
5	Sekolah Berasrama Penuh Integrasi Gombak; Gombak Integrated Fully Residential School	INTEGOMB	Central	Gombak, Selangor	2003	Benar, Tepat, Efektif (True, Correct, Effective)	
6	Sekolah Berasrama Penuh Integrasi Gopeng; Gopeng Integrated Fully Residential School	I-GOP	North	Gopeng, Perak	2003	Ilmu, Amal, Iman (Knowledge, Practice, Belief)	
7	Sekolah Berasrama Penuh Integrasi Jempol; Jempol Integrated Fully Residential School	INTEJ	South	Batu Kikir, Negeri Sembilan	2002	Ilmu Memantapkan Iman (Knowledge Strengthen Faith)	
8	Sekolah Berasrama Penuh Integrasi Kuantan; Kuantan Integrated Fully Residential School	INTEK	East	Kuantan, Pahang	2003	Membentuk Generasi Pemimpin (Shaping Leader's Generation)	
9	Sekolah Berasrama Penuh Integrasi Kubang Pasu; Kubang Pasu Integrated Fully Residential School	I-KUPS	North	Bukit Kayu Hitam, Kedah	2004	Cemerlang, Gemilang, Terbilang (Excellent, Glorious and Renowned)	
10	Sekolah Berasrama Penuh Integrasi Rawang; Rawang Integrated Fully Residential School	SEPINTAR	Central	Rawang, Selangor	2002	Sumber Penjana Muslim Bestari (Resources Generating Smart Muslims)	
11	Sekolah Berasrama Penuh Integrasi Sabak Bernam; Sabak Bernam Integrated Fully Residential School	INTESABER	Central	Sabak Bernam, Selangor	2002	Ilmu, Iman, Istiqamah (Knowledgeable, Faithful, Consistent)	
12	Sekolah Berasrama Penuh Integrasi Selandar; Selandar Integrated Fully Residential School	SISME	South	Selandar, Malacca	2003	Cemerlang, Berwawasan (Excellent with Aspiration)	
13	Sekolah Berasrama Penuh Integrasi Temerloh; Temerloh Integrated Fully Residential School	INSOFT	East	Temerloh, Pahang	2002	Ilmu, Iman, Amal (Knowledge, Faith, Practice)	
14	Sekolah Berasrama Penuh Integrasi Tun Abdul Razak; Tun Abdul Razak Integrated Fully Residential School	INSTAR	East	Pekan, Pahang	2003	Beyond Success	
15	Sekolah Dato' Abdul Razak; Tun Abdul Razak School	SDAR	South	Seremban, Negeri Sembilan	1956	Berilmu untuk Berjasa (To Learn and To Serve)	
16	Sekolah Menengah Agama Persekutuan Bentong; Bentong Federal Islamic Secondary School	SUPERB	East	Karak, Pahang	2013	Melangkaui Kecemerlangan (Above the Excellence)	
17	Sekolah Menengah Agama Persekutuan Kajang; Kajang Federal Islamic Secondary School	SMAPK	Central	Kajang, Selangor	1989	Ilmu, Iman, Amal	
18	Sekolah Menengah Agama Persekutuan Labu; Labu Federal Islamic Secondary School	SMAPL	South	Labu, Negeri Sembilan	1982	Ilmu, Iman, Amal	
19	Sekolah Menengah Sains Alam Shah; Alam Shah Science Secondary School	ASiS	Central	Bandar Tun Razak, Kuala Lumpur	2003	Kreatif, Innovatif, Produktif (Creative, Innovative, Productive)	
20	Sekolah Menengah Sains Bagan Datoh; Bagan Datoh Science Secondary School	SABDA	North	Bagan Datoh, Perak	2009	Unggul Terbilang (Renowned and Excellent)	
21	Sekolah Menengah Sains Banting; Banting Science Secondary School	BASiS	Central	Banting, Selangor	2012	Berilmu, Beramal, Berbakti (Knowledge, Practice, Service)	
22	Sekolah Menengah Sains Batu Pahat; Batu Pahat Science Secondary School	SEHEBAT	South	Batu Pahat, Johor	2012	Integriti, Kredibiliti, Innovatif (Integrity, Credibility, Innovation)	
23	Sekolah Menengah Sains Dungun; Dungun Science Secondary School	SMSD	East	Dungun, Terengganu	1982	Berilmu, Berdisiplin, Berbakti (Knowledge, Discipline, Service)	
24	Sekolah Menengah Sains Gua Musang; Gua Musang Science Secondary School	GUAMSS	East	Gua Musang, Kelantan	2015	Ilmu, Budi, Kebijaksanaan (Knowledge, Kindness, Wisdom)	
25	Sekolah Menengah Sains Hulu Selangor; Upper Selangor Science Secondary School	SEMASHUR	Central	Batang Kali, Selangor	2000	Usaha, Amal, Bakti (Effort, Practice, Service)	
26	Sekolah Menengah Sains Hulu Terengganu; Upper Terengganu Science Secondary School	SAHUT	East	Kuala Berang, Terengganu	2011	Menjana Kecemerlangan Jati Diri (Generating Self-Excellence)	
27	Sekolah Menengah Sains Jeli; Jeli Science Secondary School	JESS	East	Jeli, Kelantan	2013	Ilmu, Amal, Taqwa (Knowledge, Practice, Piety)	
28	Sekolah Menengah Sains Johor; Johor Science Secondary School	SMSJ	South	Kluang, Johor	1973	Budi, Karya, Bakti (Virtue, Effort, Service)	
29	Sekolah Menengah Sains Kepala Batas; Kepala Batas Science Secondary School	SAKBA	North	Kepala Batas, Penang	2009	Kualiti Pemangkin Kecemerlangan (Quality Generates Excellence)	
30	Sekolah Menengah Sains Kota Tinggi; Kota Tinggi Science Secondary School	SAKTI	South	Kota Tinggi, Johor	1996	Ilmu, Bakti, Kualiti (Knowledge, Service, Quality)	
31	Sekolah Menengah Sains Kuala Selangor; Kuala Selangor Science Secondary School	KUSESS	Central	Kuala Selangor, Selangor	1996	Berilmu, Beramal, Berbakti	
32	Sekolah Menengah Sains Kuala Terengganu; Kuala Terengganu Science Secondary School	SESTER	East	Kuala Terengganu, Terengganu	2000	Menjana Kecemerlangan Jati Diri	
33	Sekolah Menengah Sains Kubang Pasu; Kubang Pasu Science Secondary School	KUPSIS	North	Jitra, Kedah	2009	Sukses, Kreatif, Produktif (Success, Creativity, Innovation)	
34	Sekolah Menengah Sains Kuching; Kuching Science Secondary School	SAINSKU	SQL	Kuching, Sarawak	1994	Berilmu, Berwawasan (Knowledgeable and Visionary)	
35	Sekolah Menengah Sains Kuching Utara; North Kuching Science Secondary School	SAKURA	SQL	Kuching, Sarawak	2013	Ilmu, Integriti, Iltizam (Knowledge, Integrity, Commitment)	
36	Sekolah Menengah Sains Labuan; Labuan Science Secondary School	SMEXCEL	SQL	Sungai Pagar, Labuan	1985	Usaha, Jaya, Bakti (Effort, Success and Service)	
37	Sekolah Menengah Sains Lahad Datu; Lahad Datu Science Secondary School	SHIELD	SQL	Lahad Datu, Sabah	1988	Berilmu, Bersatu, Terus Maju (Knowledge and Unity: Strive Ahead)	
38	Sekolah Menengah Sains Machang; Machang Science Secondary School	SMACH	East	Machang, Kelantan	1983	Berilmu, Berusaha, Berbakti (Knowledge, Effort, Practice)	
39	Sekolah Menengah Sains Miri; Miri Science Secondary School	SAINSRI	SQL	Miri, Sarawak	1990	Berusaha, Berilmu, Beramal (Work Hard, Be Knowledgeable and Practice)	
40	Sekolah Menengah Sains Muar; Science Muar Science Secondary School	SAMURA	South	Tangkak, Johor	1983	Berilmu, Berbakti (Knowledge and Service)	
41	Sekolah Menengah Sains Muzaffar Syah; Muzaffar Syah Science Secondary School	MOZAC	South	Ayer Keroh, Malacca	1973	Bersikap Membina (Be Constructive)	
42	Sekolah Menengah Sains Pasir Puteh; Pasir Puteh Science Secondary School	SCIPP	East	Pasir Puteh, Kelantan	1998	Ilmu, Amal, Gemilang (Knowledge, Practice, Excellence)	
43	Sekolah Menengah Sains Tuanku Aishah Rohani; Seremban Girls' School	SGS	South	Seremban, Negeri Sembilan	2014	Modal Insan Aspirasi Negara (Human Capital Aspired by the Nation)	
44	Sekolah Menengah Sains Pokok Sena; Pokok Sena Science Secondary School	SAINA	North	Pokok Sena, Kedah	1995	Berilmu, Beramal, Bertaqwa (Knowledge, Practice, Piety)	
45	Sekolah Menengah Sains Raja Tun Azlan Shah; Raja Tun Azlan Shah Science Secondary School	SERATAS	North	Taiping, Perak	1982	Berdisiplin, Berilmu, Berbakti (Discipline, Knowledge, Service)	
46	Sekolah Menengah Sains Rembau; Rembau Science Secondary School	SEMESRA	South	Rembau, Negeri Sembilan	2009	Tekun, Bersatu, Berjaya, Terbilang (Work Hard, Unite, Be Renowned and Successful)	
47	Sekolah Menengah Sains Sabah; Sabah Science Secondary School	SMESH	SQL	Tuaran, Sabah	1984	Teguh, Setia, Budi (Strength, Loyalty, Virtue)	
48	Sekolah Menengah Sains Selangor; Selangor Science Secondary School	SMSS	Central	Bandar Tun Razak, Kuala Lumpur	1973	Budi, Usaha, Bakti (Virtue, Diligence, Service)	
49	Sekolah Menengah Sains Sembrong; Sembrong Science Secondary School	SASEM	South	Kluang, Johor	2011	Ihsan, Ilmu, Khalifah (Kindness, Knowledge, Vicegerency)	
50	Sekolah Menengah Sains Seri Puteri; Seri Puteri Science Secondary School	SESERI	Central	Sentul, Kuala Lumpur	2003	Proaktif, Innovatif, Efektif (Proactive, Innovatione and Effective)	
51	Sekolah Menengah Sains Setiu; Setiu Science Secondary School	SAIS	East	Setiu, Terengganu	2011	Ilmu, Sahsiah, Gemilang (Knowledge, Personality, Excellence)	
52	Sekolah Menengah Sains Sultan Haji Ahmad Shah; Sultan Haji Ahmad Shah Science Secondary School	SEMSAS	East	Kuantan, Pahang	1973	Hidup Berjasa (Live to Serve)	
53	Sekolah Menengah Sains Sultan Iskandar; Sultan Iskandar Science Secondary School	ISKANDAR	South	Mersing, Johor	2003	Sepakat, Bestari, Progresif, Innovatif (Unite, Be Smart, Progressive and Innovative)	
54	Sekolah Menengah Sains Sultan Mahmud; Sultan Mahmud Science Secondary School	SESMA	East	Kuala Nerus, Terengganu	1973	Dissiplin, Kualiti, Dedikasi (Discipline, Quality, Dedication)	
55	Sekolah Menengah Sains Sultan Mohamad Jiwa; Sultan Mohamad Jiwa Science Secondary School	SMADJIWA	North	Sungai Petani, Kedah	1973	Berilmu dan Berbudi (Be Knowledgeable and Virtuous)	
56	Sekolah Menengah Sains Tapah; Tapah Science Secondary School	SESTA	North	Tapah, Perak	2010	Berilmu, Bertakwa (Be Knowledgeable and Faithful)	
57	Sekolah Menengah Sains Teluk Intan; Teluk Intan Science Secondary School	SEMESTI	North	Teluk Intan, Perak	1984	Ilmu Teras Hidup (Knowledge Source of Life)	
58	Sekolah Menengah Sains Tengku Abdullah; Tengku Abdullah Science Secondary School	SEMESTA	East	Raub, Pahang	1983	Ilmu, Amal, Budi (Knowledge, Practice, Virtue)	
59	Sekolah Menengah Sains Tengku Muhammad Faris Petra; Tengku Muhammad Faris Petra Science Secondary School	FARIS	East	Kota Bharu, Kelantan	1973	Sains Asas Kemajuan (Science Source of Development)	
60	Sekolah Menengah Sains Tuanku Jaafar; Tuanku Jaafar Science Secondary School	STJ	South	Kuala Pilah, Negeri Sembilan	1973	Maju Sempurna (Developed and Perfect)	
61	Sekolah Menengah Sains Tuanku Munawir; Tuanku Munawir Science Secondary School	SASER	South	Seremban, Negeri Sembilan	2002	Berilmu, Beriman, Berbakti (Knowledge, Faith, Service)	
62	Sekolah Menengah Sains Tuanku Syed Putra; Syed Putra Science Secondary School	SYED PUTRA	North	Kangar, Perlis	1973	Tekun, Usaha, Jaya (Diligence, Effort, Success)	
63	Sekolah Menengah Sains Tun Syed Sheh Shahabudin; Tun Syed Sheh Shahabudin Science Secondary School	TUN SYED	North	Bukit Mertajam, Penang	1973	Ilmu Asas Kemajuan (Knowledge is the Foundation of Development)	
64	Sekolah Menengah Sultan Abdul Halim; Sultan Abdul Halim Secondary School	SMSAH	North	Jitra, Kedah	1963	Belajar dan Berbakti (Learn and Serve)	
65	Sekolah Sains Sultan Haji Ahmad Shah Pekan; Sultan Haji Ahmad Shah Science School, Pekan	SHAH PEKAN	East	Pekan, Pahang	1989	Ilmu, Amal, Budi	
66	Sekolah Seri Puteri; Seri Puteri School	SSP	Central	Cyberjaya, Selangor	1968	Ilmu, Usaha, Jaya (Knowledge, Hard Work, Excellence)	
67	Sekolah Sultan Alam Shah; Sultan Alam Shah School	SAS	Central	Precinct 1, Putrajaya	1963	Chita, Usaha, Jaya (Vision, Hard Work and Excellence)	
68	Sekolah Tuanku Abdul Rahman; Tuanku Abdul Rahman School	STAR	North	Ipoh, Perak	1957	Ilmu Panduan Hidup (Knowledge is the Guidance of Life)	
69	Sekolah Tun Fatimah; Tun Fatimah School	STF	South	Johor Bahru, Johor	1956	Berusaha Tangga Kejayaan (Strive to Excel)	
70	Akademi Sains Pendang; Pendang Science Academy	ASP	North	Pendang, Kedah	2021	Nurturing Leaders in Humanising Technology	[67]
71	Sekolah Menengah Sains Datuk Setia Abdul Ghani Ali; Datuk Setia Abdul Ghani Ali Science Secondary School	SAGA	South	Alor Gajah, Melaka	2023	Beriman, Berilmu, Berjasa (faithful, knowledgeable, and charitable)	
72	Sekolah Menengah Sains Segamat; Segamat Science Secondary School	SESS	South	Batu Anam, Johor	2024	Holistik, Inovatif, Progresif (Holistic, Innovative, Progressive)	

== See also ==
- Education in Malaysia
- MARA Junior Science College
