= SMS Banting =

- BASIS

Location
- Jalan Sultan Suleiman Shah, Jugra, 42700; Banting, Selangor; Malaysia

Information
- Type: Fully Residential School
- Motto: Berilmu, Beramal, Berbakti; Knowledgeable, Practise, Serve
- Established: 2011
- Principal: TBD
- Grades: Form 1 - Form 5
- Gender: Male and Female
- Enrolment: approx. 900
- Classes: Al-Biruni, Al-Farabi, Al-Hasseb, Al-Jahiz, Al-Khindi, Ar-Razi, At-Thaury
- Houses: Uranium; Titanium; Radium; Plutonium
- Slogan: Inspiring Excellence, Leading Others
- Yearbook: Al-Caliph
- Alumni: BASIS Old Student Society (BOSS)
- Website: basis.edu.my

Sekolah Menengah Sains Banting (English: Banting Science Secondary School; abbreviated BASIS) is a boarding school in Banting, Selangor. It is one of the Sekolah Berasrama Penuh (SBP), or fully residential boarding schools, in Malaysia and is the only one in its district (Kuala Langat).

== History ==
The school was inaugurated on 17 November 2011. It became fully operational on 22 January 2012. Tuan Haji Muhamad Kamaludin bin Taib is the first and current principal of Sekolah Menengah Sains Banting. At that time, the school had only two batches. By 31 January 2012, the school had received approximately 200 new Form 4 (2012) students. The school began its first year with three batches. Under the management of Tuan Haji Muhamad Kamaludin bin Taib, former principal of Sekolah Sultan Alam Shah and Sekolah Menengah Sains Tuanku Munawir, it began to rise in popularity with participation in co-curricular activities and academic achievements in Kuala Langat district level and SBP level. In 2012, the school adopted the motto, "From Zero to Hero". In 2014, the first batch of BASIS brought the name of the school to 22nd place out of 68 SBP. In 2015, batch Khattab 1314 had put BASIS at 13th place of 68 SBPs thus becoming among the 20 top schools for SPM 2014 in Malaysia.

In 2026, the school were among the first five school to implement TVET - AI program inside their syllabus.

== Introduction ==
Sekolah Menengah Sains Banting is 6 km (3.7 mi) from the town of Banting. The school covers about 24 acres (9.7 ha) of land in Jalan Sultan Suleiman Shah Jugra along with other institutions including Kuala Langat Community College, Selangor Matriculation College, and the Kuala Langat Industrial Training Institute. BASiS has a multi-purpose hall, academic block, residential block (both student and teachers), a mosque, a dining hall, and a canteen. The recreation and playground zones contain a football and rugby field, a hockey field, 2 basketball courts (both men and women), 2 tennis courts, 3 badminton courts, 2 sepak takraw courts, 2 volleyball courts, a grandstand and 3 badminton courts inside the hall. The mosque has had several renovations to accommodate greater numbers of students.

== Principals ==
The following individuals have served as principals of Sekolah Menengah Sains Banting:

- Kamaludin Taib (2012 – July 2017)
- Norsham Binti Nordin (September 2017 – December 2020)
- Rijaludin bin Che Mat (January 2021 – May 2022)
- Yusanizan bin Shafie (June 2022 – Present)

== Batch and academic performance ==
It is a tradition for any SBPs to have numerous batches. In BASiS, the name of every batch has a different meaning. Each of them strives together to achieve their best results in SPM during their senior year .

SPM year	Rank in SBP	Batch Name
2013	22 of 68	XENITH 1213
2014	13 of 68	KHATTAB 1314
2015	29 of 68	ZEALOUS 1115
2016	31 of 69	XANTHRON 1216
2017	29 of 69	ZIRCON 1317
2018	18 of 69	XCENTRIC 1418
2019		ZULTRAX 1519
2020		ISKANDAR ZULKARNAIN (IZ) 1620
2021		IBNU SINA (MOIS) 1721
2022		REVONIX 1822
2023		AL-FATEH 1923
2024	16 of 70	EMINENCE 2024
2025		AL-AMIN(AIMS) 2125
2026		EXCIS 2226
2027		AS-SIDDIQ(ASSID) 2327
2028		AL-ZARQALI 2428
2029		AL-AMEER 2529
2030		AL-ILMI 2630
