= SMS Rembau =

Coordinates: 2°31′26.6″N 102°02′57.1″E

- SEMESRA

Location
- Pilin, 73000; Rembau, selangor Malaysia

Information
- Type: Secondary school, Boarding school, Sekolah Berasrama Penuh, Mixed-gender education
- Motto: Tekun Bersatu Berjaya Terbilang; Zealous Unite Success Distinguished
- Established: 1 October 2009
- School district: Rembau
- Principal: Che Romas Binti Noor
- Grades: Form 1 - Form 5
- Enrollment: Approx. 850
- Classes: Al-Razi, Bandura, Chopin, Da Vinci, Einstein, Frost,
- Language: Malay, English
- Colours: Maroon, Black and White
- Yearbook: Mutiara SEMESRA
- Affiliation: Sekolah Berasrama Penuh, Ministry of Education (Malaysia)
- Houses: Kelana Petra; Akhirul Zaman; Johan Pahlawan; Lela Maharaja
- Website: www.smsainsrembau.blogspot.com

Sekolah Menengah Sains Rembau (English: Rembau Science Secondary School; abbreviated SEMESRA) is a co-educational secondary school situated in the district of Rembau and among fully residential schools (Sekolah Berasrama Penuh) in the state of Negeri Sembilan, Malaysia. Established in 2009, the school is widely known as SEMESRA.

In PMR examination on 2013, the school produced 108 straight A's students with GPS 1.0535 to become the third best school in Negeri Sembilan.

On 30 October 2014, SEMESRA was awarded with the Sekolah Berprestasi Tinggi or High Performance School title.

== History ==
Sekolah Menengah Sains Rembau, Negeri Sembilan (SEMESRA) was established on 1 October 2009. On 5 January 2010, the first principal, Azam bin Md Atan, registered for duty as the Super Principal of SEMESRA. He was assisted by the Vice Principals; Baharudin Husin (Academics), Azman Awang (Student Affairs), and Roslina Aziz (Co-curriculum). The institution's first intake of students was on 16 November 2009 when 130 Form One students registered.

Now, the school caters to more than 850 students.

In 2011, SEMESRA students sat for their first public examinations, with Extrovert 0913 batch sat for PMR while Valedictorian 1011 batch sat for SPM. The first SPM result sat by Valedictorian 1011 managed to place SEMESRA in the 7th spot nationwide, with a GPS of 1.3006 among other elite schools in the SPM 2011 ranking.

In 2012, with a GPS of 1.0408, 119 out of 150 students received straight A's in the PMR 2011 examinations, allowing SEMESRA to be ranked in the 9th spot nationwide and became the second best school in Negeri Sembilan that year.

SEMESRA was awarded Sekolah Berprestasi Tinggi award on 30 October 2014.

== Location ==
The new campus is located opposite to a housing area, Taman Desa Permai Kundur, some 7 km from the North-South Expressway (Pedas-Linggi exit), 12 km from the Rembau town, and 38 km from the town of Seremban.

== Principals ==
- 2009–2011: Azam Md Atan
- 2011–2017: Norzila Idris
- 2018–2022: Zainah binti Ahmad Sisman
- 2023–2024: Che' Romas binti Noor
- 2025–present: Narizan binti Mamat

== Bullying Case ==
In October 2019, an article written by Hariz Mohd on Malaysiakini reported a bullying case that involved an "Orang Asli" student. It was reported that the student had told their father in early August and on the 29th of August he was brought to Hospital Tuanku Ja'afar where he spent 5 (five) days warded.
