= SMS Tuanku Syed Putra =

- SYED PUTRA
- Kangar, Perlis; Malaysia

Information
- Type: Secondary school, Boarding school, Sekolah Berasrama Penuh, Mixed-gender education
- Motto: Tekun Usaha Jaya (Assiduous, Efforts, Success )
- Established: 1973
- School district: Kangar
- Principal: Masodiah Binti Mahfodz@mahfod
- Grades: Form 1 - Form 5
- Classes: (Lower Form) Itqan, Ihsan, Ikhlas, Iltizam - (Upper Form Pure Science) Baiduri, Delima, Sarjana, (Upper Form Technical Science/ Pure Science) Cendekia
- Language: Malay, English
- Houses: Marikh (red), Musytari (green), Zuhal (yellow), Zuhrah (blue)
- Colours: Yellow, Green and Blue
- Song: Tekun Usaha Jaya
- Yearbook: Puteraindera
- Affiliation: Sekolah Berasrama Penuh, Ministry of Education (Malaysia),
- Alumni: ASPUTRA
- Website: www.smstsp.edu.my

Sekolah Menengah Sains Tuanku Syed Putra (English: Syed Putra Science Secondary School; abbreviated SYED PUTRA; formerly known as Sekolah Menengah Sains Perlis) is a premier boarding school located in Kangar, Perlis, Malaysia. In 2010, the school was awarded the Sekolah Berprestasi Tinggi or High Performance School award, a title awarded to the 20 schools in Malaysia that have met stringent criteria including academic achievement, strength of alumni, international recognition, network and linkages.

The school specialises in rugby, cricket, soccer, innovation and invention. The school's performance in the Penilaian Menengah Rendah (2013) was the best in Perlis and ranked fourteenth among the Sekolah Berasrama Penuh with 76.92% students gaining straight A's and GPS rating of 1.0526 while Sijil Pelajaran Malaysia was the best in Perlis with 30 students obtaining straight A's.

== History ==
The school were opened on 1973. In June 1981, the school hosted Kelas Matrikulasi Sains, preparing students for their first year at Universiti Sains Malaysia
