= SMS Tuanku Jaafar =

- STJ

Location
- Kuala Pilah, Negeri Sembilan; Malaysia; 2°45′17″N 102°14′41″E

Information
- Type: Secondary residential school (Sekolah Berasrama Penuh)
- Motto: Maju Sempurna
- Established: 1973
- School district: Kuala Pilah
- Principal: Encik Ilham Muizzudin
- Grades: Form 1 - Form 5
- Gender: Mixed-gender education
- Classes: Al-Batani; Al-Farabi; Al-Farghani; Al-Khawarizmi; Al-Zahrawi
- Language: Malay, English
- Houses: Tunku Kurshiah (yellow); Tunku Burhanuddin (blue); Raja Melewar (red); Raja Hitam (green)
- Colours: Yellow and red
- Song: Maju Sempurna
- Yearbook: Pesaka
- Affiliation: Sekolah Berasrama Penuh, Ministry of Education (Malaysia)
- Alumni: Persatuan Alumni Sekolah Menengah Sains Tuanku Jaafar (PRESSTiJ)

Sekolah Menengah Sains Tuanku Jaafar (Tuanku Jaafar Science Secondary School; abbreviated STJ) is a fully residential schools (Sekolah Berasrama Penuh) in the state of Negeri Sembilan, Malaysia. Established in 1973 under the Second Malaysia Plan, it is the state's first Science School. The school is widely known as STJ. In 2012, the school was awarded with the Sekolah Berprestasi Tinggi or High Performance School title, a title awarded to schools in Malaysia that have met stringent criteria including academic achievement, strength of alumni, international recognition, network and linkages.

== History ==
The school was established in 1973 with the buildings on the current location were completed in 1975. The establishment aims was to provide science education to rural Bumiputera. Formerly known as Sekolah Menengah Sains Negeri Sembilan (SMSNS), it was one of 10 SBP's on a trial basis in 1973 to comply with the aspirations of the New Economic Policy (NEP) as described in the Red Book of the Second Malaysia Plan 1971–1975. In 1982, the name was changed to Sekolah Tuanku Jaafar (STJ) after it was officially opened by the Yang Dipertuan Besar Negeri Sembilan at that time, Almarhum Tuanku Ja'afar Tuanku Abdul Rahman. In 1994, the school was renamed to Sekolah Menengah Sains Tuanku Jaafar (SMSTJ). However, the initials STJ is still being used to this day. The first group of students (The Pioneer) in 1973 stayed in the hostels and went to classes in King George V School, Seremban up to 1975 before moving to the current location in Kg. Gentam, Kuala Pilah, Negeri Sembilan.

The school created its own e-wallet services in 2020, becoming the first SBP to do so.

== Notable Students ==
- Razman al-Qadri - Current Tunku Besar Tampin
