= SMS Sembrong =

- SASEM

Location
- J16, Jalan Padang Tembak; Kluang, Johor; Malaysia

Information
- Type: Secondary school, Boarding school, Sekolah Berasrama Penuh, Mixed-gender education
- Motto: Ihsan Ilmu Khalifah (Courtesy, Knowledge, Leadership)
- Established: 11 April 2011
- School district: Kluang, Johor
- Principal: En. Mohd Noh Bin Mohd Yussoff (2012-2014), Tn. Hj. Mohd Shariff bin Junidek (2014-2016), En. Rijaluddin bin Che Mat (2017-recent)
- Grades: Form 1 - Form 5
- Enrollment: ≈800-820
- Language: Malay, English
- Classrooms: Lower Forms: Ibn Kathir, Ibn Khaldun, Ibn Majjah, Ibn Sina, Ibn Qayyim, Ibn Rushd. Upper Forms: Abu Hanifah, Al-Farabi, Al-Ghazali, As-Syafie, Al-Bukhari, Al-Khawarizmi
- Houses: Tuanku Abdul Rahman (Blue), Tuanku Syed Putra (Red), Tuanku Hisamuddin (Yellow), Tuanku Ismail (Green)
- Colours: Blue, Red, Yellow and Green
- Affiliations: Sekolah Berasrama Penuh, Ministry of Education (Malaysia)
- Website: www.sainssemberong.com

Sekolah Menengah Sains Sembrong (English: Sembrong Science Secondary School; abbreviated SASEM) is a fully residential school (Sekolah Berasrama Penuh) in the state of Johor, Malaysia. The school was completed and officially handed over to the Ministry of Education in April 2011. The school is widely known as SASEM.

== History ==
Sekolah Menengah Sains Sembrong (Sembrong Secondary Science School) or SASEM for short is a newly established fully residential school in Kluang, Johor. The school was completed and officially handed over to the Ministry of Education in April 2011.

The first batch of students registered just before the year end school holidays in November 2021. They returned as Form 2 students in January 2011.

== Buildings ==
SASEM is a big school; the total area is more than 60 acres. The hostels can accommodate a maximum of 896 students. The school complex is divided into two areas, one area for the academic and administrative buildings and the other for the hostels. The two areas are separated by a small stream which the school cannot do anything about because it is under the jurisdiction of the Water and Drainage Department. It takes about a 5 minutes walk from the hostel to the academic building.

== Principals ==
- En. Mohd Noh Bin Hj Mohd Yussof (2012-2014)
- Tn. Haji Mohd Shariff Bin Junidek (2014-2016)
- En. Rijaludin Bin Che Mat (2017-2020)
- En. Rozlan Bin Zulkifli (2021-2023)
- En. Mazlan Bin Sarieyo (2024-recent)

== Head boys and head girls ==
Year	Head Boy	Head Girl	Dep. Head Boy	Dep. Head Girl	Head Prefect	Dep.Head Prefect	Main Hostel Leader	Dep. Hostel Leader	Head of Badar	Dep. Head of Badar	Head of PRS	Dep. Head of PRS	Head of Briged	Dep. Head of Briged
12-13	Amir Zaim Razali	Nur Mastura Rahmat	Mohd Syahmi Sukeri	Nur Hafisah Yahya										
13-14	Ahmad Fahmi Md Yusof	Nor Al-Shuhadah Sabarudin	Mohd Suhaimi Bin Samad	Nurul Aimi Athirah Juarimi										
14-15	Mohd Ikmal Zamri	Iwana Haidah Hamdan	Amir Harith Saipolyazan	Umi Amirah										
15-16	Mohd Fahmi Ismail	Nur Irdina 'Amirah	Ahmad Fa'id Ariffin	Nur Suhadah Kahar										
16-17	Mohd Aliff Nazmie A.Asmadi	Noor Izatul Hanom Nordin	Mohd Izzami Jemain	Intan Nazihah Ismail										
17-18	Amir Syazwan Bin Zaily	Nuraqeela Putri Binti Mohamad Zameri	Ahmad Najwan Nordin	Aineen Sofea Tajul Ariffin										
18-19	Wan Ilham Nurhakim Bin A'zali	Alia Maisarah Binti Abdul Razak	Muhamad Husaini Bin Hasnan	Su Mahirah Binti Sugiman										
19-20	Raja Nornajmi Bin Raja Azman	Ainul Syakila Binti Ismail	Akmal Hakim Bin Ahmad Tahlim	Nurain Nadiah Binti Asmadi										
20-21	Mohd Ikhwanuddin Bin	Ain Qhalida Binti Ishak	Mohd Syahmi Bin Rosli	Galuh Chendana Qirana Binti Sulhan										
22-23														
24-25	Muhammad Darwish Hafiy bin Paizal	Nur Dini Haziqa Binti Husaini	Muhammad Adam Naufal Bin Saiadon	Hana Wafa Binti Hisyamuddin	Muhammad Hafiz Haqime Bin Nasre	Fariesha Humaira Binti Muhamad Haris	Muhammad Aidil Danish Bin Hairul Nizam	Amielda Elisha Binti Awang Kechil	Aniq Zuhair Bin Adli Azamin	Nur Alya Umairah Binti Zulfadli	Ahmad Hadif Bin Yusmaini	Nur Afriena Hafnie Binti Mohd Norazril	Ahmad Arif Farhan Bin Ahmad Shahir	Dhia Dania Binti uzir

== Hostels ==
SASEM hostels have the capacity to house 896 students. There are only two blocks, one for girls and one for boys. There are 56 rooms in each hostels and each room have the capacity to house 8 students. There are two restrooms in each floors. The room allocations are according to houses. The students would be distributed according to their houses. Each room would consists members of the same house but different forms.
