= SMS Tengku Muhammad Faris Petra =

- SMSTMFP

Location
- 16100 Pengkalan Chepa, Kelantan; Pengkalan Chepa, Kelantan, 16100; Malaysia; 6.154465°N 102.298336°E

Information
- Type: Secondary school, Boarding school, Sekolah Berasrama Penuh, mixed-gender education
- Motto: Sains Asas Kemajuan (Science, the foundation of progress)
- Established: 1973
- School code: DEE1415
- Principal: Ahmad Bin Tajab (2020)
- Teaching staff: 78
- Enrollment: 763 (2008)
- Classes: Alpha, Beta, Delta, Gamma, Lambda
- Student to teacher ratio: 9.8 : 1
- Language: Bahasa Melayu; English
- Houses: Mahathir, Rahman, Razak
- Colours: Red, blue, yellow and green
- Nickname: Faris
- Yearbook: Semasa
- Alumni: FARIS PETRA

Sekolah Menengah Sains Tengku Muhammad Faris Petra (English: Tengku Muhammad Faris Petra Science Secondary School; abbreviated SMSTMFP; previously known as Sekolah Menengah Sains Kelantan (1973–1986) and Sekolah Menengah Tengku Muhammad Faris Petra (1986–1995)) is a premier government-funded secondary boarding school (Sekolah Berasrama Penuh) in Pengkalan Chepa in the state of Kelantan, Malaysia, for selected students aged thirteen to seventeen. Its students bear the name Farisian. The school is named after Tengku Muhammad Faris Petra, Kelantanese prince (later become Sultan of Kelantan).

Established in 1973 under the Second Malaysia Plan in accordance of Malaysian New Economic Policy, the school is located about 9 km northeast of the state capital, Kota Bharu and about 1.5 km southeast of the Sultan Ismail Petra Airport. In 2011, the school was awarded with the Sekolah Berprestasi Tinggi or High Performance School title, a title awarded to schools in Malaysia that have met stringent criteria including academic achievement, strength of alumni, international recognition, network and linkages. In the 2011 PMR examination, the school produced 112 students with straight A's out of 148 (75.68%) with GPS of 1.05 and become the best in Kelantan.

Faris Petra focuses predominantly on natural and pure science subjects such as Biology, Chemistry and Physics. However, a range of additional subjects are offered for interested students including Principles of Accounting and Visual Arts in SPM. Other than science, it is mandatory to each student to learn a third language from the choice of Arabic, French, Mandarin or Japanese. Students are allowed to take more than one extra language.

== History ==
Faris Petra is one of the ten new residential science schools built by the Malaysian Government in the wake of the 1971 Malaysian New Economic Policy to give science education to selected pupils, predominantly Malays. Its original name was Sekolah Menengah Sains Kelantan, which means Kelantan Secondary Science School.

It officially opened in 1973 with six classes and eleven teachers, but the students had to reside in the nearby Sekolah Menengah Ismail Petra (SMIP) until the present campus was ready at the start of 1974.

In 1986 the name was changed to Tengku Muhammad Faris Petra Science Secondary School, named after the crown prince of Kelantan, His Royal Highness Tengku Muhammad Faris Petra.

In 2012, the school have been honoured with Premier SBP title which grant itself to stand tall with other premier SBP such as MCKK, STF and STAR.

In 2016, the school have been chosen as IB Middle Years Programme world school.

== Notable alumni ==
- Hamim Samuri, Member of Parliament for Ledang in Johor state.
- Jafri Malin Abdullah, The founder of Neuroscience department of Universiti Sains Malaysia (USM).
- Hannan Mohd Yusof - Hannan Medispa founder

Earlier, alumni association acronyms were SEMESTA later changed to FARISAINS in 2009 to better reflect the school's name. Then, in 2012, the acronym was changed again to FARIS PETRA.
