= Kajang Federal Religious Secondary School =

- Sekolah Menengah Agama Persekutuan Kajang

Location
- Batu 13, Jalan Cheras, 43000 Kajang; Kajang, Selangor; Malaysia

Information
- Type: Public Islamic boarding school
- Motto: 'Strives for Excellence' (Knowledge, Believe, Pray)
- Established: 1 December 1989
- School district: Kajang
- Colours: Green, Yellow and Blue
- Yearbook: An-Nur
- Affiliations: Sekolah Berasrama Penuh, Ministry of Education (Malaysia)

Kajang Federal Religious Secondary School (Malay: Sekolah Menengah Agama Persekutuan Kajang) (SMAPK or SMAP Kajang) is a boarding school located in Kajang, Selangor. SMAPK is one of the popular Islamic boarding schools in Malaysia. SMAPK was established on 1 December 1989 as one of the three religious Fully Residential Schools (Fully Boarding School, or SBP) under the School Sector and Department of Islamic Education and Moral (JAPIM) in the Ministry of Education, Malaysia.

== History ==
During its early establishment, SMAPK was temporarily posted at Sekolah Menengah Agama Persekutuan Labu, Negeri Sembilan for about 6 months. The registration for the first students intake for this school was held on 13 January 1990. 153 students of Form 1 had registered and received their learning from only 5 teachers including the first principal, En. Mohd. Saim Ithnin. On 12 July 1990, finally SMAPK moved out to their own site situated in Batu 13, Jalan Cheras, Kajang, Selangor. Two days after, SMAPK members had increased due to the registration of 192 Form 4 students. On 4 September 1990, as much as 39 students were registered to the lower Form 6 which gave a total number of students to 362, with 38 teachers and 6 supportive staffs. Until 27 February 2008 the number of SMAPK members had reached up to 721 students, 78 teachers and 22 supportive staffs. Since the establishment of SMAPK, it had been propelled by 6 principals.

== Alumni ==
The school have produced several distinguished alumni throughout its establishment.

- Mui'zzuddeen Mahyuddin - MLA for Hulu Bernam
- Saujana - Nasheed group
