= SMS Sultan Mohamad Jiwa =

Sekolah Menengah Sains Sultan Mohamad Jiwa
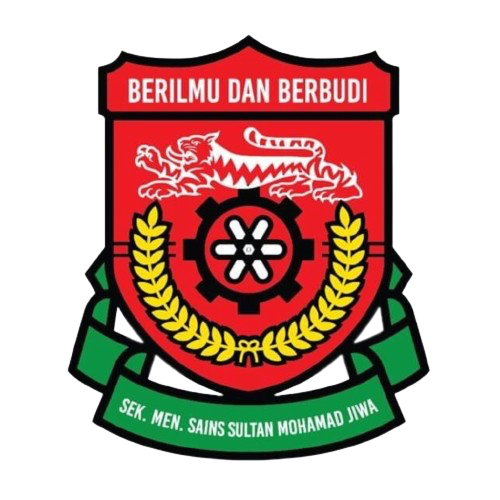

Location
- Jalan Badlishah; Sungai Petani, Kedah, 08000; Malaysia

Information
- Other name: Science Kedah, SMSSMJ, SMadJiwa
- Type: Public boarding school, Sekolah Berasrama Penuh
- Motto: Malay: Berilmu dan Berbudi (Knowledgeable and Meritorious)
- Established: 1973
- School code: KEE3105
- Houses: Bendahara; Laksamana; Panglima; Temenggung
- Colours: Red, Green, Yellow
- Yearbook: Rintisains
- Website: www.sciencekedah.edu.my

Sekolah Menengah Sains Sultan Mohamad Jiwa (English: Sultan Mohamad Jiwa Science School; abbreviated SMadJiwa) is a public boarding school, Sekolah Berasrama Penuh in Sungai Petani, Kedah, Malaysia. It was named after the nineteenth reigning Sultan of Kedah, Almarhum Kebawah Duli Yang Maha Mulia Sultan Mohamad Jiwa Zainal Adilin II.

== History ==
SMadJiwa was established in 1973 under the Second Malaysia Plan as Sekolah Menengah Sains Kedah. The school officiation took place on 6 November 1976. In 1984, the school was renamed as Sekolah Sultan Mohamad Jiwa. The inauguration of the new name was made by Kebawah Duli Yang Maha Mulia Sultan Abdul Halim Mu'adzam Shah ibni Almarhum Sultan Badlishah, the Sultan of Kedah.

This name was subsequently changed to Sekolah Menengah Sains Sultan Mohamad Jiwa in 1997 and remains until now. Students of the first batch was placed temporarily in several other schools in Perak such as SMK Anderson and SMJK Methodist Girls School and in Kedah such as SMK Khir Johari and Sungai Petani during the construction of the school building.

In 1974, after the building and school complex were completed and certified safe for occupation, the school started to commence its operation with a total of 35 teachers, 60 support staffs and 454 pupils.

In June 1981, the school hosted Kelas Matrikulasi Sains, preparing students for their first year at Universiti Sains Malaysia (USM).

== Principals ==
	Tenure	Principal
1.	1973	Encik Abdul Shukor bin Abdullah
2.	1979	Encik Mohd Ismail bin Othman
3.	1981	Encik Ishak bin Khamis
4.	1989	Haji Zakaria bin Haji Harun
5.	1995	Haji Ismail bin Ahmad
6.	1999	Haji Ali bin Ahmad
7.	2005	Haji Rusdin bin Husin
8.	2011	Encik Pesol bin Md Saad
9.	2017	Encik Harris Ganae bin Nainar
10.	2019	Tuan Haji Mohd Ghazali bin Ahmad
11.	2020	Puan Nadziroh binti Mohd Nadzim
12.	2023	Puan Noraini binti Mohamad Isa
13.	2025	Encik Ahmad Shahabudin Bin Ismail

== Alumni Association ==
The alumni association is ASSAK (Alumni Science Kedah). ASSAK was established by a former student and in recent years, the membership is automatically conferred upon graduation.

== Notable alumni ==
- Muhammad Sanusi Md Nor, 14th Menteri Besar of Kedah
- Saarani Mohamad, 13th Menteri Besar of Perak
- Wan Mohammad Khair-il Anuar, Member of Parliament for Kuala Kangsar, Perak
