= Sultan Alam Shah School =

All-boys Secondary School in Putrajaya, Malaysia

Sekolah Sultan Alam Shah
- سکوله سلطان عالم شاه

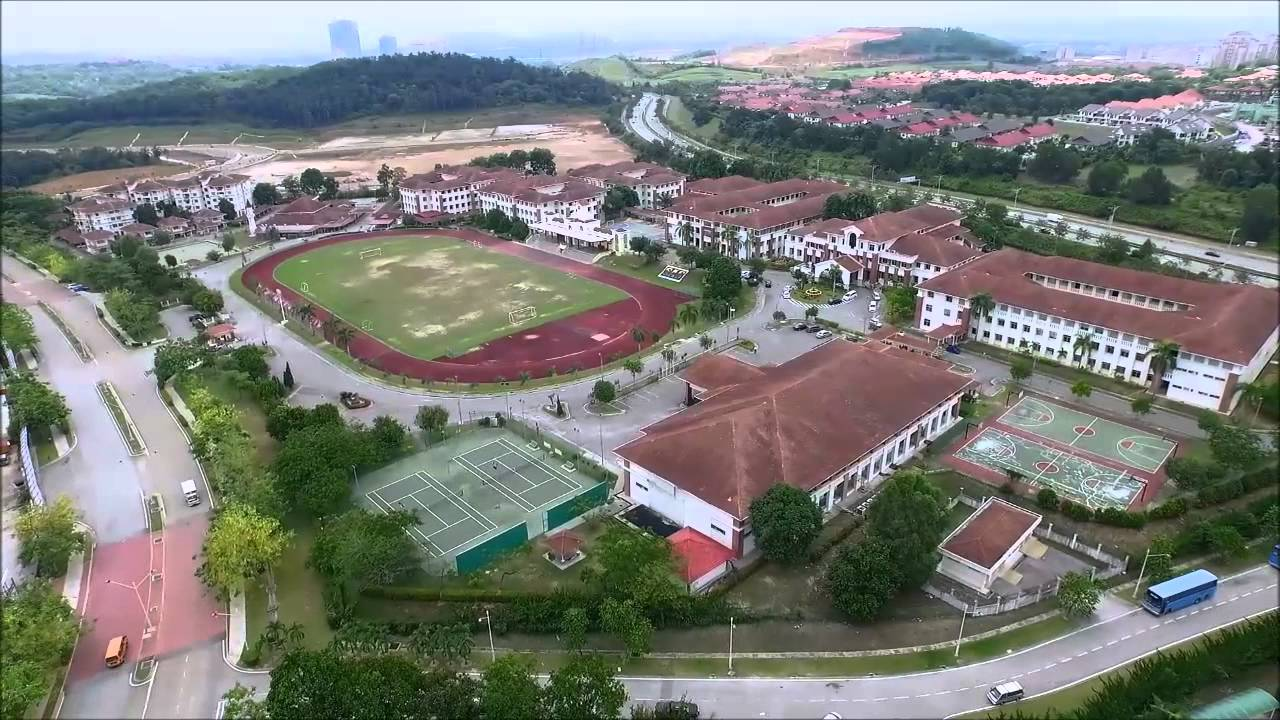
- Aerial view of SAS.

Location
- Precinct 1 Wilayah Persekutuan Putrajaya; Malaysia; 2°56′47″N 101°42′45″E

Information
- Other name: Sekolah Alam Shah, SAS
- School type: Secondary School, Sekolah Berasrama Penuh Premier (Premier SBP) All-Boys School
- Motto: Chita Usaha Jaya (Aspire, Strive and Succeed)
- Established: 7 February 1963
- School code: WEA2006
- Principal: Tn. Hj. Nor Azam bin Abdullah
- Grades: Form 1, Form 2, Form 3, Form 4, Form 5
- Gender: Male
- Age range: 13–17
- Capacity: 900
- Classes: Bestari, Cita, Dinamik, Jaya, Maju, Usaha
- Language: Malay, English
- Classrooms: 30 (6 for each Forms)
- Area: 142,000 m^{2} (1,530,000 sq ft)
- Houses: Dato Onn, Halimi, Jamil Rais, Hishamuddin, Aminuddin Baki and Zaaba
- Colors: Red, Blue, Yellow
- Song: Alam Shah Jaya
- Yearbook: Alunan Suara Alam Shah (ASAS)
- Affiliation: Sekolah Berasrama Penuh (SBP), School of Global Excellence (SGE), Sekolah Berprestasi Tinggi
- Royal Patron: Sultan Sharafuddin Idris Shah of Selangor
- Website: sas.edu.my

Sekolah Sultan Alam Shah or simply Alam Shah (abbreviated as SAS) is a fully residential school situated in Putrajaya, Malaysia. Sekolah Sultan Alam Shah is one of the schools in the country awarded with the title High Performance School and in 2014 was entitled as one of the 10 Schools of Global Excellence (SGE) by the Ministry of Education due to its academic merits, co-curricular achievements, strength of its alumnus, international recognition, broad network and vast linkages. The school is under the royal patronage of the Sultan of Selangor.

== History ==
Establishment

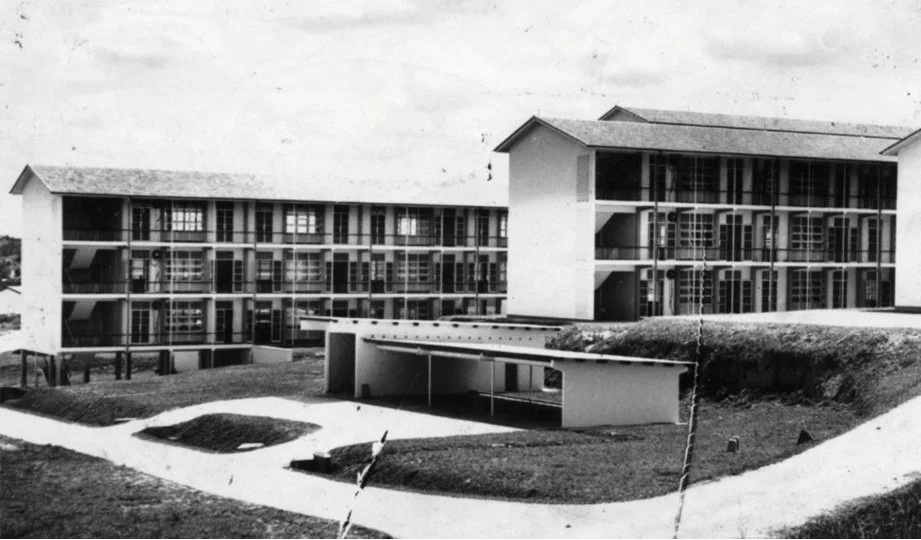
Old SAS campus located at Cheras.

Sekolah Sultan Alam Shah was introduced as a result of the Razak Report drafted in 1956, in line with the efforts of reforming the education system in the Federation of Malaya. It began its operations on 7 February 1963 and was launched by the late Sultan of Selangor, Sultan Salahudin Abdul Aziz. During its inception, SAS became the first secondary Malay school in Malaya to enroll a batch of Form 6 students, which gave the opportunity for Malay students from the middle-class to further their studies both locally and abroad. The old school campus was located at Bandar Tun Razak, Cheras, Kuala Lumpur.

Its first enrolment oversaw the intake of Form 4, Form 5 and Form 6 male students, as well as 8 female students in Lower Form 6. The trend of female intakes ended in 1974 as Sekolah Seri Puteri (SSP) had opened and started enrolling female students. During the same year, SAS started enrolling Form 1 students. SAS had also enrolled matriculation students from National University of Malaysia (UKM) from 1975 to 1998.

Moving to Putrajaya

There have been discussion to move the school when Kuala Lumpur were partioned from Selangor. In 1990, Muhammad Muhammad Taib, Menteri Besar of Selangor have proposed to move the school to Kuala Selangor. This however did not materialized.

Later, Prime Minister, Tun Dr Mahathir Mohamad proposed to move the school to Malaysia's new administrative capital, Putrajaya. The meeting between Mahathir and the former Secretary General of the Ministry of Finance, Tan Sri Samsuddin Hitam had led to the realisation of this idea. A 24-hectare land was approved as the site for SAS’ new campus. Construction works started in early 2001, and ended in 2003. At the size of 142,000 m^{2} (1,530,000 sq ft), the overall cost amounted to RM 54 million, which was considered the most expensive SBP ever built in Malaysia. The school gradually shifted from the Cheras campus to Putrajaya to make way for the oncoming opening ceremony.

On 25 April 2003, a total of 652 students migrated to the new campus . On 24 March 2006, the opening ceremony of the new campus were inaugurated by the current Sultan of Selangor, Sultan Sharafuddin Idris Shah, who also bestowed the name Sekolah Sultan Alam Shah to the school, which was based on the name of his grandfather, Sultan Hisamuddin Alam Shah. A year later, on 30 March 2007, SAS was granted the title Cluster School of Excellence (Malay: Sekolah Kluster Kecemerlangan) by the former Minister of Education, Dato’ Sri Hishamuddin Hussin. SAS was also named as a High Performance School (Malay: Sekolah Berprestasi Tinggi) on 25 January 2011.

On 7 February 2013, exactly 50 years after the establishment of SAS, the school celebrated its Golden Jubilee launched by Tan Sri Aseh Che Mat, President of Putrajaya Corporation who is also an alumnus of the school. The celebration was visited by the sixth Prime Minister, Dato Seri Najib Abdul Razak, who donated RM1 million to the school at the time of celebration, former Deputy Minister of Education Dr Mohd Puad Zarkashi and former Director General of Education Tan Sri Ghafar Mahmud. The celebration included a gala night, marching formations, performance by multiple groups such as Alam Shah Wind Orchestra (ASWO) and Gamelan Tradisional SAS (GATRASAS), as well as gallery walks relating to the history and performance of the school. The celebration also oversaw the participation of international visitors.

== Motto and Identity ==
Motto

SAS’ main motto is enshrined on its blazonry, which is ‘Chita, Usaha, Jaya’ (Aspire, Strive and Succeed). Other mottos include ‘SAS: Good to Great, Great to Exceptional’.

Blazonry

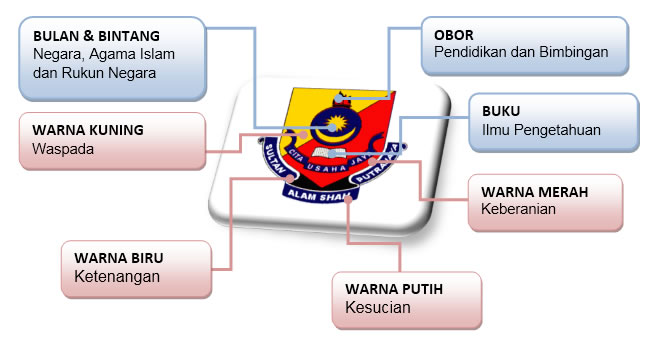
Infographic of SAS’ logo.

The logo consists of a red “Old French” escutcheon (shield) with yellow per bend sinister motive. A blue circle with the crescent and the 14-pointed Federal Star (Bintang Persekutuan) is located in the middle of the shield. Above the circle lies a glaring red flame of a torch. Below the circle, an opened book is placed. Located below the book is a small blue banderole bearing the motto of the school ‘Chita Usaha Jaya’.

Below the shield, a simple black compartment is added and a blue banderole containing the words “Sultan Alam Shah Putrajaya”, denoting the school's name, is included.

Each element bears their own meaning, which include:

- Torch – Education and Support
- Book – Knowledge
- Star and Crescent – The Country, Islam and the National Principles (Rukun Negara)
- Yellow – Cautious
- Blue – Calmness
- White – Pureness
- Red – Bravery

Flag

The flag is a simple dark blue field with the school's blazonry in the middle. The blue field represents unity and calmness, while the middle position of the blazonry indicates the thorough acceptance of education.

Official Anthem

The official anthem for SAS is ‘Alam Shah Jaya’ (English: Victorious Alam Shah). It was composed and lyricised by Oscar H. Batoebara, an Indonesian teacher.

Malay original

Sekolah Alam Shah megah berjasa
Membimbing satria harapan bangsa
Cita, Usaha, Jaya amalan kita
Jadi cogan kata setiap masa
Pelajar Alam Shah taat berbakti
Untuk nusa dan bangsa ibu pertiwi
Tuhan merestukan cita-cita mulia
Bertekad dan berdoa Alam Shah jaya

IPA transcription (Note: See Help:IPA/Malay and Malay phonology.)

[sə.ko.lah a.lam ʃah mə.gah bər.d͡ʒa.sa]
[məm.bim.bɪŋ sa.tri.ja ha.ra.pan baŋ.sa]
[tʃi.ta, u.sa.ha d͡ʒa.ja a.ma.lan ki.ta]
[d͡ʒa.di tʃo.gan ka.ta sə.ti.ap ̚ ma.sa]
[pə.la.d͡ʒar a.lam ʃah ta.at ̚ bər.baʔ ̚.ti]
[un.tuk ̚ nu.sa dan baŋ.sa i.bu per.ti.wi]
[tu.han mə.rəs ̚.tu.kan tʃi.ta tʃi.ta mu.lja]
[bər.tɛ.kad ̚ dan bər.do.a a.lam ʃah d͡ʒa.ja]

English translation

Sultan Alam Shah School, mighty and meritorious
Guiding warriors, the nation’s hope
Aspire, Strive and Succeed, our pledge
Becoming our slogan in any time
The students of Alam Shah are obedient and devoted
For the people and nation, our motherland
May God bless our noble aspirations
Strive and pray for the success of Alam Shah!

== Organisation ==
List of Principals

Principal	Years in Service
Haji Halimi Hj. Sharbaini	1963–1966
Prof. Dato' Dr. Ariffin Suhaimi	1967–1969
Dato' Hj. Mohd. Ghazali Hj. Hanafiah	1969 – June 1970
Dato' Haji Mahpor Baba	June 1970 – December 1970
Dato' Haji Ghazali Uda Omar	1971–1972
Haji Hamzah Salas	1972 – March 1978
Haji Baharom Othman	March 1978 – December 1978
Dato' Dr. Haji Harun Hassan	1979–1982
Haji Mohamad Ahmad Sani	1982–1985
Haji Abd. Rahman B. Mohd. Yunus	1985–1987
Haji Mohd. Razali B. Hj. Mahmud	1987–1990
Dato' Haji Abdul Raof B. Hussin	1990–1993
Haji Mohammed Zon B. Ramli	1993–1996
Haji Md. Yusoff B. Othman	1996–2003
Haji Shamsuddin B. Md Nor	2003–2005
Dato' Haji Khairil B. Awang	2005–2008
Haji Mohamad Kamaludin B. Taib	2008–2010
Ahmad Rosidi B. Ramley	2010–2012
Dato' Haji Haidzir B. Hussin	2013–2017
Salleh B. Ismail	2017–2019
Md Baharudin B. Mahani	2020–2021
Mursiedy B. Ab Hamid	2022–2023
Tn. Hj. Nor Azam B. Abdullah	2023–now

== Co-curricular activities ==
Rugby

The school is known for its strong rugby prowess. The school rugby team is one of the pioneers in Malaysian youth and grassroots rugby and has produced many accomplished rugby players nationwide. The school team participated in the Super Six Schools Rugby Tournament. The tournament is held among traditional rivals of the game which made up of the best rugby playing schools in Malaysia – Malay College Kuala Kangsar (MCKK), Sekolah Tuanku Abd Rahman (STAR) Ipoh, Sekolah Dato Abd Razak (SDAR) in Seremban, Sekolah Sultan Alam Shah (SAS) in Putrajaya, Sekolah Menengah Sains Selangor (SMSS) and Sekolah Menengah Sains Hulu Selangor (SEMASHUR).

Wind Orchestra

The Alam Shah Wind Orchestra (ASWO) was established in 1996. ASWO members are aged from 13- to 17-years'-old high school (all boys) students who started their music education from the most basic level upon joining the orchestra. The orchestra has won awards.

== Notable alumni ==
- Wan Saifulruddin Wan Jan - current MP for Tasek Gelugor
- Abu Bakar Mohamad Diah - Former Deputy Minister of Science, Technology and Innovation
- Norian Mai - the 6th Inspector-General of Police
- Zolkples Embong - Former Director of National Sports Council of Malaysia
- Noor Hisham Abdullah - Former Director-General of Health of Malaysia.
- Pkharuddin Ghazali - the 19th Director General of Education (Malaysia)
- Isham Jalil - engineer, politician
- Malique - composer
- Anwari Ashraf - producer, film director
- Zaki Zainal - News anchor
