= Miri Science Secondary School =

- Sekolah Menengah Sains Miri

Information
- Type: Boarding school, science school
- Motto: Berusaha Berilmu Beramal
- Established: 1 January 1990
- School code: YEA 4104
- Principal: Muhammad Syahmi Tan bin Abdullah
- Nickname: SMSM, SAINSri

Miri Science Secondary School (Malay: Sekolah Menengah Sains Miri) is a boarding science secondary school located in Miri, a city in the Malaysian state of Sarawak. The current principal is Dayang Laila Haji Kahar.

== Background ==
Miri Science Secondary School was established on 1 January 1990 and is the first ever boarding school in Sarawak. At that time, the first batches to register in the school were from Form 1, Form 4 and lower Form 6. There were only five teachers including the principal but then increased to 13 teachers. In 1995, the intake for lower Form 6 was stopped and replaced by the intake for the matriculation programmes of Universiti Kebangsaan Malaysia (UKM) with as many as 26 students. However, the programmes ended in 2000 after a new matriculation college is built in Labuan and is taken by the Ministry of Education (MOE).

== Administration and enrollment ==
Since its establishment, Miri Science Secondary School has been administrated by seven (7) principals, which were:

1. Zakiah Haji Omar (1 January 1990 - 15 July 1992)
2. Mohd Baharin Harun (16 September 1992 - 18 July 1997)
3. Hajah Rosey Haji Yunus (16 September 1997 - 2 May 2006)
4. Lily Haji Morni (16 June 2006 - 5 May 2009)
5. Hajah Serina Sauni (10 August 2009 - 22 February 2015)
6. Mohd Dzul Badzli Abdullah (12 June 2015 - 5 July 2020)
7. Dayang Laila Haji Kahar (since 25 September 2020)

The principal is helped by the School Supreme Governing Body (Malay : Badan Bertindak Tertinggi Sekolah (BBTS)) that is composed of the Senior Assistant of Administration, Senior Assistant of Students Affairs, Senior Assistant of Co-curriculum, Head of Science Department, Head of Language Department, Head of Vocational and Technic Department, Head of Humanity Department, and counsellors. Non-academic staffs are also tasked to help in managing the administration.

Currently, there are 48 teachers and are divided into panels according to the subjects taught. The teachers in the school are among the teachers that have at least a degree in consecutive fields.

The students in the school consist of Malay, Chinese, Indians and Sarawak Bumiputras such as Ibans, Kayan, Kenyah and others. There is a total of 460 registered students as of November 2020. This school only take students for Form 1 until Form 5 (13 to 17 years old). Each form or batch has four (4) classes, named Iltizam, Usaha, Maju and Jaya.

== Location ==
Miri Science Secondary School is located in Jalan Bakam, on an area with a width of 18.55 hectare (45.8 acre), roughly 10 kilometres from the city of Miri, Sarawak. The school is situated next to the Malaysian Teachers Education Institute, Sarawak Campus and is closed to the Miri Airport. Luak Esplanade, a public beach is located right in front of this school, showing the beauty of the South China Sea.
