= Sekolah Tun Fatimah =

Location
- Jalan Tun Abdul Razak, 80000 Johor Bahru; Johor Bahru, Johor; Malaysia

Information
- Type: Public, All-girls boarding school, Sekolah Berasrama Penuh
- Motto: Berusaha tangga kejayaan (Striving is the key to success)
- Established: 1956 in Malacca, 25 September 1965 in Johor
- School district: Johor Bahru
- Principal: Radziah Mohd Din
- Grades: Form 1 - Form 5
- Gender: Female
- Enrollment: 727 (2026)
- Language: Malay, English
- Classrooms: Setia (Loyal); Tegas (Strict); Feminin (Feminine); Jujur (Honest); Bersih (Clean)
- Houses: Zeti Aziz (blue); Zainon Munshi (yellow); Aishah Ghani (green); Fatimah Hashim (red).
- Colours: Green and Yellow
- Yearbook: Purnama
- Affiliations: Sekolah Berasrama Penuh, Ministry of Education (Malaysia)
- Alumni: Persatuan Bekas Pelajar Sekolah Tun Fatimah (Srikandi)
- Website: stf.edu.my

Sekolah Tun Fatimah (English: Tun Fatimah School; abbreviated STF) is a premier all-girl boarding school (Sekolah Berasrama Penuh) located in Johor Bahru, Johor, Malaysia. The students in the school are affectionally known as STFians. In 2010, the school was awarded with the Sekolah Berprestasi Tinggi or High Performance School. The school specialises in netball, hockey, band as well as basketball, robotics, dance and debate. STF has been known for producing high-resistant yet poised young ladies throughout Malaysia. The school is a member of the Strategic Educational Alliance of Southeast Asia and adopted a school for Multimedia University.

== History ==
Sekolah Tun Fatimah is administered by the Ministry of Education. Students are selected based on their excellent academic performances via the UPSR (Primary School Assessment Test) and PMR (Lower Secondary Assessment).

Sekolah Tun Fatimah was founded in Durian Daun, Malacca in 1956 going by the name Malay Girls Secondary School. The goal was to educate malay girls from rural areas. Those who aspire to become teachers were enrolled directly into the Malacca Malay Women Teachers Training College (MWTC) after their LCE/SRP examination.

The school was officially launched by YB Encik Khir bin Johari, the Minister of Education of Malaya in 1958 and given the name "Tun Fatimah School, named after a famous Malay Srikandi Woman of the Malacca sultanate. Sekolah Tun Fatimah has moved to its current premises in August 1962. On 25 September 1965, STF was officially opened by HRH Sultanah of Johor, Sultanah Ungku Tun Aminah Binti Ungku Ahmad.

== Notable alumni ==
The alumni association of STF is known as Persatuan Bekas Pelajar Sekolah Tun Fatimah (Srikandi)

- Tunku Azizah Aminah Maimunah Iskandariah - wife of Abdullah of Pahang, Sultan of Pahang, daughter of Iskandar of Johor, sister to Ibrahim Ismail of Johor, Sultan of Johor
- Rina Harun - Minister of Women, Family and Community Development (Malaysia), Chairlady of Woman's wing of Malaysian United Indigenous Party
- Mas Ermieyati Samsudin - Deputy Minister in the Prime Minister's Department, Former Chairlady of the Woman's Youth (Puteri) of United Malays National Organisation (UMNO), Deputy Chairlady of Woman's wing of Malaysian United Indigenous Party
- Tan Sri Datin Paduka Zaharah Ibrahim - 11th Chief Judge of Malaya, Chairperson of Prasarana Malaysia Berhad (2019 - 2020)
