= SMS Seri Puteri =

- SESERI

Location
- Jalan Kolam Ayer, 51200; Ampang, Kuala Lumpur; Malaysia

Information
- Type: Public all-girls fully residential school
- Motto: Proaktif, Inovatif, Efektif; Proactive, Innovative, Effective
- Established: 1 April 2003
- Principal: Jamilah Abd Rahman (2009-2011); Datin Seri Zavirah Shaari (2012-2015); Asiah Zainal Abidin (2016-2020); Hajah Noridah Bt Haji Ramlan (2020-2022); Norzila binti Ali Musa (2022-now)
- Grades: Form 1 - Form 5
- Classes: Adioda, Bakerara, Cattleya
- Houses: Oncidium; Epidendrium; Brasssidium; Dendrobium
- Yearbook: Mestika SESERI
- Website: www.seseri.edu.my

Sekolah Menengah Sains Seri Puteri (English: Seri Puteri Science Secondary School; abbreviated SESERI) is an all-girls fully residential school in Malaysia, located in the heart of Kuala Lumpur. Each class and house in SESERI is named after the family of orchids.

SESERI was officially opened on 3 June 2003, on the previous site of Sekolah Seri Puteri which moved to a new site in Cyberjaya. 2004 was the first year for the Form 5 students of SESERI to sit for Sijil Pelajaran Malaysia (SPM).

Inducted as the 46th Sekolah Berasrama Penuh in Malaysia, the school consists of only selected female students who got straight As in PT3 throughout the country. Starting from 2016, SESERI admits Form 1 students who got 5As in their UPSR examination. During 2017, SESERI takes in students who scored 6As - 4As due to the changes made in the UPSR format.

The school consists of an administrative block, a science laboratories block, academic blocks, main hall, a cafeteria and a court called Gelanggang Anggerik Sari. In the hostel, there are three residential blocks, a mosque, a dining hall and a sports field.

In the 2019 SPM examination, the school gained a GPS of 1.68.
