= SMS Raja Tun Azlan Shah =

Boarding school in Perak, Malaysia

Coordinates: 4.853°N 100.752°E

SM Sains Raja Tun Azlan Shah
- SERATAS
- Taiping, Perak; Malaysia

Information
- Type: Secondary School, Boarding School Sekolah Berasrama Penuh
- Motto: Berdisiplin, Berilmu, Berbakti; Discipline Knowledge Serve
- Founded: 1 January 1982
- School district: Taiping
- Colours: Blue, Yellow, Black
- Yearbook: SERATAS
- Affiliations: Sekolah Berasrama Penuh Ministry of Education (Malaysia)

Sekolah Menengah Sains Raja Tun Azlan Shah (English: Raja Tun Azlan Shah Science Secondary School; abbreviated SERATAS) is a boarding school located 3 km from the town of Taiping, Perak, Malaysia. It is situated at the foot of Bukit Larut (Maxwell Hill). The school covers an area of 51.9 acres (21.0 ha) and was founded on 1 January 1982 under the Rancangan Malaysia Ketiga (RMK-3). The school was formerly known as Sekolah Menengah Sains Perak and as Sekolah Menengah Sains Taiping or SEMESTA. The school enrollment was focused mainly on excellent students from rural areas and economically disadvantaged backgrounds.

As of November 2024, the principal of SERATAS is Wan Shaiful Akmar bin Mohamad Idris.

== Notable people ==
- Azri Zahier, Hausboom founder
- Amanina Alwani, composer
