= SMS Teluk Intan =

School in Hilir Perak, Perak, Malaysia

Sekolah Menengah Sains Teluk Intan
- SEMESTI

Location
- Teluk Intan; Perak, 36000; Malaysia; 3°56′8.47″N 100°57′34.50″E

Information
- Type: Public boarding school
- Motto: Ilmu Teras Hidup (Knowledge is the Core of Life)
- Established: 19 February 1984
- School district: Bagan Datuk
- School code: AEAB 003
- Principal: Hajah Samsiah @ Hamzah
- Grades: Form 1 - Form 5
- Enrollment: 711
- Average class size: 25
- Language: Malay, English, Arabic, German, Japanese, Mandarin
- Houses: Omega de Cobra (Red), Sigma de Stallion (Blue), Theta de Dragon (Yellow), Delta de Leopard (Green)
- Colours: Maroon, yellow
- Yearbook: Inspirasi
- Affiliations: Sekolah Berasrama Penuh

Official Website of ASTI (SEMESTI Alumni Association)

Sekolah Menengah Sains Teluk Intan (English: Teluk Intan Science Secondary School; abbreviated SEMESTI) is a fully residential school in Malaysia. This school is located 13 miles from Teluk Intan and has an area of 21.5 hectares. It was built in 1980, but students did not start enrolling until 1984.

== History ==
The early work on building this science school started in September 1980. On completion, the first batch of students was admitted in 1984. The 425 students were Form 1, Form 4 and Australian English Test (AET) students. The first principal was Tuan Haji Noor bin Bakar PJK, who took up his post on 1 February 1984. In 1985, GCE-A students started to enroll into this school.

SEMESTI had an impressive academic record. In the 1986 SPM, with the 100% pass rate (180 students with Grade I, 6 with Grade II and 5 with Grade III), SEMESTI had the best SPM result in Malaysia. In the 1987 SPM, it had another 100% pass rate (130 students with Grade I and 3 students with Grade II), the second best SPM result in Malaysia.
