= SBP Integrasi Selandar =

School in Jasin, Melaka, Malaysia

- SBPI Selandar

Location
- 77500; Selandar, Malacca; Malaysia
- Coordinates: 2.4645°N 102.411°E

Information
- Type: Public boarding school
- Motto: Cemerlang Berwawasan (Excellent Vision)
- Religious affiliation: Islam
- Established: 1 August 2003
- Principal: Ust.Badrol Shah bin Abdul Saha
- Classrooms: 20
- Yearbook: IMTIYAZ
- Website: sbpiselandarmel.blogspot.com

Sekolah Berasrama Penuh Integrasi Selandar (English: Selandar Integrated Fully Residential School, abbreviated SBPI Selandar) is a boarding school located in Selandar, Malacca. It is one out of three Fully Residential Schools (Malay: Sekolah Berasrama Penuh, SBP) in the state and one of 12 such schools in Malaysia. The school was established on 1 August 2003 when 84 first generation Form 1 students registered themselves at SISMe based on their excellence in the now defunct Ujian Penilaian Sekolah Rendah (UPSR) examination.
