= SMS Tuanku Munawir =

SM Sains Tuanku Munawir
- SASER
- Seremban, Negeri Sembilan; Malaysia

Information
- Type: Fully Residential School
- Motto: Berilmu Beriman Berbakti; Knowledgeable Believe Serve
- School code: SMSTM (formerly SMSSr)
- Principal: Tuan Zuri Afizu bin Mat Jusoh
- Grades: Form 1 to Form 5
- Gender: Male
- Age range: 13 - 17
- Enrollment: approx. 500
- Classes: Alfa, Beta, Delta, Epsilon
- Language: Malay, English
- Houses: Tuah; Lekir; Kasturi; Jebat
- Colours: Blue; Green
- Slogan: SASER Namamu Teratas
- Yearbook: SASER
- Affiliations: Sekolah Berasrama Penuh; High-performing Schools
- Alumni: Pertubuhan Alumni SASER (SASEROBA)
- Website: www.saser.edu.my

Sekolah Menengah Sains Tuanku Munawir (English: Tuanku Munawir Science School; abbreviated SASER; formerly known as Sekolah Menengah Sains Seremban), is an all-boys boarding school located in Seremban, Negeri Sembilan, Malaysia. Established in February 2002, it is one of the best schools under the Sekolah Berasrama Penuh (SBP) and was awarded as the best school in Malaysia for the 2006, 2007, 2008, 2009, 2010, 2014 and 2015 Sijil Pelajaran Malaysia (SPM) result achievement.

In 2009, SASER became the first MOE's school to achieve a GPS for the SPM of below 1.0 which was 0.97. In SPM 2010, it created the best record for GPS SPM of below 0.9 which was 0.89. SASER also created a record in producing the highest number of candidates obtaining straight A+ in SPM 2010 with 16 students. The highest number of straight A+ in the history of SPM is held by Sekolah Tun Fatimah in SPM 2013 with 21 students.

The school's performance in the 2012 SPM is the second best among SBP's with GPS 1.06, behind Sekolah Seri Puteri. In 2011 and 2013, SASER got 5th place among SBP's. The number one SBP for that year was Kolej Tunku Kurshiah and Sekolah Tun Fatimah respectively.

In 2011, the school was awarded with the Sekolah Berprestasi Tinggi or High Performance School title, a title awarded to schools that have met stringent criteria including academic achievement, international recognition, network and linkages. The school is specialises in Innovation Team, Seni Tari Randai and Caklempong.

For SPM 2015, SASER once again maintain its success by being the top school in the whole of Malaysia.

The school is widely known as SASER and students of this school bears the name Saserian or Putera Saser.

== History ==
SASER was officially established in February 2002. The school uses the site of Sekolah Datuk Abdul Razak (SDAR) which had moved to the new premises at Sungai Gadut, Seremban. Works on upgrading the abandoned school building have been carried out with the overall cost of almost RM 600,000. The upgrading works were completed on 30 March 2002.

On 1 March 2002, the first principal of SASER, Tuan Haji Md Azam bin Atan registered to the school. The first group of teachers registered on 18 March 2002 and the second group registered on 20 March 2002 - a total of 26 people.

=== The Pioneer Saserians ===
Only 122 students registered in 2002 through two intakes as the first group of students in SASER history. The second group was registered in the year 2003 stood at more than 300 people through four intakes until the end of 2004. Only 155 remained until SPM 2003.

=== SASER Renamed ===
Sekolah Menengah Sains Seremban, which has been the country's top residential school for Sijil Pelajaran Malaysia (SPM) results, has been renamed Sekolah Menengah Sains Tuanku Munawir. It is named after the ninth ruler of Negeri Sembilan, Tuanku Munawir Tuanku Abdul Rahman, who reigned from 5 April 1960 to 14 April 1967 and made educational gains in the state during his reign, and is the father of the present ruler Tuanku Muhriz. The declaration of the new name was made by HRH Tuanku Muhriz at the school's Dewan Putera. The name change also changed the school anthem, although the SASER acronym doesn't change.

== Sports ==
- Football (Saser FC)
- Rugby (Saser Dark Horse)
- Volleyball (Saser Phoenix)
- Sepak Takraw(Saser Thunder)
- Chess (Saser IQ)
- Softball (Saser Vipers)
- Badminton (Saser Badminton Club)
- Table Tennis (Saser Ping pong)
- Basketball (Saser Mavericks)
- Hockey (Saser Virtuoso Dragon)
- Cricket (Saser Wolf)
- Archery (Saser Marksman)
- Handball
- Track and field
- Bowling
- Tennis

== List of Principals ==
- Dato' Haji Azam bin Haji Mohd Atan (March 2002 - December 2003)
- Tuan Haji Baharuddin bin Dato'Burhan (January 2004 - December 2004)
- Tuan Haji Mohamad Kamaludin bin Taib (January 2005 - March 2008)
- Dato' Haji Sabuddin bin Haji Sani (March 2008 – 16 September 2019)
- Tuan Haji Mohd Abd Aziz bin Mahmud (January 2020 - 2021)
- Tuan Haji Sahak bin Ahmadun (2021 - 2022)
- Tuan Adam @ Karim bin Malek (2023 - 2026)
- Tuan Zuri Afizu bin Mat Jusoh (2026-Kini)
