= Sekolah Seri Puteri =

- SSP

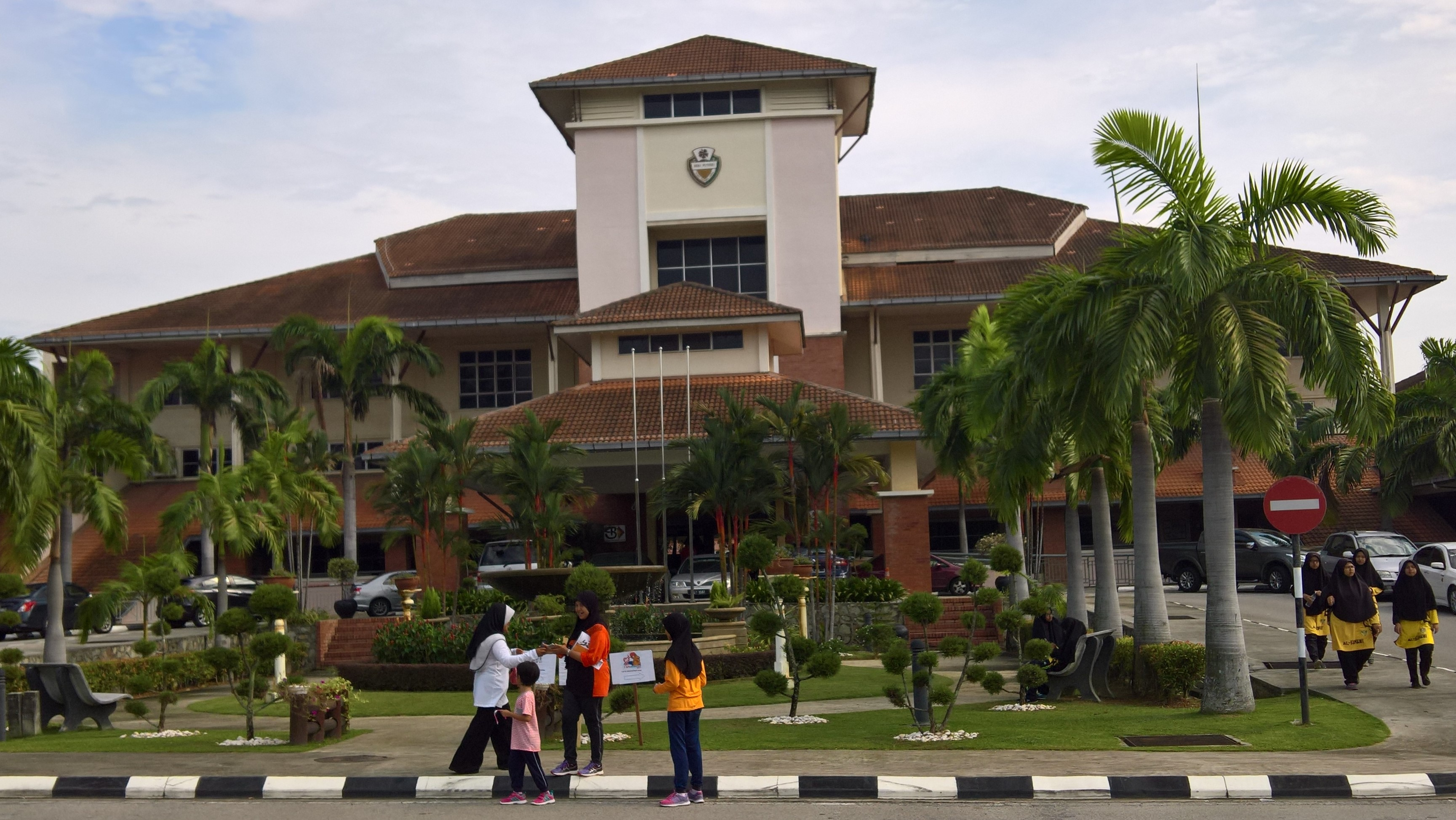
- The main building

Location
- Persiaran Tasik; Cyberjaya, Selangor, 63000; Malaysia
- 2°54′39.575″N 101°39′51.886″E

Information
- Type: Public all-girls boarding school Sekolah Berasrama Penuh
- Motto: Ilmu Usaha Jaya (Knowledge, Perseverance, Excellence)
- Established: 6 May 1968
- School district: Cyberjaya
- Principal: Pn Hjh Noridah Binti Hj Ramlan
- Grades: Form 1 – Form 5
- Enrollment: approx 850
- Language: Malay, English
- Classrooms: Pintar, Usaha, Tekun, Elit, Restu, Intelek
- Colours: Green and Red
- Yearbook: Teraju Puteri
- Affiliations: Sekolah Berasrama Penuh, Ministry of Education (Malaysia)
- Alumni: Persatuan Alumni Sekolah Seri Puteri (PUTERI)
- Website: www.seriputeri.edu.my

Sekolah Seri Puteri (English: Seri Puteri School; abbreviated SSP) is an all-girls boarding school (Sekolah Berasrama Penuh) located in Cyberjaya, Selangor, Malaysia. In 2010, Sekolah Seri Puteri was awarded the prestigious Sekolah Berprestasi Tinggi or High Performance School title. Other than its academic performance in the Sijil Pelajaran Malaysia examinations, the school is also known for its wind orchestra and performance in basketball as well as their debate team. In the Sijil Pelajaran Malaysia 2021, the national examination taken by all fifth-year secondary school students in Malaysia, SSP obtained a grade value average of 0.97 (on a scale of 0–9 with 0 being the best), making it the best record the school has held in seven years. The school was also an adopted school for Multimedia University.

== History ==
Sekolah Seri Puteri was founded on 6 May 1968, and the original name was Sekolah Menengah Kebangsaan Perempuan Jalan Kolam Ayer (Female Secondary School of Jalan Kolam Ayer), Kuala Lumpur. It was established to provide secondary education for students from across Malaysia. Built on a 19-acre site at Jalan Kolam Ayer previously owned by a technical school, the school opened with 144 Form 4 students, 10 teachers, and three non-academics who assisted Puan Khalidah Adibah Amin, the first principal.

In 1969, the school started contracting teachers from Bangladesh to fill vacancies in the science and mathematics departments. The first group of 102 Form 6 students was admitted in May 1971. Form 1 students were first admitted in 1975.

In 1975, pre-university matriculation courses from Universiti Kebangsaan Malaysia were first attended by 88 students.

The school celebrated its tenth anniversary on 16 September 1978.

On 1 May 2003, Sekolah Seri Puteri moved from Jalan Kolam Ayer to its current location in Cyberjaya. The grand opening of the new facility was held on 10 April 2007. Sultanah Nur Zahirah, the thirteenth Raja Permaisuri Agong of Malaysia, officiated at the opening.

In 2010, the school implement cash-less system and in 2016, it become the first boarding school that introduces its own online payment, known as SPET

== School site ==
Sekolah Seri Puteri occupies a 20-acre site in the Cyberjaya Flagship Zone on high ground overlooking an artificial lake, Putrajaya Lake. Development of Sekolah Seri Puteri began on 5 April 2001, with a total construction cost of RM 56 Million. Construction ended on 26 January 2003.

The school can accommodate up to 1,200 students along with 250 academic and support staff. The main building contains a large hall, recreation and sports facilities, classrooms, laboratories, and workshops blocks. The site also includes a student residence, a teachers residence, and a dining hall. A great hall holds 1,200 people, and a lecture hall seats 255 people.

== Awards and recognition ==
=== Academics ===
In 2013, the school hosted the Fully Residential School International Symposium (FRSIS) with the theme "Go Green, Initiatives for the Future". The keynote speaker was the prime minister of Malaysia, Dato' Najib Razak.

=== Seri Puteri Winds ===
In 2011, the school's wind orchestra, Seri Puteri Winds (SP Winds), was featured in the flashmob-style reality programme Refleksi Orkestra in conjunction with Radio Televisyen Malaysia's golden jubilee concert, Orkestra RTM 50.

In 2013, SP Winds won the gold medal at the 24th Australian International Music Festival (AIMF2013) in Sydney. This accomplishment earned the school three entries in the Malaysian Book of Records:

- "first Malaysian government residential school to qualify for the Australian International Music Festival (AIMF)"
- "first Malaysian government residential school to play at the Sydney Opera House, Australia"
- "first Malaysian government residential school to win a gold medal in AIMF"

=== Seri Puteri Debates ===
The school’s English language debating team Thalions has won several debating competitions, particularly the Pertandingan Bahas Bahasa Inggeris Piala Perdana Menteri in 2009 and 2018 as well as other debating tournaments such as the Cabaran Debat Zaaba. They have also competed globally in the World Scholar's Cup in the United States and China.

Their Malay debating team, Eccentric, emerged champion of the Pertandingan Bahas Bahasa Melayu Piala Perdana Menteri in 2012.

== Notable alumni ==
The alumni association of SSP is known as Persatuan Alumni Sekolah Seri Puteri (PUTERI).

- Harlina Halizah Siraj – Head, Department of Medical Education, Universiti Kebangsaan Malaysia Medical Centre (PPUKM)
- Sawiah Jusoh – chief executive officer (CEO) Success Precession Wellbeing Ltd, Cardiff, United Kingdom.
- Shazelina Zainul Abidin - High Commissioner of Malaysia to Canada
- Rusnah Aluai-Former Member of Parliament for Tangga Batu

== See also ==
- List of schools in Selangor
