= SMS Kuala Selangor =

Sekolah Menengah Sains Kuala Selangor Kuala Selangor Science School
- KUSESS
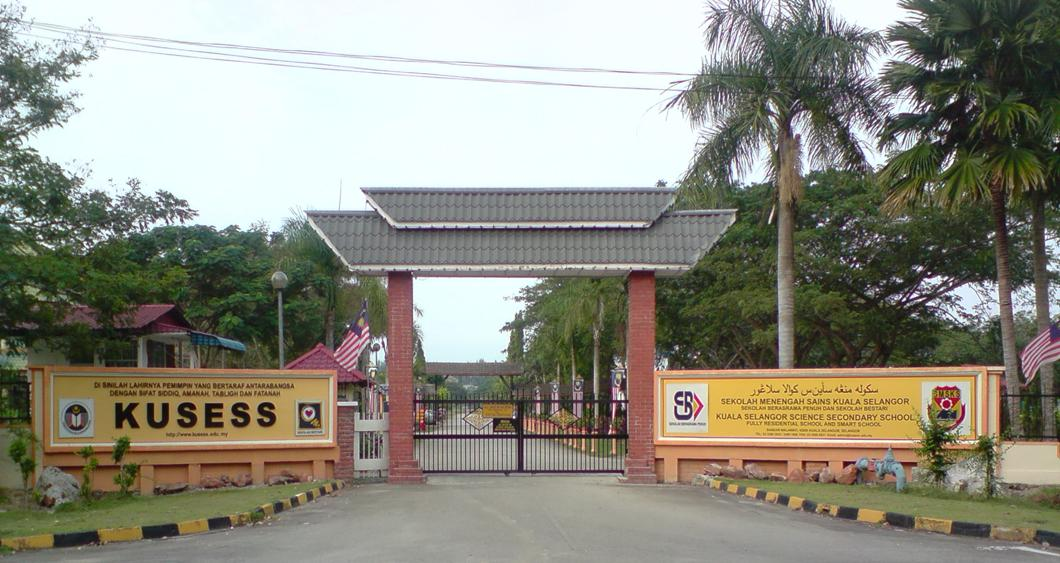
- Main entrance of KUSESS

Location
- Bandar Malawati, Kuala Selangor; Selangor, 45000; Malaysia; 3°19′21.00″N 101°16′27.96″E

Information
- Type: Fully Residential School
- Motto: Berilmu, Beramal, Berbakti
- Established: 8 September 1996
- School district: Kuala Selangor
- School code: BEA3083
- Principal: Puan Hajah Feizatul Akmar Nor Binti Nurbi
- Staff: 86
- Grades: Form 1 - Form 5
- Enrollment: 700
- Average class size: 30
- Language: Malay, English
- Classrooms: Berlian, Delima, Intan, Mutiara, and Nilam
- Houses: Satria; Wira; Perdana; Waja
- Yearbook: Paradigma
- Alumni: Kuala Selangor Science Alumni
- Website: kusess.edu.my

Sekolah Menengah Sains Kuala Selangor (English: Kuala Selangor Science Secondary School; abbreviated KUSESS) is a Fully Residential School, also known as Sekolah Berasrama Penuh (SBP) in Malaysia. KUSESS was then built under the Sixth Malaysia Plan. It is located near Bandar Melawati, Kuala Selangor which is about 70 kilometres from the nation's capital, Kuala Lumpur. The construction works on the school began on 24 April 1994 and finally completed in 1996.

The school started operating on 8 September 1996; with a first intake of 210 students,19 teaching staff and 4 support staff. The following year saw a sharp increase in the number of students that were admitted to the school. 187 students gained entry to Form 1 while 165 students were admitted into Form 4. The teaching staff almost tripled from 19 to 53. On 27 May 1997 the school was officiated then by the Deputy Prime Minister; Dato' Seri Anwar Ibrahim.

By 1998, the number of students had grown to 810 and the teaching staff had a strength of 63 people. The year also saw the retirement of the school's first principal Tuan Haji Khamis bin Maarof. He was replaced by Tuan Haji Ariffin bin Abdul Rahaman, who left his post at Sekolah Menengah Kadok, Kota Bahru, Kelantan to take the seat as the principal. It was also the year which saw the students of the school sit for Penilaian Menengah Rendah (PMR) and Sijil Pelajaran Malaysia (SPM) examinations for the first time. The results were an overwhelming success as for PMR as the school was ranked as one of the top 5 Sekolah Berasrama Penuh (SBP); while with the total of 147 students out of 148 students obtained first rank in Sijil Pelajaran Malaysia (SPM).

Today the school has 783 students in 25 classes, taught by 75 teachers.

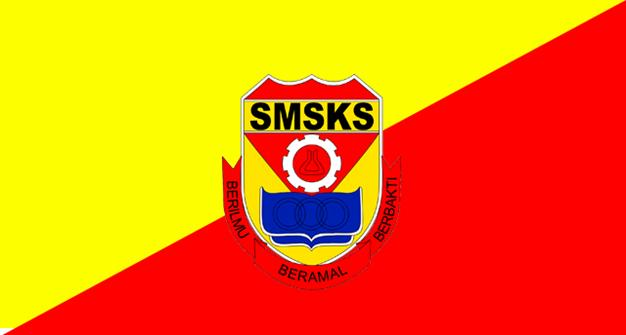
Flag of KUSESS

== Principals ==
Beginning	Ended	Name
1996	1998	Allahyarham Tuan Haji Khamis B. Maarof
1998	2002	Tuan Haji Ariffin B. Abdul Rahman
2002	2006	Puan Rosida Bt. Mohd. Zain
2006	2008	Puan Che Kamaliah bt. Endud
2008	2011	Puan Hajjah Rossminah Bt Yamin
2011	2014	Dr. Hajah Rosnah Bt Selamat
2014	2020	Tuan Mohd Shahadan B. Abd Rahman
2020	2021	Puan Monarazmah Binti Abdul Razak
2021	2023	Tuan Haji Hassan Abrar bin Haji Halidi
2023	Present	Puan Hajah Feizatul Akmar Nor Binti Nurbi

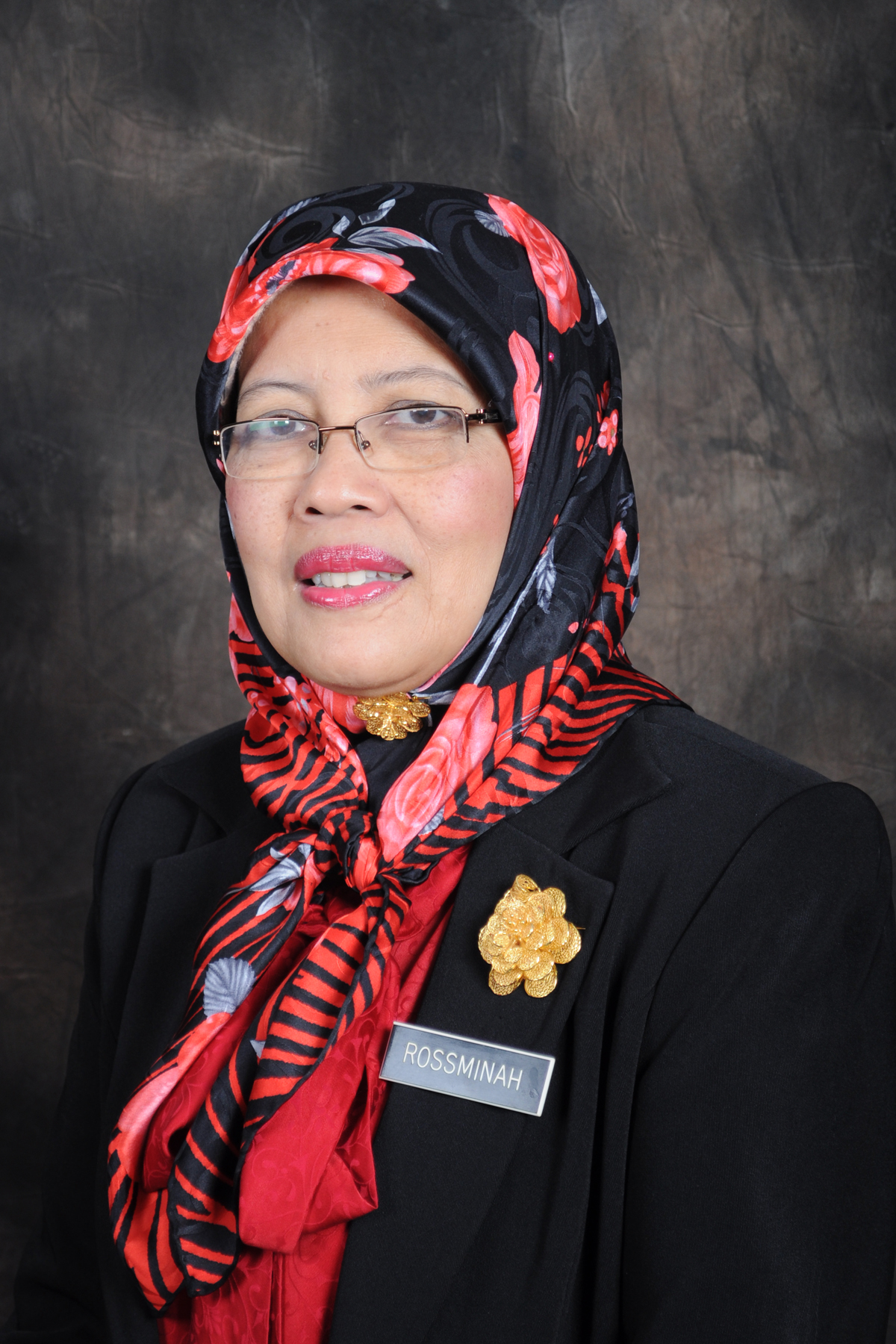
Puan Hajah Rossminah Bt. Yamin

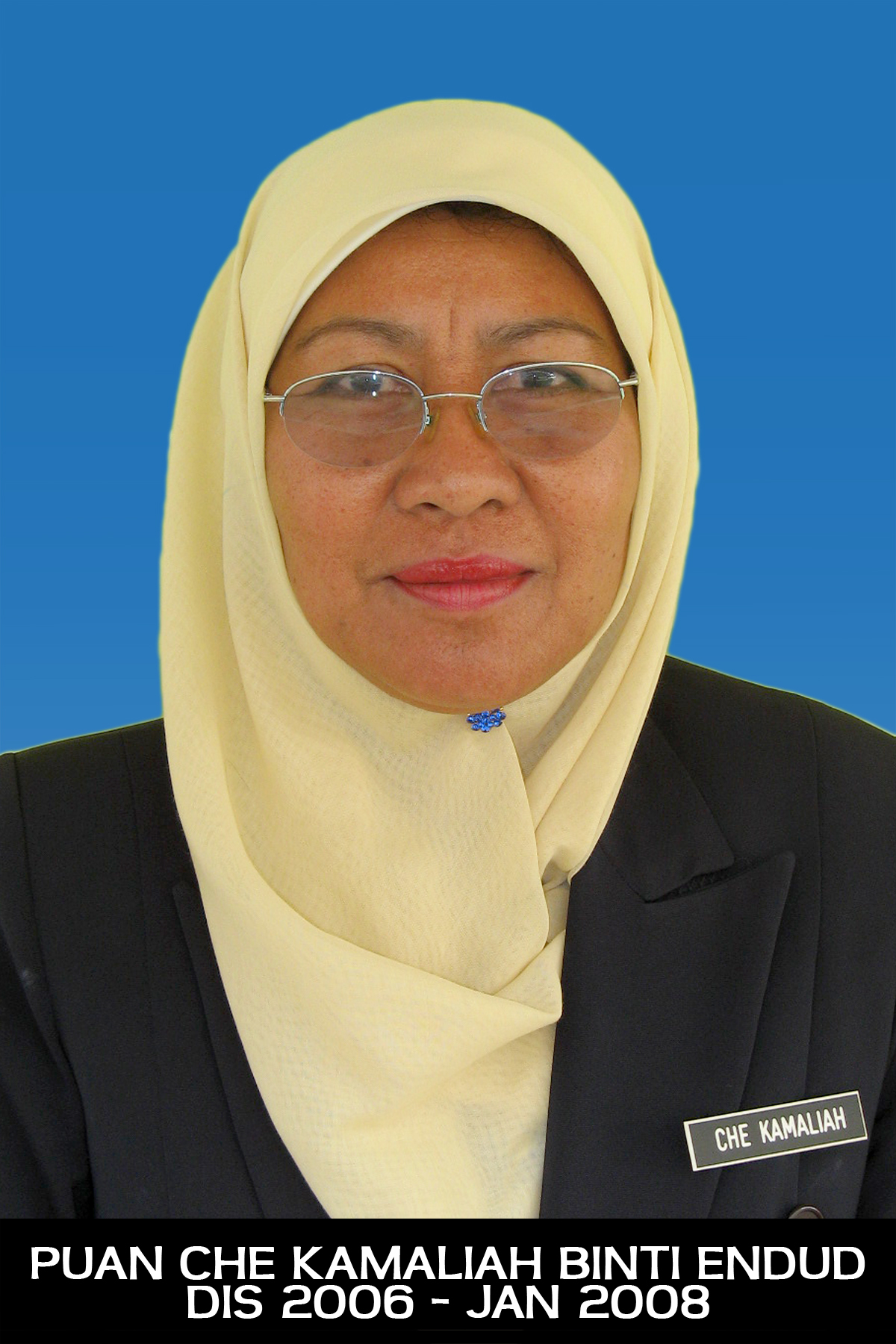
Puan Che Kamaliah Bt. Endud

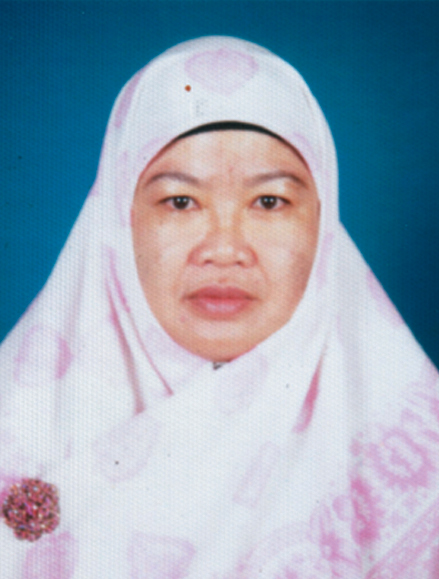
Puan Rosida Bt. Mohd. Zain

== Notable alumni ==
- Ahmad Fedtri bin Yahya, a famous Malaysian speaker, television personality and radio presenter
