= SBP Integrasi Tun Abdul Razak =

Coordinates: 3°34′N 103°23′E

- InSTAR

Location
- Pulau Serai, Pekan, Pahang; Malaysia

Information
- Type: Public boarding school
- Motto: Beyond Success
- Religious affiliation: Islam
- Established: 4 August 2003
- School district: Pekan
- Principal: Mat Hatta bin Hassan
- Grades: Form 1 - Form 5
- Enrollment: 560
- Language: Malay, English
- Classrooms: 20
- Colours: Red, yellow, blue, white, black
- Website: https://instarpekan.blogspot.com/

Sekolah Berasrama Penuh Integrasi Tun Abdul Razak (English: Tun Abdul Razak Integrated Residential School, abbreviated InSTAR) is one of the 73 boarding schools (SBP) in Malaysia. The school is located in Pulau Serai, Pekan, Pahang. In 2009, the school had 197 boys and 228 girls, making a total enrolment of 425 people. It had a total of 58 teachers.

The school site is 38 acres and located in the state assembly Peramu Jaya, Pekan Parliament, about 15 km from the city town and 35 km from Kuantan.

As of 2026, InSTAR follows through with Natural science SPM and Religious science SPM.

== History ==
InSTAR was opened on 4 August 2003 under the name of Sekolah Berasrama Penuh Integrasi Pekan (SBPIP) only occupied by students from Form One, taken from schools around Pahang who are eligible to enter SBPIP. The first form four students intake was started in 2004.

On 23 May 2010, the name of Sekolah Berasrama Penuh Integrasi Pekan has been officially changed to Sekolah Berasrama Penuh Integrasi Tun Abdul Razak with the abbreviation of InSTAR (Integrated Residential School of Tun Abdul Razak). Since then instar continues to grow and now has reached maximum enrolment capacity of 560 students, 62 teachers and 20 supporting staff.

== List of Principals ==
Since operating on 4 August 2003, InSTAR has been led by ten principals as follows:

Num.	Name	Serving Period
1	Abas Bin Abdul Rahman	2003 – 2006
2	Mokhtar Bin Abdullah	2006 – 2008
3	Azhari Bin Tauhid	2008 – 2011
4	Lailatun Zalaliah Binti Hussain	October 2011 – 2014
5	Dato' Haji Zaimi Bin Abu Bakar	Aug 2014 – Feb 2016
6	Ahmad Zamri Bin Md Isa	May 2016 – Dec 2017
7	Muhamad Yazid Bin Abdul Wahab	Jan 2018 – Jan 2021
8	Azaha Bin Awang	Feb 2021 – 2023
9	Mohd Asri Bin Yusof	May 2023 – December 2024
10	Mat Hatta bin Hassan	January 2025 – Present

== List of Batches ==
Age	Name	SPM	Status
Form 1	As-Siddiq	2030	Active
Form 2	Al-Abrar	2029	Active
Form 3	Al-Falah	2028	Active
Form 4	Invictus	2027	Active
Form 5	Valorous	2026	Active
21/25	Zealous	2025	Alumni
20/24	Quixotic	2024	Alumni
19/23	Fortissimus	2023	Alumni
18/22	Virtuous	2022	Alumni
17/21	Cynosure	2021	Alumni
16/20	Wynstelle	2020	Alumni
15/19	Vicombredz	2019	Alumni
14/18	SWAT Kingdom	2018	Alumni
13/17	Vyfonze	2017	Alumni
12/16	Quinter (Unconfirmed)	2016	Alumni
11/15	Vonquer (Unconfirmed)	2015	Alumni

== Achievement ==
- 16 February 2011: Deputy Prime Minister and also an Education Minister, Muhyiddin Yassin today announced InSTAR as a High Performance Schools (HPS).
- 2026: Muhammad Wafi Adli bin Mustafa Kamal, would be awarded 1st in Pahang and among the top 3 in Malaysia in Diplôme D'études En Langue Française (DELF) with a score of 99% on his results.{{citation needed}}
