= Ministry of Education (Malaysia) =

Government ministry of Malaysia

- Kementerian Pendidikan Malaysia (KPM); MoE
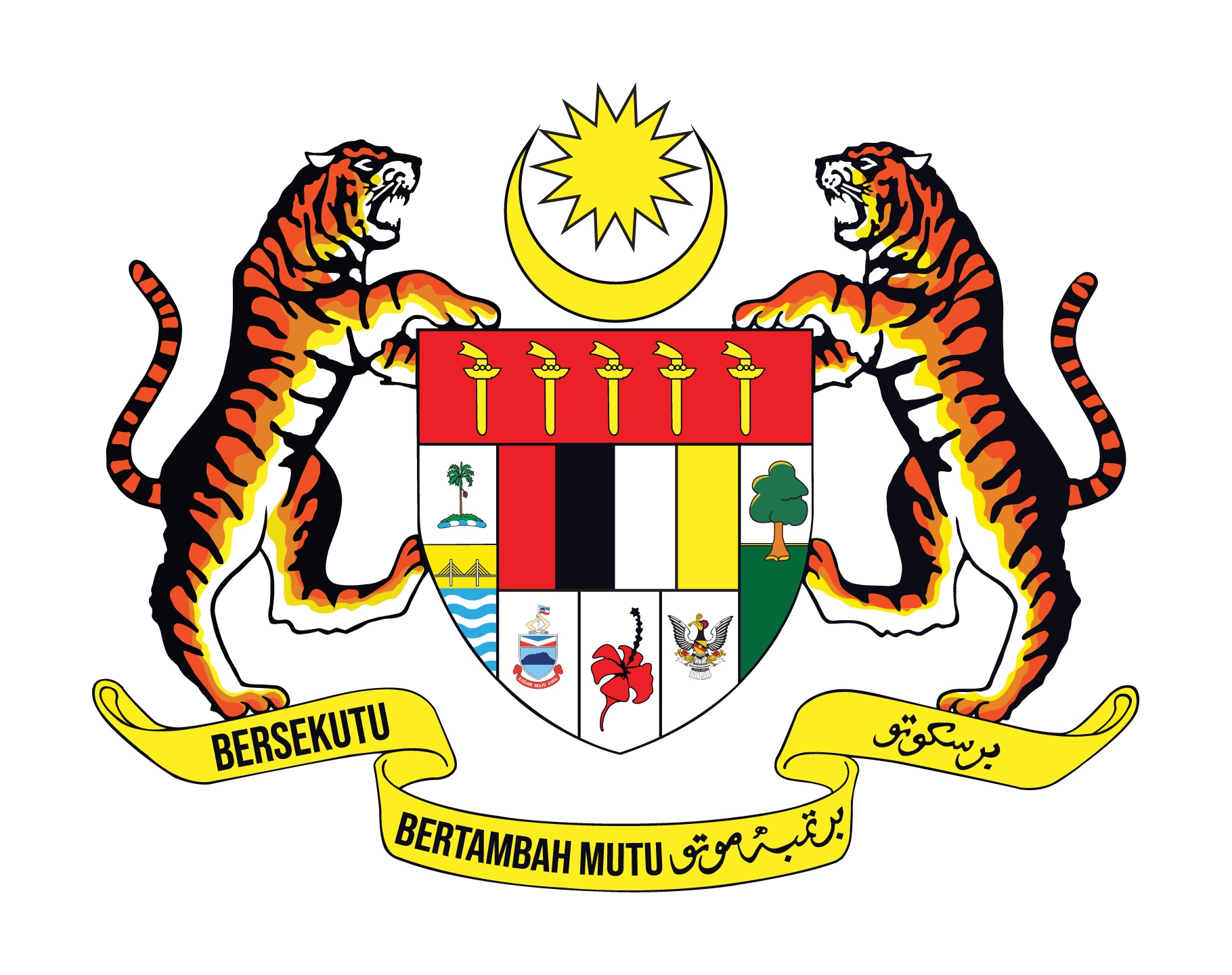
- Coat of arms of Malaysia

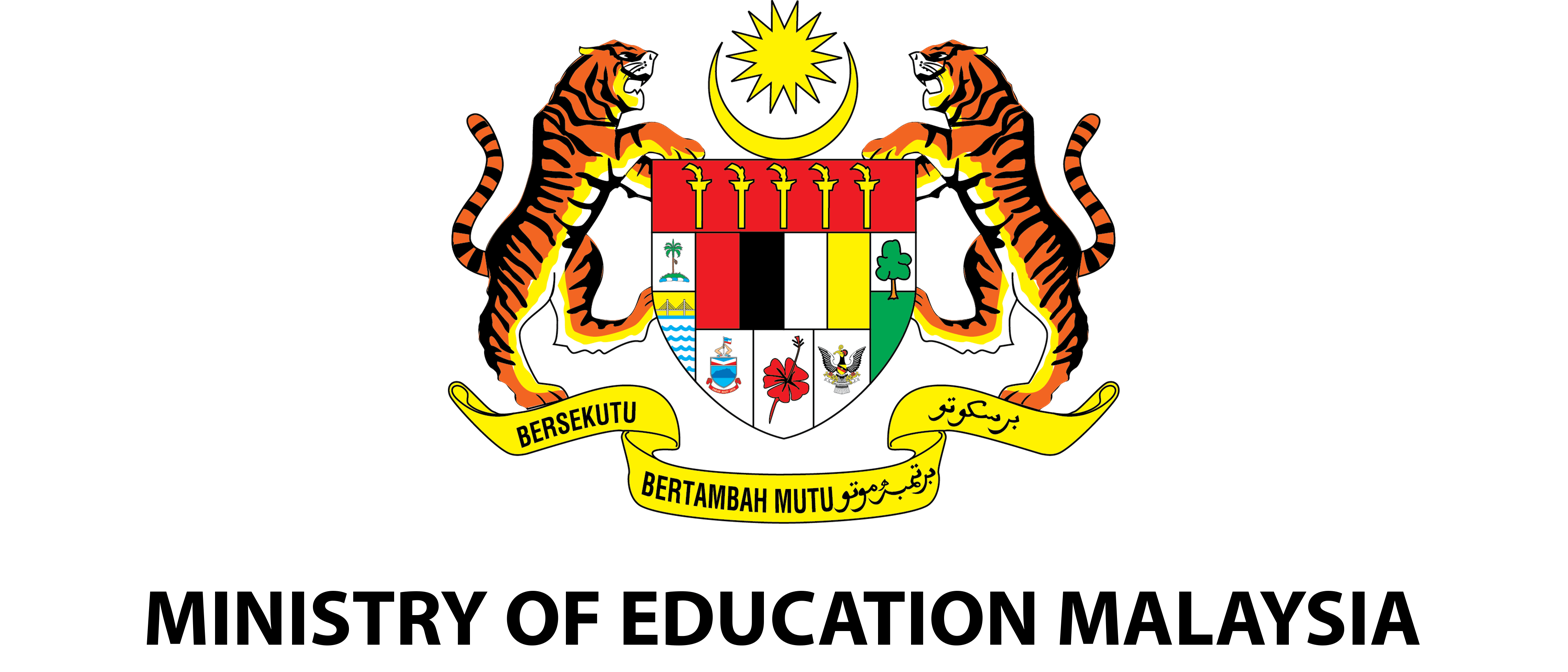

Ministry overview
- Formed: 1955 (71 years ago)
- Preceding agencies: Ministry of Education; Ministry of Higher Education
- Jurisdiction: Government of Malaysia
- Headquarters: Block E8, Parcel E, Federal Government Administrative Centre, 62604 Putrajaya
- Motto: Rapid Execution - Excellence: Ultimate Reach of an Organization (SIRE-EURO)
- Employees: 587,940 (2022)
- Annual budget: MYR 66,198,630,600 (2026)
- Minister responsible: Fadhlina binti Sidek, Minister of Education
- Deputy Minister responsible: Wong Kah Woh, Deputy Minister of Education
- Ministry executives: Dato' Wan Hashim bin Wan Rahim, Secretary-General; Datuk Dr. Mohd Azam bin Ahmad, Director-General; Dato' Dr. Megat Sany bin Megat Ahmad Supian, Deputy Secretary-General (Planning & Development); Datuk Wan Hashim bin Wan Raahim, Deputy Secretary-General (Management); Dr. Rusmini binti Ku Ahmad, Deputy Director-General of Education (Policy and Curriculum Sector); Zainal bin Abas, Deputy Director-General of Education (Education Operation Sector); Vacant, Deputy Director-General of Education (Professional Development Sector)
- Website: www.moe.gov.my

Footnotes
- Ministry of Education on Facebook

The Ministry of Education (Malay: Kementerian Pendidikan; Jawi: كمنترين ڤنديديقن) is a ministry of the Government of Malaysia that is responsible for education system, compulsory education, pre-tertiary education, technical and vocational education and training (TVET), curriculum standard, textbook, standardised test, language policy, translation, selective school, comprehensive school.

== Organisation ==
- Minister of Education
  - Deputy Minister of Education
  - Second Deputy Minister of Education
    - Secretary-General
      - Under the Authority of Secretary-General
        - Internal Audit Division
        - Corporate Communication Unit
        - Key Performance Indicator Unit
        - Education Performance and Delivery Unit
        - Integrity Unit
        - Legal Advisor Office
      - Deputy Secretary-General (Education Development)
        - Education Development Division
        - Procurement and Asset Management Division
        - Policy and International Relations Division
        - Scholarship Division
        - School Audit Division
      - Deputy Secretary-General (Management)
        - Finance Division
        - Human Resource Management Division
        - Account Division
        - Competency Development and Assessment Division
        - Psychology and Counselling Division
        - Information Management Division
        - Management Services Division
      - Director-General of Education
        - Deputy Director-General of Education (Education Development Policy)
          - Educational Planning and Research Division
          - Curriculum Development Division
          - Examination Syndicate
          - Educational Technology Division
          - Textbook Division
          - The National Book Council of Malaysia
        - Deputy Director-General of Education (Education Operation)
          - School Management Division
          - Technical and Vocational Education Division
          - Islamic Education Division
          - Special Education Division
          - Fully Residential and Excellence Schools Management Division
          - Sports Division
          - Private Education Division
          - Co-Curricular and Arts Division
        - Deputy Director-General of Education (Teaching Professionalism Development)
          - Teacher Training Division
          - Aminuddin Baki Institute
          - Inspectorate of Schools
          - Institute of Teacher Education
        - Under the Authority of Director-General of Education
          - Matriculation Division
          - Johor State Education Department
          - Kedah State Education Department
          - Kelantan State Education Department
          - Kuala Lumpur Federal Territory Education Department
          - Labuan Federal Territory Education Department
          - Malacca State Education Department
          - Negeri Sembilan State Education Department
          - Pahang State Education Department
          - Penang State Education Department
          - Perak State Education Department
          - Perlis State Education Department
          - Putrajaya Federal Territory Education Department
          - Sabah State Education Department
          - Sarawak State Education Department
          - Selangor State Education Department
          - Terengganu State Education Department

=== Federal agencies ===
1. Institute of Language and Literature, or Dewan Bahasa dan Pustaka (DBP). (Official site)
2. Malaysian Examination Council, or Majlis Peperiksaan Malaysia (MPM). (Official site)

== Key legislation ==
The Ministry of Education is responsible for administration of several key Acts:

- Educational Institutions (Discipline) Act 1976 [Act 174]
- Dewan Bahasa dan Pustaka Act 1959 [Act 213]
- Malaysian Examinations Council Act 1980 [Act 225]
- Education Act 1996 [Act 550]

== Policy Priorities of the Government of the Day ==
Frequently Asked Questions about MOE Policy

- Malaysia Education for All, or Pendidikan untuk Semua Malaysia
- Malaysia Education Blueprint 2013-2025
- To Uphold Bahasa Malaysia and To Strengthen English Language, or Dasar Memartabatkan Bahasa Malaysia dan Mengukuhkan Bahasa Inggeris (MBMMBI)
- 1 Student 1 Sport, or 1 Murid 1 Sukan
- National Education Policy, or Dasar Pendidikan Kebangsaan
- National Education Philosophy, or Falsafah Pendidikan Kebangsaan
- Education System Chart, or Carta Sistem Pendidikan
- Education National Key Result Area, or Bidang Keberhasilan Utama Negara Pendidikan (NKRA)
- Tenth Malaysia Plan (Education), or Rancangan Malaysia Kesepuluh (Pendidikan) (RMK-10)
- Transformational of Vocational Education, or Transformasi Pendidikan Vokasional (TPV)
- School Based Assessment, or Penilaian Berasaskan Sekolah (PBS)
- Primary School Standard Curriculum, or Kurikulum Standard Sekolah Rendah (KSSR)

== Malay name and its function ==
In Bahasa Melayu, it was called Kementerian Pendidikan, and was in charge of all education-related affairs. In 2004, its name was changed to Kementerian Pelajaran and became responsible for education from pre-school up to the secondary level. Responsibility for tertiary education was transferred to the newly established Ministry of Higher Education. In May 2013, Prime Minister Najib Razak announced that the two ministries would be merged to form a single Ministry of Education. In 2015, the ministry was split again, restoring the Ministry of Higher Education as a separate ministry.. The Ministry of Education also manages various digital education platforms and administrative systems, including the Aplikasi Pangkalan Data Murid (APDM), which is used by schools in Malaysia for student data management and related educational administration.

Following the formation of the Anwar Ibrahim administration in December 2023, the Ministry of Higher Education was retained as a separate ministry, while the Ministry of Education continued to oversee pre-school, primary and secondary education, reflecting the government's continued separation of school and higher education administration.

== Ministers ==
Minister	Portrait	Office	Executive Experience
Fadhlina Sidek		Minister of Education	Senator (September 2021 – November 2022); MP for Nibong Tebal (November 2022 – current)
Wong Kah Woh		Deputy Minister of Education	MLA for Canning (March 2008 – May 2018); MP for Ipoh Timor (May 2018 – November 2022); Chairman of the Sustainable Energy Development Authority (July 2019 – April 2020); Chairman of the Public Accounts Committee (August 2020 – October 2022); MP for Taiping (November 2022 – current)

== See also ==
- Minister of Education (Malaysia)
- Director General of Education (Malaysia)
- Education in Malaysia
- Early Intervention Centres in Malaysia
