= MCKK Premier 7's 2020 =

Malaysian youth rugby seven tournament

- Countries: Malaysia (24 teams)
- Tournament format(s): Group stage
- Champions: English College Johore Bahru (first title)
- Official website: Official website

The MCKK Premier 7's 2020 is the tenth edition of the annual, invitational Malay College Rugby Premier Sevens, which involved teams from Malaysia premier schools, states champions and international schools. It was scheduled from 28 February through 1 March 2020. Three international teams were initially scheduled to participate but cancelled due to the COVID-19 pandemic. English College Johore Bahru won the tournament for the first time since the competition inception.

== Teams ==
Teams competing in this tournament are the host, Malay College Kuala Kangsar, Sekolah Sukan Tunku Mahkota Ismail, SMK Seri Mersing, Sekolah Berasrama Penuh Integrasi Gombak, Sekolah Menengah Sains Hulu Selangor, SMK Tun Hussein Onn Kluang, SMK Abi Perlis, Royal Military College, King Edward VII School, Sekolah Berasrama Penuh Integrasi Kuantan, Sekolah Sultan Alam Shah, King George V School, Seremban, Sekolah Menengah Kebangsaan Sultan Sulaiman, Sekolah Menengah Sains Tuanku Jaafar, Sekolah Menengah Sains Sultan Mahmud, Sekolah Menengah Sains Pokok Sena, Sekolah Menengah Sultan Abdul Halim, Sekolah Tuanku Abdul Rahman, Sekolah Menengah Kebangsaan Taman Kosas, Victoria Institution, Sekolah Menengah Sains Selangor, Sekolah Dato' Abdul Razak, Kolej Yayasan Saad, Sekolah Menengah Kebangsaan Sultan Yahya Petra 1, Sekolah Menengah Kebangsaan Agama Shaikh Hj Othman Abdul Wahab, Vajiravudh College (Thailand), Hong Kong Sports School, and Scots College. (New Zealand).

== Group stage ==
Key to colours in group tables
Teams that progressed to the Cup/Plate quarter-finals
Teams that progressed to the Bowl quarter-finals
Teams that progressed to the Shield quarter-finals

=== Group A ===
Team	Pld	W	D	L	GF	GA	GD	Pts
(New Zealand) Scots College	3	3	0	0	143	0	+143	9
(Malaysia) Sekolah Berasrama Penuh Integrasi Gombak	3	2	0	1	43	36	+7	6
(Malaysia) Sekolah Menengah Kebangsaan Sultan Yahya Petra 1	3	2	0	1	64	40	+24	6
(Malaysia) Sekolah Menengah Sains Sultan Mahmud	3	1	1	1	51	34	+17	4

=== Group B ===
Team	Pld	W	D	L	GF	GA	GD	Pts
(Malaysia) Sekolah Tuanku Abdul Rahman	3	3	0	0	120	31	+89	9
(Malaysia) Sekolah Menengah Sains Selangor	3	1	1	1	32	46	−14	4
(Malaysia) Sekolah Menengah Sultan Abdul Halim	3	0	0	3	10	67	−57	0
(Malaysia) Royal Military College	3	0	0	3	0	109	−109	0

=== Group C ===
Team	Pld	W	D	L	GF	GA	GD	Pts
(Malaysia) Malay College Kuala Kangsar	3	3	0	0	103	12	+91	9
(Malaysia) Sekolah Menengah Kebangsaan King George V	3	2	0	1	69	45	+24	6
(Malaysia) Sekolah Berasrama Penuh Integrasi Kuantan	3	2	0	1	43	36	+7	6
(Malaysia) Sekolah Menengah Kebangsaan Agama Shaikh Hj Othman Abdul Wahab	3	0	1	2	10	60	−50	1

=== Group D ===
Team	Pld	W	D	L	GF	GA	GD	Pts
Hong Kong Sport School	3	3	0	0	91	7	+84	9
(Malaysia) Victoria Institution	3	1	1	1	43	73	−30	4
(Malaysia) Sekolah Menengah Sains Hulu Selangor	3	1	1	1	56	39	+17	4
(Malaysia) Kolej Vokasional Arau	3	0	0	3	10	67	−57	0

=== Group E ===
Team	Pld	W	D	L	GF	GA	GD	Pts
(Malaysia) Sekolah Sukan Tengku Mahkota Ismail	4	3	0	1	75	15	+60	9
(Malaysia) Sekolah Menengah Sains Pokok Sena	3	1	0	2	15	94	−79	3
(Malaysia) Sekolah Dato' Abdul Razak	3	0	0	3	24	55	−31	0
(Malaysia) King Edward VII School	3	1	0	2	47	46	+1	3

=== Group F ===
Team	Pld	W	D	L	GF	GA	GD	Pts
(Malaysia) Sekolah Sultan Alam Shah	3	3	0	0	57	36	+21	9
(Malaysia) Kolej Yayasan Saad	3	1	0	2	34	67	−33	3
(Thailand) Vajiravudh College	3	3	0	0	86	17	+69	9
(Malaysia) Sekolah Menengah Kebangsaan Taman Kosas	3	1	0	2	48	48	0	3

== Finals ==
=== Shield ===
Quarter-finals
(Malaysia) Sekolah Menengah Kebangsaan Sultan Yahya Petra 1	21
(Malaysia) Sekolah Berasrama Penuh Integrasi Kuantan	10
(Malaysia) Royal Military College	21
Sekolah Menengah Kebangsaan Agama Shaikh Hj Othman Abdul Wahab	7
(Malaysia) King Edward VII School	22
(Malaysia) Sekolah Menengah Sains Sultan Mahmud	17
(Malaysia) Sekolah Menengah Kebangsaan Taman Kosas	14
(Malaysia) Kolej Vokasional Arau	12

Semi-finals
(Malaysia) Sekolah Menengah Kebangsaan Sultan Yahya Petra 1	19
(Malaysia) Royal Military College	12
(Malaysia) King Edward VII School	5
(Malaysia) Sekolah Menengah Kebangsaan Taman Kosas	36

Final
(Malaysia) Sekolah Menengah Kebangsaan Sultan Yahya Petra 1	26
(Malaysia) Sekolah Menengah Kebangsaan Taman Kosas	35

=== Bowl ===
Quarter-finals
(Thailand) Vajiravudh College	26
(Malaysia) Victoria Institution	5
(Malaysia) Sekolah Menengah Sains Hulu Selangor	21
(Malaysia) Sekolah Dato' Abdul Razak	12
(Malaysia) Sekolah Menengah Sains Selangor	22
(Malaysia) Sekolah Menengah Sultan Abdul Halim	17
(Malaysia) Sekolah Menengah Kebangsaan King George V	19
(Malaysia) Kolej Yayasan Saad	12

Semi-finals
(Thailand) Vajiravudh College	12
(Malaysia) Sekolah Menengah Sains Hulu Selangor	29
(Malaysia) Sekolah Menengah Sains Selangor	15
(Malaysia) Sekolah Menengah Kebangsaan King George V	14

Final
(Malaysia) Sekolah Menengah Sains Hulu Selangor	29
(Malaysia) Sekolah Menengah Sains Selangor	14

=== Cup/Plate Quarter Finals ===
The winner of the quarter finals gain entrance to Cup semi-finals. The defeated at this quarter final gain entrance to Plate semi-finals. The Cup/Plate Quarter finals were played with sudden death. In the quarterfinals, MCKK All Blacks, ranked third behind Scots College and Hong Kong Sports School at the end of the preliminary round, trailed 7-10 before overcoming a potentially difficult opponent in Sekolah Alam Shah Putrajaya 19–10. Local powerhouse Tunku Mahkota Ismail Sports School's love affair in this fifth edition of the MCKK Premier Sevens also ended prematurely in the quarterfinals stage. The 2011 and 2012 champions went down 17–14 against a well-oiled attacking machinery of STAR. This is the second time SSTMI failed to advance beyond the second round after back to back victories in earlier editions. In 2014 SSTMI were humbled 43-0 by Scots College in the semi-finals.

(New Zealand) Scots College	24-7	(Malaysia) Sekolah Menengah Sains Pokok Sena
(Malaysia) Sekolah Sukan Tunku Mahkota Ismail	14-17	(Malaysia) Sekolah Tuanku Abdul Rahman
Hong Kong Sports School	31-19	(Malaysia) Sekolah Berasrama Penuh Integrasi Gombak
(Malaysia) Malay College Kuala Kangsar	19-10	(Malaysia) Sekolah Sultan Alam Shah

=== Plate ===
Semi-finals
(Malaysia) Sekolah Menengah Sains Pokok Sena	15
(Malaysia) Sekolah Sukan Tunku Mahkota Ismail	21
(Malaysia) Sekolah Berasrama Penuh Integrasi Gombak	31
(Malaysia) Sekolah Sultan Alam Shah	12

Final
(Malaysia) Sekolah Sukan Tunku Mahkota Ismail	24
(Malaysia) Sekolah Berasrama Penuh Integrasi Gombak	38

=== Cup ===
Scots College slammed the brakes on Sekolah Tuanku Abdul Rahman advancement with a 26–12 win in the semi-finals. It was the second time STAR failed to get past Scots College following the 36–14 defeat in last year's Cup final. Hong Kong Sports School, the eventual winner broke the hearts of hundreds of former MCKK All Blacks rugby enthusiasts and folks in the semi-finals with a clinical performance as they romped home to a 22–0 victory over the 2013 champions.

Semi-finals
(New Zealand) Scots College	26
(Malaysia) Sekolah Tuanku Abdul Rahman	12
Hong Kong Sports School	22
(Malaysia) Malay College Kuala Kangsar	0

Final
(New Zealand) Scots College	12
Hong Kong Sports School	31

== Sponsors ==
- Premier Sponsors - Telekom Malaysia
- Sponsors - Bloomberg TV Malaysia, Ranhill Bhd, Cyberview, Proton, Modenas, KPJ Healthcare Bhd, Carisbook, Supreme Landmobile & Wireless Corporation and SA Kargo Sdn. Bhd.

== See also ==
- Malay College Rugby Premier Sevens
- Malay College Kuala Kangsar
