= MCKK Premier 7's 2014 =

Malaysian youth rugby seven tournament

- Countries: Malaysia (19 teams); Thailand (1 team); Hong Kong (1 team); Singapore (1 team); South Africa (1 team); New Zealand (1 team)
- Tournament format(s): Group stage
- Champions: Scots College (First title)
- Matches played: 48
- Official website: Official website

The MCKK Premier 7's 2014 was the fourth edition of the annual, invitational Malay College Rugby Premier Sevens, which involved teams from Malaysia premier schools, states champions and international schools. It was scheduled from 28 February till 2 March 2014. For the fourth edition of the Tournament, the number of international teams invited has increased from three teams in the previous Tournament to five teams. This year, teams from New Zealand and South Africa, two Test Playing Rugby Nations, will feature for the first time in the Tournament together with debutant Singapore. Thailand and Hong Kong will also be returning this year. The tournament is also on the verge of being recognized by International Rugby Board with help by Malaysian Rugby Union. The tagline for this tournament is "Premiering Talent and Sportsmanship". Initially, Brunei Sports School were confirmed of participating the events before pulling out in the final minute.

For the first time of the tournament history, the NJ Ryan Cup were won by an international representative. Scots College of New Zealand bagged the cup by defeating Sekolah Tuanku Abdul Rahman in the Cup final with score 36-14. Scots College done an impressive rampage in the tournament by winning matches with huge margin throughout the competition with at least 5 try for each game and only two opponents managed to cross its try line (Sekolah Menengah Kebangsaan Sultan Yahya Petra 1 and Sekolah Tuanku Abdul Rahman). The defending champion and host, Malay College Kuala Kangsar, were denied for defending the trophy by Cup finalist, Sekolah Tuanku Abdul Rahman in Cup semi-final.

== Teams ==
Teams competing in this tournament were the host and defending champion, Malay College Kuala Kangsar, SM Vocational Arau, Sekolah Menengah Sultan Abdul Halim, Sekolah Menengah Sains Pokok Sena, Sekolah Tuanku Abdul Rahman, Sekolah Menengah Sains Hulu Selangor, Sekolah Menengah Kebangsaan Taman Kosas, Victoria Institution, Sekolah Menengah Sains Selangor, Sekolah Sultan Alam Shah, Sekolah Dato' Abdul Razak, Kolej Yayasan Saad, Sekolah Sukan Tunku Mahkota Ismail, Sekolah Berasrama Penuh Integrasi Kuantan, Sekolah Menengah Sains Sultan Mahmud, Sekolah Menengah Kebangsaan Sultan Yahya Petra 1, SMK Sandakan, Sekolah Menengah Kebangsaan Agama Shaikh Hj Othman Abdul Wahab, Vajiravudh College (Thailand), Hong Kong Sports School, Trafalgar High School (South Africa), Singapore International College and Scots College (New Zealand). Sekolah Menengah Kebangsaan King George VII step up into this tournament, replacing Brunei Sports School.

== Group stage ==
Defending champions Malay College Kuala Kangsar All Blacks sent out a clear warning to their rivals with a commanding performance in the group stages. The All Blacks, who took their nickname after the New Zealand national side, revelled in front of a partisan home crowd, notching one-sided wins against Sekolah Berasrama Penuh Integrasi Kuantan (31-7) and Sekolah Menengah Kebangsaan King George VII (29-0) to book their spot in the last eight. Powered by in-form standoff Mohamad Faris Pead, they hammered Kolej Yayasan Saad 43-5 in their opening game on Friday. Mohamad Faris had scored a commendable five tries for the All Blacks in their three matches. Scots College, runners-up at New Zealand's prestigious Condor Sevens last year, booked their quarterfinal berth in style with thumping wins over Sekolah Menengah Sains Selangor (36-0), Sekolah Menengah Sains Pokok Sena (62-0) and Sekolah Menengah Kebangsaan Agama Shaikh Hj Othman Abdul Wahab (45-0). Two-time champions Sekolah Sukan Tengku Mahkota Ismail also emerged unbeaten, notching wins against Trafalgar High School of South Africa (17-5), Sekolah Menengah Sultan Abdul Halim (41-5) and Sekolah Menengah Sains Sultan Mahmud (17-5).

Key to colours in group tables
Teams that progressed to the Cup/Plate quarter-finals
Teams that progressed to the Bowl quarter-finals
Teams that progressed to the Shield quarter-finals

=== Group A ===
| Team | Pld | W | D | L | GF | GA | GD | Pts |
|---|---|---|---|---|---|---|---|---|
| (Malaysia) Malay College Kuala Kangsar | 3 | 3 | 0 | 0 | 103 | 12 | +91 | 9 |
| (Malaysia) Sekolah Berasrama Penuh Integrasi Kuantan | 3 | 2 | 0 | 1 | 43 | 36 | +7 | 6 |
| (Malaysia) Kolej Yayasan Saad | 3 | 1 | 0 | 2 | 34 | 67 | −33 | 3 |
| (Malaysia) Sekolah Menengah Kebangsaan King George VII | 3 | 0 | 0 | 3 | 5 | 70 | −65 | 0 |

=== Group B ===
| Team | Pld | W | D | L | GF | GA | GD | Pts |
|---|---|---|---|---|---|---|---|---|
| (Malaysia) Sekolah Tuanku Abdul Rahman | 3 | 3 | 0 | 0 | 120 | 31 | +89 | 9 |
| (Malaysia) Sekolah Menengah Sains Hulu Selangor | 3 | 2 | 0 | 1 | 69 | 45 | +24 | 6 |
| (Malaysia) Sekolah Menengah Kebangsaan Taman Kosas | 3 | 1 | 0 | 2 | 48 | 48 | 0 | 3 |
| Singapore International College | 3 | 0 | 0 | 3 | 0 | 109 | −109 | 0 |

=== Group C ===
| Team | Pld | W | D | L | GF | GA | GD | Pts |
|---|---|---|---|---|---|---|---|---|
| (New Zealand) Scots College | 3 | 3 | 0 | 0 | 143 | 0 | +143 | 9 |
| (Malaysia) Sekolah Menengah Sains Selangor | 3 | 1 | 1 | 1 | 32 | 46 | −14 | 4 |
| (Malaysia) Sekolah Menengah Sains Pokok Sena | 3 | 1 | 0 | 2 | 15 | 94 | −79 | 3 |
| (Malaysia) ms: SMKA Shoaw | 3 | 0 | 1 | 2 | 10 | 60 | −50 | 1 |

=== Group D ===
| Team | Pld | W | D | L | GF | GA | GD | Pts |
|---|---|---|---|---|---|---|---|---|
| (Malaysia) Sekolah Sukan Tengku Mahkota Ismail | 4 | 3 | 0 | 1 | 75 | 15 | +60 | 9 |
| (South Africa) Trafalgar High School | 3 | 1 | 1 | 1 | 56 | 39 | +17 | 4 |
| (Malaysia) Sekolah Menengah Sains Sultan Mahmud | 3 | 1 | 1 | 1 | 51 | 34 | +17 | 4 |
| (Malaysia) Sekolah Menengah Sultan Abdul Halim | 3 | 0 | 0 | 3 | 10 | 67 | −57 | 0 |

=== Group E ===
| Team | Pld | W | D | L | GF | GA | GD | Pts |
|---|---|---|---|---|---|---|---|---|
| (Malaysia) Sekolah Dato' Abdul Razak | 3 | 3 | 0 | 0 | 57 | 36 | +21 | 9 |
| Hong Kong Sport School | 3 | 2 | 0 | 1 | 35 | 26 | +9 | 6 |
| (Malaysia) SMK Sandakan | 3 | 1 | 0 | 2 | 47 | 46 | +1 | 3 |
| (Malaysia) Sekolah Sultan Alam Shah | 3 | 0 | 0 | 3 | 24 | 55 | −31 | 0 |

=== Group F ===
| Team | Pld | W | D | L | GF | GA | GD | Pts |
|---|---|---|---|---|---|---|---|---|
| (Thailand) Vajiravudh College | 3 | 3 | 0 | 0 | 86 | 17 | +69 | 9 |
| (Malaysia) Sekolah Menengah Kebangsaan Sultan Yahya Petra 1 | 3 | 2 | 0 | 1 | 64 | 40 | +24 | 6 |
| (Malaysia) Victoria Institution | 3 | 1 | 0 | 2 | 43 | 73 | −30 | 3 |
| (Malaysia) Kolej Vokasional Arau | 3 | 0 | 0 | 3 | 10 | 67 | −57 | 0 |

== Finals ==
=== Shield ===
In 2013, Sekolah Sultan Alam Shah played its group matches and lost all. This year was the same story, except that it was close enough to Sekolah Dato' Abdul Razak before losing out. In 2013, Sekolah Sultan Alam Shah lost the Shield Finals to Sekolah Menengah Kebangsaan King George V (which did not make it this year). This year, Sekolah Sultan Alam Shah went one better and won the Shields Finals beating Kolej Vokasional Arau (24:0), Victoria Institution (21:10) and Sekolah Menengah Sultan Abdul Halim (25:7).

The Shield final were played with sudden death.

Quarter-finals
(Malaysia) Victoria Institution | 12
Singapore International College | 12
(Malaysia) Sekolah Sultan Alam Shah | 24
(Malaysia) Kolej Vokasional Arau | 0
(Malaysia) Sekolah Menengah Sultan Abdul Halim | 17
(Malaysia) Sekolah Menengah Sains Pokok Sena | 14
(Malaysia) Sekolah Menengah Kebangsaan Agama Shaikh Hj Othman Abdul Wahab | 12
(Malaysia) Sekolah Menengah Kebangsaan King George VII | 10

Semi-finals
(Malaysia) Victoria Institution | 10
(Malaysia) Sekolah Sultan Alam Shah | 21
(Malaysia) Sekolah Menengah Sultan Abdul Halim | 19
(Malaysia) Sekolah Menengah Kebangsaan Agama Shaikh Hj Othman Abdul Wahab | 17

Final
(Malaysia) Sekolah Sultan Alam Shah | 25
(Malaysia) Sekolah Menengah Sultan Abdul Halim | 7

=== Bowl ===
The Bowls were really the tournament of strong, but unlucky, teams. Sekolah Menengah Sains Sultan Mahmud (Cup semi-finalist in 2013) emerged Bowl winners after closing out its southern neighbour, Sekolah Berasrama Penuh Integrasi Kuantan (22:5), turning the tables (they lost in 2013) on Sekolah Menengah Sains Hulu Selangor (2013 finalist) (24:7) and besting Sekolah Menengah Kebangsaan Taman Kosas (24:7). Sekolah Menengah Kebangsaan Taman Kosas had come through after 2 up-sets; Sekolah Menengah Sains Selangor in nail-biting 14:12 and Trafalgar High School of Western Cape, South Africa (12:7). Good outing for Sekolah Menengah Kebangsaan Taman Kosas, despite having to be satisfied with runners-up medals.

Quarter-finals
(Malaysia) Sekolah Menengah Sains Hulu Selangor | 40
(Malaysia) Kolej Yayasan Saad | 0
(Malaysia) Sekolah Menengah Sains Sultan Mahmud | 22
(Malaysia) Sekolah Berasrama Penuh Integrasi Kuantan | 5
(South Africa) Trafalgar High School | 26
(Malaysia) SMK Sandakan | 22
(Malaysia) Sekolah Menengah Kebangsaan Taman Kosas | 14
(Malaysia) Sekolah Menengah Sains Selangor | 12

Semi-finals
(Malaysia) Sekolah Menengah Sains Hulu Selangor | 7
(Malaysia) Sekolah Menengah Sains Sultan Mahmud | 24
(South Africa) Trafalgar High School | 7
(Malaysia) Sekolah Menengah Kebangsaan Taman Kosas | 12

Final
(Malaysia) Sekolah Menengah Sains Sultan Mahmud | 24
(Malaysia) Sekolah Menengah Kebangsaan Taman Kosas | 7

=== Cup/Plate Quarter-finals ===
The winner of the quarter-finals gain entrance to Cup semi-finals. The defeated at this quarter final gain entrance to Plate semi-finals. The Cup/Plate Quarter finals were played with sudden death.

| (New Zealand) Scots College | 33-5 | (Malaysia) Sekolah Menengah Kebangsaan Sultan Yahya Petra 1 |
| (Malaysia) Sekolah Sukan Tunku Mahkota Ismail | 19-12 | (Thailand) Vajiravudh College |
| (Malaysia) Sekolah Tuanku Abdul Rahman | 21-17 | Hong Kong Sports School |
| (Malaysia) Malay College Kuala Kangsar | 12-12 | (Malaysia) Sekolah Dato' Abdul Razak |

=== Plate ===
Plate Finals were an international affair as last year Plate Final winner, Hong Kong Sports School, fended off Vajiravudh College 12:5 to emulate last year result. Teams had come through as losers of cup quarter finals. Hong Kong Sports School had earlier failed to maintain its early lead over Sekolah Tuanku Abdul Rahman losing out 14:21. In the plate semi-final, it met Sekolah Dato' Abdul Razak, for the second time over the weekend, and third time in two years, going ahead in the ledger, 2:1 over a tired Sekolah Dato' Abdul Razak. Sekolah Dato' Abdul Razak had earlier given away control of its cup quarter final against host MCKK Allblacks. In its cup quarter final, Vajiravudh College, despite digging deep and pushing Sekolah Sukan Tengku Mahkota Ismail physically, bowed out (12:19). Vajiravudh College came into plate finals after beating Sekolah Menengah Kebangsaan Sultan Yahya Petra 1 which was clearly exhausted after taking the first half quarter finals to Scots College, nailing a try but faded out 5:33.

Semi-finals
(Malaysia) Sekolah Menengah Kebangsaan Sultan Yahya Petra 1 | 7
(Thailand) Vajiravudh College | 10
Hong Kong Sports School | 29
(Malaysia) Sekolah Dato' Abdul Razak | 5

Final
(Thailand) Vajiravudh College | 5
Hong Kong Sports School | 12

=== Cup ===
The gulf of Asian rugby to Test playing nations was evident when Sekolah Sukan Tengku Mahkota Ismail, Malaysia's leading rugby lights and 2-time MCKK Premier 7's champion, had no answer for the rampant Scots College, the New Zealand Condor 7s runners-up 2013, who scooted to 43:0 final score in the first Cup semi-final. The second semi-finals were won by first time cup semi-finalist Sekolah Tuanku Abdul Rahman, which mischievously sneaked in two early tries, pinning down Malay College Kuala Kangsar Allblacks, the reigning MCKK Premier 7s champions. There was fight back by Malay College Kuala Kangsar coming through with 4 tries of its own, yet it was one unconverted try short of pushing another sudden death 31:26. Malay College Kuala Kangsar had earlier pushed Sekolah Dato' Abdul Razak into extra time and snatched a winner after Sekolah Dato' Abdul Razak decided to kick the ball which was returned 65 metres for a try.

The formbook who have predicted a one way final, given the previous 5 matches by Scots College which yielded at least 5 tries a game with only Sekolah Menengah Kebangsaan Sultan Yahya Petra 1 crossing its try line. It was a slight drizzle, first time finalist Sekolah Tuanku Abdul Rahman had other ideas. Sekolah Tuanku Abdul Rahman rushed to a 2 try lead through its wingers and pinned Scots College in its own half in the early minutes. The first time Scots College broke away, its ball carrier was penalised for an illegal fend off. Despite this setback and losing one player for a yellow card, Scots College managed to stay in the match and trailed into half time 12-14. The second half clearly showed why rugby is a religion in New Zealand as Scots College stepped up one gear to come out winners 36:14.

The spectators were treated to Scots College performing a rousing haka and Sekolah Tuanku Abdul Rahman contributed to the occasion by singing its school anthem. Quite contrary to recent behaviour of some other supporters, the crowd largely of Malay College Kuala Kangsar supporters were sporting enough and applauded the singing by Sekolah Tuanku Abdul Rahman.

Semi-finals
(New Zealand) Scots College | 43
(Malaysia) Sekolah Sukan Tengku Mahkota Ismail | 0
(Malaysia) Sekolah Tuanku Abdul Rahman | 31
(Malaysia) Malay College Kuala Kangsar | 26

Final
(New Zealand) Scots College | 36
(Malaysia) Sekolah Tuanku Abdul Rahman | 14

== Hosting Issues ==
After Scots College won the tournament, there is issues whether this tournament should include foreign participants which could lead to counter-productivity of the locals participant. Aziz Hassan, columnist of New Straits Times in his article said "Maybe not when it happens once but if foreign teams become the tournament's champions perennially, one can imagine how the local boys would feel, having to settle for second best despite the best of efforts."Zain Yusoff, Chairman of AllBlacks Revival programme however debunked the statement and insisted it will help the locals to get the taste of high-level competitions. His statement were on par with tournament director Amrul Hazarin Hamidin statement which the organisers, in a bid to boost the quality of the event, are looking to bring at least six foreign teams for the tournament next season.

== Sponsors ==
- Premier Sponsors - Telekom Malaysia and UEM Group
- Major Sponsors - Scomi, Ernst and Young, Land Rover, Altel Communications, Exim Bank, Carisbrook, Supreme Landmobile & Wireless Corporation, SA Kargo
- Media Partner - Karangkraf.

The tournament are also supported by Ministry of Education, Ministry of Youth and Sports and Ministry of Tourism.

== See also ==
- Rugby League World Cup
- Women's Rugby World Cup
- Rugby World Cup Overall Record
