= MCKK Premier 7's 2012 =

Malaysian youth rugby seven tournament

- Countries: Malaysia (23 teams); Thailand (1 teams)
- Tournament format(s): Group stage
- Champions: Sekolah Sukan Tengku Mahkota Ismail (2nd title)
- Matches played: 48
- Official website: Official website

The MCKK Premier 7's 2012 was the second tournament of the annual, invitational Malay College Rugby Premier Sevens, which involved teams from Malaysia premier schools, states champions and international schools (Vajiravudh College of Thailand). It were held from 25th till 26 February 2012. The tournament were won by Sekolah Sukan Tengku Mahkota Ismail with an impressive performance beating Sekolah Menengah Sultan Yahya Petra in Cup final with score 38-10 to secure the NJ Ryan Cup for two successive time.

== Competition format ==
The schedule featured a total of 48 matches, divided into half for two days. The first day were filled with groups matches. The 24 teams were grouped into 8 groups consisting of 3 teams per group. The second day were filled with tournament knock-out stages. The third placing teams of each group will contest in quarter-finals Shield while the second-placing teams of each group contested in quarter-finals Bowl. Whereas the group champions will fight their places in Cup/Plate quarter-finals.

== Group stage ==
Key to colours in group tables
Teams that progressed to the Cup/Plate quarter-finals
Teams that progressed to the Bowl quarter-finals
Teams that progressed to the Shield quarter-finals

=== Group A ===
Team	Pld	W	D	L	GF	GA	GD	Pts
(Malaysia) Sekolah Sukan Tengku Mahkota Ismail	2	2	0	0	51	17	+34	6
(Malaysia) Sekolah Menengah Sains Sultan Mahmud	2	1	0	1	34	45	−11	3
(Malaysia) Sabah College	2	0	0	2	28	51	−23	0

=== Group B ===
Team	Pld	W	D	L	GF	GA	GD	Pts
(Malaysia) Sekolah Tuanku Abdul Rahman	2	2	0	0	57	15	+42	6
(Malaysia) Sekolah Dato' Abdul Razak	2	1	0	1	48	34	+14	3
(Malaysia) Royal Military College	2	0	0	2	15	71	−56	0

=== Group C ===
Team	Pld	W	D	L	GF	GA	GD	Pts
(Malaysia) Sekolah Sultan Alam Shah	2	2	0	0	40	24	+16	6
(Malaysia) King Edward VII School	2	1	0	1	34	19	+15	3
(Malaysia) Sekolah Menengah Sains Pokok Sena	2	0	0	2	12	43	−31	0

=== Group D ===
Team	Pld	W	D	L	GF	GA	GD	Pts
(Malaysia) Sekolah Menengah Kebangsaan Agama Sheikh Hj Othman Abd Wahab	2	1	1	0	25	17	+8	4
(Malaysia) Maktab Rendah Sains Mara Kuala Terengganu	2	0	2	0	15	15	0	2
(Malaysia) Kolej Vokasional Arau	2	0	1	1	12	20	−8	1

=== Group E ===
Team	Pld	W	D	L	GF	GA	GD	Pts
(Malaysia) Malay College Kuala Kangsar	2	2	0	0	53	5	+48	6
(Malaysia) Sekolah Berasrama Penuh Integrasi Kuantan	2	1	0	1	12	27	−15	3
(Malaysia) English College Johore Bahru	2	0	0	2	0	33	−33	0

=== Group F ===
Team	Pld	W	D	L	GF	GA	GD	Pts
(Malaysia) Sekolah Menengah Sains Hulu Selangor	2	2	0	0	76	0	+76	6
(Malaysia) Victoria Institution	2	1	0	1	47	33	+14	3
(Malaysia) Bukit Mertajam High School	2	0	0	2	0	90	−90	0

=== Group G ===
Team	Pld	W	D	L	GF	GA	GD	Pts
(Malaysia) Sekolah Menengah Kebangsaan Sultan Yahya Ismail 1	2	2	0	0	64	0	+64	6
(Malaysia) Sekolah Menengah Kebangsaaan Taman Kosas	2	1	0	1	36	26	+10	3
(Malaysia) Kolej Sultan Abdul Hamid	2	0	0	2	0	74	−74	0

=== Group H ===
Team	Pld	W	D	L	GF	GA	GD	Pts
(Malaysia) Sekolah Menengah Sains Selangor	2	2	0	0	36	22	+14	6
(Thailand) Vajiravudh College	2	1	0	1	27	29	−2	3
(Malaysia) Kolej Yayasan Saad	2	0	0	2	24	56	−32	0

== Finals ==
=== Shield ===
Quarter-finals
(Malaysia) Sabah College	21
(Malaysia) Royal Military College	19
(Malaysia) Sekolah Menengah Sains Pokok Sena	0
(Malaysia) Kolej Vokasional Arau	19
(Malaysia) English College Johore Bahru	41
(Malaysia) Bukit Mertajam High School	0
(Malaysia) Kolej Sultan Abdul Hamid	0
(Malaysia) Kolej Yayasan Saad	15

Semi-finals
(Malaysia) Sabah College	5
(Malaysia) Kolej Vokasional Arau	17
(Malaysia) English College Johore Bahru	0
(Malaysia) Kolej Yayasan Saad	36

Final
(Malaysia) Kolej Vokasional Arau	17
(Malaysia) Kolej Yayasan Saad	14

=== Bowl ===
Quarter-finals
(Malaysia) Sekolah Menengah Sains Sultan Mahmud	19
(Malaysia) Sekolah Dato' Abdul Razak	14
(Malaysia) King Edward VII School	17
(Malaysia) Maktab Rendah Sains Mara Kuala Terengganu	10
(Malaysia) Sekolah Berasrama Penuh Integrasi Kuantan	24
(Malaysia) Victoria Institution	19
(Malaysia) Sekolah Menengah Kebangsaaan Taman Kosas	5
(Thailand) Vajiravudh College	20

Semi-finals
(Malaysia) Sekolah Menengah Sains Sultan Mahmud	24
(Malaysia) King Edward VII School	12
(Malaysia) Sekolah Berasrama Penuh Integrasi Kuantan	0
(Thailand) Vajiravudh College	15

Final
(Malaysia) Sekolah Menengah Sains Sultan Mahmud	12
(Thailand) Vajiravudh College	24

=== Cup/Plate Quarter-finals ===
The winner of the quarter-finals gain entrance to Cup semi-finals. The defeated at this quarter final gain entrance to Plate semi-finals.

(Malaysia) Sekolah Sukan Tengku Mahkota Ismail	12-5	(Malaysia) Sekolah Tuanku Abdul Rahman
(Malaysia) Sekolah Sultan Alam Shah	7-22	(Malaysia) Sekolah Menengah Kebangsaan Agama Sheikh Hj Othman Abd Wahab
(Malaysia) Malay College Kuala Kangsar	14-12	(Malaysia) Sekolah Menengah Sains Hulu Selangor
(Malaysia) Sekolah Menengah Kebangsaan Sultan Yahya Ismail 1	21-15	(Malaysia) Sekolah Menengah Sains Selangor

=== Plate ===
Semi-finals
(Malaysia) Sekolah Menengah Sains Hulu Selangor	14
(Malaysia) Sekolah Menengah Sains Selangor	12
(Malaysia) Sekolah Tuanku Abdul Rahman	29
(Malaysia) Sekolah Sultan Alam Shah	0

Final
(Malaysia) Sekolah Menengah Sains Hulu Selangor	19
(Malaysia) Sekolah Tuanku Abdul Rahman	15

=== Cup ===
Semi-finals
(Malaysia) Sekolah Sukan Tengku Mahkota Ismail	19
(Malaysia) Sekolah Menengah Kebangsaan Agama Sheikh Hj Othman Abd Wahab	17
(Malaysia) Malay College Kuala Kangsar	7
(Malaysia) Sekolah Menengah Kebangsaan Sultan Yahya Petra 1	12

Final
(Malaysia) Sekolah Sukan Tengku Mahkota Ismail	38
(Malaysia) Sekolah Menengah Kebangsaan Sultan Yahya Petra 1	10

== Sponsors ==
- Premier Sponsor - Government of Malaysia and Telekom Malaysia
- Major Sponsors - UEM Group, Scomi, Air Asia, MTU Services, Hopetech, Ernst and Young, Sissons Paints, Saji, Karangkraf
- Official Drink - Gatorade
- Official Car - Proton
- Official Radio - AMP
- Official Rugby Equipment - Salbros
- Official Logistics - SA Kargo
- Official Medical Service Provider - KPJ Healthcare

== See also ==
- Rugby League World Cup
- Women's Rugby World Cup
- Rugby World Cup Overall Record
