= MCKK Premier 7's 2011 =

Malaysian youth rugby seven tournament

MCKK Premier 7s 2011
- Countries: Malaysia (23 teams); Thailand (1 teams)
- Tournament format(s): Group stage
- Champions: Sekolah Sukan Tengku Mahkota Ismail (1st title)
- Matches played: 48
- Official website: Official website

The MCKK Premier 7s 2011 was the first tournament of Malay College Rugby Premier Sevens, which involved teams from Malaysia premier schools and international schools (Vajiravudh College of Thailand). It were held from 26th till 27 February 2011. It were sponsored by DiGi as title sponsor. The tournament were won by Sekolah Sukan Tengku Mahkota Ismail which beaten Sekolah Menengah Sultan Yahya Petra in Cup final with score 36-7 to claim the first title. Vajiravudh College send their under 16 team in this inaugural tournament.

== Competition format ==
The schedule featured a total of 48 matches, divided into half for two days. The first day were filled with groups matches. The 24 teams were grouped into 8 groups consisting of 3 teams per group. The second day were filled with tournament knock-out stages. The third placing teams of each group will contest in quarter-finals Shield while the second-placing teams of each group contested in quarter-finals Bowl. Whereas the group champions will fight their places in Cup/Plate quarter-finals.

== Group stage ==
Key to colours in group tables
Teams that progressed to the Cup/Plate quarter-finals
Teams that progressed to the Bowl quarter-finals
Teams that progressed to the Shield quarter-finals

=== Group A ===
Team	Pld	W	D	L	GF	GA	GD	Pts
(Malaysia) English College Johore Bahru	2	2	0	0	35	12	+23	6
(Malaysia) Malay College Kuala Kangsar	2	1	0	1	36	21	+15	3
(Malaysia) Malacca High School	2	0	0	2	0	38	−38	0

=== Group B ===
Team	Pld	W	D	L	GF	GA	GD	Pts
(Malaysia) Sekolah Menengah Kebangsaan Sultan Yahya Petra 1	2	2	0	0	22	5	+17	6
(Malaysia) Kolej Sultan Abdul Hamid	2	0	1	1	12	12	0	1
(Malaysia) Kolej Yayasan Saad	2	0	1	1	7	17	−10	1

=== Group C ===
Team	Pld	W	D	L	GF	GA	GD	Pts
(Malaysia) Sekolah Tuanku Abdul Rahman	2	2	0	0	38	10	+28	6
(Malaysia) Sekolah Menengah Kebangsaan Taman Kosas	2	1	0	1	22	31	−9	3
(Malaysia) Sekolah Menengah Sains Sultan Mahmud	2	0	0	2	17	36	−19	0

=== Group D ===
Team	Pld	W	D	L	GF	GA	GD	Pts
(Malaysia) Maktab Rendah Sains Mara Kuala Terengganu	2	2	0	0	29	12	+17	6
(Malaysia) Sekolah Sultan Alam Shah	2	1	0	1	48	22	+26	3
(Malaysia) Sekolah Menengah Kebangsaan King Edward VII	2	0	0	2	5	48	−43	0

=== Group E ===
Team	Pld	W	D	L	GF	GA	GD	Pts
(Thailand) Vajiravudh College	2	1	0	1	43	24	+19	3
(Malaysia) Sekolah Menengah Kebangsaan Agama Sheikh Hj Othman Abd Wahab	2	1	0	1	29	33	−4	3
(Malaysia) Victoria Institution	2	1	0	1	26	41	−15	3

=== Group F ===
Team	Pld	W	D	L	GF	GA	GD	Pts
(Malaysia) Sekolah Menengah Sains Pokok Sena	2	2	0	0	52	10	+42	6
(Malaysia) Sekolah Menengah Sains Selangor	2	1	0	1	39	14	+25	3
(Malaysia) Sekolah Menengah Kebangsaan King George V	2	0	0	2	0	67	−67	0

=== Group G ===
Team	Pld	W	D	L	GF	GA	GD	Pts
(Malaysia) Sekolah Sukan Tengku Mahkota Ismail	2	2	0	0	77	0	+77	6
(Malaysia) Royal Military College	2	1	0	1	46	32	+14	3
(Malaysia) Sekolah Menengah Kebangsaan Syed Sirajuddin	2	0	0	2	0	91	−91	0

=== Group H ===
Team	Pld	W	D	L	GF	GA	GD	Pts
(Malaysia) Sekolah Menengah Sains Hulu Selangor	2	2	0	0	48	17	+31	6
(Malaysia) Sekolah Dato' Abdul Razak	2	1	0	1	57	22	+35	3
(Malaysia) Bukit Mertajam High School	2	0	0	2	12	78	−66	0

== Finals ==
=== Shield ===
Quarter-finals
(Malaysia) Malacca High School	7
(Malaysia) Kolej Yayasan Saad	5
(Malaysia) Sekolah Menengah Sains Sultan Mahmud	26
(Malaysia) Sekolah Menengah Kebangsaan King Edward VII	5
(Malaysia) Victoria Institution	7
(Malaysia) Sekolah Menengah Kebangsaan King George V	5
(Malaysia) Sekolah Menengah Kebangsaan Syed Sirajuddin	0
(Malaysia) Bukit Mertajam High School	24

Semi-finals
(Malaysia) Malacca High School	5
(Malaysia) Sekolah Menengah Sains Sultan Mahmud	21
(Malaysia) Victoria Institution	7
(Malaysia) Bukit Mertajam High School	17

Final
(Malaysia) Sekolah Menengah Sains Sultan Mahmud	33
(Malaysia) Bukit Mertajam High School	0

=== Bowl ===
Quarter-finals
(Malaysia) Malay College Kuala Kangsar	15
(Malaysia) Kolej Sultan Abdul Hamid	10
(Malaysia) Sekolah Menengah Kebangsaan Taman Kosas	7
(Malaysia) Sekolah Sultan Alam Shah	17
(Malaysia) Sekolah Menengah Kebangsaan Agama Sheikh Hj Othman Abd Wahab	5
(Malaysia) Sekolah Menengah Sains Selangor	17
(Malaysia) Royal Military College	7
(Malaysia) Sekolah Dato' Abdul Razak	19

Semi-finals
(Malaysia) Malay College Kuala Kangsar	12
(Malaysia) Sekolah Sultan Alam Shah	10
(Malaysia) Sekolah Dato' Abdul Razak	14
(Malaysia) Sekolah Menengah Sains Selangor	12

Final
(Malaysia) Malay College Kuala Kangsar	7
(Malaysia) Sekolah Dato' Abdul Razak	24

=== Cup/Plate Quarter-finals ===
The winner of the quarter-finals gain entrance to Cup semi-finals. The defeated at this quarter final gain entrance to Plate semi-finals.

(Malaysia) English College Johore Bahru	7-17	(Malaysia) Sekolah Menengah Kebangsaan Sultan Yahya Petra 1
(Malaysia) Sekolah Tuanku Abdul Rahman	7-12	(Malaysia) Maktab Rendah Sains Mara Kuala Terengganu
(Thailand) Vajiravudh College	7-22	(Malaysia) Sekolah Menengah Sains Pokok Sena
(Malaysia) Sekolah Sukan Tengku Mahkota Ismail	19-10	(Malaysia) Sekolah Menengah Sains Hulu Selangor

=== Plate ===
Semi-finals
(Malaysia) English College Johore Bahru	14
(Malaysia) Sekolah Tuanku Abdul Rahman	26
(Thailand) Vajiravudh College	0
(Malaysia) Sekolah Menengah Sains Hulu Selangor	27

Final
(Malaysia) Sekolah Menengah Sains Hulu Selangor	5
(Malaysia) Sekolah Tuanku Abdul Rahman	24

=== Cup ===
Semi-finals
(Malaysia) Sekolah Menengah Kebangsaan Sultan Yahya Petra 1	24
(Malaysia) Maktab Rendah Sains Mara Kuala Terengganu	7
(Malaysia) Sekolah Sukan Tengku Mahkota Ismail	12
(Malaysia) Sekolah Menengah Sains Pokok Sena	7

Final
(Malaysia) Sekolah Sukan Tengku Mahkota Ismail	36
(Malaysia) Sekolah Menengah Kebangsaan Sultan Yahya Petra 1	7

== Sponsors ==
- Title Sponsor - DiGi Telecommunications
- Premier Sponsors - Telekom Malaysia and UEM Group
- Corporate Sponsors - CIMB Foundation, MTU Services, Hopetech, Scomi, Puspakom, Proton, Permanis Sandilands and Carisbrook.

== See also ==
- Rugby League World Cup
- Women's Rugby World Cup
- Rugby World Cup Overall Record
