= MCKK Premier 7's 2013 =

Malaysian youth rugby seven tournament

- Countries: Malaysia (21 teams); Thailand (1 team); Brunei (1 team); Hong Kong (1 team)
- Tournament format(s): Group stage
- Champions: Malay College Kuala Kangsar (First title)
- Matches played: 48
- Official website: Official website

The MCKK Premier 7's 2013 was the third edition of the annual, invitational Malay College Rugby Premier Sevens, which involved teams from Malaysia premier schools, states champions and international schools. Brunei International School and Hong Kong Sports School joined in the fray as international participant, other than Vajiravudh College of Thailand.Singapore withdrew their participation this year and is replaced by Maktab Rendah Sains Mara Kuala Terengganu It was held from 22 till 24 February 2013. The defending champions, Sekolah Sukan Tengku Mahkota Ismail were shocked by their first defeat in the tournament after two undefeated editions which led to its failure of retaining the NJ Ryan Cup. However, it wrapped up this edition as Bowl champion. After two editions, the host, Malay College Kuala Kangsar, finally were crowned as the new champions, defeating Sekolah Menengah Sains Hulu Selangor in Cup final with score 19–7.

== Competition format ==
The tournament were played as 7-a-side match in accordance with variation of International Rugby Board (IRB) Sevens rules. Due to popular requests by the participating teams, the tournament format of eight groups to three have changed to six groups of four. This resulted in each team playing an additional game during the preliminary rounds which entailed the Tournament to be held over three days with six preliminary matches being played on the first day with the remainder played on the second day. Six games will played on Friday starting at 4 pm followed by 30 games on Saturday, starting from 8 am for the preliminary rounds. The teams will then be ranked and grouped into four categories - Championship, Plate, Bowl and Shield. A total of 24 matches for the knockout stages will be played on the final day of the tournament. For each match duration for all the matches will be seven minutes for each half of two with a one-minute break in between. For the finals, 10 minutes will be given for each half as well as an additional one-minute between the interval.

== Group stage ==
The group stage concluded with much surprise. The most surprising being the poor showing by two seeded teams, namely two-time defending Champions, Sekolah Sukan Tunku Mahkota Ismail of Johor, and Cup Semifinalist Sekolah Menengah Kebangsaan Agama Shaikh Hj Othman Abdul Wahab of Sarawak, which resulted in both schools missing out on the Cup Quarter-finals.

At the end of the group stage, Sekolah Menengah Sains Pokok Sena topped Group A leaving tournament favourites languishing in third place behind newcomers of La Salle Secondary School of Sabah. Group B's seeded team, Sekolah Menengah Kebangsaan Agama Shaikh Hj Othman Abdul Wahab, also placed third in its Group which was headed by Sekolah Menengah Sains Sultan Mahmud. Another seeded team which failed to top its group and missed the Cup Quarter-finals was Sekolah Tuanku Abdul Rahman, Ipoh, Perak when it lost to international newcomer, Hong Kong Sports School in a pulsating and absorbing final game of Group E. The three other seeded teams, i.e. hosts Malay College Kuala Kangsar, East Coast powerhouse, Sekolah Menengah Kebangsaan Sultan Yahya Petra 1, and State champion, Sekolah Menengah Sains Hulu Selangor, justified their seeding by winning their respective groups in convincing fashion.

Joining the six group winners are the two best second placed teams – Kolej Yayasan Saad of Melaka and Negeri Sembilan’s Sekolah Dato' Abdul Razak from Groups B and F respectively. The four other second placed teams, i.e. newcomers La Salle Secondary School and Brunei International School as well as Sekolah Menengah Sains Selangor and Sekolah Tuanku Abdul Rahman will compete in the Bowl Competition with four third place teams, namely defending Bowl Winner, Vajiravudh College of Thailand, Sekolah Menengah Kebangsaan Taman Kosas of Selangor and the aforementioned fallen giants Sekolah Sukan Tunku Mahkota Ismail and Sekolah Menengah Kebangsaan Agama Shaikh Hj Othman Abdul Wahab.

Third placed teams Victoria Institution and Sekolah Berasrama Penuh Integrasi Kuantan, will have to settle with playing in the Shield Competition against Sekolah Sultan Alam Shah of Putrajaya, Maktab Rendah Sains MARA Balik Pulau of Penang, Sekolah Menengah Sultan Abdul Halim of Kedah, Sekolah Menengah Kebangsaan King George V, Kolej Vokasional Arau and Maktab Rendah Sains Mara Kuala Terengganu.

Key to colours in group tables
Teams that progressed to the Cup/Plate quarter-finals
Teams that progressed to the Bowl quarter-finals
Teams that progressed to the Shield quarter-finals

=== Group A ===
| Team | Pld | W | D | L | GF | GA | GD | Pts |
|---|---|---|---|---|---|---|---|---|
| (Malaysia) Sekolah Menengah Sains Pokok Sena | 3 | 3 | 0 | 0 | 83 | 10 | +73 | 9 |
| (Malaysia) La Salle Secondary School | 3 | 2 | 0 | 1 | 26 | 47 | −21 | 6 |
| (Malaysia) Sekolah Sukan Tengku Mahkota Ismail | 3 | 1 | 2 | 0 | 29 | 32 | −3 | 5 |
| (Malaysia) Sekolah Sultan Alam Shah | 3 | 0 | 3 | 0 | 25 | 74 | −49 | 3 |

=== Group B ===
| Team | Pld | W | D | L | GF | GA | GD | Pts |
|---|---|---|---|---|---|---|---|---|
| (Malaysia) Sekolah Menengah Sains Sultan Mahmud | 3 | 3 | 0 | 0 | 96 | 5 | +91 | 9 |
| (Malaysia) Kolej Yayasan Saad | 3 | 2 | 0 | 1 | 69 | 29 | +40 | 6 |
| (Malaysia) Sekolah Menengah Kebangsaan Agama Shaikh Hj Othman Abdul Wahab | 3 | 1 | 0 | 2 | 43 | 63 | −20 | 3 |
| (Malaysia) Maktab Rendah Sains MARA Balik Pulau | 3 | 0 | 0 | 3 | 5 | 116 | −111 | 0 |

=== Group C ===
| Team | Pld | W | D | L | GF | GA | GD | Pts |
|---|---|---|---|---|---|---|---|---|
| (Malaysia) Malay College Kuala Kangsar | 3 | 3 | 0 | 0 | 96 | 10 | +86 | 9 |
| Brunei International School | 3 | 2 | 0 | 1 | 49 | 60 | −11 | 6 |
| (Malaysia) Victoria Institution | 3 | 0 | 1 | 2 | 34 | 70 | −36 | 1 |
| (Malaysia) Sekolah Menengah Sultan Abdul Halim | 3 | 0 | 1 | 2 | 26 | 65 | −39 | 1 |

=== Group D ===
| Team | Pld | W | D | L | GF | GA | GD | Pts |
|---|---|---|---|---|---|---|---|---|
| (Malaysia) Sekolah Menengah Kebangsaan Sultan Yahya Petra 1 | 3 | 2 | 0 | 1 | 59 | 20 | +39 | 6 |
| (Malaysia) Sekolah Menengah Sains Selangor | 3 | 2 | 0 | 1 | 42 | 41 | +1 | 6 |
| (Malaysia) Sekolah Menengah Kebangsaan Taman Kosas | 3 | 2 | 0 | 1 | 32 | 50 | −18 | 6 |
| (Malaysia) Sekolah Menengah Kebangsaan King George V | 3 | 0 | 0 | 3 | 29 | 51 | −22 | 0 |

=== Group E ===
| Team | Pld | W | D | L | GF | GA | GD | Pts |
|---|---|---|---|---|---|---|---|---|
| Hong Kong Sport School | 3 | 3 | 0 | 0 | 94 | 28 | +66 | 9 |
| (Malaysia) Sekolah Tuanku Abdul Rahman | 3 | 2 | 0 | 1 | 68 | 58 | +10 | 6 |
| (Malaysia) Sekolah Berasrama Penuh Integrasi Kuantan | 3 | 1 | 0 | 2 | 29 | 65 | −36 | 3 |
| (Malaysia) Kolej Vokasional Arau | 3 | 0 | 0 | 3 | 19 | 59 | −40 | 0 |

=== Group F ===
| Team | Pld | W | D | L | GF | GA | GD | Pts |
|---|---|---|---|---|---|---|---|---|
| (Malaysia) Sekolah Menengah Sains Hulu Selangor | 3 | 3 | 0 | 0 | 74 | 19 | +55 | 9 |
| (Malaysia) Sekolah Dato' Abdul Razak | 3 | 2 | 0 | 1 | 58 | 41 | +17 | 6 |
| (Thailand) Vajiravudh College | 3 | 1 | 0 | 2 | 34 | 47 | −13 | 3 |
| (Malaysia) Maktab Rendah Sains Mara Kuala Terengganu | 3 | 0 | 0 | 3 | 17 | 76 | −59 | 0 |

== Finals ==
=== Shield ===
Quarter-finals
(Malaysia) Sekolah Berasrama Penuh Integrasi Kuantan | 22
(Malaysia) Maktab Rendah Sains MARA Balik Pulau | 12
(Malaysia) Sekolah Menengah Kebangsaan King George V | 24
(Malaysia) Kolej Vokasional Arau | 5
(Malaysia) Victoria Institution | 14
(Malaysia) Maktab Rendah Sains Mara Kuala Terengganu | 19
(Malaysia) Sekolah Menengah Sultan Abdul Halim | 0
(Malaysia) Sekolah Sultan Alam Shah | 24

Semi-finals
(Malaysia) Sekolah Berasrama Penuh Integrasi Kuantan | 5
(Malaysia) Sekolah Menengah Kebangsaan King George V | 12
(Malaysia) Maktab Rendah Sains Mara Kuala Terengganu | 12
(Malaysia) Sekolah Sultan Alam Shah | 14

Final
(Malaysia) Sekolah Menengah Kebangsaan King George V | 15
(Malaysia) Sekolah Sultan Alam Shah | 12

=== Bowl ===
The Bowl final were played with extra time and sudden death.

Quarter-finals
(Malaysia) Sekolah Tuanku Abdul Rahman | 24
(Malaysia) Sekolah Menengah Kebangsaan Agama Shaikh Hj Othman Abdul Wahab | 12
(Malaysia) La Salle Secondary School | 12
(Malaysia) Sekolah Menengah Kebangsaan Taman Kosas | 10
(Malaysia) Sekolah Menengah Sains Selangor | 10
(Thailand) Vajiravudh College | 5
Brunei International School | 7
(Malaysia) Sekolah Sukan Tengku Mahkota Ismail | 12

Semi-finals
(Malaysia) Sekolah Tuanku Abdul Rahman | 35
(Malaysia) La Salle Secondary School | 7
(Malaysia) Sekolah Menengah Sains Selangor | 10
(Malaysia) Sekolah Sukan Tengku Mahkota Ismail | 12

Final
(Malaysia) Sekolah Tuanku Abdul Rahman | 28
(Malaysia) Sekolah Sukan Tengku Mahkota Ismail | 33

=== Cup/Plate Quarter-finals ===
The winner of the quarter-finals gain entrance to Cup semi-finals. The defeated at this quarter final gain entrance to Plate semi-finals.

| (Malaysia) Sekolah Menengah Sains Sultan Mahmud | 31-5 | (Malaysia) Sekolah Dato' Abdul Razak |
| Hong Kong Sport School | 0-12 | (Malaysia) Sekolah Menengah Sains Hulu Selangor |
| (Malaysia) Malay College Kuala Kangsar | 26-12 | (Malaysia) Kolej Yayasan Saad |
| (Malaysia) Sekolah Menengah Sains Pokok Sena | 29-7 | (Malaysia) Sekolah Menengah Kebangsaan Sultan Yahya Ismail 1 |

=== Plate ===
Semi-finals
(Malaysia) Sekolah Dato' Abdul Razak | 17
Hong Kong Sport School | 19
(Malaysia) Kolej Yayasan Saad | 7
(Malaysia) Sekolah Menengah Kebangsaan Sultan Yahya Petra 1 | 17

Final
Hong Kong Sport School | 46
(Malaysia) Sekolah Menengah Kebangsaan Sultan Yahya Petra 1 | 12

=== Cup ===
Semi-finals
(Malaysia) Sekolah Menengah Sains Sultan Mahmud | 5
(Malaysia) Sekolah Menengah Sains Hulu Selangor | 27
(Malaysia) Malay College Kuala Kangsar | 19
(Malaysia) Sekolah Menengah Sains Pokok Sena | 5

Final
(Malaysia) Sekolah Menengah Sains Hulu Selangor | 7
(Malaysia) Malay College Kuala Kangsar | 19

== Sponsors ==
- Premier Sponsor - Telekom Malaysia
- Major Sponsors - UEM Group, Scomi, MTU Services, Ernst and Young, Sissons Paints, Genting Plantations, Agro Bank Malaysia, Land Rover, Karangkraf
- Official Car - Land Rover
- Official Medical Service Provider - KPJ Healthcare
- Official Logistics - SA Kargo
- Official Printer - Karangkraf
- Official Communication Service Provider - Supreme Landmobile & Wireless

The tournament also receives the support from the Ministry of Education (Malaysia), The State Government of Perak, Majlis Perbandaran Kuala Kangsar, Jabatan Kerja Raya and all local authorities in the Kuala Kangsar district.

== See also ==
- Rugby League World Cup
- Women's Rugby World Cup
- Rugby World Cup Overall Record
