= Rajavit–Vajiravudh Traditional Rugby Match =

- Founded: 1983
- Country: Thailand
- Number of clubs: 2 (King's College and Vajiravudh College)
- Domestic cup(s): Royal Trophy; His Majesty King Bhumibol Adulyadej
- Current champions: King's College
- Most championships: King's College (16 titles)

Rajavit–Vajiravudh Traditional Rugby Match is an annual Traditional rugby match between two private all-boys boarding schools in Thailand, King’s College and Vajiravudh College. It is held to strengthen the unity of teachers and students, and to encourage esprit de corp and the unity between members of both institutions. The income from the competition is donated to charity.

The two teams have competed 25 times; King’s College won 16 times, Vajiravudh College won seven times, and there were two draws.

== History ==
In the reign of King Rama VI, there was an annual sports event, held in front of the palace, between schools in the department of the chamberlain (schools under the patronage). On the day of the event, all teachers and students under the patronage had an audience with the king at Mahadlekluang School (the current Vajiravudh College).

In reign of King Rama VII, a period of financial crisis required a decrease in the royal court's expenses. King’s College and Mahadlekluang School were combined under the name Vajiravudh College on April 16, 1926, to be a royal memorial to His Majesty the King Rama VI. King Rama IX re-established King’s College and accepted it under royal patronage, and organized the first traditional rugby match (Royal Trophy) on November 11, 1983.

== Result of the match ==
King's College won 16 titles, Vajiravudh College won seven titles and drew two times.

Time	result	score
1	KC won VC	7-0
2	draw	12-12
3	KC won VC	7-0
4	VC won KC	7-6
5	VC won KC	17-14
6	VC won KC	18-16
7	KC won VC	4-3
8	KC won VC	14-11
9	KC won VC	21-8
10	KC won VC	26-3
11	KC won VC	19-17
12	KC won VC	22-18
13	KC won VC	26-16
14	VC won KC	4-0
15	KC won VC	29-21
16	VC won KC	2-0
17	KC won VC	11-10
18	VC won KC	8-5
19	KC won VC	23-22
20	KC won VC	23-22
21	draw	16-16
22	KC won VC	34-20
23	VC won KC	27-22
24	VC won KC	15-10
25	KC won VC	12-10
