= Royal Pages School =

Royal Pages School is the English name of two different Thai institutions:

- The Royal Pages School (Thai: โรงเรียนมหาดเล็ก) was the precursor to Chulalongkorn University which existed from 1 April 1902 to 1 January 1911, after which it was reestablished as the Civil Service College of King Chulalongkorn.
- The Royal Pages School (โรงเรียนมหาดเล็กหลวง) was the name of Vajiravudh College prior to its merger with King's College (โรงเรียนราชวิทยาลัย) on 16 April 1926.
