= Malay College Rugby Premier Sevens =

Malaysian youth rugby seven tournament

- Sport: Rugby sevens
- Instituted: 2011
- Number of teams: 24
- Country: Malaysia (Malay College Kuala Kangsar)
- Holders: Sekolah Sukan Malaysia Pahang (2025)
- Most titles: Sekolah Sukan Tengku Mahkota Ismail (5 titles); Malay College Kuala Kangsar, Scots College and Hong Kong Sports School (1 title)

The MCKK Premier 7s is an annual under 18 rugby seven tournament between the premier and international schools rugby sevens teams. The tournament was first held in 2011. The winners are awarded the NJ Ryan Cup, named after the last foreigner headmaster that lifted up the school rugby team in the past.

The tournament is administered by Malay College Kuala Kangsar and Malay College Old Boys Association with the sub committee, All-Blacks Revival (ABR). The tournament is also on the verge of being recognized by International Rugby Board with help by Malaysian Rugby Union. Since 2014, the tagline for this tournament is "Premiering Talent and Sportsmanship".

== History ==
The sport of rugby union was first introduced at MCKK in 1956 under the leadership of Headmaster N.J. Ryan. The name “MCKK All-Blacks” was taken from the national rugby union team of New Zealand national team, and the program has had considerable prominence in Malaysian schools' rugby tournaments.

The Tournament is the brainchild of the All Blacks Revival Committee (ABR), a group of the school rugby playing alumni who came together to revive and infuse new life into the proud tradition of rugby excellence at MCKK. Joint Organizing Committee Chairman Zain Yusoff said, "Our participation in the sport during our school days played a key role in our development and growth as people, and we wanted the current students at the school to have the same experiences we did. We invited schools which had the same commitment to rugby as we did, and a history of excellence in the game to compete at what we hope will become the most prestigious tournament for 7-a-side rugby in the country."

Zain Yusoff added, "Team sports like rugby fostered school spirit and respect for rivals, sportsmanship and fairplay. These values cannot be taught from textbooks but have to be lived to be understood. And we are delighted by the support we have been given by the Ministry of Education who bought into our point of view and have given us their whole-hearted support to raise the game under their 'One Student, One Sport program'".

Zain Yusoff concluded, "This Tournament is more than just about playing a game. All of us from MCKK are looking forward to sharing our culture and hospitality with the participating schools. For many of us, it a way of giving back something to the younger generation. It about sharing values, learning through experience, and of course, enjoying the game we all love so much." After six tournaments, the NJ Ryan Cup have traveled to three countries (Malaysia, New Zealand and Hong Kong). Sekolah Sukan Tengku Mahkota Ismail of Malaysia have won the cup a record-three time followed by home team, MCKK, Scots College of New Zealand and Hong Kong Sports school (each once) .

== Objectives ==
The objectives of this tournament are mainly to raise the standards of rugby amongst schools in Malaysia apart from fostering closer relations amongst participating teams and students.

== Champions and finalist ==
Sekolah Sukan Tengku Mahkota Ismail have been a major force in this tournament, emerging winners 5 times (2011,2012, 2016, 2017, 2024) and runner-up thrice. The host, Sekolah Menengah Sains Hulu Selangor, Sekolah Menengah Kebangsaan Sri Mersing, English College Johore Bahru, Sekolah Menengah Kebangsaan Jalan Tiga, Sekolah Sukan Malaysia Pahang, Scots College and Hong Kong Sports Schools have each lifted the cup once.

Year	Champions	Runners-up	Score
2011	Sekolah Sukan Tengku Mahkota Ismail	Sekolah Menengah Kebangsaan Sultan Yahya Petra 1	36-7
2012	Sekolah Sukan Tengku Mahkota Ismail	Sekolah Menengah Kebangsaan Sultan Yahya Petra 1	38-10
2013	Malay College Kuala Kangsar	Sekolah Menengah Sains Hulu Selangor	19-7
2014	Scots College	Sekolah Tuanku Abdul Rahman	36-14
2015	Hong Kong Sports Schools	Scots College	31-12
2016	Sekolah Sukan Tengku Mahkota Ismail	Hong Kong Sports Schools	28-22
2017	Sekolah Sukan Tengku Mahkota Ismail	Hong Kong Sports Schools	38-10
2018	Sekolah Menengah Kebangsaan Sri Mersing	Sekolah Sukan Tengku Mahkota Ismail	14-12
2019	Sekolah Menengah Sains Hulu Selangor	Malay College Kuala Kangsar	24-10
2020	English College Johore Bahru	Sekolah Sukan Tengku Mahkota Ismail	15-12
2023	Sekolah Menengah Kebangsaan Jalan Tiga	Sekolah Sukan Malaysia Pahang	24-0
2024	Sekolah Sukan Tengku Mahkota Ismail	Sekolah Menengah Kebangsaan Jalan Tiga	36-5
2025	Sekolah Sukan Malaysia Pahang	Sekolah Sukan Tengku Mahkota Ismail	17-12

== Hosting issues ==
After Scots College won the 2014 tournament, there is issues whether this tournament should include foreign participants which could lead to counter-productivity of the locals participant. Aziz Hassan, columnist of New Straits Times in his article said "Maybe not when it happens once but if foreign teams become the tournament's champions perennially, one can imagine how the local boys would feel, having to settle for second best despite the best of efforts."Zain Yusoff, Chairman of AllBlacks Revival programme however debunked the statement and insisted it will help the locals to get the taste of high-level competitions. His statement were on par with tournament director Amrul Hazarin Hamidon statement which the organisers, in a bid to boost the quality of the event, are looking to bring at least six foreign teams for the tournament next season.

== See also ==
- Rugby League World Cup
- Women's Rugby World Cup
- Rugby World Cup Overall Record
