= Halim Saad =

Malaysian businessman

Yang Berbahagia Tan Sri Dato' Sri Halim Saad PSM SSAP SPMP SIMP DCSM DPMP DSAP
- Born: 20 October 1953 (age 72)
- Education: Victoria University of Wellington Malay College Kuala Kangsar
- Honours: Commander of the Order of Loyalty to the Crown of Malaysia

Tan Sri Dato' Sri Halim bin Saad (born 20 October 1953) was known as the leading businessman of Renong / UEM Group in corporate Malaysia from 1985 to 2001. The Renong / UEM Group was the largest corporate company in Malaysia at the time, with investments in almost every major sector in Malaysia; from Highway concessions, Bridge concession, Hotels, Hospitals, Pharmaceutical Products, Telecommunications, Light Rail Transit, Bus Fleets, International Airport Builder (KLIA), Malaysia National Sports Complex, Television & Media Network and even Print Media. After leaving Renong / UEM Group in 2001, Tan Sri Halim Saad founded Markmore Group having local and oversea investments. Portfolios included; Oil & Gas - Onshore Exploration and Production, Mining concession, Renewable Energy, Construction and Property Development, Telecommunication Infrastructure, Education.

== Associate ==
The media shy Halim Saad is connected to former Finance Ministers Tun Daim Zainuddin and Anwar Ibrahim. Halim Saad in the past, alleged to finance UMNO, Malaysia's dominant political party during Tun Dr. Mahathir premiership.

== Corporate record and achievements ==
=== UEM ===
In 1984, United Engineers Malaysia (UEM) was a declining company when Halim Saad bought majority shares. The company acted as a vehicle for Halim Saad to bid for the largest project in Malaysia at the time, the 800 km North South Expressway project. UEM won the bid and was awarded a concession in 1986. UEM then set up a new company called PLUS to implement the concession. The scale and magnitude of risk management and contract has never been experienced by or practiced by any companies in Malaysia at the time. PLUS had to build a highway from Thailand to Singapore within 7 years including operating and maintaining it. The task included financing and building 300 Bridges, 70 intersections, 40 lay-bys and 18 rest and service areas. There were about 100 major contracts and 400 minor contracts entered into by PLUS with local contractors.

Despite the risk of inexperience local contractors, the bigger picture was that it provides opportunities for local contractors both BumiPutera and Non Bumi to respond to 'New Challenges' and develop their expertise. The project completed in September 1994 with 1 year ahead of schedule. This transformed Peninsular Malaysia with new infrastructure system and became the main impetus of economic development and growth to the country. States and Cities connectivity on a new level.

=== UEM / Renong ===
Between 1988 and 1993, UEM had acquired and created 29 companies as part of a framework to ensure that essential supplies and services for highway construction and maintenance had/need to be readily available on the most favorable terms. This strategy promotes optimal organization and profitability. In 1990, the large Renong group formed a partnership, with UEM, PLUS including all other companies related to the organization fundamental structuring. Renong continues to grow laterally and vertically, becoming the face and benchmark of Corporate Malaysia. By 2001, Renong held major shares in 14 large companies listed on Bursa Malaysia. Among it, Cement Industries of Malaysia and HoHup Construction, Mudajaya Construction.

=== Opus International Consultants ===
1996, Halim Saad valuable acquisition was Opus International Consultants Ltd in New Zealand. OPUS was originally an entity under New Zealand Government, the Ministry of Works and Development. It was privatized and acquired via Halim Saad vehicle Kinta Kellas. Opus covered more than 100 projects in over 20 countries. In 2002 and 2006, Opus was recognized as New Zealand's Trade & Enterprise Service Exporter that year for its work in the international market. Opus was also named New Zealand's Trade Supreme Exporter of the year.

=== Other national projects ===
- Kuala Lumpur International Airport
- National Sports Complex
- Malaysia Singapore Second Link Bridge
- Customs, Immigration and Quarantine Complex (CIQ - Malaysia Singapore)
- Fiber Cable and Submarine Cable 3600 km - Time Dot Com
- Kuala Lumpur Light Rail Transit - PUTRA
- Prolink (Now known as Iskandar Malaysia) - 24,000 acres (9,700 ha)
- Kemaman Bitumen Company
- Cement Industries Malaysia
- Kualiti Alam
- New Straits Times
- Phamarniaga

=== KYS Education Group ===
Halim Saad has always been passionate about education. His pride in terms of educational institutions were Kolej Yayasan Saad (Saad Foundation College) and Kolej Matrikulasi Yayasan Saad (Now known as Kolej Yayasan UEM). It was built in memory of his late father. Both institution famous for producing excellent results in examinations and certifications. Additionally, the KYS school is also known for its wide variety of co-curricular activities such as rugby, netball, triathlon and also orchestra, for example. KYS Orchestra team were required to perform throughout Malaysia including International invitations.

Training and Scholarship programs that Halim Saad mirrored his vision and experiences; RMTS and RGSTF.

=== Markmore Group ===
Markmore group is privately owned company by Halim Saad after the Renong/UEM era.

Sectors involved: 1. Education

2. Construction

3. Property Development

4. Mineral, Oil & Gas

5. Renewable Energy

6. Telecommunication Infra

7. REIT - Shopping Malls

8. Property and Facilities Management Services

9. Financial - Asset Management Services

10. Agriculture & Aquaculture

== Personal life ==
Halim married Noraini Zolkifli on 1979. They had three children. In October 1995, they went to court to confirm the imitation divorce. In 1997, Puan Sri Norani Zolkifli filed a divorce application to Tan Sri Halim Saad, which involves a divorce claim of RM500 million, estimated to be 10% of Tan Sri Halim Saad assets at the time. He has been married to Puan Sri Shaesta Said since 1999 and has three children.

== Honours and awards ==
=== State Order ===
Meritorious service to the country and awarded by the sovereign

- Malaysia
  - Commander of the Order of Loyalty to the Crown of Malaysia (PSM) – Tan Sri (1995)
- Pahang
  - Knight Companion of the Order of Sultan Ahmad Shah of Pahang (DSAP) – Dato' (1990)
  - Grand Knight of the Order of the Crown of Pahang (SIMP) – formerly Dato', now Dato' Indera (1993)
  - Grand Knight of the Order of Sultan Ahmad Shah of Pahang (SSAP) – Dato' Sri (1996)
- Perak
  - Knight Commander of the Order of the Perak State Crown (DPMP) – Dato' (1992)
- Malacca
  - Knight Commander of the Exalted Order of Malacca (DCSM) – Datuk Wira (1993)
- Perlis
  - Knight Grand Commander of the Order of the Crown of Perlis (SPMP) – Dato' Seri (1995)

=== Foreign honours ===
- New Zealand
  - World Class New Zealand Awards - Friend of New Zealand
- Benin
  - Beninese Honorary Consulate
