= Abdul Rozali-Wathooth =

Malaysian cardiothoracic surgeon

Yang Berbahagia Dato' Dr. Abdul Rozali-Wathooth DPCM, KMN, MBBS, FRACS
- Born: 4 October 1949 (age 77); Batu Gajah, Perak, Federation of Malaya
- Citizenship: Malaysian
- Known for: Pioneer of cardiothoracic surgery in Malaysia
- Spouse: Aminah Noor
- Children: 2
- Medical career
- Profession: Cardiothoracic surgeon
- Institutions: Kuala Lumpur Hospital, Institut Jantung Negara, Subang Jaya Medical Centre

Abdul Rozali-Wathooth (born 4 October 1949) is a retired Malaysian cardiothoracic surgeon. He was a founding member of the surgical team that established the first dedicated open-heart surgery program in Malaysia.

He is also known for his involvement in the surgical teams that performed coronary artery bypass surgery on former Prime Minister Mahathir Mohamad in 1989 and 2007.

== Early life and education ==
Rozali was born in Batu Gajah, Perak. He attended King Edward VII School in Taiping Perak, before continuing his secondary education at the Royal Military College in Kuala Lumpur.

After completing his secondary education, he completed a medical degree (MBBS) at Monash University in Melbourne, Australia, in 1974.

He completed his specialist training in Australia, becoming a Fellow of the Royal Australasian College of Surgeons (FRACS) in 1982.

Between 1976 and 1981, his clinical rotations included placements at the Royal Hobart Hospital, Royal Prince Alfred Hospital, and the Royal Alexandra Hospital for Children.

== Career ==
In 1981 Rozali was one of eight healthcare professionals, later referred to in Malaysian medical history as the "Dream Team," sent to Sydney to train in open-heart surgical techniques.

Upon his return, he served as the founding Head of the Department of Cardiothoracic Surgery at Kuala Lumpur Hospital (HKL) from 1982 to 1985.

On 22 October 1982, his team performed the first Coronary Artery Bypass Graft (CABG) surgery in Malaysia, a quintuple bypass on a 39-year-old patient.

In 1985, he transitioned to the private sector, joining the Subang Jaya Medical Centre (then Penawar Hospital) as a consultant cardiothoracic surgeon. He continued to serve at the hospital until his retirement from clinical practice on 1 January 2021.

=== Post-retirement and academic roles ===
Following his clinical retirement, Rozali assumed administrative and academic leadership roles. He has served as the Chairman of IJN Holdings and the Chairman of Institut Jantung Negara (IJN) College.

He was also a member of the Board of Studies for the joint Cardiothoracic Surgery program between Universiti Teknologi MARA (UiTM) and IJN.

== Awards ==
Rozali was conferred the Lifetime Achievement Award by the Malaysian Association for Thoracic and Cardiovascular Surgery (MATCVS) in recognition of his contributions to the field of thoracic and cardiovascular surgery in 2025.

== Honours ==
- Malaysia:
  - Officer of the Order of the Defender of the Realm (KMN) (1983)
- Perak:
  - Knight of the Order of Cura Si Manja Kini (DPCM) – Dato’ (1996)
