= King Edward VII School, Taiping =

King Edward VII School
- Sekolah Menengah Kebangsaan King Edward VII
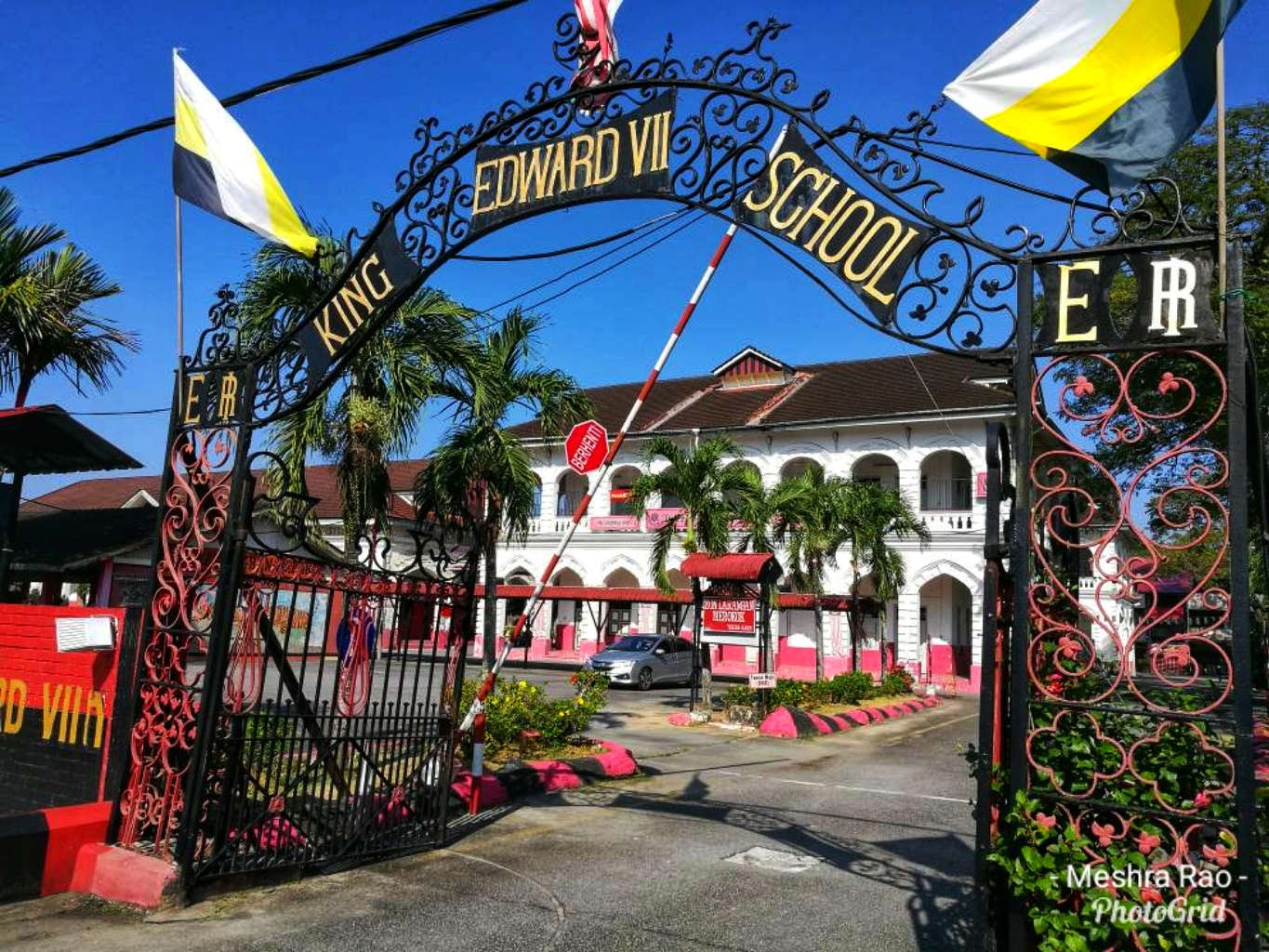

Location
- Jalan Muzium Hulu; Taiping, Perak 34000; Malaysia
- 4.8562167°N 100.7358042°E

Information
- Type: All-boys secondary school
- Motto: Latin: Magni Nominis Umbra (Under the shadow of a Great Name)
- Established: July 1883
- School district: Larut Matang & Selama
- Principal: Mohamad Hazawawi b Yusof
- Staff: 15
- Teaching staff: 83
- Grades: 1–6
- Gender: all-boys
- Age range: 13–17
- Enrollment: 1340 (2012)
- Colours: Red and Black
- Inaugural officiant: H.R.H. Sultan Idris Shah
- Abbreviation: KE7
- Former pupils: Old Edwardians
- Website: smkevii.edu.my

King Edward VII School (Malay: Sekolah Menengah Kebangsaan King Edward VII; abbreviated KE7) is a premier secondary school for boys (and girls, in Sixth Form) located on Jalan Muzium Hulu, in Taiping, Malaysia. Formerly known as Central School, it is one of the oldest schools in Malaysia. The school is widely known as by its initials "KE7". The students are known as Edwardians or Tigers and, as alumni, Old Edwardians.

== History ==
The history of King Edward VII School goes back to the founding of Central School in July 1883. The initial site was the small area of land on which the present Nurses' Hostel stands.

In 1885, a gymnasium was added. In 1899, according to the report of Mr. Greene, the first headmaster, physical drill with music was introduced, and the lads were gradually being initiated into the mysteries of football and cricket.

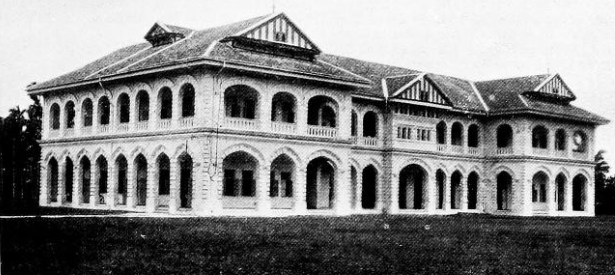
The school c.1900

Roger Francis Stainer, B.A. (London), was the headmaster of Central School, and later of King Edward VII School, from 1900 to 1922. He was a great leader, a fine sportsman, and a capable organiser. The greatest obstacle he had to face was lack of qualified staff. There were no formal training classes in those days, and so he set out to train his own staff. He infused his spirit into a handful of young men around him. Still living today is a handful of the old brigade, seasoned in years, but ever young with fresh memories of the arduous past. Stainer chose "Magni Nominis Umbra" as the school motto.

As the enrollment of students increased, infrastructure became inadequate. A large shed, made of jungle rollers and cheap timber, was built to add capacity to the crowded school. The demand for education was exceeding all expectations; and a new building on a new site was necessary. The site finally selected was the land on which the railway station, probably the first of its kind in Malaya, had stood.

Stainer proposed that the school name be changed from Central School Educational Centre to King Edward VII School, in conjunction with the coronation of King Edward VII, who ascended the English throne in 1901. Red and black, colors of the flag, were selected to be the school colors, red symbolizing courage and pride, black the unity of the whole. King Edward VII School was inaugurated by H.R.H. the Sultan of Perak in 1905, when the number of students enrolled was 434.

In sports, the school performed well in football, cricket, and gymnastics. In 1919, the army cadet force was established, with Stainer as the commanding officer. In 1922, a scout troop—known as the "Second Taiping", under the leadership of D. G. Doral and En. Surjan Singh—was established. In 1923, T. J. Thomas introduced the game of rugby to the school, which, in 1933, emerged as champions among Malay-language schools, beating Penang Free School in the final match.

During World War II, the school was occupied by the Japanese army and was used as the headquarters of the Malayan Kempeitai, and the school sports field became a farm. On 14 January 1946, the students returned to the school under the administration of Captain C. R. Holliday. During that time, the number of students had increased to 1004 students, and the school was housed in four buildings. Lower standards' classes were conducted in the building on Trump Street, elementary classes in Sheffield Hostel on Museum Road and in Old Boys Hostel on Station Road. The middle class was placed in the main building which is near Taiping Rest House.

In 1951, in addition to the existing science laboratories, room for geography, history and arts classes were made available for the students. Form 6 classes were started in 1954, with the school allowing enrollment of female students. In 1958, classes were separated because of the large number of primary and secondary students. Classes of lower forms were divided into two, namely Primary One and Two, which were held in the main building on Station Road, with the Middle Class in block Sheffield, "Former Infant Department", and in the new blocks erected along Brunt Road.

From 1960 onward, Malay-medium classes were introduced. In 1965, students sat for their SPM for the first time.

== Rugby history ==
Introduced in 1923, by T. J. Thomas, a schoolmaster, rugby is a sport as popular as football at the school. The school rugby team became known as the Tigers in 1933, the year they beat Penang Free School in the first inter-school rugby match in the history of Malaya.

Between 1954 and 1961, the Tigers arranged friendly matches with opponents from Johore to Singapore, beating all opponents and becoming champions, earning the title of Kings of Rugby.

In 1978, the school team was selected by Malaysia as a representative to the ASEAN Inter-school rugby tournament in Hatyai, Thailand, gaining third place. After that, the Tigers were winners of the Rugby Silver, District Champion (1979), Taiping Cup Champion (1979), the North Zone Malaysia (1979), and the Inter-School Rugby Tournament (1979), beating Royal Military College by 22–3. The Tigers also won the Silver Cup (1983–1985, 1987–1989 and 1996–1998). During the Royal Selangor Cup match, the Tigers took fourth place at the national level (1987 and 1998).

In 1996, 14 players were chosen for the Perak state team, which defeated Negeri Sembilan for the championship. In 2000, the Tigers were MSSPK champions, finished second in the Perdana Silver Zone competition, and were in the semi-finals in the National Premier Cup.

The Tigers were MSSD LMS champions for 19 years, from 1994 until 2015, and are six-time champions of the Premier Cup.

Among the great school rivals in the sport are Malay College Kuala Kangsar, Royal Military College, Penang Free School, Sekolah Tuanku Abdul Rahman, Hulu Selangor Science School, Selangor Science School, Sekolah Datuk Abdul Razak, English College Johore, and College of Sultan Abdul Hamid.

== Malaysian SMART School ==
The school was awarded SMART School status in 2006. SMART School is one of the seven flagship projects of the Multimedia Super Corridor.

== Northern Corridor Implementation Authority ==
In June 2014, the school was chosen as a key partner by the Northern Corridor Implementation Authority to teach industrial skills to students. The implementation was introduced by the NCIA chief executive officer, Datuk Redza Rafiq Abdul Razak, during the 47th Old Edwardian annual dinner.

== Notable alumni ==
- Ong Hock Thye, former Chief Justice of Malaya
- Lim Swee Aun, former cabinet minister in Malaysia
- Sultan Iskandar Shah, Sultan of Perak (1918–1938)
- Sultan Abdul Aziz, Sultan of Perak (1938–1948)
- Yusof Ishak, first President of Singapore
- Abdul Rahim Ishak, former cabinet minister in Singapore
- Ling Liong Sik, former chairman of the Malaysian Chinese Association (MCA), former Malaysian cabinet minister
- Abdul Mutalib Mohamed Razak, chairman of Media Prima Berhad
- Jins Shamsuddin, actor, politician, former FINAS chairman
- M. Karathu, former Malaysian football team coach and national football player
- Zulkifli Nordin, former MP for Kulim
- Dato' Seri (Dr.) Anwar Fazal World's leading civil society activist. Father of Malaysia's NGO movement
- Chan Sek Keong, former Chief Justice of Singapore
- Devamany S. Krishnasamy, current Perak State Legislative Assembly Speaker
- Joginder Singh, one of Malaya's first doctors
- Uthaya Sankar SB, Malaysian author
- Abdullah Ayub, former chief secretary to the government
- Ghulam-Sarwar Yousof, academic and author
- Jamil Jan, former Proton chairman
- M. Dataya, former national athlete
- Abdul Aziz Ismail, former national cricketer
- Abdul Rahman Yatim, former champion national sharpshooter
- Muhammad Hakimi Ismail, triple jump event athlete and current SEA Games record holder
- R R Chelliah, prominent criminal lawyer
- Abdul Rozali-Wathooth, pioneering cardiothoracic surgeon
