= Bukit Mertajam High School =

Coordinates: 5°21′32.2″N 100°27′39.3″E

Bukit Mertajam High School 大山脚英文中学 Dàshānjiǎo Yīngwén Zhōngxué
- Sekolah Menengah Kebangsaan Tinggi Bukit Mertajam

Location
- 77, Jalan Sri Bukit, 14000 Bukit Mertajam; Penang; Malaysia

Information
- Type: Public secondary school
- Motto: Latin: Aut coepisse noli aut confice (Accomplish or do not begin)
- Established: 18 January 1927; 99 years ago
- Founder: Edgar De La Mothe Stowell
- Principal: Mohd Lazim Bin Sabir
- Grades: Form 1 - Form 6
- Gender: Co-educational
- Campus: Large School campus, at the city center
- Colours: Red, white and black
- Affiliations: Malaysia Ministry Of Education
- Website: www.hsbm.edu.my

Bukit Mertajam National High School (Malay: Sekolah Menengah Kebangsaan Tinggi Bukit Mertajam), commonly known as High School Bukit Mertajam (HSBM), is a public secondary school located in Bukit Mertajam, Penang, Malaysia.

== Name ==
The name the school has changed several times, from the Government English School Bukit Mertajam in early years, to Bukit Mertajam High School, and finally to High School Bukit Mertajam. The School, however is most commonly called "High School" by local people.

In Malay, BM High School is named Sekolah Menengah Tinggi Bukit Mertajam

In Mandarin, High School Bukit Mertajam is called Da Shan Jiao Ying Wen Zhong Xue, which translates to "Bukit Mertajam English Secondary School".

== History ==
=== Early years ===
Bukit Mertajam High School was the first government school in Province Wellesley. The school officially opened on January 18, 1927 with an enrollment of roughly 300 students. During the 1920s, students crossed the channel twice daily in order to attend school at Penang island to study beyond Standard 5. Among the schools in the island at that time were the Penang Free School and St. Xavier's Institution.

Harold Ambrose Robinson Cheeseman — then Inspector of Schools Penang, later Director of Education in Malaya— was very outset, Mr. Stowell sought to create a replica of the Sedbergh English Public School, which he had attended and which is known for its stringent discipline.

Cheeseman wrote the following on the occasion of the school's 21st anniversary:

I was almost heart-broken. The High School is an exact replica of the elementary school building of Rangoon Road in Singapore. I protested in vain...

The pioneer staff included the following people:

	Mr. E. la M. Stowell (Headmaster)
Mr. Chan Ewe Pin	Mr. Cheah Chong Chee	Mr. Cheong Hong Oon
Mr. Chin Yoon Ngean	Ms. A. Cornelius	Mr. Gan Hock Hye
Mr. Kam Kee Hock	Mr. Khor Kok Seng	Mr. Ng Cheong Weng
Mr. S. Subbiah	Mr. Tan Hock Sian	Mr. Tan Kok Kee
	Mr. S.M. Rouse

Peons: Pa Hussein, Darus and Che Rose

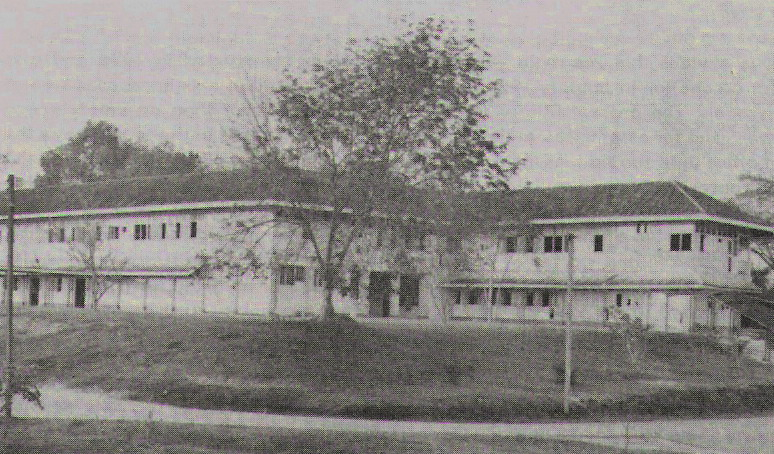
The Wooden Block (1929), which still stands on the little Shantii

The main wooden block was constructed in 1926, directly facing the Bukit Mertajam Hill that stands sentinel over Bukit Mertajam. The school hall came into being in 1929.

Cutting and leveling out the slope in front of the school for a playing field went on for several years until Mr. C.E.H. Jacobs came into office in 1931. He persuaded the Public Works Department to plant capalogium over the surface, cut the creepers when they had grown to two or three feet high, and plough them back into the clay. The field was then left for months for the vegetation to rot and help break up as well as fertilize the soil. The operation took about a year, and now the ground was ready for grass to be planted. The field was titled "Jacob's Green" after C.E.H. Jacobs's particular care in the state of the field. Jacobs's Green Society came into being two years later with the object of improving and beautifying not only the field but also the grounds in general.

=== Second World War ===
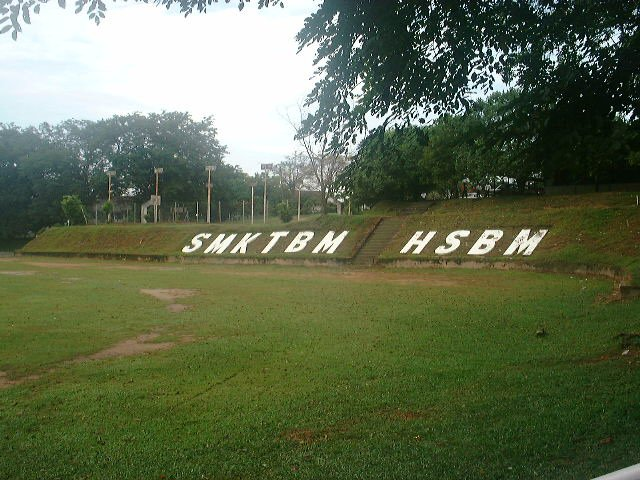
Jacobs's Green

The following was written in captivity in Changi Prison, May 1942, by J.E. Tod, headmaster from 1947 to 1950:

Towards the end of 1941, the school was occupied by the Australian Army and the school was removed to the rice mill behind the Bukit Mertajam District Hospital. By December 13, the Japanese were bombing Penang. Every day the students could see ten or twenty Japanese Zero Japanese Zero plane flying over Bukit Mertajam on their mission to bomb Penang Island.

One bomb fell on the Bukit Mertajam railway station, causing an explosion. The students immediately went under their desk for cover. After half an hour, Rev. Colin King held an assembly and told the boys that the school was going to have a long holiday. The boys were very happy, not knowing that the holiday would last for more than three years and many of their class and school mates would be killed in World War II. In September 1945 the Japanese surrendered, the high school re-opened and registered the boys who wished to study again. Mr. Cheong Hong Oon was the acting Headmaster before Mr. D.K. Swan arrived in 1946, and he wrote the following of the events post-war:

All the boys who were keen to pick up the broken threads of their education again were enrolled, irrespective of their age. The High School spirit had revived and the school flourished again...

=== After the war ===
On May 28, 1951, Penang Harbour Board presented Bukit Mertajam High School the School Bell. It was first rung by the Honourable, The Resident Commissioner, Mr. A. Caston who officially opened the Science Block.

On May 15, 1952, His Excellency the High Commissioner to Malaya, Sir Gerald Temper, visited High School accompanied by Mr. Aitken, the District Officer. The headmaster, Mr. F.H. Jones took him around the school.

In 1988, the school tradition was broken when girls were admitted into 4th Form (Senior 4) and later into other forms. The pupils in 4th Form were selected from various schools based on their results in the SRP ("Sijil Rendah Pelajaran"), an evolved version of Lower Certificate of Education, a Senior 3 public examination. However this new tradition breakout was not entirely new. The school had already accepted female students in smaller numbers into Sixth Forms at earlier dates.

Bukit Mertajam High School celebrated its Golden Jubilee in 1987.

On August 31, 1986, a tragedy occurred when the upper floor of Block B caught fire. The school library and four classrooms were burnt down. Old school magazines, reference books and other main documents were destroyed.

In 1992 Bukit Mertajam High School was awarded The Penang State Level Sekolah Harapan Negara. In 1997, High School emerged as one of the earliest school in the country to make it compulsory for students to wear ties and for Muslim Students to wear Baju Melayu. As a Premier School (Sekolah Perdana), Bukit Mertajam High School was a pioneer school in providing Information Technology subject for both the MGCE and MHCE.

Bukit Mertajam High School is also very reputable for its extra-curricular achievements. Some of the remarkable achievements are in Soccers, Rugby, Taekwondo (WTF) etc.

=== Year 2009 and beyond ===
Recently, the High School was awarded Premier School status by the Education board. This caused the traditionally racial diverse school to become almost Bumiputera as it became an elite school for the Malays.

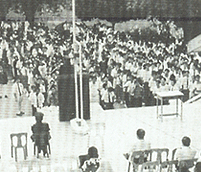
School Assembly

== Notable alumnis ==
- Abdullah Ahmad Badawi, 5th Prime Minister of Malaysia
- Anwar Ibrahim, 10th Prime Minister of Malaysia
- Mohamed Salleh Ismael, 1st Inspector General of Police of Singapore and Malaya
- Chin Fung Kee, Acting Vice Chancellor of University Malaya (UM)
- Ishak Thamby Chik, Vice Chancellor of Universiti Sains Malaysia (USM)
- Lamin Mohd Yunus, President of the Court of Appeal of Malaysia
- Ibrahim Saad, Minister of Malaysian Transport
- Steven Sim, Minister of Human Resources (Malaysia)
- Mohd Shariff Omar, Deputy Minister of Agriculture
- Ahmad Kamil Jaffar, Secretary General of the Ministry of Malaysian Foreign Affairs
- Jegathesan, Secretary General of the Ministry of Housing and Local Government (Malaysia)
- L. Krishnan, Pioneer of Malaysian Film Industry
- Goh Hock Guan, Architect & Town Planner behind Subang Jaya township & restructuring town planning in Vietnam
- Mohd Radzi Mansor, Chairman of Telekom (M) Berhad
- Mohan Jiwa, field hockey player
