= SM Sultan Abdul Halim =

Coordinates: 3°19′21.00″N 101°16′27.96″E

Location
- Jitra; Kedah, 06009; Malaysia

Information
- Type: Public Mixed-gender education, boarding school Sekolah Berasrama Penuh
- Motto: Belajar Dan Berbakti ("Study And Serve")
- Established: 7 May 1963
- School district: Jitra
- School code: KEA4036
- Principal: Zuraisham bin Che Azmi
- Grades: Form 1 - Form 5
- Enrollment: 615
- Classes: (Lower and Upper form) Arif, Bestari, Cerdas, Dinamik, Elit
- Language: Malay, English
- Houses: Andeka, Cendekia, Wira, Sateria, Pendeta, Juara
- Yearbook: Mahawangsa
- Website: www.smsah.edu.my

Sekolah Menengah Sultan Abdul Halim (English: Sultan Abdul Halim Secondary School; abbreviated SMSAH) is a premier boarding school, located in Jitra, Kubang Pasu, Kedah.Established in 1963 under Razak Report, it is the first boarding school in Kedah. The school is nicknamed as Jenan. In 2010, the school was awarded with the Sekolah Berprestasi Tinggi or High Performance School title, a title awarded to the 20 schools in Malaysia that have met stringent criteria including academic achievement, strength of alumni, international recognition, network and linkages. The school is specialised in rugby and wind orchestra. The school obtained first place among all schools in Kedah in the recent Sijil Pelajaran Malaysia 2016 with 25 students obtaining straight A's.

== History ==
Establishment of Sekolah Menengah Sultan Abdul Halim line to meet the development needs in the field of Malay-medium education in Malaysia after independence.

In 1958, a Malay-medium secondary degrees has been opened in Sultan Abdul Hamid College, Alor Setar with enrolment of 31 people. The number of students has increased to 791 people in 1963. At this stage, there was a need to establish a specific school to accommodate Malay stream students. Razak Report was produced in 1956 and recommended the establishment of the school as among pilot school in Malay-medium education.

Flow of students studying at the Sultan Abdul Hamid College, Alor Setar were absorbed into Sekolah Menengah Sultan Abdul Halim (SMSAH). They moved into its own building located in Jenan, Jitra on 7 May 1963. Complex area of over 51 acres has 27 classrooms, a large hall, a gymnasium and a cafeteria. 2 classrooms temporary dormitory. In 1964, three dormitory buildings and a mosque was built. The opening ceremony was officiated by His Majesty the Sultan Abdul Halim Muadzam Shah, the Sultan of Kedah Darul Aman on 8 April 1965.

In 1975, Matriculation classes started. The school is celebrating its Golden Jubilee in 2013.

== Students life ==
SMSAH Band is among the most influential orchestra band in SBP. As the school is specialised in wind orchestra, the band have an excellent achievement in Finale Wind Orchestra. The band gained first runner up in 2003, crowned champion in 2004 and second runner-up in 2009.

== Notable alumni ==
The school alumni body is Persatuan Bekas Pelajar SMSAH.

- Shahidan Kassim – former minister in the Prime Minister's Department, 6th Menteri Besar of Perlis.
- Othman Abdul – prominent Malaysian corporate and political figure, former Majlis Amanah Rakyat (MARA) chairman
- Yusof Yacob – deputy chairman of Zecon Berhad, former Dewan Rakyat deputy speaker, former chairman of Bank Rakyat

Abdul Rahman Hashim, a recipient of Order of Australia medal was formerly a teacher here. He then migrated to Australia in 1969, being well known Muslim statesman there.
