= SMS Selangor =

- SMSS
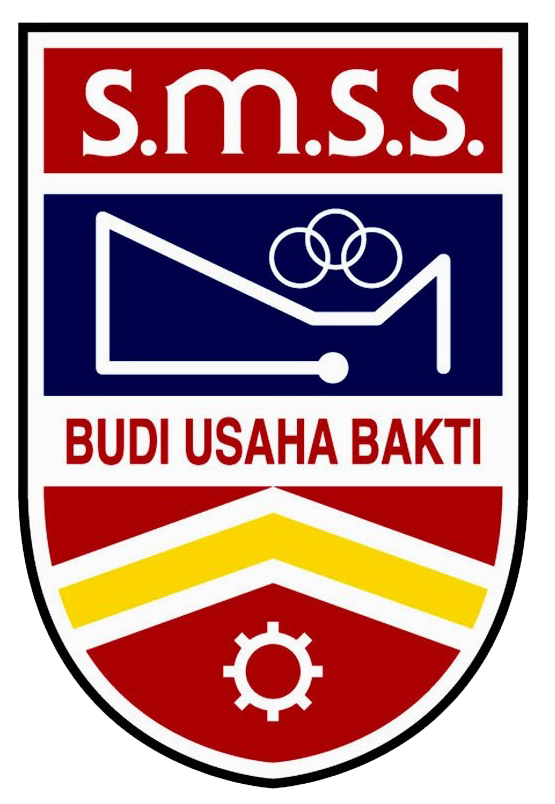

Location
- Jalan Yaacob Latif, 56000 Bandar Tun Razak; Kuala Lumpur; Malaysia

Information
- Type: Public, Secondary school, Boarding school, Sekolah Berasrama Penuh, Mixed-gender education
- Motto: Budi Usaha Bakti (Righteous, Efforts, Service)
- Established: 1 January 1973
- Principal: Puan Hajah Kamsiah
- Grades: Form 1 - Form 5
- Enrollment: 600
- Classes: Budi, Usaha, Jaya, Maju,
- Language: Malay, English
- Houses: Perwira; Pahlawan; Panglima; Pendekar
- Colours: Red, Blue and Yellow
- Yearbook: Budi
- Affiliations: Sekolah Berasrama Penuh, Ministry of Education (Malaysia)
- Alumni: Persatuan Alumni Sekolah Menengah Sains Selangor
- Website: www.smss.edu.my

Sekolah Menengah Sains Selangor (English: Selangor Science Secondary School; abbreviated SMSS) is one of three fully residential schools (Sekolah Berasrama Penuh) in Kuala Lumpur, Malaysia. Established in 1973 under the Second Malaysia Plan to comply with Malaysian New Economic Policy, the school is located about a small hill in Bandar Tun Razak, overlooking the scenic Permaisuri Lake. In 2011, the school was awarded the Sekolah Berprestasi Tinggi or High Performance School title, awarded to schools in Malaysia that have met stringent criteria including academic achievement, strength of alumni, international recognition, network, and linkages. In the year 2013, the school managed to produce 84 straight A's students out of 120 with GPS 1.06 to be the best schools in Kuala Lumpur. The school continue to strive and produce great results in the public examination in the following years.

The school is also a Malaysia Airlines adopted school.

== History ==
Sekolah Menengah Sains Selangor is actually located within the boundaries of the Federal Territory of Kuala Lumpur, despite what its name suggests. It is one of the earlier science schools in the country, hence its name bearing or representing the State of Selangor, prior to the formation of the Federal Territory of Kuala Lumpur (for hitherto it was simultaneously the national capital which served as a district under Selangor state jurisdiction as well as being the capital of undivided Selangor state).

SMSS is a co-ed school, with students from all states in Malaysia (not only catering those from the Peninsular especially the Klang Valley/Greater Kuala Lumpur area). The school enrollment was focused mainly on excellent students from rural areas and economically disadvantaged backgrounds. The pioneer batch of students which were made up of Form 1 and 4 started in 1973 temporarily placed for a year at three other different schools such as Sek. Men. Sultan Abdul Aziz, Kajang, Klang High School and Kajang High School for the first formers. Meanwhile, the form four students were temporarily placed in both Sekolah Sultan Alam Shah and King Edward VII School, Taiping. They were reunited at the new school in 1974 as Form 2 and 5 students. Later intakes were mostly from Form 1 based on their UPSR excellence, with a trickle coming in at Form 4 based on their PMR results.

In 1986, the school were chosen as one of 20 pilot school for Computer Literacy Pilot Project and received BBC Master 128.

After more than 34 years of establishment, fellow rivals like Sekolah Menengah Sains Tengku Muhammad Faris Petra and Sekolah Menengah Sains Raja Tun Azlan Shah. The school was selected to be one of the off-site team challenge venues for MasterChef Malaysia season 2.

In 2013, in conjunction with the school 40 years celebration, the school were honoured to host the Fully Residential School Excellence Day, while the school also hosted FRSIS (Fully Residential Schools International Symposium) in 2016.

== Location ==
Situated strategically on top of a small hill in Bandar Tun Razak, Kuala Lumpur. Its main arch is directly opposite of the Kuala Lumpur Football Stadium, which is in turn adjacent to the Kuala Lumpur Sports Complex and Kuala Lumpur Swimming Complex. It also has a cordial relations with other schools, such as Sekolah Menengah Sains Alam Shah or ASIS, which have replaced the old site of Sekolah Sultan Alam Shah in 2003, Sekolah Menengah Teknik Kuala Lumpur being the oldest technical school in Malaysia that was founded in 1926, Sekolah Menengah Kebangsaan Seri Permaisuri and Sekolah Menengah Kebangsaan Cheras as its immediate neighbours. Pusat Perubatan Universiti Kebangsaan Malaysia is also conveniently in the vicinity.

There have been discussion to move the school when Kuala Lumpur were partioned from Selangor. In 1990, Muhammad Muhammad Taib, Menteri Besar of Selangor have proposed to move the school to Hulu Selangor. However, this did not materialized.

== List of Principals ==
1973 – 1975 - M.P. Prabhakar

1976 – 1982 - Ibrahim bin Yahaya

1982 – 1984 - Shuib bin Dahaban

1984 – 1987 - Zakaria bin Puteh

1987 – 1990 - Tn. Hj. Abdul Raof bin Hussin

1990 – 1993 - Tn. Hj. Masram bin Hj. Mohd Som

1994 – 1997 - Tn. Hj. Mohd Zubir bin Hj. Mohd Mustafa

1997 – 2000 - Mohd Baharin bin Harun

2000 – 2002 - Amran bin Maskor

2003 – 2004 - Tn. Hj. Mohd Radzi bin Abd Jabar (AMP)

2004 – 2009 - Tn. Hj. Mohd Ardani bin Yunos

2009 – 2014 - Tn. Hj. Nor Paizin bin Ibrahim

2014 – 2016 - Tn. Hj. Juahir bin Mondakir

2016 – 2021 - Rosnah binti Osman (DSM)

2021 – 2023 - En Zulkipli bin Abd Latib

2023 – now - Pn. Hjh. Kamsiah binti Yasin

== Students Life ==
This school has a rugby program. After 40 years of establishment, the school has won more than 100 national championships, including 43 times state's champion, 4 times Fully Residential School Rugby 10's and 5 times being crowned as ANSARA Tens Rugby Championship. The school alumnus is known as SMS Old Boys while the rugby alumnus team is SMS Old Boys Rugby Club. "From Boys to Gentleman", the book which traces back the school's rugby achievements for 40 years, were launched by Ian Fleming Gordon, the school own "Father and Grandfather of Rugby". The school is also notable with being part of Malaysian Super Six Schools Rugby, which is a yearly rugby union a league that is held in purpose to crown the best school rugby team in Malaysia. The league were invitational, with all the six schools (SMSS, SAS, STAR's Cobratasha, SDAR's Lions, MCKK's All Blacks and SEMASHUR's Zealord) had astonishing records in various school rugby competitions.

The school is active in other sports too such as hockey and basketball. It has a high-performance wind orchestra team entitled The Renaissance that competes in the national SBP Wind Orchestra competitions. In 2006, The Renaissance was awarded the Bronze Award during the 2006 SBP Wind Orchestra Competition. As time passed by, the achievement had improved until it got 2nd place in Finale Wind Orchestra 2010 and finally, in 2012, being crowned as national champion. In 2011, the school band have been featured in a flashmob style, reality programme, Refleksi Orkestra in conjunction with Orkestra RTM 50 Golden Jubilee.

== Notable alumni ==
- Ahmad Izham Omar - Film producer, music composer and music producer
- Mierul Aiman - Actor
