= Kolej Yayasan Saad =

College in Ayer Keroh, Malacca, Malaysia

Coordinates: 2.2989917°N 102.3181336°E

- Ayer Keroh, Malacca; Malaysia

Information
- Type: Private boarding school
- Motto: Centre Of Excellence
- Established: June 25, 1995; 31 years ago
- Founder: Tan Sri Wira Halim Saad
- School district: Ayer Keroh
- Principal: Tan Cheh Li
- Forms: 1-5
- Gender: Male and female
- Age range: 13-17
- Enrollment: -
- Classes: Amanah, Rajin, Taat, Ikhlas, Jujur, Gigih, Cekal* *For Upper Forms
- Language: Malay, English, French, Mandarin
- Houses: Rahman Razak Hussein
- Affiliations: Halim Saad, Ministry of Education (Malaysia)
- Website: Official website

Kolej Yayasan Saad (KYS), (translated as Saad Foundation College), was established by Tan Sri Halim Saad as a private, entirely residential institution in 1995. The school is located in Ayer Keroh, Malacca. In both the Pentaksiran Tingkatan 3 (PT3) and Sijil Pelajaran Malaysia (SPM) exams, the school is popularly known for achieving outstanding outcomes. Additionally, the school is also known for its wide variety of co-curricular activities such as rugby, netball, swimming,

== Alumni ==
- Mohd Ridhwan Mohd Ali - MLA of Ayer Molek
