= Sekolah Dato' Abdul Razak =

- Dato' Abdul Razak School
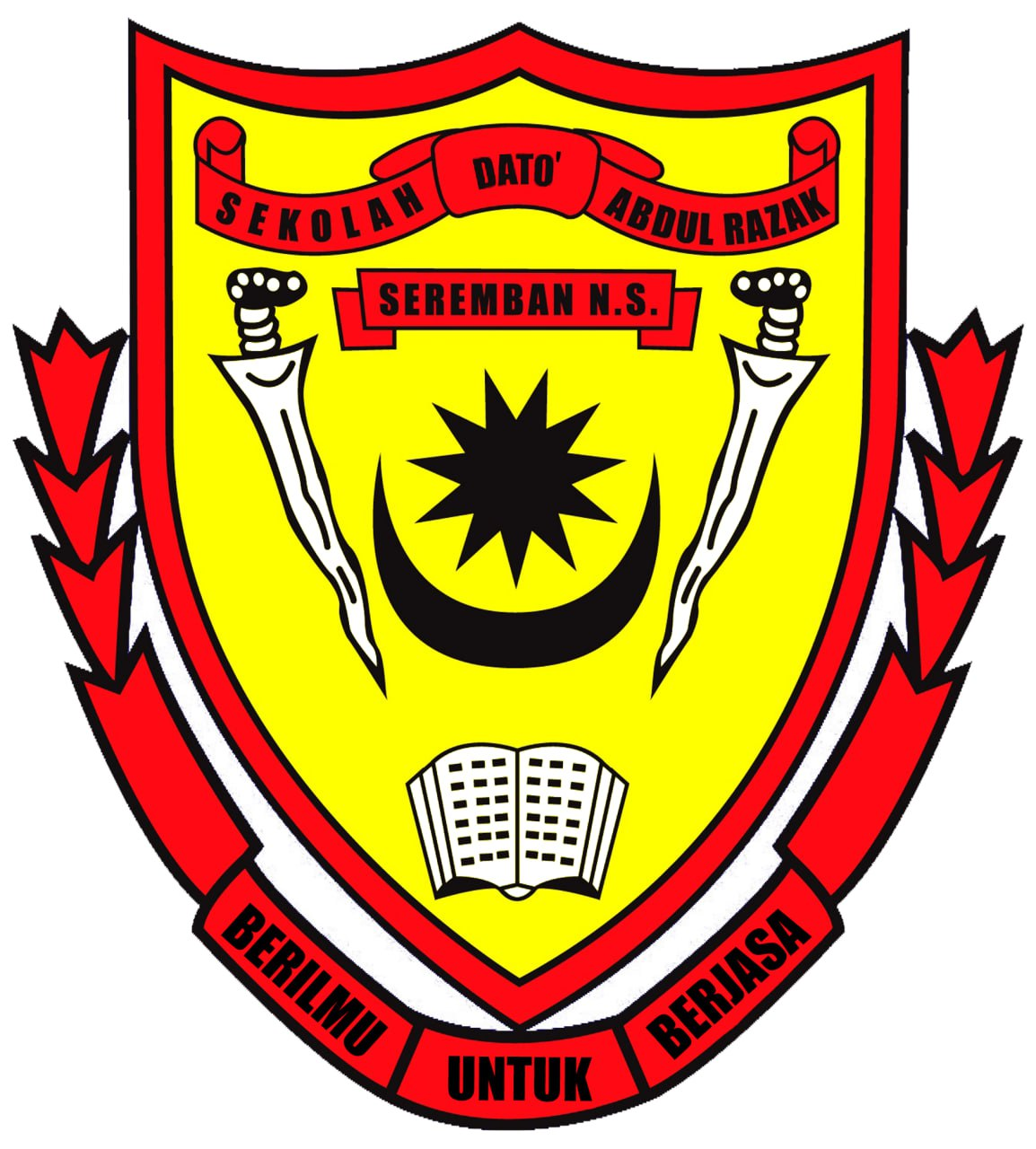

Location
- Sungai Gadut; Seremban, Negeri Sembilan Darul Khusus, 71450; Malaysia

Information
- Other name: SDAR
- Type: Sekolah Berasrama Penuh
- Motto: Malay: Berilmu Untuk Berjasa (To Learn and To Serve)
- Established: 1st May 1956
- Authority: Bahagian Pengurusan Sekolah Berasrama Penuh, Ministry of Education, Malaysia
- School code: NEB4137
- Principal: Md Nazri bin Hassan
- Teaching staff: 63 (2026)
- Grades: Form 1 - Form 5
- Gender: Boys
- Age range: 13 - 17 years old
- Enrolment: 734 students (2026)
- Language: Malay, English, French, Japanse, Chinese, Arabic
- Houses: Bendahara (Yellow); Laksamana (Green); Syahbandar (Blue); Temenggung (Red)
- Colours: Red, Yellow, White
- Song: Berilmu Untuk Berjasa
- Yearbook: SEDAR
- Alumni name: SDAR Alumni (SDARA)
- Website: www.sdar.edu.my

Sekolah Dato' Abdul Razak (English: Dato' Abdul Razak School; abbreviated SDAR) is a premiere, Sekolah Berasrama Penuh (English: Fully Residential School) for male students in Seremban, Negeri Sembilan, Malaysia. It is one of the most prestigious schools in Malaysia, selecting the best students in the country and is named after Abdul Razak Hussein.

It was known as a Smart School, before becoming a Cluster School in 2008. In 2010, SDAR was selected as one of the 20 Sekolah Berprestasi Tinggi or High Performance schools in Malaysia. SDAR is also part of 'School of Global Excellence', SGE, a special school project set by the Ministry of Education. In 2025, the school has been given "Apple Distinguished School" designation. The school is known for its rugby and foyer program.

== History ==
=== Establishment ===
SDAR was established in Johor Bahru on 1 May 1956 as Sekolah Menengah Melayu (Malay Secondary School). The establishment of the school was based on the proposal from the 'Penyata Razak' (Razak Report) 1956. Among the main objectives of the formation of the school was to provide opportunities for bright and high potential students from the Malay stream primary school to further their education to the secondary level.

When Sekolah Menengah Melayu was first established, there was no dedicated campus for the students. The first batch of students consisted of 80 boys and they were accompanied by three teachers. The group was assigned to a temporary location in Bukit Zaharah, Johor Bahru. In 1957, half of the original first batch students were assigned to enroll in a new location (now known as Sekolah Tuanku Abdul Rahman) in Ipoh.

The remaining students were then relocated to Tanjung Malim, Perak, staying in the campus provided by the Sultan Idris Training College, SITC (currently known as Universiti Pendidikan Sultan Idris). With larger campus, more students were taken in and enrolment increased to 119. SITC Principal, R.A. Goodchild was appointed as the temporary principal of the new school and he was replaced by C.F. Daniels two months later. Within this period, the school teaching faculty increased to 11, including part-time teachers.

On 5 January 1958, the school new campus building, located next to SITC, was opened and En. Ariffin Mohd Nam was appointed as the first school principal.

=== School renaming ===
On 29 November 1958, the school was given a new name. The then Minister of Education, Mohamed Khir Johari, officially announced the school's new name as Sekolah Dato’ Abdul Razak, in honour of Dato’ Abdul Razak Hussein, who was the brainchild behind the school formation. Dato’ Abdul Razak himself, who was the Deputy Prime Minister at the time, officiated the renaming ceremony. “Berilmu Untuk Berjasa”, which means "With Knowledge to Contribute", became the official school motto.

=== Jalan Sikamat campus ===
As the school enrolment grew, the Tanjung Malim campus could no longer accommodate the increasing number of students. As such, in 1971, the Negeri Sembilan state government had allocated 16.36 acres of land in Jalan Sikamat, Seremban, as the new school campus site. On the 2nd of January 1972, SDAR officially relocated to its new site in Seremban despite the unfinished constructions of some of its facilities (dining hall building and some classrooms). The Removal Class students had to be temporarily assigned to the nearby teachers' training college campus (now known as Insititut Pendidikan Guru Raja Melewar). Tuan Syed Jaafar Al-Idrus, maintained his post as the school principal during this time.

On 3 November 1973, the Jalan Sikamat SDAR campus was officially opened in a ceremony attended by Dato' Haji Murad bin Noor, Director General of Education and En Annuar Ayeob, the Negeri Sembilan Education Director.

SDAR occupied the Jalan Sikamat campus for 3 decades until the Ministry of Education built a brand new campus for the school in Sungai Gadut, Seremban. SDAR completed its final academic year in Jalan Sikamat in 2001 before moving to the new campus in 2002. The Jalan Sikamat campus was then renovated and became the site for a new SBP, Sekolah Menengah Sains Seremban (now known as Sekolah Menengah Sains Tuanku Munawir or SASER).

=== Sungai Gadut campus ===
On the 2nd of January 2002, SDAR commenced its school session at a new location in Sungai Gadut, Senawang, Seremban. The 40-acre campus consisted of an administration building, 25 classrooms, four hostel buildings, mosque, dining hall, and accommodation complex for academic and non-academic staffs. The campus is also equipped with a sport field, tennis court, and a basketball court

== Extracurricular activities ==
=== Rugby ===
At the heart of SDAR's co-curricular identity is rugby, a sport the school has dominated at both state and national level for over five decades. The SDAR Lions, established since 1971, are well known for actively producing international-level players every year and frequently competing in national and international tournaments. A number of players have gone on to represent the Malaysia national rugby union team, a testament to the elite standard of training and competition at the school.

SDAR Lions claimed the National Premier Schools Rugby Championship in 1998 and featured prominently in the finals of both the 1999, 2001 and many more editions. Their dominance is not confined to a single era — prior to the school's relocation to Seremban, the team won the Perak state title and the MORI Cup in 1971. SDAR also won the Negeri Sembilan school rugby championship, making it the only school in Malaysia to have claimed state titles in two different states.

Among the Lions' most celebrated achievements is their record in the MSSM U15 National School Rugby Championship. SDAR have lifted the trophy five times, in 1990, 2009, 2011, 2012, and 2013, placing them among the most decorated schools in the competition's entire history. Particularly remarkable was their dominance between 2011 and 2013, where the Lions claimed three consecutive national titles — a feat that cemented SDAR's position as the benchmark for school rugby development in Malaysia. This national pedigree is further complemented by the school holding the most championship titles in Negeri Sembilan at both the U15 and U18 levels, a record no other school in the state has matched. SDAR Lions is a consistent contender in Super Schools Rugby Championship, where they are a force to be reckoned with.

SDAR Lions' reputation extends beyond domestic competition. Since 1973, SDAR has maintained an annual rugby fixture against King's College Thailand until today, one of the longest-running school rugby traditions in Southeast Asia, underscoring the school's standing as an institution of international sporting prestige. SDAR has also been hosting its own invitational SDAR 10's tournament every year since 2009, further cementing its role as the premier hub for school rugby in Malaysia.

=== Basketball ===
SDAR's basketball programme, competing under the banner of the Redwings, has established itself as one of the most formidable school basketball outfits in Malaysia. Widely regarded as the King of the South, the Redwings have claimed the Southern Zone Sekolah Berasrama Penuh (SBP) Basketball Championship on consistent occasions, a dominance built on the unique advantages of a fully residential school environment — allowing players to train together extensively without the constraints of time, venue, or logistics.

Their zonal supremacy has translated to the national stage, with the Redwings claiming the national SBP Basketball Championship — the pinnacle of inter-boarding-school basketball competition in the country. SDAR Redwings have also competed in open external competitions, most notably dominating the NCBL U18 Division upon their debut participation, further affirming the depth and quality of SDAR's basketball development programme. SDAR Redwings is regarded as one of fierce competitors in Negeri Sembilan's basketball scene though represented by all-Malays boys, with multiple players have gone to represent on national and international levels.

=== Football ===
SDAR's football programme, competing under the name SDAR Alpha, has emerged as one of the most successful and consistently decorated football outfits in the SBP school football landscape. Alpha recently clinched the National SBP Football Championship, the highest honour in Malaysian school boarding football, underlining the programme's status as a genuine force at the national level.

Beyond national competition, SDAR Alpha has accumulated multiple titles in the Southern Premier Championship, a fiercely contested regional tournament that draws the strongest school sides from the southern states of Peninsular Malaysia. SDAR Alpha has also established serial dominance in the MSSD Seremban 2 — the district-level competition that serves as the foundation of their player development pipeline — producing a steady stream of talented footballers who have gone on to represent the school with distinction at higher levels.

The combination of national titles, regional supremacy, and consistent district success makes SDAR Alpha one of the most well-rounded and storied school football programmes in the entire SBP system.

=== Performing arts ===
SDAR's co-curricular excellence is not limited to the sports field. The school's performing arts programme has earned national recognition, with the school band achieving a rare level of prominence for a secondary institution. SDAR Wind Orchestra is one of the best programme in SBP. Having consistently making into National Finals, and scoring Gold Awards. In 2011, the band was selected to participate in Refleksi Orkestra, a nationally televised programme produced in conjunction with the RTM Orchestra's 50th Golden Jubilee celebration. The performance, presented in a flash mob format, showcased the musicianship, creativity, and collective discipline that define the SDAR co-curricular tradition.

== Notable alumni ==
=== Politicians ===
- Dato' Seri Ahmad Husni Mohamad Hanadzlah, former Second Minister of Finance
- Dato' Sri Ahmad Shabery Cheek, former Minister of Agriculture and Agro-based Industry
- Datuk Dr. Haji Abdul Latif Ahmad, former Minister in the Prime Minister's Department
- Dato' Wan Hisham Wan Salleh, former member of Terengganu State Executive Council
- Dato' Haji Adnan Abu Hassan, current Member of Parliament (MP) for Kuala Pilah

=== Academics ===
- Emeritus Professor Dato' Dr. Mohd Sham Mohd Sani, former vice chancellor of Universiti Kebangsaan Malaysia
- Tan Sri Dato' Dr. Nik Mustapha Raja Abdullah, former vice chancellor of Universiti Putra Malaysia
- Dato' Dr. Mohd Fauzi Ramlan, former vice chancellor of Universiti Putra Malaysia

=== Law ===
- Tan Sri Ahmad Maarop, jurist and lawyer, 10th president of the Court of Appeal of Malaysia
- Dato' Sri Abdul Halim Aman, current and seventh chief commissioner of the Malaysian Anti-Corruption Commission
