= Vajiravudh College =

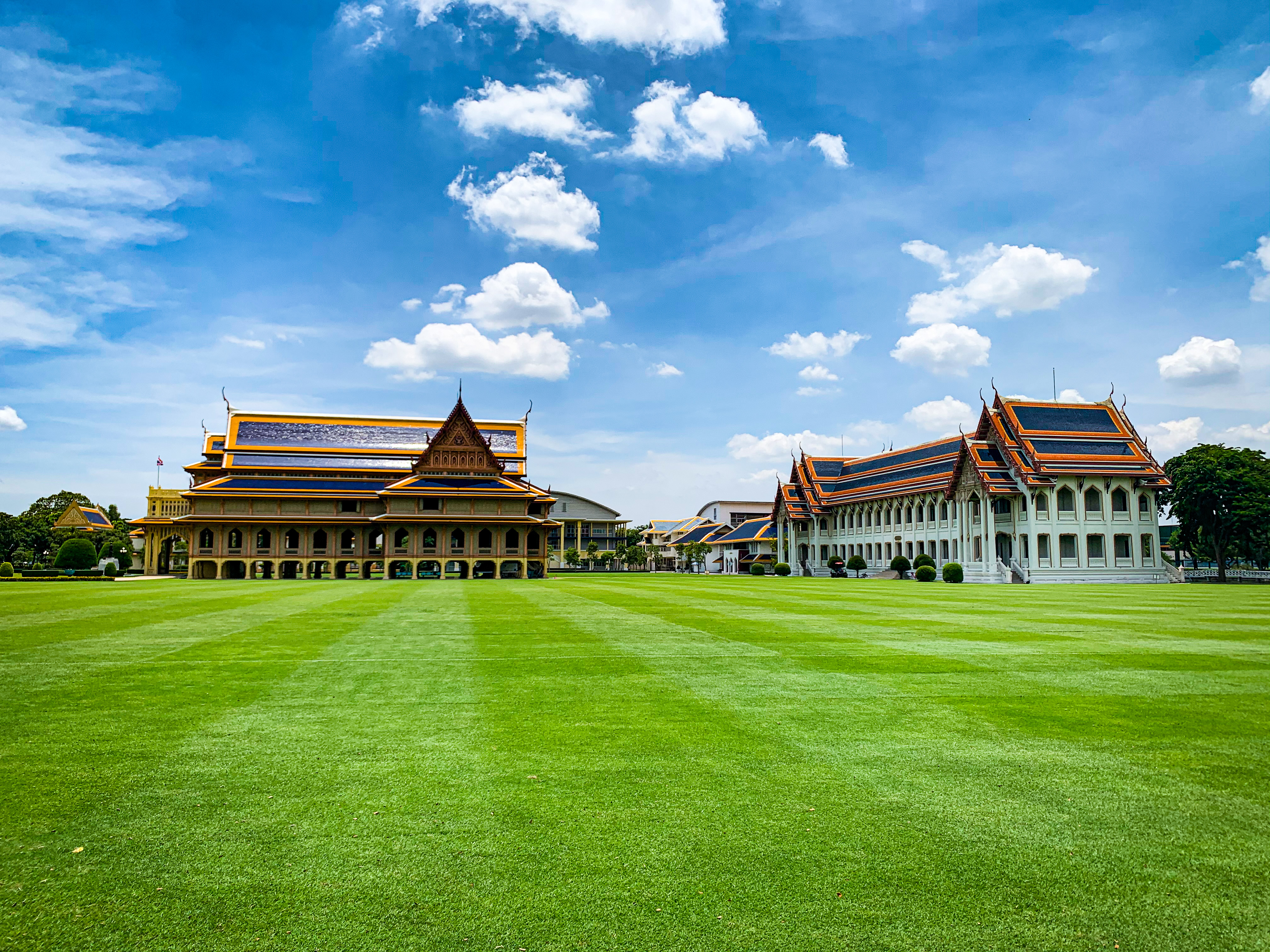

Location
- 197 Rajvithi Road; Dusit, Bangkok, 10300; Thailand
- Coordinates: 13°46′34″N 100°31′03″E

Information
- Type: Private School
- Established: 1910
- Founder: Vajiravudh
- Headmaster: Kiattikhun Chartprasert
- Gender: Boys
- Age: 9–10 to 18
- Enrollment: ~800
- Houses: 9
- Colour
- Former pupils: Old vajiravudhian
- Website: www.vajiravudh.ac.th

Vajiravudh College (Thai: วชิราวุธวิทยาลัย) is a private, all-boys boarding school in Dusit District, Bangkok, Thailand. The school was established by King Rama VI, also known as King Vajiravudh.

The school was originally named the Royal Pages College (Thai: มหาดเล็กหลวง) before students from the King's College were transferred to the Royal Pages College and it was renamed Vajiravudh College.

Students are accommodated in residential houses (kana, Thai: คณะ). Primary students are assigned to three houses: Sanamchan, Nandhauthayan, and Saranrom. Secondary students are divided into six houses: School House, Dusit House, Chitlada House, Phyathai House, Chongruk-Bhakdi House, and Saksri-Mongkol House. The school encourages students to balance academics with sports, music, and the arts.

Students typically enter in Prathom 4 (Year 5) and remain until Mathayom 6 (Year 13).

== Royal Policy ==
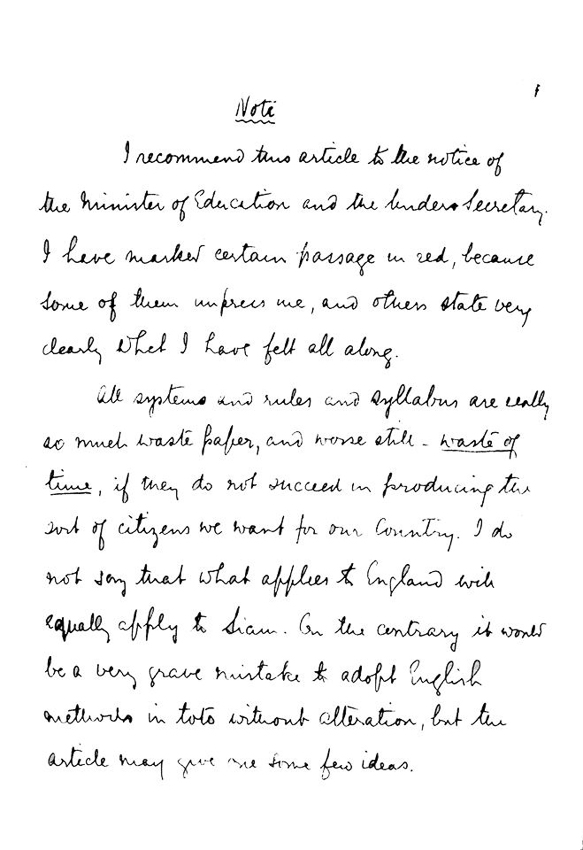
King Vajiravudh's Royal Policy 1

The royal policy of His Majesty King Rama VI, the founder, was

"In the Royal Pages Colleges, what I want is not so much to turn out model boys, all of the same Standard, all brilliant “Madhayom” Scholars with thousands of marks each, as to turn out efficient young men, young men who will be physically and morally clean, and who will be looking forward keenly to take up whatever burden the future may lay upon them. I do not want a monument of learning who have passed all your exams with flying colours. I do not want a walking school book. What I want are just manly young men, honest, truthful, clean in habit and thoughts; and I would not break my heart about it if you told me that such or such a fellow writes with difficulty, can't do compound fraction, or does not know any geometry if I only knew that he has learned enough at my school to know the difference between true manliness and effeminacy. I never want again to hear “clever” people complaining that "ปัญญาท่วมหัวเอาตัวไม่รอด".

At the Mahadlek College, what I want is that Education should mean the turning of a boy into a fine young man and a good citizen, not to crush out all individuality under the weight of Syllabus and System! and I want Education to be interesting to the boys so that they would in later days be able to look back upon School life as something peculiarly pleasant to have passed through. My College is not to be compared to other schools, where the aim is different. If I had wanted just the ordinary kind of school, I would have founded a day school, not a boarding one."

== History ==
The school was founded on 29 December 1910 to provide education but also as a "reign monastery". Normally, A King would build a temple as his reign monastery, but because as there were already many temples the King decided to build a school instead based on the system of Public School in England.

In establishing, His Majesty donated his wealth to build a temporarily wooden study building on his land at Suan Krajung near Khlong Prem Prachakon at Dusit district. Then moved in the Royal Pages's students which were temporarily located near Brahman ceremony hall in Royal Palace on 11 June 1911. Then later in 1915, His Majesty donated his wealth to build a permanent Royal Pages's study building, which was composed of an assembly hall and four houses at the four corners of the school. Then His Majesty set the first stone on 20 December 1915, then in 1916 Ratchavittayaluy from the Ministry of Justice was moved onto his caring. His Majesty also established Chiang Mai Royal Pages College at Chiang Mai in 1917. Now the college in Chiang Mai is known as Yupparaj Royal's College.

The expansion of this school was stopped by the heavenly rest of Phra Mongkut Klao Chaoyuhua King Rama VI on 26 November 1925. In the next reign Siam (the name of Thailand at that time,) was having economic problems, caused Phra Pokklao Chaoyuhua Rama VII to cut His Majesty's expenses. To keep the country's money in balance, His Majesty decided to close Royal Pages College and King's College (in Thai Ra-ja-vi-ta-ya-lai) and merge them all with Royal Pages College in Bangkok in 1926. Then His Majesty gave the school a new name, Vajiravudh College, in the honor of Phra Mongkut Klao Chaoyuhua, King Rama VI or King Vajiravudh.

== Admissions ==
Vajiravudh College is a leading boarding school in Thailand that would provide general education from primary to secondary level, including moral training in the style of British public schools. A board of directors was founded to manage the school, and this tradition continues to the present day.

The all-boys boarding is exclusive for boys. The school introduces more discipline, like military boarding style, so that they can change themselves to become responsible citizens in the future. The school provides students with academic instruction, opportunities for service to others, and a range of activities directed toward the development of their skills, talents, and self-confidence for lifelong learning. It also provides students supervised leisure and sport as well as studies. The school prepares students to become leaders and equips them with the knowledge to face challenges in a cross-cultural environment.

== Buildings ==
Buildings in the school are mainly Thai style constructed e.g. Assembly hall, Clock Tower, Vajiramongkut (also called the White Building), and the houses. Prachatipok building is a sciences and mathematics education building.Phetcharat building was the science center but now it uses for language classes. The vejsukammasathid building is for computer science and arts; Vajiramongkud is for Thai language and social science. Suwattana is for music center and mathematic classes. Humanity and information resource center is for Recreation. There are a new gymnasium and music buildings.

== School's headmasters ==
The headmaster is entrusted, in the name of the King, with the authority to manage and lead the school in accordance with royal policy. Unlike most schools, the headmaster is titled ผู้บังคับการ (Commanding Officer), equivalent to a military Regiment commander.

Term	Commanding Officer
1909–1911	Phra Ohwadworakit (Hem Ponpantakit)
1911–1917	Phra Abhirakrajharit (Phraya Bariharachamanop) (Sorn Sornkate)
1917–1926	Phraya Barombathbamrung (Pin Sriwattana)
1926–1933	Phraya Prichanusat (Serm Panyarachun)
1933–1935	Phraya Barombathbamrung (Pin Sriwattana)
1935–1942	Phra Nichayasarnvithet (Path Montataththuplern)
1942–1975	Phraya Baratraja (M.L. Dosatith Isarasena)
1976–1995	Prof. Dr. Gal Isarasena na Ayutthaya
1995–2007	Prof. Dr. Chaianan Samutvanijja
2007–2016	Dr. Saroj Leesavan
2016–2021	Asst. Prof. Suravudh
2021–present	Kiattikhun Chartprasert

== Vajiravudh College centennial ==
Message from the headmaster, Dr. Saroj Leesavan, "The 100th year anniversary of the foundation of the school is held from 29 December 2010. Since the school was named as ‘Royal Pages College’ that was the beginning of the Royal policy and the modern education system from King Rama VI that will lead the country to better development. The education creates a ‘young gentlemen who will be physically and morally clean’ who will help the country and society. After 100 years, the direction from the King still stay in the student's heart and many graduated students are admitted and respected to work in an important role especially working in the name of King Rama IX which maintain the purpose of the school."
