= Sekolah Tuanku Abdul Rahman =

Coordinates: 4.5974116°N 101.1204303°E

- STAR

Location
- Jalan Sultan Azlan Shah, 31400 Ipoh; Ipoh, Perak; Malaysia

Information
- Type: Tertiary school, Boarding school, Sekolah Berasrama Penuh, Premier all-boys school
- Motto: Ilmu Panduan Hidup (Knowledge as a Guide in Life)
- Established: 1957
- School district: North Kinta (Kinta Utara)
- Principal: HM Saharuddin Bin Sadali (Since 16 May 2024)
- Enrollment: 700
- Colours: Red, White
- Slogan: Greatness Through Perseverance
- Yearbook: Perintis
- Affiliations: Sekolah Berasrama Penuh Ministry of Education (Malaysia)
- Sports House: Green, Blue, Black, Red, White, Yellow
- Website: www.staripoh.edu.my

Sekolah Tuanku Abdul Rahman (English: Tuanku Abdul Rahman School; abbreviated STAR) is an all-boys fully residential school in Malaysia funded by the Government of Malaysia. Named after the first Yang di-Pertuan Agong (King) of the Federation of Malaya, Almarhum Seri Paduka Baginda Tuanku Abdul Rahman ibni Almarhum Tuanku Muhammad, it is located in Ipoh, Perak. The school started at an army camp in Baeza Avenue (now known as Jalan Hospital). Formerly known as Malay Secondary School, the school was built by the Malayan government in 1957. In 2011, the school was awarded with the Sekolah Berprestasi Tinggi or High Performance School title, a title awarded to schools in Malaysia that have met stringent criteria including academic achievement, strength of alumni, international recognition, network and linkages.

== History ==
In the 1950s, a few hundred rural children who had completed their Malay primary level education, and their placement in a few selected schools in Ipoh, Pulau Pinang, Kuala Lipis, Kuala Lumpur and Johor Bahru were chosen to be the pioneer students of the first three Malay residential secondary schools for rural children. They were planned in Ipoh, Tg. Malim, and Melaka. These schools were later known as Sekolah Tuanku Abd Rahman (STAR), Ipoh; Sekolah Dato' Abdul Razak (SDAR), Seremban; and Sekolah Tun Fatimah (STF), Johor Bahru.

On 2 January 1967, 360 of these 13–15-year-old children were placed in five old wooden military barracks vacated by the Malay Regiments, at what was then known as Baeza Avenue, Ashby Road, Ipoh (the site where Sekolah Kebangsaan Sri Kinta, Jalan Hospital, Ipoh, now stands).

Initially, the military barracks; with twelve wooden classrooms, became the new students' school, known as the Malay Secondary School (MSS), Ipoh. Classrooms, sleeping quarters (dormitories), dining hall etc. were all cramped in the barracks within barbed wire fences surrounding the 4-acre site.

The school started on 13 January 1957, with the admission of 200 of these children into Form One. In March, another 160 joined the school to join the Remove Class. The school also welcomed Bruneian Malay into the school.

Teaching was done by a group of 15 teachers led by Hamdan Sheikh Tahir as the first principal. Classes were conducted following the standard curriculum offered in the English medium secondary schools of the day.

On 6 January 1958, the school moved to its present site along Tiger Lane, Ipoh (now Jalan Sultan Azlan Shah). On 14 May 1958, the official opening and renaming of the school by the first Prime Minister of Federation Of Malaya, Tunku Abdul Rahman Putra Al-Haj. The school is now known as Sekolah Tuanku Abdul Rahman, named after the first Yang Di Pertuan Agong of the Federation, His Majesty Tuanku Abdul Rahman. On 23 September 1958, royal Visit by His Majesty Yang Di Pertuan Agong Tuanku Abdul Rahman. In November 1959, the first batch of students sat the Lower Certificate of Education examination. In January 1960, Form Four classes started. In November 1961, STAR's first batch of candidates (155) sat for the combined Cambridge Overseas School Certificate/Federation of Malaya Certificate examinations. In January 1962, Form Six Classes started. In November 1963, STAR's first batch of Upper Six Classes (Arts and Science) sat for the Overseas Higher School Certificate examination. In January 1964, female students were admitted (STAR is a boys’ residential school) to the school joining Lower Six Science class. In January 1965, 13 girls were admitted to the school entering Lower Six classes.

In 1975, school stopped the enrolment of pupils into Remove Classes. In January 1981, enrolment of first 2nd generation Starian. Alimin Ismadi, the son of Ismail Salleh (second batch) joined Form One. In June 1981, official launch of Kelas Matrikulasi Sains with Universiti Sains Malaysia. In 1982, Silver Jubilee. On 15 August 1982, Hussein Salleh (first batch) returned to the school as Principal.

== Notable alumni ==
Old Boys Association logo.

The alumni or old boys of the school are affiliated to STAROBA, the Sekolah Tuanku Abdul Rahman Old Boys’ Association. The society is involved in activities like Old Boys Weekend and other sporting events involving alumni of other schools. The current president of the association is Faizal Othman.

Notable alumni include:

- Md Raus Sharif - the 8th Chief Justice of Malaysia
- Hamzah Zainuddin - current MP for Larut, 17th Leader of the Opposition
- Idris Jusoh - the 12th Menteri Besar of Terengganu, Former Chairman of MARA, Former Education and Higher Learning Minister II
- Muhamad Akmal Saleh - current MLA for Merlimau
- Mohd Redzuan Md Yusof - Former Minister of Entrepreneur Development
- Awang Adek Hussin - Former Ambassador of Malaysia to the United States of America and Former Deputy Ministry of Finance (Malaysia)
- Annuar Musa - Former Minister of Youth and Sports
- Mohd Zaid Ibrahim - Prominent Malaysian lawyer, Former Minister in the Prime Minister's Department in charge of legal affairs and judicial reforms
- Abdul Samad Alias - Former President of the Malaysian Institute of Certified Public Accountants, President of the Malaysian Institute of Accountants
- Tun Faisal Ismail Aziz - politician
