= Gunung =

Gunung (also spelled Gunong) is the Malay and Indonesian word for mountain —it is regularly used in volcano (as Gunung Berapi) and mountain names throughout Southeast Asia.

== Mountains using the prefixes Gunung / Gunong ==
The following are mountains that officially use the prefixes Gunung or Gunong.

Malaysia

- Gunung Angsi
- Gunung Batu Brinchang
- Gunung Banang
- Gunung Belumut
- Gunung Benarat
- Gunung Jerai
- Gunung Kinabalu
- Gunung Korbu
- Gunung Lambak
- Gunung Ledang
- Gunung Ma'okil
- Gunung Mulu
- Gunung Murud
- Gunung Nuang
- Gunong Pueh
- Gunung Pulai
- Gunung Santubong
- Gunung Tahan
- Gunung Trus Madi

Indonesia

- Gunung Agung
- Gunung Arjuna
- Gunung Batur
- Gunung Batok
- Gunung Bromo
- Gunung Ciremai
- Gunung Dempo
- Gunung Galunggung
- Gunung Gede
- Gunung Jayawijaya
- Gunung Kaba
- Gunung Kembar
- Gunung Kemukus
- Gunung Kerinci
- Gunung Krakatau
- Gunung Kemiri
- Gunung Leuser
- Gunung Merapi
- Gunung Nona
- Gunung Rinjani
- Gunung Salak
- Gunung Salahutu
- Gunung Seblat
- Gunung Semeru
- Gunung Sumbing
- Gunung Sinabung
- Gunung Sipiso-Piso
- Gunung Tambora
- Gunung Tangkuban Perahu
- Gunung Toba
