= Kluang High School =

Coordinates: 02°01′54.80″N 103°18′55.00″E

Kluang High School (Malay: Sekolah Tinggi Kluang)

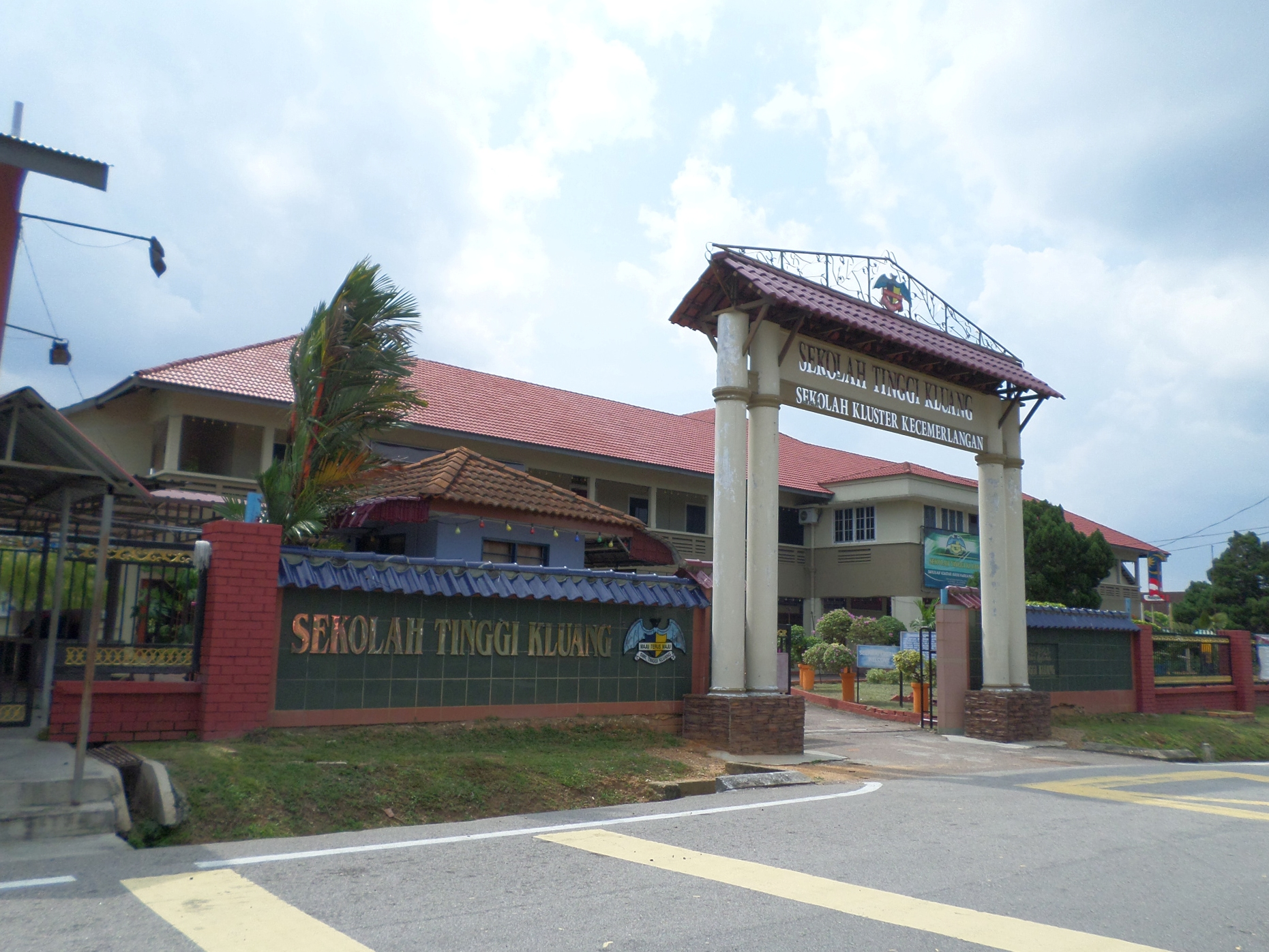
- 86000 Kluang, Johor; Malaysia

Information
- Type: National secondary school
- Motto: ON AND ONWARD (Malay: MAJU TERUS MAJU)
- Established: January 15, 1939 (age 87)
- Status: Cluster School (SKK)
- School district: Kluang
- Session: Single
- Principal: Tn Haji Zulkifli bin Ahmad (2026 - Present)
- Grades: Form One - Form Six
- Yearbook: ONWARD
- Website: www.kluanghighschool.edu.my

Kluang High School (Malay: Sekolah Tinggi Kluang) is a public secondary school in Kluang, Johor, Malaysia. It is situated opposite Kluang Police Station, near the Kluang District Education Office and is less than two kilometres away from the town centre.

An all-boys primary school at inception, it is now a co-educational secondary school with hostel facilities.

== School Name ==
Founded as Government English School (colloquially known by its initials GES), Kluang, it was renamed Secondary English School (colloquially known by its initials SES) in 1958.

The inaugural Form Six commenced in 1978 and the school name was changed - to assume its current name - on 3 March 1980.

== The Beginning ==
The then Johore state government published a request for tender for the construction of GES in December 1937. Construction of the two-storeyed concrete building with multiple classrooms, an assembly hall, tuck shop and gardeners' quarters started in 1938. Reports on the construction cost ranged from $83,000 (Straits dollar) to $170,000.

== History ==
The school commenced on 15 January 1939 with twenty students in two classes in the Volunteer Drill Hall – construction of the new building was still in progress - at Jalan Hospital. Headed by Mr Koe Ewe Teik and assisted by Inche Daud bin Mohamed Amin, the intention was to pioneer a system of admitting 10-year-old boys who have already studied a few years in vernacular schools, to be promoted to Standard III or IV - according to each boy's ability - after two years.

Subsequently, the main building was officially opened by Tunku Temenggong Ahmad on 15 May 1939.

=== 1940s ===
The number of classes doubled to four by the year 1941.

The students and staff were housed in three attap sheds at Jalan Ibrahim for a period of nine months - until June 1946 - for the British Military Administration (Malaya) requisitioned the GES building after the British re-occupation of Malaya. Upon relocating back to the school building, extra-curricular activities in the form of games were organised for students - in parallel with the resurgence in sports participation in Kluang - and a Wolf Cub Pack was established in 1947.

Eighty boys and girls who were likely to pass at least Standard III in Malay primary schools were prepared for admission to the new Special Malay Class (SMC) for 1949. Entrance to SMC was by way of a competitive examination. Following the accomplishment of this two-year programme (SMC 1 & SMC 2) of mainstream English education, they joined the other students for the final year of primary school: Standard VI. The last SMC intake was in January 1962.

The headmaster Mr. Koe Ewe Teik, who was a vice-president of the Badminton Association of Malaya, was appointed in 1948 as one of the selectors of the Malayan team that went on to win the inaugural Thomas Cup in February 1949.

GES expanded its student cohort by creating a secondary section. Mr. C. D. Westwood was appointed headmaster on 1 May 1949 and at the end of the year, the first batch of fourteen students sat for the Senior Cambridge Examinations. One of the school regulations imposed a student curfew, which stipulated that students are not to be sighted in the town centre after 8:00 PM on a school day.

=== 1950s ===
The Malay language was incorporated into the Standards III, IV and V curricula in 1950. Further, General Science was introduced in 1951.

A block of six new classrooms of timber construction - costing approximately $28,000 (Malayan dollar) - was added to the primary section in 1952. In the ensuing years, students and teachers referred to it as the 'wooden block'. The addition of this block effectively defined the fourth side of two quadrangles, one on either side of the school hall. In the late 1970s, the hall was partitioned into multiple classrooms using makeshift walls, and the quadrangles were utilised as the venue for school assemblies.

Mr. Ng Ah Ow was appointed headmaster in 1954. To broaden the extra-curricular activities, a Red Cross Link was started with 24 members that year, and in 1955 the Cadet Corps with a platoon of 30 was begun. Mr. C. R. Krishnan was the first cadet master. Cadet training was conducted by a duly qualified officer in the staff, with advice from officers of the Engineering Training Centre, British Garrison and later from the 6th Royal Malay Regiment. The British Garrison men, with their bulldozer, also helped to level the new sports field.

New science laboratories were officially opened by the State Secretary, Che’ Abdul Rahman bin Musa in 1956.

The Kluang Primary Boys' School (later renamed Tengku Mahmud School) and Kluang Primary English School were formed in August 1957. The latter school, hitherto the primary section of GES, continued to use the GES wooden block until 1962 when a part of it moved to the Tengku Mahmud School building.

With the advent of the Education Ordinance, coupled with the change in school-type to secondary-only, the GES name was changed to Secondary English School (Malay: Sekolah Menengah Inggeris) in 1958 and a Board of Governors was instituted. The headmaster at the time was Mr. M. Nair.

=== 1960s ===
Form One in the Malay medium of instruction was started in 1961 with a separate intake of students who had completed their education at Malay primary schools. On 21 December 1963, the Malay classes were incorporated - foreshadowed in the Education Ministry's announcements - into a new school, Sekolah Menengah Kebangsaan Kluang. In January 1965, the students were transferred to their school's new building at 3rd mile, Jalan Mersing. The school was renamed Sekolah Sultan Abdul Jalil later that same year.

Students who failed the Secondary Schools Entrance Examination (the local version of the British Eleven-plus) to qualify for entry into Form One had the option to enrol in a two-year course with a practical and vocational bias (e.g. carpentry and poultry-raising), at the newly started Secondary Continuation School (Malay: Sekolah Pelajaran Lanjutan) at SES on 2 April 1962. The Secondary Schools Entrance Examination was scrapped in 1964, allowing for automatic promotion of Standard VI pupils to Form One in 1965. The secondary continuation school system was abolished at the end of 1964 and the students, following a scheme to bring them up to par, were admitted to SES in 1965.

In 1963, a basketball court was built to the left of the school's main entrance, next to the science lab. In addition, a double-storey block of eight classrooms was erected next to the wooden block, resulting in a decrease in the size of the southern quadrangle.

The remaining part of the Primary English School shifted to the Tengku Mahmud School building in 1963. Both of these schools became the main feeder primary schools for SES. A new admission policy saw the introduction of Remove Classes (one-year English immersion classes prior to starting Form One) at SES for students from vernacular primary schools.

A request for tender for the building of a boys' hostel was published in 1962 and it was constructed in 1964.

In September 1965, a total of 637 Forms One & Two pupils and 25 teachers were transferred to the newly established Lower Secondary English School (Malay: Sekolah Menengah Rendah Inggeris) – headed by Mr A Sellathuray - at 3rd mile, Jalan Mersing, occupying seventeen classrooms. Students who passed the 1966 Lower Certificate of Education (LCE) examination went on to attend Form Four at SES in 1967. The Lower Secondary English School later became a fully-fledged secondary school, Sekolah Tengku Aris Bendahara.

=== 1970s ===
In 1970, a double-storey block of four classrooms plus a science lab was built adjacent to the block of eight classrooms (that was erected in 1963), thereby decreasing the size of the northern quadrangle. A car park and partial fencing of the school compound was also constructed. The headmaster at the time was Mr Chiam Tah Wen.

The following were built in 1975:

- canteen, which overlooks the football field.
- library and staff room (used as classroom), next to the above 1970-built building.
- new workshop for Industrial Arts.

The former Industrial Arts workshop (built 1958) - which is next to the new workshop - was converted to an Art Room and classroom.

In 1973, Mr. Gan Boon Tai (headmaster 1971–73) proposed a widening of the athletics field. To this end, fundraising projects were launched and when Tuan Sheikh Hussin Ali became headmaster, an outdoor sports complex alongside the field was added to the expansion plan. The complex was to consist of two concrete basketball cum volleyball courts, two concrete sepak takraw courts and two clay courts for tennis.

In 1976, following a joint effort among the school gardeners and students, the six-lane athletics field was widened to accommodate eight lanes and two hockey fields. Students contributed half of the required turf, supplanted from their home gardens. Work on the sports complex, including seating for spectators, commenced in 1977 and was completed in 1978.

The inaugural Form Six commenced in 1978 with two Lower Sixth Arts stream classes.

A horticulture unit was established in 1978 and a poultry unit was constructed in 1979.

=== 1980s ===
The school name was changed to Sekolah Tinggi Kluang (Kluang High School) on 3 March 1980. The headmaster at the time was Tuan Hj Kasmuri Sadiman.

In 1980, the following were built within the sports complex: a concrete tennis practice wall and a concrete tennis cum volleyball court.

On 29 June 1980, several prefects were pallbearers at the funeral of Mr C D Westwood at a local church.

The official opening of the sports complex was held on 4 September 1980, which coincided with the Annual Speech & Prize Giving Day and the annual games carnival between the ‘past’ vs ‘present’ pupils.

A fundraising walkathon was held on 4 April 1981, the proceeds of which went towards the building of three Science labs, an air-conditioned Reference library, a bus shelter and a roof over one of the basketball courts and spectator seating area at the sports complex. A mini aquarium was also built in 1981.

Science stream for the Sixth Form started in 1981 with two Lower Sixth Science classes.

SES has a Parent-Teacher Association and an Ex-Pupils' Association.

== School Type ==
- 1939 to 1948 - Primary
- 1949 to 1957 - Comprehensive (Primary & Secondary)
- 1958 to present - Secondary

== School Motto ==
The school motto, ON AND ONWARD, was created by the founding headmaster Mr Koe Ewe Teik.

== School Badge ==
Additionally, Mr Koe designed the school crest, that of a flying fox. The flying fox has local significance, in that the name of the town, Kluang is derived from the Malay word keluang, which is a type of fruit bat that used to swarm the town in the evenings.

== Heraldry ==
The Swiss-shaped escutcheon (shield) is party per pale (halved vertically); azure (blue) on the left, or (gold/yellow) on the right. The abbreviated school motto, ONWARD in argent (white) is on the gules (red) fess i.e. the band that runs horizontally across the shield.

A flying fox, wings displayed and inverted, is behind the shield; sable (black) & argent (white) head affronte - the crest; bleu celeste (sky blue) wings - the supporters.

The school name, in argent (white), is on the gules (red) scroll.

== School Uniform ==
The uniform continues to comply with the public schools uniform.

In the late 1970s, the public secondary school uniform for boys (up to Form Five) was transitioned from an all-white attire to white shirt & olive green trousers. In conjunction with this and to differentiate the prefects' uniform from that of the Sixth Formers': on the instigation of the prefect committee, SES exercised its authority to set uniforms for prefects i.e. an all-blue attire (sky blue & navy blue) with black leather shoes - that complement the school colours - plus the prevailing navy blue tie, and navy blue blazer for senior (second year) prefects in early 1979.

In 2013, school shoes for all other students were changed from white to black. Malay students were required to wear the traditional Malay outfit on Fridays (the final day of the school week), which was switched to Thursdays in 2014, following an amendment to the school week.

== School Song ==
Previously sung by all students at Sunday morning assemblies, by 1980 the school anthem (lyrics by Mr C. D. Westwood) was sung by the prefects at special occasions only.

The GES, Kluang - SES, Kluang then High School, Kluang - anthem has been replaced with a Malay version.

== Yearbook ==
The school magazine ONWARD was first published in 1947, inspired by Mr. K. M. Mathai the guiding force behind the GES Literary and Debating Society.

ONWARD was not produced in 1957 and so a double number for the years 1957 and 1958 was published in 1958.

SES and the Kluang Primary English School shared the same school magazine until 1962. The cover page of the 1961 (issue no. 15) ONWARD magazine featured illustrations of both school badges belonging to that era.

Cover of the 1961 (no. 15) ONWARD

== Sports Houses ==
Originally, the sports houses were named after British military leaders of the 1940s. A colour was assigned to each house based on random pick. In 1949, the house names were changed and named after former Sultans of Johor.

The result of the 19th annual Sports Day was reported in the Malay daily, Berita Harian.

The table below lists the initial house names & mottoes and those in 1949 and 1979. The yellow house has had more than one change of motto; its motto in 1959 was Biar Lambat Asalkan Selamat.

Original Name	Original Motto	Colour	Name in 1949	Motto in 1979
Alexander	Do or Die	Green	Abdullah	Do or Die
Slim	Never Say Die	Red	Abu Bakar	Strive for Success
Montgomery	To The Fore	Blue	Alluiddin	Victory with Honour
Mountbatten	Never Yield	Yellow	Sulaiman	Now or Never

== Principals ==
- (1939 - 1949) Mr. Koe Ewe Teik
- (1949 - 1954) Mr. Charles Donald Westwood
- (1954 - 1956) Mr. Ng Ah Ow
- (1956) Mr. Thor Seong Aun (acting)
- (1956 - 1957) Mr Edward Arthur Cecil Balshaw
- (1957) Mr. Thor Seong Aun
- (1957 - 1958) Mr. Khoo Eng Choon
- (1958 - 1960) Mr. M. Nair
- (1960 - 1961) Mr. K. Carthigesu
- (1961 - 1969) Mr. Thor Seong Aun
- (1969 - 1971) Mr. Chiam Tah Wen
- (1971 - 1973) Mr. Gan Boon Tai
- (1973 - 1978) Tn. Sheikh Hussin Ali
- (1979 - 1980) Mr. Harinder Singh (acting)
- (1980 - 1986) Tn. Haji Kasmuri Sadiman
- (1986 - 1991) Tn. Haji Hashim Kahat
- (1991 - 1992) Mr. Chua Yock Chuan (acting)
- (1992 – 1993) Tn. Haji Md Yusof Md Khalid
- (1994 – 1995) Tn. Haji Zainen Mohamad
- (1995 - 1998 Tn. Haji Ali bin Ismail
- (1998 - 1999) Tn. Sh Said Abdullah Al Jabri
- (2000 - 2001) Tn. HajiMarkom Giran
- (2001 - 2011) Tn. Haji Wahid Bilaji
- (2011 - 2017) Tn. Haji Rozali Bin Jemali
- (2017 - 2022) Tn. Haji Abdul Rahman b Mohd Nor
- (2022 - 2023) Tn. Haji Razali bin Jamil
- (2023 - 2026) Pn. Hajah Mariam binti Md. Noor
- (2026 - Present) Tn. Haji Zulkifli bin Ahmad
