= Mount Kemukus =

Folk shrine in Central Java, Indonesia

Coordinates: 7°20′38″S 110°49′47″E

Mount Kemukus or Gunung Kemukus (known as Sex Mountain) is a hilltop Javanese shrine in Sragen Regency, 28 kilometres (17 mi) northeast of Solo, where people from across Indonesia flock to honor a local saint. Every 35 days, rituals are conducted that involve adulterous sacred sex.

Conservative Muslim groups have threatened to shut down the site in the past, but police arrived to prevent it. In November 2014, the then-governor of Central Java, Ganjar Pranowo, reacted to a film by an Australian journalist, which had been broadcast by SBS One, that portrayed Mount Kumukus as 'Sex Mountain' and scandalized the local ritual practices. He issued a ban on the tradition of engaging in sex at the site; he said that the local practice was hazardous in terms of health—indeed, sexually transmitted diseases in the area are on the rise—and morality, and that it was shameful that the matter had attracted the attention of the outside world. The ban which also prohibited renting rooms to pilgrims caused a collapse of ritual activities at Mount Kemukus with devastating effects to the local economy. The income of the 262 families, who live at Mount Kemukus, decreased by 90 per cent. Therefore, most shops are closed and many families, who were never engaged in the sex business, have left the area.

== Shrine ==
The shrine is that of legendary prince Pangeran Samodro, son of a Javanese king, and his stepmother Nyai Ontrowulan. Legend has it that they ran away together and lived at Gunung Kemukus. It is believed that if you do something even more shameful there, such as having adulterous sex, then you will be blessed with good fortune. It must be done on the auspicious day of Jumat Pon, when the Friday on the Gregorian calendar intersects with one of the five days of the ancient Javanese calendar.

The shrine attracts up to 8,000 pilgrims on the busiest nights and has an entry fee of around 5,000 rupiah (around 50 US cents).

== Ritual ==
Devotees have been trekking up Kemukus in the current fashion since the late 19th century, and only in the 1980s were hostels added—with couples having sex under trees prior to that.

The ritual involves prayers and offerings of flowers at the grave of Pangeran Samodro and Nyai Ontrowulan. Pilgrims must then wash themselves at one of the sacred springs on the hill and find a stranger to have sex with. They need to have sex seven times. That is every 35 days, so it is a relationship that lasts around a year. Thus, the couples must make a significant commitment to each other. They need to exchange phone numbers and addresses and decide where to meet again, so they can complete the ritual. Most people who perform the ritual are small business owners. They hope that if they carry out the ritual, their business will improve, and they will be financially successful.

According to Floribertus Rahardi, an Indonesian writer who has studied the ritual, "People believe that they [Pangeran Samodro and Nyai Ontrowulan] committed incest in that place, but before they had finished having sex they were chased by the soldiers of Demak, killed, and buried together in one hole. From there, word emerged that whoever can finish off their sexual act will receive blessings from Nyai Ontrowulan."

The ritual is not seen anywhere else in Indonesia or the rest of the Muslim world. It is a product of a Javanese blend of folk religious ideas.

== See also ==
- Sexual ritual
- Sacred prostitution
- Abangan
