= SMS Johor =

Coordinates: 2°00′56.0″N 103°18′35.2″E

- SMSJ
- Kluang, Johor; Malaysia

Information
- Type: Public boarding school Sekolah Berprestasi Tinggi
- Motto: BUDI KARYA BAKTI; Wisdom Opus Devotion
- Founded: 23 May 1973
- Principal: Tuan Mohd. Sofian Bin Mohd. Aris
- Grades: Form 1 - 5
- Gender: Male & Female
- Age range: 13 - 17
- Enrollment: approx. 600
- Classes: Lower Form: Malaysia, Matlamat, Merdeka, Muafakat Upper Form: Signifikan, Sinergi, Superior, Tesla (Science)
- Language: Malay, English, Mandarin, German, Arabic, Korean
- Houses: Purnama, Suria, Buana, Segara
- Slogan: Saya Mahu Sentiasa Juara
- Nickname: Science Johore, SMSJ, SMSJDT, SCORE
- Yearbook: MERCU
- Affiliations: Sekolah Berasrama Penuh; Ministry of Education Malaysia
- Alumni: Sains Johor Alumni (SAJOHA)
- Website: sciencejohor.com

Sekolah Menengah Sains Johor (English: Johore Science Secondary School; abbreviated SMSJ), is a boarding school located in Kluang, Johor, Malaysia. Established on 23 May 1973, SMSJ is the first boarding school or Sekolah Berasrama Penuh (SBP) ever built in the state of Johor and the 16th SBP built in Malaysia under the 2nd Malaysia Plan. In 2023, the school commemorated its 50th anniversary. Widely known as Sains Johor, an alumnus of this school is known as a SAJOHA (SAins JOHor Alumni).

== History ==
SMSJ was established in the year 1973 under the Second Malaysia Plan. The foundation of the construction was officiated by the Director of Education, Tun Hamdan bin Sheikh Tahir.

Students of the first batch were placed temporarily in English College Johore Bahru until the completion of the school's infrastructure in the month of April 1974. The first principal was Tuan Syed Ahmad Omar Al-Atas and since then, 13 principals have been on duty.

Situated at a mere one kilometer from Kluang, the school covers an area of 32 acres and it provides ample facilities for secondary students. From the year 1974 to 1984, the school received Form 6 students and from the year 1985 until 1989, the school carried out GCE A-Level. After that, the school maintains receiving only Form 1 to Form 5 students until now.

The main field (Padang A), was completed in 1976 and the second field (Padang B), was completed in 1988. The fields are used for various sports occasions and training .

From 1996 to 2016, the school reserved two classes for students majoring in Technical Science and three classes for students majoring in Pure Science. Since 2022, only Pure Science are offered in the school. Starting from 2023, all Form 4 students will participate in the Dual Language Programme (DLP). SCORE was named a smart school in 1999.

In 2011, the school received the Cluster School title (thanks to the school's tremendous Mathematics and hockey team achievements), and finally in 2012, the school was officially designated as one of the high performance schools in Malaysia.

== Principals ==
No.	From	To	Principal Name
1.	1973	1974	Tuan Syed Ahmad b. Syed Omar
2.	1974	1981	Hamzah b. Hj.Abdul Rahid, P.I.S
3.	1982	1984	Tuan Haji Abu Bakar b. sulaiman
4.	1984	1985	Abd Malik b. Ismail
5.	1986	1987	Tuan Hj. Shukor b. Md Dom, P.I.S
6.	1987	1988	Tuan Hj. Mohd Ropi b. Jahis, P.I.S
7.	1988	1994	Tuan Hj. Abu Naim b. Hj Siran, P.I.S
8.	1994	1997	Jailani b. Rusni
9.	1997	December 1997	Tuan Hj. Rokhani b. Mangi
10.	April 1998	December 1998	Tuan Hj. Abdullah b. Idrus
11.	December 1998	June 2001	Tuan Hj. Umar b. Kamari
12.	June 2001	August 2002	Tuan Hj. Kamarudin b. Abu
13.	2002	2010	Tuan Hj. Nojumuddin b. Abd Samad
14.	2010	August 2013	Tuan Hj. Idris B. Ahmad
15.	August 2013	2017	Encik Ibrahim B. Omar
16.	2018	2020	Tuan Hj. Kuswandi B. Tayen
17.	2020	Feb 2022	Pn Hjh Fazidah binti A. Sani
18.	Feb 2022	March 2024	Pn Unaizah binti Mohd Attas
19.	March 2024	Present	Tuan Mohd. Sofian Bin Mohd. Aris

== Notable alumni ==
- YB Datuk Ahmad Maslan - First Deputy Minister of Finance, Pontian MP
- YBhg Dato' Hidayat Abdul Hamid - Malaysia High Commissioner to India
- YBhg Datuk Dr. Aminuddin Hassim - President of Putrajaya Corporation
- Ragunath Kesavan - Former President of the Malaysian Bar Council
- Tuan Hj Salehuddin Hj Hassan - Mayor of Iskandar Puteri
- Vikneswaran Iswarapatham - Deputy President Kuala Lumpur Hockey Association (KLHA), Former coach Pasukan Hoki Terengganu-THT (Terengganu Hockey Team), Former Malaysia National Hockey Player
