= Kluang =

- Town and district capital
- Kluang Town; Bandar Kluang
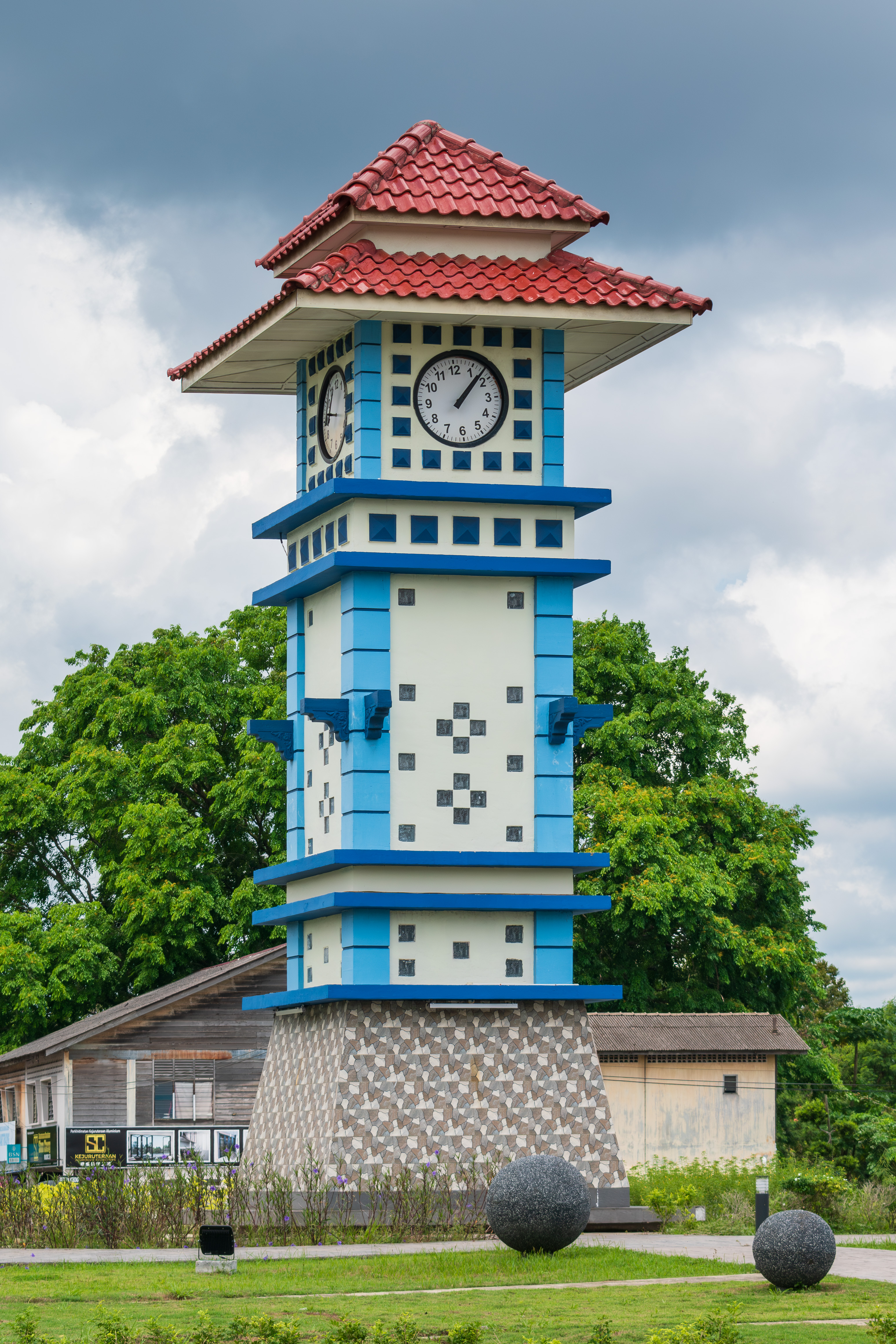
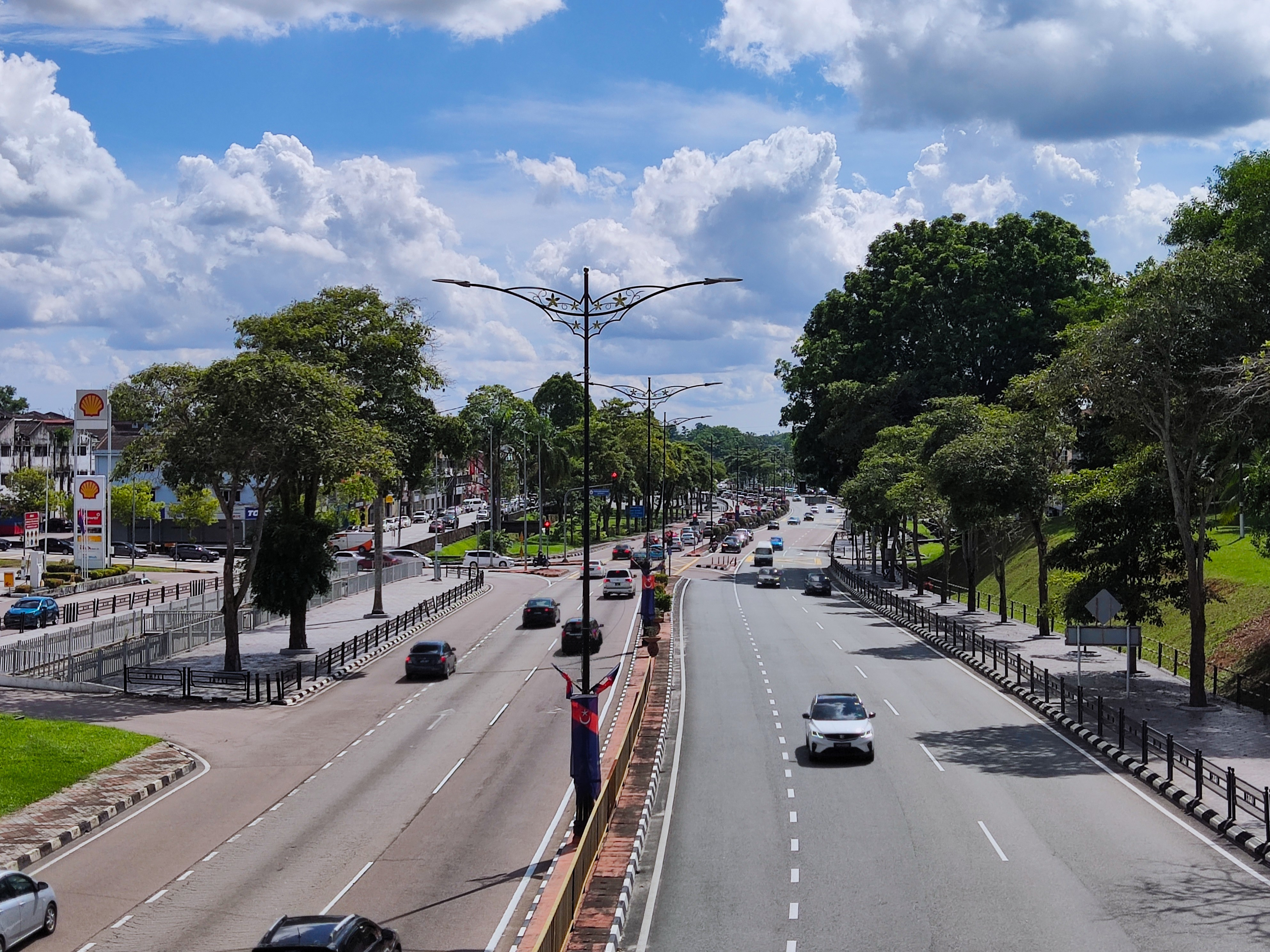
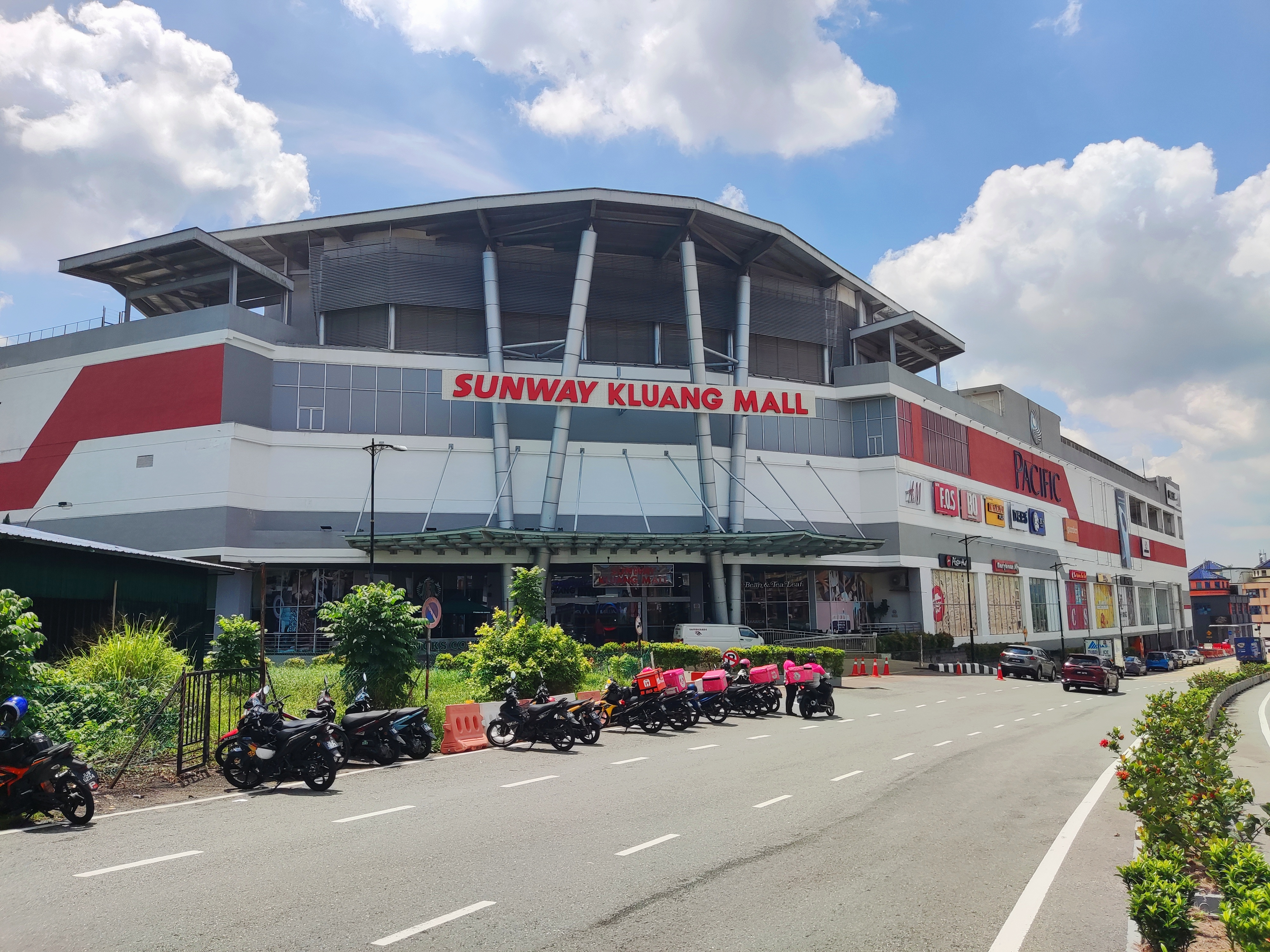
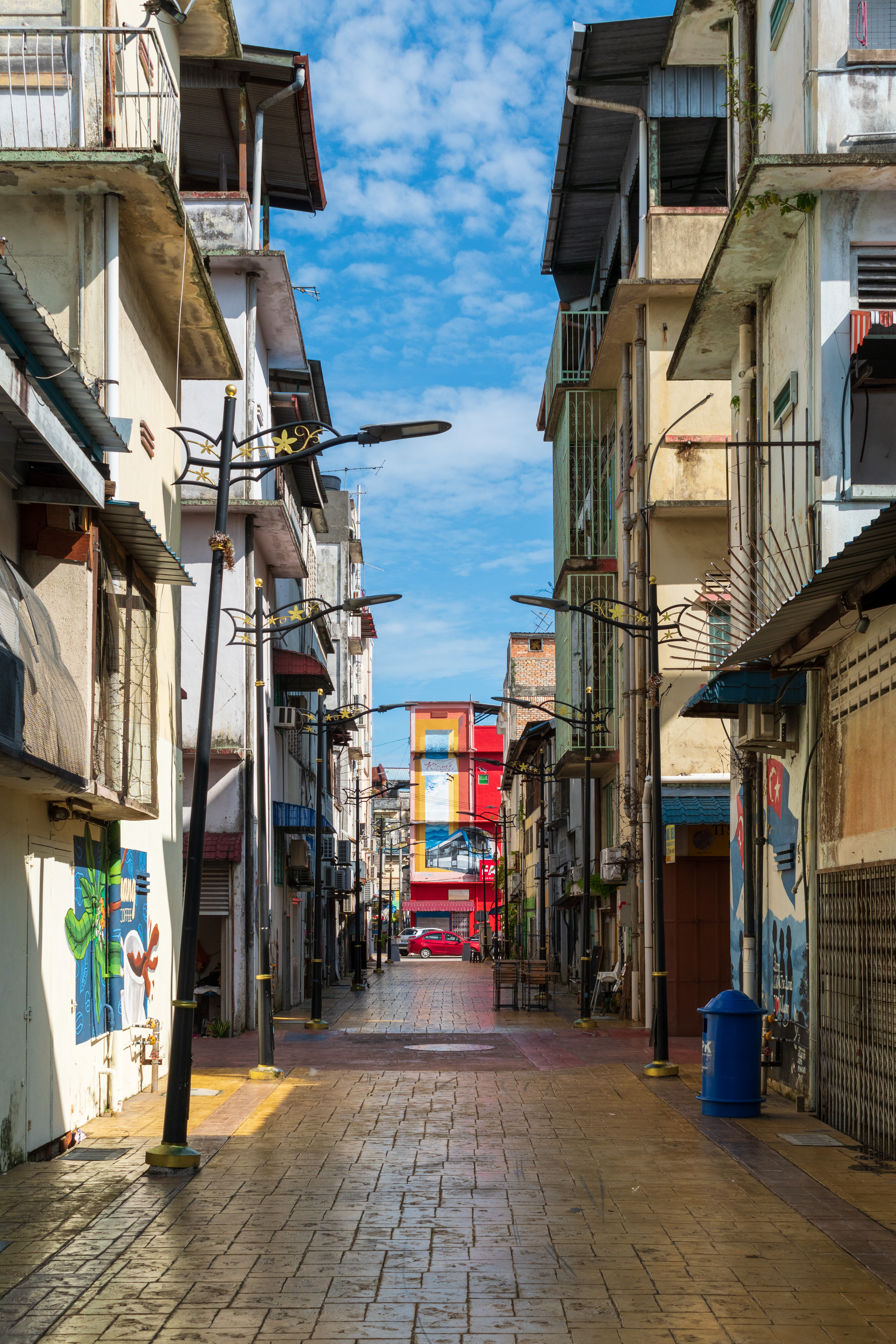
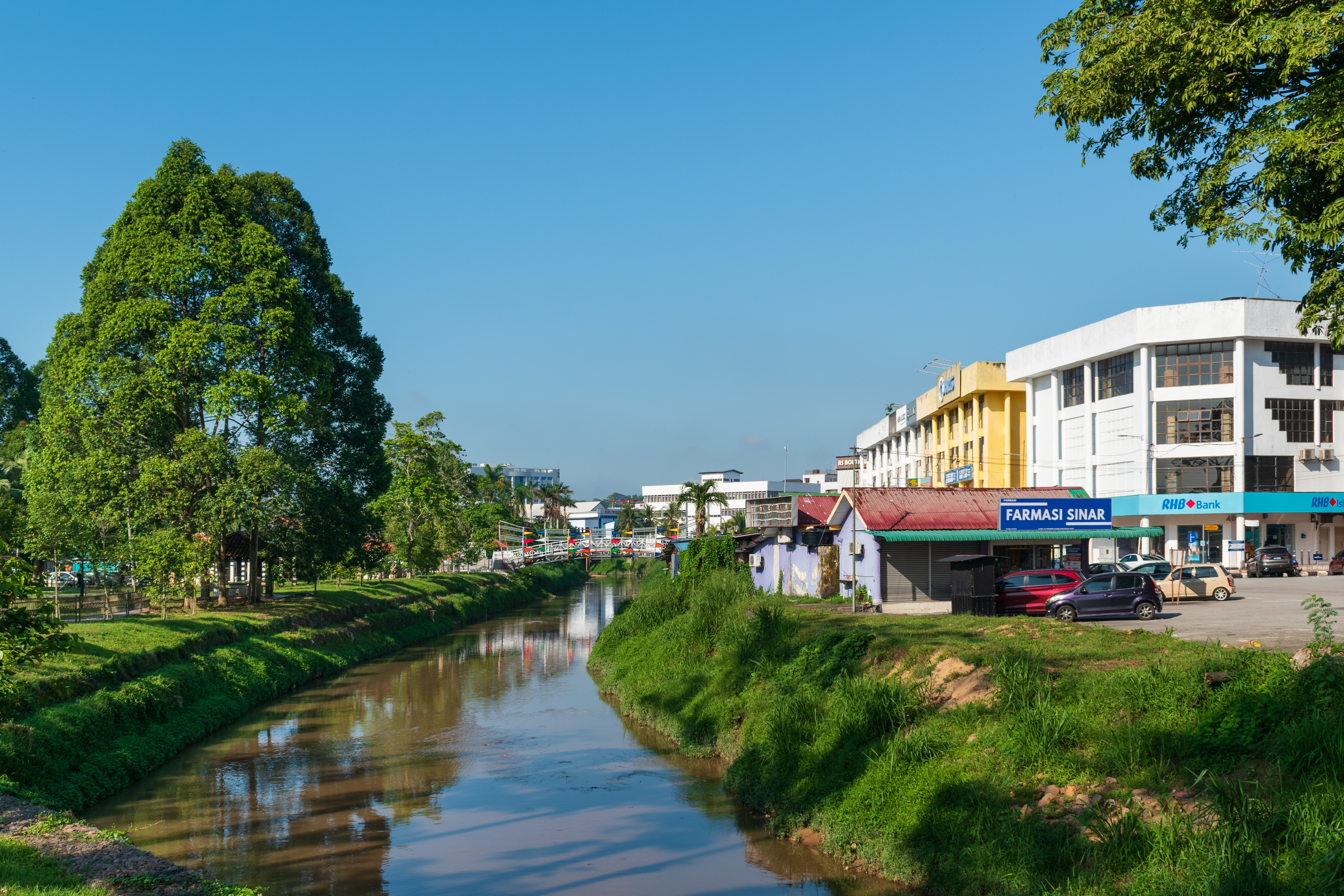
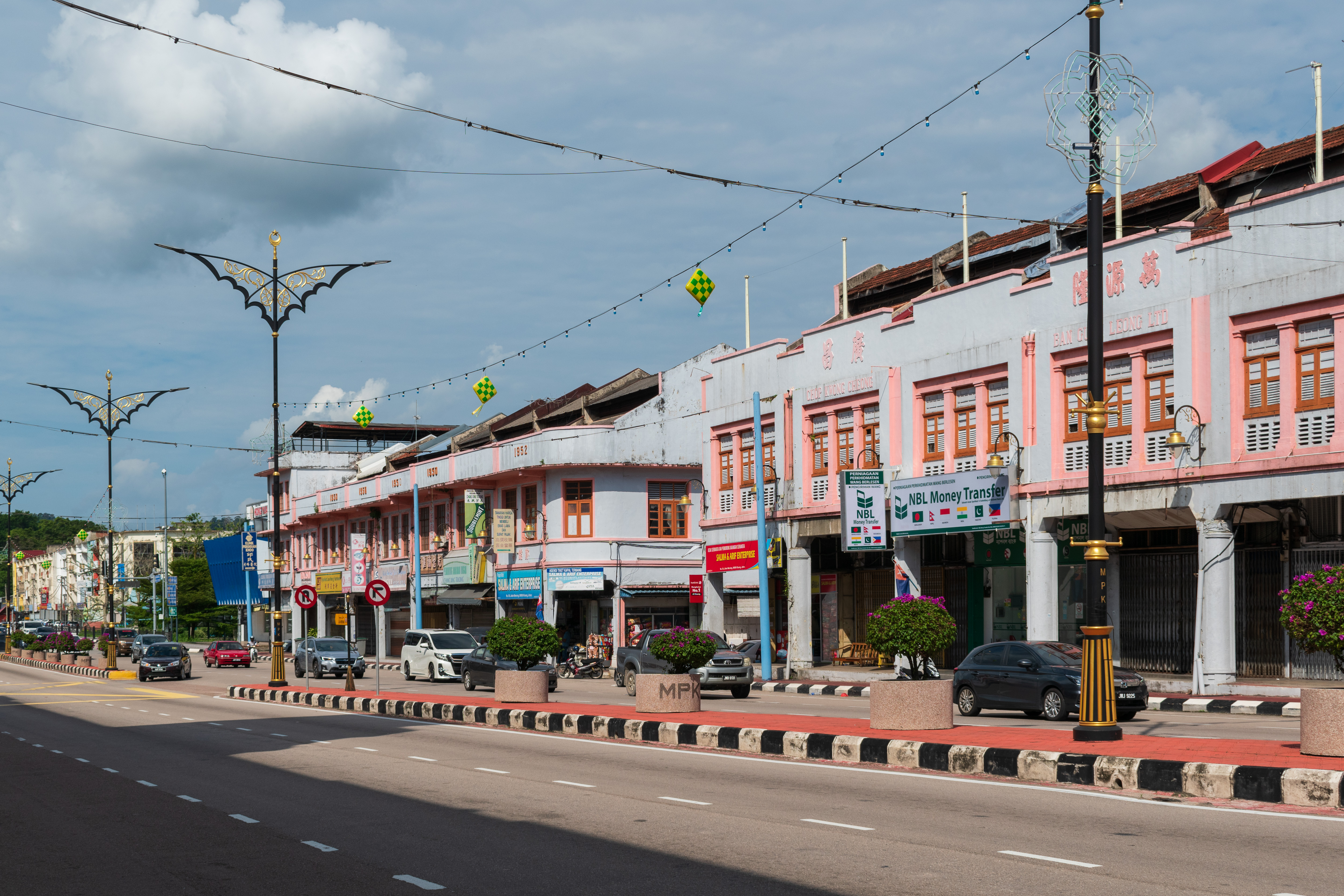
- Clock tower Jalan Batu Pahat Sunway Kluang Mall Street Art Alley Mengkibol River Jalan Mersing

- Seal
- Motto(s): Maju Sejahtera "Progress, Prosper" (motto of Kluang Municipal Council)
- Interactive map of Kluang
- Kluang in Johor Kluang (Malaysia) Kluang (Southeast Asia) Kluang (Asia)
- Coordinates: 2°2′1″N 103°19′10″E
- Country: Malaysia
- State: Johor
- District: Kluang
- Establishment: 1915
- Granted municipal status: 8 May 2001

Government
  - Type: Municipal council
  - Body: Kluang Municipal Council
  - President: Mohd Fahmy Yahya

Area
  - District: 2,852 km^{2} (1,101 sq mi)
  - Urban: 126.57 km^{2} (48.87 sq mi)

Population (2022)
  - District: 323,762
  - Density: 113.5/km^{2} (294/sq mi)
  - Urban: 204,964
  - Rural: 19,340
- Time zone: UTC+8 (MST)
  - Summer (DST): UTC+8 (Not observed)
- Postcode: 86000
- Calling code: +60-7
- Vehicle registration: J
- Website: www.mpkluang.gov.my

Kluang, formerly spelled Keluang, is a town and the district capital of Kluang District, Johor, Malaysia. Founded in 1915 by the British as the administrative capital for central Johor, Kluang is situated in the central geographical core of the state and lies within a 90-minute drive of major urban hubs across Johor.

Combined with neighboring Batu Pahat, central Johor encompasses a total market catchment exceeding 700,000 residents. Throughout the 20th century, Kluang's agricultural economy transitioned from natural rubber cultivation to large-scale palm oil production. In recent decades, it has developed a major organic farming sector alongside ecotourism destinations such as Zenxin Organic Park, UK Agro Farm, and Kahang Organic Eco Rice Farm. The district also houses a significant industrial base, particularly in ceramic tile manufacturing, earning it a reputation as the "tile capital of Malaysia".

== History ==
The name Kluang originates from the Malay word keluang, referring to a species of flying fox or fruit bat that was historically abundant in the region prior to widespread deforestation and habitat loss.

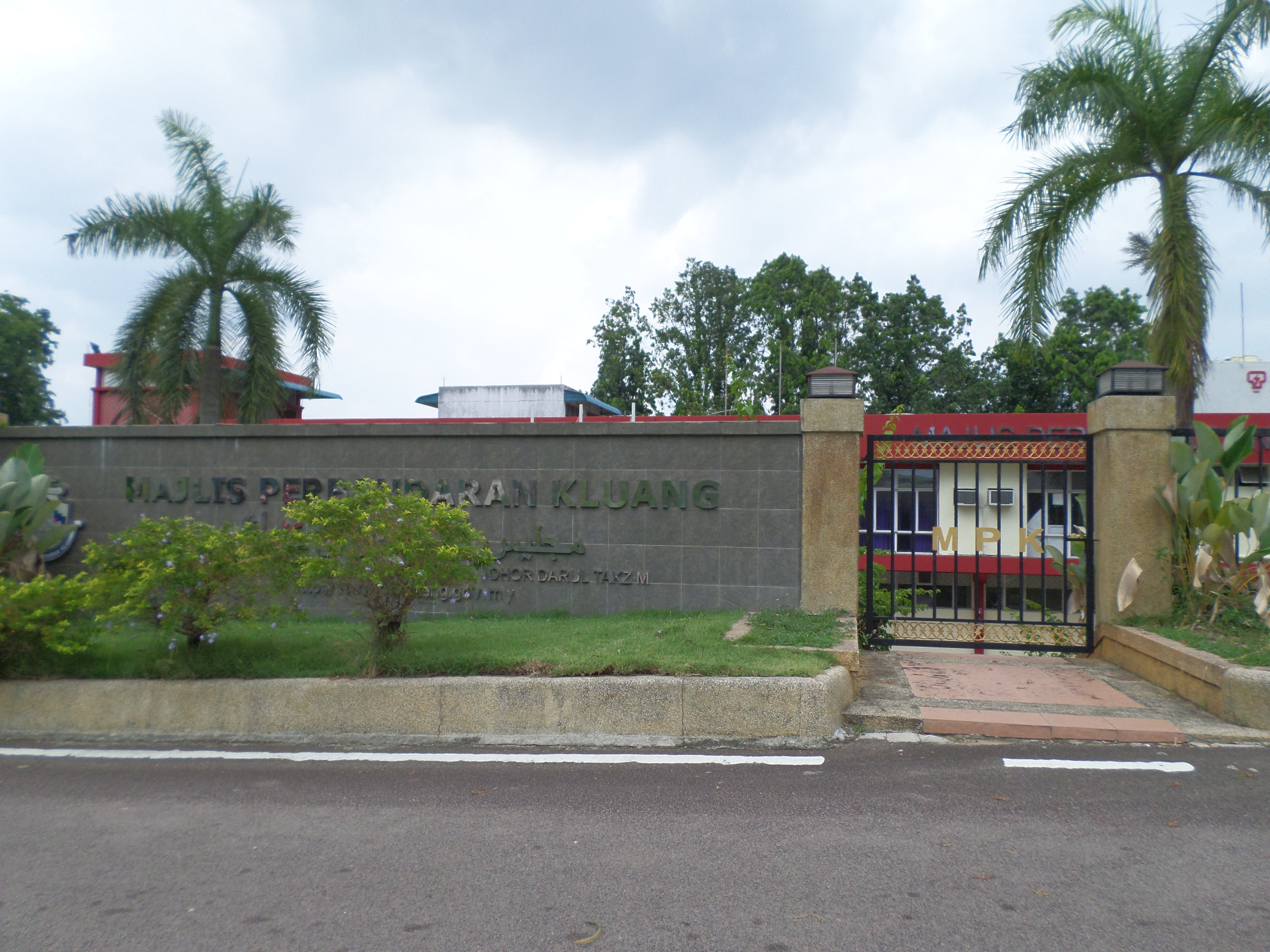
The Kluang Municipal Council enforcement department office at the local government office complex.

Kluang was established in 1915 as the administrative hub for central Johor under British colonial rule. The construction of the main Malayan Railway line passing through the town accelerated its early urban and economic growth, which was further supported by road links connecting Kluang south-eastward to Johor Bahru, south-westward to Batu Pahat, and north-eastward to Mersing.

During World War II, Imperial Japanese forces occupied Kluang on 25 January 1942 during their swift advance southwards following the retreat of Allied troops toward Singapore. General Tomoyuki Yamashita relocated his forward headquarters from Kuala Lumpur to Kluang on 27 January 1942. The Japanese military subsequently operated the local airfield as an airbase for bombing strikes targeting Singapore and Sumatra.

In the mid-1950s, during the Malayan Emergency, the airfield served as a base for reconnaissance aircraft and military helicopters tracking communist insurgents operating in the Gunung Lambak area, as well as an artillery base. The airfield hosted the Kluang Flying Club, which operated Tiger Moth biplanes. Insurgent activity around Kluang largely subsided in the months leading to Malayan Independence in 1957. The surrounding area was developed into a major military garrison hosting various units and a field hospital. The 75 Aircraft Workshop, an aviation support unit, was based in Kluang from 1946 until 1970.

In 1969, Kluang experienced a major disaster when the Mengkibol River overflowed by 7 to 10 ft (2.1 to 3.0 m), causing extensive property damage throughout the town center.

Today, the Malaysian Army maintains a significant presence in Kluang at Kem Batu Tiga and Kem Mahkota, the latter housing the Malaysian Army Aviation unit (881 Squadron).

== Geography ==
Kluang is situated in central Johor and is entirely landlocked. The town lies in a terrain of undulating hills; its most prominent geographical landmark is Gunung Lambak, an isolated peak standing at 510 metres (1,670 ft) above sea level situated on the eastern outskirts of the town. In the eastern segment of the district lies the Gunung Belumut Recreational Forest.

The administrative area governed by the Kluang Municipal Council covers approximately 126.57 km^{2} (48.87 sq mi). Three main watercourses flow through the town area: the Mengkibol River bisects the town center, while the Melantai River runs through the eastern sector and the Sembrong River flows across the west.

Urban expansion from the 1970s through the 2000s saw Kluang grow horizontally along major east-west arterial corridors. Over this period, the commercial core expanded significantly as former rubber and oil palm agricultural land was redeveloped into residential subdivisions and commercial precincts.

== Demographics ==
In 2010, the population of Kluang District stood at 319,629 residents.

By 2022, the district population reached 323,762 people out of four million statewide, with males accounting for 55.4% of the population.

== Government and politics ==
Kluang Municipal Council Majlis Perbandaran Kluang
- Emblem

Type
- Type: Local authority of Kluang

History
- Founded: 8 May 2001
- Preceded by: Kluang North District Council

Leadership
- President: Mohd Fahmy Yahya (Since 20 October 2024)
- Secretary: Azmi Ahmad (Since 1 January 2024)

Structure
- Seats: 24
- Political groups: Councillors: BN (24): UMNO (14); MCA (8); MIC (2)
- Length of term: 1 April 2024–31 December 2025

Motto
- Maju Sejahtera (Progress, Prosper)

Meeting place
- Wisma Baharu Majlis Perbandaran Kluang, Persiaran Utama Bandar Primer, 86000 Kluang, Johor

Website
- www.mpkluang.gov.my

The Kluang Municipal Council (Malay: Majlis Perbandaran Kluang, MPKluang), formerly known as the Kluang North District Council (Malay: Majlis Daerah Kluang Utara), is the local government body administering Kluang town and surrounding areas. It was elevated to municipal council status on 8 May 2001. The former North District Council was created on 1 January 1977 through the merger of the Kluang Town Council (originally established as the Kluang Town Board in 1920) with local councils governing Kampong Paya, Kampong Gajah, Sri Lalang, Chamek, and Paloh. The council headquarters relocated to Wisma Baharu MPKluang on Persiaran Utama Bandar Primer on 1 July 2025, moving from its long-time facility at Jalan Kota Tinggi.

=== Presidents of Kluang ===
Thirty-eight individuals have served as president of the local authority since 1932.

#	Name	Term start	Term end
1	Isa Ahmad	1932	1945
2	Rahman Jaafar	1945	1949
3	Hassan Omar	1950	1952
4	Salim Sabtu	1952	1953
5	Raja Omar Chik	1953	1955
6	Zainal Abidin Mohamed	1955	1957
7	Abdullah Ahmad	1957	1959
8	Salleh Ismail	1959	1960
9	Raub Saat	1960	1962
10	Ibrahim Majid	1962	1964
11	Kadir Abdullah	1964	1966
12	Rahman Ahmad	1966	1968
13	Osman Wahid	1968	1969
14	Abdullah Rahman	1969	1972
15	Ithnin Maarud	1972	1974
16	Sulaiman Md Noor	1974	1976
17	Sukiman Sahlan	1976	1979
18	Rahmat Asri	1979	1980
19	Hasmoni Salim	1980	1982
20	Musiran Ali	1982	1985
21	Ismail Aziz	1985	1988
22	Johari Suratman	1988	1995
23	Zabha Umar	1995	1997
24	Abd Kadir Maksom	1997	1999
25	Hamsan Saringat	2000	2003
26	Jabar Md Tahir	1 January 2004	31 May 2004
27	Abd Razak Md Salleh	1 June 2004	31 January 2006
28	Muji Salimon	1 February 2006	31 December 2006
29	Mislan Karmani	1 January 2007	16 January 2008
30	Abd Rahman Mohamed Dewam	16 January 2008	31 March 2011
31	Ahmad Ma'in	1 April 2011	31 May 2013
32	Adib Azhari Daud	1 June 2013	20 June 2015
33	Ismail Abu	21 June 2015	16 January 2017
34	Nasri Md Ali	17 January 2017	31 October 2018
35	Mohd Rafi Abdullah	1 November 2018	30 January 2021
36	Norliyati Md Nor	1 February 2021	14 February 2023
37	Azurawati Wahid	15 February 2023	19 October 2024
38	Mohd Fahmi Yahya	20 October 2024	Present

=== Secretaries of Kluang ===
Thirty-seven individuals have served as council secretary.

#	Name	Term start	Term end
1	Idris Mohamed	1961	1961
2	Jamari Karyadi	1961	1963
3	Ibrahim Abdul Ghani	1963	1963
4	Sarajudin Ali	1964	1965
5	Ibrahim Abdul Ghani	1965	1965
6	Abu Bakar Ahmad	1965	1967
7	Najib Masod	1967	1968
8	Ibrahim Abdul Ghani	1968	1969
9	Endan Dahlan	1969	1970
10	Mohamad Abdullah	1970	1970
11	Onn Ahmad	1971	1971
12	Mohamad Ibrahim Jaafar	1971	1972
13	Shahron Abdul Wahab	1972	1975
14	Ismail Yunos	1975	1975
15	Abdul Rahman Ahmad	1975	1976
16	Baderi Dasuki	1977	1980
17	Noh Mohamad	1981	1982
18	Fadhil Mohd Noh	1982	1986
19	Jumali Ahmad	1987	1988
20	Jabar Tahir	1989	1990
21	Halim Haron	1990	1992
22	Abdul Jamal Puteh	1992	1995
23	Md Tamrin Aliman	1995	1996
24	Abd Karim Abu Bakar	1996	1997
25	Norizan Kulob	1997	1999
26	Ayub Supaat	2000	2001
27	Kamarudin Abdullah	2002	2002
28	Mohd Shukri Mohd Masbah	2002	2003
29	Abdul Malek Ismail	2003	2006
30	Zulkiflee Abbas	16 February 2006	16 January 2008
31	Mulzaldin Mohamed	16 January 2008	31 May 2011
32	Mohd Radzi Mohd Amin	1 June 2011	15 July 2014
33	Mustaffa Kamal Shamsudin	16 July 2014	20 June 2015
34	Mohamad Radif Kosnin	21 June 2015	13 February 2019
35	Shahril Azizi Abd Gapar	14 February 2019	14 April 2020
36	Mohamad Yazid Baharudin	15 April 2020	31 December 2023
37	Azmi Ahmad	1 January 2024	Present

=== Municipal Administration Zones ===
For local administration, the municipality is divided into 24 administrative zones, each represented by an appointed local councillor.

Zone	Councillor	Political affiliation
Kahang A	Abdul Ghani Abdul Rashid	UMNO
Paloh A	Atan Ibrahim	UMNO
Paloh B	Au Xian Jie	MCA
Sri Lalang	Gan Lee Chiu	MCA
Kampong Melayu	Haslina Mohammad Dom	UMNO
Kampong Paya	Kelly Chye Pei Yee	MCA
Taman Intan	Izaluddin Akmat	UMNO
Town Centre (Bandar)	Law Mona	MCA
Taman Puteri	Mohd Saim Paiman	UMNO
Taman Suria	Law Yew Shen	MCA
Taman Megah	Raman M Govindan Nair	MIC
Sri Kluang	Mohd Khairul Ishak	UMNO
Kahang B	Siti Norreha Hussin	UMNO
Taman Delima	S Sarasvathi K.Sinatambi	MIC
Taman Kasih	Zainal Mohamed	UMNO
Taman Sri Tengah	Zakiah Pardi	UMNO
Taman Pelangi	Zaimani Jamaluddin	UMNO
Yap Tau Sah	Yap Zhi Peng	MCA
Taman Kluang Barat	Azizul Ali	UMNO
Taman Ilham	Abd Hamid Dahlan	UMNO
Chamek	Go Yen Hong	MCA
Gunung Lambak	Shey Risha Abdul Karim	UMNO
Kampung Gajah	Lim Yew Chin	MCA
Taman Seri Impian	Syed Hussin Syed Abdullah	UMNO

== Agriculture ==
Following its founding in 1915, Kluang developed predominantly as a center for rubber cultivation under major plantation companies including Guthrie Ropel, Asiatic Plantations, and Harrisons & Crosfield. Industrial innovations, such as the vacuum evaporation of latex developed by Revertex, were introduced locally. Notable rubber plantations surrounding the town included Lambak Estate, Mengkibol Estate, Kluang Estate, Coronation Estate, Wessington Estate (renamed Simpang Renggam Estate), Benut Estate, Paloh Estate, Sepuloh Estate, Chamek Estate, Niyor Estate, Kahang Estate, Pamol Estate, and Kekayaan Estate.

Starting in the 1970s, rubber estates were systematically replanted with oil palms. Today, Kluang houses extensive oil palm holdings, as well as cocoa and tea cultivation. Pamol Estate, owned by IOI Corporation, is an active producer with 12,044 hectares (29,760 acres) of certified sustainable palm oil plantations producing over 56,000 tonnes annually.

The district also developed an organic farming industry. The 100-acre Zenxin Agri-Organic Food farm is among the largest organic vegetable producers in Malaysia. The Kluang Modern Agriculture Project (Projek Pertanian Moden Kluang), launched in 2004 across 9,000 acres, houses livestock and herbal farms including UK Agro Farm. In Kahang, the Kahang Organic Eco Rice Farm operates as Malaysia's first certified organic rice paddy enterprise.

== Industry and commerce ==
Kluang maintains a diverse industrial manufacturing sector alongside its agricultural base, producing polymers, paper products, textiles, ceramics, industrial coatings, and electrical goods.

The town is a manufacturing center for ceramic tiles. Companies such as MML (Malaysian Mosaics), Terreal, Venus Ceramic, and Guocera operate major industrial facilities in Kluang, contributing to Malaysia's global tile production.

Multinational manufacturing facilities in the district include Kimberly-Clark's tissue paper manufacturing plant and Liebherr Group's refrigeration unit production plant. Synthomer plc operates a major nitrile latex manufacturing complex in Kluang, inheriting facilities originally established by Revertex Ltd. The facility produces nitrile latex utilized in the global medical glove manufacturing industry.

The downtown commercial district lies within the Kluang Inner Ring Road and hosts major commercial banks, retail complexes, and services.

== Transport ==
=== Road ===
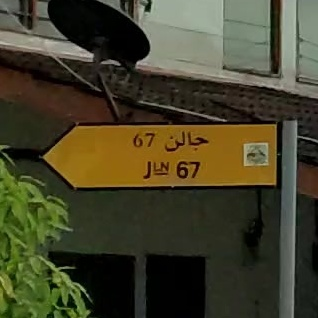
Street sign along Jalan 67 in Kluang, Johor.

Kluang is accessible via Exit 244 (Ayer Hitam) on the PLUS Expressway. Federal Route 50 connects Batu Pahat through downtown Kluang eastward toward Kahang, Jemaluang, and Mersing.

=== Rail ===
Keretapi Tanah Melayu (KTMB) serves the Kluang railway station located along Jalan Stesen. Under the Gemas–Johor Bahru electrified double-tracking project, rail infrastructure through Kluang is integrated into the electrified intercity network connecting to Kuala Lumpur, Johor Bahru, and Butterworth.

=== Bus ===
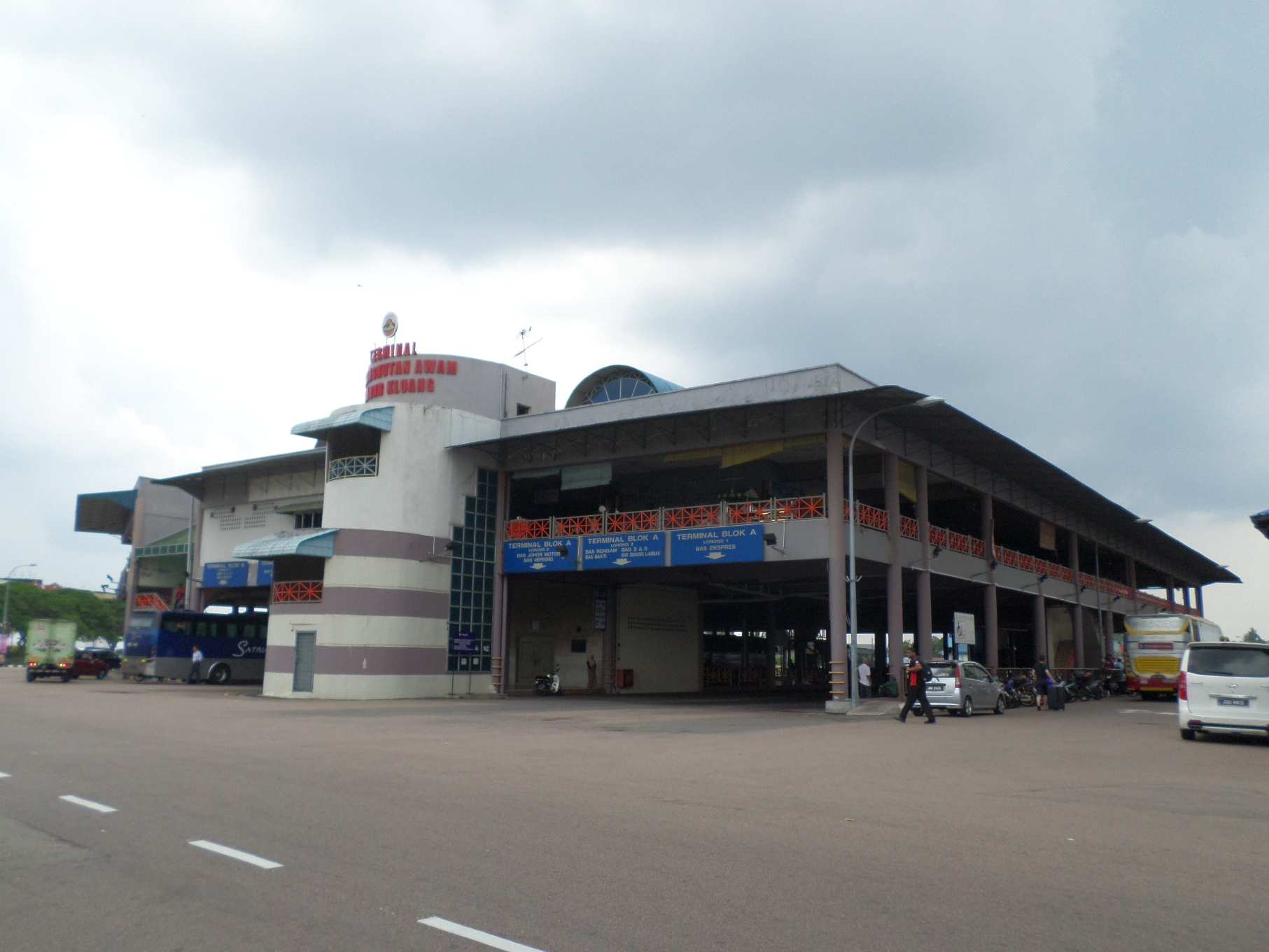
Kluang Town Bus Terminal

The Kluang express bus terminal is located on Jalan Bakawali next to Plaza BCB. Express intercity buses connect Kluang to major urban centers in Peninsular Malaysia and Singapore.

=== Air ===
A military airfield ((ICAO: WMAP)) operated by the Royal Malaysian Air Force is situated in Kluang. The nearest commercial facility is Senai International Airport (IATA: JHB) in Kulai District, situated approximately 90 km (56 mi) south.

== Infrastructure ==
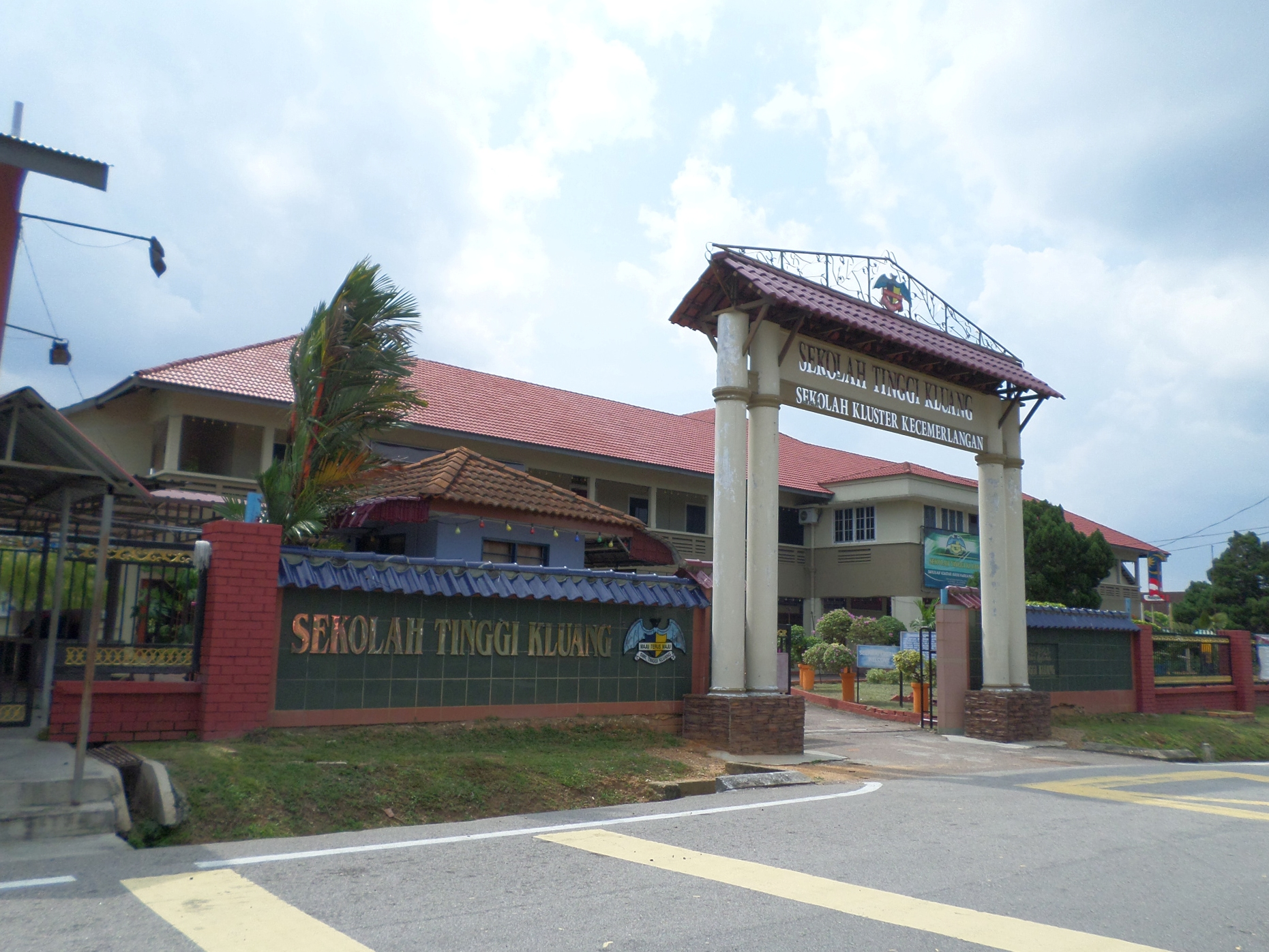
Kluang High School

Kluang is served by a district police station and a fire station.

Kluang Hospital is managed by the Ministry of Health and located in the southern part of the town. There also a KPJ Kluang Utama Specialist Hospital.

=== Education ===
Sekolah Menengah Sains Johor (SMS Johor), was the first government boarding secondary school with a special emphasis on science subjects. It was founded in 1973 and currently has over 500 students.

Kluang High School or Sekolah Tinggi Kluang is one of the best known schools in Kluang and was founded in 1939. It now has over 1,500 students.

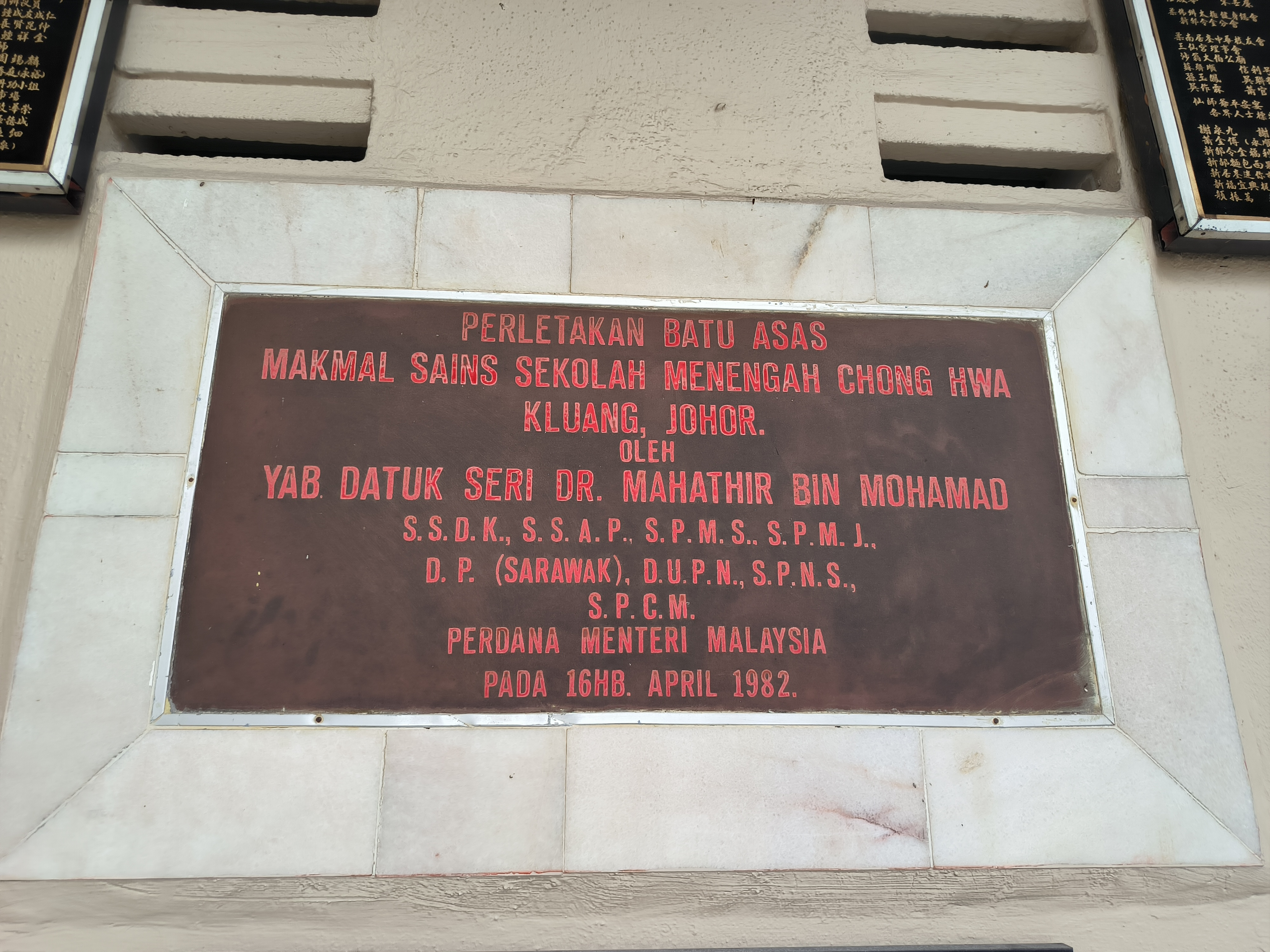
Foundation stone of Chong Hwa High School's science block, unveiled by Prime Minister Mahathir Mohamad on 16 April 1982

The Chong Hwa High School is the third biggest Chinese secondary school in Malaysia and was financially established by reputable Chinese settlers in the 1940s. The school enrolls over 3,000 students.

== Culture and tourism ==
Kluang is a center for agritourism and nature recreation. Hiking trails on Gunung Lambak and Gunung Belumut are popular local destinations.

The town is also noted for its regional coffee culture, represented by Kluang RailCoffee at the main railway station, which has operated since 1938.

== Sister cities ==
- Kajang, Selangor, Malaysia
- Taiping, Perak, Malaysia

== Notable people ==
- Samy Vellu, President of Malaysian Indian Congress (MIC)(1979–2010), Minister of Works (1995–2008)
- Ali Hamsa, Chief Secretary to the Government
- Chieh Yuan (1945–1977), Actor and martial artist
- Lee San Choon, President of Malaysian Chinese Association (MCA)(1975–1983)
- Ng Tian Hann, Malaysia Chinese Movie Director
- Shebby Singh, Malaysian former footballer
- Nur Izzuddin, badminton player
- Noraniza Idris, singer and actress
- Bishop Dato' Charles K. Samuel, Suffragan Bishop of the Anglican Church of West Malaysia

== See also ==
- Kluang (federal constituency)
- Kluang District
