= Mengkibol River =

River of Johor, Malaysia

Coordinates: 2°02′26.6″N 103°19′22.6″E

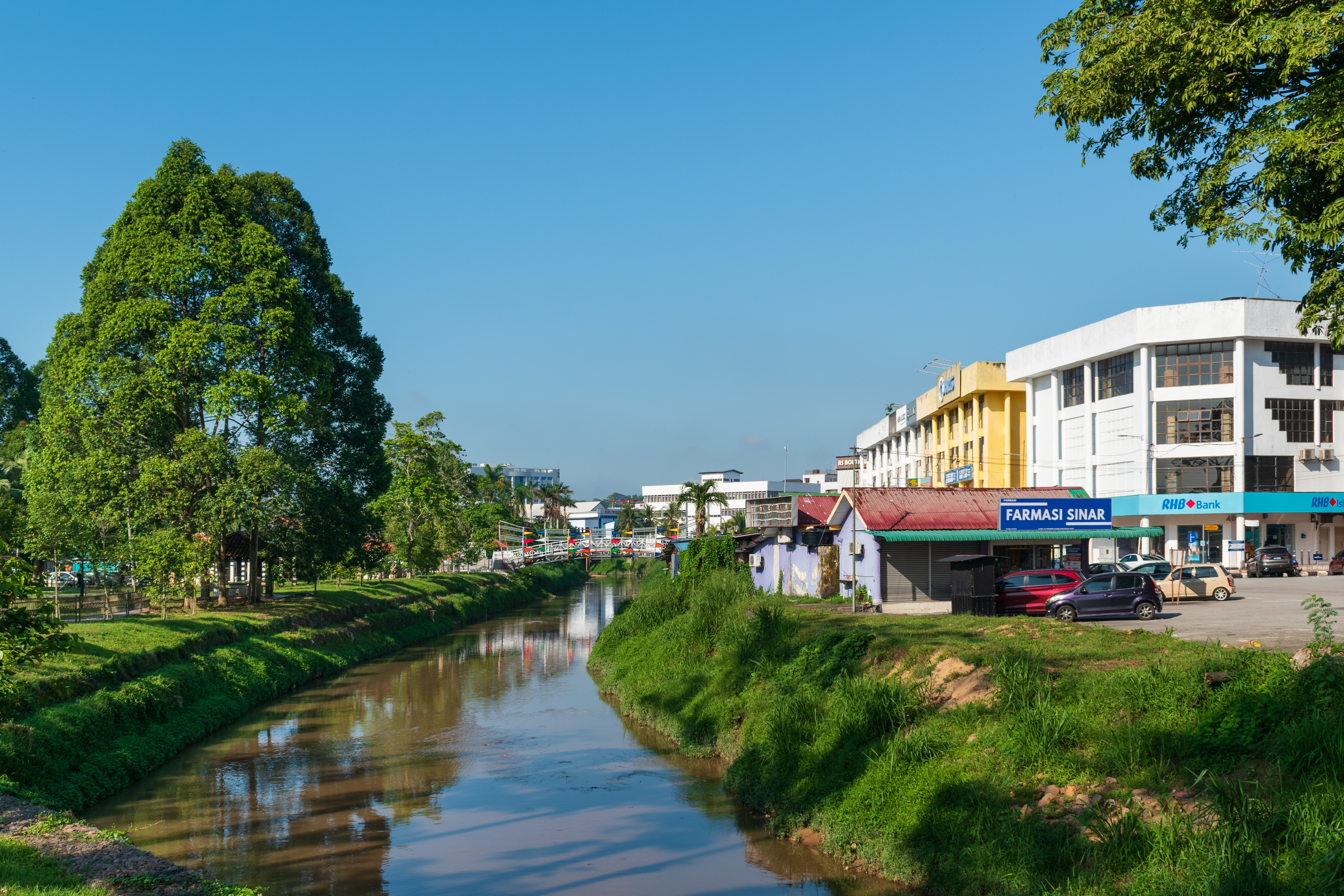
View of Mengkibol River from Jalan Sultanah, Kluang

The Mengkibol River (Malay: Sungai Mengkibol) is a small river in town of Kluang in the state of Johor, Malaysia. It is one of the tributaries of the Endau River. Due to construction and development along the banks of the river in the 21st century, the risk of flooding has increased in the town of Kluang.

== See also ==
- Geography of Malaysia
