= English College Johore Bahru =

Coordinates: 1°27′48.1″N 103°44′22.0″E

English College Johore Bahru (EC)
- Maktab Sultan Abu Bakar (MSAB)
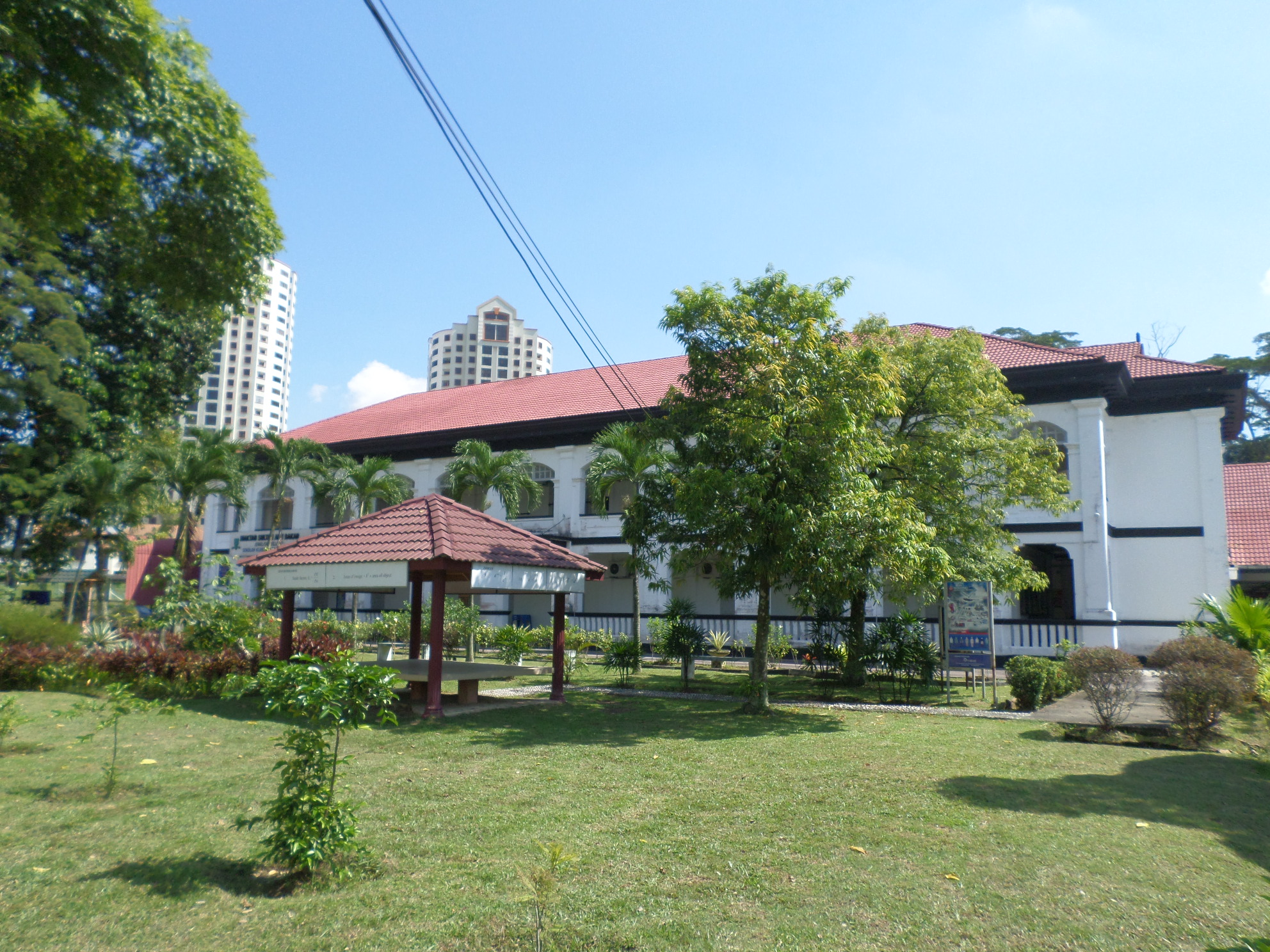

Location
- Jalan Sungai Chat; 80100 Johor Bahru; Johor; Malaysia

Information
- Type: Government, cluster
- Established: 21 March 1914; 112 years ago
- Founder: Sultan Sir Abu Bakar of Johor (21st Sultan of Johor)
- School district: Johor Bahru
- Principal: Tuan Haji Abdul Razak Bin Abdul Samad
- Grades: Form 1 - 6
- Gender: Male students (Male and Female students for Lower and Upper Form 6)
- Enrollment: 877 (as of Jan 2024)
- Classes: Akas, Bestari, Cendekia, Dinamik, Etika, Fatan and Gigih
- Language: English, Malay
- Houses: Drury (blue) [never say die] Treusein (red) [true to the colour] Lowe (yellow) [labour conquers all] Grundy (green) [grit and grace]
- Colours: Yellow, green
- Yearbook: Seri Budiman Magazine
- Website: msabjb.com

The English College Johore Bahru, also known as Maktab Sultan Abu Bakar, is a secondary school in Johor Bahru, Malaysia. The school is under the royal patronage of the Sultanate of Johor, and it has been awarded the status of Cluster School of Excellence by the Ministry of Education (Malaysia). The school is one of the ten oldest English institutions in Malaysia and the oldest school in Johor.

== History ==
=== Beginning ===
English College was established on 21 March 1914, with 21 students selected from Bukit Zaharah School. The school was initially located close to the Sungai Chat Palace facing the Lido Beach in Johor Bahru. Remains of the former school site, some stone blocks and steps, can still be seen on the site that is now the M Suite Hotel, while the campus of vocational studies has been replaced by the old Royal Malaysian Customs of Johore. The 21 students were placed under the tutelage of two teachers brought over from England, Morrison and Holman. These 21 students can be regarded as the pioneers, and from this beginning EC became an educational institution in Johor Bahru.

The education system of the EC was based on that of the English public school and it adopted the British syllabus, and EC later became a model for other English medium schools in Johor. The teachers of the school were initially recruited from Europe, although later locally trained teachers were used to teach Malay subjects.

After end of World War I in 1918, the EC held for the first time its Junior Cambridge examinations, later followed by Senior Cambridge examinations. However, the results for both examinations were poor, and as a consequence the school was closed temporarily in 1928 for reassessment. It reopened in May of the same year, and after remedial actions had been taken by the school administration, the school met its target at the end of 1928. 143 students were selected to study Mathematics, Science and English. Also in 1928, T. Drury, who had been in the Education Service of Malaya since 1921, was appointed the principal of EC.

=== Relocation ===
At the end of 1930, the school moved to its present location at Jalan Sungei Chat. The new EC was officially opened in early 1931, and the school has since produced many outstanding students. One of its most famous students are Tun Musa Hitam, the Deputy Prime Minister.

Some of the notable teachers there were Pendeta Za'Ba, T. Drury, T. Grundy, Mr Bion Dury, Hj. Zulkipli Bin Hj. Mahmod, Victor Joshua Jeyaretnam (father of J. B. Jeyaretnam) and Mohamad Bin Iskandar (father of former prime minister Mahathir Mohamad).

During the Japanese occupation of Malaya from 1941 to 1945, the EC was used as a military base, a factory, a military hospital, as well as a prison camp by the Japanese. The school reopened in early 1946 after the end of Japanese occupation. H. L. Hill was appointed the Headmaster of EC, and under his leadership, the EC returned to its status of a prestigious school. In 1949, with the admission of the first group of girl students, the EC became co-ed for a brief period before returning to its all-boys configuration. Today its Form 6 programmes are co-ed.

=== After Malayan independence ===
In 1965, following the end of the British rule in Malaya, the school was given a new name in Malay, 'Maktab Sultan Abu Bakar' (MSAB), after Sultan Sir Abu Bakar of Johor who was the Father of Modern Johore. More local teachers were employed to teach at the school. In 1961, the school badge and uniforms were introduced for the first time. This was followed by creation of the school song with lyrics written by Yusof bin Karto set to music by Lim Teck Siang.

In 1974, EC celebrated its Diamond Jubilee, and all the former students were invited to the celebration. Also in 1974, the first batch of students of Sekolah Menengah Sains Johor was placed temporarily in the English College until the completion of the school's building in the month of April 1974.

During the 1980s and 1990s, the school was further enlarged, and facilities were added for student's use in accordance with the requirements of Ministry of Education and the introduction of Integrated Secondary School Curriculum.

In 2005 EC recorded the best PMR performance for Johor Bahru when three EC students were selected as national top PMR candidates, namely Joshua Soo Iyn Zhou, Mukeshakumar and Wong Guo Wai and Yong Jenn. EC was confirmed by the Ministry of Education as a Premier school. In 2007, the company won the award for Excellent Crew EC Best Company and Best Service in Young Entrepreneurs Convention 11th. PMR 2007 once again recorded excellent results when an EC students selected as outstanding PMR Johor.

On 5 May 2009, the English College was officially selected by the Ministry of Education as a Cluster School of Excellence. EC was selected based on its excellence in various aspects such as the achievement of excellence in the Paralympic Games, excellence in mathematics in the PMR and SPM, excellence in orchestra and rugby team as well as the various programs organised by EC, for example the creation of the Visual Arts Gallery EC.

The college celebrated its centenary on 21 March, an event attended by dignitaries, old boys, and townspeople. Among the attendees were the Sultan of Johor, Sultan Ibrahim Al-Marhum Sultan Iskandar, along with Minister of Johor, Tan Sri Khaled Nordin as well as notable alumni and other old boys and former students of the English College. On this day, a handwritten letter Royal Professor Ungku Aziz Ungku Abd Hamid was read by his daughter Zeti Akhtar Aziz. Centenary Celebration Dinner took place at the school field and was attended by all the old boys and old staff, with performances from Datuk Sheikh Abdullah Ahmad, Ajai, Ayai Illusi and Rahmat Mega, who are also old boys of the college.

== Buildings ==
The first building was at Bukit Zaharah Palace in 1914. The Western architectural features can be seen in the use of classical Ionic columns, decorative plasters for the outer walls and interiors of the building and decorative glass above the windows and doors of keystone shape. Similar to other Western architectural features, the windows of this building are of segmental shape. The second school building was initially located close to the Sungai Chat Palace facing the Lido Beach in Johor Bahru. Remains of the former school site can still be seen but on the site is now the M Suite Hotel. The most recognisable feature of the school is The New School (built in 1930), a building with pseudo English Classic Victorian architecture once be a Malay Teacher Training College at Johore Bahru and later on change into the famous English College Johore Bahru in 1931. The school is built to accommodate 300 students initially. Thus, the planning for the construction of the East Wing was considered. The block was completed by 1931 when it took in its first nucleus student. The school compound was enlarged, and a sports complex and a library was constructed. In 2001, an engineering block and a mini auditorium were completed. Furthermore, Seri Budiman Hall was completed and set to be a most advance hall in Malaysia on the year of 1950. On 2008, the Tunku Mahkota of Johor, Tunku Ibrahim Ismail, son of HRH Sultan Iskandar consented to the launching ceremony for the construction of the hall that was named as Sultan Iskandar Hall.

== Sports ==
The school has three sport fields. One is in front of the Johor Darul Takzim F.C exercise field, reserved for rugby. The second field is in front of the New School reserved for soccer. The third open space is in front of the Sultan Iskandar Hall reserved for cricket, baseball, and hockey practice, and it is used for various purposes and competitions. In 2012, The Pavilion suitable for various purposes was completed along with the seatings at the school field. On 2013, The College set to be a first school that has a paintball field in Malaysia.

The school excels in sports and Olympiad events. It became a powerhouse in rugby during the 1950s and still has one of the best rugby school teams in the Johore. Nicknamed "Stingboks" after the Springboks for its all yellow and green strip, they perform the haka before matches. It has held a match series against Singapore elite schools since 1960. In odd-numbered years, the match is held in Seri Gelam Field (Home of English College Rugby Team). In addition to this, EC competes with rival Royal Military College, Malay College Kuala Kangsar, Sultan Abdul Hamid College, Sultan Ismail College and Tanjung Puteri Vocational College every year in a multi-games carnival.

Other than rugby, EC has excelled in sports such as soccer, hockey, athletics, chess, cricket, basketball, and bowling. English College Football Club was a powerhouse in Johore during the 1950s and 1960s, meanwhile English College Bowling Team has produced two of the best national players in Malaysia, one of whom was entered in Sukma Games. English College has produced some of the best and most talented national players of any sport in the country.

The Annual College Sports Day always held at Ruggers Field. In 1990, The Annual English College Sports Day start held at Larkin Stadium. In 2013, English College decided that The Annual Sports Day held at school field for the first time since 1981.

== Notable alumni ==
The college have educated two Sultans of Johor (both became the Yang di-Pertuan Agong), two Deputy Prime Minister of Malaysia, 3 Menteri Besar of Johor, a Speaker of the Dewan Rakyat, a Chief Secretary of Malaysia, two presidents of major political parties in two countries (Malaysia and Singapore), a Leader of Opposition in Malaysia, a Leader of Opposition in Singapore, several national and state's rugby players. The first Regius Professor in Malaysia (Ungku Abdul Aziz) and one of Asia's richest man received their education here. Two Commander of The Malaysian Armed Forces also gained their education in the college. More recently, an alumnus of the college was appointed by His Majesty DYMM Sultan Ibrahim the King of Malaysia as a High Court judge. Justice Gan Techiong was born in Johor Bahru on 11th December 1965, and was a student at the college from 1978 to 1982.

The alumni association of EC is known as the English College Old Boys Association (ECOBA) was established in 1939 and change into English College Ex Student Association (ECESA) in the 1960s due to accepted girls student for form six intake. The alumni association is based in the management of ECESA at Sultan Iskandar Hall English College in Johore Bahru.

== Transportation ==
The school is accessible by Muafakat Bus route P-101, Jalan Sungai Chat 02 station.
