= Ng Tian Hann =

Malaysian Chinese movie director (born 1969)

Ng Tian Hann (Chinese: 黃天漢; pinyin: Huáng Tiānhàn; Pe̍h-ōe-jī: N̂g Thian-hàn; born 1 January 1969, Kluang, Johor) is a Malaysian Chinese movie director. He graduated from National Taiwan University with a bachelor's degree in literature and drama in the mid-1990s. Aside from his film work, he organises and judges film events.

== Works ==
=== First Take, Final Cut ===
The award-winning satirical comedy First Take, Final Cut (Chinese: 高深莫测) was released in Malaysia on 21 October 2004. It was produced in DV. Ng financed the film by getting a cash advance on his credit card. It won a bronze award at the 2003 Malaysian Video Awards for Best Asean Features and was also invited to the Singapore International Film Festival and the 27th Asian American International Film Festival in New York. With Mandarin and Cantonese dialogue, it portrays Chai (Tony Ong), an aimless youth trying to become a film director, who finds himself in over his head when he has to make an art film in less than three weeks to prepare for an upcoming festival.

=== Nodding Scoop ===
Nodding Scoop, another DV film, was included in Lina Tan's Visits: The Hungry Ghost Anthology. It was featured in major international film festivals, including the Tokyo International Film Festival and the International Film Festival Rotterdam. Starring Tony Ong, Wu Bin Yan, and Wong Sze Zen, it tells the story of three friends who attempt to film themselves summoning the dead. The two girls end up squabbling, while the guy runs away and leaves the girls to fend for themselves when things start to get spooky.
