= School uniforms in Malaysia =

In Malaysia, school uniforms are compulsory for all students who attend public schools. School uniforms are almost universal in the public and private school systems. Western-style school uniforms were first introduced to Malaysia in the 19th century. Since 1970, uniforms have been made compulsory for all students throughout the whole country.

For public schools, uniforms are almost completely standardised throughout the country, with the only differentiating factor being the school badge.

Private schools usually have a wider range of school uniform designs.

== Public schools Uniform ==
Overview

		Shirt	Pants / Cloth	Shoes
Male	Primary School	White short/long sleeve shirt	Navy blue long trousers or Navy blue short trousers	Black shoes or white shoes
Male	Secondary School	White short/long sleeve shirt	Olive green long trousers	Black shoes or white shoes
Male	Prefects	White long sleeve shirt	White trousers or dark blue trousers	Black shoes
Male	Prefects	Blue long sleeve shirt	Black or dark blue long trousers	Black shoes
Female	Primary School	White Baju Kurung long sleeve	Dark Blue Cloth & White Headscarf (Muslim Students); Long Navy Blue Skirt	Black shoes or white shoes
Female	Primary School	White short sleeve shirt	Navy Blue Pinafore (over white shirt) (Non-Muslim Students)	Black shoes or white shoes
Female	Secondary School	White Baju Kurung long sleeve	Light Blue Fabric & White Scarf (Muslim Students); Long Turquoise Skirt	Black shoes or white shoes
Female	Secondary School	White short sleeve shirt	Turquoise Pinafore (on white shirt) (Non-Muslim Students)	Black shoes or white shoes
Female	Prefects	Blue Baju Kurung long sleeve	Black or dark blue fabric	Black shoes
Female	Prefects	White blouse	Navy Blue Skirt (Primary School) Turquoise Skirt (Secondary School) (Non-Muslim Students)	Black shoes

=== Accessories ===
The Prefects uniform is on the school's own instructions. For Sekolah Berasrama Penuh (SBP) and Sekolah Menengah Teknik and Kolej Vokasional, it may be slightly different from the dress code above. MARA Junior Science College (MRSM) has its own dress code.

In addition to these, schools usually have their own school badges which must be sewn or ironed on to the uniform - generally at the left chest. Some schools also require students to sew their name tags in addition to the school badge. For upper forms, students generally have to wear a school-specific tie, except those who are wearing the baju kurung.

Public schools also have their own authority to set special school uniforms for prefects, class monitors, librarians and as such, there are many varieties of them depending on schools. Neckties are hence often worn by prefects, class monitors, librarians, and other students of rank. However, some schools have neckties as standard issue, but even so, the neckties are generally reserved for school or public events, and are not part of the everyday school uniform.

Effective 21 April 2025, uniforms for all public schools must have the national flag sewn on the right chest as a badge. The flag must measure 5cm in length and 2.5cm wide, and it should not be altered in any way. Additionally, the badge must be replaced if faded or worn-out. This also applies to other attires such as that for sports, extra-curricular activities, and vocational college corporate shirts. According to the Ministry of Education, this policy is intended to promote patriotism, unity, discipline and responsibility. These flag badges will be provided free of charge.

=== School Rules ===
Besides the uniform, the hairstyle of students is also given attention by schools. For boys, there is usually a maximum length of hair allowed, for example, the hair must be a few centimetres above the collar, and no sideburns are allowed. For girls with long hair, their hair must be properly tied up, often into a ponytail. Some schools would even prohibit girls from having long hair.

In order to prevent excessive hairdressing, the colour and type of hair accessories that can be used is also restricted. The use of hair gel is prohibited in some of the stricter schools. Wearing make up and hair colouring in school is also prohibited.

Violation of hair regulations are often punished with a caning but some schools alternatively enforce an in-school haircut.

Schools usually enforce their school uniform code thoroughly, with regular checks by teachers and prefects. Students who fail to comply may be warned, given demerit points, publicly punished, sent home from school, or caned.

=== Girls ===
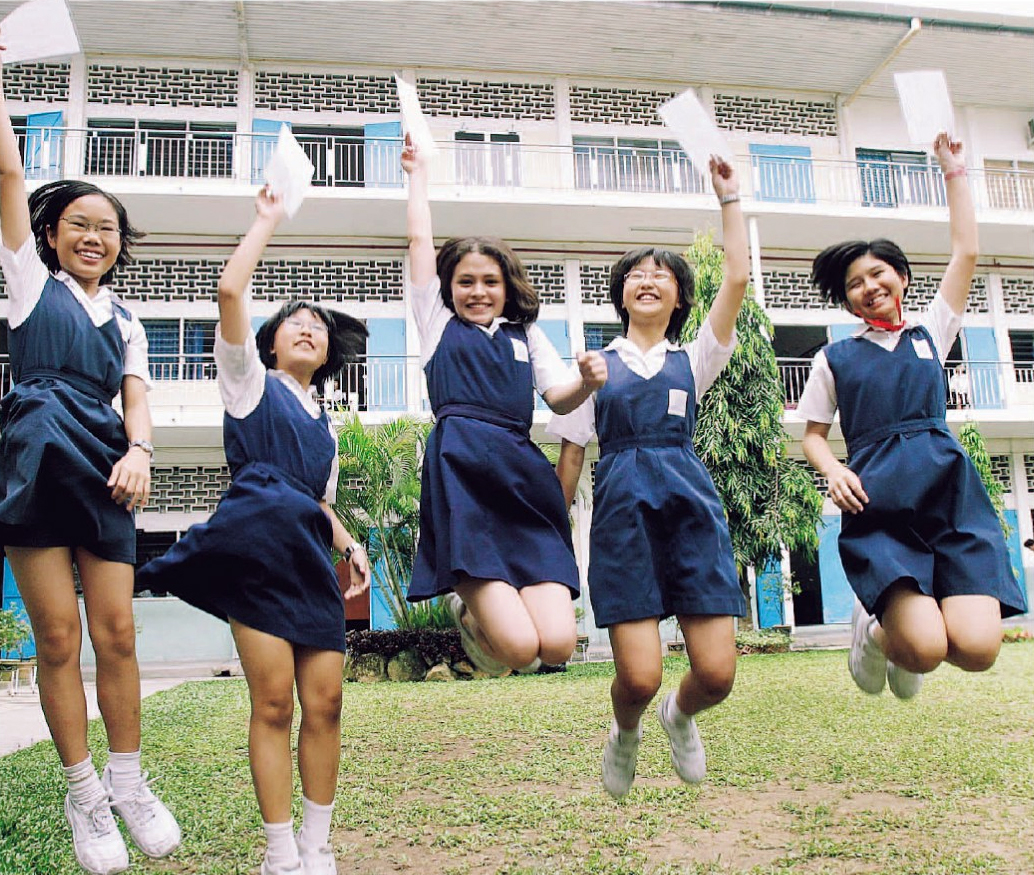
Malaysian primary school girls in their navy blue pinafores.

Girls who wear the uniform with the knee-length pinafore or skirt, especially those attending co-ed schools, usually wear shorts under their pinafore to allow for carefree movement. Those who wear the baju kurung tend not to wear shorts as their long skirt already covers their legs. For modesty reasons as well, most schools require female students who wear the baju kurung to wear a plain-coloured camisole underneath.

Muslim girls are usually required to wear the baju kurung. Most of them start wearing a white tudung (Malaysian version of the Muslim headscarf or hijab) upon entering secondary school, for religious and modesty reasons. In contrast, non-muslim girls usually wear pinafores.

=== Boys ===
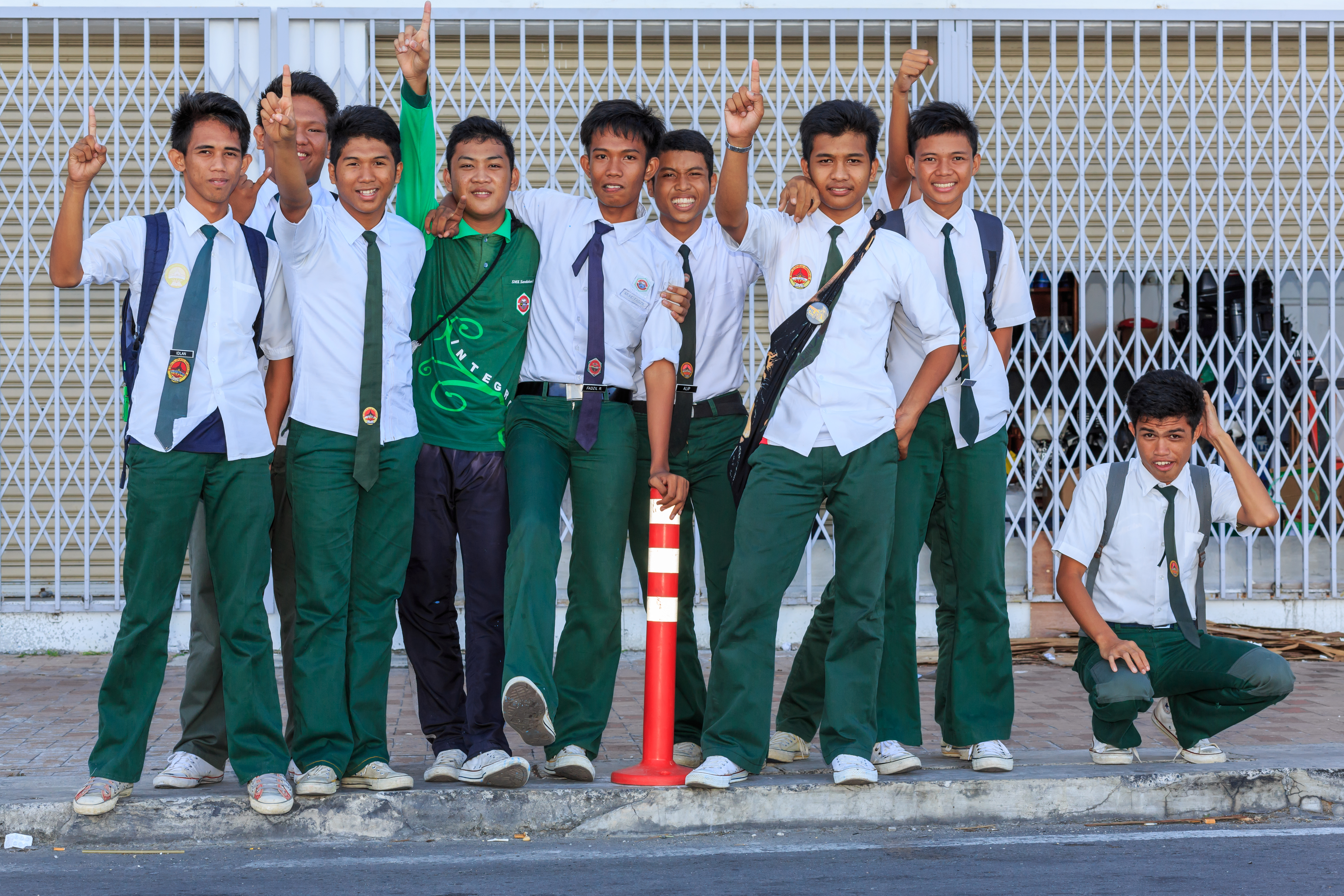
A group of Malaysian secondary school boys in their uniform.

In recent times it has become more common for Muslim boys to wear long trousers, especially at secondary level. Chinese or Indian boys still wear short trousers at primary level and in the first couple of years of secondary at some schools.

Muslim boys may wear Baju Melayu at school on Fridays, often with a songkok hat, so as to be dressed for lunchtime prayers at the mosque.

Many schools and their co-curricular uniformed societies require male students to wear a plain white singlet (tank top undershirt) beneath their shirts for general decency.

== Sports uniform ==
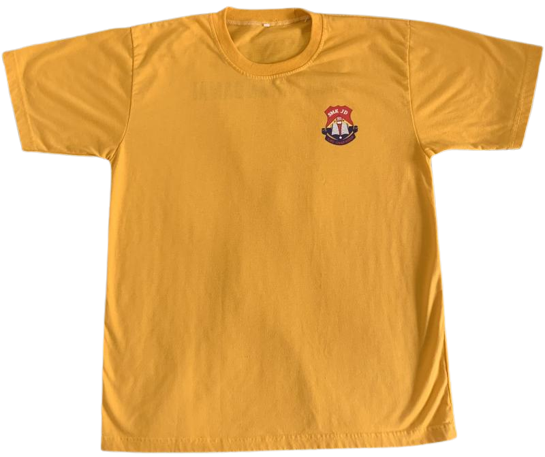
A yellow sports uniform from SMK Jalan Damai

Every school has its own sports uniform which it is free to design on its own. Some schools have opted for a non-collar design while others have a collared design.

The sports uniform usually has the school's logo on the front of the shirt and an abbreviation of the school's name on the pants.

Most schools have their respective sports houses which are usually red, green, blue and yellow (or a combination of other colours) and the sports uniform will be made with those colours.

== Co-curricular uniforms ==
Every public school has a time allocated to co-curricular activities and students are required to wear their co-curricular uniforms on that day.

The uniforms usually consists of a "full uniform" where students have to wear a buttoned shirt with uniform pants and all the required accessories and a "half uniform" where students are allowed to wear a t-shirt and the uniform pants.

== Private schools ==
Private primary schools generally have uniforms identical to those of the public system. Most private secondary schools, however, have their own school uniform. Today, many private schools have their students wear polo shirts in the school colours, and girls wear skirts instead of pinafores. The "baju kurung" is also accepted.

For Chinese independent high schools, uniform designs may vary greatly, especially for those of female students. Some, such as Chong Hwa Independent High School, are similar to the public school standard, with girls wearing white shirts and pinafores; others such as Chung Ling Private High School adopts shirts and skirts, while a few, such as Shen Jai High School [zh], uses a design similar to the Japanese school uniform.

== Kindergarten ==
There is no set uniform in kindergartens as they are privately owned. Each kindergarten might have different uniforms or allow free choice of clothing. The uniform in most Malaysian kindergartens is the sailor uniform. These schools also tend to have a sports uniform. The remainder have uniforms identical to that of the public primary school uniform.

== See also ==
- Schoolgirl uniform fetish
- Japanese school uniform
