= Mount Banang =

Mountain in Malaysia

Coordinates: 1°48′52.0″N 102°56′25.9″E

Mount Banang (Malay: Gunung Banang) is a mountain in Batu Pahat District, Johor, Malaysia.

It is famous and have been made into song and has also appeared in movies made by Malay Film Production Limited.

== See also ==
- Geography of Malaysia
