= Mount Lambak =

Inselberg in Johor, Malaysia

Coordinates: 2°02′N 103°21′E

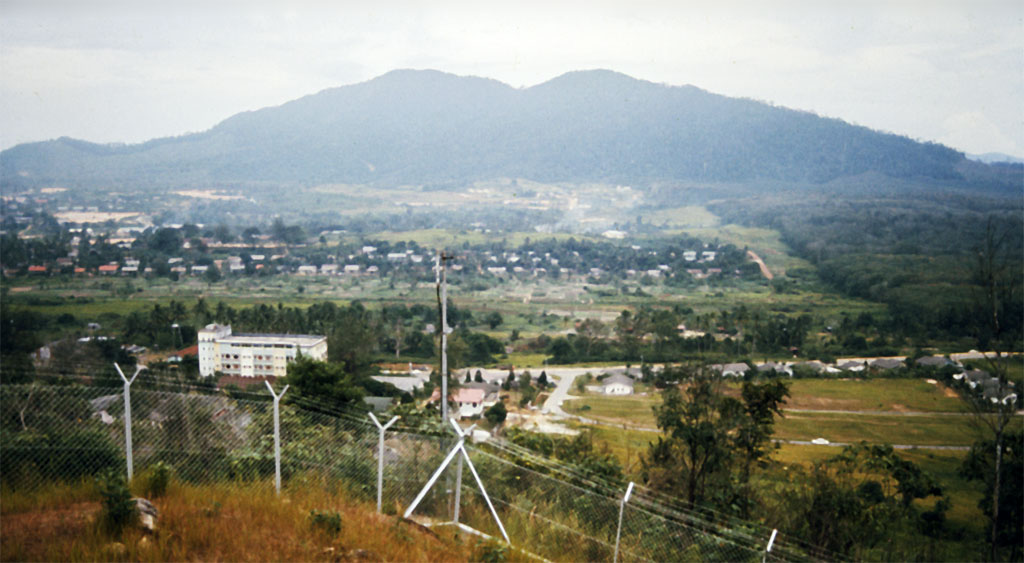
- Gunung Lambak from the west, looking across the southern suburbs of Kluang, 1975

Highest point
- Elevation: 510 m (1,670 ft)

Naming
- Native name: Gunung Lambak

Geography
- Location within Malaysia
- Location: Kluang District, Johor

Geology
- Mountain type: Inselberg

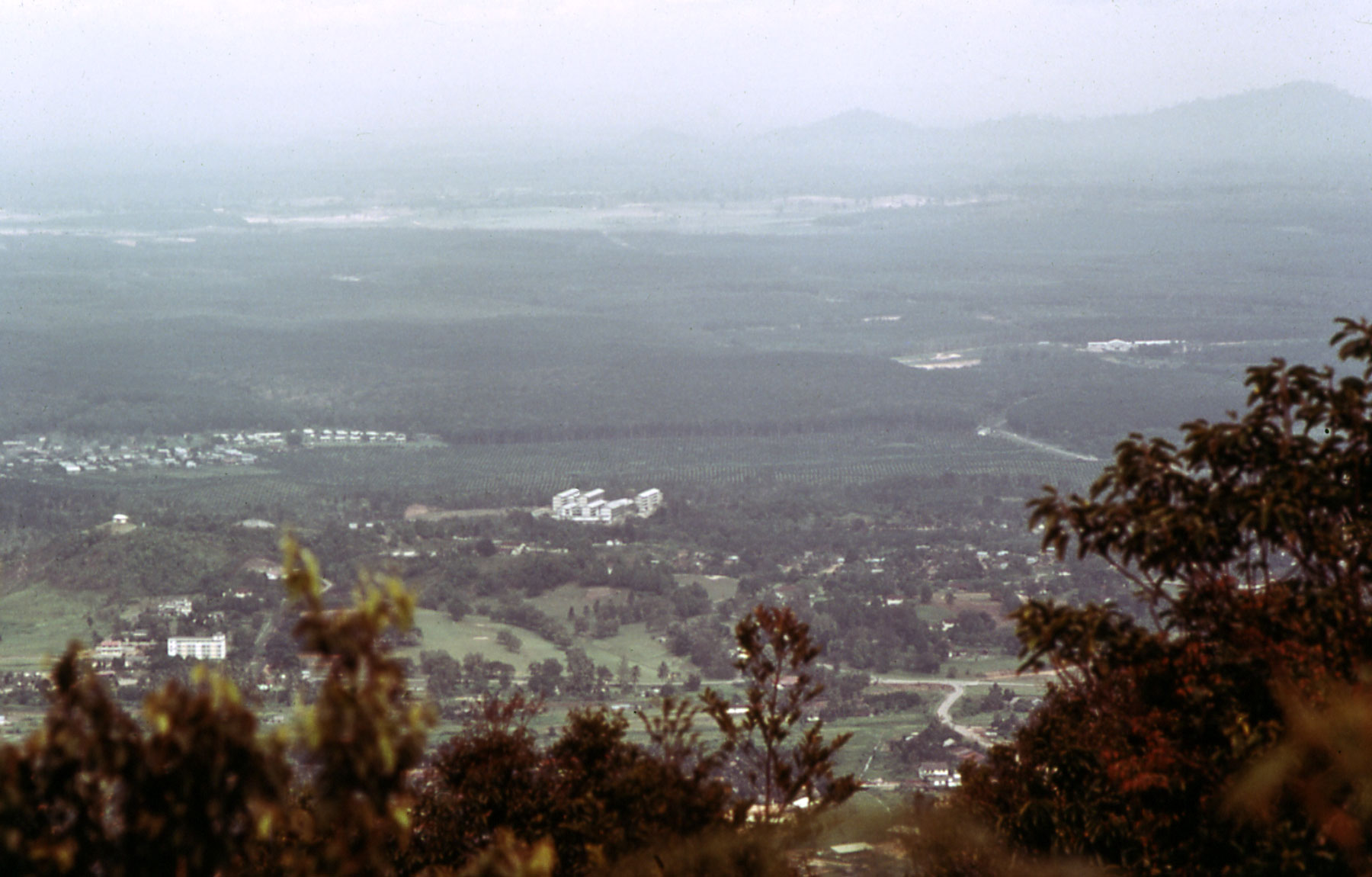
View from Gunung Lambak looking west, 1975

'Mount Lambak (Malay: Gunung Lambak meaning Flea Mountain') is an inselberg in Kluang District, Johor, Malaysia. The summit is 510 m above sea level.

Gunung Lambak is the Hausberg of Kluang.

== Mount Lambak Recreational Forest ==
It has been developed as a recreational and tourist attraction called Mount Lambak Recreational Forest. Pathways and wooden bridges make it relatively easy to climb to the summit, and a picnic spot at the base of the mountain has car parking, benches, a small children's playground and toilets. There is also chalet accommodation, camping facilities and a swimming pool.

Mammals found on Gunung Lambak include the Long-tailed macaque, Pig-tailed macaque and Dusky leaf monkey.

== Broadcasting mast ==
The television station RTM completed a transmitter on Gunung Lambak in 1969 to provide good reception in Kluang. It closed in 1983, superseded by a transmitter at Mount Ledang in Tangkak District. The mast still stands at the summit of Gunung Lambak.

== See also ==
- Geography of Malaysia
