= Mount Belumut =

Mountain in Malaysia

Coordinates: 2°2′42.6″N 103°33′41.9″E

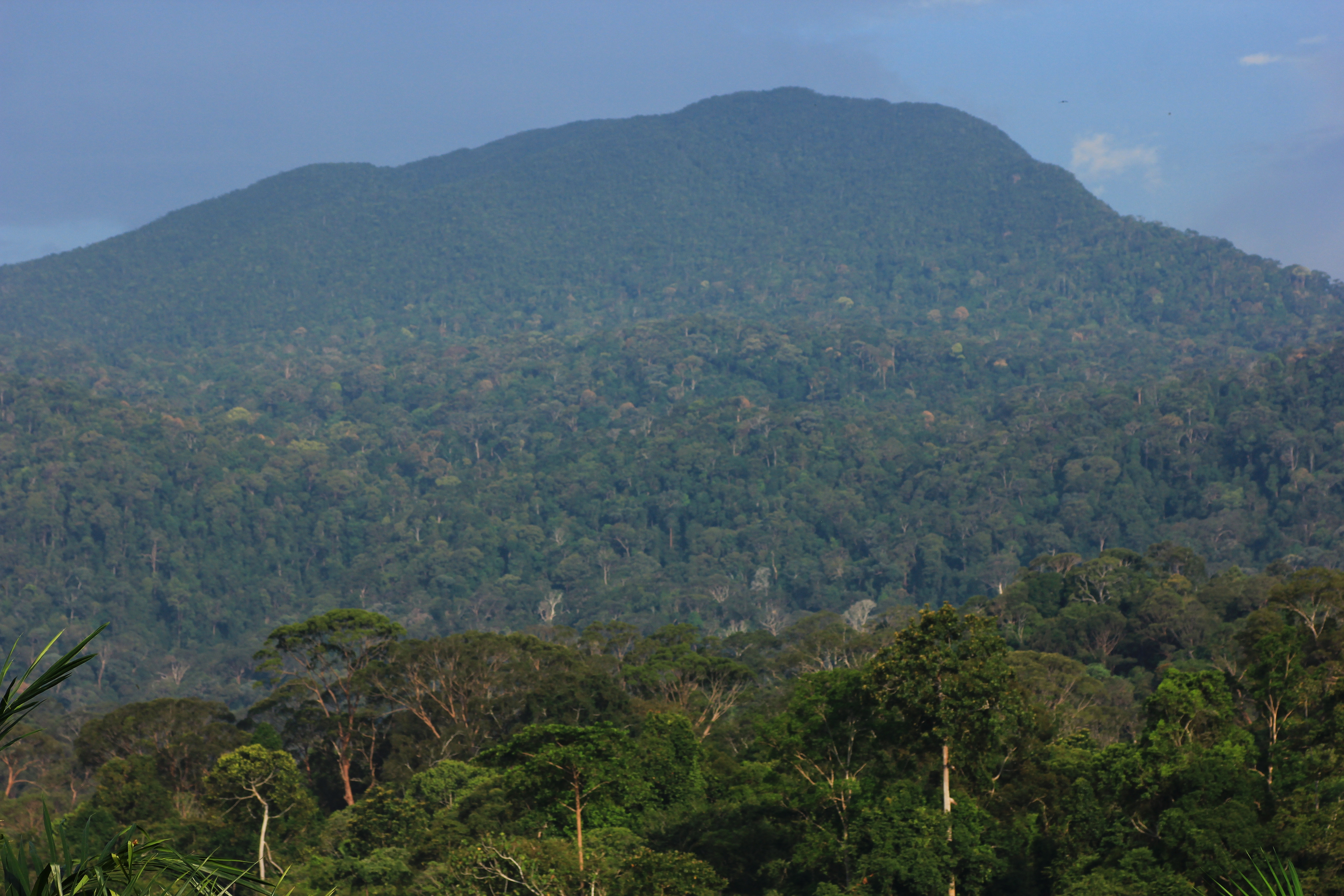
- Mount Belumut

Highest point
- Elevation: 1,010 m (3,310 ft)
- Prominence: 975 m (3,199 ft)
- Listing: Mountains of Malaysia

Naming
- Native name: Gunung Belumut (Malay)

Geography
- Location within Malaysia
- Country: Malaysia
- State: Johor
- District: Kluang District
- Protected area: Mount Belumut Recreational Forest

Climbing
- Easiest route: Ulu Dengar Route

Mount Belumut (Malay: Gunung Belumut), or known locally as Gunung Lumut (lit. 'mossy mountain' in Malay), standing at 1,010 metres (3,314 ft), is a mountain located in Mount Belumut Recreational Forest in Kluang District, Johor, Malaysia, located within a massif north of Linggiu Reservoir. It is the third tallest peak in Johor.

== Hiking ==
For the average climber, the climb to the summit takes four to six hours and the return to the foot (by the same route) takes three to four hours.

Before reaching the summit of Gunung Belumut, climbers will first pass by a 'false summit', where overnight camping is possible in fair weather conditions. From the 'false summit', it's about half-an-hour's trek to the summit. A huge boulder, named the Crown Rock, sits on the summit. The boulder got its name because it looks like a giant crown.

=== Transportation ===
To get to Gunung Belumut, one has to get to Kluang, and take a cab from the bus terminal to Belumut.

== Gallery ==
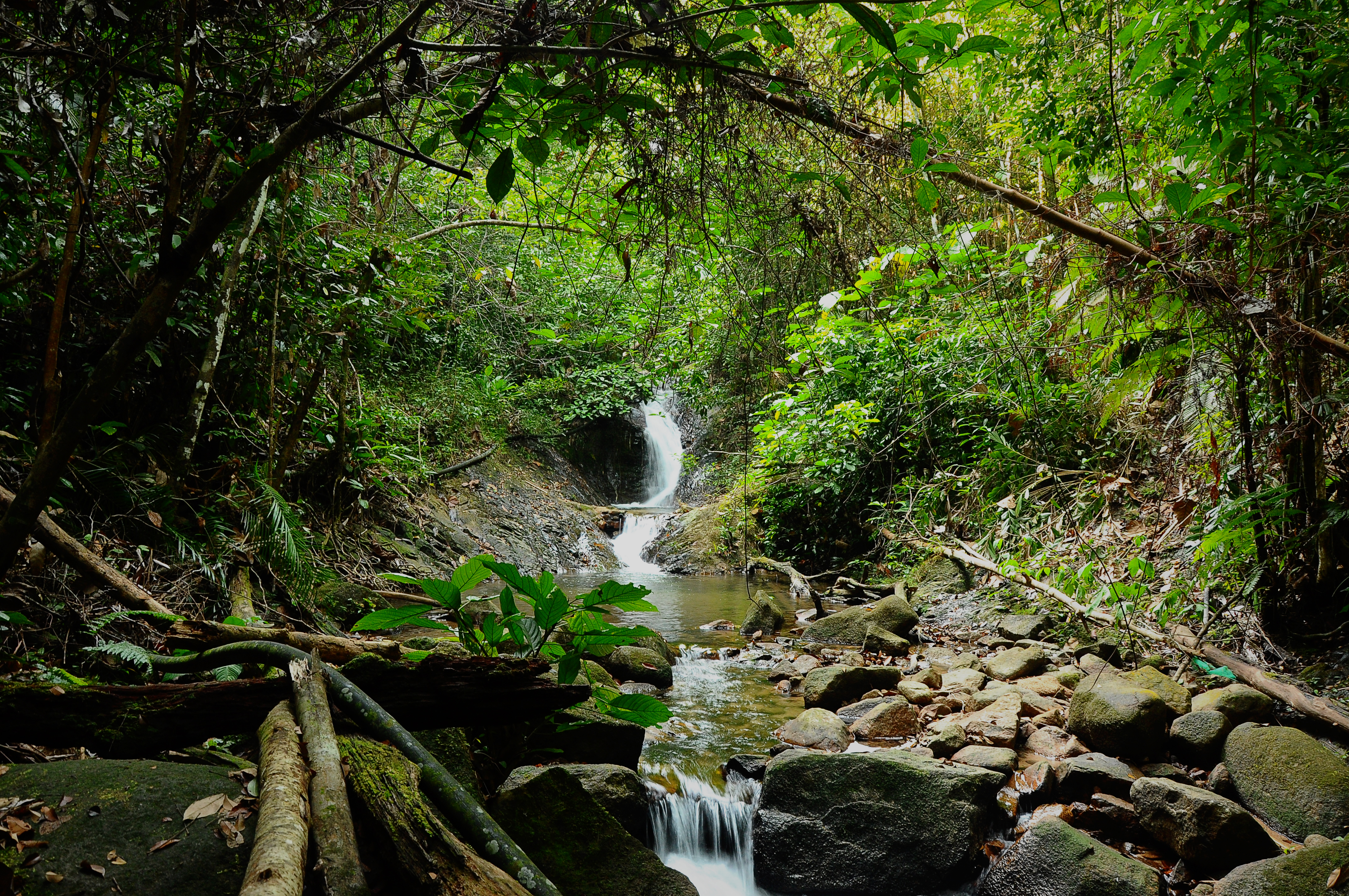
Waterfall in Mount Belumut.

Entrance to the mountain.

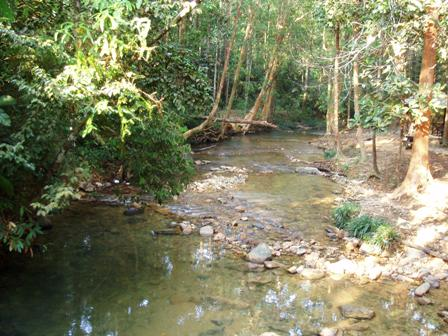
Stream at the foot of the mountain.

View from summit

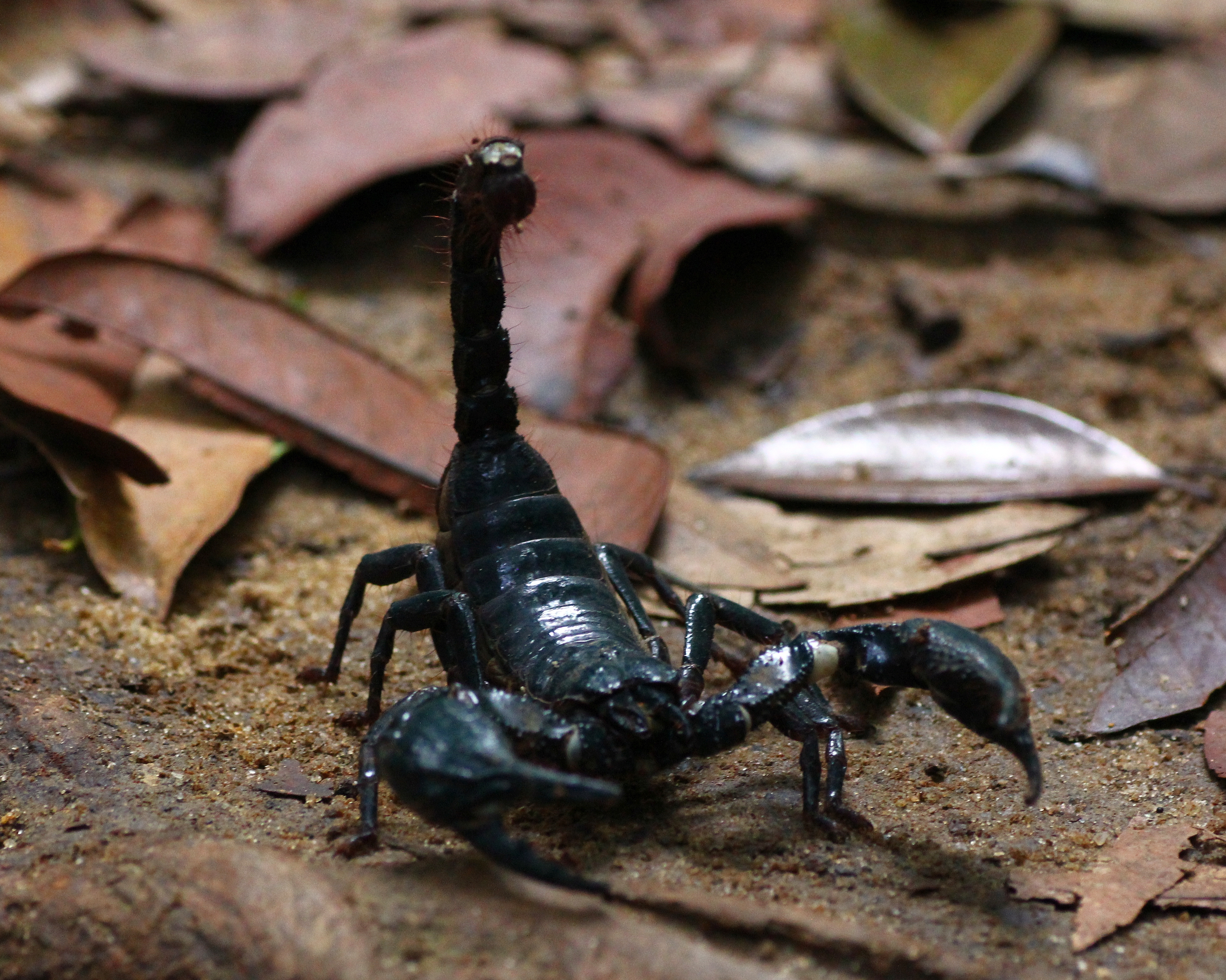
Scorpion along the trail

== See also ==
- Protected areas of Johor
