= List of Malay College Kuala Kangsar alumni =

This is the list of Malay College Kuala Kangsar Alumni.

== Royalty ==
- Tuanku Abdul Rahman - The first Yang di-Pertuan Agong & the second Yang di-Pertuan Besar of Negeri Sembilan
- Sultan Hisamuddin Alam Shah - The second Yang di-Pertuan Agong & the 5th Sultan of Selangor
- Sultan Ismail Nasiruddin Shah - The 4th Yang di-Pertuan Agong & the 15th Sultan of Terengganu, the father of Modern Malaysian Photography
- Sultan Ahmad Shah - The 7th Yang di-Pertuan Agong & the 34th Sultan of Pahang
- Sultan Azlan Shah - The 9th Yang di-Pertuan Agong & the 34th Sultan of Perak, the fifth Lord President of the Supreme Court
- Tuanku Jaafar - The 10th Yang di-Pertuan Agong & the 10th Yang di-Pertuan Besar of Negeri Sembilan
- Sultan Salahuddin Abdul Aziz Shah - The 11th Yang di-Pertuan Agong & the 8th Sultan of Selangor
- Tuanku Munawir - The 9th Yang di-Pertuan Besar of Negeri Sembilan
- Sultan Ismail - The 21st Sultan of Johor
- Sultan Abdul Aziz Shah - 31st Sultan of Perak
- Sultan Yusuff Izzuddin Shah - The 32nd Sultan of Perak
- Sultan Idris Iskandar Shah - The 33rd Sultan of Perak
- Sultan Omar Ali Saifuddien III - The 28th Sultan of Brunei

== Titular heads ==
- Abdul Aziz Abdul Majid - the third Yang di-Pertua Negeri of Malacca & the first Chief Secretary to the Government
- Mohd Khalil Yaakob - The 6th Yang di-Pertua Negeri of Malacca & the 13th Menteri Besar of Pahang
- Raja Uda Raja Muhammad - The first Yang di-Pertua Negeri of Penang, the first High Commissioner of Malaya to the United Kingdom & the second Speaker of the Federal Legislative Council
- Shahmaruddin Abdul Rahman - The 13th Undang Luak Jelebu of Negeri Sembilan
- Dato' Muhammad Abdullah - The 15th Undang Luak Johol of Negeri Sembilan

== Politics ==
- Anwar Ibrahim - The current Prime Minister of Malaysia, the president of People's Justice Party & the chairman of the ruling Pakatan Harapan (PH) coalition
- Abdul Razak Hussein - The second prime minister of Malaysia
- Onn Jaafar - KBE; The 7th Menteri Besar of Johor & the founder of United Malays National Organisation (UMNO), father of Malay nationalism
- Abdul Wahab Abdul Aziz - The first Menteri Besar of Perak
- Mahmud Mat - The first Menteri Besar of Pahang & the first Speaker of the Federal Legislative Council
- Hamzah Abdullah - The first Menteri Besar of Selangor
- Othman Talib - The first chief minister of Malacca
- Shaari Shafie - The third Menteri Besar of Perak
- Tengku Muhamad Sultan Ahmad - The 4th Menteri Besar of Terengganu & second Menteri Besar of Pahang
- Pengiran Anak Mohamed Alam - The 4th Speaker of the Brunei Legislative Council
- Pengiran Muda Abdul Kahar - chairman of the Tujuh Serangkai committee
- Raja Kamaruddin Idris - The 5th Menteri Besar of Terengganu
- Sanusi Junid - The 7th Menteri Besar of Kedah & the 4th president of International Islamic University Malaysia
- Tengku Razaleigh Hamzah - former Minister of Finance, founding chairman of Petronas & longest serving member of Parliament of Malaysia
- Nik Ahmad Kamil Nik Mahmud - The 11th Menteri Besar of Kelantan, the third High Commissioner of Malaya to the United Kingdom & the 4th Speaker of the Dewan Rakyat
- Wan Mohamed Wan Teh - The 7th Menteri Besar of Perak
- Ramli Ngah Talib - The 9th Governor of Penang, 8th Menteri Besar of Perak & the 7th Speaker of the Dewan Rakyat
- Abu Hassan Omar - The 12th Menteri Besar of Selangor
- Akmal Nasir - Deputy Minister of Ministry of Energy Transition & Water Transformation, member of Parliament for Johor Bahru
- Mohamed Nazri Abdul Aziz - former Minister of Tourism, Arts and Culture, former Malaysian Ambassador to the United States
- Shahrir Abdul Samad - former Minister of Domestic Trade and Consumer Care
- Hishammuddin Hussein - former Minister of Defence
- Rafizi Ramli - member of Parliament for Pandan, founder of INVOKE Malaysia
- Nik Nazmi Nik Ahmad - member of Parliament for Setiawangsa
- Hamzah Abu Samah - former Minister of Trade and Industry, former Minister of Culture, Youth and Sports & seventh President of Asian Football Confederation
- Fauzi Abdul Rahman - chairman of Pahang's Parti Keadilan Rakyat & former Deputy Minister in the Prime Minister's Department

== Civil Service ==
- Abdul Jamil Abdul Rais - the second Chief Secretary to the Government
- Tunku Mohamad Tunku Besar Burhanuddin - the third Chief Secretary to the Government
- Abdullah Mohd Salleh - the 5th Chief Secretary to the Government
- Raja Azam - the second State Secretary of Brunei & 16th State Secretary of Negeri Sembilan

== Law ==
- Azmi Kamaruddin - former Malaysian Federal Court Judge
- Abdull Hamid Embong - former Malaysian Federal Court Judge
- Mohd Nazlan bin Mohd Ghazali - Current Malaysian Court of Appeal Judge
- Mohamed Zaini Bin Mazlan - Current Malaysian Court of Appeal Judge
- Azizul Azmi bin Adnan - Current Malaysian Court of Appeal Judge

== Economy ==
- Tengku Zafrul Aziz - The current Minister of Investment, Trade and Industry
- Yahaya Ahmad - founder of DRB-HICOM
- Hassan Marican - former president & CEO of Petronas
- Saleh Sulong - former chairman of DRB-HICOM
- Halim Saad - former director of United Engineers Malaysia (UEM) & former chairman of Renong
- Ahmad Mohd Don - The fifth governor of Bank Negara Malaysia
- Tunku Abdullah - founder of the Melewar Group Berhad of companies
- Ahmad Tajuddin Ali - Chairman Malakoff, former chairman & former CEO TNB
- Azman Mokhtar - The current chairman of Tabung Haji & former managing director and CEO of Khazanah Nasional
- Wan Zulkiflee Wan Ariffin - The current chairman of Malaysia Airlines & former president and CEO of Petronas
- Amirul Feisal Wan Zahir - The current managing director of Khazanah Nasional
- Raja Arshad Raja Uda - The current chairman of PNB
- Amar Huzaimi Md Deris - The current CEO of Telekom Malaysia
- Khalilur Rahman Ebrahim - Executive Chairman SCS Consultancy Services, Chairman VentureTech
- Rastam Mohd Isa - The current chairman of FGV Holdings
- Megat Jalaluddin Megat Hassan - The current president & CEO of Tenaga Nasional
- Amiruddin Abdul Satar - The current director general of Federal Land Development Authority (FELDA)
- Rohaizad Darus - former director of Sapura Energy
- Ahmad Zulqarnain Onn - CEO of Employees Provident Fund (KWSP) & former CEO of PNB
- Ahmad Shahizam Mohd Shariff - General Partner Mekar Capital, former president & managing director KPJ, former Executive Director IHH Healthcare, former Director Investments Khazanah Nasional
- Zamzamzairani Mohd Isa - The current chairman of Maybank & former CEO of Telekom Malaysia
- Syahrunizam Samsudin - former CEO of Touch N Go
- Shah Hakim @ Shahzanim Zain - former CEO of Scomi Group
- Megat Zaharuddin Megat Mohd Nor - former chairman of Maybank, former chairman of Federal Land Development Authority (FELDA) & former chairman of Maxis Communications
- Ahmad Johari Abdul Razak - The current chairman of the board of Courts Malaysia, the director of Deutsche Bank (Malaysia) & former director of Laura Ashley plc.
- Tengku Ariff Azhar Tengku Mohamed - Deputy Chief Executive Officer of Maybank Investment Bank Berhad

== Architecture ==
- Baharuddin Kassim - Architect of National Mosque of Malaysia, PAM Gold Medal Winner
- Ikmal Hisham Albakri - Renowned Architect, PAM Past President
- Sarly Adre Sarkum - Award Winning Architect, PAM President, MGBC President

== Education ==
- Abdul Wahab Alwi - former director of MARA Training Division (BLM), developer of MARA Junior Science College
- Halim Saad - founder of Kolej Yayasan Saad and Kolej Yayasan UEM
- Dzulkifli Abdul Razak - rector emeritus of International Islamic University Malaysia
- Osman Bakar - rector of International Islamic University Malaysia
- Sir Zakhuan Kasyaf - GUAMSS Teacher Of The Year (TOTY)

== Armed Forces ==
- Raja Aman Shah Raja Harun Al-Rashid - pioneer malayan commanders
- Raja Lope Nor Rashid Raja Abdul Rahman - Royal Malay Regiment, pioneer malayan commanders
- Yazid Ahmad - pioneer malayan commanders
- Mohammed Hanif Omar - the 4th Inspector-General of Police
- Md Hashim Hussein - the 18th Chief of Army
- Yeop Mahidin Mohamed Shariff - MBE; the first director of Rejimen Askar Wataniah - dubbed as "Father of Wataniah"
- Abdul Rahman Mohd Tahir - The Pioneer Director & Provost Marshall of Royal Military Police Corps - dubbed as "Rahman Rimau"

== The arts ==
- Pak Sako or Ishak Haji Muhammad - Author & Malay nationalist
- Raja Ahmad Aminullah - Editor & author
- Suhaimi Sulaiman - Malaysian news anchor, broadcast journalist & media strategist
- Mazlan Nordin - first Chief Editor and chairman of the Malaysian National News Agency (BERNAMA)
- Khairil Ridzwan Annuar a.k.a. Loque - Founding member of the legendary band Butterfingers, and now with Monoloque
- Fakharuddin Bahar a.k.a. Kadax - Bassist, Butterfingers
- Mustapha Maarof - Actor
- Redza Minhat - Actor, model, Chief Rep. London Office Bank Negara Malaysia (BNM) & script writer
- Muzaf Ahmad - Malaysian author
- Hani Mohsin - Actor, model
- Ahmad Fauzi Abdul Samad - Malaysian singer, actor & director
- Rehman Rashid - Malaysian journalist & writer
- Mustaffa Noor - Actor, Theatre Director and Producer

== Others ==
- Syed Danial Syed Ahmad - The 13th Keeper of the Rulers' Seal
- Tunku Annuar - Tunku Bendahara of Kedah
- Razali Ismail - The 51st president of the United Nations General Assembly, chairman of United Nations Security Council
- Tunku Adnan Tunku Besar Burhanuddin - Malaysian Chef de Mission for the Commonwealth Games in 1974, the Asian Games (also in the same year) & Olympic Games in Los Angeles 1984
- Halim Saad - New Straits Times's Chief Executive Officer
- Mohd Fadzillah Kamsah - famous motivational expert
- Mohamed Salleh Mohammad Yasin - director of the International Institute for Global Health (UNU-IIGH
- Kamil Othman - director of FINAS
- Raja Petra Kamarudin - controversial Malaysian editor
- Yusri Mohamad - former president of Yayasan Dakwah Islamiah Malaysia (YADIM) & former president of Muslim Youth Movement of Malaysia (ABIM)
