= Yahaya Ahmad =

Businessman

Yang Berbahagia Tan Sri Yahaya Ahmad PSM SSAP SIMP SSMT SPMT DSAP DPMT
- يحيى بن أحمد
- Born: 11 August 1947; Marang, Terengganu, Malayan Union (now Malaysia)
- Died: 2 March 1997 (aged 49); Kuala Lipis, Pahang, Malaysia
- Education: Malay College Kuala Kangsar; Loughborough University
- Occupation: Businessman
- Known for: Founding chairman of DRB-HICOM
- Title: Chairman of DRB-HICOM, EON Bank
- Spouse: Rohana Othman (m. 1979-1997)
- Children: 4

Yahaya bin Ahmad (11 August 1947 – 2 March 1997) was a Malaysian businessman. He was the founder, chairman and chief executive officer of the DRB-HICOM Group. He was famously known as Malaysia's "Car Czar".

== Early life ==
Yahaya was born on 11 August 1947 in Marang, Terengganu, Malaysia. He received his education from Malay College Kuala Kangsar in Kuala Kangsar, Perak. Yahaya later attended Loughborough University to pursue a degree in automotive engineering. He was married to Puan Sri Rohana Othman on 17 January 1979 and have four children—Yatina, Nadiya, Aman and Faez. They lived in Kelana Jaya, Selangor.

== Career ==
=== DRB-HICOM chairman ===
Yahaya dabbled in the automobile world in 1985 during the launch of Malaysia's first national car Proton Saga by then-Malaysian prime minister Mahathir Mohamad. He was appointed chairman of the DRB-HICOM on 1 January 1994. Through the company, Yahaya managed to capture the national carmaker Proton. In the 1990s the Proton Iswara and Proton Wira was launched. In April 1996, Proton Tiara was launched. Subsequently, in October 1996, Proton and Yahaya took control of British carmaker Lotus in a deal worth £51 million, of which £10 million was funded by Yahaya's personal fortune. Then taken over by the Managing Director Datuk Seri Mohd Nadzmi Salleh with Tengku Tan Sri Mahaleel Tengku Ariff.

In January 1997, two months prior to his death, together with Malaysian finance minister Anwar Ibrahim, as the acting prime minister, introduced an initiative to reduce traffic congestion around the capital city of Kuala Lumpur through the establishment of Intrakota bus (now RapidKL).

=== Other roles ===
Aside from being the DRB-HICOM chairman, Yahaya also appointed as a Chairman of EON Bank on 12 January 1996, succeeding Rin Kei Mei.

He also became the head of the Master Carriage group of companies' boards as well as a board member of Central Terengganu Development Authority and Kemaman Port Authority. Yahaya and his family also owns Mega Consolidated.

Yahaya was also the promoter of Modenas.

== Death ==
On 2 March 1997, Yahaya and his wife Rohana were killed in a helicopter crash near Kuala Lipis, Pahang while on their way to visit his ailing mother, Mandak Omar in Marang, Terengganu. After a mid-air explosion, the six-seater Agusta A109P helicopter plunged 2,900m into rubber trees just metres away from houses in Kampung Along, Jerangsang, about 40 km southwest of Kuala Lipis. The pilot Major (R) Azlizan Abdul Nanas from Batu Pahat, Johor was also killed. The helicopter, belong to Gadek Aviation Helicopter Sdn Bhd, one of DRB-HICOM's companies, was believed to have had engine trouble about 30 minutes after it took off from the Segambut helipad in Kuala Lumpur.

On 4 March 1997, the couple's remains were brought back to his hometown in Marang, Terengganu and were buried in a Muslim cemetery in Marang. After Yahaya's death, the company was taken over by Tan Sri Mohd Saleh Sulong.

== Honours ==
- Malaysia
  - Commander of the Order of Loyalty to the Crown of Malaysia (PSM) – Tan Sri (1996)
- Pahang
  - Knight Grand Companion of the Order of Sultan Ahmad Shah of Pahang (SSAP) – Dato' Sri (1996)
  - Knight Grand Companion of the Order of the Crown of Pahang (SIMP) – Dato' Indera (1994)
  - Knight Companion of the Order of Sultan Ahmad Shah of Pahang (DSAP) – Dato' (1993)
- Terengganu
  - Knight Grand Companion of the Order of Sultan Mahmud I of Terengganu (SSMT) – Dato' Seri (1995)
  - Knight Grand Commander of the Order of the Crown of Terengganu (SPMT) – Dato' (1994)
  - Knight Commander of the Order of the Crown of Terengganu (DPMT) – Dato' (1991)

== Legacy ==
In honour of his contributions to the Malaysian automotive industry, the Mara Skills Institute Pekan (Institut Kemahiran Mara Pekan; IKM Pekan) in Pekan, Pahang was renamed Mara Skills Institute Tan Sri Yahaya Ahmad (Institut Kemahiran Mara Tan Sri Yahaya Ahmad Pekan; IKM TSYA Pekan) on 15 July 1997. A street in Dungun, Terengganu was named after him (Jalan Yahaya Ahmad).
