= Rehman Rashid =

Malaysian journalist and writer

- Born: October 24, 1955; Taiping, Perak
- Died: June 3, 2017 (aged 61); Selayang Hospital, Batu Caves
- Occupations: Writer; Journalist
- Years active: 1981–2017

Rehman Rashid (24 October 1955 – 3 June 2017) was a prominent Malaysian journalist and writer.

== Early life and education ==
Rehman is of mixed ethnicity of Eurasian and Indian Muslim. Born in Taiping, Perak, Rehman studied in the Malay College Kuala Kangsar, before pursuing a degree in Marine Biology at University College Swansea in Wales. He was well known at University for writing and performing folk songs.

== Career ==
He worked with the Fisheries Research Institute in Penang and as a research associate with the Faculty of Fisheries and Marine Science of Universiti Putra Malaysia before becoming a journalist in 1981. After seven years as Leader Writer and columnist with the New Straits Times, he left the English-language daily after he was reprimanded for writing a scathing editorial criticising the 1987 banning of The Star, Watan and Sin Chew Jit Poh by the government.

Rehman subsequently joined Asiaweek magazine in Hong Kong as a Senior Writer. From there, he left for a year in Bermuda, as a Senior Writer with the Bermuda Business magazine. Rehman had several columns with NST: on Friday, Midweek, Comments and Scorpion Tales. He wrote about local and international current events, often offering a unique perspective that did not always align with his peers, superiors, or the individuals he specifically mentioned. He aimed to present issues accurately and provide commentary on the need for change, urging those in power to take action.

He was the Malaysian Press Institute's Journalist of the Year for 1985 for his coverage of the 1984 US presidential elections. He was Bermuda's Print Journalist of the Year for 1991.

== Death ==
He suffered a heart attack in January 2017 and was hospitalized at the Selayang Hospital. On 3 June 2017 he died at age 62.

== Publications ==
=== Non-fiction ===
- A Malaysian Journey (1993)
- Peninsula: A Story of Malaysia (2016)
- Small Town: A personal tribute to Kuala Kubu Baru, Hulu Selangor, Malaysia (2016)
- Generation: A Collection of Contemporary Malaysian Ideas (1997) - foreword

=== Fiction ===
- Malaysian Tales: Retold & Remixed (2011) - contributor to anthology
- Champion Fellas (2016) - contributor to anthology
