= Salleh Mohammad Yasin =

Salleh Mohammad Yasin is a Malaysian academic with expertise in microbiology. He was the director of the International Institute for Global Health based at the United Nations University in Kuala Lumpur from March 2007 until February 2013.

Mr. Salleh has served as vice-chancellor of the National University of Malaysia (Universiti Kebangsaan Malaysia, UKM). In August 2006, he served as chairman and chief executive of the National Accreditation Board, Malaysia. He was the founder dean of faculty of Allied Health Sciences (1992–1995) at the National University of Malaysia. He has taught at UKM since 1974, and since 1992 has been a full professor in the UKM Department of Biomedical Science, Faculty of Allied Health Sciences.

He is a graduate of Malay College Kuala Kangsar, and holds a Doctorandus degree from Bandung Institute of Technology, Indonesia and a Ph.D. from University of Bath, UK.
