= Malaysia–United Kingdom relations =

- Malaysia: United Kingdom

Diplomatic mission
- Malaysian High Commission, London: British High Commission, Kuala Lumpur

Envoy
- High Commissioner Datuk Mohamad Sadik Kethergany: High Commissioner Ailsa Terry

Malaysia–United Kingdom relations are bilateral foreign relations between Malaysia and the United Kingdom. Malaysia has a high commission in London, and the United Kingdom has a high commission in Kuala Lumpur. Both countries are full members of the Commonwealth of Nations.

== History ==
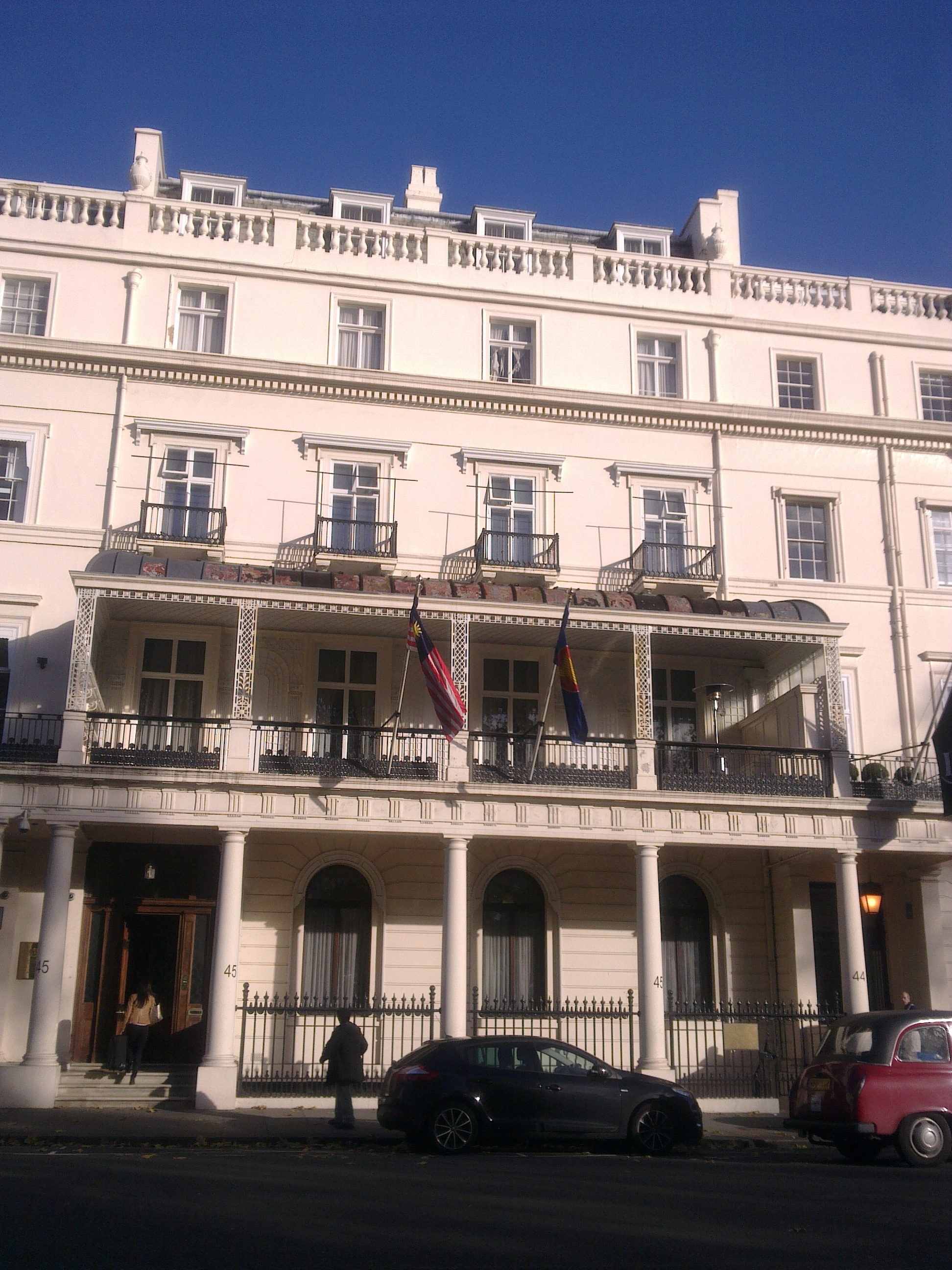
High Commission of Malaysia in the United Kingdom

=== Colonial period ===
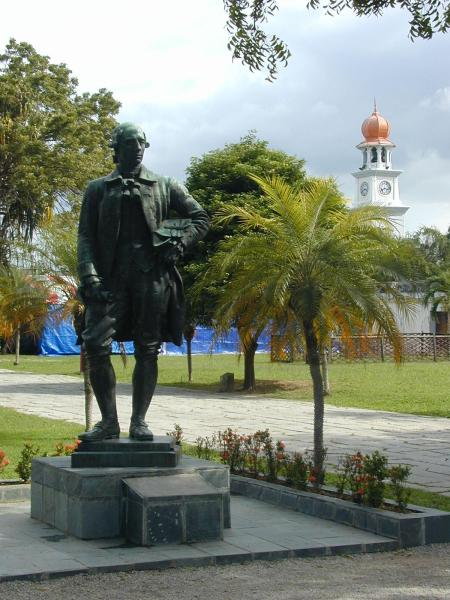
Francis Light founded Penang's capital city of George Town in 1786, making it the first British settlement in Southeast Asia. A statue of Light still stands in the city's Fort Cornwallis.

English traders had been present in Malay waters since the 17th century. Before the mid 19th century, British interests in the region were predominantly economic, with little interest in territorial control. The growth of the China trade in British ships increased the East India Company’s (EIC) desire for bases in the region. Various islands were used for this purpose, with the first permanent acquisition being Penang, which was leased from the Sultanate of Kedah in 1786. This was followed soon after by the leasing of a block of territory on the mainland opposite Penang (known as Province Wellesley). In 1795, during the Napoleonic Wars, the British with the consent of the Netherlands occupied Dutch Malacca to forestall possible French interest in the area.

In 1824 British hegemony in Malaya was formalised by the Anglo-Dutch Treaty, which divided the Malay Archipelago between Britain and the Netherlands. The Dutch evacuated Malacca and renounced all interest in Malaya, while the British recognised Dutch rule over the rest of the East Indies. By 1826, the British controlled Penang, Malacca, Singapore and the island of Labuan, which they established as crown colonies of the Straits Settlements, administered first under the EIC until 1867, when they were transferred to the Colonial Office in London. On the other hand, White Rajahs (founded by British adventurer James Brooke) ruled the Raj of Sarawak from 1841 to 1946, while North Borneo was founded by the North Borneo Chartered Company. Both Sarawak and North Borneo subsequently became a British Protectorate, and a Crown colony in 1946. In 1944, the British drew up plans for a Malayan Union, which would unite the Federated and Unfederated Malay States (except for Singapore), into a single Crown colony. It was established in 1946, and was dissolved in 1948 to be replaced by the Federation of Malaya. The federation became independent from the United Kingdom on 31 August 1957, and joined North Borneo, Sarawak and Singapore to form a new larger federation known as the Federation of Malaysia on 16 September 1963. However, in less than two years upon the founding of the federation, Singapore was expelled as a consequence of the 1964 race riots.

=== Present ===
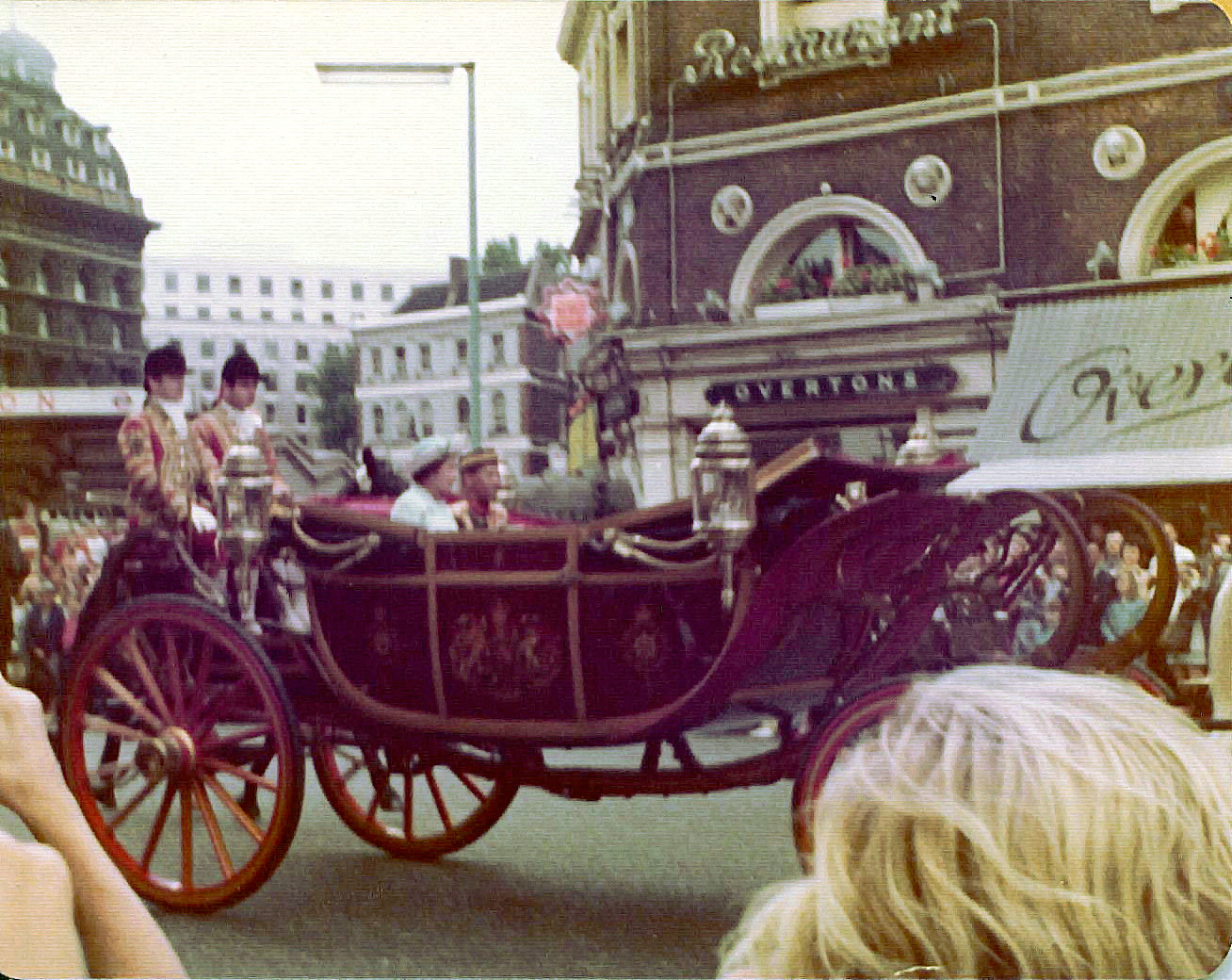
The Yang di-Pertuan Agong in a carriage with Queen Elizabeth II of the United Kingdom on the state visit to London, 1974.

The modern relations between the two countries was conditioned and shaped by British colonial rule in the country from the 19th century until its independence. Since the foundation of the Malaysian Federation, several visits have been made between each other leaders. The Yang di-Pertuan Agong Sultan Abdul Halim of Kedah paid a state visit to the United Kingdom in July 1974. The next Yang di-Pertuan Agong Sultan Azlan Shah of Perak paid a state visit to the United Kingdom in November 1993. Queen Elizabeth II paid state visits to Malaysia in October 1989 and September 1998. David Cameron, Prime Minister of the United Kingdom visited Malaysia in the first half of 2012 as part of his Asia tour. Prince William, Duke of Cambridge and his wife Catherine, Duchess of Cambridge visited Malaysia from 13 to 16 September 2012, as part of a nine-day tour through Commonwealth countries in Southeast Asia and the Pacific to celebrate Queen Elizabeth's Diamond Jubilee. On 2 November 2017, Charles, Prince of Wales and his wife Camilla, Duchess of Cornwall, made an official visit to Malaysia to commemorate the 60th anniversary of bilateral relations between the two countries.

== Economic relations ==
Since 1963, the British Malaysian Chamber of Commerce (BMCC) has been providing British businesses with networking, knowledge exchange, trade assistance and support in Malaysia.

Malaysia is the UK's second-largest trading partner in ASEAN.

In 1996, the two countries signed a double taxation agreement.

In 2017, the United Kingdom was Malaysia's fourth largest trading country in the European Union (EU) with annual goods and services trade at £3.34 billion. In April 2017, United Kingdom Secretary of International Trade Dr Liam Fox said their country affirmed its commitment to increase trade and investment as part of a determined effort to reach out to its trading partners and to reassure that the United Kingdom was open for business beyond Brexit after the former triggered article 50 for the secession from the EU while acknowledging the massive investments by Malaysian companies in the country such as in the Battersea Power Station. The Malaysian side also announced its ready to work with the United Kingdom. In September 2017, the United Kingdom Prime Minister's trade envoy to Malaysia Richard Graham visit Malaysia to promote United Kingdom's education expertise and positioned the country as the overseas investment destination of choice for Malaysian companies and investors, adding that the country has more than doubled its export funds to £5 billion to support two-way trade with Malaysia. In October 2017, the United Kingdom Mega Tech Mission 2017 (comprising 50 leading-edge technology companies) heading to Malaysia to widen business outreach and explore new technology deals with local players.

In July 2023, the United Kingdom has signed the agreement to accede to the Comprehensive and Progressive Agreement for Trans-Pacific Partnership, a trade bloc of which Malaysia is a founding member. This is the first free trade agreement between the two countries.

== Education relations ==
The British Council has provided English language mentoring to thousands of local primary school teachers in East Malaysia under the English Language Teacher Development Project (ELTDP) with the Malaysian government.

UK degree-awarding bodies are the main providers of Transnational Education (TNE) in Malaysia, with over 50% of all non-local programmes leading to a UK degree. Malaysia is the second-largest host country/region for UK TNE, (and the largest host country if distance-learning and Oxford Brookes' partnership with ACCA are excluded), although over the past few years there has been a decrease in TNE student numbers due to consolidation of the existing offer in the context of an increasingly competitive market, a developing local higher education sector and changes in local regulations.

Five UK universities have established branch campuses in Malaysia. Three campuses are located in Iskandar Puteri, Johor: University of Southampton Malaysia Campus, Newcastle University Medicine Malaysia, University of Reading; while one is located in Semenyih, Selangor: University of Nottingham Malaysia Campus; one is located in the Federal Territory of Putrajaya: Heriot-Watt University Malaysia. All these universities are being independently evaluated by UK's Quality Assurance Agency and Malaysia's Malaysian Qualification Agency.

There is also emerging interest of British Independent Schools to set up branch campuses or international schools in Malaysia "to tap into Asia's multi-billion dollar international school market". As of 2021, three independent schools have established branch campuses in Malaysia. One such campus is Epsom College Malaysia, located in Bandar Enstek. Another such campus is Marlborough College Malaysia, located in Iskandar Puteri. Charterhouse School had also recently ventured into the Malaysian and Asian International School market through the establishment of its campus in Kuala Lumpur.

In August 2022, Concord College announced the construction of Concord College International School in Sepang, adjacent to the Xiamen University Malaysia in Sunsuria City.

== Security relations ==
The United Kingdom maintains relations with Malaysia's Ministry of Defence and the Malaysian Armed Forces. This relation began during the colonial rule of Malaya and Singapore prior to Malaya's independence in 1957, including the confrontations between the ruling government and communist forces. Malaysia and the United Kingdom are both members of the Five Powers Defence Arrangements, since 1971.

== Gallery ==
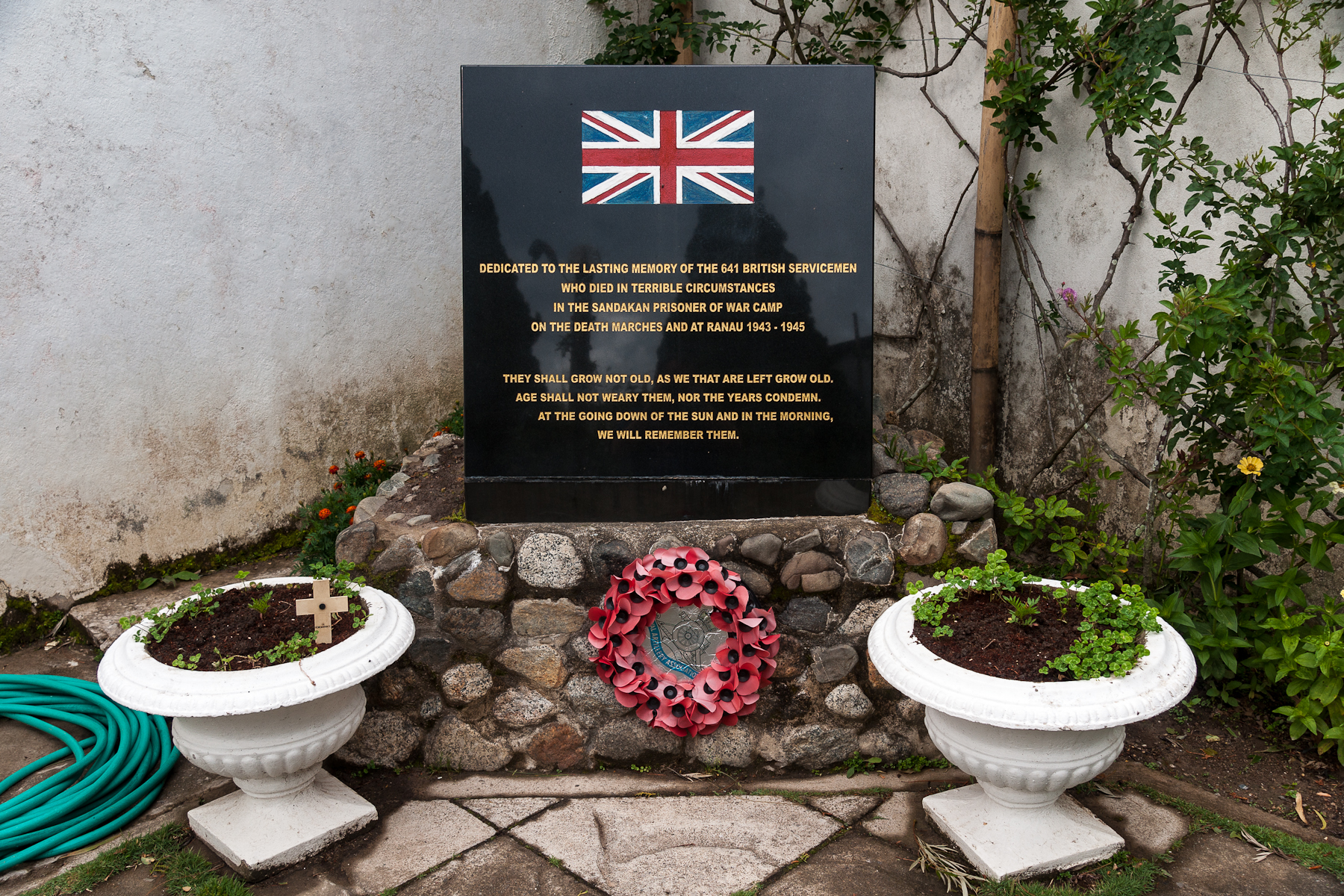
Memorial for 641 British servicemen who died on the Sandakan Death Marches and at Ranau, Sabah, Malaysia from 1943 to 1945.

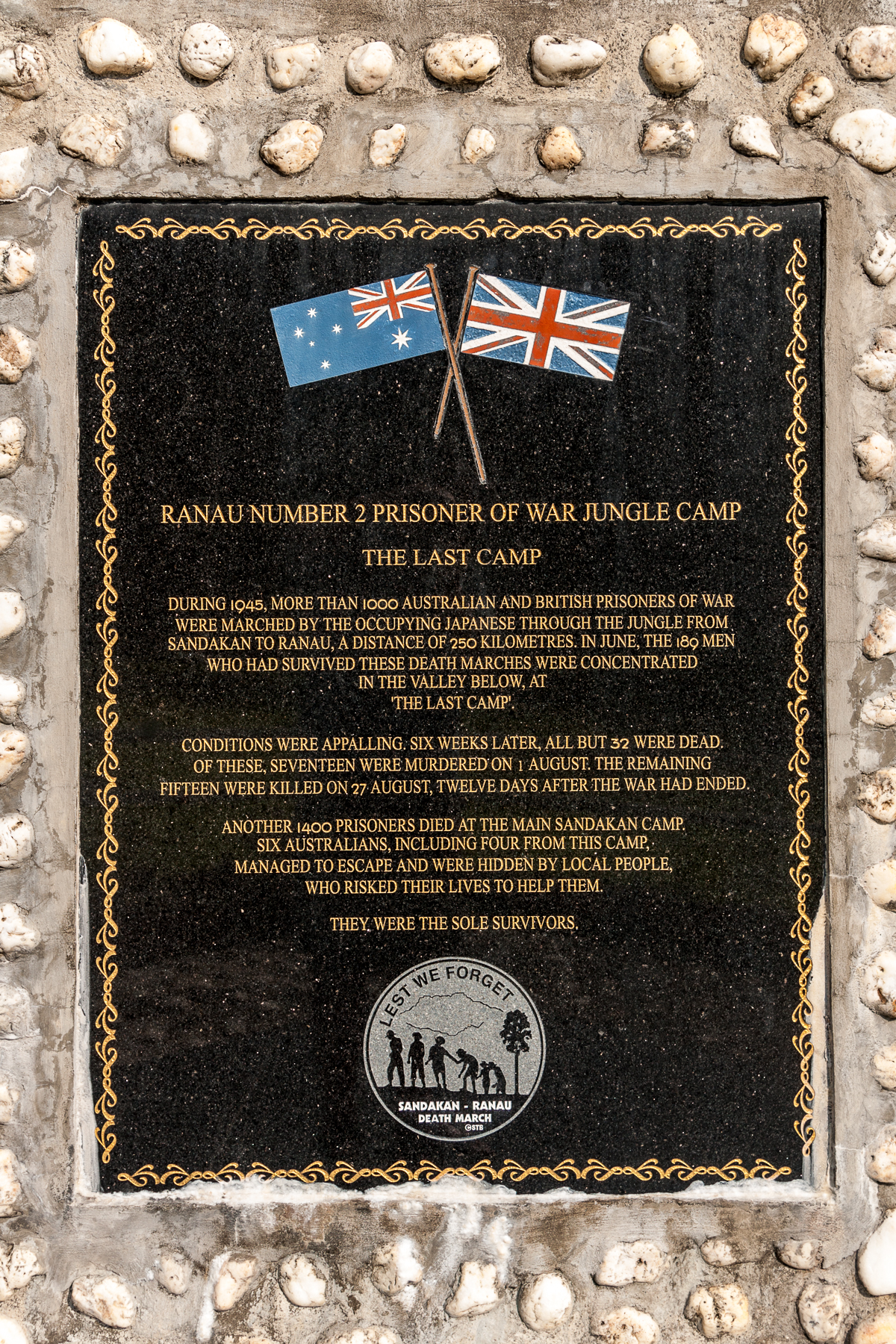
The Last POW Camp Memorial in Ranau, Sabah, Malaysia dedicated to Australian and British soldiers who died during the tragedy on the Sandakan Death Marches.

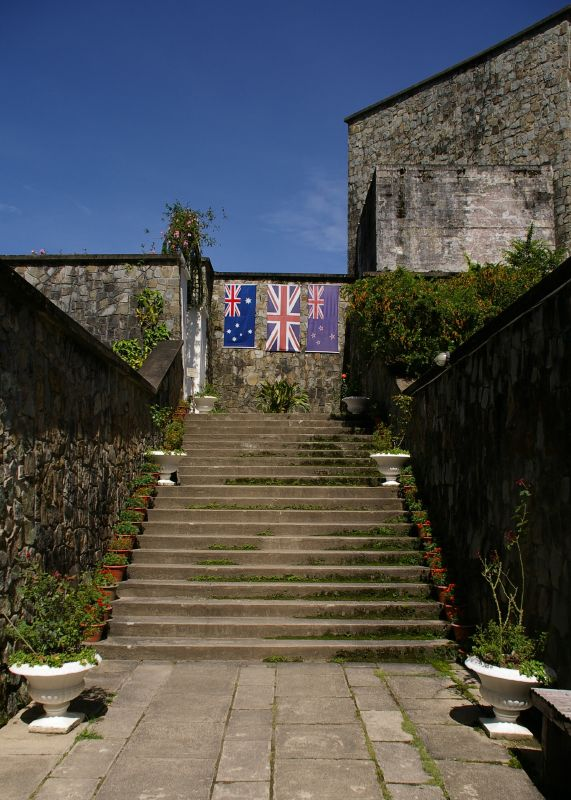
Three flags dedicated to Australian, British and New Zealander soldiers in Kundasang War Memorial, Ranau, Sabah, Malaysia.
