= Global Alliance of Leading-Edge Schools =

International educational organization

The Global Alliance of Leading-Edge Schools (Abbreviation: GALES) is an informal organization of leading preparatory and secondary schools from around the world. It was initiated in the year 2010. All the schools are among the top institutions in their respective countries. The Global Alliance of Leading-Edge Schools have discussions which aim to bring together a group of students who want to look beyond the parochial concerns of their own schools and national associations, and to talk through some key issues facing education, the world, and themselves as educational leaders.

== Members ==
- African Leadership Academy (South Africa)
- Anglican High School (Singapore)
- Beijing No.4 High School (China)
- Dalton School (United States)
- Gymnázium Jana Keplera (Czech Republic)
- Jianguo High School (Taiwan)
- Karachi Grammar School (Pakistan)
- Langkaer Gymnasium (Denmark)
- Lycee Louis le Grand (France)
- Malay College Kuala Kangsar (Malaysia)
- Marlborough College (United Kingdom)
- Maurick College (The Netherlands)
- Minjok Leadership Academy (South Korea)
- Montgomery Bell Academy (United States)
- Punahou School (United States)
- Raffles Institution (Singapore)
- Scotch College, Melbourne (Australia)
- Sir-Karl-Popper-Schule (Austria)
- Suankularb Wittayalai School (Thailand)
- Winchester College (United Kingdom)
- Xavier School, Metro Manila (Philippines)

== Conferences ==
GALES' first summit, titled TiltShift, was held at Singapore's Raffles Institution (RI), from June 12, 2011 to June 18, 2011, where members of the organization discussed on aspects pertaining to the popular topic of global warming.

On June 14, 2011, a conference, in collaboration with OnePeople.sg, on the aspects of racial harmony, was organized by GALES and held in Singapore.
