= Mazlan Nordin =

Malaysian journalist (1925–2012)

Mazlan Nordin (Jawi: مزلن نوردين (14 October 1925 – 22 March 2012) was a Malaysian journalist. He was a journalist at Utusan Melayu and Berita Harian; Editor-in-Chief and managing director of Utusan Melayu (1983–1987). Then first Chief Editor and chairman of the Malaysian National News Agency (BERNAMA) from February 1989 until 2003.

Mazlan Nordin was an Editorial Department Consultant at New Straits Times Press (M) Bhd (2000 – September 2001) and was a columnist in Mingguan Malaysia, The Sun, New Straits Times, Asiaweek magazine and Guest Writer at Universiti Kebangsaan Malaysia (UKM).

== Early life and education ==
Born 14 October 1925 in Tanjong Malim, Nordin attended Malay College Kuala Kangsar (MCKK), Kuala Kangsar, Perak in 1939 but his studies were interrupted when the Second World War broke out in 1941.

== Career ==
Mazlan Nordin began his journalism career as an assistant at Kedai Buku Yahaya Ariff & Sons in Kuala Kangsar. He was hired as a translator at Utusan Melayu, Singapore in June 1950. The then Editor-in-Chief of Utusan Melayu, Tan Abdul Samad Ismail, had guided the ins and outs of writing to his reporters. Samad Ismail assigned the young reporter to a story about riots surrounding the story of a young Dutch girl, named Maria Hertogh whose controversial adoption, Muslim upbringing, and return to her Catholic family and Catholic religion. His writing became front-page news at the paper.

On the side, Nordin used his English language skills to become a part-time reporter, rewriting news into English for the Singapore Free Press (later known as the Malay Mail).

After four months at Utusan Melayu, Nordin left to pursue an offer to become a broadcast journalist at Voice of America in New York.

In 1953, he rejoined Utusan Melayu. Later as editor of Berita Harian for five years. Berita Harian at that time was only a translation from the New Straits Times but changed and advanced to be more independent during Nordin's time there. He worked both as a translator and reporter and once again learned under Tan Sri A. Samad Ismail.

In 1983, he returned to Utusan Melayu as Editor-in-Chief until and then managing director until 1987.

In 1989, he became the first Editor in Chief of the Malaysian National News Agency, also known as BERNAMA.

He continued as an 'Editorial Consultant' at New Straits Times Press (M) Bhd. (2000 – September 2001).

board member of the World Enterprise Institute (2000), Chairman of the Press Foundation of Asia (1999), Chairman of the Afro-Asian People's Solidarity Organization Malaysia.

Until the end of his life he was a columnist in Mingguan Malaysia, The Sun, New Straits Times and Asiaweek magazine and Guest Writer at Universiti Kebangsaan Malaysia.

== Death ==
Nordin died on 22 March 2012, aged 87, at the University of Malaya Medical Center, Kuala Lumpur.

He was admitted to UMMC after falling in the bathroom of his son's house. His fourth son Yuri Azhar informed that the doctor gave his father a sedative to reduce the pain.

His eldest child died in 2005 of lung disease. Among those who visited the remains were Prime Minister, Datuk Seri Najib Razak; NSTP chairman, Tan Sri Mohamed Jawhar Hassan; Media Prima Executive chairman, Datuk Johan Jaafar; Media Prima Executive Director of News and Editorial Operations, Datuk Ahmad Abd Talib and former NSTP Group Editor-in-Chief, Datuk A Kadir Jasin.

Former Information Minister Tan Sri Zainuddin Maidin who was present at the funeral said Tan Sri Mazlan's passing was a great loss to the world of journalism.

== Awards ==
Universiti Kebangsaan Malaysia (UKM) awarded him an honorary doctorate in communication in 2005 for his contributions to journalism.

Ahli Mangku Negara (1966), Johan Setia Mahkota (1975), Johan Mangku Negara (1980), Setia Diraja Kedah (1982), Setia Mahkota Pahang (1982), Dato 'Paduka Mahkota Perak who carried the title of Dato' (1993) and Panglima Setia Mahkota (2005). Apart from that, Mazlan was also awarded the ASEAN Award (1987), the National Outstanding Journalist Award by the Association of Malay Journalists Malaysia (1996). He was also bestowed the Most Eminent Journalist award in 2002 by the Malaysian Press Institute and the Journalist of Distinction award by Universiti Kebangsaan Malaysia (UKM) in 2009.

- Malaysia :
  - Member of the Order of the Defender of the Realm (AMN) (1966)
  - Companion of the Order of Loyalty to the Crown of Malaysia (JSM) (1975)
  - Companion of the Order of the Defender of the Realm (JMN) (1980)
  - Commander of the Order of Loyalty to the Crown of Malaysia (PSM) – Tan Sri (2005)
- Kedah :
  - Companion of the Order of Loyalty to the Royal House of Kedah (SDK) (1982)
- Pahang :
  - Companion of the Order of the Crown of Pahang (SMP) (1982)
- Perak :
  - Knight Commander of the Order of the Perak State Crown (DPMP) – Dato' (1993)
