= Suhaimi Sulaiman =

Malaysian news anchor

Yang Berbahagia Datuk Suhaimi Sulaiman DPSM
- Born: 15 May 1962 (age 64); Malacca, Federation of Malaya (now Malaysia)
- Education: Bachelor's Degree in Business Administration
- Alma mater: Malay College of Kuala Kangsar; Portland State University; City University of Bellevue
- Occupations: News anchor, broadcast journalist, media strategist
- Years active: 1990–present
- Website: www.suhaimisulaiman.net

Suhaimi bin Sulaiman (born 15 May 1962) is a Malaysian news anchor, broadcast journalist and media strategist. He is a former Group Editor-in-Chief and Anchorman of 24-hour news and information channel Astro Awani, which operates from the heart of Kuala Lumpur.

== Early life and education ==
He was born on 15 May 1962 in the historical city of Malacca and attended the prestigious Malay College, Kuala Kangsar, Perak. He read Business Administration at the Portland State University before completing his Master in Business Administration at the City University in Bellevue in Washington.

== Career ==
He started his early career as a corporate and retail banker at the Bank of Commerce Berhad (now known as CIMB Berhad) in 1987.

In 1990, he joined Malaysian television channel, TV3 as a reporter and assistant producer. He started anchoring TV3 News in 1993, and soon became one of Malaysia's top names in broadcasting. He produced and hosted TV3's news and current affairs programmes Face to Face, Editor, Teleskop, Malaysia Hari Ini and Bincang Petang in addition to anchoring the prime time news, Buletin Utama and the English News, Nightline, he also anchored and produced special programmes like Al-Ries & Jack Trout marketing series, Bajet, Elections and many more. His last post at TV3 was Content Creation and Development Manager, he left the network in early 2003.

After leaving TV3 in 2003, he establish his own companies Suhaimi Sulaiman Omnimedia Pte Ltd and Suhaimi Sulaiman Communications. Between 2003 and early 2007, Suhaimi provided editorial and content consultancy services and public relations advice to various organizations. Among them are ACCA, Telekom Malaysia, Petronas, Universiti Teknologi Petronas and 1901 Hotdogs.

He also provided content development and communications training for the Malaysian public broadcasting network, RTM.

In 2007, he was enticed to join a start-up venture poised to launch Malaysia's first 24-hour news channel Astro Awani, where he was a member of the pioneer team that started the Malaysia's first 24-hour news channel. He mentored all the star anchors, coached the editorial team and led the 24/7 news and information channel team to excel in BREAKING NEWS and 360 analysis. Under his leadership, Astro Awani was ranked 4th in Google's Trending Searches of Malaysia 2014 for the comprehensive coverage of the disappearance of Malaysia Airlines MH370 and the crash of Malaysia Airlines MH17 in Ukraine. The Astro Awani website was number 2 on Effective Measure's list for news organization accessed via mobile in July 2014 due to MH17 coverage.

He left Astro Awani in March 2015 to focus on Communications, Content & Media Training & Consultancy, build a media powerhouse and a new fashion brand, Su & Ash. In April, Suhaimi has been appointed by Astro to provide Media Training for Astro's communications team and channel heads.

In 2020, Suhaimi appointed as the Chairman of Bernama, but resigned just after 5 months.

In 2023, he was appointed as the Director-General of Radio Televisyen Malaysia (RTM) and resigned from his post on 20 February 2026.

== Other ventures ==
He is a member of the Institute of Public Relations Malaysia, is also a communications, media, branding and perception management trainer who regularly conducts media relations training for the Malaysian Press Institute.

He also attended the CNN Journalism Fellowship Management Session at CNN's Headquarters in Atlanta, Georgia, United States in September, 2014 and is a CNN Journalism Fellow and completed the Harvard Case Study Training on "Effective Strategies for Media Companies" in October 2009.

He has provided strategic communications advice to the top management teams of multinational companies, public listed companies, opinion leaders, politicians and organizations in the public sector.

== Filmography ==
=== TV3 ===
- Face to Face (host)
- Editor (host)
- Teleskop (host)
- Malaysia Hari Ini (host)
- Bincang Petang (host)
- Buletin Utama (news anchor)
- Nightline (news anchor)

=== Astro Awani ===
- Agenda Awani (host)
- Focus Economy (host)

=== Astro Ria ===
- On Air (jury)

== Honours ==
- Malacca
  - Companion Class II of the Exalted Order of Malacca (DPSM) – Datuk (2023)
