= Raja Ahmad Aminullah =

Malaysian writer

Raja Ahmad Aminullah (born 12, September, 1951) is a poet and author from Malaysia who has published numerous books.

He has also written extensively on cultural matters as well as socio-political commentaries.

== Early life and career ==
He was born in Ipoh, Malaysia in 1955 and received his education at the Malay College Kuala Kangsar. He continued his studies in mass communication at ITM.

In 1973, he was an exchange student in a program organised by an American College known as World Campus Afloat. Among the courses he studied were government and economics. At the program, he also attended a poetry workshop helmed by Todd Bender from Columbia University.

He read law at the University of London in the 1980s. Raja Ahmad was the president of the Malaysian students unions in London and in the United Kingdom.

He served as director on the board of the leading daily newspaper Utusan Melayu in Malaysia from 1988 to 2001. Besides serving in corporate bodies, he was also active in party politics for twenty years.

In the nineties he founded and led an organisation to empower the poor and the marginalised in the “Foundation for the Advancement of the Poor” in the state.

In 1996, he also set up and chaired the Perak Arts Foundation (Yayasan Kesenian Perak) with other Malaysian writers and art activists. The group organised annual international arts festivals in the state in the 1990s. Many established painters, writers, poets and performers from more than 10 countries participated in the events.

In December 2023, Raja Ahmad chaired and organised an international literary event “ R A International Poets, Writers and Readers Festival”. This event involved 100 poets and writers from fifteen countries.

== Published works ==
Raja Ahmad’s books of poetry include: “Menyarung Jiwa (Soulship)” (2004), “Kata Kata Hati” (2006), an anthology featuring three Malaysian poets: Raja Ahmad Aminullah, Zakaria Ali and Mustapha Ibrahim (2017), An anthology of Poems by Malaysian and Indonesian Poets (2017), “Laugh, My Beloved Country” (2017) and “Continuum” (2023).

His non-fiction works include: “The Captive Mind: Intellectuals and Power” (2011), “Nusantara: Art and Liberation” (2012), “Conversations with raja ahmad aminullah - Fidelity to Ideas” (2018) and “The Bell Has Rung -Time For The New Generation” (2022), “Revolusi Kebudayaan (2026), “Minda Tertawan – Intelektual, Rausyanfikir dan Kuasa New Edition (2026).

His latest book “Sepucuk Surat, Satu Episod” (2026) references an episode when he attempted to intercede on medical grounds with then prime minister Dr Mahathir Mohamad on behalf of his jailed deputy Anwar Ibrahim. He was asked to resign as a director of Utusan Melayu and joined Parti Keadilan Nasional soon after, serving as an advisor in the party's formative years.

His writings generally dwell on issues pertaining to justice as well as on the plight of the people living in the margins, on the periphery.
