= Seascraper =

Proposed type of large building

A seascraper, also known as a waterscraper, is a proposed large building which will function as a floating city. It would generate its own energy through wave, wind, current, solar, etc. and produce its own food through farming, aquaculture, hydroponics, etc. The term "Seascraper" is an analogous derivative of "Skyscraper".

Architect Koen Othuis of the Netherlands specializes in "amphibious" buildings, some floating and some using other systems to adapt to wet environments. In 2010 Architect Sarly Adre Sarkum of Malaysia from architecture firm SA Squared or Sarly Adre Sarkum Architecture proposed a building about the size of the Empire State Building which would float in the ocean with only the top few stories out of water. It would house thousands of people and be self-contained, growing its own food and generating its own energy.

Another design concept for a mostly submerged structure is The Gyre-Seascraper, which would stretch 400 meters deep and over a kilometer across. It is designed to house over 2000 people, and be completely self-sufficient, producing its own food and electricity. It was designed by the firm Zigloo.ca, as a submission to eVolo's Skyscraper Design Competition in 2009.

A seascraper concept was proposed and described by William Erwin and Dan Fletcher in the 2009 Evolo Skyscraper Competition, where they stated:

"...The Seascraper is essentially a floating city, it will consist of homes, commercial space, recreation areas, and produce all of the energy necessary to support these functions. Seascrapers will be located where deep sea current is adequate for the production of power, for example, the Gulf Stream. Tethered to the hull, turbines will reach to depths ranging from 800 - 1200ft and harvest ocean currents. A flexible photovoltaic skin will also generate a large amount of energy. The concave shape of the seascraper not only allows light to penetrate to the lower levels, but collects and processes rainwater..."

== See also ==
- Freedom Ship
- Ocean colonization
- Seasteading
- Very large floating structure
