= Sarly Adre Sarkum =

Malaysian architect

Ar. Sarly Adre Sarkum
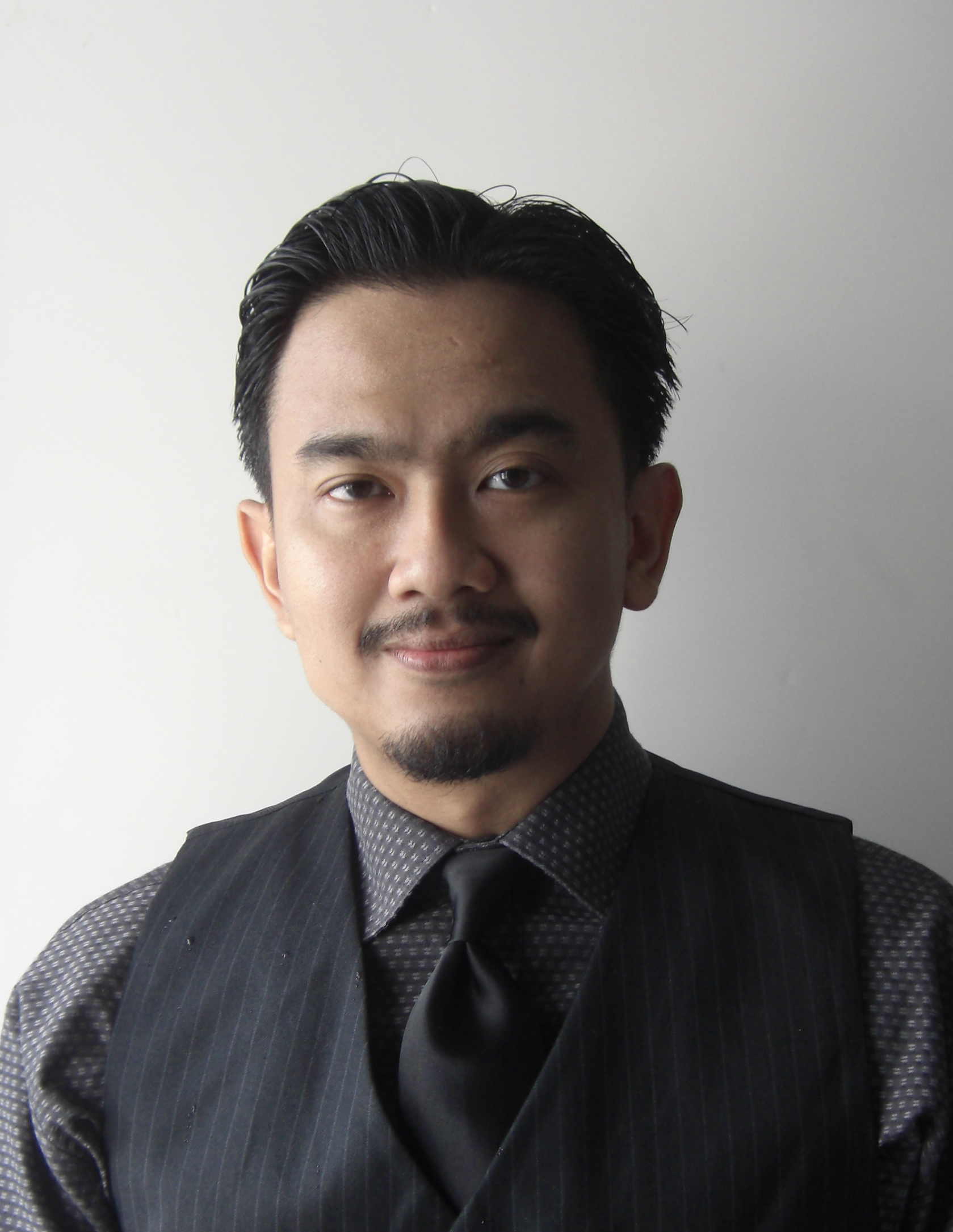
- Born: 1 May 1975 (age 51); Kuala Lumpur, Malaysia
- Education: Malay College Kuala Kangsar, Universiti Sains Malaysia, University of Liverpool
- Occupation: Architect
- Practice: [SA]² or Sarly Adre Sarkum Architecture Sdn. Bhd.

Ar. Sarly Adre Sarkum is an architecture futurist, sustainability proponent and design activist. Currently he helms the hybrid architectural design firm SA or Sarly Adre Sarkum Architecture Sdn. Bhd. He is the Immediate Past President of the Malaysia Green Building Confederation which is Malaysia's Green Building Council under the auspices of the World Green Building Council. He is also currently an elected council member of Pertubuhan Akitek Malaysia (The Malaysian Institute of Architects). He was one of the five directors of the Green Building Index (GBI) Green Building Certification System and served as GBI Accreditation Panel as well.

In 2010 he also developed the Seascraper for the Evolo Skyscraper Competition in 2010.

== Early life and education ==
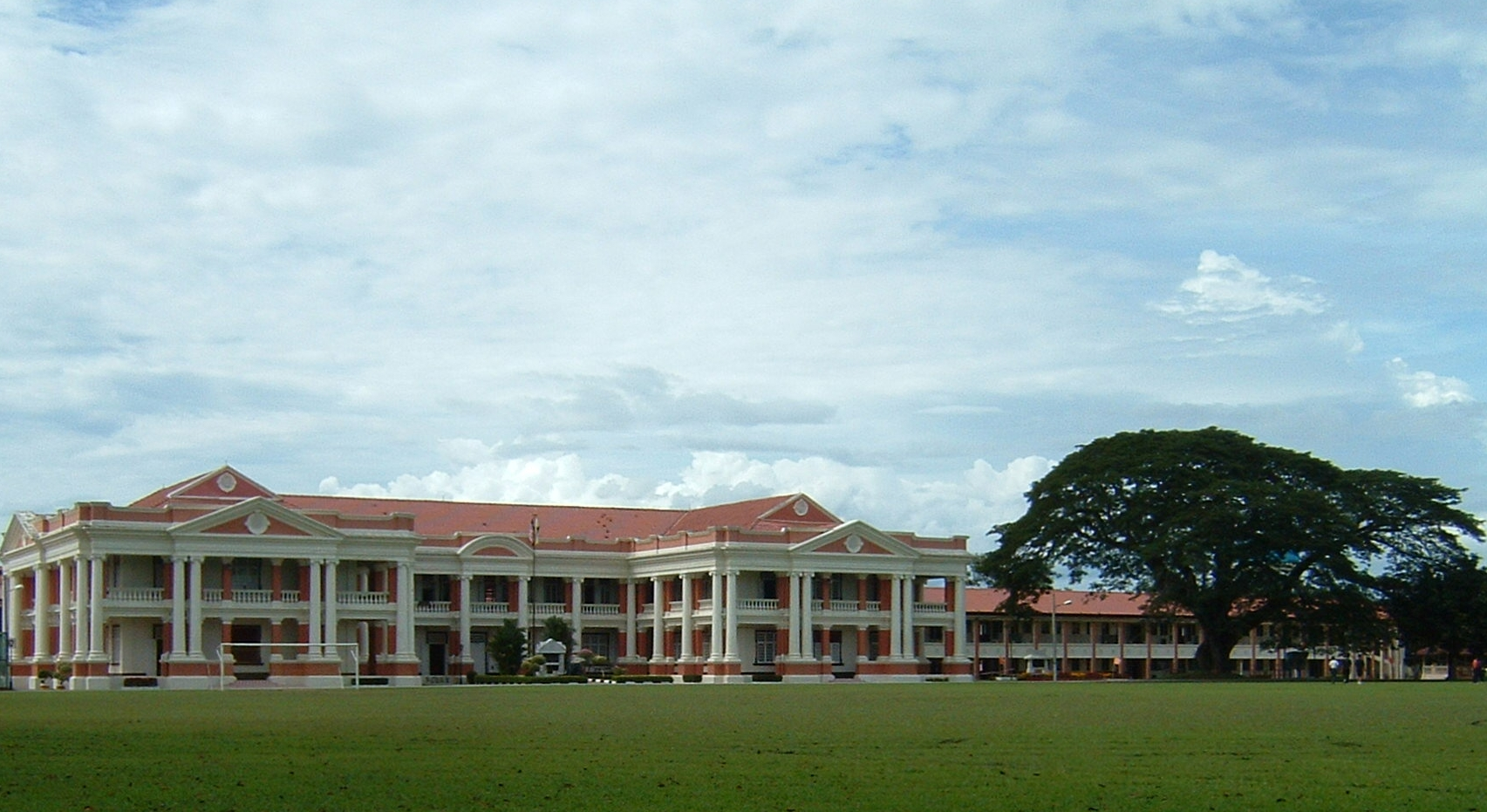
Malay College Kuala Kangsar

Sarly Adre was born in 1975 at the Hospital Besar Kuala Lumpur. His primary education was at Sekolah Kebangsaaan Tengku Raudzah in Alor Setar, Kedah, Wellesley Primary School in Penang and King George V Primary School in Negeri Sembilan. Despite his personal struggle with dyslexia his excellent performance in the primary year 5 National Standardised Assessment Exam earned him a place in the premier school Malay College Kuala Kangsar.

He later did his 'A' Levels in Mara Science College Kuala Lumpur (MSMKL - Maktab Sains Mara Kuala Lumpur) in Cheras, Kuala Lumpur in 1993 he won the nationwide science essay writing competition by BP (British Petroleum) Malaysia with his essay entitled "Renewable Energy Resources for a Sustainable Development in Malaysia" which he became Malaysia's representative for the 35th London International Youth Science Forum under BP's full sponsorship. He continued his architectural preparatory studies at Institut Teknologi Mara Shah Alam. He subsequently obtained his Bachelor of Arts in Architecture with Honours from the University of Liverpool. After returning to Malaysia he spent a year out for practical experience and to complete a family project after which he pursued a post graduate degree at Universiti Sains Malaysia. He was conferred the Bachelor of Architecture (Honours). He was also awarded the 'Gold Medal' for being the best student in Architecture at the university in 2001. His graduating Project Neo Tamingsari - Cynosural Nexus For Cyber Technetronic Defence was chosen to represent Malaysia in the first Archiprix International in Rotterdam Netherlands as one of the world's best graduating project. The project was supervised by Dr Ku Azhar Ku Hassan, Dr Kenneth Yeang and Mr. Azmiluddin. At the Archprix International Workshop he led the team consisting of Japanese architects Maya Nishikori and Tsuyoshi Noguchi, under the supervision of Kamiel Klaasse with Michel Schreinemachers to collaborate on a project named Phat House. The Phat House is a house that transforms itself in accordance with the users tendencies and whims with reference to the emerging 'hip hop' culture in Hoogvliet, Rotterdam.

== Career ==
=== 2001–2005 ===
Sarly Adre started work with Penang's largest firm at the time Azza Associate Architect (Penang)

=== 2005–2008 ===
Sarly Adre then became a Senior Architect at FAA Architect in Kuala Lumpur

=== 2008–2009 ===
Sarly Adre became Associate Director at Aza Project Consultancy Sdn Bhd

=== 2009–2013 ===
Upon obtaining his Part 3 Professional Architecture License from the Board or Architects Malaysia. He became a partner at BDA Architects Sdn Bhd and led the Kuala Lumpur office of the Architectural Firm.

=== 2013–Current ===
After relinquishing all shares of BDA Architects Sdn. Bhd.in 2013 Sarly Adre then founded and led [SA]² or Sarly Adre Sarkum Architecture Sdn. Bhd. which epitomised his belief in a new form of architectural practice which uses disruptive technologies at its very core to generate more efficiency and facilitate better design.

=== 2019–2024 ===
He has been appointed Associate Professor (Industry) by the University of Malaya at the Department of Architecture, Faculty of Built Environment

=== 2024–Current ===
Ar. Sarly Adre Sarkum was appointed as the chief executive officer of the Green Building Index (GBI) with a clear mandate to revitalise the organisation and reaffirm its position as the nation’s leading green building certification body.

== Exhibitions ==
- 12th Venice Biennale of Architecture (2010) - Representing Malaysia
- 13th Venice Biennale of Architecture (2012) - Representing Malaysia He design the Malaysian Pavilion display to hold all the other exhibits, the polymorphic form was dubbed 'The Armature' was constructed out of steel.
- 14th Venice Biennale of Architecture (2014)- He played a pivotal role in the representing Malaysia in the 14th Venice Biennale of Architecture as co-curator of the Malaysian Pavilion. The Malaysian pavilion had a theme of "Sufficiency" which promotes the idea to satisfy the need rather than the want. The theme resonated well with the overall exhibition theme of 'Fundamentals" which was directed and curated by Rem Koolhaas. As a firm he submitted a piece of work titled "3D Printed Neighbourhood" as a response to the overwhelming need for housing in the coming century.
- Malaysia Pavilion - After the successful showing of the Malaysian Pavilion in the Venice Biennale of Architecture (2014), the whole Malaysian Pavilion was reconstructed and showcased at Taylor's University Lakeside Campus in January 2015 for the benefit of the Malaysian Public.
- 30 Under 40: Revisited 2015 - Exhibition highlighting selected works of architects showcased in the 30 under 40 : Emerging Architects book after nearly five years the book has been published.

== Government Appointments ==
=== Panel of Expert for Ministry of Local Government Development (Kementerian Pembangunan Kerajaan Tempatan, KPKT) ===
==== 2023 - Current ====
Ar. Sarly Adre Sarkum was appointed as a Panel of Experts (PoE) by the Minister of the Ministry of Local Government Development (Kementerian Pembangunan Kerajaan Tempatan, KPKT) YB Nga Kor Ming in 2023. His appointment to this distinguished panel underscores his critical role in advising on architectural, urban planning, and sustainable development matters at the national level.

Within the PoE framework, Ar. Sarly contributed his extensive expertise in architecture and green building and took on a leadership role by spearheading the subcommittee focusing on local authorities.

== Publications and media ==
=== Appearance in books ===
- 30 under 40 - Emerging Malaysian Architects - ISBN 9789675264078 - Publisher: PAM Pertubuhan Akitek Malaysia (Malaysian Institute of Architects) - Year Published: 2013 - Pages 133 pgs
- Cities of Tomorrow - Envisioning The Future of Urban Habitat - Edited by: Carlo Aiello - ISBN 9780981665832 - Publisher: Evolo Press - Year Published: 2013 - Pages: 122 pgs
- Schwimmende Wohnbauten: Grundlagen (German) (Floating Residential Buildings: Basics) - Authors: Horst Stopp and Peter Strangfeld - ISBN 9783410204060 - Publisher: Beuth Praxis Year Published: 2012 - Pages: 194 pgs

=== Appearance in other media ===
- Culturetrip Article "10 Inspirational Malaysian Activists Who Changed The Nation" by Michelle Leong published 25 March 2018
