= Watan (Malaysia) =

Malay-language newspaper in Malaysia that was banned in 1987

- Type: Weekly newspaper
- Format: Tabloid
- Owner(s): Syarikat Watan; later Pustaka Antara, Karangkraf, Gagasan Baiduri, Naluri Teratai
- Founded: 1976
- Ceased publication: 2011
- Political alignment: Independent; later alignment unclear
- Language: Malay
- Headquarters: Kuala Lumpur

Watan (lit. "Homeland") was a Malaysian Malay-language political tabloid newspaper published between 1976 and 1996, with a brief revival between 2008 and 2011. It was regarded as one of the earliest independent voices in Malaysian journalism, offering an alternative to the mainstream press of the time.

Watan was remembered particularly as one of the three newspapers banned in 1987 following the Operation Lallang initiated by the government. Before the ban, the newspaper was published by Kumpulan Karangkraf Sdn Bhd every Wednesday and Saturday. According to The New Paper, Watan was famous for its sensational headlines.

== History ==
Watan was first published in 1976 by Syarikat Watan in Brickfields, Kuala Lumpur. The newspaper was owned by former cabinet minister and UMNO secretary-general Tan Sri Mohd. Khir Johari, who served as its chairman until 1984. In its early years, the paper was noted for reflecting student and intellectual discourse, covering both domestic political issues and international developments such as the 1979 Iranian Revolution.

Subky Latif, a journalist and political writer, was appointed editor, with Melan Abdullah, former editor-in-chief of Utusan Melayu, serving as editorial advisor. Subky later left to establish Suara Merdeka but returned after that publication lost its license.

Originally bilingual, Watan discontinued its English-language section in August 1978. It was first priced at 25 sen, later increasing to 40 sen in 1981. The tabloid format measured 11.2 by 15 inches and consisted of 24 pages.

== Publishing changes ==
Initially a weekly, Watan briefly became a daily before reverting to weekly circulation in 1979. From January 1981, it was published twice weekly, on Tuesdays and Fridays.

On 15 November 1983, its editor Abdul Halim was detained under the Internal Security Act, while its then-owner Datuk Abdul Aziz of Pustaka Antara was also investigated. Publication was suspended after the government deemed one of its reports to be communist propaganda. Watan resumed publication on 27 November 1984 under the Karangkraf Group, with a new slogan "Watan Akhbar Dinamik" ("Watan a Dynamic Newspaper").

It was banned again on 27 October 1987 alongside The Star and Sin Chew Jit Poh, before resuming five months later with a thrice-weekly schedule. Its slogan was changed to "Akhbar Dinamik: Mempertingkatkan Pemikiran Rakyat" ("A Dynamic Newspaper: Elevating the Mind of the People").

In 1990, Abdul Jalil Ali joined as editor. At the end of 1992, ownership was transferred to Gagasan Baiduri, a company linked to politician Tengku Adnan Tengku Mansor. Relaunched on 1 January 1993 as a daily, it adopted the name Harian Watan with the slogan "Akhbar Alternatif Anda dan Keluarga" ("An Alternative Newspaper for You and Family"). Later it became a twice-weekly newspaper, but publication ended in 1996 due to poor sales.

In 2008, the newspaper was revived under the name Mingguan Watan, where it began to be redistributed nationwide on 16 August 2008 after receiving a publication permit from the Ministry of Home Affairs earlier in the month. Mingguan Watan is then published in a tabloid form by Naluri Teratai Sdn Bhd, owned by Wan Bahador Wan Ismail and Rosli Abul Zarim. Wan Bahador was one of the former Watan journalists. The Editor-in-Chief of the newspaper was Zabidi Said.

After the defamation case judgement against them, Mingguan Watan ceased publication in 2011.

== Defamation case ==
On 11 August 2011, the Kota Bharu High Court ordered Mingguan Watan to pay a total of RM1.41 million in damages in a defamation suit brought by Kelantan Deputy Menteri Besar Datuk Ahmad Yaacob and state executive councillors Datuk Husam Musa and Datuk Anuar Tan Abdullah.

The lawsuit stemmed from an article published in the 21–27 December 2008 edition of the newspaper, which alleged financial misconduct among several Kelantan PAS leaders serving on the board of the Kelantan State Economic Development Corporation (Perbadanan Kemajuan Iktisad Negeri Kelantan, or PKINK). The plaintiffs argued that the report falsely accused them of abuse of power and embezzlement linked to PKINK's subsidiary Kelstone Sdn Bhd.

The High Court awarded RM470,000 each in damages to the three plaintiffs. Named as defendants in the suit were journalist M. Goenawan Mohamed, editor-in-chief Wan Bahador Wan Ismail (also known as Baha Azuwan), editorial board advisor Raja Ahmad Zainuddin Raja Omar, the publisher Naluri Teratai Sdn. Bhd., and distributor Tristan Media Distributors.

Prior to the judgment, PKINK's chief executive officer Mohd Sabri Abdullah had formally requested that Mingguan Watan issue an apology. In response, the newspaper stated in its 4–10 January 2009 edition that it did not need to apologize.

== See also ==
- Media in Malaysia
- The Star (Malaysia)
- Sin Chew Daily
- Utusan Malaysia
- Karangkraf
