= List of high commissioners of Malaysia to the United Kingdom =

Coordinates: 51.499914°N 0.152884°W

High Commissioner of Malaysia to the United Kingdom
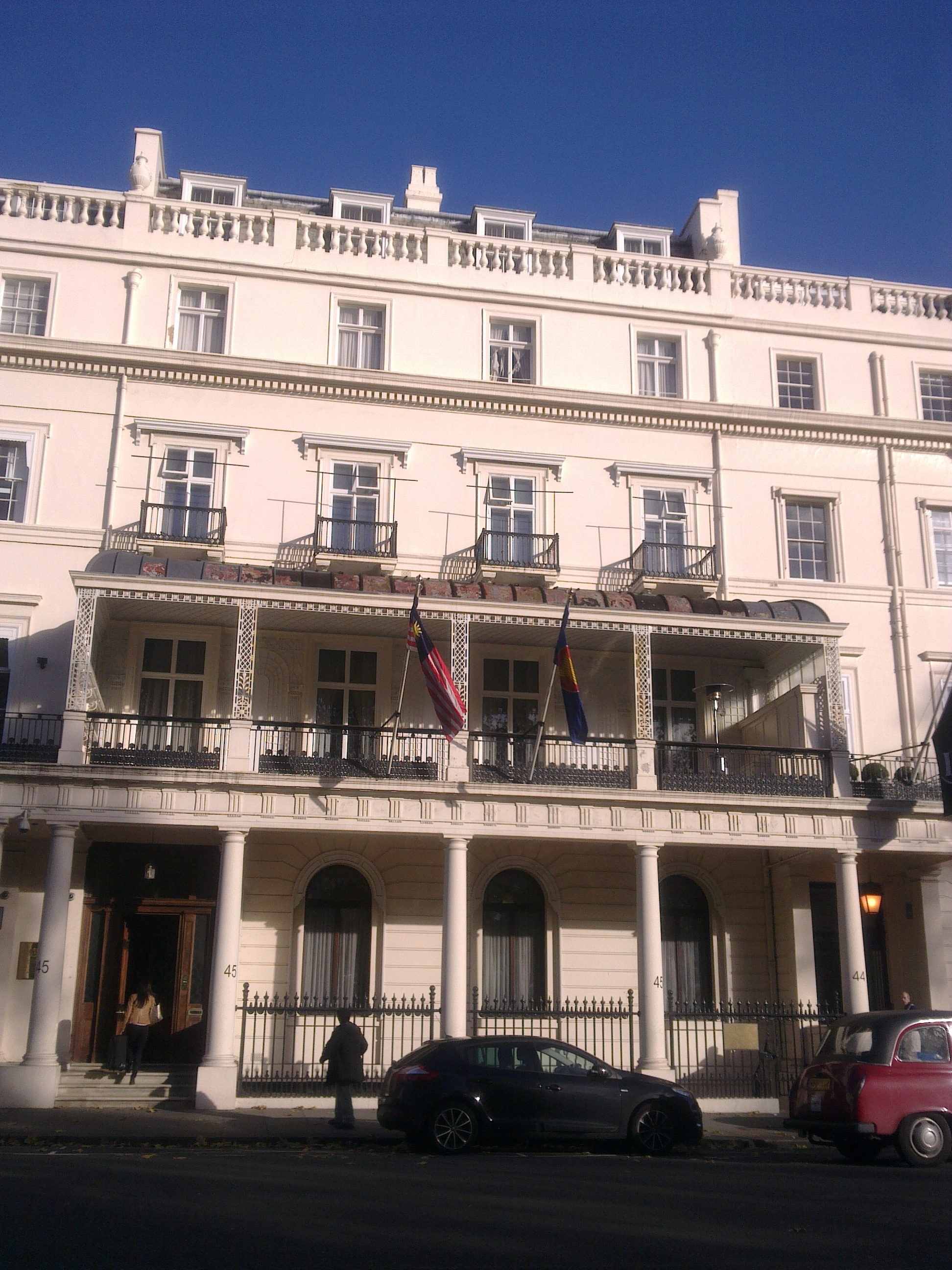
- Incumbent; Zakri Jaafar since 5 August 2021
- Style: His Excellency
- Seat: High Commission of Malaysia, London, United Kingdom
- Appointer: Yang di-Pertuan Agong
- Inaugural holder: Raja Uda Raja Muhammad
- Formation: 1 July 1953
- Website: www.kln.gov.my/web/gbr_london/home

The high commissioner of Malaysia to the United Kingdom of Great Britain and Northern Ireland is the head of Malaysia's diplomatic mission to the United Kingdom. The position has the rank and status of an ambassador extraordinary and plenipotentiary and is based in the High Commission of Malaysia, London.

== List of heads of mission ==
=== High commissioners to the United Kingdom ===
| High Commissioner | Term start | Term end |
|---|---|---|
| Raja Uda Raja Muhammad | 1 July 1953 | 16 October 1954 |
| Othman Mohamad | 16 October 1954 | 5 July 1956 |
| Nik Ahmad Kamil Nik Mahmud | 1957 | 1959 |
| Tunku Yaacob Sultan Abdul Hamid Halim Shah | 1959 | January 1966 |
| Syed Sheh Shahabudin | 29 January 1966 | December 1966 |
| Abdul Jamil Abdul Rais | December 1966 | June 1971 |
| Abdul Aziz Yeop | 21 July 1971 | 1973 |
| Syed Zahiruddin Syed Hassan | 16 May 1973 | 20 May 1975 |
| Abdullah Ali | 13 November 1976 | 1978 |
| Raja Aznam Raja Ahmad | 17 July 1979 | 28 December 1982 |
| Kassim Muhammad Hussein | 16 March 1983 | March 1986 |
| Jamaluddin Abu Bakar | 24 March 1986 | 24 January 1988 |
| Mon Jamaluddin | 4 May 1988 | 13 January 1990 |
| Wan Sidek Wan Abdul Rahman | 1 May 1990 | 1992 |
| Kamaruddin Abu | 16 December 1992 | February 1998 |
| Mohd Amir Jaafar | 10 March 1998 | 1 February 2001 |
| Salim Hashim | 10 March 2001 | 31 July 2003 |
| Abdul Aziz Mohammed | 4 September 2003 | 7 February 2010 |
| Zakaria Sulong | 26 May 2010 | 22 December 2013 |
| Ahmad Rasidi Hazizi | 14 January 2014 | March 2019 |
| Mohamad Sadik Kethergany | 21 March 2019 | 3 April 2020 |
| Zakri Jaafar | 5 August 2021 | Incumbent |

== See also ==
- Malaysia–United Kingdom relations
