= Saleh Sulong =

Tan Sri Mohd Saleh bin Sulong is a Malaysian industrialist and chairman of the DRB-HICOM group.
