= Malay College Kuala Kangsar =

Private school in Kuala Kangsar, Malaysia

Coordinates: 4°46′34″N 100°56′17″E

The Malay College Kuala Kangsar
- Kolej Melayu Kuala Kangsar كوليج ملايو كوالا كڠسر

Location
- Jalan Tun Razak; Kuala Kangsar, Perak; Malaysia

Information
- Type: Full boarding school Government cluster school High performance school
- Motto: Latin: Fiat Sapientia Virtus (Manliness Through Wisdom)
- Established: 2 January 1905; 121 years ago
- Founders: Sultan Idris of Perak; Sultan Sulaiman of Selangor; Sultan Ahmad of Pahang; Yamtuan Muhammad Shah of Negeri Sembilan
- Royal Patron: Conference of Rulers; Sultan Nazrin Shah of Perak
- Chairman: Tan Sri Dr. Ir. Ahmad Tajuddin Ali
- Headmaster: Hj. Ahmad Salehin Hj. Sha’ari
- Grades: Form 1 – Form 5 Year 1 & 2 of IB Diploma Programme
- Gender: Male
- Enrolment: 650
- Language: Malay, English, Japanese, Chinese, Arabic, French
- Houses: Idris, Sulaiman, Mohd Shah, Ahmad
- Colours: White, Red, Yellow, Black
- Accreditation: Ministry of Education; International Baccalaureate Organisation
- Yearbook: The Malay College Magazine
- Affiliations: Sekolah Berasrama Penuh; GALES; Trust School; SBP School of Global Excellence; Apple Distinguished Schools
- Alumni: The Malay College Old Boys Association
- Website: www.mckk.edu.my
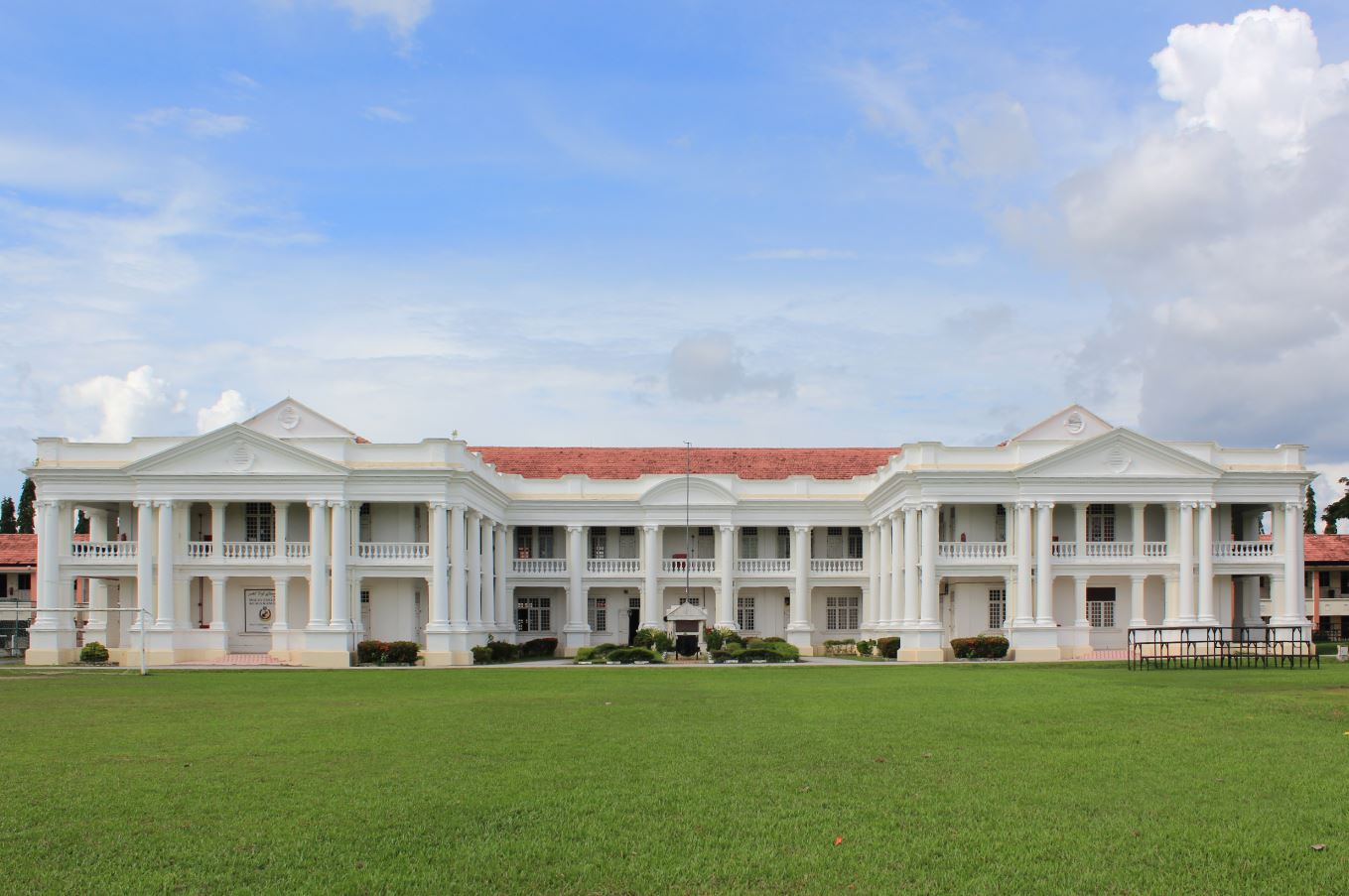

The Malay College Kuala Kangsar (abbreviated MCKK; Malay: Kolej Melayu Kuala Kangsar; Jawi: كوليج ملايو كوالا كڠسر) is a residential school in Malaysia. It is an all-boys and all-Malay school in the royal town of Kuala Kangsar, Perak. It is sometimes dubbed "the Eton College of the East".

The Malay College Kuala Kangsar was awarded the Cluster School of Excellence title by the Ministry of Education. Since 2010, the school was awarded the High Performance School, a title awarded to Malaysian top schools. The school has been selected as an International Baccalaureate (IB) World School for Diploma Programme since 2011 and Middle Years Programme since 2016. The Malay College Kuala Kangsar offers the national curriculum (SPM) while implementing IB curriculum standards. MCKK is also a member of an international organisation of best secondary schools in the world called Global Alliance of Leading-Edge Schools led by Raffles Institution of Singapore. About 10% of current students are with public & private scholarships, such as Bank Negara Malaysia, Telekom Malaysia, Yayasan Peneraju Pendidikan Bumiputera and many more. The school’s active participation in various Apple-hosted programmes, competitions and has incorporated the use of Apple technologies in classrooms had led to the school being recognised as an Apple Distinguished School since 2022.

The school is the only boarding school in Malaysia that are under royal patronage. The school's patron is the Conference of Rulers. As an institution under the royal patronage of Conference of Rulers, the school receives royal visits from the King of Malaysia every five years and every year from the Sultan of Perak as school's board chairman. The board members are also appointed by the Conference.

The school specialises in rugby, basketball, hockey, debate, robotics and most prominently, leadership.

== History ==
=== Foundation and early development ===
The Malay College Kuala Kangsar was established on 2 January 1905 as the Malay Residential School of Kuala Kangsar. It was the first fully residential school established in what is now Malaysia.

The proposal for the school was developed by Richard James Wilkinson, the inspector of schools for the Federated Malay States. In a letter to the resident-general dated 24 February 1904, Wilkinson advocated the establishment of a residential institution for the education of Malay boys from prominent families and their preparation for employment in the colonial administration.

The project also received the support of the rulers of the four Federated Malay States: Sultan Idris Murshidul Azzam Shah of Perak, Sultan Sulaiman of Selangor, Tuanku Muhammad Shah of Negeri Sembilan and Sultan Ahmad Muadzam Shah of Pahang. The four rulers were subsequently commemorated in the names of the college's student houses.

William Hargreaves, formerly the headmaster of Penang Free School, was appointed the school's first headmaster. Its inaugural intake comprised 40 pupils. According to a report published by the Straits Echo on 15 April 1905, the school initially operated from several temporary premises, including Hargreaves's rented residence and buildings previously occupied by railway employees.

The construction of a permanent campus was approved on 23 December 1905. Its principal building, subsequently known as the Big School, came into use on 1 May 1909 and was formally opened by the Sultan of Perak on 11 December of that year. On the same occasion, the institution was renamed the Malay College Kuala Kangsar.

A colonial report published in 1910 stated that the government intended the college to educate the sons of Malay rulers and members of the upper classes according to the model of a British public school, preparing them to participate in the administration of the country.

=== Changes in admission and administration ===
The college was initially intended principally for princes and the sons of Malay aristocratic and chiefly families from the Federated Malay States, as well as from territories including Brunei and Sarawak. Consequently, relatively few pupils from non-aristocratic backgrounds were admitted during its early decades.

Admission gradually became less closely associated with hereditary status after the Second World War, amid the growth of Malay nationalism and wider demands for access to education. Selection increasingly came to be based on academic achievement, although the college retained its role as a residential school for Malay boys from throughout the country.

The college was administered by British headmasters until 1965, when Abdul Aziz Ismail became its first Malay headmaster. Since that year, all its headmasters have been Malaysian.

Several writers and intellectuals taught at the college, including Malay scholar Zainal Abidin Ahmad, commonly known as Za'ba, and British novelist Anthony Burgess.

The college temporarily ceased operating during the Japanese occupation of Malaya, before reopening following the end of the war.

=== Traditions and institutional development ===
The Malay College Magazine was first published in 1939. The college's ceremonial Malay uniform, consisting of a white baju Melayu, black songkok and a distinctively patterned samping, was also introduced during this period. The uniform became compulsory under headmaster N. J. Ryan in 1959.

Although the institution was founded as a boys' school, two girls are recorded as having studied there during its history.

In October 1989, Queen Elizabeth II and Prince Philip, Duke of Edinburgh, visited the college during their state visit to Malaysia.

In 2004, a board of governors chaired by the then Raja Muda of Perak, Raja Nazrin Shah, was established for the college.

The college celebrated its centenary on 26 March 2005. The ceremony was attended by the Yang di-Pertuan Agong, the rulers of Perak, Selangor and Negeri Sembilan, and the governor of Malacca. During the celebrations, the college was proclaimed a national heritage institution.

On 10 June 2006, Emperor Akihito and Empress Michiko of Japan visited the college during a state visit to Malaysia.

On 30 May 2007, the Ministry of Education designated MCKK a cluster school. In 2010, it was selected as one of Malaysia's first High Performance Schools. The college's Preparatory School, established in 1913, celebrated its centenary in 2013.

== Buildings ==
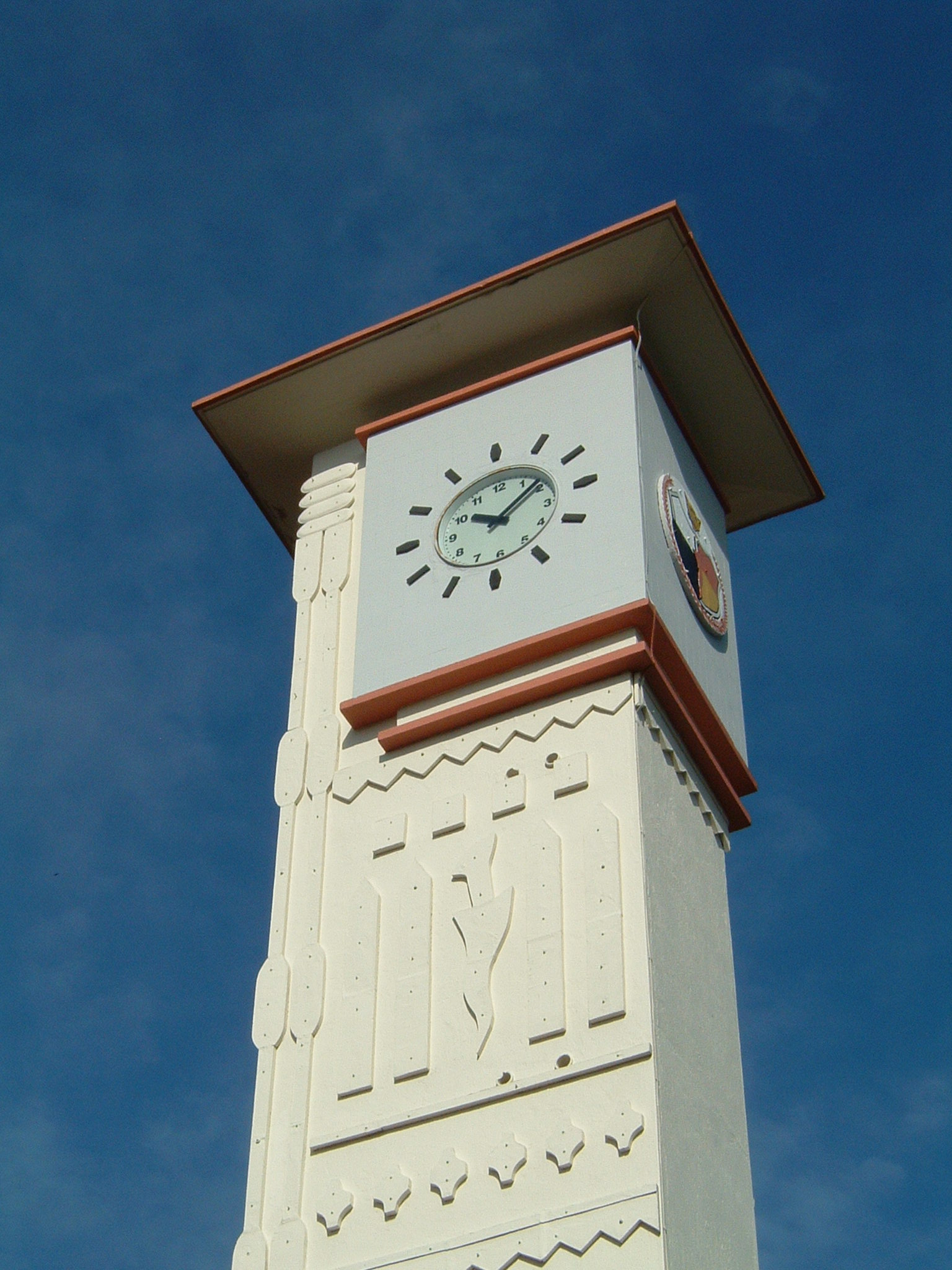
The Clock Tower

The most recognisable feature of the school is the Big School (built in 1909), a neoclassical building fronted by a rugby field. The school is built to accommodate 100 students initially, but in 1910, there were 139 boys in the School Register, 124 of them boarders. Thus, the planning for the construction of the Preparatory School was considered and it was referred to as the Sekolah Kechil. The block was completed by 1913 when it took in its first boarders. It was then referred to as the Prep School. It admitted boys who had completed Standard 4 and were being "prepared" for secondary school boarding experience by completing their Standard 5 and Form one at the Prep School. In 1955, the West and East Wing, as well as the administration block and Clock Tower were added. The administrative block (New School) was opened by High Commissioner for the Federation of Malaya, Donald MacGillivray, in 1955. The West and the East Wing, with the original Big School, make up what is now called the Big School. Dorms 1-6 are located in the East Wing, 7–16 in the Overfloor and 17–22 in the West Wing. Two more hostel blocks, the Pavilion and New Hostel were built in 1963 and 1972 respectively; the latter houses second formers. Another prominent feature of the school is the Big Tree, a rain tree (Samanea saman) in front of the East Wing that is said to be as old as the original Big School itself.

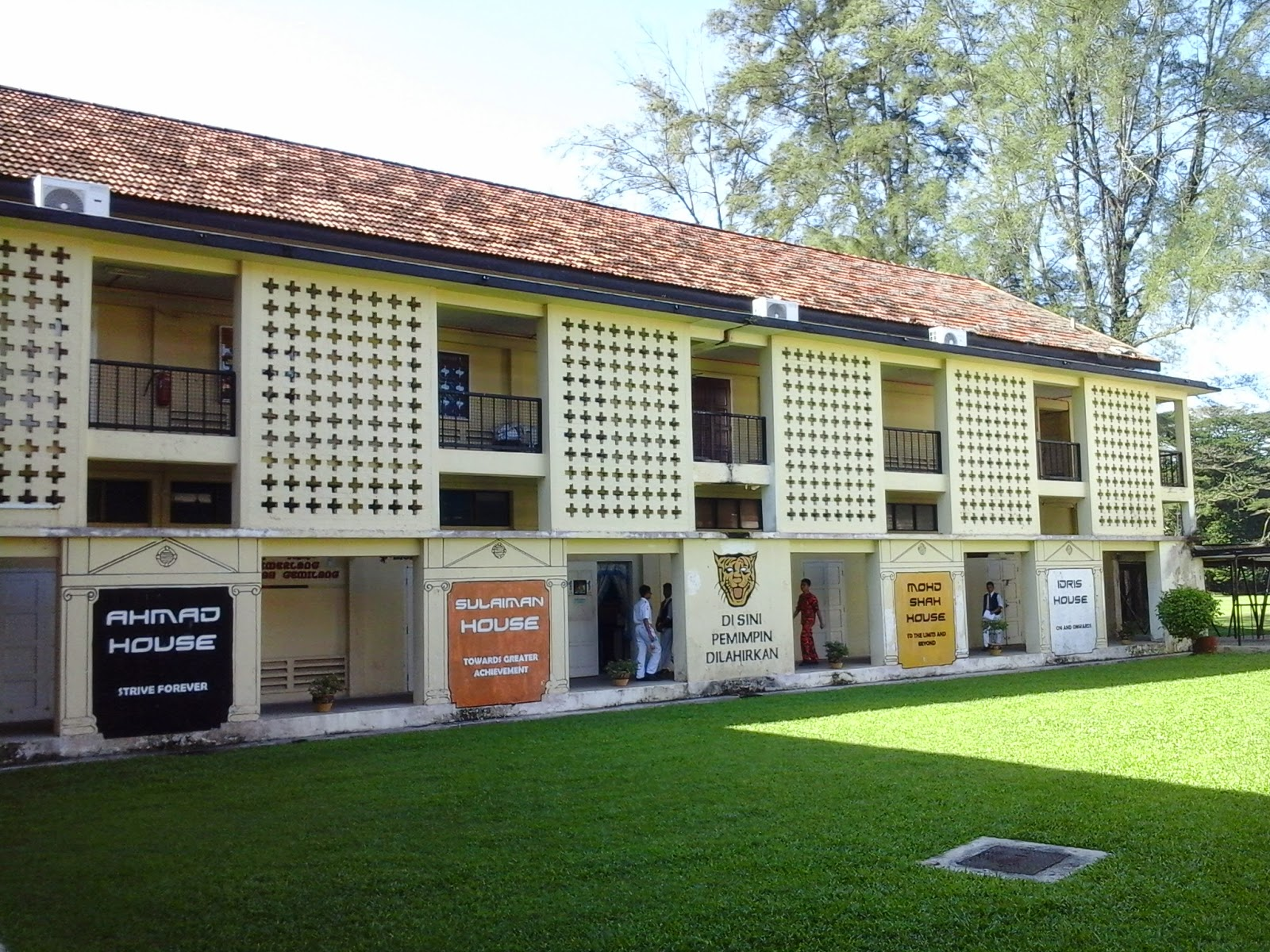
New School, Malay College

== The Magazine ==
The first college magazine was introduced back in 1939, and it has become a tradition ever since. There are some exceptions on certain years where the magazine was cancelled due to the country’s situations at the time. The most prominent example was from 1941-1946 when the school was closed due to the Japanese occupation of Malaya.

The body that is responsible for the production of the magazine is called The Malay College Editorial Board. It consists of a team of present students from Form 3 until Form 5 which is then split into 3 departments, the Finance Department, the Journalist Department and also the Designer & Media Department.

== Sports ==
The college ground is the only place in Asia where an Eton Fives court is found. The court is located on the south side of the Big School, nearby the IB World School campus. With the introduction of squash in 1938, Eton Fives began to lose popularity at the school until it was not played at all. Since a trip in August 2014 by the top UK coach Anthony Theodossi and his assistant, the game's popularity has grown and more students are now playing again. Since then, the students have competed in The Schools National Championships, United Kingdom at Highgate School, Eton College and Shrewsbury School. Every even-numbered years, an alumnus from Eton College will come to the school to teach the present boys the concept of Eton Fives and teaches them the basics.

The school is currently the best rugby school team in the nation. Nicknamed "MCKK All Blacks" after the New Zealand national team for its all black strip, they even perform the haka before matches. Traditionally, it has held match series against the Vajiravudh College of Thailand since 1960. In odd-numbered years, the match is held in Kuala Kangsar, on the school’s ground. In even-numbered years, it is held in Bangkok. In addition to this, MCKK competes with its prominent rivals every year in a multi-games carnival.

The school basketball team is called "MCKK Cagers" and won Piala Hamdan Tahir, the boarding-schools basketball championship, 21 times since 1977, the most in Malaysian history. MCKK debate teams have won Piala Perdana Menteri, the boarding-schools national debate, six times for Malay category and four times for English category.

=== Rivalries ===
MCKK has over the years established academic and sports rivalries with several premier schools, for example, Royal Military College, Victoria Institution, both in the capital Kuala Lumpur, King Edward VII School of Taiping, Sekolah Alam Shah in Putrajaya, and its neighbour, Clifford Secondary School. Notably, the most prominent rival is Sekolah Tuanku Abdul Rahman in Ipoh, which is one of the oldest Malay boarding school in Perak along with the MCKK.

== Alumni association ==
Old Boys Association logo

The alumni association of MCKK is known as the Malay College Old Boys' Association (MCOBA) and it was established in 1929. In 2009, the association enrolled its first non-Malay member, Liew Yong Choon. The alumni association is based in a dilapidated building called "Penthouse" of the MCOBA building on Jalan Syed Putra, Kuala Lumpur.

== Notable alumni ==
Notable Malay College Kuala Kangsar Alumni

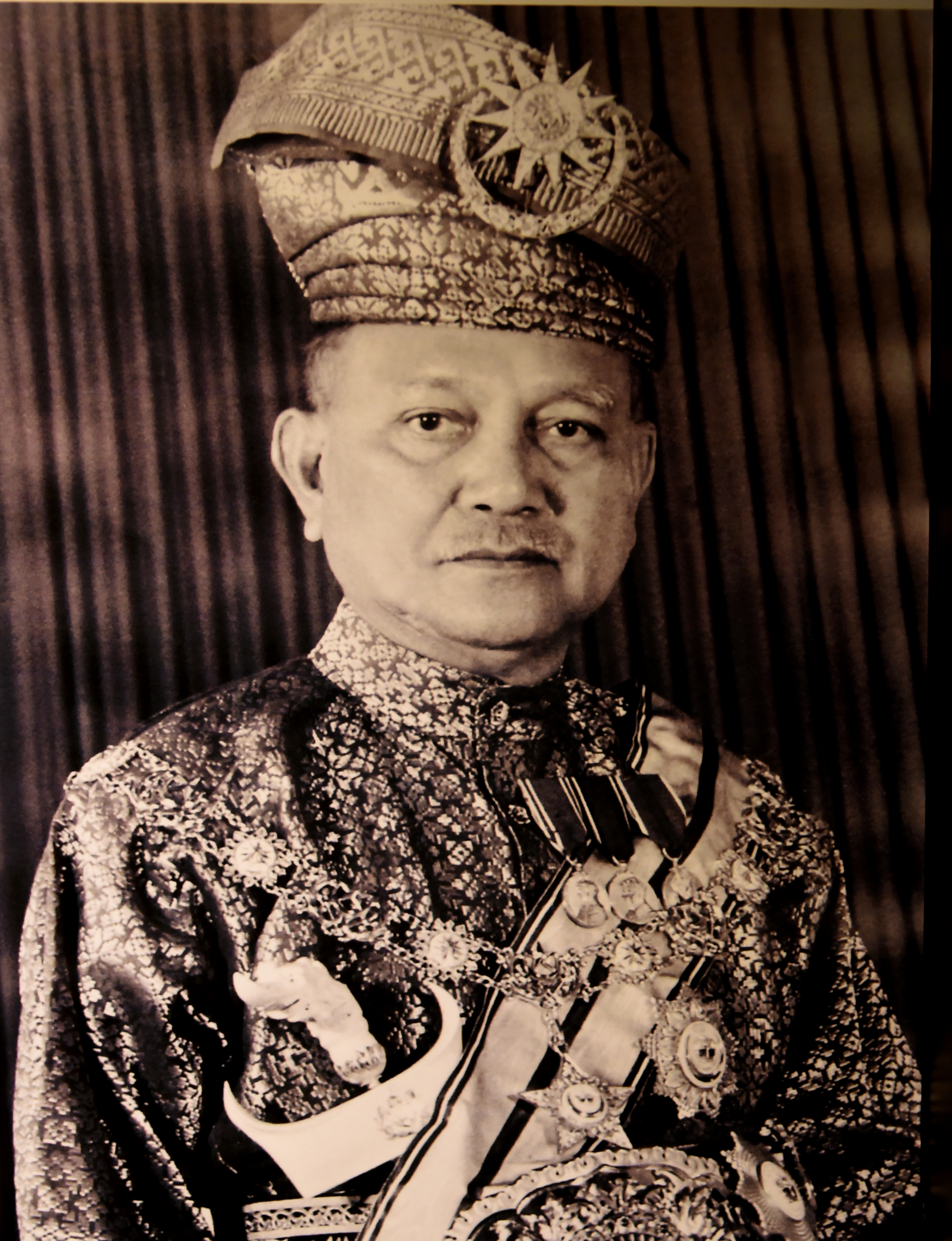
Abdul Rahman of Negeri Sembilan, 1st Yang di-Pertuan Agong of Malaysia

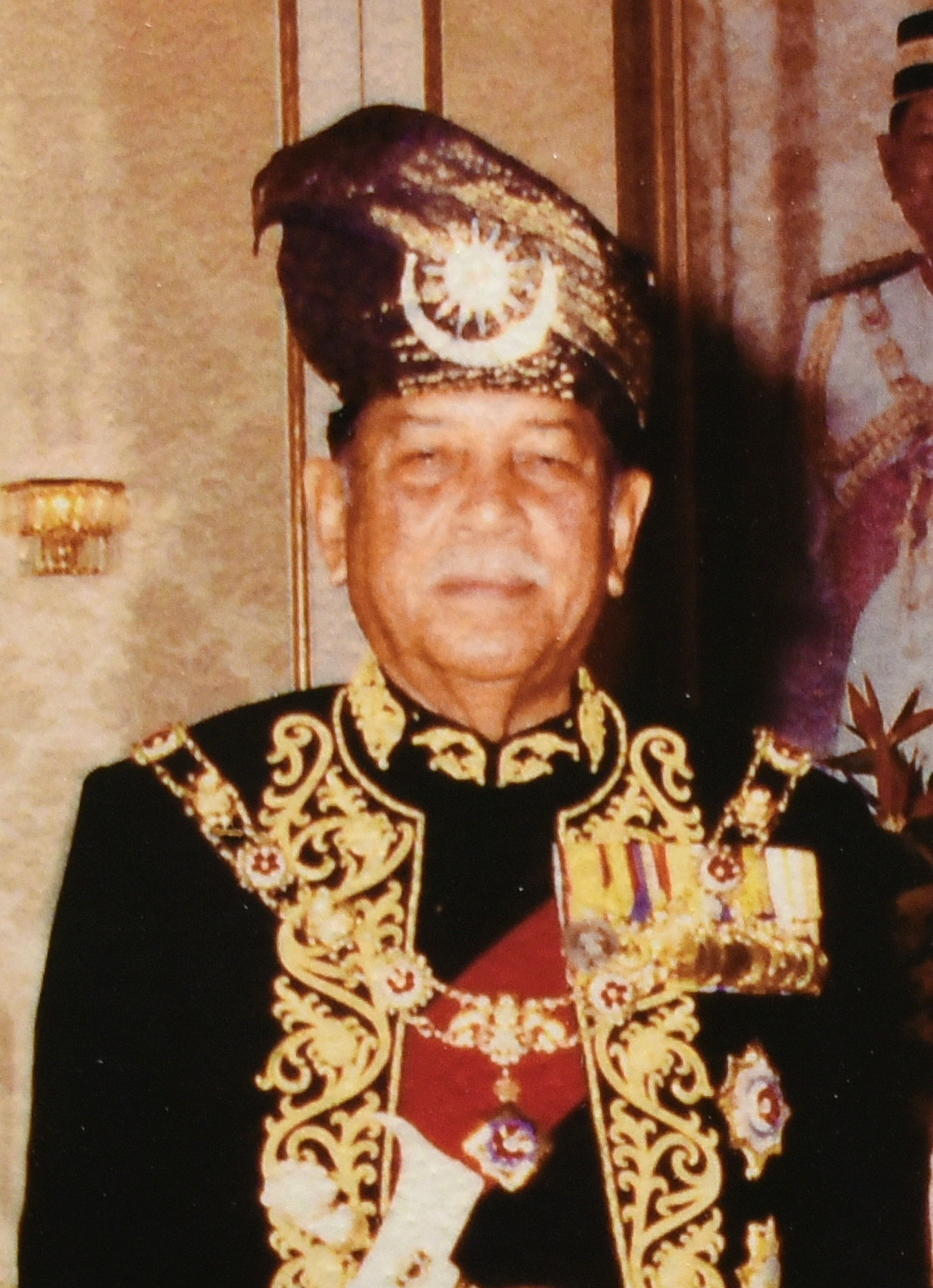
Ja'afar of Negeri Sembilan, 10th Yang di-Pertuan Agong of Malaysia

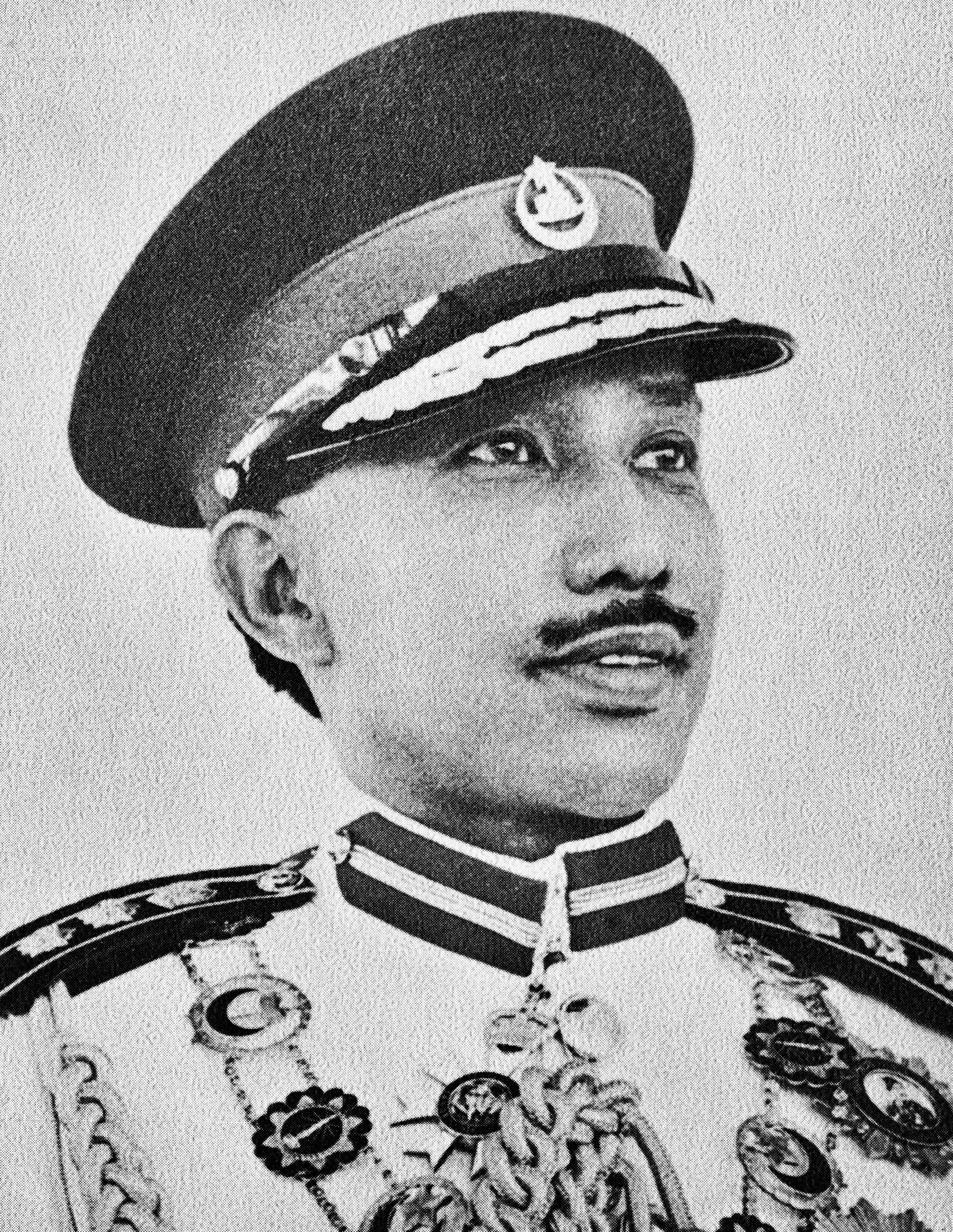
Omar Ali Saifuddien III, 29th Sultan of Brunei

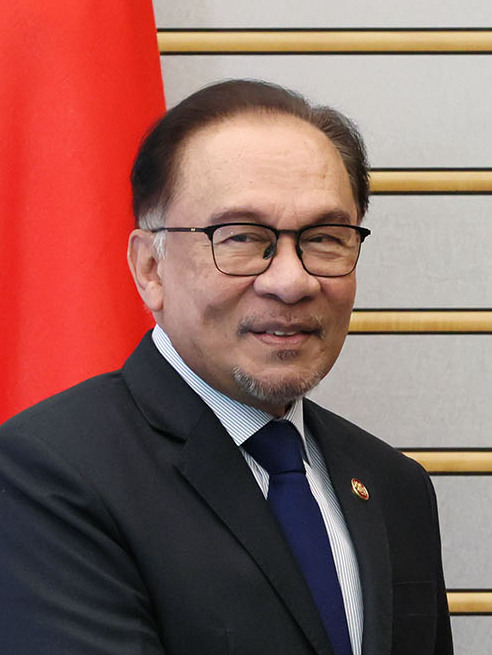
Anwar Ibrahim, 10th Prime Minister of Malaysia

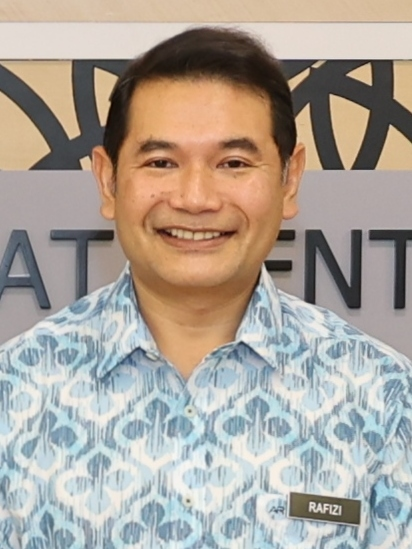
Rafizi Ramli, Former Malaysian Minister of Economy

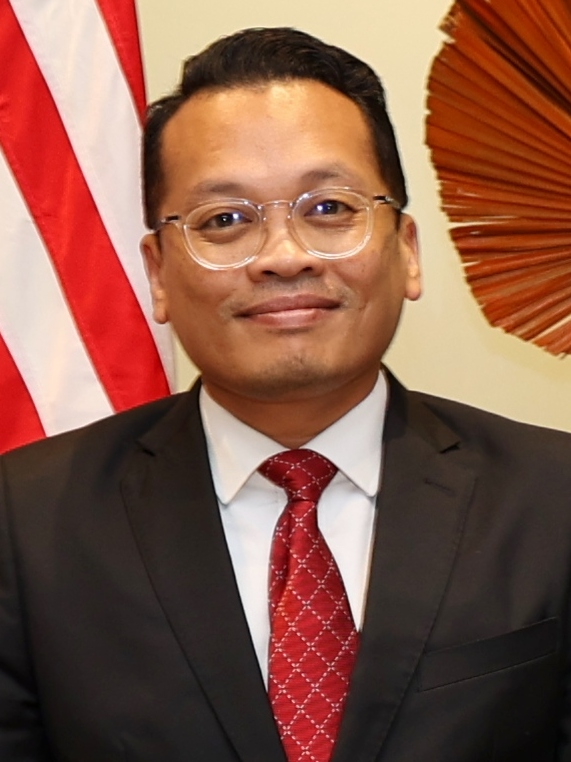
Nik Nazmi Nik Ahmad, Former Malaysian Minister of Natural Resources and Environmental Sustainability

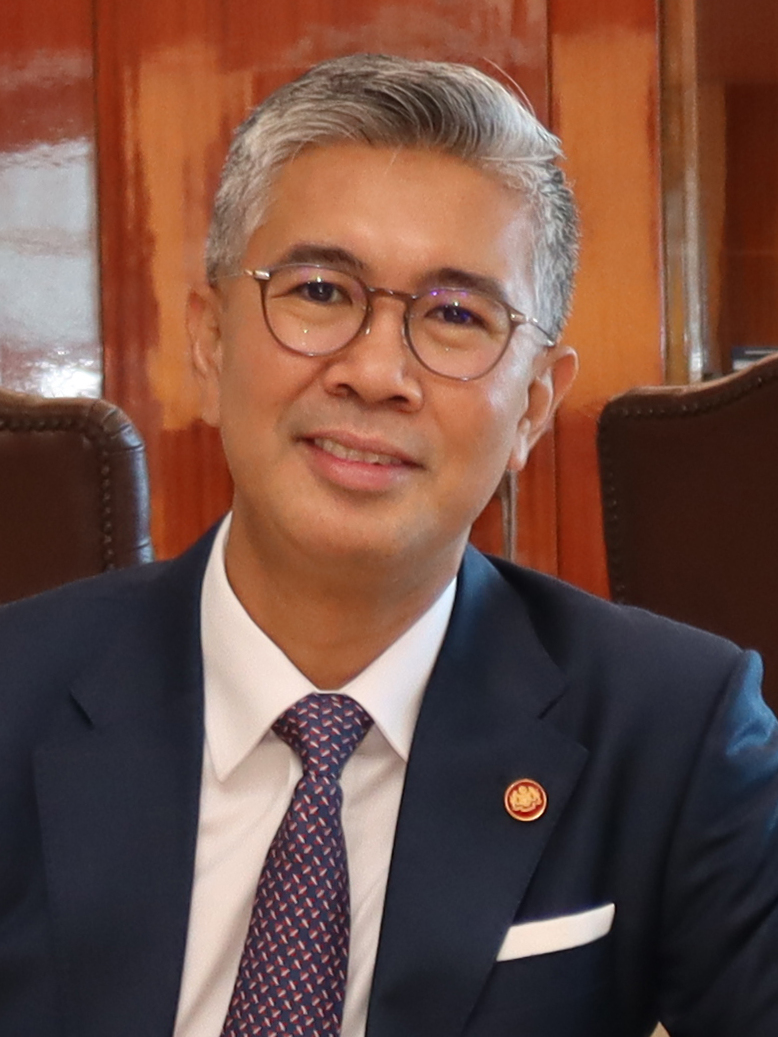
Tengku Zafrul Tengku Abdul Aziz, Former Malaysian Ministry of Investment, Trade and Industry, Current Senior Political Advisor

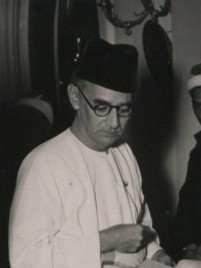
Onn Jaafar, 7th Menteri Besar of Johor

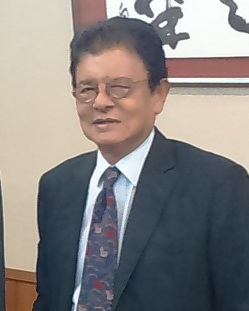
Razali Ismail, President of the United Nations General Assembly

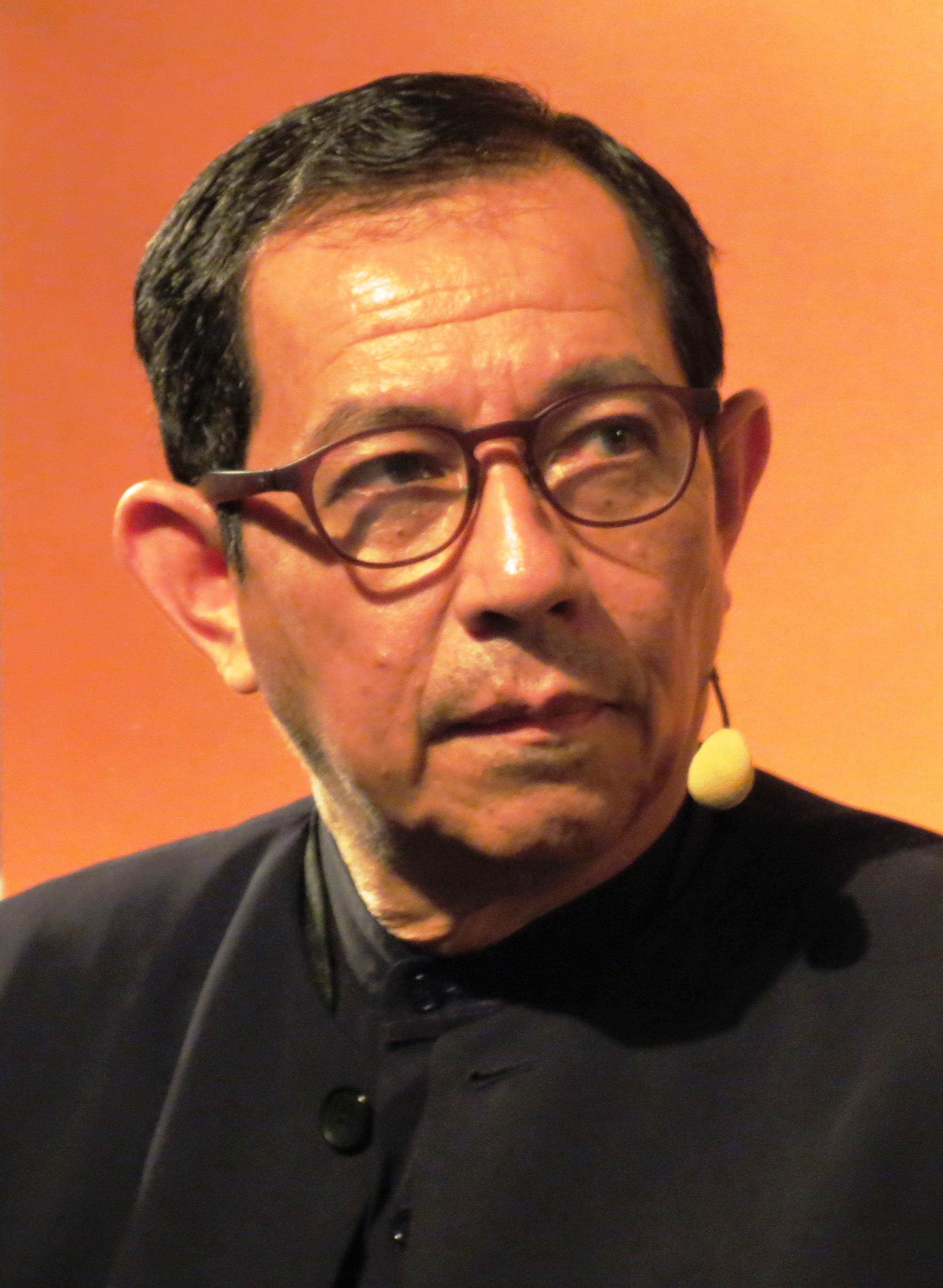
Dzulkifli Abdul Razak, Rector of the International Islamic University Malaysia

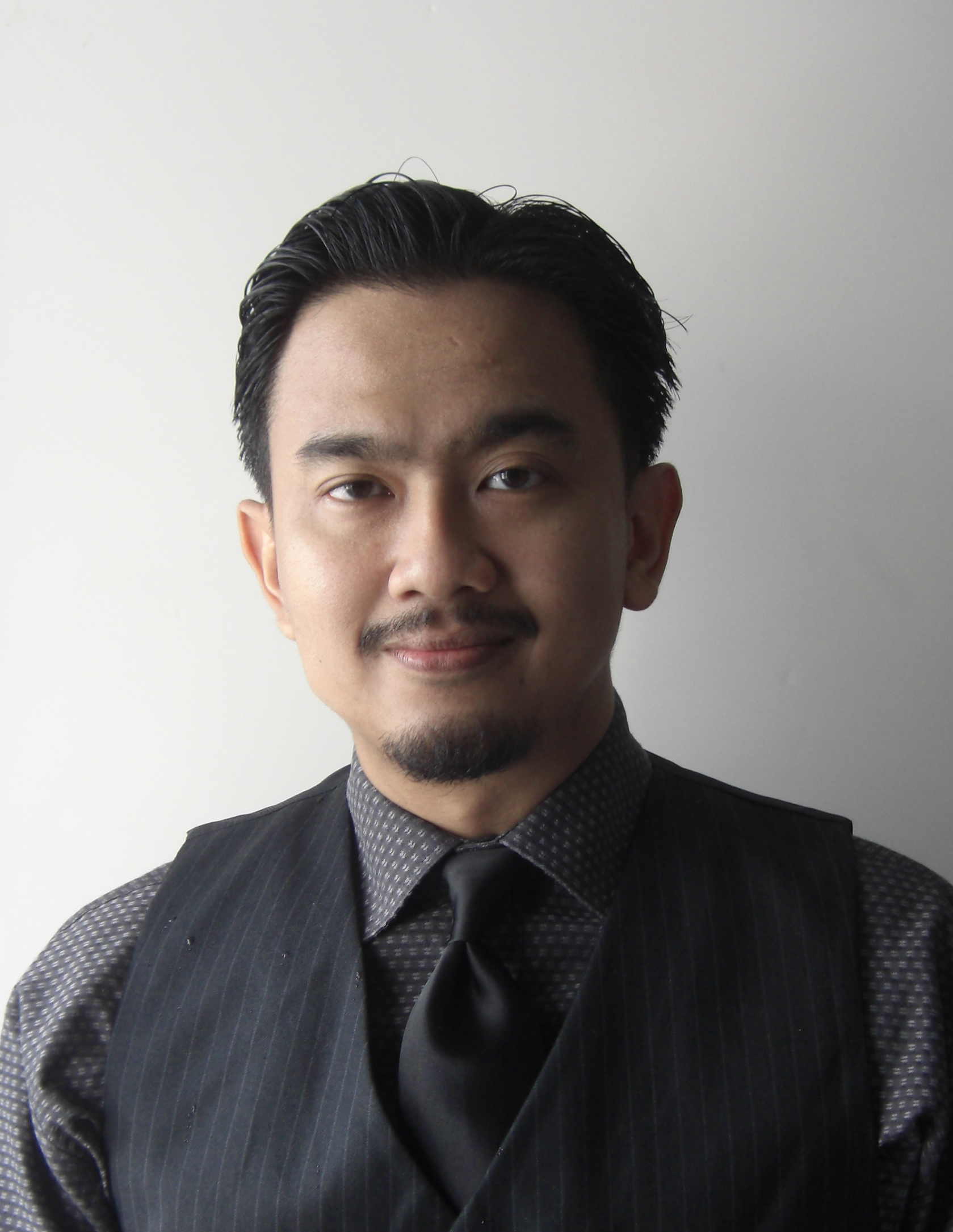
Sarly Adre Sarkum, Council Member of the Malaysian Institute of Architects

To this date, seven Yang di-Pertuan Agong out of seventeen that have ascended the throne were its alumni, including a Lord President of the Supreme Court and a Sultan of Brunei. Out of the four states that have Yang di-Pertua Negeri, two states have had at least one alumnus reside in office. The father of Malay nationalism and the founder of Malaysia's largest party is also an alumnus. Two Prime Ministers received their education in the college. The college also has produced two Speakers of the Dewan Rakyat. The college's Old Boys also showed their presence in economy, education, law, armed forces and art.

The novelist and composer Anthony Burgess (1917–93), author of The Long Day Wanes: A Malayan Trilogy, was a master at MCKK. He taught English and history and was housemaster at King's Pavilion, between 1956 and 1957, during the headmastership of J.D.R. "Jimmy" Howell. According to Burgess' This Man & Music, he wrote some music there under the influence of the country, notably Sinfoni Melayu for orchestra and brass band, which included cries of Merdeka (independence) from the audience. No score of any, however, has been delivered to posterity. The "Ode: Celebration for a Malay College", Burgess had written for the college's 50th anniversary in 1955, "was swiftly expunged from the school's choral repertoire", when "within months ... he had to leave the school after falling out with the headmaster, JD Howell. The following year Burgess published his first novel, Time for a Tiger. A thinly veiled account of his time at Kuala Kangsar, it so cruelly caricatured Howell and his colleagues that, as Burgess recalled in his autobiography, some of those who deemed themselves traduced 'sought advice about libel' from a local lawyer. The verses of the Ode have survived but not Burgess' original melody.

The college alumni were also noted as being influential in bringing the punk music into Malaysia.

== Headmasters ==
From	To	Headmasters
1905	1916	William Hargreaves
1917	1919	J.O. May
1920	1923	L.A.S. Jermyn
1923	1938	C. Bazell
1938	1949	H.R. Carey
1950	1953	K.D. Luke
1953	1958	J.D.R. Howell
1958	1960	P.G. Haig
1960	1965	Dato' N.J. Ryan
1965	1968	Dato' Abdul Aziz Ismail
1969	1971	Dato' Syed Abu Bakar Barakbah
1971	1973	Dato' Mohd. Ghazali Hj. Hanafiah
1973	1975	Nordin Nasir
1975	1977	Dato' Abdul Rahman Mohd Ali
1977	1982	Wan Abdul Aziz Wan Hamzah
1982	1984	Syed Alwi Syed Aljunid
1985	1987	Zainal Abidin Hj. Ahmad
1987	1992	Dato' Rashdi Ramlan
1992	1994	Dato' Hj. Hassan Hashim
1994	1999	Datuk Hj. Baharom Kamari
1999	2004	Tan Sri Hj. Alimuddin Hj. Mohd Dom
2004	2009	Dato' Hj. Mohd Rauhi Isa
2010	2018	Anand Baharuddin
2019	2024	Mohd Shahadan Abdul Rahman
2024	2026	Aimin Fadhlee Mahmud Zuhodi
2026	Present	Hj. Ahmad Salehin Hj. Sha’ari

== See also ==
- Education in Malaysia
- List of Malay College Kuala Kangsar alumni
