= State school =

Type of school funded in whole or in part by general taxation

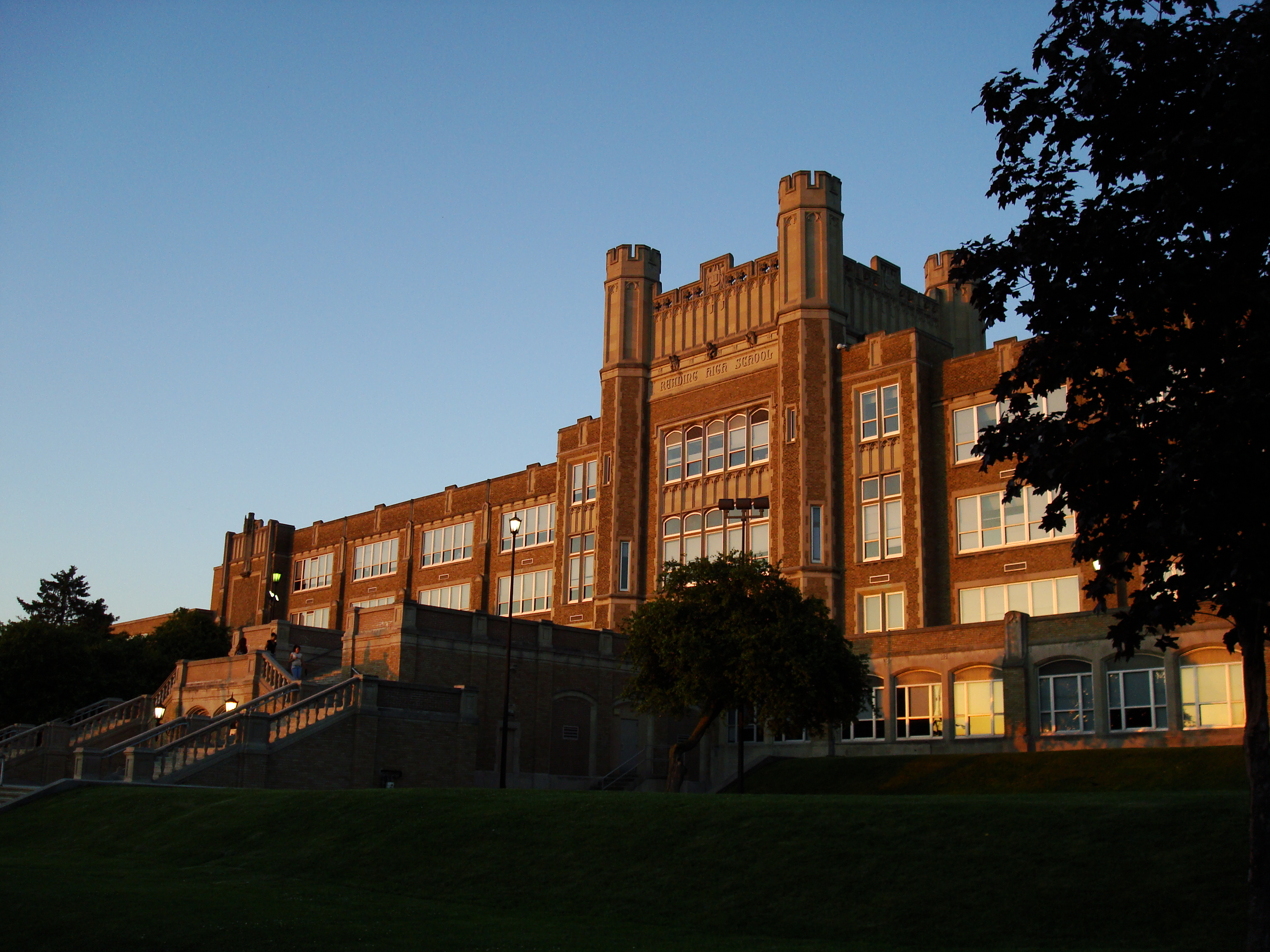
With 5,498 students as of the 2021–22 school year, Reading Senior High School in Reading, Pennsylvania, is the largest state school in Pennsylvania and one of the largest state schools in the United States.

A state school, public school, or government school is a primary or secondary school funded in whole or in part by taxation and operated by the government of the state. State-funded schools are global with each country showcasing distinct structures and curricula. Government-funded education spans from primary to secondary levels, covering ages 4 to 18. Alternatives to this system include homeschooling, private schools, charter schools, and other educational options. These schools are used in many countries to provide universal public education for free, for kindergarten, primary education, and secondary education.

== By region and country ==
=== Africa ===
==== South Africa ====
In South Africa, a state school or government school refers to a school that is state-controlled. These are officially called public schools according to the South African Schools Act of 1996, but it is a term that is not used colloquially. The Act recognised two categories of schools: public and independent. Independent schools include all private schools and schools that are privately governed. Independent schools with low tuition fees are state-aided and receive a subsidy on a sliding-scale. Traditional private schools that charge high fees receive no state subsidy. State schools are all state-owned, including section 21 schools, formerly referred to as "model C" or semi-private schools, that have a governing body and a degree of budget autonomy, as these are still fully owned and accountable to the state.

=== Americas ===
==== Canada ====
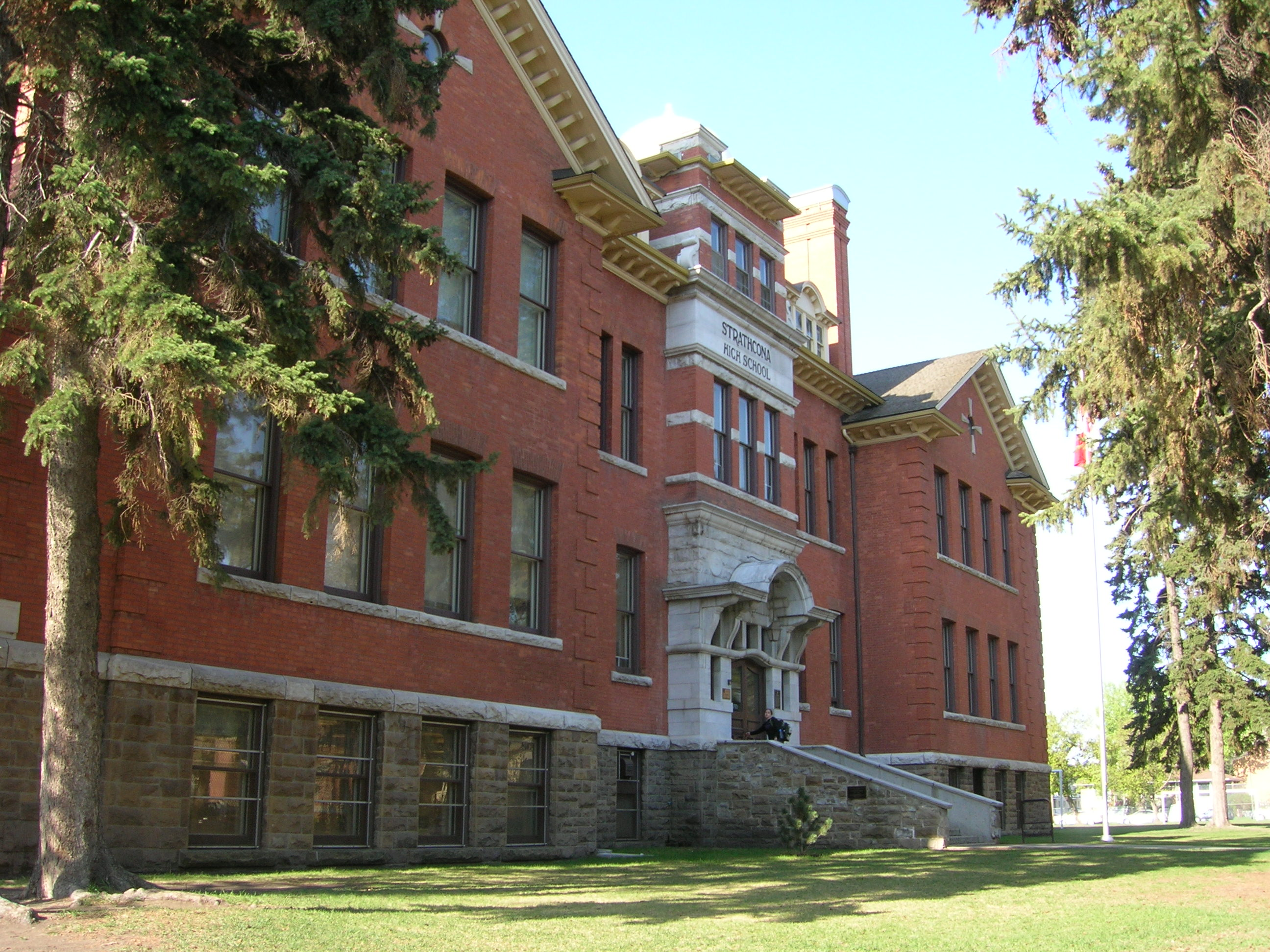
Old Scona High School in Edmonton, Alberta

Under the Canadian constitution, public-school education in Canada is a provincial responsibility and, as such, there are many variations among the provinces. Junior kindergarten or equivalent exists as an official program in Ontario and Quebec while kindergarten or equivalent is available in every province, but provincial funding and the level of hours provided varies widely. Starting at grade one, at about age six, there is universal Crown-funded access up to grade twelve, or the equivalent. Schools are generally divided into elementary schools (kindergarten to grade 8) and high schools (grades 9 to 12).

However, in many areas, middle schools are also provided and in some schools, particularly in rural areas, the elementary and middle levels can be combined into one school. In 2003, Grade 13, also known as the Ontario Academic Credit or "OAC" year, was eliminated in Ontario; it had previously been required only for students who intended to go on to university. Children are required to attend school until the age of sixteen in most provinces, while students in Ontario and New Brunswick must attend schools until the age of 18.

Some Canadian provinces offer segregated-by-religious-choice, but nonetheless Crown-funded and Crown-regulated, religiously based education. In Ontario, for example, Roman Catholic schools are known as "Catholic Schools" or "Separate Schools", not "Public Schools", although these are, by definition, no less "public" than their secular counterparts.

==== Latin America ====
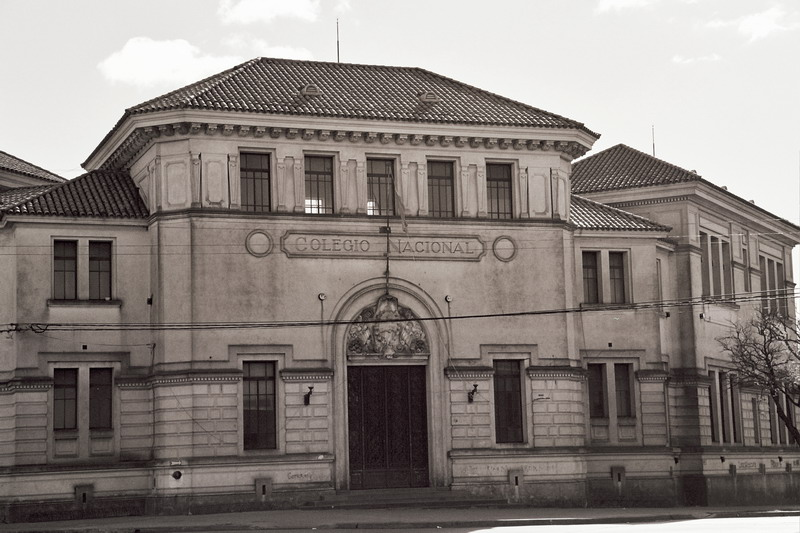
A secondary school in Bragado, Argentina

In some countries, such as Brazil and Mexico, the term public schools (escuelas públicas in Spanish, escolas públicas in Portuguese) is used for educational institutions owned by the federal, state, or city governments which do not charge tuition. Such schools exist in all levels of education, from the very beginning through post-secondary studies. Mexico has nine years of free and compulsory primary and secondary education.

Panama has 11 years of compulsory education, from pre-kindergarten to 9th grade, with children first entering at four or five years old and parents are required by law to give financial support to their children until they are 25 years old if they are studying.

Education in Argentina is a responsibility shared by the national government, the provinces and federal district and private institutions, though basic guidelines have historically been set by the Ministry of Education. Closely associated in Argentina with President Domingo Sarmiento's assertion that "the sovereign should be educated." The word "sovereign" refers to the people. Education has been extended nearly universally and its maintenance remains central to political and cultural debate. Even though education at all levels, including universities, has always been free, there are a large number of private schools and universities.

==== United States ====
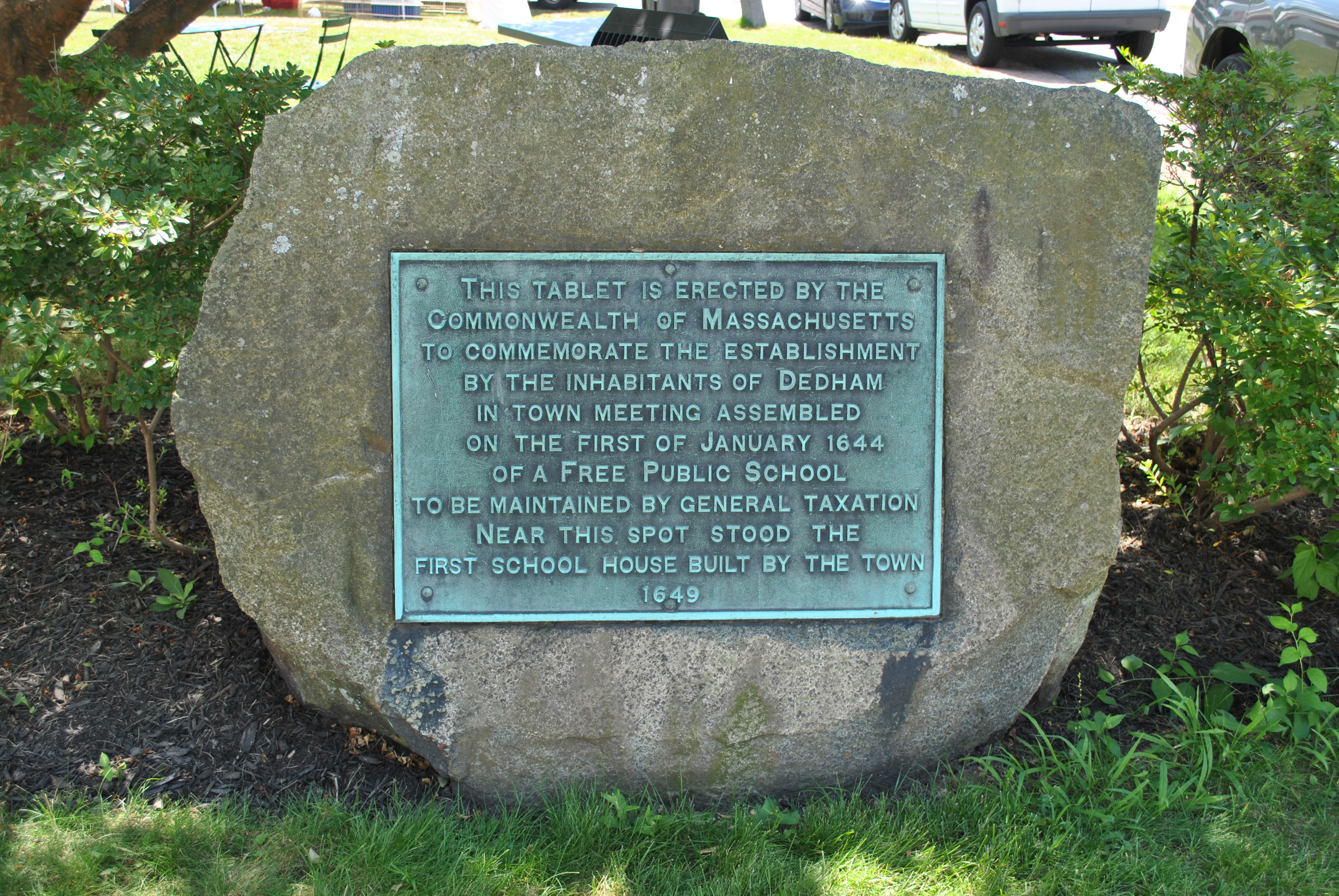
Stone plaque marking the site of the first public school in the United States, located in Dedham, Massachusetts

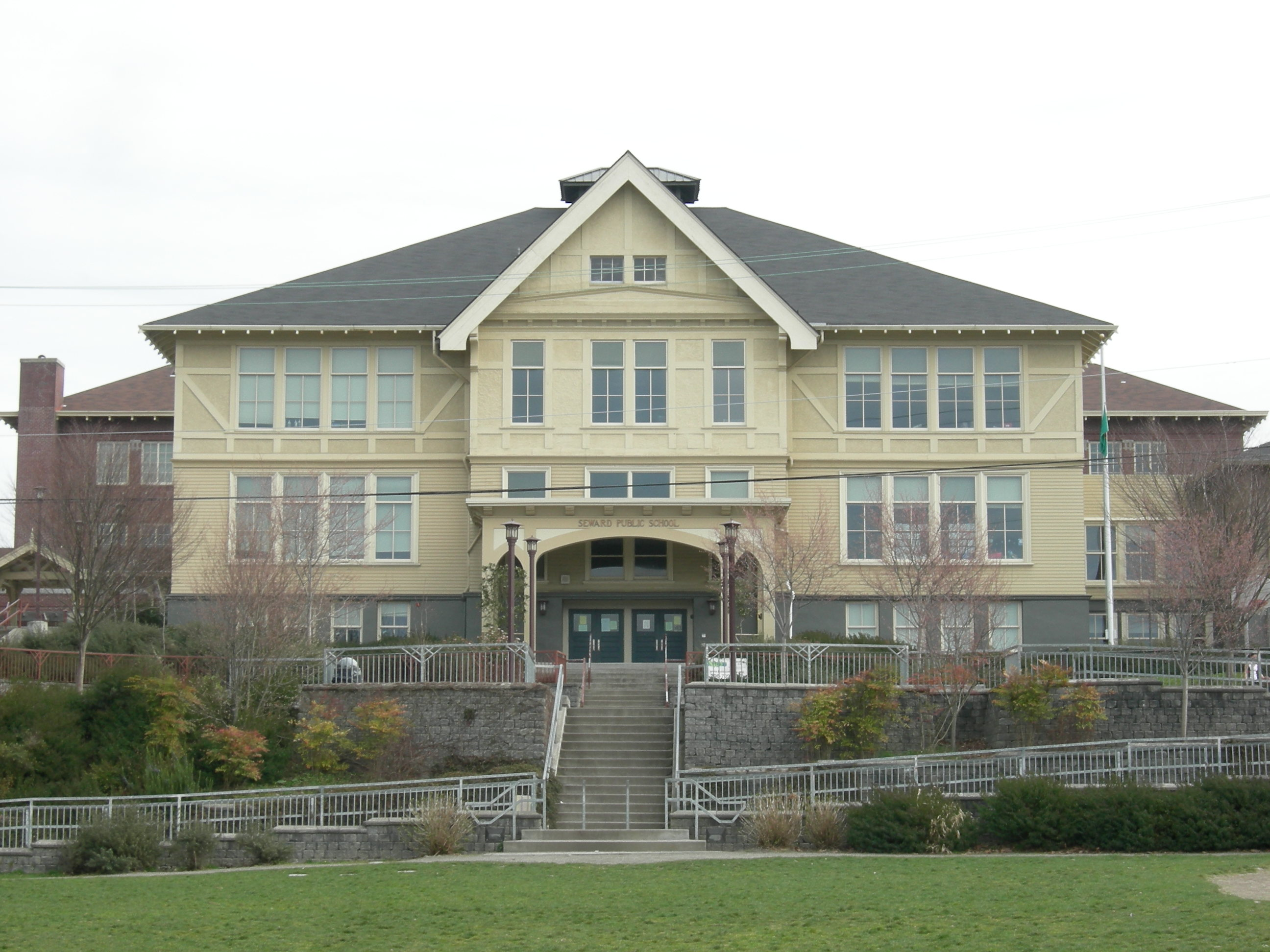
Seward School in Seattle

In the United States, the noun phrase public school is generally used for elementary, middle, or high schools (secondary schools) funded or run by a governmental entity, most commonly as local district of a U.S. state. "Private school" generally refers to primary, secondary and tertiary educational institutions that are not government-owned. Elementary, middle, and high schools that are operated by a religious organization are commonly called parochial schools, though, in practice, the term is generally used to refer only to schools operated by the Catholic Church or mainline denominations; the term "Christian school" is generally used to refer to schools operated by Evangelical, Pentecostal, Charismatic, or fundamentalist Christian churches. (The term "state school" is colloquial for state university, a tertiary college or university in a state university system.) The role of the U.S. federal government in education is limited and indirect. Direct control of education is a power reserved to the states under the Tenth Amendment to the United States Constitution because the U.S. Constitution does not explicitly or implicitly give the federal government authority to regulate education. However, any public or private school that accepts educational funding from the federal government, including participation in collegiate federal financial aid programs such as Pell Grants and Stafford Loans by accepting the funds or participating in a particular federal program, is subject to federal jurisdiction as a result of that participation.

The U.S. Department of Education, based in Washington, D.C., supervises the role of the federal government in education. Direct regulation of public, private, and parochial schools is done by state and territorial governments; schools in Washington, D.C., are regulated by the Government of the District of Columbia. Regulation of public schools is typically accomplished through a state education agency and a state department of education. There is usually a state superintendent of schools, who is appointed or elected to co-ordinate the state department of education, the state board of education, and the state legislature. Statewide education policies are disseminated to school districts or their equivalents. They are associated with counties, or with groups of counties, but their boundaries are not necessarily coterminous with county boundaries. The intermediate school districts encompass many local school districts. Local school districts operate with their own local boards, which oversee operations of the individual schools within their jurisdiction.

In most states, the county or regional intermediate school districts merely implement state education policy and provide the channels through which a local district communicates with a state board of education, state superintendent, and department of education. They do not establish county or regional policies of their own.

Local school districts are administered by local school boards, which operate public elementary and high schools within their boundaries. Public schools are often funded by local taxpayers, and most school boards are elected. However, some states have adopted new funding models that are not dependent upon the local economy.

Public schools are provided mainly by local governments. Curricula, funding, teaching, and other policies are set through locally elected school boards by jurisdiction over school districts. The school districts are special-purpose districts authorised by provisions of state law. Generally, state governments set minimum standards relating to almost all activities of elementary and high schools, as well as funding and authorisation to enact local school taxes to support the schools, primarily through real property taxes. The federal government funds aid to states and school districts that meet minimum federal standards. School accreditation decisions are made by voluntary regional associations. The first free public school in America was the Syms-Eaton Academy (1634) in Hampton, Virginia, and the first tax-supported public school in America was in Dedham, Massachusetts, founded by Rev. Ralph Wheelock. In the United States, 88% of students attend public schools, compared with 9% who attend parochial schools, 1% who attend private independent schools, and 2% who are homeschooled.

Public school is normally split up into three stages: elementary school (kindergarten to 5th or 6th grade), middle ("intermediate" or junior high school) from 5th, 6th, or 7th grade to 8th or 9th grade, and high school (9th or 10th to 12th grade). The middle school format is increasingly common in which the elementary school contains kindergarten or 1st grade to 5th or 6th grade and the middle School contains 6th or 7th and 8th grade. In addition, some elementary schools are splitting into two levels, sometimes in separate buildings: elementary school (usually K–2) and intermediate (3–5). Some middle schools are different.

The K–8 format is also an emerging popular concept in which students may attend only two schools for all of their K–12 education. Many charter schools feature the K-8 format in which all elementary grades are housed in one section of the school, and the traditional junior high school students are housed in another section of the school. Some very small school districts, primarily in rural areas, still maintain a K–12 system in which all students are housed in a single school. A few 7–12 schools also exist.

In the United States, institutions of higher education that are operated and subsidised by the states are also referred to as "public". However, unlike public high schools, public universities usually charge tuition, but fees are usually much lower than those charged by private universities, particularly for students who meet in-state residency criteria. Community colleges, state colleges, and state universities are examples of public institutions of higher education. In particular, many state universities are regarded as among the best institutions of higher education in the US but usually are surpassed in ranking by certain private universities and colleges, such as those of the Ivy League, which are often very expensive and extremely selective in the students they accept. In several states, the administrations of public universities are elected via the general electoral ballot.

=== Asia ===
==== Bangladesh ====
Public or Government-funded schools are found throughout Bangladesh. They are referred to as 'Government High School'. These schools mostly teach students from Year 1 to 10, with examination for students in year 10. All public schools follow the National Board Curriculum. Many children, especially girls, drop out of school after completing the 5th Year in remote areas. In larger cities such as Dhaka and Chittagong, however, this is fairly uncommon. Many good public schools conduct an entrance exam, although most public schools in the villages and small towns usually do not. Public schools are often the only option for parents and children in rural areas, but there are large numbers of private schools in Dhaka and Chittagong. Many Bangladeshi private schools teach their students in English and follow curricula from overseas, but in public schools lessons are taught in Bengali.

==== China ====
In China, state schools are funded and administered by the education sector within the government. Although some, especially high schools, have started to charge a fair portion of parents of students an additional tuition fee, due to the increased places offered by the schools in recent years. Top state schools are often very selective, however. Students who miss their entrance requirement may still gain places if they meet a relatively lower requirement and their parents are willing to pay for the additional fees. Some parents appreciate the idea as they may send their children to good schools even though they may not be academically qualified, while others believe that it is not fair for someone who has a background of poverty.

The public spending on schools in China has been uneven due to insufficient investment in education. This condition is in favour of urban schools and it is promoted by past policies such as the mandate for rural public schools to have a higher student-to-teacher ratio. The inequality of resources is exacerbated by the way public schools in urban areas enjoy more support since local governments have more developed economies. Aside from the disparity between urban and rural public schools, there was also the dichotomized system adopted since 1978, which divided schools into two groups: key schools (zhongdianxiao) and non-key schools (putongxiao).

Key schools receive more funding due to the goal of developing first-class education in a limited number of schools in a short period of time. The key school system was cancelled by the 2006 amendment to the Compulsory Education Law, along with the introduction of reforms that address education inequality.

==== Hong Kong ====
In Hong Kong the term government schools is used for free schools funded by the government. There are also subsidised schools, which are the majority in Hong Kong and many of which are run by religious organisations, Direct Subsidy Scheme schools, private schools and international schools in Hong Kong. Some schools are international schools, which are not subsidised by the government.

==== India ====
During British rule, a number of state higher education establishments were set up (such as universities in Chennai, Kolkata, and Mumbai), but little was done by the British in terms of primary and secondary schooling. Other indigenous forms of education are being revived in various ways across India. According to current estimates, 80% of all Indian schools are government schools making the government the major provider of education. However, because of the poor quality of public education, 27% of Indian children are privately educated. According to some research, private schools often provide superior educational results at a fraction of the unit cost of government schools. The teacher to student ratio is usually much lower in private schools than in the government ones, creating more competitive students. Education in India is provided by the public sector as well as the private sector, with control and funding coming from three levels: federal, state, and local. The Nalanda University was the oldest university-system of education in the world. Western education became ingrained into Indian society with the establishment of the British Raj.

==== Indonesia ====
Education in Indonesia is overseen by two government ministries: the Ministry of Education and Culture for all education matters up to the tertiary education, and the Ministry of Religious Affairs for Islamic school matters up to the tertiary education. Education may be obtained from state schools, private schools, or through homeschooling. There is a 12-year compulsory education program from the government. The Indonesian educational system is divided into three stages:

- primary education (pendidikan dasar)
- secondary education (pendidikan menengah)
- tertiary education (perguruan tinggi)

==== Japan ====
Most students attend public schools through the lower secondary level, but private education is popular at the upper secondary and university levels.

==== South Korea ====
The first public education system on record was put in place during the Koryo Dynasty. The national school system was put in place under Hak-Je (Korean: 학제; Hanja: 學制; lit. 'Education Policy') enacted by King Seong Jong, which was modelled after the public education systems of the Song and Tang Dynasties in China. Hak-Je involved operating national universities, called Gukjagam in the capital and called HyangAk in other regions. In King SeongJong Year 6, 987 A.D., a pair of a medical doctor and a scholarly doctor were appointed to administer academic systems and curriculums at Hyang-Ak: scholarly education included subjects of geography, history, math, law, and others. In King SeongJong Year 11, 992 A.D., the first known national public schools called Ju-Hak (Korean: 주학; Hanja: 州學) were opened in each Ju and Gun, states and counties, to improve nationwide academic performances.

After the ceasefire agreement for the civil war was declared, north and south states of Korea established their own education system. In South Korea, education in public schools (1–12) is compulsory with the exception of kindergarten. All aspects of public education are the responsibility of the Ministry of Education, which executes administration of schools, allocation of funding, certification of teachers and schools, and curriculum development with standardised textbooks across the country. In 2000, South Korea spent 4.2% of its GDP in education. As of the 2007 United Nations Education Index, South Korea was ranked eighth in the world.

==== Malaysia ====
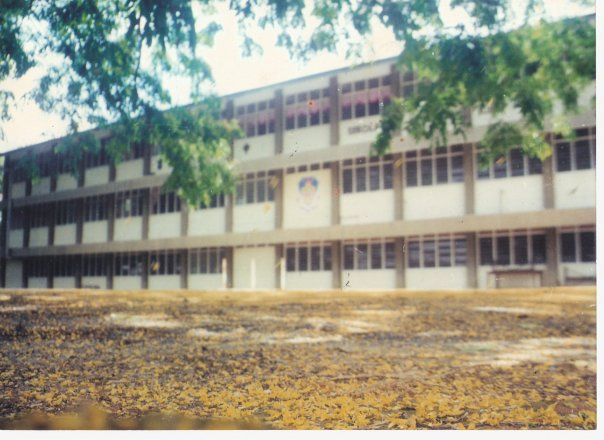
Chio Min Secondary School in Kulim, Malaysia

Education in Malaysia is overseen by two government ministries: the Ministry of Education for matters up to the secondary level, and the Ministry of Higher Education for tertiary education. Although education is the responsibility of the federal government, each state has an Education Department (which is in turn a local branch of the federal education ministry) to help coordinate educational matters in their respective states. The main legislation governing education is the Education Act of 1996. Education may be obtained from government-sponsored schools, private schools, or through homeschooling. By law, primary education is compulsory. As in other Asian countries such as Singapore and China, standardized tests are a common feature.

==== Philippines ====
Philippines has had a public education system since 1863 and is the oldest in Asia. It was created during the Spanish colonization of the islands and mandated the establishment of a school for boys and a school for girls in every municipality. The modern public schools in the Philippines are run by the Department of Education. Some public schools collect miscellaneous school fees to fund school extra-curricular activities or to improve school equipment and services.

==== Sri Lanka ====
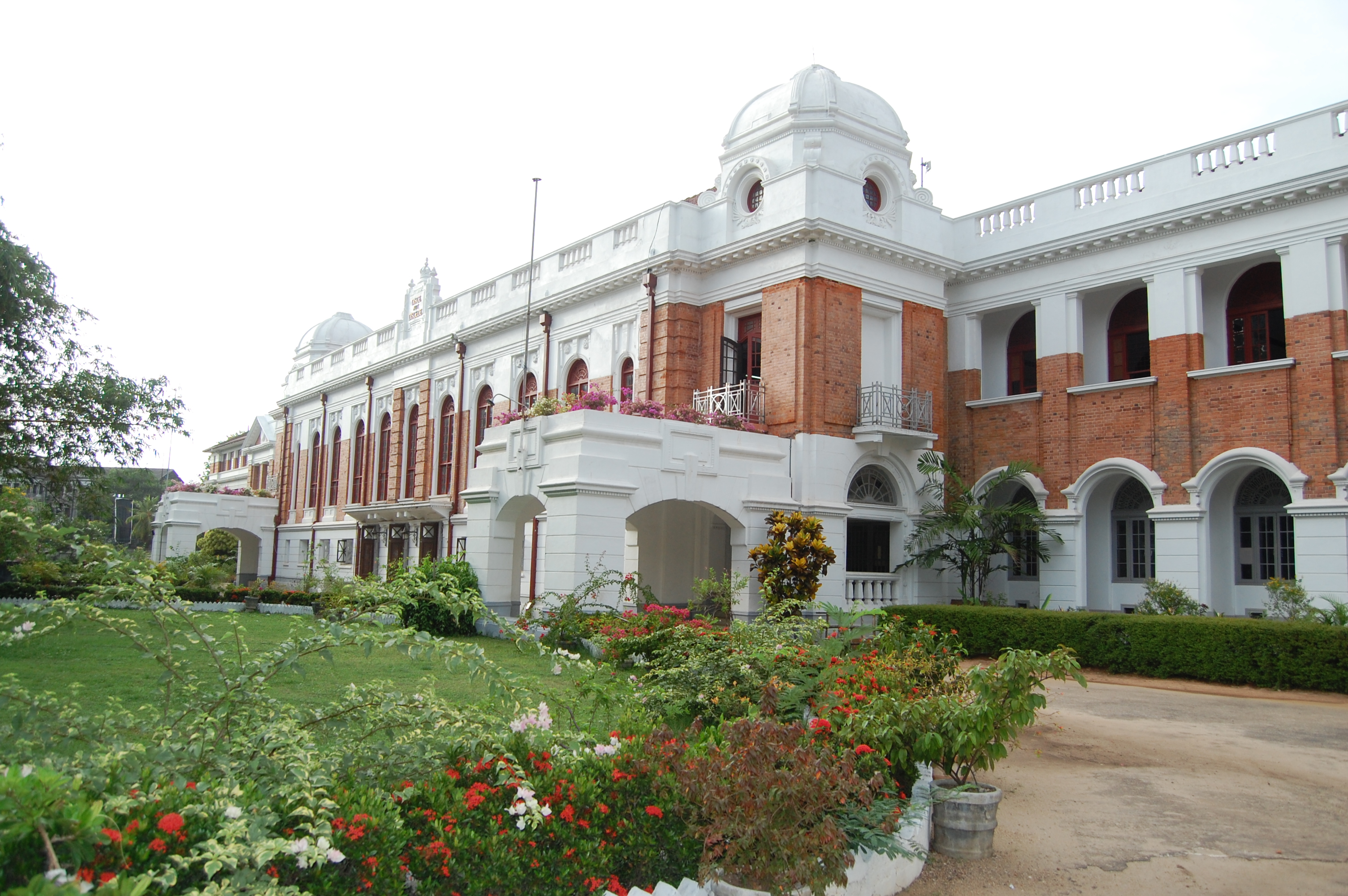
Royal College, Colombo

Most of the schools in Sri Lanka are maintained by the government as a part of the free education. With the establishment of the provincial council system in the 1980s the central government handed control of most schools to local governments. However the old schools which had been around since the colonial times were retained by the central government, thus creating three types of government schools: National Schools, Provincial Schools, and Piriven.

National Schools come under the direct control of the Ministry of Education therefore have direct funding from the ministry. Provincial Schools consists of the vast majority of schools in Sri Lanka which are funded and controlled by the local governments. Piriven are monastic college (similar to a seminary) for the education of Buddhist priests. These have been the centres of secondary and higher education in ancient times for lay people as well. Today these are funded and maintained by the Ministry of Education.

=== Europe ===
==== Denmark ====
The Danish school system is supported today by tax-based governmental and municipal funding from day care through primary and secondary education to higher education and there are no tuition fees for regular students in public schools and universities. The Danish public primary schools, covering the entire period of compulsory education, are called folkeskoler (literally 'people's schools' or 'public schools'). The folkeskole consists of a pre-school class (mandatory since 2009), the 9-year obligatory course and a voluntary 11th year. It thus caters for pupils aged 6 to 17. It is also possible for parents to send their children to various kinds of private schools. These schools also receive government funding, although they are not public. In addition to this funding, these schools may charge a fee from the parents.

==== England ====
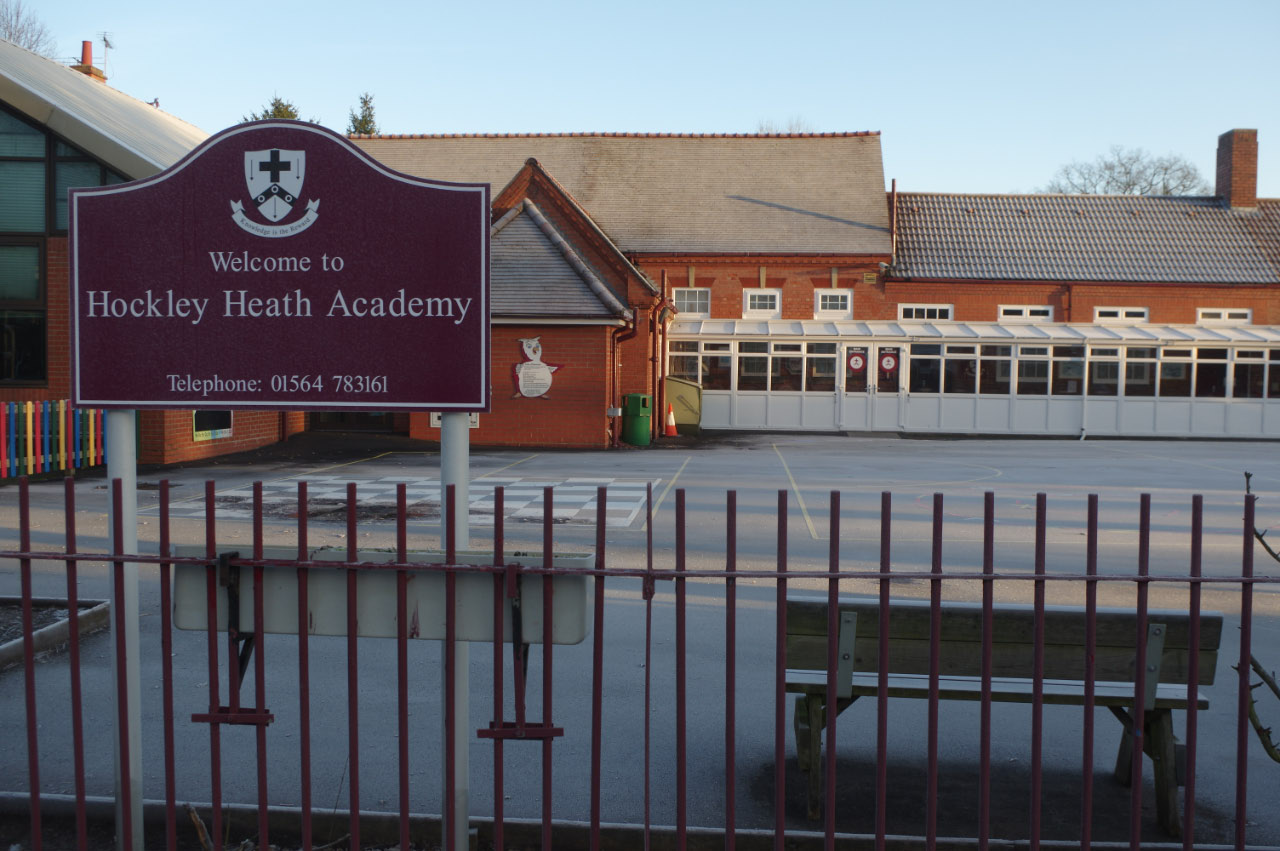
Hockley Heath Academy in Hockley Heath, a mixed primary school with academy status

England has a strong state-funded school system. There are a number of categories of English state-funded schools including academy schools, community schools, faith schools, foundation schools, free schools, grammar schools, maths schools, studio schools, university technical colleges, state boarding schools and City Technology Colleges.

About one third of English state-funded schools are faith schools; i.e. affiliated with religious groups, most often from the Church of England (approximately 2/3 of faith schools), or the Roman Catholic Church (around 3/10). There are also schools affiliated to other Christian churches; in 2011, there were 42 Jewish, 12 Muslim, 3 Sikh and 1 Hindu faith schools. These faith schools include sub-categories such as faith-academy schools, voluntary aided schools, and voluntary controlled schools: most voluntary controlled schools are faith schools.

All of these are funded through national and local taxation. All state-funded schools in England are required to follow the National Curriculum, which is made up of twelve subjects. Every state school must offer a curriculum which is balanced and broadly based and which promotes the spiritual, moral, cultural, mental and physical development of pupils at the school and of society, and prepares pupils at the school for the opportunities, responsibilities and experiences of later life.

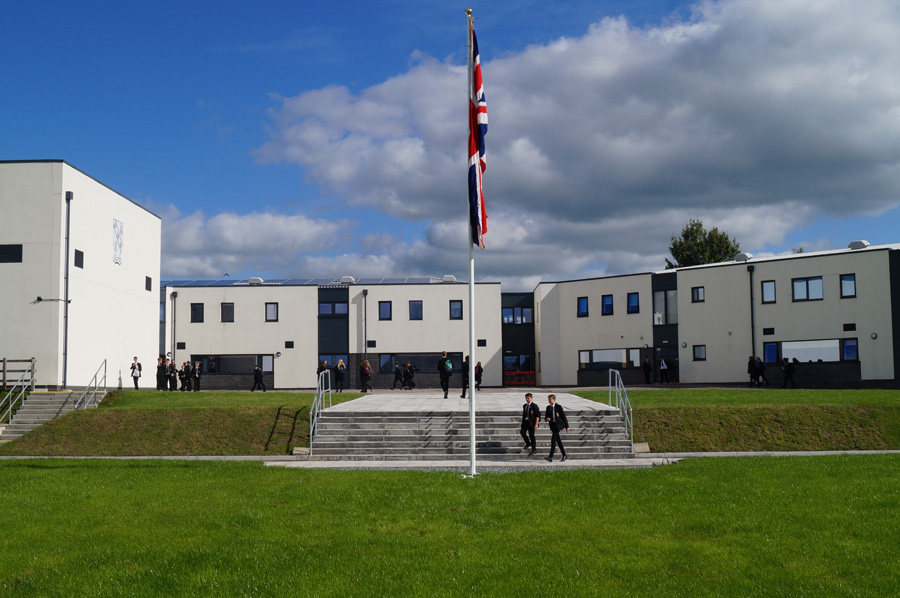
Chulmleigh College in Chulmleigh, a mixed coeducational secondary state school with academy status

For each of the statutory curriculum subjects, the Secretary of State for Education is required to set out a Programme of Study which outlines the content and matters which must be taught in those subjects at the relevant Key Stages. Teachers should set high expectations for every pupil. They should plan stretching work for pupils whose attainment is significantly above the expected standard. Teachers should use appropriate assessment to set targets which are deliberately ambitious.

A high number of state-funded secondary schools are specialist schools, receiving extra funding to develop one or more subjects in which the school specialises, such as Cirencester Deer Park School which currently has 5 specialisms. State schools may request payment from parents for extracurricular activities such as swimming lessons and field trips, provided these charges are voluntary.

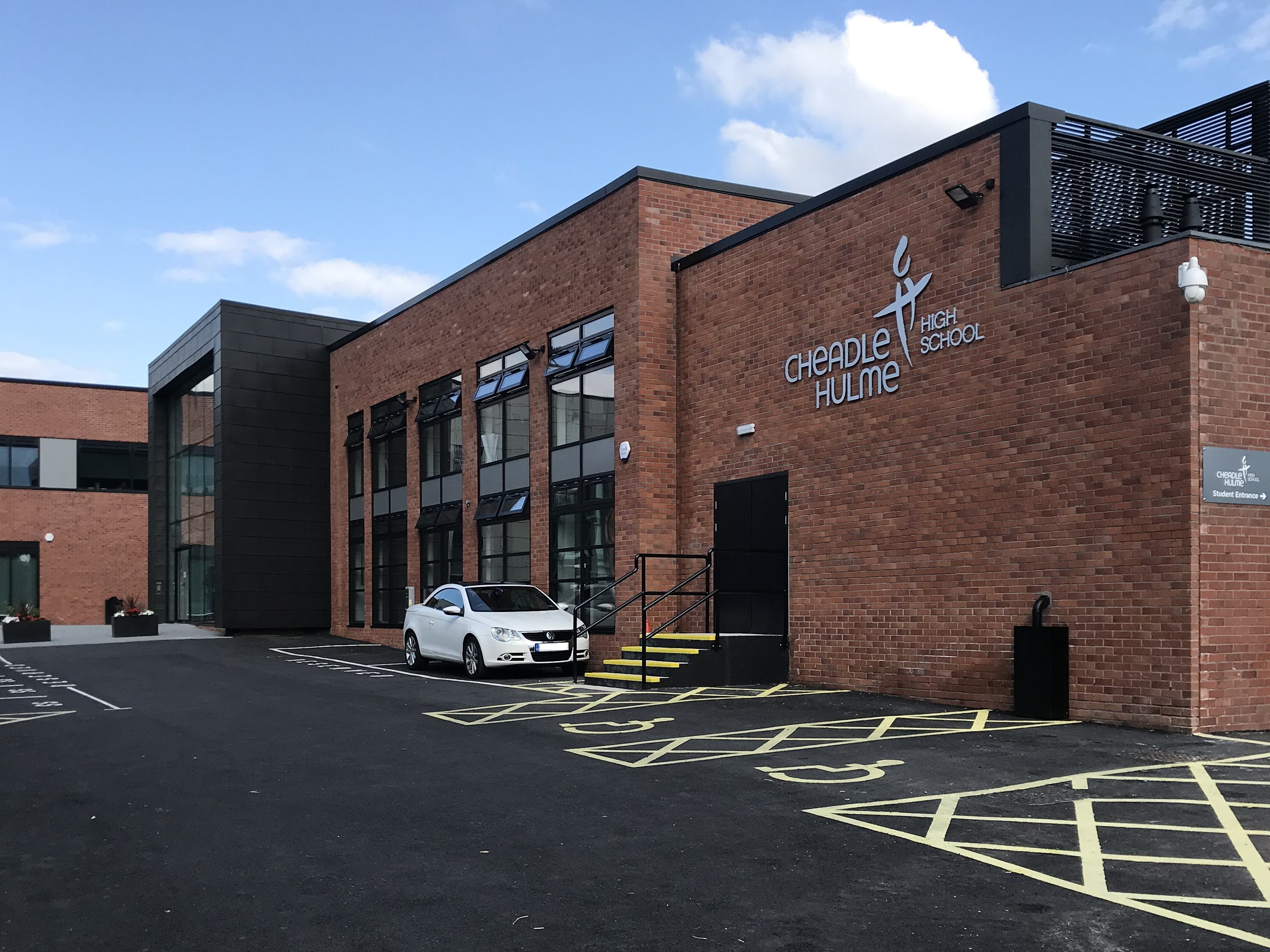
Cheadle Hulme High School in Cheadle Hulme, an 11–18 mixed coeducational secondary school with academy status

Comprehensive schools typically describe secondary schools for pupils aged approximately 11–18, that do not select its intake on the basis of academic achievement or aptitude, in contrast to a selective school system where admission is restricted on the basis of selection criteria, usually academic performance. The term is commonly used in relation to England and Wales, where comprehensive schools were introduced as state schools on an experimental basis in the 1940s and became more widespread from 1965. About 90% of English secondary school pupils attend a comprehensive state school. Comprehensive schools provide an entitlement curriculum to all children, without selection whether due to financial considerations or attainment. A consequence of that is a wider ranging curriculum, including practical subjects such as design and technology and vocational learning.

Technical education in state schools are introduced during the secondary school years and goes on into further education (FE) and higher education (HE). Further education incorporates vocational oriented education as well as a combination of general secondary education. Students can also go on to a further education college or sixth form college to prepare themselves for a wide range of apprenticeships and study. Major provider of vocational qualifications include the Business and Technology Education Council, City and Guilds of London Institute and Edexcel. Higher National Certificates and Higher National Diplomas typically require 1 and 2 years of full-time study and credit from either HNE or Diplomas can be transferred toward an undergraduate degree.

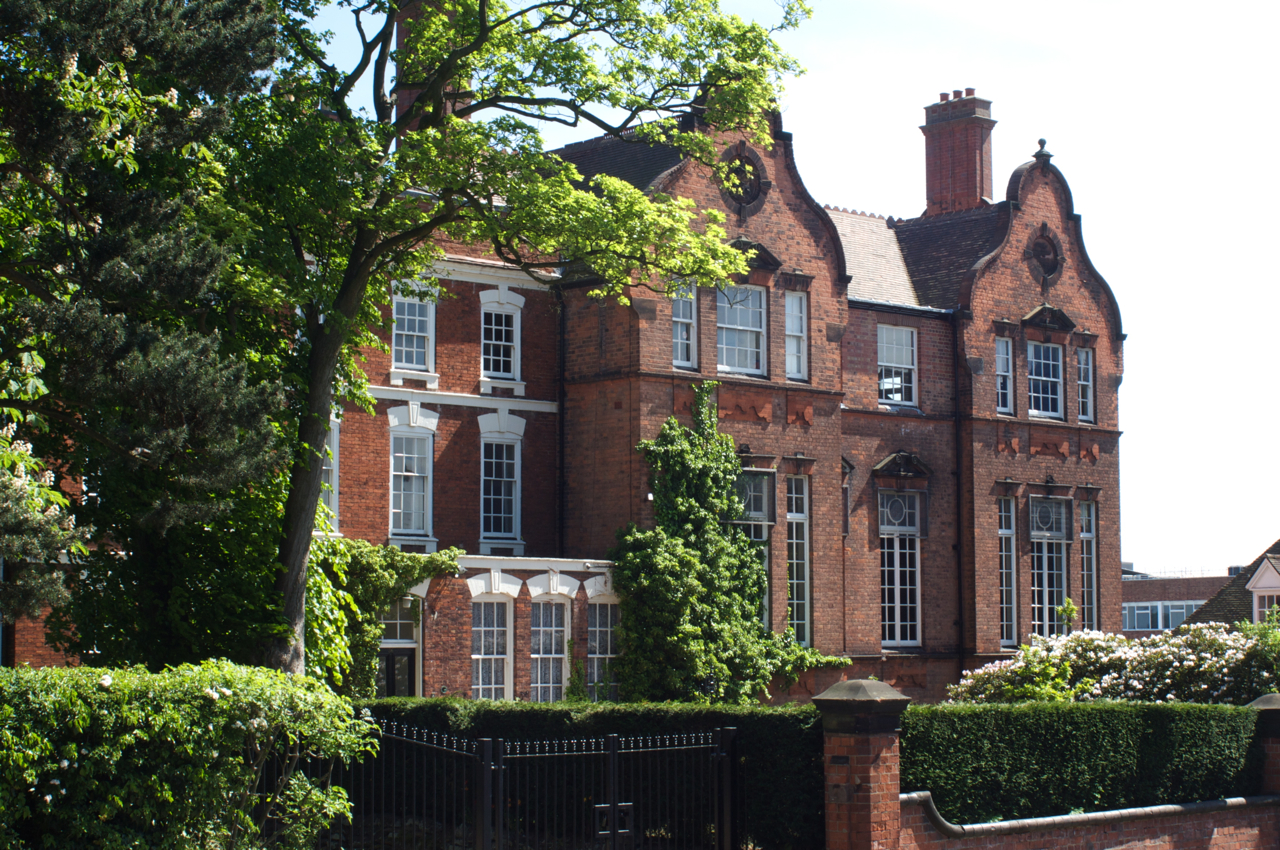
Bishop Vesey's Grammar School is a selective grammar school with academy status in Sutton Coldfield. Founded in 1527, it is one of the oldest schools in Britain.

Along with the HNC and HND, students who are interested in other vocational qualifications may pursue a foundation degree, which is a qualification that trains students to be highly skilled technicians. The National Apprenticeship Service also offers vocational education where people at ages of 16 and older enter apprenticeships in order to learn a skilled trade. There are over 60 different certifications can be obtained through an apprenticeship, which typically lasts from to 3 years. Trades apprentices receive paid wages during training and spend one day at school and the rest in the workplace to hone their skills.

Grammar schools may be run by the local authority, a foundation body or an academy trust. They select their pupils based on academic ability. The original purpose of medieval grammar schools was the teaching of Latin. Over time the curriculum was broadened, first to include Ancient Greek, and later English and other European languages, natural sciences, mathematics, history, geography, art and other subjects. In some localities children can enter a grammar school if they pass the eleven plus exam; there are also a number of isolated fully selective grammar schools and a few dozen partially selective schools. The oldest state school in England is Beverley Grammar School, which was founded in 700 AD.

==== France ====
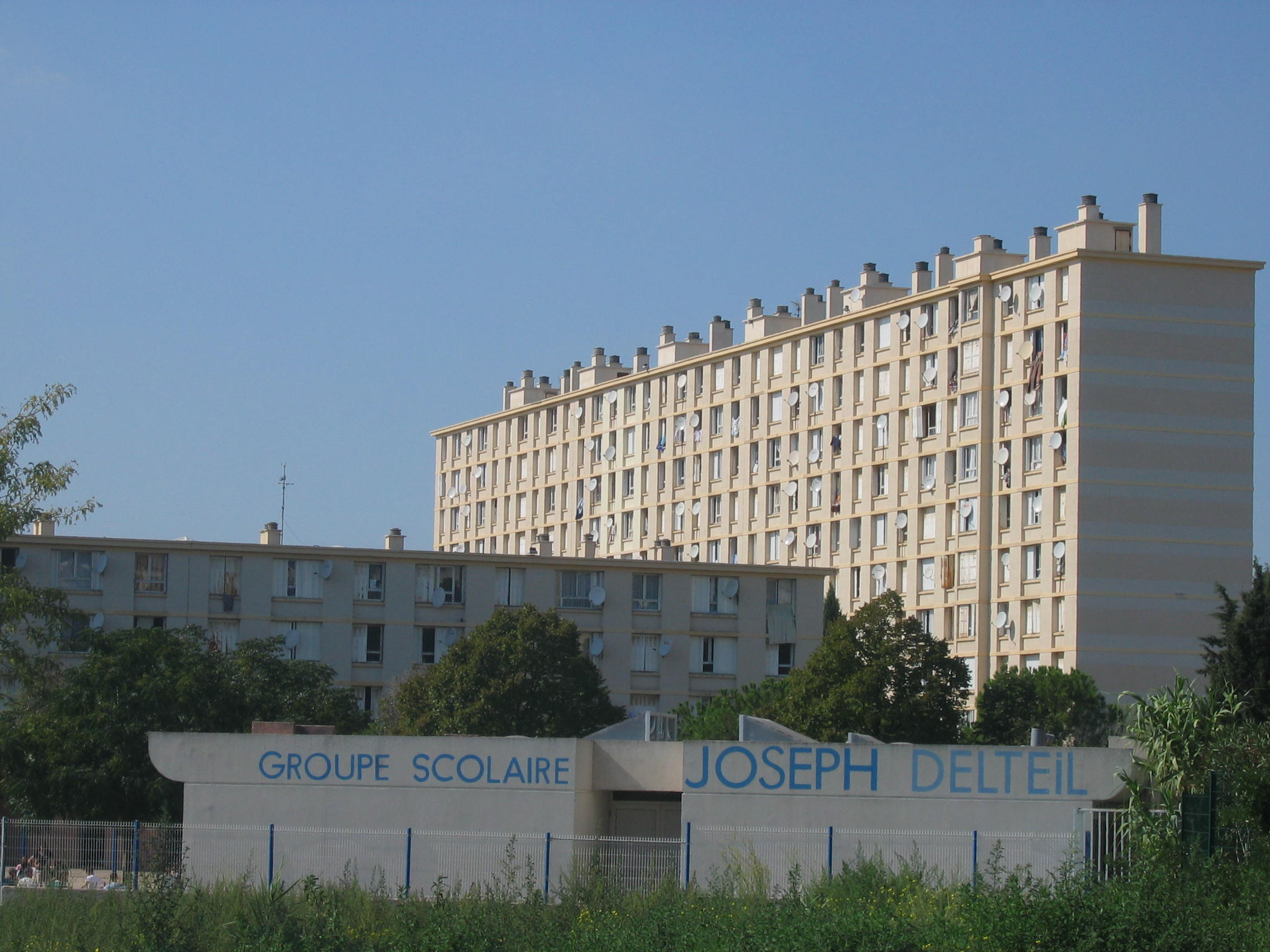
Ecole Elementaire Joseph Delteil in Montpellier, France

The French educational system is highly centralised, organised, and ramified. It is divided into three stages:

- primary education (enseignement primaire)
- secondary education (enseignement secondaire)
- tertiary or college education (enseignement supérieur)

Schooling in France is mandatory as of age three. Primary education takes place in kindergarten (école maternelle) for children from 3 to 6 and (école élémentaire) from 6 to 11. For public schools, both schools building and administrative staff are managed by the borough's (commune) while professors are (Education nationale) civil servants. Some children even start earlier at age two in pré-maternelle or garderie class, which is essentially a daycare facility.

French secondary education is divided into two schools:

- the collège for the first four years directly following primary school
- the lycée for the next three years

The completion of secondary studies leads to the baccalauréat. The baccalauréat (also known as bac) is the end-of-lycée diploma students sit for in order to enter university, a Classe préparatoire aux grandes écoles, or professional life. The term baccalauréat refers to the diploma and the examinations themselves. It is comparable to British A-Levels, American SATs, the Irish Leaving Certificate and German Abitur.

Most students sit for the baccalauréat général which is divided into three streams of study, called séries. The série scientifique (S) is concerned with mathematics and natural sciences, the série économique et sociale (ES) with economics and social sciences, and the série littéraire (L) focuses on French and foreign languages and philosophy.

The Grandes écoles of France are higher education establishments outside the mainstream framework of the public universities. They are generally focused on a single subject area, such as engineering, have a moderate size, and are often quite (sometimes extremely) selective in their admission of students. They are widely regarded as prestigious, and traditionally have produced most of France's scientists and executives.

==== Germany ====
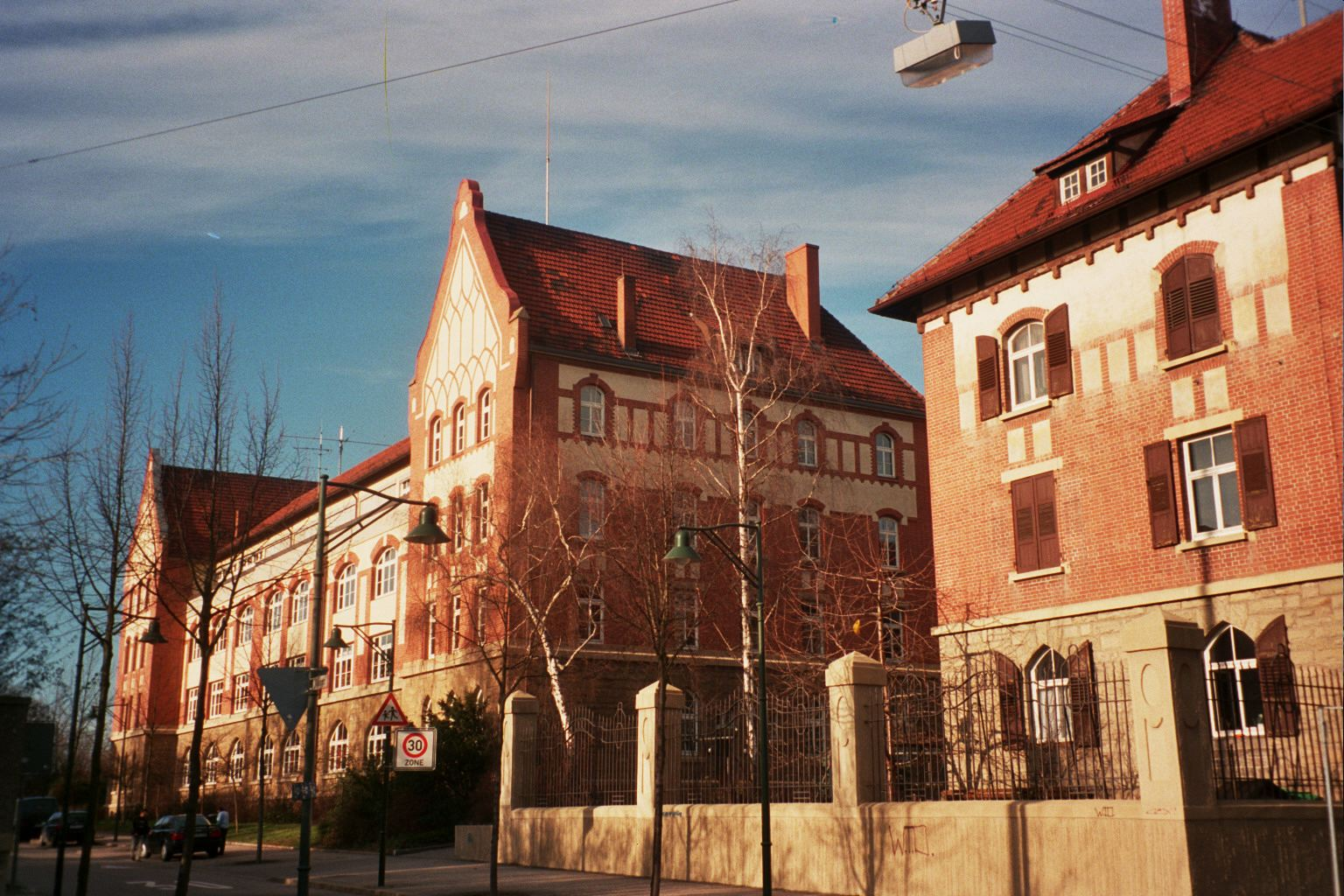
Osterholzschule, a state school in Ludwigsburg, Germany

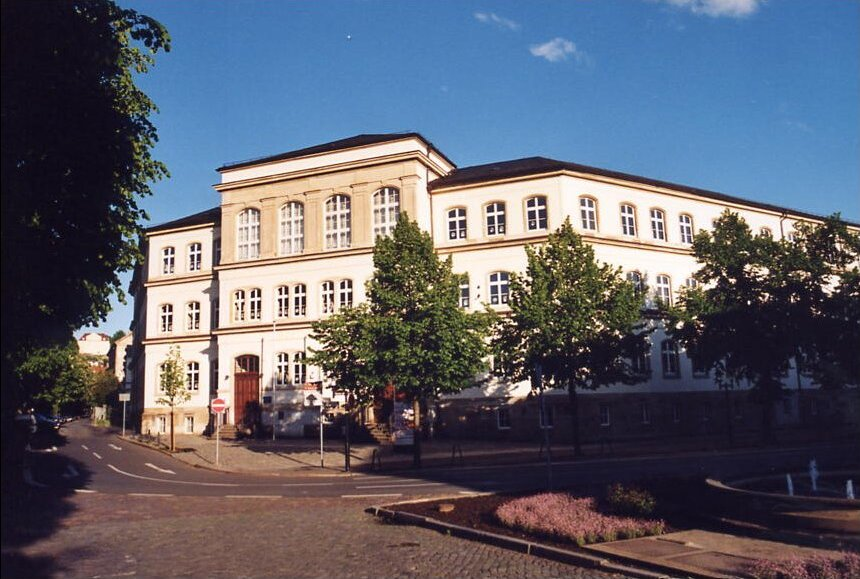
A German school named after Johann Wolfgang von Goethe in Pirna, Germany

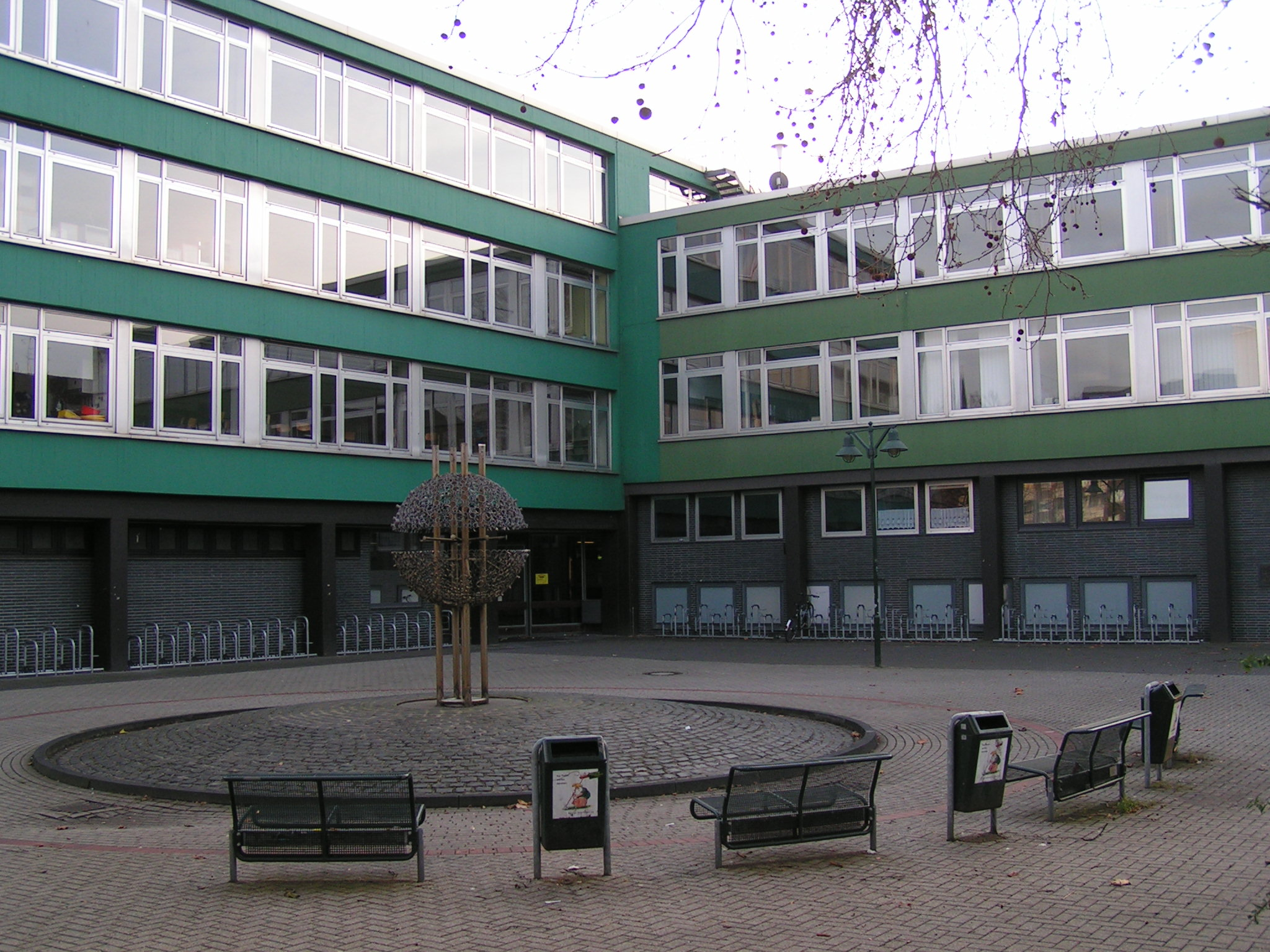
Landrat-Lucas in Leverkusen, one of the more modern German state schools

Education in Germany is provided to a large extent by the government, with control coming from state level, (Länder) and funding coming from two levels: federal and state. Curricula, funding, teaching, and other policies are set through the respective state's ministry of education. Decisions about the acknowledgment of private schools (the German equivalent to accreditation in the US) are also made by these ministries. However, public schools are automatically recognised, since these schools are supervised directly by the ministry of education bureaucracy.

Although the first kindergarten in the world was opened in 1840 by Friedrich Wilhelm August Fröbel in the German town of Bad Blankenburg, and the term kindergarten is even a loanword from the German language, they are not part of the German school system. Article 7 Paragraph 6 of the German constitution (the Grundgesetz) abolished pre-school as part of the German school system. However, virtually all German kindergartens are public. They are either directly run by municipal governments, or contracted out, most often, to the two largest Christian churches in Germany. These municipal kindergartens are financed by taxes and progressive income-based customer fees, but are not considered part of the public school system.

A German public school does not charge tuition fees. The first stage of the German public school system is the Grundschule (primary school – 1st to 4th grade or, in Berlin and Brandenburg, 1st to 6th grade) After Grundschule (at 10 or 12 years of age), there are four secondary schooling options:

- Hauptschule (the least academic, much like a modernised Volksschule) until 9th or, in Berlin and North Rhine-Westphalia, until 10th grade. The students attending those types of school may be awarded the Hauptschulabschluss (school-leaving certificate) or in some cases also the Mittlere Reife
- Realschule (formerly Mittelschule) until 10th grade, usually awards the Mittlere Reife
- Gymnasium (high school) until 12th grade or 13th grade, with Abitur as exit exam, qualifying for admission to university.
- Gesamtschule (comprehensive school) with all the options of the three "tracks" above.

A Gesamtschule largely corresponds to an American high school. However, it offers the same school leaving certificates as the other three types of German secondary schools: the Hauptschulabschluss school leaving certificate of a Hauptschule after 9th grade or in Berlin and North Rhine-Westphalia after 10th grade, the Realschulabschluss, also called Mittlere Reife (school-leaving certificate of a Realschule after 10th grade, and Abitur, also called Hochschulreife, after 13th or seldom after 12th grade. Students who graduate from Hauptschule or Realschule continue their schooling at a vocational school until they have full job qualifications.

This type of German school, the Berufsschule, is generally an upper-secondary public vocational school, controlled by the German federal government. It is part of Germany's dual education system. Students who graduate from a vocational school and students who graduate with good GPA from a Realschule can continue their schooling at another type of German public secondary school, the Fachoberschule, a vocational high school. The school leaving exam of this type of school, the Fachhochschulreife, enables the graduate to start studying at a Fachhochschule (polytechnic), and in Hesse also at a university within the state. The Abitur from a Gesamtschule or Gymnasium enables the graduate to start studying at a polytechnic or at a university in all states of Germany.

A number of schools for mature students exists. Schools such as the Abendrealschule serve students that are headed for the Mittlere Reife. Schools such as the Aufbaugymnasium or the Abendgymnasium prepare students for college and finish with the Abitur. These schools are usually free of charge. In Germany, most institutions of higher education are subsidised by German states and are therefore also referred to as staatliche Hochschulen (public universities) In most German states, admission to public universities is still cheap, about two hundred Euro per semester. In 2005, many states introduced additional fees of 500 Euro per semester to achieve a better teaching-quality. Additional fees for guest or graduate students are charged by many universities.

==== Ireland ====
In the Republic of Ireland, post-primary education comprises secondary, community and comprehensive schools, as well as community colleges (formerly vocational schools). Most secondary schools are publicly funded, and regulated by the state, but privately owned and managed. Community colleges are state-established and administered by Education and Training Boards (ETBs), while community and comprehensive schools are managed by Boards of Management of differing compositions.

Privately owned and managed secondary schools receive a direct grant from the state, and are subdivided into fee-paying and non fee-paying schools. The vast majority of these schools are operated by religious organisations, primarily the Catholic Church and the Church of Ireland. The charging of fees is a decision of the individual school. The Irish constitution requires the state to "endeavour to supplement and give reasonable aid to private and corporate educational initiative, and, when the public good requires it, provide other educational facilities or institutions with due regard, however, for the rights of parents, especially in the matter of religious and moral formation." In practice, most people are educated by Catholic institutions as there are few alternatives in much of the country. Non fee-paying secondary schools are usually considered to be public or state schools, while private school and fee-paying schools are considered synonymous. This is colloquial and not technically accurate.

All schools which are provided for by the state, including privately run and fee-paying secondary schools, teach the national curriculum. All students are expected to take the standardised Junior Certificate examination after three years. An optional non-academic Transition Year is provided by most but not all secondary schools immediately following the Junior Certificate. Students subsequently take one of three leaving-certificate programmes: the traditional Leaving Certificate, the Leaving Certificate Vocational Programme (LCVP) or the Leaving Certificate Applied (LCA). The vast majority of secondary school students take the traditional Leaving Certificate. Both the traditional Leaving Certificate and the Leaving Certificate Vocational Programme can lead to third-level education, with LCVP more focused on practical skills.

==== Italy ====
In Italy, a state school system or education system has existed since 1859, two years before Italian unification). Italy has a long history of universities: founded in 1088, the University of Bologna is the oldest university in the world and 5 out of 10 of the oldest universities are currently based in Italy.

The Italian school system is divided into three grades:

- Primary education (non-compulsory nursery school and elementary school)
- Secondary education (first grade (11–14) and second grade (14–19))
- Higher education (university (19+))

In Italy, there are three different types of schools and upper education:

- Pubbliche – public/state-owned school: completely free of charge for the entire compulsory school (until the age of 16). After that, for the last two years of high school, students have to pay a tax of €15.13/year. Public university is free of charge for lower income students and increases based on income. Each university chooses the maximum amount of tuition based on the student's income.
- Paritarie – privately owned school that has signed an agreement with the MIUR and that are included in the (Italian) National Education System. The government provides a specific grant for each student. Students usually have to pay a high fee for each year at the school. Paritarie schools are considered part of the educational system and students of those schools receive the same type of diploma and can access the same support (local school government) as the state-owned schools.
- Non Paritarie – privately owned school not included in the National Education System. They do not receive government funds and students have to pass the final exams in a public or paritarie school in order to get a diploma.

Differently from other countries, in the Italian educational system, public schools statistically give students a better preparation compared to paritarie and private schools.

==== The Netherlands ====
Public, special (religious), and general-special (neutral) schools are government-financed, receiving equal financial support from the government if certain criteria are met. Although they are officially free of charge, these schools may ask for a parental contribution. Private schools rely on their own funds, but they are highly uncommon in the Netherlands.

==== Romania ====
All schools up to high school are publicly funded in Romania and regulated by the Ministry of Education. Higher education like universities may be state sponsored under certain conditions (family income and school performance). Although there are private schools in Romania, they are not a popular choice since the quality of education is on par with the public schools.

==== Russia ====
Education in Russia is provided predominantly by the state and is regulated by the Ministry of Education and Science. Regional authorities regulate education within their jurisdictions within the prevailing framework of federal laws. Russia's expenditure on education has grown from 2.7% of the GDP in 2005 to 3.8% in 2013, but remains below the OECD average of 5.2%.

==== Scotland ====
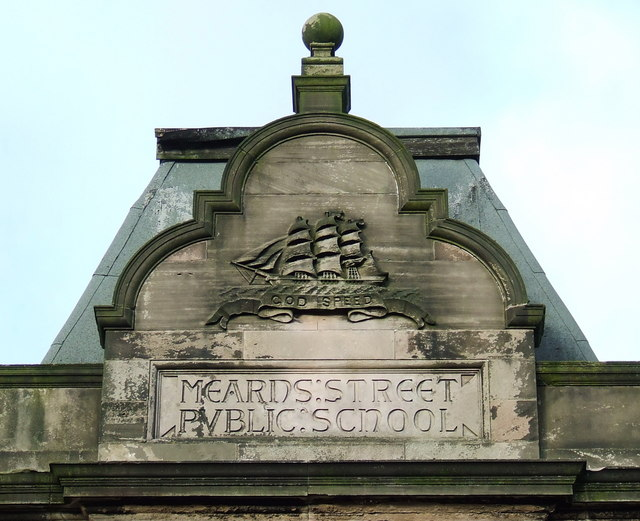
Pediment above entrance showing name of Mearns Street Public School in Greenock, Scotland, listed in 1881 for science instruction

In Scotland, a public school is "a state-controlled school run by the local burgh or county education authority, generally non-fee-paying and supported by contributions from local and national taxation".

The Church of Scotland was established in 1560, during the Protestant Reformation period, as the official state religion in Scotland. In the following year, it set out to provide a school in every parish controlled by the local kirk-session, with education to be provided free to the poor, and the expectation that church pressure would ensure that all children took part. In the year of 1633 the Parliament of Scotland introduced local taxation to fund this provision. Schooling was not free, but the tax support kept fees low, and the church and charity funded poorer students. This had considerable success, but by the late 18th century the physical extent of some parishes and population growth in others led to an increasing role for "adventure schools" funded from fees and for schools funded by religious charities, initially Protestant and later Roman Catholic.

From the early 18th century, reference was made to "the publick school of the paroch". State-administered universal education was introduced earlier in Scotland than in the rest of the United Kingdom, and the designation was incorporated into the name of many of these older publicly run institutions. In 1872, education for all children aged 5 to 13 was made compulsory with "public schools" (in the Scots meaning of schools for the general public) under local school boards.

An 1872 Act of Parliament declared that schools "under the management of the school board of a parish", and those "under the management of the school board of a burgh", were public schools within the meaning of the Act. The leaving age was raised to 14 in 1883, and the Leaving Certificate Examination was introduced in 1888 to set national standards for secondary education. School fees were ended in 1890. The Scottish Education Department ran the system centrally, with local authorities running the schools with considerable autonomy. In 1999, following devolution from the Parliament of the United Kingdom to the new Scottish Parliament, central organisation of education was taken over by departments of the Scottish Executive, with running the schools coming under unitary authority districts.

Children in Scottish state schools (or public schools) typically start primary school, or attend a junior school, aged between four and a half and five and a half depending on when the child's birthday falls. Children born between March and August would start school at the age of five years and those born between September and February start school at age four-and-a-half. Pupils remain at primary school for seven years completing Primary One to Seven.

Then aged eleven or twelve, pupils start secondary school for a compulsory period of four years, with a final two years thereafter being optional. Pupils take National 4 & 5 examinations at the age of fifteen/sixteen, sometimes earlier, most often for up to eight subjects. These include compulsory exams in English, mathematics, a foreign language, a science subject and a social subject. It is now a requirement of the Scottish Government that all pupils have two hours of physical education a week. Each school may arrange these compulsory requirements in different combinations. The minimum school leaving age is generally sixteen, after completion of Standard Grade examinations. Pupils who continue their school education after the age of sixteen, may choose to study for Access, Intermediate or Higher Grade and Advanced Higher exams. The Curriculum for Excellence was introduced to secondary schools in session 2012/2013. The assessment of pupils' attainment will change, with 'National' qualifications replacing most Standard Grade and Intermediate Grade qualifications.

==== Spain ====
Primary Education (EP) and Compulsory Secondary Education (ESO) make up Spain's Basic Education. These two stages of education are compulsory and free of charge for everyone. Generally they comprise ten years of schooling, normally between the ages of 5 and 16. Once the compulsory stages have been passed, it is possible to opt for the Bachillerato (similar to the Baccalaureate or A-levels), aimed at gaining access to university-level education. Alternatively, it is possible to opt for Professional Training or Higher-level Training Cycles (FP).

Education in Spain is currently regulated by the Ley Orgánica de Educación (LOE) of 2006, as amended by the Ley Orgánica por la que se modifica la LOE de 2006 (LOMLOE) of 2020. Education is a universal right and a duty in Spain. Therefore, it is compulsory, free and guaranteed for 100% of the population up to the age of 16. From that stage, there are a number of options available, some of them partially government-funded.

==== Sweden ====
In Sweden, state schools are funded by tax money. This goes for both primary schools (Swedish: grundskola), and secondary school (Swedish: gymnasium) and universities. When studying at a university, however, students might have to pay for accommodation and literature. There are private schools as well which also receive funding from the government, but may not charge tuition fees.

Compulsory education starts at six years of age, starting in förskola (pre-school). The Swedish primary school is split into three parts; lågstadiet – 'the low stage', which covers grades 1 to 3. Students learn the basics of the three core subjects, called kärnämnen in Swedish: Swedish, English and mathematics. It also includes some natural science. Mellanstadiet, 'the middle stage', which covers grades 4 to 6, introduces the children to more detailed subjects. Woodwork and needlework, social and domestic science, and even a second, foreign language in grade 6, a B-språk (B-language). The languages available are usually French, Spanish or German depending on the school. Högstadiet, 'the high stage', is the last stage of compulsory education, between grades 7 and 9. This is when studies get more in-depth and are taken to an international level.

Swedish children take national exams at grades 3, 6 and 9. Children at grade 3 take these exams in two of the three main subjects: Swedish and mathematics. In grade 6 the exams extend to the third main subject, English, and in grade 9 the exams also extend to one of the subjects in natural sciences, and one of the four subjects in samhällsorientering (geography, history, religious studies, and civics). They first receive grades in grade 6. The grading system is letter-based, ranging from A–F, where F is the lowest grade and A is the highest. F means "not approved", while all other ratings above F mean "approved". There are only objectives for E, C and A; D means the person has met most but not all objectives for C, while B means the person has met most objectives for A. When applying to gymnasium (senior high schools) or universities, a meritvärde ('meritous point value') is calculated. E is worth 10 points, D 12.5 points, C 15 points, and so on. Children that are not approved in Swedish, English or mathematics will have to study at a special high school program called the introductory program. Once they are approved, they may apply to an ordinary high school program. Swedes study at high school for three years, between the ages of 16 and 18.

=== Oceania ===
==== Australia ====
Government schools in Australia, also known as public or state schools, are free to attend for Australian citizens and permanent residents, whereas private schools charge attendance fees. They can be divided into two categories: open and selective schools. The open schools accept all students from their government-defined catchment areas, whereas selective schools admit students based on some specific criteria, e.g. academic merit. As of 2022, Australia has one of the most privatised education systems in the world with more than 30 per cent of primary students and over 40 per cent of secondary students attending private schools, while the OECD average is around 18 per cent

Regardless of whether a school is part of the government or private systems, they are required to adhere to the same curriculum frameworks of their state or territory. The curriculum framework however provides for some flexibility in the syllabus, so that subjects such as religious education can be taught. Most school students wear uniforms. The name for a government-funded primary school varies by state and territory. In New South Wales, the name "public school" is used. In Queensland, the name "state school" is used. In every other state and territory, the name "primary school" is used.

==== New Zealand ====
Both state and state-integrated schools are government-funded. The latter are former private schools which are now "integrated" into the state system under the Private Schools Conditional Integration Act 1975 "on a basis which will preserve and safeguard the special character of the education provided by them". According to an OECD report, about 86% of all school-aged children attend state schools and 10% attend state integrated schools.

The government provides education as a right—it is freely available up to the end of the calendar year following a student's 19th birthday. Primary and secondary education is compulsory for students between the ages of 6 and 16, although in practice most children enrol at school on their 5th birthday. Most students start at age 5 and remain in school for the full 13 years. While there is overlap in some schools, primary education ends at Year 8 and secondary education at Year 13. In some areas Years 7 and 8 are considered part of intermediate school—a separate school which acts as a bridge between primary and secondary education—leaving primary school to end at Year 6.

== See also ==
- Compulsory education § By country
- Education Index
- Free education
- Public university
