= Trinity Academy, Brixton =

Trinity Academy

Location
- 56 Brixton Hill; London, SW2 1QS; England; 51.4565°N 0.1192°W

Information
- Type: Free School
- Religious affiliation: Roman Catholic Ethos
- Established: 2014
- Local authority: Lambeth
- Department for Education URN: 140966 Tables
- Ofsted: Reports
- Principal: Antony Faccinello
- Gender: Coeducational
- Age: 11 to 18
- Website: www.trinityacademylondon.org

Trinity Academy is a coeducational Free School, established in 2014. It is located in the Brixton area of the London Borough of Lambeth, England, and caters for pupils aged 11 to 18. The school was judged to be Good by Ofsted in its first inspection in May 2017.

Although Trinity Academy is not formally designated as a faith school, it has a Roman Catholic ethos. One of the school's founders, former BBC broadcaster Dennis Sewell, has criticized the Catholic Education Service, for refusing to open any formally designated Catholic free schools due to the 50% rule which limits the number of places that can be reserved for Catholics.

Since 2017, the school has been housed in a building next to South Bank University Sixth Form.
