= Faith school =

Religious educational institution in the UK

A faith school is a school in the United Kingdom that teaches a general curriculum but which has a particular religious character or formal links with a religious or faith-based organisation. The term is most commonly applied to state-funded faith schools, although many independent schools also have religious characteristics.

There are various types of state-funded faith school, including Voluntary Aided (VA) schools, Voluntary Controlled (VC) schools, and Faith Academies.

Schools with a formal faith designation may give priority to applicants who are of the faith, and specific exemptions from Section 85 of the Equality Act 2010 enable them to do that. However, state-funded faith schools must admit other applicants if they cannot fill all of their places and must ensure that their admission arrangements comply with the School Admissions Code.

Note that legislation varies between the countries of the United Kingdom since education is a devolved matter.

== England ==
The Education Act 1944 introduced the formal requirement for daily prayers in all state-funded schools, even if many state schools, particularly secondary schools, no longer do so. Later acts changed this requirement to a daily "collective act of worship", the School Standards and Framework Act 1998 being the most recent. This also requires such acts of worship to be "wholly or mainly of a broadly Christian character". The term "mainly" means that acts related to other faiths can be carried out providing the majority are Christian.

Independent schools are exempt from this provision, so it has always been possible to have an independent (not state-funded) school with no act of worship or with acts of worship relating to non-Christian religions. However, many schools that were originally church schools are now largely state funded, as are some Jewish schools. These are allowed to have acts of worship "in accordance with the beliefs of the religion or denomination specified for the school". Until 1997, the UK funded only Christian or Jewish faith schools (Muslim schools existed but were privately funded), but the 1997–2007 Labour Government expanded this to other religions, and began using the term "faith school".

Education in England includes various types of state-funded faith school, including Voluntary Aided (VA) schools, Voluntary Controlled (VC) schools, and Faith Academies.

The two main providers of faith schools in England are the Church of England and the Catholic Education Service.

In 2011, about one third of the 20,000 state funded schools in England were faith schools, approximately 7,000 in total, of which 68% were Church of England schools and 30% were Roman Catholic. There were 42 Jewish, 12 Muslim, 3 Sikh and 1 Hindu faith schools.

Following the 2010 Academy Act, many faith schools converted to Academy status, and are sometimes known as Faith Academies. Many Free Schools have also been created with a religious designation, and these are also sometimes referred to as Faith Academies. All academies can set pay and conditions for staff, and are not obliged to follow the National Curriculum. However the Department for Education "will not approve any application where we have any concerns about creationism being taught as a valid scientific theory, or about schools failing to teach evolution adequately as part of their science curricula."

Voluntary Aided and Voluntary Controlled faith schools follow the same National Curriculum as state schools, with the exception of religious studies, where they are free to limit it to their own beliefs.

== Wales ==
The Welsh Government provides statutory support to education that recognises a religious dimension, including funding. All publicly supported schools are Christian in character. They can give priority to teachers of the faith and to pupils of the faith where oversubscribed. The Anglican Church in Wales runs 172 primary and secondary schools in Wales. The Catholic Education Service runs 89 schools in Wales. The school buildings and land are owned by the Church, but running costs and 90% of the maintenance are covered by the state. 51% of teachers are Catholic and is required that the Head Teacher, Deputy Head, and Head of Religious Studies are Catholic. St Joseph's Catholic and Anglican High School is the only faith school in Wales for both churches. Cardiff Muslim Primary School, and Ihsan Academy are independent Muslim schools (taking boys and girls) in Cardiff.

== Scotland ==
Although schools existed in Scotland prior to the Reformation, widespread public education in Scotland was pioneered by the Church of Scotland, which handed over its parish schools to the state in 1872. Charitably funded Roman Catholic schools were brought into the state system by the Education (Scotland) Act 1918. This introduced state funding of Catholic schools, which kept their distinct religious education, but access to schools by Catholic clergy and requirement that school staff be acceptable to the Church were retained. The Catholic schools remain as "faith schools." Other schools in Scotland are known as "non-denominational" schools, however, the Church of Scotland continues to have some links to this form of education. The subject of religious education continues to be taught in these non-denominational institutions, as is required by Scots Law.

In Scottish Catholic schools, employment of non-Catholics can be restricted by the Church; often, one of the requirements for Catholic applicants is to possess a certificate that has been signed by their parish priest, although each diocese has its own variation on the method of approval. Non-Catholic applicants are not required to provide any religious documentation. Certain positions, such as headteachers, deputy heads, religious education teachers and guidance teachers are required to be Roman Catholic. Scottish faith schools have the practice of school-wide daily assembly/worship; some Catholic schools even have their own prayer. Whilst maintaining a strong Catholic ethos, Scottish Catholic schools have long welcomed pupils from other faith backgrounds, though they tend to give precedence to non-Catholics who come from religious families and a large number of Muslims also go to Catholic schools.

The Imam Muhammad Zakariya School, Dundee was the only Muslim school in the UK outside England, and was an independent school, until its closure in 2006.

== Northern Ireland ==
In the early part of the 20th century, the majority of schools were owned and run by either the Catholic or Protestant churches.

The Protestant schools were gradually transferred to state ownership under Education and Library Boards (ELBs) responsible to the Department of Education, but with an Act of Parliament to ensure that the ethos of the schools conformed to this variety of Christianity, and giving the churches certain rights with respect to governance.

The Catholic schools are not owned by the state but by trustees, who are senior figures in the Church. However, all running costs are paid by the ELBs and all capital costs by the Department of Education. The employment of teachers is controlled by the Council for Catholic Maintained Schools, who are the largest employer of teachers (8,500) in Northern Ireland. The 547 Catholic schools teach 46% of the children of Northern Ireland. Teachers are not required to be of the Catholic faith, but all those in Catholic primary schools must hold a Certificate in Religious Education.

While the Protestant and Catholic schools were theoretically open to all, they were almost entirely of their own religious sectors, so starting in the 1980s, a number of so-called integrated schools were established.

As of 2010, the great majority of schools in Northern Ireland are either Catholic or Protestant, with relatively few integrated, a situation called "benign apartheid" by Peter Robinson, the First Minister of Northern Ireland.

== Issues about faith schools in the UK ==
English schools with fewer free school meal children than local postcode average (2010)
School type	Primary	Secondary
Church of England	63.5%	39.6%
Roman Catholic	76.3%	64.7%
Non-religious	47.3%	28.8%

Pupils claiming free school meals in England (2010)
School type	Primary	Secondary
All	19.3%	15.2%
Church of England	13.1%	12.0%
Roman Catholic	16.3%	14.0%
Non-religious	21.5%	15.6%

An analysis of 2010 English school data by The Guardian found that state faith schools were not taking a fair share of the poorest pupils in their local areas, as indicated by free school meal entitlement. Not only was this so at the overall national level, but also in the postcode areas nearby the schools. This suggested selection by religion in England was leading to selection of children from more well-off families.

In 2002, Frank Dobson, to increase inclusivity and lessen social division, proposed an amendment to the Education Bill (for England and Wales) to limit the selection rights of faith schools by requiring them to offer at least a quarter of places to children whose parents belong to another or no religion. The proposal was defeated in Parliament.

However, in October 2006, Bishop Kenneth Stevenson, speaking on behalf of the Church of England, said, "I want to make a specific commitment that all new Church of England schools should have at least 25% of places available to children with no requirement that they be from practising Christian families." This commitment applies only to new schools, not existing ones.

In 2005, David Bell, the head of the Office for Standards in Education said "Faith should not be blind. I worry that many young people are being educated in faith-based schools, with little appreciation of their wider responsibilities and obligations to British society. This growth in faith schools needs to be carefully but sensitively monitored by government to ensure that pupils receive an understanding of not only their own faith but of other faiths and the wider tenets of British society". He criticised Islamic schools in particular, calling them a "threat to national identity".

Although not state schools, there are around 700 unregulated madrassas in Britain, attended by approximately 100,000 children of Muslim parents. Doctor Ghayasuddin Siddiqui, the leader of the Muslim Parliament of Great Britain, has called for them to be subject to government inspection following publication of a 2006 report that highlighted widespread physical and sexual abuse.

In September 2007, attempts to create the first secular school in Britain were blocked. Dr Paul Kelley, head of Monkseaton High School in Tyneside, proposed plans to eliminate the daily act of Christian worship and cause "a fundamental change in the relationship with the school and the established religion of the country".

In November 2007, the Krishna-Avanti Hindu school in north-west London became the first school in the United Kingdom to make vegetarianism a condition of entry. Additionally, parents of pupils are expected to abstain from alcohol to prove they are followers of the faith.

In November 2007, the Jewish Free School in north London was found to be discriminating for giving preference to children with distant Jewish relations in its under-subscription criteria. Giving preference to children born to Jewish mothers is permitted as it is a religious rather than a race issue.

In January 2008, the Commons Children, Schools and Families Select Committee raised concerns about the government's plans for expanding faith schooling. The general secretary of the Association of Teachers and Lecturers, Dr. Mary Bousted, said "Unless there are crucial changes in the way many faith schools run we fear divisions in society will be exacerbated. In our increasingly multi-faith and secular society it is hard to see why our taxes should be used to fund schools which discriminate against the majority of children and potential staff because they are not of the same faith".

Long standing opponents of faith schools include Humanists UK and National Secular Society. In 2008, the campaign group the Accord Coalition was founded to ensure state funded schools teach about the broad range of beliefs in society; do not discriminate on religious grounds and are made suitable for all children, regardless of their or their parents’ religious or non-religious beliefs. The campaign, which seeks to reform the faith school sector, brings together a range of groups and individuals, including educationalists, civil rights activists and both the religious and non-religious.

In June 2013, the Fair Admissions Campaign was officially launched, the campaign aims to abolish the selection of pupils based on their faith or that of their parents at state funded schools in England and Wales. The campaign has support from both religious and non-religious organizations at both the national and local level including the Accord Coalition, the Association of Teachers and Lecturers, the British Humanist Association, British Muslims for Secular Democracy, ICoCo Foundation, the Centre for Studies on Inclusive Education, Ekklesia, the Hindu Academy, the Liberal Democrat Education Association, Richmond Inclusive Schools Campaign, the Runnymede Trust, the Socialist Educational Association, the General Assembly of Unitarian and Free Christian Churches.

In October 2013, the Theos Think Tank published a research study on faith schools, titled More than an Educated Guess: Assessing the evidence, which concluded that there is evidence for the "faith schools effect boosting academic performance but concludes that this may reflect admissions policies rather than the ethos of the school." John Pritchard, Chair of the Church of England's Education Board, welcomed the results of the study, stating that "I am pleased to see that this report recognises two very important facts. The first is that faith schools contribute successfully to community cohesion; they are culturally diverse and there is no evidence that there is any social division on racial or ethnic grounds. The second important fact acknowledged in the Theos report is that faith schools do not intentionally filter or skew admissions in a way which is designed to manipulate the system." The study also stated that much "of the debate [about faith schools] is by nature ideological, revolving around the relative rights and responsibilities of parents, schools and government in a liberal and plural society." The Bishop of Oxford concurred, stating that "children are being denied the chance to go to some of Britain’s best schools because antireligious campaigners have turned attempts to expand faith schools into an ideological battle-ground". Responding to the report, BHA, now Humanists UK Chief Executive Andrew Copson commented, "Although the report masquerades as a new, impartial, survey of evidence surrounding "faith” schools, it is in fact more like apologetics for such schools. The report omits evidence, misrepresents evidence and even makes basic errors about types of school and types of data that undermine its claim to be taken seriously. We have produced a detailed analysis of its many flaws, which runs to pages."

In June 2014, the Observer newspaper reported the results of a survey indicating that 58% of voters believe faith schools should not be funded by the state or should be abolished. In 2015 the Commission on Religion and Belief in British Public Life concluded that faith schools are "socially divisive" and should be phased out. Since the start of 2016, as an indirect consequence and to cut costs, councils of many local governments in England and Wales ended or proposed to end free transport to many of those schools, much to the displeasure of affected families, while some other councils gradually did even before the survey was conducted. Similar effects, politically, are also felt in Scotland. Socially, in fact, the Humanist Society Scotland sued the Scottish Government and was granted a judicial review challenging the government ministers over their decision not to allow pupils to decide for themselves whether they take part in religious activities occurring in schools. A substantive hearing is expected to be in early 2017.

In 2017, the Conservative Prime Minister Theresa May pledged to remove the 50% Rule (introduced in 2010) which limits the proportion of places that free schools with a faith designation can allocate with reference to faith. This led to much campaigning on both sides of the debate. In the end the government scrapped the plan to remove the 50% Rule.

== Opposition and support ==
=== Opposition ===
Humanists UK opposes faith schools and says "We aim for a secular state guaranteeing human rights, with no privilege or discrimination on grounds of religion or belief, and so we campaign against faith schools, and for an inclusive, secular schools system, where children and young people of all different backgrounds and beliefs can learn with and from each other."

National Secular Society "campaign for an inclusive and secular education system" and say "Our secular approach to education would see faith schools phased out". NSS run a campaign called No More Faith Schools, which "is a national campaign dedicated to bringing about an end to state funded faith schools." They argue that "Faith schools have a negative impact on social cohesion, foster segregation of children on social, ethnic and religious lines, and undermine choice and equality. They also enable religious groups to use public money to evangelise to children."

The Richard Dawkins Foundation for Reason & Science, as well as its parent organisation, the Centre For Inquiry, also oppose faith schools, and Richard Dawkins (who's on the board of directors) objects to faith-based education as he regards it as "indoctrinating tiny children in the religion of their parents, and to slap religious labels on them."

=== Support ===
The Catholic Education Service (CES) is in support of faith schools, and is an agency of the Catholic Bishops’ Conference of England and Wales (CBCEW), whose object is the advancement of the Catholic religion, primarily through education.

The Church of England (CofE) is also in support of faith schools, they say "Our vision for education is deeply Christian" and their values "faith-based".

In the UK 98% of faith schools (~33% of all schools) are run either by the CES or CofE.

== See also ==
- Catholic school
- Charter school
- Christian school
- Democratic education
- Denominational education
- Jewish day school
- List of free schools in England which are formally designated as faith schools
- Madrasah
- Parochial school
- Religion and children
- Separate school
- Sunday school
