= 50% Rule =

English faith school admissions policy

The 50% rule or 50% cap in English faith school admissions introduced in 2010, stipulating that where newly established academies with a religious character are oversubscribed, at least 50% of their places would be "open places", i.e. allocated without reference to faith. The rule is sometimes referred to as the faith cap on admissions. However, as the open places were just as accessible to faith applicants as non-faith applicants, in practice the rule did not explicitly prevent such schools from having more than 50% of students with a faith affiliation.

The 50% rule applied only to new academies, established under the "free school" programme, not to maintained schools that converted to academy status.

== Rationale ==
David Laws, Schools Minister at the time the 50% Rule was introduced, described the motivation behind it in a parliamentary debate. He said: "Where the Government fund new Church or faith school provision, it is right that such new schools cater for local demand in the faith, but the needs of children in the broader local community must not be overlooked. We want all local children to have the same opportunity to access high-quality state-funded education. The fact that it is state-funded is the point."

He went on to talk about the principle of parental choice, saying there are "two competing rights in a state-funded school system: people's right to choose to have their children educated in the way that they wish, and the right of [other] taxpayers who live near state-funded schools to have some ability to access them despite the over-representation of people from the faith that the system allows."

== History ==
The 50% rule was introduced by the 2010 Coalition Government formed from the Conservative Party and the Liberal Democrats. In the run up to the 2010 general election, the Liberal Democrat manifesto had stated that "We will ensure that all faith schools develop an inclusive admissions policy." This aim was reflected in the Coalition Agreement as follows: "We will ensure that all new Academies follow an inclusive admissions policy. We will work with faith groups to enable more faith schools and facilitate inclusive admissions policies in as many of these schools as possible."

The 50% rule was first applied following the Academies Act 2010, via a condition to the Funding Agreements for all new faith academies established under the Free School programme. It was later documented within the 2014 Schools Admissions Code. The Education Secretary, Michael Gove, suggested that the rule should also be "voluntarily" applied to other types of new faith school.

The Catholic Education Service lobbied for removal of the 50% Rule, saying that they would not open any Free schools while it was in place. In April 2014, the issue was aired in the House of Commons in a debate led by Damian Hinds MP.

The Coalition Government was replaced by a Conservative Government in the 2015 general election. The Schools Minister with responsibility for Free Schools, Lord Nash, told campaigners that there were no plans to review the 50% Rule. However, the following year, Nick Timothy, the newly appointed director of the New Schools Network, responsible for encouraging and supporting the establishment of Free Schools, spoke out in favour of ending it.

When Theresa May became Prime Minister in 2016, Nick Timothy became her Joint Chief of Staff, and was credited as responsible when later the same year a national consultation by the Department for Education asked for people's views on removing the 50% Rule, to enable new faith academies to select up to 100% of pupils based on their faith. The move was opposed by individuals and groups campaigning for inclusive admissions, including the Accord Coalition, Humanists UK and the National Secular Society as well as other commentators. The results of the consultation were seen as a foregone conclusion by the Catholic Education Service, which wrote in its 2016 annual report: "After a CES coordinated campaign which put pressure on Government officials, parliamentarians and Downing Street special advisers, the Prime Minister announced the removal of the 50% cap on faith-based admission for new Free Schools. This announcement means that Catholic dioceses will be able to open new Catholic schools for the first time in six years."

However, in April 2017, before the results of the consultation were published, Theresa May called a snap general election, with Nick Timothy as a senior advisor for her campaign. Their Conservative manifesto included a pledge to "replace the unfair and ineffective inclusivity rules that prevent the establishment of new Roman Catholic schools."

When the election resulted in a hung parliament, Nick Timothy resigned, and the future of many of the manifesto policies was thrown into doubt. This resulted in speculation as to whether the 50% Rule would be repealed or not, and associated lobbying and campaigning on both sides of the debate. Nevertheless, eight months after the consultation report was expected to be published, the Government said it was "still considering how best to progress the policy proposals ... in light of the responses to the consultation."

In January 2018, a Cabinet reshuffle resulted in the incumbent Education Secretary, Justine Greening, being replaced by Damian Hinds, whose record of supporting the Catholic Education Service's position on the 50% rule fuelled speculation that he planned to implement the Government's manifesto pledge to remove it. The following month, he confirmed that was his intention. However, in May 2018 it was announced that the 50% cap would remain in place. Instead the Government said it would provide financial support for local authorities that want to work with faith groups to create new voluntary aided schools.

In May 2024, Conservative Education Secretary Gillian Keegan launched a consultation into abolishing the 50% rule. However, a General Election was called a few weeks later, and the incoming Labour Government did not include any commitments about the 50% rule in their manifesto.

== Application and interpretation ==
=== Catholic Free Schools ===
The Catholic Education Service refused to support the establishment of new faith academies under the 50% Rule because they interpreted it as forcing schools "to turn pupils away because they were Catholics while admitting others because they were not". They said that this would be against Canon Law, although campaigners for inclusive admissions argued that their claim was "disingenuous and politically motivated". The chairperson of the CES has said: “The Church of England runs schools for the wider community ..... Ours are different. They are for the Catholic community.”

One Catholic Free School was established, St Michael's in Camborne, as a conversion from the private sector. It originally received "one off" approval from church officials, but this was later withdrawn and, after it failed to thrive, the school was eventually absorbed into a community academy. While it was operating as a Catholic free school it was found to misinterpret the 50% Rule, because its oversubscription criteria prioritised 50% of places for "non-Catholics" rather than allocating them "without reference to faith". This was judged to be a breach of the Admissions Code, a judgement which confirmed that places allocated "without reference to faith" should be just as accessible to Catholics (or other faith groups) as to those without a faith affiliation.

Another Free School, Trinity Academy in Brixton, opened without a formal Catholic designation (for which it would have needed the support of the church authorities), but with a Catholic ethos, and oversubscription criteria that allocated 100% of places without reference to faith. The school's founder has spoken out against the Catholic Education Service's position on the 50% rule, describing it as "stubborn" and a missed opportunity for evangelism.

When St Richard Reynolds Catholic High School and Primary School were established in the London Borough of Richmond Upon Thames in 2013, campaign groups accused the local authority of helping the Catholic church to avoid the 50% Rule, by providing financial and political support for them to be set up as voluntary aided schools rather than Free Schools, and setting a legal precedent for interpretation of Education Act 2011. The Education Secretary suggested that the school should "voluntarily" adhere to the 50% rule. In the end, the diocesan authorities did provide 10 open places in the primary school, however, like St. Michaels in Camborne, they were also required by the Schools' Adjudicator to modify the wording of their policy to ensure that Catholic children could access the open places.

=== Church of England Free Schools ===
The Church of England (CE) established large numbers of new schools under the Free School programme. The Archbishop of Canterbury, Justin Welby, has said that the Church of England is moving away from selecting pupils based on religion. Responding to the proposal to remove the 50% Rule, their Chief Education Officer stated that "Our schools are not faith schools for the faithful, they are church schools for the community." However, campaign groups have said that the admissions authorities for CE schools frequently do not follow this advice.

Some Church of England free schools go beyond what is required by the 50% Rule and have oversubscription criteria which allocate 100% of places without reference to faith, in line with many of their established voluntary controlled schools.

One school's interpretation of the 50% Rule was judged to be unreasonable, because it designated Church of England primary schools, which themselves had faith-based admissions criteria, as feeder schools for the 50% of places that were being allocated without reference to faith.

Following the Government's consultation on removal of the 50% Rule, one proposed CE Free School apparently published plans for oversubscription criteria that selected only 25% of places without reference to faith, prompting criticism that people were "jumping the gun" in assuming the change would go ahead. However, the school later said the policy description on their website had been incorrect.

=== Other Faith Free Schools ===
The Free School programme resulted in the establishment of many new schools with several faith designations, including other Christian denominations, Jewish, Hindu, Sikh and Muslim, all of which are subject to the 50% Rule.

Some senior members of the Jewish community publicly supported the removal of the 50% Rule.

== Impact ==
The Government's 2016 consultation document "Schools that Work for Everyone", which was proposing removal of the 50% Rule, said that "in open free schools designated for minority faiths in the English school system (Islam, Judaism, Sikhism and Hinduism) the intake has been predominantly of pupils from similar ethnic backgrounds". They contrasted this with Voluntary Aided Catholic schools which they said have higher levels of diversity on average, despite not being subject to the 50% Rule.

The same document said ""Other Christian" free schools have nearly a fifth of pupils of Asian origin and nearly a tenth from black ethnic families, with just 55% of White ethnic origin".

In response to the consultation, a campaign group in favour of retaining the 50% Rule published analysis indicating that schools subject to the rule are more ethnically diverse than those that aren't, concluding that "if the 50% cap was rolled out across all state-funded secondary schools then .. whilst there would be little difference for the minority faith schools, tens or even hundreds of thousands of non-white pupils would gain access to Christian schools when they haven't had access before."
