= Juemin =

Juemin is a Chinese given name. People with this name include:

- Lin Juemin (1887–1911), Chinese revolutionary
- Yu Juemin (born 1960), Chinese volleyball player and coach
- Gao Juemin, a character from Family (Ba Jin novel)

== See also ==
- Chio Min (觉民; Juémín), group of four schools in Malaysia
