= Denominational education in the Republic of Ireland =

Education in the Republic of Ireland is mostly denominational at primary and secondary level. That is to say, most schools are associated with a particular religion or Christian denomination. Denominational schools include most national schools at primary level, which types are publicly funded by the Department of Education. The school's patron or the chair of the board of management will often be a cleric or religious. The denomination influences the ethos, although in subjects other than religion a standard curriculum is prescribed by the Department of Education for all publicly funded schools. Denominational schools can give priority of admission to pupils of the given denomination with the exception of Catholic schools but not refuse to admit pupils based on religion.

The continued prominence of denominational education is controversial among advocates of separation of church and state. Since the 1970s Educate Together and other groups have founded multi-denominational schools. In addition, the prevalence of Catholic schools is questioned in light of Ireland's changing demographic profile brought about by secularisation and immigration since the Celtic Tiger. The Catholic Archbishop of Dublin, Diarmuid Martin, has expressed a desire to divest the archdiocese of some of its schools to provide more choice for non-Catholic parents.

== Church schools ==
In Ireland, the vast majority of the country's primary schools are owned or managed (or both) by religious organisations. As of 2021 of the national total of 3,126 standard schools, 2760 (88%) had Catholic patrons, 172 (5.7%) were controlled by the Anglican-associated Church of Ireland, 1% were controlled by other religious organisations while 168 (5.4%) were controlled by organisations which were not affiliated with any particular religion. This system of religious control was instituted according to the Stanley Letter of 1831. Amongst the country's secondary schools, voluntary secondary schools, comprehensive schools and community schools, the majority are controlled by non- Catholic organisations.

Around 2010 Fintan O'Toole criticised this aspect of the educational system, as has Seán Flynn, education correspondent of The Irish Times. In 2007 former Taoiseach Garret FitzGerald also criticised the denominational system. The Humanist Association of Ireland, Atheist Ireland and other groups have likewise objected to the denominational system, believing that it introduces artificial divisions within Irish society. The Irish Primary Principals Network conducted a survey that found that 72% of parents wanted primary schools to be managed by the state with all religions given equal opportunity.

As of 2013, the Church of Ireland ranked "second in the State in terms of the provision of primary schools with 174 schools under its Patronage." There were "over 500 teachers and over 13,500 pupils in Church of Ireland Primary schools." There were at the time "twenty post-primary schools in the State which are either affiliated with the Church of Ireland at diocesan level or" are self-identified as Church of Ireland.

In June 2009 and referring obliquely to the events of Diswellstown the previous year (in which the children of parents who were not Catholic, mostly immigrants to the country, were refused entry to the local primary school, producing a group of largely non-white children who had no school to attend) the Archbishop of Dublin, Diarmuid Martin, said that the current denominational system is "not tenable" and that "the current almost monopoly is a historical hangover that doesn't reflect the realities of the times" and has called for the Catholic Church to cede control of many schools. The Irish Catholic Bishops' Conference, however, supports denominational education, as does The Iona Institute, a small organisation based in Dublin which campaigns upon a range of issues of interest to conservative Christians.

== Jewish education ==
There is a small National School partnered with a Secondary School Stratford College in Rathgar, which has a Jewish ethos in Dublin (although the schools now accept children from other denominations due to a dwindling Jewish population). The National/elementary school was set up in 1934 by Rabbi Herzog, as the Zion National School in Bloomfield Avenue. The Secondary School was set up by the Chief Rabbi Jakobovitz and the Jewish community in the 1950s, initially with classes in the Dublin Talmud Torah School, but in 1953 they ceased with the opening of Stratford College. In 1980 the National School moved to the Stratford College location in Rathgar. However throughout the years members of the Jewish community attended schools with a Christian ethos such as the Methodist run Wesley College, Dublin, where the future president of Israel Chaim Herzog attended.

== Islamic education ==
While Muslims do attend Christian ethos schools or multi-denominational schools, in recent years there has been a growth in the number of Muslim National Schools being established, these are funded by the Department of Education. Traditionally Muslim students have attended Christian schools and received Islamic training, separately. There are plans to establish an Islamic secondary school in Dublin.

== See also ==
- Multidenominational school
- Educate Together
- Faith school
- Catholic schools in Canada
- Catholic schools in the United States
- Religious education
