= List of free schools in England which are formally designated as faith schools =

This is a list of open free schools in England which are formally designated as faith schools. It should not include schools which have a faith ethos, but no formal designation as a faith school.

== Church of England free schools ==
=== Primary schools ===
- Abbot Alphege Academy, Bath and North East Somerset
- Barrow 1618 CofE Free School
- Bishop Chavasse School, Kent
- Clearwater Church of England Primary Academy, Gloucestershire
- Malcolm Arnold Preparatory School, Northamptonshire
- Meridian Angel Primary School, Enfield
- Saint Jerome Church of England Bilingual School, Harrow
- St Luke's Church of England Primary, Camden
- St Mary's Church of England Primary Norwood Green, Ealing
- St Mary's Hampton Church of England Primary, Richmond upon Thames
- University Church Free School, Cheshire West and Chester
- West Didsbury CE Primary School, Manchester
- Wynyard Church of England Primary School, Stockton-on-Tees

=== Secondary schools ===
- Becket Keys Church of England Free School, Essex
- The Green School for Boys, Hounslow
- The Royal School, Wolverhampton
- William Perkin Church of England High School, Ealing

== Hindu free schools ==
=== Primary schools ===
- Krishna Avanti Primary School, Leicester
- Krishna Avanti Primary School, Croydon

=== Secondary schools ===
- Avanti House Secondary School, Harrow

== Jewish free schools ==
=== Primary schools ===
- Alma Primary, Barnet
- Eden Primary, Haringey
- Etz Chaim Jewish Primary School, Barnet
- Mosaic Jewish Primary School, Wandsworth
- Rimon Jewish Primary School, Barnet

=== Secondary schools ===
- Leeds Jewish Free School, Leeds

== Multi-faith free schools ==
=== Primary schools ===
- Hallam Fields, Birstall

== Muslim free schools ==
=== Primary schools ===
- Olive School, Preston
- The Olive School Blackburn
- The Olive School Hackney
- The Olive School, Birmingham
- The Olive School, Bolton
- The Olive Tree Primary School Bolton
- Zaytouna Primary School
- Al-Noor Primary School Goodmayse, London

=== Secondary schools ===
- Eden Boys' School, Bolton
- Eden Boys' School, Birmingham
- Eden Boys' Leadership Academy, Birmingham East
- Eden Boys' School, Preston
- Eden Girls' Leadership Academy, Manchester
- Eden Boys' Leadership Academy, Manchester
- Eden Girls' School, Coventry
- Eden Girls' School, Waltham Forest
- Eden Girls' School, Slough
- Tauheedul Islam Boys' High School

== Other Christian faith free schools ==
=== Primary schools ===
- Canary Wharf College, Tower Hamlets
- Canary Wharf College 2, Tower Hamlets
- Emmanuel Community School, Waltham Forest
- Enfield Heights Academy, Enfield
- Hope Community School, Bexley
- Kingston Community School, Kingston upon Thames
- St Mary's Primary School, Dilwyn, Herefordshire
- Tyndale Community School, Oxfordshire
- Watford St John's Church of England Primary School, Hertfordshire

=== Secondary schools ===
- Atherton High School, Wigan
- Fulham Boys School, Hammersmith and Fulham
- King Solomon International Business School, Birmingham
- King's School, Brighton and Hove
- St Andrew the Apostle Greek Orthodox School, Barnet
- Trinity School, Kent

== Other Jewish faith free schools ==
=== Primary schools ===
- Yavneh Primary School, Hertfordshire

== Sikh free schools ==
=== Primary schools ===
- Akaal Primary School, Derby
