= List of free schools in England with a local authority sponsor =

Free schools listed on this page all have formal local authority representation on the board of trustees. The list is not exhaustive.

It is possible for a local authority to sponsor a free school in partnership with other organisations, provided they have no more than a 19.9% representation on the board. In some cases the local authority sponsoring the trust is different to the local authority in which the school resides, so in those cases the partnering local authority has also been listed.

Local Authority	Free School	Academy Trust	Partnering Local Authority
Hertfordshire	Alban City School	Alban City Free School Ltd	N/A
Hertfordshire	Ascot Road Community Free School	West Herts Community Free School Trust	N/A
London Borough of Hackney	City of London Academy, Shoreditch Park	City of London Academies Trust	City of London Corporation
London Borough of Islington	City of London Academy, Highgate Hill	City of London Academies Trust	City of London Corporation
London Borough of Islington	City of London Primary Academy	City of London Academies Trust	City of London Corporation
London Borough of Kingston	The Kingston Academy	Kingston Educational Trust	N/A
London Borough of Redbridge	Beacon Business Innovation Hub	Beacon Multi-Academy Trust Limited	N/A
London Borough of Richmond upon Thames	Richmond upon Thames School	The Richmond Upon Thames School Trust	N/A
London Borough of Southwark	Galleywall Primary Academy	City of London Academies Trust	City of London Corporation
Sunderland	Beacon of Light School	Beacon of Light School	N/A
Worcestershire	ContinU Plus Academy	ContinU Plus Academy Trust	N/A
