= Fair Admissions Campaign =

The Fair Admissions Campaign aims to abolish the faith-based selection of pupils in state funded schools in England and Wales.

== Aims ==
The Fair Admissions Campaign aims to open all state funded schools in England and Wales to all pupils regardless of the religion of pupils or their parents and views the current admissions system as unfair. Although some of the supporting members of the Fair Admissions Campaign are opposed to state-funded faith schools the Fair Admissions Campaign itself is not.

== History ==
Many of the organizations which would later become supporting members of the Fair Admissions campaign wrote a letter to the Secretary of State for Education on 16 December 2012 which called for end to faith-based selection policies at English and Welsh state funded schools.

The Fair Admissions campaign was officially launched in June 2013.

== Support ==
A ComRes poll conducted on behalf of the Accord Coalition indicated that 73% of British adults agreed that 'State funded schools, including state funded faith schools, should not be allowed to select or discriminate against prospective pupils on religious grounds in their admissions policy.'

The Fair Admission Campaign is supported by both local and national organizations including the Accord Coalition, the Association of Teachers and Lecturers, the British Humanist Association, British Muslims for Secular Democracy, ICoCo Foundation, the Centre for Studies on Inclusive Education, Ekklesia, the Hindu Academy, the Liberal Democrat Education Association, Richmond Inclusive Schools Campaign, the Runnymede Trust, the Socialist Educational Association, the General Assembly of Unitarian and Free Christian Churches.

On 8 October 2013 an early day motion was tabled by Barry Sheerman, the motion currently has 12 signatories which include MP's from the Labour Party, Liberal Democrats and Green Party of England and Wales.

== Research ==
The Fair Admissions Campaign aims to generate a map of primary and secondary schools in the England and Wales based on their religious admissions policies and how representative of the local area the intake of the school is socio-economically.

== Law regarding religious selective admissions ==
Section 85 of the Equality Act 2010 provides protection for pupils against discrimination based on protected characteristics, which includes religion and belief, in the admission of the pupil to the school. However there are exemptions for selective admissions based on religion or belief for schools in England and Wales which are :

- Foundation or Voluntary schools (including Voluntary Aided and Voluntary Controlled schools) with religious character
- Listed on the register of independent schools for England or Wales and it is recorded on the register that the school has a religious ethos
- A grant-aided school that is conducted in the interest or a church or denominational body.
