= St Richard Reynolds Catholic College =

Location
- Clifden Road; Twickenham, Greater London, TW1 4LT; England; 51°26′52″N 0°20′03″W

Information
- Type: Academy
- Religious affiliation: Roman Catholic
- Established: 2013
- Local authority: Richmond upon Thames
- Trust: Ascension Catholic Academy Trust
- Department for Education URN: 149297 Tables
- Ofsted: Reports
- Principal: Richard Burke
- Gender: Coeducational
- Age: 4 to 18
- Website: http://www.strichardreynolds.org.uk/

St Richard Reynolds Catholic College is a coeducational all-through Catholic school for pupils aged 4 to 18. It is located in Twickenham, in the London Borough of Richmond upon Thames, England.

The school is named after Saint Richard Reynolds, a Brigittine monk at Syon Abbey who was executed in 1535 for refusing the Oath of Supremacy to King Henry VIII of England. The feast day of St Richard Reynolds is 4 May.

St Richard Reynolds Catholic College consists of a primary school and a high school: St Richard Reynolds Catholic Primary School for pupils aged 4 to 11 and St Richard Reynolds Catholic High School for pupils aged 11 to 18. Both the secondary school and the primary school received outstanding grades as the outcome of their first Ofsted inspection in February 2015 and their second Ofsted inspection in March 2019.

== Performance ==
As with other schools, latest exam results and related data, for both the secondary school and the primary school, are published in the Department for Education's national tables.

== Site ==
The college is located at a site that was originally Twickenham County School for Girls, and subsequently part of Richmond Adult Community College (RACC). The site was temporarily shared until RACC relocated to its other campus in Richmond towards the end of 2014, vacating the Edwardian main building which was refurbished for use by the school in 2015. A new teaching block was constructed on the site in 2017.

== History ==
St Richard Reynolds Catholic College was formally proposed by the Diocese of Westminster, in partnership with the Diocese of Southwark, in January 2012 following a campaign by the local Catholic community and others. (Note: The London Borough of Richmond upon Thames is split between Catholic dioceses in the same way that it is split between Anglican ones. The Diocese of Westminster covers the western half of the borough, and the Diocese of Southwark the eastern half, with the River Thames forming the boundary.) It had also been a 2010 election pledge of the local council administration to "work for a Catholic secondary school".

Richmond Council had purchased a site suitable for the proposed school in July 2011 for £8.45 million. A local campaign group, Richmond Inclusive Schools Campaign (RISC), and local opposition politicians said that a community academy should be considered for the site instead. However, Richmond Council decided to accept the Diocese of Westminster's proposals on 24 May 2012.

The proposals for the primary school included 10 places that would be allocated without reference to faith and, from 2020, those 10 students would also have priority admission to the secondary school. The secondary school would otherwise prioritise admissions for Catholic children. The local MP Vincent Cable, and Education Secretary Michael Gove, expressed an opinion that both schools should leave 50% of their places open to the community, in line with admissions rules for new Faith Academies, but that suggestion was not adopted.

The establishment of the school was the subject of judicial review proceedings, when RISC, backed by the British Humanist Association, unsuccessfully challenged the legality of the process by which it was set up as a voluntary aided school rather than an academy. The judgment set a legal precedent for interpretation of the Education Act 2011, and the school's voluntary aided status enabled it to bypass rules applying to new Faith Academies which would have limited the proportion of students admitted using faith selection criteria to 50%.

The school was formally opened and blessed by Vincent Nichols, Archbishop of Westminster and Peter Smith, Archbishop of Southwark on 19 September 2013.

In September 2014 the college launched a consultation on conversion to academy status, a move which caused controversy in the light of the school's previous preference for voluntary aided status. The school formally converted to academy status in December 2022, and is now sponsored by the Ascension Catholic Academy Trust, but continues to be under the jurisdiction of the Roman Catholic Diocese of Westminster.

== Funding ==
The site for St Richard Reynolds Catholic College was purchased by Richmond upon Thames Council for £8.45m, and subsequently leased to the schools on a peppercorn rent.

At the point when the proposals were accepted, the Diocese of Westminster was expected to bear the capital costs, estimated to be between £5m and £8m, of new build and/or adaptation of existing buildings for the new secondary school. £3m of that was expected to be offset by the school governors through fundraising initiatives. As of the end of the 2013/2014 financial year, the Diocesan contribution was recorded in council accounts as £700K.

Richmond Council was expected to meet the costs of the new primary school, estimated to be £1.5m. They did so as part of a wider primary school expansion programme.

As the college was established in September 2013 as voluntary aided schools, 100% of running costs, amounting to £690k in the school's first financial year, were met by the state. As the decision to open the school was not driven by basic need, concern was expressed that this would mean that funding would come from money that might otherwise have been available to existing schools.

As with all voluntary aided schools Governors were expected to raise 10% of ongoing capital costs. However, in September 2014 the college launched a consultation on conversion to academy status which, if accepted, would mean that in future 100% of both running costs and capital costs would be met by the state. (The ongoing capital costs of initially establishing the secondary school would remain the responsibility of the Diocese of Westminster, but VAT would be reclaimable on those costs after conversion, giving rise to significant financial savings.)

In February 2015, it was announced that St. Richard Reynolds would receive a contribution to its capital costs from the Priority Schools Building Programme.

The schools have also received a substantial donation from the Sir Harold Hood Charitable Trust, which is under the trusteeship of Lord True, who was the leader of Richmond upon Thames Council at the time the school was established, and his wife, Lady True.

== Alumni ==
- Sylvester Jasper (b. 2001) - professional footballer
