= Chio Min Secondary School =

School in Kulim, Kedah, Malaysia

Chio Min Secondary High School
- Chinese: 觉民国民型华文中学; Malay: Sekolah Menengah Jenis Kebangsaan Chio Min

Location
- Jalan Kelang Sago, 09000 Kulim, Kedah, Malaysia; Kulim, Kedah; Malaysia
- Coordinates: 5.374025°N 100.551589°E

Information
- Type: National-type Chinese secondary school
- Motto: 爱吾觉民，忠信篤敬 (Love Chio Min, be loyal and respectful)
- Established: 10 May 1957
- Founder: 林觉民
- School district: Kulim District
- Chairman: Dato Lee Thak Soon
- Administrator: Mr. Lim Poh Lee
- Principal: Mr. Tan Teik Seong (2007---2018); Mdm. Lee Kuen Chin (2019---2021); Mr. Wong Kwang Chen (2021---)
- Teaching staff: 142 (2023)
- Enrollment: approx. 2200 (Year 2007)
- Colours: Blue, yellow, red and white
- Affiliations: Penilaian Menengah Rendah, Sijil Pelajaran Malaysia, Sijil Tinggi Persekolahan Malaysia, Ministry of Education (Malaysia)
- Website: www.smjk.edu.my

Chio Min Secondary School
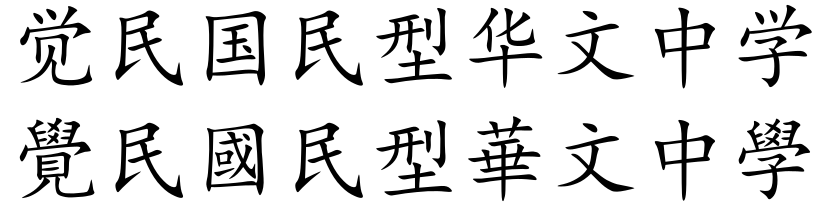
- Chio Min Secondary School in Simplified Chinese (top) and Traditional Chinese character (below)
- Traditional Chinese: 覺民國民型華文中學
- Simplified Chinese: 觉民国民型华文中学
Transcriptions
Standard Mandarin
- Hanyu Pinyin: Juémín Guómínxíng Huáwén Zhōngxué

Chio Min Secondary School (Malay: Sek. Men. J. K. Chio Min; simplified Chinese: 觉民中学; traditional Chinese: 覺民中學) or S.M.J.K. Chio Min (Malay: Sekolah Menengah Jenis Kebangsaan Chio Min; simplified Chinese: 觉民国民型华文中学; traditional Chinese: 覺民國民型華文中學) is a National-type Chinese secondary school located at Kulim in Kedah, Malaysia. It is the only high school in Kulim that places emphasis on education in Chinese language and values.

== History ==
Chio Min Secondary School was established in 1957, which extended from Chio Min Primary School, established on 10 May 1918. In 1942, the Chio Min School had to be closed due to the Japanese invasion. It reopened in 1945. In 1948, the number of students increased to 600 people and there were 100 students studying at night. Night class closed in 1963. In 1957, two new buildings were constructed and Chio Min Secondary School was started. In 1958, the Primary School was renamed Chio Min Primary School A and School B. In 1964, the government issued a total of RM40,000 to build nine new classrooms. Prior to that, in South Kedah there were no Chinese secondary schools for Chinese primary school students to further their studies. Therefore, some people had set up a committee to collect donations from the public to build a new building with 30 classrooms. At that time, the school was located in the Klang Sago, Kulim, Kedah.

In August 2001, Chio Min Secondary School received 1.5 million Ringgit in government funding to build a new four-storey school building which officially opened on 15 January 2002. On 25 March, the first batch of form 6 classes (university preparation class) started. In April 2002, government funding helped to construct a two-story EPU computer room; construction started in April 2002. On 9 February 2003, the Chinese Orchestra was established. In 2004 the school was equipped with more than 100 computers, including computers in conference rooms, library reference room, computer room and the Office of Academic Affairs.

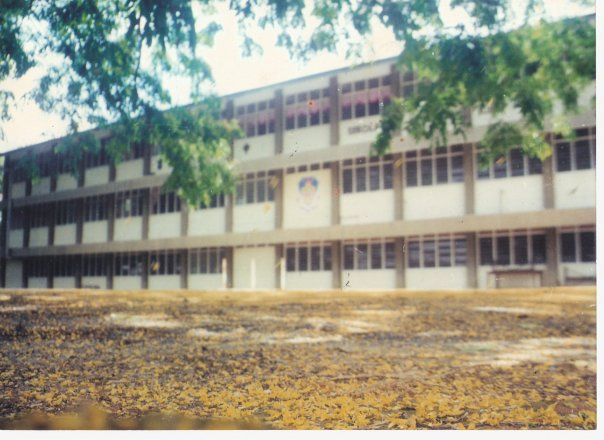
Chio Min D Block

Results

Leo Garden opening ceremony

Founders of Chio Min

== Examinations ==
Chio Min Secondary School has had success in public examinations such as Penilaian Menengah Rendah (PMR), Sijil Pelajaran Malaysia (SPM) and Sijil Tinggi Persekolahan Malaysia (STPM).
