= Chio Min =

Group of schools teaching Chinese culture in Malaysia

Chio Min is the name of a group of schools in Malaysia. There are 4 schools in the group.

== Introduction ==
Chio Min, in Chinese (觉民).

== Member schools ==
- SMJK Chio Min
- SJK(C) Chio Min 'A'
- SJK(C) Chio Min 'B'
- Chio Min Kindergarten (CRC)
