= Free school (England) =

Independent state-funded schools in England

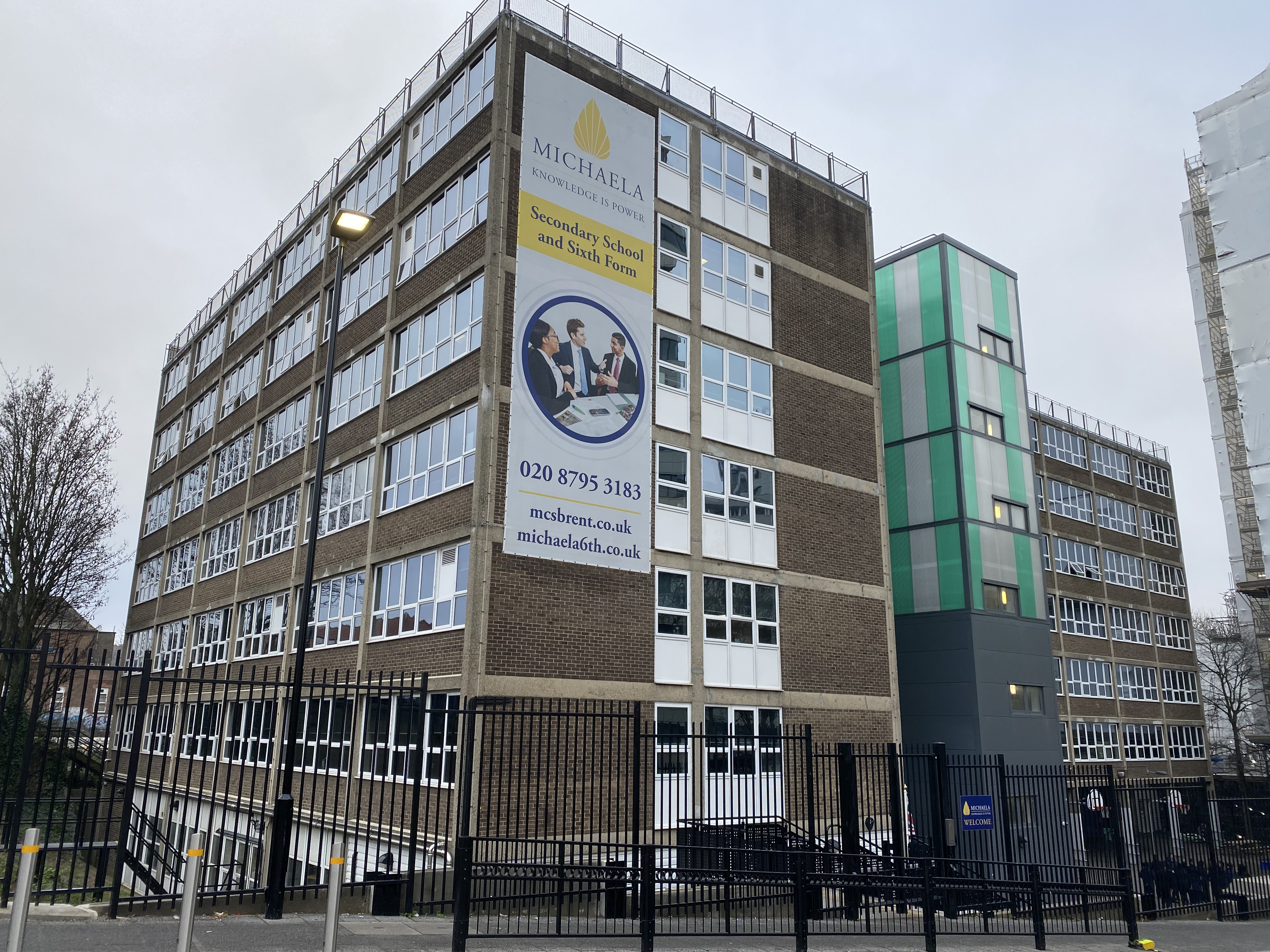
Michaela Community School is a free school with sixth form in London.

A free school in England is a type of academy established since 2010 under the Cameron–Clegg government's free school policy initiative. From May 2015, usage of the term was formally extended to include new academies set up via a local authority competition. Like other academies, free schools are non-profit-making, state-funded schools which are free to attend but which are mostly independent of the local authority. (Note: Free school is not a generic term for any school that does not charge fees.)

== Description ==
Like all academies, free schools are governed by non-profit charitable trusts that sign funding agreements with the Education Secretary. There are different model funding agreements for single academy trusts and multi academy trusts. It is possible for a local authority to sponsor a free school in partnership with other organisations, provided they have no more than a 19.9 per cent representation on the board of trustees. Studio schools and university technical colleges are both sub-types of free school.

== Policy creation and implementation ==
Free schools were introduced by the Conservative-Liberal Democrat coalition following the 2010 general election as part of the Big Society initiative to make it possible for parents, teachers, charities and businesses to set up their own schools. Free schools are an extension of the existing academies programme. The Academies Act 2010, which allowed all existing state schools to become academies, also authorised the creation of free schools. The first 24 free schools opened in autumn 2011.

The Education Act 2011 gave rise to the academy/free school presumption; Government advice which clarified that any local authority in need of a new school must in most circumstances seek proposals for an academy or free school, with a traditional community school only being allowed if no suitable free school or academy is proposed. In July 2015 the advice was renamed the free school presumption reflecting the fact that the newly elected Conservative Government regarded all new academies established after May 2015 as free schools.

=== Similar models in other countries ===
The free school concept is based on similar schools found in Sweden, Chile, New Zealand (an overlap between designated special character schools and partnership schools), Canada, and the United States. The concept has been compared to charter schools in Canada and the US.

== Requirements ==
Free schools are subject to the same School Admissions Code as all other state-funded schools, although they are subject to the 50% Rule whereby oversubscribed free schools with a faith designation must allocate at least half of their places without regard to faith.

Free schools are expected to offer a broad and balanced curriculum, are subject to the same Ofsted inspections as all other maintained schools and are expected to comply with standard performance measures.

To set up a free school, founding groups submit applications to the Department for Education. Groups include those run by parents, education charities and religious groups. Start-up grants are provided to establish the schools and ongoing funding is on an equivalent basis with other locally controlled state maintained schools.

== Types of free school ==
The majority of free schools are similar in size and shape to other types of academy. However, the following are distinctive sub-types of free school:

- Studio school – A small free school, usually with around 300 pupils, using project-based learning
- University Technical College – A free school for the 14–18 age group, specialising in practical, employment-focused subjects, sponsored by a university, employer or further education college.
- Maths school – A selective sixth form free school for those with significant mathematical aptitude, specialising in mathematics. They are sponsored by a selective mathematics university.

=== Waves ===
The Department for Education publishes and maintains the list of established free schools and those that are due to be established.

Free schools approvals are processed and announced in batches, known as 'waves'.

Wave 1: In the autumn of 2010, Education Secretary Michael Gove announced that 16 proposals for free schools had been given a green light by the Government and were expected to open in September 2011.

This number eventually grew to 24. Five of the original 16 schools were faith schools: two Jewish, one Evangelical Anglican, one Hindu and one Sikh.

Wave 2: In September 2012 the Department of Education announced 55 new free schools would open that month.

Wave 3: The DfE received 234 applications for the third wave of free schools, of which 102 were approved to progress to the pre-opening stage. The schools were due to open in September 2013.

Wave 4: Free schools wishing to open in September 2014 submitted proposals to the DfE in January 2013. In May 2013 it was announced that 102 schools had been approved.

Waves 5,6,7: In March 2013, the Department for Education announced the application schedule for groups wishing to open free schools in 2015 and beyond. The Wave 5 pre-approvals were announced in January 2014, with 11 new schools being approved. Five months later another 38 were pre-approved for Wave 6, and in September of the same year, a further 35 schools were pre-approved for Wave 7.

Wave 8: In January 2014, the Department for Education confirmed that there would be an eighth free school wave, with applications being accepted in the Autumn of 2014. The outcome was announced in March 2015, when it was confirmed that 49 applications had been pre-approved.

Wave 9: In July 2014, a further funding round was announced for the period immediately following the 2015 General Election, with proposals being invited for submission from 8 May 2015. The Conservative Party manifesto for that election included a proposal for at least 500 further free schools. On 2 September 2015, it was announced that 18 applications had been successful in reaching Wave 9's pre-approval stage.

Wave 10 and beyond: In July 2015, the recently elected Conservative Government invited a tenth wave of free school applications to be submitted in October the same year. They also said that there would be further waves with closing dates in March and September each year for the rest of the Parliament. The Parliament had been expected to end in May 2020, but in the event it was dissolved on 3 May 2017.

Between 2010 and 2015 more than 400 free schools were approved for opening in England by the Coalition Government, representing more than 230,000 school places across the country, and numbers have continued to grow since that time. As of June 2024, more than 650 had opened, and a number were seeking sites in order to open.

=== Closures ===
By 2018, 66 free schools had totally or partially closed, or failed to open entirely, at an estimated cost of almost £150 million in startup costs and capital funding. Nineteen had fully closed.

By 2025, 67 free schools had closed or failed to open, built with £325 million of capital funding provided by central government.

=== Qualification of teachers ===
Unlike local authority maintained schools in England, but in common with other types of academy and with independent schools, free schools are allowed to employ teachers without Qualified Teacher Status (QTS). The Coalition government said this freedom enables "innovation, diversity and flexibility" and "the dynamism that characterises the best independent schools". The Labour Party have expressed their opposition to this and said that if elected they would require teachers in academies and free schools be "properly qualified".

== Discussion ==
When the free school policy was first announced, some commentators offered advice to potential proposers, while others expressed scepticism that the concept could be made to work at all. Supporters of free schools, such as the Conservative Party, said that they would "create more local competition and drive-up standards". They also felt they would allow parents to have more choice in the type of education their child receives, much like parents who send their children to independent schools do. However, critics argued that the policy would benefit only middle-class parents with the time to set up free schools and that they would divert money away from existing schools. Supporters of free schools said that they would benefit children from all backgrounds. Some people were concerned that free schools are not obliged to cap their headteachers' pay.

A review of available research on the Swedish model that partially inspired the policy was published in a paper by Rebecca Allen. It concluded, "The econometric evidence on the effect of the reforms suggests that, so far, Swedish pupils do not appear to be harmed by the competition from private schools, but the new schools have not yet transformed educational attainment in Sweden." Peter Wilby, writing in The Guardian, predicted that free schools would be run by private companies rather than parents, teachers or voluntary groups. The New Schools Network was subsequently set up to help groups develop the skills needed to set up free schools. Paul Carter, a Conservative councillor, pointed out that under the funding arrangements in place at the time, "the more academies and Free Schools you operate, under the current academy funding arrangements, the less [money] maintained schools would get." Subsequently, the Department for Education changed the funding arrangements for all maintained schools so that "schools in similar circumstances and with similar intakes receive similar levels of funding", whatever type of school they are.

A warning by the National Union of Teachers (NUT) that the policy would "fuel social segregation and undermine local democracy" was reported in The Daily Telegraph. The NUT also said that free schools were neither wanted nor needed, based on a survey of a thousand parents. The Education Secretary accused free school opponents of subjecting supporters to personal attacks and even death threats. The Department for Education said that free schools were popular with parents. Figures released in 2013 showed that 90% of free schools were over-subscribed with an average of three pupils competing for each place. Critics pointed out that more than half of free schools opening in 2012 opened with 60% or less of the student numbers predicted by the impact assessment documents of each institution, leaving more than 10% spare places.

Analysis by the British Humanist Association in 2013 found that the majority of free school applications were from religious groups. The Catholic Education Service said that it would not open free schools because their admissions rules would only let them reserve 50% of places for children from Catholic families, unlike Voluntary Aided schools which can select up to 100% of places using faith criteria. Education Secretary Michael Gove said in 2011 he had ruled out religious fundamentalist groups being able to set up free schools.

In April 2014, following publication of a leaked document 'Future Academy System' prepared for schools minister Lord Nash, critics claimed that failing free schools were being given special fast-track attention by the government to limit potential embarrassment to Michael Gove, the Education Secretary at the time. The leaked document stated that the "political ramifications of any more free schools being judged inadequate are very high and speedy intervention is essential."

The centre-right think tank Policy Exchange said in 2015 that free schools affected the performance of the pupils in surrounding schools. Their assessment was that the results in low-performing schools located in the vicinity of a free school out-performed similar schools that do not have a free school nearby, and also that free schools were eight times more likely to be in England's most deprived areas than the least deprived.

Polling in April 2015 put public support for Conservative proposals to increase the number of free schools by at least 500 at 26%. The 2015 Labour Party election manifesto proposed banning the creation of free schools in areas where there was a surplus of places.

The free school concept has been described as a government obsession which should be abandoned as a failed experiment; the joint general secretary of the National Education Union (NEU) said in 2018: "The government should hang its head in shame at this monumental waste of taxpayers' money at a time when schools are severely underfunded".

The schools have proven to be unexpectedly expensive, with the government being taken to task for failure to do due diligence on sites and to publish an accounting of costs.

== See also ==
- List of free schools in England which are formally designated as faith schools
- List of free schools in England with a local authority sponsor
- List of schools in England
- New Schools Network
- State-funded schools (England)

Types of free school in addition to those designated "free school":

- Academy (English school)
- Studio school
- University Technical College
- Maths school
