= Catholic Education Service =

English Catholic educational organization

The Catholic Education Service (CES) is an agency of the Catholic Bishops’ Conference of England and Wales (CBCEW), whose object is the advancement of the Christian religion, primarily through education.

== History ==
The CES has its roots in the Catholic Poor School Committee founded in 1847.

At this time with the restoration of the Catholic hierarchy the work of the committee focused on primary education and there was an expectation among the clergy that where finances would not permit the building of both a church and a school, building a school should take precedence, thus serving as the focal point and place of worship for the local Catholic community until a church could also be built.

The Secondary Education Council was added and in 1905 the Catholic Education Council (CEC) for England and Wales was established. Although the responsibilities did not change with the CEC's development into CES in 1991, the ways in which these would be achieved did change and continue to evolve in order to respond to contemporary needs.

== Controversy ==
Former CES director, Oona Stannard, described the sex relationships education (SRE) bill as a 'positive step forward' despite the then Education Secretary, Ed Balls, when asked about the any opt out for faith schools in the bill, stating 'there is no watering down and also there is no opt out for any faith school from teaching the full, broad, balanced curriculum on sex relationship education.'

The Catholic Education Service declined to participate in the Coalition Government's flagship Free School programme, because schools created under that scheme could not prioritise 100% of their places for Catholic children.

== Governance ==
Trustees:

The Most Reverend Malcolm McMahon OP, Archbishop of Liverpool;
The Right Reverend John Sherrington, Auxiliary Bishop of Westminster.

Management Committee:

The Most Reverend Malcolm McMahon OP, Archbishop of Liverpool;
The Right Reverend Peter Doyle, Bishop of Northampton;
The Right Reverend John Sherrington, Auxiliary Bishop of Westminster;
The Reverend Monsignor Marcus Stock;
The Reverend Father John Weatherill;
Mrs Kate Griffin;

Chairman: The Right Reverend Marcus Stock, Bishop of Leeds, elected in May 2019.

Director: Paul Barber

Deputy Director: Mr Greg Pope (2010–2017)
