= Voluntary controlled school =

Type of state-funded school in England, Wales and Northern Ireland

A voluntary controlled school (VC school) is a state-funded school in England and Wales in which a foundation or trust (usually a Christian denomination) has some formal influence in the running of the school. Such schools have less autonomy than voluntary aided schools, in which the foundation pays part of any building costs.

Originally the term is derived from the funding of the schools through voluntary subscriptions and contributions. Although it is also the case that these are schools previously independent of local or national government that volunteered to be controlled by the state.

== Characteristics ==
Voluntary controlled schools are a kind of "maintained school", meaning that they are funded by central government via the local authority, and do not charge fees to students. The majority are also faith schools.

The land and buildings are typically owned by a charitable foundation, which also appoints about a quarter of the school governors. However, the local authority employs the school's staff and has primary responsibility for the school's admission arrangements. Specific exemptions from Section 85 of the Equality Act 2010 enables VC faith schools to use faith criteria in prioritising pupils for admission to the schools.

Pupils at voluntary controlled schools follow the National Curriculum.

== History ==
The state began to provide elementary education in 1870 and secondary education in 1902, but also continued to increase funding to the schools run by other organisations (usually the churches), now known as voluntary schools. The Voluntary Schools Act 1897 refers to school income 'derived from voluntary contributions, rates, school fees, endowments, or any source whatever other than the Parliamentary grant' and specifically defines a voluntary school as a public elementary day school not provided by a school board'. Following the aforementioned Act these schools were increasingly influenced by the state, and were subject to jointly administered inspections.

The Education Act 1944 imposed higher standards on school facilities, and offered voluntary schools a choice in funding the costs this would incur.

- Voluntary controlled schools would have all their costs met by the state, but would be controlled by the local education authority.
- Voluntary aided schools would have all of their running costs met by the state, but their capital costs would only be partially state funded, with the foundation retaining greater influence over the school.

The Roman Catholic Church chose to retain control of its schools, while more than half of Church of England schools became voluntary controlled.

By 2008, in England, approximately 15% of primary schools were voluntary controlled, almost all of them associated with the Church of England. Only 3% of secondary schools were voluntary controlled, of which about half were Church of England schools.

In 2012, the Fair Admissions Campaign began to encourage local authorities to stop using faith criteria in admissions policies for VC schools.

== See also ==
- Voluntary aided school
- State-funded schools (England)
- Education in Wales
- Education in Northern Ireland
- Public education in the United Kingdom
