= Voluntary aided school =

Type of school in England and Wales

A voluntary aided school (VA school) is a state-funded school in England and Wales in which a foundation or trust (usually a religious organisation) contributes to building costs and has a substantial influence in the running of the school. In most cases the foundation or trust owns the buildings. Such schools have more autonomy than voluntary controlled schools, which are entirely funded by the state. In some circumstances local authorities can help the governing body in buying a site, or can provide a site or building free of charge.

Originally the term is derived from the funding of the schools through voluntary subscriptions and contributions. Although it is also the case that these are schools previously independent of local or national government that volunteered to be aided by the state.

Hong Kong's education system also has aided (Chinese: 資助) schools.

== Characteristics ==
The running costs of voluntary aided schools, like those of other state-maintained schools, are fully paid by central government via the local authority. They differ from other maintained schools in that only 90% of their capital costs are met by the state, with the school's foundation contributing the remaining 10%. Many VA faith schools belong to diocesan maintenance schemes or other types of funding programme to help them to manage those costs. VA schools are not allowed to charge fees to students, although parents are usually encouraged to pay a voluntary contribution towards the schools' maintenance funds.

The foundation usually owns the school's land and buildings, although there are instances where VA schools use local authority land and buildings. The foundation appoints a majority of the school governors, who run the school, employ the staff and decide the school's admission arrangements, subject to the national Schools Admissions Code. Specific exemptions from Section 85 of the Equality Act 2010 enables VA faith schools to use faith criteria in prioritising pupils for admission to the schools.

Pupils at voluntary aided schools follow the National Curriculum. Like all faith schools, VA faith schools may teach religious education according to their own faith.

== History ==
Prior to the 19th century, there were a variety of schools in England and Wales, from charity schools providing basic education for the poor to endowed schools (often grammar schools) providing secondary or all-age education. Early in that century, the British and Foreign School Society and the National Society for Promoting Religious Education sought to provide elementary schooling for poor children, setting up non-denominational British Schools and Church of England National schools respectively. From 1833, the state began to provide grants to support these elementary schools and the less wealthy endowed schools. They were joined by the Catholic Poor School Committee, which established Roman Catholic elementary schools and received its first state grant in 1847. Secondary education also expanded at the same time, including a series of Roman Catholic secondary schools established by religious orders.

The state began to provide elementary education in 1870 and secondary education in 1902, but also continued to increase funding to the schools run by other organisations (usually the churches), now known as voluntary schools. The Voluntary Schools Act 1897 refers to school income "derived from voluntary contributions, rates, school fees, endowments, or any source whatever other than the Parliamentary grant" and specifically defines a voluntary school as "a public elementary day school not provided by a school board". Following the aforementioned act these schools were increasingly influenced by the state, and were subject to jointly administered inspections.

In 1926, secondary voluntary schools were required to choose between being "grant-aided" by the local authority, or receiving a "direct grant" from central government. Under the Education Act 1944, most of the direct grant schools became direct grant grammar schools. The act also imposed higher standards on school facilities, and offered the remaining voluntary schools a choice in funding the costs this would incur:

- Voluntary controlled schools would have all their costs met by the state, and would be controlled by the local education authority.
- Voluntary aided schools would have all of their running costs met by the state, but their capital costs would only be partly state funded, with the foundation retaining greater influence over school admission policies, staffing and curriculum.

The Catholic Church chose to retain control of all of its schools, while more than half of Church of England schools became voluntary controlled. The state contribution to capital works for voluntary aided schools was originally 50%. It was increased to 75% by the Education Act 1959, and is now 90%.

== Education Act 1975 ==
By the mid-1970s, under Harold Wilson's second Labour government, most local authorities were in the final stages of reorganising secondary education along comprehensive lines. The Roman Catholic hierarchy supported this change. Some non-Catholic voluntary aided grammar schools opposed it. Local authorities could not compel voluntary aided schools to change any aspect of their admissions, but they could submit a proposal to the minister to cease to maintain a school. This was done in cases where the local authority and school could not agree. Some of these schools became private schools:

Former voluntary aided schools that became independent
Year	LEA	Name of school	Gender
1975	Richmond	Hampton School	Boys
1976	Surrey	Reigate Grammar School	Boys (now mixed)
1977	Inner London	Emanuel School	Boys (now mixed)
1977	Surrey	Royal Grammar School, Guildford	Boys
1977	Inner London	Godolphin and Latymer School	Girls
1977	Inner London	Colfe's Grammar School	Mixed
1978	Kirklees	Batley Grammar School	Boys (now mixed)
1978	Surrey	Sir William Perkins's School	Girls
1979	Wolverhampton	Wolverhampton Grammar School	Boys (now mixed)
1979	Lancashire	Kirkham Grammar School	Mixed
1979	Hampshire	King Edward VI School	Boys (now mixed)
1979	Hampshire	Churcher's College	Boys (now mixed)
1983	Cambridgeshire	Wisbech Grammar School	Mixed

Direct grant status was abolished at the same time; over 40 such schools, almost all Roman Catholic, converted to voluntary aided status. Many voluntary aided schools had converted to grant-maintained status in the late 1980s, generally reverting to voluntary aided status when grant-maintained status was abolished in 1998. A few formerly independent faith schools that had become grant-maintained in the early 1990s also converted to voluntary aided status at that time.

By 2008, within the maintained sector in England, approximately 22% of primary schools and 17% of secondary schools were voluntary aided, including all of the Roman Catholic schools and the schools of non-Christian faiths. Almost all voluntary aided primary schools and 93% of voluntary aided secondary schools were linked to a religious body, usually either the Church of England or the Catholic Church, with a minority of other faiths.

In November 2012, the interpretation of the Education Act 2011, which appeared to prioritise the creation of academies over maintained schools, was tested by a judicial review, which upheld the decision of the London Borough of Richmond upon Thames to establish voluntary aided schools, St Richard Reynolds Catholic College, without first seeking proposals for an academy.

== See also ==
- Voluntary controlled school
- State-funded schools (England)
- Education in Wales
- Public education in the United Kingdom
- Charter school
- Education Act 1902
