= Education in Malaysia =

Ministry of Education
- Minister of Education: Fadhlina Sidek

National education budget (2026)
- Budget: RM66.2 billion (US$16.25 billion)

General details
- Primary languages: Malay (Official); English; Mandarin; Tamil
- System type: National
- Established: 1956

Literacy (2022)
- Total: 95.8% (all 15 yrs and above)
- Male: 96.8%
- Female: 94.7%

Enrollment
- Total: 5,407,865 with 405,716 teachers (ratio 13:1), incl. 163,746 pre-school
- Primary: 2,899,228 (survival rate to last primary grade, Grade 6 is 99%)
- Secondary: 2,344,891 (66% male & 72% female students move up to Secondary 1 from Primary 6 – some studies suggest that some of the remaining 34% and 28% switch to private institutions after secondary school)

Education in Malaysia is overseen by the Ministry of Education (Malay: Kementerian Pendidikan). Although education is the responsibility of the Federal Government, each state and federal territory has an Education Department to co-ordinate educational matters in its territory. The main legislation governing education is the Education Act 1996.

Education spending usually makes up about 14 per cent of the annual national budget, the biggest allocation among all. The education system in Malaysia is divided into five stages: preschool education, primary education, secondary education, post-secondary education and tertiary education. It is further divided into national and private education. Education may be obtained from the multilingual national school system, which provides free education for all Malaysians, or private schools, or through homeschooling. International and private institutions charge school fees. By law, primary education is compulsory since 2003. Secondary education is expected to be compulsory, with the relevant amendment bill tabled in July 2025. Standardised tests are a common feature as in many Asia-Pacific countries such as the Republic of Korea, Singapore and Japan. Currently, there are 20 public universities, 54 private universities, 39 private university colleges, 10 foreign university branch campuses, 331 private colleges, 36 polytechnics and 105 community colleges in Malaysia.

== History ==
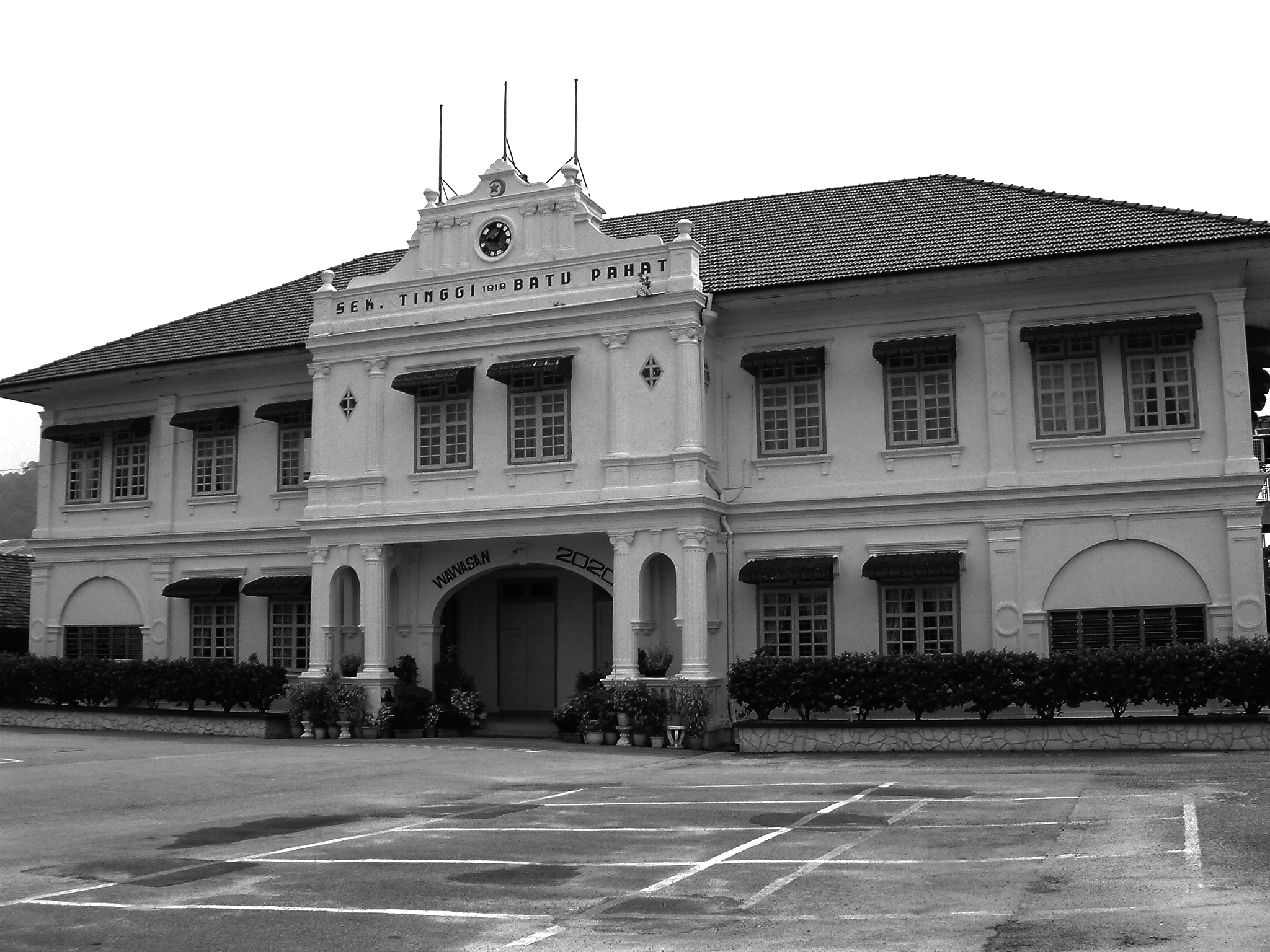
Batu Pahat Secondary School in Johor.

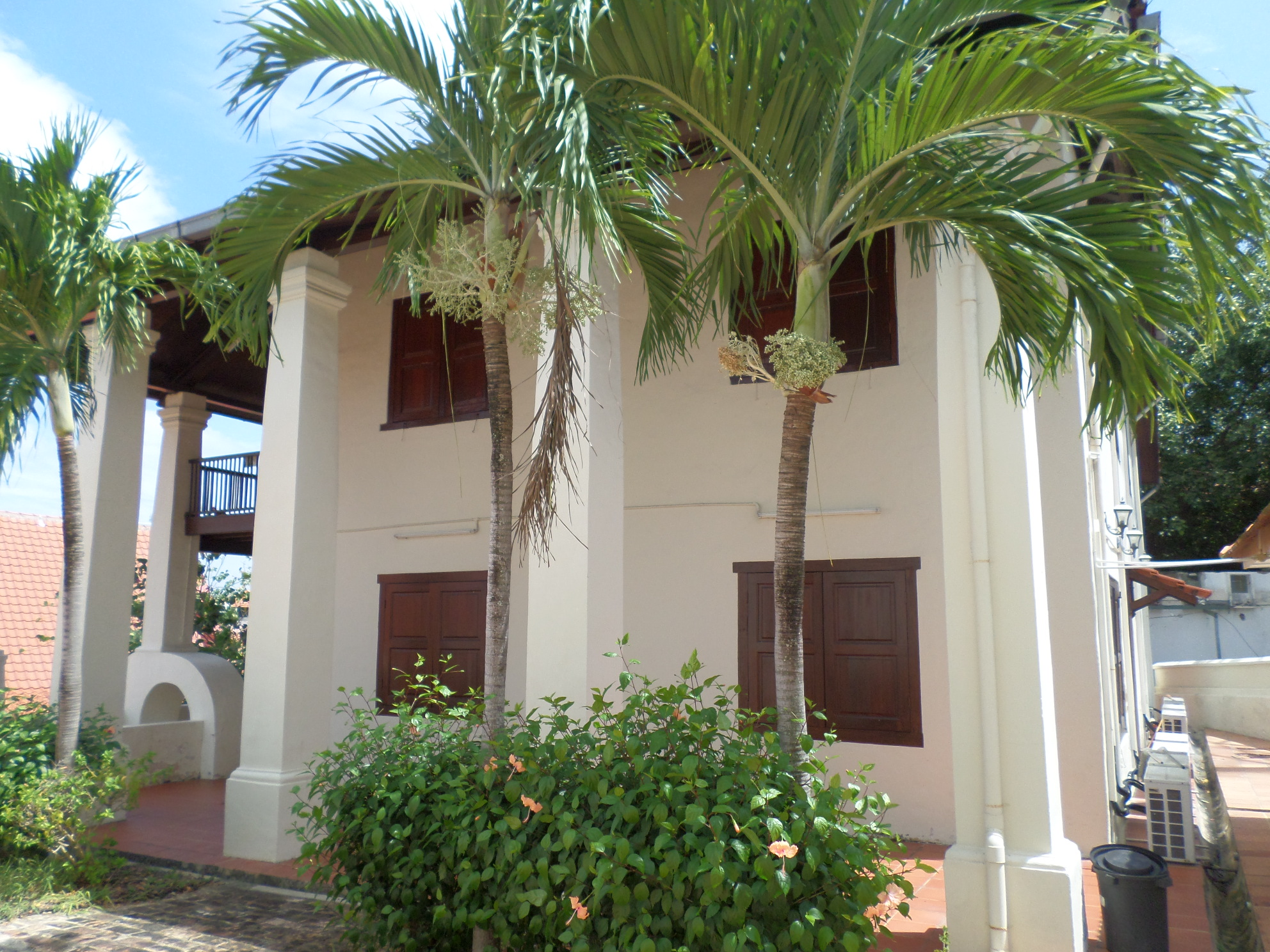
Education Museum in Malacca.

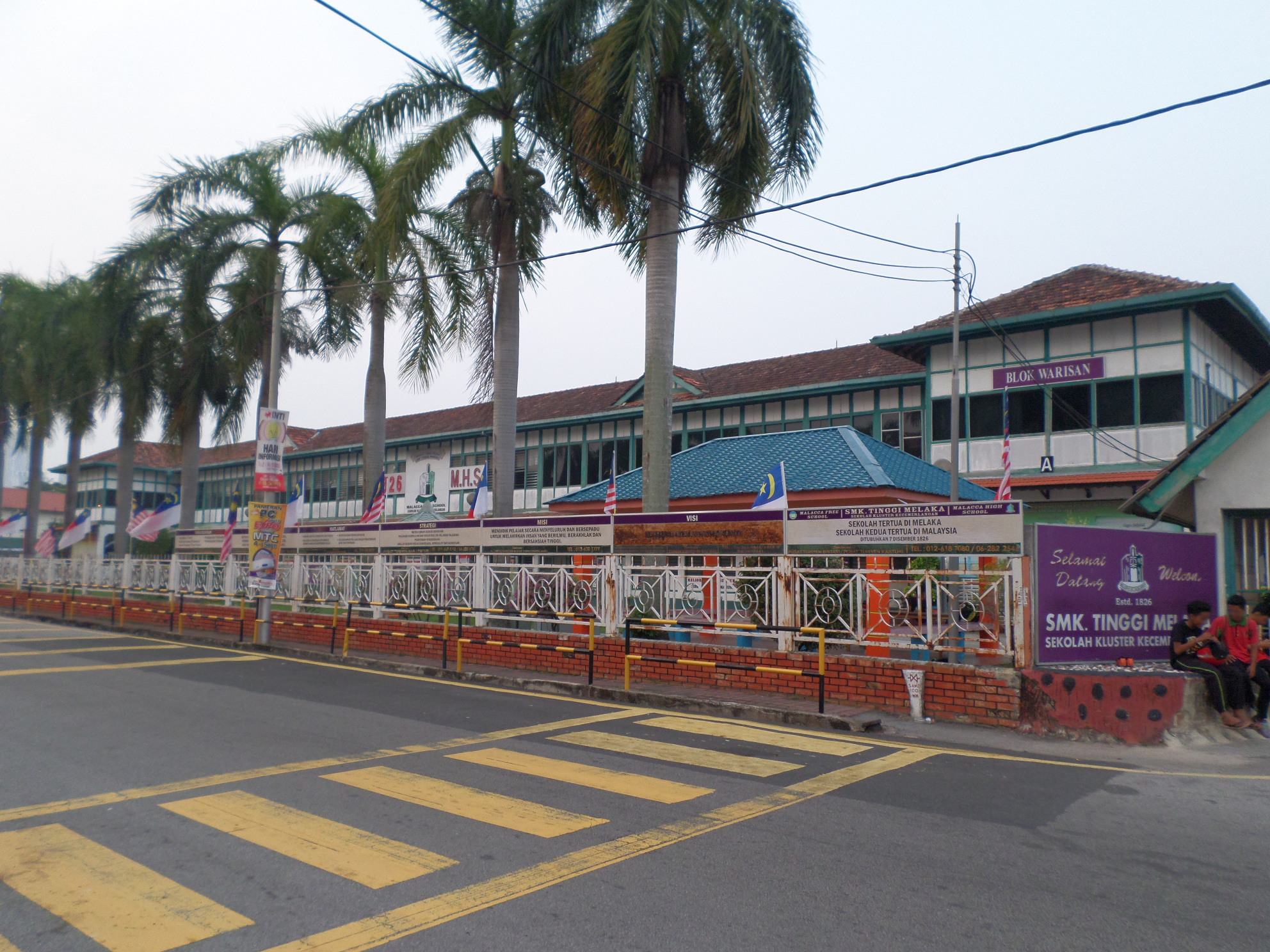
Malacca High School in Malacca, the second oldest recorded high school in Malaysia.

=== Origins ===
Sekolah pondok (literally, "hut school"), madrasah and other Islamic schools were the earliest forms of schooling available in Malaysia. Early works of Malay literature such as Hikayat Abdullah mention these schools indicating they pre-date the current secular model of education. Some madrasah came under the control of state religious councils formed under precedent sultanates, which continue to this day.

=== British colonial period ===
Many of the earliest schools in Malaysia were founded in the Straits Settlements which included Penang and Malacca. The oldest English-language school in Malaya is the Penang Free School, founded in 1816; followed by Malacca High School; St. Xavier's Institution in George Town; King Edward VII School in Taiping and the Anglo Chinese School in Klang. Many of these traditionally English-language schools are considered quite prestigious, they however are located in urban areas across Malaya populated by Chinese tin miners and merchants who were governed to be isolated away from the Malay population in rice fields of the villages (kampungs) and Indians in rubber estates altogether relatively unintegrated from each other with their own Malay and Tamil vernacular schools; only subsequent future generations of these Chinese workers benefitted socioeconomically by proximity to this English-medium system by the early 1910s.

British historian Richard O. Winstedt worked to improve the education of the Malays and was instrumental in establishing Sultan Idris Training College with the purpose of producing Malay teachers. Richard James Wilkinson helped established the Malay College Kuala Kangsar in 1905 which aimed to educate the Malay elite.

Initially, the British colonial government did not provide for any Malay-language secondary schools, forcing those who had studied in Malay during primary school to adjust to an English-language education should they have the opportunity to commence secondary education. Colonial reports affirmed that the limits of Malay to only primary level education are intended merely "to make the son of the fisherman or peasant a more intelligent fisherman or peasant than his father had been". Many Malays failed to pursue additional education due to this issue; even Sultan Idris Shah I of Perak criticised the intended effect of this policy's design as such during the 1903 Conference of Rulers. Despite these high-profile criticisms, the British Director of Education stated:

It would be contrary to the considered policy of government to afford to a community, the great majority of whose members find congenial livelihood and independence in agricultural pursuits, more extended facilities for the learning of English which would be likely to have the effect of inducing them to abandon those pursuits.

Malay representatives in the Federal Council as well as the Legislative Council of Singapore responded vehemently, with one calling the British policy "a policy that trains the Malay boy how not to get employment" by excluding the Malays from learning in the "bread-earning language of Malaya". He remarked:

In the fewest possible words, the Malay boy is told 'You have been trained to remain at the bottom, and there you must always remain!' Why, I ask, waste so much money to attain this end when without any vernacular school, and without any special effort, the Malay boy could himself accomplish this feat?

To remedy this problem, the British established the Malay College Kuala Kangsar in 1905. However, it was mainly intended as a way to educate low-level civil servants and not as a means to opening the doors of commerce to the Malays – the school was never intended to prepare students for entrance to higher institutions of education. This is further facilitated with the Malay Administrative Service programme emerging in 1910 following pressure on a "colour bar" of non-European enrolment into the precedent Malayan Civil Service under the governorship of John Anderson in 1904, workforce intake numbers connected to such available education however were very limited well into the 1940s.

=== Decolonisation and independence ===
In the 1950s, there had been four initial proposals for developing the national education system: the Barnes Report (favoured by the Malays), Ordinance Report (modification of the Barnes Report), the Fenn-Wu Report (favoured by the Chinese and Indians), and the Razak Report (a compromise between the two reports). The Barnes proposal was implemented through the 1952 Education Ordinance amidst Chinese protests. In 1956, the Razak Report was adopted by the Malayan government as the education framework for independent Malaya. The Razak Report called for a national school system consisting of Malay, English, Chinese and Tamil-medium schools at the primary level, and Malay and English-medium schools at the secondary schools, with a uniform national curriculum regardless of the medium of instruction. Malay-medium schools would be known as "national", while other languages schools would be known as "national-type".

In the early years following the 1957 Malaysian Independence Act, existing Chinese, Tamil and mission schools accepted government funding and were allowed to retain their medium of instructions on the condition that they adopt the national curriculum. Chinese secondary schools were given the options of accepting government funding and change into English national-type schools or remain Chinese and private without government funding. Most of the schools accepted the change, although a few rejected the offer and came to be known as Chinese independent high schools. Shortly after the change, some of the national-type schools reestablished their Chinese independent high school branches. All remaining nationalised schools underwent a gradual implementation of Malay as the main medium of education in the 1970s, though English remained a compulsory subject in their syllabus.

In 1996, the Education Act of 1996 was passed to amend the Education Ordinance of 1956 and the Education Act of 1961. In 2004, the Ministry of Education was split into two: the Ministry of Education and the Ministry of Higher Education. The latter handles matters regarding tertiary education. After a brief merging of the two departments in 2013, they again split in 2015. After the 2018 general election, the ministry became a higher education division under the MOE. In the Muhyiddin cabinet, the higher education division was separated again from the Ministry of Education to form as a new ministry since 10 March 2020. It is split as of 2023.

In late December 2021, the Kuala Lumpur High Court ruled that Chinese and Tamil vernacular schools were consistent with Articles 152 (1) (a) and (b) of the Malaysian Constitution, rejecting a lawsuit by three NGOs – Gabungan Pelajar Melayu Semenanjung (GPMS), the Islam Education Development Council (Mappim) and the Confederation of Malaysian Writers Association (Gapena) – seeking to ban vernacular schools on the grounds they were inconsistent with the Malaysian Constitution. The High Court's ruling was welcomed by Malaysian Chinese Association secretary-general Datuk Chong Sin Woon, Deputy Education Minister and Malaysian Indian Congress member Datuk P. Kamalanathan, and Democratic Action Party assemblyman Ronnie Liu. However, the NGOs now want the Federal Court to decide on vernacular schools’ constitutionality after the lower courts judgement.

=== Private missionary schools ===
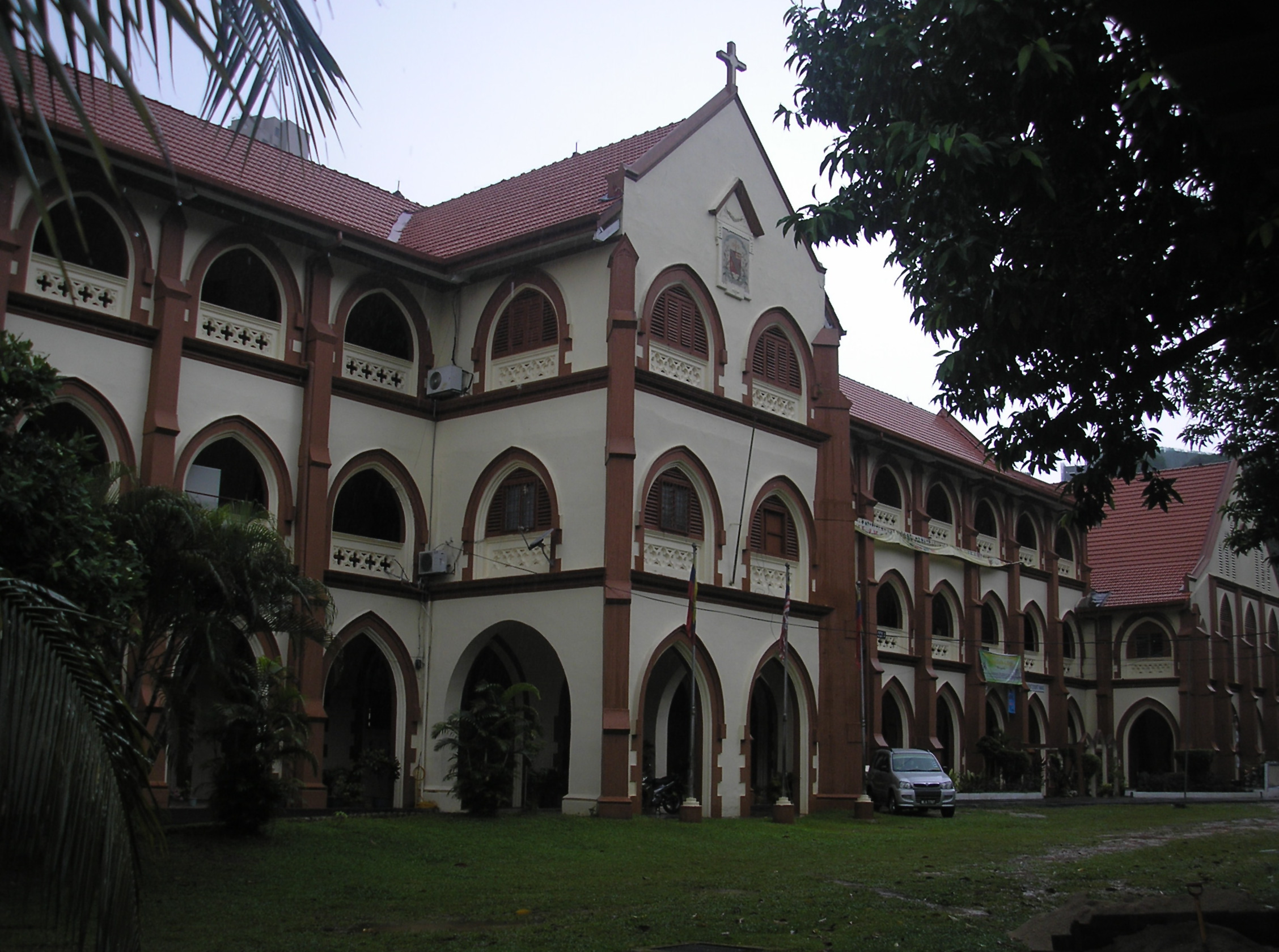
Convent of the Holy Infant Jesus, established in 1899 in Kuala Lumpur

During the British colonial period, missionaries of Christian denominations, such as the Roman Catholic religious orders – particularly the Lasallian Brothers and the Sisters of the Holy Infant Jesus – Seventh-day Adventists, Anglicans, and Methodists, established a series of "private missionary schools" which provided primary and secondary education in the English language. Almost all of these were single-sex schools. These schools were fee-paying and some had boarding schools attached to them. They were seen as "providing the best education" as they used "English as their medium of instruction". Although nowadays these missionary schools have fully assimilated into the Malay-medium national school system and most admit students regardless of gender and background, many of the schools remain single-sex and still bear their original names, such as the ones with the names of saints or words such as "Catholic", "Convent", "Advent" and "Methodist".

By the 1960s, the government no longer charged fees at primary schools with a Malay-language medium; fees for Malay-medium primary schools were abolished by the Education Act of 1961 and "abolished with affect" by 1966. The missionary schools providing a curriculum in the English-language medium continued to charge fees which were "regulated by the government". By the 1980s, missionary schools were offering a curriculum – primary and secondary – in the Malay-language medium and thus no longer required to charge fees. However, donations from these school's alumni and their families are still paid today.

During the 1970s, in accordance to the national language policy, the government began to change these English-medium primary and secondary national-type schools – missionary schools – into Malay-medium national schools. The language change was made gradually starting from the first year in primary school, then the second year in the following year and so on. The change was completed by the end of 1982.

At this period, the "mission school authorities baulked" at the government's request that they "surrender" their schools – land and buildings – to the government to be converted into fully aided national schools. Today, the various religious denominations still retain ownership of the "land and school buildings" of their missionary schools with the schools themselves operating as "only grant-in-aid national schools". They are not "fully aided" government schools. The church groups receive a "token monthly rent" from the government. The closure of a missionary school results in the "plots of land" being returned by the Education Ministry to their "owners" – the religious groups.

In 2017, a number of "mission school educationists" had reportedly re-established their schools as "private with a local curriculum" stating that the schools had "long histories as private mission schools". The report stated that "St John’s International School is now a private-funded education centre in collaboration with the La Salle Brothers Malaysia. It has links with the Lasallian organisation which has had a footing in Malaysia since 1904, with premier St. John's Institution as a mission school, and also in more than 70 countries". The Sisters of the Holy Infant Jesus are also considering such re-structuring for their schools saying that they have "no intention to sell their land and buildings for redevelopment".

== School grades ==
=== Public and private schools following the National Curriculum ===
The school year is divided into two semesters. The first semester begins in early January and ends in late May; the second semester begins in early June and ends in November.

| Level/Grade | Typical age |
Preschool
| Pre-school playgroup | 3–4 |
| Kindergarten | 4–6 |
Primary school
| Year 1 | 7 |
| Year 2 | 8 |
| Year 3 | 9 |
| Year 4 | 10 |
| Year 5 | 11 |
| Year 6 | 12 |
Secondary school
| Form 1 | 13 |
| Form 2 | 14 |
| Form 3 | 15 |
| Form 4 | 16 |
| Form 5 | 17 |
Pre-university (Sixth form college or selected secondary schools)
| Lower Form 6 | 17–18 |
| Upper Form 6 | 18–19 |
Post-secondary education
| Tertiary education (College, Polytechnic or University) | Ages vary |

=== Chinese independent high schools ===
After completing their primary education in a Chinese national-type primary school, some students may choose to attend a Chinese Independent High School for their secondary education. Education in Chinese Independent High Schools usually last for six years, divided into two stages: three years in junior middle and three years in senior middle, similar to the secondary school systems in mainland China and Taiwan, Hong Kong, and Macau. Students are streamed into tracks like Science or Art/Commerce in the senior middle stage. At the end of each stage, students sit for the Unified Examination Certificate (UEC). A few schools offer an additional year in senior middle, catering to students taking the government's Sijil PMR pendidikan menengah rendah Sijil Pelajaran Malaysia SPM (SPM) Sijil pelajaran vokasional Malaysia (SPVM) Sijil pelajaran kemahiran Malaysia (SKM)Sijil Tinggi Pelajaran Malaysia (STPM, equivalent to A-level O-Level ). Chinese independent high schools use the same academic year as government schools. An academic year consists of two semesters: Semester 1 from January to May and Semester 2 from June to November, with examinations at the end of each semester. The overall academic performance of a student in an academic year determines his/her promotion to the next study year in the next academic year. Failing requires repeating the study year. Usually, failing to be promoted for two years in a row results in a dismissal. In contrast, students in government schools are automatically promoted regardless of academic performance.

| Level/Grade | Typical age |
Secondary school
| Junior Middle 1 (Chinese: 初中一; pinyin: Chū zhōng yī) | 12–13 |
| Junior Middle 2 (Chinese: 初中二; pinyin: Chū zhōng èr) | 13–14 |
| Junior Middle 3 (Chinese: 初中三; pinyin: Chū zhōng sān) | 14–15 |
| Senior Middle 1 (Chinese: 高中一; pinyin: Gāo zhōng yī) | 15–16 |
| Senior Middle 2 (Chinese: 高中二; pinyin: Gāo zhōng èr) | 16–17 |
| Senior Middle 3 (Chinese: 高中三; pinyin: Gāo zhōng sān) | 17–18 |
Post-secondary education
| Tertiary education (College, institusi Polytechnic or University) | Ages vary |

=== International schools following international curriculums ===
There are many students who attend international schools in Malaysia. Typically, students either are enrolled in international schools from either Year 7 onwards, as the public education system for secondary school students is entirely in Bahasa Malaysia, whereas most universities and colleges conduct their lectures in the English language. Many of these parents also wish for their children to pursue an international education in the future, and entering an English-medium environment enables students to be prepared for that. International schools in Malaysia follow various curriculums, such as the Cambridge International Curriculum (UK), Australian curriculum (Western Australia), Canadian curriculum (Ontario) and the IB Curriculum (Switzerland). Many students from international schools enter university at the age of 17 due to the age arrangements.

| Level/Grade | Typical age |
Preschool
| Pre-school playgroup | 3–4 |
| Kindergarten | 4–6 |
Primary school
| Year 1 | 6–7 |
| Year 2 | 7–8 |
| Year 3 | 8–9 |
| Year 4 | 9–10 |
| Year 5 | 10–11 |
| Year 6 | 11–12 |
Secondary school
| Year 7 | 12–13 |
| Year 8 | 13–14 |
| Year 9 | 14–15 |
| Year 10 | 15–16 |
| Year 11 | 16–17 |
| Year 12 | 17–18 |
Post-secondary education
| Tertiary education (College, institusi Polytechnic or University) | Ages vary |

== Dual Language Program (DLP) ==
The Dual Language Program (DLP) is an educational initiative implemented by the Ministry of Education under the broader Policy of Enhancing the Malaysian Language and Strengthening the English Language (MBMMBI). Launched on a pilot basis in 2016 and initially involving 300 schools, the DLP offers eligible educational institutions the option to conduct teaching and learning sessions in English for specific subjects, notably Science and Mathematics, at the primary and secondary school levels.

The primary objectives of the DLP are threefold: first, to provide opportunities for students to enhance their English proficiency through the instruction of Science and Mathematics subjects; second, to expand students' access to explore various fields of knowledge, fostering competitiveness at the global level; and third, to increase the marketability of students in the workforce. The program is strategically designed to strengthen bilingualism among students, ultimately preparing them for the challenges of an increasingly interconnected and competitive world.

At the primary school level, the DLP encompasses Science and Mathematics, while at the lower secondary and upper secondary levels, it extends to additional subjects such as Additional Science, Physics, Chemistry, Biology, Additional Mathematics, and Mathematics. By offering English language instruction in key STEM (Science, Technology, Engineering, and Mathematics) disciplines, the DLP aims to equip students with the language skills necessary for success in both academic and professional domains.

=== Issues and Developments ===
Despite its strategic goals, the Dual Language Program (DLP) in Malaysia has encountered several challenges and witnessed significant developments since its inception in 2016. One notable concern has been the proficiency of students in Bahasa Melayu (BM), the national language, and their mother tongues. Field visits by the Ministry of Education revealed instances where students in DLP schools lacked a basic level of proficiency in these languages, prompting the ministry to emphasise the need for schools to ensure that all criteria, including BM mastery, are met.

Controversies have also arisen over the stringent criteria for DLP implementation. Stakeholders, including parents and school officials, have voiced concerns about the impact of these criteria, such as the recent requirement for a minimum of one full non-DLP class in schools implementing the full DLP. This has led to challenges in resource allocation and sparked debates about the practicality of such conditions, especially for schools with limited resources. Few of the schools in Malacca opposed on the forced implementation of non-DLP class, which these schools taught mathematics and science subjects fully in English language.

At the end of 2023, there were 2,420 DLP schools in Malaysia, comprising 1,613 primary schools and 807 secondary schools. In an effort to address concerns and ensure a case-by-case approach, the Ministry of Education has allowed schools to open more than one DLP class for Year One and Form One students based on readiness and assessment by relevant education offices.

== Preschool education ==
There is no fixed rules on when a child needs to start preschool education but majority would start when the child turns 3 years old. Schooling can begin earlier, from 3–6, in kindergarten. Preschool education usually lasts for 2 years, before they proceed to primary school at age 7. There is no formal preschool curriculum except a formal mandatory training and certification for principals and teachers before they may operate a preschool. The training covers lessons on child psychology, teaching methodologies, and other related curricula on childcare and development. Preschool education is not compulsory.

Preschool education is mainly provided by private for-profit preschools, though some are run by the government or religious groups. Some primary schools have attached preschool sections. Attendance in a preschool programme is not universal; while people living in urban areas are generally able to send their children to private kindergartens, few do in rural areas. Registered preschools are subjected to zoning regulations and must comply to other regulations such as health screening, fire hazard assessment and educational guidelines. Many preschools are located in high density residential areas, where normal residential units compliant to regulations are converted into the schools.

== Primary education ==
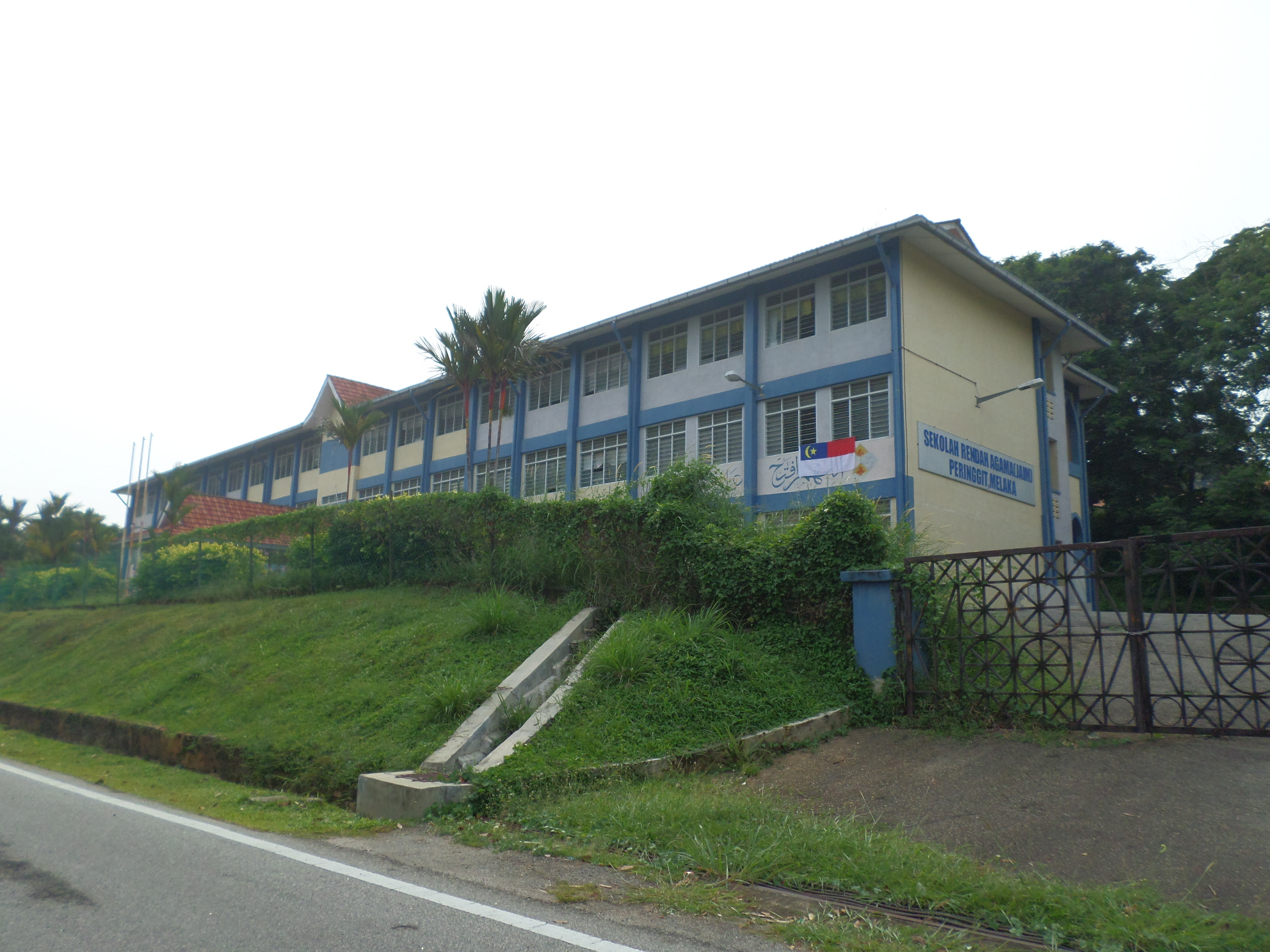
Peringgit Primary School in Malacca.

Primary education in Malaysia begins at age seven and lasts for six years, referred to as Year (Tahun) 1 to 6 (also known as Standard (Darjah) 1 to 6). Year 1 to Year 3 are classified as Lower Primary (Tahap Satu) while Year 4 to Year 6 are considered as Upper Primary (Tahap Dua). Students are promoted to the next year regardless of their academic performance. Since 2003, primary education has been made compulsory for children of Malaysian citizens.

From 1996 until 2000, the Penilaian Tahap Satu (PTS) or the Level One Evaluation was administered to Year 3 students. Excellence in this test allowed students to skip Year 4 and attend Year 5 instead. However, the test was removed from 2001 onwards due to concerns that parents and teachers were unduly pressuring students to pass the exam.

Before progressing to secondary education, Year 6 pupils used to sit for the Primary School Achievement Test (Ujian Pencapaian Sekolah Rendah, UPSR). The subjects tested were Malay comprehension, Malay writing, English comprehension, English writing, Science and Mathematics. In addition to the six subjects, Chinese comprehension (华文理解) and written Chinese (华文作文) were compulsory in Chinese schools (SJKC), while Tamil comprehension (தமிழ் கருத்துணர்தல்) and written Tamil (தமிழ் கட்டுரை) were compulsory in Tamil schools (SJKT). In 2021, the Ministry of Education cancelled the Primary School Achievement Test (Ujian Pencapaian Sekolah Rendah) for all Year 6 students. Then in 2022, the Ministry of Education decided that Year 4 to 6 students participate in the new UASA (Ujian Akhir Sesi Akademik) test. The subjects tested are : Malay, English, Science, Maths. Chinese (华文) is compulsory in Chinese schools (SJKC), while Tamil (தமிழ்) is compulsory in Tamil schools (SJKT).

Schools in Malaysia can select other subjects to be tested, but it had to be prepared by the school. For example: Reka Bentuk dan Teknologi (Robotics and Technology), Pendidikan Moral (Moral Education), Pendidikan Islam (Islamic Education), Pendidikan Seni Visual (Arts) (Year 5,6), Pendidikan Muzik (Music) (Year 5,6), Pendidikan Kesenian (Arts and Music) (Year 4) and Pendidikan Jasmani dan Pendidikan Kesihatan (P.E. and Health Education).

=== School types and medium of instruction ===
Public primary schools are divided into two categories based on the medium of instruction:

- Malay-medium National Schools (Sekolah Kebangsaan, SK)
- non-Malay-medium National-type Schools (Sekolah Jenis Kebangsaan, SJK), also known as "vernacular schools", further divided into
  - National-type School (Chinese) (Sekolah Jenis Kebangsaan (Cina), SJK(C)), Mandarin-medium and simplified Chinese writing
  - National-type School (Tamil) (Sekolah Jenis Kebangsaan (Tamil), SJK (T)), Tamil-medium

All schools admit students regardless of racial and language background.

Malay and English are compulsory subjects in all schools. All schools use the same syllabus for non-language subjects regardless of the medium of instruction. The teaching of the Chinese language is compulsory in SJK(C), and Tamil language is compulsory in SJK(T). Additionally, a National School must provide the teaching of Chinese or Tamil language, as well as indigenous languages wherever practical, if the parents of at least 15 pupils in the school request that the particular language be taught.

In January 2003, a mixed medium of instruction was introduced so that students would learn Science and Mathematics in English. Due to pressure from the Chinese community, SJK(C) teach Science and Mathematics in both English and Chinese. Later, the government reversed the policy of teaching Science and Mathematics in English in July 2009, and previous languages of instruction will be reintroduced in stages from 2012. However, the Ministry has since launched the Dual Language Program (DLP) to cater the language issue.

By degree of government funding, National Schools are government-owned and operated, while National-type Schools are mostly government-aided, though some are government-owned. In government-aided National-type Schools, the government is responsible for funding the school operations, teachers' training and salary, and setting the school curriculum, while the school buildings and assets belong to the local ethnic communities, which elect a board of directors for each school to safeguard the school properties. Between 1995 and 2000, the Seventh Malaysia Plan allocation for primary education development allocated 96.5% to National Schools which had 75% of total enrolment. Chinese National-type Schools (21% enrolment) received 2.4% of the allocation while Tamil National-type Schools (3.6% enrolment) received 1% of the allocation.

Previously, there were also other types of National-type Schools. The English National-type Schools were assimilated to become National Schools as a result of decolonisation. Others, such as those for Telugu and Punjabi were closed due to the dwindling number of students and assimilation to Tamil dominance. The role of promoting these two languages and culture are currently fulfilled by some Gurdwaras (Sikh temples) and Telugu based organisations.

The division of public education at the primary level into National and National-type Schools has been criticised for allegedly creating racial polarisation at an early age. To address the problem, attempts have been made to establish Sekolah Wawasan ("vision schools"). Under the concept, three schools (typically one SK, one SJK(C) and one SJK(T)) would share the same school compound and facilities while maintaining different school administrations, ostensibly to encourage closer interaction. However, this was met with objections from most of the Chinese and Indian communities as they believe this will restrict the use of their mother tongue in schools.

== Secondary education ==
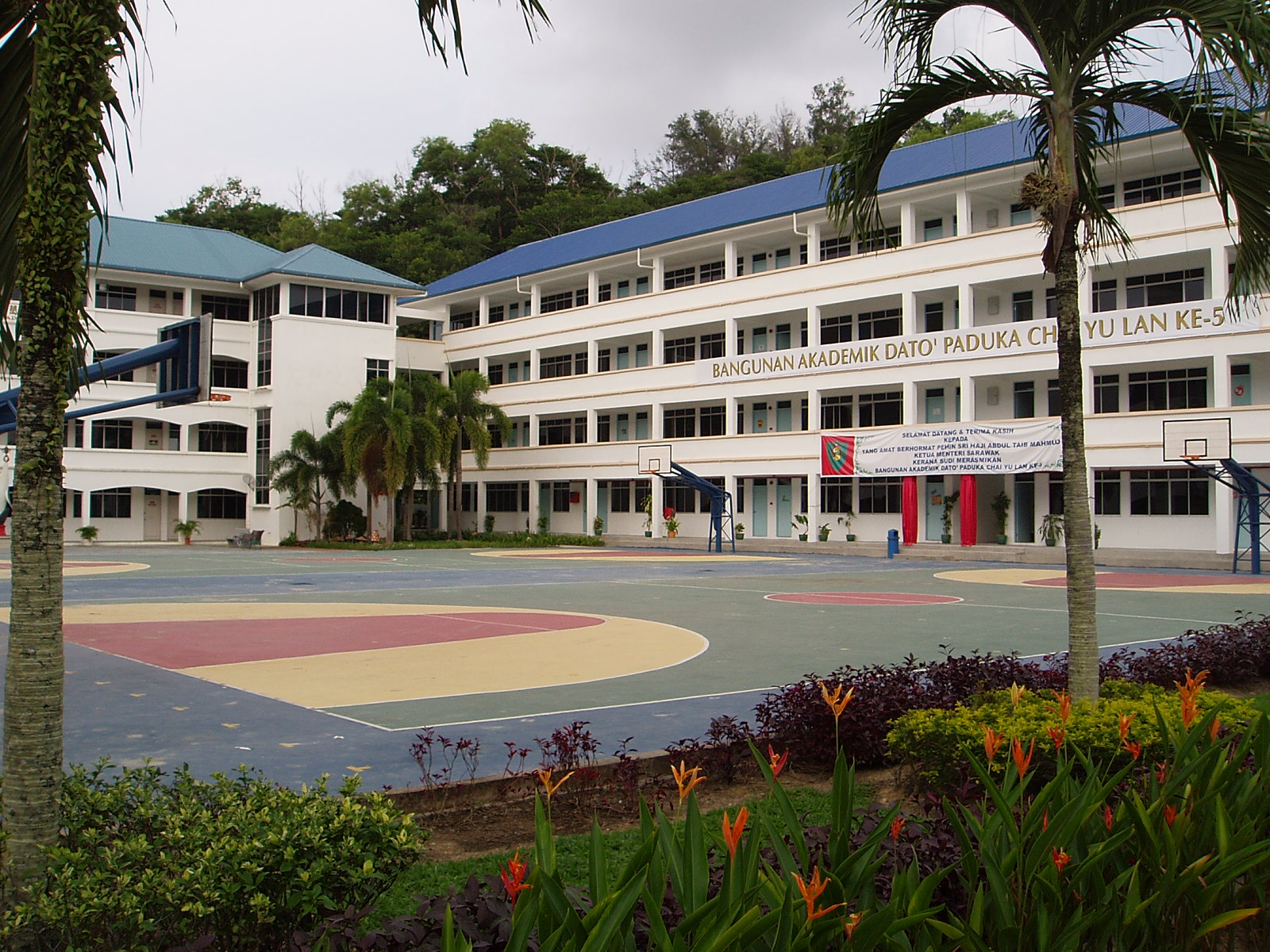
Chung Hua Secondary School, Miri, Sarawak

Public secondary education in Malaysia is provided by National Secondary Schools (Sekolah Menengah Kebangsaan, SMK). National Secondary Schools use Malay as the main medium of instruction because Malay language is the National language of Malaysia while English is a compulsory subject in all schools. Since 2003, Science and Mathematics had been taught in English, however in 2009 the government decided to revert to use Malay starting in year 2012. However, the Ministry has since launched the Dual Language Program (DLP) to cater the language issue. Secondary education is currently not compulsory in Malaysia, but there has been plan to make it compulsory since 2024, and the relevant amendment bill has been tabled in July 2025.

As in primary schools, a National Secondary School must provide teaching of Chinese and Tamil languages, as well as indigenous languages wherever practical, on request of parents of at least 15 pupils in the school. In addition, foreign languages such as Arabic or Japanese may be taught at certain schools.

Secondary education lasts for five years, referred to as Form (Tingkatan) 1 to 5. Form 1 to Form 3 are known as Lower Form (Menengah Rendah), while Form 4 and 5 are known as Upper Form (Menengah Atas). Most students who had completed primary education are admitted to Form 1. Students from national-type primary schools have the additional requirement to obtain a minimum D grade for the Malay subjects at the end of Primary school, failing which they will have to attend a year-long transition class, commonly called "Remove" (Kelas/Tingkatan Peralihan), before proceeding to Form 1. As in primary schools, students are promoted to the next year regardless of their academic performance.

Co-curricular activities are compulsory at the secondary level, where all students must participate in at least 2 activities for most states, and 3 activities for the Sarawak region. There are many co-curricular activities offered at the secondary level, varying at each school and each student is judged based in these areas. Competitions and performances are regularly organised. Co-curricular activities are often categorised under the following: Uniformed Groups, Performing Arts, Clubs & Societies, Sports & Games. Student may also participate in more than 2 co-curricular activities.

Before progressing to Upper Form, Form 3 students are required to sit for their final exam — Ujian Akhir Sesi Akademik Tingkatan 3 (UASA). Their result, performance and interest will determine the streams they will get during Upper Form. Other than that, student performance is also determined by Pentaksiran Berasaskan Sekolah (PBS), the school-based assessment. Previously, the Pentaksiran Tingkatan 3 (PT3) or Form Three Assessment was taken by students until the government abolished the exam in 2022.

At the end of Form 5, students are required to take the Sijil Pelajaran Malaysia (SPM) or Malaysian Certificate of Education examination, before graduating from secondary school. The SPM was based on the old British School Certificate examination before it became General Certificate of Education O Levels examination, which became the GCSE (General Certificate of Secondary Education). As of 2006, students are given a GCE 'O' Level grade for their English paper in addition to the normal English SPM paper. (Previously, this was reported on result slips as a separate result labelled 1119, which meant students received two grades for their English papers.) This separate grade is given based on the marks of the essay-writing component of the English paper. The essay section of the English paper is remarked under the supervision of officials from the British O Levels examination. Although not part of their final certificates, the O Level grade is included on their results slip.

Shortly after the release of the 2005 SPM results in March 2006, the Education Ministry announced it was considering reforming the SPM system due to what was perceived as over-emphasis on As. Local educators appeared responsive to the suggestion, with one professor at the University of Malaya deploring university students who could not write letters, debate, or understand footnoting. He complained that "They don't understand what I am saying. I cannot communicate with them." He claimed that "Before 1957 (the year of independence), school heroes were not those with 8As or 9As, they were the great debaters, those good in drama, in sport, and those leading the Scouts and Girl Guides." A former Education Director-General, Murad Mohd Noor, agreed, saying that "The rat race now begins at Standard 6 with the UPSR, with the competition resulting in parents forcing their children to attend private tuition." He also expressed dismay at the prevalence of students taking 15 or 16 subjects for the SPM, calling it "unnecessary".

A subset of the public secondary schools are known as National-type Chinese secondary school (Sekolah Menengah Jenis Kebangsaan, SMJK, 国民型华文中学, 华中). In 1956, Chung Ling High School in Penang became the first Chinese school to accept government subsidies, making it the first public school under the British colonial government. As a result, a breakaway private school, Chung Ling Private High School, was founded in 1962. At Malayan Independence (1957), it was decided that secondary education would be provided in Malay-medium National Secondary Schools and English-medium National-type Secondary Schools. Fee paying, English-medium schools owned and administered by missionaries/religious bodies were offered government aid provided that they adopted the national curriculum. Secondary schools using other languages as medium of instruction, most of them Chinese schools, were offered government aid on the condition that they convert into English-medium schools. In the 1970s, as the government began to abolish English-medium education in public schools, all National-type Secondary School were gradually converted into Malay-medium schools. The term "National-type Secondary School" is not present in the Education Act of 1996, which blurred the distinction between SMK and SMJK.

However, Chinese educational groups are unwelcoming of the new development and continue to push for the distinction to be made between the 81 formerly Chinese-medium schools and other secondary schools. The schools continue to have "SMJK" on the school signboards and boards of directors continue to manage the school properties, as opposed to schools that are directly managed by the government. Most former Chinese-medium SMJK continue to have a majority Chinese student and teacher population, usually only accept students from Chinese-medium primary schools, have Chinese language (Bahasa Cina 华文) as a compulsory subject and have bilingual (Malay and Chinese) school announcements.

Other types of government or government-aided secondary schools include Religious Secondary School (Sekolah Menengah Agama), Technical Schools (Sekolah Menengah Teknik), Fully Residential Schools and MARA Junior Science College (Maktab Rendah Sains MARA).

Within the national public school system are a few magnet type/charter public high schools. Admissions are very selective, reserved for students who demonstrate outstanding academic achievement and potential at the elementary level, Year/Standard 1 through 6. These schools are either full-time day or boarding schools ('asrama penuh'). Examples of these schools are Sekolah Tuanku Abdul Rahman, Royal Military College (Malaysia) and Penang Free School.

Residential schools or Sekolah Berasrama Penuh are also known as Science Schools. These schools used to cater mainly for Malay elites but have since expanded as schools for nurturing Malays who are outstanding academically or those displaying talents in sports and leadership. The schools are modelled after British Boarding School.

== Post-secondary education (pre-university) ==
After the SPM, students from public secondary school would have a choice of either studying Form 6 or the matriculation (pre-university). If they are accepted to continue studying in Form 6, they will also take the Sijil Tinggi Persekolahan Malaysia (which is usually abbreviated as STPM) or Malaysian Higher School Certificate examination (its British equivalent is the General Certificate of Education A Level examination or internationally, the Higher School Certificate). STPM is regulated by the Malaysian Examinations Council. Although it is generally taken by those desiring to attend public universities in Malaysia, it is internationally recognised and may also be used, though rarely required, to enter private local universities for undergraduate courses.

Additionally all students may apply for admission to matriculation. This matriculation is a one or two-year programme run by the Ministry of Education. Previously, it was a one-year programme, but beginning 2006, 30% of all matriculation students were offered two-year programmes.

Not all applicants for matriculation are admitted and the selection criteria are not publicly declared, which has led to speculation that any criteria existing may not be adhered to. A race-based quota is applied on the admission process, with 90% of the places being reserved for the Bumiputeras, and the other 10% for the non-Bumiputeras.

Having been introduced after the abolishment of a racial-quota-based admission into universities, the matriculation programme continues the role of its predecessor, albeit in modified form. The matriculation programme adopts a semester basis examination (two semesters in a year). Similarly, STPM involves three-term examinations (one final examination every term), two resit examinations at the end of the final term (if desired by students), as well as coursework depending on each subject (except for General Studies where coursework is mandatory) covering all one and a half years' syllabus.

The Centre for Foundation Studies in Science, University of Malaya, offers two programmes only for Bumiputera students: i) The Science Program, a one-year course under the Department of Higher Education, Ministry of Higher Education. After completing the program, the students are placed into various science-based courses in local universities through the meritocracy system. ii) The Special Preparatory Program to Enter the Japanese Universities, a two-year intensive programme under the Look East Policy Division of the Public Service Department of Malaysia in co-operation with the Japanese Government.

Some students undertake their pre-university studies in private colleges. They may opt for programmes such as the British A Level programme, the Canadian matriculation programme or the equivalent of other national systems – namely the Australian NSW Board of Studies Higher School Certificate and the American High School Diploma with AP subjects. More recently, the International Baccalaureate Diploma Programme is becoming more popular as a pre-university option.

The Government has claimed that admission to universities are purely meritocracy based and do not have plans to change the system.

== Tertiary education ==
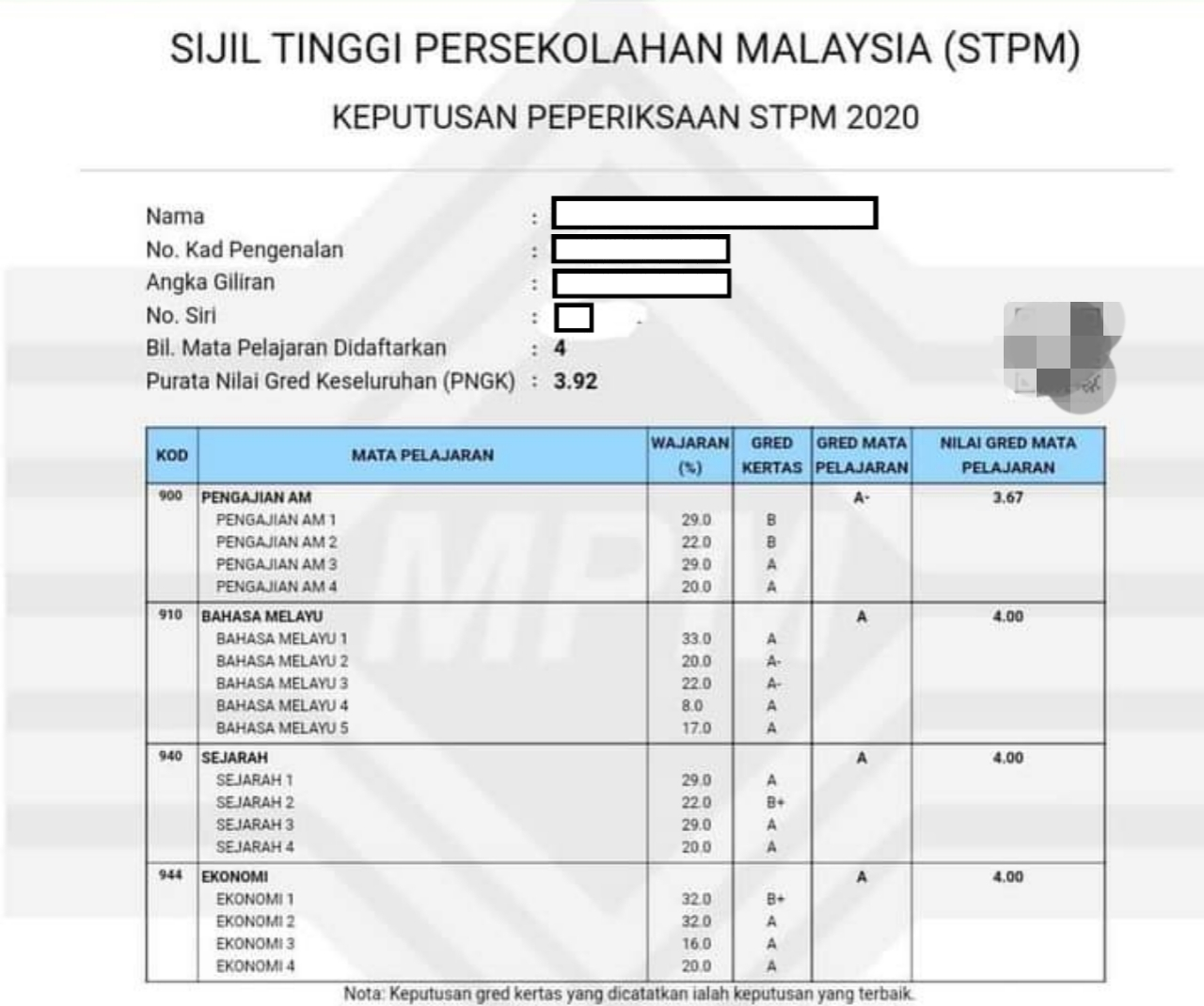
STPM examination results slip

Tertiary education is heavily subsidised by the government. The first university created in Malaysia is University Malaya, established once as the King Edward VII College of Medicine in 1905.

Before the introduction of the matriculation system, students aiming to enter public universities had to complete an additional 18 months of secondary schooling in Form 6 and sit the Malaysian Higher School Certificate (Sijil Tinggi Persekolahan Malaysia, STPM); equivalent to the British Advanced or A Level.

Since the introduction of the matriculation programme as an alternative to STPM in 1999, students who completed the 12-month programme in matriculation colleges (kolej matrikulasi) can enrol in local universities. However, in the matriculation system, only 10% of the places are open to non-Bumiputra students. Excellence in these examinations does not guarantee a place in a public university. The selection criteria are largely opaque as no strictly enforced defined guidelines exist.

The classification of tertiary education in Malaysia is organised upon the Malaysian Qualifications Framework (MQF) which seeks to set up a unified system of post secondary qualifications offered on a national basis in the vocational and higher education sectors.

From 2004 to 2013, the government formed the Ministry of Higher Education to oversee tertiary education in Malaysia.

The government announced a reduction of reliance of racial quotas in 2002, instead leaning more towards meritocracy. Before 2004, all lecturers in public tertiary institutions were required to have some post-graduate award as a qualification. In October 2004, this requirement was removed and the Higher Education Ministry announced that industry professionals who added value to a course could apply for lecturing positions directly to universities even if they did not have postgraduate qualifications. To head off possible allegations that the universities faced a shortage of lecturers, Deputy Higher Education Minister Datuk Fu Ah Kiow said "This is not because we are facing a shortage of lecturers, but because this move will add value to our courses and enhance the name of our universities. Let's say Bill Gates and Steven Spielberg, both [undergraduates but] well known and outstanding in their fields, want to be teaching professors. Of course, we would be more than happy to take them in." He went on to offer as an example the field of architecture whereby well-known architects recognised for their talents do not have master's degrees.

There are 20 public universities established in Malaysia with each have differences specialization. The universities is separated into several types, such as Research based (University Malaya, Universiti Kebangsaan Malaysia, Universiti Sains Malaysia, University Putra Malaysia and University of Technology Malaysia). There is also TVET based such as Malaysian Technical University Network, focused university (such as Sultan Idris Education University) and comprehensive university (such as Universiti Malaysia Sarawak, Universiti Malaysia Sabah). Islamic university such as International Islamic University Malaysia is established under OIC funding. Universiti Teknologi MARA is established to assist rural Malays.

Students have the option of enrolling in private tertiary institutions after secondary studies. Private universities are gaining a reputation for international quality education and students from all over the world attend them. Many of these institutions offer courses in co-operation with a foreign institute or university – especially in the United States, the United Kingdom and Australia – allowing students to spend a portion of their course abroad as well as getting overseas qualifications. One such example is Universiti Tunku Abdul Rahman which partnered with National Taiwan University, National Yang Ming Chiao Tung University, Regensburg University of Applied Sciences and Tunghai University.

Many private colleges offer programmes whereby the student does part of his degree course here and part of it in the other institution; this is called "twinning". The nature of these programs is diverse and ranges from the full "twinning" program where all credits and transcripts are transferable and admission is automatic to programs where the local institution offers an "associate degree" which is accepted at the discretion of the partnering university. In the latter case, acceptance of transcripts and credits is at the discretion of the partner. Some of them are branch campuses of these foreign institutions. In addition, four reputable international universities have set up their branch campuses in Malaysia since 1998. A branch can be seen as an 'offshore campus' of the foreign university, which offers the same courses and awards as the main campus. Local and international students can acquire these identical foreign qualifications in Malaysia at a lower fee.

Some of the foreign university branch campuses in Malaysia are:

- University of Nottingham Malaysia Campus
- Monash University Malaysia Campus
- Curtin University, Malaysia
- Swinburne University of Technology Sarawak Campus
- Newcastle University Medicine Malaysia (NUMed)
- University of Southampton Malaysia Campus
- Heriot-Watt University Malaysia
- University of Reading Malaysia
- Xiamen University Malaysia
- Royal College of Surgeons in Ireland and University College Dublin Malaysia Campus
- University of Tsukuba Malaysia Campus

Others are

- SAE Institute, Australia
- Raffles Design Institute, Singapore

The net outflow of academics from Malaysia led to a "brain gain" scheme by then (1995) Prime Minister Tun Dr Mahathir Mohamad. The scheme set a target of attracting 5,000 talents annually. In 2004, Science, Technology and Innovation Minister, Datuk Dr Jamaluddin Jarjis in a parliamentary reply stated that the scheme attracted 94 scientists (24 Malaysians) in pharmacology, medicine, semi-conductor technology and engineering from abroad between 1995 and 2000. At the time of his reply, only one was remaining in Malaysia.

=== Postgraduate programmes ===
Postgraduate degrees such as the Master of Business Administration (MBA) and the Doctor of Business Administration (DBA) are becoming popular and are offered by public and private universities.

All public and most private universities in Malaysia offer Master of Science degrees either through coursework or research and Doctor of Philosophy degrees through research.

=== Polytechnics ===
Polytechnics in Malaysia provide courses for bachelor's degree, Advanced Diploma, Diploma and Special Skills Certificate.

The following is a list of the polytechnics in Malaysia in order of establishment:

| Official name in Malay | Acronym | Foundation | Type | Location | Link |
|---|---|---|---|---|---|
| Politeknik Ungku Omar | PUO | 1969 | Premier Polytechnic (University Status) | Ipoh, Perak | |
| Politeknik Sultan Haji Ahmad Shah | POLISAS | 1976 | Conventional Polytechnic | Kuantan, Pahang | |
| Politeknik Sultan Abdul Halim Muadzam Shah | POLIMAS | 1984 | Conventional Polytechnic | Bandar Darul Aman, Jitra, Kedah | |
| Politeknik Kota Bharu | PKB | 1985 | Conventional Polytechnic | Ketereh, Kelantan | |
| Politeknik Kuching Sarawak | PKS | 1987 | Conventional Polytechnic | Kuching, Sarawak | |
| Politeknik Port Dickson | PPD | 1990 | Conventional Polytechnic | Si Rusa, Port Dickson, Negeri Sembilan | |
| Politeknik Kota Kinabalu | PKK | 1996 | Conventional Polytechnic | Manggatal, Kota Kinabalu, Sabah | |
| Politeknik Sultan Salahuddin Abdul Aziz Shah | PSA | 1997 | Premier Polytechnic (University Status) | Shah Alam, Selangor | |
| Politeknik Ibrahim Sultan | PIS | 1998 | Premier Polytechnic (University Status) | Pasir Gudang, Johor | |
| Politeknik Seberang Perai | PSP | 1998 | Conventional Polytechnic | Permatang Pauh, Pulau Pinang | |
| Politeknik Melaka | PMK | 1999 | Conventional Polytechnic | Balai Panjang, Malacca Town, Malacca | |
| Politeknik Kuala Terengganu | PKKT | 1999 | Conventional Polytechnic | Kuala Terengganu, Terengganu | |
| Politeknik Sultan Mizan Zainal Abidin | PSMZA | 2001 | Conventional Polytechnic | Dungun, Terengganu | |
| Politeknik Merlimau | PMM | 2002 | Conventional Polytechnic | Merlimau, Malacca | |
| Politeknik Sultan Azlan Shah | PSAS | 2002 | Conventional Polytechnic | Behrang, Perak | |
| Politeknik Tuanku Sultanah Bahiyah | PTSB | 2002 | Conventional Polytechnic | Kulim, Kedah | |
| Politeknik Sultan Idris Shah | PSIS | 2003 | Conventional Polytechnic | Sungai Air Tawar, Sabak Bernam, Selangor | |
| Politeknik Tuanku Syed Sirajuddin | PTSS | 2003 | Conventional Polytechnic | Ulu Pauh, Perlis | |
| Politeknik Muadzam Shah | PMS | 2003 | Conventional Polytechnic | Bandar Muadzam Shah, Rompin, Pahang | |
| Politeknik Mukah Sarawak | PMU | 2004 | Conventional Polytechnic | Mukah, Sarawak | |
| Politeknik Balik Pulau | PBU | 2007 | Conventional Polytechnic | Balik Pulau, Pulau Pinang | |
| Politeknik Jeli | PJK | 2007 | Conventional Polytechnic | Jeli, Kelantan | |
| Politeknik Nilai | PNS | 2007 | Conventional Polytechnic | Nilai, Negeri Sembilan | |
| Politeknik Banting | PBS | 2007 | Conventional Polytechnic | Kuala Langat, Selangor | |
| Politeknik Mersing | PMJ | 2008 | Conventional Polytechnic | Mersing, Johor | |
| Politeknik Hulu Terengganu | PHT | 2008 | Conventional Polytechnic | Kuala Berang, Terengganu | |
| Politeknik Sandakan | PSS | 2009 | Conventional Polytechnic | Sandakan, Sabah | |
| Politeknik METrO Kuala Lumpur | PMKL | 2011 | METrO Polytechnic | Setiawangsa, Kuala Lumpur | |
| Politeknik METrO Kuantan | PMKU | 2011 | METrO Polytechnic | Kuantan, Pahang | |
| Politeknik METrO Johor Bahru | PMJB | 2011 | METrO Polytechnic | Johor Bahru, Johor | |
| Politeknik METrO Betong | PMBS | 2012 | METrO Polytechnic | Betong, Sarawak | |
| Politeknik METrO Tasek Gelugor | PMTG | 2012 | METrO Polytechnic | Butterworth, Pulau Pinang | |
| Politeknik Tun Syed Nasir Syed Ismail | PTSN | 2013 | Conventional Polytechnic | Muar, Johor | |

== Other types of schools ==
Apart from national schools, there are other types of schools in Malaysia.

=== Islamic religious schools ===
A system of Islamic religious schools exists in Malaysia. Primary schools are called Sekolah Rendah Agama (SRA), while secondary schools are called Sekolah Menengah Kebangsaan Agama (SMKA). Another group of religious schools are Sekolah Agama Bantuan Kerajaan (SABK). SABK includes secondary schools and may also include a type of primary schools called community religious schools or sekolah agama rakyat (SAR).

The SAR schools teach Muslim students subjects related to Islam such as early Islamic history, Arabic language and Fiqh. It is not compulsory though some states such as Johor make it mandatory for all Muslim children aged six to twelve to attend the schools as a complement to the mandatory primary education. In the final year, students will sit an examination for graduation. Most SAR are funded by respective states and managed by states' religious authority. Previously, former Prime Minister Tun Dr. Mahathir Mohammad suggested to the government that the SARs should be closed down and integrated into the national schools. However, his proposal was met with resistance and later, the matter was left to die quietly. Such schools still exist in Malaysia, but are generally no longer the only part of a child's education in urban areas. Students in rural parts of the country do still attend these schools. Some of the academic results published by these schools are accepted by mainline universities by taking Malaysia High Certificate of Religious Study (Sijil Tinggi Agama Malaysia, abbreviated as STAM), and many of these students continue their education in locations such as Pakistan or Egypt. Some of their alumni include Nik Adli (son of PAS spiritual leader Nik Aziz). SAR may become part of SABK formed in 2005.

Some parents also opt to send their children for religious classes after secular classes. Sunday schools and after school classes at the mosque are various options available. In many normal schools, there are also religious classes called Kelas Aliran Agama.

=== Chinese independent high schools ===
After receiving primary education in national-type primary schools, some students from SJK(C) may choose to study in a Chinese independent high school (Chinese: 華文獨立中學). Chinese independent high schools are funded by the Malaysian Chinese public, with UCSCAM (United Chinese School Committees' Association of Malaysia, also known as Dong Zong after its Chinese acronym) as the overall co-ordination body. Students in Chinese independent high schools study in three junior middle levels and three senior middle levels; each level takes one year. Like the students in public secondary schools, students in Chinese independent high schools are put into several streams like Science or Art/Commerce in the senior middle levels. However, some schools recently provided unique streams like Electrical Engineering, Food and Beverage Studies or Arts Design. The medium of instruction in Chinese independent high schools is Mandarin and uses simplified Chinese characters in writing.

Students in Chinese independent high schools take standardised tests known as the Unified Examination Certificate (UEC) at the end of Junior Middle 3 and Senior Middle 3. UEC has been run by UCSCAM since 1975 and has won ISO9001 certification from Malaysia, China, UK, Japan and so on. The UEC is available in three levels: Vocational Unified Exam (UEC-V), UEC Junior Middle Level (UEC-JML/JUEC) and Senior Middle Level (UEC-SML/SUEC). The syllabus and examinations for the UEC-V and UEC-JML are only available in the Chinese language. The UEC-SML has questions for mathematics, sciences (biology, chemistry and physics), bookkeeping, accounting and commerce in both Chinese and English.

The government of Malaysia does not recognise the UEC-SML currently, hence the UEC holders are not accepted into public universities in Malaysia. UEC-SML is however, accepted by most private universities and colleges in Malaysia. In addition, UEC-SML is recognised as an entrance qualification in many tertiary educational institutions internationally, including those in The United States, the United Kingdom, Taiwan, Japan, Mainland China, Hong Kong, Singapore, Australia and some European countries.

After the General Election 2018 in Malaysia, the incoming Pakatan Harapan government had promised for UEC to be recognised for entrance into public universities and civil service in Malaysia. It is a matter that is still under consideration and has not been implemented.

==== Dong Jiao Zong's policy ====
===== A "rooted" Chinese =====
According to the UCSCAM, it was the British colonial policy (1786–1957) to allow vernacular language schools to exist and develop, along with Sekolah Pondok (Malays) and Sekolah Tamil (Indians). This was part of the British strategy of "dividing and rule". For those who are willing to attend English schools, they will gain better opportunities in employment than any other schools, sometimes at the expense of their own racial/ethnic and religious root(s). Nevertheless, the development of Chinese language education thrived due to the conformity to the divide and rule policy. Before Malaysia gained independence, the Chinese had 1300 primary schools, nearly 100 high schools, and even a tertiary institution, Nanyang University, built without the financial support of the government. The report of Dong Zong claimed that the main reason for many Chinese parents sending their children to Chinese schools was that they generally hoped their children would retain their Chinese identity, with love and awareness of the nation of Malaysia, love of their own culture and traditions, ethnic pride, and most importantly being aware of their ethnic roots.

Lim Lian Geok (林連玉), known as the "Soul of the Malaysian Chinese" (Chinese: 族魂), the former president of UCSCAM regarded cultural right as of utmost importance since culture is the soul of every ethnicity, deserving the most respect among all of the rights. He said: "One’s culture is the soul of one’s nation, and its value as important to us as our lives.", "We, Chinese become Malayan nationals on the condition that we do our duty and loyalty to this country, not on the condition that we abandon our mother tongue and destroy our culture.", "Malayan was a virgin land, it gain the prosperous of today under the efforts of all nations." and "In ethnically diverse nations, harmony, friendship, peace and cooperation are important principles, but all must be based on equality."

==== "Final goal" ====
The UCSCAM believed that the government of Malaysia had a "final goal" (referring to the Razak Report) to eradicate the Chinese schools and Tamil schools. The report claimed that the government of Malaysia's culture and language education policy, over the past 50 years was, to not give up implementation of the "final goal": a final "national school" with the Malay language (National language) as the main medium of instruction. The language of other ethnic groups, namely Chinese and Tamil, thus could only serve as a foreign language. The reason given by the government was that the Chinese and Tamil primary schools were the root cause of disunity of this country. To achieve "national unity", all other non-national schools should be restricted, and finally merged with the national school.

==== "Do not give up and do not compromise" ====
The standpoint of UCSCAM is that only the implementation of a multilingual school policy befits Malaysia's multi-ethnic, multi-cultural, multi-linguistic and multi-religious society. Dong Jiao Zong's distinctive position for this protest has remained unchanged over the last 50 years.

=== International Schools ===
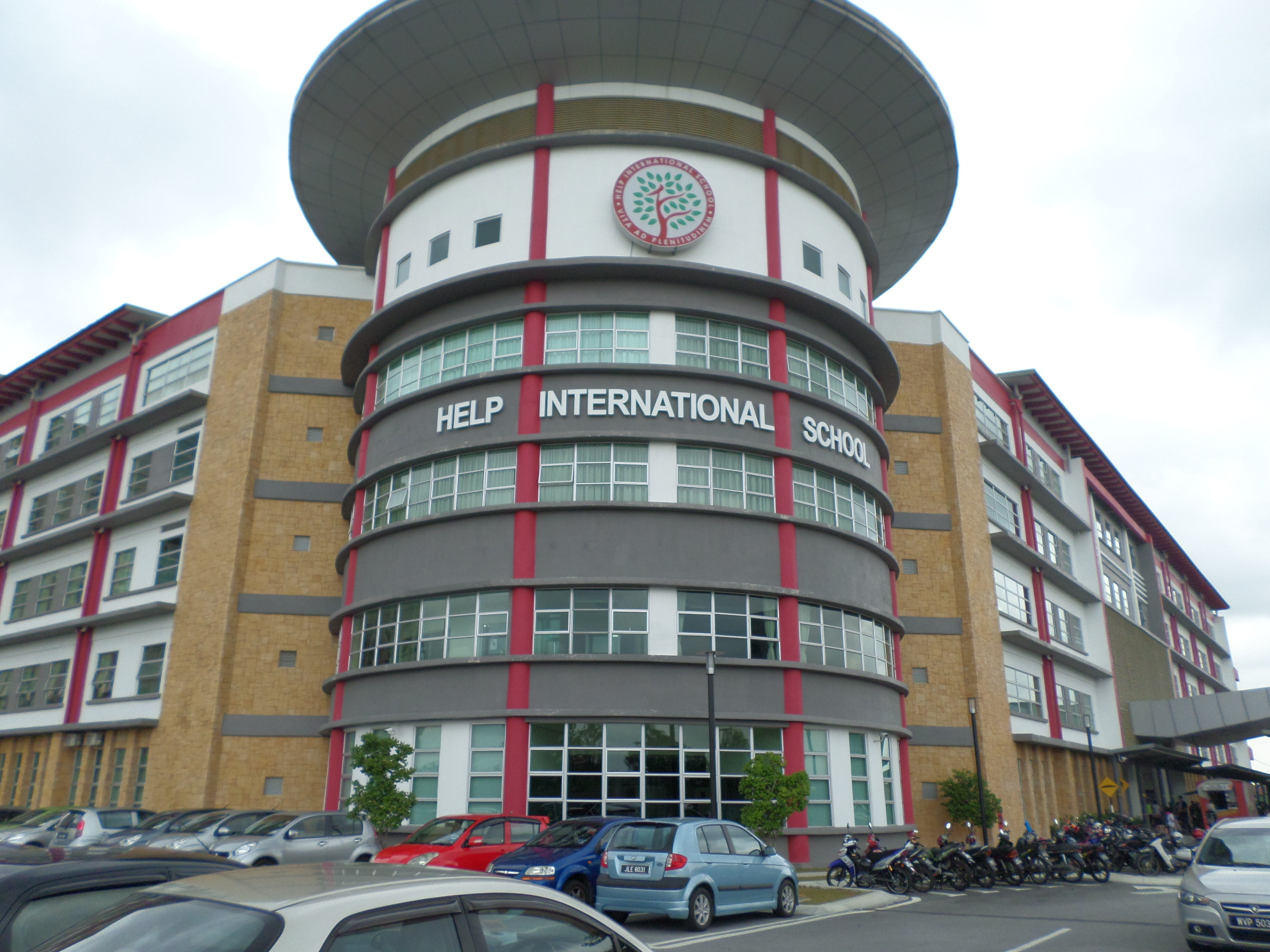
HELP International School in Selangor.

International schools use curricula of foreign countries or international curricula such as International Baccalaureate, Edexcel or Cambridge International Examinations. See Template:International schools in Malaysia for a listing.

== School uniforms ==
Present-day Malaysia introduced Western-style school uniforms (pakaian seragam sekolah) in the late 19th century during the British colonial era. Today, school uniforms are almost universal in the public and private school systems.

A common version of the Malaysian school uniform is of public schools. The dress code for males is the most standardised while female uniforms are more varied based on the religion of students and the type of schools. Male students are required to wear a collared shirt with a pair of shorts or long pants. Female students may wear a knee-length pinafore and a collared shirt, a knee-length skirt and a collared shirt, or a baju kurung consisting of a top and a long skirt with an optional hijab (tudung) for Muslim students. White socks and shoes of black or white are almost universally required for students, while ties are included in certain dress codes. Prefects, Form Six students (varies in some schools) and students with other additional school duties may wear uniforms of different colours; colours may differ between primary and secondary schools.

Starting March 2024, students are no longer be required to wear school uniforms throughout the week. Instead, it is two days of school uniform, two days of sportswear, and one day of co-curriculum attire. This decision by the Ministry of Education came after a deliberate study on issues like weather, floods, and convenience of parents, teachers, and students.

== Education policy ==
Education in Malaysia is monitored by the federal government Ministry of Education. In July 2006, Higher Education Deputy Minister Datuk Ong Tee Keat stated that a review of the controversial Universities and University Colleges Act 1971 will be held among Malaysian MPs. The ruling political alliance is composed of ethnically based parties and one of the concessions allowed by the controlling Malay party is to allow the Chinese and Indian parties to start colleges.

=== National Education Blueprint 2006–2010 ===
In 2006, the National Education Blueprint 2006–10 was released. The Blueprint set a number of goals, such as establishing a National Pre-School Curriculum, setting up 100 new classes for students with special needs, increasing the percentage of single-session schools to 90% for primary schools and 70% for secondary schools, and decreasing class sizes from 31 to 30 students in primary schools and from 32 to 30 in secondary schools by the year 2010. The Blueprint also provided a number of statistics concerning weaknesses in education. According to the Blueprint, 10% of primary schools and 1.4% of secondary schools do not have a 24-hour electricity supply, 20% and 3.4% respectively do not have a public water supply, and 78% and 42% are over 30 years old and require refurbishing. It was also stated that 4.4% of primary students and 0.8% of secondary students had not mastered the "3Ms" (reading, writing and arithmetic). The drop-out rate for secondary schools was given as 9.3% in urban areas and 16.7% in rural areas.

The Blueprint also aimed to address the problem of racial polarisation in schools. Under the Blueprint, schools will hold seminars on the Constitution of Malaysia, motivational camps to increase cultural awareness, food festivals to highlight different ethnic cooking styles, and essay competitions on different cultural traditions. Mandarin and Tamil language classes will be held in national schools, beginning with a pilot project in 220 schools in 2007.

The Blueprint has been subject to some criticism. Academic Khoo Kay Kim has criticised the plan, saying:

We do not need this blueprint to produce excellent students. What we need is a revival of the old education system. meaning the education system we had before 1957. That was when we saw dedication from the teachers. The Malaysian education system then was second to none in Asia. We did not have sports schools but we produced citizens who were Asian class, if not world class.

=== National Education Blueprint 2013–2025 ===
In 2013, the National Education Blueprint was released. It covers the education of Malaysian starting from Preschool until Post-Secondary.The approach of the blueprint was ground-breaking as it uses multiple perspectives to evaluate and assess the performance of Malaysia's education system. This included the World Bank, the United Nations Educational, Scientific, and Cultural Organisation (UNESCO), the Organisation for Economic Co-operation and Development (OECD), and six local universities. The Ministries also worked with other governmental agencies to ensure alignment with other policies related to education. Furthermore, the Ministry engaged also with the people in a new scale; Over 55000 Ministry officials, teachers, school leaders, parents, students, and members of public across Malaysia via interviews, focus groups, surveys, National Dialogue town halls, Open Days and round table discussions. More than 200 memorandums and 3000 articles and blog post were submitted by the Ministry.

The blueprint highlights aspirations to ensure universal access and full enrolment of all children from preschool through to upper secondary school level by 2020; aspirations for Malaysia to be in the top third of countries in terms of performance in international assessments, as measured by outcomes in the Trends in International Mathematics and Science Study (TIMSS) and the Programme for International Student Assessment (PISA) within 15 years, aspires to halve the current urban-rural, socio-economic and gender achievement gaps by 2020; aspirations to create a system whereby students have opportunities to build shared experiences and aspirations that form the foundation for unity, aspires to further maximise student outcomes within current budget levels.

It also has identified 11 shifts that will need to occur to deliver the step change in outcomes envisioned by Malaysians. Each shift is to address at least one of the five system outcomes of access, quality, equity, unity and efficiency. Among the many steps to be taken, it is part of the plan to increase compulsory schooling from six to 11 years, starting at the age of six years supported by targeted retention programmes, launch the Secondary School Standard Curriculum or Kurikulum Standard Sekolah Menengah (KSSM) and revised Primary School Standard Curriculum or Kurikulum Standard Sekolah Rendah (KSSR) in 2017 to embed a balanced set of knowledge and skills such as creative thinking, innovation, problem-solving and leadership, lay out clear learning standards so that students and parents understand the progress expected within each year of schooling, revamp the national examination and school-based assessments in stages, whereby by 2016 at least 40 per cent of questions in Ujian Penilaian Sekolah Rendah (UPSR) and 50 per cent in Sijil Pelajaran Malaysia (SPM) are higher-order thinking questions and by the end of 2013, is to build academic and career counselling services into the secondary school timetable to help students make better informed choices about the various education pathways on offer.

By 2025, it is to ensure that Orang Asli students, other minority groups and students with physical or learning disabilities go to schools with the facilities and equipment needed to create a conductive and supportive learning environment, from 2016, is to ensure that English is made a compulsory subject to pass for SPM, by 2025, is to ensure that every student is encouraged to learn an additional language in the move to equip them well for entering the workforce in a globalising world, will focus on building up its cadre of Chinese, Tamil and Arabic language teachers to ensure that the supply of teachers matches student demand, besides expanding the provision of other important languages such as Spanish, French and Japanese, from 2013, is to ensure that the entry bar for teachers is raised to be amongst the top 30 per cent of graduates, from 2013, is to ensure that teachers enjoy a reduced administrative burden so that they can focus the majority of their time on their core function of teaching, with some administrative functions moved to a centralised service centre or to a dedicated administrative teacher at the school level, by 2015, is to ensure that all schools meet basic infrastructure requirements, starting with Sabah and Sarawak, is to ensure that the Trust School model is expanded to 500 schools by 2025, including by alumni groups and non-governmental organisations (NGOs) as potential sponsors, will publish an annual report on the progress made against each initiative outlined in the blueprint, will undertake a stock-take at key milestones in the blueprint journey in 2015, 2020 and 2025.

== Issues in Malaysian education ==
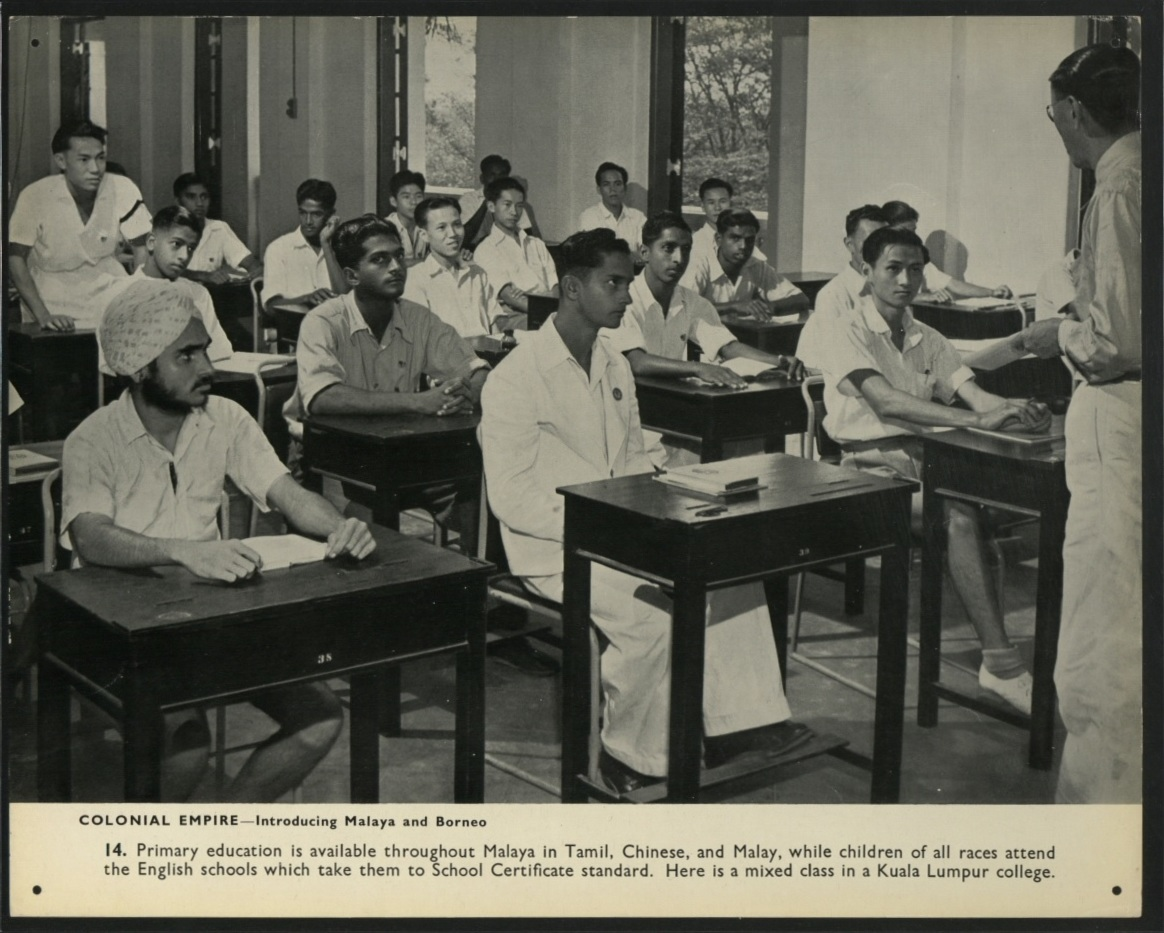
This image from the National Archives UK: "Primary education is available throughout Malaya in Tamil, Chinese, and Malay, while children of all races attend the English schools which take them to School Certificate standard. Here is a mixed class in a Kuala Lumpur college."

The history of issues in Malaysian education started since the British government period: the Barnes Report in 1951 to unite all races with the colonial language. The later Razak Report was made to replace the unsuccessful Barnes Report, and the system remains until today.

=== Language ===
The issue of language and schools is a key issue for many political groups in Malaysia. However, under the Razak Report, primary schools using the Chinese and Tamil language as medium of instruction are retained. Up until 1981 in Peninsular Malaysia (and some years later in Sabah and Sarawak), there were English-medium schools, set up by the former colonial government and Christian missionaries. Following the implementation of the 1967 National Language Act which stipulated the conversion of all English-medium schools to Malay-medium schools; as well with severe race riots in Kuala Lumpur that occurred later in May 1969, English-medium schools were phased out from January 1970; by 1982 these became Malay-medium schools ("national schools").

The existence of national-type schools is used by non-Malays components of the ruling Barisan Nasional to indicate that their culture and identity have not been infringed upon by the Malay people. Dong Jiao Zhong (the association of Chinese school boards and teachers) and other Chinese education organisations took on the role of safeguarding Chinese education in the country and are opposed to Malay replacing Chinese as medium of instruction in Chinese schools. They shape much of the views of the Chinese educated community, which is a key electoral constituency.

In 2002, the Mahathir government announced that from 2003 onwards, the teaching of Science and Mathematics would transition to English as the main medium, which was planned under a belief that Malaysia would not be left behind in a world that was rapidly globalising presumably using the language. This paved the way for the establishment of mixed-medium education. However, the policy was heavily criticised by Malay linguists and activists, fearing that the policy might erode the usage of Malay language in science and mathematics, which led to a massive rally in Kuala Lumpur on 7 March 2009. Chinese education groups opposed the policy as well, fearing that it might erode the usage of Chinese as the medium of instruction in Chinese schools. Abdullah Badawi's government announced in 2009 that this policy will be reversed in 2012: the teaching of both subjects would revert to Malay. However, the Ministry has since launched the Dual Language Program (DLP) to cater the language issue.

Due to the lack of Chinese and Indian students attending national schools, coupled with the increasing number of Malay students attending Chinese and Indian national-type schools, the government announced in April 2005 that all national schools will begin teaching Chinese and Tamil to attract more students, not as mother tongue courses but as elective courses.

=== Gender ===
In 2004 the UNDP (United Nations Development Programme) representative Dr. Richard Leete stated that Malaysia's ranking in the UNDP gender index was not "as high as it should be". Former Higher Education Minister Shafie Salleh replied that it was not unique to Malaysia. His quoted statistics revealed that there was a 2:1 ratio of boys to girls in polytechnics and at public higher learning institutions. In virtually all developed countries females and males enter university in approximately equal ratios. Thus, the 2:1 ratio in Malaysia is seen as rather peculiar when placed in a global context.

Malaysian polytechnics and community colleges are not degree-producing institutions and none have post-graduate programmes. Most are vocational or technical institutions. This imbalance is corrected once the respective genders leave the education system.

=== Racial quotas in public universities ===
In 1973, the Malaysian government implemented an affirmative action program, setting a quota of 55% of university places for Bumiputeras and the remaining 45% for Chinese and Indian students. The university quota system created considerable unhappiness among the Chinese and Indians.

In 2000, the quota for Bumiputera is raised to 90% and limited the intake of non-Bumiputera such as Indian and Chinese to 10%.

By 2008, the quota for university entrance had been abolished. Quotas in the matriculation program remained.

In 2010, the Indian community was shocked at the low 2% to 3% intake of Indian students into public universities. Indians are faring badly under the quota system used for university intake. Under the meritocratic system, about 5% to 10% of the students were Indians.

In 2019, the Minister of Education Maszlee Malik mentioned that the cabinet discussed the issue and decided to maintain the 90% quota. He also mentioned the decision to raise the amount of seats available, and that there would be some priority for the bottom 40% (B40) income group.

In 2020, it was announced that the 10% of vacancies for non-bumiputera in matriculation program would be divided into 5.43% for the Chinese, 3.72% for the Indian and 0.85% for others.

== See also ==
- Ministry of Education
- Ministry of Higher Education
- Malaysian Qualifications Agency
- Malaysian Qualifications Framework
- Department of Skills Development
- Lists of universities and colleges by country
- Early Intervention Centres in Malaysia
