= Religious education in primary and secondary education =

Religious education is the term given to education concerned with religion. It may refer to education provided by a church or religious organization, for instruction in doctrine and faith, or for education in various aspects of religion, but without explicitly religious or moral aims, e.g. in a school or college. The term is often known as religious studies.

== Egypt ==
Egypt allows students to study Christianity or Islam in public and private schools.

== England ==
Religious Education (RE) is a compulsory subject in the state education system in England, despite it not being part of the national curriculum. Schools are required to teach a programme of religious studies according to local and national guidelines.

Religious education in England is mandated by the Education Act 1944 as amended by the Education Reform Act 1988 and the School Standards and Framework Act 1998. The provision of religious education is compulsory in all state-funded schools, but it is not compulsory for any children to take the subject. The subject consists of the study of different religions, religious leaders, and other religious and moral themes. The syllabus is agreed locally by a Standing Advisory Council on Religious Education, and it may reflect the predominant place of Christianity in religious life, but also it might give an equal platform to all of the major world religions. All parents have the right to withdraw a child from religious education, which schools must approve.

Additionally, all schools are required by law to provide a daily act of collective worship, of which at least 51% must be Christian in basis over the course of the academic year. This is separate and unrelated to RE lessons. Sarah Smalley, the chair of the Association of Religious Education Inspectors, Advisors and Consultants, stated that some "schools did have problems fulfilling the requirement for worship" due to what they thought was "a lack of space to gather the entire school for worship," although Smalley noted that "there is actually no requirement for such a gathering, as smaller groups are allowed." The National Union of Teachers suggested in 2008 that parents should have a right to have specific schooling in their own faith and that imams, rabbis and priests should be invited to offer religious instruction to pupils in all state schools.

Each government jurisdiction in England has a Local Agreed Syllabus which serves as a mandate for the scope and sequence of subject teaching for each Key Stage, and possibly for each school year; use of the syllabi is only mandated for certain types of schools, such as Voluntary Controlled schools. Voluntary Aided and independent schools are free to outline their own course of study; the schools most likely to actually use the syllabi maintained schools and Voluntary Aided nondenominational schools. The Qualifications and Curriculum Authority has also produced the non-statutory National Framework for Religious Education, which provides guidelines for the provision of RE at all key stages, and models the eight-levels as applied in National Curriculum subjects.

== France ==
In France, RE is replaced by a non-religious moral teaching (called civic and moral education: éducation civique et morale, EMC). Children can additionally receive, on a voluntary basis, a religious education, either at school in private religious school, or outside of school, in their religious community, if they are in a public (State) school. Although in some rare regions, namely Alsace-Moselle, the old Concordat of 1801 being still valid because of the German occupation at the time of the separation of Church and State in France and the strong stand of population in favour of this, religious education is compulsory, and a dispensation is necessary if the child refuses to be following (Catholic or Protestant) religious education.

== Ireland ==
In Ireland, religion is taught in a subject called Religious Education which is compulsory in many schools for the Junior Certificate, but available as an option for the Leaving Certificate. The course educates students about communities of faith, the foundations of the major world religions, the sacred texts, religious practices and festivals for Muslims, Jews, Hindus, Buddhists and Christians. Students also learn about religious change in Ireland, meaning in life, religious and non-religious responses to the search for meaning, atheism, agnosticism and other forms of belief. Students are also educated about morality in a number of different faiths and their moral codes.

== Israel ==
Israeli schools are divided into four different tracks: state-secular (Mamlachti), state-religious (Mamlachti dati), independent religious (חרדי Haredi or חינוך עצמאי Ḥinuch Atzmai), and Arab.

All Jewish students, regardless of religious affiliation, must pass bible classes to get a Bagrut certificate. Muslims, Christians, and the Druze are tested on their religion instead.

The majority of Israeli children attend state schools. The state-secular schools teach bible and Oral Torah. The state-secular bible classes also teach Biblical criticism. State-religious schools, catering to youngsters from the Orthodox sector (mainly Religious Zionist/Modern Orthodox), offer intensive Jewish studies programs, and emphasize tradition and observance. The Chinuch Atzmai schools focus almost entirely on Torah study and offer very little in terms of secular subjects. Secular subjects are mostly taught only at young ages. On middle and high school level, only religion is taught.

== Japan ==
There is no state-mandated RE curriculum in Japan. In place of RE, there is a short but nonetheless compulsory subject called "Ethics" (道徳(どうとく), doutoku; lit. "morality") in primary school, where the purpose is to teach moral values rather than to teach ethics as an academic subject. However, despite the stated secular stance, references to the majority religions of Shinto and Buddhism are sometimes made in class texts.

== Lebanon ==
Being a confessionalist country, with no state religion, Lebanon is expected to have a neutral position regarding religious education in its schools, which is not the case in the country, as well as many European and American countries. Lebanon doesn't have a law concerning RE in its educational establishments. Schools have the right to either give RE classes, or do the opposite. Religious classes are not obligatory, nor banned, and they are not replaced by "ethics" classes.

Private schools (Christian and Muslim) give mandatory religious classes, reflecting their religious identification. Students from other religions don't take any classes during the religious ones, but they always can sign up for the RE class. Catholic schools give only Catholic classes, mandatory for Christian students, but can be signed up for by Muslim students. If not, Muslims do not take any classes in parallel to Christian ones. Public schools have a somewhat more liberal religious program. A Lebanese public school may give or not give RE classes which regard the predominant religion of the population in the area the school is located in. Students are required to take these classes, whether they are Christian or Muslim. A public school located in a mixed area would prefer not to give RE classes, unless voted otherwise by locals. RE classes may be both Christian and Muslim at the same time in this case, and students divide when this happens.

== Malaysia and Sri Lanka ==
The Malaysian education system makes Moral Studies compulsory for non-Muslim students at secondary and primary schools. Muslim students instead partake in Islamic Studies lessons. There are special religious classes (Kelas Aliran Agama) in normal schools in addition to government-funded religious schools (Sekolah Menengah Kebangsaan Agama) and (Sekolah Agama Bantuan Kerajaan). Both subjects figure among the seven compulsory subjects undertaken by students for the Sijil Pelajaran Malaysia. There has been considerable debate about the usefulness of the "Moral" subject, primarily due to the strict exam-oriented marking schemes.

In Sri Lanka, there is compulsory of teaching religion for students in public and private schools.As a predominantly Buddhist country, Sri lanka gave textbooks for their children to learn.In Sri Lanka, there are Hindus, Islam and Roman Catholics and Christians too.So, Government send all of them a textbook for their religion based education.In their exam " Government Certificate of Education - Ordinary Level " religion is a compulsory subject.In their Advanced Level exams, there are many regional subjects too.

== Norway ==
As of 2007, Article 2 of the Constitution of Norway mandates Evangelical-Lutheran parents to provide a religious upbringing for their children. With the revision of the Constitution in 2012, this mandate was removed. In the education system, religious education is found in a subject now labeled KRLE (Christianity, religion and ethical education). A minimum of 50% of the subject should be on Christianity, yet preaching has been disapproved since 1969.

== Scotland ==
In Scottish state schools, religious education is called "Religious and Moral Education" from ages 5 to 14, and "Religious, Moral and Philosophical Studies" from 14 to 18.

The majority of state schools in are non-denominational, but as a result of the Education Act 1918, separate denominational state schools were also established. The vast majority of denominational state schools are Roman Catholic. The school buildings built and maintained by the Roman Catholic Church were handed over to the state under the Education Act. Since then, the Catholic schools are fully funded by the Scottish Government and administered by the Education and Lifelong Learning Directorate. As part of the deal, there are specific legal provisions to ensure the promotion of a Catholic ethos in such schools: applicants for positions in the areas of Religious Education, Guidance or Senior Management must be approved by the Roman Catholic Church in Scotland, which also appoints a chaplain to each of its schools.

There are also a number of Scottish Episcopal schools, and one Jewish state primary school.

== South Africa ==
The South African National Policy on Religion and Education adopted in September 2003 provides for religion education, i.e. education about diverse religions, which does not promote any particular religion in the public school curriculum. The policy does not apply to private schools.

== Middle East ==
The majority of Middle Eastern countries provide compulsory religious studies in both private and public schools. The religious studies in private schools can be based on the religious beliefs of the student and can be complied with by the school.

== United States ==
In public schools, U.S. law allows for religious education under released time during school hours; LifeWise Academy and Child Evangelism Fellowship are examples of interdenominational Christian programs that utilize this.
