= Hasnul Zulkarnain Abdul Munaim =

Malaysian politician

- حسن الذوالقرنين بن عبدالمنيم

Exco roles (Perak)
- 2018–2020: Chairman of the Communication, Multimedia, Non-governmental Organisations and Co-operatives Development

Faction represented in Perak State Legislative Assembly
- 2018–2020: Pakatan Harapan
- 2020–2021: Perikatan Nasional
- 2021–2022: Independent

Personal details
- Born: 16 July 1980 (age 46) Kuala Kangsar, Perak, Malaysia
- Citizenship: Malaysian
- Party: PAS (Until 2015); AMANAH (2015–2020); Independent (2020,2021-present); BERSATU (2020-2021)
- Other political affiliations: Pakatan Harapan (PH) (2018–2020); Perikatan Nasional (PN) (2020); Muafakat Nasional (MN) (2020)
- Spouse: Nadila Sharif
- Children: 5
- Education: Politeknik Ungku Omar
- Occupation: Politician
- Profession: Businessman

Hasnul Zulkarnain Abdul Munaim (Jawi: حسن الذوالقرنين بن عبدالمنيم, born 16 July 1980) is a Malaysian politician. He has been Member of the Perak State Legislative Assembly for Titi Serong from 2018 to 2022.

== Background ==
Hasnul was born on 16 July 1980 in Kuala Kangsar, Perak, Malaysia. He had studied at the Sekolah Kebangsaan Sultan Idris 11; Sekolah Menengah Clifford, Kuala Kangsar and Sekolah Menengah Teknik Padang, Rengas before continuing his studies at the Politeknik Ungku Omar, Ipoh for Diploma in Civil Engineering. He married Nadila Sharif and the couple has five children. Before entering politics, he run his business of construction, a PROTON car service centre in Kuala Kangsar and Restoran La Parra in Ipoh.

== Politics career ==
Hasnul was previously a member of Pan-Malaysian Islamic Party (PAS) before he joined National Trust Party (AMANAH) of Pakatan Harapan (PH) coalition in 2015. He was elected Perak assemblyman after winning the Titi Serong state seat as AMANAH candidate in 2018 general election (GE14). He was later appointed the Member of the Perak State Executive Council (EXCO) for Communication, Multimedia, Non-governmental Organisations and Co-operatives Development until the collapse of the PH state government in 2020 Malaysian political crisis. In the aftermath, he quit AMANAH and turned to become independent aligned to the new ruling Perikatan Nasional (PN) coalition in March 2020. and later joined its component BERSATU in July 2020, However, on 23 March 2021 he was sack from BERSATU due to his actions in supporting Perak UMNO chairman Saarani Mohamad as Perak Menteri Besar.

== Controversies and issues ==
During Hasnul's five months of Perak Football Association (PAFA) presidency, he was criticised for his actions of showing off the Malaysia Cup trophy inappropriately amid the success of Perak team becoming the champion. He at last resigned as the President of PAFA ending his tenure from August to October 2018.

== Election results ==
Perak State Legislative Assembly
Year	Constituency	Candidate	Votes	Pct	Opponent(s)	Votes	Pct	Ballots cast	Majority	Turnout
2018	N08 Titi Serong	Hasnul Zulkarnain Abdul Munaim (AMANAH)	7,600	34.46%	Norsalewati Mat Norwani (UMNO)	7,460	33.83%	22,369	140	83.70%
2018	N08 Titi Serong	Hasnul Zulkarnain Abdul Munaim (AMANAH)	7,600	34.46%	Abu Bakar Hussain (PAS)	6,993	31.71%	22,369	140	83.70%
