= Malaysian CARE =

- Malaysian Christian Association of Relief
- Formation: 1979
- Founder: Rev. Peter John Young (Founding Executive Director)
- Founded at: Kuala Lumpur, Malaysia
- Type: Nonprofit organization
- Legal status: NGO
- Purpose: Charity
- Headquarters: Kuala Lumpur
- Location: Wisma Care (HQ), 15, Jalan Tasik Selatan 3, Bandar Tasik Selatan, 57000 Kuala Lumpur. Tel : +603-9212 0162
- Region served: Malaysia
- Website: www.malaysiancare.org

Malaysian Christian Association of Relief (abbrev: Malaysian CARE) was founded in 1979, is based in Malaysia, with services located in Selangor and Perak.

== History ==
Malaysian CARE was founded in 1979 by a group of young Christians. The first Board was elected on 24 November 1978, composed of Wong Kim Kong, Lim Heng Seng, Lim Wei Meng, Shirley Lee, Jack Cheah, Liew Chee Kien, Steven Chong, and Doreen Chan. The first Advisors were Mr. David Boler, Rev. Douglas Anderson and Mr. Timothy Phua. On 1 January 1980, Rev. Peter Young was appointed as the first Executive Director of Malaysian Care.

== Activities ==
In 2013, one of the organization's community staff members, visited PLC with TARC (Tunku Abdul Rahman College) interns to assist in the interviewing and counseling of residents. This was to benefit them for their counseling degree. The Malaysian CARE staff and students conducted a prayer for the residents. On 8 March 2014, Malaysian CARE was invited to Kajang Assembly of God to educate and share about the activities in which they engage as part of the church’s initiative to bless the less fortunate.

== See also ==
- Early Intervention Centres in Malaysia
