= Titi Serong =

Political subdivision in Malaysia

Titi Serong (N08)
Perak constituency
- Coordinates: 5°6′18″N 100°28′3″E

State constituency
- Legislature: Perak State Legislative Assembly
MLA
Hakimi Hamzi Hayat
PN
- Constituency created: 1984
- First contested: 1986
- Last contested: 2022

Demographics
- Electors (2022): 35,900

Titi Serong is a state constituency in Perak, Malaysia, that has been represented in the Perak State Legislative Assembly.

== Demographics ==
Ethnic breakdown of Titi Serong's electorate as of 2022
1. Malay (73.3%)
2. Chinese (17.3%)
3. Indian (8.45%)
4. Other ethnicities (0.91%)

== History ==
=== Polling districts ===
According to the federal gazette issued on 31 October 2022, the Titi Serong constituency is divided into 15 polling districts.

State constituency	Polling Districts	Code	Location
Titi Serong (N08）	Parit Sungai Betul	057/08/01	SK Tanjong Piandang
Titi Serong (N08）	Sungai Labu	057/08/02	SRA Rakyat Sungai Megat Aris Bagan Tiang
Titi Serong (N08）	Sungai Megat Aris	057/08/03	SK Sungai Megat Aris
Titi Serong (N08）	Sungai Kota	057/08/04	SK Sungai Megat Aris
Titi Serong (N08）	Kedai Empat	007/08/05	SK Haji Ramli
Titi Serong (N08）	Sungai Star	007/08/06	SK Sungai Star
Titi Serong (N08）	Kampong Perak	007/08/07	SK Titi Serong
Titi Serong (N08）	Kampong Kedah	007/08/08	SK Kampong Kedah
Titi Serong (N08）	Parit Buntar	007/08/09	SK Sri Kerian
Titi Serong (N08）	Seri Tenggara	057/08/10	SK Baru Parit Buntar
Titi Serong (N08）	Jalan Kedah	057/08/11	SK Wawasan
Titi Serong (N08）	Taman Kerian	057/08/12	SMK Sri Perak
Titi Serong (N08）	Titi Serong	057/08/13	SMA Al-Tahzib
Titi Serong (N08）	Tebok Haji Musa	057/08/14	Pusat Kecermelangan Padi Jabatan Pertanian Titi Serong
Titi Serong (N08）	Parit Tok Tengah	057/08/15	SMA Al Falah

=== Representation history ===
Members of the Legislative Assembly for Titi Serong
Assembly	No	Years	Name	Party
Constituency created from Simpang Lima and Kuala Kurau
7th	N05	1986–1990	Mohd Taib Hanafiah	BN (UMNO)
8th	N05	1990–1995	Mohd Taib Hanafiah	BN (UMNO)
9th	N06	1995–1999	Abdul Latif Mat Ali	BN (UMNO)
10th	N06	1999–2004	Ahmad Azhar Sharin	BA (PAS)
11th	N08	2004–2008	Abu Bakar Mat Ali	BN (UMNO)
12th	N08	2008–2013	Khalil Idham Lim Abdullah (林川興)	PR (PAS)
13th	N08	2013–2015	Abu Bakar Hussian	PR (PAS)
13th	N08	2015–2016	Abu Bakar Hussian	PAS
13th	N08	2016–2018	Abu Bakar Hussian	GS (PAS)
14th	N08	2018–2020	Hasnul Zulkarnain Abdul Munaim	PH (AMANAH)
14th	N08	2020	Hasnul Zulkarnain Abdul Munaim	IND
14th	N08	2020–2021	Hasnul Zulkarnain Abdul Munaim	PN (BERSATU)
14th	N08	2021–2022	Hasnul Zulkarnain Abdul Munaim	IND
15th	N08	2022–present	Hakimi Hamzi Hayat	PN (PAS)

== Election results ==
Perak state election, 2022: Titi Serong
Party	Candidate	Votes	%	∆%
PN	Hakimi Hamzi Hayat	13,565	47.84	▲47.84
PH	Muhammad Nakhaie Wahab	8,291	29.24	▲29.24
BN	Shahrul Nizam Razali	6,497	22.91	▼10.92
Total valid votes		28,724	100.00	
Total rejected ballots		314		
Unreturned ballots		57		
Turnout		29,095	80.81	▼2.88
Registered electors		35,900		
Majority		5,274	18.60	▲18.45
PN gain from PKR		Swing		?

Perak state election, 2018: Titi Serong
Party	Candidate	Votes	%	∆%
PKR	Hasnul Zulkarnain Abdul Munaim	7,600	33.98	▲33.98
BN	Norsalewati Mat Norwani	7,460	33.83	▼12.41
PAS	Abu Bakar Hussian	6,993	31.71	▼22.05
Total valid votes		22,053	98.59	
Total rejected ballots		265	1.18	
Unreturned ballots		51	0.23	
Turnout		22,369	83.69	▼2.81
Registered electors		26,727		
Majority		140	0.15	▼7.37
PKR gain from PAS		Swing		?
Source(s) "RESULTS OF CONTESTED ELECTION AND STATEMENTS OF THE POLL AFTER THE OFFICIAL ADDITION OF VOTES".

Perak state election, 2013: Titi Serong
Party	Candidate	Votes	%	∆%
PAS	Abu Bakar Hussian	12,839	53.76	▲0.71
BN	Abdul Raman Suliman	11,045	46.24	▼0.71
Total valid votes		23,884	98.20	
Total rejected ballots		341	1.40	
Unreturned ballots		96	0.39	
Turnout		24,321	86.50	▲7.19
Registered electors		28,107		
Majority		1,794	7.52	▲1.44
PAS hold		Swing		
Source(s) "KEPUTUSAN PILIHAN RAYA UMUM DEWAN UNDANGAN NEGERI".

Perak state election, 2008: Titi Serong
Party	Candidate	Votes	%	∆%
PAS	Khalil Idham Lim Abdullah	10,012	53.04	▲9.96
BN	Muamar Ghadafi Jamaludin	8,863	46.96	▼9.96
Total valid votes		18,875	98.30	
Total rejected ballots		276	1.44	
Unreturned ballots		51	0.27	
Turnout		19,202	79.31	▲1.62
Registered electors		24,210		
Majority		1,149	6.08	▼7.76
PAS gain from BN		Swing		?
Source(s) "KEPUTUSAN PILIHAN RAYA UMUM DEWAN UNDANGAN NEGERI PERAK BAGI TAHUN 2008".

Perak state election, 2004: Titi Serong
Party	Candidate	Votes	%	∆%
BN	Abu Bakar Mat Ali	10,269	56.92	▲11.71
PAS	Ahmad Azhar Sharin	7,773	43.08	▼11.71
Total valid votes		18,042	98.48	
Total rejected ballots		257	1.40	
Unreturned ballots		22	0.12	
Turnout		18,321	77.69	▲5.41
Registered electors		23,581		
Majority		2,496	13.84	▲4.26
BN gain from PAS		Swing		?
Source(s) "KEPUTUSAN PILIHAN RAYA UMUM DEWAN UNDANGAN NEGERI PERAK BAGI TAHUN 2004".

Perak state election, 1999: Titi Serong
Party	Candidate	Votes	%	∆%
PAS	Ahmad Azhar Sharin	8,358	54.79	▲21.16
BN	Abdul Latif Mat Ali	6,896	45.21	▼21.16
Total valid votes		15,254	97.44	
Total rejected ballots		363	2.32	
Unreturned ballots		37	0.24	
Turnout		15,654	72.28	▲1.67
Registered electors		21,656		
Majority		1,462	9.58	▼23.16
PAS gain from BN		Swing		?
Source(s) "KEPUTUSAN PILIHAN RAYA UMUM DEWAN UNDANGAN NEGERI PERAK BAGI TAHUN 1999".

Perak state election, 1995: Titi Serong
Party	Candidate	Votes	%	∆%
BN	Abdul Latif Mat Ali	9,918	66.37	▲7.40
PAS	Khalid Abdul Hamid	5,025	33.63	▼7.40
Total valid votes		14,943	97.20	
Total rejected ballots		374	2.43	
Unreturned ballots		56	0.36	
Turnout		15,373	70.61	▲3.27
Registered electors		21,771		
Majority		4,893	32.74	▲15.46
BN hold		Swing		
Source(s) "KEPUTUSAN PILIHAN RAYA UMUM DEWAN UNDANGAN NEGERI PERAK BAGI TAHUN 1995".

Perak state election, 1990: Titi Serong
Party	Candidate	Votes	%	∆%
BN	Mohd Taib Hanafiah	8,256	58.97	▲3.85
PAS	Khalid Abdul Hamid	5,744	41.03	▼3.85
Total valid votes		14,000	96.30	
Total rejected ballots		538	3.71	
Unreturned ballots		0	0.00	
Turnout		14,538	73.88	▲4.23
Registered electors		19,677		
Majority		2,512	17.28	▲7.36
BN hold		Swing		
Source(s) "KEPUTUSAN PILIHAN RAYA UMUM DEWAN UNDANGAN NEGERI PERAK BAGI TAHUN 1990".

Perak state election, 1986: Titi Serong
Party	Candidate	Votes	%
BN	Mohd Taib Hanafiah	6,703	55.12
PAS	Jaafar Ali	5,457	44.88
Total valid votes		12,160	96.90
Total rejected ballots		389	3.10
Unreturned ballots		0	0.00
Turnout		12,549	69.65
Registered electors		18,016	
Majority		1,246	9.92
This was a new constituency created.
Source(s) "KEPUTUSAN PILIHAN RAYA UMUM DEWAN UNDANGAN NEGERI PERAK BAGI TAHUN 1986".
