= Razak Report =

1956 Malayan educational proposal

The Razak Report was a Malayan educational proposal written in the 1956. Named after the then Education Minister, Tun Abdul Razak, its goal was to reform the education system in Malaya. The report was incorporated into the Section 3 of the Education Ordinance of 1957 and served the basis of the educational framework for independent Malaya and eventually Malaysia. Private schools were nationalized, education was expanded at all levels and was heavily subsidized, and the growth in enrollment rate accelerated.

The Razak Report was a compromise between the Barnes Report (favoured by the Malays) and the Fenn-Wu Report (favoured by the Chinese and Indians). The Barnes Report was formerly passed into law as the Education Ordinance of 1952. While the Razak Report forwards the Malay language as the main medium of instruction, it allows the retention of other language medium schools.

The Report provides for Malay, English, Chinese, and Tamil schools at the primary school level, and Malay and English schools at the secondary school level. Malay-medium schools are referred to as "national" schools, while other schools are referred to as "national-type" schools. All schools are government-funded and use a common national curriculum regardless of school type.

Other provisions include:

- Formation of a single system of national education
- Commencement of a Malayan-orientated curriculum
- Conception of a single system of evaluation for all
- Recognition of the eventual objective of making Bahasa Melayu the main medium of instruction.

== Rahman Talib Report ==
In 1960, the Rahman Talib Report was introduced and incorporated in the Education Act 1961. Among others, it called for:

- Stress on 3M basic education — Membaca, Menulis, dan Mengira (reading, writing, and arithmetic)
- Stress on a strong spiritual education and the desired elements of discipline
- Stress on a Malayan curriculum
- Upper secondary education of two streams, academic and vocational
- Opportunity to continue education from 9 years to 11 years
- Facilitation of education management procedures to improve the overall quality of education.

== See also ==
- Barnes Report
