= Racial polarization =

Racial polarization is the process whereby a population of individuals with different ancestry is divided into separate and distinct racial groups.

== Bermuda ==
In Bermuda, around 55% of the population is identified as black, followed by 34% white (further subdivided into a British-descended majority and a Portuguese-descended minority), while the remainder are mixed or other (chiefly Asian). Politically, the territory's two political parties are often described along racial lines, the United Bermuda Party (UBP) being supported by Bermuda's white minority, while the Progressive Labour Party (PLP) is supported by the black majority. In terms of popular support, few whites would not vote for the UBP (an April 2009 poll found that some 85% of whites would vote for the party, while only 4% would vote PLP), while black voters favoured the PLP (in the aforementioned poll, 62% of blacks would vote PLP and 14% UBP).

White rejection of the PLP is often linked to repeated racist rhetoric from the party, aimed not only at whites but at black opponents who have been referred to as "house niggers" (race traitors). The party has even been described as a "write-off" in terms of diversity by members of the Portuguese-Bermudian community, which is often regarded as a separate ethnic/racial group. Black rejection of the UBP stems from associating the party with racial segregation and slavery; while formed in the 1960s, white old money that was involved in those institutions supports the party. Within the House of Assembly of Bermuda, there is negligible white presence, with only five white MPs (four UBP and one PLP) out of thirty-six (around 14%); in the appointed Senate of Bermuda, the white presence is three out of eleven (around 27%). Economically, the advantage lies in the white population, with whites holding higher positions and earning higher incomes; these figures do not distinguish between Bermudians and temporary expatriate workers, leading to exaggerated figures stemming from the hire of executives from the United States, Canada, and the United Kingdom (thus, typically white), and the hire of unskilled, poorly treated labourers from the Caribbean, Jamaica in particular, (thus, typically black) and so leave their relevance unknown.

== Malaysia ==
Sociologist Syed Farid Alatas observed: "We do not live according to the three principles for harmonious relations – recognising the multi-cultural origins of civilization, inter-religious encounters and showing respect and understanding the point of the other. We have little appreciation for each other’s religion and culture. Our education system does not inculcate these attitudes in us but instead tends to polarise us. We have little appreciation for each other’s religion and culture. In China, there is a strong interaction between Islam and Chinese culture." He also said: "Dialogue is a matter of national integration but the Malaysian education system does not inculcate the three pre-requisites for inter-religious cooperation and relations."
