= Barnes Report =

British proposal to develop national education system in British Malaya

The Barnes Report was a British proposal put forward in 1951 to develop a national education system in British Malaya. The Fenn-Wu Report, favoured by the Chinese, did not meet with Malay approval. In the end, the Barnes Report's recommendations for English-medium "national schools" were implemented by the 1952 Education Ordinance, over vocal Chinese protests, who were upset by the lack of provision for non-Malay vernacular schools.

== History ==
Before the end of British rule in 1957, the educational system in Malaya was reorganised along the lines of the Barnes Report of 1951. The British government wanted a policy that would be relevant to the political and socio-economic goals of the people, Malaya's three principal ethnic communities—Malays, Chinese and Indians. The Barnes Report recommended a national school system, which would provide primary education for 6 years in Malay and English, hoping that over time, the demand for separate schools in Chinese and Tamil would wane and disappear. The reaction of the Chinese community to the Barnes Report was not positive. While the community agreed with the basic recommendation that Malay be treated as the principal language, it felt that there should be some provision to recognise Chinese and Tamil as important components of a new definition of Malaya's national identity.

To pacify ethnic sensitivities, the British government approved a modified formula that would allow bilingualism in Malay schools (Malay and English) and a three-language "solution" in Tamil and Chinese schools (either Tamil-Malay-English or Chinese-Malay-English), by recommending a common curriculum for all schools, hoping that a national school system would evolve.

The Barnes Report was unsuccessful, and in 1955, two years before Malaya's independence, the Razak Report endorsed the concept of a national education system based on Malay, being the main medium of instruction.

== See also ==
- Razak Report
