= Early Intervention Centres in Malaysia =

The First Early Intervention Centre in Malaysia was established in 1987. It was initiated by Malaysian Care, a non-governmental organisation (NGO), with the help of Robert Deller, a child psychologist from Britain.

== Government Role in Early Intervention ==
The Education Ministry's foray into early intervention services began in 2004 for children below six who have visual, hearing and learning impairments. The basic problems of running early intervention centres are lack of resources, trained staff and financial support from the Malaysian Government. The NGOs rely largely on donations and volunteers to keep the centres going. The long waiting list is not unusual as the number of special needs children continues to rise.

In 2003, primary education was made compulsory, but the services for learning disabled students remain limited and fragmented.

== The Early Intervention Model ==
Look at Early Childhood Intervention
