= Sekolah Menengah Kebangsaan Agama =

Sekolah Menengah Kebangsaan Agama (SMKA) or National Islamic Secondary School (Arabic: المدرسة الثانوية الوطنية الدينية) is a type of institutional group of education established and managed by the Malaysian Ministry of Education (MOE). SMKA forms Religious Education Institution (IPA) with two other types of institutional group of education, which are Government-funded Religious School (SABK) and normal secondary schools with Religious Stream Class (KAA)

== History ==
An idea to establish SMKA was inspired by the then MOE Director for Islamic Education, Nik Mohammed Mohyideen Wan Musa. It was coincide with the aspiration of MOE and the Muslim community who realised its benefit. Several efforts were made before, including assistance to independent Islamic schools and recommendation to them to apply new system.

The establishment of SMKA was in line with the effort to modernise Malaysian education system on that time. Improvements of Islamic education system in Islamic schools were in accordance with current developments as well. Thus, an idea inspired by Nik Mohammed Mohyideen was turned to reality by Dr. Abdul Hamid Othman and Zainal Abidin Abdul Kadir, both were top officials responsible for Islamic affairs in Malaysia.

In 1970s, independent Islamic schools were not received well from the public due to unorganised administrative system and the lack of facilities, while the people's awareness towards education increased at the same time. Therefore, MOE consulted with state governments in Peninsular Malaysia to adjust administrative and curricular system in Islamic schools with those in daily schools.

Most of Islamic schools, before this, emphasise Islamic studies and Arabic language too much without giving attention to other subjects available in daily schools like science, mathematics, geography and history. This was due to the inability of Islamic schools to provide laboratories. Consequently, graduates of Islamic schools were less competitive in human resources market and current challenges faced by the people.

In 1977, MOE established SMKA, took over 11 state and independent Islamic schools and gave them the status of SMKA. Since then, the number of SMKAs has increased due to the building and opening of new SMKAs all over Malaysia (like a number of SMKAs in Malaysia) and promotion of status from normal secondary school to SMKA (as in the case of SMKA Tun Perak in Jasin, Melaka which was a normal secondary school before 2012).

However, a small number of SMKAs have lost its status due to promotion of status to a Fully Residential School (like SBPI Jempol in Batu Kikir, Negeri Sembilan, which was previously SMKA Jempol sometimes in 2002) and return to the respective State Government (as in the case of SMKA Tun Ahmad Zaidi in Kuching, Sarawak in 2012).

As of 2019, Malaysia has 60 SMKAs. The newest SMKAs opened in Malaysia have been SMKA Pagoh, Johor (which was opened in January 2018) and SMKA Jerlun, Kedah (which was opened in January 2019).

== Features ==
SMKA is different comparing to other secondary schools. SMKA is a place for those who want to learn and practice Islamic culture, not only through the teaching and learning of Arabic language, Jawi and Quranic skills, but also activities applying Islamic values. SMKA students, upon their graduation, have a wide chance to further their studies locally and internationally in various fields. Consequently, SMKA will be able not only to produce wise and accountable Islamic preacher, but also to produce experts who understand Islam.

== List of SMKA ==
As of 2018, SMKAs are as follows:

No.	Name of School	Shortform	Status	Location	Est.	Motto	Official website
1	SMKA Arau	SMKAA	TMUA	Arau, Perlis	1933	Ilmu, Usaha, Jaya	
2	SMKA (P) Alawiyah	SMKAP	SKK	Kangar, Perlis	1947	Ilmu Asas Taqwa	
3	SMKA Kedah	SMKAK	SKK, TMUA	Alor Setar, Kedah	1984	Ketekunan Asas Kejayaan	
4	SMKA Baling	SMKAB	–	Baling, Kedah	1996	Berilmu, Beramal, Bertaqwa	
5	SMKA Sik	SMKAS	SKK	Sik, Kedah	1998	Beriman, Berilmu, Beramal	–
6	SMKA Yan	SMKAY	–	Yan, Kedah	1997	Berilmu, Beramal, Berjihad	
7	SMKA al-Irshad	SMAI	SBT	Kepala Batas, Penang	1977	الإيمان أساس النجاح	–
8	SMKA Sheikh Abdullah Fahim	SMKANT	SKK, TMUA	Nibong Tebal, Penang	1995	Iman, Amal, Taqwa	–
9	SMKA al-Mashoor (L)	SMASH	SKK	Air Itam, Penang	1916	Beriman dan Berilmu	–
10	SMKA (P) al-Mashoor	SMASH	–	Georgetown, Penang	1916	Beriman dan Berilmu	–
11	SMKA Sultan Azlan Shah	KASAS	SKK	Bota, Perak	1984	Berilmu, Beramal, Bertaqwa	–
12	SMKA Slim River	SMKASR	–	Slim River, Perak	1993	Berilmu, Beriman, Beramal	–
13	SMKA Kerian	KERIS	TMUA	Semanggol, Perak	1999	Istiqamah Cemerlang	–
14	SMKA Tun Hajah Rahah	–	SKK	Sabak Bernam, Selangor	1983	Disiplin Teras Kejayaan	–
15	SMKA Kuala Selangor	KUSISS	SKK	Kuala Selangor, Selangor	1994	Iman, Ilmu, Amal	–
16	SMKA Maahad Hamidiah	MAHISS	SKK	Kajang, Selangor	1977	إن العلم نور	–
17	SMKA Kuala Lumpur	SMKAKL	TMUA	Kepong, Kuala Lumpur	1988	Berilmu, Beramal, Berbakti	
18	SMKA Putrajaya	SMAPUTRA	SKK	Precinct 11, Putrajaya	2011	Berilmu, Beriman, Berintegriti	
19	SMKA Sheikh Hj. Mohd. Said	SMKA SHAMS	SKK	Seremban, Negeri Sembilan	1959	Dunia dan Akhirat Tuntutan Hidup	
20	SMKA Dato' Hj. Abu Hassan Sail	SEMADAH	SKK, TMUA	Pedas, Negeri Sembilan	1995	Cemerlang di Dunia, Sejahtera di Akhirat	–
21	SMKA Sharifah Rodziah	SHAHROD	SBT	Telok Mas, Malacca	1977	Al-Amanah	
22	SMKA Sultan Muhammad	SULTAN	SKK	Batu Berendam, Malacca	1967	Ilmu Punca Kejayaan	
23	SMKA Tun Perak	–	–	Jasin, Malacca	1965	Maju Terus	
24	SMKA Maahad Muar	MAAHAD	SKK, TMUA	Muar, Johor	1963	العلم، الإيمان، العمل	
25	SMKA Segamat	SEMANGAT	–	Segamat, Johor	1988	العلم، الإيمان، العمل	
26	SMKA Johor Bahru	SMKAJB	SKK	Johor Bahru, Johor	1997	Beriman, Berilmu, Beramal	–
27	SMKA Bandar Penawar	–	–	Kota Tinggi, Johor	1993	Al-Falah	
28	SMKA Pagoh	–	–	Pagoh, Johor	2017	–	–
29	SMKA Tengku Ampuan Hajjah Afzan	SMKA TAHAP	SKK	Jerantut, Pahang	1984	Baca, Amal, Hayati	
30	SMKA Pahang	SMKAP	SKK	Muadzam Shah, Pahang	1996	Berilmu, Bertaqwa	–
31	SMKA Sheikh Abdul Malek	SHAMS	SKK	Kuala Terengganu, Terengganu	1984	اقرا، أسجد، اقترب	
32	SMKA Dato' Haji Abbas	SMKADHA	SKK	Kuala Terengganu, Terengganu	1953	العلم نور	–
33	SMKA Wataniah	SMKAWA	SKK	Besut, Terengganu	1950	العلم أساس العلى	
34	SMKA Durian Guling	SMKADG	SKK	Marang, Terengganu	1954	Belajar Berjasa	–
35	SMKA Nurul Ittifaq	SMKANI	–	Besut, Terengganu	1930	العلم أساس التقدم	–
36	SMKA Kuala Abang	SMKAKA	SKK	Dungun, Terengganu	1997	Al-Ihsan Hati Bestari	–
37	SMKA Naim Lilbanat	SMART NAIM	SBT	Kota Bharu, Kelantan	1941	Islam Suluh Tamadun	–
38	SMKA Falahiah	SMKAF	–	Kota Bharu, Kelantan	1939	نور على نور	–
39	SMKA Wataniah	–	SKK	Machang, Kelantan	–	Ilmu, Iman, Amal	–
40	SMKA Melor	–	SKK	Kota Bharu, Kelantan	1990	Iman, Amal, Taqwa	–
41	SMKA Tok Bachok	ToBaNISS	SKK, TMUA	Bachok, Kelantan	–	Beriman, Beristiqamah	–
42	SMKA Lati	–	SKK	Pasir Mas, Kelantan	2002	Beriman, Berilmu, Beramal	–
43	SMKA Tun Ahmadshah	TUNAS	–	Kota Kinabalu, Sabah	1988	Berilmu, Beramal, Bertaqwa	–
44	SMKA Kota Kinabalu	SMKAKK	TMUA	Kota Kinabalu, Sabah	1990	Berilmu, Beriman, Beramal	–
45	SMKA Limauan	SMALNIS	–	Papar, Sabah	1977	Beramal dan Bertaqwa	–
46	SMKA Tun Datu Mustapha	SMKA TDM	–	Papar, Sabah	2003	Berilmu, Beriman, Bertaqwa	–
47	SMKA Mohamad Ali	SEMEKAR	–	Ranau, Sabah	1989	Berilmu, Beramal, Bertaqwa	–
48	SMKA Tun Said	SMATS KB	–	Kota Belud, Sabah	2001	Beriman, Berilmu, Beramal	–
49	SMKA Keningau	SEMAKEN	–	Keningau, Sabah	2013	Berilmu, Beramal, Bertaqwa	
50	SMKA Tun Juhar	SEMAJU	–	Sandakan, Sabah	1989	Tauhid Asas Iman	–
51	SMKA Tun Sakaran	SMATS Semporna	–	Semporna, Sabah	1983	من جد وجد	–
52	SMKA Sheikh Hj. Othman Abdul Wahab	SMKA SHOAW	–	Kuching, Sarawak	1976	Berilmu, Beramal, Bertaqwa	
53	SMKA Matang 2	SAMAKu	–	Kuching, Sarawak	1985	Ilmu, Iman, Amal	
54	SMKA Sibu	SMKAS	–	Sibu, Sarawak	1985	Berilmu, Bertaqwa, Berbakti	–
55	SMKA Miri	SMKAMi	–	Miri, Sarawak	1985	Berjihad dan Bertaqwa	–
56	SMKA Limbang	SMKALim	–	Limbang, Sarawak	1985	Beriman, Berilmu, Beramal	–
57	SMKA Igan	SMKAI	–	Mukah, Sarawak	1985	Berilmu, Beriman, Beramal	–
58	SMKA Saratok	SMK ASAR	–	Saratok, Sarawak	2002	Berilmu, Beriman, Beramal, Bertaqwa	–
