= Government-funded Religious School =

Educational institutions established by Malaysian Ministry of Education (MOE)

Sekolah Agama Bantuan Kerajaan (SABK) or Government-funded Religious School (Arabic: المدرسة الدينية الممولة من الحكومة) is a type of institutional group of education established and managed by the Malaysian Ministry of Education (MOE). SABK forms Religious Education Institution (IPA) with two other types of institutional group of education, which are National Islamic Secondary School (SMKA) and normal schools with Religious Stream Class (KAA).

== History ==
The idea of having SABK was initiated in 1977. On that year, the Federal Government took over a number of religious schools from states. However, they did not become SABK but SMKA instead. Consequently, conflicts between Federal and state governments arisen. Therefore, the Federal Government decided to stop such action in 1983. This idea was then reinstated in 2005 upon recommendation of Special Committee of Tan Sri Murad a year before, which a state government-owned religious schools (SMAN) or a community religious schools (SAR) may register as an SABK.

As of 31 December 2023, 229 SABKs have been established in Malaysia. 44 of them are primary schools and 185 are secondary schools.
