= Kelas Aliran Agama =

Kelas Aliran Agama (KAA) or Religious Stream Class (Arabic: الفصل الديني) is a type of institutional group of education established and managed by the Malaysian Ministry of Education (MOE). KAA forms Religious Education Institution (IPA) with two other types of institutional group of education, which are National Islamic Secondary School (SMKA) and Government-funded Religious School (SABK).

== History ==
KAA was established in a number of secondary schools in 1987 to cater students who want to enter SMKA but did not deserve a place in SMKA. In February 1990, Director General of Education requested State Directors of Education to establish KAA in their respective state. In 1992, 130 secondary schools opened KAA. In 2015, the number of secondary schools with KAA increased to 595.

As of 30 April 2018, KAAs have been established in 618 normal secondary schools all over Malaysia.
