= Ungku Omar Polytechnic =

Oldest polytechnic in Malaysia

Coordinates: 4.5885157°N 101.1260066°E

- Politeknik Premier Ungku Omar
- Other names: PUO
- Motto: Home of TVET Champions
- Motto in English: Home of TVET Champions
- Type: Public
- Established: 02 June 1969
- Director: Dr. Hajah Salmi binti Che Meh B.C.N
- Administrative staff: 620 - as of July 2024
- Students: 6,279 - as of July 2024
- Location: Jalan Raja Musa Mahadi, Politeknik Ungku Omar, 31400 Ipoh, Perak, Malaysia, Ipoh, Perak, Malaysia
- Campus: Urban
- Website: www.puo.edu.my

Ungku Omar Polytechnic (PUO; Malay: Politeknik Premier Ungku Omar) is a polytechnic situated at Jalan Dairy (Jalan Raja Musa Mahadi), Ipoh, Malaysia which was named after the Ungku Omar bin Ungku Ahmad. It was established by the Malaysian Ministry of Education with help from UNESCO in 1969. It also received RM24.5 million funding from the United Nations Development Programme (UNDP). UNESCO was responsible for its construction. Ungku Omar Polytechnic is the first and the oldest polytechnic in Malaysia.

== History ==
Ungku Omar Polytechnic was established in 1969 by the Malaysian Ministry of Education, aided by UNESCO. A total of RM24.5 million was allocated by the United Nation Development Programme (UNDP). UNESCO was assigned with the responsibility of planning and executing the polytechnic's construction on an area of 22.6 hectares at Dairy Road, Ipoh. The polytechnic was named after the late Dato' Professor Ungku Omar Ahmad, in recognition of his valuable contributions to the nation, especially in the field of medical research.

For the first batch of 300 students, lectures were held beginning from 2 June 1969. At that time, the academic workforce consisted of 28 local lecturers. During the early stages, PUO only had four academic departments, namely the Civil Engineering Department, Electrical Engineering Department, Mechanical Engineering Department and Commerce Department, which offered various academic programmes at diploma and certificate levels.

== Departments ==
- Civil Engineering
  - Civil Engineering (DKA)
  - Geomatic Engineering (DGU)
  - Architecture (DSB)
- Electrical Engineering
  - Communication (DEP)
  - Computer Technology (DTK)
- Mechanical Engineering
  - Mechanical Engineering (DKM)
  - Automotive (DAD)
  - Air-conditioning & Refrigerating (DPU)
  - Mechatronics (DEM)
- Marine Engineering
  - Marine Engineering (DKP)
- Commerce
  - Business Studies (DPM)
  - Financial and Banking (DKB)
  - Accountancy (DAT)
  - Retail management (DRM)
  - Islamic Banking and Finance (DIB)
- General Studies
  - Islamic Studies
  - Moral Studies
  - English Language
  - Chinese Language
  - Japanese Language
- Information & Communication Technology
  - Digital Technology (DDT)
  - Network System (DNS)
  - Information Security (DIS)
- Mathematics, Science and Computer
