= KOSPINT =

Kolej Sains Pendidikan Islam Negeri Terengganu (KOSPINT) is a boarding secondary school located in Kuala Terengganu, Terengganu, Malaysia. KOSPINT has been awarded the status of a Bestari School (Smart School) equipped for high technology education.

== History ==
The concept of KOSPINT was conceived by JKKK with co-operation from UMNO Dun Serada in 1986. In 1988, an application was submitted to the State Government to apply for the school to be built on a 17-hectare (42-acre) site. The Government agreed the budget for the school construction in early 1995 and work started in November 1995. After the construction was completed, the Terengganu Religion Department proposed this new school as a Bestari School, where the students would be selected from the best that got four As in the UPSR (Ujian Pernilaian Sekolah Rendah) examination. On 8 June 1997 the school opened with 265 students supported by 26 teachers.

== Academic standards ==
The Penilaian Menengah Rendah 2003 examination produced an outstanding result with 75% of students achieving Grade A.
