= Silicon compounds =

Chemical compounds with at least one silicon atom

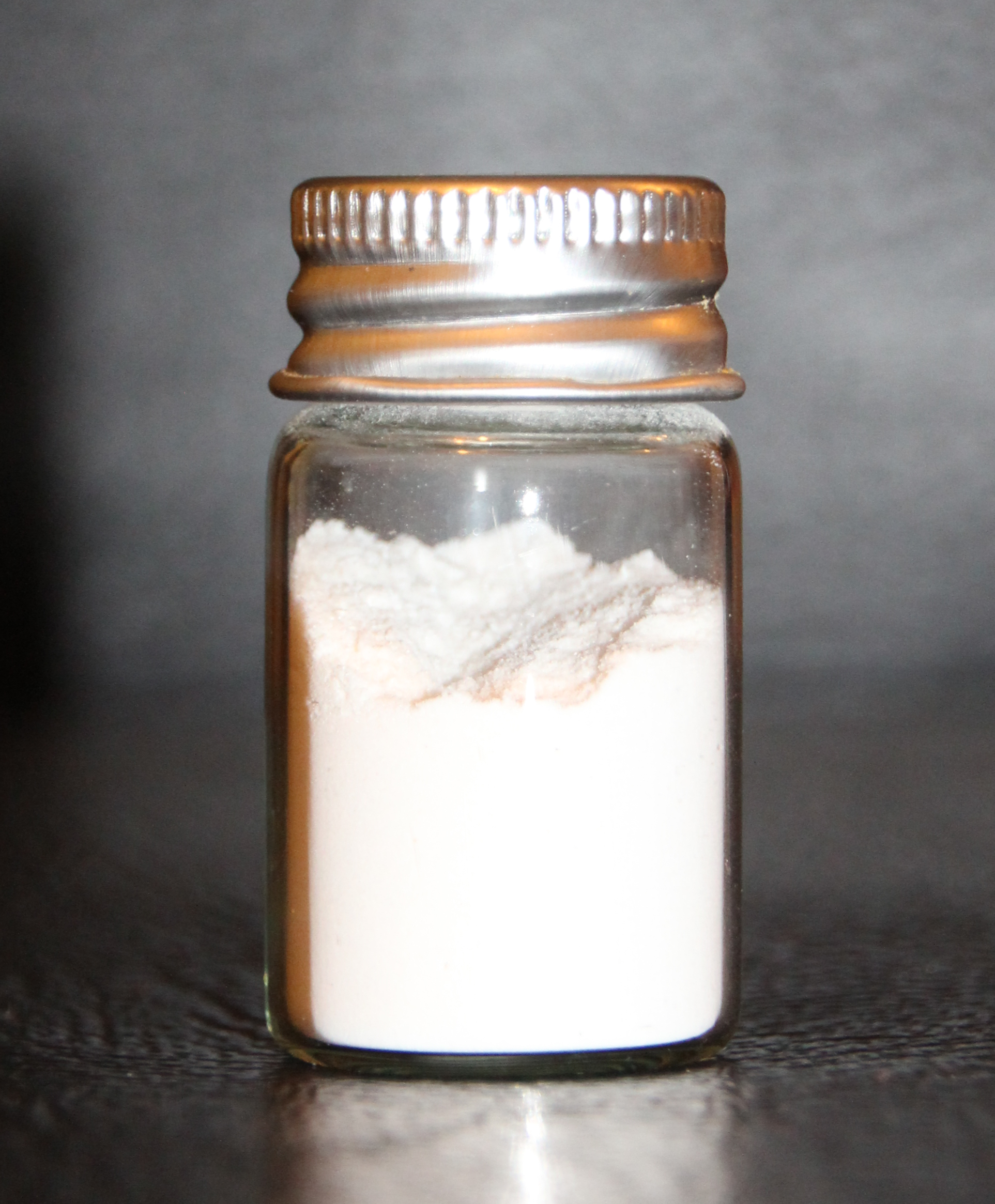
Sample of silicon dioxide, also known as sand

Silicon compounds are compounds containing the element silicon (Si). As a carbon group element, silicon often forms compounds in the +4 oxidation state, though many unusual compounds have been discovered that differ from expectations based on its valence electrons, including the silicides and some silanes. Metal silicides, silicon halides, and similar inorganic compounds can be prepared by directly reacting elemental silicon or silicon dioxide with stable metals or with halogens. Silanes, compounds of silicon and hydrogen, are often used as strong reducing agents, and can be prepared from aluminium–silicon alloys and hydrochloric acid.

Several inorganic compounds have been formed with silicon and other nonmetals such as sulfur and nitrogen; most of these compounds are highly incompatible with water. One of the most useful and successfully marketed inorganic silicon compounds is silicon carbide.

Naturally occurring silicon is found in silicate and aluminosilicate minerals. One of the most common silicon compounds found in the Earth's crust is silicon dioxide or silica, which often occurs as quartz.

Organosilicon compounds are fairly stable due to the similarity in strength of the Si–C bond to the C–C bond. Organosilicates include silicone polymers.

== Silicides ==
Phase diagram of the Fe–Si system

Many metal silicides are known, most of which have formulas that cannot be explained through simple appeals to valence: their bonding ranges from metallic to ionic and covalent. Some known stoichiometries are M_{6}Si, M_{5}Si, M_{4}Si, M_{15}Si_{4}, M_{3}Si, M_{5}Si_{2}, M_{2}Si, M_{5}Si_{3}, M_{3}Si_{2}, MSi, M_{2}Si_{3}, MSi_{2}, MSi_{3}, and MSi_{6}. They are structurally more similar to the borides than the carbides, in keeping with the diagonal relationship between boron and silicon, although the larger size of silicon than boron means that exact structural analogies are few and far between. The heats of formation of the silicides are usually similar to those of the borides and carbides of the same elements, but they usually melt at lower temperatures. Silicides are known for all stable elements in groups 1–10, with the exception of beryllium: in particular, uranium and the transition metals of groups 4–10 show the widest range of stoichiometries. Except for copper, the metals in groups 11–15 do not form silicides. Instead, most form eutectic mixtures, although the heaviest stable ones – mercury, thallium, lead, and bismuth – are completely immiscible with liquid silicon.

Usually, silicides are prepared by direct reaction of the elements. For example, the alkali metals and alkaline earth metals react with silicon or silicon oxide to give silicides. Nevertheless, even with these highly electropositive elements true silicon anions are not obtainable, and most of these compounds are semiconductors. For example, the alkali metal silicides (M^{+})_{4}(Si^{4−}_{4}) contain pyramidal tricoordinate silicon in the Si^{4−}_{4} anion, isoelectronic with white phosphorus, P_{4}. Metal-rich silicides tend to have isolated silicon atoms (e.g. Cu_{5}Si); with increasing silicon content, catenation increases, resulting in isolated clusters of two (e.g. U_{3}Si_{2}) or four silicon atoms (e.g. [K^{+}]_{4}[Si_{4}]^{4−}) at first, followed by chains (e.g. CaSi), layers (e.g. CaSi_{2}), or three-dimensional networks of silicon atoms spanning space (e.g. α-ThSi_{2}) as the silicon content rises even higher.

The silicides of the group 1 and 2 metals usually are more reactive than the transition metal silicides. The latter usually do not react with aqueous reagents, except for hydrofluoric acid; however, they do react with much more aggressive reagents such as liquid potassium hydroxide, or gaseous fluorine or chlorine when red-hot. The pre-transition metal silicides instead readily react with water and aqueous acids, usually producing hydrogen or silanes:

Na_{2}Si + 3 H_{2}O → Na_{2}SiO_{3} + 3 H_{2}
Mg_{2}Si + 2 H_{2}SO_{4} → 2 MgSO_{4} + SiH_{4}

Products often vary with the stoichiometry of the silicide reactant. For example, Ca_{2}Si is polar and non-conducting and has the anti-PbCl_{2} structure with single isolated silicon atoms, and reacts with water to produce calcium hydroxide, hydrated silicon dioxide, and hydrogen gas. CaSi with its zigzag chains of silicon atoms instead reacts to give silanes and polymeric SiH_{2}, while CaSi_{2} with its puckered layers of silicon atoms does not react with water, but will react with dilute hydrochloric acid: the product is a yellow polymeric solid with stoichiometry Si_{2}H_{2}O.

== Silanes ==
Speculation on silicon hydride chemistry started in the 1830s, contemporary with the development of synthetic organic chemistry. Silane itself, as well as trichlorosilane, were first synthesised by Friedrich Wöhler and Heinrich Buff in 1857 by reacting aluminium–silicon alloys with hydrochloric acid, and characterised as SiH_{4} and SiHCl_{3} by Charles Friedel and Albert Ladenburg in 1867. Disilane (Si_{2}H_{6}) followed in 1902, when it was first made by Henri Moissan and Samuel Smiles by the protonolysis of magnesium silicides. Further investigation had to wait until 1916 because of the great reactivity and thermal instability of the silanes; it was then that Alfred Stock began to study silicon hydrides in earnest with new greaseless vacuum techniques, as they were found as contaminants of his focus, the boron hydrides. The names silanes and boranes are his, based on analogy with the alkanes. The Moissan and Smiles method of preparation of silanes and silane derivatives via protonolysis of metal silicides is still used, although the yield is lowered by the hydrolysis of the products that occurs simultaneously, so that the preferred route today is to treat substituted silanes with hydride reducing agents such as lithium aluminium hydride in etheric solutions at low temperatures. Direct reaction of HX or RX with silicon, possibly with a catalyst such as copper, is also a viable method of producing substituted silanes.

The silanes comprise a homologous series of silicon hydrides with a general formula of Si_{n}H_{2n + 2}. They are all strong reducing agents. Unbranched and branched chains are known up to n=8, and the cycles Si_{5}H_{10} and Si_{6}H_{12} are also known. The first two, silane and disilane, are colourless gases; the heavier members of the series are volatile liquids. All silanes are very reactive and catch fire or explode spontaneously in air. They become less thermally stable with room temperature, so that only silane is indefinitely stable at room temperature, although disilane does not decompose very quickly (only 2.5% of a sample decomposes after the passage of eight months). They decompose to form polymeric polysilicon hydride and hydrogen gas. As expected from the difference in atomic weight, the silanes are less volatile than the corresponding alkanes and boranes, but more so than the corresponding germanes. They are much more reactive than the corresponding alkanes, because of the larger radius of silicon compared to carbon facilitating nucleophilic attack at the silicon, the greater polarity of the Si–H bond compared to the C–H bond, and the ability of silicon to expand its octet and hence form adducts and lower the reaction's activation energy.

Silane pyrolysis gives polymeric species and finally elemental silicon and hydrogen; indeed ultrapure silicon is commercially produced by the pyrolysis of silane. While the thermal decomposition of alkanes starts by the breaking of a C–H or C–C bond and the formation of radical intermediates, polysilanes decompose by eliminating silylenes :SiH_{2} or :SiHR, as the activation energy of this process (~210 kJ/mol) is much less than the Si–Si and Si–H bond energies. While pure silanes do not react with pure water or dilute acids, traces of alkali catalyse immediate hydrolysis to hydrated silicon dioxide. If the reaction is carried out in methanol, controlled solvolysis results in the products SiH_{2}(OMe)_{2}, SiH(OMe)_{3}, and Si(OMe)_{4}. The Si–H bond also adds to alkenes, a reaction which proceeds slowly and speeds up with increasing substitution of the silane involved. At 450 °C, silane participates in an addition reaction with acetone, as well as a ring-opening reaction with ethylene oxide. Direct reaction of the silanes with chlorine or bromine results in explosions at room temperature, but the reaction of silane with bromine at −80 °C is controlled and yields bromosilane and dibromosilane. The monohalosilanes may be formed by reacting silane with the appropriate hydrogen halide with an Al_{2}X_{6} catalyst, or by reacting silane with a solid silver halide in a heated flow reactor:

SiH_{4} + 2 AgCl SiH_{3}Cl + HCl + 2 Ag

Among the derivatives of silane, iodosilane (SiH_{3}I) and potassium silanide (KSiH_{3}) are very useful synthetic intermediates in the production of more complicated silicon-containing compounds: the latter is a colourless crystalline ionic solid containing K^{+} cations and SiH^{−}_{3} anions in the NaCl structure, and is made by the reduction of silane by potassium metal. Additionally, the reactive hypervalent species SiH^{−}_{5} is also known. With suitable organic substituents it is possible to produce stable polysilanes: they have surprisingly high electric conductivities, arising from sigma delocalisation of the electrons in the chain.

== Halides ==
Silicon and silicon carbide readily react with all four stable halogens, forming the colourless, reactive, and volatile silicon tetrahalides. Silicon tetrafluoride also may be made by fluorinating the other silicon halides, and is produced by the attack of hydrofluoric acid on glass. Heating two different tetrahalides together also produces a random mixture of mixed halides, which may also be produced by halogen exchange reactions. The melting and boiling points of these species usually rise with increasing atomic weight, though there are many exceptions: for example, the melting and boiling points drop as one passes from SiFBr_{3} through SiFClBr_{2} to SiFCl_{2}Br. The shift from the hypoelectronic elements in Group 13 and earlier to the Group 14 elements is illustrated by the change from an infinite ionic structure in aluminium fluoride to a lattice of simple covalent silicon tetrafluoride molecules, as dictated by the lower electronegativity of aluminium than silicon, the stoichiometry (the +4 oxidation state being too high for true ionicity), and the smaller size of the silicon atom compared to the aluminium atom.

Silicon tetrachloride is manufactured on a huge scale as a precursor to the production of pure silicon, silicon dioxide, and some silicon esters. The silicon tetrahalides hydrolyse readily in water, unlike the carbon tetrahalides, again because of the larger size of the silicon atom rendering it more open to nucleophilic attack and the ability of the silicon atom to expand its octet which carbon lacks. The reaction of silicon tetrafluoride with excess hydrofluoric acid produces the octahedral hexafluorosilicate anion SiF^{2−}_{6}.

Analogous to the silanes, halopolysilanes Si_{n}X_{2n + 2} also are known. While catenation in carbon compounds is maximised in the hydrogen compounds rather than the halides, the opposite is true for silicon, so that the halopolysilanes are known up to at least Si_{14}F_{30}, Si_{6}Cl_{14}, and Si_{4}Br_{10}. A suggested explanation for this phenomenon is the compensation for the electron loss of silicon to the more electronegative halogen atoms by pi backbonding from the filled p_{π} orbitals on the halogen atoms to the empty d_{π} orbitals on silicon: this is similar to the situation of carbon monoxide in metal carbonyl complexes and explains their stability. These halopolysilanes may be produced by comproportionation of silicon tetrahalides with elemental silicon, or by condensation of lighter halopolysilanes (trimethylammonium being a useful catalyst for this reaction).

== Silica ==
Silicon dioxide (SiO_{2}), also known as silica, is one of the best-studied compounds, second only to water. Twelve different crystal modifications of silica are known, the most common being α-quartz, a major constituent of many rocks such as granite and sandstone. It also is known to occur in a pure form as rock crystal; impure forms are known as rose quartz, smoky quartz, morion, amethyst, and citrine. Some poorly crystalline forms of quartz are also known, such as chalcedony, chrysoprase, carnelian, agate, onyx, jasper, heliotrope, and flint. Other modifications of silicon dioxide are known in some other minerals such as tridymite and cristobalite, as well as the much less common coesite and stishovite. Biologically generated forms are also known as kieselguhr and diatomaceous earth. Vitreous silicon dioxide is known as tektites, and obsidian, and rarely as lechatelierite. Some synthetic forms are known as keatite. Opals are composed of complicated crystalline aggregates of partially hydrated silicon dioxide.

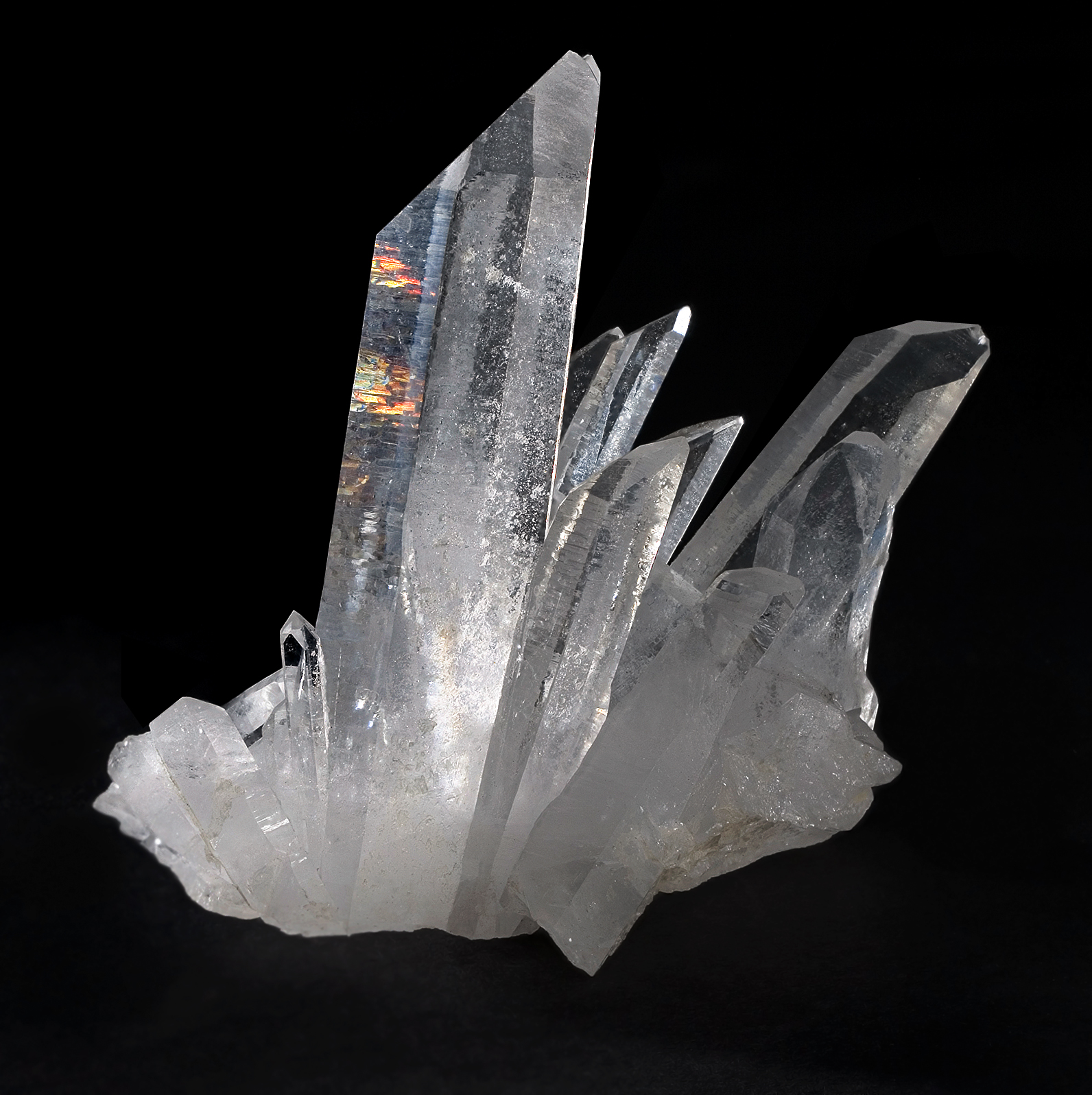
Quartz

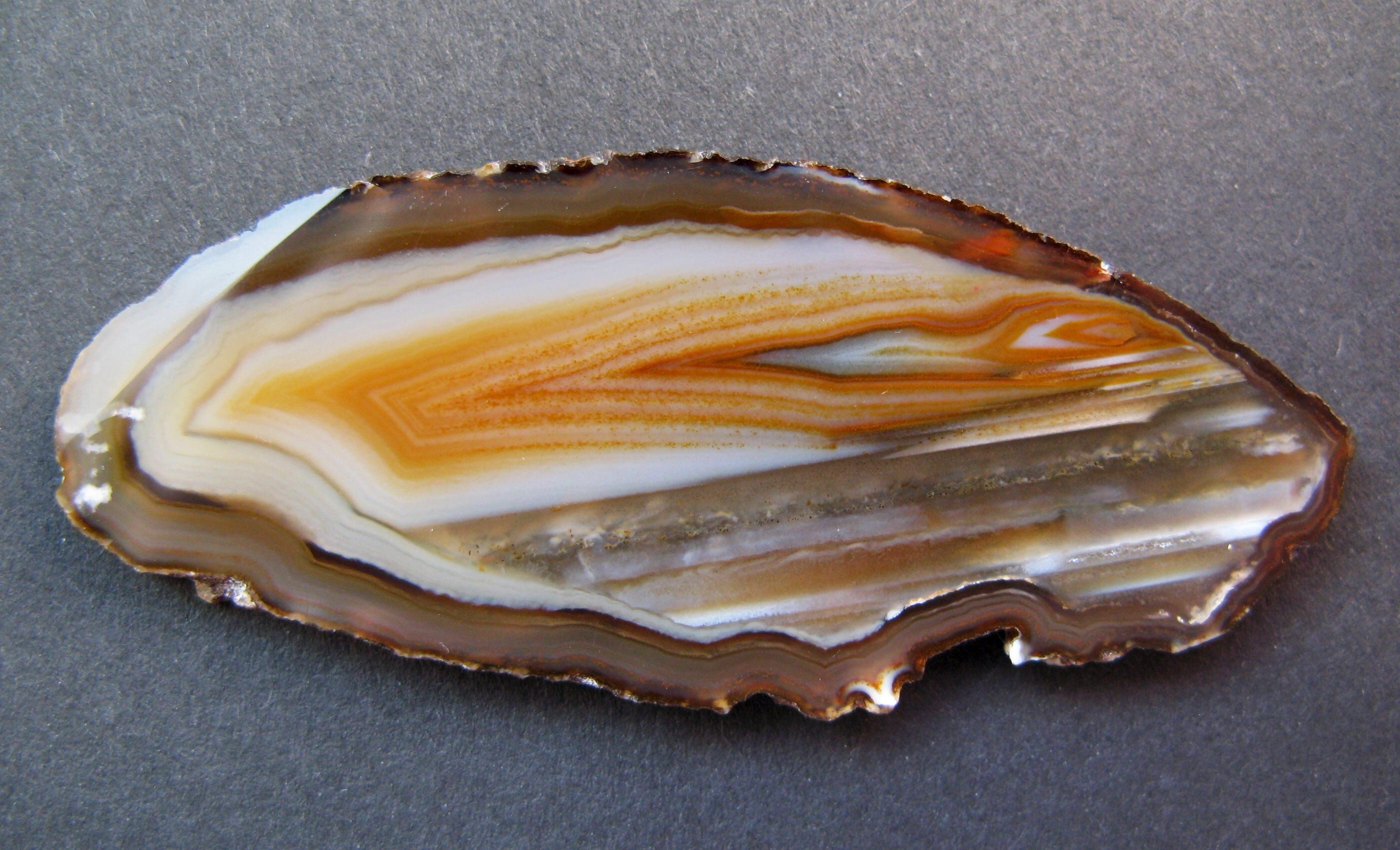
Agate

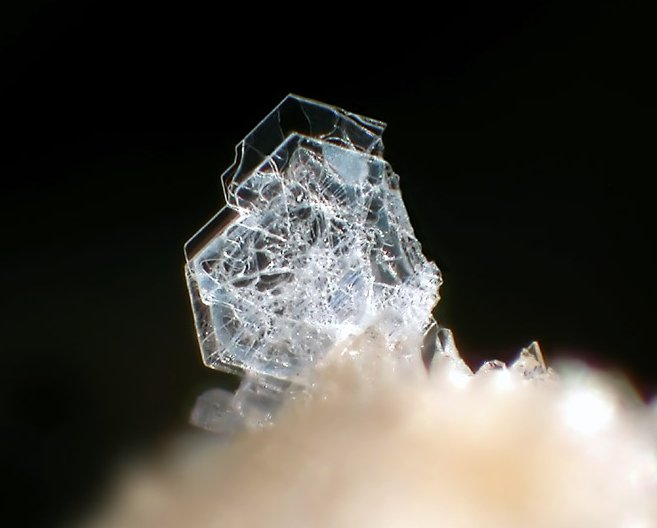
Tridymite

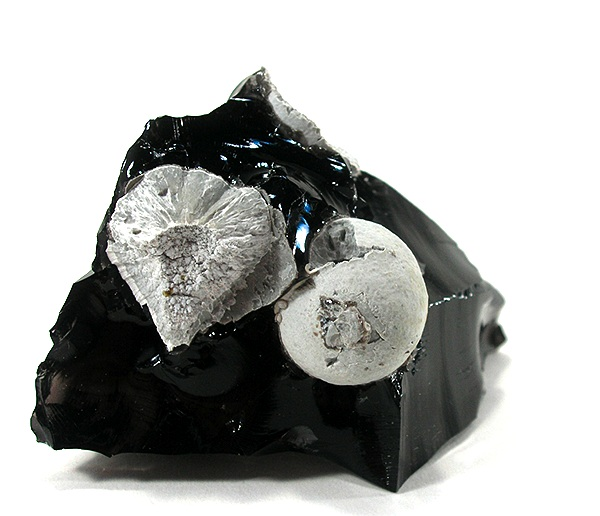
Cristobalite

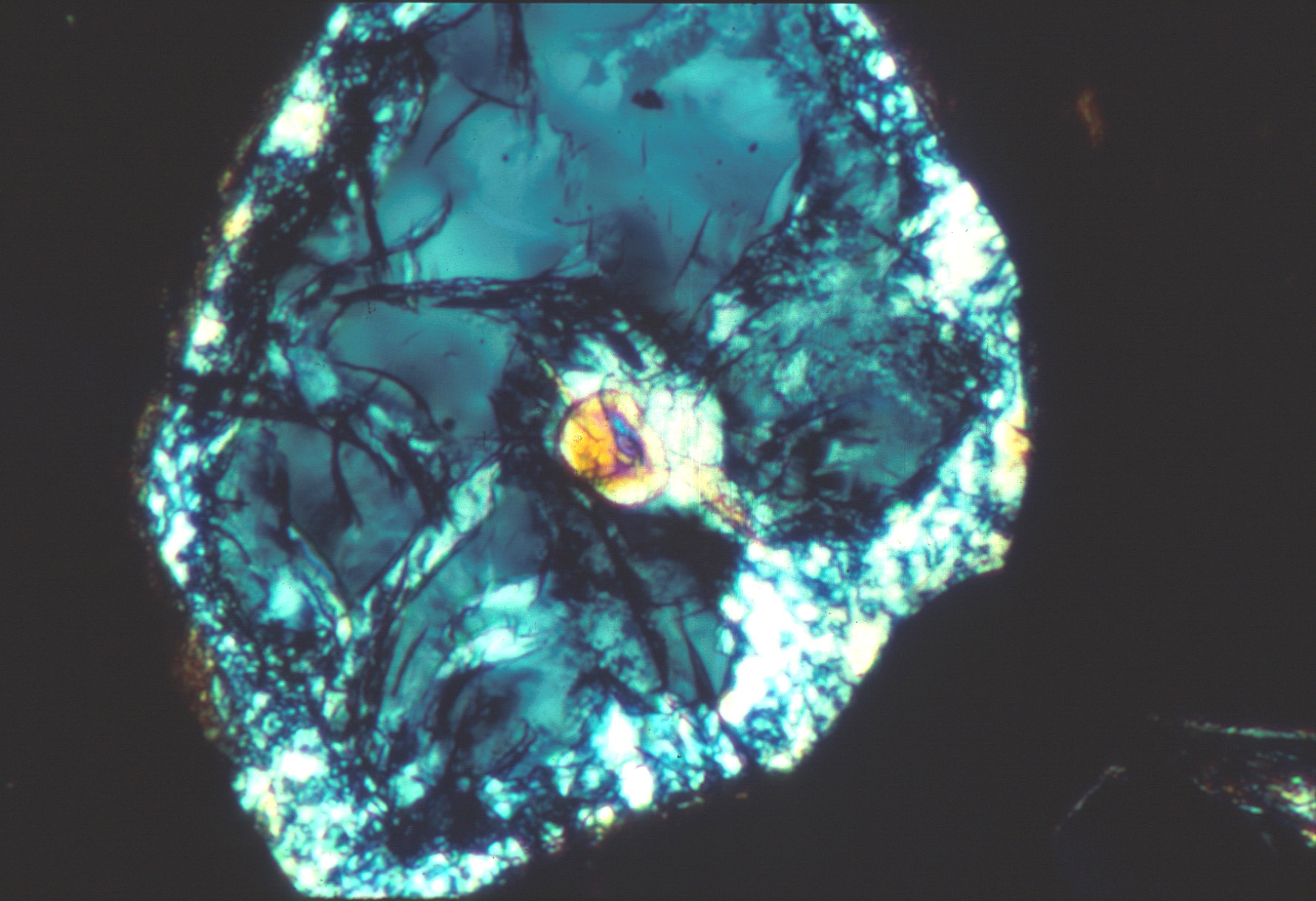
Coesite

Most crystalline forms of silica are made of infinite arrangements of SiO_{4} tetrahedra (with Si at the center) connected at their corners, with each oxygen atom linked to two silicon atoms. In the thermodynamically stable room-temperature form, α-quartz, these tetrahedra are linked in intertwined helical chains with two different Si–O distances (159.7 and 161.7 pm) with a Si–O–Si angle of 144°. These helices can be either left- or right-handed, so that individual α-quartz crystals are optically active. At 537 °C, this transforms quickly and reversibly into the similar β-quartz, with a change of the Si–O–Si angle to 155° but a retention of handedness. Further heating to 867 °C results in another reversible phase transition to β-tridymite, in which some Si–O bonds are broken to allow for the arrangement of the SiO_{4} tetrahedra into a more open and less dense hexagonal structure. This transition is slow and hence tridymite occurs as a metastable mineral even below this transition temperature; when cooled to about 120 °C it quickly and reversibly transforms by slight displacements of individual silicon and oxygen atoms to α-tridymite, similarly to the transition from α-quartz to β-quartz. β-tridymite slowly transforms to cubic β-cristobalite at about 1470 °C, which once again exists metastably below this transition temperature and transforms at 200–280 °C to α-cristobalite via small atomic displacements. β-cristobalite melts at 1713 °C; the freezing of silica from the melt is quite slow and vitrification, or the formation of a glass, is likely to occur instead. In vitreous silica, the SiO_{4} tetrahedra remain corner-connected, but the symmetry and periodicity of the crystalline forms are lost. Because of the slow conversions between these three forms, it is possible upon rapid heating to melt β-quartz (1550 °C) or β-tridymite (1703 °C). Silica boils at approximately 2800 °C. Other high-pressure forms of silica are known, such as coesite and stishovite: these are known in nature, formed under the shock pressure of a meteorite impact and then rapidly quenched to preserve the crystal structure. Similar melting and cooling of silica occurs following lightning strikes, forming glassy lechatelierite. W-silica is an unstable low-density form involving SiO_{4} tetrahedra sharing opposite edges instead of corners, forming parallel chains similarly to silicon disulfide (SiS_{2}) and silicon diselenide (SiSe_{2}): it quickly returns to forming amorphous silica with heat or traces of water.

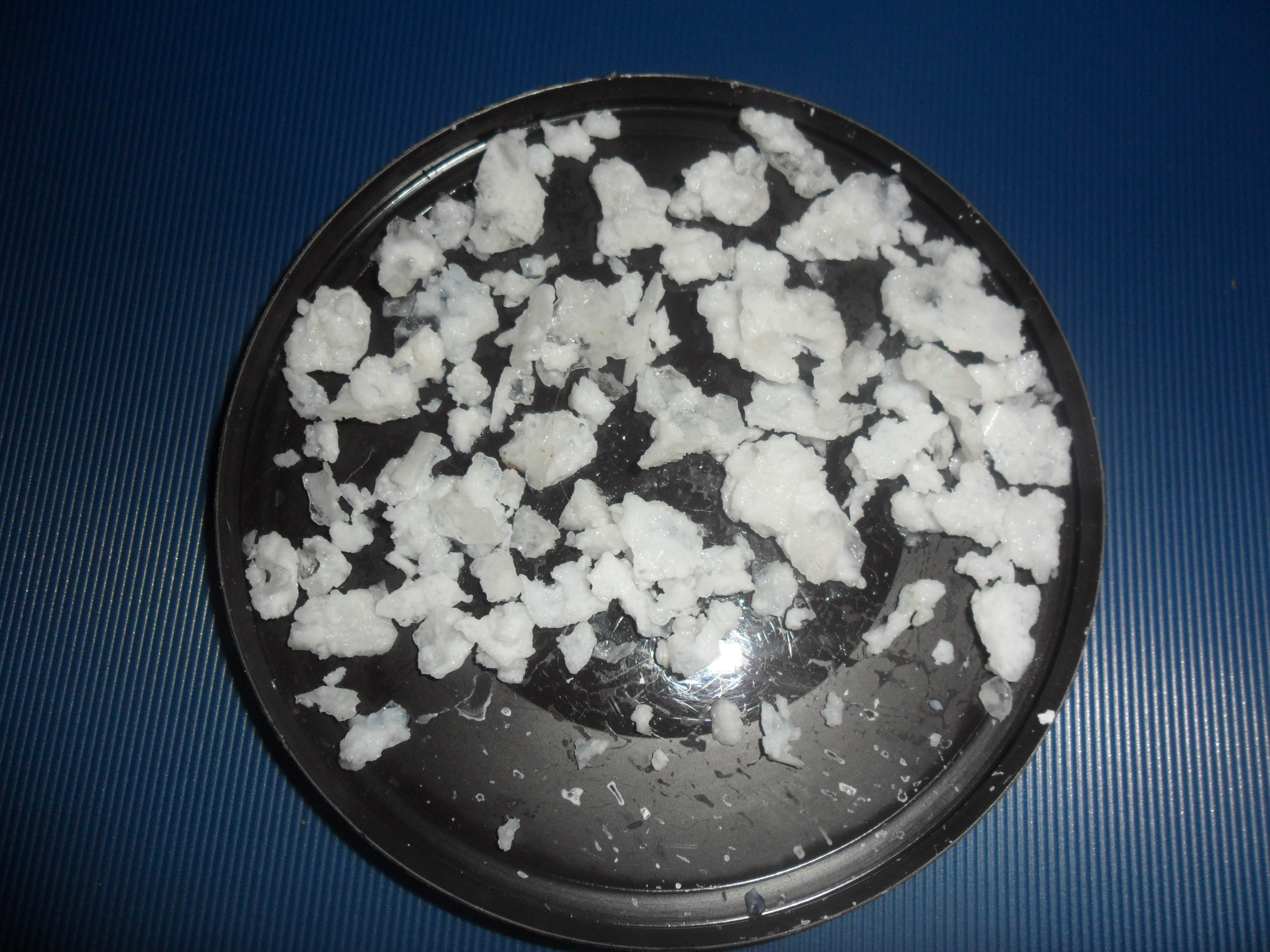
Condensed polysilicic acid

Silica is rather inert chemically. It is not attacked by any acids other than hydrofluoric acid. However, it slowly dissolves in hot concentrated alkalis, and does so rather quickly in fused metal hydroxides or carbonates, to give metal silicates. Among the elements, it is attacked only by fluorine at room temperature to form silicon tetrafluoride: hydrogen and carbon also react, but require temperatures over 1000 °C to do so. Silica nevertheless reacts with many metal and metalloid oxides to form a wide variety of compounds important in the glass and ceramic industries above all, but also have many other uses: for example, sodium silicate is often used in detergents due to its buffering, saponifying, and emulsifying properties.

== Silicic acids ==
Adding water to silica drops its melting point by around 800 °C due to the breaking of the structure by replacing Si–O–Si linkages with terminating Si–OH groups. Increasing water concentration results in the formation of hydrated silica gels and colloidal silica dispersions. Many hydrates and silicic acids exist in the most dilute of aqueous solutions, but these are rather insoluble and quickly precipitate and condense and cross-link to form various polysilicic acids of variable combinations following the formula [SiO_{x}(OH)_{4−2x}]_{n}, similar to the behaviour of boron, aluminium, and iron, among other elements. Hence, although some simple silicic acids have been identified in dilute solutions, such as orthosilicic acid Si(OH)_{4} and metasilicic acid SiO(OH)_{2}, none of these are likely to exist in the solid state.

== Silicate minerals ==
Typical coordination of metal cations in silicates (ionic radii in pm)
CN 4	Li^{I} (59)	Be^{II} (27)	Al^{III} (39)	Si^{IV} (26)	
CN 6	Na^{I} (102)	Mg^{II} (72)	Al^{III} (54)	Ti^{IV} (61)	Fe^{II} (78)
CN 8	K^{I} (151)	Ca^{II} (112)			
CN 12	K^{I} (164)				

About 95% of the Earth's crustal rocks are made of silica or silicate and aluminosilicate minerals, as reflected in oxygen, silicon, and aluminium being the three most common elements in the crust (in that order). Measured by mass, silicon makes up 27.7% of the Earth's crust. Pure silicon crystals are very rarely found in nature, but notable exceptions are crystals as large as 0.3 mm across found during sampling gases from the Kudriavy volcano on Iturup, one of the Kuril Islands.

Silicate and aluminosilicate minerals have many different structures and varying stoichiometry, but they may be classified following some general principles. Tetrahedral SiO_{4} units are common to almost all these compounds, either as discrete structures, or combined into larger units by the sharing of corner oxygen atoms. These may be divided into neso-silicates (discrete SiO_{4} units) sharing no oxygen atoms, soro-silicates (discrete Si_{2}O_{7} units) sharing one, cyclo-silicates (closed ring structures) and ino-silicates (continuous chain or ribbon structures) both sharing two, phyllo-silicates (continuous sheets) sharing three, and tecto-silicates (continuous three-dimensional frameworks) sharing four. The lattice of oxygen atoms that results is usually close-packed, or close to it, with the charge being balanced by other cations in various different polyhedral sites according to size.

The orthosilicates M^{II}_{2}SiO_{4} (M = Be, Mg, Mn, Fe, Zn) and ZrSiO_{4} are neso-silicates. Be_{2}SiO_{4} (phenacite) is unusual as both Be^{II} and Si^{IV} occupy tetrahedral four-coordinated sites; the other divalent cations instead occupy six-coordinated octahedral sites and often isomorphously replace each other as in olivine, (Mg,Fe,Mn)_{2}SiO_{4}. Zircon, ZrSiO_{4}, demands eight-coordination of the Zr^{IV} cations due to stoichiometry and because of their larger ionic radius (84 pm). Also significant are the garnets, [M^{II}_{3}M^{III}_{2}(SiO_{4})_{3}], in which the divalent cations (e.g. Ca, Mg, Fe) are eight-coordinated and the trivalent ones are six-coordinated (e.g. Al, Cr, Fe). Regular coordination is not always present: for example, it is not found in Ca_{2}SiO_{4}, which mixes six- and eight-coordinate sites for Ca^{II}. Soro-silicates, involving discrete double or triple tetrahedral units, are quite rare: metasilicates involving cyclic [(SiO^{n}_{3)}]^{2n−} units of corner-abutting tetrahedra forming a polygonal ring are also known.

Chain metasilicates, {SiO^{2−}_{3}}_{∞}, form by corner-sharing of an indefinite chain of linked SiO_{4} tetrahedra. Many differences arise due to the differing repeat distances of conformation across the line of tetrahedra. A repeat distance of two is most common, as in most pyroxene minerals, but repeat distances of one, three, four, five, six, seven, nine, and twelve are also known. These chains may then link across each other to form double chains and ribbons, as in the asbestos minerals, involving repeated chains of cyclic tetrahedron rings.

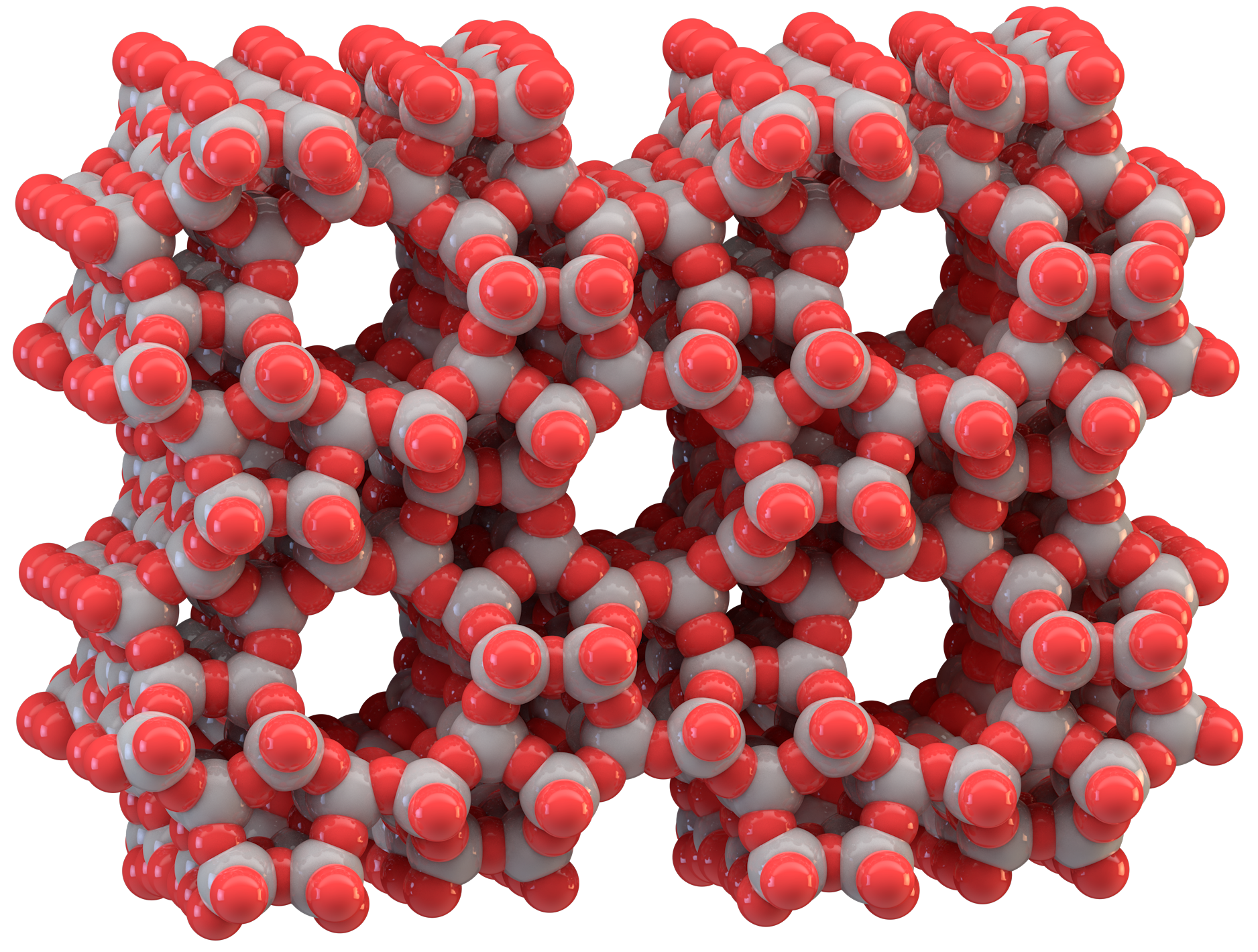
A typical zeolite structure

Layer silicates, such as the clay minerals and the micas, are very common, and often are formed by horizontal cross-linking of metasilicate chains or planar condensation of smaller units. An example is kaolinite [Al_{2}(OH)_{4}Si_{2}O_{5}]; in many of these minerals cation and anion replacement is common, so that for example tetrahedral Si^{IV} may be replaced by Al^{III}, octahedral Al^{III} by Mg^{II}, and OH^{−} by F^{−}. Three-dimensional framework aluminosilicates are structurally very complex; they may be conceived of as starting from the SiO_{2} structure, but having replaced up to one-half of the Si^{IV} atoms with Al^{III}, they require more cations to be included in the structure to balance charge. Examples include feldspars (the most abundant minerals on the Earth), zeolites, and ultramarines. Many feldspars can be thought of as forming part of the ternary system NaAlSi_{3}O_{8}–KAlSi_{3}O_{8}–CaAl_{2}Si_{2}O_{8}. Their lattice is destroyed by high pressure prompting Al^{III} to undergo six-coordination rather than four-coordination, and this reaction destroying feldspars may be a reason for the Mohorovičić discontinuity, which would imply that the crust and mantle have the same chemical composition, but different lattices, although this is not a universally held view. Zeolites have many polyhedral cavities in their frameworks (truncated cuboctahedra being most common, but other polyhedra also are known as zeolite cavities), allowing them to include loosely bound molecules such as water in their structure. Ultramarines alternate silicon and aluminium atoms and include a variety of other anions such as Cl^{−}, SO^{2−}_{4}, and S^{2−}_{2}, but are otherwise similar to the feldspars.

== Other inorganic compounds ==
Silicon disulfide (SiS_{2}) is formed by burning silicon in gaseous sulfur at 100 °C; sublimation of the resulting compound in nitrogen results in white, flexible long fibers reminiscent of asbestos with a structure similar to W-silica. This melts at 1090 °C and sublimes at 1250 °C; at high temperature and pressure this transforms to a crystal structure analogous to cristobalite. However, SiS_{2} lacks the variety of structures of SiO_{2}, and quickly hydrolyses to silica and hydrogen sulfide. It is also ammonolysed quickly and completely by liquid ammonia as follows to form an imide:

SiS_{2} + 4 NH_{3} → Si(NH)_{2} + 2 NH_{4}SH

It reacts with the sulfides of sodium, magnesium, aluminium, and iron to form metal thiosilicates: reaction with ethanol results in tetraethylsilicate Si(OEt)_{4} and hydrogen sulfide. Ethylsilicate is useful as its controlled hydrolysis produces adhesive or film-like forms of silica. Reacting hydrogen sulfide with silicon tetrahalides yields silicon thiohalides such as S(SiCl)_{3}, cyclic Cl_{2}Si(μ-S)_{2}SiCl_{2}, and crystalline (SiSCl_{2})_{4}. Despite the double bond rule, stable organosilanethiones RR'Si=S have been made thanks to the stabilising mechanism of intermolecular coordination via an amine group.

Silicon nitride, Si_{3}N_{4}, may be formed by directly reacting silicon with nitrogen above 1300 °C, but a more economical means of production is by heating silica and coke in a stream of nitrogen and hydrogen gas at 1500 °C. It would make a promising ceramic if not for the difficulty of working with and sintering it: chemically, it is near-totally inert, and even above 1000 °C it keeps its strength, shape, and continues to be resistant to wear and corrosion. It is very hard (9 on the Mohs hardness scale), dissociates only at 1900 °C at 1 atm, and is quite dense (density 3.185 g/cm^{3}), because of its compact structure similar to that of phenacite (Be_{2}SiO_{4}). A similar refractory material is Si_{2}N_{2}O, formed by heating silicon and silica at 1450 °C in an argon stream containing 5% nitrogen gas, involving 4-coordinate silicon and 3-coordinate nitrogen alternating in puckered hexagonal tilings interlinked by non-linear Si–O–Si linkages to each other.

Reacting silyl halides with ammonia or alkylammonia derivatives in the gaseous phase or in ethanolic solution produces various volatile silylamides, which are silicon analogues of the amines:

3 SiH_{3}Cl + 4 NH_{3} → N(SiH_{3})_{3} + 3 NH_{4}Cl
SiH_{3}Br + 2 Me_{2}NH → SiH_{3}NMe_{2} + Me_{2}NH_{2}Br
4 SiH_{3}I + 5 N_{2}H_{4} → (SiH_{3})_{2}NN(SiH_{3})_{2} + 4 N_{2}H_{5}I

Many such compounds have been prepared, the only known restriction being that the nitrogen is always tertiary, and species containing the SiH–NH group are unstable at room temperature. The stoichiometry around the nitrogen atom in compounds such as N(SiH_{3})_{3} is planar. Similarly, trisilylamines are weaker as ligands than their carbon analogues, the tertiary amines, although substitution of some SiH_{3} groups by CH_{3} groups mitigates this weakness. For example, N(SiH_{3})_{3} does not form an adduct with BH_{3} at all, while MeN(SiH_{3})_{2} and Me_{2}NSiH_{3} form adducts at low temperatures that decompose upon warming. Some silicon analogues of imines, with a Si=N double bond, are known: the first found was Bu^{t}_{2}Si=N–SiBu^{t}_{3}, which was discovered in 1986.

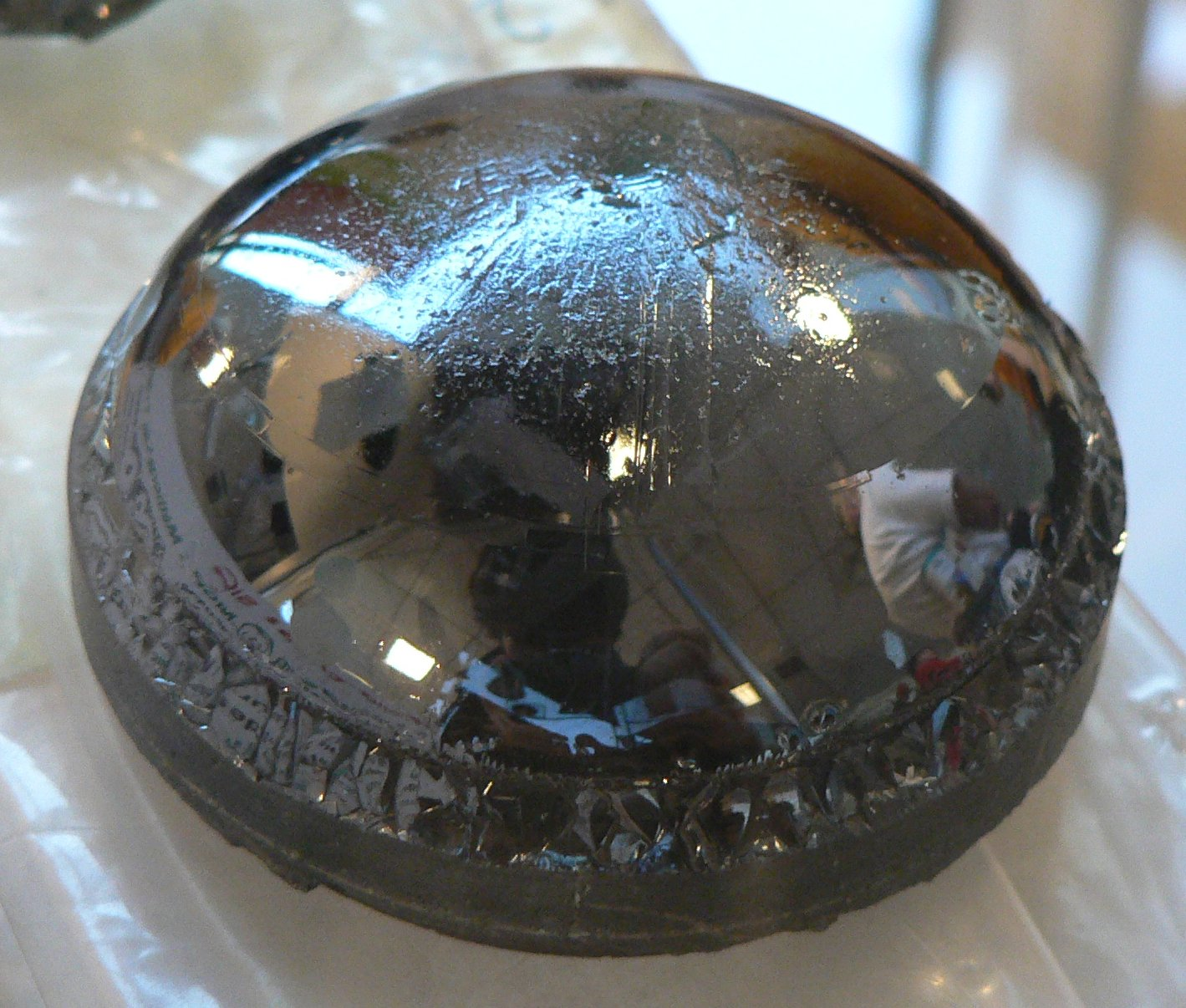
Silicon carbide

Silicon carbide (SiC) was first made by Edward Goodrich Acheson in 1891, who named it carborundum to reference its intermediate hardness and abrasive power between diamond (an allotrope of carbon) and corundum (aluminium oxide). He soon founded a company to manufacture it, and today about one million tonnes are produced each year. Silicon carbide exists in about 250 crystalline forms. The polymorphism of SiC is characterized by a large family of similar crystalline structures called polytypes. They are variations of the same chemical compound that are identical in two dimensions and differ in the third. Thus they can be viewed as layers stacked in a certain sequence. It is made industrially by reduction of quartz sand with excess coke or anthracite at 2000–2500 °C in an electric furnace:

SiO_{2} + 2 C → Si + 2 CO
Si + C → SiC

It is the most thermally stable binary silicon compound, only decomposing through loss of silicon starting from around 2700 °C. It is resistant to most aqueous acids, phosphoric acid being an exception. It forms a protective layer of silicon dioxide on the surface and hence only oxidises appreciably in air above 1000 °C; removal of this layer by molten hydroxides or carbonates leads to quick oxidation. Silicon carbide is rapidly attacked by chlorine gas, which forms SiCl_{4} and carbon at 100 °C and SiCl_{4} and CCl_{4} at 1000 °C. It is mostly used as an abrasive and a refractory material, as it is chemically stable and very strong, and it fractures to form a very sharp cutting edge. It is also useful as an intrinsic semiconductor, as well as an extrinsic semiconductor upon being doped. In its diamond-like behavior it serves as an illustration of the chemical similarity between carbon and silicon.

== Organosilicon compounds ==
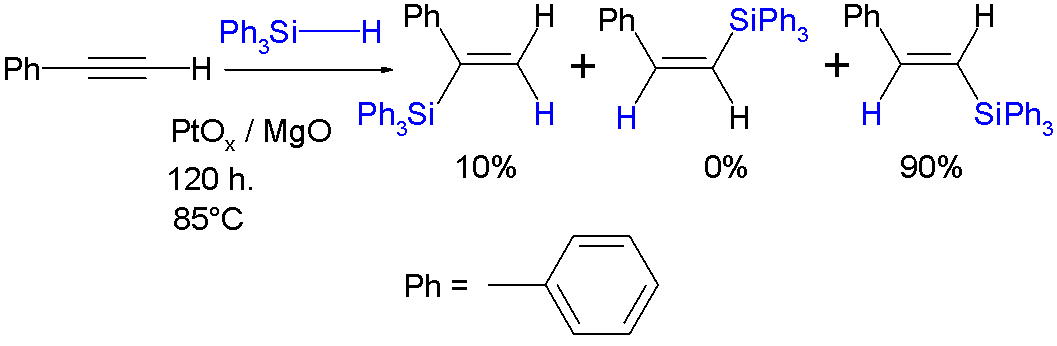
A hydrosilylation reaction, in which Si–H is added to an unsaturated substrate

Because the Si–C bond is close in strength to the C–C bond, organosilicon compounds tend to be markedly thermally and chemically stable. For example, tetraphenylsilane (SiPh_{4}) may be distilled in air even at its boiling point of 428 °C, and so may its substituted derivatives Ph_{3}SiCl and Ph_{2}SiCl_{2}, which boil at 378 °C and 305 °C respectively. Furthermore, since carbon and silicon are chemical congeners, organosilicon chemistry shows some significant similarities with carbon chemistry, for example in the propensity of such compounds for catenation and forming multiple bonds. However, significant differences also arise: since silicon is more electropositive than carbon, bonds to more electronegative elements are generally stronger with silicon than with carbon, and vice versa. Thus the Si–F bond is significantly stronger than even the C–F bond and is one of the strongest single bonds, while the Si–H bond is much weaker than the C–H bond and is readily broken. Furthermore, the ability of silicon to expand its octet is not shared by carbon, and hence some organosilicon reactions have no organic analogues. For example, nucleophilic attack on silicon does not proceed by the S_{N}2 or S_{N}1 processes, but instead goes through a negatively charged true pentacoordinate intermediate and appears like a substitution at a hindered tertiary atom. This works for silicon, unlike for carbon, because the long Si–C bonds reduce the steric hindrance and there are no geometric constraints for nucleophilic attack, unlike for example a C–O σ* antibonding orbital. Nevertheless, despite these differences, the mechanism is still often called "S_{N}2 at silicon" for simplicity.

One of the most useful silicon-containing groups is trimethylsilyl, Me_{3}Si–. The Si–C bond connecting it to the rest of the molecule is reasonably strong, allowing it to remain while the rest of the molecule undergoes reactions, but is not so strong that it cannot be removed specifically when needed, for example by the fluoride ion, which is a very weak nucleophile for carbon compounds but a very strong one for organosilicon compounds. It may be compared to acidic protons; while trimethylsilyl is removed by hard nucleophiles instead of bases, both removals usually promote elimination. As a general rule, while saturated carbon is best attacked by nucleophiles that are neutral compounds, those based on nonmetals far down on the periodic table (e.g. sulfur, selenium, or iodine), or even both, silicon is best attacked by charged nucleophiles, particularly those involving such highly electronegative nonmetals as oxygen, fluorine, or chlorine. For example, enolates react at the carbon in haloalkanes, but at the oxygen in silyl chlorides; and when trimethylsilyl is removed from an organic molecule using hydroxide as a nucleophile, the product of the reaction is not the silanol as one would expect from using carbon chemistry as an analogy, because the siloxide is strongly nucleophilic and attacks the original molecule to yield the silyl ether hexamethyldisiloxane, (Me_{3}Si)_{2}O. Conversely, while the S_{N}2 reaction is mostly unaffected by the presence of a partial positive charge (δ+) at the carbon, the analogous "S_{N}2" reaction at silicon is so affected. Thus, for example, the silyl triflates are so electrophilic that they react 10^{8} to 10^{9} times faster than silyl chlorides with oxygen-containing nucleophiles. Trimethylsilyl triflate is in particular a very good Lewis acid and is used to convert carbonyl compounds to acetals and silyl enol ethers, reacting them together analogously to the aldol reaction.

Si–C bonds are commonly formed in three ways. In the laboratory, preparation is often carried out in small quantities by reacting tetrachlorosilane (silicon tetrachloride) with organolithium, Grignard, or organoaluminium reagents, or by catalytic addition of Si–H across C=C double bonds. The second route has the drawback of not being applicable to the most important silanes, the methyl and phenyl silanes. Organosilanes are made industrially by directly reacting alkyl or aryl halides with silicon with 10% by weight metallic copper as a catalyst. Standard organic reactions suffice to produce many derivatives; the resulting organosilanes are often significantly more reactive than their carbon congeners, readily undergoing hydrolysis, ammonolysis, alcoholysis, and condensation to form cyclic oligomers or linear polymers.

=== Silicone polymers ===
Structure of polydimethylsiloxane, the principal component of silicones

The word "silicone" was first used by Frederic Kipping in 1901. He invented the word to illustrate the similarity of chemical formulae between Ph_{2}SiO and benzophenone, Ph_{2}CO, although he also stressed the lack of chemical resemblance due to the polymeric structure of Ph_{2}SiO, which is not shared by Ph_{2}CO.

Silicones may be considered analogous to mineral silicates, in which the methyl groups of the silicones correspond to the isoelectronic <O^{−} of the silicates. They are quite stable to extreme temperatures, oxidation, and water, and have useful dielectric, antistick, and antifoam properties. Furthermore, they are resistant over long periods of time to ultraviolet radiation and weathering, and are inert physiologically. They are fairly unreactive, but do react with concentrated solutions bearing the hydroxide ion and fluorinating agents, and occasionally, may even be used as mild reagents for selective syntheses. For example, (Me_{3}Si)_{2}O is valuable for the preparation of derivatives of molybdenum and tungsten oxyhalides, converting a tungsten hexachloride suspension in dichloroethane solution quantitatively to WOCl_{4} in under an hour at room temperature, and then to yellow WO_{2}Cl_{2} at 100 °C in light petroleum at a yield of 95% overnight.

== Bibliography ==
- Greenwood, Norman N.; Earnshaw, Alan (1997). Chemistry of the Elements (2nd ed.). Butterworth-Heinemann. doi:10.1016/C2009-0-30414-6. ISBN 978-0-08-037941-8.
- King, R. Bruce (1995). Inorganic Chemistry of Main Group Elements. Wiley-VCH. ISBN 978-0-471-18602-1.
