= Silicon tetraiodide =

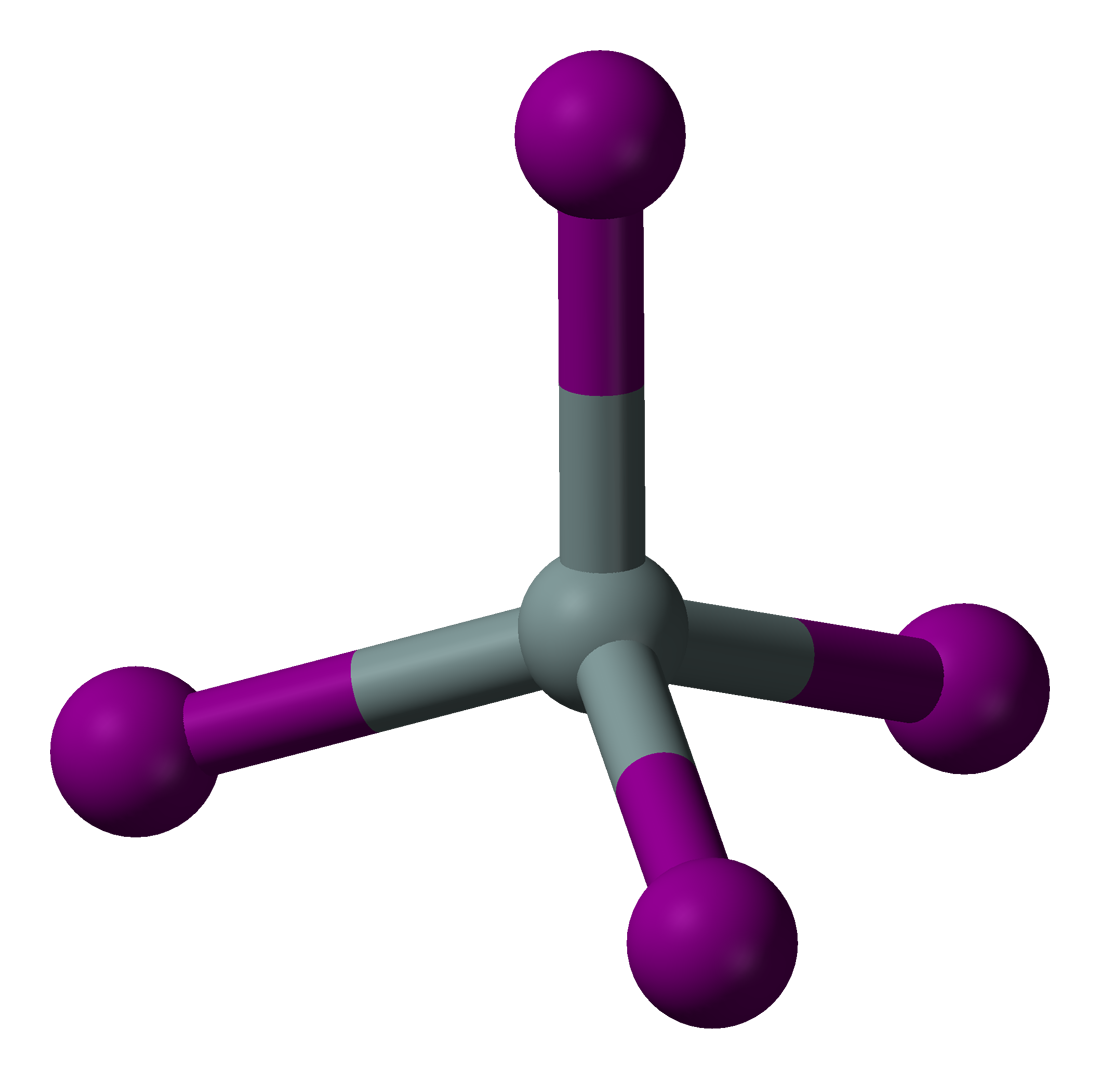

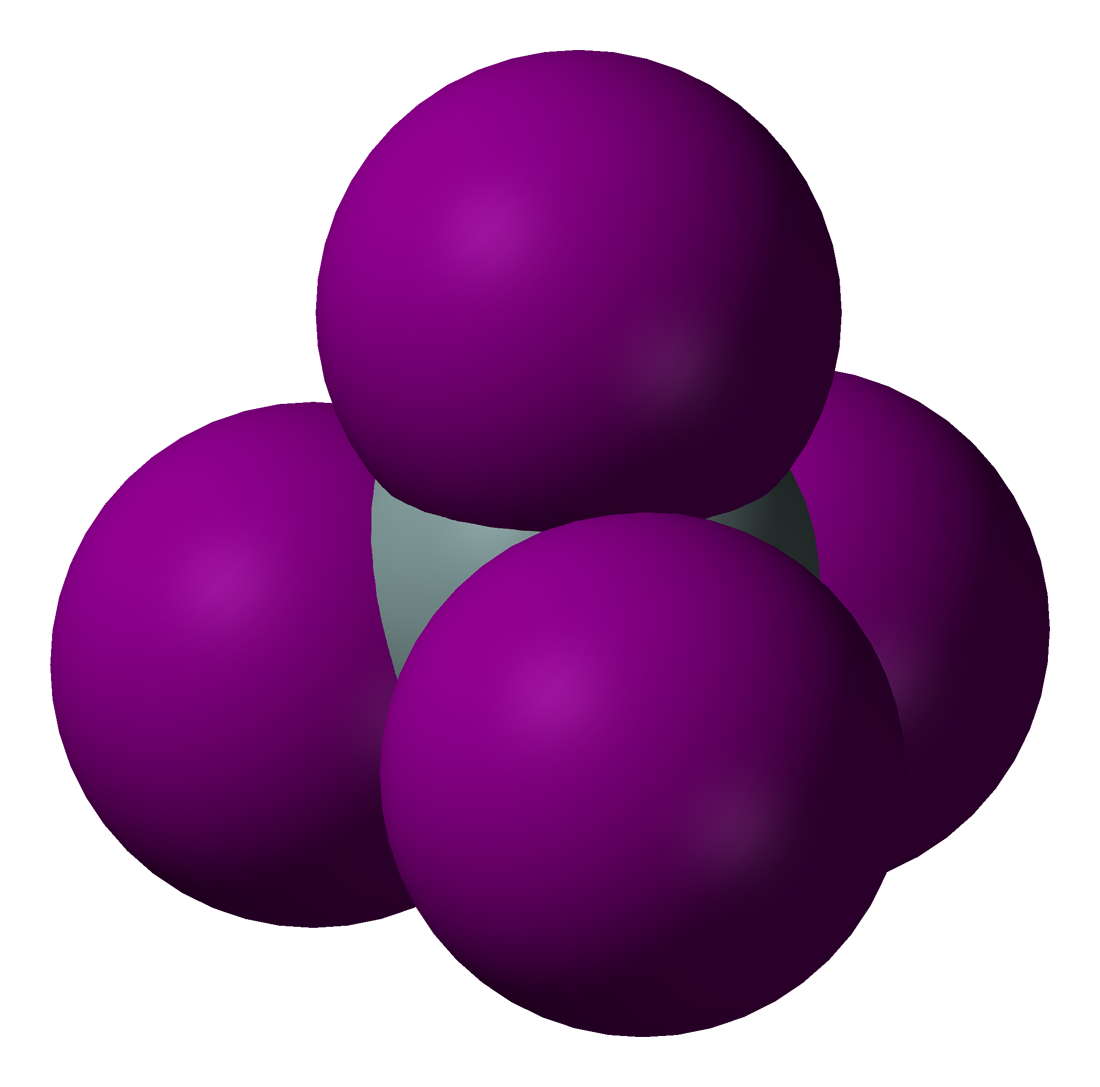

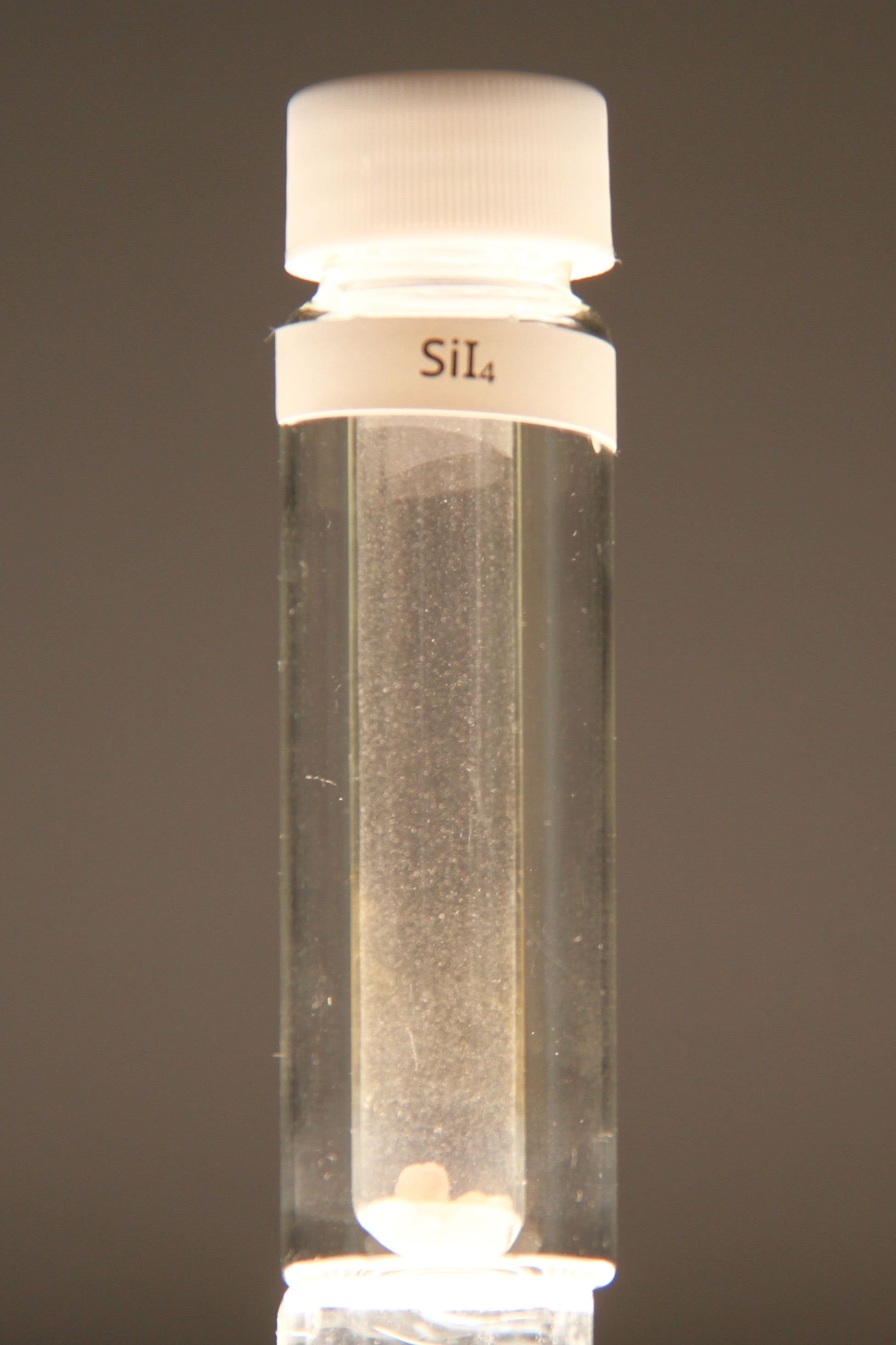

Names
- Other names silicon tetraiodide Tetraiodosilane

Identifiers
CAS Number	13465-84-4
3D model (JSmol)	Interactive image
ChemSpider	75335
ECHA InfoCard	100.033.355
EC Number	236-706-2
PubChem CID	83498
CompTox Dashboard (EPA)	DTXSID5065489
- InChI: InChI=1S/I4Si/c1-5(2,3)4 Key: CFTHARXEQHJSEH-UHFFFAOYSA-N; InChI=1/I4Si/c1-5(2,3)4 Key: CFTHARXEQHJSEH-UHFFFAOYAL
- SMILES: I[Si](I)(I)I

Properties
Chemical formula	SiI_{4}
Molar mass	535.7034 g/mol
Appearance	white powder
Density	4.198 g/cm^{3}
Melting point	120.5 °C (248.9 °F; 393.6 K)
Boiling point	287.4 °C (549.3 °F; 560.5 K)
Solubility in water	reacts
Solubility in organic solvents	soluble

Structure
Molecular shape	tetrahedral

Hazards
- GHS labelling
Pictograms	(GHS05: Corrosive) (GHS06: Toxic) (GHS07: Exclamation mark) (GHS08: Health hazard)
Signal word	Danger
Hazard statements	H301, H311, H314, H317, H334, H360
Precautionary statements	P201, P202, P260, P264, P270, P272, P280, P281, P285, P301+P310, P301+P330+P331, P302+P352, P303+P361+P353, P304+P340, P304+P341, P305+P351+P338, P308+P313, P310, P312, P321, P322, P330, P333+P313, P342+P311, P361, P363, P405, P501
NFPA 704 (fire diamond)	2 0 0

Related compounds
Other anions	Silicon tetrafluoride Silicon tetrachloride Silicon tetrabromide
Other cations	Carbon tetraiodide Germanium tetraiodide Tin(IV) iodide
- Except where otherwise noted, data are given for materials in their standard state (at 25 °C [77 °F], 100 kPa). verify (what is ?) Infobox references

Silicon tetraiodide is the chemical compound with the formula SiI_{4}. It is a tetrahedral molecule with Si-I bond lengths of 2.432(5) Å.

SiI_{4} is a precursor to silicon amides of the formula Si(NR_{2})_{4} (R = alkyl). It has also been of interest in the manufacture and etching of silicon in microelectronics.

== Synthesis and reactions ==
This compound is produced by treating silicon-copper mixture with iodine:

Si + I_{2} → SiI_{4}

It reacts quickly with water and moisture in the air.

It can also be made on a large scale by reaction of silicon or silicon carbide with iodine on heating to about 200 °C. Of more academic interest is the reaction of silane with iodine vapour at 130 - 150 °C, as this produces a series of compounds ranging from iodosilane SiH_{3}I to diiodosilane SiH_{2}I_{2} and triiodosilane SiHI_{3} as well. These compounds are colourless liquids at room temperature. The last one can be readily distinguished from the similar carbon compound, iodoform which is a yellow solid at room temperature.

== Comparison with other SiX_{4} compounds ==
	SiH_{4}	SiF_{4}	SiCl_{4}	SiBr_{4}	SiI_{4}
b.p. (˚C)	−111.9	−90.3	56.8	155.0	290.0
m.p. (˚C)	−185	−95.0	−68.8	5.0	155.0
Si-X bond length (Å)	>0.74	1.55	2.02	2.20	2.43
Si-X bond energy (kJ/mol)	384	582	391	310	234
