= Penilaian Menengah Rendah =

Public school examination in Malaysia abolished in 2014

Penilaian Menengah Rendah (PMR; Malay, 'Lower Secondary Assessment') was a Malaysian public examination targeting Malaysian adolescents and young adults between the ages of 13 and 30 years, taken by all Form Three high school and college students in both government and private schools throughout the country from independence in 1957 to 2013. It was formerly known as Sijil Rendah Pelajaran (SRP; Malay, 'Lower Certificate of Education'). It was set and examined by the Malaysian Examinations Syndicate (Lembaga Peperiksaan Malaysia), an agency under the Ministry of Education.

This standardised examination was held annually during the first or second week of October. The passing grade depended on the average scores obtained by the candidates who sat for the examination.

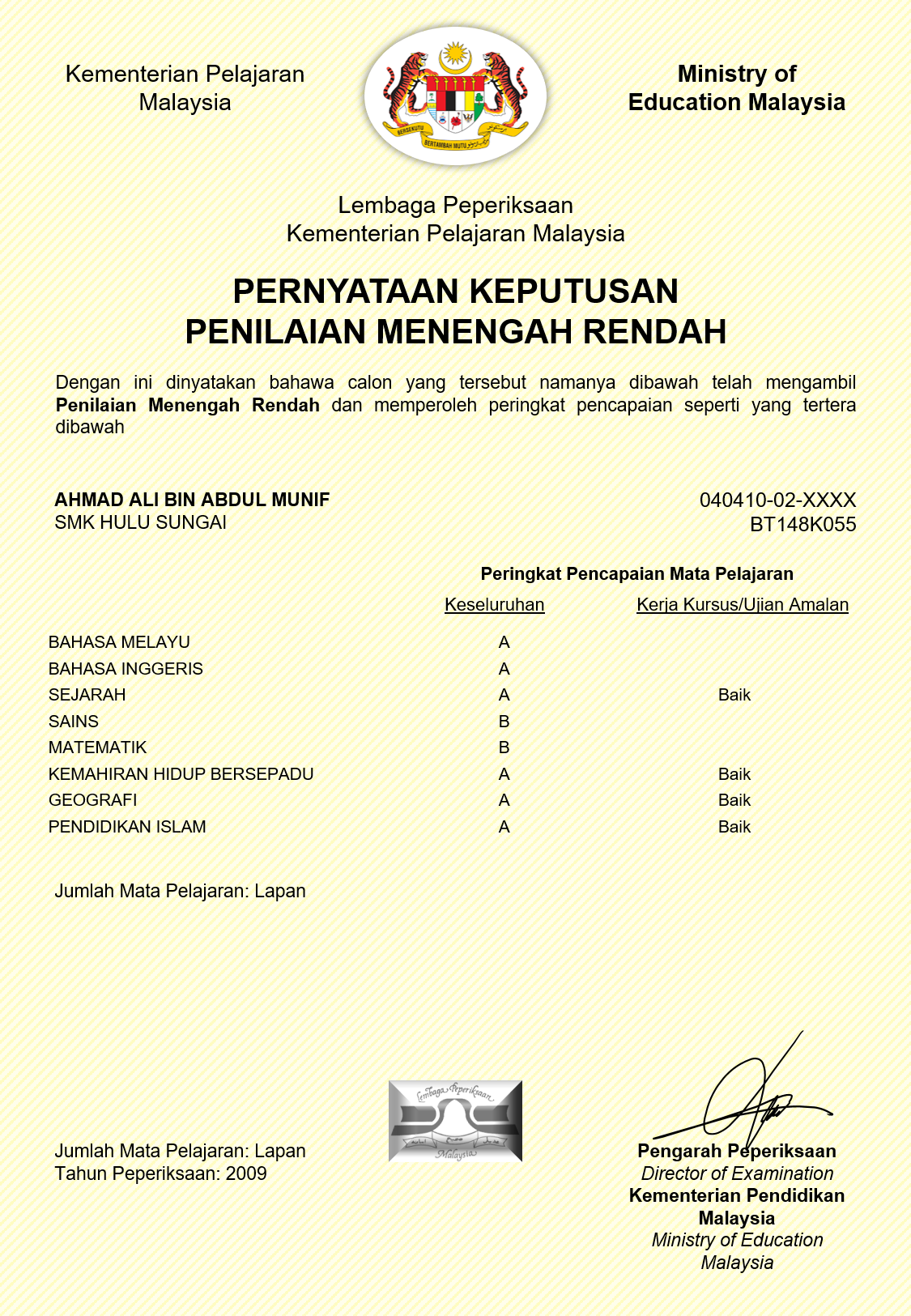
Mock Result Statement Certificate for Lower-Secondary Assessment (PMR) in Malaysia. The certificate was handed out by the Lembaga Peperiksaan Malaysia

PMR was abolished in 2014 and has since replaced by high school and college-based Form Three Assessment (PT3; Penilaian Tingkatan 3).

Prior to its abolition in 2014, all PMR examination papers were considered official confidential property and were protected under the Official Secrets Act 1972 of Malaysia.

== Subjects ==
The mandatory or core subjects that were taken in this exam are:

- Malay language (Bahasa Malaysia)
- English language
- Mathematics
- Science
- Geography
- History
- Living Skills (Kemahiran Hidup Bersepadu)
- Islamic Studies (mandatory for Muslim students, optional for others)

Optional subjects are:

- Arabic language (اللغة العربية)
- Basic Arab communication
- Chinese language (华文)
- Iban language (jaku Iban)
- Kadazandusun language (Boros Momogun) (From 2009)
- Punjabi language (ਪੰਜਾਬੀ)
- Tamil language (தமிழ்மொழி)

=== Malay language (Bahasa Melayu) ===
The Malay language was a mandatory subject, and continues to be so in the exam's successor, the PT3. Before the PMR examination in October, there were oral examinations and a listening comprehension examination which were counted for the actual PMR examination. These examinations were taken three times throughout Form 3, with the best results being selected as a final grade in the PMR examination. The Malay language examination consisted of two papers, that were Paper One, and Paper Two.

In Paper One, 40 multiple choice questions were given to test the student's comprehension of the written language being tested, and lasted for typically one hour. Paper One was usually tougher, with results above 30 considered distinctive.

Paper Two comprised four sections and was two hours long. For the first section, the candidates were required to write a summary based on the passage given, which also contained three comprehension questions on the same passage. For the second section, the candidates were expected to write an essay of not more than 120 words based on visual aids (such as graphs, charts, images, multiple images, tables and cartoons) that were provided to candidates. For the third section, candidates had to write an essay on one of five topics given to them. The composition must have contained more than 180 words, and carried the most number of marks. For the fourth and final section of the second paper, the candidates had to write a description for any one of the three novels studied by them in lower secondary school based on the instructions given. The questions asked differed from year to year.

=== English language ===
Similar in format to the Malay language exam, the English language exam usually had an oral component, which assessed the students' proficiency in speaking the language, a listening comprehension examination, testing the students' ability to comprehend speech in daily situations, an examination to test the student's composition skills, and finally an examination testing the student's knowledge in grammar and vocabulary.

Oral and listening examination

The oral and listening comprehension examination was taken before the PMR, which would contribute marks to the actual PMR examination. The oral examination was taken 3 times throughout the year with the best results selected for the PMR examination. The oral and listening comprehension examination were usually taken together. This examination for the English language usually lasts about 10 to 15 minutes per student. The maximum score for this examination is 40. The oral examination is divided into 2 sections. The first section was to interpret an illustration given as thoroughly and detailed as possible, and give comments about their actions in a formal way and predict the outcome of such a situation, this being graded on a score of 10. It was advised that students did not point to the picture. No names were to be given and everything was to be said in present tense. The next section was to give a speech in front of a class. This part of the examination was different for each of the 3 oral examination per year. For the first oral examination, this part of the test required the student to present an impromptu speech based on a topic given for more than 3 minutes. For the second oral examination, this part of the test required the student to memorise a passage and present it in front of the class as interestingly as possible for about 5 minutes. For final oral examination, this part required 2 students to strike a conversation in front of the class for about 5 minutes which is relevant to the topic given. The maximum score for this part of the oral test is 10. The final section of the English oral examination requires the student to answer questions spontaneously asked of the examiners related to the previous 2 sections, which often required their opinion and inference, this being graded on a score of 10.

The listening comprehension examination followed once the oral examination had finished for the particular class. This examination would then test the students' ability to comprehend the spoken English language in various daily situations. This examination required the student to answer subjective questions which was based on the information contained in the audio played to the students. This examination provided the final 10 marks.

Written examination

For the first paper of the English exam, students were required to answer 40 multiple choice questions in the course of an hour. Questions based on grammar, vocabulary, phrases and idioms were tested. Students were also required to interpret information based on graphical stimuli such as statistical charts, memos, signs, short texts, notices and pictures. A rational cloze passage with a total of 10 questions was provided to the student; the passage tests grammar and vocabulary specifically. There was also a section which tested the student's knowledge in English literature, such as poems, short stories and novels studied throughout the lower secondary English lessons.

For Paper 2, students were required to write a long essay and a summary, as well as to answer a literature component. Section A, guided writing, tested the student's ability in functional or situational writing. If a functional writing question is provided, students were required to write an informal or formal letter. If a situational writing question was provided, students were required to write an essay in the form of a narrative or third person drama. Generally, this part of Paper 2 was tough and difficult to score. Section B of Paper 2 required students to write a summary based on a passage given. The final section of Paper 2 was the literature component, where students were required to write an essay based on their knowledge in the novels studied in Form 3. The novels being tested in the literature component include How I Met Myself, The Railway Children and Around the World in 80 Days. The time limit for this paper is 1 hour and 30 minutes.

Effective 1 January 2012, the new format set by the Ministry of Education Malaysia prior to the abolition of the exam in 2014 was as follows:

Section A : Guided Writing (Remains the Same) Marks: 25 marks (Reduced from 30 marks)

Section B : Literature (Section changed from Section C to Section B). Two (2) questions: Question 1 : Poem, short stories & drama Marks: 3 marks Question 2 : Novel Marks: 12 marks (Increased from 10 marks)

Section C : Summary (Section changed from Section B to Section C) Marks: 10 marks (Unchanged)

=== Mathematics ===
The mathematics examination in PMR was divided into two papers, that is, Mathematics Paper 1 and Mathematics Paper 2. Paper 1 consisted of 40 multiple choice questions and is worth 40 marks. The time limit for this paper was 1 hour and 15 minutes. This had prompted complaints from students and parents about the very short timeframe for completion and its difficulty. Students usually score lower than average for Paper 1, with scores above 30 being distinctive. The usage of a scientific or four operation calculator was allowed for this paper from 2003 onwards. Programmable calculators were not allowed.

Mathematics Paper 2 required open-ended input, and comprises 20 questions in increasing difficulty. This paper was worth 60 marks. Marks for each answer ranges from 1–6, depending on the complexity of the question. The time limit for this paper was 1 hour and 45 minutes. The usage of calculators regardless of type were prohibited for this paper.

For both papers, the questions were usually in the form of:

- Whole numbers
- Real numbers
- Fractions and decimals
- Approximation and estimation
- Number patterns and sequences
- Basic mensuration
- Percentages
- Financial mathematics
- Lines and angles
- Bearing
- Squares, square roots, cubes and cube roots
- Indices
- Surds
- Polygons
- Statistics
- Pythagoras' theorem
- Perimeter and area
- Volume and surface area
- Ratio and proportion
- Rates
- Coordinates
- Linear, simultaneous and quadratic equations
- Linear inequalities
- Algebraic expression, Algebraic formulae and manipulation
- Plane and solid geometry
- Circles
- Arc length and circular sector area
- Transformations
- Geometrical constructions and loci in two dimensions
- Scale drawings
- Graphs of functions
- Trigonometry

=== Science ===
The science examination in PMR was also divided into 2 papers, that was Science Paper 1 and Science Paper 2. Paper 1 consisted of 40 multiple choice questions in escalating difficulty and was worth 40 marks. The time limit for this paper was 1 hour. The Science Paper 1, similar to Mathematics Paper 1, is usually very tough to score above 30. The usage of calculators for this paper was allowed, as this was to assist the students answer physics-based questions.

Science Paper 2, similar to Mathematics Paper 2, required open-ended input. This paper consisted of 8 to 10 subjective questions. The marks allocated for the questions in Paper 2 varied from 1 mark to 6 marks, each measured proficiency in several units of the science syllabus, with a total of 60 marks. The time limit for this paper was 1 hour and 30 minutes and the usage of calculators was not allowed. The last 2 questions were usually experimental ones, which required the student to formulate a hypothesis, determine the variables of the experiment and tabulate the data for the experiment. The marks allocated for this section of Paper 2 were usually more because it required the student to explain further based on their knowledge in science. The syllabus covers various aspects of chemistry, biology and physics. These distinctions into different fields are not made in the examination format but can be derived based on the different themes:

Chemistry

- Matter and materials science. Chemical and physical properties. The phases of matter and the changes it undergoes.
- The variety of resources on Earth. Chemical elements, compounds and mixtures.
- Electrochemistry.
- Testing for results of biological processes.
- The composition of air. Combustion.
- Water and solution. Acids and bases.
- Silicon compounds and calcium compounds. Reactions of metals with non-metals.
- Pollution and steps to combat pollution.
- Manufactured substances in industries. Chemicals for consumers.

Biology

- Cellular biology. Unicellular and multicellular organisms.
- Adaptation of life to the environment.
- The evolutionary theory.
- Scientific classification of life.
- The sensory organs.
- Biodiversity and the interdependence among living organisms and the environment.
- Biological production and population growth: recognising reasons for an exponential and logistic function in a graph.
- Animal gestation and plant germination. Life cycles. Photosynthesis.
- Harms and uses of different plants and animals, overall knowledge of role each organism plays in an ecosystem.
- Human growth
- Nutrition. The classes of food and a balanced diet. The human digestive system. Absorption of digested food and reabsorption of water and defecation. The habits of healthy eating.
- The human anatomy.
- Respiration in humans, animals and plants.
- Blood circulation and transport in humans and plants.
- Support and movement in humans, animals and plants.
- Excretion in humans, animals and plants.
- Asexual reproduction in organisms.
- Sexual reproduction and organs in male and female. The menstrual cycle, fertilisation, pregnancy and pre-natal care.
- Sexual intercourse and safe sex. Research in human reproduction and cloning.
- Pollination, flowers and dispersal of fruits. The development of fruit and seeds. Vegetative reproduction in flowering plants.

Physics

- The scientific method. Physical quantities and their units. The use of measuring tools. The concept of mass and the importance of standard units in measurements.
- Energy. Its forms such as heat, thermodynamics in a system and the conservation of energy.
- Biogeochemical cycles: water cycle, nitrogen cycle, atmosphere, hydrosphere, biosphere.
- Air pressure and its application.
- Dynamics. Forces, work and power.
- Stability.
- Simple machines.
- Reflection and refraction of light. Concave and convex lens. Vision and optical illusions.
- Sound waves.
- Electricity and electrostatics. Ohm's law. Concept of series and parallel circuits. Current, voltage and resistance.
- Magnetism and electromagnetism.
- The generation of electricity. Electronics. Transformers. Electrical supply and wiring system at home. Fuses and Earth wire.
- Astrophysics. The Solar System, stars, galaxies and the universe.
- The history and developments of space exploration and the field of astronomy.

=== Geography, History and Living Skills ===
The format of the Geography, History and Living Skills examination in the PMR were the same. It had only 1 paper which consists of 60 multiple choice questions in escalating difficulty. The time limit for Geography and History were 1 hour and 15 minutes while for Living Skills it was 1 hour and 30 minutes. The Geography and History papers are commonly deemed very easy as questions are normally recycled from previous years.

Geography

The Geography paper focuses more on human geography rather than physical geography and is primarily focused on Malaysia. It features environmental geography, geomatics and regional geography. The usage of calculators was allowed for this examination. The Geography examination was widely considered as the easiest subject to score "A". The topics covered in the examination include:

- Basic geography: Map reading, bearing, interpretation of topographical map and other basic techniques in geography.
- Physical geography: Weather and climate, natural vegetation, plate tectonics, weathering, rivers, coasts, climatic, manmade and natural disasters.
- Human geography: Population, settlements, agriculture and aquaculture, natural resource management, industrialisation, tourism, physical and human resources.

History

The History paper featured both national history and international history. However, it focused more on Malaysia's road to independence during the British colonial times.

Living Skills

For the Living Skills (similar to Design and Technology in many countries) paper, the subject was categorised into 4 elective groups where students could choose any one. Then there was the mandatory section where students must have taken engineering drawing, technology, invention, domestic piping, electronics, electrical engineering, basic economics, home decor and safety, tailoring, horticulture and gardening, telecommunication, cooking, consumerism, and signs. The 4 elective groups are:

- Choice 1: Technical Skills (such as engine, electromechanics, motor and technical drawing)
- Choice 2: Home Economics (such as sewing, baking, catering and fashion)
- Choice 3: Agricultural Science (such as landscape, pets, gardening and plantation)
- Choice 4: Business and Entrepreneurship (such as marketing, entrepreneurship, accounting and commerce)

This paper was closed and is not allowed to be seen by the public. This was done mainly due to the sheer amount of recycled questions every year.

Students were also required to complete three projects, that was folios, for these 3 subjects to receive their PMR slip and certificate. Similar to the Malay and English language examination which requires the students to have their oral and listening comprehension examination, these 3 folios would have contributed marks to the actual PMR examination during October. This project was to help the students to score distinctions as these papers are tough.

== Results ==
The results were released in late December every year to all candidates through the relevant schools. The grades ranges from A (excellent) to E (failure), or even T for non-attendance (Tidak hadir). The grading scores were slightly readjusted based on general performances. Hospitalized students could take the examination at the hospital they were staying at.

Based on the results and individual interests, students would have been streamed into Science, Arts, IT, or vocational streams for the following 2 final upper secondary years of schooling. The government aimed for a ratio of 60 Science to 40 Arts students, but this goal was ultimately not met.

The results for the last batch of PMR (2013) was released on 19 December 2013 prior to its abolition in 2014.

== Abolition ==
In 2011, Deputy Prime Minister Tan Sri Muhyiddin Yassin declared that the PMR examination would be abolished in 2014, and the Form Three students' performance for that year would be tested through a School-Based Assessment (SBA) conducted by the schools themselves. The SBA is to be monitored by the Examination Board to ensure the examination questions are of adequate quality and can truly gauge the students' level of performance. According to the then Deputy Prime Minister, this measure will also enable parents to obtain the latest information on their children's academic performances in school. After numerous debates, it was finally confirmed in early October 2012, that PMR would be officially abolished.

== See also ==
- Education in Malaysia
- Ujian Pencapaian Sekolah Rendah (UPSR)
- Sijil Pelajaran Malaysia (SPM)
- Sijil Tinggi Persekolahan Malaysia (STPM)
