= Primary School Achievement Test (Malaysia) =

Former standardised test in Malaysian primary schools

Primary School Achievement Test, also known as Ujian Pencapaian Sekolah Rendah (commonly abbreviated as UPSR; Malay), was a national examination taken by all students in Malaysia at the end of their sixth year in primary school before they leave for secondary school. It was prepared and examined by the Malaysian Examinations Syndicate (Lembaga Peperiksaan Malaysia), an agency that constitutes the Ministry of Education.

The UPSR tests were first established in 1988 to replace the Standard Five assessment.

Starting from 2016, students in national schools (sekolah kebangsaan) were required to take six subjects. Students in Chinese and Tamil national-type schools (sekolah jenis kebangsaan) were required to take two additional language subjects, totalling eight subjects.

Multiple choice questions were tested using a standardised optical answer sheet that uses optical mark recognition for detecting answers.

This exam was held annually on the first Monday of September. The score was calculated based on a bell curve, thus the passing grade is reflected by the yearly performance.

Prior to its abolition in 2021, all UPSR examination papers were considered official confidential property and were protected under the Official Secrets Act 1972 of Malaysia.

Effective 2021, the UPSR exams were abolished and replaced with school-based assessments, seeing it suffer the same fate as the PMR examinations.

== Subjects ==
The subjects that are taken in this exam include:

- Bahasa Malaysia (Pemahaman or Malay Comprehension)
- Bahasa Malaysia (Penulisan or Malay Writing)
- Mathematics (Matematik/数学/கணிதம்)
- Science (Sains/科学/அறிவியல்)
- English (Comprehension)
- English (Writing)
- Chinese 华文 (Pemahaman 理解 or Chinese Comprehension 华文理解) - Compulsory for Chinese school (SJKC) students only
- Chinese 华文 (Penulisan 作文 or Chinese Writing 华文作文) - Compulsory for Chinese school (SJKC) students only
- Tamil தமிழ் மொழி (Pemahaman கருத்துணர்தல் or Tamil Comprehension தமிழ் மொழி கருத்துணர்தல்) - Compulsory for Tamil school (SJKT) students only
- Tamil தமிழ் மொழி (Penulisan கட்டுரை or Tamil Writing தமிழ் மொழி கட்டுரை) - Compulsory for Tamil school (SJKT) students only

Each of the two Bahasa Malaysia subjects is offered at two different levels: the harder SK level and the easier SJK level, due to the difference in the Bahasa Malaysia syllabus taught in SK and SJK. However, SJK students may opt to sit for the SK paper with permission from their schools.

=== Mathematics ===
In 1995, UPSR Mathematics tests were changed to include subjective questions.

The mathematics examination is divided into two papers, paper 1 and paper 2.

Starting from 2016, the exam is one hour long for each paper. Paper 1 is a multiple choice paper and consists of forty questions, all have a one-point score value. Paper 2 is the subjective area of Maths. There are 15 questions here in total, the first five questions have a three-point score value, questions 6-10 have a four-point score value, and the last five have a five-point score value.

Questions that are frequently asked in this exam are fractions, subtraction, multiplication, division, addition, area and volume, mass, perimeter, decimal points, average, data, digit numbers, percentage, money, time, date and duration.

=== Science ===
Science was first made a part of the UPSR in 1997.

Starting from 2016, the science examination is divided into two papers, paper 1 and paper 2. Each paper lasts for an hour.

For paper 1, students are given 40 multiple choice questions with a weight of one mark each. For paper 2, students answer subjective questions. In the subjective paper, there are eight questions and each question has 3 to 5 sub-questions which carry 1 to 3 marks depending on the question. The total weight that can be given here is 40.

== Examining and result ==
After the completion of all exams, the examination papers will be brought to centres across the country to be evaluated. The distribution of papers across all the states can be random or otherwise, according to the wishes of the invigilator. All objective answer sheets are examined by computer, and all subjective answer sheets are marked by professional examiners. After completion the examination of all papers, the marks will be registered into an online system. A council will be called to ascertain the specific marks for the grade of each subject (the standard mark for an 'A' grade is 80 and above, however, should the year's cohort perform badly, the marks may be lowered to 70+ and above for an 'A'). It also may be 85+ for an A.The results are then printed and distributed to the education department of every district. Usually, the results are announced on the last Thursday of the school year (it is the second-last day of school for all states except Terengganu, Kelantan, Kedah and Johor where it is the final day of school for the year), but in some years, it is published during the school holidays.

A new grading scheme was introduced in 2016 as below: A: 80-100 B: 65-79 C: 50-64 D: 40-49 E: 0-39

Grade E is the only failing grade for all subjects.

== Format change ==
In 2016, several changes were made to the format of all the important subjects :

=== Pemahaman ===
The Pemahaman paper has 2 sections, A and B. Section A has 20 objective questions for 40 marks and Section B has 5 questions for 60 marks. This exam lasted for 1 hour and 15 minutes.

=== Penulisan ===
The new format for Penulisan consists of three sections, namely A, B and C. The time allowed is one hour and fifteen minutes.

For section A, a picture will be given. Then, pupils must build five compound sentences based on the picture. The marks allocated for this section is 10. Occasionally, however, pictures might not be provided and to substitute that, candidates might be asked to write sentences about a graph, a mind map, multiple images, or a time table.

For section B, candidates must write a review about the stimulus given to be written on the UPSR paper. The marks allocated for this section is 15 marks.

For Section C, The student must choose one out of two questions and write an essay of between 80 and 100 words. The marks allocated for this section is 25 marks.

=== English ===
English now has Comprehension and Writing papers, unlike the previous single paper.

The questions in the Comprehension paper are grouped into two sections: A with 20 multiple choice questions dealing with Grammar, Vocabulary and Comprehension; and B with 5 questions, dealing with Social expressions, Comprehension, and HOTS (Higher Order Thinking Skills)

== 2014 paper leak ==
On 10 September 2014, the Examination Syndicate had made a statement stating that instead of the Science paper(018, 028, 038) being sat the next day, it would be postponed to 30 September. The reason given for the postponement was due to the fact that the question paper was leaked on social media. A few days later, another statement had been made saying that the English paper(014) has also been leaked and will be sat on the same day. About a week later, the Education Ministry announced that the Tamil(036, 037) and Maths (Paper 1(015/1, 025/1, 035/1)) papers were also found to be hacked, and would be sat on 9 October.

== 2021 abolishment ==
On 28 April 2021, Senior Minister of Education and Society and Minister of Education Mohd Radzi Md Jidin announced through a press conference that the UPSR exam will be abolished from 2021 onwards. He also said that students will be evaluated using school-based assessments, a system which had been in effect since 2011. Talk of abolishing the examination had begun in 2016 when the then-Education Minister, Mahdzir Khalid said that a study was being done to evaluate the future of UPSR.

== See also ==
- Education in Malaysia
- Penilaian Menengah Rendah (PMR)
- Sijil Pelajaran Malaysia (SPM)
- Sijil Tinggi Pelajaran Malaysia (STPM)
- Ujian Nasional
