= National Exam (Indonesia) =

Educational assessment in Indonesia

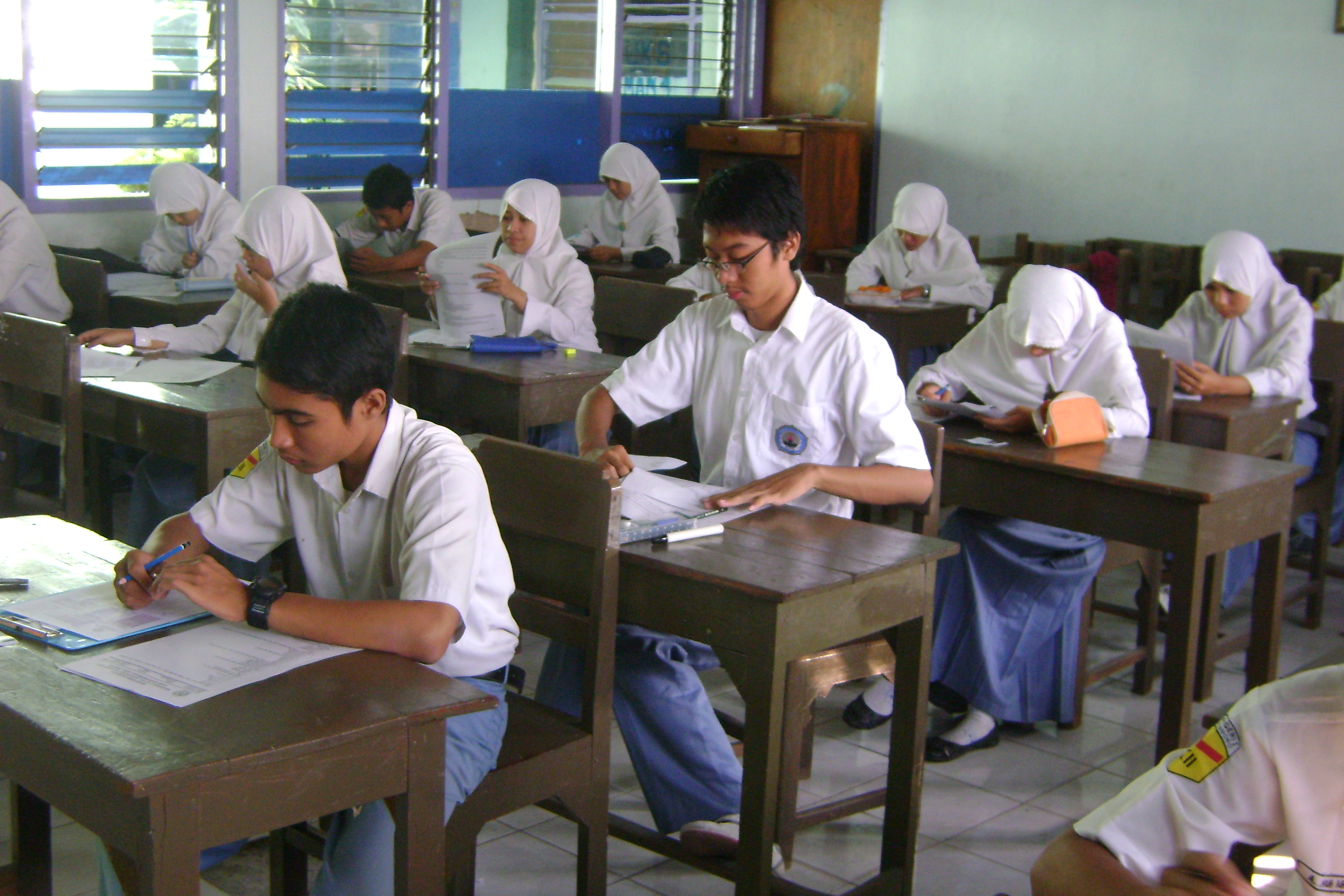
National examination in Indonesia.

National Exam (Indonesian: Ujian Nasional, commonly abbreviated as UN or UNAS) was a standard evaluation system of primary and secondary education in Indonesia and the determining factor of quality of education levels among the areas that are conducted by the Center for Educational Assessment of the Ministry of Education and Culture.

The Act Number 20 of 2003 states that, in order to control the quality of education nationwide it is to be evaluated as a form of accountability of education providers to the parties concerned. Further stated that the evaluations conducted by independent agencies on a regular basis, comprehensively, transparently, and systematically to assess the achievement of national education standards and the monitoring process evaluation should be done continuously. Evaluation of the monitoring process is carried out continuously and continuous in the end will be able to fix the quality of education. Improving the quality of education begins with the determination of the standard.

Determination standards continue to rise is expected to encourage increased quality of education, which is the determination of educational standards is the determination of the limit value (cut-off score). One is said to have passed the exam when it has passed the limit value of the boundary between learners who have mastered certain competencies with learners who have not mastered certain competencies. When that happens on the national exam or school then the boundary value function to separate the students who graduated and did not pass is called the limit of graduation, graduation delimitation activities called standard setting.

Benefits of standard setting final exam:

- The limit of graduation each subject in accordance with the demands of minimum competency.
- The same standards for each subject as a minimum standard of competency achievement.

It has been proposed to do a computerized version of National Exam, with trials starting in 2015.

In the same year, National Exam is no longer a standard of education completion as it is stated on Government Regulation No. 13 of 2015. The government policy states that education completion will depend on completing all school learning programs, obtaining at least good on attitude aspect score, and passing the school exam.

There is no cut-off score because the newest exam policy is aimed to map Indonesian students’ competency in every single region in Indonesia. The data are going to be analyzed and will be used to make education improvement strategies in Indonesia.

Originally, the 2020 National Exam was scheduled to be the last, as it was to be replaced by a new format the following year. However, due to the coronavirus pandemic, President Joko Widodo announced the cancellation of the 2020 national examination for all education levels, except Vocational High School (Sekolah Menengah Kejuruan, SMK) that has already been conducted in 47% of the schools in the country. As a result, the National Exam in Indonesia was removed a year earlier.

== Subjects ==
=== Elementary school (Sekolah Dasar/Madrasah Ibtidaiyah (SD/MI)) ===
- Indonesian
- Maths
- Science

=== Middle school (Sekolah Menengah Pertama/Madrasah Tsanawiyah (SMP/MTs)) ===
- Indonesian
- Maths
- Science (Physics/Biology)
- English
- Social studies (History, Sociology, Economy, Geography,)

=== High school (Sekolah Menengah Atas/Sekolah Menengah Kejuruan/Madrasah Aliyah (SMA/SMK/MA)) ===
| Streams | Common Subjects | Stream Subjects |
|---|---|---|
| Natural science | Indonesian; English; Math | Physics, Chemistry, Biology |
| Social studies | Indonesian; English; Math | Economy, Geography, Sociology, History |
| Language | Indonesian; English; Math | Indonesian literature, History/Anthropology; Foreign Language Other Than English (Mandarin, Japanese, German, French, Arabic) |
| Religion (MA) | Indonesian; English; Math | Tafsir, Hadith, Kalam, Arabic |
| Vocational (SMK) | Indonesian; English; Math | History, Vocational Theory, Vocational Practice |

National Exam for high school and vocational school students has a big change in 2017. In the previous years, students needed to take 6 subjects (3 compulsory subjects and 3 course related subjects) when sitting for national exam. It was changed by the new Minister of Education in the late 2016. Students are given a chance to choose one subject from 3 course related subjects in 2017 National Exam. Total 4 subjects are objected to allow student gain more focus on studying for the exam.

Moreover the chosen subject does not affect the college major option.

== National Education Standards ==
During this national exam graduation delimitation is determined by agreement between the decision makers only. Limit is determined the same grade for each subject. Whereas the characteristics of subjects and skills students are not the same. It was not a consideration of education decision-makers. Not necessarily in a certain education level, each subject has the same standard as a minimum standard of competency achievement. There are subjects that require a high minimum competency achievement, while other subjects do not specify that high. This situation becomes unfair for students, because the required capacity exceeds the maximum capability.

== Standard strategy ==
Preparation of standard setting begins with the determination of the approach used in setting standards. There are three kinds of approaches that can be used as a reference, namely:

- Determination of standard based on the general impression of the test.
- Determination of standard based on the contents of each test item.
- The determination of standards based on test scores.

At the end of each learning activity is concluded and accounting standard setting based on three approaches to determining the limits of graduation.

== Schedule ==
=== Main test ===
| Year | SMK/MAK | | SMA/MA | | SMP/MTs | | SD/MI | |
| Year | Start | Finish | Start | Finish | Start | Finish | Start | Finish |
|---|---|---|---|---|---|---|---|---|
| 2005 | 30 May | 1 June | 30 May | 1 June | 6 June | 8 June | N/A | |
| 2006 | 16 May | 18 May | 16 May | 18 May | 22 May | 24 May | N/A | |
| 2007 | 17 April | 19 April | 17 April | 19 April | 24 April | 26 April | N/A | |
| 2008 | 22 April | 24 April | 22 April | 24 April | 5 May | 8 May | 12 May | 14 May |
| 2009 | 20 April | 24 April | 20 April | 24 April | 27 April | 30 April | 4 May | 8 May |
| 2010 | 22 March | 26 March | 22 March | 26 March | 29 March | 1 April | 5 April | 7 April |
| 2011 | 18 April | 21 April | 18 April | 21 April | 25 April | 28 April | 10 May | 12 May |
| 2012 | 16 April | 19 April | 16 April | 19 April | 23 April | 26 April | 7 May | 9 May |
| 2013 | 15 April | 18 April | 15 April | 18 April | 22 April | 25 April | 6 May | 8 May |
| 2014 | 14 April | 16 April | 14 April | 16 April | 5 May | 8 May | 19 May | 21 May |
| 2015 (paper-based) | 13 April | 15 April | 13 April | 15 April | 4 May | 7 May | different by each province | |
| 2015 (computer-based) | 13 April | 21 April | 13 April | 21 April | 4 May | 7 May | different by each province | |
| 2016 (paper-based) | 4 April | 6 April | 4 April | 6 April | 9 May | 12 May | different by each province | |
| 2016 (computer-based) | 4 April | 12 April | 4 April | 12 April | 9 May | 12 May | N/A | |
| 2017 | 3 April | 6 April | 10 April | 13 April | 2 May | 8 May | N/A | |
| 2018 | 2 April | 5 April | 9 April | 12 April | 23 April | 26 April | N/A | |
| 2019 | 25 March | 28 March | 1 April (Note: The 2019 National Exam for SMA held on 1, 2, 4, and 8 April.) | 8 April | 22 April | 25 April | N/A | |
| 2020 | 16 March | 19 March | Cancelled | | | | | |

== Cutoff score ==
| Years | Minimum Score | Minimum average |
|---|---|---|
| 2005 | 4.25 | 5.25 |
| 2006 | 4.25 | 4.50 |
| 2007 | 6.00 | |
| 2008 | 4.25 | 5.25 |
| 2009 | 4.25 | 5.50 |
| 2010 | 4.25 | 5.50 |
| 2011 | 4.25 | 5.50 |
| 2012 | 4.25 | 5.50 |
| 2013 | 4.25 | 5.50 |
| 2014 | 4.25 | 5.50 |
| 2015 | N/A | |

== Controversy ==
=== Criticism ===
The National Exam has been the subject of controversy since it was first established. It became notorious for answer key leakage, cheating, fraud, and corruption. Some argue that the exam is too demanding for students. Schools were forced to allocate more time for preparing the students, putting a significant workload on both teachers and students.

The National Exam failure rate is usually very low. Critics argue that it does not give an accurate portrayal of the Indonesian students' real competency because of problems with cheating and other issues.

The 2010 National Exam fail rate for middle and high school was unusually high. A possible explanation for this sudden increase in failure rate is due to the fact that the test was to be issued in March, giving schools less time for prepare. Additionally, there was an increase in the difficulty of questions and the cutoff score was raised. There were National Exam retests held in 2009 and 2010, but any further retests were discontinued the following year.

Some Indonesians call for the abolishment of the National Exam. However, the Education and Culture Ministry have so far defended the National Exam.

There is a site dedicated for groups that advocate the abolishment of the National Exam.

==== Exam fraud and cheating issues ====
Cheating was very rampant, because of the huge pressure to pass the exam. Schools and teachers either ignored it, encouraged it, or even did it themselves. Examples include : using mobile phones to send answers to other students, giving the answer key (either openly or discreetly), and changing the answer on the answer sheet. School principals and teachers have been arrested on that case.

To deter cheating, National Exam question variation was increased for middle and high school, from one to five in 2011, and from five to 20 in 2013. Other measures were the inclusion of barcodes in 2013 partly to determine question variation codes and to tackle cheating. Even then, cheating still occurred.

==== Exam material shortage and quality ====
In 2013, National Exam for high school were delayed in 11 provinces because of printing and packing confusion and errors. It was attributed to increase of question variation. Schools are forced to self-copy the question papers. Some demanded the then-Education and Culture Minister, Mohammad Nuh, to resign.

== See also ==
- Education in Indonesia
- Ujian Pencapaian Sekolah Rendah
