= Iodosilane =

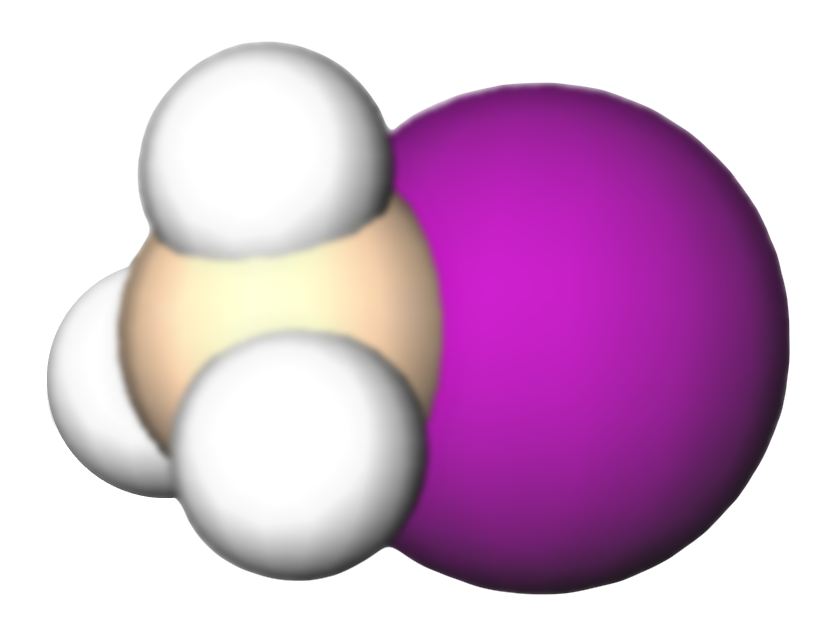

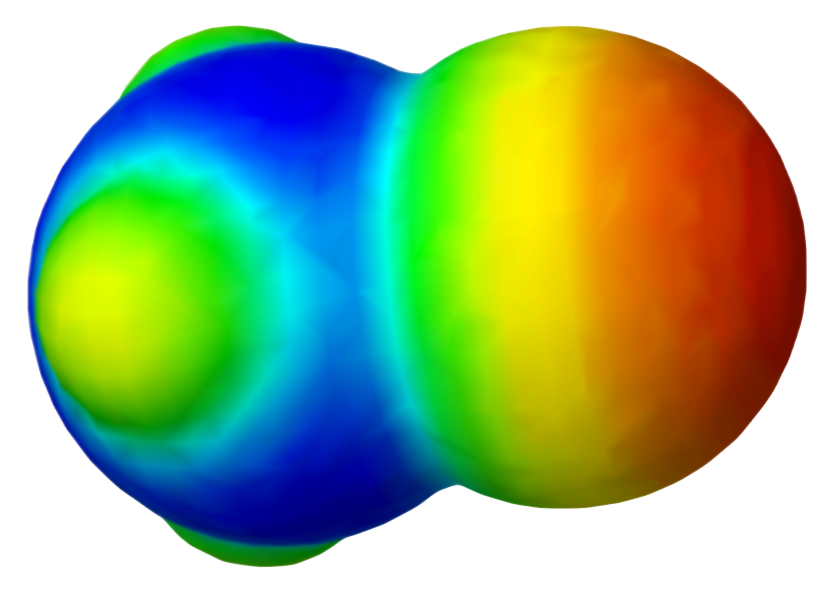

Identifiers
CAS Number	13598-42-0
3D model (JSmol)	Interactive image
ChemSpider	123034
PubChem CID	139512
CompTox Dashboard (EPA)	DTXSID80929200
- InChI: InChI=1S/H3ISi/c1-2/h2H3 Key: IDIOJRGTRFRIJL-UHFFFAOYSA-N
- SMILES: I[SiH3]

Properties
Chemical formula	SiH_{3}I
Molar mass	158.014 g/mol
Appearance	colorless crystals
Density	2.070 g·cm^{−3} (0.5 °C); 2.035 g·cm^{−3} (14.8 °C)
Melting point	−56.6 °C (216.6 K)
Boiling point	45.8 °C (318.9 K)
- Except where otherwise noted, data are given for materials in their standard state (at 25 °C [77 °F], 100 kPa). Infobox references

Iodosilane is a chemical compound of silicon, hydrogen, and iodine. It is a colorless monoclinic crystal of space group P2_{1}/c at −157 °C.

== Preparation ==
Iodosilane is the first product of the reaction between monosilane and iodine, the other products being di-, tri- and finally tetraiodosilane (silicon tetraiodide).

It can also be produced by the reaction of phenylsilane or chlorophenylsilane with hydrogen iodide.

$$\mathrm{ClC_6H_4SiH_3 + HI \longrightarrow C_6 H_5 Cl + SiH_3I}$$

== Properties ==
At low temperatures, iodosilane quickly reacts with [Co(CO)_{4}]^{−} to form SiH_{3}Co(CO)_{4}.
