= Keatite =

Tetragonal polymorph of silica, mineral

- Crystal structure

General
- Category: Tectosilicate minerals
- Group: Quartz group
- Formula: SiO_{2}
- Strunz classification: 4.DA.45
- Crystal system: Tetragonal

Identification
- Crystal habit: Microscopic inclusions

Keatite is a silicate mineral with the chemical formula SiO_{2} (silicon dioxide) that was discovered in nature in 2013. It is a tetragonal polymorph of silica first known as a synthetic phase. It was reported as minute inclusions within clinopyroxene (diopside) crystals in an ultra high pressure garnet pyroxenite body. The host rock is part of the Kokchetav Massif in Kazakhstan.

Keatite was synthesized in 1954 and named for Paul P. Keat who discovered it while studying the role of soda in the crystallization of amorphous silica. Keatite was well known before 1970 as evidenced in few studies from that era.
