= SMK Datuk Patinggi Haji Abdul Gapor =

Public secondary school in Kuching, Sarawak, Malaysia

Location
- Lorong Stampin 23, Jalan Stampin, 93350 Kuching, Sarawak, Malaysia

Information
- Type: Public school; Secondary school; Boarding school; Mixed-gender education
- Motto: Mudah, Logik, Praktikal (Simple, Logical, Practical)
- Established: 1974
- Session: Double
- School code: YEA1201
- Principal: En. William anak Tedong
- Grades: Form 1 – Form 6
- Colours: White; Yellow; Green; Red
- Song: Usaha dan Yakin
- Accreditation: Malaysia MOE

Sekolah Menengah Kebangsaan Datuk Patinggi Haji Abdul Gapor (SMK DPHA Gapor) or in English: Datuk Patinggi Haji Abdul Gapor National Secondary School, is a public secondary school located in Kuching, Sarawak, Malaysia. The school was named after the Sarawakian hero Datu Patinggi Abdul Gapur.

== History ==
SMK DPHA Gapor was established by Sarawak State Education Department in 1974.

The first principal of the school was Encik Haji Abdul Rahman bin Sahari. At that time, there were only 182 students studying in the school and a fraction of them were staying in the school's dormitories. There were only four teachers teaching in the school.

April 1974 marked an important date for the school because it was moved from SRK Lumba Kuda to new premises at Jalan Tun Jugah, Stampin. Due to the fact that SMK DPHA Gapor is now located in Stampin, it is also being referred to as SMK Stampin. It was the first-ever school in Sarawak to use Malay as primary language for communication.

In 1976, the first entry of students to SMK DPHA Gapor from the student exchange programme initiated by Sarawak Foundation boasted 20 male students from Peninsular Malaysia and 6 from Sabah.

In 1977, there were 26 classrooms, 8 of them for Transition classes, 10 for Form 1, 7 for Form 2 and 1 for Form 3.

The year 1986 was the most challenging year in the history of the school because in this particular year, for the first time, the school accepted admission of students into Lower 6 Literature classes, which consisted of 3 classes, and hearing-impaired students into Form 3 special class. Ergo, in 1987, the school issued its first Sijil Tinggi Persekolahan Malaysia (STPM) candidates and Sijil Rendah Pelajaran (SRP) hearing-impaired candidates. The Form 3 special class, together with the teachers, were transferred from SMK Batu Lintang because of the reasons that SMK DPHA Gapor was a boarding school and SMK Batu Lintang had established a special class for visually impaired students.

On 18 July 1987, SMK DPHA Gapor was officiated by the Minister of Finance, Yang Berhormat Mulia Tan Sri Tengku Razaleigh.

In the beginning, the school emblem had the letters "BM" written on it which were short for Berjaya Maju or Bahasa Malaysia, meaning succeed excellently and Malay language respectively. Nevertheless, the official meaning of the two letters was towards the path of excellence. However, Encik Bedui bin Une, who was the eighth Principal in SMK DPHA Gapor, did a little amendment to the motto of the school and changed it to "Mudah, Logik, Praktikal", literally meaning simple, logical and practical. The school anthem Usaha dan Yakin was written by Encik Zainuddin Haji Suut.

== List of Principals ==
No.	Name	Serving Period
1	En. Haji Abdul Rahman bin Sahari	1974–1977
2	En. Zamhari Haji Mustapha	1978–1981
3	En. Abdul Rani Ojek	1982–1985
4	Pn. Fatimah binti Matair	1985–1987
5	En. Ricky Ho	1987–1989
6	Pn. Saadiah Bujang	1989–1992
7	En. Mohd. Zain Ismail	1993–1994
8	En. Bedui Haji Une	1996–2003
9	Pn. Hasanah Haji Junaidi	2003–2013
10	En. Wahab Bujang	2013–2014
11	En. Rosli bin Sahmat	2014–2015
12	Tn. Haji Rambli bin Zainudin	2016–2018
13	Tn. Haji Affandi bin Rosli	2018–2022
14	En. William anak Tedong	2022–present

== Achievements ==
- In 2010, SMK DPHA Gapor topped the secondary schools category with 16 gold and 2 silver medals in the 10th Sarawak Wushu Championship at Civic Centre.
- In 2011, the football team of SMK DPHA Gapor emerged as the champion of the 2nd Sarawak Football Development Programme (SFDP) Inter-Centre Southern Zone Football Tournament at SMK Tabuan Jaya field.
- In 2013, the school's handball team emerged victorious in the Kuching MSSM Handball Championship held at Stakan Sports Complex, Kota Sentosa.
- In March 2015, students from SMK DPHA Gapor swept the top three and consolation prizes in a web development competition organised by the Faculty of Engineering, Computing and Science at Swinburne University of Technology Sarawak Campus.
- In April 2015, Mohd Zuhayr Redza Noor Azrul, Melvin Gilbert Gimang and Marlon Umak of SMK DPHA Gapor 1 collected a total of 1,692 pinfalls and won the secondary schools category of the Megalanes Adventure World (MAW) Inter School Invitational Bowling Meet Saturday.
- In Malaysian University English Test (MUET) November 2016 session, Phoebe Ong Yunliang of SMK DPHA Gapor emerged as the country's top scorer.
- In 2017, the school continued to produce another top scorer, Wayne Ho Xiun Liang, in MUET November session.
- In July 2018, the team representing SMK DPHA Gapor, Lion and Unicorn, was among the gold prize winners of Young Innovators Challenge (YIC) Sarawak hosted by Swinburne University of Technology Sarawak Campus.
- In August 2018, SMK DPHA Gapor won second place for its 'Smart Container Reminder' project in the upper secondary category of the Robot Cup Competition at the Sarawak Community Invention Engineering Competition and Exhibition (SCIENCE) organised by Sarawak Energy.
- In May 2023, SMK DPHA Gapor won third place for the Tan Sri Datuk Panglima Dr. Abdul Rahman Ahmad Challenge Trophy for English Language Debate Competition Kuching District of 2023 (Inter-school Debate Competition) hosted by St. Thomas' National Secondary School
