= Keat Hwa Chinese Schools =

Group of Chinese schools in Alor Setar, Kedah, Malaysia

Keat Hwa Chinese schools (simplified Chinese: 吉华国民型华文学校; traditional Chinese: 吉華國民型華文學校; pinyin: Jíhuá Guómínxíng Huáwén Xuéxiao; Pe̍h-ōe-jī: Kiat-hôa Kok-bîn-hêng Hôa-bûn Ha̍k-hāu) are a group of Chinese schools in Alor Setar, Kedah, Malaysia, consisting of three secondary and three primary schools.

== Secondary schools ==
- Keat Hwa Secondary School
- Keat Hwa II Secondary School
- Keat Hwa High School

== Primary schools ==
- Keat Hwa H Primary School
- Keat Hwa K Primary School
- Keat Hwa S Primary School
