= Sam Tet Secondary School =

SMJK Sam Tet
- 三德国民型华文中学; Sekolah Menengah Jenis Kebangsaan Cina Sam Tet
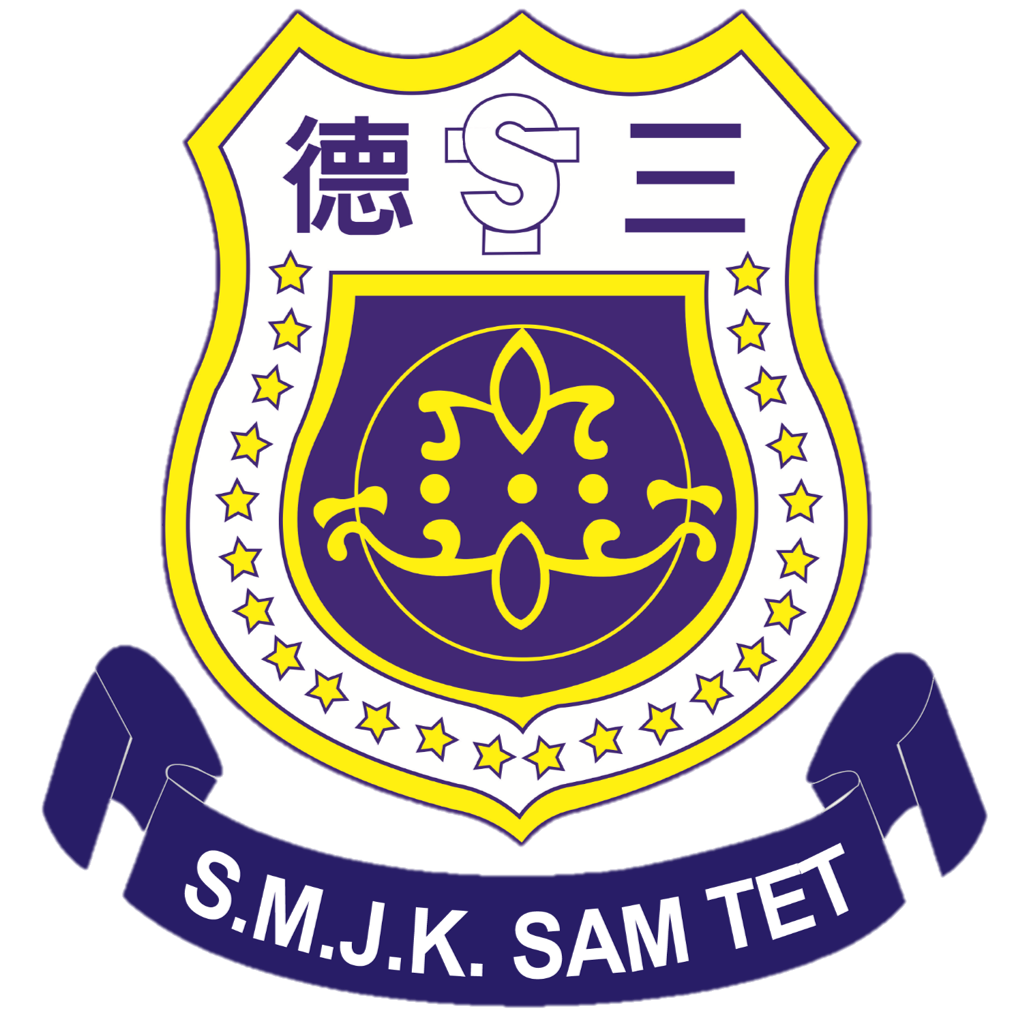

Location
- 5, Jalan Gereja, 30300; Ipoh, Perak; Malaysia; 4.594071°N 101.088939°E

Information
- Type: National-type Chinese secondary school
- Motto: Faith Hope Charity
- Established: 1 September 1934; 92 years ago
- Founders: Father Fourgs, MEP
- School code: AEB2053
- Principal: Mr Lee Yuen Keong
- Teaching staff: 145 (2022)
- Gender: Boys (Form 1-5); Co-educational (Form 6)
- Enrollment: 1,774 (2022)
- Colors: Blue, yellow and white
- Website: sites.google.com/moe-dl.edu.my/smjk-sam-tet/utama/
- Last updated: 7 January 2025

Sam Tet National Type Chinese Secondary School
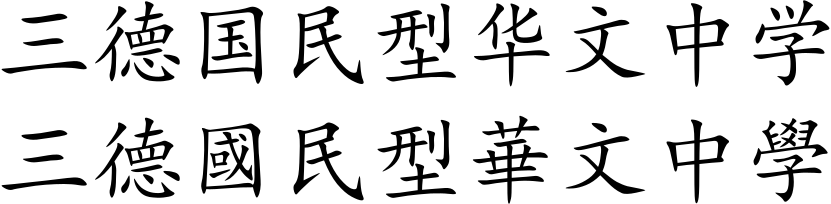
- Sam Tet National Type Chinese Secondary School in Simplified Chinese (top) and Traditional Chinese character (below)
- Traditional Chinese: 三德國民型華文中學
- Simplified Chinese: 三德国民型华文中学
Transcriptions
Standard Mandarin
- Hanyu Pinyin: Sāndé Guómínxíng Huáwén Zhōngxué
Yue: Cantonese
- Jyutping: Saam1 dak1 gwok3 man4 jing4 waa4 man4 zung1 hok6

Sam Tet Secondary School, (Chinese: 三德国民型华文中学; Malay: Sekolah Menengah Jenis Kebangsaan Sam Tet) is a national-type Chinese-based Roman Catholic all boys secondary school located in Ipoh, Perak, Malaysia. The school offers the national curriculum (SPM) and (STPM). It is located adjacent to its affiliated primary school, Sam Tet Primary School.

The school was nominated for School of Excellence in 2007 by the Ministry of Education (Malaysia). Since 2015, the school was awarded Cluster School of Excellence title. Sam Tet also excels in musical orchestras such as the Sam Tet Brass Band, Symphony Orchestra, Chinese Orchestra, and choir band. In the year 1998, 28 students scored 5 A's in STPM and set a new Malaysian record. The school is one the most acclaimed all-boys school in the nation.

The school excels in basketball, swimming, debate and most prominently, academics.

== History ==
=== Early school planning ===
The history of SMJK Sam Tet is closely related to the progress of its primary school, SRJK Sam Tet, built in 1934. SMJK Sam Tet owes its existence to Father Fourgs, a French expatriate missionary priest from the local Catholic Church. Being displeased with the high percentage of illiteracy amongst the local populace, he organized a meeting with the fish community to discuss the issue at hand. The outcome of that meeting was a plan to construct a Chinese-medium school (but now considered national-type ethnic Chinese-based with Malay as language of instruction since 1970s educational reforms) for the predominantly Chinese community. A committee was formed to collect donations and to look into other relevant matters pertaining to said plan. The people showed great interest and responded encouragingly to help in financial matters. Thus, an administrative board was appointed to register the school with the government. Father Fourgs was elected as the first school supervisor under the leadership of Wong Chin Sun as the headmaster.

=== Pre-World War II ===
The first class started on September 1, 1934, with a total of 64 students in 2 classes. In the following year, with an increase in the number of students, the need for more educators increased in tandem. In view of this, the Board of Governors from the local Catholic Church decided to aid in the administration of the school by allocating funds annually.

At the end of the year 1935, Wong Chin Sun retired as the headmaster and was replaced by Phoong Tet Ching in 1936. In the same year, the school had a total of 160 students and 6 teachers sharing 4 classrooms. It was in this year, that Father Fourgs, the founder of the school, died. Father Francis took charge as the school's new supervisor.

In 1940, SRJK Sam Tet decided to build an additional 6 classrooms but the grim grip of World War II on Malaysia forced the project to be put on-hold.

=== Post-World War II ===
After the war ended in 1945, lessons resumed, and the building project was completed in 1969. The school underwent further expansion three years later with the help of a Catholic school in Singapore. Three Brothers were assigned to the school in 1950. A proper school building for SMJK Sam Tet was erected in 1951.

At the beginning of 1952, three Junior Middle I classes were started under the leadership of Brother Joseph Wong as the principal. An additional three classes started a year later and went into full operation. In 1954, Brother Joseph Wong was replaced by Brother Joche-Chanel Soon, who later founded Maris Stella High School, Singapore. It was also in this year that the first batch of Junior Middle III students graduated. A total of eight classes were in-service.

In 1955, Brother Marcel was appointed principal of the school. Under his leadership, an additional four classrooms, a science lab and a canteen were built. The school was upgraded to a National Type School in 1958 and the students sat for the L.C.E. examination. It was in this year that Brother Marcel left the school on a transfer.

SMJK Sam Tet continued to progress rapidly under the leadership of Brother John Moh who succeeded Brother Marcel in 1959. He organised several donation-drives to extend the premises and purchase sports equipment. His effort paid off with the construction of a new 3-storey building. The school hall was erected in 1970 with the cost of RM200,000. Other facilities such as the library, the staff room and the administration office were included above the hall. The hall was opened by the Yang Mulia Raja Di Hilir Perak Darul Ridzuan on 5 June 1971.

1971 marks the beginning of form 6 classes, with an enrolment of 37 students. Further additions were made to the school in 1973. A 3-storey science block was constructed. The building was named after Ng Song Teik, the brother of Dato' Ng Song Choon. The ground floor of the building comprises the school canteen. The building was opened by the Yang Berhormat Haji Mohamed bin Yaacob, Minister of Education, on 11 May 1974. In 1976, SMJK Sam Tet celebrated its 25th anniversary. The occasion was officiated by Chan Siang Sun J.P., J.S.M., Deputy Minister of Education.

Due to the student population increased steadily, all its land was exhausted, and the facilities were inadequate to accommodate the increasing populace. To meet the demand for more buildings, Brother John Moh, with the aid of the Administrative Board, purchased more land to erect yet another phase of buildings. This new phase was completed in 1985.

In the year 1992, Brother John Moh retired after 34 years of service as Principal of the school. In honour of his services, the school hall was named after him. He was succeeded by Mr. Mok Soon Sang who was promoted to the office of principal. Upon his retirement at the end of 1992, Mr. Yu Cheng Sun was assigned to take his office. The school continued to expand rapidly with a total of 66 classes, enrolment of 2,423 students and a 137 strong staff.

=== Developments since 2000 ===
The school website was launched in 2002.

Brother John Moh Hall was upgraded to an air-conditioned hall equipped with an LCD screen. The PA system has also been upgraded. Extensive upgrading works, including the installation of the air conditioner mentioned, as well as an overhead bridge and the expansion of the staff room and library was initiated through events e.g. Jogathon since 2007 and completed before the June holidays ended in 2009.

Near the end of 2014, the hall was upgraded again. The lighting changed into ceiling-mounted lights and the doors were replaced.

During the mid-term holiday of 2015, the hall mounted LED lamps at the corner of the hall, another hall was built on top of the school library for sole usage of the school brass band. The school also rebuilds the classroom floor, staircase and school field during the end-year holiday of 2015.

== Achievements ==
=== Past year academic achievements ===
In 1987 the school achieved 100% passes in the STPM examinations. Out of the 13 students nationwide who scored 5 A's, eight came from SMJK Sam Tet. The years 1991 and 1994, 11 students scoring straight 5 A's in STPM. In 1996, 20 students achieved 5 A's and procured the school a national record. In the year 1998, 28 students scored 5 A's in STPM and SMJK Sam Tet entered the 'Malaysian Book of Records'.

For the PT3 exam year 2015, the school have 18 students from scored 10 A's, 26 students 9 A's and 25 students 8 A's. As for SPM, 6 students scored 11 A's, 27 with 10 A's, 47 students scored 9 A's and 18 students 8 A's. For the STPM, a total of 25 students scored 4 A's and 14 students 3 A's. Compared with 2014, the number of students getting 4 A's and 3 A's has increased from 24 to 39. The passing rate also increased from 86.03% to 90.30%. One of the STPM candidates, Choong Wai Kean, achieved the best overall results in Malaysia. He obtained five principals with a cumulative grade point average (CGPA) of 4.0.

PT3 result for 2015 was superseded by 2016 year's candidates. There were 79 students who excelled in their PT3 exam. 24 students obtained straight A's meanwhile 12 students got 9A's. Moreover, 24 students obtained 8A's and 19 of them received the result of 7A's. In addition, the general passing rate had an increase from 69.3% to 71.8%. SMJK Sam Tet also emerged as the school with the highest number of students scoring a 4.0 cumulative grade point average (CGPA) in Sijil Tinggi Pelajaran Malaysia (STPM) for 2016 in Perak. There are 12 students who scored straight A's, 3 had taken five subjects. Apart from that, the school had also recorded a 100% pass rate in last year's STPM, with all 183 STPM candidates passing the exam.

=== Extracurricular achievements ===
SMJK Sam Tet produced some of the best Chinese and English debaters in the nation, often competing with other top schools in Malaysia. The school's marching band, Sam Tet Brass Band, is the most successful marching bands in Perak, winning the Independence Day (Malaysia) Marching Band competition a record-setting 5 times.

=== Other achievements ===
On 29 January 2014, A total of 1,000 SMJK Sam Tet students were involved in the 'Longest Chinese Calligraphy (挥春)' program in Malaysia which successfully made it into the Malaysia Book of Records. The work, which contains 4,000 Chinese characters and measures about 2.5 km long, was completed within five days. All of the teachers and students took part in this historical event, marking a huge milestone in the school's achievements. Its words of blessing were meant for the Chinese New Year celebration.

SMJK Sam Tet has made it into the Malaysia Book of Records for the second time when staff and students organised a mass "zongzi" (sticky rice dumplings) making event at their school field on 15 June 2015 in conjunction with the upcoming Chinese Dumpling Festival. A total of 2,015 participants took part in the half-hour-long event, producing 2015 dumplings. Perak State Executive Councillor, Datuk Dr. Mah Hang Soon, who launched the event, said the event promoted Chinese and ketupat cultures.

In 2015, SMJK Sam Tet was branded a Cluster School of Excellence (Sekolah Kluster Kecemerlangan) by the Ministry of Education Malaysia.
