= SMJK Seg Hwa =

- 昔华国民型华文中学

Location
- Jalan Tahang Rimau; Segamat, Johor Darul Ta'zim, 85000; Malaysia; 2.5205°N 102.7998°E

Information
- Former names: Hwa Chiao National Type Secondary School
- Type: National-type Chinese secondary school
- Motto: 自强不息 厚德载物; Usaha Asas Kejayaan
- Established: 21 July 1951
- Founder: Segamat Chinese community
- School district: Segamat
- Oversight: School Governing Board; Segamat district education department
- School code: JEB7030
- President: Datuk Ghai Soo Ming (School governing board)
- Chairman: Gan Eng Kim (PTA Chairman)
- Principal: Goh Jit Siang
- Teaching staff: 110
- Grades: Provision form - Sixth form
- Enrollment: 1574 (2022)
- Language: Chinese, English, Malay
- Campus: Rural,10 acres (40,000 m^{2}) (Tahang Rimau)
- Colours: Purple and White
- Accreditation: Sekolah cemerlang (Best school in Segamat district)
- Yearbook: '虎岗 (The Tahang Rimau)'
- Affiliations: Gabungan Persatuan Bekas Pelajar Sekolah Seg Hwa Segamat Malaysia
- Website: www.smjk.edu.my/school/index.php?schid=51
- Last updated: 13 November 2022

Sekolah Menengah Jenis Kebangsaan Seg Hwa, shortened SMJK Seg Hwa is a National-type Chinese secondary school located at Jalan Tahang Rimau, District of Segamat, Johor, Malaysia.

The school is well known for its symbolic clock tower, gigantic stone steps, Chinese pavilions and functional water fountain .

The clock tower, "Xi Yin Lou 惜阴楼", was a gift from the school 11th alumni. It was built in 1962 with an engraving of a famous Chinese poem by Tao Qian (陶渊明) from the Jin Dynasty:

"盛年不重来，一日难再晨; 及时当勉励，岁月不待人。"

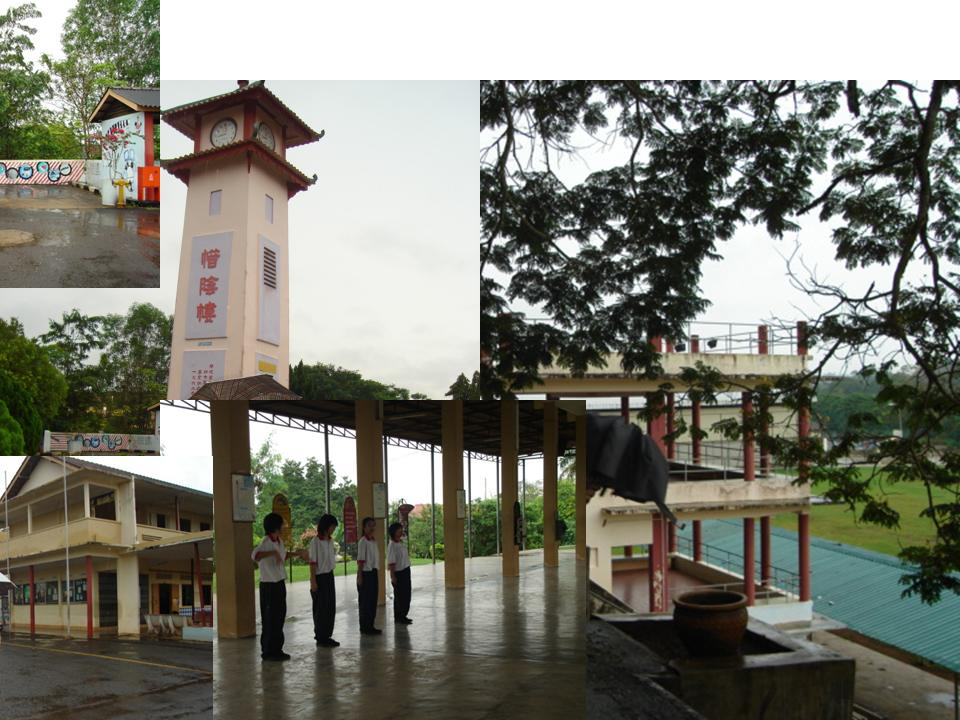
School compound

== History ==
The school originated in 1918 as Chong Cheng Primary School (now Sekolah Jenis Kebangsaan (Cina) Seg Hwa), established by local merchants and the Chinese community along Jalan Mentol in Segamat. Financial contributions allowed for the construction of a new building featuring eight classrooms in 1936.

Following the Second World War, the school expanded to include a secondary section and was consequently renamed Hwa Chiao Primary and Secondary School (Sekolah Menengah Rendah Hwa Chiao in Malay). Due to continuous growth in student enrollment, a new block of ten classrooms was added in 1950, though the issue of overcrowding persisted.

In 1954, the Board of Governors, along with the assistance of the Association of Rubber Merchants, established a building committee, which successfully secured a 10 acres (40,000 m^{2}) plot of land near Bukit Hampar, the school's current location, with the aid of the local assemblyman, YB Tuan Haji Noor. The secondary school officially separated in 1957, moving to the new site, where a 16-classroom block was constructed afterwards. It was named Sekolah Menengah Hwa Chiao, Bukit Hampar (Tahang Rimau), while the primary school remained at Jalan Mentol.

Concurrent with the independence of the Federation of Malaya, the school's administration accepted government funding and assistance in 1957. The secondary school was then renamed Hwa Chiao National Type Secondary School (Sekolah Menengah Jenis Kebangsaan Hwa Chiao). Due to ongoing classroom shortages, the school operated in two daily sessions—morning for upper secondary and afternoon for lower secondary—starting in 1959.

The Board of Governors officially changed the school's name in 1963 to Seg Hwa National Type Chinese Secondary School (Sekolah Menengah Jenis Kebangsaan Seg Hwa). This change was made because the term "Hwa Chiao" (meaning "Chinese abroad") was considered no longer appropriate for citizens of the newly independent nation; "Seg Hwa" was chosen to mean "the Chinese of Segamat."

== School Motto ==
The school's motto is presented in three languages:

Chinese: 自强不息 (Zì qiáng bù xī) | 厚德载物 (Hòu dé zài wù)

Malay: Usaha Asas Kejayaan (Effort is the Foundation of Success)

English (Combined Translation): Self-discipline and Social Commitment

The Chinese component of the motto, "自强不息 厚德载物," is also famously used by Tsinghua University (清华大学) and originates from the ancient classic I Ching (《易经》).

The full quote from the I Ching is:

"天行健，君子以自强不息。地势坤，君子以厚德载物。" (English: The movement of heaven is full of power. Thus the superior man makes himself strong and untiring. The capacity of the earth is to support and preserve. Thus the superior man sustains the outer world with broad virtue.)

=== Provision Form ===
Provision Form students attend the morning session. There are only two classes allocated for students at this level each year.

=== Lower Secondary Form ===
The Lower Secondary Forms consist of Form One, Form Two, and Form Three. Form One and Form Two students attend the afternoon session. Form Three students study in the morning session and typically sit for the Lower Secondary Assessment Test (Penilaian Menengah Rendah) examination at the end of the year.

=== Upper Secondary Form ===
The Upper Secondary Forms are Form Four and Form Five, both of which attend the morning session. The classes at this level are divided into Science and Arts streams, with typically four to five classes for each stream in every form. Form Five students sit for the Malaysian Certificate of Education (Sijil Pelajaran Malaysia) examination at the end of the year.

=== Sixth Form (Pre-University) ===
Sekolah Menengah Seg Hwa began offering Sixth Form (Pre-University) classes (Science stream) in 2006. However, only two classes—one Upper Sixth and one Lower Sixth—were allocated by the Education Department. Sixth Formers study for one and a half years before taking the Malaysian Higher School Certificate (Sijil Tinggi Persekolahan Malaysia) examination.

All Sixth Form students are members of the Pre-University Student Representatives Council (Malay: Majlis Perwakilan Pelajar-Pelajar Pra-Universiti). Its main annual activities include the orientation week for new Lower Sixth formers, field trips, graduation night, and other co-curricular activities.

==== Festing Stadium ====
In 1959, the then principal Tseng Hsi Kuei with the assistance of his former colleague General Festing, cleared 5 acres (20,000 m^{2}) of unused land of the school and converted the same into a sport stadium. The stadium was named after the General as "Festing Stadium". The stadium is now being used as football field.

==== Woo Seng Hwa Sports Stadium ====
In 2006, with the assistance of the Chinese community in the district of Segamat, a sports stadium is being constructed. This stadium is used as badminton courts, exhibition halls and other purposes. This stadium is named after the former Principal of the school Woo Seng Hwa.

=== Libraries ===
The old library, named "Woo Seng Hwa Library", is now for lower form secondary students usage. The library is for the students to study, read, borrow reading materials and use media like electronic dictionary and radios. In 2008, a new library was set up for the usage of Upper Secondary students as well as Sixth Formers.

=== Science laboratories ===
In 2007, new science laboratories for the Sixth Formers and Upper Secondary Science students were set up. The science labs include Physics, Chemistry and Biology Laboratories.

== School Anniversaries ==
=== Silver Jubilee ===
The school celebrated its silver jubilee in 1982 with a funfair and exhibitions. The then Deputy Minister of Education YB Tan Tiong Hong officially opened the new school three-storey science labs. A fund raising dinner was also organised.

=== Golden Jubilee ===
The school celebrated its golden jubilee on the 21 and 22 July 2001. The celebration was attended by the then Deputy Education Minister, Dato' Hon Choon Kim. The school also held a fund raising dinner attended by 3000 guests.

== Academic Achievements ==
The school has many "straight A" students in the Lower Secondary Assessment Test, Malaysian Certificate of Education. In 2008, the school was awarded "Pencapaian Perfect A Tertinggi" in the Segamat district by Segamat District Education Department for the 2007 SPM exam.

For Malaysian Higher School Certificate, the school get its first result on 2008. The school reach its target of 100% pass on the examinations. Two students got straight As in the 2007 Malaysian Higher School Certificate exam. The Johor state Education Department awarded the school "Sekolah Cemerlang Negeri Johor" (Preeminence School in Johor) for the 2007 STPM exam.

The recent announced 2008 SPM result, the school was ranked Third place in Johor state. Three students get 13A, ten students get 12A and eleven students get 11A. Amongst, 6 students get straight A1s in the exam.

Since the establishment of Sixth Form (Science), the school achieved 100% passes in the STPM examinations.

=== Co-curricular achievements ===
In 2009, the school's sport team won the grand championship of the 38th MSSM Sports Championship district of Segamat (Kejohanan Olahraga MSSM Segamat).
