= MUET =

MUET may refer to:

- Mehran University of Engineering and Technology, Jamshoro a public university in Pakistan
- Malaysian University English Test, a test of English language proficiency, largely for university admissions in Malaysia
