= Chong Hwa Secondary School =

School in Kuala Lumpur, Malaysia

Chong Hwa High School 吉隆坡中华国民型华文中学
- SMJK Chong Hwa KL (Chong Hwa NTSS KL)
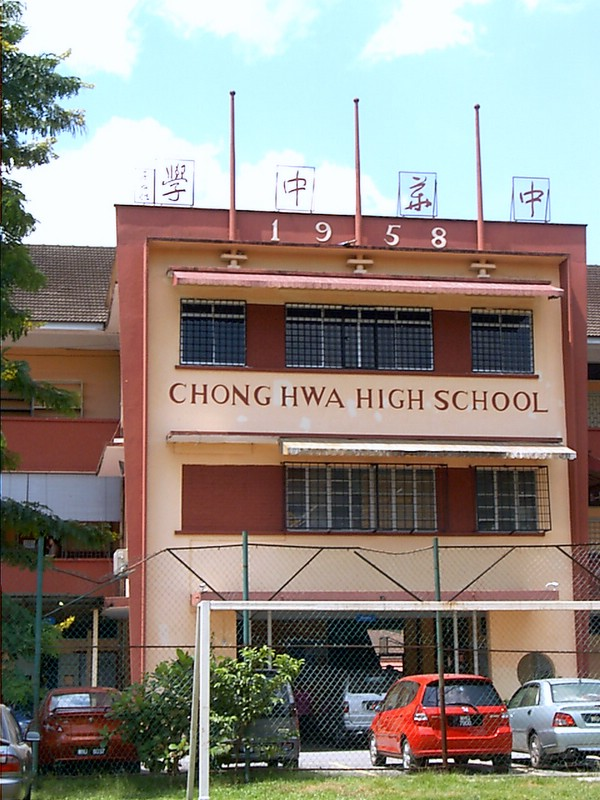

Location
- Jalan Gombak; Kuala Lumpur; Malaysia
- Coordinates: 3°11′57″N 101°42′16″E

Information
- Type: National-type Chinese secondary school
- Motto: Obedience; Bravery; Moral; Knowledgeable
- Established: 21 March 1919
- School code: WEB0247
- Principal: Tan Siew Choo
- Teaching staff: 120
- Enrollment: 2124 (2022)
- Colours: Yellow and blue ██
- National ranking: 56
- Yearbook: Chong Hwa Annual Magazine Publication (The CHAMP)
- Affiliation: Ministry of Education of Malaysia
- Website: http://www.smjk.edu.my/school/contact_us.php?schid=39
- Last updated: 13 November 2022

Chong Hwa High School
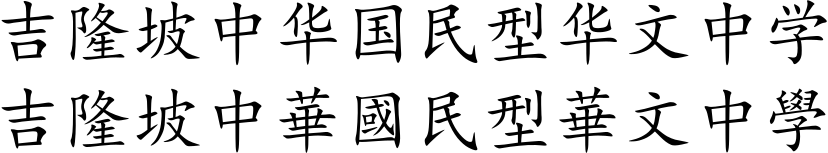
- Chong Hwa High School in Simplified Chinese (top) and Traditional Chinese character (below)
- Traditional Chinese: 吉隆坡中華國民型華文中學
- Simplified Chinese: 吉隆坡中华国民型华文中学
Transcriptions
Standard Mandarin
- Hanyu Pinyin: Zhōnghuá Guómínxíng Huáwén Zhōngxué
Yue: Cantonese
- Jyutping: Zung^{1} waa^{4} gwok^{3} man^{4} jing^{4} waa^{4} man^{4} zung^{1} hok^{6}

Chong Hwa National-Type Chinese Secondary School (吉隆坡中华国民型华文中学) is a national-type Chinese secondary school located at Jalan Gombak, Gombak, Kuala Lumpur.

== History ==
School History

Starting humbly with three rented double stories building in Jalan Genting Klang of Kuala Lumpur, the school was founded in 1919.

With increasing numbers of students, the Board of Directors raised funds to purchase the property land where the Chong Hwa Primary School is situated today. In 1922, the new campus was set with only four classrooms, an office and a library.

To accommodate the increasing number of students, a two-story brick building was built in 1938 and in the year of 1939, the first coeducation school was established and officially named as Selangor Chinese Primary & Secondary School. Mr. Liang Long Guang (梁龙光) was the first principal for the school. Soon after, the school anthem was composed with the aid of the music teacher, Mr. Chen Luo Han (陈洛汉).

The secondary school introduced both art and science streams and its reputation increased over time. The school has over 900 students with students from as far as Vietnam, Thailand and Indonesia.

In the year of 1940, Mr. Liu Jing Sheng (刘经生) was appointed as the principal after the resignation of Mr. Liang. Owing to the Education Act in that period of time, the secondary school has to be shifted to Jalan Gombak.

During the outbreak of the Pacific War in 1941, the school was forced to close down. The school was destroyed during the war and what was left were ruins. Books, instruments, teaching aids, and efforts over the years were all shattered.

After the retrocession of Malaya in 1945, the primary school was reopened on 1 November 1945, followed by the secondary school on 26 March 1946. The secondary school was temporarily set up on the field opposite to the primary school.

In the year of 1954, under the administration of Mr. Ye Shao Chun (叶少春), the school increased its size to 2,000 students. However, there were insufficient classrooms and the construction of the new campus could not be commenced. Thus in 1955, the secondary school had to temporarily borrow 16 classrooms from the primary school due to the growing numbers of students.

The new Gombak Road secondary school construction was then finally started in 1957 and was completed in July 1958. The school has then expanded to 30 classrooms and the number of students went up to more than a thousand and three hundred people. The primary school accepted the subsidies from the government and became a standard Chinese primary school. Hence, the secondary school was separated from it.

Four years later in 1962, the school was split into the Chinese Government Secondary School (SMJK Chong Hwa) and Chong Hwa Independent High School with each having the morning and afternoon session classes respectively. Mr. Chen Di Long (陈迪隆) was officially appointed as the principal of SMJK Chong Hwa in 1979.

In 1982, Chong Hwa Independent High School has then moved to Jalan Ipoh, while SMJK Chong Hwa remains in Jalan Gombak. From there on, the school continued to grow. Computer classes were first introduced in the year of 1985 along with the organisation of the Students' Federation to encourage students and school staff to work together to foster the spirit of autonomy and willingness, preventing adverse social influence to the students while eventually improving the quality of the students.

Along the year, the school has constantly improved to enrich the students and in 1994 three air-conditioned auditoriums were set up to provide a better schooling environment.

On 8 September 1994, Mr. Li Yu Chai (黎煜才) was appointed as the acting principal after the retirement of Mr. Chen Di Long. Mr. Chen Bao Wu (陈宝武) then officially took up the position of the school principal in 1995.

In 1999, in order to accommodate the Form Six students, the school has prepared four comfortable air-conditioned classrooms to provide the students with a proper environment for study. At the same year, the school has also refurbished the basketball courts, which were used for school activities. On 16 October 1999, Mr. Zhou Fu Chai (周福彩) was appointed as the school principal after the retirement of Mr Chen Bao Wu on 8 August that year.

Mr. Zhou Fu Chai has brought SMJK Chong Hwa to yet another reputable standard in his eight years of serving as the school principal. He then retired on 19 April 19, 2008 and Ms. Liu Yue Yao (刘玥瑶) was appointed as the next, and also the first, female principal in the school.

Ms. Liu was then transferred to SMK La Salle, Sentul on 23 August 2009, then replaced by Mr. Leong Kum Loy (梁金来). Unfortunately, Mr. Leong is not fluent in Chinese and thus, he was then transferred to SMK St.John on 15 November 2009. On 16 November 2009, Mr. Chai Chit Chuen (蔡植群) was appointed as the school principal and served the school until 14 March 2014. He was succeeded by Mr. Goh Chee Chiang (吴志强) on 17 March 2014.

During Mr. Goh's term of office, much progress was made in term of the school developments. With the guidance and assistance of the school Board of Directors, much progress was made in term of the school physical and infrastructure developments. The building of the school multi purpose hall and classrooms below it was completed in 2016. In 2017 Chong Hwa NTSS successfully applied for single session school and also allowed to participate in the DLP Program (Dual Language Program) for the teaching and learning of STEM subjects in English. The academic and co-curriculum performance has also shown tremendous improvement especially in the Sijil Pelajaran Malaysia (SPM) examinations. The percentage of SPM examination qualifiers (with Malay Language & History subjects passes) has improved from 72% in 2014 to more than 91% in 2019.

== See also ==
- Education in Malaysia
- List of schools in Malaysia
- Chong Hwa Independent High School, Kuala Lumpur
