= Batu Lintang National Secondary School =

Public secondary school in Kuching, Sarawak, Malaysia

- Sekolah Menengah Kebangsaan Batu Lintang

Location
- Jalan College, 93200 Kuching, Sarawak; Kuching, Sarawak; Malaysia; 1.532627°N 110.347654°E

Information
- Type: Co-Ed public secondary school
- Motto: Berilmu Berkhidmat "Serve with knowledge"
- Established: 1977
- Session: Double
- School code: YEE1204
- Principal: Ms. Angela Bong Yan Yan
- Colours: Black, yellow, white, blue, red
- Website: www.smkbl.net

Batu Lintang National Secondary School (Malay: Sekolah Menengah Kebangsaan Batu Lintang, abbreviation SMKBL) is a public secondary school located in Jalan College, Batu Lintang, Kuching, Sarawak, Malaysia.

== History ==
Batu Lintang National Secondary School, Kuching started public service as a government school in 1977 with 13 teachers and 320 students in its opening year. During that year, there were only two class forms: Transition and Form 1. Two years later, the school was resituated at a temporary building in Jalan College. Currently, the aforementioned temporary building is in active use as a school for the blind, SMK Pendidikan Khas. Forms 2 and 3 had already been introduced by this time, supporting its students up till the PMR mass examinations.

In 1982, Batu Lintang National Secondary School offered Form 4 classes. By the following year, SPM examinations were held there for Form 5 students. Similarly, in the year 1988 and 1989, Lower Form 6 classes and STPM exams were offered, respectively. However, the classes and exams at this level were limited to the Literature stream; the Science stream classes were only available by the year 2003.

The Special Education Integrated Programme (Vision Impaired) was introduced in the school's system in 1986, allowing visually-impaired students (or resource students) to study in the least restrictive environment possible. As such, resource rooms containing Braille typewriters and dedicated teaching materials are provided to these students. The programme is currently active in this school's system.

As of 2012, there were 127 teachers, 17 non-teaching staff and 1591 students taking part in the various academic and co-curricular activities under the school's banner. By percentage, 54.81% of the students were Chinese, 43.68% were Bumiputera, 1.01% were Indian and the remaining 0.50% were of other ethnicities.

== List of Principals ==
- 1977-1978 : Martin Chai
- 1978-1981 : Wong Sze Yong
- 1981-1984 : Paul Teo
- 1984-1985 : Ahmad Sabu
- 1985-1986 : Ahmad Hamdan
- 1987-1989 : Tuan Haji Mohd Zain Bin. Abang Ismail
- 1990-1992 : Tuan Haji Morshidi Ali
- 1992-1993 : Awang Bohli Awang Mohd Zain
- 1994-1997 (June) : Wang Chang Chung
- 1997 (June)-2003 : Tuan Haji Mohd Zain Bin. Abang Ismail
- 2004-2006 : Jaidah Bte. Haji Alek
- 2006-2007 (June) : Faridah Abdullah
- 2007-2008 (March): Fiziah Abdullah (Acting Principal)
- 2008-2012 : Tuan Haji Mohammad Syariff Affendy Bin. Matjeraie
- 2012-2016 : Puan Hajah Saftuyah binti Haji Adenan
- 2016 (December) : Puan Png Hellon (Acting Principal)
- 2017(January–February) : Puan Png Hellon (Acting Principal)
- 2017(March)-2021(October): Bahtiar Bin Afandi
- 2021(November)-2023 (Disember): Puan Hadiah Binti Amit
- 2024 (Januari)-sekarang : Angela Bong Yan Yan

== See also ==
- Education in Malaysia
