= Malacca Chinese High School =

Secondary school in Melaka, Malaysia

- Sekolah Menengah Jenis Kebangsaan Tinggi Cina Melaka 马六甲华文国民型高等中学

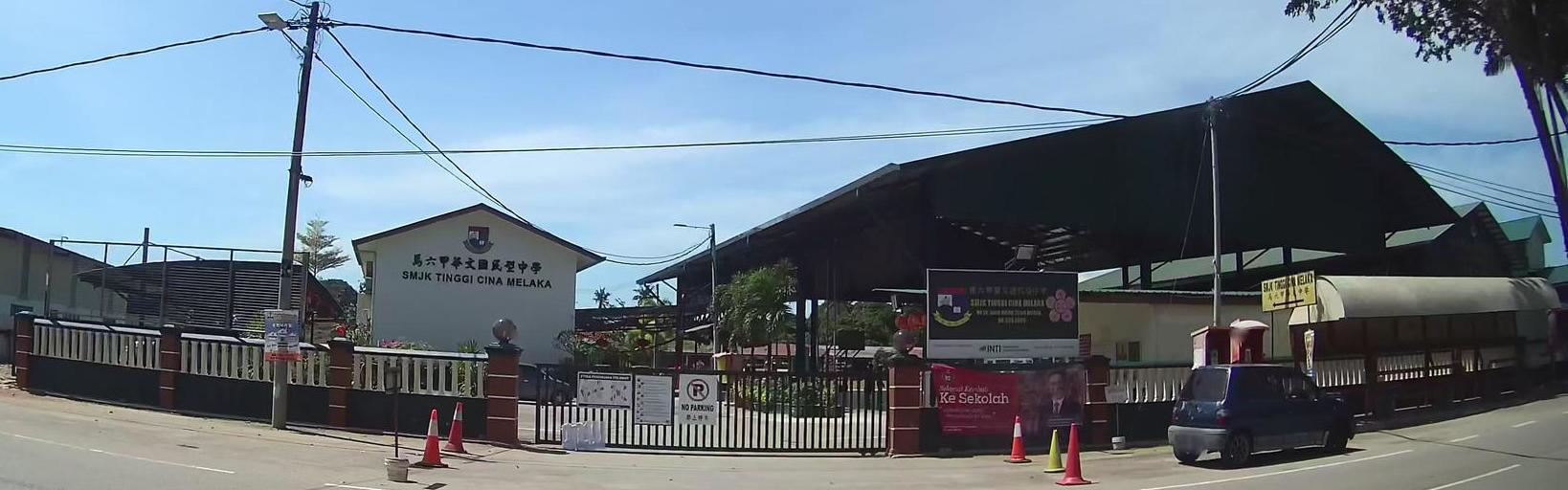
- School entrance

Location
- 28, Jalan Malim; Malacca, 75250; Malaysia; 2.220848470761°N 102.2363313042°E

Information
- Type: National-type Chinese secondary school
- Established: 15 February 1960
- Founder: Mr. Lim Sian Soon
- Status: Operating
- School district: Central Malacca
- Educational authority: PPD Melaka Tengah
- School code: MEB2104
- Principal: Peong Poh Boon
- Teaching staff: 63
- Forms: 1 to 5
- Age range: 13-18
- Enrollment: 1223 (2022)
- Classes offered: Pure Science (Biology, Chemistry, Physics) Accounting Economics Chinese Literature
- Language: Malay, Chinese, English
- Yearbook: 宇光 Quasar
- Website: www.smjk.edu.my/school/index.php?schid=47
- Last updated: 4 August 2026

Malacca Chinese High School
- Malacca Chinese High School in Simplified Chinese (top) and Traditional Chinese character (below)
- Traditional Chinese: 馬六甲華文國民型高等中學
- Simplified Chinese: 马六甲华文国民型高等中学
Transcriptions
Standard Mandarin
- Hanyu Pinyin: Mǎliùjiǎ Huáwén Guómínxíng Gāoděng Zhōngxué

Malacca Chinese High School is a National-type Chinese secondary school located at Malim Road in Malacca, Malaysia. Its native Malay name is Sekolah Menengah Jenis Kebangsaan Tinggi Cina Melaka.

== History ==
The school was founded on 15 February 1960, and only has 40 students in total at the time. 2 January 1961, the school moved to 28, Malim Road. The land was bought and donated it to the school as the school ground, and the name of the school was changed to Malacca Chinese High School. On 15 January 1962, a school building consisting nine classrooms and an office was completed. In the same year, it was reorganized into a National-type Chinese Secondary School, which was renamed Sekolah Menengah Jenis Kebangsaan Tinggi Cina Melaka. On 15 September 2011, the school held a banquet to celebrate the completion of the large-scale construction project and the opening ceremony of the Gan Boon Leong Hall. In August 2023, the school started to raise funds for the construction of a new three-story school building and canteen, with a target of 3 million ringgit, the construction application has been submitted to the city council.
