= National-type Chinese secondary school =

Type of secondary school in Malaysia

- Sekolah Menengah Jenis Kebangsaan Cina 国民型华文中学
- Malaysia

Information
- Type: Public, Secondary school
- Grades: Remove, Form 1 – Form 6
- Language: Malay, English, Chinese
- Affiliations: Ministry of Education (Malaysia)
- Website: https://www.smjk.my/

Chinese name
- Traditional Chinese: 國民型華文中學
- Simplified Chinese: 国民型华文中学
Transcriptions
Standard Mandarin
- Hanyu Pinyin: Guómínxíng Huáwén Zhōngxué
Yue: Cantonese
- Yale Romanization: gwok m̀hn yìhng wàh màhn jūng hohk
- Jyutping: gwok^{3} man^{4} jing^{4} waa^{4} man^{4} zung^{1} hok^{6}
Southern Min
- Hokkien POJ: Kok-bîn-hîng Hoâ-bûn Tiong-ha̍k
- Tâi-lô: Kok-bîn-hîng Huâ-bûn Tiong-ha̍k

A national-type Chinese secondary school (Malay: Sekolah Menengah Jenis Kebangsaan Cina; Chinese: 国民型华文中学; abbreviated SMJK(C)) is an institution in Malaysia that provides secondary education. Such school is government-assisted and uses Malay as the primary medium of instructions. Such schools originated from privately established Chinese-medium secondary schools.

Between 1956 and 1962, many of these schools accepted a government-led restructuring proposal and were incorporated into the national education system. As a result, they became distinct from Chinese independent secondary schools (Chinese: 华文独立中学), which chose to remain outside the national system.

Privately run Chinese secondary schools that declined restructuring remained unsubsidised, retained full autonomy, and were not administered by the Ministry of Education. As a result of the restructuring process, a number of independent schools bearing identical or similar names were later established to accommodate students who did not enter the restructured schools. These institutions subsequently became collectively known as Chinese independent secondary schools.

National-type Chinese secondary schools receive annual operational grants from the Ministry of Education, excluding development funding. School administration, including curriculum implementation, staffing, and student intake, is overseen by the Ministry of Education of Malaysia. School boards are constituted in accordance with ministerial requirements, although ownership of school land generally remains with the original trustees or community organisations.

A defining feature of SMJK is the inclusion of Chinese language as a core subject within the formal curriculum. Chinese is also a compulsory and examinable subject in the Sijil Pelajaran Malaysia (SPM), reflecting assurances provided by the government during the restructuring process. To preserve their historical Chinese-school character, student intake at SMJK primarily consists of graduates from national-type Chinese primary schools (Malay: Sekolah Jenis Kebangsaan (Cina); abbreviated: SJKC). Many schools continue pre-restructuring traditions of Chinese schools such as school mottos, anthems, and emblems.

== History ==
=== Background to restructuring ===
After 1920s, colonial authorities in British Malaya required schools of all streams to register in order to qualify for partial subsidies. Chinese-medium schools gradually developed within this regulatory framework. Prior to World War II, government funding was primarily directed toward English-medium schools that trained civil servants, while schools of other language streams were established and financed by ethnic communities.

The Japanese occupation of Malaya in 1942 led to the closure of most Chinese schools. After the war, schools gradually resumed operations and expanded from primary-level institutions to include secondary education. During the 1930s and 1940s, most Chinese secondary schools offered only lower secondary education. By the time of Malayan independence in 1957, more than 60 Chinese secondary schools were in operation nationwide.

Following political developments in China after 1949 and amid Cold War concerns, the colonial government declared a state of emergency in 1948 and restricted the recruitment of teachers from China. Educational standardisation became a policy priority. The Barnes Report of 1950 promoted English-medium education and recommended altering the character of vernacular schools. In 1952, the government introduced a salary-based funding scheme that provided financial assistance while increasing administrative oversight.

The 1954 Education White Paper proposed converting Chinese schools into national schools and further implementing the Education Ordinance of 1952. These proposals were opposed by Chinese education leaders, notably the United Chinese School Teachers’ Association led by Lim Lian Geok. On 7 December 1956, the government issued directives requiring Chinese secondary schools to adopt English as the medium of instruction.

Schools that accepted restructuring were referred to in English as “Conforming Schools” (CS), a term later translated as “national-type Secondary schools” (Sekolah Menengah Jenis Kebangsaan, SMJK) to distinguish them from independent schools and fully government-run national secondary schools (SMK). This designation was also officially rendered as “National-Type School”, as opposed to “National School”, which referred to standard government schools.

=== Financial incentives and implementation ===
In the post-war period, economic hardship placed significant strain on privately funded Chinese secondary schools. The government promoted restructuring by offering financial assistance and assuming responsibility for staff salaries and administrative costs. In 1956, Penang Chung Ling High School became the first Chinese secondary school to accept government aid, followed by Chan Wa High School in Negeri Sembilan in 1957 and Segamat Chinese High School in Johor in 1958. The restructuring process attracted criticism from segments of the Chinese community, while the government relied on financial incentives and political advocacy to accelerate implementation.

The Rahman Talib Report of 1960 recommended converting all vernacular schools into national schools. The Education Act 1961 institutionalised this policy. The government promoted the perceived advantages of restructuring through media and political channels, including reduced school fees, teacher welfare provisions, and assurances that Chinese language instruction would be retained for part of the curriculum.

From 1962 onwards, Chinese secondary education in Malaysia became divided into two main streams:

1. Chinese independent secondary schools, which rejected restructuring and retained Chinese as the medium of instruction.
2. National-type Chinese secondary schools (SMJK), which adopted English (later Malay) as the medium of instruction while retaining Chinese-language subjects and community-based school boards.

By 1962, 57 Chinese secondary schools had completed restructuring. Following the formation of Malaysia in 1963 and the inclusion of Sabah and Sarawak, the total number of SMJK increased to 78.

=== Academic structure after restructuring ===
Restructured schools adopted a five-year secondary system. Lower secondary comprised Forms One to Three, followed by upper secondary Forms Four and Five. Graduates of Chinese primary schools were required to complete a preparatory year to transition from Chinese-medium instruction to English, and later Malay. Students sat for the Lower Certificate of Education (LCE) and the Malaysian Certificate of Education (MCE). Chinese-language examinations continued to be conducted in Chinese.

Following language policy changes in the 1980s, Malay became the principal medium of instruction, except for Chinese and English subjects. Examination systems were later revised, with lower secondary students sitting for the Penilaian Menengah Rendah (PMR) and upper secondary students for the Sijil Pelajaran Malaysia (SPM).

=== Developments since the 1990s ===
The Education Act 1961 classified schools into four categories, including National-Type secondary schools. However, the Education Act 1996 removed the “National-Type secondary school” category, reclassifying all government secondary schools as national secondary schools (SMK). Despite this, SMJK continued to use their designation administratively.

From the 1990s onwards, SMJK faced challenges related to staffing and administration. In some cases, principals without Chinese-language proficiency were appointed, prompting concern among school communities. In 1994, principals of SMJK established the Malaysian Council of Principals of SMJK, which was later recognized by the Ministry of Education. The council aimed to safeguard the interests of SMJK and ensure Chinese-language competence among administrators and teachers.

== Development ==
From the 1960s, SMJK initially used English as the medium of instruction, with Chinese and Malay taught as compulsory subjects. Beginning in 1972, the Ministry of Education gradually replaced English with Malay as the medium of instruction, a process completed by 1978. Throughout these changes, Chinese remained a compulsory and examinable subject.

In 2003, the ministry introduced a policy to teach science and mathematics in English. This policy was later replaced in 2012 by the Dual Language Programme (DLP). Initially, many SMJK were excluded from the programme. Following advocacy by SMJK organisations, the ministry expanded the program to include more national-type Chinese secondary schools.

Under the Education Act 1996, all government secondary schools are officially classified as national secondary schools (Sekolah Menengah Kebangsaan, SMK). Following negotiations by the Council of Principals, the Ministry of Education agreed that SMJK could continue to use the designation “Sekolah Menengah Jenis Kebangsaan (SMJK)” for administrative purposes.

== Characteristics ==
According to statistical data from 2010, approximately 20% of graduates from national-type Chinese primary schools (Sekolah Jenis Kebangsaan Cina, SJKC) continued their secondary education at national-type Chinese secondary schools (SMJK). At the same time, a combined total of 65 Chinese independent secondary schools and 81 national-type Chinese secondary schools enrolled about 30% of Chinese primary school graduates nationwide, while the remaining students primarily entered national secondary schools or international schools. These figures have been cited in discussions of the role of SMJK within Malaysia’s Chinese-language education landscape.

While implementing the national curriculum prescribed by the Ministry of Education, national-type Chinese secondary schools retain Chinese-language-related subjects within their formal curriculum. Due to their student intake patterns, SMJK attract students from different ethnic backgrounds and have developed an educational environment in which Mandarin and Malay are commonly used in parallel on campus.

=== Language policy ===
Under "Malaysia Education Blueprint 2013-2025", Malay is the official medium of instruction in national-type Chinese secondary schools (SMJK), consistent with the classification of all government secondary schools as national secondary schools. Mandarin and English are taught as subjects within the formal curriculum, with Chinese commonly designated as a core subject in SMJK.

Chinese language instruction in SMJK typically involves more instructional periods than in national secondary schools, reflecting historical assurances made during the restructuring of Chinese secondary schools in the late 1950s and early 1960s. Chinese is an examinable subject in the Sijil Pelajaran Malaysia (SPM), and most SMJK make it as compulsory and require every students to register for the subject.

=== Cultural background ===
National-type Chinese secondary schools retain certain institutional features inherited from their origins as Chinese-medium secondary schools, including the continued use of Chinese in some school activities and communications alongside Malay.

=== Administration ===
National-type Chinese secondary schools are administered by the Ministry of Education of Malaysia, which oversees curriculum implementation, staffing, and student admissions. School boards continue to exist in accordance with ministerial regulations, although their roles are generally limited to advisory functions, fundraising, and the management of board-administered assets such as school land. While there is no statutory requirement for principals of SMJK to possess Chinese-language qualifications, some school communities and organisations have expressed the view that Chinese-language proficiency among school administrators facilitates communication with boards of governors, parents, and alumni.

== Issues and debates ==
=== Governance and funding ===
Following the restructuring of Chinese secondary schools, the role of school boards in SMJK has been progressively reduced, with administrative authority increasingly centralised under the Ministry of Education. School boards today generally function in advisory and fundraising capacities. Government operational allocations support daily expenses, while development and infrastructure costs are often supplemented through board-led fundraising, a situation described by some school organisations as financially constraining.

=== Language and staffing ===
SMJK have faced ongoing challenges related to staffing, particularly in the recruitment of qualified Chinese-language teachers. In some cases, administrative appointments have involved principals without Chinese-language proficiency, which has prompted concern among school communities. These issues have been discussed by education stakeholders in the context of maintaining Chinese-language instruction within the national school system.

== List of national-type Chinese secondary schools ==
No	State	Malay name	Chinese name	Year established
1	Johor	Sekolah Menengah Jenis Kebangsaan Pai Chee	培智国民型华文中学	1958
2	Johor	Sekolah Menengah Jenis Kebangsaan Pei Hwa	培华国民型华文中学	1949
3	Johor	Sekolah Menengah Jenis Kebangsaan Seg Hwa	昔华国民型华文中学	1950
4	Malacca	Sekolah Menengah Jenis Kebangsaan Katholik Melaka	马六甲公教国民型华文中学	1958
5	Malacca	Sekolah Menengah Jenis Kebangsaan Notre Dame Convent	圣母女子国民型华文中学	1960
6	Malacca	Sekolah Menengah Jenis Kebangsaan Yok Bin	育民国民型华文中学	1947
7	Malacca	Sekolah Menengah Jenis Kebangsaan Tinggi Cina Melaka	马六甲华文国民型高等中学	1960
8	Malacca	Sekolah Menengah Jenis Kebangsaan Pulau Sebang	普罗士邦国民型华文中学	1961
9	Negeri Sembilan	Sekolah Menengah Jenis Kebangsaan Chan Wa	振华国民型华文中学	1935
10	Negeri Sembilan	Sekolah Menengah Jenis Kebangsaan Chan Wa II	振华二校国民型华文中学	2005
11	Negeri Sembilan	Sekolah Menengah Jenis Kebangsaan Chi Wen	启文国民型华文中学	1957
12	Negeri Sembilan	Sekolah Menengah Jenis Kebangsaan Chung Hua Kuala Pilah	中华国民型华文中学	1948
13	Kuala Lumpur	Sekolah Menengah Jenis Kebangsaan Confucian	尊孔国民型华文中学	1906
14	Kuala Lumpur	Sekolah Menengah Jenis Kebangsaan Chong Hwa Kuala Lumpur	吉隆坡中华国民型华文中学	1919
15	Selangor	Sekolah Menengah Jenis Kebangsaan Chung Hwa Klang	巴生中华国民型华文中学	1929
16	Selangor	Sekolah Menengah Jenis Kebangsaan Kwang Hua Klang	巴生光华国民型华文中学	1955
17	Selangor	Sekolah Menengah Jenis Kebangsaan Katholik Petaling Jaya	八打灵公教国民型华文中学	1956
18	Selangor	Sekolah Menengah Jenis Kebangsaan Yu Hua	育华国民型华文中学	1918
19	Selangor	Sekolah Menengah Jenis Kebangsaan Yoke Kuan	育群国民型华文中学	1959
20	Perak	Sekolah Menengah Jenis Kebangsaan Choong Hua	美罗中华国民型华文中学	1955
21	Perak	Sekolah Menengah Jenis Kebangsaan Katholik	丹绒马林公教国民型华文中学	1959
22	Perak	Sekolah Menengah Jenis Kebangsaan Nan Hwa	南华国民型华文中学	1935
23	Perak	Sekolah Menengah Jenis Kebangsaan Dindings	天定国民型华文中学	1954
24	Perak	Sekolah Menengah Jenis Kebangsaan Ayer Tawar	爱大华国民型华文中学	1959
25	Perak	Sekolah Menengah Jenis Kebangsaan Perempuan Perak	霹雳女子国民型华文中学	1932
26	Perak	Sekolah Menengah Jenis Kebangsaan Ave Maria Convent	圣母玛利亚国民型华文中学	1948
27	Perak	Sekolah Menengah Jenis Kebangsaan Sam Tet	三德国民型华文中学	1952
28	Perak	Sekolah Menengah Jenis Kebangsaan Poi Lam	培南国民型华文中学	1955
29	Perak	Sekolah Menengah Jenis Kebangsaan Yuk Choy	育才国民型华文中学	1924
30	Perak	Sekolah Menengah Jenis Kebangsaan Yuk Kwan	育群国民型华文中学	1934
31	Perak	Sekolah Menengah Jenis Kebangsaan Pei Yuan	培元国民型华文中学	1941
32	Perak	Sekolah Menengah Jenis Kebangsaan Krian	吉辇国民型华文中学	1959
33	Perak	Sekolah Menengah Jenis Kebangsaan Tsung Wah	崇华国民型华文中学	1952
34	Perak	Sekolah Menengah Jenis Kebangsaan Shing Chung	兴中国民型华文中学	1923
35	Perak	Sekolah Menengah Jenis Kebangsaan San Min	三民国民型华文中学	1929
36	Perak	Sekolah Menengah Jenis Kebangsaan Hua Lian	华联国民型华文中学	1947
37	Kelantan	Sekolah Menengah Jenis Kebangsaan Chung Cheng	中正国民型华文中学	1959
38	Kelantan	Sekolah Menengah Jenis Kebangsaan Chung Hwa	中华国民型华文中学	1934
39	Kedah	Sekolah Menengah Jenis Kebangsaan Keat Hwa	吉华国民型华文中学	1911
40	Kedah	Sekolah Menengah Jenis Kebangsaan Keat Hwa II	吉华国民型华文中学二校	1985
41	Kedah	Sekolah Menengah Jenis Kebangsaan Sin Min	新民国民型华文中学	1957
42	Kedah	Sekolah Menengah Jenis Kebangsaan Chio Min	觉民国民型华文中学	1957
43	Penang	Sekolah Menengah Jenis Kebangsaan Jit Sin	日新国民型华文中学	1919
44	Penang	Sekolah Menengah Jenis Kebangsaan Perempuan China Pulau Pinang	槟华女子国民型华文中学	1921
45	Penang	Sekolah Menengah Jenis Kebangsaan Chung Ling	锺灵国民型华文中学	1917
46	Penang	Sekolah Menengah Jenis Kebangsaan Chung Hwa Confucian	孔圣庙中华国民型华文中学	1921
47	Penang	Sekolah Menengah Jenis Kebangsaan Heng Ee	恒毅国民型华文中学	1957
48	Penang	Sekolah Menengah Jenis Kebangsaan Phor Tay	菩提国民型华文中学	1954
49	Penang	Sekolah Menengah Jenis Kebangsaan Convent Datuk Keramat	柑仔园修道院国民型华文中学	1947
50	Penang	Sekolah Menengah Jenis Kebangsaan Union	协和国民型华文中学	1928
51	Penang	Sekolah Menengah Jenis Kebangsaan Sacred Heart	圣心国民型华文中学	1956
52	Penang	Sekolah Menengah Jenis Kebangsaan Chung Ling Butterworth	北海锺灵国民型华文中学	1986
53	Penang	Sekolah Menengah Jenis Kebangsaan Jit Sin II	威南日新国民型华文中学	2017
54	Penang	Sekolah Menengah Jenis Kebangsaan Heng Ee Cawangan Bayan Baru	恒毅国民型华文中学峇央峇鲁分校	2017
55	Terengganu	Sekolah Menengah Jenis Kebangsaan Chung Hwa Wei Sin	中华维新国民型华文中学	1949
56	Pahang	Sekolah Menengah Jenis Kebangsaan Katholik Bentong	文冬公教国民型华文中学	1957
57	Pahang	Sekolah Menengah Jenis Kebangsaan Khai Mun	文冬启文国民型华文中学	-
58	Pahang	Sekolah Menengah Jenis Kebangsaan Chung Hwa Kuala Lipis	立卑中华国民型华文中学	-
59	Pahang	Sekolah Menengah Jenis Kebangsaan Tanah Puteh	丹那布爹国民型华文中学	1952
60	Pahang	Sekolah Menengah Jenis Kebangsaan Chung Ching	中竞国民型华文中学	1947
61	Pahang	Sekolah Menengah Jenis Kebangsaan Hwa Lian	文德甲华联国民型华文中学	1958
62	Pahang	Sekolah Menengah Jenis Kebangsaan Triang	直凉国民型华文中学	1955
63	Sarawak	Sekolah Menengah Jenis Kebangsaan Tinggi Kuching	古晋国民型华文中学	1916
64	Sarawak	Sekolah Menengah Jenis Kebangsaan Tiong Hin	中兴国民型华文中学	1917
65	Sarawak	Sekolah Menengah Jenis Kebangsaan Tung Hua	敦化国民型华文中学	1922
66	Sarawak	Sekolah Menengah Jenis Kebangsaan Chung Hua Sibu	中华国民型华文中学	1907
67	Sarawak	Sekolah Menengah Jenis Kebangsaan Chung Cheng Sibu	中正国民型华文中学	1917
68	Sarawak	Sekolah Menengah Jenis Kebangsaan Kwong Hua Middle	光华国民型华文中学	1916
69	Sarawak	Sekolah Menengah Jenis Kebangsaan Chung Hua Miri	中华国民型华文中学	1952
70	Sarawak	Sekolah Menengah Jenis Kebangsaan Tinggi Sarikei	泗里街高级国民型华文中学	1926
71	Sarawak	Sekolah Menengah Jenis Kebangsaan Kai Chung	开中国民型华文中学	1953
72	Sarawak	Sekolah Menengah Jenis Kebangsaan Tong Hua	东华国民型华文中学	1930
73	Sabah	Sekolah Menengah Jenis Kebangsaan Ken Hwa	根华国民型华文中学	1968
74	Sabah	Sekolah Menengah Jenis Kebangsaan Chung Hwa Tenom	丹南中华国民型华文中学	1950
75	Sabah	Sekolah Menengah Jenis Kebangsaan Tiong Hua Sandakan	山打根中华国民型华文中学	1938
76	Sabah	Sekolah Menengah Jenis Kebangsaan Sung Siew	双修国民型华文中学	1907
77	Sabah	Sekolah Menengah Jenis Kebangsaan Tinggi Kota Kinabalu	亚庇国民型华文中学	1949
78	Sabah	Sekolah Menengah Jenis Kebangsaan Shan Tao	善导国民型华文中学	1967
79	Sabah	Sekolah Menengah Jenis Kebangsaan Lok Yuk Likas	乐育国民型华文中学	1934
80	Sabah	Sekolah Menengah Jenis Kebangsaan Lok Yuk Kudat	古达乐育国民型华文中学	-
81	Selangor	Sekolah Menengah Jenis Kebangsaan Yu Hua II Kajang	加影育华国民型华文中学二校	2021
