= Keat Hwa Secondary School =

School in Alor Setar, Kedah, Malaysia

Keat Hwa National Type Chinese Secondary School
- 吉华国民型华文中学; Sekolah Menengah Jenis Kebangsaan Cina Keat Hwa

Location
- Kuala Kedah Road; Alor Setar, Kedah; Malaysia; 6.097303°N 100.357824°E

Information
- Type: National-type Chinese secondary school
- Motto: 礼义廉耻 (Honesty and Honour)
- Established: 1911
- Founder: A group of local Chinese
- School district: Kota Setar
- Oversight: 13 acres (5.3 ha)
- board of directors: Ir.Chua Teik Seng
- Principal: Mr Ching Kang Beng
- Teaching staff: 130 approx.
- Nickname: Keat Hwaians
- Gender: Co-educational
- Enrollment: 2500 approx.
- Campus: Alor Setar
- Colours: Red, blue, white, yellow
- Nickname: Keat Hwa
- Rival: Sultan Abdul Hamid College
- Accreditation: Cluster School
- Affiliation: Keat Hwa High School; Keat Hwa II Secondary School
- Medium of Language: English, Chinese, Malay
- Main Feature: The recognition of the mother tongue education – the Chinese Education
- School Code: KEB2094
- Website: www.smjkkeathwa.edu.my www.smkh.edu.my www.smjk.edu.my keathwa.org

Chinese name
- Traditional Chinese: 吉 華 國 民 型 華 文 中 學
- Simplified Chinese: 吉 华 国 民 型 华 文 中 学
- Literal meaning: Keat Hwa National Type Chinese Secondary School
Transcriptions
Standard Mandarin
- Hanyu Pinyin: Jíhuá Guómínxíng Huáwén Zhōngxué
Southern Min
- Hokkien POJ: Keât Huá Kok-bîn-hêng Hoa-bûn Tiong-o̍k

Malay name
- Malay: Sekolah Menengah Jenis Kebangsaan Keat Hwa

Keat Hwa Secondary School, officially the Keat Hwa National Type Chinese Secondary School (Malay: Sekolah Menengah Jenis Kebangsaan Cina Keat Hwa, (SMJK Keat Hwa) simplified Chinese: 吉华国民型华文中学; traditional Chinese: 吉華國民型華文中學; pinyin: Jíhuá Guómínxíng Huáwén Zhōngxué; Pe̍h-ōe-jī: Keât Huá tiong ouk) is a cluster National-type Chinese secondary school in Alor Setar, Kedah, Malaysia which provides secondary education.

It was founded in 1911, making it one of the oldest schools in Malaysia. It has an area of 13 acres (5.3 ha). Keat Hwa Secondary School is widely known as Keat Hwa in the region, and it is one of the only 81 Chinese conforming (national-type) secondary schools in Malaysia.

One of the features which makes the Keat Hwa Secondary School special from other typical secondary schools in Malaysia is that all students with Chinese primary school background are required to learn Chinese language and to sit for Chinese language examination in major examinations like Lower Secondary Assessment and Malaysian Certificate of Education.

In 2011, Keat Hwa celebrated its 100th anniversary with three-day celebration seeing more than 35,000 Kedah Chinese and exstudents/alumni around the world participating in the events. The Keat Hwa 100 celebration is also being recorded in the Malaysian Book of Records.

As a Chinese Secondary School, the teaching of Science and Mathematics are in English. Following the announcement of the Malaysian Deputy Prime Minister, who is also the Education Minister, on 4 November 2011, the Keat Hwa Secondary School would have the options to teach Science and Mathematics fully in English, Bahasa Malaysia, or bilingually. However, majority of the parents wanted their children to be taught Science and Mathematics in English.

== History ==
Keat Hwa Secondary School was first established in the year 1911 and named as (Simplified Chinese: 中华学校) after a name change from Chung Hwa School.

=== 1924 ===
In response to the rapid increase in the number of people and the need for self-built school buildings, the school building committee was organized to start preparations to donate.

=== 1928 ===
After four years of hard work, a bungalow in Jalan Kampung Perak near the Kedah River was purchased as a school building.

=== 1935 ===
The merge of 3 school.

=== 1939 ===
After the school started the first class of form one secondary school, it has been named Hua Qiao Primary and Secondary School (Simplified Chinese: 中桥中小学校).

=== 1945 ===
School Re-Open again after Japanese invasion of Malaya.

=== 1953 ===
New Campus at Kampung Baru as the main campus and Kampung Perak as the branch campus with nearly 2,000 students, it become the largest Chinese School in Kedah.

=== 1958 ===
After receiving the government subsidies, the primary and secondary schools are instructed to operate separately. The secondary school is named Hua Qiao Secondary School, 1000 over students. The primary schools are divided into 3 schools named Hua Qiao (H) Primary School (Simplified Chinese: 华侨标准型(H)小学）, Hua Qiao (K) Primary School (Simplified Chinese: 华侨标准型(K)小学）, and Hua Qiao (S) Primary School (Simplified Chinese: 华侨标准型(S)小学）. (H)（K） The two schools share the campus at Jalan Kumpong Perak, and (S) primary school operate in campus at Kampung Baru. At that time, there were nearly 1,000 students in the three primary schools.

=== 1962 ===
The secondary school received all government subsidies and was renamed as Hua Qiao National Secondary School (Simplified Chinese: 华侨国民型华文中学).

=== 1963 ===
In order to cultivate the people's loyalty to the country, the government ordered the schools with Hua Qiao Chinese schools to change their names. The board of directors decided to change the name of the primary and secondary school from "华侨" to Keat Hwa "吉华". It split into Keat Hwa Secondary School (Simplified Chinese: 华侨国民型华文中学), Keat Hwa Independent High School (Simplified Chinese: 吉华独立中学), Keat Hwa (H) Primary School (Simplified Chinese: 吉华国民型 (H) 华文小学), Keat Hwa (K) Primary School (Simplified Chinese: 吉华国民型 (K) 华文小学) and Keat Hwa (S) Primary School (Simplified Chinese: 吉华国民型(S) 华文小学).

=== 1964 ===
The board set 31 July as the school anniversary date.

=== 21st century ===
==== 2007 ====
In 2007, Keat Hwa(K) which shared the same school facilities with Keat Hwa (H), moved to its own new premise while Keat Hwa (H) remains in the same location.

==== 2011 ====
In 2011, Keat Hwa Secondary School was honoured the Cluster School award.

And in 2011 itself too, Keat Hwa Secondary School celebrated its 100th anniversary. The preparation of the celebration was featured in Astro's Ben Di Quan and MalaysiaKini The preparation includes a number of events being held from the beginning of the year till the three-day celebration.

One of the events is the making of a dedicated album which covers 10 songs written and composed by Keat Hwa alumni and students. One of the songs being covered in the album is by St. John of Keat Hwa – 'Only Us'. The making of the 'Only Us' was again featured in MalaysiaKini

On 28 July 2011, the Prime Minister of Malaysia, Najib Razak visited the school for the celebration of Keat Hwa 100 Years. Najib Razak, during his speech, urged vernacular schools not to be ungrateful as their existence was due to the support given to them by the current ruling parties and coalition – Barisan Nasional.

The three-day celebration of 100 years establishment saw more than 35,000 exstudents/alumni and parents participating in the event.

=== 2016 ===
Keat Hwa Secondary School has more than 2500+ students, making it one of the best Chinese Secondary Schools in Malaysia with high passing rates and high number of students who scored excellent results in general examinations. This success is largely attributed to its merit-based selection of students from primary vernacular education. Entry requirement for acceptance into Keat Hwa Secondary School is relatively high compared to other schools. Keat Hwa Secondary School had won the Sudler Shield Award for their performance at the 2016 World Championship of Marching Show Band held in August 2016.

== Governance ==
=== Chinese Education (Mother-tongue Education) ===
As Keat Hwa Secondary School is a Chinese secondary school, Chinese language is a compulsory subject for all students with Chinese primary school background. Unlike other schools, student do not need to stay back after schooling time to attend Chinese language classes as the Chinese language lessons are arranged in the standard timetable. The mother tongue education in Keat Hwa Secondary School is one of the most successful ones in Malaysia.

== School structure ==
=== School Anthem ===
As Keat Hwa Secondary School is a Chinese school, and over 90% of the students are Chinese Malaysians, the school anthem is, unlike other schools in Malaysia, in Mandarin Chinese. The school anthem is also used in five (5) other Keat Hwa Chinese Schools namely the Keat Hwa II Secondary School, Keat Hwa Chinese Independent High School, Keat Hwa (H) Primary School, Keat Hwa (K) Primary School and Keat Hwa (S) Primary School.

== Extracurricular activities ==
=== School Magazine ===
Each year, the school publishes its very own school magazine. The school magazine published annually is informally called the 吉華校刊. It has always been the tradition that the cover of the school magazine changes with the different theme every year.

A special edition magazine was published in July 2012 in celebration of the 100th anniversary. The magazine is 588-page thick with a thick cover. It was sold at the Popular Bookstores nationwide. The title for this magazine is '吉华人•吉华情•吉华心'.

=== Keat Hwa Centennial Celebrations ===
Keat Hwa celebrated its 100th anniversary in 2011. A centenary celebration committee was set up prior to the celebration by the Keat Hwa Alumni Organization. The committee is fully in-charge of the celebrations with the co-operation from the school authorities. A series of events were organised throughout the year, culminating with a 3-day celebration, to mark this auspicious year for Keat Hwa, from 28 to 31 July 2011.

The 3-day gala event was held at the Keat Hwa Secondary School compound. Besides exhibition booths, there were several other events organised. Among the events are the Grand Festival, Grand Dinner and the Grand Expo. Other events include the celebration of Mooncake Festival by all the six Keat Hwa schools, singing competition, torch relay, Chinese cultural activities and the celebration of Chinese education in Malaysia.

The 3-day event successfully attracted more than 35,000 students and alumni from all over the world. The centenary celebration marked a milestone of Keat Hwa and showcased the success of the Chinese community in fighting for their own Chinese education, mother-tongue language and culture. Besides, the celebration was able to collect donations to set up an education fund for the usage of Keat Hwa schools in the coming years.

==== Grand Festival ====
Grand Festival was one of the biggest events of the celebrations. The Opening Ceremony with the participants of more than 1000 students, consisting different clubs and societies, uniformed units, boards of directors from 6 schools and also the alumni of Keat Hwa. Before the opening ceremony, a parade was held where all the teams marched from the oldest school building, Keat Hwa (S) to Keat Hwa Secondary School. The parade was the only major procession held in the city of Alor Setar in the last few decades to celebrate the anniversary of a school. The journey was roughly 5 kilometres and it caught the attention of the citizens of Alor Setar. Some even joined the parade which ended at the Keat Hwa Secondary School. The whole journey was held successfully with the help of the Malaysian police and the paramilitary civil volunteer corps controlling the traffic in the city.

A torch tower was designed and built for the opening ceremony with more than a million can tabs weighing more than 1100 kg. The preparation of the torch tower involved the participation of all students, teachers and alumni of Keat Hwa Secondary School. The achievement was recorded into the Malaysia Book of Records.

==== Grand Expo ====
Grand Expo was another huge event in the 3-day celebration. Besides booths, there were performances such as Chinese Orchestra, Wushu, cheer leadings, street dances, concerts and night markets, which added colour to the spirited celebration.

==== Grand Dinner ====
Grand Dinner was the final event of the 3-day celebration. The dinner was held on the final day of the celebration at the Dewan Wawasan, Jitra. The dinner was attended by more than 2500 Keat Hwa alumni from all over the world.

One of the peak event during the dinner was the performance which included more than 100 students from 6 Keat Hwa schools. The performance was to showcase the 100 years of Keat Hwa through drama and dance.

== Notable alumni ==
- Angelica Lee
- Daniel Lee Chee Hun
- Jesseca Liu
- Jocelyn Yow
- Chong Keat Aun (Chinese: 張吉安) Best New Director in 57th Golden Horse Award(Taiwan)
- Lee Zii Jia (Malaysian Badminton Player)

== See also ==
- Keat Hwa II Secondary School
- Keat Hwa High School
