= Sin Min Secondary School =

School in Sungai Petani, Kedah, Malaysia

SMJK Sin Min
- 新民国民型华文中学

Location
- Kuala Muda Yan; Sungai Petani, Kedah, 08000; Malaysia; 5.6527°N 100.4857°E

Information
- School type: National-type Chinese secondary school
- Founded: 1957
- Status: Open
- School code: KEB3051
- Principal: Mr. Ong Teik Ming
- Language: Bahasa Melayu, English and Mandarin

Sin Min Secondary School
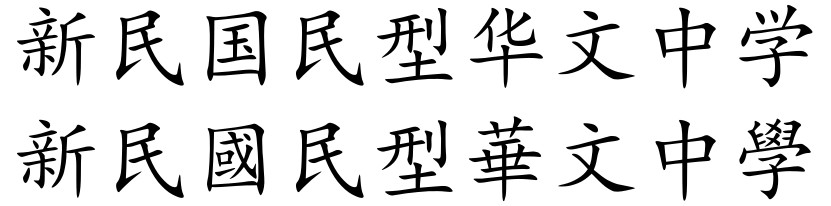
- Sin Min Secondary School in Simplified Chinese (top) and Traditional Chinese character (below)
- Traditional Chinese: 新民國民型華文中學
- Simplified Chinese: 新民国民型华文中学
Transcriptions
Standard Mandarin
- Hanyu Pinyin: Xīnmín Guómínxíng Huáwén Zhōngxué

SMJK Sin Min (新民国民型华文中学) (Sekolah Menengah Jenis Kebangsaan Sin Min) is a National-type Chinese secondary school which is located in Sungai Petani, Kedah, Malaysia. The school won the Anugerah Sekolah Harapan Negara in the "Secondary Schools (City)" category of the whole Malaysia in 2006 and the Anugerah Sekolah Cemerlang in 2007. In 2009 the school was awarded the status of Sekolah Kluster Kecemerlangan (Cluster School Of Excellence). The school is focusing on both Co-curriculum and curriculum.

== Official website ==
- SMJK Sin Min Web Portal (Chinese)
- SMJK Sin Min Official Website

== Sources ==
- DoctorJob.com.my - Happenings
- iSchool >> Customer Success Stories - SMJK Schools
