= Keat Hwa High School =

High school in Kota Setar, Kedah, Malaysia

Coordinates: 6.104493°N 100.355052°E

吉华独立华文中学 Jíhuá Dúlì Huáwén Zhōngxué
- Sekolah Menengah (Persendirian) Keat Hwa; Kaet Hwa (Private) High School

Location
- 500, Jalan Teratai off Jalan Pegawai; Alor Setar, Kedah, Alor Setar; Malaysia

Information
- Type: Private (Independent)
- Motto: 礼义廉耻 (Honesty and Honour)
- Founder: A group of local Chinese
- School district: Kota Setar
- School Type: Chinese Independent High School
- Gender: Co-educational
- Campus: Alor Setar
- Colours: Red, Blue, White, Yellow
- Medium of Language: English, Chinese, Malay
- Website: www.keathwa.edu.my

Keat Hwa High School
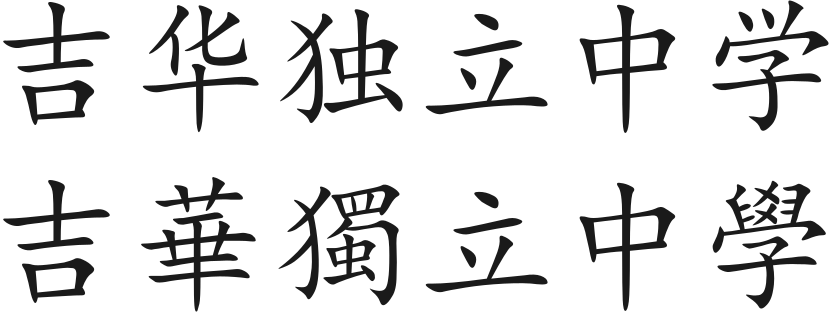
- Keat Kwa High School in Simplified Chinese (top) and Traditional Chinese (below) character

Chinese name
- Traditional Chinese: 吉華獨立中學
- Simplified Chinese: 吉华独立中学
- Literal meaning: Keat Hwa Independent Secondary School
Transcriptions
Standard Mandarin
- Hanyu Pinyin: Jíhuá Dúzhōng
Southern Min
- Hokkien POJ: Keât Huá tiong ouk

Malay name
- Malay: Sekolah Menengah Keat Hwa Persendirian

Keat Hwa High School (simplified Chinese: 吉华独立华文中学; traditional Chinese: 吉華獨立華文中學; pinyin: jí huá du li huá wén zhōng xué; Pe̍h-ōe-jī: Kiat-huâ to̍k-li̍p huâ-bûn tiong-o̍h) is a private Chinese high school in Alor Setar, Kedah, Malaysia. It is one of 60 Chinese independent high schools in Malaysia.

Keat Hwa High School is part of the Keat Hwa Family which consists of Keat Hwa Secondary School and Keat Hwa II Secondary School and three other primary schools.

Keat Hwa High School is a private Chinese high school and should not be confused with the other two conforming Chinese high schools, Keat Hwa Secondary School and Keat Hwa II Secondary School.

== See also ==
- Keat Hwa Secondary School
- Keat Hwa II Secondary School
