= Keat Hwa II Secondary School =

Secondary school in Kota Setar, Kedah, Malaysia

- Chinese: 吉华国民型华文中学二校; Malay: Sekolah Menengah Jenis Kebangsaan Keat Hwa II
- 6°6′14.30″N 100°20′12.048″E

Information
- School type: National-type Chinese secondary school
- Established: 2004
- Affiliation: Keat Hwa I Secondary School

Keat Hwa II Secondary School
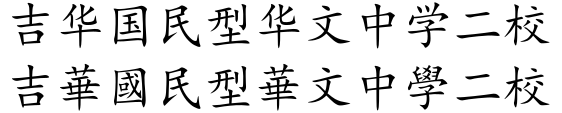
- Keat Hwa II Secondary School in Simplified Chinese (top) and Traditional Chinese character (below)
- Traditional Chinese: 吉華國民型華文中學二校
- Simplified Chinese: 吉华国民型华文中学二校
Transcriptions
Standard Mandarin
- Hanyu Pinyin: Jíhuá Guómínxíng Huáwén Zhōngxué Èr Xiào

Keat Hwa II Secondary School was founded in 2004 after Keat Hwa I Secondary School, which was founded in 1970. Before 1970, it was located at Kampung Baru, Alor Star, Kedah, Malaysia and shared facilities with another branch of the Keat Hwa schools, a primary school named Keat Hwa (S). After five decades, the school got approval to build its own facilities, which are located at Taman Sri Abadi, off Kuala Kedah Road, 06600 Alor Star, Kedah. Since moving to its new location, enrolment in the school has doubled.

The new school ground has six science labs, one block dedicated to the living skills subject, and a library. Since 2003, science and mathematics have been taught in English. Before that, the subjects were taught in Malay, the native language of Malaysia.

== See also ==
- Keat Hwa Secondary School
- Keat Hwa High School
