= Malaysian University English Test =

English language proficiency test

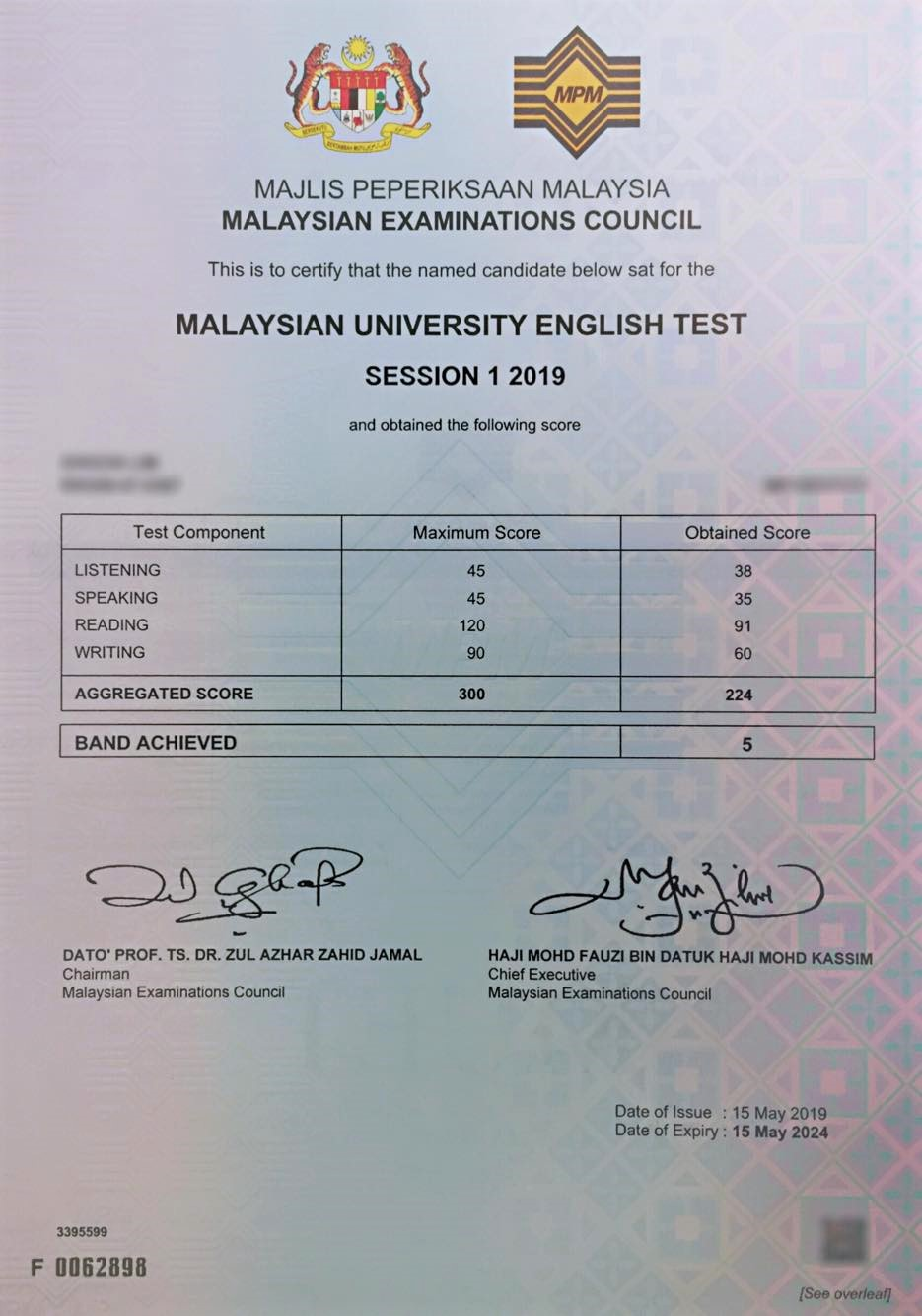
- Sample of MUET Certificate
- Acronym: MUET
- Type: Standardised test (either paper based or computer based).
- Administrator: Malaysian Examinations Council
- Skills tested: Listening, reading, writing, and speaking of the English language.
- Purpose: Prerequisite for admissions into all public universities and colleges in Malaysia
- Year started: 1999; 27 years ago
- Duration: Listening: 30 minutes, Speaking: 30 minutes, Reading: 90 minutes, Writing: 90 minutes. Total: 240 minutes (4 hours); Prior year 2021
- Score range: 1 to 6, in 1 band increments. 1 to 5+, in 0.5 or 1 band increments.
- Score validity: Prior year 2009, the validity period is until 18 July 2013. From year 2009, the validity period is five years from the date of issue of results.
- Offered: Up to 3 times a year. Up to 12 times a year (MUET On Demand).
- Regions: Malaysia
- Languages: English
- Annual number of test takers: 85,000
- Prerequisites: No official prerequisite.
- Fee: RM 150.00
- Website: http://webmpm1.mpm.edu.my/muet/

Malaysian University English Test (MUET) is a test of English language proficiency, largely used for university admissions in Malaysia. The test is set and run by the Malaysian Examinations Council and was established in 1999. MUET is largely recognised in Malaysia, Singapore and Hong Kong, with limited recognition in other countries such as United Kingdom.

MUET is a prerequisite for admissions into all public universities and colleges in Malaysia. Besides that, public servants also take MUET as an English qualification and for promotion opportunities.

From 2012 onwards, MUET is administered three times a year, in March, July and November. Candidate can choose whether to take the test at the beginning, middle or end of the year. Registration for the mid-year test opens in mid-January and closes in early February, while registration for the end-of-year test opens in early May and closes in early July. Refer to the MUET schedule for closing dates.

Besides that, an alternative test, MUET on Demand (computer based test), is also held in nearly every month for candidates who are urgent to get the MUET results. On average, 85,000 candidates sit for the MUET each time.

Candidates for this test must register at their respective schools/institutions. For private candidates and other candidates, they can register at any State Education Department (JPN) office. Registration forms can be obtained at JPN at a price of RM2.00 a set. The test fee is RM100.00 where previously it was RM50.00. There is also a book containing the test rules and scheme, syllabus and sample questions published and can be purchased by candidates.

From 2021, MUET has undergone a major change in format.

== MUET Test Structure ==
=== The four components of the MUET test ===
There are four components in MUET are as follows:

- Listening
- Speaking
- Reading
- Writing

The duration and weighting of each component are as follows:

Duration and weighting starting from MUET 2021
Paper Code	Component	Duration	Weighting
800/1	Listening	50 minutes	25%
800/2	Speaking	30 minutes	25%
800/3	Reading	75 minutes	25%
800/4	Writing	75 minutes	25%
	Total	230 minutes (3 hours 50 minutes)	100%

Duration and weighting prior to MUET 2020
Paper Code	Component	Duration	Weighting
800/1	Listening	30 minutes	15%
800/2	Speaking	30 minutes	15%
800/3	Reading	90 minutes	40%
800/4	Writing	90 minutes	30%
	Total	240 minutes (4 hours)	100%

== Scoring & Band Scale ==
Starting from MUET 2021, the maximum scores for each component are 90, makes an aggregated score of 360. The scores are graded in nine bands, including half bands, with Band 5+ being the highest while Band 1.0 the lowest.

Description of aggregated scores starting from MUET 2021
Aggregated score	Band	CEFR	User	The CEFR Global Scale: Common Reference Levels
331 - 360	5+	C1+	Proficient	Can understand a wide range of demanding, longer texts, and recognise implicit meaning. Can express him/herself fluently and spontaneously without much obvious searching for expressions. Can use language flexibly and effectively for social, academic and professional purposes. Can produce clear, well-structured, detailed text on complex subjects, showing controlled use of organisational patterns, connectors and cohesive devices.
294 - 330	5.0	C1	Proficient	Can understand a wide range of demanding, longer texts, and recognise implicit meaning. Can express him/herself fluently and spontaneously without much obvious searching for expressions. Can use language flexibly and effectively for social, academic and professional purposes. Can produce clear, well-structured, detailed text on complex subjects, showing controlled use of organisational patterns, connectors and cohesive devices.
258 - 293	4.5	B2	Independent	Can understand the main ideas of complex text on both concrete and abstract topics, including technical discussions in his/her field of specialisation. Can interact with a degree of fluency and spontaneity that makes regular interaction with native speakers quite possible without strain for either party. Can produce clear, detailed text on a wide range of subjects and explain a viewpoint on a topical issue giving the advantages and disadvantages of various options.
211 - 257	4.0	B2	Independent	Can understand the main ideas of complex text on both concrete and abstract topics, including technical discussions in his/her field of specialisation. Can interact with a degree of fluency and spontaneity that makes regular interaction with native speakers quite possible without strain for either party. Can produce clear, detailed text on a wide range of subjects and explain a viewpoint on a topical issue giving the advantages and disadvantages of various options.
164 - 210	3.5	B1	Independent	Can understand the main points of clear standard input on familiar matters regularly encountered in work, school, leisure, etc. Can deal with most situations likely to arise whilst travelling in an area where the language is spoken. Can produce simple connected text on topics which are familiar, or of personal interest. Can describe experiences and events, dreams, hopes and ambitions and briefly give reasons and explanations for opinions and plans.
123 - 163	3.0	B1	Independent	Can understand the main points of clear standard input on familiar matters regularly encountered in work, school, leisure, etc. Can deal with most situations likely to arise whilst travelling in an area where the language is spoken. Can produce simple connected text on topics which are familiar, or of personal interest. Can describe experiences and events, dreams, hopes and ambitions and briefly give reasons and explanations for opinions and plans.
82 - 122	2.5	A2	Basic	Can understand sentences and frequently used expressions related to areas of most immediate relevance (e.g. very basic personal and family information, shopping, local geography, employment). Can communicate in simple and routine tasks requiring a simple and direct exchange of information on familiar and routine matters. Can describe in simple terms aspects of his/her background, immediate environment and matters in areas of immediate need.
36 - 81	2.0	A2	Basic	Can understand sentences and frequently used expressions related to areas of most immediate relevance (e.g. very basic personal and family information, shopping, local geography, employment). Can communicate in simple and routine tasks requiring a simple and direct exchange of information on familiar and routine matters. Can describe in simple terms aspects of his/her background, immediate environment and matters in areas of immediate need.
1 - 35	1.0	A2	Basic	Can understand sentences and frequently used expressions related to areas of most immediate relevance (e.g. very basic personal and family information, shopping, local geography, employment). Can communicate in simple and routine tasks requiring a simple and direct exchange of information on familiar and routine matters. Can describe in simple terms aspects of his/her background, immediate environment and matters in areas of immediate need.

Prior to MUET 2020, the maximum scores for each component is 45 for Listening and Speaking, 120 for Reading Comprehension and 90 for Writing, with an aggregated score of 300. The scores are then graded in six bands, with Band 6 being the highest while Band 1 the lowest.

Description of aggregated scores prior to MUET 2020
Aggregated score	Band	CEFR	User	Communicative ability	Comprehension	Task performance
260 - 300	6	C2	Highly proficient user	Very fluent; highly appropriate use of language; hardly any grammatical error	Very good understanding of language and context	Very high ability to function in the language
220 - 259	5	C1	Proficient user	Fluent; appropriate use of language; few grammatical errors	Good understanding of language and context	High ability to function in the language
180 - 219	4	B2	Satisfactory user	Generally fluent; generally appropriate use of language; some grammatical errors	Satisfactory understanding of language and context	Satisfactory ability to function in the language
140 - 179	3	B2	Modest user	Fairly fluent; fairly appropriate use of language; many grammatical errors	Fair understanding of language and context	Fair ability to function in the language
100 - 139	2	B1	Limited user	Not fluent; inappropriate use of language; very frequent grammatical errors	Limited understanding of language and context	Limited ability to function in the language
Below 100	1	A2	Very limited user	Hardly able to use the language	Very limited understanding of language and context	Very limited ability to function in the language

=== MUET and CEFR, IELTS & TOEFL ===
Mapping of MUET Results against CEFR, IELTS, and TOEFL (Malaysian Examination Syndicate, 2018)
MUET		CEFR	IELTS	TOEFL	English Level
Aggregated score	Band	Band	Band	Band	English Level
260 - 300	6	C2	>8.0	110-120	Advanced
220 - 259	5	C1	7.0-8.0	94-109	Advanced
180 - 219	4	B2	6.0-6.5	60-93	Upper Intermediate
140 - 179	3	B2	5.5	46-59	Upper Intermediate
100 - 139	2	B1	4.0-5.0	31-45	Lower Intermediate
Below 100	1	A2	<4.0	<30	Elementary

== Results ==
School/institution candidates can collect their MUET test result slip from their respective schools/institutions, while individual private candidates from the State Education Department (JPN).

MUET results are presented in a results slip that shows:

- The test taker's name, index number (candidate number) and national identity number.
- Obtained score for each components of the test (Listening, Speaking, Reading and Writing)
- Obtained aggregated score of all the components of the test.
- Band Achieved (from Band 1 to Band 6 or Band 1 to Band 5+)

The validity period for MUET results are as follows:

- Prior year 2009, the validity period is until 18 July 2013.
- From year 2009, the validity period is five years from the date of issue of results.

== Locations and test dates ==
The MUET test centres are largely in public secondary schools that offer Form Six, matriculation colleges, certain universities, as well as certain private and semi-private colleges.

Listening, Reading and Writing components are usually tested on the same day, normally the second or the fourth Saturday of the month. The Speaking component is held on separate day, usually before the written test.

== University Entry English Requirement ==
STPM, Matriculation or Diploma students applying for admission to pursue a first degree at a local higher education institution must show evidence that they have taken the MUET test.

QS Ranking 2024	University	MUET	Band 3	Band 4	Band 5	Band 6
65	University Malaya(UM)	Equals to IELTS	4.5	6.0	-	-
137	Universiti Sains Malaysia(USM)	Equals to IELTS	4.0	-	-	-
158	University of Putra Malaysia(UPM)	Equals to IELTS	-	6.0	-	-
159	National University of Malaysia(UKM)	Equals to IELTS	4.0-4.5	5.0-6.0; 6.5(MUET 4.5)	7.0-7.5; 8.0(MUET 5.5)	8.5-9.0
188	University of Technology Malaysia(UTM)	Equals to IELTS	-	5.5	-	-
300	UCSI University(UCSI)	Equals to IELTS	5.0; 5.0(MUET 3.5)	6.0	-	-
555	Universiti Teknologi MARA(UiTM)	Equals to IELTS	5.0	6.0	-	-
621-630	Asia Pacific University(APU)	Equals to IELTS	4.0-4.5; 5.0(MUET 3.5)	5.5-6.0; 6.5(MUET 4.5)	-	-
781-790	Universiti Malaysia Pahang Al-Sultan Abdullah (UMPSA)	Equals to IELTS	5.0-5.5	6.0	-	-
801-850	Universiti Tunku Abdul Rahman(UTAR)	Equals to IELTS	5.5	6.0	-	-
1001-1200	Universiti Malaysia Sarawak(UniMAS)	Equals to IELTS	4.0-4.5; 5.0(MUET 3.5)	5.5-6.0; 6.5(MUET 4.5)	-	-

== See also ==
- STPM (Sijil Tinggi Persekolahan Malaysia)
- CEFR (Common European Framework of Reference for Languages)
- IELTS (International English Language Testing System)
- TOEFL (Test of English as a Foreign Language)
- SAT (Scholastic Assessment Test)
