= Malaysian Higher School Certificate =

Educational qualification in Malaysia

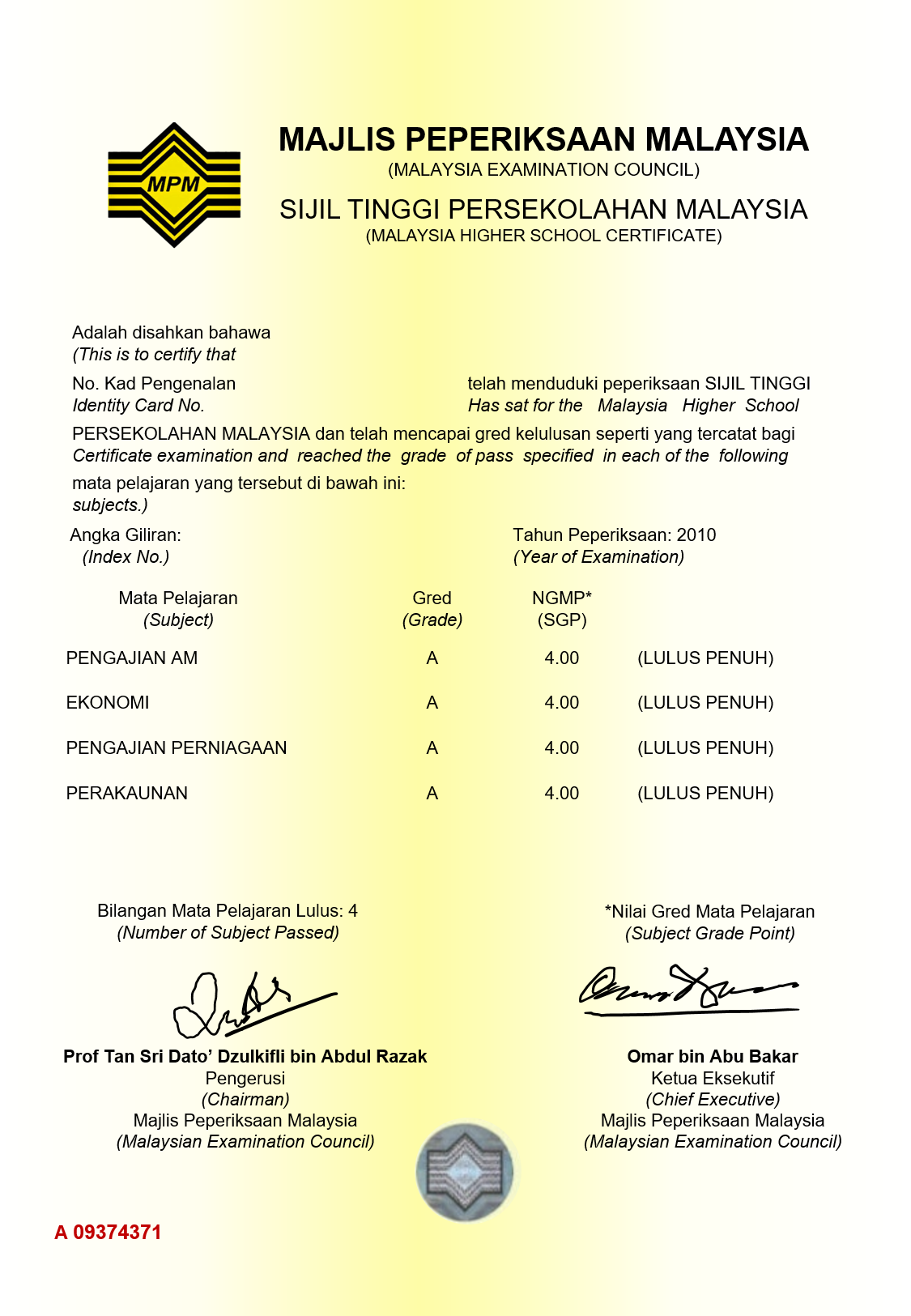
- Acronym: STPM
- Type: Prerequisite to a university degree application
- Administrator: Majlis Peperiksaan Malaysia
- Skills tested: Varies depending on subject, but in almost all STPM subjects, general knowledge, fundamental writing, and numerical skills are tested.
- Duration: 1 to 3 hours, depending on the subject. Person with disabilities are allowed for extra allocated time.
- Score range: Grades from A to F, with A being the highest. CGPA from 4.00 to 0.00, with 4.00 being the highest
- Score validity: Lifetime
- Restrictions on attempts: Subjects from the first and second semesters can be reattempted once. No resits for subjects for the third semester. However, upon release of full results, patching is allowed only for the same academic year of the university admission.
- Regions: Malaysia
- Languages: Main instruction languages: Bahasa Malaysia, English; Linguistic electives: Chinese, Tamil, Arabic
- Prerequisites: Sijil Pelajaran Malaysia
- Fee: Government Schools and Form Six Centres: Free; Patching and private entries: RM120 for basic fees, RM90 for each subject; Resits: RM50 for each subject
- Website: https://www.mpm.edu.my/

The Malaysian Higher School Certificate (Malay: Sijil Tinggi Persekolahan Malaysia), commonly abbreviated as STPM, is a pre-university examination in Malaysia. It was formerly known as the Higher School Certificate (HSC). Since 1982, STPM has been administered by the Malaysian Examinations Council (MEC), a statutory council under the Ministry of Education.

STPM is one of the major pre-university systems for admissions to Malaysian public universities, besides the Malaysian Matriculation Programme and the Malaysian Higher Islamic Religious Certificate (STAM). STPM is internationally recognised by many universities, and the results are considered as equivalent to GCE Advanced Level results.

From year 2012 onwards, the modular system has replaced the previous terminal system. The examination series is divided into three semesters and assessed thoroughly, instead of holding one major examination at the end of the examination series in the previous system. Besides that, examination results are monitored by a representative from Cambridge Assessment to maintain standards and quality.

== Form Six ==
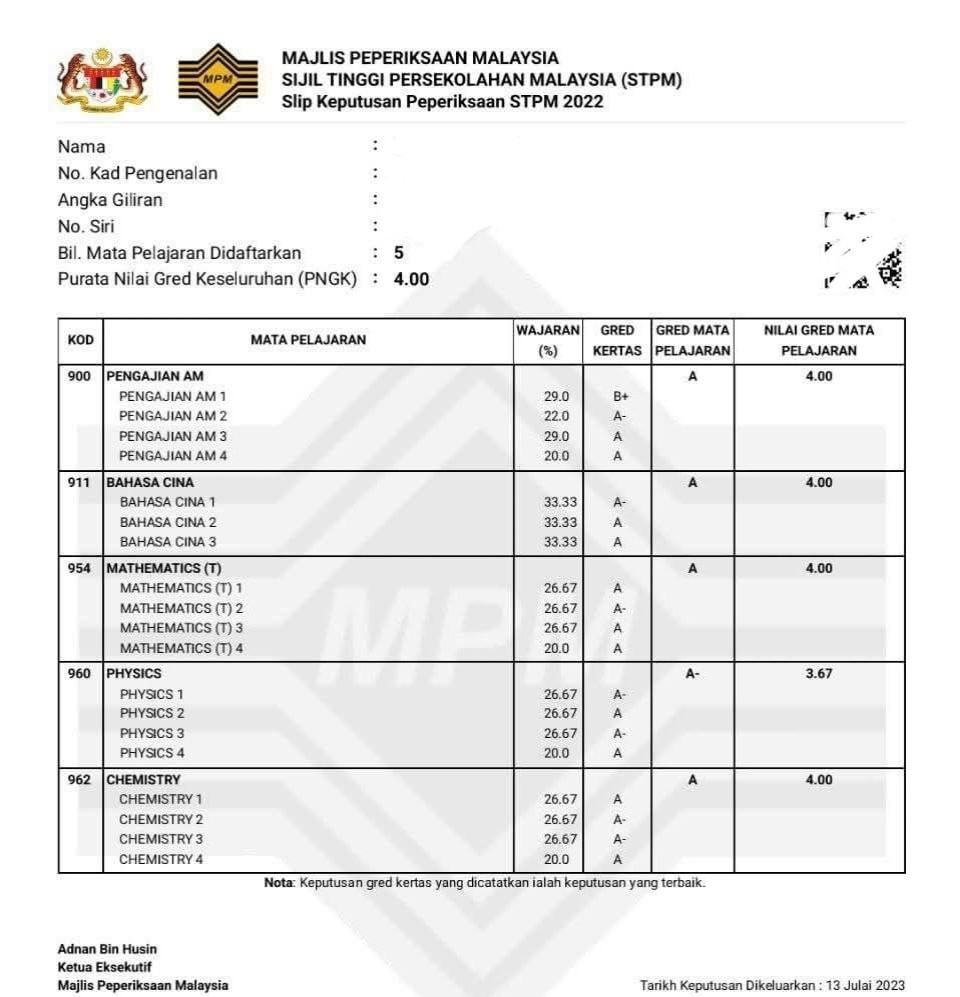
STPM examination results slip

As the national education in Malaysia is modelled after the educational system in England, the pre-university programme is the sixth form of secondary education, referred to as "Form Six". The Ministry of Education selects secondary schools it considers capable of providing Form Six classes. STPM examinations are held throughout Form Six.

Students in Form Six are called sixth formers. Sixth formers in national secondary schools are usually distinct from other students in the lower forms, such as wearing different school uniforms, usually given higher positions within societies of the school, often with lax enforcement of certain school rules and regulations, sometimes even holding a separate morning assembly and recess for sixth formers, also separate co-curriculum activities.

Sixth formers in most schools generally form their own association, officially called the Pre-University Student Representatives Council, Form Six Association or the Form Six Society. The main annual activity of these councils is the initiation of new sixth formers during the orientation.

Starting from 2025 onwards, selected public universities which are Universiti Kebangsaan Malaysia and Universiti Sains Malaysia also offer Form Six under the University Campus Form Six Programme, and plans for expansion are underway.

== Examination system ==
STPM is an open-list examination, that means any combination of subjects may be taken. However, most schools and colleges stream their students into science and humanities streams. To be qualified for Malaysian public university admissions, candidates must take General Studies (Pengajian Am) and at least three other subjects.

Most STPM candidates sit for four or five subjects. Majority candidates sit for four subjects, while some candidates sit for five subjects. It is possible for private candidates to sit for less than four subjects, but the results are only recognised by local private and overseas universities.

All STEM-related subjects (Mathematics (M), Mathematics (T), ICT, Physics, Chemistry and Biology) are offered bilingually in English and Malay. All the other subjects, besides language subjects, are offered only in Malay.

School-based assessments (SBA) are implemented for most subjects (except Chinese Language, Literature in English and Tamil Language), making up the weighting of 20% to 40% of overall marks for each subject.

Candidates are allowed to resit for Semester 1 and Semester 2 examinations for individual subjects if they are unsatisfied with the results. The repeat examinations are usually held around Semester 3 examination.

== Subjects ==
Up to 2014, Further Mathematics was provided as a subject in STPM. However, it was removed since then.

In 2020, Quran Studies (Tahfiz Al-Quran) was introduced as a new subject.

In 2025, subject names were changed such in Social Sciences and Religions and Maths (M) was changed to Management Mathematics and Maths (T) was changed to Mathematics.

A list of subjects available in STPM are:

=== General Studies ===
Code	Subject (Official title)	Subject (English title)	Examination language
900	Pengajian Am	General Studies	Malay

=== Language and Literature ===
Code	Subject (Official title)	Subject (English title)	Examination language
910	Bahasa Melayu	Malay Language	Malay
911	Bahasa Cina (华文)	Chinese Language	Chinese (Simplified Chinese)
912	Bahasa Tamil (தமிழ் மொழி)	Tamil Language	Tamil
913	Bahasa Arab (اللغة العربية)	Arabic Language	Arabic
920	Literature in English	Literature in English	English
922	Kesusasteraan Melayu Komunikatif ^{[a]}	Communicative Malay Literature	Malay

^{a} Formerly known as "Kesusasteraan Melayu (Malay Literature)".

=== Social Sciences and Religion ===
Code	Subject (Official title)	Subject (English title)	Examination language
930	Pengajian Syariah Kontemporari ^{[b]}	Contemporary Islamic Law Studies	Malay
931	Pengajian Usuluddin ^{[c]}	Islamic Studies	Malay
932	Tahfiz Al-Quran ^{[a]}	Quran Studies	Malay
940	Sejarah	History	Malay
942	Geografi	Geography	Malay
944	Ekonomi	Economics	Malay
946	Pengajian Perniagaan	Business Studies	Malay
948	Perakaunan	Accounting	Malay

^{a} Introduced in 2020.
^{b} Formerly known as "Syariah (Islamic Law)".
^{c} Formerly known as "Usuluddin (Islamic Studies)".

=== Science and Mathematics ===
Code	Subject (Official title)	Examination language
950	Management Mathematics^{a} ^{c} ^{e}	English or Malay
954	Mathematics ^{b} ^{d} ^{f}	English or Malay
958	Information And Communications Technology ^{[c]}	English or Malay
960	Physics	English or Malay
962	Chemistry	English or Malay
964	Biology	English or Malay

^{a} Only provide for Arts Stream Student
^{b} Only provide for Science Stream Student
^{c} Formerly known as "Computing".
^{d} Focus on management mathematics
^{e} Focus on pure mathematics
^{f} Formerly known as "Mathematics (M)".
^{g} Formerly known as "Mathematics (T)".

=== Arts and health ===
Code	Subject (Official title)	Subject (English title)	Examination language
966	Sains Sukan	Sports Science	Malay
970	Seni Visual	Visual Arts	Malay

== Grading system ==
STPM grading system uses cumulative grade point average (CGPA) system. There are 11 grades in STPM, which are A, A-, B+, B, B-, C+, C, C-, D+, D and F, with F as the failing grade. GPA ranging between 4.00 and 0.00 is assigned to the grades, with A being 4.00, B being 3.00, C being 2.00, D being 1.00, and F being 0.00.

Grade C and above is considered principal pass, while grade between C− and D is considered partial pass. Grade F is considered fail.

Paper grade	Subject grade	Subject grade point (SGP)	Status
A	A	4.00	Principal Pass
A-	A-	3.67	Principal Pass
B+	B+	3.33	Principal Pass
B	B	3.00	Principal Pass
B-	B-	2.67	Principal Pass
C+	C+	2.33	Principal Pass
C	C	2.00	Principal Pass
C-	C-	1.67	Partial Pass
D+	D+	1.33	Partial Pass
D	D	1.00	Partial Pass
F	F	0.00	Fail

After the term or repeat exam, the paper grades for the term or repeated term will be released shortly afterwards. The grades for school-based assessments, if available, are released with Semester 3 results.

Overall results are released shortly after the release of Repeat 1, Repeat 2 and Semester 3 results. In the overall results, each subject is graded based on the weighted average marks of all papers in the subject. If a candidate has repeated a paper, then the higher mark between the original and the repeat paper will be taken.

The CGPA for the overall results is calculated by taking the average of GPA of four best performed subjects, including General Studies.

Admissions to Malaysian public universities require CGPA of at least 2.00 and above, with principal passes in three subjects including General Studies. On the other hand, local private universities accept students with only two principal passes without considering the requirement of CGPA.

== See also ==
- Education in Malaysia
- Sijil Pelajaran Malaysia (SPM)
- Malaysian University English Test
- Advanced Level (UK)
