= List of schools in Selangor =

This is a list of schools in Selangor, Malaysia. It is categorised according to the variants of schools in Malaysia and is arranged alphabetically.

== Private schools ==
=== Chinese independent high schools ===
- Chung Hua Independent High School
- Hin Hua High School
- Pin Hwa High School
- Kwang Hua Private High School

=== International/other private schools ===
- Alice Smith School, Kuala Lumpur
- At-Tamimi International School Subang Jaya
- Australian International School Malaysia (AISM)
- Axcel International School, Batu 14
- Beaconhouse Sri Lethia, Klang
- Beaconhouse Sri Murni, Cheras
- Chinese Taipei School Kuala Lumpur
- Dwi Emas International School
- Eagles Grammar International School, USJ 12
- ELC International School (EIS)
- Fairview International School, Subang Jaya Campus (FISSJ)
- HELP International School
- IGB International School (IGBIS)
- Japanese School of Kuala Lumpur
- Kingsley International School
- Nobel International School, Selangor
- Oxburgh International School
- Regent International School, Klang
- Regent International School, Puchong
- Rocklin International School, Kuala Lumpur
- Sapura Smart School, Subang
- Sekolah Sri Acmar, Bandar Baru Klang
- Sekolah Sri Bestari, Bandar Sri Damansara
- Sri Bestari International School, Bandar Sri Damansara (SBIS)
- Sekolah Sri KDU®, Kota Damansara
- Sekolah Sri Sempurna
- Sri Emas International School
- Sri KDU® International School, Kota Damansara
- Sri Kuala Lumpur School, Subang Jaya
- Sri Sempurna International School
- Sri UCSI Secondary School, Subang Jaya
- STARS International School, Petaling Jaya
- Sunway International School (SIS)
- Taylor's International School, Kuala Lumpur (TISKL)
- Taylor's International School, Puchong (TISP)
- The International School at Parkcity
- UCSI International School, Subang Jaya
- Victoria International School (VIS), Banting
- Wesley Methodist School, Klang
- Wesley Methodist School Kuala Lumpur (International)

== Primary schools ==
=== National primary schools ===
School Code	School name	Postcode	Area
BBA0001	SK Klang	41000	Klang
BBA0002	SK Telok Gadong	41250	Klang
BBA0003	SK Pelabuhan Kelang	42000	Pelabuhan Klang
BBA0004	SK Telok Menegon	41000	Klang
BBA0005	SK Bukit Naga	40460	Shah Alam
BBA0006	SK Jalan Kebun	42450	Klang
BBA0007	SK Batu Belah	42100	Klang
BBA0008	SK Rantau Panjang	42100	Klang
BBA0009	SK Sementa	42100	Klang
BBA0010	SK Kapar	42200	Kapar
BBA0011	SK Bukit Kapar	42200	Kapar
BBA0012	SK Sungai Binjai	41050	Klang
BBA0013	SK Pulau Indah	42920	Pelabuhan Klang
BBA0014	SK Tok Muda	42200	Kapar
BBA0015	SK Bukit Kuda	41300	Klang
BBA0016	SK Kampung Raja Uda	42000	Pelabuhan Klang
BBA0017	SK Pandamaran Jaya	42000	Pelabuhan Klang
BBA0018	SK Kampung Johan Setia	41200	Klang
BBA0019	SK Sungai Serdang	42200	Kapar
BBA0020	SK (Asli) Bukit Kemandol	42610	Jenjarom
BBA0021	SK Kampung Pendamar	41200	Klang
BBA0022	SK Telok Gong	42000	Pelabuhan Klang
BBA0023	SK Taman Klang Jaya	41200	Klang
BBA0024	SK Taman Sri Muda	40400	Shah Alam
BBA0025	SK Telok Pulai	41100	Klang
BBA0026	SK Sungai Udang	41250	Klang
BBA0028	SK Pelabuhan Utara	42000	Pelabuhan Klang
BBA0029	SK Abdul Samat	42200	Kapar
BBA0030	SK Meru	42200	Kapar
BBA0031	SK Kampung Idaman	42000	Pelabuhan Klang
BBA0032	SK Taman Klang Utama	42100	Klang
BBA0033	SK Kampung Jawa	41000	Klang
BBA0034	SK Taman Sri Andalas	41200	Klang
BBA0035	SK Taman Gembira	41100	Klang
BBA0036	SK Bukit Tinggi	41200	Klang
BBA0037	SK Bukit Kemuning 2	40460	Shah Alam
BBA0038	SK Meru (2)	41050	Klang
BBA0039	SK Sungai Kapar Indah	42200	Kapar
BBA0040	SK Bukit Kemuning	40460	Shah Alam
BBA0041	SK Kampung Jawa 2	41000	Klang
BBA0042	SK Pulau Indah (2)	42900	Pelabuhan Klang
BBA0043	SK Bukit Rimau	40460	Shah Alam

=== Chinese vernacular primary schools ===
- Sekolah Jenis Kebangsaan (C) Connaught 2
- Sekolah Jenis Kebangsaan (C) Chap Khuan, Batu Arang
- Sekolah Jenis Kebangsaan (C) Chee Wen
- Sekolah Jenis Kebangsaan (C) Chen Moh, Petaling Jaya
- Sekolah Jenis Kebangsaan (C) Chong Hua, Klang
- Sekolah Jenis Kebangsaan (C) Choong Hua, Banting
- Sekolah Jenis Kebangsaan (C) Chuen Min
- Sekolah Jenis Kebangsaan (C) Damansara
- Sekolah Jenis Kebangsaan (C) Desa Jaya 1
- Sekolah Jenis Kebangsaan (C) Desa Jaya 2
- Sekolah Jenis Kebangsaan (C) Han Ming
- Sekolah Jenis Kebangsaan (C) Hin Hua
- Sekolah Jenis Kebangsaan (C) Ijok
- Sekolah Jenis Kebangsaan (C) Jalan Davidson
- Sekolah Jenis Kebangsaan (C) Jenjarom
- Sekolah Jenis Kebangsaan (C) Kah Wah, Banting
- Sekolah Jenis Kebangsaan (C) Kampung Baru Semenyih
- Sekolah Jenis Kebangsaan (C) Kepong 1
- Sekolah Jenis Kebangsaan (C) Kepong 2
- Sekolah Jenis Kebangsaan (C) Kepong 3
- Sekolah Jenis Kebangsaan (C) Khe Beng
- Sekolah Jenis Kebangsaan (C) Kian Sit
- Sekolah Jenis Kebangsaan (C) Kong Hoe, Klang
- Sekolah Jenis Kebangsaan (C) Kota Emerald
- Sekolah Jenis Kebangsaan (C) Kundang
- Sekolah Jenis Kebangsaan (C) Ladang Harcroft
- Sekolah Jenis Kebangsaan (C) Lick Hung
- Sekolah Jenis Kebangsaan (C) Lick Hung, SS19
- Sekolah Jenis Kebangsaan (C) Pandamaran A
- Sekolah Jenis Kebangsaan (C) Pandamaran B
- Sekolah Jenis Kebangsaan (C) Pin Hwa 1
- Sekolah Jenis Kebangsaan (C) Pin Hwa 2
- Sekolah Jenis Kebangsaan (C) Puay Chai
- Sekolah Jenis Kebangsaan (C) Pui Ying
- Sekolah Jenis Kebangsaan (C) San Yuk
- Sekolah Jenis Kebangsaan (C) Serdang Baru 1
- Sekolah Jenis Kebangsaan (C) Serdang Baru 2
- Sekolah Jenis Kebangsaan (C) Sin Ming, Semenyih
- Sekolah Jenis Kebangsaan (C) Subang
- Sekolah Jenis Kebangsaan (C) Sungai Buloh
- Sekolah Jenis Kebangsaan (C) Sungai Way
- Sekolah Jenis Kebangsaan (C) Taman Rashna
- Sekolah Jenis Kebangsaan (C) Tiong Nam, Sungai Buaya
- Sekolah Jenis Kebangsaan (C) Tun Tan Cheng Lock
- Sekolah Jenis Kebangsaan (C) Tun Tan Siew Sin, Putra Heights
- Sekolah Jenis Kebangsaan (C) Wu Teck
- Sekolah Jenis Kebangsaan (C) Yak Chee
- Sekolah Jenis Kebangsaan (C) Yoke Kuan
- Sekolah Jenis Kebangsaan (C) Yu Hua
- Sekolah Jenis Kebangsaan (C) Yuk Chai
- Sekolah Jenis Kebangsaan (C) Yuk Chih, Bestari Jaya
- Sekolah Jenis Kebangsaan (C) Yuk Chyun, Petaling Jaya

== Secondary schools ==
=== Secondary education: Sekolah Menengah Kebangsaan (SMK) ===
School Code	School name	Postcode	Area	Coordinates
BEB8652	SMK (L) Bukit Bintang	46200	Petaling Jaya	3.1085°N 101.6410°E
BEB0106	SMK (P) Bukit Kuda	41300	Klang	3.0447°N 101.4575°E
BEA0101	SMK (P) Kapar	42200	Kapar	3.1356°N 101.3811°E
BEB0105	SMK (P) Methodist	41000	Klang	3.0451°N 101.4409°E
BEB0109	SMK (P) Raja Zarina	42000	Pelabuhan Klang	3.0110°N 101.4096°E
BEB8655	SMK (P) Sri Aman	46100	Petaling Jaya	3.1022°N 101.6283°E
BEB8658	SMK (P) Tmn Petaling	46000	Petaling Jaya	3.0888°N 101.6584°E
BEA4606	SMK Abdul Jalil	43100	Hulu Langat	3.1181°N 101.8175°E
BEA8622	SMK Alam Megah	40400	Shah Alam	3.0124°N 101.5688°E
BEA8653	SMK Alam Megah 2	40400	Shah Alam	3.0049°N 101.5647°E
BEA5068	SMK Ampang Pecah	44000	Kuala Kubu Bharu	3.5418°N 101.6632°E
BEB8651	SMK Assunta	46000	Petaling Jaya	3.1001°N 101.6501°E
BEA6044	SMK Bagan Terap	45300	Sungai Besar	3.7481°N 101.0586°E
BEA1073	SMK Bandar Banting	42700	Banting	2.8031°N 101.5026°E
BEA4622	SMK Bandar Baru Ampang	68000	Ampang	3.1369°N 101.7683°E
BEA4603	SMK Bandar Baru Bangi	43650	Bandar Baru Bangi	2.9466°N 101.7697°E
BEA5069	SMK Bandar Baru Batang Kali	44300	Batang Kali	3.4580°N 101.6535°E
BEA9604	SMK Bandar Baru Salak Tinggi	43900	Sepang	2.8276°N 101.7200°E
BEA0109	SMK Bandar Baru Sultan Suleiman	42000	Pelabuhan Klang	3.0290°N 101.3815°E
BEA8620	SMK Bandar Baru Sungai Buloh	47000	Sungai Buloh	3.2068°N 101.5616°E
BEA4623	SMK Bandar Baru Sungai Long	43000	Kajang	3.0528°N 101.8018°E
BEA4629	SMK Bandar Damai Perdana	56000	Kuala Lumpur	3.0436°N 101.7367°E
BEA8656	SMK Bandar Puchong Jaya (A)	47100	Puchong	3.0638°N 101.6230°E
BEA8657	SMK Bandar Puchong Jaya (B)	47170	Puchong	3.0435°N 101.6262°E
BEA8670	SMK Bandar Puncak Jalil	43300	Seri Kembangan	3.0271°N 101.6784°E
BEA4632	SMK Bandar Rinching	43500	Semenyih	2.9305°N 101.8653°E
BEA1075	SMK Bandar Saujana Putra	42610	Jenjarom	2.9563725°N 101.5829664°E
BEA3089	SMK Bandar Saujana Utama (2)	47000	Sungai Buloh	3.2093°N 101.4862°E
BEA4633	SMK Bandar Seri Putra	43000	Kajang	2.8877°N 101.7833°E
BEA8659	SMK Bandar Sri Damansara 1	52200	Kuala Lumpur	3.1851°N 101.6042°E
BEA8641	SMK Bandar Sri Damansara 2	52200	Kuala Lumpur	3.1914°N 101.6039°E
BEA5070	SMK Bandar Sungai Buaya	48010	Rawang	3.3733°N 101.5303°E
BEA8626	SMK Bandar Sunway	46150	Petaling Jaya	3.0703°N 101.6174°E
BEA4628	SMK Bandar Tasik Kesuma	43700	Beranang	2.8991°N 101.8701°E
BEA7618	SMK Bandar Tasik Puteri	48000	Rawang	3.2872°N 101.4736°E
BEA4630	SMK Bandar Tun Hussein Onn 2	43200	Cheras	3.0547°N 101.7554°E
BEA8658	SMK Bandar Utama Damansara (2)	47800	Petaling Jaya	3.1393°N 101.6109°E
BEA8644	SMK Bandar Utama Damansara (4)	47800	Petaling Jaya	3.1543°N 101.6112°E
BEA8643	SMK Bandar Utama Damansara 3	47800	Petaling Jaya	3.1401°N 101.6066°E
BEA1071	SMK Banting	42700	Banting	2.8207°N 101.5287°E
BEA1068	SMK Batu Laut	42800	Tanjong Sepat	2.6780°N 101.5152°E
BEA0112	SMK Batu Unjur	41200	Klang	3.0116°N 101.4339°E
BEA1070	SMK Bukit Changgang	42700	Banting	2.8229°N 101.6223°E
BEA8605	SMK Bukit Gading	47000	Sungai Buloh	3.2142°N 101.5297°E
BEA4619	SMK Bukit Indah	68000	Ampang	3.1554°N 101.7768°E
BEA8650	SMK Bukit Jelutong	40150	Shah Alam	3.1090°N 101.5315°E
BEA0114	SMK Bukit Kapar	42200	Kapar	3.1628°N 101.4098°E
BEA3087	SMK Bukit Kuching Tengah	45800	Jeram	3.2636°N 101.3333°E
BEA7619	SMK Bukit Rahman Putra	47000	Sungai Buloh	3.2301°N 101.5554°E
BEA5066	SMK Bukit Sentosa	48300	Rawang	3.4023°N 101.5678°E
BEA5073	SMK Bukit Sentosa 2	48300	Rawang	3.4158°N 101.5866°E
BEA0113	SMK Bukit Tinggi Klang	41200	Klang	3.0098°N 101.4287°E
BEA4620	SMK Cheras Jaya	43200	Cheras	3.0197°N 101.7618°E
BEA4617	SMK Cheras Perdana	43200	Cheras	3.0453°N 101.7656°E
BEB0101	SMK Convent	41000	Klang	3.0384°N 101.4448°E
BEB4068	SMK Convent	43000	Kajang	2.9896°N 101.7902°E
BEA9609	SMK Cyberjaya	63000	Cyberjaya	2.9193°N 101.6395°E
BEA8652	SMK Damansara Damai 1	47830	Petaling Jaya	3.1915°N 101.5923°E
BEA8608	SMK Damansara Jaya	47400	Petaling Jaya	3.1312°N 101.6161°E
BEA8611	SMK Damansara Utama	47400	Petaling Jaya	3.1363°N 101.6255°E
BEA7615	SMK Darul Ehsan	68100	Batu Caves	3.2525°N 101.6684°E
BEB0108	SMK Dato Hamzah	42000	Pelabuhan Klang	3.0079°N 101.4076°E
BEA3075	SMK Dato Harun	45500	Tanjong Karang	3.4256°N 101.1709°E
BEA6601	SMK Dato Mustaffa	45400	Sekinchan	3.5666°N 101.0720°E
BEA9612	SMK Dato' Abu Bakar Baginda	43650	Bandar Baru Bangi	2.9511°N 101.7501°E
BEA4618	SMK Dato' Ahmad Razali	68000	Ampang	3.1570°N 101.7593°E
BEB5066	SMK Dato' Hj Kamaruddin	44000	Kuala Kubu Bharu	3.5668°N 101.6585°E
BEB9701	SMK Dengkil	43800	Dengkil	2.8658°N 101.6726°E
BEA4634	SMK Desa Serdang	43300	Seri Kembangan	3.0104°N 101.7277°E
BEA4627	SMK Dusun Nanding	43100	Hulu Langat	3.0822°N 101.7905°E
BEA4608	SMK Engku Husain	43500	Semenyih	2.9537°N 101.8397°E
BEA5065	SMK Gedangsa	44020	Kuala Kubu Bharu	3.7331°N 101.3839°E
BEA7601	SMK Gombak Setia	53100	Gombak	3.2204°N 101.7151°E
BEA7608	SMK Hillcrest	68100	Batu Caves	3.2437°N 101.7075°E
BEB7652	SMK Hulu Kelang	68000	Ampang	3.1634°N 101.7477°E
BEA7609	SMK Ideal Heights	68100	Batu Caves	3.2488°N 101.6417°E
BEB4071	SMK Jalan Bukit	43000	Kajang	2.9859°N 101.7921°E
BEA4624	SMK Jalan Empat	43650	Bandar Baru Bangi	2.9609°N 101.7820°E
BEA0105	SMK Jalan Kebun	40460	Shah Alam	2.9813°N 101.5079°E
BEA4613	SMK Jalan Reko	43000	Kajang	2.9647°N 101.7895°E
BEA4614	SMK Jalan Tiga	43650	Bandar Baru Bangi	2.9442°N 101.7799°E
BEA1064	SMK Jenjarom	42600	Jenjarom	2.8817°N 101.5069°E
BEA3078	SMK Jeram	45800	Jeram	3.2265°N 101.3699°E
BEA1065	SMK Jugra	42700	Banting	2.8202°N 101.4571°E
BEA4625	SMK Kajang Utama	43000	Kajang	2.9732°N 101.7952°E
BEA5064	SMK Kalumpang	44100	Kerling	3.6345°N 101.5702°E
BEA5062	SMK Kampong Soeharto	44010	Kuala Kubu Bharu	3.6849°N 101.3902°E
BEA0106	SMK Kampung Jawa	41000	Klang	3.0259°N 101.4647°E
BEA8615	SMK Kelana Jaya	47301	Petaling Jaya	3.1078°N 101.5971°E
BEB7651	SMK Kepong	52100	Kuala Lumpur	3.2256°N 101.6354°E
BEA4605	SMK Khir Johari	43700	Beranang	2.8675°N 101.8711°E
BEA0108	SMK Kota Kemuning	40460	Shah Alam	2.9961°N 101.5475°E
BEA5061	SMK Kuala Kubu Bharu	44000	Kuala Kubu Bharu	3.5692°N 101.6636°E
BEA3086	SMK Kuala Selangor	45000	Kuala Selangor	3.3328°N 101.2704°E
BEB0104	SMK La Salle	41200	Klang	3.0319°N 101.4379°E
BEB8654	SMK La Salle PJ	46000	Petaling Jaya	3.1005°N 101.6536°E
BEA7603	SMK Lembah Keramat	54200	Kuala Lumpur	3.1981°N 101.7597°E
BEA8661	SMK Lembah Subang	47301	Petaling Jaya	3.1147°N 101.5802°E
BEB1069	SMK Methodist	42700	Banting	2.8213°N 101.5189°E
BEB0099	SMK Methodist (ACS)	41000	Klang	3.0427°N 101.4405°E
BEA6042	SMK Munshi Abdullah	45100	Sungai Air Tawar	3.8133°N 100.8978°E
BEA4616	SMK Pandan Indah	55100	Ampang	3.1228°N 101.7522°E
BEA4615	SMK Pandan Jaya	55100	Ampang	3.1366°N 101.7379°E
BEA4631	SMK Pandan Mewah	55100	Kuala Lumpur	3.1250°N 101.7619°E
BEA9610	SMK Pantai Sepang Putra	43950	Sungai Pelek	2.6216°N 101.7128°E
BEA0102	SMK Pendamaran Jaya	42000	Pelabuhan Klang	3.0062°N 101.4212°E
BEA3082	SMK Pengkalan Permatang	45000	Kuala Selangor	3.3623°N 101.2436°E
BEA4611	SMK Perimbun	43200	Cheras	3.0612°N 101.7703°E
BEA8601	SMK Puchong	47100	Puchong	3.0005°N 101.6215°E
BEA8628	SMK Puchong Perdana	47150	Petaling	3.0051°N 101.6002°E
BEA8663	SMK Puchong Permai	47150	Puchong	2.9950°N 101.5958°E
BEA8636	SMK Puchong Utama (1)	47100	Puchong	2.9840°N 101.6106°E
BEB1074	SMK Pulau Carey	42960	Pulau Carey	2.8916°N 101.3527°E
BEA0097	SMK Pulau Indah	42920	Pulau Indah	2.9441°N 101.3538°E
BEB0111	SMK Pulau Ketam	42940	Pelabuhan Klang	3.0226°N 101.2537°E
BEA3085	SMK Puncak Alam	42300	Bandar Puncak Alam	3.2107°N 101.4290°E
BEA3088	SMK Puncak Alam 3	42300	Puncak Alam	3.2472°N 101.4248°E
BEA8649	SMK Pusat Bandar Puchong 1	47160	Puchong	3.0284°N 101.6226°E
BEA9611	SMK Putra Perdana	47130	Puchong	2.9440°N 101.6221°E
BEA0092	SMK Raja Lumu	42000	Pelabuhan Klang	3.0149°N 101.4157°E
BEA0091	SMK Raja Mahadi	41200	Klang	3.0107°N 101.4480°E
BEA3077	SMK Raja Muda Musa	45600	Bestari Jaya	3.3742°N 101.4089°E
BEA0100	SMK Rantau Panjang	42100	Klang	3.0694°N 101.4103°E
BEA3081	SMK Rantau Panjang	45600	Bestari Jaya	3.3890°N 101.4392°E
BEA7605	SMK Rawang	48000	Rawang	3.3076°N 101.5978°E
BEA4621	SMK Saujana Impian	43000	Kajang	3.0133°N 101.7886°E
BEA3084	SMK Saujana Utama	47000	Sungai Buloh	3.2085°N 101.4779°E
BEA8618	SMK Seafield	47600	UEP Subang Jaya	3.0610°N 101.5852°E
BEA8639	SMK Seksyen 1 Bandar Kinrara	47180	Puchong	3.0508°N 101.6426°E
BEA8638	SMK Seksyen 10 Kota Damansara	47810	Petaling Jaya	3.1694°N 101.5794°E
BEA8610	SMK Seksyen 16	40200	Shah Alam	3.0549°N 101.5034°E
BEA8617	SMK Seksyen 18	40200	Shah Alam	3.0521°N 101.5234°E
BEA8621	SMK Seksyen 19	40300	Shah Alam	3.0512°N 101.5331°E
BEA8654	SMK Seksyen 24 (2)	40300	Shah Alam	3.0371°N 101.5174°E
BEA8660	SMK Seksyen 27	40400	Shah Alam	3.0216°N 101.5661°E
BEA8645	SMK Seksyen 3 Bandar Kinrara	47180	Puchong	3.0385°N 101.6418°E
BEA8647	SMK Seksyen 4 Bandar Kinrara	47180	Puchong	3.0455°N 101.6469°E
BEA8655	SMK Seksyen 4 Kota Damansara	47810	Petaling Jaya	3.1517°N 101.5817°E
BEA8648	SMK Seksyen 7	40000	Shah Alam	3.0826°N 101.4948°E
BEA8666	SMK Seksyen 8 Kota Damansara	47810	Petaling Jaya	3.1779°N 101.5792°E
BEA8629	SMK Seksyen 9	40100	Shah Alam	3.0880°N 101.5217°E
BEA8616	SMK Seksyen Sebelas	40000	Shah Alam	3.0731°N 101.5292°E
BEB7653	SMK Selayang Bharu	68100	Batu Caves	3.2519°N 101.6672°E
BEA5072	SMK Serendah	48200	Serendah	3.3674°N 101.6151°E
BEB6046	SMK Seri Bedena	45300	Sungai Besar	3.6786°N 100.9835°E
BEB3080	SMK Seri Desa	45500	Tanjong Karang	3.4210°N 101.1645°E
BEB7654	SMK Seri Garing	48000	Rawang	3.3167°N 101.5680°E
BEA7607	SMK Seri Gombak	68100	Batu Caves	3.2317°N 101.7017°E
BEA8627	SMK Seri Indah	43300	Seri Kembangan	3.0123°N 101.7162°E
BEB8659	SMK Seri Kembangan	43300	Seri Kembangan	3.0279°N 101.6977°E
BEA7614	SMK Seri Keramat	54200	Kuala Lumpur	3.1966°N 101.7599°E
BEA7620	SMK Seri Kundang	48020	Rawang	3.2556°N 101.5208°E
BEA7612	SMK Seri Selayang	68100	Batu Caves	3.2423°N 101.6728°E
BEA9602	SMK Seri Sepang	43900	Sepang	2.8104°N 101.7407°E
BEA8606	SMK Seri Serdang	43300	Seri Kembangan	3.0069°N 101.7142°E
BEA3074	SMK Seri Tanjung	45000	Kuala Selangor	3.3458°N 101.2425°E
BEA8665	SMK Setia Alam	40170	Shah Alam	3.0943°N 101.4580°E
BEA3079	SMK Sg. Burong	45500	Tanjong Karang	3.4556°N 101.1323°E
BEA8668	SMK Shah Alam	40150	Shah Alam	3.1117°N 101.5401°E
BEA0111	SMK Shahbandaraya	41000	Klang	3.0241°N 101.4646°E
BEA7622	SMK Sierramas	47000	Sungai Buloh	3.2141°N 101.5804°E
BEA1072	SMK Sijangkang Jaya	42500	Telok Panglima Garang	2.9320°N 101.4761°E
BEA0104	SMK Sri Andalas	41200	Klang	3.0192°N 101.4517°E
BEA8602	SMK Sri Permata	47300	Petaling Jaya	3.1024°N 101.6135°E
BEA8624	SMK Sri Utama	46100	Petaling Jaya	3.0984°N 101.6310°E
BEA8625	SMK SS 17	47500	Subang Jaya	3.0769°N 101.5827°E
BEA8630	SMK Subang	40150	Shah Alam	3.1519°N 101.5283°E
BEA8662	SMK Subang Bestari	40150	Shah Alam	3.1781°N 101.5437°E
BEA8604	SMK Subang Jaya	47500	Subang Jaya	3.0692°N 101.5903°E
BEA8614	SMK Subang Utama	47500	Subang Jaya	3.0686°N 101.5819°E
BEA4604	SMK Sultan Abdul Aziz Shah	43000	Kajang	3.0056°N 101.7829°E
BEA0096	SMK Sultan Abdul Samad	41300	Klang	3.0456°N 101.4590°E
BEB8657	SMK Sultan Abdul Samad	46200	Petaling Jaya	3.1169°N 101.6440°E
BEA8603	SMK Sultan Salahuddin Abdul Aziz Shah	40000	Shah Alam	3.0722°N 101.5094°E
BEB3079	SMK Sultan Sulaiman Shah	45600	Bestari Jaya	3.3757°N 101.4068°E
BEA6043	SMK Sungai Besar	45300	Sungai Besar	3.6778°N 100.9923°E
BEA5063	SMK Sungai Choh	48000	Rawang	3.3503°N 101.5859°E
BEA0110	SMK Sungai Kapar Indah	42200	Kapar	3.0984°N 101.3758°E
BEA7613	SMK Sungai Kertas	68100	Batu Caves	3.2572°N 101.6869°E
BEB1073	SMK Sungai Manggis	42700	Banting	2.8262°N 101.5369°E
BEB9651	SMK Sungai Pelek	43950	Sg.Pelek	2.6404°N 101.7115°E
BEA7616	SMK Sungai Pusu	53100	Kuala Lumpur	3.2383°N 101.7178°E
BEA4635	SMK Sungai Ramal	43000	Kajang	2.9837°N 101.7610°E
BEA9601	SMK Sungai Rawang	43950	Sungai Pelek	2.6717°N 101.6769°E
BEB5065	SMK Syed Mashor	44300	Batang Kali	3.4651°N 101.6475°E
BEA5071	SMK Taman Bunga Raya (1)	48300	Rawang	3.4392°N 101.5526°E
BEA8607	SMK Taman Dato' Harun	46000	Petaling Jaya	3.0778°N 101.6349°E
BEA7617	SMK Taman Desa	48000	Rawang	3.3308°N 101.5247°E
BEA7621	SMK Taman Desa 2	48000	Rawang	3.3311°N 101.5375°E
BEA8664	SMK Taman Desaminium	43300	Seri Kembangan	3.0063°N 101.6605°E
BEA7604	SMK Taman Ehsan	52100	Kuala Lumpur	3.2224°N 101.6235°E
BEA4626	SMK Taman Jasmin 2	43000	Kajang	2.9809°N 101.8137°E
BEA7606	SMK Taman Keramat	54200	Kuala Lumpur	3.1706°N 101.7433°E
BEA0107	SMK Taman Klang Utama	42100	Klang	3.0829°N 101.4217°E
BEA4609	SMK Taman Kosas	68000	Ampang	3.1482°N 101.7722°E
BEA8613	SMK Taman Medan	46000	Petaling Jaya	3.0761°N 101.6358°E
BEA7610	SMK Taman Melawati	53100	Kuala Lumpur	3.2153°N 101.7509°E
BEB8656	SMK Taman SEA	46300	Petaling Jaya	3.1104°N 101.6166°E
BEA7602	SMK Taman Selayang	68100	Batu Caves	3.2434°N 101.6734°E
BEA4610	SMK Taman Seraya	56100	Ampang	3.1136°N 101.7611°E
BEA8623	SMK Taman Sri Muda	40400	Shah Alam	3.0258°N 101.5400°E
BEA4601	SMK Taman Tasik	68000	Ampang	3.1266°N 101.7744°E
BEB1072	SMK Tanjung Sepat	42800	Tanjong Sepat	2.6569°N 101.5665°E
BEA4612	SMK Tasek Permai	68000	Ampang	3.1240°N 101.7806°E
BEA1066	SMK Telok Datok	42700	Banting	2.8190°N 101.5243°E
BEA0103	SMK Telok Gadong	41100	Klang	3.0394°N 101.4286°E
BEA1069	SMK Telok Panglima Garang	42500	Telok Panglima Garang	2.9117°N 101.4690°E
BEA0094	SMK Tengku Ampuan Jemaah	42000	Pelabuhan Klang	3.0060°N 101.4069°E
BEA0093	SMK Tengku Ampuan Rahimah	41200	Klang	3.0328°N 101.4401°E
BEA0095	SMK Tengku Idris Shah	42200	Kapar	3.1357°N 101.3768°E
BEB4069	SMK Tinggi Kajang (Kajang High School)	43000	Kajang	2.9925°N 101.7950°E
BEB0102	SMK Tinggi Klang (Klang High School)	41710	Klang	3.0544°N 101.4493°E
BEA3080	SMK Tiram Jaya	45500	Tanjong Karang	3.4344°N 101.2365°E
BEA8640	SMK Tropicana	47410	Petaling Jaya	3.1286°N 101.5972°E
BEA8637	SMK TTDI Jaya	40150	Shah Alam	3.1047°N 101.5547°E
BEB7655	SMK Tuanku Abdul Rahman	48100	Rawang	3.3175°N 101.4727°E
BEA7623	SMK Tun Perak	48000	Rawang	3.3006°N 101.5852°E
BEA6041	SMK Ungku Aziz	45200	Sabak Bernam	3.7697°N 100.9888°E
BEA8635	SMK USJ 12	47630	UEP Subang Jaya	3.0442°N 101.5743°E
BEA8633	SMK USJ 13	47630	UEP Subang Jaya	3.0374°N 101.5807°E
BEA8642	SMK USJ 23	47640	Subang Jaya	3.0193°N 101.5802°E
BEA8632	SMK USJ 4	47600	Subang Jaya	3.0549°N 101.5757°E
BEA8634	SMK USJ 8	47610	UEP Subang Jaya	3.0452°N 101.5921°E

=== Secondary education: Sekolah Menengah Jenis Kebangsaan (SMJK) ===
School Code	School name	Name In Chinese	Postcode	Area	Coordinates
BEB8653	SMJK Katholik	公教国民型华文中学	46000	Petaling Jaya	3.1074°N 101.6518°E
BEB0100	SMJK Chung Hwa	中华国民型华文中学	40470	Shah Alam	3.0242°N 101.4873°E
BEB0103	SMJK Kwang Hua	光华国民型华文中学	41150	Klang	3.0645°N 101.4594°E
BEB6047	SMJK Yoke Kuan	育群国民型华文中学	45400	Sekinchan	3.5122°N 101.1034°E
BEB4070	SMJK Yu Hua	育华国民型华文中学	43000	Kajang	2.9960°N 101.7912°E

== Boarding schools and Islamic colleges ==
- Kolej Islam Sultan Alam Shah (KISAS), Klang
- Maktab Rendah Sains MARA, Kuala Kubu Bharu
- Sekolah Agama Menengah Bestari (SAMBEST), Subang Jaya
- Sekolah Agama Menengah Hulu Langat, Batu 10 Cheras (SAMTEN)
- Sekolah Agama Menengah Nurul Iman Kg Bukit Cherakah (SAMNI)
- Sekolah Agama Menengah Rawang (SAMER)
- Sekolah Agama Menengah Sultan Hisamuddin, Sungai Bertih, Klang
- Sekolah Agama Menengah Tinggi Sultan Hisamuddin, Klang (SAMTSH)
- Sekolah Agama Menengah Tinggi Tengku Ampuan Jemaah, Shah Alam (SAMTTAJ)
- Sekolah Agama Menengah Tinggi Tengku Ampuan Rahimah, Sungai Manggis, Banting (SAMTTAR)
- Sekolah Menengah Islam Hira', Jeram
- Sekolah Berasrama Penuh Integrasi Gombak (INTESABER)
- Sekolah Berasrama Penuh Integrasi Rawang (SEPINTAR)
- Sekolah Berasrama Penuh Integrasi Sabak Bernam (INTESABER), Sabak Bernam
- Sekolah Menengah Sains Banting (BASIS), Banting
- Sekolah Menengah Sains Hulu Selangor (SEMASHUR)
- Sekolah Menengah Sains Kuala Selangor (KUSESS)
