= Malaysian Super Schools Rugby =

Youth rugby tournament

- Malaysia Super Schools Rugby 15s
- Sport: Rugby
- Instituted: 2013
- Number of teams: 24 (School) / 12 (Academy)
- Country: Malaysia (Malaysian Super Schools Rugby Secretariat)
- Holders: Sekolah Menengah Sains Hulu Selangor (SSR) / Akademi Ragbi Selangor (SSRA) (2025)
- Most titles: Sekolah Menengah Sains Hulu Selangor (3 titles)
- Website: https://superschoolsrugby.com/

Malaysian Super Schools Rugby (SSR) is a youth rugby 15's tournament in Malaysia.

The tournament was first launched in 2013, with former participants going on to represent the national team in age-level competition and also the senior squad.

== Format ==
For the 9th Edition of Super Schools Rugby 2024, 5 new teams, Sekolah Menengah Sains Pokok Sena (SAINA), Sekolah Menengah Kebangsaan Abi, Sekolah Menengah Kebangsaan Sultan Yahya Petra 1, Sekolah Berasrama Penuh Integrasi Gombak, MRSM Balik Pulau have been invited to the tournament. For the 10th Edition of Super Schools Rugby 2025, five more new teams have been selected, bringing the total number of teams to 24 that will compete in this prestigious youth rugby tournament.

24 teams split into six pools of four teams, with top 2 teams from each pool qualify for the 2nd round while other 4 teams (the best 3rd place) will also join for the 2nd round.

Winners from 2nd round will progress into the quarter-finals then progress to semi finals - and winners from semi finals will compete in the Grand Finals for the right to lift the Tan Sri Wan Aziz Challenge Trophy.

Starting in 2024, the Academy category has been introduced featuring 7 state academies/sports schools. A year later, in 2025, 5 teams were added, bringing the total to 12 teams.

Since 2016, the cup is known as Malaysia Airports Chairman’s Challenge Trophy.

== Core Teams ==
Malaysian Super Schools Rugby
Team	Nickname	Location	Debut	Best Achievement
Sekolah Menengah Sains Selangor	SMSS Rugby	Kuala Lumpur	2013	Runners-up (2013, 2016)
Sekolah Dato' Abdul Razak	SDAR Lions	N.Sembilan	2013	Semi Final
Sekolah Tuanku Abdul Rahman	STAR Cobratasha	Perak	2013	Champions (2013, 2016)
Sekolah Sultan Alam Shah	SAS Rugby	Putrajaya	2013	Quarter final
Malay College Kuala Kangsar	MCKK All Blacks	Perak	2013	Champions (2014, 2018)
Sekolah Menengah Sains Hulu Selangor	SEMASHUR Zealord	Selangor	2013	Champions (2019, 2024, 2026)
English College Johore Bahru	EC Steenboks	Johor	2018	Runners-up (2024)
Victoria Institution	VI Blues	Kuala Lumpur	2017	Champions (2017, 2023)
Royal Military College (Malaysia)	RMC Black Scorpion	Kuala Lumpur	2018	Semi final
Sekolah Menengah Kebangsaan King Edward VII	KE VII Tigers	Perak	2015	Quarter final
Sekolah Menengah Sains Sultan Mahmud	SESMA Cougars	Terengganu	2019	Quarter final
Kolej Sultan Abdul Hamid	SAHC Rugby	Kedah	2015	Quarter final
Kolej Yayasan Saad	KYS Rammers	Melaka	2015	Quarter final
Bukit Mertajam High School	HSBM Scorpions	Penang	2019	Group stage
Sekolah Menengah Sains Tuanku Syed Putra	Syed Putra Daggers	Perlis	2026	Wildcard
Sekolah Menengah Sains Tuanku Jaafar	STJ Warriors	N.Sembilan	2025	Group stage
Sekolah Menengah Kebangsaan Abi (ACS)	ABI Warriors	Perlis	2024	Group stage
Sekolah Menengah Sains Pokok Sena	SAINA Rugby	Kedah	2025	Group stage
Maktab Rendah Sains MARA Alor Gajah	MRSMAG Jumbo	Melaka	2025	Group stage
Maktab Rendah Sains MARA Balik Pulau	MRSMBP Cougars	Pulau Pinang	2024	Champions (2025)
Sekolah Menengah Kebangsaan Sultan Yahya Petra 1	SYP Rugby	Kelantan	2025	Group stage
Sekolah Menengah Sains Sultan Mohamad Jiwa	SMADJIWA Eagles	Kedah	2025	Group stage
Sekolah Berasrama Penuh Integrasi Gombak	INTEGOMB Titan	Selangor	2025	Quarter final
Sekolah Menengah Sains Teluk Intan	SEMESTI Rugby	Perak	2025	Group stage
Sekolah Sains Sultan Haji Ahmad Shah	SHAH Phantom	Pahang	2025	Group stage

Malaysian Super Schools Rugby Academy
Team	Nickname	Location	Debut	Best Achievement
Sekolah Menengah Kebangsaan Tinggi Batu Pahat	HSBP Highlanders	Johor	2026	Quarter final
Sekolah Sukan Tunku Mahkota Ismail	SSTMI Tsunami	Johor	2024	Champions (2024)
Akademi Ragbi Terengganu	ART Rugby	Terengganu	2024	Group stage
Sekolah Menengah Kebangsaan Hosba	HOSBA Dragons	Kedah	2024	Quarter final
Akademi Ragbi Melaka	AKRAM Rugby	Melaka	2026	Wildcard play off
Akademi Ragbi Selangor	ARAS Rugby	Selangor	2024	Champions (2026)
Sekolah Sukan Malaysia Pahang	SSMP Falcons	Pahang	2024	Champions (2025)
Sekolah Menengah Kebangsaan King Edward VII	KE VII Tigers	Perak	2026	Runner up
Sekolah Menengah Kebangsaan Shah Alam	SA Antlers	Selangor	2025	Quarter final
COBRA Rugby Academy	COBRA Rugby	Selangor	2025	Quarter final
Maktab Sultan Ismail	SIC Rugby	Kelantan	2025	Group stage
KL Tigers Academy	KL Tigers Rugby	Kuala Lumpur	2025	Quarter final

Sekolah Menengah Kebangsaan King Edward VII schools were upgraded to the academy category in 2025.

== Malaysian Super Schools Rugby Grand Finals ==
Edition	CHAMPIONS	Score	Runner-Up	Venue
2013	STAR Cobratasha	19 - 15	SMSS	Padang PULAPOL, Kuala Lumpur.
2014	MCKK All Blacks	17 - 7	STAR Cobratasha	Stadium INSPEN, Kajang.
2016	STAR Cobratasha	19 - 5	SMSS	Stadium Sayyidina Hamzah, IIUM, Gombak
2017	VI Blues	10 - 8	MCKK All Blacks	Stadium Sayyidina Hamzah, IIUM, Gombak
2018	MCKK All Blacks	25 - 10	SEMASHUR Zealord	Proton Sport Complex, Tanjung Malim
2019	SEMASHUR Zealord	22 - 19	MCKK All Blacks	Proton Sport Complex, Tanjung Malim
2023	VI Blues	21 - 7	SEMASHUR Zealord	Padang A UPM, Serdang
2024	SEMASHUR Zealord	41 - 31	EC Steenboks	Stadium UITM, Shah Alam
2025	MRSMBP Cougars	14 - 13	VI Blues	Taman Ekuestrian, Putrajaya
2026	SEMASHUR Zealord	37 - 33	VI Blues	Stadium Merdeka, Kuala Lumpur

== Malaysian Super Schools Rugby Academy Grand Finals ==
Edition	CHAMPIONS	Score	Runner-Up	Venue
2024	SSTMI Tsunami	24 - 17	ARAS	UM Arena, Kuala Lumpur
2025	SSMP Falcons	12 - 10	SSTMI Tsunami	Taman Ekuestrian, Putrajaya
2026	ARAS	29 - 19	KE VII TIGERS	Stadium Merdeka, Kuala Lumpur

== See also ==
- Rugby League World Cup
- Women's Rugby World Cup
- Rugby World Cup Overall Record
