= Kepong =

- Neighbourhood of Kuala Lumpur
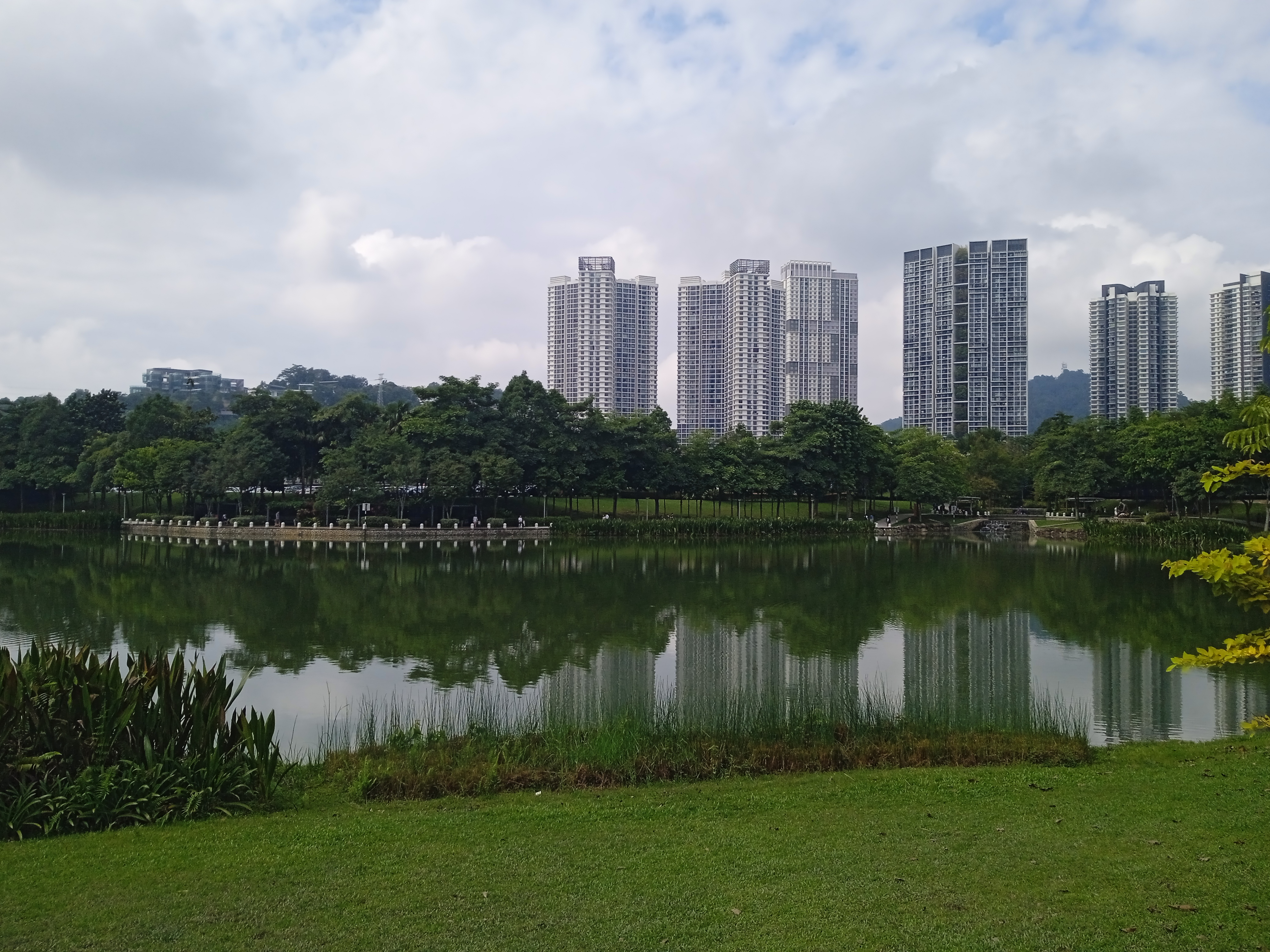
- Central Park, Desa ParkCity

- Location within Malaysia
- Coordinates: 3°12′51.2″N 101°38′20.1″E
- Country: Malaysia
- Federal Territory: Kuala Lumpur
- Constituency: Kepong

Government
  - City council: Kuala Lumpur City Hall
  - Mayor: Mahadi Che Ngah
- Time zone: UTC+8 (MST)
- Postcode: 52000-52200
- Dialling code: +603-62

Kepong is a town in northern Kuala Lumpur, Malaysia, bordering Selayang in the neighbouring state of Selangor. Ever since Kepong emerged as a Chinese tin-mining village, it has always had a mostly Chinese population, shown by a 72.9% majority in the wider federal constituency of Kepong in 2025.

== Toponymy ==
There are 2 theories for the name Kepong. The first suggests that it comes from the Malay word kepong (more commonly spelled kepung) meaning "enclose" or "surround", as the town is surrounded by a mountain range. The second suggests that it comes from the name of a Red Meranti tree (Rubroshorea) named Pokok Meranti Kepong in Malay (Rubroshorea ovalis).

The Chinese name of Kepong is 甲洞 (Mandarin: jiǎ dòng, Cantonese: gaap3 dung6), which comes from a Cantonese transliteration of "Kepong".

== Geography ==
Not to be confused with Bukit Kepong in Johor, Kepong is in the Northwest of Kuala Lumpur about 10 km from KLCC, therefore administered by the Kuala Lumpur City Hall. Most of it is in the federal constituency of Kepong, and in the Mukim of Batu. Although not in Kuala Lumpur nor in the federal constiuency of Kepong, Taman Ehsan and Taman Desa Jaya are often considered a part of Kepong.

It is neighboured by Bukit Lagong and Selayang on the North, Segambut on the South, Sentul on the East, Sungai Buloh on the West, and Batu Caves on the Northeast.

Kepong has many bodies of water, natural and man-made, including the river Sungai Keroh, and the lake in Kepong Metropolitan Park respectively.

== Notable parks and green spaces ==
View of the lake in Kepong Metropolitan Park

Parking lot of Kepong Metropolitan Park, seen from MRR2

=== Kepong Metropolitan Park ===
Kepong Metropolitan Park (Malay: Taman Tasik Metropolitan Kepong), 218.8 acres in total size, is one of the largest parks in Kuala Lumpur, situated next to Middle Ring Road 2. It is a popular recreational park notable for kite-flying, often visible from the highway. Initially a tin-mining area, it was reclaimed and converted into a park, which now surrounds a man-made lake around 57 hectares in size.

The park is well-maintained despite being free to enter, and is open from 5.30 am to 10 pm every day. It has around 3.5 km shared-use path for cycling, jogging, and walking, covered by many rainbow-coloured arches at the start. For those who are active, the park provides recreational exercise equipment, children's playgrounds, as well as open fields for football, kite-flying, and more. There are also bicycle rentals and stalls selling kites at the entrance. For others, there is 3 lookout towers, gazebos, benches, and food stalls. Amenities include a public toilet, prayer rooms, an uncovered cark park, and a covered 7-storey car park.

There is a boathouse and jetty where people rent boats then paddle across the lake. Though often unused, there is a international RC car track called KL International Radio Control Circuit. It is also connected to 2 commercial areas, Kiara Bay and Kepong'Gi square.

As it is situated next to MRR2, there are complaints of constant noise and air pollution.

=== Others ===
- Forest Research Institute Malaysia (FRIM Kepong)
- Central Park in Desa Park City
- Menjalara Lake Park (Taman Tasik Menjalara)

== History ==
=== Early History ===
Kepong was initially a small Malay settlement on the banks of Sungei Keroh. Away from the river, Yap Ah Loy pioneered the opening of Kepong as a tin mining district in the late 1870s and early 1880s. Neighbouring the Parit Tengah mines, it had a population of 721 miners in 1884, presumed to have lived in mining camps. As other Chinese towkays (business owners), including partners Chiew Yoke and Loke Yew, opened new mines, the economic growth prompted them to build Kepong road, a private road from Kuala Lumpur around 7 miles away to Kepong, and to establish a permanent business community.

Kepong, referred to by the Chinese as Kap-Thoong Kai-Chong, hence emerged as a market town in around 1886 along Kepong road at the 7th mile. It had over a hundred shophouses, in which shopkeepers lived and traded with miners, providing them their daily necessities. In Cantonese, Kai-Chong (街场) means a market town, and Kap-Thoong (甲洞) is the a transliteration of “Kepong”.

In August 1896, a fire destroyed 41 houses, including gambling, spirit, and opium farms. In 1900 and 1901, the town having been rebuilt by then, Fook Chung, the gambling farmer of Kepong, and the Captain China Yap Kwan Seng petitioned the Acting British Resident H. C. Belfield for police protection in the town.

These requests were to ensure the continued existence of Kepong as a new law classified its houses as ‘illegal’ since Kepong was neither gazetted as a town or village, nor placed under the jurisdiction of a sanitary board. British officials detested these spontaneously formed ‘purely Chinese villages’, citing their horrible sanitation as the main problem, at least officially. Instead of granting sanitary board status, Kepong was planned to be abandoned in favour of a new village near the newly built railway station. Shopkeepers petitioned against this, arguing that business relied on the proximity to the mines and people from Kuala Lumpur who travel by carriage and rickshaws, whereas the proposed village was not close to any mines nor did many people travel by train. Fortunately, Kepong was permitted to stay where it was, as a new road beside the railway station was too expensive.

In 1906, facing the potential forfeiture of the lease for the land in Kepong due to the imminent expiry of the mining lease, the leaseholder proposed levelling the road frontage and rebuilding the houses at her own expense, given that the government issued a grant to the land. The proposal was rejected, for the Resident planned for another new village about half a mile further up Kepong road, as it would be closer to the railway station without the need for a new road.

A last-ditch effort was made by submitting a petition, stating that Kap-Thoong Kai-Chong was a named, long-standing settlement of mostly shopkeepers and not ‘not men of capital’. It was also rejected, as the settlement was ‘unsuitable’ and ‘insanitary’. The new village was ready in 1908 and Kepong was subsequently gazetted a village on 0.03 square miles of ex-mining land, with the order to move issued in 1910, otherwise a $200 fine or imprisonment. In September, a petition was sent by an unrepresented community until this point – the poor garderners, pig rearers, and hawkers with families who lived a quarter mile away from the Kepong shophouses – begging to be allowed to stay. They were rejected too, but were informed alternative land would be found for them, and issued with a temporary occupation license.

In 1931, the census recorded 1,831 people, which was enough to surpass the 1,000 threshold to give Kepong ‘town’ status. Of them, 92% were Chinese, 6% Indian, and 2% Malay.

=== 1950s to 1980s ===
In the 1950’s, during the Malayan Emergency, Jinjang was a new village formed in Kepong, and many Chinese people from rural areas were forced to relocate here.

In the 1970s and 1980s, Kepong gradually urbanised, becoming home to large working and middle-class communities.

== Public transportation ==
There are two Keretapi Tanah Melayu (KTM) stations: Kepong station and the later built Kepong Sentral station (which is a connecting station to the MRT Putrajaya line). Both stations are located on the KTM Komuter Tanjung Malim–Port Klang Line. Kepong Sentral is also served by a limited number of KTM ETS services (KL Sentral to Ipoh railway station).

The Klang Valley Mass Rapid Transit (MRT) has seven stations serving Kepong on the Putrajaya line, which are the Sri Damansara Barat, Sri Damansara Sentral, Sri Damansara Timur (connecting station to Kepong Sentral KTM station), Metro Prima, Kepong Baru, Jinjang, and Sri Delima MRT stations. The stations opened in June 2022 as part of the line's Phase One operation.

RapidKL, SJ Bus and Selangor Omnibus provides bus transport in the area. From the 7 MRT stations, there are 10 Rapid Bus feeder bus routes.

Bus Route Number	Station	Frequency (mins)
T106	Sri Damansara Barat	10
T107	Sri Damansara Sentral	10
T108	Sri Damansara Sentral	10
T109	Sri Damansara Sentral	10
T110	Sri Damansara Timur	10
T114	Metro Prima	10
T115	Kepong Baru	10
T117	Jinjang	10
T121	Sri Delima	60
T152	Metro Prima	60

== Places of interest ==
=== Shopping malls ===
- AEON BiG Kepong
- AEON Mall Metro Prima (connected to Metro Prima MRT station, previously named Jaya Jusco)
- Lotus's Kepong (previously named Kepong Village Mall and Tesco Kepong)

=== Others ===
- Temasek Pewter Factory, Jalan Kuang Bulan, Taman Kepong
- Chinese Temples in Kepong
- Samnak Sambodhi Buddhist Temple
- Plaza Arkadia in Desa ParkCity
- Kepong'Gi square
- Bukit Sri Bintang
- Kepong Baru Wet Market

== Main areas ==
=== Desa ParkCity ===
Desa ParkCity is a 473-acre award-winning township, known for its luxurious houses and modern design. The area used to be a barren quarry mine and then was acquired by ParkCity in 1999. As of 2026, Desa ParkCity has 21 gated neighbourhoods. There are also plans for another condominium, ParkCity Residences, and an office tower, ParkCity Tower.

==== Residential Areas ====
- Condominiums: Noöra, One Central Park, Park Regent, Sofiya, South Brooks, The Breezeway, Northshore Gardens, Park Place, The Westside One, The Westside II, The Westside III
- Terraced Housing: Adiva, Adora, Amelia, Casaman, Davinia, Nadia, Safa, Southlake, The Mansions, The Ridgewood, Zenia

==== Facilities ====
- Sports centre with basketball courts and a football field
- Clubhouse with tennis courts, badminton courts, swimming pools, a hall, a studio, and a gym
- East, West, and Central Parks
- Commercial areas: The Waterfront and Plaza Arkadia
- Education: The International School @ ParkCity, SJK (C) Kepong 3, Kolej Tingkatan Enam Desa Mahkota, and many preschools in Plaza Arkadia
- ParkCity Medical Centre
- Kuala Lumpur Baptist Church

=== Other main areas ===
- Bandar Sri Damansara
- Jinjang
- Taman Kepong
- Bandar Menjalara
- Kepong Baru
- Metro Prima

== Cuisine ==
There are many kopitiams in Kepong. Kepong is also famous for its bak kut teh, with Hing Kee Bak Kut Teh being awarded the Michelin Bib Gourmand Award.

== Roads and expressways ==
The major roads leading into Kepong are Jalan Ipoh, and Jalan Kuching. In Kepong, the main road is Jalan Kepong (Malaysia Federal Route 54), with roads like Jalan Metro Prima, Jalan Burung Hantu, and Jalan Kepong Baru feeding into it.

Many expressways pass through Kepong, including the Kuala Lumpur Middle Ring Road 2 and the Damansara-Puchong Expressway (LDP). The Duta–Ulu Klang Expressway (DUKE) Phase 2, a 7.4 kilometres (4.6 mi) long elevated tolled highway that connects Bandar Sri Damansara and Segambut, has interchanges located at Menjalara and Segambut. Although Desa ParkCity is located next to the New Klang Valley Expressway (NKVE), there are no interchanges there.

== Healthcare and public safety ==
Kepong has one private hospital, the ParkCity Medical Centre (PMC). Previously operated by Sime Darby Healthcare, it is now under Asia OneHealthcare. It is a 300-bed, multi-disciplinary hospital with a 24-hour medical emergency centre. There is a government health office and several government clinics in Kepong, which are: Klinik Kesihatan Jinjang, Klinik Komuniti PPR Intan Baiduri, Klinik Komuniti Metro Prima, Klinik Komuniti PPR Taman Wahyu 2, and Klinik Pergigian Jinjang. Kepong also has many private clinics.

Kepong Police station is located on Jalan Kepong, just off MRR2. Other police stations in Kepong are: Jinjang Police Station, Bandar Sri Damansara Police Station, and Desa Jaya Police Station.

It is also served by 2 fire stations, Jinjang Fire and Rescue Station and Menjalara Fire and Rescue station, along with the Kepong Selangor Volunteer Fire Brigade.

== Education ==
==== National primary schools ====
- SK Kepong Baru
- SK Taman Bukit Maluri
- SK Taman Kepong
- SK Seri Kepong
- SK Taman Ehsan
- SK La Selle 1
- SK La Selle 2
- SK Intan Baiduri
- SK St. Mary

==== Chinese primary schools ====
- SJK (C) Kepong 1
- SJK (C) Kepong 2
- SJK (C) Kepong 3
- SJK (C) Jinjang Utara
- SJK (C) Jinjang Tengah 1
- SJK (C) Jinjang Tengah 2
- SJK (C) Jinjang Selatan
- SJK (C) Desa Jaya
- SJK (C) Desa Jaya 2

==== Tamil primary schools ====
- SJK (T) Ladang Edinburgh

==== National secondary schools ====
- SMK Jinjang
- SMK Kepong Baru
- SMK Menjalara
- SMK Raja Abdullah
- SMK Kepong
- SMK Sinar Bintang KL
- SMK Taman Bukit Maluri
- SMK Taman Ehsan
- SMK Agama Kuala Lumpur

==== Others ====
- The International School @ Parkcity (ISP)
- Kolej Tingkatan Enam Desa Mahkota
- SIRAJ Abu Dzar Al-Ghifari

== Religion ==
Shown below is a non-exhaustive list of religious institutions.

==== Churches ====
- Kepong Chinese Methodist Church
- Chinese Methodist Church Jinjang
- Jesus Caritas Church (Gereja Katolik Jesus Caritas)
- Kepong Grace Church

==== Chinese temples ====
- Gong Hock Keong, Lao Dua Ma (Mazu)
- Ling Hui Temple
- Kepong Yuen Leong Temple (甲洞富城園阮梁公聖佛庙)
- Kepong Tokong Ban Sin (甲洞帝沙万仙宫)
- Kepong Su Lim Kong (甲洞水濂宫)

==== Others ====
- Kuala Lumpur Tzu-Chi Jing Si Hall

== Community organisations ==
- Ti-Ratana Community Centre – Kepong
- Kepong Methodist Youth Fellowship
- Christ Evangelical Reformed Church - Kepong Growth Group
