= Sekolah Kebangsaan Sungai Tua Baharu =

Government primary school in Batu Caves, Selangor, Malaysia

Sungai Tua Baharu National School
- Sekolah Kebangsaan Sungai Tua Baharu

Location
- Jalan Melati, Kampung Sungai Tua Baharu, Batu Caves, 68100 Selangor; Malaysia; 3.255008°N 101.674041°E

Information
- Other name: SKSTB
- Former name: Sekolah Melayu Sungai Tua
- Motto: SeReSTu Catalyst for Holistic Excellence (SeReSTu Pemangkin Kecermelangan Holistik)
- Established: 1 June 1931
- Principal: Tuan Hj. Mohd. Khir bin Shafiee
- Age range: 5 years old to 12 years old
- Language: Malay, English and Arabic
- Color
- Affiliation: Ministry of Education (MoE)

Sekolah Kebangsaan Sungai Tua Baharu (SKSTB) (Jawi:سکوله کبڠساءن سوڠاي توا بهارو), is a government primary school located in Jalan Melati, Kampung Sungai Tua Baharu, Batu Caves, Selangor, Malaysia. The school is administered by the Ministry of Education Malaysia and falls under the Gombak District Education Office.

The school traces its origins to 1931, when it was established as Sekolah Melayu Sungai Tua. It was subsequently relocated to Kampung Sungai Tua Baharu in 1951, and its new school building began operating in January 1952 under the name Sekolah Kebangsaan Sungai Tua Baharu.

== History ==
=== Establishment and early years ===
The school was established on 1 June 1931 by members of the local community in Kampung Sungai Tua, near Empangan Batu. It was originally known as Sekolah Melayu Sungai Tua. In its early years, the school had approximately 30 pupils and one teacher. Its original facilities included a wooden school building with a thatched roof and two teachers' houses.

=== Relocation and renaming ===
On 15 May 1951, the school was relocated from Kampung Sungai Tua to a new settlement known as Kampung Sungai Tua Baharu. The relocation formed an important stage in the school's development and was followed by the construction of a new government school building.

The new building was completed towards the end of 1951 and came into full use on 6 January 1952. The institution became known as Sekolah Kebangsaan Sungai Tua Baharu, the name it has continued to use.

=== Expansion of school facilities ===
As enrolment increased, the school expanded its facilities to accommodate its growing number of pupils. The school's published history records that enrolment had reached approximately 1,980 pupils by 1995.

A school block known as Blok Berlian was constructed in 1968. Blok Delima was completed in 1976, while Blok Nilam was completed in 2000. These buildings provided additional space for classrooms and educational facilities, including a hall and science and computer laboratories.

In 2011, the older Blok Berlian building was replaced with a new four-storey building. The replacement building included classrooms, administrative offices, a bookshop, a science laboratory, a counselling room, an art room, a music room and a J-QAF room.

== Name ==
The school's name reflects its historical origins and location.

- 1931 – Sekolah Melayu Sungai Tua: The original name used when the school was established in Kampung Sungai Tua.
- 1951 – Relocation to Kampung Sungai Tua Baharu: The school moved to the new settlement on 15 May 1951.
- 1952 – Sekolah Kebangsaan Sungai Tua Baharu: The new school building came into full operation on 6 January 1952, and the school adopted the name that it uses today.

The abbreviation SKSTB is used in this article to refer to Sekolah Kebangsaan Sungai Tua Baharu.

== Location ==
Sekolah Kebangsaan Sungai Tua Baharu is situated on Jalan Melati in Kampung Sungai Tua Baharu, Batu Caves, Selangor, Malaysia. The school is administered by the Gombak District Education Office (Pejabat Pendidikan Daerah Gombak).

== See also ==
- Education in Malaysia
- List of schools in Selangor
