= History of the Rugby World Cup =

The first Rugby World Cup was held in 1987, hosted by Australia and New Zealand who pushed for the tournament to be approved. Since the first tournament, 9 others have been held at four-year intervals.

== International competition prior to the World Cup ==
Apart from regular test matches and touring sides, tournaments that resembled a world cup format – albeit not of its scale, but in terms of international nations competing, are competitions such as the Summer Olympics and the Home Nations Championship/Five Nations Championship.

Rugby union was played at the Summer Olympics on four occasions, 1900, 1908, 1920 and 1924. These competitions did not involve full national sides, and usually only had three or four participating nations at any individual event. The International Championship/Five Nations, now the Six Nations Championship, has been played since 1883. It is one of the oldest international rugby tournaments, involving only European nations.

== Early attempts ==
There are several stories that depict suggestions of staging a rugby union world cup before the 1980s. One of the earliest known pioneers was Harold Tolhurst, an Australian player who would later become a referee. It has been said that Tolhurst brought up the idea of such a tournament as early as the late 1950s. It has been said that in 1968, the International Rugby Board made it known that it did not want its unions to be a part of such a competition that resembled a world cup.

Similar ideas arose during the last years of the pre-WC era. Bill McLaughlin, who was the president of the Australian Rugby Union in 1979, suggested the idea of staging a World Cup in 1988, as the event would coincide with Australia's bicentenary celebrations.

== Early 1980s ==
In 1982, Neil Durden-Smith suggested that the world cup should be held in the United Kingdom in the mid-1980s. The IRB discussed the proposal in March 1983, but the concept did not go ahead. Another meeting was held in June 1983, where Australia put forth a proposal that would see them host the first event – if it should happen. New Zealand joined the campaign, putting forth their own proposal in March of the next year. The IRB went on to conduct a feasibility study – Australia and New Zealand joined forces to bid for the hosting of an inaugural World Cup.

The match day programme/poster for the 1987 final between France and the All Blacks.

A subsequent IRFB meeting was held in Paris in March 1985. It is known that originally, all four home nations were opposed to the idea, and the most vocal supporters were Australia, New Zealand and France. It is believed that South Africa's decision to vote in favour of the event was the turning point in the voting. South Africa voted in favour of the tournament going ahead, though they knew they would not be competing due to the sports boycott at the time. South Africa's vote saw England, followed by Wales, change to be in favour as well.

== The first tournament ==
The 1987 Rugby World Cup was hosted by both Australia and New Zealand. 32 matches were played from over a period of 22 May to 20 June. The tournament featured one African nation, three American nations, one Asian nation, seven European nations and four Oceanic nations. One notable omission was the Springboks who were not competing due to the international sports boycott.

Seven places were automatically filled by the IRFB members, with invitations being sent out to fill remaining places. In total there were 16 nations in the competition. France played Australia in one of the semi-finals with New Zealand playing Wales in the other. New Zealand became the first ever Rugby World Cup Champions, defeating France 29–9 at Eden Park in Auckland.

== 1990s ==
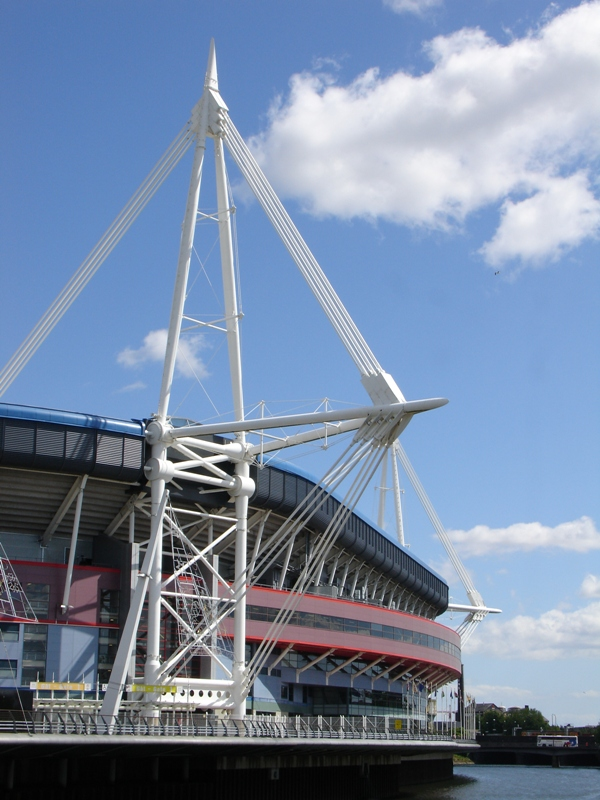
Millennium Stadium

The 1991 Rugby World Cup was hosted by Great Britain, Ireland and France, with the tournament final to be played at the home of English rugby, Twickenham. For the first time, a qualifying tournament replaced the previously used invitation format. The qualifying tournament involved 32 teams. England qualified for the final by defeating Scotland at Murrayfield, with Australia joining them by defeating New Zealand the day after. Australia won the final, defeating England 12–6, and became the first nation to win the cup away from home.

The 1995 Rugby World Cup was hosted by South Africa, and was the first time that all matches would be played in just a single country. It was the first time that South Africa participated in the tournament following the end of their international sports boycott due to the apartheid regime. South Africa won the tournament, defeating New Zealand 15–12 in the final. Joel Stransky kicked a drop-goal in extra time to grab the victory for South Africa. The All Blacks were mysteriously struck down with food poisoning just days before the final with many All Blacks still affected on the day of the final. Nelson Mandela, wearing a Springbok jersey and matching cap, famously presented the Webb Ellis Cup to South African captain Francois Pienaar. The tournament also saw the emergence of rugby's first global superstar, All Blacks winger Jonah Lomu. He and Marc Ellis finished the tournament as the top try scorers.

The 1999 Rugby World Cup was hosted by Wales with matches played in England, France, Scotland and Ireland. There were further changes to the rules of automatic qualification for this tournament, where only the top three places from 1995, along with the host nation, automatically qualified. Sixty-five rugby nations participated in qualifying competitions for the 1999 tournament, and the participating nations increased from 16 to 20. France's shock 43–31 semifinal win over the All Blacks is regarded as one of the biggest upsets and also one of the best games in the history of the World Cup. Australia defeated France in the final 35–12. They therefore became the first nation to win the World Cup twice.

== 2000 – present ==
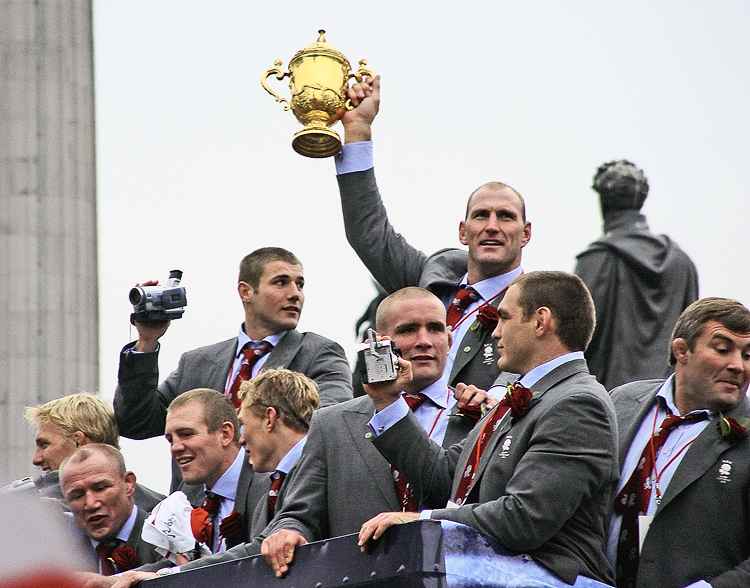
England celebrates in London.

The 2003 World Cup was hosted by Australia. It was originally to be co-hosted with New Zealand, but disagreements over scheduling and signage at venues led to Australia going it alone. England won the tournament, defeating Australia in the final 20 points to 17. With 21 seconds left before sudden death England's Jonny Wilkinson landed a drop goal to win the match. England became the first Northern Hemisphere nation to win a Rugby World Cup. Upon returning home, the English side was greeted by an estimated 750,000 people at a street parade celebrating their victory.

The 2007 World Cup was held in France, with matches also played in Wales and Scotland. The tournament was won by South Africa, who defeated England 15–6 in the final to become World Champions for the second time. Blowouts in scores in pool matches against minnow nations changed into a finals series dominated by defence. This tournament was notable for Argentina becoming the first team from outside the Six Nations and Tri-Nations to reach the semifinals. They ended up coming third in the tournament, which was the first time the top 3 slots were not dominated by either New Zealand, Australia, England, South Africa, France or Wales. This tournament was the first time that both Australia and New Zealand did not progress past the quarter-finals.

The 2011 tournament was hosted by New Zealand: it saw a repeat of the 1987 World Cup finale standings, as Australia took on Wales in the Bronze final and won 21–18, while New Zealand, by defeating France 8–7 in the final, became the first nation to win on home soil twice. This tournament was notable for the fact that France lost twice in the pool stages, to NZ and Tonga, and yet somehow managed to progress all the way to the Final to face off with NZ one more time.

The 2015 tournament was hosted by England. The tournament was won by New Zealand, who defeated Australia 34–17 to become the first nation to successfully defend their World Champion title and the first nation to win the tournament three times. This was the first time New Zealand had won the cup away from home. This tournament is notable for the controversial Pool of Death that occurred which saw Australia, England and Wales fight to get a place in the quarter-finals; the pool draw taking place in December 2012. Going into the tournament, England, Wales and Australia were all ranked in the top five in the world rankings. England became the second Host nation, after Wales in 1991, not to make it out of the Pools. This also became the first Rugby World Cup to have all Northern Hemisphere competition knocked out in the quarter-finals, with Argentina, South Africa, Australia and New Zealand progressing through to the semi-finals. This World Cup was also remembered for the biggest upset in Rugby history, when Japan beat South Africa 34 - 32 in the pool stages and came very close to making their first Quarter-finals.

The 2019 tournament was hosted in Japan, It was won by South Africa after they defeated England in the final. Some notable things that happened in this tournament were when Uruguay got their first RWC win since 2003, beating Fiji 30–27. Japan became the first quarter finalist from Asia, and the first Tier 2 nation to win a pool, with famous victories over Ireland (19–12) and Scotland (28–21). New Zealand lost their first RWC game since 2007 when England defeated them in the semi-finals 19–7.

On 15 November 2017 France was announced as host of the 2023 Rugby World Cup.The tournament was won by South Africa, who defeated New Zealand 12–11 to become the second nation to successfully defend their World Champion title and the first nation to win the tournament four times. This was the second time and only nation that South Africa had won the cup after they lost a match in pool stage.

== Overview ==
Year	Host	Final venue	Teams	Participants in Qualifying	Matches played	Winner	Runner-up
1987	Australia & New Zealand	Eden Park	16	Invitation	32	New Zealand	France
1991	England; France; Ireland; Scotland; Wales	Twickenham	16	32	32	Australia	England
1995	South Africa	Ellis Park	16	52	32	South Africa	New Zealand
1999	Wales	Millennium Stadium	20	65	41	Australia (2)	France
2003	Australia	Telstra Stadium	20	80	48	England	Australia
2007	France	Stade de France	20	91	48	South Africa (2)	England
2011	New Zealand	Eden Park	20	93	48	New Zealand (2)	France
2015	England	Twickenham	20	96	48	New Zealand (3)	Australia
2019	Japan	Yokohoma Stadium	20	93	45	South Africa (3)	England
2023	France	Stade de France	20	TBD	48	South Africa (4)	New Zealand

== Overall team performance records ==
The following table shows the overall performance records of the teams from the Six Nations and The Rugby Championship, plus the teams that made the knock-out stages (the quarter-finals) in at least one of the World Cups played so far. If they played in the tournament, the entries in the table show the stage at which they were knocked out, or whether they won the tournament. The second part of the table shows the number of times a team has reached that stage of the competition. For a more comprehensive table of the performance records of all the teams over the history of the World Cup, see National team appearances in the Rugby World Cup. Only Italy have played in all 9 world cups without getting past the group stages. For the all-time table of national teams that have featured in the Rugby World Cup by a number of criteria including matches, wins, losses, draws, total points for, total points against, etc., see Rugby World Cup Overall Record.

Team	1987	1991	1995	1999	2003	2007	2011	2015	2019	2023	Quarter-finals	Semi-finals	Finals	Titles
South Africa^{(1)}	DNP	DNP	W	SF	QF	W	QF	SF	W	W	8	6	4	4
New Zealand	W	SF	F	SF	SF	QF	W	W	SF	F	10	9	5	3
Australia	SF	W	QF	W	F	QF	SF	F	QF	Group	9	6	4	2
England	QF	F	SF	QF	W	F	QF	Group	F	SF	9	6	4	1
France	F	QF	SF	F	SF	SF	F	QF	QF	QF	10	6	3	0
Wales	SF	Group	Group	QF	QF	Group	SF	QF	SF	QF	7	3	0	0
Argentina	Group	Group	Group	QF	Group	SF	QF	SF	Group	SF	5	3	0	0
Scotland	QF	SF	QF	QF	QF	QF	Group	QF	Group	Group	7	1	0	0
Ireland	QF	QF	QF	QF Play-Off	QF	Group	QF	QF	QF	QF	8	0	0	0
Fiji^{(3)}	QF	Group	DNQ	QF Play-Off	Group	QF	Group	Group	Group	QF	3	0	0	0
Samoa^{(2)}	DNP	QF	QF	QF Play-Off	Group	Group	Group	Group	Group	Group	2	0	0	0
Canada	Group	QF	Group	Group	Group	Group	Group	Group	Group	DNQ	1	0	0	0
Japan	Group	Group	Group	Group	Group	Group	Group	Group	QF	Group	1	0	0	0

=== Defending champions ===
Only New Zealand, in 2015, and South Africa, in 2023 have successfully defended their title in the World Cup. The stage at which the defending champions were knocked out has been: 1991 – SF – New Zealand knocked out by Australia; 1995 – QF – Australia knocked out by England; 1999 – SF – South Africa knocked out by Australia; 2003 – F – Australia knocked out by England; 2007 – F – England knocked out by South Africa; 2011 - QF - South Africa knocked out by Australia; 2019 - SF - New Zealand knocked out by England. Australia's loss in the quarter-finals in 1995, and South Africa's loss in the quarter-finals in 2011 are the worst performances by the defending champions.

=== Knockout statistics ===
For the teams that made the knock-out stages (quarter-finals) of the World Cup, the following table shows which team knocked them out of the competition, unless they won. England have knocked out Australia four times, including in the 2003 final. In the same time, England have been knocked out four times by South Africa, including in the 2007 final and the 2019 final. France have been knocked out three times by both New Zealand and England, while the All Blacks have also eliminated Scotland three times.

Team	1987 lost to	1991 lost to	1995 lost to	1999 lost to	2003 lost to	2007 lost to	2011 lost to	2015 lost to	2019 lost to	2023 lost to
South Africa^{(1)}	DNP	DNP	W	Australia	New Zealand	W	Australia	New Zealand	W	W
New Zealand	W	Australia	South Africa	France	Australia	France	W	W	England	South Africa
Australia	France	W	England	W	England	England	New Zealand	New Zealand	England	PS
England	Wales	Australia	New Zealand	South Africa	W	South Africa	France	PS	South Africa	South Africa
France	New Zealand	England	South Africa	Australia	England	England	New Zealand	New Zealand	Wales	South Africa
Wales	New Zealand	PS	PS	Australia	England	PS	France	South Africa	South Africa	Argentina
Argentina	PS	PS	PS	France	PS	South Africa	New Zealand	Australia	PS	New Zealand
Scotland	New Zealand	England	New Zealand	New Zealand	Australia	Argentina	PS	Australia	PS	PS
Ireland	Australia	Australia	France	Argentina^{(4)}	France	PS	Wales	Argentina	New Zealand	New Zealand
Fiji^{(3)}	France	PS	DNQ	England^{(4)}	PS	South Africa	PS	PS	PS	England
Samoa^{(2)}	DNP	Scotland	South Africa	Scotland^{(4)}	PS	PS	PS	PS	PS	PS
Canada	PS	New Zealand	PS	PS	PS	PS	PS	PS	PS	DNQ
Japan	PS	PS	PS	PS	PS	PS	PS	PS	South Africa	PS

=== All-time qualified teams ===
This table shows all teams to ever qualify for the final tournament, ranked by last participation.

Team	1987	1991	1995	1999	2003	2007	2011	2015	2019	2023	2027
New Zealand	⏺	⏺	⏺	⏺	⏺	⏺	⏺	⏺	⏺	⏺	⏺
Australia	⏺	⏺	⏺	⏺	⏺	⏺	⏺	⏺	⏺	⏺	⏺
England	⏺	⏺	⏺	⏺	⏺	⏺	⏺	⏺	⏺	⏺	⏺
France	⏺	⏺	⏺	⏺	⏺	⏺	⏺	⏺	⏺	⏺	⏺
Scotland	⏺	⏺	⏺	⏺	⏺	⏺	⏺	⏺	⏺	⏺	⏺
Ireland	⏺	⏺	⏺	⏺	⏺	⏺	⏺	⏺	⏺	⏺	⏺
Wales	⏺	⏺	⏺	⏺	⏺	⏺	⏺	⏺	⏺	⏺	⏺
Japan	⏺	⏺	⏺	⏺	⏺	⏺	⏺	⏺	⏺	⏺	⏺
Italy	⏺	⏺	⏺	⏺	⏺	⏺	⏺	⏺	⏺	⏺	⏺
Argentina	⏺	⏺	⏺	⏺	⏺	⏺	⏺	⏺	⏺	⏺	⏺
Samoa		⏺	⏺	⏺	⏺	⏺	⏺	⏺	⏺	⏺	⏺
Fiji	⏺	⏺		⏺	⏺	⏺	⏺	⏺	⏺	⏺	⏺
Tonga	⏺		⏺	⏺	⏺	⏺	⏺	⏺	⏺	⏺	⏺
South Africa			⏺	⏺	⏺	⏺	⏺	⏺	⏺	⏺	⏺
Namibia				⏺	⏺	⏺	⏺	⏺	⏺	⏺	
Georgia					⏺	⏺	⏺	⏺	⏺	⏺	⏺
Uruguay				⏺	⏺			⏺	⏺	⏺	⏺
Romania	⏺	⏺	⏺	⏺	⏺	⏺	⏺	⏺		⏺	⏺
Portugal						⏺				⏺	⏺
Chile										⏺	⏺
Canada	⏺	⏺	⏺	⏺	⏺	⏺	⏺	⏺	⏺		⏺
United States	⏺	⏺		⏺	⏺	⏺	⏺	⏺	⏺		⏺
Russia							⏺		⏺		
Spain				⏺							⏺
Ivory Coast			⏺								
Zimbabwe	⏺	⏺									⏺
Hong Kong China											⏺

== See also ==
- History of rugby union
- National team appearances in the Rugby World Cup
