= SMK Hillcrest =

Public secondary school in Gombak, Selangor, Malaysia

SMK Hillcrest English: Hillcrest National Middle School
- Batu Caves, Selangor; Malaysia

Information
- Type: Public School, Secondary School
- Motto: Ilmu Panduan Hidup (English: Knowledge; Guidance in life)
- Established: 1 December 1992; 33 years ago
- Founder: Tan Sri Zaleha Ismail
- Principal: Datin Azura binti Abd Aziz
- Grades: First form to fifth form
- Enrolment: ±2000
- Colours: Red, Yellow, Blue
- Rival: SMK Taman Melawati
- Yearbook: Majalah Bestari
- Affiliations: Ministry Of Education Malaysia
- Abbreviation: SMKHC
- Website: Ministry of Education: SMK Hillcrest

Sekolah Menengah Kebangsaan Hillcrest is a public school situated in Taman Sri Gombak and is regarded as one of the schools in the state of Selangor in Malaysia. The school is widely known as ""Hillcrest"" among students of the school itself and the community.

== History ==
The school construction was started in 1989 and the first block was completed in 1991, hence opening on 1 December 1990. The school area was originally an estate of 8.2 hectares. The school was named Hillcrest, by the Gombak Prefecture Education Office, after the developing company that have developed the neighborhood that the school is intended to serve, the Taman Seri Gombak neighborhood.

Encik Irwan Tan Abdullah, who was the then-senior assistant, was elected as the first acting-principal on 1 December 1992. The first principal is Puan Sukma Murni Bt Abdul Samad. During that time, only the Munsyi building is in operation and the other building, the Sri Lanang building was still under construction. Kajai building was officially completed in 1996. With the operation of the new building, the school now have a Kemahiran Hidup Lab (Life Skills Labs), three science labs and another two new classrooms in operation.

On 1 July 1997, Puan Rohani Bt Bakar became the principal succeeding the first principal, Puan Sukma Murni. She served the school for six months before she is transferred to SMK Melawati. She was then succeeded by Puan Hodaima Bt Haji Halil. She served seven years before her retirement in 2005. Pn Kamalyah Bt Teh Mohamed followed. Pn Nik Maryam bt Idris whom joined the school in 2007 succeeded Pn Kamalyah. Later in 2011, Pn Sharifah Bt Mamat succeeded Pn Nik Maryam. She is currently the incumbent principal. Starting from the year of 2009, the school is accepting Form 6 students for both Science and Arts Stream. Both the Zaaba and Sri Lanang blocks are occupied by Form 6 students. There are currently 130 Arts stream students and 160 Science stream students for Form 6.

== See also ==
- List of schools in Selangor
