= National team appearances in the Rugby World Cup =

This article presents the national team appearances in the Rugby World Cup. The article tracks the appearances, results, and debuts for all national teams that have participated in at least one Rugby World Cup.

== Number of appearances ==
Tournament appearances by team, up to and including 2027:

Team	Apps	Record streak	Active streak	Debut	Most recent	Best result
South Africa	9	9	9	1995	2027	Champions (1995, 2007, 2019, 2023)
New Zealand	11	11	11	1987	2027	Champions (1987, 2011, 2015)
Australia	11	11	11	1987	2027	Champions (1991, 1999)
England	11	11	11	1987	2027	Champions (2003)
France	11	11	11	1987	2027	Runners-up (1987, 1999, 2011)
Wales	11	11	11	1987	2027	Third place (1987)
Argentina	11	11	11	1987	2027	Third place (2007)
Scotland	11	11	11	1987	2027	Fourth place (1991)
Ireland	11	11	11	1987	2027	Quarter-finals (eight times)
Fiji	10	8	8	1987	2027	Quarter-finals (1987, 2007, 2023)
Samoa	10	10	10	1991	2027	Quarter-finals (1991, 1995)
Japan	11	11	11	1987	2027	Quarter-finals (2019)
Canada	10	9	1	1987	2027	Quarter-finals (1991)
Italy	11	11	11	1987	2027	2 wins (six times)
Tonga	10	9	9	1987	2027	2 wins (2007, 2011)
Georgia	7	7	7	2003	2027	2 wins (2015)
Portugal	3	2	2	2007	2027	1 win and 1 draw (2023)
Romania	10	8	2	1987	2027	1 win (six times)
Uruguay	6	4	4	1999	2027	1 win (1999, 2003, 2019, 2023)
United States	9	6	1	1987	2027	1 win (1987, 2003, 2011)
Namibia	7	7	7	1999	2023	1 draw (2019)
Zimbabwe	3	2	1	1987	2027	0 wins
Ivory Coast	1	1	0	1995	1995	0 wins
Spain	2	1	1	1999	2027	0 wins
Russia	2	1	0	2011	2019	0 wins
Chile	2	1	1	2023	2027	0 wins
Hong Kong	1	1	1	2027	2027	0 wins

== Results by tournament ==
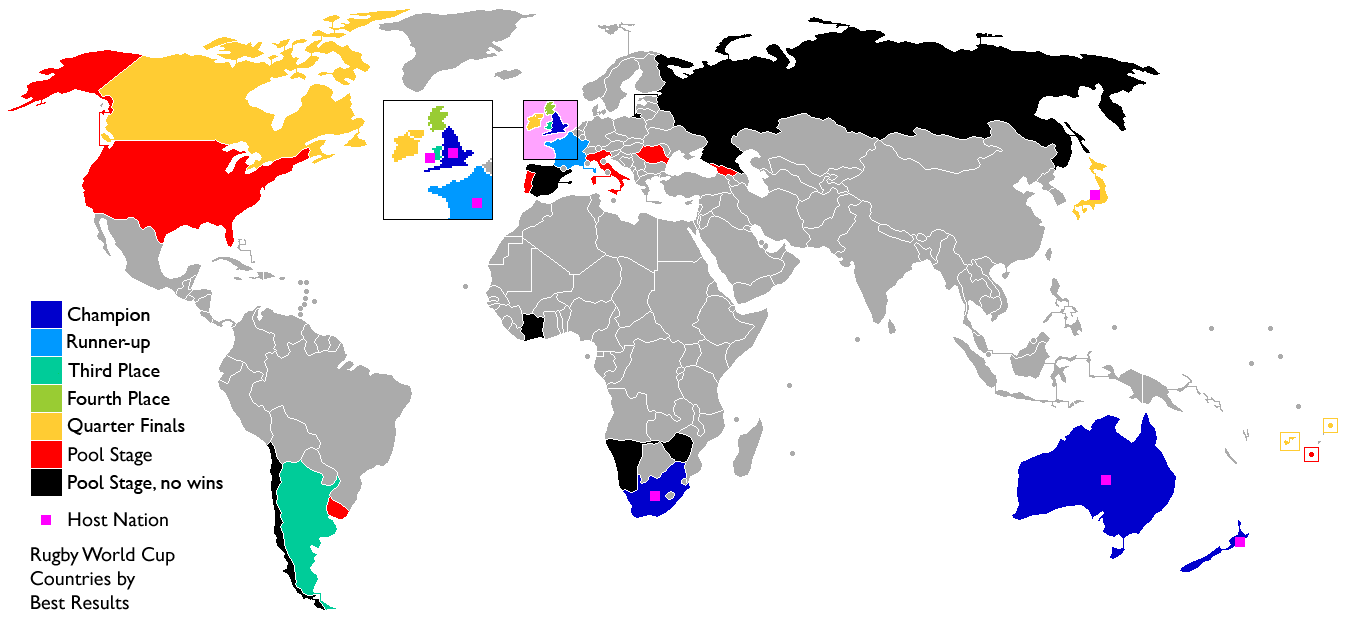
Map of countries' best results (click to enlarge)

Legend

- QF — Quarterfinalist
- R2 — Round 2 (1999: quarterfinal playoffs)
- R1 — Round 1 (pool stage)
- Q — Qualified
- •• — Invited but declined or qualified but withdrew
- • — Did not qualify
- × — Expelled after qualification/Disqualified
- — Not invited (1987) / Did not enter or withdrew from qualifying
- — Hosts

For each tournament, the number of teams in each finals tournament (in brackets) are shown.

Team	1987 (New Zealand) (Australia) (16)	1991 (England) (France) (Ireland) (Scotland) (Wales) (16)	1995 (South Africa) (16)	1999 (Wales) ( (England) ) ( (France) ) ( (Ireland) ) ( (Scotland) ) (20)	2003 (Australia) (20)	2007 (France) ( (Scotland) ) ( (Wales) ) (20)	2011 (New Zealand) (20)	2015 (England) ( (Wales) ) (20)	2019 (Japan) (20)	2023 (France) (20)	2027 (Australia) (24)	2031 (United States) (24)
Africa
Ivory Coast		•	R1; 15th	•	•	•	•	•	•	•	•	TBD
Namibia			•	R1; 17th	R1; 20th	R1; 20th	R1; 20th	R1; 18th	R1; 16th	R1; 19th	•	TBD
South Africa^{(3)}			1st	3rd	QF; 5th	1st	QF; 5th	3rd	1st	1st	Q	TBD
Zimbabwe	R1; 15th	R1; 14th	•	•	•	•	•	•	•	•	Q	TBD
Asia
Hong Kong		•	•	•	•	•	•	•	•	•	Q	TBD
Japan	R1; 14th	R1; 9th	R1; 14th	R1; 18th	R1; 18th	R1; 16th	R1; 17th	R1; 9th	QF; 5th	R1; 12th	Q	TBD
Europe
England	QF; 6th	2nd	4th	QF; 6th	1st	2nd	QF; 6th	R1; 10th	2nd	3rd	Q	TBD
France	2nd	QF; 5th	3rd	2nd	4th	4th	2nd	QF; 8th	QF; 8th	QF; 6th	Q	TBD
Georgia	••^{(1)}		•	•	R1; 19th	R1; 13th	R1; 15th	R1; 12th	R1; 14th	R1; 17th	Q	TBD
Ireland	QF; 7th	QF; 6th	QF; 8th	R2; 10th	QF; 6th	R1; 11th	QF; 7th	QF; 5th	QF; 6th	QF; 5th	Q	TBD
Italy	R1; 12th	R1; 10th	R1; 10th	R1; 19th	R1; 12th	R1; 12th	R1; 11th	R1; 11th	R1; 9th	R1; 11th	Q	TBD
Portugal		•	•	•	•	R1; 19th	•	•	•	R1; 14th	Q	TBD
Romania	R1; 10th	R1; 12th	R1; 16th	R1; 13th	R1; 15th	R1; 15th	R1; 19th	R1; 16th	•^{(4)}	R1; 20th	Q	TBD
Russia	••^{(1)}		•	•	•	•	R1; 18th	•	R1; 20th	•^{(6)}	•^{(6)}	TBD
Scotland	QF; 5th	4th	QF; 5th	QF; 7th	QF; 8th	QF; 7th	R1; 9th	QF; 6th	R1; 10th	R1; 10th	Q	TBD
Spain		•	•	R1; 20th	•	•	•	•	•^{(4)}	×^{(5)}	Q	TBD
Wales	3rd	R1; 11th	R1; 9th	QF; 5th	QF; 7th	R1; 9th	4th	QF; 7th	4th	QF; 7th	Q	TBD
North America
Canada	R1; 9th	QF; 8th	R1; 11th	R1; 12th	R1; 14th	R1; 17th	R1; 13th	R1; 17th	R1; 18th	•	Q	TBD
United States	R1; 11th	R1; 16th	•	R1; 16th	R1; 13th	R1; 18th	R1; 16th	R1; 19th	R1; 19th	•	Q	Q
Oceania
Australia	4th	1st	QF; 7th	1st	2nd	QF; 6th	3rd	2nd	QF; 7th	R1; 9th	Q	TBD
Fiji	QF; 8th	R1; 15th	•	R2; 9th	R1; 11th	QF; 8th	R1; 14th	R1; 15th	R1; 12th	QF; 8th	Q	TBD
New Zealand	1st	3rd	2nd	4th	3rd	QF; 5th	1st	1st	3rd	2nd	Q	TBD
Samoa^{(2)}		QF; 7th	QF; 6th	R2; 11th	R1; 10th	R1; 14th	R1; 10th	R1; 13th	R1; 15th	R1; 13th	Q	TBD
Tonga	R1; 16th	•	R1; 12th	R1; 14th	R1; 17th	R1; 10th	R1; 12th	R1; 14th	R1; 13th	R1; 15th	Q	TBD
South America
Argentina	R1; 13th	R1; 13th	R1; 13th	QF; 8th	R1; 9th	3rd	QF; 8th	4th	R1; 11th	4th	Q	TBD
Chile			•	•	•	•	•	•	•	R1; 18th	Q	TBD
Uruguay			•	R1; 15th	R1; 16th	•	•	R1; 20th	R1; 17th	R1; 16th	Q	TBD
Team	1987 (16)	1991 (16)	1995 (16)	1999 (20)	2003 (20)	2007 (20)	2011 (20)	2015 (20)	2019 (20)	2023 (20)	2027 (24)	2031 (24)

- ^{1} Georgia and Russia were part of the Soviet Union in 1987, whose national team declined an invitation to the inaugural World Cup on political grounds.
- ^{2} Samoa was known as Western Samoa until 1997.
- ^{3} South Africa did not compete in 1987 and 1991 while subject to an international sporting boycott in opposition to the country's apartheid regime.
- ^{4} Romania and Spain fielded ineligible players during the Rugby Europe Championship, incurring points deductions resulting in their non-qualification in 2019.
- ^{5} Spain had initially qualified, but were deducted 10 points for fielding an ineligible player in two qualifying games, resulting in Spain losing their place.
- ^{6} Russia did not compete in 2023 and 2027 while subject to the Russian invasion of Ukraine, World Rugby and Rugby Europe suspended Russia from international and European continental rugby union competition and Rugby Union of Russia was suspended from World Rugby and Rugby Europe.

== Debut of national teams ==
26 nations have thus far qualified for the Rugby World Cup. From 1987 until 2011, each edition featured at least one new debuting country. The 2015 tournament was the first edition with no country making its debut. It simply featured the return of Uruguay after not qualifying for the 2007 and 2011 editions. The 2019 was the same, with Romania disqualified and replaced by Russia.

Year	Nation(s)	Total
1987	Argentina; Australia; Canada; England; Fiji; France; Ireland; Italy; Japan; New Zealand; Romania; Scotland; Tonga; United States; Wales; Zimbabwe	16
1991	Samoa	1
1995	Ivory Coast; South Africa	2
1999	Namibia; Spain; Uruguay	3
2003	Georgia	1
2007	Portugal	1
2011	Russia	1
2015	(none)	0
2019	(none)	0
2023	Chile	1
2027	Hong Kong	1

== Result of host nations ==
The best result by hosts is champions, achieved by New Zealand in 1987 and 2011, and by South Africa in 1995. The worst result was by Wales in 1991 with only one win in pool play, although they did not host the final. The worst result by a country who hosted the final is held by England, being eliminated in the group stage in 2015.

Year	Host nation	Finish
1987	New Zealand	Champions
1987	Australia	Fourth place
1991	England	Runners-up
1991	Scotland	Fourth place
1991	France	Quarter-finals
1991	Ireland	Quarter-finals
1991	Wales	Group stage
1995	South Africa	Champions
1999	Wales	Quarter-finals
2003	Australia	Runners-up
2007	France	Fourth place
2011	New Zealand	Champions
2015	England	Group stage
2019	Japan	Quarter-finals
2023	France	Quarter-finals
2027	Australia	To be determined
2031	United States	To be determined

== Results of defending champions ==
New Zealand and South Africa are the only nations to successfully defend the World Cup as defending champions in 2015 and 2023 respectively. Australia and England achieved runner up in 2003 and 2007, respectively. The worst results were by Australia in 1995 and South Africa in 2011, both exiting in the quarter-finals.

Year	Defending champions	Finish
1991	New Zealand	Third place
1995	Australia	Quarter-finals
1999	South Africa	Third place
2003	Australia	Runners-up
2007	England	Runners-up
2011	South Africa	Quarter-finals
2015	New Zealand	Champions
2019	New Zealand	Third place
2023	South Africa	Champions
2027	South Africa	To be determined

== Performance by confederation ==
This is a summary of the best performances of each confederation in each tournament.

Confederation	1987 (16)	1991 (16)	1995 (16)	1999 (20)	2003 (20)	2007 (20)	2011 (20)	2015 (20)	2019 (20)	2023 (20)	2027 (24)	2031 (24)
Africa	R1	R1	1st	3rd	QF	1st	QF	3rd	1st	1st	TBD	TBD
Asia	R1	R1	R1	R1	R1	R1	R1	R1	QF	R1	TBD	TBD
Europe	2nd	2nd	3rd	2nd	1st	2nd	2nd	QF	2nd	3rd	TBD	TBD
North America	R1	QF	R1	R1	R1	R1	R1	R1	R1	—	TBD	TBD
Oceania	1st	1st	2nd	1st	2nd	QF	1st	1st	3rd	2nd	TBD	TBD
South America	R1	R1	R1	QF	R1	3rd	QF	4th	R1	4th	TBD	TBD

== Number of teams by confederation ==
This is a summary of the total number of participating teams by confederation in each tournament.

Confederation	1987 (16)	1991 (16)	1995 (16)	1999 (20)	2003 (20)	2007 (20)	2011 (20)	2015 (20)	2019 (20)	2023 (20)	2027 (24)	2031 (24)
Africa	1	1	2	2	2	2	2	2	2	2	2	TBD
Asia	1	1	1	1	1	1	1	1	1	1	2	TBD
Europe	7	7	7	8	8	9	9	8	8	9	10	TBD
North America	2	2	1	2	2	2	2	2	2	0	2	TBD
Oceania	4	4	4	5	5	5	5	5	5	5	5	TBD
South America	1	1	1	2	2	1	1	2	2	3	3	TBD

== Appearance droughts ==
This section is a list of droughts associated with the participation of national rugby union teams in the Rugby World Cups.

=== Longest Active Droughts ===
Does not include teams that have not yet made their first appearance or teams that no longer exist.

Team	Last Appearance	WC Missed
Ivory Coast	1995	8
Russia	2019	2

=== Longest Overall Droughts ===
Only includes droughts begun after a team's first appearance and until the team ceased to exist updated to include qualification for the 2027 Rugby World Cup.

Team	Previous appearance	Next appearance	WC Missed
Ivory Coast	1995	Active	8
Zimbabwe	1991	2027	8
Spain	1999	2027	6
Portugal	2007	2023	3
Russia	2019	Active	2
Uruguay	2003	2015	2

== See also ==
- History of the Rugby World Cup
- Rugby World Cup qualification
- Rugby World Cup Overall Record
