= Bukit Sri Bintang =

Hill in Kuala Lumpur

Coordinates: 3°10′50″N 101°38′32″E

Bukit Sri Bintang is forested twin hill in Kepong, Kuala Lumpur, Malaysia. It is actually part of a more extensive forested area which extends south as far as Bukit Kiara and is separated from this area by the E1 New Klang Valley Expressway. The highest peak of the hill is 212 metres above sea level.
