= Sekolah Menengah Kebangsaan Seksyen 3 Bandar Kinrara =

Secondary school in Selangor Darul Ehsan, Malaysia

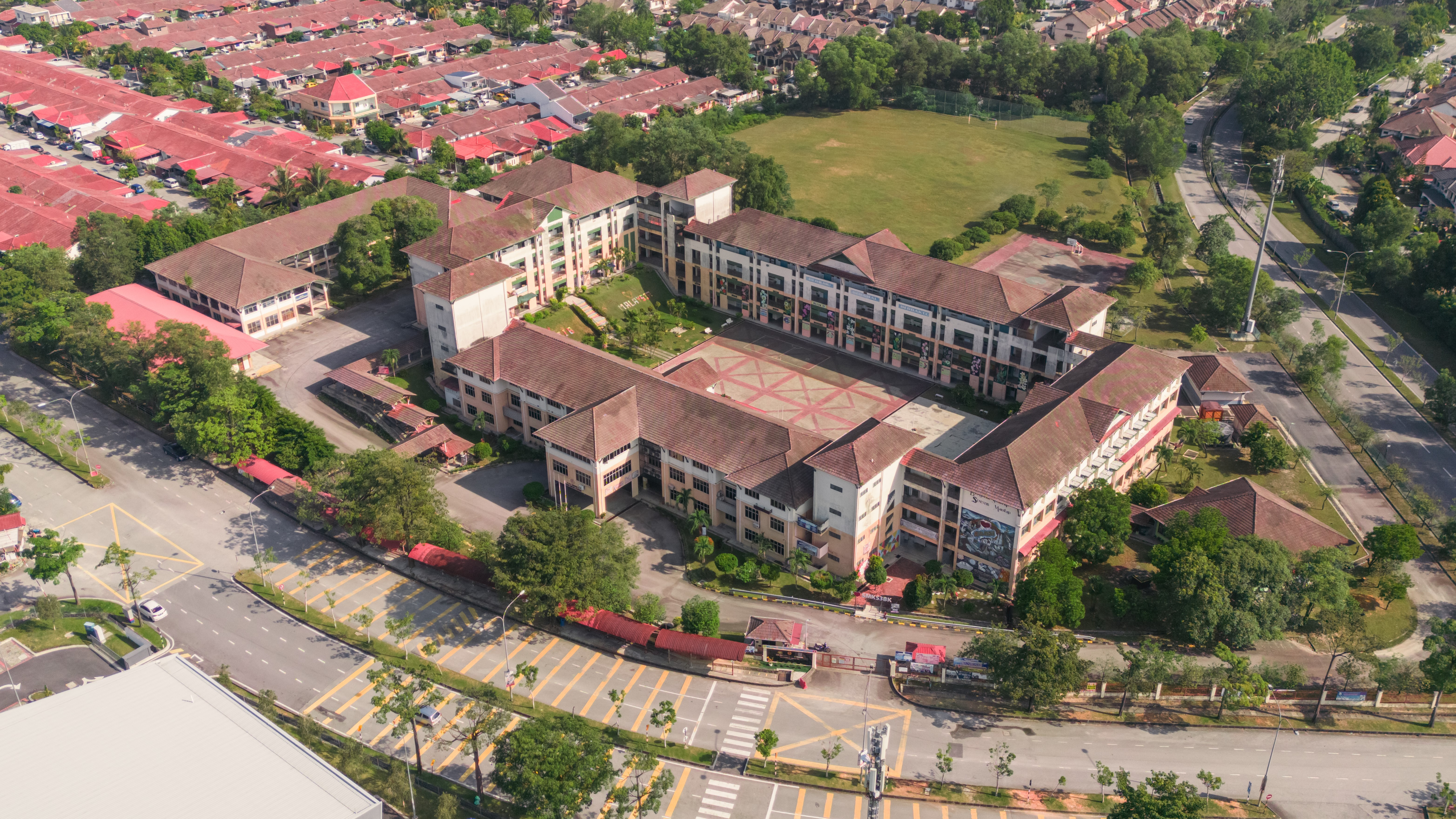
- Aerial View of Sekolah Menengah Kebangsaan Seksyen 3 Bandar Kinrara

Location
- Jalan BK5B, Bandar Kinrara; Selangor Darul Ehsan 47180; Malaysia; 3°02′17.2″N 101°38′31.9″E

Information
- Type: co-educational
- Motto: Berilmu Beramal Berbakti
- Established: 1 December 2001
- School district: Petaling District
- Session: Morning, Afternoon
- Language: Bahasa Malaysia, English, Mandarin, Tamil
- Campus size: 25,159 square metres
- Website: http://smkseksyen3bandarkinrara.com/
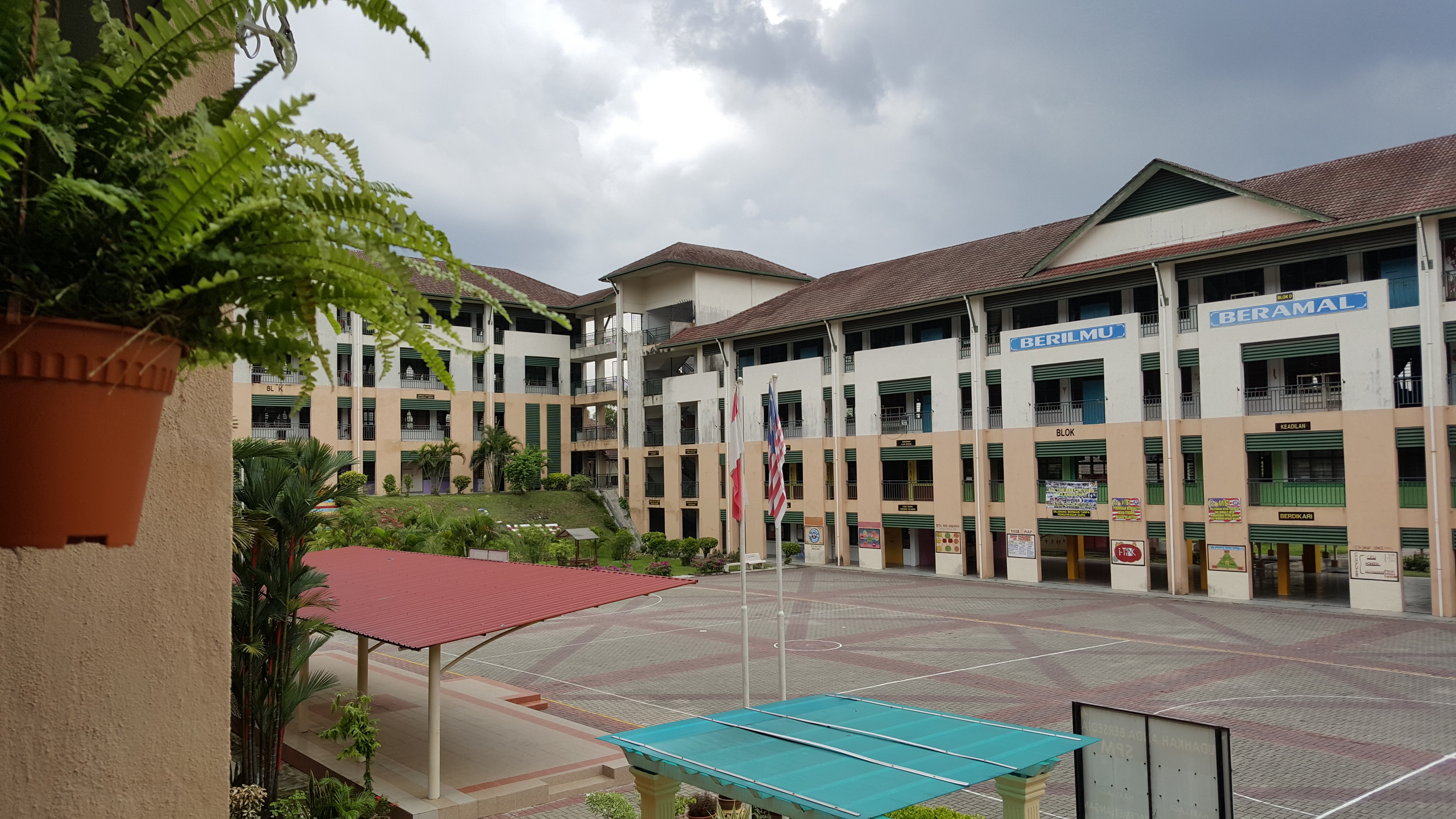
- Assembly View of Sekolah Menengah Kebangsaan Seksyen 3 Bandar Kinrara

Sekolah Menengah Kebangsaan Seksyen 3 Bandar Kinrara or SMK Seksyen 3 Bandar Kinrara (Chinese: 金銮镇第三区国中, literally meaning Kinrara Section 3 Secondary School), is a secondary national school located in Jalan Kinrara 5B, Bandar Kinrara.

In 2009, SMK Seksyen 3 Bandar Kinrara accommodated 691 male students and 614 female students, housing a total number of 1,305 students. The number of teachers was 64.^{2009}

== History ==
SMK Seksyen 3 Bandar Kinrara opened on 1 December 2001. Most students then were from primary schools such as SK Seksyen 2 Bandar Kinrara, SK Seksyen 1 Bandar Kinrara, SJK(T) Castlefield, SJK(T) Kinrara, SJK(T) Puchong, SK Seafield, SJK(C) Sedang Baru, SK Puchong Jaya 2, SK Pusat Bandar Puchong 1, SJK(C) Lick Hung and SJK(C) Yak Chee. Schooling began on 7 January 2002 with 18 qualified tutors, 2 office staff and 79 students. The school had 3 blocks of 2-story and 3 blocks of 1-story buildings, which also consisted of bengkel, canteen and surau. The area of the school is 25,159 square metres including a school field, basketball court, classrooms, canteen and surau.

In 2012, Shamsul Azha bin Md Yusuf, the newly designated principal, took helm of the institution. He was known for renaming the school, which was then called "SEMESTI" into "SEMESTIB" because the former name was used by another school elsewhere. It was also the year the school began having afternoon session classes for students of Forms 1 and 2.

In 2014, the school's drama club achieved a new feat by representing the state Selangor.

In 2016, Tan Siew Hong began to hold the position of Afternoon Vice Principal, assisting Hajah Omme Kalthom binti Md Sharif in governing the afternoon session.

In 2019, the school drama team "Excess Baggage," led by Suneeta Devi, won first place at the National Level English Language Drama Competition for the first time.

In 2022, Murti officially resigned as the head of the discipline teacher. Mak Sheng Ming soon took the title.

== Achievements ==
On March 25, 2015, a total of six students achieved straight A's for SPM 2014. The principal of the school expressed that although the number of straight A achievers dropped, the number of students who passed increased.

In 2015, SMK Seksyen 3 Bandar Kinrara has won the "Yayasan Palan Top Initiative for English Language Teaching In School’ award, with a winning prize of five thousand Malaysian Ringgit.

In 2016, the school's drama club, represented Selangor for the second time, this time winning second place in the National English Drama competition. The drama club will continue participating for 2017.

During the Berjaya TeenStar Challenge 2016, the school came in second place in the band category, beaten by SMK Damansara Jaya.

Alumnus and Yang di-Pertuan Agong Scholarship Recipient Nurfatihah Zulkifli pursues her Doctrine in Vaccinology at the University of Malaya, citing that 1903 Nobel Prize Winner Marie Curie is her role model is her pursuit to be a female scientist.

== See also ==
- List of schools in Selangor
