= SMK Taman Seraya =

Sekolah Menengah Kebangsaan Taman Seraya

Location
- Jalan Bunga Melati 8 Ampang, Selangor, 56100; Malaysia

Information
- School type: Government-aided National Secondary School
- Motto: Berilmu, Harmonis, Berbakti (Knowledgeable, Harmonised, Contributive)
- Established: January 1989
- School code: BEA4610
- Principal: Encik Busrah Bin Maulah
- Grades: Form 1-5
- Yearbook: Puncak
- Alumni: Serayans
- Website: Sekolah Menengah Kebangsaan Taman Seraya

Sekolah Menengah Kebangsaan Taman Seraya (SMK Taman Seraya) is a secondary school located in Selangor, Malaysia. It was established in 1989. The school moved to its current location in November, 1998. When it first opened, the school had 212 students and eight teachers and operated between 13:15 and 18:41 each day. The first principal was Encik Bisri bin Singat.

The school is made up of four separate blocks. The construction of the fourth block began in 1994 and opened for use in 1998.

The PMR exam started in September 1991. SMKTS achieved a 78.8% pass rate.

In 1997, the school was renamed Sekolah Menengah Kebangsaan Taman Seraya and in 1998, it was upgraded from Grade C to Grade A.

== Principals ==
- Encik Bisri bin Singat ( 1989 -1991 )
- Cik Kemariah Sidik ( August 1991 - October 1991 )
- Tuan Haji Mohammed Sabudin bin Tamsir ( October 1992 - December 1994 )
- Puan Zakiah Md. Lassim ( May 1995 - 1997 )
- Puan Petri Noor Jalilah ( 1997 - March 1998 )
- Datin Hajah Halimah ( 1998 - December 2001 )
- Cik Kemariah Mohd Sidik ( January 2003 - April 2006 )
- Datin Mazilah Binti Ahmad Mansur ( June 2006 - January 2008 )
- Puan Siti Zaharah Binti Abdul Kadir ( February 2008 - 2011 )
- Tuan Haji Hassan Bin Che Ling ( 2012 - 2014 )
- Puan Tukinah Binti Sadi ( 2014 - 2017 )
- Puan Wan Norma Bt Wan Pi ( 2017 - 2019 )
- Encik Busrah Bin Maulah (2020–2024 )
