= SBP Integrasi Gombak =

- INTEGOMB

Location
- Batu 8, Jalan Sungai Pusu, 53100; Gombak, Selangor; Malaysia

Information
- Type: Public boarding school
- Motto: Benar, Tepat, Efektif (True, Accurate, Effective)
- Religious affiliation: Islam
- Established: 2 January 2002; 24 years ago
- School district: Gombak
- Principal: Tuan Haji Badrol Shah Bin Abdul Saha
- Grades: Form 1–Form 5
- Enrollment: 650
- Language: Malay and English
- Colours: Yellow, Red, Blue, Green
- Affiliations: Sekolah Berasrama Penuh, Ministry of Education (Malaysia)
- Website: www.sbpigombak.edu.my

Sekolah Berasrama Penuh Integrasi Gombak (English: Gombak Integrated Fully Residential School, abbreviated INTEGOMB) is one of the 70 boarding schools administered by the Sektor Sekolah Berasrama Penuh (a sector under the Ministry of Education Malaysia). Located in Sungai Pusu, Gombak, the school is a few kilometres from the International Islamic University Malaysia (IIUM). This school is known as InteGomb as an abbreviation from its name among SBPs. Sekolah Berasrama Penuh Integrasi Gombak have shown outstanding achievements both academically and in co-curriculum activities. Sekolah Berasrama Penuh Integrasi Gombak have been ranked top 10 among other elite fully residential schools since 2008 in the Sijil Pelajaran Malaysia. In the Sijil Pelajaran Malaysia 2013 examination, the school gained GPS of 1.18 (20 students obtaining straight A's )to become the best school in Selangor. The school made a history in the SPM 2020 examination to become the best school in Malaysia with GPS of 1.00, SPM 2022 with GPS 1.05 and SPM 2024 with GPS 0.93

== History ==
The concept of Sekolah Berasrama Penuh Integrasi or Integrated Fully Residential School was proposed in 2002 by Tan Sri Musa Mohamad, the then Minister of Education. This type of school provides three academic streams for its students; Islamic science, science and technical. At that time, students who wanted to pursue their studies in the Islam science stream needed to attend religious schools.

Sekolah Berasrama Penuh Integrasi Gombak started its operation in December 2002. The first group of students registered on 17 February 2003. During that time, there were only 14 teaching staff that catered for 162 students in form 4 and form 1. After 4 years of its establishment, in 2007, the school has 601 students and 65 teaching staff, including 30 Thailand students after 3 years later.

Sekolah Berasrama Penuh Integrasi Gombak has been recognised as a high-performance school (Sekolah Berprestasi Tinggi) in the early of the year 2011. As of 2014, Sekolah Berasrama Penuh Integrasi Gombak have been nominated as one of the few schools that was awarded "School of Global Excellence" making it one of the youngest school aside the others.

== Administration ==
The school is led by a head teacher appointed by the Ministry of Education, Malaysia, assisted by three senior assistants (penolong kanan in Malay); senior assistant (Administration), senior assistant (Students' affairs) and senior assistant (Co-curricular activities). The posts are held by:

- Principal : Tuan Haji Badrol Shah Bin Abdul Saha

Past principals include:

- Puan Hajah Aminah Binti Aboo Bakar (2002-2006)
- Puan Hajah Norlia Binti Mohd Shuhaili, A.M.P (2007-2009)
- Puan Hajah Sharifah Asmak Binti Syed Alwee (2009-2010)
- Tuan Haji Jamaluddin Bin Yusoff (2010)
- Puan Wan Saberina Binti Wan Musa (2011-2013)
- Puan Rahanim Binti Abdul Rahim (2014-2016)
- Encik Salleh Bin Ismail (2016-2017)
- Puan Hajah Nor Hayati Binti Yusoff (2017-2021)
- Puan Wan Suryani Binti Wan Mohd Razali (2021-2022)
- Tuan Haji Ahmad Shafrin Bin Abdul Aziz (2022-2023)
- Encik Zulkipli Bin Abdul Latib (2023-2025)
- Tuan Haji Badrol Shah Bin Abdul Saha (2025-)

== Infrastructure ==
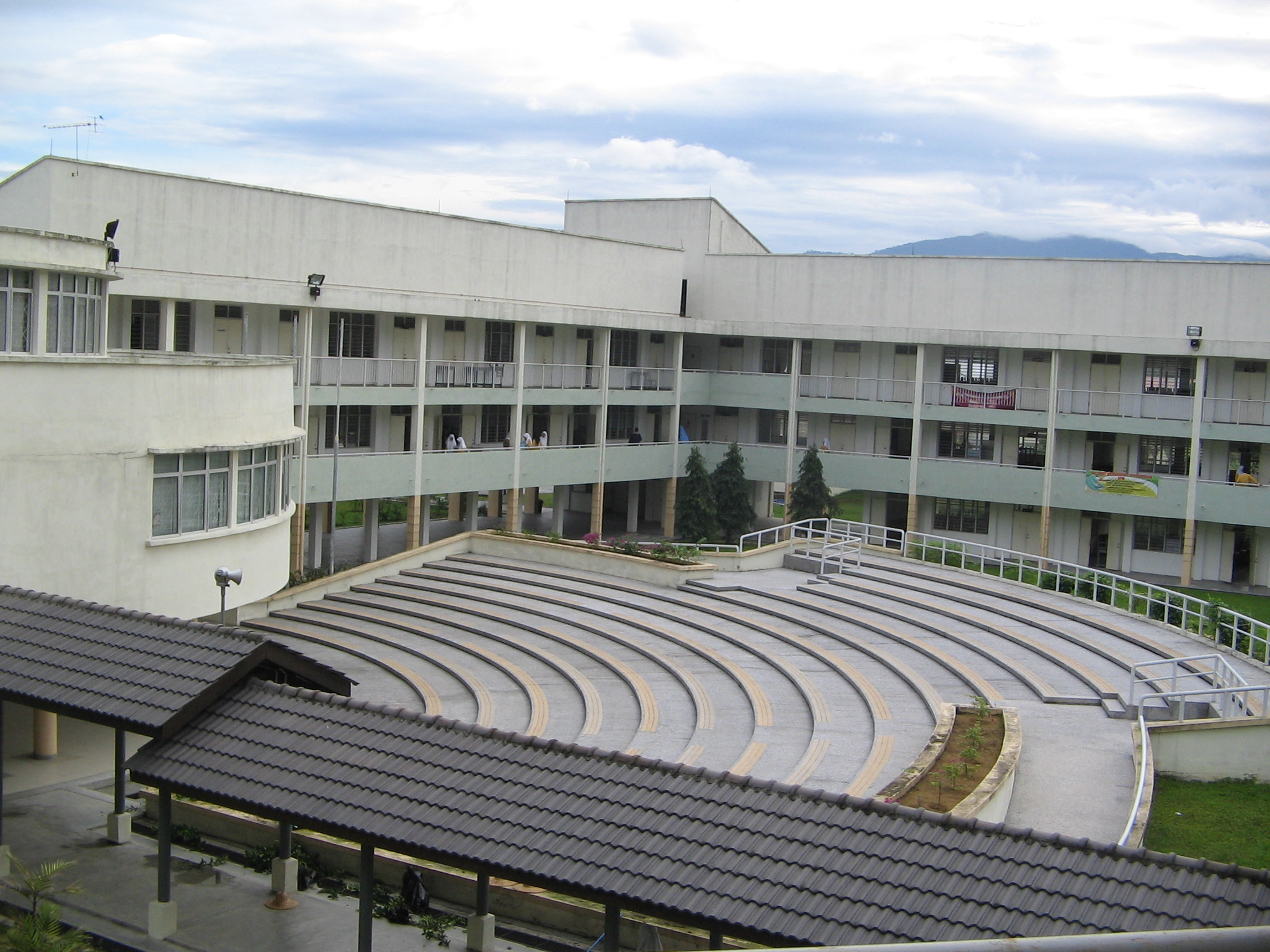
A panoramic view of Kalang Cekal

The school caters for a maximum of 800 students by providing hostels and classrooms.

== Alumni ==
- Azzim Zahid Azmi - Bulan Bintang apparel founder
- Teme Abdullah - Visual Artist

== See also ==
- List of schools in Selangor
