= Sekolah Menengah Kebangsaan Bukit Jelutong =

Bukit Jelutong National Secondary School
- Sekolah Menengah Kebangsaan Bukit Jelutong

Location
- No.2, Jalan Serambi U8/21, Bukit Jelutong; 40150 Shah Alam, Selangor D.E. Malaysia

Information
- Type: National secondary school
- Motto: Proaktif dan Beretika (Proactive and Ethical)
- Established: 6 January 2003; 23 years ago
- Founder: Darwish Muqrish
- School district: Petaling
- School code: BEA8650
- Rector: Khabib (2022)
- Headmaster: En Bahari bin Said
- Grades: Form 1-3 (Lower secondary), Form 4-5 (Upper secondary)
- Enrollment: 1865
- Language: Malay, English, Tamil, Mandarin
- Yearbook: Revolusi
- Website: https://smkbj.edupage.org/

Sekolah Menengah Kebangsaan Bukit Jelutong ("SMKBJ" or "SMK Bukit Jelutong") is a government school located in Shah Alam, Selangor. In 2012, the school had 926 male students and 939 female students, for a total of 1865 students.

== Academics ==
The school offers basic and advanced secondary courses. Students have core classes of math, science, Malay, English, history, and Islamic education (for Muslim students) or moral education (for non-Muslim students). Non-core classes such as geography, physical and Health education, visual arts, music, Chinese, and Tamil are also offered to the students.

Students in the higher secondary, however, are offered elective classes according to their chosen streams. Elective classes include additional mathematics, biology, chemistry, physics, accountancy, IT, and engineering drawing.

SMK Bukit Jelutong is one of 20 Eco-Schools in Malaysia. The school participates in various environmental works.
