= SJK(C) Yuk Chai =

- 育才国民型华文小学校

Location
- Jalan SS 24/1, Taman Megah; 3.116858, 101.607915; Petaling Jaya, Malaysia, Selangor, 47301

Information
- School type: Chinese-type national primary school
- Motto: Kerajinan, Kegigihan, Kejujuran, Kesederhanaan (Diligent, Determine, Integrity, Moderate)
- Established: c. 1939
- Status: Still operating
- School district: Petaling Jaya
- Educational authority: Ministry of Education (Malaysia)
- Headmaster: Robin Tan Tien Chye
- Language: Chinese
- Hours in school day: 6 Hours
- Song: 育才华校校歌

Sekolah Jenis Kebangsaan (Cina) Yuk Chai or more commonly known as SJK (C) Yuk Chai (Chinese: 育才国民型华文小学校）is a Chinese-type national primary school located in Petaling Jaya, Selangor, Malaysia.

== History ==
=== From 1939 to 1945 ===
In 1939, the school was founded in a temple located in Setapak. From 1942 to 1945, SJKC Yuk Chai was closed due to the Japanese invasion of Malaya. After the war, Chen Hua, one of the founders and the then-current chairman, rebuilt Yuk Chai from the ground up.

=== From 1945 to 1970 ===
In 1954, Yuk Chai had to relocate after the area was reclaimed and given to a mining company. This was Yuk Chai's first ever move. During that time, they had about 120 students. After Malaysia gained independence in 1957, SJKC Yuk Chai became officially a government-subsidized school. In 1964, Chen Hua officially retired, giving his position to Lu Zhuorong.

=== From 1970 to 1979 ===
In 1970, Yuk Chai experienced another relocation after the government wanted to improve the appearance of the city. Yuk Chai relocated to now-called Kampung Chempaka. Due to economic problems, Lu Zhuorong led the villagers to use the old building materials from the old school to build six classrooms, the office and the principal's office on the open space at the Kampung Chempaka Community Hall. Male and female toilets were built after gaining funding from the education ministry.

=== From 1979 to 1991 ===
In 1981, with the help from the board of directors, PTAs, alumni and members of Yuk Chai, they successfully relocated to their current location and started a massive reconstruction project, this their third time relocating to the now-called Taman Megah. They built a three-story building with 15 classrooms and a canteen during August. The standard 4-6 students attend the newly built classes while standard 1-3 students stayed at the old school. From 1982 to 1983, the number of students increased dramatically and the school once again launched fundraising campaigns to provide funds for the school. From 1984 to 1988, Yuk Chai built another building, accommodating 18 classrooms, with this from standard one to six are now in one school. Four temporary classrooms were created as the number of students grew, they had about 1500 students by then. In 1989, the school officially completed their newly built hall that cost RM600,000. In 1991, due to the sudden boom in housing around the area, the board of directors launched several donation campaigns, so that a new administration block would be built and more classrooms would be available.

=== From 1991 to 2014 ===
In 1992, the brand new administration block would be open and include a library, administration office, staff room and a resource center. By 1993, the number of students were around 2240, with this number of students some classes even had to teach near the school's field due to the space of the classroom being too small, thus the Ministry of Education donated enough funds to build another building. In 1993, the building opened. In 1997, the school's science block officially opened. On 24 April 1999, the school added digital boards for their classrooms in a project named "Smart School Project". By 2000, after several developments near the area, the number of students had grown to about 3200 students, the space was once again not enough, and thus the Ministry of Education once again donated $1million to build another block including eight classrooms with one science lab and in the same year the building opened. In 2001, the school had fully implemented a computerized system for the staff resource center, administration and library. In 2006, the school extended both Block B and C to include more classrooms and the administration block was once again upgraded. In 2011, the school upgraded the hall to include air-conditioning and built a four-floor activity hall. In 2012, the school built a new basketball court and improved the beauty of the school's garden.

=== From 2014 to Present(2024) ===
In 2015, the school improved Block A's roof. In 2019, the school celebrated its 80th Anniversary by opening a carnival that lasted from September 28 to 29 called "Yuk Chai Fun & Learn Carnival". In 2020, Yuk Chai ran an online talent show called "Yuk Chai's Got Talent Online". In 2023, a fundraising talent show dinner happened from 15 November which included many of the school's activities.

== List of headmasters, PTA, chairman LPS and founders ==
Note*: Most of the PTA, chairman and headmasters and all of the founders are directly translated from their Chinese names into an English name due to the lack of evidence of their English names, so the most accurate representation for a name is their Chinese name. Most English names which are confirmed are people near the 2000s and above and even with that some names might not be known due to the lack of them putting English names even in the 2000s.

Founders
Name	Name in Chinese	Portrait
Chen Hua	程华	
Tan Qi	谭七	
Huang Kun	黄坤	
Li Si	黎泗	
Peng Bin Bin	彭斌彬	
Lu Sheng Yu	陆盛余	

Chairman LPS
Name	Name in Chinese	Portrait	Date
Chen Hua	程华		1939–1964
Lu Zhuorong	陆卓荣		1964–1978
Li Sen	黎森		1978–1979
Dato Tan Leong Min	拿督陈良民		1979–2013
Chong Fat Leong	张发龙		2013–2022
Tan Teck Kwui	陈德贵		2022-Now

PTA
Name	Name in Chinese	Portrait	Date
Chen Yang Xian	陈养贤		1972–1977
Dato Tan Leong Min	拿督陈良民		1978–1979
Hu Guang Xiang	胡广湘		1980–1982
Deng Yang Han	邓扬汉		1983–1988
Chen Guo Qing	陈国庆		1989–1990
Liao Bao Rui	廖宝瑞		1991–1992
Lin Jin Sheng	林锦胜		1993
Song Wu Guang	宋武光		1994
Fu Dun Lian	傅敦联		1995
Tan Teck Kwui	陈德贵		1996
Chong Fat Leong	张发龙		1997–2000
Tan Teck Kwui	陈德贵		2001–2004
Lin Bai Chong	林柏宠		2005–2007
Fu Dun Shu	符敦书		2008
Lim Jenn Shiah	林征声		2009–2011
Thean Kon Fah	邓观发		2012–2016
Sze Toh Wu Pin	司徒武坪		2017–2021
Peng Jian Long	彭健龙		2021–2022
Choi Kian You	蔡間有		2022-

Headmasters
Name	Name in Chinese	Portrait	Date
Yan Jing Pei	严镜培		1939–1940
Zhong Hai Yuan	钟海元		1940–1941
Fu Wen Ming	傅文明		1945–1956
Liu Yun	刘云		1957–1964
Chen Yu Xia	陈玉霞		1964–1968
Chen Xiu Yun	陈秀云		1968–1971
Zeng Hua Long	曾华隆		1971–1977
Lu Yin Ji	陆胤基		1977–1985
Qiu San He	丘三和		1986–1991
Zhu Su Yan	朱素燕		1991 (Note: This principle was temporary thus explaining his one year term.)
Su Bai Li	苏白里		1991–1996
Lin Jie Ying	林洁英		1996
Goh Cheng Leong	吴清良		1997–2014
Chew Hock Jin	周福仁		2014–2021
Soh Swee Koon	苏绥焜		2021-2024
Robin Tan Tien Chye	陈天才		2024-Now

== Facilities ==
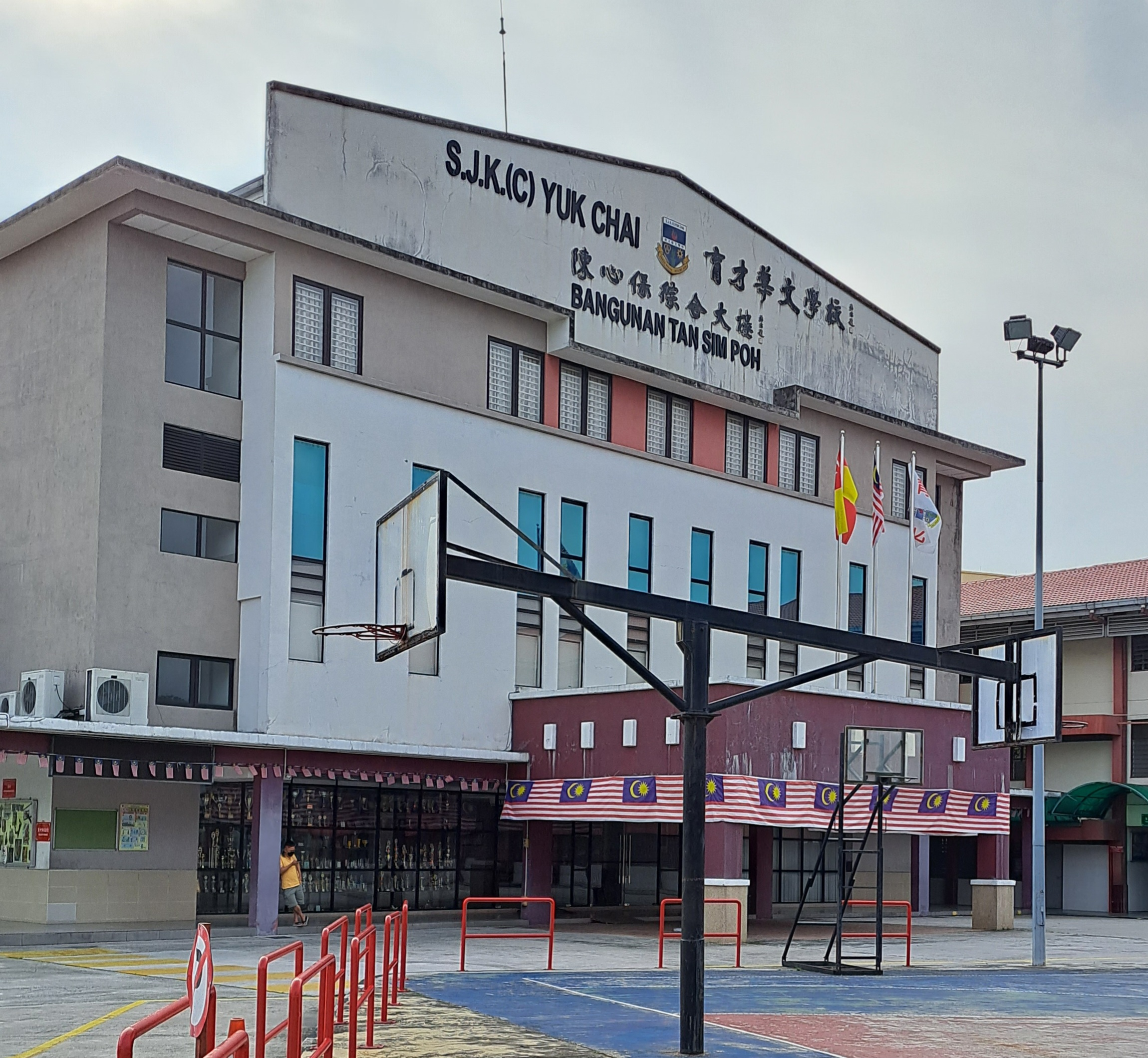
This is the outside of the school SJKC Yuk Chai Hall

== Gallery ==
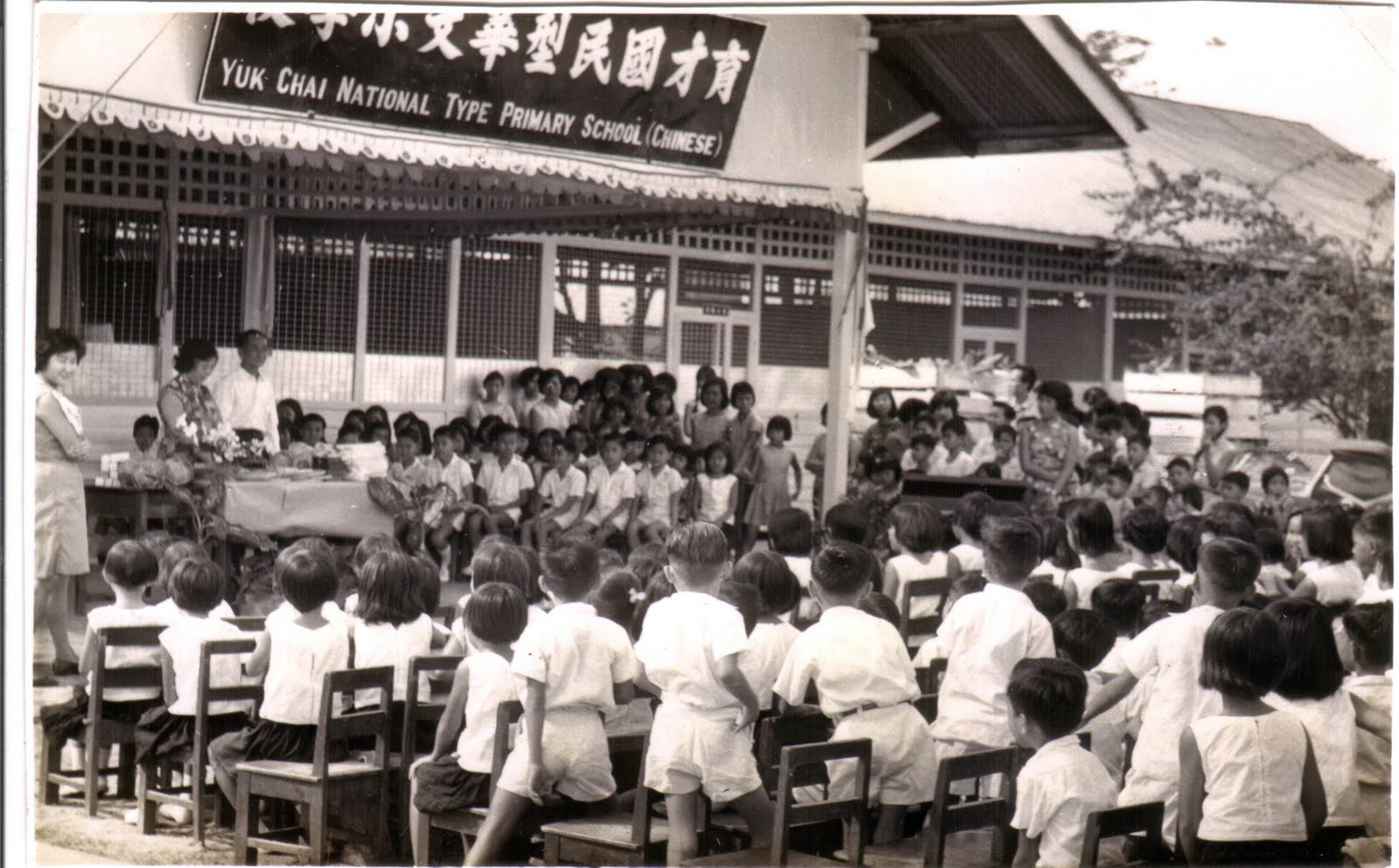
A school assembly in the 1940s

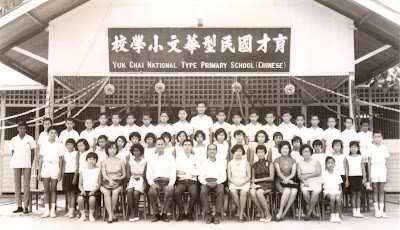
The 1960 Graduation Photo of Yuk Chai, Selangor

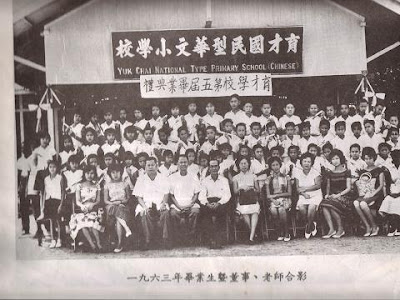
The 1963 Graduation Photo of Yuk Chai, Selangor. 5th Graduation Ceremony.

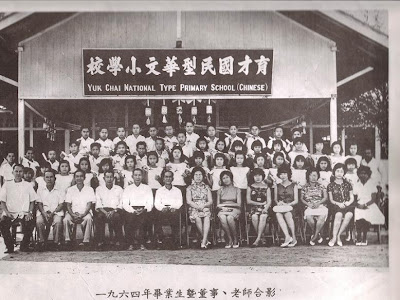
The 1964 Graduation Photo of Yuk Chai, Selangor

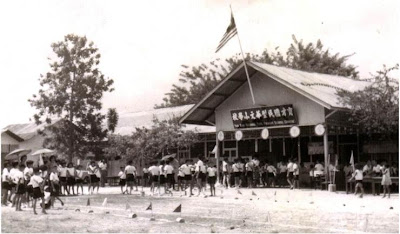
Yuk Chai's Sports Day in the 1970s

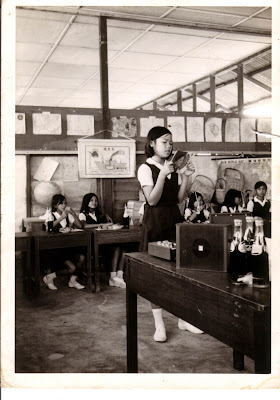
A student using the radio

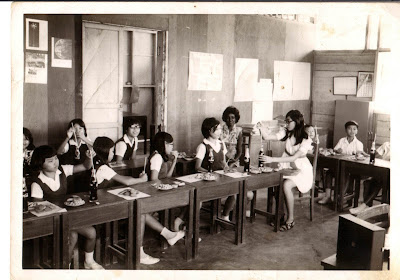
Students getting excited to drink Coke

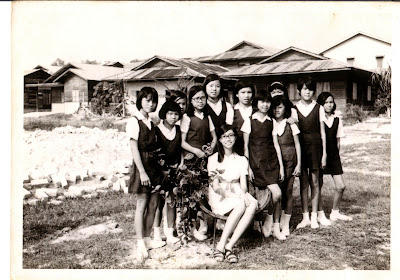
A teacher and her students outside of the school's garden

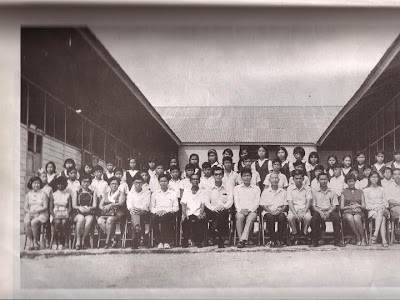
The 1972 Graduation Photo of Yuk Chai, Selangor
