= The International School at ParkCity =

The International School @ ParkCity
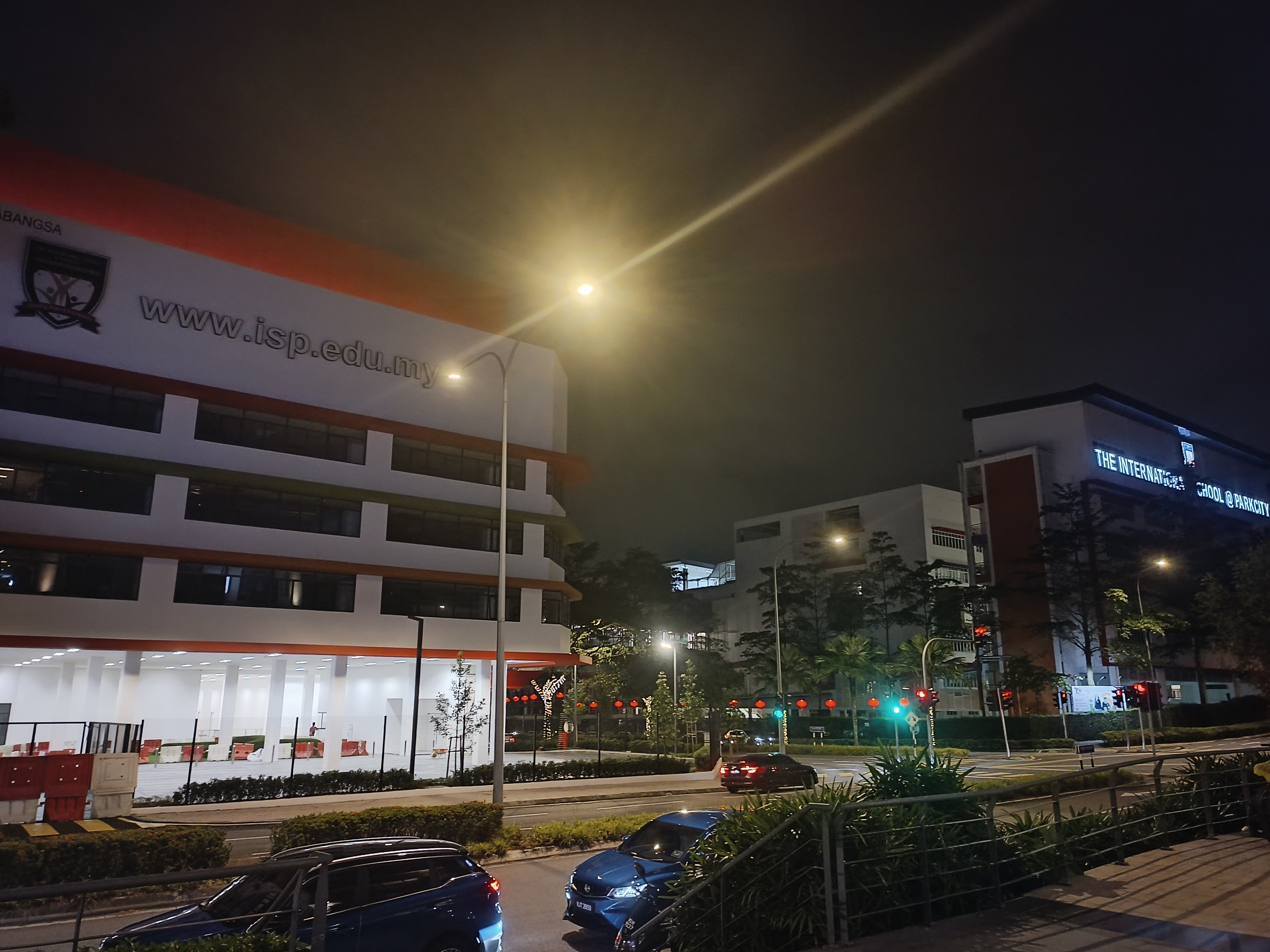

Location
- Kuala Lumpur; Malaysia; 3.1880°N 101.6376°E

Information
- Type: International school
- Motto: Learning Beyond Boundaries
- Established: 2011
- Director of Education: Andrew Dalton
- Principal: Tom Keenan
- Houses: Penyu; Harimau; Badak; Gajah
- Website: www.isp.edu.my

The International School @ ParkCity (ISP) is an international school catering for students age 3–18, located in the award-winning residential area of Desa ParkCity in Kuala Lumpur, Malaysia. The school was established by a partnership between Brighton Education Group Sdn Bhd, who provide educational services in ASEAN, and Perdana ParkCity Sdn Bhd who operates this and other townships. It opened in September 2011.

== Accreditations and awards ==
For external examinations the school is accredited by Cambridge Assessment International Education and Assessment and Qualifications Alliance (AQA).

It is a member of the Association of International Malaysian Schools (AIMS), and the Federation of British International Schools in Asia (FOBISIA).

In 2016, 2018, 2020 and 2024, it was selected by Apple as an Apple Distinguished School, an award that recognises the school as "an exemplary learning environment for innovation, leadership, and educational excellence".

Following an accreditation inspection in 2017, and again in 2020, by the International School Quality Mark (ISQM), ISP was awarded Gold Accreditation, gaining an ‘Outstanding’ grade of every category.

ISP is an Award Centre for the Duke of Edinburgh's International Award (DOE-IA).

ISPKL is the sister school of ISPH - the International School of Parkcity HaNoi in VietNam.
