= Rugby World Cup all-time table =

This all-time table compares national teams that have participated in the Rugby World Cup by a number of criteria including matches, wins, losses, draws, total points for, total points against, etc. 26 nations have participated in the tournament thus far.

The table also shows – among other things – the accumulated points for every team that has ever participated in the tournament. This takes each game as if it were a World Cup pool stage match, with each team awarded four points for a win, two points for a draw and none for a defeat. A team scoring four tries in one match scored a bonus point, as did a team that lost by fewer than eight points.

== All-time table ==
This is a list of matches played by all countries at the Rugby World Cup since the inaugural 1987 edition.

Last updated: 28 October 2023

| Country | Apps | Pld | W | D | L | PF | PA | PD | % | Pts | Avg pts | Best finish |
|---|---|---|---|---|---|---|---|---|---|---|---|---|
| South Africa | 8 | 50 | 42 | 0 | 8 | 1,720 | 641 | +1,079 | 84.00 | 186 | 3.72 | Champions (1995, 2007, 2019, 2023) |
| New Zealand | 10 | 64 | 54 | 1 | 9 | 2,888 | 842 | +2,046 | 84.38 | 238 | 3.72 | Champions (1987, 2011, 2015) |
| Australia | 10 | 57 | 44 | 0 | 13 | 1,887 | 845 | +1,042 | 77.19 | 156 | 2.74 | Champions (1991, 1999) |
| England | 10 | 58 | 42 | 1 | 15 | 1,790 | 885 | +905 | 72.41 | 153 | 2.64 | Champions (2003) |
| France | 10 | 58 | 40 | 2 | 16 | 1,823 | 1,027 | +796 | 68.97 | 147 | 2.53 | Runners-up (1987, 1999, 2011) |
| Argentina | 10 | 48 | 25 | 0 | 23 | 1,283 | 995 | +288 | 52.08 | 104 | 2.17 | Third place (2007) |
| Wales | 10 | 49 | 30 | 0 | 19 | 1,398 | 953 | +445 | 61.22 | 105 | 2.14 | Third place (1987) |
| Scotland | 10 | 46 | 26 | 1 | 19 | 1,407 | 874 | +533 | 56.52 | 99 | 2.15 | Fourth place (1991) |
| Ireland | 10 | 45 | 28 | 0 | 17 | 1,322 | 809 | +513 | 62.22 | 104 | 2.31 | Quarter-finals (eight times) |
| Fiji | 9 | 37 | 13 | 0 | 24 | 844 | 1,084 | −240 | 35.14 | 57 | 1.54 | Quarter-finals (1987, 2007, 2023) |
| Samoa | 9 | 36 | 15 | 0 | 21 | 804 | 935 | −131 | 41.67 | 55 | 1.53 | Quarter-finals (1991, 1995) |
| Japan | 10 | 37 | 10 | 2 | 25 | 753 | 1,454 | −701 | 27.03 | 42 | 1.14 | Quarter-finals (2019) |
| Canada | 9 | 33 | 7 | 3 | 23 | 541 | 1,015 | −474 | 21.21 | 26 | 0.79 | Quarter-finals (1991) |
| Italy | 10 | 36 | 15 | 1 | 20 | 741 | 1,158 | −417 | 41.67 | 63 | 1.75 | Pool stage - 2 wins (six times) |
| Tonga | 9 | 33 | 9 | 0 | 24 | 568 | 1,143 | −575 | 27.27 | 33 | 1.00 | Pool stage - 2 wins (2007, 2011) |
| Georgia | 6 | 24 | 5 | 1 | 18 | 326 | 759 | −433 | 20.83 | 24 | 1.00 | Pool stage - 2 wins (2015) |
| Portugal | 2 | 8 | 1 | 1 | 6 | 102 | 312 | −210 | 12.50 | 7 | 0.88 | Pool stage - 1 win and 1 draw (2023) |
| Romania | 9 | 32 | 6 | 0 | 26 | 397 | 1,355 | −958 | 18.75 | 25 | 0.78 | Pool stage - 1 win (six times) |
| Uruguay | 5 | 19 | 4 | 0 | 15 | 253 | 882 | −629 | 21.05 | 17 | 0.89 | Pool stage - 1 win (1999, 2003, 2019, 2023) |
| United States | 8 | 29 | 3 | 0 | 26 | 402 | 1,048 | −646 | 10.34 | 15 | 0.52 | Pool stage - 1 win (1987, 2003, 2011) |
| Namibia | 7 | 27 | 0 | 1 | 26 | 285 | 1,578 | −1,293 | 0.00 | 3 | 0.11 | Pool stage - 1 draw (2019) |
| Russia | 2 | 8 | 0 | 0 | 8 | 76 | 356 | −280 | 0.00 | 1 | 0.13 | Pool stage - all losses (2011, 2019) |
| Zimbabwe | 2 | 6 | 0 | 0 | 6 | 84 | 309 | −225 | 0.00 | 0 | 0.00 | Pool stage - all losses (1987, 1991) |
| Spain | 1 | 3 | 0 | 0 | 3 | 18 | 122 | −104 | 0.00 | 0 | 0.00 | Pool stage - all losses (1999) |
| Ivory Coast | 1 | 3 | 0 | 0 | 3 | 29 | 172 | −143 | 0.00 | 0 | 0.00 | Pool stage - all losses (1995) |
| Chile | 1 | 4 | 0 | 0 | 4 | 27 | 215 | −188 | 0.00 | 0 | 0.00 | Pool stage - all losses (2023) |

Legend:

| Pld | Total number of World Cup matches played |
| W | Wins |
| D | Draws |
| L | Losses |
| PF | Points for (points scored) |
| PA | Points against (points conceded) |
| PD | Points difference (PF-PA) |
| % | Win ratio |
| Pts | Log points achieved (W=4, D=2, L=0) |
| Avg pts | Average points per match |
| Best finish | Best overall finish |

^1 Typhoon Hagibis caused the matches New Zealand versus Italy and England versus France to be cancelled and recorded as 0–0 draws.

^2 Typhoon Hagibis and an associated evacuation order for Kamaishi caused the match between Namibia and Canada to be cancelled and recorded as a 0–0 draw.

== See also ==
- Records and statistics of the Rugby World Cup
- National team appearances in the Rugby World Cup
