= SMK Kepong =

Location
- Jalan FRIM, 52100 Kuala Lumpur; Malaysia

Information
- Type: Public coeducational secondary
- Motto: Menuju kejayaan
- Established: 1965
- School district: Gombak
- Principal: Pn.Nor Anida binti Mamat
- Grades: Form 1 - Form 6 (Secondary 1 - Secondary 6)
- Yearbook: Panduan sekolah
- Website: www.smkkepong.edu.my

Sekolah Menengah Kebangsaan Kepong (English: Kepong National Secondary School), is a public secondary school located in Kuala Lumpur, Malaysia. It was established in 1965.
